= Japan national baseball team fixtures and results =

The following is a list of professional baseball match results currently active in the latest version of the WBSC World Rankings, as well as any future matches that have been scheduled.

Legend

Win Draw Lose Void or postponed Fixture

== 2019 ==
Friendly	March 9	Japan	2–4	Mexico	Kyocera Dome, Japan
Friendly	19:12 JT	LP: Takahiro Matsunaga	Boxscore	WP: Fabián Cota; Sv: Jake Sanchez	Attendance: 28,933

Friendly	March 10	Mexico	0–6	Japan	Kyocera Dome, Japan
Friendly	19:09 JT	LP: Manny Barreda	Boxscore	WP: Juri Hara; HR: Masataka Yoshida (1)	Attendance: 28,622

Friendly	October 31	Canada	6–5	Japan	Cellular Stadium, Japan
Friendly	19:08 JT	WP: Phillippe Aumont; Sv: Scott Mathieson	Boxscore	LP: Shun Yamaguchi	Attendance: 14,858

Friendly	November 1	Japan	3–0	Canada	Cellular Stadium, Japan
Friendly	19:09 JT	WP: Shota Imanaga; Sv: Yasuaki Yamasaki	Boxscore	LP: Daniel Procopio	Attendance: 15,253

WBSC Premier 12 GS	November 5	Venezuela	4–8	Japan	Taoyuan Baseball Stadium, Taiwan
WBSC Premier 12 GS	18:00 NST	LP: Anthony Vizcaya	Boxscore	WP: Hiroshi Kaino	Attendance: 3,868

WBSC Premier 12 GS	November 6	Puerto Rico	0–4	Japan	Taoyuan Baseball Stadium, Taiwan
WBSC Premier 12 GS	18:00 NST	LP: Giovanni Soto	Boxscore	WP: Rei Takahashi; HR: Seiya Suzuki (1)	Attendance: 4,209

WBSC Premier 12 GS	November 7	Japan	8–1	Chinese Taipei	Taichung Intercontinental Baseball Stadium, Taiwan
WBSC Premier 12 GS	18:30 NST	WP: Yūdai Ōno; HR: Seiya Suzuki (1)	Boxscore	LP: Liao Yi-Chung	Attendance: 20,465

WBSC Premier 12 SR	November 11	Australia	2–3	Japan	ZOZO Marine Stadium, Japan
WBSC Premier 12 SR	19:00 JT	LP: Jon Kennedy	Boxscore	WP: Hiroshi Kaino; Sv: Yasuaki Yamasaki	Attendance: 17,819

WBSC Premier 12 SR	November 12	United States	4–3	Japan	Tokyo Dome, Japan
WBSC Premier 12 SR	19:00 JT	WP: Clayton Richard; Sv: Brandon Dickson; HR: Jordan Adell (1)	Boxscore	LP: Rei Takahashi	Attendance: 27,827

WBSC Premier 12 SR	November 13	Mexico	1–3	Japan	Tokyo Dome, Japan
WBSC Premier 12 SR	19:00 JT	LP: Horacio Ramírez; HR: Jonathan Jones (1)	Boxscore	WP: Shota Imanaga; Sv: Yasuaki Yamasaki	Attendance: 31,776

WBSC Premier 12 SR	November 16	South Korea	8–10	Japan	Tokyo Dome, Japan
WBSC Premier 12 SR	19:00 JT	LP: Lee Seung-ho; HR: Jaegyun Hwang (1)	Boxscore	WP: Yūdai Ōno; Sv: Kazuto Taguchi	Attendance: 44,224

WBSC Premier 12 F	November 17	South Korea	3–5	Japan	Tokyo Dome, Japan
WBSC Premier 12 F	19:00 JT	LP: Yang Hyeon-jong; HR: Ha-seong Kim (1), Hyun-soo Kim (1)	Boxscore	WP: Rei Takahashi; Sv: Yasuaki Yamasaki; HR: Tetsuto Yamada (1)	Attendance: 44,960

== 2021 ==
2020 Summer Olympics GS	July 28	Dominican Republic	3–4	Japan	Azuma Baseball Stadium, Japan
2020 Summer Olympics GS	12:00 JT	LP: Jairo Asencio	Boxscore	WP: Ryoji Kuribayashi

2020 Summer Olympics GS	July 31	Japan	7–4	Mexico	Yokohama Stadium, Japan
2020 Summer Olympics GS	12:00 JT	WP: Masato Morishita; Sv: Ryoji Kuribayashi; HR: Tetsuto Yamada (1), Hayato Sakamoto (1)	Boxscore	LP: Juan Pablo Oramas; HR: Joey Meneses (1)

2020 Summer Olympics R2	August 2	United States	6–7 (F/10)	Japan	Yokohama Stadium, Japan
2020 Summer Olympics R2	19:00 JT	LP: Edwin Jackson; HR: Triston Casas (2)	Boxscore	WP: Ryoji Kuribayashi; HR: Seiya Suzuki (1)

2020 Summer Olympics SF	August 4	South Korea	2–5	Japan	Yokohama Stadium, Japan
2020 Summer Olympics SF	19:00 JT	LP: Go Woo-suk	Boxscore	WP: Hiromi Itoh; Sv: Ryoji Kuribayashi

2020 Summer Olympics F	August 7	United States	0–2	Japan	Yokohama Stadium, Japan
2020 Summer Olympics F	19:00 JT	LP: Nick Martinez	Boxscore	WP: Masato Morishita; Sv: Ryoji Kuribayashi; HR: Munetaka Murakami (1)

== 2022 ==
Friendly	November 9	Australia	1–8	Japan	Sapporo Dome, Japan
Friendly	19:00 JT	LP: Warwick Saupold	Boxscore	WP: Shota Imanaga; HR: Munetaka Murakami (1)

Friendly	November 10	Japan	9–0	Australia	Sapporo Dome, Japan
Friendly	18:30 JT	WP: Roki Sasaki	Boxscore	LP: Tim Atherton

== 2023 ==
World Baseball Classic GS	March 9	China	1–8	Japan	Tokyo Dome, Japan
World Baseball Classic GS	19:00 JT	LP: Wang Xiang (0–1); HR: Pei Liang (1)	Boxscore	WP: Shohei Ohtani (1–0); HR: Shugo Maki (1)	Attendance: 41,616; Umpires: HP – Stu Scheurwater, 1B – Cuti Suarez, 2B – Ben May, 3B – Delfin Colon

World Baseball Classic GS	March 10	South Korea	4–13	Japan	Tokyo Dome, Japan
World Baseball Classic GS	19:00 JT	LP: Kwang-hyun Kim (0–1); HR: Yang Eui-ji (2), Park Kun-woo (1)	Boxscore	WP: Yu Darvish (1–0); HR: Kensuke Kondo (1)	Attendance: 41,629; Umpires: HP: Laz Díaz, 1B: Stu Scheurwater, 2B: Delfin Colon, 3B: Cuti Suárez

World Baseball Classic GS	March 11	Czech Republic	2–10	Japan	Tokyo Dome, Japan
World Baseball Classic GS	19:00 JT	LP: Ondřej Satoria (0–1)	Boxscore	WP: Rōki Sasaki (1–0); Sv: Hiroya Miyagi (1); HR: Shugo Maki (2)	Attendance: 41,637; Umpires: HP: Ben May, 1B: Ramon De Jesus, 2B: Cuti Suárez, 3B: Fabrizio Fabrizzi

World Baseball Classic GS	March 12	Japan	7–1	Australia	Tokyo Dome, Japan
World Baseball Classic GS	19:00 JT	WP: Yoshinobu Yamamoto (1–0); HR: Shohei Ohtani (1)	Boxscore	LP: Will Sherriff (0–1); HR: Alex Hall (1)	Attendance: 41,664; Umpires: HP – Pat Hoberg, 1B – Cuti Suárez, 2B – Adam Hamari, 3B – Chan-Jung Chang

World Baseball Classic QF	March 16	Italy	3–9	Japan	Tokyo Dome, Japan
World Baseball Classic QF	19:00 JT	LP: Joe LaSorsa (0–1); HR: Dominic Fletcher (1)	Boxscore	WP: Shohei Ohtani (2–0); HR: Kazuma Okamoto (1), Masataka Yoshida (1)	Attendance: 41,723; Umpires: HP – Pat Hoberg, 1B – Laz Díaz, 2B – Delfin Colon, 3B – Cuti Suárez

World Baseball Classic SF	March 20	Mexico	5–6	Japan	LoanDepot Park, United States
World Baseball Classic SF	19:00 ET	LP: Giovanny Gallegos; HR: Luis Urías (1)	Boxscore	WP: Taisei Ota; HR: Masataka Yoshida (2)	Attendance: 35,933; Umpires: HP – Quinn Wolcott, 1B – Ramiro Alfaro, 2B – Jong-Chui Park, 3B – Lance Barksdale, LF – Edward Pinales, RF: John Tumpane

World Baseball Classic F	March 21	United States	2–3	Japan	LoanDepot Park, United States
World Baseball Classic F	19:00 ET	LP: Merrill Kelly (0–1); HR: Trea Turner (5), Kyle Schwarber (2)	Boxscore	WP: Shōta Imanaga (1–0); Sv: Shohei Ohtani (1); HR: Munetaka Murakami (1), Kazuma Okamoto (2)	Attendance: 36,098; Umpires: HP – Lance Barksdale, 1B – John Tumpane, 2B – Edward Pinales, 3B – Ramiro Alfaro, LF – Jong-Chui Park, RF – Quinn Wolcott

== 2024 ==
Friendly	March 6	Europe	0–5	Japan	Kyocera Dome, Japan
Friendly	19:00 JST	LP: Tom de Blok	Boxscore	WP: Kaima Taira	Attendance: 27,698

Friendly	March 7	Japan	2–0	Europe	Kyocera Dome, Japan
Friendly	19:00 JST	WP: Yumeto Kanemaru; Sv: Atsuki Taneichi	Boxscore	LP: Markus Solbach	Attendance: 25,379

Friendly	November 9	Czech Republic	1–7	Japan	Vantelin Dome, Japan
Friendly	19:06 JST	LP: Jan Tomek	Boxscore	WP: Hiroto Saiki; HR: Ryosuke Tatsumi (1)	Attendance: 33,758

Friendly	November 10	Japan	9–0	Czech Republic	Vantelin Dome, Japan
Friendly	19:08 JST	WP: Takahisa Hayakawa; HR: Shota Morishita (1)	Boxscore	LP: Ondřej Satoria	Attendance: 23,223

WBSC Premier 12 GS	November 13	Australia	3–9	Japan	Vantelin Dome, Japan
WBSC Premier 12 GS	19:00 JST	LP: Lewis Thorpe; HR: Ulrich Bojarski (1), Rixon Wingrove (1)	Boxscore	WP: Haruto Inoue	Attendance: 30,691

WBSC Premier 12 GS	November 15	South Korea	3–6	Japan	Taipei Dome, Taiwan
WBSC Premier 12 GS	18:00 NST	LP: Kwak Do-gyu; HR: Park Dong-won (1)	Boxscore	WP: Chihiro Sumida; Sv: Taisei Ota; HR: Shota Morishita (1)	Attendance: 20,028

WBSC Premier 12 GS	November 16	Japan	3–1	Chinese Taipei	Taipei Dome, Taiwan
WBSC Premier 12 GS	18:00 NST	WP: Hiroto Saiki; Sv: Taisei Ota; HR: Sosuke Genda (1)	Boxscore	LP: Chen Po-ching; HR: Dai Pei-fong (1)	Attendance: 34,882

WBSC Premier 12 GS	November 17	Cuba	6–7	Japan	Tianmu Baseball Stadium, Taiwan
WBSC Premier 12 GS	18:00 NST	LP: Liván Moinelo	Boxscore	WP: Tatsuya Shimizu; Sv: Shōma Fujihira	Attendance: 4,955

WBSC Premier 12 GS	November 18	Japan	11–3	Dominican Republic	Tianmu Baseball Stadium, Taiwan
WBSC Premier 12 GS	18:00 NST	WP: Haruto Inoue	Boxscore	LP: Héctor Pérez	Attendance: 2,572

WBSC Premier 12 SR	November 21	United States	1–9	Japan	Tokyo Dome, Japan
WBSC Premier 12 SR	19:00 JST	LP: Darrell Thompson; HR: Colby Thomas (1)	Boxscore	WP: Chihiro Sumida; HR: Kaito Kozono (2)	Attendance: 26,297

WBSC Premier 12 SR	November 22	Venezuela	6–9	Japan	Tokyo Dome, Japan
WBSC Premier 12 SR	19:00 JST	LP: José Álvarez; HR: Carlos Pérez (1), Ángel Reyes (1)	Boxscore	WP: Haruto Inoue; HR: Shugo Maki (1), Shōgo Sakakura (1)	Attendance: 33,300

WBSC Premier 12 SR	November 23	Chinese Taipei	6–9	Japan	Tokyo Dome, Japan
WBSC Premier 12 SR	19:00 JST	LP: Chen Po-ching; HR: Lin An-ko (1)	Boxscore	WP: Koki Kitayama; HR: Itsuki Murabayashi (1)	Attendance: 41,674

WBSC Premier 12 F	November 24	Chinese Taipei	4–0	Japan	Tokyo Dome, Japan
WBSC Premier 12 F	19:00 JST	WP: Yi Chang; HR: Chieh-hsien Chen (1), Chia-cheng Lin (1)	Boxscore	LP: Shosei Togo	Attendance: 41,827; Umpires: Angel Campos

== 2025 ==
Friendly	March 5	Netherlands	0–5	Japan	Kyocera Dome, Japan
Friendly	19:07 JT	LP: Kevin Kelly	Boxscore	WP: Hiroya Miyagi; HR: Shun Mizutani (1)	Attendance: 28,618

Friendly	March 6	Japan	9–0	Netherlands	Kyocera Dome, Japan
Friendly	18:35 JT	WP: Ryosuke Ohtsu; HR: Yusuke Oyama (1)	Boxscore	LP: Koen Postelmans	Attendance: 21,747

Friendly	November 15	South Korea	4–11	Japan	Tokyo Dome, Japan
Friendly	18:36 JT	LP: Kim Taek-yeon; HR: Ahn Hyun-min (1), Song Sung-mun (1)	Boxscore	WP: Yuki Matsumoto; HR: Yukinori Kishida (1)	Attendance: 41,631

Friendly	November 16	Japan	7–7	South Korea	Tokyo Dome, Japan
Friendly	19:08 JT		Boxscore	HR: Ahn Hyun-min (2), Kim Ju-won (1)	Attendance: 41,627

== 2026 ==
World Baseball Classic GS	March 6	Japan	13–0 (F/7)	Chinese Taipei	Tokyo Dome, Japan
World Baseball Classic GS	19:09 JT	WP: Yoshinobu Yamamoto (1−0); HR: Shohei Ohtani (1)	Boxscore	LP: Hao-Chun Cheng (0−1)	Attendance: 42,314; Umpires: HP – Jordan Baker, 1B – David Rackley, 2B – Omar Peralta, 3B – Edwin Louisa

World Baseball Classic GS	March 7	South Korea	6–8	Japan	Tokyo Dome, Japan
World Baseball Classic GS	19:08 JT	LP: Park Yeong-hyun (0−1); HR: Hyeseong Kim (1)	Boxscore	WP: Atsuki Taneichi (1−0); Sv: Taisei Ota (1); HR: Seiya Suzuki (2), Shohei Ohtani (2), Masataka Yoshida (1)	Attendance: 42,318; Umpires: HP – Todd Tichenor, 1B – Jordan Baker, 2B – Edward Pinales, 3B – Edwin Louisa

World Baseball Classic GS	March 8	Australia	3–4	Japan	Tokyo Dome, Japan
World Baseball Classic GS	19:09 JT	LP: Jon Kennedy (0−1); HR: Alex Hall (2), Rixon Wingrove (1)	Boxscore	WP: Chihiro Sumida (1−0); Sv: Taisei Ota (2); HR: Masataka Yoshida (2)	Attendance: 42,331; Umpires: HP – Chad Fairchild, 1B – Edwin Louisa, 2B – Ryan Additon, 3B – Edward Pinales

World Baseball Classic GS	March 10	Czech Republic	0–9	Japan	Tokyo Dome, Japan
World Baseball Classic GS	19:09 JT	LP: Michal Kovala (0−1)	Boxscore	WP: Yumeto Kanemaru (1−0); HR: Ukyo Shuto (1), Munetaka Murakami (1)	Attendance: 42,340; Umpires: HP – Ryan Additon, 1B – Jordan Baker, 2B – Omar Peralta, 3B – Ruben Ramos

World Baseball Classic QF	March 14	Venezuela	8–5	Japan	LoanDepot Park, United States
World Baseball Classic QF	21:09 ET	WP: Enmanuel De Jesus; Sv: Daniel Palencia; HR: Ronald Acuña Jr. (2), Maikel García (1), Wilyer Abreu (1)	Boxscore	LP: Hiromi Itoh; HR: Shohei Ohtani (3), Shōta Morishita (1)	Attendance: 34,548; Umpires: HP – Chris Segal, 1B – Dan Iassogna, 2B – Maikol Tibibijo, 3B – Tim Meyer
