= Hiroto Takahashi =

Japanese baseball player (born 2002)

Hiroto Takahashi 髙橋 宏斗
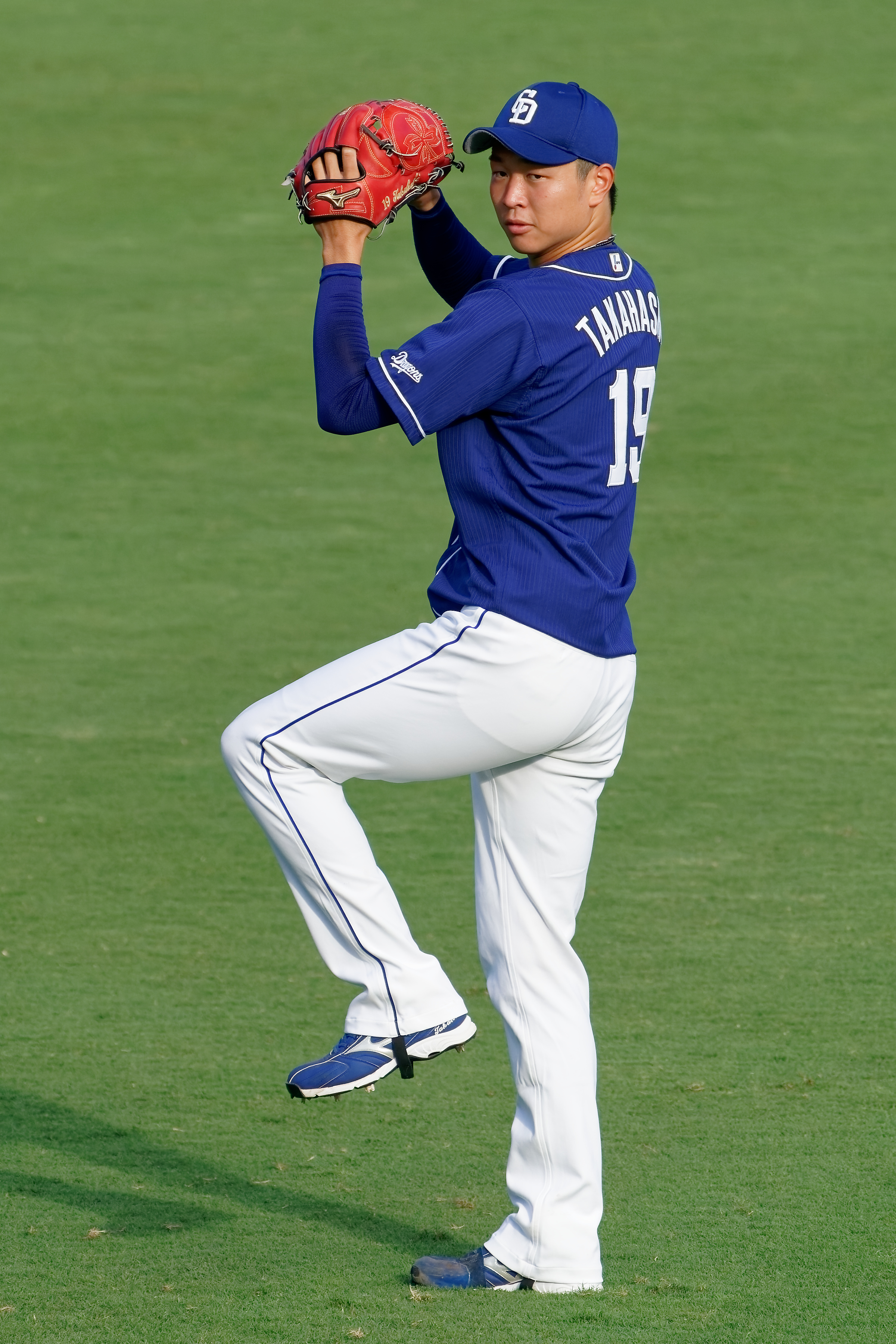

Chunichi Dragons – No. 19
- Pitcher
- Born: August 9, 2002 (age 24); Owariasahi, Aichi, Japan
- Bats: Right Throws: Right

NPB debut
- March 30, 2022, for the Chunichi Dragons

NPB statistics (through 2026)
- Win–loss record: 38–39
- Earned run average: 2.37
- Strikeouts: 682
- Stats at Baseball Reference

Teams
- Chunichi Dragons (2022–present)

Career highlights and awards
- Central League ERA leader (2024); NPB All-Star (2024)
Medals
Men's baseball
Representing Japan
World Baseball Classic
Gold medal – first place	2023 Miami	Team
WBSC Premier12
Silver medal – second place	2024	Team

Hiroto Takahashi (髙橋 宏斗, Takahashi Hiroto; born August 9, 2002) is a Japanese professional baseball pitcher for the Chunichi Dragons of Nippon Professional Baseball (NPB).

== Career ==
=== Chunichi Dragons ===
On 26 October 2020, Takahashi was selected by the Chunichi Dragons with their 1st pick at the 2020 NPB Draft.

On 1 November, Takahashi signed a pre-contract with the Dragons guaranteeing a ¥100,000,000 sign-on bonus and a ¥16,000,000 yearly salary with ¥50,000,000 in incentives.

On March 30, 2022, Takahashi made his professional debut against the Yokohama DeNA BayStars as the starting pitcher. He pitched 5 innings and allowed 5 hits, 4 walks, and 4 earned runs, and was charged with a loss. On April 7, Takahashi earned his first win against the Tokyo Yakult Swallows, allowing 3 runs across 6 innings pitched. On July 7, Takahashi struck out Taishi Ohta on a fastball that set a club record for the fastest pitch thrown by a Japanese pitcher, clocking in at 98.2 miles per hour (158 kilometers per hour) in a 0–0 tie against the BayStars. On July 29, Takahashi was 5 outs away from a no-hitter against the Hiroshima Toyo Carp, but gave up a single to Kaito Kozono in the 8th inning.

== International career ==
On January 26, 2023, Takahashi was selected to play in the 2023 World Baseball Classic for Samurai Japan. On March 10, he closed out the game in the 9th inning against South Korea, retiring all three batters faced. However, on March 13, Takahashi gave up a home run to Alex Hall in the 9th inning against Australia. Japan won the game 7–1 nonetheless. In the final on March 22 against the United States, Takahashi pitched in the 5th inning, retiring Mike Trout, Paul Goldschmidt, and Kyle Schwarber after giving up a leadoff single to Mookie Betts.

On October 9, 2024, Takahashi was selected to play in the 2024 WBSC Premier12. On November 15, Takahashi gave up 7 hits and 2 runs across 4 innings pitched. On November 21, Takahashi struck out 8 batters across 4 innings against the United States, which lead to praise from Team USA manager Mike Scioscia.

On January 26, 2026, Takahashi was selected to play in the 2026 World Baseball Classic.
