= Masataka Yoshida =

Japanese baseball player (born 1993)

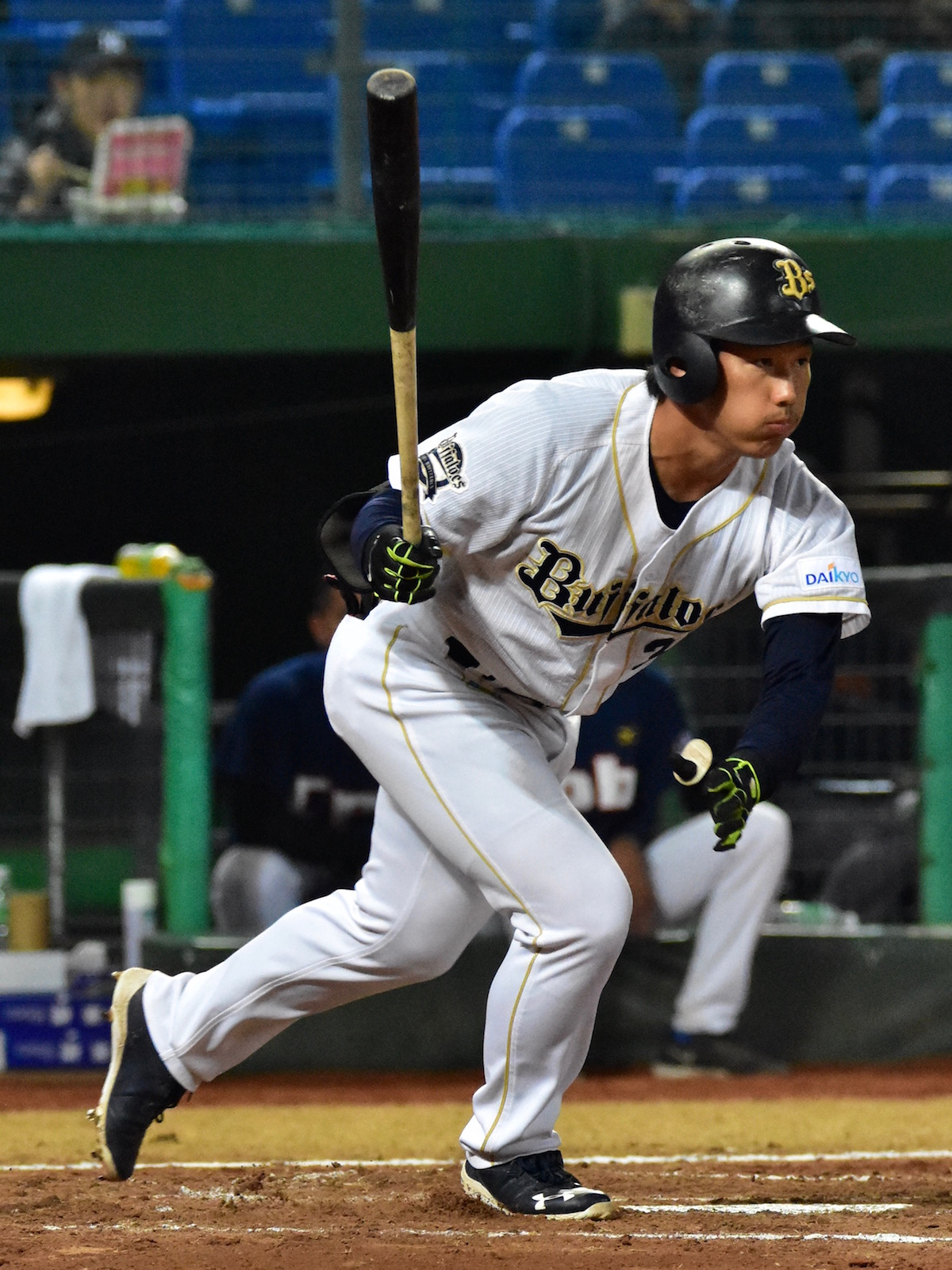
- Yoshida with the Orix Buffaloes in 2016

Boston Red Sox – No. 7
- Designated hitter / Outfielder
- Born: July 15, 1993 (age 33); Fukui, Japan
- Bats: Left Throws: Right

Professional debut
- NPB: March 25, 2016, for the Orix Buffaloes
- MLB: March 30, 2023, for the Boston Red Sox

NPB statistics (through 2022 season)
- Batting average: .327
- Hits: 884
- Home runs: 133
- Runs batted in: 467

MLB statistics (through 2026 season)
- Batting average: .280
- Hits: 383
- Home runs: 34
- Runs batted in: 182
- Stats at Baseball Reference

Teams
- Orix Buffaloes (2016–2022); Boston Red Sox (2023–present)

Career highlights and awards
- NPB: Japan Series champion (2022); 4× NPB All-Star (2018, 2019, 2021, 2022); 5× Pacific League Best Nine Award (2018–2022); 2× Pacific League batting champion (2020, 2021); International: All-World Baseball Classic Team (2023)
Medals
Men's baseball
Representing Japan
Summer Olympics
Gold medal – first place	2020 Tokyo	Team
World Baseball Classic
Gold medal – first place	2023 Miami	Team
WBSC Premier12
Gold medal – first place	2019 Tokyo	Team

Masataka Yoshida (Japanese: 吉田 正尚, Hepburn: Yoshida Masataka; pronounced [joɕida masaꜜtaka]; born July 5, 1993), shortened by teammates to “Masa”, nicknamed Macho Man, is a Japanese professional baseball designated hitter and left fielder for the Boston Red Sox of Major League Baseball (MLB). He started his professional career with the Orix Buffaloes of Nippon Professional Baseball (NPB).

== Early life ==
Yoshida was born July 15, 1993, in Fukui, Japan. Yoshida graduated from Tsuruga Kehi High School and played baseball. Yoshida played college baseball for Aoyama Gakuin University and was selected by the Orix Buffaloes in the first round of the 2015 NPB draft.

== Professional career ==
=== Orix Buffaloes ===
Yoshida first played in NPB for Orix during the 2016 season, when he had a .290 batting average with 10 home runs and 34 runs batted in (RBI) in 63 games. In 2017, he played 64 games with Orix, batting .311 with 12 home runs and 38 RBIs. In 2018 and 2019, he played 143 games each season, batting .321 and .322, respectively, with an aggregate 55 home runs and 171 RBI for the two seasons. For 2020 through 2022, he had batting averages of .350, .339, and .335, with a total of 56 home runs and 224 RBI in 349 games played across the three seasons.

Yoshida hit two home runs in Game 5 of the 2022 Japan Series, including a walk-off; Orix won the series in seven games (one game ended in a tie) over the Tokyo Yakult Swallows.

In seven seasons with Orix—2016 through 2022—Yoshida compiled a .327 batting average along with 467 RBI and 133 home runs in 762 games.

=== Boston Red Sox ===
On December 7, 2022, Yoshida was posted by Orix and made available to all 30 Major League Baseball (MLB) teams, opening a 30-day period to negotiate a contract. On December 15, Yoshida signed a five-year contract with the Boston Red Sox, reportedly worth $90 million. In January 2023, he was ranked 87th in the Baseball America list of baseball's top 100 prospects, as the publication includes NPB players joining MLB in their rankings. That ranking was considered "alarmingly low" by Peter Abraham, the Red Sox beat writer for The Boston Globe. On April 23, 2023, Yoshida hit two home runs in the same inning, including a grand slam, in a game against the Milwaukee Brewers. Yoshida was named AL Player of the Week for the week of May 1–7, having gone 12-for-25 with a 1.319 OPS and not a single swing and a miss in this period. For the season, Yoshida appeared in 140 games (84 starts in left field, 49 starts as designated hitter) while batting .289 with 15 home runs and 72 RBI.

For the 2024 season, the Red Sox decided to use Yoshida primarily as a designated hitter, with manager Alex Cora commenting about playing Yoshida in the outfield, "If we have to, we have to, but we prefer not." For the season, Yoshida played only one inning of one game in the outfield. At the plate, he appeared in 108 games, batting .280 with 10 home runs and 56 RBI. After the season, in early October, Yoshida underwent right shoulder labral repair surgery.

Yoshida started the 2025 season on the injured list, as a result of the shoulder surgery he underwent during the offseason. He was transferred to the 60-day injured list on May 22, 2025. As of late June, Yoshida was still on the injured list, although practicing in the outfield and taking batting practice at Fenway Park. He was activated from the injured list on July 9.

== International career ==
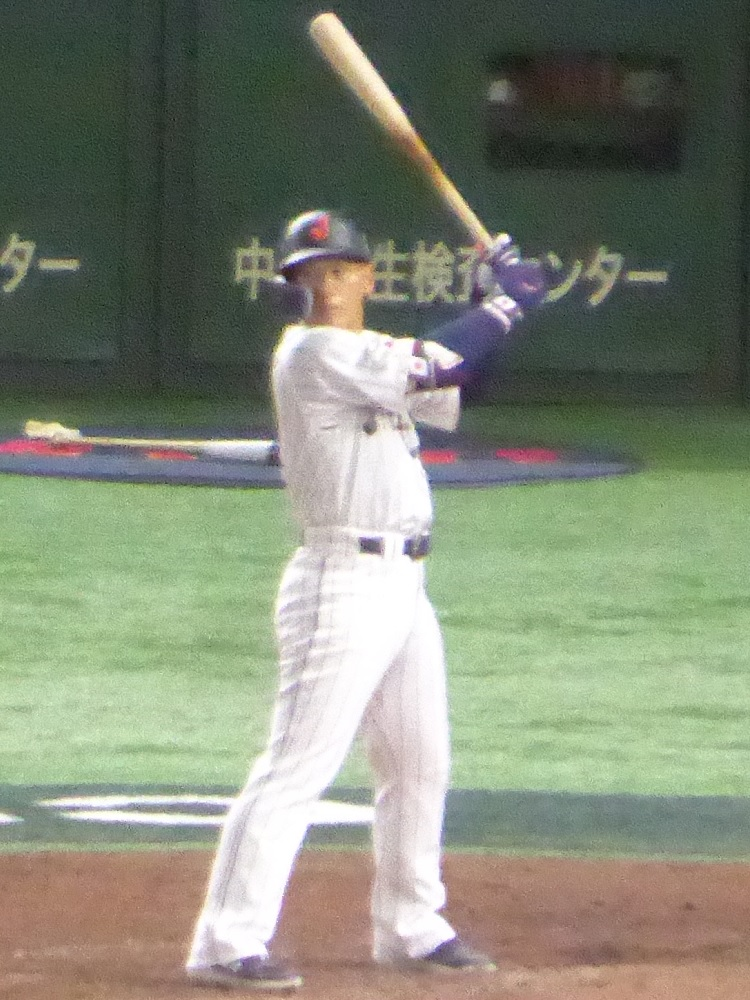
Yoshida with the WBC Japan national team at Tokyo Dome on March 16, 2023

Yoshida represented the Japan national baseball team in the 2014 Haarlem Baseball Week, 2015 Summer Universiade, 2019 exhibition games against Mexico, and 2019 WBSC Premier12.

On February 27, 2019, he was selected to the 2019 exhibition games against Mexico.

On October 1, 2019, he was selected to the 2019 WBSC Premier12.

In 2023, Yoshida represented Japan in the World Baseball Classic. He set a tournament record for RBIs with 13. At the end of the tournament, he was named to the All-Classic Team.

== Personal life ==
Masataka has a wife named Yurika and two daughters who have been living with him in Boston since the 2024 Red Sox season.
