= Matt Shaw (baseball) =

American baseball player (born 2001)

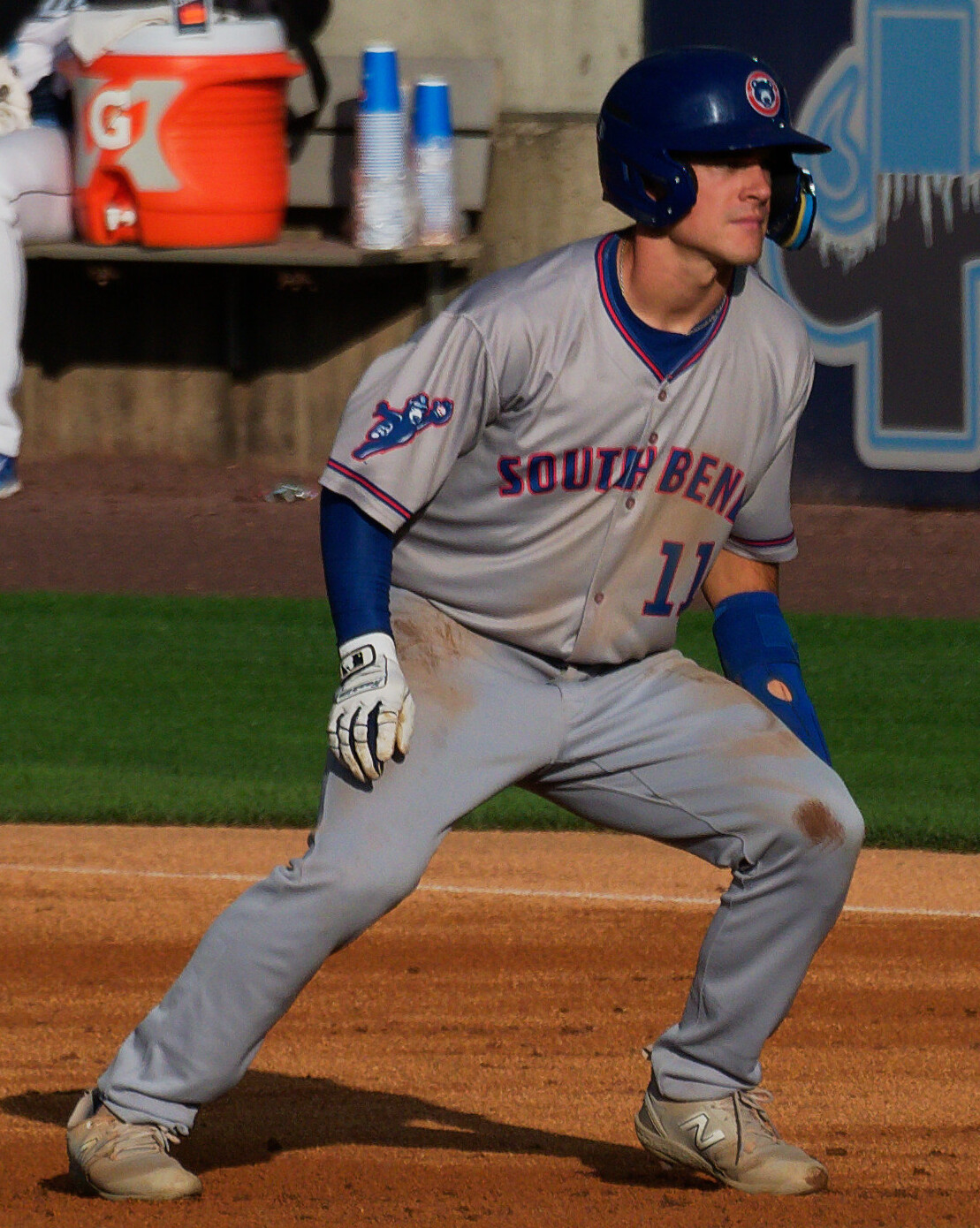
- Shaw with the South Bend Cubs in 2023

Chicago Cubs – No. 6
- Utility Player
- Born: November 6, 2001 (age 24); Springfield, Massachusetts, U.S.
- Bats: Right Throws: Right

MLB debut
- March 18, 2025, for the Chicago Cubs

MLB statistics (through 2026 season)
- Batting average: .230
- Home runs: 18
- Runs batted in: 68
- Stats at Baseball Reference

Teams
- Chicago Cubs (2025–present)
Medals
Men's baseball
Representing United States
WBSC Premier12
Bronze medal – third place	2024 Tokyo	Team

Matthew James Shaw (born November 6, 2001) is an American professional baseball utility player for the Chicago Cubs of Major League Baseball (MLB). He made his MLB debut in 2025.

== Early life and amateur career ==
Shaw grew up in Brimfield, Massachusetts and initially attended Wilbraham & Monson Academy before transferring to Worcester Academy. He played summer collegiate baseball after graduating from the Worcester Bravehearts of the Futures Collegiate Baseball League (FCBL).

As a freshman for the Maryland Terrapins, Shaw was named to the Big Ten Conference All-Freshman team after batting .332 with 42 runs scored and 30 RBIs. After the season, he returned to the FCBL and played for the Amsterdam Mohawks. Back with the Terrapins, Shaw was named first team All-Big Ten as a sophomore after batting .290 with 22 home runs and 67 RBIs. During the summer of 2022, he played for the Bourne Braves of the Cape Cod Baseball League, where he hit .360 and was named the league's MVP. Shaw became Maryland's all-time leader in home runs during his junior season. After the 2023 season, he won the Brooks Wallace Award.

== Professional career ==
The Chicago Cubs selected Shaw in the first round, with the 13th overall selection, of the 2023 Major League Baseball draft. On July 14, 2023, Shaw signed with the Cubs for the full slot value of $4.85 million. He split his first professional season between the rookie-level Arizona Complex League Cubs, High-A South Bend Cubs, and Double-A Tennessee Smokies.

Shaw split the 2024 campaign between Tennessee and the Triple-A Iowa Cubs, playing in 121 total games and hitting .284/.379/.488 with 21 home runs, 71 RBI, and 31 stolen bases. He won the 2024 Southern League Most Valuable Player Award with Tennessee.

On March 17, 2025, Shaw had his contract selected after making Chicago's Opening Day roster. Shaw made his MLB debut on March 18, during the MLB Tokyo Series. Shaw recorded an infield single as his first career hit as a major leaguer the following day. On March 29, Shaw entered a game in the eight inning as a pinch hitter and hit his first career home run off of Jalen Beeks of the Arizona Diamondbacks.

Shaw struggled offensively as the Cubs' starting third baseman, batting .172 with only two extra-base hits in 18 games. He was demoted to the Cubs' Triple-A Iowa affiliate. On May 19, he was recalled to the major league club and began another long slump. On July 3, Shaw hit a walk-off sacrifice fly in extra innings to score the zombie runner in a 1-0 victory over Cleveland. After some mechanical adjustments, Shaw had a much stronger second half of the season. He finished among the leaders at third base in wRC+ and defensive runs saved.

During the 2026 season, Shaw appeared in 77 games for the Cubs, batting .250 with 5 home runs and 22 RBIs. Despite missing significant time due to a left-hand sprain suffered in June, he returned to help the Cubs reach the postseason, where they would go on to lose in the National League Wild Card Series against the San Diego Padres.

== International career ==
Shaw was named to the United States national baseball team for the 2024 WBSC Premier12. He was named to the All-World Team as the best third baseman. He also led the tournament in runs batted in.

== Personal life ==
Shaw is a Christian. In February 2025, Shaw married his wife, Danielle.

During a late-season series against the Cincinnati Reds, manager Craig Counsell told reporters that Shaw missed a game to attend a "funeral of a friend." An anonymous league source subsequently told The Athletic that he had attended the memorial service of Charlie Kirk in Glendale, Arizona. Shaw later defended the decision. He said he had been friends with Charlie Kirk since meeting him in the apartment complex where he lived in Arizona. He said Kirk texted him after every Cubs game.

In December 2025, Shaw spoke at Turning Point USA AmericaFest 2025. Dan Freedman speculated in Forbes that Shaw's politics may have made it difficult for the Cubs to trade him in the 2025–26 offseason after the team signed free agent third baseman Alex Bregman.
