= Ryan Ward (baseball) =

American baseball player (born 1998)

- Ward with the Oklahoma City Comets in 2026

Chunichi Dragons
- Outfielder / First baseman
- Born: February 23, 1998 (age 28); Worcester, Massachusetts, U.S.
- Bats: Left Throws: Right

MLB debut
- April 19, 2026, for the Los Angeles Dodgers

MLB statistics (through 2026 season)
- Batting average: .218
- Home runs: 3
- Runs batted in: 12
- Stats at Baseball Reference

Teams
- Los Angeles Dodgers (2026)
Medals
Men's baseball
Representing United States
WBSC Premier12
| Bronze medal – third place | 2024 Tokyo | Team |

Ryan Joseph Ward (born February 23, 1998) is an American professional baseball outfielder and first baseman for the Chunichi Dragons of Nippon Professional Baseball (NPB). He has previously played in Major League Baseball (MLB) for the Los Angeles Dodgers.

== Amateur career ==
Ward attended Millbury High School in Millbury, Massachusetts, where he played baseball and golf. As a junior in 2015, he hit .525 with three home runs, 19 RBI, and seven doubles over 59 at-bats. He went unselected in the 2016 Major League Baseball draft and enrolled at Bryant University to play college baseball. During the summer of 2016, he played for the Worcester Bravehearts of the Futures Collegiate Baseball League.

Ward started the first 10 games of his freshman season at Bryant in 2017 before he broke his wrist, forcing him to miss the remainder of the year. As a sophomore in 2018, he batted .409 with eight home runs, 52 RBI, 22 doubles, and 101 hits over 56 starts. That summer, he played in the New England Collegiate Baseball League with the Ocean State Waves. As a junior in 2019, he played in 58 games and hit .382 with 13 home runs, 51 RBI, and 12 stolen bases.

== Professional career ==
=== Los Angeles Dodgers ===
Ward was selected by the Los Angeles Dodgers in the eighth round (251st overall) selection in the 2019 Major League Baseball draft. He signed with the Dodgers and spent his first professional season with the Ogden Raptors, batting .271 with four home runs, 23 RBI, and 11 doubles over 49 games. Ward did not play a game in 2020 due to the cancellation of the minor league season because of the COVID-19 pandemic.

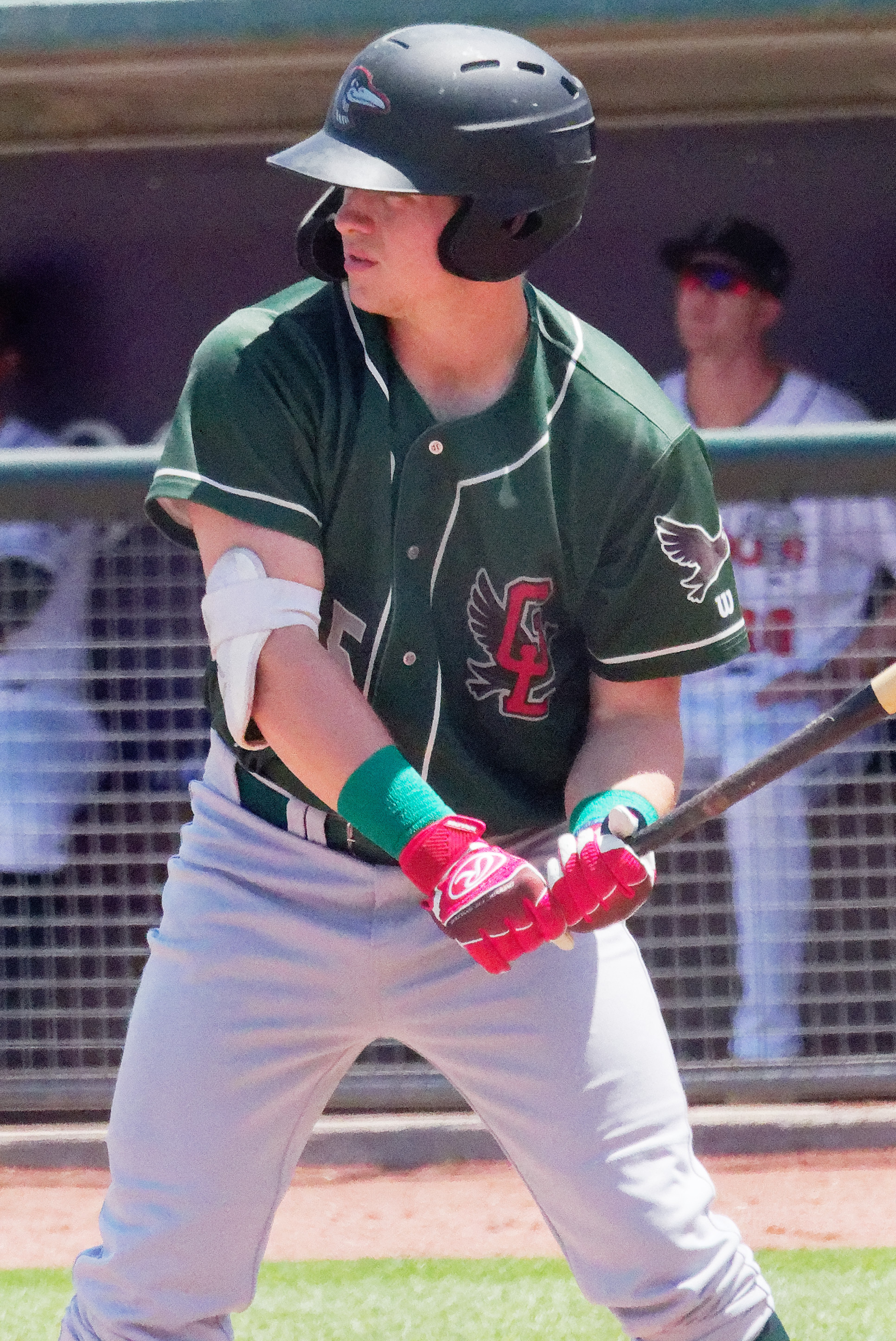
Ward with the Great Lakes Loons in 2021

Ward spent the 2021 season with the Great Lakes Loons and slashed .278/.352/.524 with 27 home runs, 84 RBI, and 21 doubles over 109 games. He spent the 2022 season with the Tulsa Drillers, where he hit .255 in 116 games with 28 home runs and 78 RBI. To open the 2023 season, he was assigned to the Oklahoma City Comets. He played in 139 games for them, hitting .234 with 21 homers and 95 RBI. He returned to Oklahoma City in 2024, playing in 120 games with a .258 batting average, 33 home runs, and 101 RBI. In 2025, he played his third straight season in Oklahoma City, with a .290 batting average, 36 home runs and 122 RBI in 143 games. He won the Joe Bauman Award for the most home runs in minor league baseball. He was also selected for the Pacific Coast League Most Valuable Player Award. The Dodgers added him to their 40-man roster after the season to prevent him from becoming a minor league free agent.

Ward was called up to the major leagues for the first time on April 19, 2026, to make his debut as the starting first baseman against the Colorado Rockies. During the game, Ward recorded his first major league hit off Michael Lorenzen. He was optioned back to Oklahoma City on April 21. Ward hit his first major league home run off Andrew Painter in a 9-1 win against the Philadelphia Phillies on May 31. On June 10, he hit a grand slam off Carmen Mlodzinski of the Pittsburgh Pirates. Ward played in 20 games for the Dodgers, hitting .218 with three home runs and 12 RBI. In 105 games for the Comets, he batted .248 with 18 home runs and 82 RBI. On September 16, Ward was designated for assignment by the Dodgers.

=== Chunichi Dragons ===
On September 22, 2026, Ward's contract was sold to the Chunichi Dragons of Nippon Professional Baseball.

== International career ==
Ward played for the United States national baseball team at the 2024 WBSC Premier12, where he was named to the All-World Team as the top designated hitter and led the tournament in home runs.
