= Shōgo Sakakura =

Japanese baseball player (born 1998)

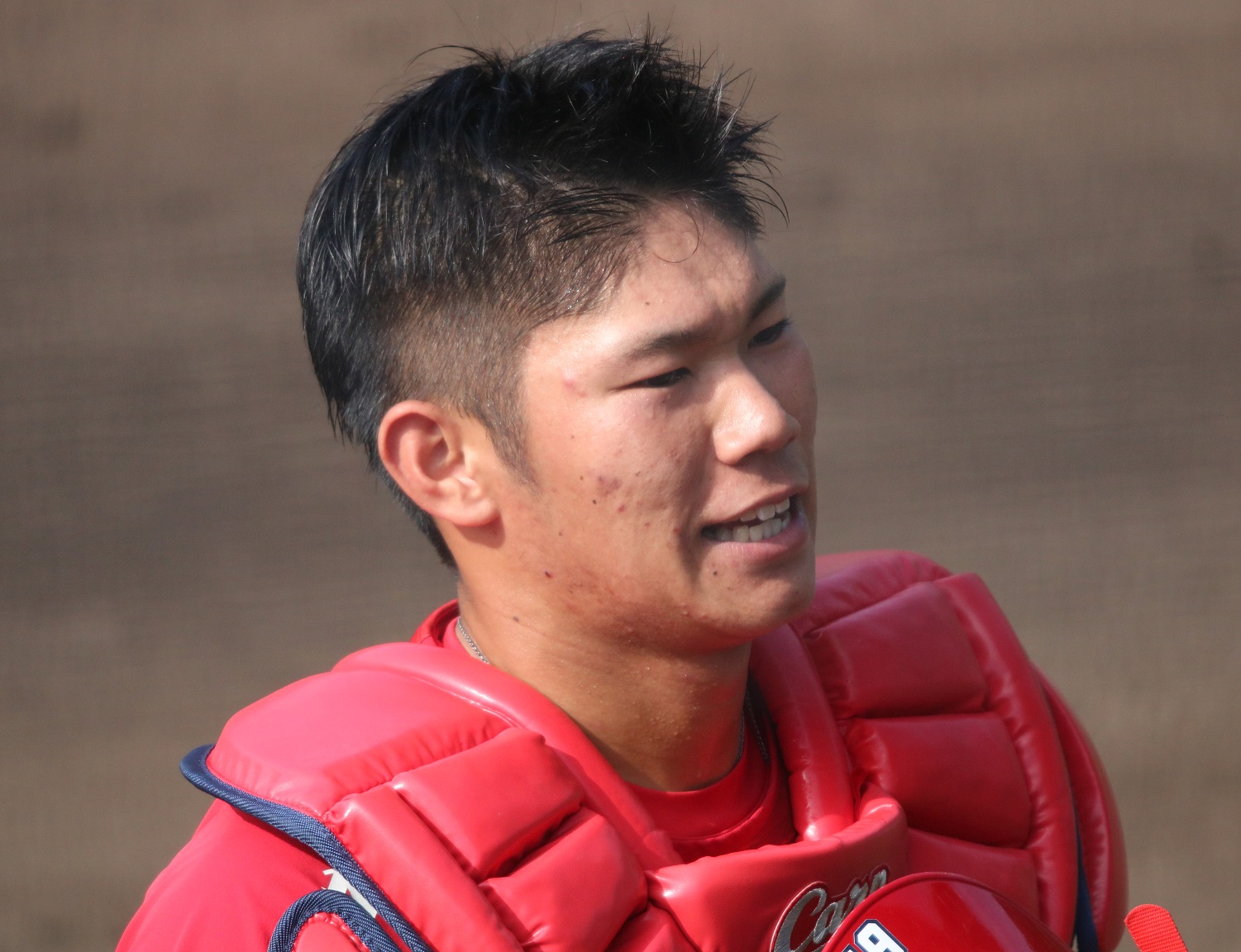

Hiroshima Toyo Carp – No. 31
- Catcher
- Born: May 29, 1998 (age 27); Inba, Chiba, Japan
- Bats: Left Throws: Right

NPB debut
- September 23, 2017, for the Hiroshima Toyo Carp

NPB statistics (through 2025 season)
- Batting average: .278
- Hits: 670
- Home runs: 61
- Runs batted in: 297
- Stats at Baseball Reference

Teams
- Hiroshima Toyo Carp (2017–present)

Career highlights and awards
- NPB: 3× NPB All-Star (2022, 2024–2025); International: WBSC Premier12 All-World Team (2024)
Medals
Men's baseball
Representing Japan
WBSC Premier12
Silver medal – second place	2024	Team

Shōgo Sakakura (坂倉 将吾, Sakakura Shōgo; born May 29, 1998) is a Japanese professional baseball catcher for the Hiroshima Toyo Carp of Nippon Professional Baseball (NPB).
