= 2024 WBSC Premier12 =

International baseball tournament

Tournament details
- Countries: Japan; Mexico; Taiwan
- Dates: November 9–24
- Teams: 12

Final positions
- Champions: Chinese Taipei (1st title)
- Runners-up: Japan
- Third place: United States
- Fourth place: Venezuela

Tournament statistics
- Games played: 38
- Attendance: 518,636 (13,648 per game)

Awards
- MVP: (Chinese Taipei) Chieh-Hsien Chen

The 2024 WBSC Premier12 was the 3rd edition of the WBSC Premier12, a baseball championship featuring the 12 highest-ranked national teams in the world, held by the World Baseball Softball Confederation (WBSC). Originally scheduled for 2023, but delayed due to COVID-19, the championship was held from November 9 to 24, 2024, in Japan, Mexico, and Taiwan.

Taiwan won the championship, defeating final round hosts and defending champions Japan, 4–0, in the championship game. It was Chinese Taipei's first Premier12 championship and their first overall senior international baseball title ever.

The United States took third place after a 6–1 win over Venezuela.

== Teams ==
The 12 highest-ranked national teams qualified to participate in the 2024 WBSC Premier 12, based on the WBSC World Rankings, as of 18 December 2023. On 20 December, the 12 teams were confirmed, with the only difference from 2019 was Canada being replaced by debutants Panama. The WBSC had originally wanted to expand this edition but due to COVID-19, halted the plans for a future edition.

Africa (0)

- None qualified

Asia (3)

- Chinese Taipei
- Japan
- South Korea

List of qualified teams Team qualified

Americas (7)

- Cuba
- Dominican Republic
- Mexico
- Panama
- Puerto Rico
- United States
- Venezuela

Europe (1)

- Netherlands

Oceania (1)

- Australia

Top 12 Rankings as of December 18, 2023
Rank	Team	Points	Confederation
1	Japan	5797	BFA
2	Mexico	4764	COPABE
3	United States	4492	COPABE
4	South Korea	4353	BFA
5	Chinese Taipei	4170	BFA
6	Venezuela	3975	COPABE
7	Netherlands	3288	CEB
8	Cuba	3121	COPABE
9	Dominican Republic	2667	COPABE
10	Panama	2534	COPABE
11	Australia	2367	BCO
12	Puerto Rico	2355	COPABE

== Rosters ==
Participating nations had to submit their final 28-man rosters no later than 10 October 2024. WBSC rules required teams to carry at least 13 pitchers and two catchers in their squads.

== Format ==
The format underwent a slightly different format compared to 2019.

=== Opening Round ===
The tournament began with two groups of six teams each playing in the 12-team Opening Round. Each team played five games, in a round robin format against each other in the group. The top two teams from each group advanced to the Super Round.

=== Super Round ===
The four remaining teams who advanced to the Super Round, traveled to Japan where they played against the top two teams that advanced from the other group.

After completion, the teams who finished first and second played the gold medal match, while the teams placed third and fourth played for bronze.

== Venues ==
Six stadiums were used during the tournament. Japanese cities, Nagoya and Tokyo plus the Taiwanese capital, Taipei, were confirmed as host cities on 11 September 2023, while a then-unknown country from the Americas was scheduled to host the event too. That then-unknown country turned out to be Mexico, with venues in Guadalajara and Tepic being chosen to host an Opening Round group on 4 April 2024.

Group A	Group B	
Guadalajara, Mexico	Taipei, Taiwan	Nagoya, Japan
Estadio Panamericano	Taipei Dome	Vantelin Dome Nagoya
Capacity: 16,500	Capacity: 40,000	Capacity: 36,418
2024 WBSC Premier12 is located in Mexico	2024 WBSC Premier12 is located in Taiwan	2024 WBSC Premier12 is located in Japan
Group A	Group B	Super Round and Medal rounds
Tepic, Mexico	Taipei, Taiwan	Tokyo, Japan
Coloso del Pacífico	Taipei Tianmu Baseball Stadium	Tokyo Dome
Capacity: 9,480	Capacity: 10,500	Capacity: 45,600

== Opening round ==
The groups were announced on 18 April 2024. The schedule was announced on 28 May 2024.

=== Group A ===
Pos	Team	Pld	W	L	RF	RA	RD	PCT	GB	Qualification
1	Venezuela	5	4	1	31	13	+18	.800	—	Advance to Super Round
2	United States	5	3	2	36	13	+23	.600 (Note: Head to head results: Panama 3–9 United States)	1	Advance to Super Round
3	Panama	5	3	2	22	25	−3	.600	1	
4	Mexico (H)	5	2	3	23	34	−11	.400 (Note: Head to head results: Mexico 8–6 Netherlands)	2	
5	Netherlands	5	2	3	37	47	−10	.400	2	
6	Puerto Rico	5	1	4	19	36	−17	.200	3	

Source: WBSC
Rules for classification: 1) Wins; 2) Head to head; 3) Head to head Team's Quality Balance; 4) Earned Runs Team's Quality Balance; 5) Head to head highest batting average; 6) Coin toss
(H) Hosts
Notes:

Date	Local time	Road team	Score	Home team	Inn.	Venue	Game duration	Attendance	Boxscore
9 November	13:00	Panama	8–9	Netherlands	10	Estadio Panamericano	3:29	347	Boxscore
9 November	16:00	Puerto Rico	1–0	United States		Coloso del Pacífico	3:07	7,820	Boxscore
9 November	20:00	Venezuela	8–4	Mexico		Estadio Panamericano	3:24	9,758	Boxscore
10 November	13:00	Venezuela	2–4	Panama		Estadio Panamericano	2:36	414	Boxscore
10 November	16:00	Netherlands	2–12	United States	8	Coloso del Pacífico	2:32	5,133	Boxscore
10 November	20:00	Mexico	7–5	Puerto Rico		Estadio Panamericano	3:32	2,921	Boxscore
11 November	19:00	United States	3–5	Venezuela		Coloso del Pacífico	2:52	7,018	Boxscore
11 November	20:00	Panama	3–2	Mexico		Estadio Panamericano	3:09	1,921	Boxscore
12 November	19:00	Panama	3–9	United States		Coloso del Pacífico	3:12	4,320	Boxscore
12 November	20:00	Netherlands	20–8	Puerto Rico	7	Estadio Panamericano	2:46	622	Boxscore
13 November	13:00	Puerto Rico	2–5	Venezuela		Estadio Panamericano	2:53	533	Boxscore
13 November	20:00	Mexico	8–6	Netherlands		Estadio Panamericano	3:20	2,257	Boxscore
14 November	13:00	Netherlands	0–11	Venezuela	7	Estadio Panamericano	1:59	239	Boxscore
14 November	19:00	Puerto Rico	3–4	Panama		Coloso del Pacífico	2:52	7,240	Boxscore
14 November	20:00	United States	12–2	Mexico	7	Estadio Panamericano	2:45	9,721	Boxscore

=== Group B ===
Pos	Team	Pld	W	L	RF	RA	RD	PCT	GB	Qualification
1	Japan (H)	5	5	0	36	16	+20	1.000	—	Advance to Super Round
2	Chinese Taipei (H)	5	4	1	22	10	+12	.800	1	Advance to Super Round
3	South Korea	5	3	2	28	24	+4	.600	2	
4	Australia	5	1	4	16	29	−13	.200 (Note: Tied on head to head results. Head to head Team's Quality Balance: Australia 0.24, Dominican Republic −0.02, Cuba −0.21.)	4	
5	Dominican Republic	5	1	4	16	28	−12	.200	4	
6	Cuba	5	1	4	15	26	−11	.200	4	

Source: WBSC
Rules for classification: 1) Wins; 2) Head to head; 3) Head to head Team's Quality Balance; 4) Earned Runs Team's Quality Balance; 5) Head to head highest batting average; 6) Coin toss
(H) Hosts
Notes:

Date	Local time	Road team	Score	Home team	Inn.	Venue	Game duration	Attendance	Boxscore
13 November	18:30	Dominican Republic	6–1	Cuba		Tianmu Stadium	3:09	255	Boxscore
13 November	18:30	South Korea	3–6	Chinese Taipei		Taipei Dome	2:56	39,000	Boxscore
13 November	19:00	Australia	3–9	Japan		Vantelin Dome Nagoya	3:13	30,691	Boxscore
14 November	18:00	Cuba	4–8	South Korea		Tianmu Stadium	3:16	2,225	Boxscore
14 November	18:30	Chinese Taipei	2–1	Dominican Republic		Taipei Dome	3:00	25,000	Boxscore
15 November	15:00	Dominican Republic	0–5	Australia		Tianmu Stadium	2:41	1,112	Boxscore
15 November	18:00	South Korea	3–6	Japan		Taipei Dome	3:31	20,028	Boxscore
16 November	12:00	Australia	3–4	Cuba		Tianmu Stadium	3:19	1,418	Boxscore
16 November	18:00	Japan	3–1	Chinese Taipei		Taipei Dome	3:19	34,882	Boxscore
16 November	18:30	Dominican Republic	6–9	South Korea		Tianmu Stadium	3:36	3,387	Boxscore
17 November	18:00	Cuba	6–7	Japan		Tianmu Stadium	4:07	4,955	Boxscore
17 November	18:30	Chinese Taipei	11–3	Australia		Taipei Dome	4:07	34,166	Boxscore
18 November	12:00	Australia	2–5	South Korea		Tianmu Stadium	3:21	1,799	Boxscore
18 November	18:00	Japan	11–3	Dominican Republic		Tianmu Stadium	3:22	2,572	Boxscore
18 November	18:30	Cuba	0–2	Chinese Taipei		Taipei Dome	2:59	30,924	Boxscore

== Super Round ==
Pos	Team	Pld	W	L	RF	RA	RD	PCT	GB	Qualification
1	Japan (H)	3	3	0	27	13	+14	1.000	—	Advance to gold medal game
2	Chinese Taipei	3	1	2	14	13	+1	.333 (Note: Tied on head to head results. Head to head Team's Quality Balance: Chinese Taipei 0.21, Venezuela 0.08, United States –0.28.)	2	Advance to gold medal game
3	Venezuela	3	1	2	13	15	−2	.333	2	Advance to bronze medal game
4	United States	3	1	2	9	22	−13	.333	2	Advance to bronze medal game

Source: WBSC
Rules for classification: 1) Wins; 2) Head to head; 3) Head to head Team's Quality Balance; 4) Earned Runs Team's Quality Balance; 5) Head to head highest batting average; 6) Coin toss
(H) Hosts
Notes:

The order of the Super Round games could change.

Date	Local time	Road team	Score	Home team	Inn.	Venue	Game duration	Attendance	Boxscore
21 November	12:00	Chinese Taipei	0–2	Venezuela		Tokyo Dome	2:39	6,790	Boxscore
21 November	19:00	United States	1–9	Japan		Tokyo Dome	3:07	25,428	Boxscore
22 November	12:00	Chinese Taipei	8–2	United States		Tokyo Dome	3:29	9,472	Boxscore
22 November	19:00	Venezuela	6–9	Japan		Tokyo Dome	3:52	33,300	Boxscore
23 November	12:00	United States	6–5	Venezuela		Tokyo Dome	3:18	8,868	Boxscore
23 November	19:00	Chinese Taipei	6–9	Japan		Tokyo Dome	3:18	41,674	Boxscore

== Finals ==
=== Bronze medal game ===
Date	Local time	Road team	Score	Home team	Inn.	Venue	Game duration	Attendance	Boxscore
24 November	12:00	United States	6–1	Venezuela		Tokyo Dome	3:07	8,386	Boxscore

=== Championship final ===
Date	Local time	Road team	Score	Home team	Inn.	Venue	Game duration	Attendance	Boxscore
24 November	19:00	Chinese Taipei	4–0	Japan		Tokyo Dome	2:57	41,827	Boxscore

== Final standings ==
Rk	Team	W	L
1	Chinese Taipei	6	3
2	Japan	8	1
Bronze medal game
3	United States	5	4
4	Venezuela	5	4
Eliminated in Group stage
5	South Korea	3	2
5	Panama	3	2
7	Australia	1	4
7	Mexico	2	3
9	Dominican Republic	1	4
9	Netherlands	2	3
11	Cuba	1	4
11	Puerto Rico	1	4

2024 WBSC Premier 12

Chinese Taipei
1st title

== Prize money ==
The WBSC gave $5.2 million in prize money to participants, distributed as follows, with a minimum of half of a team's prize money being distributed equally among its players:

- Winner: US$1,500,000
- 2nd Place: US$750,000
- 3rd Place: US$500,000
- 4th Place: US$350,000
- 5th Place: US$300,000
- 6th Place: US$250,000
- 7–12th Place: US$180,000 each
- Each win in Opening Round: US$10,000
- Each win in Super Round: US$20,000
- 1st Place in Opening Round: US$20,000

== Statistical leaders ==
=== Batting ===
Statistic	Name	Total/Avg
Batting average*	(Chinese Taipei) Chen Chieh-hsien	.625
Hits	(United States) Chandler Simpson	17
Runs	(Japan) Shōta Morishita	13
Home runs	(United States) Ryan Ward	5
Runs batted in	(United States) Matt Shaw	14
Strikeouts	(United States) Luke Ritter	13
Stolen bases	(United States) Chandler Simpson	9
On-base percentage*	(Chinese Taipei) Chen Chieh-hsien	.700
Slugging percentage*	(South Korea) Kim Do-yeong	1.059
OPS*	(Chinese Taipei) Chen Chieh-hsien	1.617

* Minimum 2 plate appearances per team game

=== Pitching ===
Statistic	Name	Total/Avg
ERA	7 tied with (Note: Alberto Baldonado, Jorge Benitez, Chang Yi, Been Gwak, Rich Hill, Franklyn Kilome, Seohyeon Kim)	0.00
Wins	2 tied with (Note: Chang Yi, Haruto Inoue)	2
Losses	3 tied with (Note: Sam Benschoter, Po-Ching Chen, Liván Moinelo)	2
Saves	(Chinese Taipei) Chun-Wei Wu	3
Innings pitched	(Chinese Taipei) Huang Tzu-peng	12.0
Hits allowed	(Netherlands) Shairon Martis	17
Runs allowed	(Netherlands) Shairon Martis	15
Earned runs allowed	(Netherlands) Shairon Martis	15
Walks	(Japan) Takahisa Hayakawa	10
Strikeouts	2 tied with (Note: Hiroto Takahashi, Chihiro Sumida)	16
WHIP*	(Chinese Taipei) Huang Tzu-peng	0.50

* Minimum 0.8 innings pitched per team game

== Awards ==
Following the conclusion of the tournament, the WBSC announced the Premier12 All-World Team and individual awards winners.

All-World Team
Position	Player
Starting Pitcher	(United States) Rich Hill
Relief Pitcher	(Venezuela) Oddanier Mosqueda
Catcher	(Japan) Shōgo Sakakura
First Baseman	(Venezuela) Carlos Pérez
Second Baseman	(Japan) Kaito Kozono
Third Baseman	(United States) Matt Shaw
Shortstop	(Netherlands) Didi Gregorius
Outfielders	(United States) Chandler Simpson (Chinese Taipei) Chen Chieh-hsien (Japan) Shōta Morishita
Designated Hitter	(United States) Ryan Ward

Individual Awards
Award	Player	Value
Most Valuable Player	(Chinese Taipei) Chen Chieh-hsien	
Best Batting Average	(Chinese Taipei) Chen Chieh-hsien	B-AVE .632
Pitcher with Best ERA	(United States) Rich Hill	0.00 ERA
Pitcher with Best Win/Loss Average	(Japan) Haruto Inoue	3W – 0L
Most Runs Batted In	(United States) Matt Shaw	14 RBI
Home Run King	(United States) Ryan Ward	5 HR
Most Stolen Bases	(United States) Chandler Simpson	9 SB
Most Runs Scored	(Japan) Shōta Morishita	13 Runs
Outstanding Defensive Player	(Chinese Taipei) Chen Chieh-hsien	0 ERR

== Sponsors ==
2024 WBSC Premier12 had 36 sponsors, including 6 global sponsors.

Sponsors of the 2024 WBSC Premier12
Global Sponsors
- Konami
- RAXUS
- Kowa
- Nippon Express
- Daiso
- Kao Corporation
Super/Final Round Sponsors
- Coca-Cola
- MUFG Bank
- Yomiuri Shimbun
- Lawson
- Japan Airlines
- Fanatics
Group A Sponsors
- Mega
- Red Cola
Group B Sponsors
- CTBC
- Taiwan Sports Lottery
- Family Mart
- Eva Air
- Barista Coffee
- TransGlobe Life Insurance
- Chunghwa Telecom
- GFC, Ltd.
- Capital Motors, Inc.
- 1664
- J&G Fried Chicken
- Kinmen Kaoliang Liquor
- CPC Corporation
- Taiwan Select
- Hotel Episode
- Uni-president
- New Balance
- Domino's
- Burger King

== Broadcasting rights ==
Territory	Rights holder(s)
Mexico	Megacable; TVC Deportes
Taiwan	Videoland Television Network; Eastern Broadcasting Company; ELTA Technology Co., Ltd. GetWin
Japan	TBS; TV Asahi; Amazon Prime Video; J Sports
United States and Canada	DAZN
Nicaragua	Canal 4
Panama	Cable Onda Sport
Venezuela	SimpleTV
Colombia	Win Sports
Dominican Republic	VTV Canal 32
Cuba	Tele Rebelde
Korea	SPOTV
Netherlands	NOS
Aruba, Bonaire, Curaçao, Saba, St Eustatius and St. Marteen	Nos Pais Television
All other markets	GameTime; DAZN

== See also ==
- List of sporting events in Taiwan
