= Jonathan Jones (baseball) =

American baseball player (born 1989)

- Outfielder
- Born: August 2, 1989 (age 36); Vacaville, California, U.S.
- Bats: Right Throws: Right
- Stats at Baseball Reference

Career highlights and awards
- WBSC Premier12 All-World Team (2019)
Medals
Men's baseball
Representing Mexico
WBSC Premier12
| Bronze medal – third place | 2019 Tokyo | National team |

Jonathan D. Jones (born August 2, 1989) is an American former professional baseball outfielder who played internationally for the Mexico national baseball team at the 2020 Olympics.

== Amateur career ==
Jones graduated from Vanden High School in Fairfield, California, in 2007. He attended California State University, Long Beach, where he played college baseball for the Long Beach State Dirtbags. In 2009, he played collegiate summer baseball with the Yarmouth–Dennis Red Sox of the Cape Cod Baseball League.

== Professional career ==
=== Toronto Blue Jays ===
Jones was drafted by the Toronto Blue Jays in the 29th round, with the 876th overall selection, of the 2010 MLB draft. He made his professional debut in 2010 with the Gulf Coast Blue Jays, and was later promoted to Low–A Auburn Doubledays. In 2011, Jones split the season between the Low–A Vancouver Canadians and Single–A Lansing Lugnuts, posting a combined .288/.366/.360 line with 2 home runs and 41 RBIs. He was promoted in 2012 to the High-A Dunedin Blue Jays, batting .266 with 28 RBIs and 25 stolen bases. Following the 2012 season, he played winter ball with the Canberra Cavalry of the Australian Baseball League. Jones appeared in 8 games for the Cavalry before a hamstring injury ended his season prematurely.

In 2013, Jones began the season in Dunedin, spending the year there aside from a short stint with the Double-A New Hampshire Fisher Cats. In 2014, López was promoted to the Fisher Cats, where he slashed .233/.302/.314 with 1 home run and 14 RBIs in 56 games. On September 30, 2014, Jones was released by the organization.

On October 8, 2014, Jones signed a minor league contract with the Miami Marlins organization. He was released prior to the season on March 31, 2015.

=== Gary SouthShore RailCats ===
Jones signed with the Gary SouthShore RailCats of the American Association of Independent Professional Baseball for the 2015 season. He hit a team-leading .314, tied for the team lead in home runs (5), and was second on the club with 40 RBIs.

=== New Britain Bees ===
On March 28, 2016, Jones was traded to the New Britain Bees of the Atlantic League of Professional Baseball for future considerations. In 72 games, he slashed .269/.307/.405 with 5 home runs, 33 RBIs, and 24 stolen bases. He became a free agent following the season.

=== Vaqueros Unión Laguna/Algodoneros de Unión Laguna ===
On June 15, 2017, Jones signed with the Vaqueros Unión Laguna of the Mexican League. In 72 games with the club, he slashed .245/.342/.412 with 8 home runs and 37 RBIs. He returned to the team, re-named the Algodoneros de Unión Laguna, for first half of the 2018 season.

=== Leones de Yucatán ===
On July 26, 2018, Jones was traded to the Leones de Yucatán of the Mexican League. He played in 29 games with the Leones to finish out the year, batting .222/.316/.394 with 2 home runs and 14 RBIs. Jones later stayed in Mexico to play for the Cañeros de Los Mochis of the Mexican Pacific League.

In 2019, Jones returned to Yucatán, setting career highs in hits (138), RBIs (55), and stolen bases (31) across 97 games played. He re-signed in 2020, but the season was later canceled due to the COVID-19 pandemic. Jones again re-signed with the Leones for the 2021 season. Appearing in just 18 games as a result of injuries and his Team Mexico commitments, he slashed .217/.294/.300 with 1 home run and 5 RBIs.

On November 3, 2021, Jones announced his retirement from professional baseball.

== International career ==
In 2019, Jones was selected to Team Mexico at the 2019 WBSC Premier12 competition. He is African-American, but of Mexican heritage on his mother's side and therefore eligible to represent Mexico. Playing in 8 games, Jones batted .385 (5th-best) and hit 3 home runs (tied for 1st). He was the only player from Team Mexico to be named to the All-World Team. Mexico finished the tournament with a victory in the bronze medal game over the United States, thereby qualifying for the 2020 Summer Olympics

Jones would be selected to the final roster for the Mexico national baseball team at the 2020 Summer Olympics.
