= Chang Yi (baseball) =

Taiwanese baseball player (born 1994)

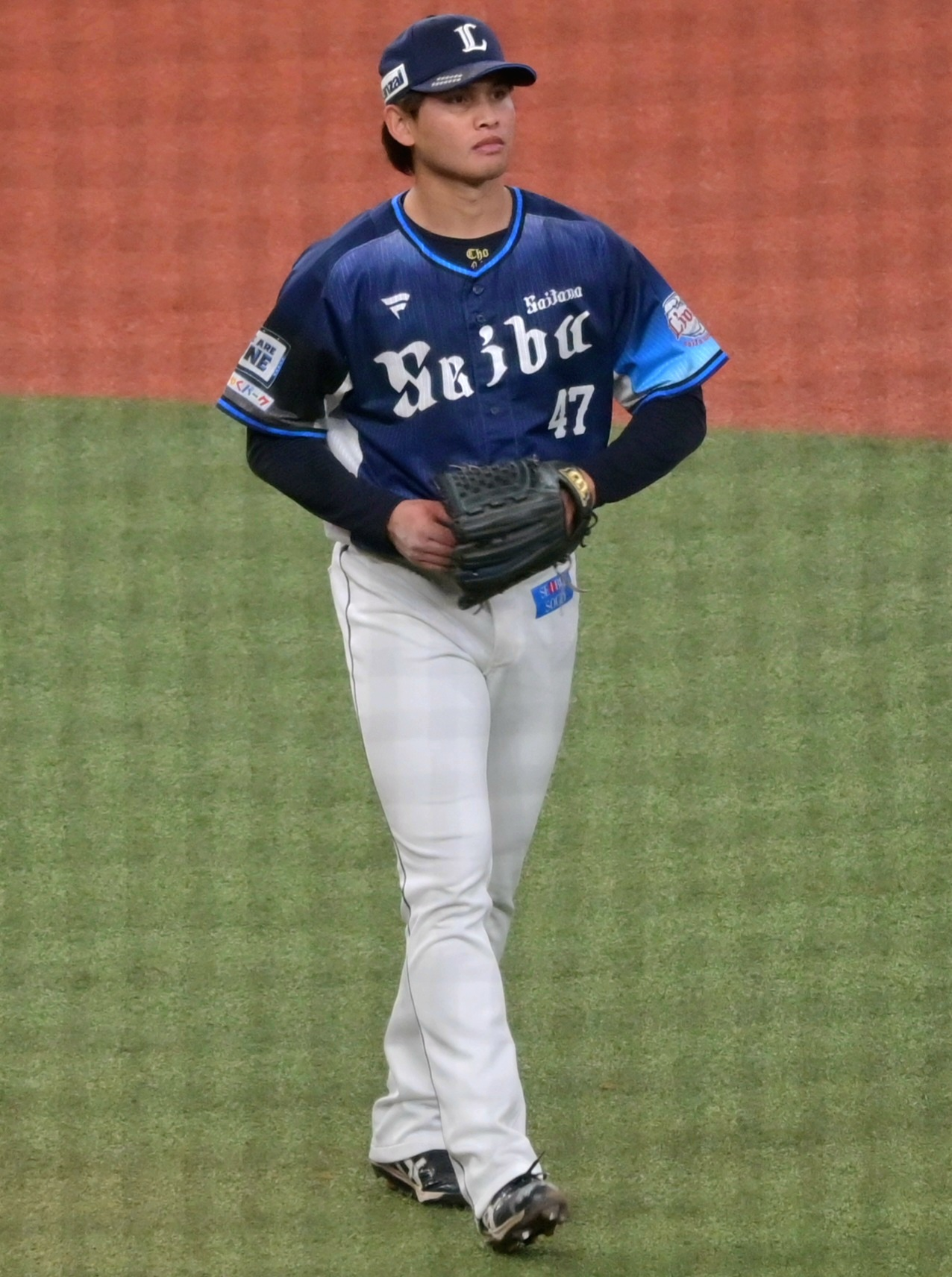
- Yi with the Saitama Seibu Lions in 2023

Fubon Guardians – No. 19
- Pitcher
- Born: February 26, 1994 (age 32); Wanrong, Hualien, Taiwan
- Bats: Right Throws: Right

Professional debut
- NPB: May 16, 2019, for the Orix Buffaloes
- CPBL: July 14, 2024, for the Fubon Guardians

NPB statistics (through 2023 season)
- Win–loss record: 4–9
- Earned run average: 5.32
- Strikeouts: 101

CPBL statistics (through 2025)
- Win–loss record: 6–12
- Earned run average: 5.03
- Strikeouts: 84
- Stats at Baseball Reference

Teams
- Orix Buffaloes (2019–2022); Saitama Seibu Lions (2023); Fubon Guardians (2024–present)
Medals
Men's baseball
Representing Chinese Taipei
WBSC Premier12
Gold medal – first place	2024	Team

Chang Yi (Chinese: 張奕; born February 26, 1994) is a Taiwanese professional baseball pitcher for the Fubon Guardians of the Chinese Professional Baseball League (CPBL). He has previously played in Nippon Professional Baseball (NPB) for the Orix Buffaloes and Saitama Seibu Lions. Chang is of Taiwanese indigenous descent; his father is ethnically Taroko and his mother is an ethnic Amis.

== Career ==
=== Nippon Professional Baseball ===
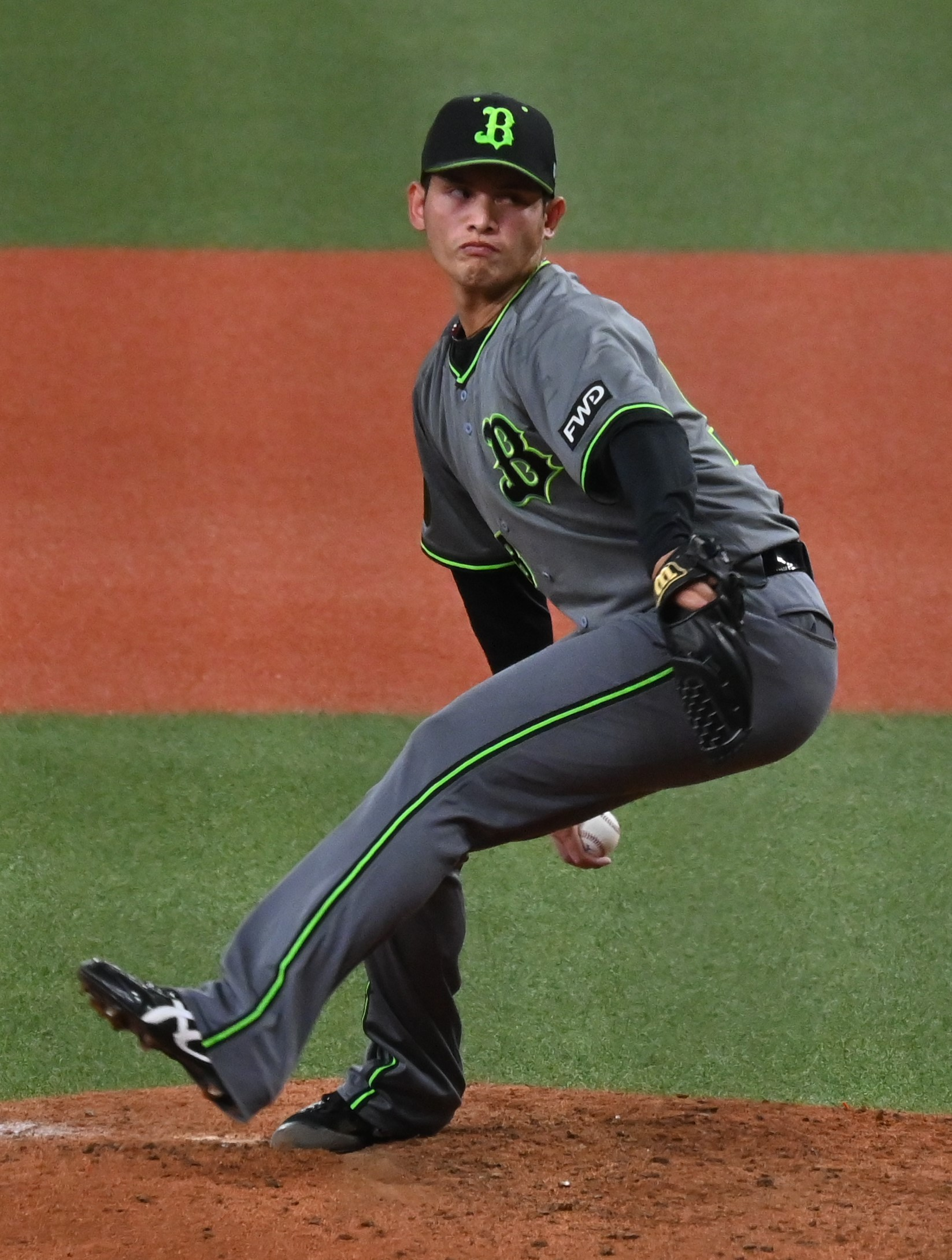
Yi with the Orix Buffaloes in 2021

On November 22, 2023, it was confirmed that Chang would leave NPB and pursue professional opportunities in his home country of Taiwan.

=== Chinese Professional Baseball League ===
==== Fubon Guardians ====
On June 28, 2024, Yi was selected by the Fubon Guardians with the team's second–round selection in the 2024 CPBL mid–season draft.

== International career ==
Chang played in the 2019 WBSC Premier12 for the Chinese Taipei national baseball team. He was selected to the national team roster for the 2023 World Baseball Classic, but withdrew from the competition following a diagnosis of shoulder bursitis.
