= Chen Chieh-hsien =

Taiwanese baseball player (born 1994)

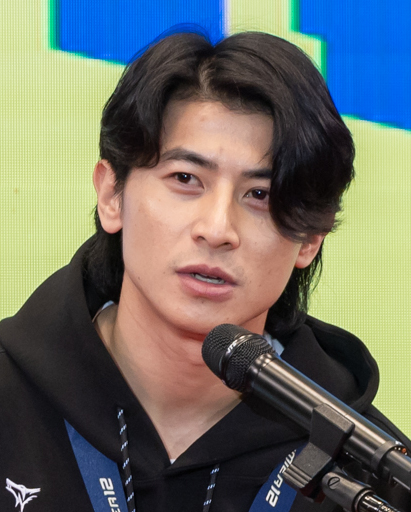
- Chen in 2024

Uni-President 7-Eleven Lions – No. 24
- Outfielder
- Born: January 7, 1994 (age 32); Kaohsiung, Taiwan
- Bats: Left Throws: Right

CPBL debut
- July 29, 2016, for the Uni-President 7-Eleven Lions

CPBL statistics (through May 4, 2026)
- Batting average: .337
- Home runs: 38
- Runs batted in: 423
- Stats at Baseball Reference

Teams
- Uni-President Lions (2016–)

Career highlights and awards
- CPBL: Taiwan Series champion (2020); CPBL batting champion (2020); 6× All-Star (2017–2018, 2022–2025); 4× CPBL Golden Glove Award (2022–2025); 2× CPBL Best shortstop (2017–2018); 3× CPBL Best outfielder (2022–2024); Chinese Taipei: 2024 WBSC Premier12 Most Valuable Player; 2024 WBSC Premier12 batting champion
Medals
Representing Chinese Taipei
Men's baseball
WBSC Premier12
Gold medal – first place	2024 Tokyo	Team
Asia Professional Baseball Championship
Bronze medal – third place	2023 Tokyo	Team
21U Baseball World Cup
Gold medal – first place	2014 Taichung	Team

Chen Chieh-hsien (Chinese: 陳傑憲; pinyin: Chén Jiéxiàn; born January 7, 1994) is a Taiwanese professional baseball outfielder and captain for the Uni-President 7-Eleven Lions of the Chinese Professional Baseball League (CPBL).

== Early life ==
Chen was born in Kaohsiung, Taiwan, on January 7, 1994. He has two elder brothers, Chen Hsin-kai (陳信凱; d. 2018) and Chen Chieh-lin (陳傑霖), and an older sister, Chen Pin-chun (陳品鈞). His father, Chen Chien-chang (陳建彰; d. 2021), was a baseball coach. His mother, Huang Shu-juan (黃淑娟; d. 2023), was the founder of a Kaohsiung charity.

As a child, Chen lived in Banqiao, Taipei, before moving back to Kaohsiung, where he joined a junior baseball team in elementary school. He attended Sanmin Senior High School before moving to Japan to attend Okayama Kyousei High School, where he was teammates with TSG Hawks player Nien-Ting Wu. Chen participated in the 2012 NPB draft, but went undrafted and returned to Taiwan to play for Taiwan Power in 2013.

== Career ==
=== Uni-President 7-Eleven Lions ===
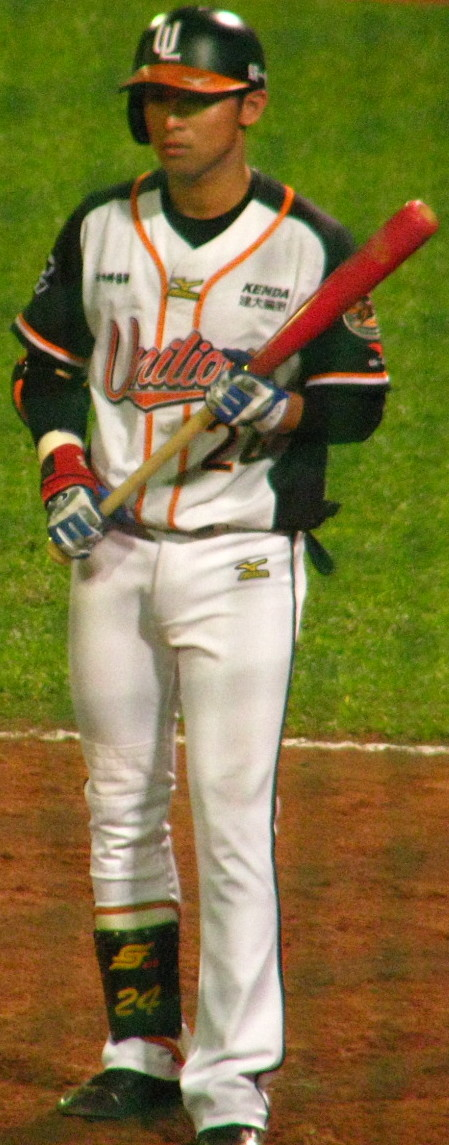
Chen with the Uni-President 7-Eleven Lions in 2017

On June 27, 2016, Chen was selected by the Uni-President 7-Eleven Lions in the second round of the 2016 CPBL Draft. On July 11, Chen signed with a signing bonus of NT$4.4 million and an incentive bonus of NT$1 million. On July 29, Chen was promoted to the first-team and made his professional debut as a pinch runner against the EDA Rhinos, where he stole a base. On August 3, Chen got his first hit: a double against Cheng Kai-wen of the CTBC Brothers. On August 7, Chen hit his first career home run off Orlando Román of the Lamigo Monkeys.

On June 15, 2017, Chen was selected to be the starting shortstop in the 2017 CPBL All-Star Game. On September 8, Chen struck out against the Fubon Guardians, ending his steak of 98 consecutive at-bats without a strikeout. On September 24, Chen broke the previous team record of most hits in a season, previously held by Kao Kuo-ching (157) by getting his 158th against the Monkeys.

On September 17, 2018, Chen committed his 30th error of the season, becoming the first player in 11 years to do so.

On April 20, 2019, Chen was hit by pitch and fractured his wrist, causing him to miss the season.

Chen started the season as a shortstop in 2020, but his 7 errors across 11 games caused confidence problems and affected his hitting performance. Chen switched to playing outfield, and was praised by media for his defensive contribution. Chen played a vital role in the Lions' performance in the 2020 Taiwan Series, where after trailing 1–3 in the series, Chen hit a go-ahead home run in Game 7, winning the 10th championship in franchise history. Chen finished the season as batting champion with a .360 batting average and 174 hits, and was awarded with a spot on the CPBL Best 10.

== International career ==
Chen played for Chinese Taipei at the 2014 21U Baseball World Cup, where he won gold.

Chen was selected to play for Chinese Taipei at the 2023 World Baseball Classic, where he had 5 hits and 2 RBIs in 14 at-bats across 4 games. Chinese Taipei were ultimately knocked out of the tournament at the group stages on runs scored.

On October 12, 2024, Chen was announced as the captain of Chinese Taipei for the 2024 WBSC Premier12. On November 13, Chen hit a two-run home run against Ko Young-pyo in a 6–3 win against South Korea. On November 24, in the championship game against Japan, Chen hit a three-run home run off Shosei Togo and helped Chinese Taipei win 4–0, ending Japan's 27-game win streak. Chen was awarded as the most valuable player of the game. Chen was named Most Valuable Player, Best Defensive Player, and Best Center Fielder of the tournament after going 15-for-24, having 2 home runs, a .625 batting average, and a 1.617 OPS.

Chen was selected as the captain for Chinese Taipei for the 2026 World Baseball Classic. However, he fractured his left index finger on a hit by pitch from Jack O'Loughlin in the Opening Game against Australia, ruling him out for the competition.

== Personal life ==
Chen's wife was a former cheerleader for the EDA Rhinos and the CTBC Brothers. They married in January 2021, and have two sons.

Chen mentioned that his idols are Jung-hoo Lee and Shohei Ohtani.
