= Kaito Kozono =

Japanese baseball player (born 2000)

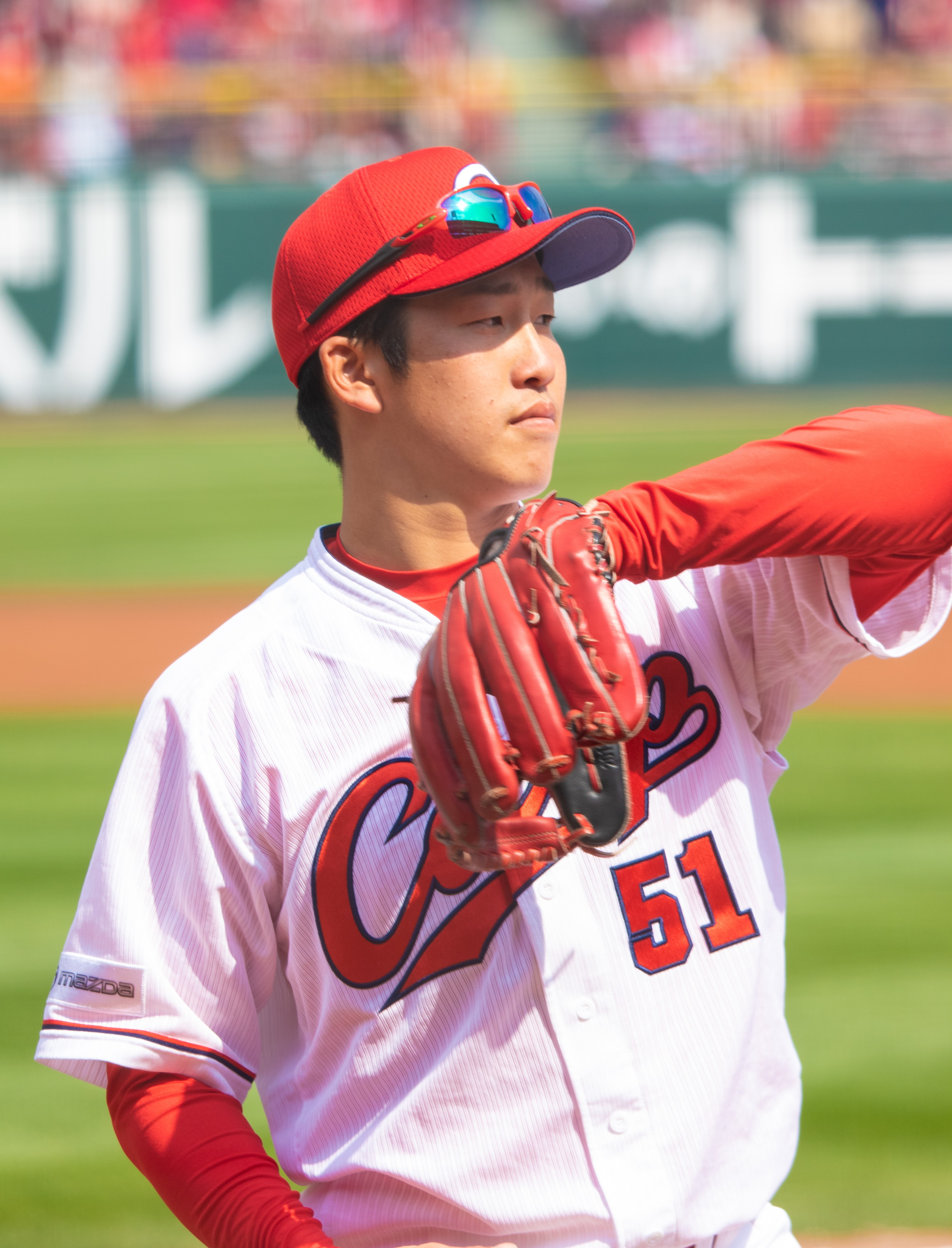

Hiroshima Toyo Carp – No. 5
- Infielder
- Born: June 7, 2000 (age 26); Takarazuka, Hyōgo, Japan
- Bats: Left Throws: Right

NPB debut
- July 20, 2019, for the Hiroshima Toyo Carp

Career statistics (through July 21, 2024)
- Batting average: .277
- Home runs: 23
- Runs batted in: 151
- Stats at Baseball Reference

Teams
- Hiroshima Toyo Carp (2019–present)

Career highlights and awards
- NPB: 2× NPB All-Star (2022, 2024); International: WBSC Premier12 All-World Team (2024)
Medals
Men's baseball
Representing Japan
WBSC Premier12
Silver medal – second place	2024	Team

Kaito Kozono (小園 海斗, Kozono Kaito; born July 7, 2000) is a Japanese professional baseball infielder for the Hiroshima Toyo Carp of Nippon Professional Baseball (NPB).
