= Japan national baseball team =

National sports team

Information
- Country: Japan
- Federation: Baseball Federation of Japan
- Confederation: WBSC Asia
- Manager: Tadahito Iguchi
- Captain: Shohei Ohtani
- Team Colors: Navy blue, White, Red, Gold

WBSC ranking
- Current: 1 (26 March 2026)
- Highest: 1 (8 times; latest in March 2026)
- Lowest: 3 (December 2012)

Uniforms
Home	Away

Olympic Games
- Appearances: 6 (first in 1992)
- Best result: (gold) 1st (1 time, in 2020)

World Baseball Classic
- Appearances: 6 (first in 2006)
- Best result: (gold) 1st (3 times, most recent in 2023)

WBSC Premier12
- Appearances: 3 (first in 2015)
- Best result: (gold) 1st (1 time, in 2019)

World Cup
- Appearances: 15 (first in 1972)
- Best result: (silver) 2nd (1 time, in 1982)

Intercontinental Cup
- Appearances: 15 (first in 1973)
- Best result: (gold) 1st (2 times, most recent in 1997)

Asian Games
- Appearances: 7 (first in 1994)
- Best result: (gold) 1st (1 time, in 1994)

Asian Championship
- Appearances: 25 (first in 1954)
- Best result: (gold) 1st (21 times, most recent in 2025)

The Japan national baseball team (野球日本代表, Yakyū Nippon Daihyō or Yakyū Nihon Daihyō), also known as Samurai Japan (侍ジャパン), is the national team representing Japan in international baseball competitions. It won the World Baseball Classic in 2006, 2009, and 2023, as well as the WBSC Premier12 in 2019. The team is currently ranked 1st in the world by the World Baseball Softball Confederation.

Japan is the only country to have participated in every edition Summer Olympic Games since it was first officially added to as a medal sport in 1992, through the last regular tournament at the 2008 Beijing Games and its return in 2020 Tokyo Games (the team also appeared in the demonstration tournaments of 1964, 1984, and 1988). Until 2000, the team was made up exclusively of amateur players. Since the 2000 Summer Olympics, the team has included players from Nippon Professional Baseball. The team that played in and won the 2006 World Baseball Classic included Japanese players from Major League Baseball as well. The team played in the Beijing Olympics in 2008, as it had qualified through the 2007 Asian Baseball Championship. Unlike the WBC roster, the Olympic team was composed exclusively of NPB players (though it included one amateur player, who was drafted during the tournament's progress). Japan participated in the 2017 World Baseball Classic, finishing third.

Samurai Japan won the 2019 WBSC Premier12 Tournament. At the 2020 Tokyo Olympics, it faced Israel, Mexico, South Korea, the United States, and the Dominican Republic, and won gold. At the 2023 World Baseball Classic, Japan defeated the defending champion United States to become the champions. Their 2023 win was their third World Baseball Classic championship, the most championships for any country.

Team Japan began the 2026 World Baseball Classic tournament's Pool C play on March 6, 2026, by defeating Chinese Taipei 13–0.

== Current roster ==
Japan – 2026 World Baseball Classic roster
Players		Coaches
Pitchers: 1 Yuki Matsui; 13 Hiroya Miyagi; 14 Hiromi Itoh; 15 Taisei Ota; 16 Shohei Ohtani; 17 Yusei Kikuchi; 18 Yoshinobu Yamamoto; 19 Tomoyuki Sugano; 26 Atsuki Taneichi; 28 Hiroto Takahashi; 47 Ryuhei Sotani; 57 Koki Kitayama; 61 Kaima Taira; 66 Yuki Matsumoto; 69 Daichi Ishii	Catchers: 4 Kenya Wakatsuki; 12 Seishirō Sakamoto; 27 Yuhei Nakamura; Infielders: 2 Shugo Maki; 3 Kaito Kozono; 5 Taisei Makihara; 6 Sosuke Genda; 7 Teruaki Sato; 25 Kazuma Okamoto; 55 Munetaka Murakami; Outfielders: 8 Kensuke Kondoh; 20 Ukyo Shuto; 23 Shota Morishita; 34 Masataka Yoshida; 51 Seiya Suzuki	Manager: 89 Hirokazu Ibata; Coaches: 79 Yoshiyuki Kamei; 88 Makoto Kaneko; 74 Yoshinori Murata; 77 Eishin Soyogi; 81 Kazuki Yoshimi; 84 Atsushi Nohmi; 71 Nobuhiro Matsuda

== Nickname ==
The team has been nicknamed "Samurai Japan" (侍ジャパン). Like other national teams in Japan, the nickname is usually prefixed with the surname of the manager. However, in the 2009 World Baseball Classic, the team used Samurai, a symbol of Japan's history, instead of Hara, the surname of their manager. In 2012, it was adopted officially.

== Regional competition ==
=== Asian Baseball Championship ===
Japan have dominated the Asian Baseball Championship since its inception, and have competed in every year. Japan have never missed out on placing in the top 3 in any tournament, and is the only team to have achieved this feat. Japan also holds the record for most consecutive Asian Championships, having won four times in a row on two occasions.

=== Asian Games ===
In all four Asian Games to include baseball, Japan have placed in the top 3 in every tournament, though they have only won the tournament once in the first event held in Hiroshima in 1994.

== International competition ==
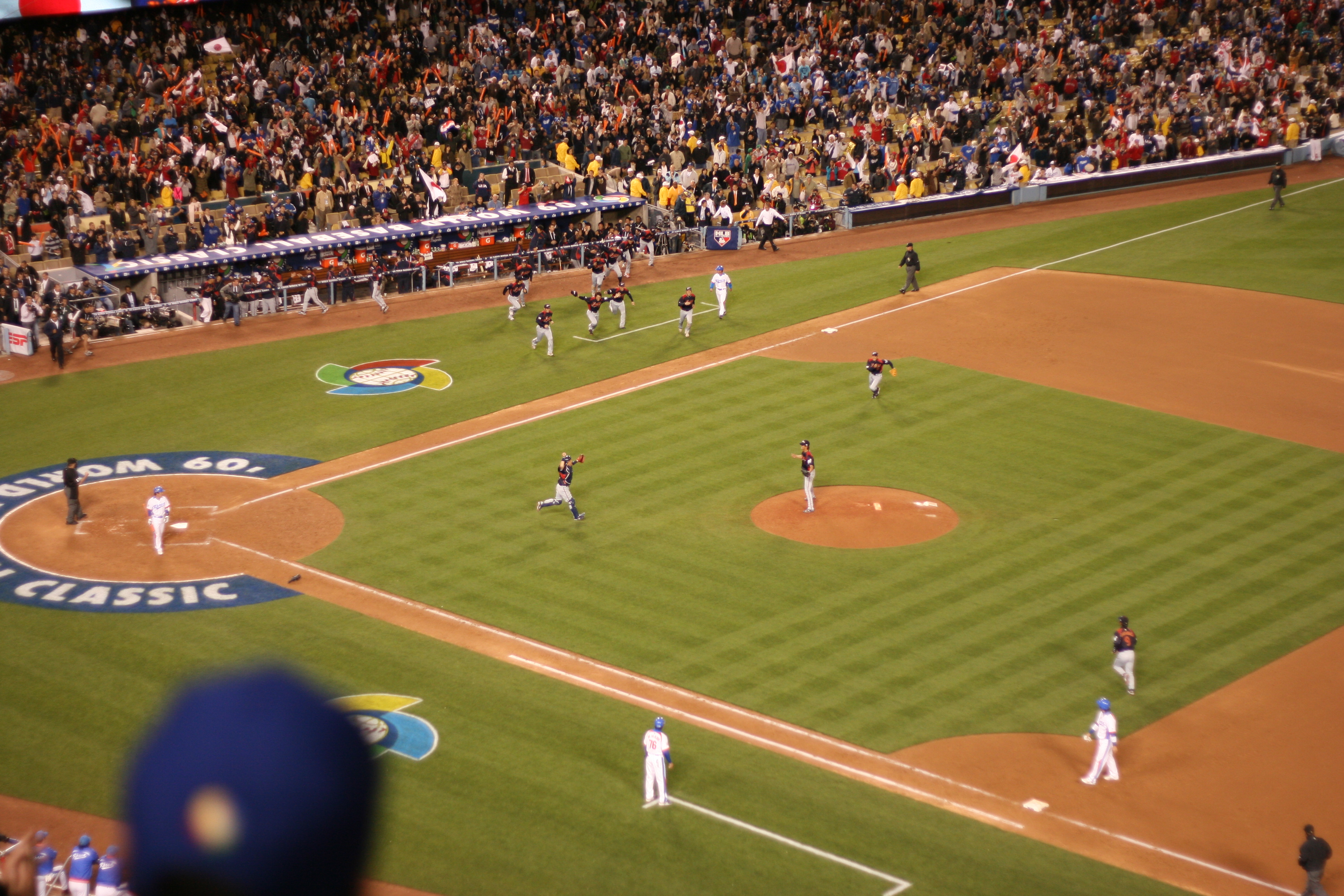
2009 World Baseball Classic finals. Kenji Johjima and Yu Darvish

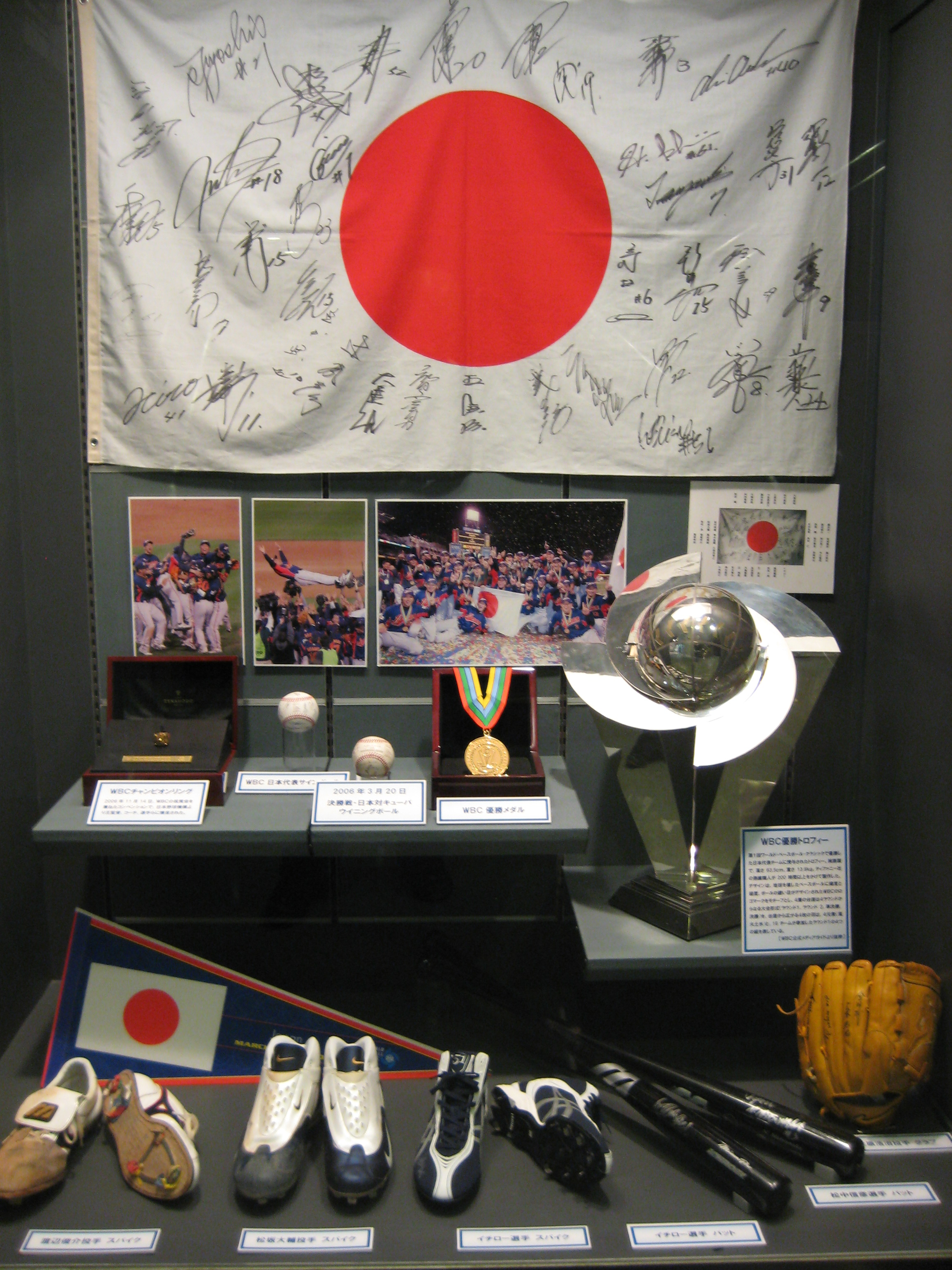
World Baseball Classic Championship Trophy

=== World Baseball Classic ===
==== 2006 ====
Japan won the inaugural 2006 World Baseball Classic, defeating Cuba in the Final.

==== 2009 ====
Japan also won the 2009 World Baseball Classic, hosting the Pool A games in the Tokyo Dome. Japan started the tournament opener with a 4–0 win over China. Japan then secured advancement into the second round with a 14–2 win in seven innings over arch-rival South Korea. The game was shortened due to the WBC's mercy rule. Japan then played South Korea again to determine seeding for the second round. In the rematch, the Koreans shut out Japan 1–0, making Japan advance as the Pool A runner-up. In Pool 1 of the WBC quarter-finals, Japan defeated Cuba 6–0, but lost to Korea again 4–1. In the elimination match that followed, Japan secured a spot in the semi-finals with a 5–0 win over Cuba. Japan defeated South Korea in the Finals 5–3 partly because of an Ichiro Suzuki base hit in the 10th inning.

==== 2013: The end of the championship streak ====
Japan, the two-time world defending champions, entered the 2013 World Baseball Classic, hosting Pool A games in the Fukuoka Dome, facing off against Cuba, China, and newcomers Brazil. Despite their first loss against the Cuban team, they secured their position for the second round in 2013 World Baseball Classic Pool 1 to face off the Netherlands and Chinese Taipei. The Japanese team narrowly won against Chinese Taipei 4–3, before proceeding to face off against the Dutch team, winning against them twice before proceeding to the semi-final round, along with the Netherlands, as they faced off against Puerto Rico. Despite Japan's efforts, they eventually lost 3–1 against the Puerto Rican team right after Alex Ríos scored two additional runs from a home run. Japan finished third in the 2013 WBC, as their two-time championship streak ended. The Japanese team bowed out to both the crowd and the Puerto Rican team as a gesture of respect.

==== 2017 ====
In the 2017 World Baseball Classic, Japan hosted Pool B games in the Tokyo Dome. They finished first round play with a 3–0 record and advanced to the second round. After batting .364, outfielder Yoshitomo Tsutsugoh was named the Pool B MVP. In the second round, Japan hosted Pool E games in the Tokyo Dome and again finished pool play with a 3–0 record, advancing to the championship round. However, Japan lost to the United States 2–1 in the semifinal. They finished the tournament in third place. Pitcher Kodai Senga was named to the All-World Baseball Classic Team.

==== 2023 ====
In the 2023 WBC, Japan again hosted Pool B games in the Tokyo Dome, going undefeated in four games with a 38–0 run differential. Shohei Ohtani was named the most valuable player of the pool. In the quarterfinals, Japan hosted Italy and won 9–3. According to the Nikkan Sports, 48 percent of all households in Japan watched the game, making it the most watched Samurai Japan game ever, beating the previous record set during the pool game against South Korea six days earlier.

After traveling to the Miami, Japan faced Mexico in the semifinal. Thanks to a home run robbery and double from Randy Arozarena, Mexico led 5–3 after the top of the eighth inning. Japan scored once in the bottom of the eighth, then two decisive runs in the bottom of the ninth on a double by Munetaka Murakami for a 6–5 win. In the championship, Japan beat the United States, with Ohtani striking out his then-MLB teammate Mike Trout to end the game. Ohtani was named the tournament MVP and the DH and a pitcher on the all-WBC team. Outfielder Masataka Yoshida was also selected to the all-WBC team.

=== Olympic Games ===
==== 2021 ====
Baseball was featured at the 2020 Summer Olympics, in Tokyo, for the first time since the 2008 Summer Olympics. Six national teams are competing in the tournament: Israel, Japan (host), Mexico, South Korea, the United States, and the Dominican Republic. It will be held from July 28 to August 7, 2021.

=== Premier12 Tournament ===
==== 2015 ====
Japan came in third in the 2015 WBSC Premier12 tournament.

==== 2019 ====
Japan won the 12-team 2019 WBSC Premier12 tournament, which was held from November 2 to 17, 2019.

==== 2024 ====
Japan hosted the 2024 WBSC Premier12 tournament, with some group stage games held at the Vantelin Dome Nagoya and the Super Round and medal games held in the Tokyo Dome. After going undefeated in all five Group B games and all three Super Round games, Japan lost in the championship game to Chinese Taipei, finishing second in the tournament. Three players made the All-World team, catcher Shōgo Sakakura, second baseman Kaito Kozono, and outfielder Shōta Morishita.

== Competitive record ==
=== World Baseball Classic ===
World Baseball Classic record								Qualification record			
Year	Result	Position	Pld	W	L	RS	RA	W	L	RS	RA
(Japan) (United States) 2006	Champions	1st	8	5	3	60	21	No qualifiers held			
(Japan) (United States) 2009	Champions	1st	9	7	2	50	16	No qualifiers held			
(Japan) (United States) 2013	Third Place	3rd	7	5	2	44	27	Automatically qualified			
(Japan) (United States) 2017	Third Place	3rd	7	6	1	47	24	Automatically qualified			
(Japan) (United States) 2023	Champions	1st	7	7	0	56	18	Automatically qualified			
(Japan) (United States) 2026	Quarterfinals	5th	5	4	1	39	17	Automatically qualified			
Total	3 Titles	6/6	43	34	9	296	123	—	—	—	—

==== Record by opponent ====
Japan World Baseball Classic record by opponent
Opponent	Tournaments met	W-L record	Largest victory		Largest defeat		Current streak
Opponent	Tournaments met	W-L record	Score	Tournament	Score	Tournament	Current streak
Australia	3	3–0	7–1	Japan 2023	–		W3
Brazil	1	1–0	5–3	Japan 2013	–		W1
China	5	5–0	18–2 (F/8)	Japan 2006	–		W5
Chinese Taipei	3	3–0	13–0 (F/7)	Japan 2026	–		W3
Cuba	4	5–1	6–0	United States 2009	6–3	Japan 2013	W2
Czech Republic	2	2–0	9–0	Japan 2026	–		W2
Israel	1	1–0	8–3	Japan 2017	–		W1
Italy	1	1–0	9–3	Japan 2023	–		W1
Mexico	2	2–0	6–1	United States 2006	–		W2
Netherlands	2	3–0	16–4 (F/7)	Japan 2013	–		W3
Puerto Rico	1	0–1	–		3–1	United States 2013	L1
South Korea	4	6–4	14–2 (F/7)	Japan 2009	4–1	United States 2009	W4
United States	4	2–2	9–4	United States 2009	4–3	United States 2006	W1
Venezuela	1	0–1	–		8–5	United States 2026	L1
Overall	6	34–9	Against CHN		Against VEN		L1
Overall	6	34–9	18–2 (F/8)	Japan 2006	8–5	United States 2026	L1

=== Olympic Games ===
Summer Olympics record							Qualification record
Year	Round	Position	W	L	RS	RA	Method
(Japan) 1964	Exhibition only		0	1	2	6	No qualifiers held
(United States) 1984	Finals	1st (Note: No medals awarded; tournament was a demonstration sport only)	4	1	33	11	Invited
(South Korea) 1988	Finals	2nd	4	1	27	17	1984 Summer Olympics
(Spain) 1992	Bronze medal	3rd	6	3	70	22	1991 Asian Baseball Championship
(United States) 1996	Silver medal	2nd	5	4	77	59	1995 Asian Baseball Championship
(Australia) 2000	Fourth Place	4th	4	5	42	29	1999 Asian Baseball Championship
(Greece) 2004	Bronze medal	3rd	7	2	60	23	2003 Asian Baseball Championship
(China) 2008	Fourth Place	4th	4	5	36	28	2007 Asian Baseball Championship
(Japan) 2020	Gold medal	1st	5	0	25	15	Qualified as hosts
Total (Note: Totals only include years 1992 to 2008 and 2020, during which baseball was an official medal sport.)	1 Title	6/6	31	19	310	176	

=== WBSC Premier 12 ===
WBSC Premier12 record
Year	Round	Position	Pld	W	L	%	RS	RA	Ranking
(Japan) (Taiwan) 2015	Third Place	(bronze) 3rd	8	7	1	.875	54	22	1st
(Japan) 2019	Champions	(gold) 1st	8	7	1	.875	52	24	1st
(Japan) (Taiwan) 2024	Runners-up	(silver) 2nd	9	8	1	.889	63	33	1st
2027	To be determined								
Total	1 Title	3/3	25	22	3	.880	169	79	

=== Baseball World Cup ===
- 1972 : 4th
- 1976 : (bronze) 3rd
- 1978 : 4th
- 1980 : (bronze) 3rd

- 1982 : (silver) 2nd
- 1984 : 4th
- 1986 : 5th
- 1988 : 4th
- 1990 : 5th
- 1994 : (bronze) 3rd

- 1998 : 5th
- 2001 : 4th
- 2003 : (bronze) 3rd
- 2005 : 5th
- 2007 : (bronze) 3rd
- 2009 : 10th
- 2011 : 12th

=== Intercontinental Cup ===
- 1973 : (gold) 1st
- 1975 : (silver) 2nd
- 1977 : (bronze) 3rd
- 1979 : (silver) 2nd
- 1981 : 6th
- 1985 : (bronze) 3rd

- 1987 : (bronze) 3rd
- 1989 : (silver) 2nd
- 1991 : (silver) 2nd
- 1993 : (bronze) 3rd
- 1995 : (silver) 2nd

- 1997 : (gold) 1st
- 1999 : (bronze) 3rd
- 2002 : 5th
- 2006 : 4th
- 2010 : 5th

=== Asian Baseball Championship ===
- 1954 : (silver) 2nd
- 1955 : (gold) 1st
- 1959 : (gold) 1st
- 1962 : (gold) 1st
- 1963 : (silver) 2nd
- 1965 : (gold) 1st
- 1967 : (gold) 1st
- 1969 : (gold) 1st
- 1971 : (silver) 2nd

- 1973 : (gold) 1st
- 1975 : (silver) 2nd
- 1983 : (silver) 2nd
- 1985 : (gold) 1st
- 1987 : (silver) 2nd
- 1989 : (silver) 2nd
- 1991 : (gold) 1st
- 1993 : (gold) 1st
- 1995 : (gold) 1st

- 1997 : (silver) 2nd
- 1999 : (silver) 2nd
- 2001 : (bronze) 3rd
- 2003 : (gold) 1st
- 2005 : (gold) 1st
- 2007 : (gold) 1st
- 2009 : (gold) 1st
- 2012 : (gold) 1st
- 2015 : (bronze) 3rd

- 2017 : (gold) 1st
- 2019 : (silver) 2nd
- 2023 : (gold) 1st

=== Far Eastern Championships ===
- 1913 : (gold) 1st
- 1915 : (silver) 2nd
- 1917 : (gold) 1st
- 1919 : (silver) 2nd
- 1921 : (silver) 2nd

- 1923 : (silver) 2nd
- 1925 : (silver) 2nd
- 1927 : (gold) 1st
- 1930 : (gold) 1st
- 1934 : (silver) 2nd

== See also ==
- Sports in Japan
- Baseball in Japan
- Japan national under-18 baseball team
- Japan women's national baseball team
- Japan–South Korea baseball rivalry
