= Haruto Inoue =

Japanese baseball player (born 2001)

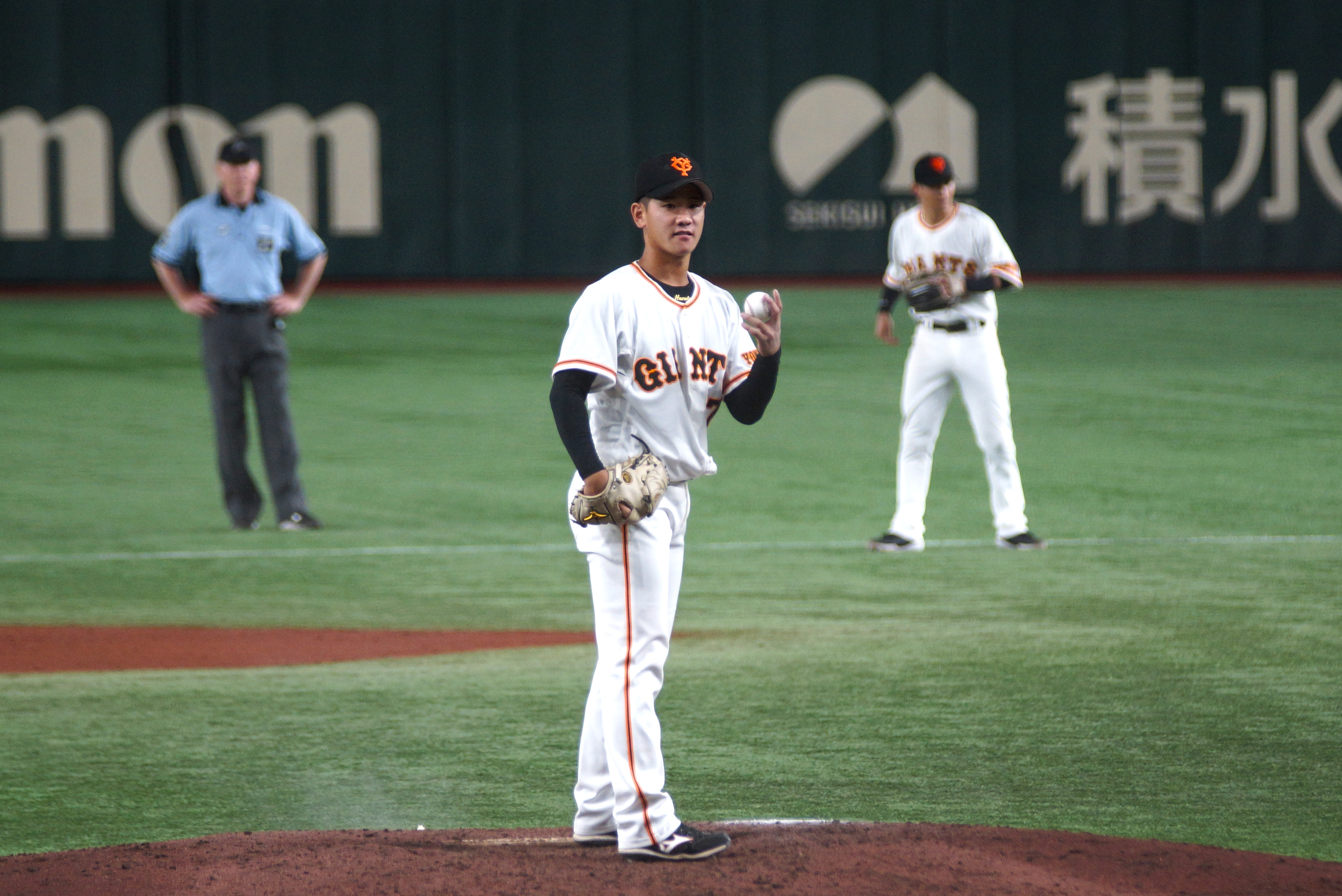
- Inoue with the Yomiuri Giants

Yomiuri Giants – No. 97
- Pitcher
- Born: May 13, 2001 (age 24); Maebashi, Gunma, Japan
- Bats: Left Throws: Left

NPB debut
- July 16, 2022, for the Yomiuri Giants

Career statistics (through 2024 season)
- Win–loss record: 9–7
- Earned run average: 4.06
- Strikeouts: 137

Teams
- Yomiuri Giants (2020–present)

Haruto Inoue (井上 温大, Inoue Haruto; born May 13, 2001, in Maebashi, Gunma, Japan) is a professional Japanese baseball player. He is a pitcher for the Yomiuri Giants of Nippon Professional Baseball (NPB).
