= 2019 WBSC Premier12 =

International baseball tournament

Tournament details
- Countries: Japan; Mexico; South Korea; Taiwan
- Dates: November 2–17
- Teams: 12
- Defending champions: South Korea

Final positions
- Champions: Japan (1st title)
- Runners-up: South Korea
- Third place: Mexico
- Fourth place: United States

Tournament statistics
- Games played: 32
- Attendance: 357,525 (11,173 per game)
- Best BA: (Japan) Seiya Suzuki (.478)
- Most HRs: Three tied (Note: Seiya Suzuki, Jonathan Jones and Brent Rooker) (3)
- Most SBs: (Japan) Ukyo Shuto (3)
- Best ERA: (Chinese Taipei) Yi Chang (Note: Chang had the most innings pitched among 19 pitchers who had a 0.00 ERA in the tournament.) (0.00)
- Most Ks (as pitcher): (South Korea) Hyeonjong Yang (17)

Awards
- MVP: (Japan) Seiya Suzuki

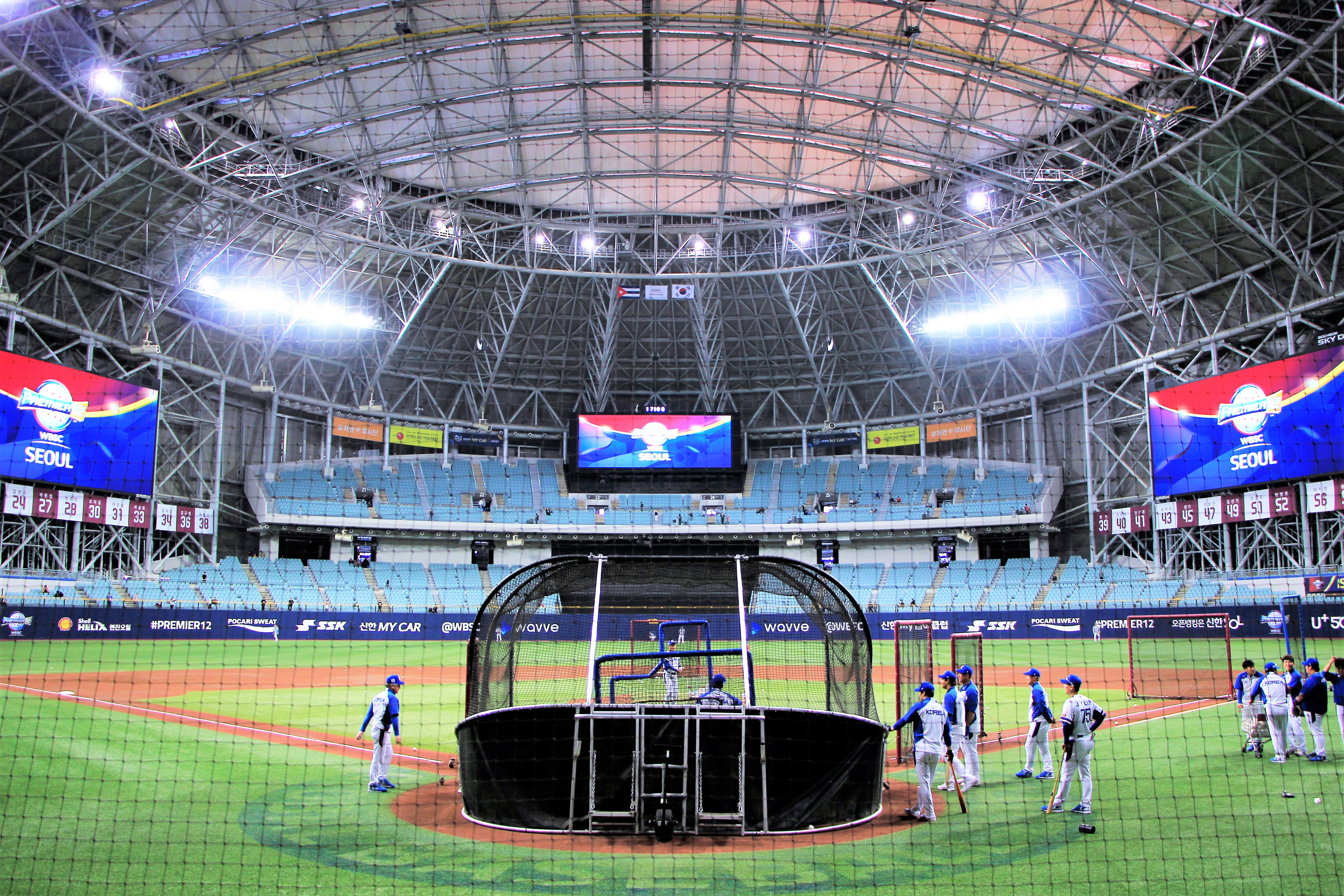
Gocheok Sky Dome inside WBSC Premier 12 2019

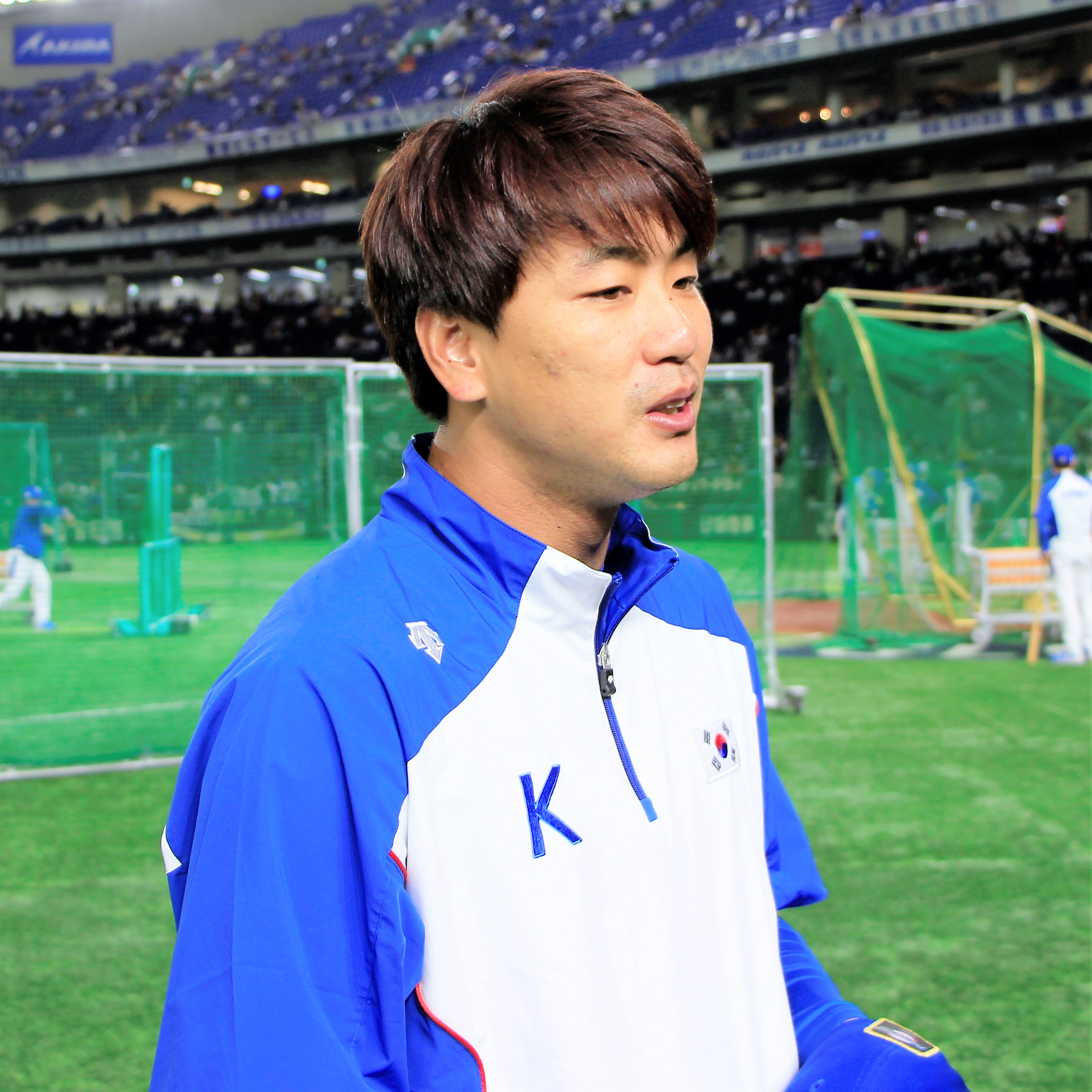
Kim Kwang-hyun 2019 Premier 12

The 2019 WBSC Premier12 was an international baseball championship featuring the 12 highest-ranked national teams in the world, held by the World Baseball Softball Confederation (WBSC). It was the second WBSC Premier12 event. The championship was held from November 2 to 17, 2019, in Mexico, South Korea, Taiwan, and Japan.

The tournament served as a qualifier for baseball at the 2020 Summer Olympics. Two quota spots were allocated, with Team Mexico as the top finisher from the Americas earning one spot, and Team South Korea as the top-finishing team from the Asia/Oceania region (excluding Team Japan, which already qualified as host) earning the other.

Japan defeated South Korea in the championship game, and the bronze medal game was won by Mexico over Team USA.

== Teams ==
Top 12 Rankings as of December 17, 2018
Rank	Team	Points	Confederation
1	Japan	5796	BFA
2	United States	5565	COPABE
3	South Korea	4987	BFA
4	Chinese Taipei	3569	BFA
5	Cuba	3516	COPABE
6	Mexico	3393	COPABE
7	Australia	2440	BCO
8	Netherlands	2421	CEB
9	Venezuela	2348	COPABE
10	Canada	2186	COPABE
11	Puerto Rico	2105	COPABE
12	Dominican Republic	1920	COPABE

The 12 highest-ranked national teams qualified to participate in the 2019 WBSC Premier12, based on the then-most-recent WBSC World Rankings, which were as of December 17, 2018.

== Format ==
=== Opening Round ===
The tournament began with three groups of four teams each playing in the 12-team Opening Round. Each team played three games, in a round robin format against the other three teams in its group.

=== Super Round ===
The top two teams from each group then advanced to the six-team Super Round, which was hosted at ZOZO Marine Stadium and the Tokyo Dome in Japan.

In the Super Round, the top two teams that advanced from each of the three groups competed in a round robin format against the top two teams that advanced from the other two groups, for a total of four games played per team.

=== Finals ===
Following the conclusion of the Super Round, four teams advanced to the Finals. The four teams were selected based on a combination of the results of the Opening Round game contested between the two teams in the same group that qualified for the Super Round (1 game) and the teams' results in the Super Round (4 games).

The 3rd- and 4th-place teams competed in a Bronze Medal Game, while the 1st- and 2nd-place teams faced each other in the Championship Final at the Tokyo Dome.

== Venues ==
Six stadiums were used during the tournament:

Group A	Group B	Group B
Zapopan, Mexico	Taichung, Taiwan	Taoyuan, Taiwan
Estadio de Béisbol Charros de Jalisco	Taichung Intercontinental Baseball Stadium	Taoyuan International Baseball Stadium
Capacity: 16,000	Capacity: 20,000	Capacity: 20,000

Group C	Super Round	Super Round and Finals
Seoul, South Korea	Chiba, Japan	Tokyo, Japan
Gocheok Sky Dome	ZOZO Marine Stadium	Tokyo Dome
Capacity: 16,813	Capacity: 30,000	Capacity: 46,000

== Opening round ==
=== Group A ===
Pos	Team	Pld	W	L	RF	RA	RD	PCT	GB	Qualification
1	Mexico (H)	3	3	0	24	5	+19	1.000	—	Advance to Super Round
2	United States	3	2	1	21	16	+5	.667	1	Advance to Super Round
3	Dominican Republic	3	1	2	23	20	+3	.333	2	
4	Netherlands	3	0	3	6	33	−27	.000	3	

(H) Hosts

Date	Local time	Road team	Score	Home team	Inn.	Venue	Game duration	Attendance	Boxscore
November 2	12:00	Netherlands	0 – 9	United States		Estadio Charros de Jalisco	2:17	3,015	
November 2	19:00	Dominican Republic	1 – 6	Mexico	6	Estadio Charros de Jalisco	2:00	8,000	
November 3	12:00	Dominican Republic	14 – 4	Netherlands	7	Estadio Charros de Jalisco	2:59	5,132	
November 3	19:00	Mexico	8 – 2	United States		Estadio Charros de Jalisco	3:03	10,123	
November 4	19:00	United States	10 – 8	Dominican Republic		Estadio Charros de Jalisco	3:20	3,102	
November 5	19:00	Netherlands	2 – 10	Mexico		Estadio Charros de Jalisco	3:17	6,895	

=== Group B ===
Pos	Team	Pld	W	L	RF	RA	RD	PCT	GB	Qualification
1	Japan	3	3	0	20	5	+15	1.000	—	Advance to Super Round
2	Chinese Taipei (H)	3	2	1	10	9	+1	.667	1	Advance to Super Round
3	Venezuela	3	1	2	11	12	−1	.333	2	
4	Puerto Rico	3	0	3	2	17	−15	.000	3	

(H) Hosts

Date	Local time	Road team	Score	Home team	Inn.	Venue	Game duration	Attendance	Boxscore
November 5	18:00	Venezuela	4 – 8	Japan		Taoyuan International Stadium	3:39	3,868	
November 5	18:30	Puerto Rico	1 – 6	Chinese Taipei		Taichung Intercontinental Stadium	2:58	11,852	
November 6	18:00	Puerto Rico	0 – 4	Japan		Taoyuan International Stadium	2:35	4,209	
November 6	18:30	Chinese Taipei	3 – 0	Venezuela		Taichung Intercontinental Stadium	3:56	10,983	
November 7	12:00	Venezuela	7 – 1	Puerto Rico		Taichung Intercontinental Stadium	2:48	618	
November 7	18:30	Japan	8 – 1	Chinese Taipei		Taichung Intercontinental Stadium	3:37	20,465	

=== Group C ===
Pos	Team	Pld	W	L	RF	RA	RD	PCT	GB	Qualification
1	South Korea (H)	3	3	0	15	1	+14	1.000	—	Advance to Super Round
2	Australia	3	1	2	5	9	−4	.333 (Note: HTH 1–1, Australia 0.067 TQB, Canada, 0.046 TQB, Cuba –0.105 TQB)	2	Advance to Super Round
3	Canada	3	1	2	5	6	−1	.333	2	
4	Cuba	3	1	2	3	12	−9	.333	2	

(H) Hosts
Notes:

Date	Local time	Road team	Score	Home team	Inn.	Venue	Game duration	Attendance	Boxscore
November 6	12:00	Canada	3 – 0	Cuba		Gocheok Sky Dome	3:16	250	
November 6	19:00	Australia	0 – 5	South Korea		Gocheok Sky Dome	2:50	5,899	
November 7	12:00	Australia	2 – 3	Cuba	10	Gocheok Sky Dome	3:15	252	
November 7	19:00	South Korea	3 – 1	Canada		Gocheok Sky Dome	3:15	6,000	
November 8	12:00	Canada	1 – 3	Australia		Gocheok Sky Dome	2:50	200	
November 8	19:00	Cuba	0 – 7	South Korea		Gocheok Sky Dome	3:05	13,600	

== Super Round ==
Pos	Team	Pld	W	L	RF	RA	RD	PCT	GB	Qualification
1	Japan (H)	5	4	1	27	16	+11	.800	—	Advance to gold medal game
2	South Korea	5	3	2	25	21	+4	.600 (Note: South Korea defeated Mexico 7–3.)	1	Advance to gold medal game
3	Mexico	5	3	2	17	12	+5	.600	1	Advance to bronze medal game
4	United States	5	2	3	11	20	−9	.400 (Note: United States defeated Chinese Taipei 3–2.)	2	Advance to bronze medal game
5	Chinese Taipei	5	2	3	15	14	+1	.400	2	
6	Australia	5	1	4	5	17	−12	.200	3	

(H) Hosts
Notes:

Date	Local time	Road team	Score	Home team	Inn.	Venue	Game duration	Attendance	Boxscore
November 11	12:00	Chinese Taipei	0 – 2	Mexico		Zozo Marine Stadium	2:49	2,803	
November 11	19:00	Australia	2 – 3	Japan		Zozo Marine Stadium	2:39	17,819	
November 11	19:00	United States	1 – 5	South Korea		Tokyo Dome	3:21	3,012	
November 12	12:00	Australia	0 – 3	Mexico		Tokyo Dome	2:36	2,089	
November 12	19:00	Chinese Taipei	7 – 0	South Korea		Zozo Marine Stadium	3:32	4,056	
November 12	19:00	United States	4 – 3	Japan		Tokyo Dome	3:27	27,827	
November 13	12:00	Australia	2 – 1	United States		Tokyo Dome	2:45	2,149	
November 13	19:00	Mexico	1 – 3	Japan		Tokyo Dome	3:01	31,776	
November 15	12:00	Chinese Taipei	2 – 3	United States		Tokyo Dome	2:37	4,967	
November 15	19:00	Mexico	3 – 7	South Korea		Tokyo Dome	3:34	5,121	
November 16	12:00	Australia	1 – 5	Chinese Taipei		Tokyo Dome	2:57	7,299	
November 16	19:00	South Korea	8 – 10	Japan		Tokyo Dome	3:40	44,224	

== Finals ==
=== Bronze medal game ===
Date	Local time	Road team	Score	Home team	Inn.	Venue	Game duration	Attendance	Boxscore
November 17	12:00	United States	2 – 3	Mexico	10	Tokyo Dome	3:15	44,960	

=== Championship final ===
Date	Local time	Road team	Score	Home team	Inn.	Venue	Game duration	Attendance	Boxscore
November 17	19:00	South Korea	3 – 5	Japan		Tokyo Dome	3:00	44,960	

== Final standings ==
Rk	Team	W	L
1	Japan	7	1
2	South Korea	5	3
bronze medal game
3	Mexico	6	2
4	United States	4	4
Eliminated in Super Round
5	Chinese Taipei	4	3
6	Australia	2	5
Eliminated in Group stage
7	Canada	1	2
7	Dominican Republic	1	2
7	Venezuela	1	2
10	Cuba	1	2
10	Netherlands	0	3
10	Puerto Rico	0	3

2019 WBSC Premier 12

Japan
1st title

== Awards ==
Following the conclusion of the tournament, the WBSC announced the Premier12 All-World Team and individual awards winners.

All-World Team
Position	Player
Starting Pitcher	(Chinese Taipei) Chang Yi
Relief Pitcher	(United States) Brandon Dickson
Catcher	(United States) Erik Kratz
First Baseman	(United States) Bobby Dalbec
Second Baseman	(Japan) Ryosuke Kikuchi
Third Baseman	(Chinese Taipei) Wang Wei-chen
Shortstop	(South Korea) Kim Ha-seong
Outfielders	(South Korea) Lee Jung-hoo (Mexico) Jonathan Jones (Japan) Seiya Suzuki
Designated Hitter	(United States) Brent Rooker

Individual Awards
Award	Player
Most Valuable Player	(Japan) Seiya Suzuki
Outstanding Defensive Player	(Japan) Ryosuke Kikuchi

== Prize money ==
The WBSC gave $5.2 million in prize money to participants, distributed as follows, with a minimum of half of a team's prize money to be distributed equally among its players:

- Winner: US$1,500,000 (Japan)
- 2nd Place: US$750,000 (South Korea)
- 3rd Place: US$500,000 (Mexico)
- 4th Place: US$350,000 (United States)
- 5th Place: US$300,000 (Chinese Taipei)
- 6th Place: US$250,000 (Australia)
- 7–12th Place: US$180,000 each
- Each win in Opening Round: US$10,000
- Each win in Super Round: US$20,000
- 1st Place in Opening Round: US$20,000

== Controversies ==
In the Super Round game between South Korea and the United States on November 11, which South Korea won 5–1, a potential blown call by umpire Tetsuya Shibata against South Korea became a topic of debate. In the third inning, baserunner Kim Ha-seong slid back to home plate as catcher Erik Kratz attempted to tag him out. Tetsuya ruled Kim out. Team Korea's coach, Kim Kyung-moon immediately requested a VAR check but was refused. After reviewing slow motion replays online, some criticized the call, claiming it was wrong and that South Korea lost a run. The Korea Baseball Organization met after the game with the tournament's technical directors and filed an appeal, additionally stating that Kratz physically obstructed Kim's path to home plate, in violation of WBSC playing regulations. WBSC responded by saying that it respected Team Korea's perspective and would seek to make improvements in the future. Korean media reports claimed that the Japanese media kept this incident quiet and many ridiculed the controversy in Japan, due to anti-Korean sentiment in the country.

== See also ==
- List of sporting events in Taiwan
