= WBSC Premier12 =

World baseball tournament

- Current season, competition or edition: 2024 WBSC Premier12
- Sport: Baseball
- Founded: November 2015
- Founder: World Baseball Softball Confederation (WBSC)
- No. of teams: 12
- Continent: International
- Most recent champion: Chinese Taipei (1st title)
- Most titles: Chinese Taipei (1 title); Japan (1 title); South Korea (1 title)

The WBSC Premier12 is the international baseball tournament organized by the World Baseball Softball Confederation (WBSC), featuring the 12 highest-ranked national baseball teams in the world. The first tournament was held by Taiwan and Japan in November 2015. The second tournament, 2019 WBSC Premier12, was held in November 2019, and served as a qualifier for two teams for baseball at the 2020 Summer Olympics.

== Overview ==
From 1938 to 2011, the International Baseball Federation (IBAF), then the governing body of baseball, considered the Baseball World Cup to be the sport's major world championship. Following the 2011 version of the event, the IBAF chose to discontinue the tournament in favor of the World Baseball Classic.

In 2005, the International Olympic Committee (IOC) announced that baseball and softball would be removed from the Summer Olympics permanent program, beginning in 2012. Thereafter, the IOC also officially reclassified baseball and softball as two different disciplines of the same sport. In 2013, the IBAF merged with the International Softball Federation to create the World Baseball Softball Confederation (WBSC).

In July 2014, the WBSC announced the creation of the Premier12 tournament, calling it the "new flagship men’s National Team baseball event," which would be held every four years. It was viewed as an event to fill in the calendar in place of the Baseball World Cup, since the World Baseball Classic took its place and an attempt to boost baseball's bid for inclusion in the 2020 Summer Olympics in Tokyo. The WBSC proposed that, if baseball did return to the Olympics for 2020, the 2019 WBSC Premier12 be used as a qualifying tournament.

On 11 September 2023, the WBSC officially announced the third staging of the tournament for 2024, to be hosted in Japan, Taiwan and a venue in the Americas, later chosen to be Mexico. In October 2024, the WBSC announced that the tournament will expand to 16 teams beginning in 2027.

== Status and popularity ==
With the World Baseball Classic acting as the biggest international baseball competition, the Premier12 is often viewed as the second or third most important tournament of the sport, behind the WBC, and, sometimes, the Summer Olympics.

In terms of viewership and popularity, the tournament tends to struggle especially in North and Central American countries. This is because a large portion of their talent pool is not permitted to play in the Premier12. As of 2024, all players active on a Major League Baseball roster are ineligible to participate in the Premier12.

However, the tournament still garners attention and media spotlight in countries in East Asia with active domestic baseball leagues, such as Japan, South Korea, and Taiwan, reflected by their large TV viewership.

When the Chinese Taipei national baseball team won the tournament in 2024, street parades were held to celebrate the team’s victory, with the sitting Taiwan president Lai Ching-te greeting the winner team.

== Participants ==
The field of the tournament consists of the 12 best national teams in the world according to the most recent WBSC World Rankings.

Across all editions of the tournament, 15 teams have qualified for at least one edition, with 10 of those teams having qualified for all four events. Of all the qualified teams, the majority have been from the Americas and Asia, and none have qualified from Africa. At least one team from Europe has qualified for every tournament, and Oceania has had one team (Australia) qualify for the last two tournaments.

Team	Appearances		
Team	Total	First	Latest
Chinese Taipei	4	2015	2027
Cuba	4	2015	2027
Dominican Republic	4	2015	2027
Japan	4	2015	2027
Mexico	4	2015	2027
Netherlands	4	2015	2027
Puerto Rico	4	2015	2027
South Korea	4	2015	2027
United States	4	2015	2027
Venezuela	4	2015	2027
Australia	3	2019	2027
Canada	2	2015	2019
Italy	2	2015	2027
Panama	2	2024	2027
Spain	1	2027	2027

== Results ==
Ed.	Year	Hosts	Final			Third place game		
Ed.	Year	Hosts	Champions	Score	Runners-up	Third place	Score	Fourth place
1	2015; Details	Japan; Taiwan	South Korea	8–0; Tokyo Dome, Tokyo	United States	Japan	11–1 (F/7); Tokyo Dome, Tokyo	Mexico
2	2019; Details	Japan; Mexico; South Korea; Taiwan	Japan	5–3; Tokyo Dome, Tokyo	South Korea	Mexico	3–2 (F/10); Tokyo Dome, Tokyo	United States
3	2024; Details	Japan; Mexico; Taiwan	Chinese Taipei	4–0; Tokyo Dome, Tokyo	Japan	United States	6–1; Tokyo Dome, Tokyo	Venezuela
4	2027; Details	Japan; Taiwan						

=== Performance of nations ===
Team	2015 (12)	2019 (12)	2024 (12)	2027 (16)	Total
Australia	×	QF; 6th	R1; 7th	Q	3
Canada	QF; 5th	R1; 7th	×	×	2
China	×	×	×		0
Chinese Taipei	R1; 9th	QF; 5th	1st	Q	4
Colombia	×	×	×	•	0
Cuba	QF; 6th	R1; 10th	R1; 11th	Q	4
Czech Republic	×	×	×		0
Dominican Republic	R1; 11th	R1; 8th	R1; 9th	Q	4
Germany	×	×	×	•	0
Great Britain	×	×	×		0
Italy	R1; 12th	×	×	Q	1
Japan	3rd	1st	2nd	Q	4
Mexico	4th	3rd	R1; 8th	Q	4
Netherlands	QF; 7th	R1; 11th	R1; 10th	Q	4
Nicaragua	×	×	×		0
Panama	×	×	R1; 6th	Q	2
Puerto Rico	QF; 8th	R1; 12th	R1; 12th	Q	4
Spain	×	×	×	Q	0
South Korea	1st	2nd	R1; 5th	Q	4
United States	2nd	4th	3rd	Q	4
Venezuela	R1; 10th	R1; 9th	4th	Q	4
Team	2015 (12)	2019 (12)	2024 (12)	2027 (16)	Total

Legend

- 1st – Champions
- 2nd – Runners-up
- 3rd – Third place
- 4th – Fourth place
- Q – Qualified
- • – Did not qualify
- × – Did not enter
- R1 – Round 1 (2015–2024: pool stage; 2027: opening round)
- QF – Quarterfinals (2015: playoff stage; 2019: super round; 2024: no quarterfinal; 2027: second round)

== Medal table ==
The countries which have participated in the WBSC Premier12 and their highest standing in the tournament as of 2026. Champions Runners-up Third place Fourth place Quarterfinals Round 1 Qualifiers

Rank	Nation	Gold	Silver	Bronze	Total
1	Japan	1	1	1	3
2	South Korea	1	1	0	2
3	Chinese Taipei	1	0	0	1
4	United States	0	1	1	2
5	Mexico	0	0	1	1
Totals (5 entries)		3	3	3	9

== Individual honors ==
=== Most Valuable Player ===
Year	Player	Position	Ref.
2015	(South Korea) Kim Hyun-soo	Outfielder	
2019	(Japan) Seiya Suzuki	Outfielder	
2024	(Chinese Taipei) Chieh-Hsien Chen	Outfielder	

== Theme music ==
- Heroic Charge (Bryce Jacobs)

== See also ==
- Baseball awards § World
- World Baseball Classic
- Women's Baseball World Cup
- Women's Softball World Cup
- Baseball at the Summer Olympics
