= 2023 World Baseball Classic knockout stage =

Tournament details
- Countries: Japan; United States
- Venues: Tokyo Dome; LoanDepot Park
- Dates: March 15–21
- Teams: 8

The 2023 World Baseball Classic knockout stage was a single-elimination tournament of the 2023 World Baseball Classic took place from March 15–21. The top two teams from each pool automatically qualify for the top eight knockout stage, beginning with the quarterfinals at the Tokyo Dome in Tokyo, Japan, and LoanDepot Park in Miami, Florida. The semifinals and final took place in Miami. Japan was the champion of this tournament

== Format ==
The top two teams from each pool advanced to the single elimination bracket. These games contested from March 15–21. Tokyo hosted two of the quarterfinals at the Tokyo Dome, while the other two quarterfinals, the semifinals, and the championship game took place at LoanDepot Park in Miami, Florida.

During the quarterfinal round, the four first-round pool winners were the designated home teams against the four runners-up. For the semifinals and championship game, the team with the better overall record was the designated home team; if two opposing teams have the same record, home team designation was determined by coin flip.

== Qualified teams ==
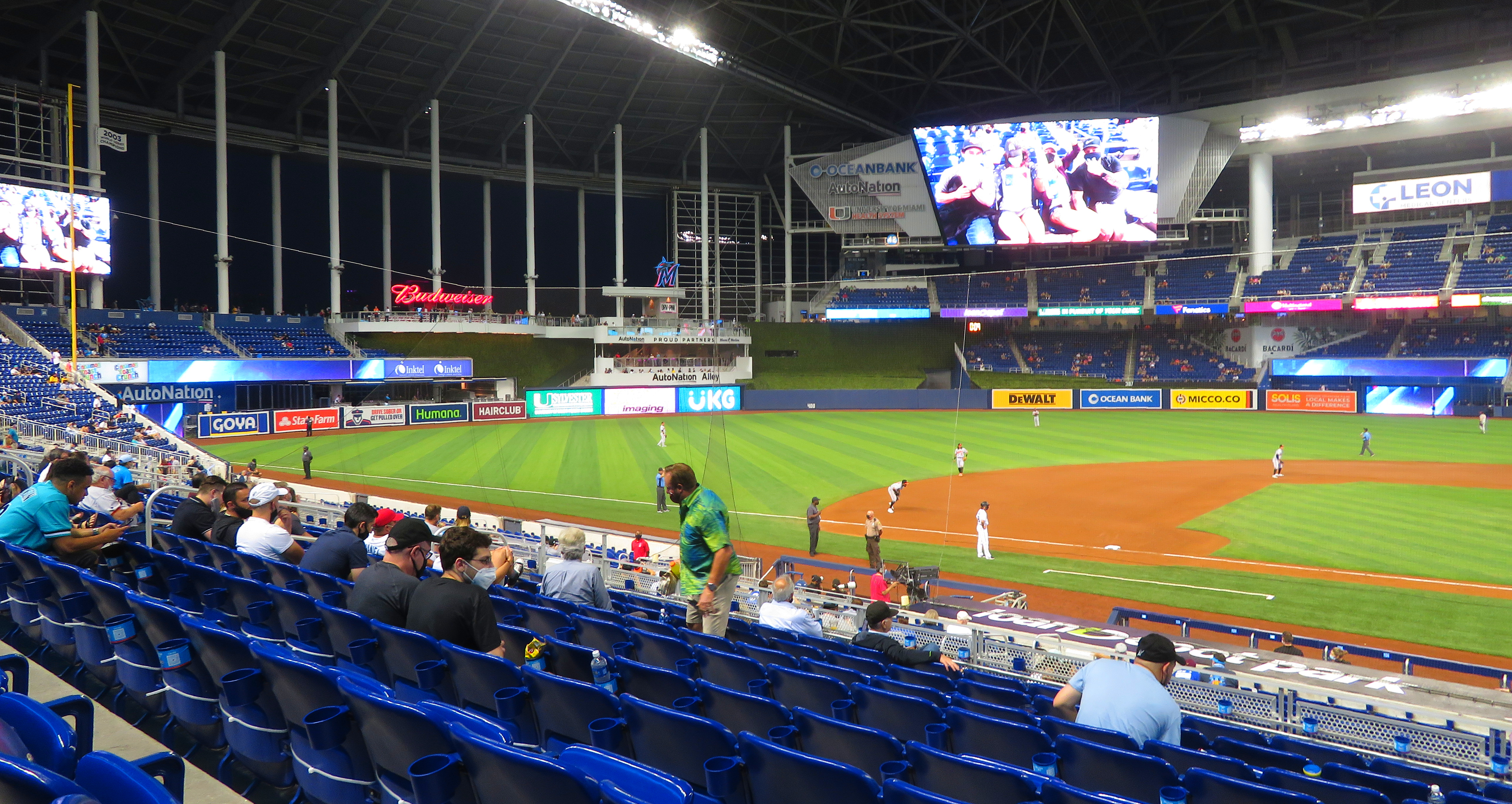
LoanDepot Park

Pool	Winners	Runners-up
A	Cuba	Italy
B	Japan	Australia
C	Mexico	United States
D	Venezuela	Puerto Rico

== Bracket ==
Quarterfinals
March 15 – Tokyo
Australia	3
Cuba	4
March 18 – Miami
United States	9
Venezuela	7
March 17 – Miami
Puerto Rico	4
Mexico	5
March 16 – Tokyo
Italy	3
Japan	9

Semifinals
March 19 – Miami
Cuba	2
United States	14
March 20 – Miami
Mexico	5
Japan	6

Championship
March 21 – Miami
United States	2
Japan	3

== Quarterfinals ==
Date	Local time	Road team	Score	Home team	Inn.	Venue	Game duration	Attendance	Boxscore
Mar 15, 2023	19:00 JST	Australia	3–4	Cuba		Tokyo Dome	3:24	35,061	Boxscore
Mar 16, 2023	19:00 JST	Italy	3–9	Japan		Tokyo Dome	3:24	41,723	Boxscore
Mar 17, 2023	19:00 EDT	Puerto Rico	4–5	Mexico		LoanDepot Park	3:17	35,817	Boxscore
Mar 18, 2023	19:00 EDT	United States	9–7	Venezuela		LoanDepot Park	3:46	35,792	Boxscore

=== Australia vs Cuba ===
March 15, 2023 19:00 JST at Tokyo Dome in Tokyo, Japan
Team	1	2	3	4	5	6	7	8	9	R	H	E
Australia	0	1	0	0	0	2	0	0	0	3	5	0
Cuba	0	0	1	0	3	0	0	0	x	4	7	1
WP: Miguel Romero (2–0) LP: Josh Guyer (0–1) Sv: Raidel Martínez (1); Home runs: AUS: Rixon Wingrove (1); CUB: None; Attendance: 35,061; Umpires: HP – Adam Hamari, 1B – Cuti Suárez, 2B – Laz Díaz, 3B – Delfin Colon; Boxscore

The knockout stage opener in Tokyo marked Australia's first ever quarterfinal game. Previously, the team had never advanced past pool play. The Australians scored first in the top of the second inning when Rixon Wingrove singled in Darryl George. Cuba tied the game in the third on a Luis Robert Jr. groundout. Cuba broke the tie in the bottom of the fifth, scoring three runs: one off an Alfredo Despaigne sac fly, and two off a Yoelkis Guibert single. Australia cut the lead to one when Wingrove hit a two-run home run, which proved to be the final runs of the game. Raidel Martínez earned the save for Cuba, sending the team to the semifinals for the first time since 2006.

=== Italy vs Japan ===
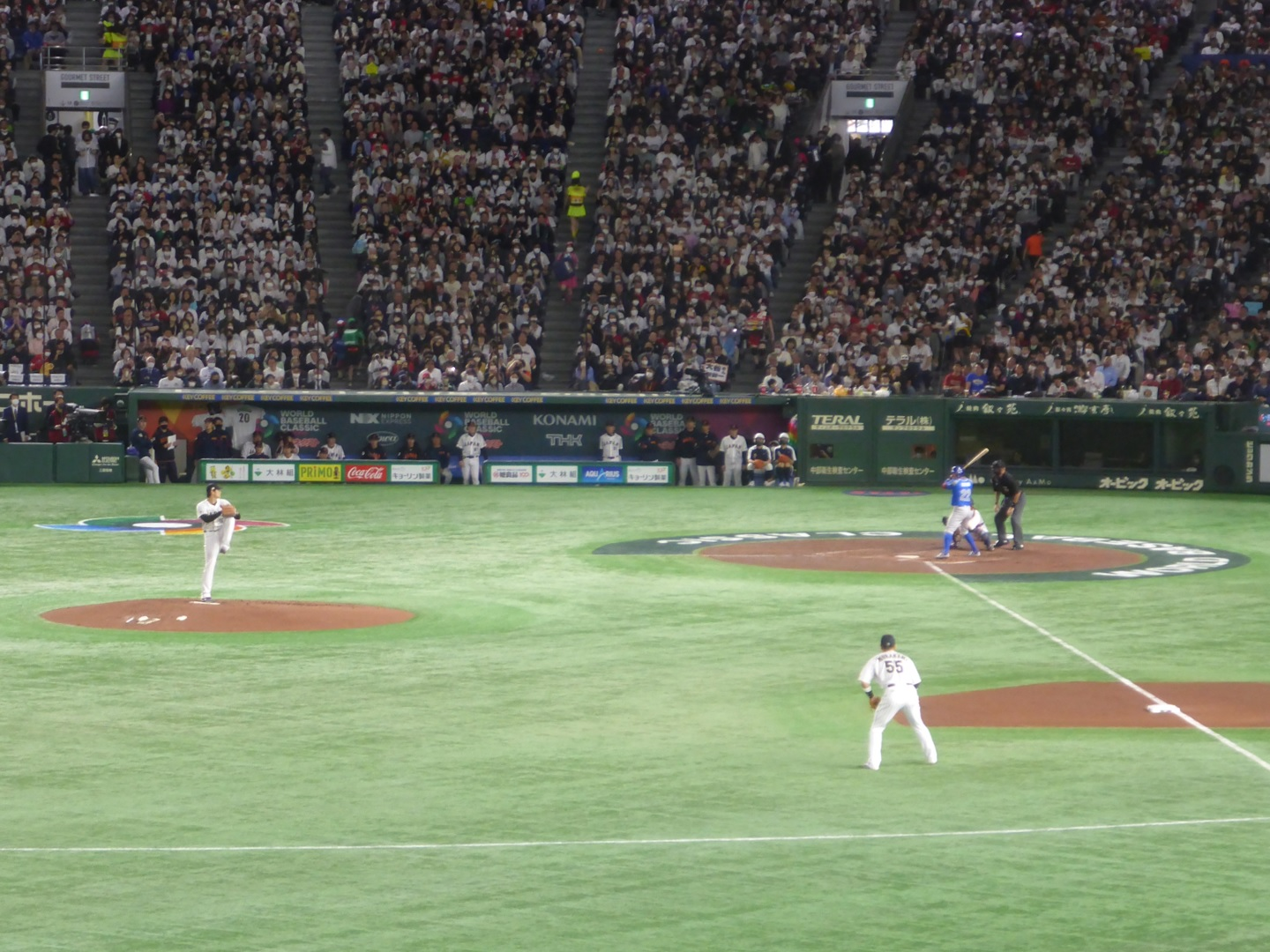
Italy vs Japan with over 40,000 spectators at Tokyo Dome on March 16, 2023

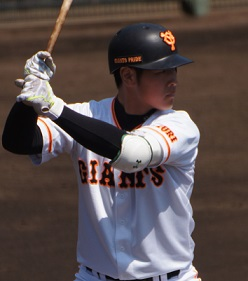
Kazuma Okamoto had five RBIs in the game, including a three-run home run.

March 16, 2023 19:00 JST at Tokyo Dome in Tokyo, Japan
Team	1	2	3	4	5	6	7	8	9	R	H	E
Italy	0	0	0	0	2	0	0	1	0	3	8	1
Japan	0	0	4	0	3	0	2	0	x	9	8	0
WP: Shohei Ohtani (2–0) LP: Joe LaSorsa (0–1); Home runs: ITA: Dominic Fletcher (1); JPN: Kazuma Okamoto (1), Masataka Yoshida (1); Attendance: 41,723; Umpires: HP – Pat Hoberg, 1B – Laz Díaz, 2B – Delfin Colon, 3B – Cuti Suarez; Boxscore

Shohei Ohtani started for Japan, while Ryan Castellani started for Italy. In the bottom of the third, Kensuke Kondo and Ohtani hit back-to-back singles. The next batter, Masataka Yoshida, grounded out to score Kondo. After a Munetaka Murakami walk, Kazuma Okamoto homered to give Japan a 4–0 lead. Ohtani was removed from the game in the top of the fifth after giving up a two-run single to Dominic Fletcher. Ohtani was replaced by Hiromi Itoh, who completed the inning. In the bottom of the inning, Murakami hit a two-run double for Japan, and Okamoto followed up with another double, scoring Murakami. In the seventh, Yoshida homered off Joey Marciano to extend Japan's lead to 8–2. Sōsuke Genda added on another run with a single. Fletcher hit a solo homer in the eighth off Yu Darvish. Mitchell Stumpo struck out the side in the eighth for Italy, and Taisei Ota earned the save for Japan. Ohtani earned the pitching win, having thrown four scoreless innings. With the win, Japan continued their streak of being the only team to reach the semifinals in every WBC to date.

According to the Nikkan Sports, 48% of all households in Japan watched the game, making it the most watched Samurai Japan game in history. This beat the previous record of 44.4% set by the pool game against Korea just six days earlier.

=== Puerto Rico vs Mexico ===
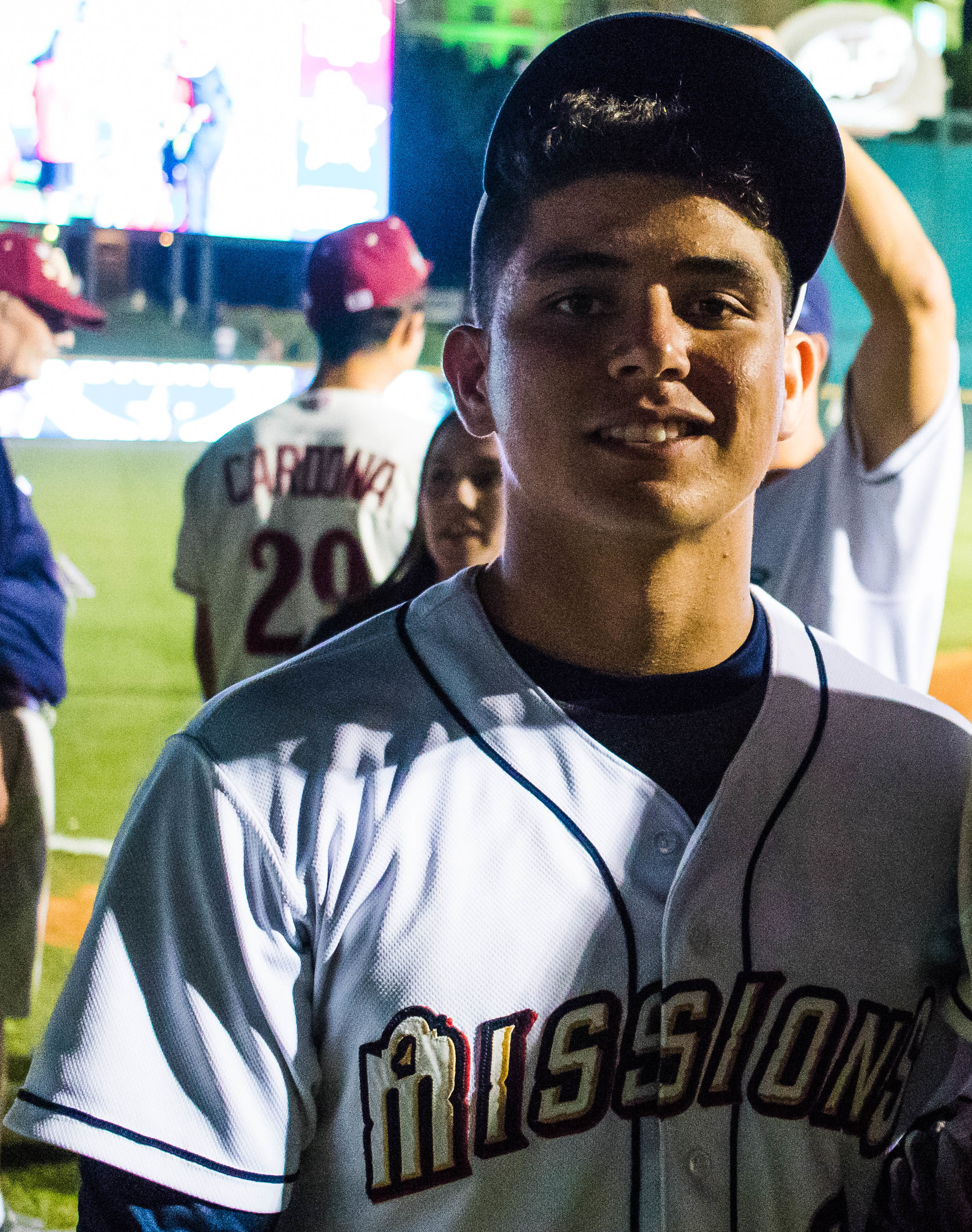
Luis Urías hit the tie-breaking RBI single in the seventh inning that completed Mexico's comeback.

March 17, 2023 19:00 EDT at LoanDepot Park in Miami, United States
Team	1	2	3	4	5	6	7	8	9	R	H	E
Puerto Rico	4	0	0	0	0	0	0	0	0	4	9	0
Mexico	0	1	0	0	1	0	3	0	x	5	9	0
WP: JoJo Romero (2–0) LP: Alexis Díaz (0–1) Sv: Giovanny Gallegos (2); Home runs: PUR: Javier Báez (1), Eddie Rosario (2); MEX: Isaac Paredes (1); Attendance: 35,817; Umpires: HP – Will Little, 1B – Atsushi Fukaya, 2B – Ki Talk Park, 3B – Dan Bellino; Boxscore

This has been the second time Puerto Rico has faced off against Mexico in the WBC, with their first match being in pool play in 2017. Puerto Rico won the game 9–4.

Marcus Stroman started for Puerto Rico, while Julio Urías started for Mexico. Urías got off to a shaky start, as Puerto Rico scored all of their four runs in the first inning. After an Kike Hernández walk and a Nelson Velásquez single, Emmanuel Rivera hit a sac fly to score Hernández for the first run of the game. Javier Báez and Eddie Rosario hit back-to-back homers to put Puerto Rico up 4–0. In the bottom of the second, Isaac Paredes homered for Mexico's first run of the game. Mexico began a rally in the fifth when Alek Thomas and Austin Barnes hit back-to-back singles off Stroman. Stroman then walked Randy Arozarena to load the bases. Alex Verdugo singled in Thomas for a run, which chased Stroman from the game. His replacement, Yacksel Ríos, was able to complete the inning without letting in any additional runs.

In the seventh, Puerto Rico's Alexis Díaz, brother of closer Edwin Díaz (who was injured while celebrating the team's win against the Dominican Republic two days earlier) entered the game to his brother's walkout song "Narco". Díaz promptly gave up a leadoff double to Barnes. He then walked Arozarena and Verdugo to load the bases, and was removed from the game and replaced with Jorge López. López got the next two batters out, bringing up Paredes. Paredes singled to left field, scoring Barnes and Arozarena and tying the game at four. Luis Urías then singled to bring home Verdugo, giving Mexico the lead for the first time. in the eighth, Puerto Rico nearly tied the game when Rivera hit a long ball to center field with a runner on first. However, Arozarena made a leaping catch against the wall to get Rivera out and rob Puerto Rico of the run. The bottom of the eighth was also scoreless. Puerto Rico put two runners on base in the ninth, but Mexico closer Giovanny Gallegos was able to get out of the jam by striking out Hernández. The comeback win sent Mexico to the semifinals for the first time in WBC history.

=== United States vs Venezuela ===
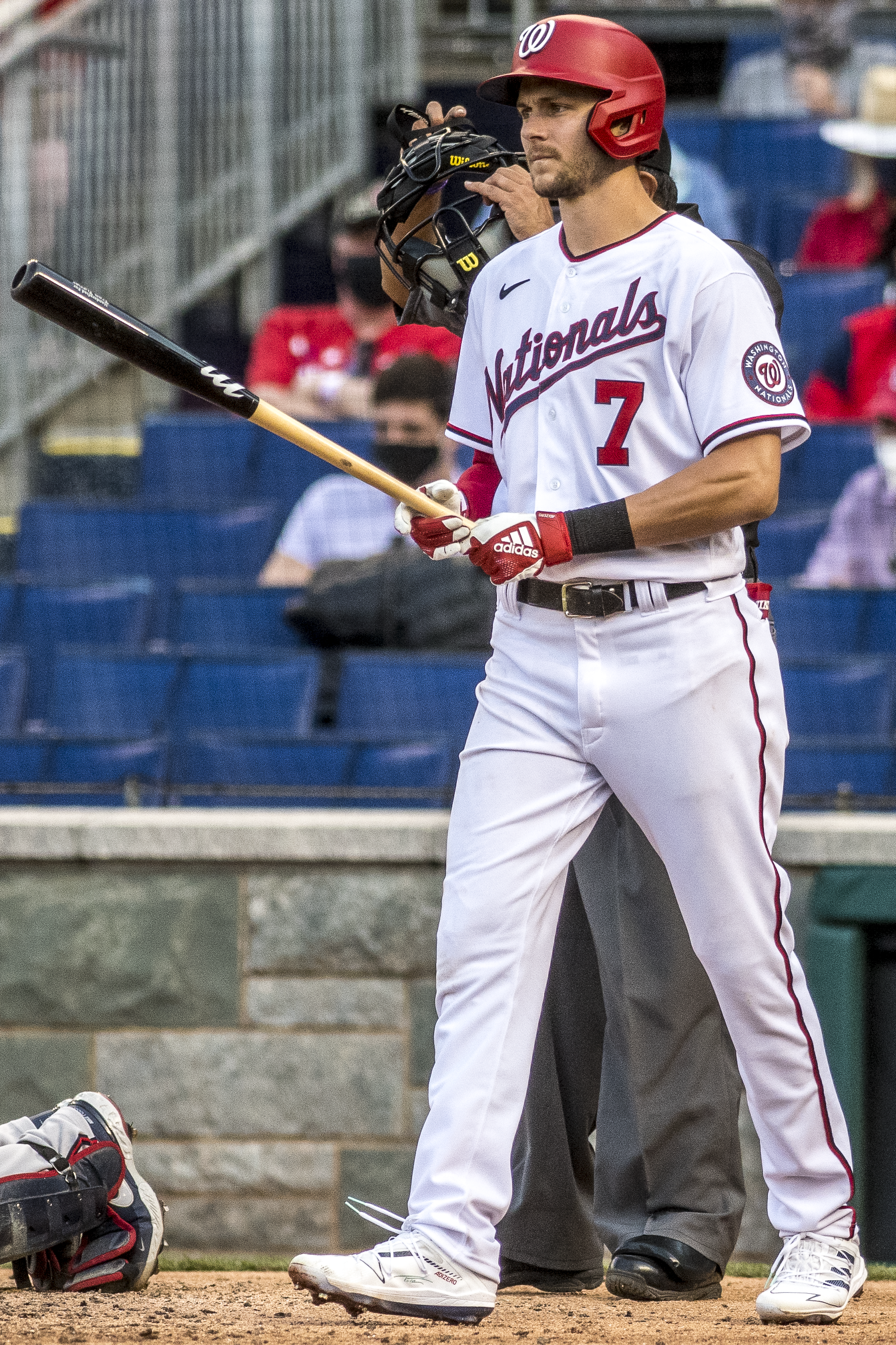
Trea Turner hit the decisive grand slam for the United States in the eighth inning.

March 18, 2023 19:00 EDT at LoanDepot Park in Miami, United States
Team	1	2	3	4	5	6	7	8	9	R	H	E
United States	3	0	0	1	1	0	0	4	0	9	15	0
Venezuela	2	0	0	0	4	0	1	0	0	7	8	3
WP: David Bednar (1–0) LP: José Quijada (0–1) Sv: Ryan Pressly (2); Home runs: USA: Kyle Tucker (1), Trea Turner (2); VEN: Luis Arráez 2 (2); Attendance: 35,792; Umpires: HP – Dan Bellino, 1B – Will Little, 2B – Atsushi Fukaya, 3B – Kun Young Park; Boxscore

The United States and Venezuela previously met in the second round of the 2017 WBC. Team USA won the game, 4–2.

Team USA jumped on top early when Mookie Betts scored on a Mike Trout single that was misthrown by Ronald Acuña Jr. Cardinals teammates Paul Goldschmidt and Nolan Arenado also singled, with Goldschmidt's hit scoring Trout. Kyle Tucker then hit a single to center field, scoring Goldschmidt. Tucker was initially called safe at second after a close tag play with Jose Altuve, but the call was overturned for the first out of the inning. Martín Pérez was replaced with José Ruiz, who retired Tim Anderson and Kyle Schwarber to end the inning. Venezuela immediately struck back in the bottom of the inning with a two-run shot from Luis Arráez. In the fourth, Schwarber scored on a Mookie Betts sac fly to extend Team USA's lead by one. Tucker hit a solo homer in the top of the fifth to make it 5–2 for the United States. Venezuela loaded the bases in the bottom of the inning by way of two walks and an Andrés Giménez single. United States pitcher Daniel Bard threw a wild pitch to allow Gleyber Torres to score. Bard was then removed after walking Anthony Santander. His replacement, Jason Adam, got Arraez to force out, but another run scored. The next batter, Salvador Pérez, doubled to right field, scoring pinch runner Luis Rengifo and tying the game at five. Acuña then hit a sac fly, scoring another run and giving Venezuela the lead. Adam retired David Peralta to end the inning.

In the seventh, Team USA put two runners on base but failed to score. In the bottom of the inning, Arraez hit a solo home run off the foul pole – his second homer of the night. Team USA started off the eighth inning down by two runs as José Quijada walked Anderson with no outs. Pete Alonso then singled, and J. T. Realmuto was hit by a pitch to load the bases. Quijada was removed from the game and was replaced with Silvino Bracho. The first batter Bracho faced was Trea Turner. On an 0–2 count, Turner hit a grand slam to left field, giving the United States a two-run lead. In the bottom of the eighth, Devin Williams was able to work around a leadoff Acuña double by retiring the next three batters. Closer Ryan Pressly retired all three batters he faced in the bottom of the ninth to propel Team USA to the semifinals.

== Semifinals ==
Date	Local time	Road team	Score	Home team	Inn.	Venue	Game duration	Attendance	Boxscore
Mar 19, 2023	19:00 EDT	Cuba	2–14	United States		LoanDepot Park	3:28	35,779	Boxscore
Mar 20, 2023	19:00 EDT	Mexico	5–6	Japan		LoanDepot Park	3:36	35,933	Boxscore

=== Cuba vs United States ===
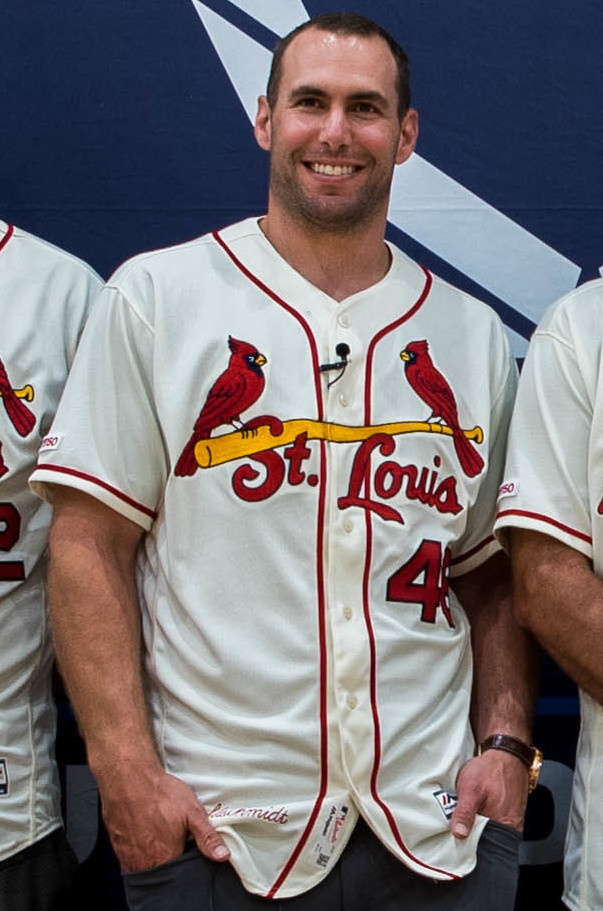
Paul Goldschmidt had four RBIs in the semifinal, including a two-run home run.

March 19, 2023 19:00 EDT at LoanDepot Park in Miami, United States
Team	1	2	3	4	5	6	7	8	9	R	H	E
Cuba	1	0	0	0	1	0	0	0	0	2	12	0
United States	2	1	2	2	2	4	0	1	X	14	14	1
WP: Adam Wainwright (2–0) LP: Roenis Elías (0–1); Home runs: CUB: None; USA: Paul Goldschmidt (1), Trea Turner 2 (4), Cedric Mullins (1); Attendance: 35,779; Umpires: HP – John Tumpane, 1B – Quinn Wolcott, 2B – Lance Barksdale, 3B – Jong Chui Park, LF – Ramiro Alfaro, RF – Edward Pinales; Boxscore

This marked the Cuban national team's first appearance in Miami since early in Fidel Castro's reign, dating back an estimated 60 years. The appearance of the team in Miami, which has the highest concentration of Cuban-Americans (mostly Cuban immigrants or their descendants) in the United States, caused a protest to occur outside the stadium. Protestors viewed the team as in favor of the Cuban government's policies. Anti-government sentiment also occurred inside the stadium, as Yoán Moncada and Luis Robert Jr., the first active MLB players to ever play for the Cuban national team, were booed. Harassment against families of Cuban players and even fights with a player occurred during the game. While Moncada batted in the fifth inning, a fan with a sign demanding justice for demonstrators imprisoned during the 2021 Cuban protests ran onto the field. Chants of "Libertad" and "Patria y Vida" were also heard.

Roenis Elías started for Cuba and Adam Wainwright started for the United States. In the first inning, Cuban players hit three straight infield singles to load the bases. Wainwright then walked Alfredo Despaigne to give Cuba a 1–0 lead with no outs. However, Wainwright was able to retire the next three batters to limit the damage. In the bottom of the inning, Paul Goldschmidt hit a two-run homer after a Mookie Betts double to give the US the lead. Trea Turner followed up on his heroic performance in the quarterfinal game by hitting a solo home run in the second inning. Team USA scored two more in the bottom of the fourth on a Pete Alonso single and a Tim Anderson sacrifice fly. In the fourth, Nolan Arenado tripled in his Cardinals teammate Goldschmidt to give the US a 6–1 lead. Arenado then scored on a wild pitch from Cuba's Carlos Viera. Cuba scored their second run of the game on an Andy Ibáñez single in the top of the fifth. Goldschmidt singled in two more runs off Elián Leyva in the bottom of the inning. Turner hit his second home run of the game in the sixth – a three-run shot off Leyva to give the US a commanding ten-run lead. Trout doubled in Betts in the same inning. In the eighth, Cedric Mullins hit a solo homer to complete the 14–2 blowout victory for the United States. The win sent Team USA to the finals for the second time in a row.

=== Mexico vs Japan ===
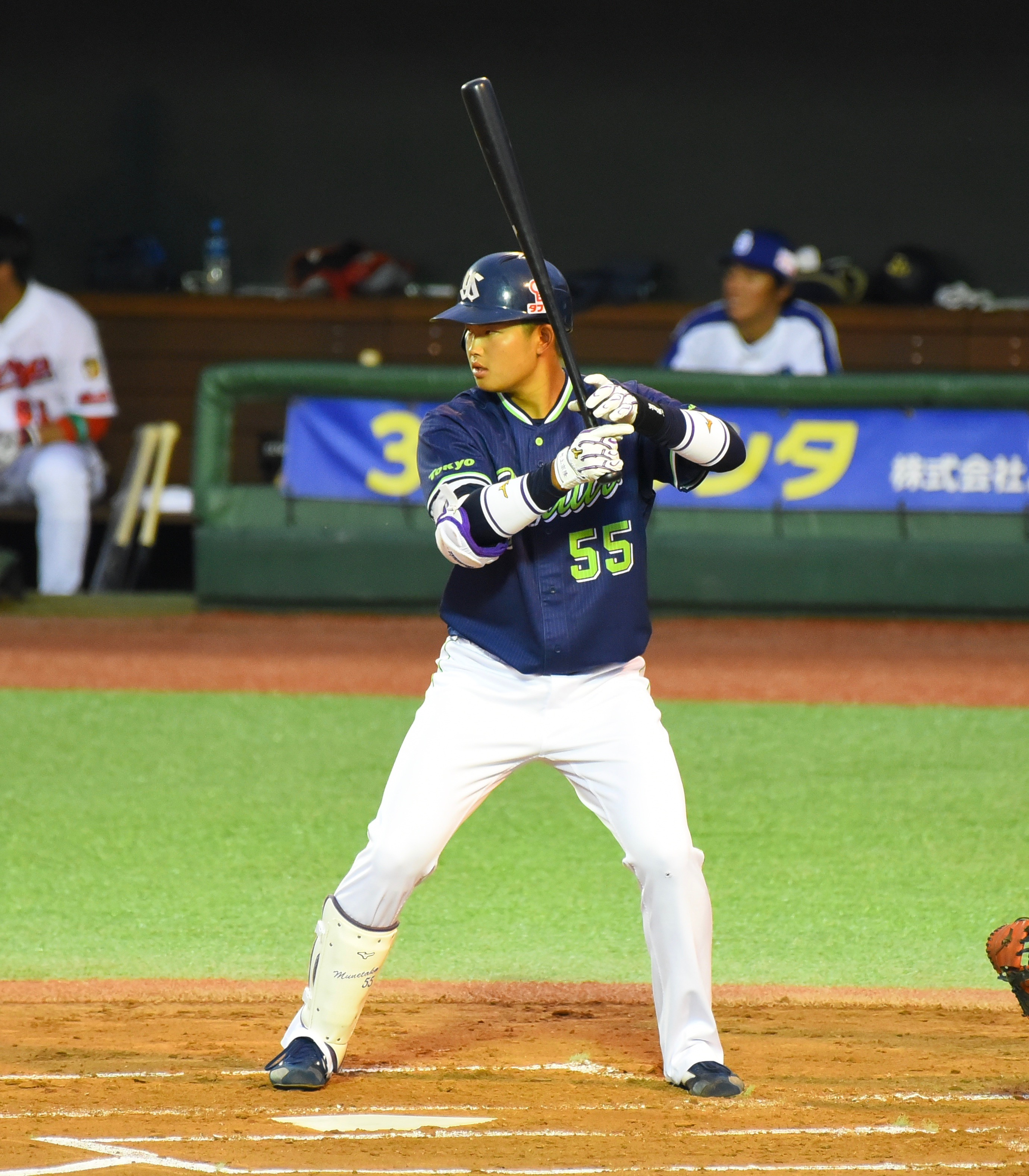
Munetaka Murakami hit a walk-off two-run double in the bottom of the ninth to win the game for Japan.

March 20, 2023 19:00 EDT at LoanDepot Park in Miami, United States
Team	1	2	3	4	5	6	7	8	9	R	H	E
Mexico	0	0	0	3	0	0	0	2	0	5	9	0
Japan	0	0	0	0	0	0	3	1	2	6	10	0
WP: Taisei Ota (1–0) LP: Giovanny Gallegos (0–1); Home runs: MEX: Luis Urías (1); JPN: Masataka Yoshida (2); Attendance: 35,933; Umpires: HP – Quinn Wolcott, 1B – Ramiro Alfaro, 2B – Jong Chui Park, 3B – Lance Barksdale, LF – Edward Pinales, RF – John Tumpane; Boxscore

Patrick Sandoval started for Mexico, while Rōki Sasaki started for Japan. Sandoval and Sasaki kept the game scoreless for the first three innings. In the top of the fourth, Rowdy Tellez and Isaac Paredes hit back-to-back singles for Mexico. The next batter, Luis Urias, hit a three-run home run to give Mexico an early lead. Japan threatened in the bottom of the inning when Kensuke Kondo and Masataka Yoshida singled, but failed to capitalize. Although left fielder Randy Arozarena helped Sandoval by robbing Kazuma Okamoto of a home run, Sandoval was removed from the game after walking Sōsuke Genda after a Tetsuto Yamada single in the fifth. His replacement, José Urquidy, walked Lars Nootbaar to load the bases, but Japan failed to score. Urquidy loaded the bases again in the sixth, but, once again, Japan did not score. In the seventh, Urquidy was taken out after giving up a single to Kondoh with two outs. JoJo Romero, Urquidy's replacement, walked Shohei Ohtani. The next batter, Masataka Yoshida, hit a home run off the foul pole to tie the game at three.

Mexico answered in the top of the eighth with a double from Arozarena off Yoshinobu Yamamoto. Alex Verdugo hit a double of his own on the first pitch, sending Arozarena home to retake the lead. Joey Meneses then singled to put runners at first and third with one out. Yamamoto was replaced with Atsuki Yuasa, who struck out Tellez for the second out. Paredes then singled to bring home pinch runner Jarren Duran. Meneses slid home for another run, but was beaten to the plate by the throw from Yoshida for the final out. Mexico now led 5–3. In the bottom of the eighth, Mexico's Jesús Cruz hit Kazuma Okamoto with a pitch and then gave up a single to Yamada. Genda sacrifice bunted to advance the runners to second and third. The next batter was Hotaka Yamakawa, who hit a sac fly to left field to score pinch runner Takumu Nakano. This cut Mexico's lead to one. Cruz was replaced by Gerardo Reyes, who walked Nootbaar before striking out Kondoh for the third out. Japan closer Taisei Ota had a fairly smooth ninth inning, facing only four batters. Mexico led 5–4 going into the bottom of the ninth, where closer Giovanny Gallegos was sent in to record the final three outs. Gallegos gave up a first-pitch double to Ohtani, putting him in scoring position with no outs. After a mound visit, Gallegos walked Yoshida (Ukyo Shuto pinch ran), bringing Munetaka Murakami to the plate. On a 1–1 pitch, Murakami doubled to center field to score both runners, winning the game for Japan.

== Final ==
March 21, 2023 19:00 EDT (UTC−4) at LoanDepot Park in Miami, United States
Team	1	2	3	4	5	6	7	8	9	R	H	E
United States	0	1	0	0	0	0	0	1	0	2	9	0
Japan	0	2	0	1	0	0	0	0	X	3	5	0
WP: Shōta Imanaga (1–0) LP: Merrill Kelly (0–1) Sv: Shohei Ohtani (1); Home runs: USA: Trea Turner (5), Kyle Schwarber (2); JPN: Munetaka Murakami (1), Kazuma Okamoto (2); Attendance: 36,098; Umpires: HP – Lance Barksdale, 1B – John Tumpane, 2B – Edward Pinales, 3B – Ramiro Alfaro, LF – Jong Chui Park, RF – Quinn Wolcott; Boxscore
