= 2023 World Baseball Classic championship =

2023 World Baseball Classic Championship Game
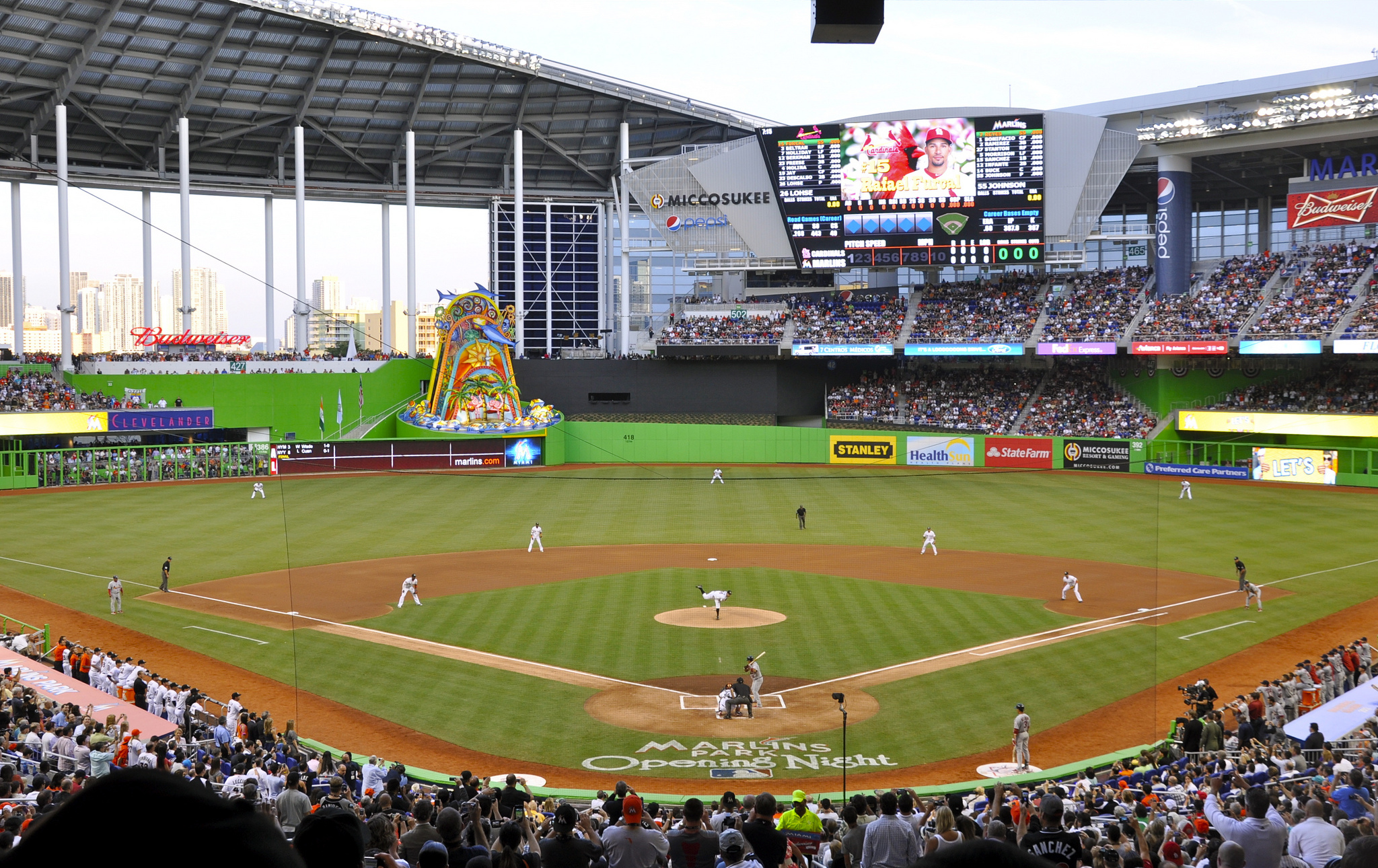
- LoanDepot Park, Miami in 2012
United States	Japan
2	3
	1	2	3	4	5	6	7	8	9	R	H	E
United States	0	1	0	0	0	0	0	1	0	2	9	0
Japan	0	2	0	1	0	0	0	0	X	3	5	0
- Date: March 21, 2023
- Venue: LoanDepot Park
- City: Miami, Florida, U.S.
- Managers: Mark DeRosa (United States); Hideki Kuriyama (Japan)
- Umpires: HP: (United States) Lance Barksdale; 1B: (United States) John Tumpane; 2B: (Dominican Republic) Edward Pinales; 3B: (Colombia) Ramiro Alfaro; LF: (South Korea) Jong-chul Park; RF: (United States) Quinn Wolcott
- MVP: Shohei Ohtani (Japan)
- Attendance: 36,098
- Time of game: 19:00 EDT
- Television: Multiple

The 2023 World Baseball Classic (WBC) championship game, also commonly known as 2023 WBC Final Game was the final game of the 2023 World Baseball Classic, the fifth edition of the World Baseball Classic, a men's international baseball tournament sanctioned by the World Baseball Softball Confederation (WBSC) in partnership with World Baseball Classic Inc. (WBCI). The game was played on March 21, 2023, at LoanDepot Park in Miami, Florida, United States, between hosts and defending champion United States and two-time champion Japan. Japan won 3–2 to earn a record-extending third World Baseball Classic title. Shohei Ohtani won the most valuable player award.

Unlike in 2009, 2013 and 2017, the 2023 U.S. lineup attracted distinguished players, which some commentators claimed contributed to generating excitement for the final. The U.S. general manager Tony Reagins credited Mike Trout, a three-time major league MVP, for committing to the team early (in July 2022) which made it easier to convince others to join.

The championship game was one of the most watched games in baseball history with the game attracting an average television viewership of 5.2 million people in the U.S. and a reported 62 million television viewers in Japan representing a total of 42.4% of households in the country despite the game taking place at 8 am JST. The game was widely praised as an instant classic, with the ending duel between team captains and Los Angeles Angels teammates Mike Trout and Shohei Ohtani being considered as one of the greatest moments in the history of the sport.

== Road to the championship game ==
The United States was the victor of the previous edition of the WBC, in 2017 defeating Japan in the semi-final round. Japan won the 2006 and 2009 editions of the WBC.

In 2023, Japan won all four games in Pool B, which it hosted at the Tokyo Dome. They then defeated Italy in the quarterfinals. Japan defeated Mexico in the semifinals to advance to the championship.

The United States went 3–1 in Pool C, advancing as the pool's runner-up behind Mexico, who they lost to in an upset 11–5 result. The United States defeated Venezuela in the quarterfinals and Cuba in the semifinals.

Note: In all results below, the score of the finalist is given first (H: home; A: away).

United States		Round	Japan	
Opponent	Result	Group stage	Opponent	Result
Great Britain	6–2 (H)	Match 1	China	8–1 (H)
Mexico	5–11 (H)	Match 2	South Korea	13–4 (H)
Canada	12–1 (7) (H)	Match 3	Czech Republic	10–2 (H)
Colombia	3–2 (A)	Match 4	Australia	7–1 (A)
Pool C runners-up: Pos / Team / Pld / W / L / RF / RA / PCT / GB / Qualification; 1 / Mexico / 4 / 3 / 1 / 27 / 14 / .750 (Note: Mexico defeated USA, 11–5) / — / Advance to quarterfinals Qualification for 2026 World Baseball Classic; 2 / United States (H) / 4 / 3 / 1 / 26 / 16 / .750 / — / Advance to quarterfinals Qualification for 2026 World Baseball Classic; 3 / Canada / 4 / 2 / 2 / 27 / 30 / .500 / 1 / Qualification for 2026 World Baseball Classic; 4 / Great Britain / 4 / 1 / 3 / 18 / 31 / .250 (Note: Great Britain defeated Colombia, 7–5) / 2 / Qualification for 2026 World Baseball Classic; 5 / Colombia / 4 / 1 / 3 / 12 / 19 / .250 / 2; Source: MLB; Rules for classification: Tiebreakers (H) Hosts; Notes:		Final standings	Pool B winners: Pos / Team / Pld / W / L / RF / RA / PCT / GB / Qualification; 1 / Japan (H) / 4 / 4 / 0 / 38 / 8 / 1.000 / — / Advance to quarterfinals Qualification for 2026 World Baseball Classic; 2 / Australia / 4 / 3 / 1 / 29 / 19 / .750 / 1 / Advance to quarterfinals Qualification for 2026 World Baseball Classic; 3 / South Korea / 4 / 2 / 2 / 40 / 26 / .500 / 2 / Qualification for 2026 World Baseball Classic; 4 / Czech Republic / 4 / 1 / 3 / 16 / 30 / .250 / 3 / Qualification for 2026 World Baseball Classic; 5 / China / 4 / 0 / 4 / 10 / 50 / .000 / 4; Source: MLB; Rules for classification: Tiebreakers (H) Hosts	
Opponent	Result	Knockout stage	Opponent	Result
Venezuela	9–7 (A)	Quarterfinals	Italy	9–3 (H)
Cuba	14–2 (H)	Semifinals	Mexico	6–5 (H)

== Game ==
=== Summary ===
The starting pitchers for the championship game were Shōta Imanaga for Japan and Merrill Kelly for the United States. Trea Turner hit a solo home run for the United States off of Imanaga in the top of the second inning. Turner tied Lee Seung-yuop (South Korea) in the 2006 tournament for the most home-runs in a single WBC tournament. Munetaka Murakami tied the game with a solo home run off of Kelly in the bottom of the second inning. Japan continued the inning by loading the bases with singles from Kazuma Okamoto and Sosuke Genda and a walk to Yuhei Nakamura. After Aaron Loup relieved Kelly for the United States, Lars Nootbaar hit a RBI ground out. In the bottom of the fourth inning, Kazuma Okamoto hit a solo home run for Japan off of Kyle Freeland to give Japan its final run.

Both teams then remained scoreless until the top of the eighth inning, when Kyle Schwarber hit a solo home run for the United States off of Yu Darvish. Leading 3–2 in the ninth inning, Japan used their designated hitter, Shohei Ohtani, to record the save.

During the final at-bat, in a moment often described as storybook-like, Ohtani struck out Mike Trout, fellow renowned teammate of the Los Angeles Angels, to win the tournament for Japan. Ohtani threw a 87.2 mph slider on a full count to secure the victory, the previous two strikes being down-the-middle swung-on 100 mph fastballs.

Ohtani won the WBC's most valuable player award after batting .435 with a 1.86 earned run average pitching. Following the final, Takuya Mitsuda, the author and illustrator of the Major baseball manga that was adapted into an anime series, created a commemorative illustration featuring Ohtani alongside Major protagonist Goro Honda (Shigeno) that was published in Sports Nippon. Major fans had compared Ohtani's duel with Trout to Goro's duel with Joe Gibson Jr. in one scene.

=== Details ===
Linescore

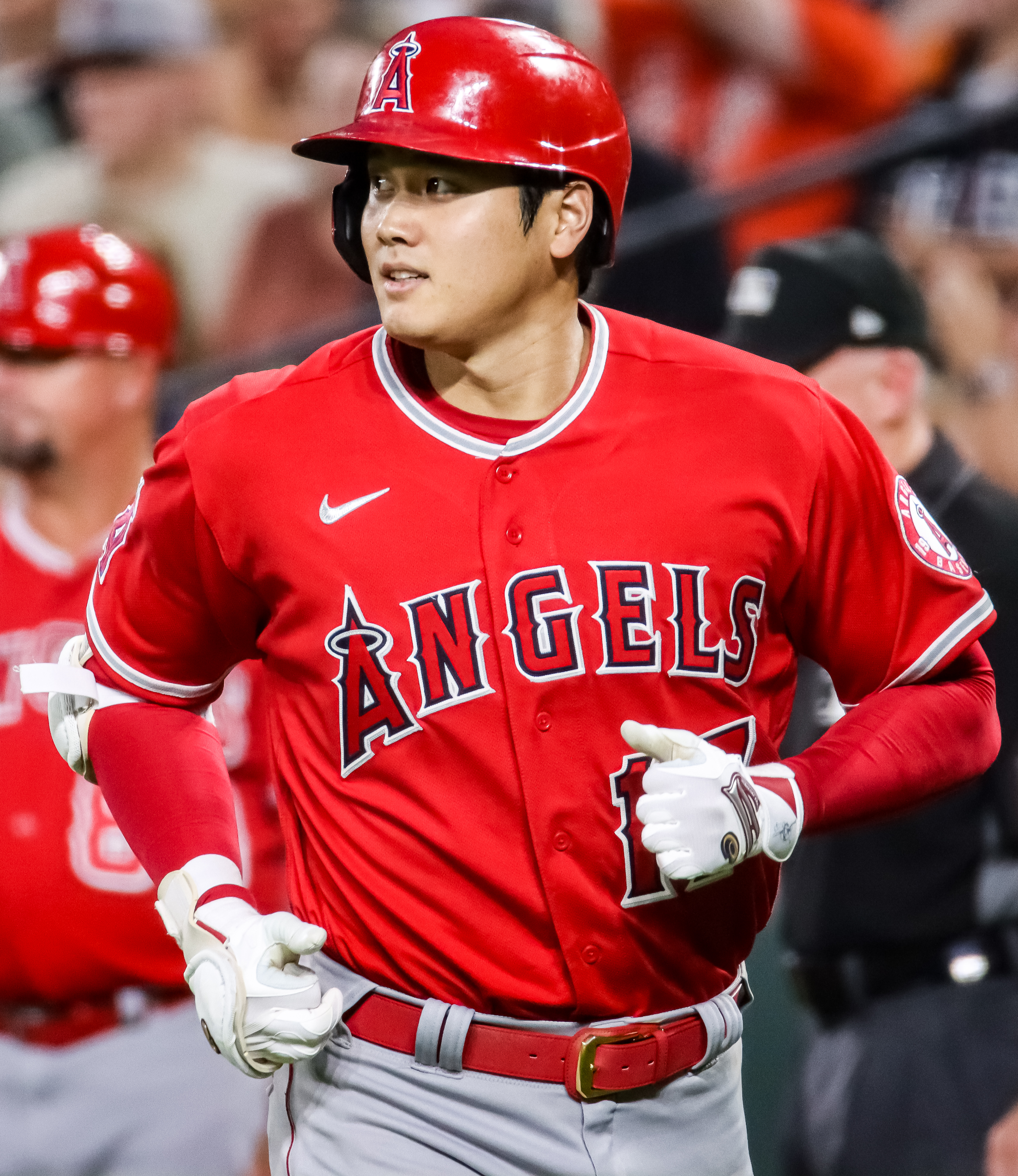
Shohei Ohtani, the most valuable player of the tournament

March 21, 2023 19:00 EDT (UTC−4) at LoanDepot Park in Miami, United States
Team	1	2	3	4	5	6	7	8	9	R	H	E
United States	0	1	0	0	0	0	0	1	0	2	9	0
Japan	0	2	0	1	0	0	0	0	X	3	5	0
WP: Shōta Imanaga (1–0) LP: Merrill Kelly (0–1) Sv: Shohei Ohtani (1); Home runs: USA: Trea Turner (5), Kyle Schwarber (2); JPN: Munetaka Murakami (1), Kazuma Okamoto (2); Attendance: 36,098; Umpires: HP – Lance Barksdale, 1B – John Tumpane, 2B – Edward Pinales, 3B – Ramiro Alfaro, LF – Jong Chui Park, RF – Quinn Wolcott; Boxscore

Boxscore

United States - Batting
Player	Position	AB	R	H	RBI	BB	SO	LOB	BA
Mookie Betts	RF	5	0	2	0	0	0	3	.313
Mike Trout	CF	5	0	1	0	0	3	3	.296
Paul Goldschmidt	1B	4	0	0	0	0	2	4	.280
Nolan Arenado	3B	3	0	1	0	1	0	1	.385
Kyle Schwarber	DH	3	1	1	1	1	0	2	.214
Trea Turner	SS	4	1	2	1	0	1	2	.214
J. T. Realmuto	C	4	0	1	0	0	0	1	.500
Cedric Mullins	LF	4	0	0	0	0	2	2	.200
Tim Anderson	2B	2	0	1	0	0	0	0	.333
Jeff McNeil	2B (PH)	0	0	0	0	2	0	0	.111
Bobby Witt Jr.	PR	0	0	0	0	0	0	0	.500

United States - Pitching
Player	IP	H	R	ER	BB	SO	HR	ERA
Merrill Kelly	1 1/3	3	2	2	2	1	1	8.31
Aaron Loup	2/3	0	0	0	0	0	0	0.00
Kyle Freeland	3	1	1	1	2	2	1	3.00
Jason Adam	1	0	0	0	3	2	0	0.00
David Bednar	1	1	0	0	0	0	0	2.25
Devin Williams	1	0	0	0	1	2	0	0.00

Japan - Batting
Player	Position	AB	R	H	RBI	BB	SO	LOB	BA
Lars Nootbaar	CF–LF	4	0	0	1	0	0	5	.269
Kensuke Kondoh	RF	3	0	0	0	1	0	2	.346
Shohei Ohtani	DH	3	0	1	0	1	1	1	.435
Masataka Yoshida	LF	3	0	0	0	1	1	3	.409
Taisei Makihara	CF	0	0	0	0	0	0	0	.500
Munetaka Murakami	3B	4	1	1	1	0	2	1	.231
Kazuma Okamoto	1B	4	2	2	1	0	2	0	.333
Tetsuto Yamada	2B	2	0	0	0	2	0	1	.267
Sōsuke Genda	SS	3	0	1	0	1	1	1	.250
Yuhei Nakamura	C	1	0	0	0	2	0	0	.429

Japan - Pitching
Player	IP	H	R	ER	BB	SO	HR	ERA
Shōta Imanaga	2	4	1	1	0	2	1	3.00
Shosei Togo	2	0	0	0	2	2	0	1.80
Hiroto Takahashi	1	2	0	0	0	2	0	3.00
Hiromi Itoh	1	0	0	0	0	1	0	0.00
Taisei Ota	1	0	0	0	1	0	0	0.00
Yu Darvish	1	2	1	1	0	0	1	6.00
Shohei Ohtani	1	0	0	0	1	1	0	1.86
