= List of Major League Baseball players from Japan =

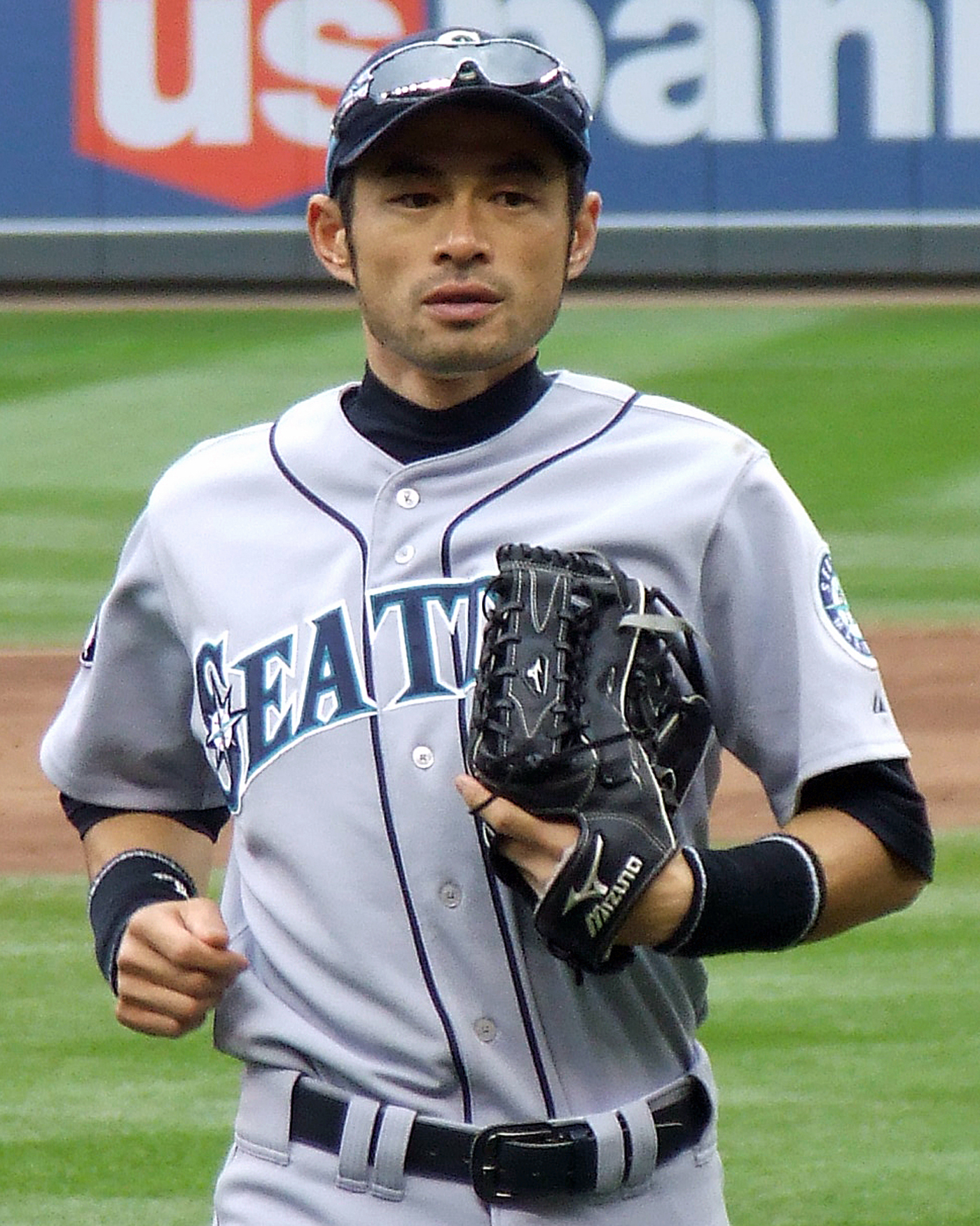
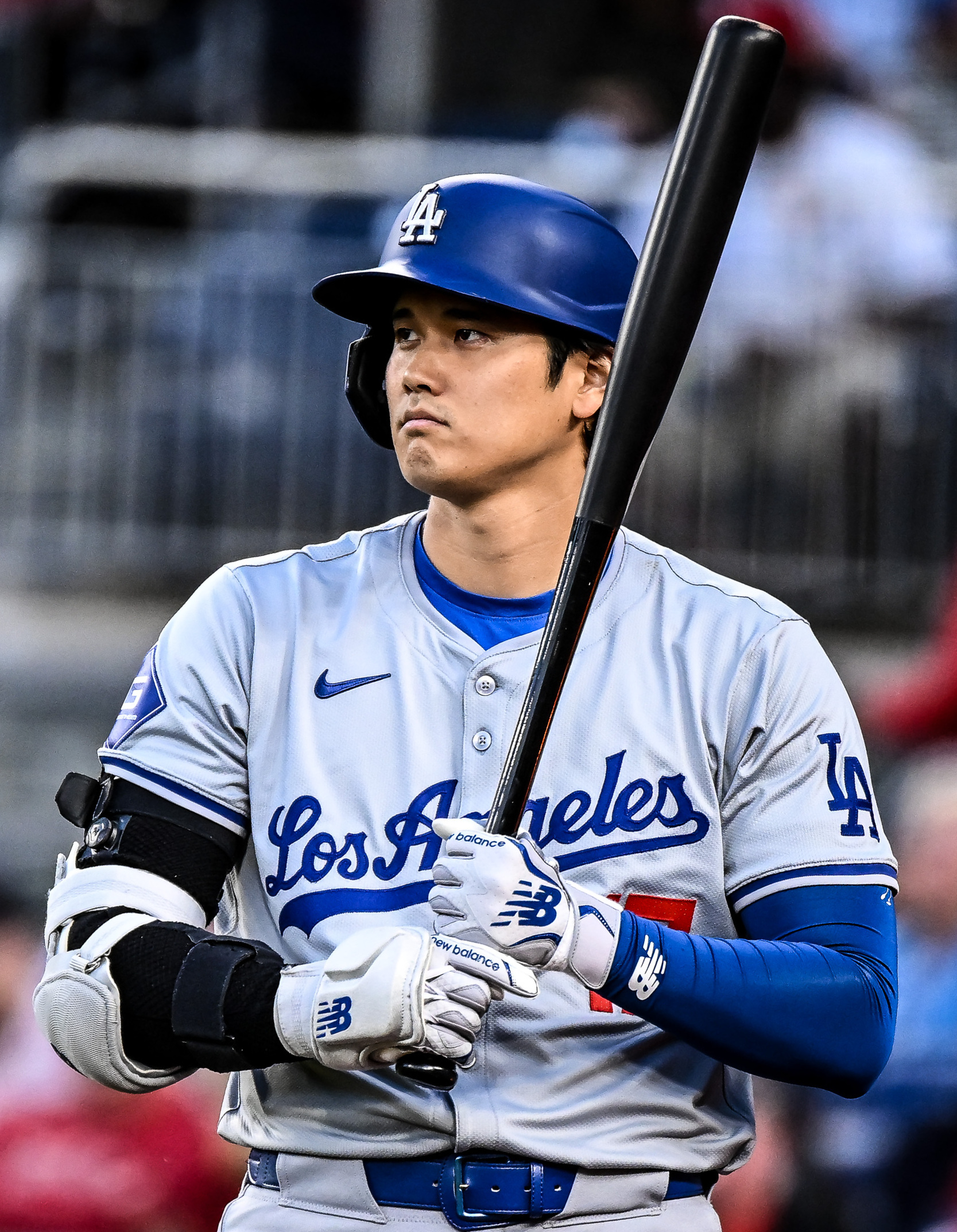
Ichiro Suzuki (left) and Shohei Ohtani (right) are the only Japanese players to have received the Commissioner's Historic Achievement Award.

A total of 74 Japanese-born players have played in at least one Major League Baseball (MLB) game. Of these players, twelve are on existing MLB rosters. The first instance of a Japanese player playing in MLB occurred in 1964, when the Nankai Hawks, a Nippon Professional Baseball (NPB) team, sent three exchange prospects to the United States to gain experience in MLB's minor league system. One of the players, pitcher Masanori Murakami, was named the California League Rookie of the Year while playing for the Fresno Giants (the San Francisco Giants' Class-A team). Giants executives were impressed with his talent and on September 1, 1964, Murakami was promoted, thus becoming the first Japanese player to play in MLB, as well as being the first Asian player. After Murakami put up good pitching statistics as a reliever, Giants executives sought to exercise a clause in their contract with the Hawks that, they claimed, allowed them to buy up an exchange prospect's contract. NPB officials objected, stating that they had no intention of selling Murakami's contract to the Giants and telling them that Murakami was merely on loan for the 1964 season. After a two-month stalemate the Giants eventually agreed to send Murakami back to the Hawks after the 1965 season. This affair led to the 1967 United States – Japanese Player Contract Agreement, also known as the "Working Agreement", between MLB and NPB, which was basically a hands-off policy.

For thirty years Murakami was the only Japanese player to appear in an MLB game. Pitcher Hideo Nomo, with the help of agent Don Nomura, became the second Japanese player to play in MLB in 1995. Nomo, who was not yet eligible for free agency in Japan, was advised by Nomura that a "voluntary retirement" clause in the Working Agreement did not specify that a player wishing to play again after retiring must return to NPB. Nomo utilized this loophole to void his NPB contract with the Kintetsu Buffaloes and play in MLB. He announced his retirement from NPB in late 1994 and signed with the Los Angeles Dodgers in February 1995. Nomo's maneuver and Hideki Irabu's later MLB contractual complications were contributing factors to a major revision of the Working Agreement in 1998 that created the posting system. Since its inception 22 Japanese players have been signed through the system, however one of these players, Shinji Mori, did not play in a single MLB game due to an injury. NPB players who have nine or more years of playing service with NPB can become international free agents and do not need to enter MLB through the posting system. The remaining Japanese players that have played in MLB have either signed as free agents or signed as amateur players. Mac Suzuki, Kazuhito Tadano, and Junichi Tazawa are the only Japanese players to have debuted in MLB without previously playing in NPB. All 30 MLB teams have had at least one Japanese player on their roster.

Japanese players have had a range of success in MLB. Twelve players have been selected to participate in the All-Star Game; Ichiro Suzuki has made the most appearances with ten. In addition to these selections, Ichiro has won several prestigious MLB awards including the American League (AL) Rookie of the Year Award and the AL Most Valuable Player (MVP) Award in 2001, the All-Star Game MVP Award in 2007 and multiple Gold Glove and Silver Slugger Awards. Ichiro also holds the MLB record for recording the most hits in a single season. Hideo Nomo was the only Japanese pitcher to throw a no-hitter until Hisashi Iwakuma accomplished the feat on August 12, 2015. Nomo threw two in total; the first came in 1996 and the last occurred in 2001. Hideki Matsui holds the MLB record for most consecutive games played to start a career in the league (518 games) and has the most seasons with 100+ runs batted in (4) among Japanese and all Asian-born players (2003-2005, 2007).

Currently, Shohei Ohtani is the only player in MLB history to win the AL Most Valuable Player (MVP) Award twice unanimously in 2021 and 2023, the first player in MLB history with 10 wins and 40 home runs in a season, and the first player in MLB history to be named to both first teams for the 2023 All-MLB Team in the same season (as a designated hitter and starting pitcher respectively). Ohtani is also the first Japanese-born player to hit for the cycle, the first Japanese-born player to win a major league home run title, leading the American League with 44 home runs, the first Japanese-born player to win the AL Hank Aaron Award, and the first Japanese player to have the most popular Major League Baseball jersey sales. In addition, Ohtani has also won the AL Rookie of the Year Award in 2018, the National League (NL) Championship Series MVP Award in 2025, four Silver Slugger Awards, and four Edgar Martínez Outstanding Designated Hitter Awards. In 2023, Ohtani signed a 10-year, $700 million contract with the Dodgers, the largest contract in professional sports history at the time, while Yoshinobu Yamamoto received the highest guaranteed salary ever given to a pitcher, signing a 12-year, $325 million contract with the Dodgers. In 2024, Ohtani was unanimously named the NL MVP after becoming the first player in MLB history to record 50 home runs and 50 stolen bases in a season. (Note: Ohtani joined Frank Robinson as the only players to win the MVP award in both leagues and became the first DH to win the award in MLB history.)

13 Japanese players have appeared in the World Series. Out of these players, So Taguchi, Ohtani, and Yamamoto have won the most with two each. Hideki Matsui and Yamamoto are the only Japanese players to win the World Series MVP Award. The 2007 World Series featured the most Japanese players, with Daisuke Matsuzaka and Hideki Okajima pitching for the Boston Red Sox, and Kazuo Matsui playing for the Colorado Rockies. This was later tied in the 2025 World Series with Ohtani, Roki Sasaki, and Yamamoto all playing for the Dodgers.

== Table key ==
Key to symbols in player table
*	Signed with a Major League Baseball team via the posting system
§	Signed with a Major League Baseball team without first playing for a Nippon Professional Baseball team
^{†}	Inducted into the Japanese Baseball Hall of Fame
^{‡}	Inducted into both the Japanese Baseball Hall of Fame and the National Baseball Hall of Fame

== Current players ==
Players from Japan active within Major League Baseball
Player	Position	MLB debut	Games (Note: Games played as of July 31, 2026)	Team(s)	Status	Notes
Yu Darvish*	SP	April 9, 2012	297	Texas Rangers (2012–2017); Los Angeles Dodgers (2017); Chicago Cubs (2018–2020); San Diego Padres (2021–2025)	Restricted	
Shohei Ohtani*	TWP	March 29, 2018	1,137	Los Angeles Angels (2018–2023); Los Angeles Dodgers (2024–present)	Active	
Yusei Kikuchi*	SP	March 21, 2019	206	Seattle Mariners (2019–2021); Toronto Blue Jays (2022–2024); Houston Astros (2024); Los Angeles Angels (2025–present)	60-day IL	
Seiya Suzuki*	RF	April 7, 2022	625	Chicago Cubs (2022–present)	Active	
Masataka Yoshida*	LF	March 30, 2023	378	Boston Red Sox (2023–present)	Active	
Kodai Senga	SP	April 2, 2023	65	New York Mets (2023–present)	Active	
Yoshinobu Yamamoto*	SP	March 20, 2024	67	Los Angeles Dodgers (2024–present)	Active	
Yuki Matsui	RP	March 20, 2024	156	San Diego Padres (2024–present)	Active	
Shota Imanaga*	SP	April 1, 2024	76	Chicago Cubs (2024–present)	Active	
Roki Sasaki*	SP	March 19, 2025	29	Los Angeles Dodgers (2025–present)	Active	
Tomoyuki Sugano	SP	March 30, 2025	49	Baltimore Orioles (2025); Colorado Rockies (2026–present)	Active	
Munetaka Murakami*	IF	March 26, 2026	74	Chicago White Sox (2026–present)	Active	
Kazuma Okamoto*	IF	March 27, 2026	107	Toronto Blue Jays (2026–present)	Active	
Tatsuya Imai*	SP	March 29, 2026	15	Houston Astros (2026–present)	Active	
Rikuu Nishida^{§}	OF	May 25, 2026	12	Chicago White Sox (2026–present)	Minors	

== Former players ==
Players from Japan that formerly appeared on Major League Baseball rosters
Player	Position	MLB debut	Final MLB game	Games	Former MLB Team(s)	Notes
Masanori Murakami	P	September 1, 1964	October 1, 1965	54	San Francisco Giants (1964–1965)	
Hideo Nomo^{†}	P	May 2, 1995	April 18, 2008	324	Los Angeles Dodgers (1995–1998, 2002–2004); New York Mets (1998); Milwaukee Brewers (1999); Detroit Tigers (2000); Boston Red Sox (2001); Tampa Bay Devil Rays (2005); Kansas City Royals (2008)	
Mac Suzuki^{§}	P	July 7, 1996	June 28, 2002	117	Seattle Mariners (1996, 1998–1999); Kansas City Royals (1999–2001, 2002); Colorado Rockies (2001); Milwaukee Brewers (2001)	
Shigetoshi Hasegawa	P	April 5, 1997	September 28, 2005	517	Anaheim Angels (1997–2001); Seattle Mariners (2002–2005)	
Takashi Kashiwada	P	May 1, 1997	September 18, 1997	35	New York Mets (1997)	
Hideki Irabu	P	July 10, 1997	July 12, 2002	126	New York Yankees (1997–1999); Montreal Expos (2000–2001); Texas Rangers (2002)	
Masato Yoshii	P	April 5, 1998	September 11, 2002	162	New York Mets (1998–1999); Colorado Rockies (2000); Montreal Expos (2001–2002)	
Masao Kida	P	April 5, 1999	August 3, 2005	65	Detroit Tigers (1999–2000); Los Angeles Dodgers (2003–2004); Seattle Mariners (2004–2005)	
Tomokazu Ohka	P	July 19, 1999	October 4, 2009	204	Boston Red Sox (1999–2001); Montreal Expos/Washington Nationals (2001–2005); Milwaukee Brewers (2005–2006); Toronto Blue Jays (2007); Cleveland Indians (2009)	
Kazuhiro Sasaki^{†}	P	April 5, 2000	September 28, 2003	228	Seattle Mariners (2000–2003)	
Ichiro Suzuki*^{‡}	OF	April 2, 2001	March 21, 2019	2,653	Seattle Mariners (2001–2012, 2018–2019); New York Yankees (2012–2014); Miami Marlins (2015–2017)	
Tsuyoshi Shinjo	OF	April 3, 2001	June 27, 2003	303	New York Mets (2001, 2003); San Francisco Giants (2002)	
Takahito Nomura	P	April 3, 2002	May 15, 2002	21	Milwaukee Brewers (2002)	
Satoru Komiyama	P	April 4, 2002	September 11, 2002	25	New York Mets (2002)	
Kazuhisa Ishii*	P	April 6, 2002	September 28, 2005	105	Los Angeles Dodgers (2002–2004); New York Mets (2005)	
So Taguchi	OF	June 10, 2002	October 4, 2009	672	St. Louis Cardinals (2002–2007); Philadelphia Phillies (2008); Chicago Cubs (2009)	
Hideki Matsui^{†}	OF	March 31, 2003	July 22, 2012	1,236	New York Yankees (2003–2009); Los Angeles Angels of Anaheim (2010); Oakland Athletics (2011); Tampa Bay Rays (2012)	
Kazuo Matsui	IF	April 6, 2004	May 18, 2010	630	New York Mets (2004–2006); Colorado Rockies (2006–2007); Houston Astros (2008–2010)	
Akinori Otsuka*	P	April 6, 2004	July 1, 2007	236	San Diego Padres (2004–2005); Texas Rangers (2006–2007)	
Shingo Takatsu^{†}	P	April 9, 2004	October 2, 2005	99	Chicago White Sox (2004–2005); New York Mets (2005)	
Kazuhito Tadano^{§}	P	April 27, 2004	July 16, 2005	15	Cleveland Indians (2004–2005)	
Tadahito Iguchi	IF	April 4, 2005	September 28, 2008	493	Chicago White Sox (2005–2007); Philadelphia Phillies (2007, 2008); San Diego Padres (2008)	
Keiichi Yabu	P	April 9, 2005	September 27, 2008	100	Oakland Athletics (2005); San Francisco Giants (2008)	
Norihiro Nakamura*	IF	April 10, 2005	May 6, 2005	17	Los Angeles Dodgers (2005)	
Kenji Johjima	C	April 3, 2006	October 3, 2009	462	Seattle Mariners (2006–2009)	
Takashi Saito	P	April 9, 2006	September 30, 2012	338	Los Angeles Dodgers (2006–2008); Boston Red Sox (2009); Atlanta Braves (2010); Milwaukee Brewers (2011); Arizona Diamondbacks (2012)	
Akinori Iwamura*	IF	April 2, 2007	September 26, 2010	408	Tampa Bay Devil Rays/Rays (2007–2009); Pittsburgh Pirates (2010); Oakland Athletics (2010)	
Hideki Okajima	P	April 2, 2007	June 13, 2013	266	Boston Red Sox (2007–2011); Oakland Athletics (2013)	
Daisuke Matsuzaka*	P	April 5, 2007	September 25, 2014	158	Boston Red Sox (2007–2012); New York Mets (2013–2014)	
Kei Igawa*	P	April 7, 2007	June 27, 2008	16	New York Yankees (2007–2008)	
Masumi Kuwata	P	June 10, 2007	August 13, 2007	19	Pittsburgh Pirates (2007)	
Kosuke Fukudome	OF	March 31, 2008	June 3, 2012	596	Chicago Cubs (2008–2011); Cleveland Indians (2011); Chicago White Sox (2012)	
Kazuo Fukumori	P	March 31, 2008	April 24, 2008	4	Texas Rangers (2008)	
Masahide Kobayashi	P	April 2, 2008	May 7, 2009	67	Cleveland Indians (2008–2009)	
Hiroki Kuroda^{†}	P	April 4, 2008	September 25, 2014	212	Los Angeles Dodgers (2008–2011); New York Yankees (2012–2014)	
Yasuhiko Yabuta	P	April 5, 2008	October 4, 2009	43	Kansas City Royals (2008–2009)	
Koji Uehara	P	April 8, 2009	September 2, 2017	436	Baltimore Orioles (2009–2011); Texas Rangers (2011–2012); Boston Red Sox (2013–2016); Chicago Cubs (2017)	
Kenshin Kawakami	P	April 11, 2009	September 9, 2010	52	Atlanta Braves (2009–2010)	
Ken Takahashi	P	May 2, 2009	September 25, 2009	28	New York Mets (2009)	
Junichi Tazawa^{§}	P	August 7, 2009	September 30, 2018	388	Boston Red Sox (2009–2016); Miami Marlins (2017–2018); Los Angeles Angels (2018)	
Hisanori Takahashi	P	April 7, 2010	April 11, 2013	168	New York Mets (2010); Los Angeles Angels of Anaheim (2011–2012); Pittsburgh Pirates (2012); Chicago Cubs (2013)	
Ryota Igarashi	P	April 8, 2010	August 12, 2012	83	New York Mets (2010–2011); Toronto Blue Jays (2012); New York Yankees (2012)	
Tsuyoshi Nishioka*	IF	April 1, 2011	August 8, 2012	71	Minnesota Twins (2011–2012)	
Yoshinori Tateyama	P	May 24, 2011	September 26, 2012	53	Texas Rangers (2011–2012)	
Nori Aoki*	OF	April 6, 2012	October 1, 2017	759	Milwaukee Brewers (2012–2013); Kansas City Royals (2014); San Francisco Giants (2015); Seattle Mariners (2016); Houston Astros (2017); Toronto Blue Jays (2017); New York Mets (2017)	
Munenori Kawasaki	IF	April 7, 2012	October 2, 2016	276	Seattle Mariners (2012); Toronto Blue Jays (2013–2015); Chicago Cubs (2016)	
Hisashi Iwakuma	P	April 20, 2012	May 3, 2017	150	Seattle Mariners (2012–2017)	
Kyuji Fujikawa	P	April 1, 2013	May 15, 2015	29	Chicago Cubs (2013–2014); Texas Rangers (2015)	
Kensuke Tanaka	OF	July 9, 2013	July 28, 2013	15	San Francisco Giants (2013)	
Masahiro Tanaka*	P	April 4, 2014	September 23, 2020	174	New York Yankees (2014–2020)	
Tsuyoshi Wada	P	July 8, 2014	September 4, 2015	21	Chicago Cubs (2014–2015)	
Toru Murata	P	June 28, 2015	June 28, 2015	1	Cleveland Indians (2015)	
Kenta Maeda*	SP	April 6, 2016	April 29, 2025	226	Los Angeles Dodgers (2016–2019); Minnesota Twins (2020–2023); Detroit Tigers (2024–2025)	
Yoshihisa Hirano	P	March 29, 2018	September 27, 2020	150	Arizona Diamondbacks (2018–2019); Seattle Mariners (2020)	
Kazuhisa Makita*	P	March 30, 2018	September 29, 2018	27	San Diego Padres (2018)	
Yoshi Tsutsugo*	IF	July 24, 2020	July 31, 2022	182	Tampa Bay Rays (2020–2021); Los Angeles Dodgers (2021); Pittsburgh Pirates (2021–2022)	
Shogo Akiyama	OF	July 24, 2020	September 16, 2021	142	Cincinnati Reds (2020–2021)	
Shun Yamaguchi*	P	July 26, 2020	September 27, 2020	17	Toronto Blue Jays (2020)	
Hirokazu Sawamura	P	April 2, 2021	August 28, 2022	104	Boston Red Sox (2021–2022)	
Kohei Arihara*	P	April 3, 2021	September 10, 2022	15	Texas Rangers (2021–2022)	
Shintaro Fujinami*	RP	April 1, 2023	September 29, 2023	64	Oakland Athletics (2023); Baltimore Orioles (2023)	
Naoyuki Uwasawa*	RP	May 2, 2024	May 3, 2024	2	Boston Red Sox (2024)	
Shinnosuke Ogasawara*	SP	July 6, 2025	September 28, 2025	23	Washington Nationals (2025)	

== Awards, records and notable accomplishments ==
=== Baseball Hall of Fame ===
- Ichiro Suzuki, inducted in the class of 2025

=== Seattle Mariners Hall of Fame ===
- Ichiro Suzuki, inducted on August 27, 2022.

=== Awards and accolades ===
- Commissioner's Historic Achievement Award: Ichiro Suzuki, 2005; Shohei Ohtani, 2021
- Most Valuable Player Award: Ichiro Suzuki, 2001 AL; Shohei Ohtani, 4 times, 2021 (unanimous selection), 2023 AL (unanimous selection), 2024 NL (unanimous selection), 2025 NL (unanimous selection)
- Rookie of the Year Award: Hideo Nomo, 1995 NL; Kazuhiro Sasaki, 2000 AL; Ichiro Suzuki, 2001 AL; Shohei Ohtani, 2018 AL
- World Series MVP: Hideki Matsui, 2009; Yoshinobu Yamamoto, 2025
- ALCS MVP: Koji Uehara, 2013
- NLCS MVP: Shohei Ohtani, 2025
- All-Star Game MVP: Ichiro Suzuki, 2007
- Gold Glove Award: Ichiro Suzuki, 10 times, 2001–2010 AL OF
- Silver Slugger Award: Ichiro Suzuki, 3 times, 2001, 2007, 2009 AL OF; Shohei Ohtani, 4 times, 2021, 2023 AL DH, 2024 NL DH, 2025 NL DH
- Hank Aaron Award: Shohei Ohtani, 3 times, 2023 AL, 2024 NL, 2025 NL
- Edgar Martínez Award: Shohei Ohtani, 5 times, 2021, 2022, 2023, 2024, 2025
- All-MLB Team: Yu Darvish, First team SP 2020; Kenta Maeda, Second team SP 2020; Shohei Ohtani, 8 times, First team DH/Second team SP 2021, First team SP/Second team DH 2022, First team DH/First team SP 2023, First team DH 2024, First team DH 2025; Shota Imanaga, Second team SP 2024; Yoshinobu Yamamoto, First team SP 2025
- Player of the Month: Shohei Ohtani, 6 times, June, July 2021, June, July 2023 AL, September 2024, May 2025 NL; Ichiro Suzuki, August 2004 AL; Hideki Matsui, July 2007 AL
- Pitcher of the Month: Hideo Nomo, 2 times, June 1995, September 1996 NL; Hideki Irabu, 2 times, May 1998, July 1999 AL; Masahiro Tanaka, May 2014 AL; Yu Darvish, 2 times, July/August 2020, September 2022 NL; Yoshinobu Yamamoto, 2 times, April, September 2025 NL; Shohei Ohtani, April 2026 NL
- Rookie of the Month: Ichiro Suzuki, 4 times, April, May, August, September 2001 AL; Shohei Ohtani, 2 times, April, September 2018 AL; Kazuhisa Ishii, April 2002 NL; Hideki Matsui, June 2003 AL; Hideki Okajima, April 2007 AL; Yu Darvish, April 2012 AL; Seiya Suzuki, April 2022 NL; Shota Imanaga, April 2024 NL; Munetaka Murakami, May 2026 AL; Kazuma Okamoto, June 2026 AL
- Player of the Week: Shohei Ohtani, 11 times, April 8, September 9, 2018, June 20, July 4, 2021, June 18, July 2, July 30, 2023 AL, May 5, June 23, September 22, September 29, 2024 NL; Ichiro Suzuki, 5 times, August 8, 2004, June 4, 2006, September 26, 2010, September 23, 2012, AL, August 7, 2016 NL; Hideo Nomo, 4 times, June 25, 1995, April 14, September 22, 1996 NL, April 8, 2001 AL; Hideki Matsui, 4 times, June 29, 2003, May 30, 2004, June 19, 2005, July 24, 2011 AL; Kazuhiro Sasaki, April 29, 2001 AL; Daisuke Matsuzaka, May 20, 2007 AL; Hisashi Iwakuma, August 16, 2015 AL; Seiya Suzuki, 2 times, April 17, 2022, September 28, 2025 NL; Yu Darvish, September 18, 2022 NL; Masataka Yoshida, May 7, 2023 AL
- MLB Players Choice Player of the Year: Shohei Ohtani, 2021
- MLB Players Choice Outstanding Player: Ichiro Suzuki, 2004 AL; Shohei Ohtani, 3 times, 2021, 2023 AL, 2024 NL
- MLB Players Choice Outstanding Rookie: Ichiro Suzuki, 2001 AL
- Associated Press Athlete of the Year: Shohei Ohtani, 4 times, 2021, 2023, 2024, 2025
- Sporting News MLB Player of the Year Award: Shohei Ohtani, 2 times, 2021, 2024
- Sporting News Rookie Player of the Year Award: Ichiro Suzuki, 2001 AL; Shohei Ohtani, 2018 AL
- Sporting News Rookie Pitcher of the Year Award: Hideo Nomo, 1995 NL, Kazuhiro Sasaki, 2000 AL
- Baseball America Major League Player of the Year: Shohei Ohtani, 2021, 2023
- Baseball America Rookie of the Year Award: Hideo Nomo, 1995; Shohei Ohtani, 2018
- Baseball America All-Rookie Team: Yu Darvish, 2012 SP; Masahiro Tanaka, 2014 SP; Kenta Maeda, 2016 SP; Shohei Ohtani, 2018 DH; Seiya Suzuki, 2022 DH; Kodai Senga, 2023 SP; Shota Imanaga, 2024 SP
- Baseball Digest Player of the Year: Shohei Ohtani, 2021
- Statcast Player of the Year: Shohei Ohtani, 2021
- MLB.com Defensive Player of the Year Award: Ichiro Suzuki, 2005
- MLB.com Setup Man of the Year Award: Hideki Okajima, 2007
- Best Male Athlete ESPY Award: Shohei Ohtani, 2022
- Best Major League Baseball Player ESPY Award: Shohei Ohtani, 5 times, 2021, 2022, 2023, 2024, 2025
- United States Sports Academy Athlete of the Month: Shohei Ohtani, June 2021
- Time 100: Shohei Ohtani, 2021

=== Hitting ===
- Most hits in a single season: Ichiro Suzuki, 262 (2004) MLB Record
- Most career interleague hits: Ichiro Suzuki, 367 MLB Record
- Most consecutive seasons of 200 or more hits: Ichiro Suzuki, 10 (2001–2010) MLB Record
- Most seasons with 200 or more hits: Ichiro Suzuki, 10 (2001–2010) MLB Record (tie)
- Most games with five or more hits in a season: Ichiro Suzuki, 4 (2004) MLB Record (tie)
- Most pinch-hit plate appearances in a season: Ichiro Suzuki, 109 (2017) MLB Record
- Most pinch-hit at-bats in a season: Ichiro Suzuki, 100 (2017) MLB Record
- Batting titles: Ichiro Suzuki, 2001 (.350 Avg) and 2004 (.372 Avg)
- Home run title: Shohei Ohtani, 2023 AL (44 HRs) and 2024 NL (54 HRs)
- RBI title: Shohei Ohtani, 2024 NL (130 RBI)
- Only inside-the-park home run in All-Star game history: Ichiro Suzuki, July 10, 2007, AT&T Park, hitting leadoff for the American League
- Only MLB player to hit a home run in his first plate appearance of his first three seasons: Kazuo Matsui, 2004 (First pitch), 2005, 2006 (Inside-the-park home run)
- First Japanese player to play in the World Series: Tsuyoshi Shinjo, October 19, 2002, Giants vs. Angels, Edison Field, hitting 9th in the lineup as the Designated hitter
- First Japanese player to hit a home run: Hideo Nomo, April 28, 1998, Dodgers vs. Brewers, Dodger Stadium
- First Japanese player to hit a grand slam: Tsuyoshi Shinjo, May 17, 2002, Giants vs. Marlins, AT&T Park
- First Japanese player to hit a walk-off hit: Tsuyoshi Shinjo, May 20, 2001, Mets vs. Dodgers, Shea Stadium
- First Japanese player to hit a walk-off home run: Hideki Matsui, July 17, 2003, Yankees vs. Indians, Yankee Stadium
- First Japanese player to hit a home run in the postseason: Hideki Matsui, October 4, 2003, Yankees vs. Twins, Metrodome
- First Japanese player to hit a home run in the World Series: Hideki Matsui, October 19, 2003, Yankees vs. Marlins, Yankee Stadium
- First Japanese player to hit for the cycle: Shohei Ohtani, June 13, 2019, Angels vs. Rays, Tropicana Field (Home run (1st), Double (3rd), Triple (5th), Single (7th))
- 3,000 hit club: Ichiro Suzuki; entered August 7, 2016
- Most walks in a 3-game span: Shohei Ohtani, September 22–24, 2021 (11) AL Record, MLB Record (tie)
- Highest home run hit in the Statcast era: Shohei Ohtani, 162 feet, April 30, 2023, Angels vs. Brewers, American Family Field, Top of 3rd, 2 outs, 1st pitch off Colin Rea
- Fastest exit velocity by a left-handed hitter in the Statcast era: Shohei Ohtani, 119.1 mph. April 10, 2022, Angels vs. Astros, Angel Stadium. Bottom of 3rd, 1 out, 3-2 count, 7th pitch off José Urquidy (Ground rule double)

=== Baserunning ===
- Stolen base champion: Ichiro Suzuki, 2001 AL (56 Stolen Bases)
- Most consecutive stolen bases: Ichiro Suzuki, April 29, 2006 – May 16, 2007 (45) AL Record
- First Japanese player to record a stolen base: Masato Yoshii, June 24, 2000, Rockies vs. Diamondbacks, Bank One Ballpark, Top of 5th, 2nd base off Randy Johnson/Kelly Stinnett, 1 out, 0-1 count

=== Pitching ===
- No-hitter
  - Hideo Nomo (Los Angeles Dodgers): September 17, 1996, vs. Colorado Rockies at Coors Field (110P, 8K, 4BB, 30BF)
    - Still the only no-hitter at Coors Field, which opened in 1995. It was accomplished before the humidor was installed at Coors Field in 2002. Highest paid attendance (50,066) among all the no-hitters in existing ballparks.
  - Hideo Nomo (Boston Red Sox): April 4, 2001, vs. Baltimore Orioles at Oriole Park at Camden Yards (110P, 11K, 3BB, 30BF)
    - Still the only no-hitter at Oriole Park, which opened in 1992. Earliest no-hitter in a season among all the no-hitters in existing ballparks. Nomo is one of only five players to have pitched at least one no-hitter game in both the National League and American League in Major League Baseball history.
  - Hisashi Iwakuma (Seattle Mariners): August 12, 2015, vs. Baltimore Orioles at Safeco Field (116P, 7K, 3BB, 29BF)
    - Fourth no-hitter at Safeco Field, behind Philip Humber, Kevin Millwood, and Félix Hernández.
- Maddux
  - Tomo Ohka (Milwaukee Brewers): June 14, 2005, vs. Tampa Bay Devil Rays at Tropicana Field (98P, 9H, 6K, 0BB, 36BF)
  - Hiroki Kuroda (Los Angeles Dodgers): July 7, 2008, vs. Atlanta Braves at Dodger Stadium (91P, 1H, 6K, 0BB, 28BF)
  - Masahiro Tanaka (New York Yankees): April 27, 2017, vs. Boston Red Sox at Fenway Park (97P, 3H, 3K, 0BB, 29BF)
  - Yusei Kikuchi (Seattle Mariners): August 18, 2019, vs. Toronto Blue Jays at Rogers Centre (96P, 2H, 8K, 1BB, 29BF)
- Strikeout champion: Hideo Nomo, 2 times, 1995 NL (236 Strikeouts) & 2001 AL (220 Strikeouts); Yu Darvish, 2013 AL (277 Strikeouts, led both leagues)
- Fastest to reach 1,500 career strikeouts in MLB history: Yu Darvish, June 21, 2021 (1,216 1/3 innings, 197 games)
- Fastest to reach 1,000 career strikeouts in MLB history: Yu Darvish, September 8, 2017 (812 innings, 128 games)
- Most consecutive quality starts from debut: Masahiro Tanaka (16) MLB Record (tie)
- Lowest single-season WHIP in MLB history (at least 50 innings): Koji Uehara, 2013 (0.565)
- Most saves in the postseason: Koji Uehara, 2013 (7 saves) MLB Record (tie)
- Most strikeouts in a single inning: Kazuhiro Sasaki, April 4, 2003 (4 strikeouts in the 9th Inning) MLB Record (tie)
- Most consecutive starts with 8+ strikeouts and 0 walks: Yu Darvish (5), July 22 - August 26, 2019 MLB Record
- Most consecutive no decisions: Yu Darvish (10), May 4 - June 21, 2019 MLB Record (tie)
- First Japanese pitcher to be recorded with a win in an All-Star Game: Masahiro Tanaka, AL 2019
- First Japanese pitcher to be recorded with a save in an All-Star Game: Kazuhiro Sasaki, AL 2001
- First pitcher to allow 2 or fewer runs in each of his first 7 postseason starts: Masahiro Tanaka
- Fastest pitch recorded by a Japanese pitcher: Shintaro Fujinami, 102.1 mph: July 4, 2023, Athletics vs. Tigers, Comerica Park. Bottom of 9th, 3rd pitch to Miguel Cabrera

== All-Star Game selections ==
Players from Japan that have been selected to participate in a Major League Baseball All-Star Game
Player	League	Selections	Year(s)	Notes
Ichiro Suzuki	AL	10	**2001**, **2002**, **2003**, **2004**, 2005, **2006**, **2007**, **2008**, **2009**, **2010**	Inside-the-park home run, All-Star Game MVP (2007)
Shohei Ohtani	AL, NL	6	**2021**, **2022**, **2023**, **2024**, **2025**, **2026**	Recorded a win as the starting pitcher (2021); First player in history to be selected as both designated hitter and starting pitcher (2021); Selected as both the designated hitter and a starting pitcher, but did not pitch (2022); Selected as both the designated hitter and a starting pitcher. Automatic selection as the starting DH by leading the AL in votes (2023); Automatic selection as the starting DH by leading the NL in votes (2025, 2026); Selected but did not play due to injury (2026)
Yu Darvish	AL, NL	5	2012, 2013, 2014, 2017, 2021	Selected as the winner of the Final Vote but did not play (2012); Selected but did not play (2013); Selected but did not play (2017); Selected but did not play due to being on the injured list (2021)
Kazuhiro Sasaki	AL	2	2001, 2002	Closed and recorded a save (2001)
Hideki Matsui	AL	2	**2003**, 2004	Selected as the winner of the Final Vote (2004)
Masahiro Tanaka	AL	2	2014, 2019	Selected but did not play due to being on the disabled list (2014); Selected in place of injured Marcus Stroman (2019); First Yankee pitcher to win an All-Star Game in 71 years (2019)
Yusei Kikuchi	AL	2	2021, 2025	Selected but did not play (2021); Selected but did not play (2025)
Yoshinobu Yamamoto	NL	2	2025, 2026	Selected but did not play (2025)
Hideo Nomo	NL	1	**1995**	Starting pitcher
Shigetoshi Hasegawa	AL	1	2003	
Hideki Okajima	AL	1	2007	Selected as the winner of the Final Vote, but did not play
Takashi Saito	NL	1	2007	
Kosuke Fukudome	NL	1	**2008**	
Hisashi Iwakuma	AL	1	2013	Selected but did not play
Koji Uehara	AL	1	2014	Selected in place of injured Masahiro Tanaka
Kodai Senga	NL	1	2023	Selected in place of Marcus Stroman, but did not play
Shota Imanaga	NL	1	2024	
Munetaka Murakami	AL	1	2026	Selected in place of injured Byron Buxton

Bold indicates the player was selected to the starting roster

== World Series appearances ==
Players from Japan that have been a part of a Major League Baseball World Series
Player	World Series championships	World Series appearances	Year(s)	Notes
Hideki Irabu	2	2	**1998 Yankees**; **1999 Yankees**	First Japanese player to win a World Series. Did not play in either the 1998 or 1999 World Series but was on the 1998 active roster.
So Taguchi	2	3	2004 Cardinals; **2006 Cardinals**; **2008 Phillies**	Did not play in the 2008 World Series, despite being on the Phillies' active roster
Shohei Ohtani	2	2	**2024 Dodgers**; **2025 Dodgers**	
Yoshinobu Yamamoto	2	2	**2024 Dodgers**; **2025 Dodgers**	World Series MVP (2025)
Hideki Matsui	1	2	2003 Yankees; **2009 Yankees**	World Series MVP (2009)
Tadahito Iguchi	1	1	**2005 White Sox**	
Hideki Okajima	1	1	**2007 Red Sox**	First Japanese pitcher to appear in a World Series. With Matsuzaka, first Japanese pitcher to win the World Series. The 2007 World Series was the first in which Japanese players appeared for both teams.
Daisuke Matsuzaka	1	1	**2007 Red Sox**	First Japanese pitcher to both start and win a World Series game and first Japanese pitcher to win an MLB playoff game during the 2007 postseason. With Okajima, first Japanese pitcher to win the World Series. The 2007 World Series was the first in which Japanese players appeared for both teams.
Junichi Tazawa	1	1	**2013 Red Sox**	
Koji Uehara	1	1	**2013 Red Sox**	First Japanese pitcher to record a save in a World Series game
Roki Sasaki	1	1	**2025 Dodgers**	
Kenta Maeda	0	2	2017 Dodgers; 2018 Dodgers	First Japanese player to play in consecutive World Series
Tsuyoshi Shinjo	0	1	2002 Giants	First Japanese player to play in a World Series game
Kazuo Matsui	0	1	2007 Rockies	The 2007 World Series was the first in which Japanese players appeared for both teams.
Akinori Iwamura	0	1	2008 Rays	
Nori Aoki	0	1	2014 Royals	
Yu Darvish	0	1	2017 Dodgers	
Yoshi Tsutsugo	0	1	2020 Rays	

Bold indicates that the team won the World Series that year
