= Hideo Nomo =

Japanese baseball player (born 1968)

Hideo Nomo 野茂 英雄
- Nomo with the Columbus Clippers in 2005
- Pitcher
- Born: August 31, 1968 (age 58); Osaka, Japan
- Batted: Right Threw: Right

Professional debut
- NPB: April 10, 1990, for the Kintetsu Buffaloes
- MLB: May 2, 1995, for the Los Angeles Dodgers

Last appearance
- NPB: 1994, for the Kintetsu Buffaloes
- MLB: April 18, 2008, for the Kansas City Royals

NPB statistics
- Win–loss record: 78–46
- Earned run average: 3.15
- Strikeouts: 1,204

MLB statistics
- Win–loss record: 123–109
- Earned run average: 4.24
- Strikeouts: 1,918
- Stats at Baseball Reference

Teams
- Kintetsu Buffaloes (1990–1994); Los Angeles Dodgers (1995–1998); New York Mets (1998); Milwaukee Brewers (1999); Detroit Tigers (2000); Boston Red Sox (2001); Los Angeles Dodgers (2002–2004); Tampa Bay Devil Rays (2005); Kansas City Royals (2008)

Career highlights and awards
- NPB: 5× NPB All-Star (1990-1994); Pacific League MVP (1990); Eiji Sawamura Award (1990); Triple Crown (1990); Pacific League Rookie of the Year (1990); Best Nine Award (1990); MLB: All-Star (1995); NL Rookie of the Year (1995); 2× Strikeout leader (1995, 2001); Pitched two career no-hitters (1996, 2001)

Member of the Japanese

Baseball Hall of Fame
- Induction: 2014
Medals
Men's baseball
Representing Japan
Olympic Games
Silver medal – second place	1988 Seoul	Team
Asian Baseball Championship
Gold medal – first place	1989 Seoul	Team
Intercontinental Cup
Silver medal – second place	1989 San Juan	Team

Hideo Nomo (野茂 英雄, Nomo Hideo; born August 31, 1968) is a Japanese former baseball pitcher who played in Nippon Professional Baseball (NPB) and Major League Baseball (MLB). He achieved early success in his native country, where he played with the Kintetsu Buffaloes from 1990 to 1994. He then exploited a loophole to free himself from his contract, and became the first Japanese major leaguer to permanently relocate to MLB in the United States, debuting with the Los Angeles Dodgers in 1995. Nomo became just the second Japanese player in American professional baseball after Masanori Murakami who played in MLB three decades earlier, and Nomo's star status is often credited with opening the door for Japanese players in MLB.

Nomo pitched over a span of 13 seasons in the American major leagues with eight different teams, before retiring in 2008. In 1995, he won the National League (NL) Rookie of the Year Award and was named an MLB All-Star. He twice led MLB in strikeouts and also threw two no-hitters, including the only no-hitter in Coors Field history, a ballpark notoriously hard to pitch in due to elevation from sea level affecting pitched and batted balls. He was the only Japanese pitcher in MLB to throw a no-hitter until the Seattle Mariners' Hisashi Iwakuma did so on August 12, 2015, against the Baltimore Orioles.

Nomo was well known for his distinctive "tornado" pitching windup and delivery. In 2014, Nomo was inducted into the Japanese Baseball Hall of Fame. He currently resides in Los Angeles, California.

== Early life ==
Nomo was born in Minato-ku, Osaka, Japan, into the working-class family of Shizuo, a fisherman and postal worker, and Kayoko, a part-time supermarket employee. As a youth, Nomo was shy and withdrawn, although passionate about baseball. Nomo took up softball at the age of 8 before making the switch to baseball three years later. He developed his corkscrew-style pitching motion in order to impress his father while playing catch. He believed that rotating from having his back turned to his target would help him add speed to his pitches.

Nomo graduated from Seijo Industrial High School in Osaka where he grew to 188 centimetres (6 ft 2 in) and 91 kilograms (201 lb). However, he was not selected in the Nippon Professional Baseball draft due to issues with his control. Instead, in 1988, Nomo joined Shin-Nittetsu Sakai, an Industrial League team representing Nippon Steel's branch in Sakai, Osaka. During this time, Nomo slept with a tennis ball taped between his fingers in order to perfect his forkball grip.

== Professional career ==
Nomo honed his forkball and his control while pitching in the Industrial League. At the 1988 Summer Olympics, Nomo played for the silver medal-winning Japanese baseball team.

=== Kintetsu Buffaloes ===
The Kintetsu Buffaloes of Nippon Professional Baseball (NPB) drafted him in 1989. Nomo debuted with them in 1990 and was an immediate success, going 18–8 but more impressively striking out 287 hitters in just 235 innings. The strikeout numbers were attributed to his unorthodox wind-up, where he turned his back to the hitter, raised his pivot leg, and paused for a second before throwing. The delivery increased his pitch speed and made it more difficult for batters to spot the ball coming out of his hand. The windup gave him the nickname "Tornado". Nomo won the Triple Crown that year.

In his first four seasons, Nomo was consistent, and consistently good, winning 17 or 18 games each year. His fifth season in 1994 was marred by a shoulder injury and netted him only eight wins. Nomo's forkball became famous for being unpredictable for hitters and catchers alike.

Nomo had become one of the most popular baseball players in Japan but after the 1994 season, Nomo got into a contract dispute with team management. The Buffaloes rebuffed Nomo's demands to have a contract agent and multi-year contract. Because he was drafted by Kintetsu, the Buffaloes retained exclusive rights to Nomo; however, Nomo's agent, Don Nomura, found a loophole in the Japanese Uniform Players Contract to enable him to become a free agent. The "voluntary retirement clause" required a retired player who returned to active status to return to their former team if they played in Japan, but he was allowed to play for whomever he wished outside of Japan. This led to him heading to the U.S., where in February 1995, the Los Angeles Dodgers signed him.

Nomo chose to wear uniform number 16 because it was the number worn by his friend Takaaki Ishibashi of the comedy duo Tunnels in the film Major League II, in which Ishibashi portrayed a Japanese baseball player. At a time when many figures in Japanese baseball were skeptical of Nomo's decision to pursue a career in the major leagues, Ishibashi publicly supported him, including by inviting him to appear on Tunnels' television program for a farewell special held before his departure to the United States.

=== Los Angeles Dodgers ===
Nomo made his U.S. pro baseball debut with the Bakersfield Blaze on April 27, 1995, against the Rancho Cucamonga Quakes. Placed on a 90-pitch limit, and throwing mainly fastballs, Nomo pitched 5 1/3 innings, taking the 2–1 loss. On May 2, after a month in the minors necessitated by a player's strike, he became the first Japanese-born Major Leaguer to appear in a game since Masanori Murakami in 1965. He was also the first Japanese-born player to relocate permanently to the American major leagues, as Murakami played only two seasons with the San Francisco Giants and then returned to the Japanese major leagues for the remainder of his career. The pressure on Nomo would be tremendous, and Japanese media and fans appeared in large numbers in games he started. Nomo's games were regularly broadcast live to Japan, despite the fact most people would be waking up when he started games. Nomo's decision to pursue a career in Major League Baseball was met with a positive reception in the United States. At the time, MLB was suffering from declining popularity in the aftermath of the 1994–95 Major League Baseball strike, which had drawn criticism for the league's perceived emphasis on money over the game itself. In contrast, Nomo's willingness to chase his dream by competing in a foreign country resonated with many fans, who viewed him as a symbol of baseball's traditional spirit and a reminder of the passion for the game that had been fading.

The tornado delivery that baffled batters in Japan had the same effect on major league hitters, and he led the league in strikeouts in 1995 (while finishing second in walks) and was second with a 2.54 ERA. He struck out 11.101 batters per 9 innings to break Sandy Koufax's single-season franchise record of 10.546 in 1962. He also started that year's All-Star Game, striking out three of the six batters he faced. He topped out at 93 mph in that game. Nomo was named NL Rookie of the Year honors that year over future Hall of Famer Chipper Jones. Nomo had another fine season in 1996 which was capped by a no-hitter thrown on September 17 in the unlikeliest of places, Denver's Coors Field, a notorious hitters' park because of its high elevation, semi-arid climate, and lack of foul territory. Nomo's no-hitter remains the only one in Coors Field, and he was the last Dodger to throw a no-hitter until Josh Beckett completed one on May 25, 2014.

As batters caught on to his delivery, his effectiveness waned a bit in 1997, although he still went 14–12, joining Dwight Gooden as the only other pitcher to strike out at least 200 batters in each of his first three seasons.

=== 1998–2000 ===
Nomo pitched poorly in 1998, starting the season 2–7, and was dealt to the New York Mets. His performance did not improve and he was released that season. In 1999, he signed with the Chicago Cubs and made three starts for their Triple-A minor league team before refusing to make further starts in the minors, and received a contract with the Milwaukee Brewers, where he went 12–8 with a 4.54 ERA. He reached the 1,000 strikeout mark in 1999, the third fastest in major league history. The Brewers waived him after contract issues and the Philadelphia Phillies claimed him, then granted him free agency only 24 hours later after more contract issues. Finally signed by the Detroit Tigers in 2000, he went 8–12 with a 4.74 ERA and was again released.

=== 2001–2003 ===
Nomo signed with the Boston Red Sox in 2001 and started the season in spectacular fashion, throwing his second no-hitter in his Sox debut, on April 4, against the Baltimore Orioles, walking three and striking out 11. This no-hitter was the first in the 10-year history of Oriole Park at Camden Yards and made Nomo the first Red Sox to pitch a no-hitter since Dave Morehead in 1965. Nomo also became just the fourth player in baseball history to have thrown a no-hitter in both leagues (joining Cy Young, Jim Bunning and Nolan Ryan; Randy Johnson later joined them, becoming the fifth player after throwing a perfect game in 2004). It was the earliest, calendar-wise, that a Major League Baseball no-hitter had been pitched until Ronel Blanco of the Houston Astros threw a no-hitter on April 1, 2024. Nomo also led the league in strikeouts for the first time since his first season in MLB.

A free agent after the end of the year, Nomo returned to the Dodgers in 2002. He had his best season since 1996, posting a 16–6 record, 193 strikeouts, and 3.39 ERA. The following year, he had another strong season, going 16–13 with 177 K and a 3.09 ERA. During September 2003, however, he began to exhibit signs of injury and fatigue.

=== 2004–2008 ===
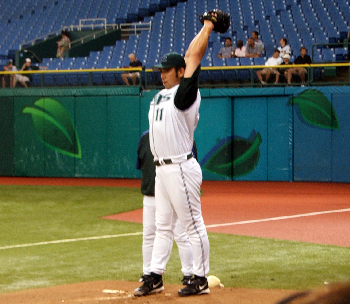
Nomo pitching for Tampa Bay in 2005

Nomo began to struggle again in 2004. After undergoing shoulder surgery in October 2003, he was benched after going 4–11 with an 8.25 ERA for the Dodgers (the worst ERA in the history of baseball for a player with at least 15 decisions in a season).

Before the start of spring training for 2005, he signed a $800,000 contract with the Tampa Bay Devil Rays. The contract also included a $700,000 incentive that kicked in if Nomo started 20 games. The stipulation was allegedly included because Devil Rays upper management was unsure if Nomo had fully recovered from his injury. After a poor start in which he posted a 7.24 ERA, he was released on July 25. Coincidentally or not, this was two days before he was slated to make his twentieth major league start. On July 27, Nomo was picked up off waivers by the New York Yankees, who signed him to a minor league contract, but never recalled him. Nomo was signed to a minor league contract by the Chicago White Sox during spring training in 2006 to play for the Triple-A Charlotte Knights of the International League, but the White Sox released him on June 7 of that year.

In 2007, Nomo signed on with the Leones del Caracas of the Venezuelan Winter League, managed by his former catcher, Carlos Hernández. His participation in the Venezuelan league was viewed as a first step toward an eventual Major League comeback. He made his debut on October 20, 2007, against Tiburones de La Guaira. Nomo pitched one inning, allowing one hit and no runs.

On January 4, 2008, Nomo signed a minor league contract for 2008 with the Kansas City Royals. If added to the roster Nomo would have received a $600,000 one-year contract and the chance to earn $100,000 in performance bonuses. On April 5, his contract was bought by the Royals, and he was added to the 25-man roster. On April 10, Nomo made his first major league appearance since 2005, facing the New York Yankees in relief to start the seventh inning of a game the Yankees were leading 4–1. Nomo loaded the bases, but was able to retire his countryman Hideki Matsui to strand all three runners. But he surrendered back-to-back homers to Alex Rodriguez and Jorge Posada in the ninth inning. On April 20, Nomo was designated for assignment. The Royals released him on April 29. On July 17, Nomo officially retired from Major League Baseball.

Nomo earned 123 wins in the Major Leagues and 78 in Japan, winning his 200th overall game on June 15, 2005. Nomo's success helped inspire other stars from Japan such as Ichiro Suzuki, Hideki Matsui, and Daisuke Matsuzaka to come over to the States as well. In addition, Nomo is one of only five players to pitch at least one no-hitter in both the National League and American League in Major League Baseball history. He has, to date, thrown the only no-hitters at Oriole Park at Camden Yards and at Coors Field.

== Post-playing career ==
Nomo was elected to the Japanese Baseball Hall of Fame in 2014, only the third ever to be selected in their first year of eligibility. At the time, he was also the youngest player ever elected to that Hall of Fame, although his record was broken in 2018 by Hideki Matsui. Nomo became eligible for the National Baseball Hall of Fame on the 2014 ballot, though he only received 6 votes (1.1% of the vote out of the 5% necessary to stay eligible and 75% to be inducted) and fell off the ballot.

Prior to the 2016 season, the San Diego Padres hired Nomo as Advisor for Baseball Operations, to assist the club with player development and expand their international profile. David Bednar has said that he learned his splitter from Nomo.

== Playing style ==
With an overhand delivery, Nomo threw a fastball topping out at 95 mph and a forkball as his primary pitches.

Nomo was known for his signature windup, known as "The Tornado". He began by slowly raising his arms high above his head before lifting his front leg and twisting his torso until his back faced home plate. Then, he hurtled toward the plate with an explosive delivery that featured the same arm speed for all his pitches.

== In popular culture ==
During his time with the Los Angeles Dodgers, Nomo found commercial success in the States. He had a signature sneaker, the Air Max Nomo, produced by Nike in 1996. Also, he appeared on a Segata Sanshiro commercial for the Sega Saturn in 1997.

A song about Nomo, "There's No One Like Nomo", performed by Jack Sheldon, written by Marvin Hamlisch and Alan and Marilyn Bergman, was released by GNP Crescendo Records (GNPD 1406) in 1996.

Nomo has been referenced in hip-hop lyrics by rappers such as Pusha T and Wale. Action Bronson has a track named after Nomo.

Professional wrestler Mitsuhide Hirasawa adopted the ring name Hideo Saito, partially in homage to Nomo.

== See also ==
- Eiji Sawamura Award
- List of Boston Red Sox no-hitters
- List of Los Angeles Dodgers no-hitters
- List of Major League Baseball annual shutout leaders
- List of Major League Baseball career strikeout leaders
- List of Major League Baseball no-hitters
- List of Major League Baseball players from Japan
- Los Angeles Dodgers award winners and league leaders

Awards and achievements
Preceded by Dwight Gooden; Eric Milton	No-hitter pitcher September 17, 1996; April 4, 2001	Succeeded by Kevin Brown; A. J. Burnett
Preceded by Kevin Brown	Los Angeles Dodgers Opening Day; Starting pitcher 2003–2004	Succeeded by Derek Lowe
