= Kazuma Okamoto =

Japanese baseball player (born 1996)

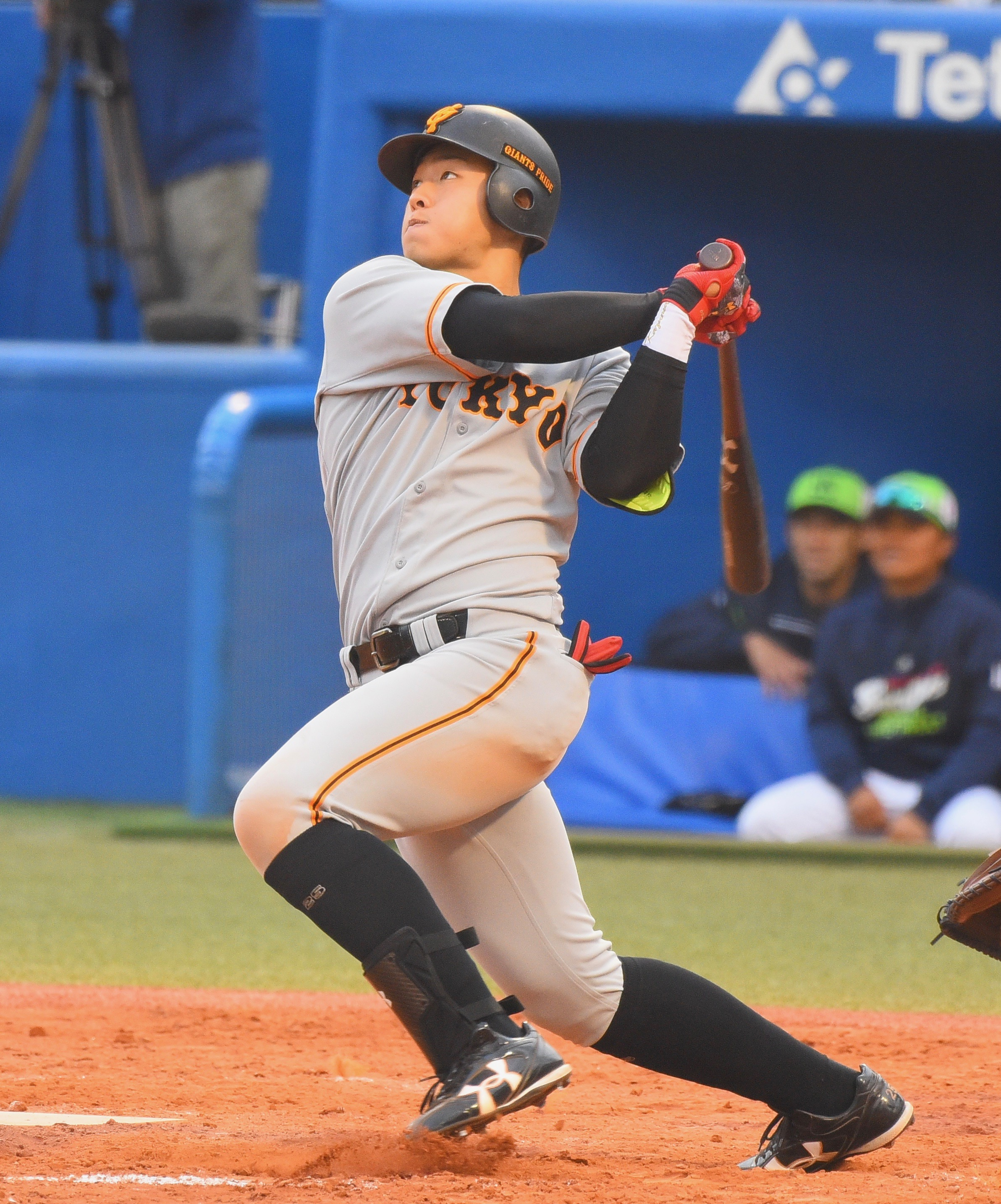
- Okamoto with the Yomiuri Giants in 2018

Toronto Blue Jays – No. 7
- Infielder
- Born: June 30, 1996 (age 30); Gojō, Nara, Japan
- Bats: Right Throws: Right

Professional debut
- NPB: August 28, 2015, for the Yomiuri Giants
- MLB: March 27, 2026, for the Toronto Blue Jays

NPB statistics (through 2025 season)
- Batting average: .277
- Home runs: 248
- Runs batted in: 717

MLB statistics (through 2026 season)
- Batting average: .232
- Home runs: 33
- Runs batted in: 92
- Stats at Baseball Reference

Teams
- Yomiuri Giants (2015–2025); Toronto Blue Jays (2026–present)

Career highlights and awards
- 6× NPB All-Star (2018–2019, 2021–2024); Central League Climax Series MVP (2019); 3× Central League home run leader (2020, 2021, 2023); 2× Central League RBI leader (2020, 2021); 3× Mitsui Golden Glove Award (2021, 2022, 2024); Hochi Professional Sports Award (2018); Tokyo Dome MVP Special Award (2018)
Medals
Men's baseball
Representing Japan
World Baseball Classic
Gold medal – first place	2023 Miami	Team
WBSC Premier12
Silver medal – second place	2024	Team

Kazuma Okamoto (岡本 和真, Okamoto Kazuma; born June 30, 1996), is a Japanese professional baseball infielder for the Toronto Blue Jays of Major League Baseball (MLB). He has previously played in Nippon Professional Baseball (NPB) for the Yomiuri Giants from 2015 to 2025, until moving to North America in 2026.

== Early life ==
Okamoto was born on June 30, 1996 in Gojō, Nara, Japan to Yoshikiyo and Tomoyomi. Both of his parents lacked experience playing baseball. Okamoto began playing catch with his older brother at around the age of three, and joined his first baseball team when he joined elementary school. By third grade, he was able to throw a fastball that peaked at 99 km/h (62 mph). From fourth grade to sixth grade, Okamoto was a pitcher and infielder, and batted cleanup for his little league team. In junior high school, Okamoto was able to throw pitches at 135 km/h (84 mph), standing 180 cm (5 ft 10 in) tall and weighed 83 kg (182 lbs).

== Amateur career ==
=== High school ===
Okamoto attended Chiben Gakuen for high school. He had planned to attend Chiben Gakuen since he was young, hoping to play in the Koshien for one of the most prestigious schools in his area. He began his first year on the bench but became the team's cleanup hitter by fall. He hit eight home runs in his first year, with Chiben Gakuen losing in the Nara prefectural tournament. In his second year of high school, Okamoto hit 48 home runs.

In 2014, Okamoto first played in the Spring Koshien in his third and final year of high school. On his debut, Okamoto became the 19th player in the tournament's history to hit two home runs in a single game. Chiben Gakuen fell in the second round of the tournament to Sano Nichidai. In the 2014 Nara prefectural tournament, Okamoto went 10-for-18, with three home runs. In that year's Summer Koshien, Chiben Gakuen lost in their first round matchup, with Okamoto recording two hits and one run batted in (RBI). He finished his high school career with 73 home runs.

== Professional career ==
=== Yomiuri Giants ===
Okamoto was selected by the Yomiuri Giants in the first round of the 2014 Nippon Professional Baseball Draft. After being drafted, Okamoto signed a contract worth 12 million yen annually, with an 80 million yen signing bonus.

Okamoto made his Nippon Professional Baseball (NPB) debut with the Yomiuri Giants in 2015. He was selected as an NPB all-star six times, and was named the Central League Climax Series MVP in 2019. In 2020, he led the Central League in home runs and runs batted in (RBI).

His nickname, "The Young General", was given to him and was adapted from his former manager, Tatsunori Hara.

During the 2025 Nippon Professional Baseball season, Okamoto only played 69 games and hit 15 home runs, missing half the games after an elbow injury from colliding with another player. Before that, from 2018-2024, he had consistently hit 25 homers or more. Okamoto has also led his league in home runs in three seasons.

=== Toronto Blue Jays ===
==== 2026 ====
During the 2025-26 offseason, the Giants posted Okamoto to Major League Baseball. On January 4, 2026, the Toronto Blue Jays signed Okamoto to a four-year, $60 million contract. During his introductory press conference, Okamoto said that in addition to Toronto being a title contender as a reason for signing, he had asked his daughter to choose her favourite logo from among all the MLB teams, and she had picked out the Jays logo. He hit his first home run against the Athletics on March 29, in a 5–2 win. He was awarded the American League Rookie of the Month for June after hitting .286/.353/.560 with 15 runs, 7 home runs, and 20 RBI.

Against the Kansas City Royals on September 5, Okamoto had his first four-hit game.

Against the Athletics on September 9, Okamoto set the Blue Jays single-season record for strikeouts by a hitter.

== International career ==
Okamoto is also a member of the Japan national baseball team. He participated in the 2018 MLB Japan All-Star Series and Japan's 2019 exhibition series against Mexico.

Okamoto played for Japan at the 2014 Under-18 Asian Baseball Championship.

At the 2023 World Baseball Classic (WBC), Okamoto was a key part of Japan's championship win, scoring two runs and hitting a solo home run in the final against the United States.

Okamoto played for Japan again at the 2026 WBC. He had four hits in five games as Japan lost in the quarterfinals to eventual champion Venezuela.

== Personal life ==
Okamoto has a wife and a daughter.

Okamoto grew up in Nara as a fan of the Hanshin Tigers.

Okamoto is a fan of Japanese rock group Southern All Stars, and listens to frontman Keisuke Kuwata's radio show on Tokyo FM. He has used the Southern All Stars song "Kibo No Wadachi" as his walk-up song since his time with the Yomiuri Giants. He is also a fan of K-pop group TWICE.

In 2023, Okamoto was appointed as a tourism ambassador for his hometown of Gojō.

== See also ==
- List of Major League Baseball players from Japan

Awards
Preceded by Munetaka Murakami	American League Rookie of the Month; June 2026	Succeeded by Chase DeLauter
