= Taisei Ota =

Japanese baseball player (born 1999)

Taisei Ota 大勢
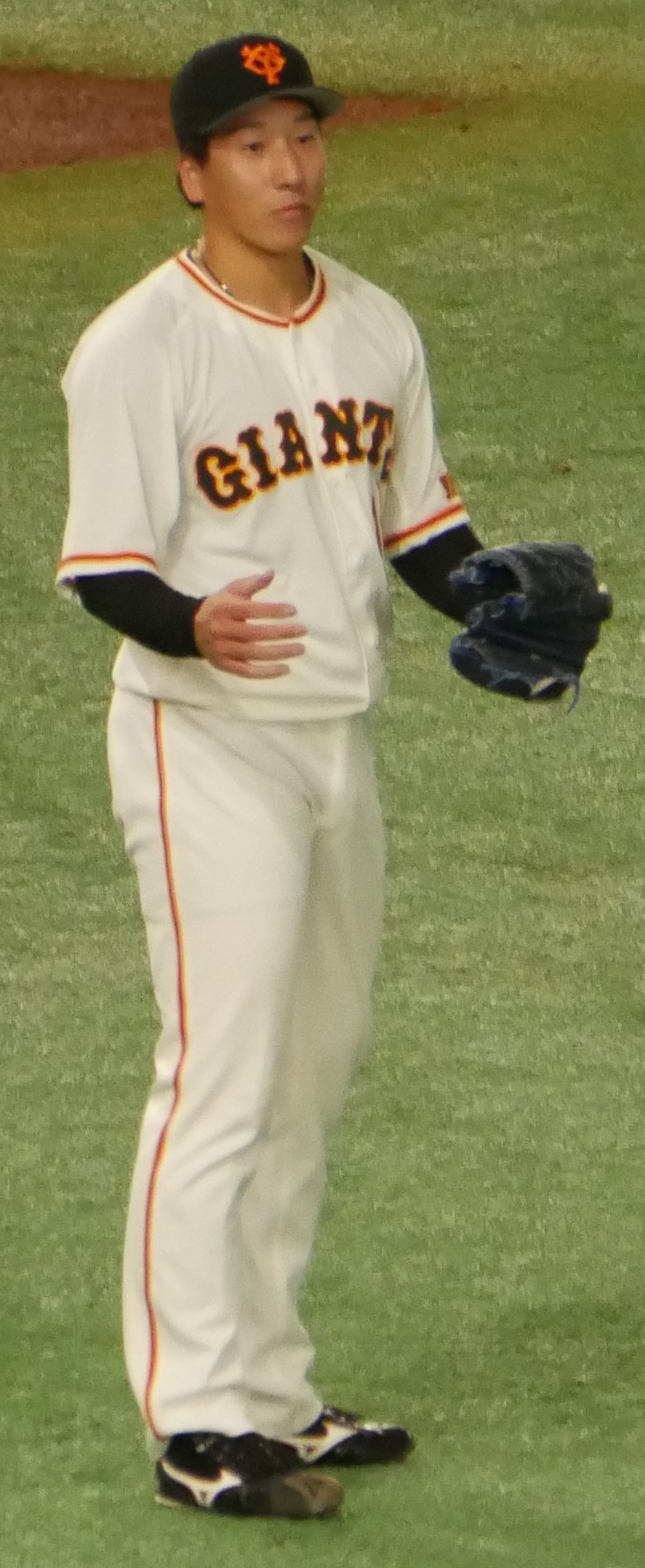

Yomiuri Giants – No. 15
- Pitcher
- Born: June 29, 1999 (age 27); Taka, Hyōgo, Japan
- Bats: Right Throws: Right

NPB debut
- March 25, 2022, for the Yomiuri Giants

Career statistics (through 2025)
- Win–loss record: 13–9
- Earned run average: 2.16
- Strikeouts: 208
- Saves: 81
- Stats at Baseball Reference

Teams
- Yomiuri Giants (2022–present)

Career highlights and awards
- 2× NPB All-Star (2022, 2025); Central League Rookie of the Year (2022); Central League Most Valuable Setup pitcher (2025)
Medals
Men's baseball
Representing Japan
World Baseball Classic
Gold medal – first place	2023 Miami	Team
WBSC Premier12
Silver medal – second place	2024	Team

Taisei Ota (翁田 大勢, Ota Taisei; born June 29, 1999) also known as Taisei (大勢) is a Japanese professional baseball pitcher for the Yomiuri Giants of Nippon Professional Baseball (NPB). He is the first Japanese player to use first name for primary display in the Yomiuri Giants.

== Career ==
On September 10, 2023, while pitching for Yomiuri's farm team, Taisei combined with Haruto Inoue to no-hit the Tokyo Yakult Swallows farm team. The no-hitter was the first combined no-hitter in the history of the farm team.

== International career ==
Taisei represented Japan at the 2023 World Baseball Classic.
