= Sōsuke Genda =

Japanese baseball player (born 1993)

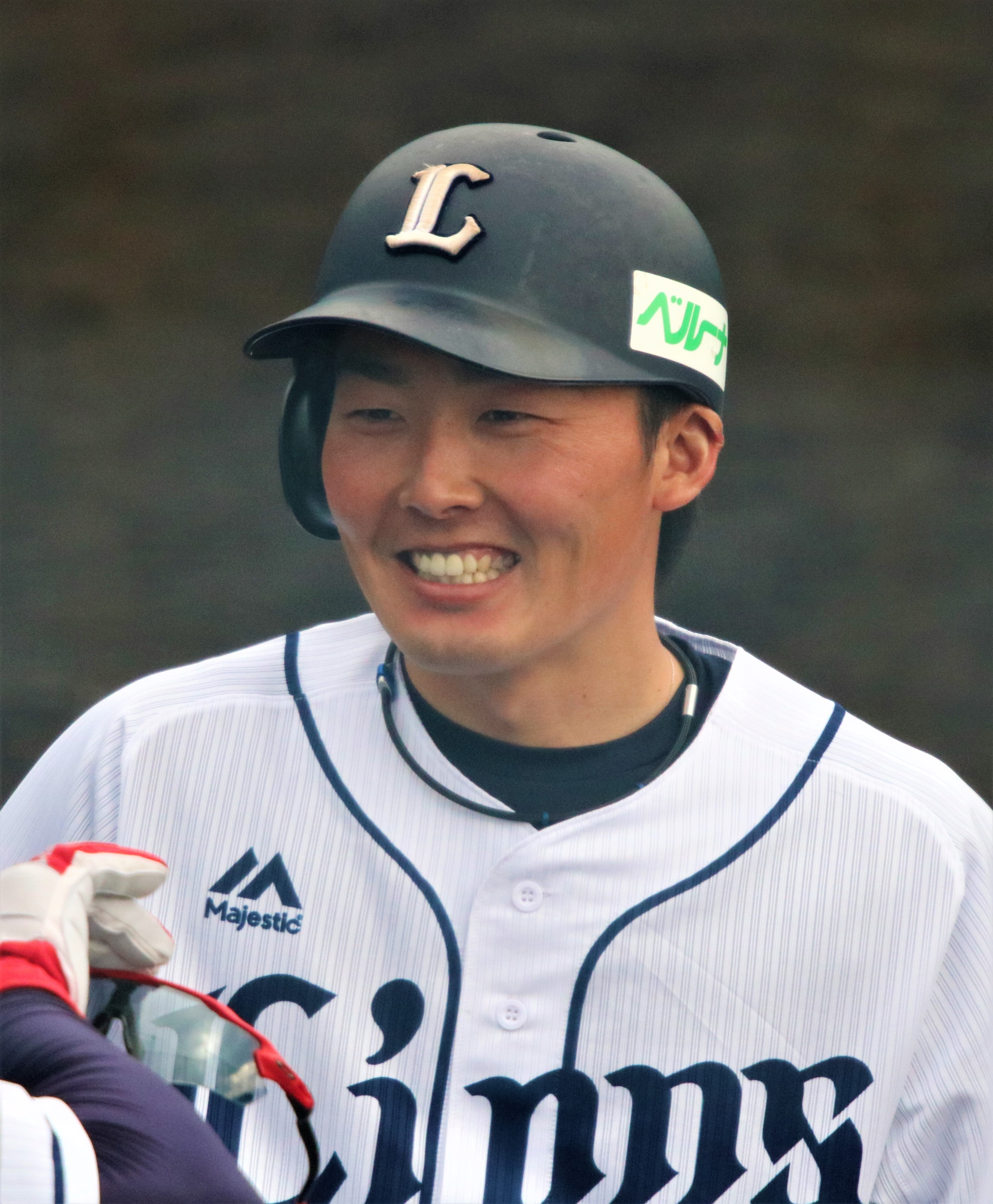

Saitama Seibu Lions – No. 6
- Infielder
- Born: February 16, 1993 (age 33); Ōita, Ōita, Japan
- Bats: Left Throws: Right

NPB debut
- March 31, 2017, for the Saitama Seibu Lions

NPB statistics (through 2024 season)
- Batting average: .269
- Hits: 1,067
- Home runs: 17
- Runs batted in: 265
- Stolen bases: 172
- Stats at Baseball Reference

Teams
- Saitama Seibu Lions (2017–present)

Career highlights and awards
- 6× NPB All-Star (2017–2019, 2021, 2023, 2024); 2017 Pacific League Rookie of the Year; 7× Pacific League Golden Glove Award (2018–2024); 4× Best Nine Award (2018–2021)
Medals
Men's baseball
Representing Japan
Summer Olympics
Gold medal – first place	2020 Tokyo	Team
World Baseball Classic
Gold medal – first place	2023 Miami	Team
WBSC Premier12
Gold medal – first place	2019 Tokyo	Team
Silver medal – second place	2024	Team

Sōsuke Genda (源田 壮亮, Genda Sōsuke; born February 16, 1993) is a Japanese professional baseball infielder for the Saitama Seibu Lions of Nippon Professional Baseball (NPB).

== Career ==
He won Pacific League Rookie of the Year in 2017. He was named as Best Nine and won Golden Glove Award in 2018.

He was selected for the 2018 NPB All-Star Game.

== International career ==
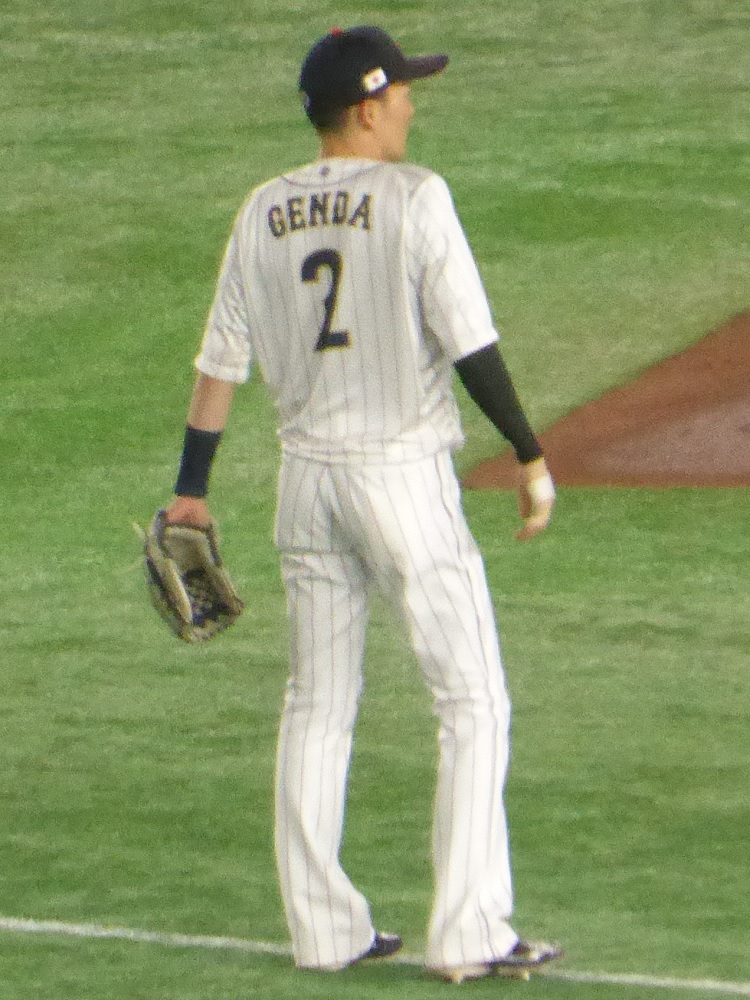
Genda with the WBC Japan national team at Tokyo Dome on March 16, 2023

Genda represented the Japan national baseball team in the 2017 Asia Professional Baseball Championship, 2018 MLB Japan All-Star Series and 2019 WBSC Premier12.

On October 10, 2018, Genda was selected Japan national baseball team at the 2018 MLB Japan All-Star Series.

On October 1, 2019, Genda was selected at the 2019 WBSC Premier12.

On January 16, 2026, Genda was selected to play in the 2026 World Baseball Classic.

== Personal life ==
In October 2019, Genda married actress, tarento, and former Nogizaka46 member Misa Etō, whom he met when she interviewed him for a professional sports news program. They have three children: a son born in January 2022, a daughter born in December 2023, and a second son born in August 2026. .
