= Munetaka Murakami =

Japanese baseball player (born 2000)

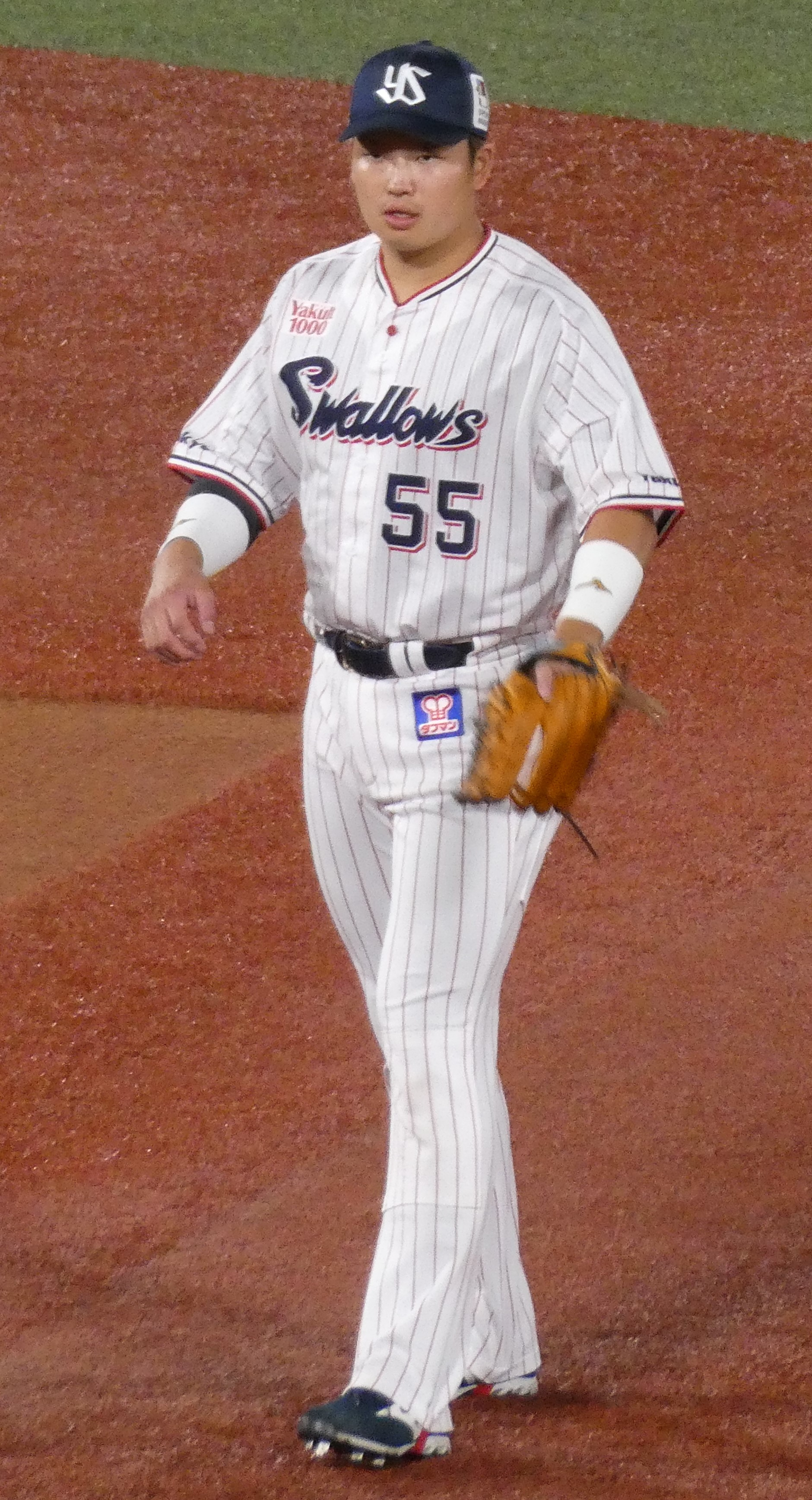
- Murakami with the Tokyo Yakult Swallows

Chicago White Sox – No. 5
- First baseman / Third baseman
- Born: February 2, 2000 (age 26); Kumamoto, Kumamoto Prefecture, Japan
- Bats: Left Throws: Right

Professional debut
- NPB: September 16, 2018, for the Tokyo Yakult Swallows
- MLB: March 26, 2026, for the Chicago White Sox

NPB statistics (through 2025 season)
- Batting average: .270
- Home runs: 246
- Runs batted in: 647

MLB statistics (through 2026 season)
- Batting average: .207
- Home runs: 35
- Runs batted in: 77
- Stats at Baseball Reference

Teams
- Tokyo Yakult Swallows (2018–2025); Chicago White Sox (2026–present)

Career highlights and awards
- NPB: 4× All-Star (2019, 2021, 2022, 2024); Japan Series champion (2021); 2× Central League MVP (2021, 2022); Central League Rookie of the Year (2019); Triple Crown (2022); 3× Best Nine Award (2020, 2021, 2022); 2× Central League home run leader (2021, 2022); Interleague play MVP (2022); Hochi Professional Sports Award (2019); MLB: All-Star (2026)
Medals
Men's baseball
Representing Japan
Summer Olympics
Gold medal – first place	2020 Tokyo	Team
World Baseball Classic
Gold medal – first place	2023 Miami	Team

Munetaka Murakami (村上 宗隆, Murakami Munetaka; born February 2, 2000) is a Japanese professional baseball infielder for the Chicago White Sox of Major League Baseball (MLB). He has previously played in Nippon Professional Baseball (NPB) for the Tokyo Yakult Swallows. His NPB nickname, "Murakami-sama", was given by fans because his feats at the plate could only be done by a kami-sama, or "god." His nickname was Japan's word of the year for 2022.

== Amateur career ==
Murakami started playing baseball at age of five. He entered Kyushū Gakuin Integrated High School, where he became their team's starting first baseman and cleanup hitter. Kyushū Gakuin qualified for the 2015 Koshien in Murakami's first year but were defeated in the first round. He then played catcher in his second and third years, but they did not make it to any national tournaments. He hit a total of 52 home runs in high school, and his slugging prowess earned him the nickname "Babe Ruth of Higo", Higo being the former name of Kumamoto Prefecture.

== Professional career ==
=== Tokyo Yakult Swallows ===
Despite not getting a lot of media exposure from appearances in national games, Murakami was drafted in the first round of the 2017 NPB Draft by the Tokyo Yakult Swallows, Yomiuri Giants and the Tohoku Rakuten Golden Eagles, as an alternative pick after they lost Kōtarō Kiyomiya to the Nippon Ham Fighters. The Swallows won the lottery, and signed him for a contract of 80 million yen and a 7.2 million yen annual salary. He was assigned jersey number 55.

==== 2018 ====
Murakami spent most of the season playing in Eastern League (minors) games. He batted at .311 in 28 games until the end of April, with 3 home runs and 20 RBI. In June, he got awarded League MVP of the month for batting .315 and driving in 14 runs, last accomplished by a Swallows rookie in 2011 by Tetsuto Yamada. He also got voted into the Fresh All Star games in July. Murakami continued to play well in the following months, and finally got the chance to play in the main squad on the September 16 game against the Hiroshima Carp. He debuted as the starting third baseman, and hit a home run in his first at-bat. But after failing to record a hit in his next 5 appearances, he was sent back to the farm and ended the season there. He finished with a batting average of .288, 17 home runs, 70 RBIs and 16 stolen bases in the minors. After the season, he won both the Eastern League MVP and Rookie of the Year awards and was given a 800,000 yen pay rise, bringing his annual salary to 8 million yen.

==== 2019 ====
2019 was Murakami's breakout season. On February 27, he was selected to play for the Japan national baseball team at the 2019 exhibition games against Mexico. His great performance during the preseason exhibition games earned him the third base spot in the season-opener. This made him the youngest Swallows player to start in the season opening game at 19 years old, beating the previous record of 21 year-old Seikichi Nishioka in 1958. He hit his 10th home run by May 10, and managed to secure the cleanup position by May 12. He got voted into his first All-Star Game in July where he got top votes for third base, and was also selected for the Home Run Derby showdown. On August 12, he hit his first walk-off home run against the Yokohama DeNA BayStars and became the youngest NPB player to achieve this feat. He hit his 30th home run by August 22, and became the first Central League player drafted out of high school to notch at least 30 home runs within 2 years from his debut. On September 4, he broke the NPB RBI record of high school-drafted players in their second season by notching his 87th RBI. He was the only Swallows player to appear in all of the team's 143 games, and despite batting only .231, he topped the team in home runs with 36 which tied the NPB home-run record for second-year rookies, and finished second in RBI with 96. He also set a record for most strikeouts for a Japanese player with 184. His performance earned him the 2019 CL Rookie of the Year Award, and a 37 million yen pay rise which more than quadrupled his previous salary to 45 million yen.

==== 2021 ====
Murakami won the Central League MVP award following the 2021 season by hitting the league-leading 39 home runs, driving in 112 RBIs and drawing 106 walks while slashed .278/.408/.566. In the Japan Series, Murakami hit two home runs to help the Tokyo Yakult Swallows capture their first title after 20 years.

==== 2022 ====
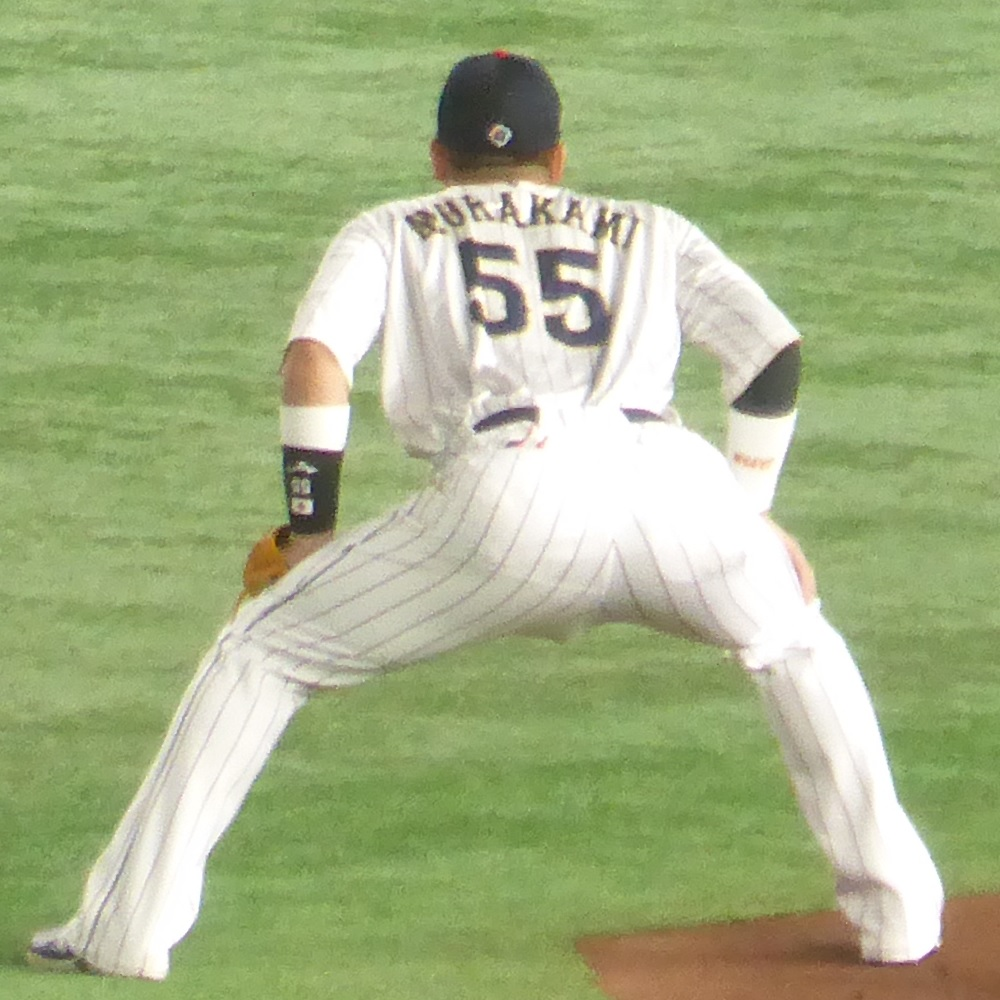
Murakami with the WBC Japan national team at Tokyo Dome on March 16, 2023

In 2022, Murakami became the first NPB player to hit a home run in five consecutive plate appearances, spanning two games. On September 13, Murakami hit his 55th home run of the season, tying Sadaharu Oh for the most home runs by a Japanese player in a season, and for second in NPB overall, alongside Alex Cabrera, Tuffy Rhodes, and Oh. Unfortunately for Murakami, he would go on a slump, going 48 straight at-bats without a home run, but on the final day of the regular season, on October 3, 2022, Murakami would hit his 56th home run of the season, breaking Oh's record for the most home runs by a Japanese-born player. He also became the first person who plays offense to win the NPB Triple Crown since Nobuhiko Matsunaka of the Fukuoka Daiei Hawks in 2004, and the first by a Central League player since Randy Bass of the Hanshin Tigers in 1986, and the youngest player to win the Triple Crown, at 22 years, eight months, and one day old at the conclusion of the 2022 regular season. He then proceeded to win the Central League MVP in a unanimous vote, becoming the first player since Masahiro Tanaka in 2013 and the first position player since Sadaharu Oh in 1977 to win the MVP ballot unanimously.

==== 2023–2025 ====
After the 2022 season, Murakami signed a three-year contract extension worth 600 million yen per year, which stipulated that the Swallows had to post him to Major League Baseball (MLB) after the 2025 season.

Murakami was not as productive in 2023 and 2024. His batting average fell from .318 in 2022 to .256 in 2023 and .244 in 2024. His strikeout and walk rates also worsened: his strikeout rate went from 21% to 28% to 30% while his walk rate dropped from 19.3% in 2022 to 14.3% in 2025.

In 2025, Murakami suffered an oblique injury in spring training. He returned to the Swallows on April 17, but re-aggravated his oblique upon his return. He returned again to the Swallows on July 29. Murakami played in 65 games during 2025 season, slashing .273/.379/.663 with 22 HRs and 47 RBIs.

Per his contract, Murakami was officially posted to MLB on November 7, 2025. A 45-day negotiating window began on November 8.

=== Chicago White Sox ===
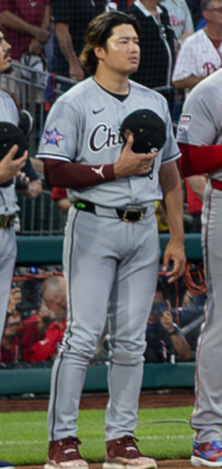
Murakami at the 2026 MLB All-Star Game

On December 21, 2025, Murakami signed a two-year, $34 million contract with the Chicago White Sox. Murakami made his MLB debut on March 26, 2026. During the opening series, Murakami became the first player in White Sox history and fourth player in MLB history to homer in each of the first three games of their career. On April 17, he hit his first major league grand slam over the batter's eye at Sutter Health Park, the temporary home of the Athletics. On May 1, he led the majors with 13 home runs. He hit his first MLB double on May 4 after 14 previous home runs, setting the record for most home runs hit to begin a career before hitting a double or triple. On May 30, Murakami was placed on the 10-day injured list due to a right hamstring strain.

On July 10, Murakami was named to the American League All Star Team, as a replacement for Minnesota Twins outfielder Byron Buxton. He also competed in the 2026 Home Run Derby but was eliminated in the first round after failing to hit enough home runs to advance.

When the White Sox won the Wild Card Series against the Houston Astros on September 30, Murakami celebrated and said "I'm drunk! Yesterday, maybe hungover. No, not yesterday, tomorrow. Sorry, I don't speak English." Murakami also pointed to his translator and said "Yeah, he's drunk! He's drunk!" His "I'm drunk!" interview went viral quickly in both the United States and Japan.

In Game 1 of the American League Division Series, Murakami hit a two-run home run off of Cleveland Guardians pitcher Tanner Bibee in the top of the fourth inning to give the White Sox a 2-0 lead. The home run was the hardest hit in the 2026 postseason at the time, leaving the bat at 112 miles an hour, according to announcers on TBS.

== International career ==
Murakami represented Japan in the Tokyo 2020 Olympics (held in 2021), with the host team winning the gold medal.

Murakami played for Japan in the 2023 World Baseball Classic (WBC). After struggling during most of the tournament and going 0-for-4 with 3 strikeouts in the semifinal against Mexico, Murakami hit a walk-off two-run double to help Japan prevail 6–5. In the final against the defending champion United States, Murakami led off the bottom of the second inning with a first-pitch home run off Merrill Kelly to tie the game. Japan went on to win the championship game 3–2, claiming its third WBC title.

Murakami joined team Japan again for the 2026 WBC. He hit a grand slam against Czechia in pool play, before Japan lost to Venezuela, the eventual tournament champions, in the knockout stage.

Awards
Preceded by Kevin McGonigle	American League Rookie of the Month; May 2026	Succeeded by Kazuma Okamoto
