= 2020 CPBL season =

31st CPBL season
- League: Chinese Professional Baseball League
- Sport: Baseball
- Duration: April 12 – November 8, 2020
- Games: 60 (each half season, each team)
- Teams: 5 Wei Chuan Dragons (minor league)
- TV partner(s): MOMOTV; Eleven Sports; Videoland Television Network; ELTA TV

First half-season
- Season champions: CTBC Brothers

Second half-season
- Season champions: Uni-President Lions

Taiwan Series
- Champions: Uni-President Lions
- Finals MVP: Pan Wu-hsiung

CPBL seasons
- ← 2019 2021 →

The 2020 Chinese Professional Baseball League season was the 31st season of the Chinese Professional Baseball League (CPBL). The season was scheduled to begin on 14 March, earlier than previous seasons in order to free up time for the CPBL players to participate in the final qualifying tournament of the 2020 Summer Olympics. However, due to the COVID-19 pandemic, opening day was delayed. On 1 April, the CPBL announced that the season would begin on 11 April with the rematch of last season's Taiwan Series teams: the champions Rakuten Monkeys hosting the CTBC Brothers, but behind closed doors with no fans attending.

Due to inclement weather, game #1 and #2 hosted by Monkeys were postponed. This led to game #3, the CTBC Brothers hosting the Uni-President Lions on April 12 at Taichung Intercontinental Baseball Stadium, becoming the first game of the season to play to completion. On May 8, a maximum of 1,000 fans were permitted to attend games. Restrictions were further relaxed on June 5: as long as there was one-seat spacing between spectators, attendance number was no longer restricted, and masks were no longer required while seated; food prepared on-site was again allowed.

The CPBL received international coverage because other major baseball leagues such as Major League Baseball in North America, Nippon Professional Baseball in Japan, and the KBO League in South Korea were still severely impacted by the virus outbreak and unable to confirm the dates of their respective season openings. The first-ever English broadcast of CPBL games also attracted international attention.

The annual CPBL All-Star Game was cancelled for the first time to accommodate to the compact schedule. The season concluded on 8 November with the Uni-President Lions winning the seasonal championship, by defeating the CTBC Brothers in Game 7 of the Taiwan Series with a score of 7:4.

== Competition ==
Four teams, the Rakuten Monkeys, Uni-President Lions, Fubon Guardians, and CTBC Brothers will contest the CPBL, the highest level of professional baseball played in Taiwan. The season is divided into two halves, with each team playing 60 games in each half. The winners for each half-season plus the non-winner with the best overall record will qualify for the playoffs. In the event that the same team wins both halves, the next 2 teams with the best overall records will advance.

In May 2019, commissioner John Wu announced that the CPBL had reached an agreement with Ting Hsin International Group, largest and managing shareholder of Wei Chuan Foods Corporation, to reactivate Wei Chuan Dragons. The Dragons would participate in the minor league during 2020 season and expected to return to the major league in 2021.

During first-half season, it was discovered that the coefficient of restitution (COR) of the official game baseball had an average of 0.573 between two tests, above the 0.550~0.570 target only below the 0.540~0.580 rejection limit, resulting in faster ball-batted speed and high homerun production. After the May General Managers meeting, the League decided to tighten quality control of the official game baseball, with COR of 0.560 as the target. On the test conducted in July, the COR was 0.563, meeting the new requirements. This had resulted in less offense-centric and more balanced games in the second-half season.

== Broadcast rights ==
Following a dispute between the CPBL and MP & Silva during the 2014 CPBL season, broadcast rights to CPBL games were acquired over the intervening seasons by Eleven Sports, ELTA TV, MOMOTV, and Videoland Television Network. English-language broadcasts were added on a trial basis and streamed via the Twitter account of Eleven Sports Taiwan. A number of international fans tuned in, and all CPBL teams subsequently announced that they would feature English commentary.

== Standings ==
=== First half standings ===
The CTBC Brothers claimed the first half Championship on July 14, by defeating Uni-President Lions with a score of 6:1 in the resumption of game #62, which was suspended on May 26 at top of third inning with a score of 1:0 due to rain.

Team	G	W	T	L	Pct.	GB
CTBC Brothers	60	37	0	23	0.617	--
Rakuten Monkeys	60	34	0	26	0.567	3.0
Uni-President Lions	60	26	0	34	0.433	11.0
Fubon Guardians	60	23	0	37	0.383	14.0

=== Second half standings ===
The Uni-President Lions clinched the second-half Championship on October 24 at the last regular season game, by defeating CTBC Brothers with the score of 3:2 in the resumption of game #193. Game #193, hosted by Lions at their homefield Tainan Municipal Baseball Stadium, was suspended on September 12 at the top of Third inning after one out due to rain, with the score tied at 1:1. This was Lions' first half-season Championship since the 2013 second-half Championship.

Team	G	W	T	L	Pct.	GB
Uni-President Lions	60	32	1	27	0.542	--
Fubon Guardians	60	31	1	28	0.525	1.0
CTBC Brothers	60	30	2	28	0.517	1.5
Rakuten Monkeys	60	25	0	35	0.417	7.5

=== Final season standings ===
Team	G	W	T	L	Pct.	GB
CTBC Brothers	120	67	2	51	0.568	--
Rakuten Monkeys	120	59	0	61	0.492	9.0
Uni-President Lions	120	58	1	61	0.487	9.5
Fubon Guardians	120	54	1	65	0.454	13.5

- Green denotes first-half or second-half champion.
- Bold denotes clinching playoff qualification as the wild card.

== Statistical leaders ==
=== Hitting ===
Stat	Player	Team	Total
HR	Lin An-ko	Uni-President Lions	32
AVG	Chen Chieh-hsien	Uni-President Lions	0.360
H	Chen Chieh-hsien	Uni-President Lions	174
RBIs	Lin An-ko	Uni-President Lions	99
SB	Chen Chen-Wei	Rakuten Monkeys	42

=== Pitching ===
Stat	Player	Team	Total
W	José de Paula	CTBC Brothers	16
ERA	José de Paula	CTBC Brothers	3.20
SO	José de Paula	CTBC Brothers	192
SV	Chen Yun-wen, (Note: Yun-Wen Chen won the seasonal most-saves award by having a better earned-run-average (ERA)) C.C. Lee	Uni-President Lions, CTBC Brothers	23
Hld	Wu Chun-wei	CTBC Brothers	24

== Playoffs ==
Because the first-half and second-half championships were won by different teams, the 2020 Taiwan Series, a best of seven series, was played. The first-half champions, the CTBC Brothers, faced the second-half champions, the Uni-President Lions, with the first game scheduled on October 31 and the seventh game on November 8. The Brothers, by having a better yearly record, earned home field advantage, hosting games 1, 2, 6, and 7 at their home field, Taichung Intercontinental Baseball Stadium. The Lions hosted games 3, 4, and 5 at their home field, Tainan Municipal Baseball Stadium. The two teams last faced off at a playoff series in the 2009 Taiwan Series.

=== Rules ===
All regular season rules apply with the following exceptions:

- Each team is allowed to register 28 players on its active roster.
- No tied games.
- Two outfield umpires are added to the games.

=== Summary ===
Uni-President Lions won the series, 4–3.

Game	Date	Score	Location	Time	Attendance
1	October 31	Uni-President Lions – 4, CTBC Brothers – 2 (10)	Taichung Intercontinental Baseball Stadium	3:47	15,600
2	November 1	Uni-President Lions – 1, CTBC Brothers – 9	Taichung Intercontinental Baseball Stadium	2:59	15,600
3	November 3	CTBC Brothers – 5, Uni-President Lions – 1	Tainan Municipal Baseball Stadium	3:15	7,126
4	November 4	CTBC Brothers – 6, Uni-President Lions – 3	Tainan Municipal Baseball Stadium	4:11	7,800
5	November 5	CTBC Brothers – 0, Uni-President Lions – 6	Tainan Municipal Baseball Stadium	3:03	7,800
6	November 7	Uni-President Lions – 12, CTBC Brothers – 1	Taichung Intercontinental Baseball Stadium	3:58	15,600
7	November 8	Uni-President Lions – 7, CTBC Brothers – 4	Taichung Intercontinental Baseball Stadium	3:59	15,600

=== Game summaries ===
==== Game 1 ====
October 31, 2020 5:05 pm (NST) at Taichung Intercontinental Baseball Stadium in Taichung, Taiwan,
Team	1	2	3	4	5	6	7	8	9	10	R	H	E
Uni-President Lions	0	0	0	0	0	1	0	0	0	3	4	8	0
CTBC Brothers	0	0	0	0	0	1	0	0	0	1	2	8	0
Starting pitchers: Lions: Brock Dykxhoorn; Brothers: Esmil Rogers; WP: Chun-Yen Huang (1–0) LP: Kai-Wen Cheng (0–1) Sv: Chen Yun-wen (1); Home runs: Lions: Pan Wu-hsiung (1); Brothers: None; Attendance: 15,600 (sold-out); Notes: MVP: Wu-Hsiung Pan; Boxscore

==== Game 2 ====
November 1, 2020 5:05 pm (NST) at Taichung Intercontinental Baseball Stadium in Taichung, Taiwan,
Team	1	2	3	4	5	6	7	8	9	R	H	E
Uni-President Lions	0	1	0	0	0	0	0	0	0	1	5	0
CTBC Brothers	0	5	0	0	0	0	0	4	X	9	12	0
Starting pitchers: Lions: Tim Melville; Brothers: José de Paula; WP: José de Paula (1–0) LP: Tim Melville (0–1); Home runs: Lions: None; Brothers: Cheng-Hua Yueh (1), Tung-Hua Yueh (1), Wei-Ta Su (1); Attendance: 15,600; Notes: MVP:José de Paula; Boxscore

==== Game 3 ====
November 3, 2020 6:35 pm (NST) at Tainan Municipal Baseball Stadium in Tainan, Taiwan,
Team	1	2	3	4	5	6	7	8	9	R	H	E
CTBC Brothers	0	0	0	1	0	0	0	0	4	5	11	0
Uni-President Lions	0	1	0	0	0	0	0	0	0	1	3	1
Starting pitchers: Brothers: Ariel Miranda; Lions: Teddy Stankiewicz; WP: Ariel Miranda (1–0) LP: Chun-Yen Huang (1–1); Home runs: Brothers: Chi-Hung Hsu (1); Lions: None; Attendance: 7,126; Notes: MVP:Kun-Yu Chiang; Boxscore

==== Game 4 ====
November 4, 2020 6:35 pm (NST) at Tainan Municipal Baseball Stadium in Tainan, Taiwan,
Team	1	2	3	4	5	6	7	8	9	R	H	E
CTBC Brothers	0	0	0	3	3	0	0	0	0	6	9	1
Uni-President Lions	0	0	0	0	0	0	0	1	2	3	9	1
Starting pitchers: Brothers: En-Sih Huang; Lions: Chen-Yen Chiang; WP: En-Sih Huang (1–0) LP: Chen-Yen Chiang (0–1); Home runs: Brothers: Tzu-Hsien Chan (1); Lions: Fu-Lin Kuo (1), An-Ko Lin (1); Attendance: 7,800; Notes: MVP:Tzu-Hsien Chan; Boxscore

==== Game 5 ====
Down 1-3 in the series, Uni-Lions' starting pitcher Brock Dykxhoorn pitched a complete-game shut-out using 126 pitches. Coupling with timely hits from the bottom-half of the batting order, the Uni-Lions defeated the Brothers with a score of 6:0 in the final home game of the season and forced the series back to Taichung.

November 5, 2020 6:35 pm (NST) at Tainan Municipal Baseball Stadium in Tainan, Taiwan,
Team	1	2	3	4	5	6	7	8	9	R	H	E
CTBC Brothers	0	0	0	0	0	0	0	0	0	0	3	2
Uni-President Lions	0	2	0	0	4	0	0	0	X	6	9	0
Starting pitchers: Brothers: Esmil Rogers; Lions: Brock Dykxhoorn; WP: Brock Dykxhoorn (1–0) LP: Esmil Rogers (0–1); Attendance: 7,800; Notes: MVP:Brock Dykxhoorn; Boxscore

==== Game 6 ====
November 7, 2020 5:05 pm (NST) at Taichung Intercontinental Baseball Stadium in Taichung, Taiwan,
Team	1	2	3	4	5	6	7	8	9	R	H	E
Uni-President Lions	2	0	0	0	2	0	0	8	0	12	12	1
CTBC Brothers	0	0	1	0	0	0	0	0	0	1	7	1
Starting pitchers: Lions: Tim Melville; Brothers: José de Paula; WP: Tim Melville (1–1) LP: José de Paula (1–1); Home runs: Lions: Yung-Chi Chen (1); Brothers: None; Attendance: 15,600; Notes: MVP:Tim Melville; Boxscore

==== Game 7 ====
November 8, 2020 5:05 pm (NST) at Taichung Intercontinental Baseball Stadium in Taichung, Taiwan,
Team	1	2	3	4	5	6	7	8	9	R	H	E
Uni-President Lions	1	1	1	0	0	0	4	0	0	7	10	0
CTBC Brothers	0	0	4	0	0	0	0	0	0	4	11	0
Starting pitchers: Lions: Teddy Stankiewicz; Brothers: Ariel Miranda; WP: Teddy Stankiewicz (1–0) LP: Ariel Miranda (1–1) Sv: Brock Dykxhoorn (1); Home runs: Lions: Chie-Hsien Chen (1); Brothers: None; Attendance: 15,600; Notes: MVP:Chie-Hsien Chen; Boxscore
