= 2021 CPBL season =

32nd CPBL season
- League: Chinese Professional Baseball League
- Sport: Baseball
- Duration: March 13 – November 21
- Games: 60 (each half season, each team)
- Teams: 5
- TV partner(s): MOMO TV; Eleven Sports; Videoland Television Network; ELTA TV

First half-season
- Season champions: CTBC Brothers

Second half-season
- Season champions: Uni-President Lions

Taiwan Series
- Champions: CTBC Brothers
- Finals MVP: Tzu-Hsien Chan

CPBL seasons
- ← 2020 2022 →

The 2021 Chinese Professional Baseball League season was the 32nd season of the Chinese Professional Baseball League, with an official slogan of "United for Baseball".

The re-activated Wei Chuan Dragons rejoined the major league 21 years after disbandment in 1999, marking the first time a CPBL season included more than four teams since the 2008 season. As CPBL Commissioner Wu Chih-yang termed out following the conclusion of the 2020 season, the general managers elected Vice President of the Legislative Yuan Tsai Chi-Chang as the new Commissioner.

The season started on March 13, with the opening game played, per tradition, by the prior season's championship series pair: the 2020 champion Uni-President Lions defeated CTBC Brothers at Tainan Municipal Baseball Stadium, 10–4. The season ended in late November, followed by a Taiwan Series rematch. The Brothers defeated the Lions in a four-game sweep to capture the 2021 championship.

== Game play ==
Seeing the 0.560~0.570 coefficient of restitution (COR) of the 2020 game balls created too much of an offense-leaning game, the General Managers decided on September 24, 2020, to reduce the COR of 2021 game balls to 0.550 and raise the stitch height from 5mm to 7mm. The league hoped that this would restore the balance between pitchers and hitters, and align with balls used by neighboring KBO and NPB leagues.

As COVID-19 pandemic still widespread around the world, the CDC and the League decided to retain restriction first implemented in the second half of 2020 season: the maximum attendance of the game was reduced to 78% of each stadium's seating capacity, but food and drink was allowed.

League-organized pre-season games started on February 26, 2021, and ended on March 10. The regular season opening game played on March 13 at Tainan Municipal Baseball Stadium, with last season's champions Uni-President Lions hosting their 2020 Taiwan Series opponent the CTBC Brothers. Game #2 followed the next day with the Lions hosting the Wei Chuan Dragons at Tainan, this was the first major league game played by the Dragons since their disbandment in 1999.

Game #21 played on March 26 with the Rakuten Monkeys hosting Uni-President Lions at Taoyuan International Baseball Stadium was suspended at the top of the 4th inning after one out due to poor visibility caused by dense fog. This was the first CPBL game to be suspended due to fog, and the second if included called games.

The first-half season schedule was published on February 10, with second-half pending the release of 2020 Summer Olympic Baseball Final Qualifier schedule. Following the finalization of the Final Olympic Baseball Qualifier schedule, which would be held between June 16 and 20 at Taichung Intercontinental Baseball Stadium, the league decided on April 19 to postpone games previously scheduled on and after June 8 to later dates. Due to a recent spike in domestically transmitted coronavirus cases, the league announced on May 19 that it would suspend the season as long as level-3 health alert was in effect across Taiwan. The league considered but decided against resuming games on June 29 without fans in attendance, despite no opposition by the Central Epidemic Command Center to the CPBL's plan. The CBPL stated on July 12 that play could resume the next day, as teams had agreed to a number of preventative measures. These measures included the prohibition of fans and cheerleaders in the stadium, and a requirement for the staffs of all teams to live and remain in hotels, whether at home on the road, unless a game was being played. As the COVID-19 pandemic became less severe, the league allowed a thousand fans to attend games on August 7 and 8. Starting on August 10, fans were permitted to attend games starting August 10, as stadiums were to be filled up to 25 percent capacity. Attendees were required to check in via a QR code, wear masks at all times, and submit to disinfection and body temperature checks at stadium entrances. Though cheerleaders were also permitted to return to the games, bans on musical instruments and food consumption remained in place at the time.

== Milestones ==
- Before the first game of the regular season for the Wei Chuan Dragons, the team invited 326 people to attempt 163 ceremonial first pitches. A new record for simultaneous ceremonial first pitches was set at 156 pitches, as Guinness World Records adjudicators required attempts to be thrown at the same time and caught cleanly.
- Tim Melville (Uni-President Lions) pitched a no-hitter against Wei Chuan Dragons on April 2, and set a league record of 142 pitches thrown in a no-hitter. This was the 10th regular season no-hitter in the league history, the 11th if included post season, fourth in the team history, and the first in Melville's professional career.
- Brock Dykxhoorn (Uni-President Lions) pitched a one-hit minimum batters faced game against Fubon Guardians on April 14. The only base-runner reached on a single in the third inning, but was erased on the next batter's ensuing double play, meaning Dykxhoorn faced only 27 batters.

== Standings ==
=== First half standings ===
Team	G	W	L	T	Pct.	GB
CTBC Brothers	60	35	24	1	0.593	--
Uni-President Lions	60	32	26	2	0.552	2.5
Rakuten Monkeys	60	30	30	0	0.500	5.5
Fubon Guardians	60	28	31	1	0.475	7.0
Wei Chuan Dragons	60	22	36	2	0.379	12.5

=== Second half standings ===
Team	G	W	T	L	Pct.	GB
Uni-President Lions	60	32	3	25	0.561	--
CTBC Brothers	60	31	4	25	0.554	0.5
Wei Chuan Dragons	60	28	1	31	0.475	5.0
Fubon Guardians	60	26	3	31	0.456	6.0
Rakuten Monkeys	60	26	3	31	0.456	6.0

=== Final season standings ===
Team	G	W	T	L	Pct.	GB
CTBC Brothers	120	66	5	49	0.574	--
Uni-President Lions	120	64	5	51	0.557	2.0
Rakuten Monkeys	120	56	3	61	0.479	11.0
Fubon Guardians	120	54	4	62	0.466	12.5
Wei Chuan Dragons	120	50	3	67	0.427	17.0

- Green denotes first-half or second-half champion.
- Bold denotes clinching playoff qualification as the wild card.

== Statistical leaders ==
=== Hitting ===
Stat	Player	Team	Total
HR	Chu Yu-Hsien	Rakuten Monkeys	22
AVG	Chen Chun-Hsiu	Rakuten Monkeys	0.352
H	Wang Wei-Chen	CTBC Brothers	159
RBIs	Chu Yu-Hsien	Rakuten Monkeys	81
SB	Lin Li	Rakuten Monkeys	27

=== Pitching ===
Stat	Player	Team	Total
W	Brock Dykxhoorn	Uni-President Lions	17
ERA	José de Paula	CTBC Brothers	1.77
SO	José de Paula	CTBC Brothers	187
SV	Chen Yun-Wen	Uni-President Lions	32
Hld	Wu Chun-Wei	CTBC Brothers	27

== Taiwan Series ==
Because the first half and second-half championships were won by different teams, the 2021 Taiwan Series, a best of seven series, was played. The first-half champions, the CTBC Brothers, faced the second-half champions, the Uni-President Lions, with the first game scheduled on November 27 and the seventh game on December 5. Games after the first four will only be played if necessary. The Brothers, by having a better yearly record, earned home field advantage, hosting games 1, 2, 6, and 7 at their home field, Taichung Intercontinental Baseball Stadium. The Lions hosted games 3 at Chengcing Lake Baseball Stadium, 4 and 5 at their home field, Tainan Municipal Baseball Stadium. The series will be a rematch of the 2020 Taiwan Series which Lions won four games to three en route to their 10th Taiwan Series victory and first since 2013. This year, the Brothers swept the Lions in four games.

For the second time, CPBL sold presenting sponsorship to the series. Chunghwa Telecom, which is the largest telecommunications company in Taiwan will be presenting sponsor of the Taiwan Series. This series is officially known as the 2021 Taiwan Series Presented by Chunghwa Telecom.

=== Rules ===
All regular season rules apply with the following exceptions:

- Each team is allowed to register 28 players on its active roster.
- Games will be played until there is a winner, unlike other Asian leagues with a 12-inning limit.
- Two outfield umpires are added to the games.

=== Summary ===
CTBC won the series, 4–0.

Game	Date	Score	Location	Time	Attendance
1	November 27	Uni-President Lions – 0, **CTBC Brothers** – **2**	Taichung Intercontinental Baseball Stadium	2:43	20,000
2	November 28	Uni-President Lions – 3, **CTBC Brothers** – **8**	Taichung Intercontinental Baseball Stadium	3:29	18,888
3	November 30	**CTBC Brothers** – **7**, Uni-President Lions – 4	Chengcing Lake Baseball Stadium	3:47	10,280
4	December 1	**CTBC Brothers** – **5**, Uni-President Lions – 0	Tainan Municipal Baseball Stadium	3:13	10,000

=== Game summaries ===
==== Game 1 ====
November 27, 2021 5:05 pm (NST) at Taichung Intercontinental Baseball Stadium in Taichung, Taiwan
Team	1	2	3	4	5	6	7	8	9	R	H	E
Uni-President Lions	0	0	0	0	0	0	0	0	0	**0**	**6**	**0**
**CTBC Brothers**	0	0	0	0	0	0	2	0	X	**2**	**7**	**0**
Starting pitchers: Lions: Brock Dykxhoorn; Brothers: José de Paula; WP: José de Paula (1–0) LP: Brock Dykxhoorn (0–1) Sv: C. C. Lee (1); Home runs: Lions: None; Brothers: Tzu-Hsien Chan(1), Tung-Hua Yueh (1); Attendance: 20,000 (sold-out); Notes: MVP:José de Paula; Boxscore

==== Game 2 ====
November 28, 2021 5:05 pm (NST) at Taichung Intercontinental Baseball Stadium in Taichung, Taiwan
Team	1	2	3	4	5	6	7	8	9	R	H	E
Uni-President Lions	0	0	0	1	0	0	0	2	0	**3**	**11**	**2**
**CTBC Brothers**	3	3	0	0	0	0	1	1	X	**8**	**7**	**1**
Starting pitchers: Lions: Lisalverto Bonilla; Brothers: Lu Yen-Ching; WP: Lu Yen-Ching (1–0) LP: Lisalverto Bonilla (0–1); Home runs: Lions: None; Brothers: Chou Ssu-chi (1), Chi-Hung Hsu (1), Chi-Hung Hsu (2), Tzu-Hsien Chan(2), Attendance: 18,888; Notes: MVP:Chi-Hung Hsu; Boxscore

==== Game 3 ====
November 30, 2021 6:35 pm (NST) at Chengcing Lake Baseball Stadium in Kaohsiung, Taiwan
Team	1	2	3	4	5	6	7	8	9	R	H	E
**CTBC Brothers**	0	2	0	0	0	0	3	2	0	**7**	**7**	**1**
Uni-President Lions	0	1	0	1	0	0	0	2	0	**4**	**8**	**1**
Starting pitchers: Brothers: Cheng Kai-wen; Lions: Tim Melville; WP: Cheng Kai-wen (1–0) LP: Chen-Yen Chiang (0–1) Sv: C. C. Lee (2); Home runs: Brothers: Chen Tzu-Hao(1); Lions: None; Attendance: 10,280; Notes: MVP:Chen Tzu-Hao; Boxscore

==== Game 4 ====
December 1, 2021 6:35 pm (NST) at Tainan Municipal Baseball Stadium in Tainan, Taiwan
Team	1	2	3	4	5	6	7	8	9	R	H	E
**CTBC Brothers**	1	0	0	2	0	0	2	0	0	**5**	**11**	**0**
Uni-President Lions	0	0	0	0	0	0	0	0	0	**0**	**4**	**1**
Starting pitchers: Brothers: José Valdez; Lions: Chih-Wei Hu; WP: José Valdez (1–0) LP: Chih-Wei Hu (0–1); Attendance: 10,000; Notes: MVP:José Valdez; Boxscore
