= Oh Sun-jin =

South Korean baseball player (born 1989)

Kiwoom Heroes – No. 60
- Infielder
- Born: July 7, 1989 (age 37); Seoul, South Korea
- Bats: Right Throws: Right

KBO debut
- March 29, 2008, for the Hanwha Eagles

KBO statistics (through May 12, 2024)
- Batting average: .240
- Home runs: 18
- Runs batted in: 229
- Stats at Baseball Reference

Teams
- Hanwha Eagles (2008–2020); Samsung Lions (2021–2022); Hanwha Eagles (2023); Lotte Giants (2024); Kiwoom Heroes (2025-)

Oh Sun-jin (Korean: 오선진; born July 7, 1989, in Seoul) is a South Korean infielder for the Kiwoom Heroes in the Korea Baseball Organization (KBO).
