= Lee Hae-chang =

South Korean baseball player (born 1987)

Kia Tigers – No. 87
- Catcher
- Born: May 11, 1987 (age 39); South Korea
- Bats: Right Throws: Right

KBO debut
- April 2, 2011, for the Nexen Heroes

KBO statistics (through June 12, 2019)
- Batting average: .224
- Home runs: 25
- Runs batted in: 91
- Stats at Baseball Reference

Teams
- Nexen Heroes (2010-2014); KT Wiz (2015-2019); Hanwha Eagles (2020–2022)

- Korean name
- Hangul: 이해창
- Hanja: 李海昌
- RR: I Haechang
- MR: I Haech'ang

Lee Hae-chang (Korean: 이해창; born May 11, 1987) is the catcher of Hanwha Eagles of the KBO League. He joined Nexen Heroes in 2010. Then he moved to KT Wiz in 2015. He graduated Hanyang University.

He moved through the second draft of the KBO League in 2020.
