= Kang Jin-sung =

Korean baseball player

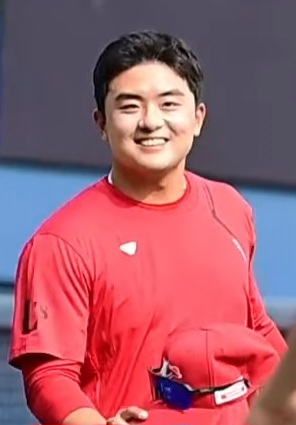
- Kang Jin-sung

SSG Landers – No. 49
- First baseman
- Born: October 19, 1993 (age 32); Seoul, South Korea
- Bats: Right Throws: Right

KBO debut
- September 5, 2013, for the NC Dinos

KBO statistics (through 2025)
- Batting average: .262
- Home runs: 26
- Runs batted in: 156
- Stats at Baseball Reference

Teams
- NC Dinos (2013, 2017–2021); Doosan Bears (2022–2023); SSG Landers (2023–present)

Kang Jin-sung (Korean: 강진성; born October 19, 1993, in Seoul) is a South Korean infielder for the Doosan Bears of the KBO League.
