= Teddy Stankiewicz =

American baseball player (born 1993)

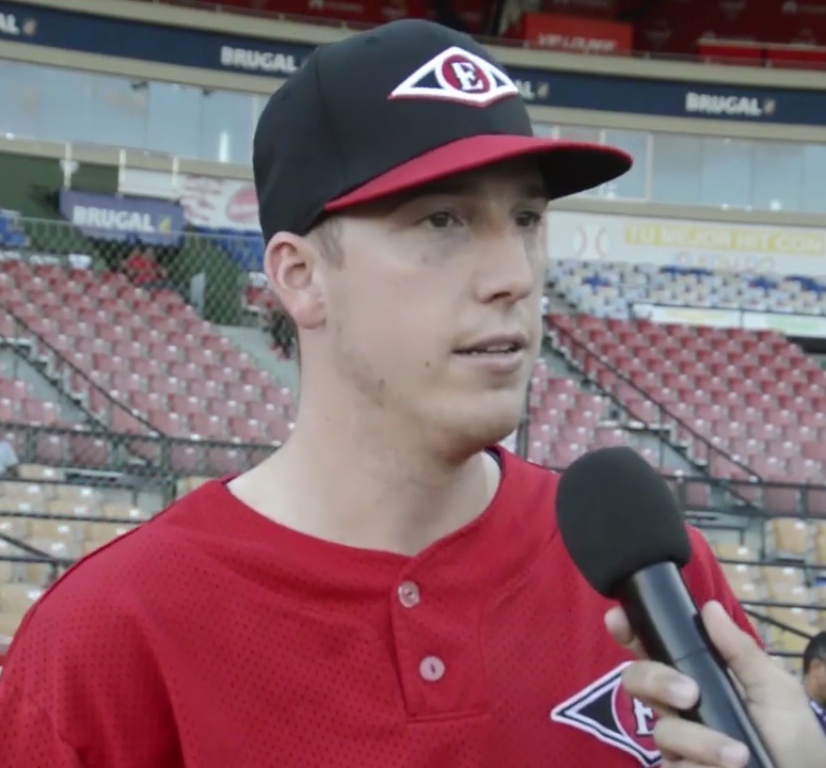
- Stankiewicz with the Leones del Escogido in 2019

Toros de Tijuana – No. 22
- Pitcher
- Born: November 25, 1993 (age 32); Keller, Texas, U.S.
- Bats: Right Throws: Right

CPBL debut
- August 28, 2020, for the Uni-President Lions

CPBL statistics (through 2022 season)
- Win–loss record: 17–8
- Earned run average: 3.22
- Strikeouts: 174
- Stats at Baseball Reference

Teams
- Uni-President Lions (2020–2021); CTBC Brothers (2022)

Career highlights and awards
- Taiwan Series champion (2020)

Theodore J. Stankiewicz (born November 25, 1993) is a Mexican-American professional baseball pitcher for the Toros de Tijuana of the Mexican League. He was drafted by the Boston Red Sox in the 2nd round of the 2013 MLB draft and played in the 2020 Summer Olympics for the Mexico national baseball team. He has also played in the Chinese Professional Baseball League (CPBL) for the Uni-President Lions and CTBC Brothers.

== Career ==
Stankiewicz was drafted by the New York Mets out of Fort Worth Christian School in the 2nd round, 75th overall, of the 2012 Major League Baseball draft, but did not sign.

=== Boston Red Sox ===
Stankiewicz was drafted by the Boston Red Sox out of Seminole State College in the second round, 45th overall, of the 2013 Major League Baseball draft. He made his professional debut with the Low-A Lowell Spinners.

In 2014, Stankiewicz played for the Single-A Greenville Drive, posting an 11–8 record and 3.72 ERA in 25 games. The following year, he played for the High-A Salem Red Sox, logging a 5–11 record and 4.01 ERA in 25 appearances. In 2016, Stankiewicz played for the Double-A Portland Sea Dogs, where he pitched to a 5–9 record and 4.71 ERA with 97 strikeouts in 135 2/3 innings pitched. He returned to Portland the following season, where he recorded a 5–6 record and 5.03 ERA in 25 appearances.

Stankiewicz split the 2018 season between Portland and the Triple-A Pawtucket Red Sox, accumulating an 8–14 record and 4.97 ERA with 115 strikeouts in 150 1/3 innings pitched. He returned to Pawtucket in 2019, where he pitched to a 6–7 record and 3.85 ERA in 24 appearances. On November 4, 2019, Stankiewicz elected free agency.

=== Uni-President Lions ===
On February 8, 2020, Stankiewicz signed with the Toros de Tijuana of the Mexican League. However, he did not play in a game with the team after the Mexican League season was cancelled because of the COVID-19 pandemic.

On July 30, 2020, Stankiewicz signed with the Uni-President Lions of the Chinese Professional Baseball League (CPBL). On August 28, Stankiewicz made his CPBL debut against the Rakuten Monkeys. In 10 games, 8 starts, in 2020 with the Lions, Stankiewicz logged a 6–0 record and 3.81 ERA with 47 strikeouts in 54 1/3 innings pitched. In addition, Stankiewicz won the 2020 Taiwan Series with the Lions.

Stankiewicz re-signed with the team for the 2021 season. On July 1, 2021, Stankiewicz parted ways with the Lions so he could represent Mexico in the Olympics and seek opportunities elsewhere. In 50 1/3 innings of work in 2021, Stankiewicz pitched to a 1.07 ERA and 0.64 WHIP.

=== Toros de Tijuana ===
On July 2, 2021, Stankiewicz signed with the Toros de Tijuana of the Mexican League. He made 1 appearance for the team, taking the loss after allowing 4 runs with 4 strikeouts across 2 1/3 innings pitched.

=== CTBC Brothers ===
On December 3, 2021, Stankiewicz signed with the CTBC Brothers of the CPBL for the 2022 season. On July 16, 2022, Stankiewicz requested and was granted his release due to family reasons. He finished the season with a 4.09 ERA and 1.38 WHIP over 88 innings.

=== Toros de Tijuana (second stint) ===
On November 3, 2022, Stankiewicz signed with the Toros de Tijuana of the Mexican League. Stankiewicz was named Tijuana's Opening Day starting pitcher in 2023. In 5 starts for the Toros, he registered a 3-1 record and 3.21 ERA with 33 strikeouts in 28.0 innings pitched.

=== Cincinnati Reds ===
On May 20, 2023, Stankiewicz signed a minor league contract with the Cincinnati Reds organization. In 18 appearances (14 starts) split between the Double–A Chattanooga Lookouts and Triple–A Louisville Bats, he struggled to a cumulative 7.59 ERA with 49 strikeouts across 70.0 innings pitched. Stankiewicz elected free agency following the season on November 6.

=== Toros de Tijuana (third stint) ===
On December 20, 2023, Stankiewicz signed with the Toros de Tijuana of the Mexican League. Stankiewicz made 11 appearances (10 starts) for Tijuana in 2024, registering a 4–2 record and 3.53 ERA with 29 strikeouts over 51 innings pitched.

=== Wei Chuan Dragons ===
On August 30, 2024, Stankiewicz signed with the Wei Chuan Dragons of the Chinese Professional Baseball League. He did not appear for the main club, only playing for the club's farm team, and became a free agent following the season.

=== Toros de Tijuana (fourth stint) ===
On March 15, 2025, Stankiewicz signed with the Toros de Tijuana of the Mexican League.

== International career ==
Stankiewicz was selected to the Mexico national baseball team at the 2020 Summer Olympics (contested in 2021).

== Personal life ==
Stankiewicz is not related to former Major League Baseball player Andy Stankiewicz, who played 7 seasons in MLB.

Stankiewicz was born without a right pectoral muscle, a condition he was unaware of until he underwent his post-draft Red Sox physical.

In 2014, while driving a pickup on US 377, Stankiewicz drove left of center, entered a broadslide, and slammed into an oncoming vehicle. The other driver was pronounced dead at the scene.
