= 2022 CPBL season =

33rd CPBL season
- League: Chinese Professional Baseball League
- Sport: Baseball
- Duration: 2 April – 26 October
- Games: 120
- Teams: 5

First half-season
- Season champions: Rakuten Monkeys

Second half-season
- Season champions: CTBC Brothers

Taiwan Series
- Champions: CTBC Brothers

CPBL seasons
- ← 2021 2023 →

The 2022 Chinese Professional Baseball League season was the 33rd season of the Chinese Professional Baseball League (CPBL), based in Taiwan.

== Season schedule ==
The regular season began on 2 April 2022 at the Taichung Intercontinental Baseball Stadium. Teams are playing a split-season, while second-half games started on 22 July at the newly renovated Hsinchu Municipal Baseball Stadium. The CPBL All-Star Game is being played the weekend of 30–31 July.

The postseason started on 29 October, followed by the first game of the Taiwan Series on 5 November. Postseason uses an apertura and clausura format. The first round, the Playoff Series, features the half-season champion with the lower winning percentage overall against the team with the overall highest winning percentage of all teams that did not win either half. The winner of the Playoff Series faced the half-season champion with the overall higher winning percentage of the two "seasons" in the Taiwan Series.

== Draft ==
From 2022, foreign-born players can be considered domestic draft picks if: they have attended a Taiwanese high school for three years, a Taiwanese university for four years, or have lived in Taiwan for five years, while playing for a Taiwanese semi-professional league for three years.

== Milestones ==
On Opening Day, Lin Chih-sheng, who was released by the CTBC Brothers at the end of last season, hit the 290th home run of his career, breaking the league record held by Chang Tai-shan, who is a coach for his newly adopted team, the Wei Chuan Dragons.

== Controversies ==
On the opening weekend of the second half of the season, the high expectations for the re-opening of the Hsinchu Municipal Baseball Stadium were dashed when the league announced that the stadium was to be closed temporarily due to player safety issues. Injuries to players in both games played showed inadequacies in the stadium, including the nature of the dirt in the infield. The stadium was to have been a second home to the Wei Chuan Dragons for the second half of the season, but as of this time it is unclear when games will be played in the stadium again.

== Standings ==
=== First half standings ===
Team	G	W	T	L	Pct.	GB
Rakuten Monkeys	60	37	1	22	.627	—
CTBC Brothers	60	32	2	26	.552	4½
Uni-President Lions	60	31	2	27	.534	5½
Wei Chuan Dragons	60	31	0	29	.517	6½
Fubon Guardians	60	16	1	43	.271	21

=== Second half standings ===
Team	G	W	T	L	Pct.	GB
CTBC Brothers	60	37	2	21	.638	—
Rakuten Monkeys	60	33	3	24	.579	3½
Fubon Guardians	60	30	3	26	.536	6½
Wei Chuan Dragons	60	26	5	29	.473	9½
Uni-President Lions	60	17	1	42	.288	20½

=== Full season standings ===
Team	G	W	T	L	Pct.	GB
Rakuten Monkeys	120	70	4	46	.603	—
CTBC Brothers	120	69	4	47	.595	1
Wei Chuan Dragons	120	57	5	58	.496	12½
Uni-President Lions	120	48	3	69	.410	22½
Fubon Guardians	120	46	4	70	.397	24

- Green denotes first-half or second-half champion.
- Yellow denotes clinching playoff qualification as the wild card.

== Playoffs ==
2022 CPBL playoff series			2022 Taiwan Series
			1	Rakuten Monkeys	0
2	CTBC Brothers	3	2	CTBC Brothers	4
3	Wei Chuan Dragons	1

=== CPBL Playoff Series ===
The series started with a 1–0 advantage for the second-placed team.

CTBC Brothers won the series, 3−1.

Game	Date	Score	Location	Time	Attendance
1	October 29	Wei Chuan Dragons – 2, CTBC Brothers – 6	Taichung Intercontinental Baseball Stadium	2:45	17,216
2	October 30	CTBC Brothers – 2, Wei Chuan Dragons – 4	Tianmu Baseball Stadium	3:02	9,885
3	October 31	Wei Chuan Dragons– 2, CTBC Brothers – 3	Taichung Intercontinental Baseball Stadium	3:44	7,925

=== Taiwan Series ===
CTBC Brothers won the series, 4−0.

Game	Date	Score	Location	Time	Attendance
1	November 5	CTBC Brothers – 5, Rakuten Monkeys – 3	Rakuten Taoyuan Baseball Stadium	3:18	14,132
2	November 6	CTBC Brothers – 4, Rakuten Monkeys – 1	Rakuten Taoyuan Baseball Stadium	3:28	11,392
3	November 8	Rakuten Monkeys– 2, CTBC Brothers – 7	Taichung Intercontinental Baseball Stadium	3:18	17,112
4	November 9	Rakuten Monkeys– 2, CTBC Brothers – 3	Taichung Intercontinental Baseball Stadium	3:19	20,000

== Statistical leaders ==
=== Hitting ===
Stat	Player	Team	Total
HR	Giljegiljaw Kungkuan; Lin Li	Wei Chuan Dragons; Rakuten Monkeys	14
AVG	Lin Li	Rakuten Monkeys	0.335
H	Lin Li	Rakuten Monkeys	140
RBIs	Lin Li	Rakuten Monkeys	83
SB	Chen Chen-Wei	Rakuten Monkeys	38

=== Pitching ===
Stat	Player	Team	Total
W	José de Paula	CTBC Brothers	14
ERA	Huang Tzu-Peng	Rakuten Monkeys	2.33
SO	José de Paula	CTBC Brothers	158
SV	Bradin Hagens	Rakuten Monkeys	36
Hld	Chen Yu-Hsun	Rakuten Monkeys	26

== See also ==
- 2022 in baseball
- 2022 Major League Baseball season
- 2022 KBO League season
- 2022 Nippon Professional Baseball season
