= Carter Loewen =

Canadian baseball player (born 1998)

- Pitcher
- Born: September 28, 1998 (age 27); Abbotsford, British Columbia, Canada
- Batted: Right Threw: Right

MiLB debut
- May 5, 2021, for the Fort Wayne Tincaps

Last MiLB appearance
- June 11, 2025, for the El Paso Chihuahuas

MiLB statistics
- Win–loss record: 9-5
- Earned run average: 3.70
- Strikeouts: 180

Carter Loewen (born September 28, 1998) is a Canadian former professional baseball pitcher.

== Career ==
Loewen attended Yale Secondary School in Abbotsford, British Columbia. Loewen was drafted in the 40th round of the 2016 MLB draft by the Toronto Blue Jays but decided instead to play college baseball at the University of Hawaii.

Loewen signed as an undrafted free agent with the San Diego Padres on June 15, 2020. He did not play in a game in 2020 due to the cancellation of the minor league season because of the COVID-19 pandemic. Loewen underwent Tommy John surgery in July 2021, which resulted in him missing most of the 2022 season. Loewen made two appearances for the Triple-A El Paso Chihuahuas in 2025.

Loewen was named to the Canada national baseball team for the 2026 World Baseball Classic but did not pitch because he was unable to obtain insurance. He retired suddenly on March 16, 2026, and was replaced on the roster by Brock Dykxhoorn.
