= Hsu Chi-hung =

Taiwanese baseball player (born 1992)

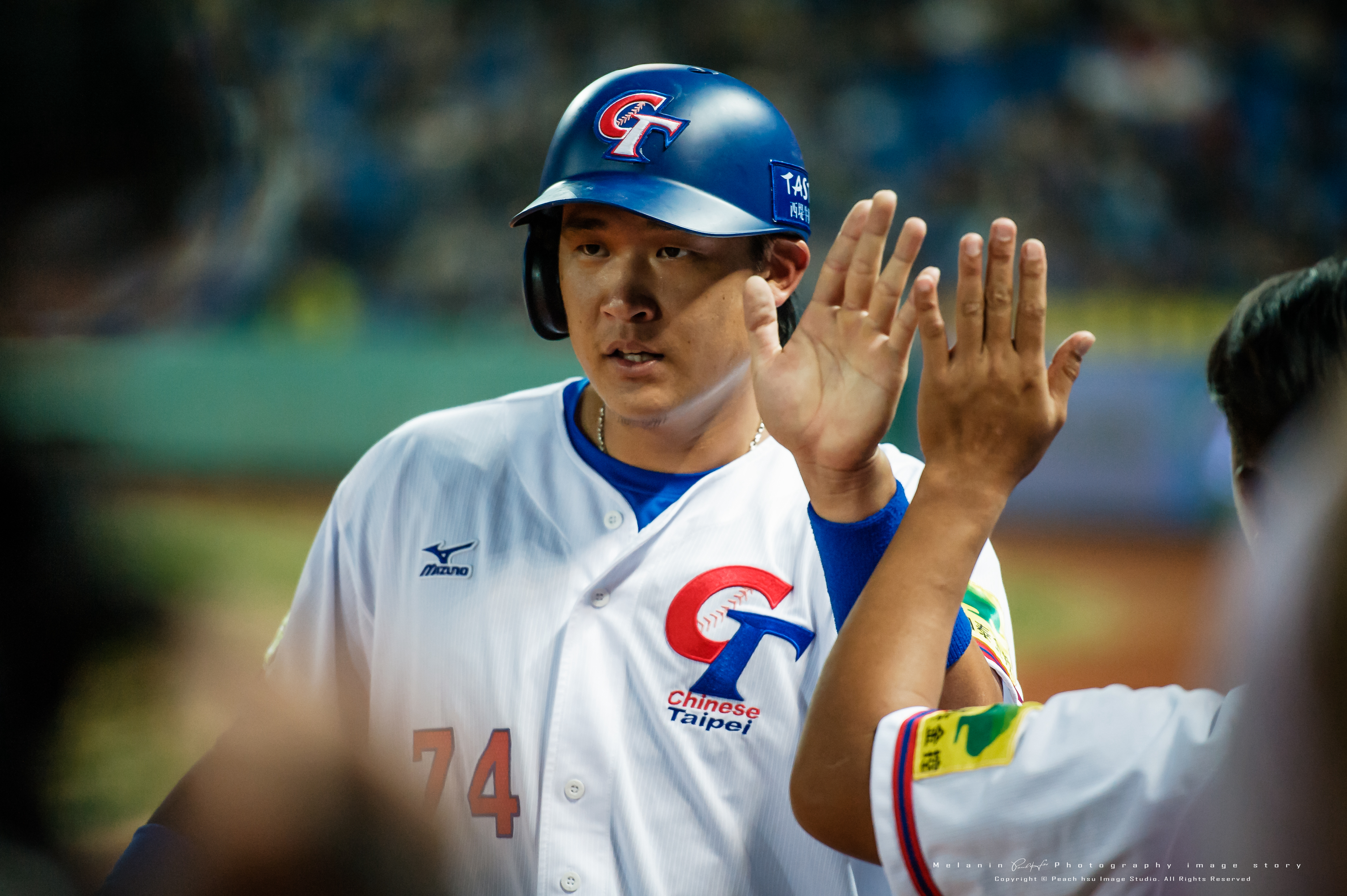
- Hsu in 2017

CTBC Brothers – No. 74
- Infielder
- Born: July 22, 1992 (age 34); Kaohsiung County, Taiwan
- Bats: Left Throws: Right

CPBL debut
- September 3, 2014, for the Chinatrust Brothers

CPBL statistics (through 2025)
- Batting average: .294
- Home runs: 116
- Runs batted in: 508
- Stats at Baseball Reference

Teams
- Chinatrust Brothers / CTBC Brothers (2014–present)

Career highlights and awards
- 3x Taiwan Series champion (2021, 2022, 2024)

Hsu Chi-hung (Chinese: 許基宏; born July 22, 1992) is a Taiwanese professional baseball infielder for the CTBC Brothers of the Chinese Professional Baseball League (CPBL). He was drafted by the Brothers in 2014 and won Rookie of the Year honors in 2015.

Hsu represented Taiwan at the 2004 Little League World Series, 2013 World Port Tournament, 2013 World Baseball Challenge, 2013 East Asian Games and 2017 World Baseball Classic.

Hsu signed with the Brisbane Bandits of the Australian Baseball League for the 2018/19 season.
