= José de Paula =

Dominican baseball player (born 1988)

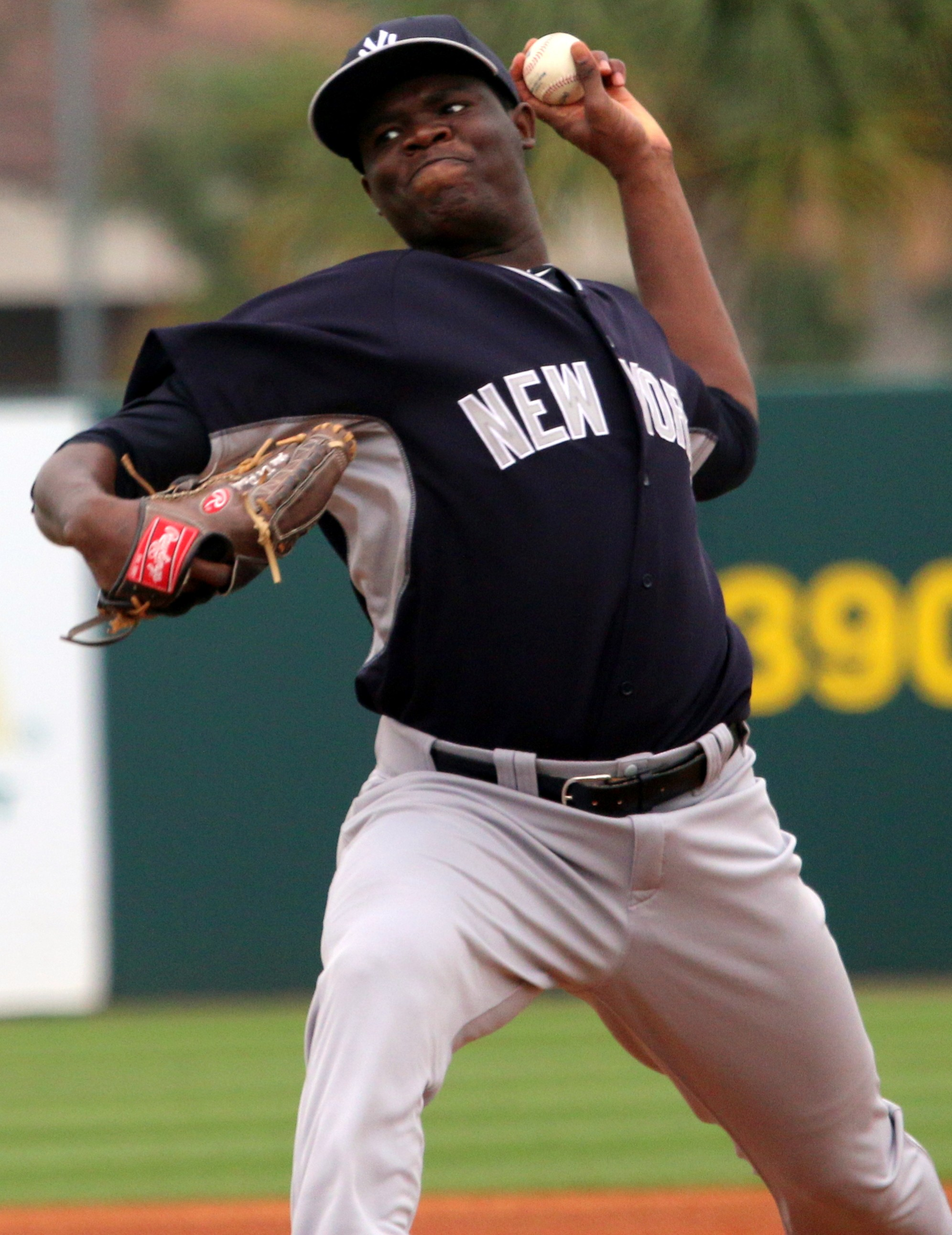
- José de Paula delivers a pitch

CTBC Brothers – No. 46
- Pitcher
- Born: March 4, 1988 (age 38); Villa Mella, Santo Domingo, Dominican Republic
- Bats: Right Throws: Left

Professional debut
- MLB: June 21, 2015, for the New York Yankees
- CPBL: April 14, 2020, for the CTBC Brothers

MLB statistics (through 2015 season)
- Win–loss record: 0–0
- Earned run average: 2.70
- Strikeouts: 2

CPBL statistics (through 2025 season)
- Win–loss record: 71–34
- Earned run average: 2.78
- Strikeouts: 800
- Stats at Baseball Reference

Teams
- New York Yankees (2015); CTBC Brothers (2020–present)

Career highlights and awards
- CPBL: 2x CPBL MVP (2020–2021); 3x Taiwan Series champion (2021, 2022, 2024)

José Alberto de Paula Carmona (born March 4, 1988) is a Dominican professional baseball pitcher for the CTBC Brothers of the Chinese Professional Baseball League (CPBL). He has previously played in Major League Baseball (MLB) for the New York Yankees.

== Career ==
=== San Diego Padres ===
On November 1, 2006, de Paula signed with the San Diego Padres organization as an international free agent. He made his professional debut in 2007 with the Dominican Summer League Padres, recording a 2.44 ERA in 14 games (13 starts). De Paula spent the 2008 season with the rookie-level Arizona League Padres, pitching to a 3.57 ERA across 13 starts. The following season, he appeared in only two games for the Low-A Eugene Emeralds.

De Paula spent the 2010 season with the Single-A Fort Wayne TinCaps, appearing in 20 games (14 starts) and posting an 8–5 record and 3.27 ERA with 69 strikeouts across 85 1/3 innings pitched. The following season, he progressed to the High-A Lake Elsinore Storm, where he made 26 appearances (23 starts) and logged a 10–5 record and 5.22 ERA with 87 strikeouts in 112 innings of work. On November 18, 2011, the Padres added de Paula to their 40-man roster to protect him from the Rule 5 draft.

De Paula spent the entire 2012 season on the restricted list after it was revealed that he was one year older than the Padres originally believed. In 2013, de Paula made 14 starts for the Double-A San Antonio Missions, registering a 4–6 record and 3.86 ERA with 57 strikeouts across 74 2/3 innings of work. On November 20, 2013, de Paula was designated for assignment after multiple prospects were added to the roster.

=== San Francisco Giants ===
On November 27, 2013, de Paula was claimed off waivers by the San Francisco Giants. In 16 games (10 starts) for the Triple-A Fresno Grizzlies, he posted a 4.21 ERA with 41 strikeouts across 51 1/3 innings pitched. De Paula later suffered an oblique injury, and did not pitch after July 23. The Giants designated de Paula for assignment on July 25, 2014. He was released on August 2. However, two days later, de Paula re-signed with the Giants organization on a minor league contract.

=== New York Yankees ===
On November 12, 2014, de Paula signed a one-year, split major league contract that would pay him $510,000 in the majors. He suffered a shoulder injury during spring training, and began the year on the disabled list. When he returned, de Paula pitched to a 1.53 earned run average in three games started for the Scranton/Wilkes-Barre RailRiders of the Triple-A International League before the Yankees promoted him to the major leagues for the first time on June 17, 2015.

He made his major league debut on June 21, 2015, against the Detroit Tigers. The first pitch he threw in his debut resulted in allowing a home run by Andrew Romine. It would be the only run he allowed in 3 1/3 innings pitched. A few hours after the game, he was optioned back down to Triple-A. He was designated for assignment on June 24, to create room on the 40-man roster for Iván Nova, who was activated from the disabled list. He cleared waivers and returned to Scranton on June 26. He elected free agency following the season on November 6.

=== Ishikawa Million Stars ===
On March 13, 2017, he signed with the Ishikawa Million Stars of the Baseball Challenge League. He elected free agency on June 13.

=== Sultanes de Monterrey ===
On May 4, 2018, de Paula signed with the Sultanes de Monterrey of the Mexican League. He made 13 starts for Monterrey during the season, logging a 4–5 record and 3.60 ERA with 73 strikeouts across 75 1/3 innings pitched.

In 2019, de Paula made 13 starts for Monterrey, compiling a 3–1 record and 4.74 ERA with 67 strikeouts across 62 2/3 innings of work.

=== Bravos de León ===
On July 29, 2019, de Paula was traded to the Bravos de León of the Mexican League. In five starts for León, de Paula posted a 3–0 record and 4.55 ERA with 20 strikeouts across 27 2/3 innings pitched.

=== CTBC Brothers ===
On January 6, 2020, de Paula signed with the CTBC Brothers of the Chinese Professional Baseball League. He led the CPBL in wins (16), ERA (3.20), and strikeouts (192). De Paula also posted a 1.16 WHIP and accumulated a 4.21 WAR over 174 1/3 innings pitched. He was voted the league MVP for the 2020 season.

De Paula was the Opening Day starting pitcher for the Brothers in 2021. He was once again stellar in his second season, posting a 16–4 record with a league-leading 1.77 ERA and 0.99 WHIP over 178 innings, and de Paula earned his second consecutive MVP award following the season. The CTBC Brothers won the 2021 CPBL championship after a 10-year drought, while de Paula was named the outstanding player of the winning team in the Taiwan Series.

On October 8, 2021, de Paula signed a one-year contract extension with the team. he made 24 starts for the Brothers in 2022, registering a 14–4 record and 2.44 ERA with 158 strikeouts in 162.0 innings of work. Following the season, he was named a CPBL Best Ten award winner.

On May 20, 2023, de Paula became the fastest player in CPBL history to reach 50 wins. He achieved the feat in 85 game (84 starts), breaking the previous record of 91 games set by José Núñez. On June 25, 2023, de Paula became the fastest player in CPBL history to reach 600 strikeouts. He achieved the feat in 90 games, breaking the previous record of 108 games, which was set by Enrique Burgos in 1997. On the season, he started 27 games for the Brothers, going 10–9 with a 3.53 ERA and 139 strikeouts across 173 1/3 innings pitched.

De Paula re-signed with the Brothers for the 2024 season on January 17, 2024. In 20 starts for the team, he compiled a 10–5 record and 3.05 ERA with 91 strikeouts over 127 innings. With the Brothers, de Paula won the 2024 Taiwan Series, and was named the outstanding player of the winning team in the Taiwan Series for the second time after 2021. De Paula became the first CPBL pitcher to win the first game in three Taiwan Series, and he also claimed his record-tying 5th Taiwan Series victory in the last game of 2024.

On January 11, 2025, de Paula once more re-signed with the Brothers. In nine starts for the team, he logged a 5–3 record and 2.75 ERA with 33 strikeouts across 52 1/3 innings pitched; he did not pitch after June 4 due to an arm injury. On August 14, de Paula was released by the Brothers.

One January 22, 2026, de Paula renewed his contract with the Brothers.
