= National Pingtung Senior High School =

Senior high school in Pingtung City, Pingtung County, Taiwan

- 國立屏東高級中學

Location
- No.231 Zhongxiao Rd; Pingtung City; Taiwan
- Coordinates: 23°56′45.95″N 122°15′21.09″E

Information
- Type: Public school
- Established: 1938
- Principal: Chen Chang-Jui
- Staff: 171
- Grades: 10-12
- Gender: Male
- Enrollment: 2232
- Color: Purple
- Athletics: Basketball、Baseball
- Publication: 屏中青年、屏中報、屏中傳奇
- School tree: Albizia saman
- Website: www.pths.ptc.edu.tw

National Pingtung Senior High School (Chinese: 國立屏東高中; 屏東高中; 屏中) is a senior high school in Pingtung City, Pingtung County, Taiwan.

== Notable alumni ==
- Steve Chang, Co-founder and former CEO of Trend Micro
- CC Lee, Cleveland Indians pitcher
- Chen Yun-wen, baseball player

== See also ==
- Education in Taiwan
