= Brock Dykxhoorn =

Canadian baseball player (born 1994)

Uni-President Lions – No. 50
- Pitcher
- Born: July 2, 1994 (age 32); Goderich, Ontario, Canada
- Bats: Right Throws: Right

Professional debut
- KBO: March 26, 2019, for the SK Wyverns
- CPBL: August 1, 2020, for the Uni-President Lions

KBO statistics (through 2019 season)
- Win–loss record: 6–10
- Earned run average: 4.34
- Strikeouts: 117

CPBL statistics (through July 6, 2026)
- Win–loss record: 52-35
- Earned run average: 2.95
- Strikeouts: 590
- Stats at Baseball Reference

Teams
- SK Wyverns (2019); Lotte Giants (2019); Uni-President Lions (2020–present)

Career highlights and awards
- Taiwan Series champion (2020); Taiwan Series MVP (2020)
Medals
Men's baseball
Representing Canada
18U Baseball World Championship
| Silver medal – second place | 2012 Seoul | Team |
Pan American Games
| Gold medal – first place | 2015 Toronto | Team |

Brock D. Dykxhoorn (born July 2, 1994) is a Canadian professional baseball pitcher for the Uni-President Lions of Taiwan's Chinese Professional Baseball League (CPBL). He has previously played in the KBO League for the SK Wyverns and Lotte Giants.

== Career ==
=== Amateur career ===
Dykxhoorn attended St. Anne's Catholic Secondary School in Clinton, Ontario, and Central Arizona College.

=== Houston Astros ===
The Houston Astros selected Dykxhoorn in the sixth round of the 2014 Major League Baseball draft, and signed him for a $250,000 signing bonus.

After signing, Dykxhoorn was assigned to the Greeneville Astros where he went 3–3 with a 4.31 ERA in 12 games. In 2015, he played for the Quad Cities River Bandits, posting an 8–5 record and 3.88 ERA. He was promoted to the Lancaster JetHawks for the 2016 season where he went 10–4 with a 5.02 ERA in a career high 123 2/3 innings pitched. He spent the 2017 season with the Corpus Christi Hooks, going 3–5 with a 4.62 ERA in 25 games pitched. He was released by the Astros organization on November 13, 2018.

=== SK Wyverns ===
On November 16, 2018, he signed with SK Wyverns of the KBO League. On March 26, 2019, Dykxhoorn made his KBO debut. He was waived on June 3.

=== Lotte Giants ===
On June 9, 2019, Dykxhoorn was claimed off waivers by the Lotte Giants of the KBO League. In 29 total games (28 starts) for the Giants, he posted a 6-10 record and 4.34 ERA with 117 strikeouts across 149 1/3 innings pitched. After the season, October 13, Dykxhoorn was selected for the Canadian national baseball team at the 2019 WBSC Premier12.

=== Uni-President Lions ===
On June 23, 2020, Dykxhoorn signed with the Uni-President Lions of the Chinese Professional Baseball League. Dykxhoorn won the 2020 Taiwan Series with the Lions and re-signed with the team for the 2021 season. In 27 games, he posted an impressive 1.83 ERA, 0.89 WHIP, and accumulated 4.56 WAR over 181 2/3 innings. On January 5, 2022, Dykxhoorn re-signed with the club. On August 8, it was announced that Dykxhoorn would undergo back surgery to repair a herniated disc and miss 3 months, and likely the remainder of the season. In 12 starts for the team, Dykxhoorn logged a 3-3 record and 2.96 ERA with 50 strikeouts in 73 innings pitched.

On December 17, 2022, Dykxhoorn re-signed with the Lions for the 2023 season. In 25 starts, he posted a 10-7 record and 2.83 ERA with 104 strikeouts over 149 2/3 innings of work. Dykxhoorn made 21 appearances (19 starts) for the Lions in 2024, compiling an 8-4 record and 2.58 ERA with 95 strikeouts across 122 innings pitched.

On January 10, 2025, Dykxhoorn re-signed with the Lions for his sixth season with the team. He was named the Lions' Opening Day starter to begin the regular season. In 21 starts for the Lions, Dykxhoorn compiled a 7-9 record and 4.13 ERA with 89 strikeouts over 122 innings of work. At the end of the 2026 regular season, Dykxhoorn was awarded a Gold Glove at pitcher.

== International career ==
Dykxhoorn was selected to play for Canada in the 2026 World Baseball Classic as a replacement for Carter Loewen, who was unable to participate because of insurance issues.
