= Chen Yun-wen =

Taiwanese baseball player (born 1995)

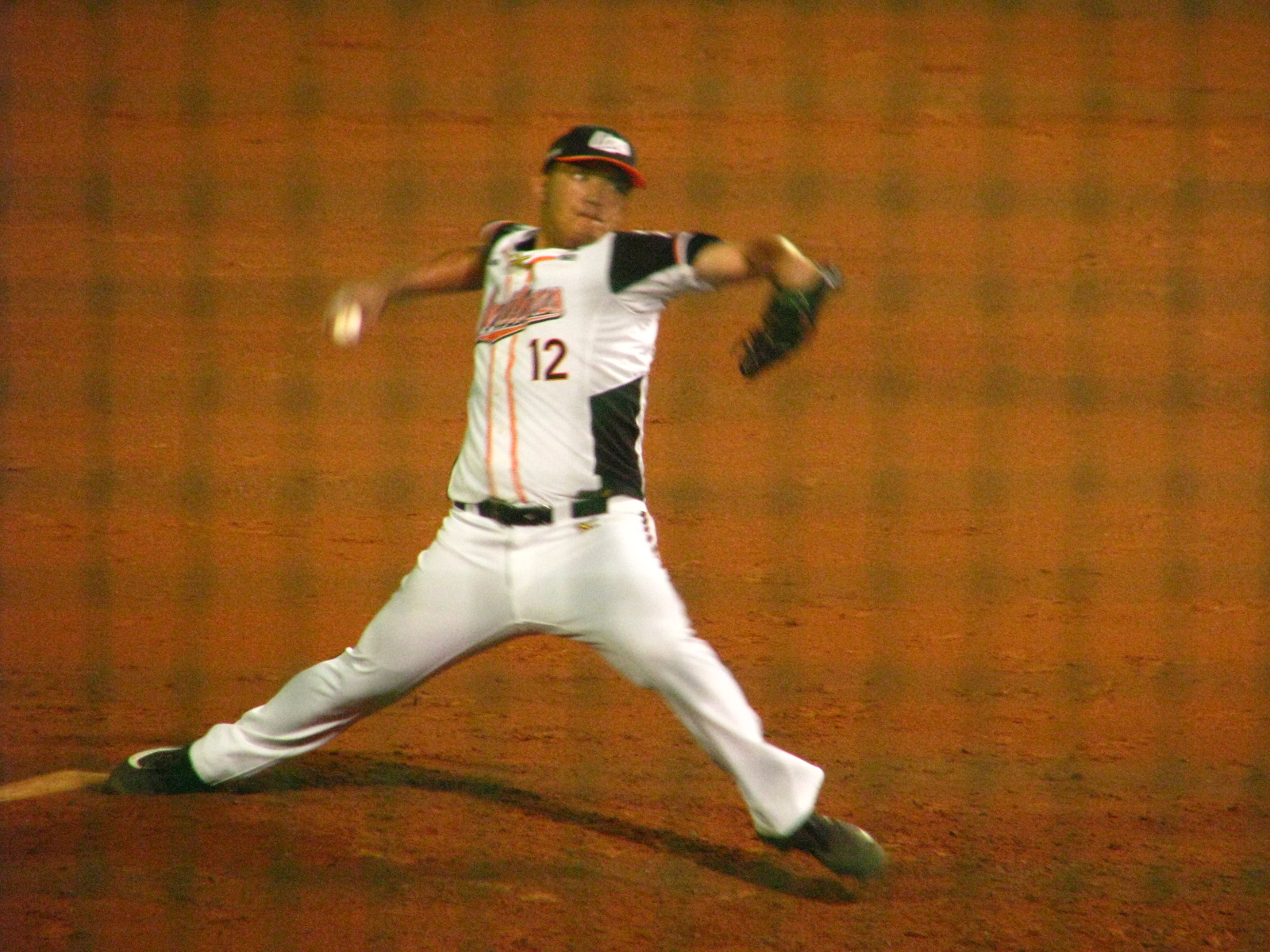

Uni-President Lions – No. 12
- Pitcher
- Born: November 28, 1995 (age 30); Pingtung County, Taiwan
- Bats: Right Throws: Right

CPBL debut
- September 12, 2015, for the Uni-President Lions

CPBL statistics (through 2025)
- Win–loss record: 31–28
- Earned run average: 3.45
- Strikeouts: 494
- Saves: 175
- Stats at Baseball Reference

Teams
- Uni-President Lions (2015–present)

Career highlights and awards
- Taiwan Series champion (2020)

Chen Yun-wen (Chinese: 陳韻文; born November 28, 1995) is a Taiwanese professional baseball pitcher for the Uni-President 7-Eleven Lions of the Chinese Professional Baseball League (CPBL).

== Career ==
=== Uni-President Lions ===
Chen attended Pingtung High School and was the second overall pick by the Uni-President Lions in the Chinese Professional Baseball League draft in 2014.

On April 5, 2023, Chen set the CPBL all-time record for saves after converting his 130th career save against the Wei Chuan Dragons, surpassing the previous record (129) held by Lin Yueh-ping. He accomplished the feat in front of the two former CPBL save leaders: Lin, who was serving as the manager of the Lions, and Mike Garcia, who was the Dragons’ pitching coach.

Chen made 39 appearances for the Lions in 2024, registering a 2–4 record and 4.59 ERA with 36 strikeouts and 10 saves across 33 1/3 innings pitched. Following the season on November 8, 2024, Chen elected for free agency.

On December 13, 2024, Chen re–signed with the Lions on a five–year, $1.5 million contract.

== International career ==
Tsai represented Taiwan at the 2013 18U Baseball World Cup and 2017 World Baseball Classic.
