= 2021 in baseball =

The following are the baseball events of the year 2021 throughout the world.

== International competition ==
=== National Team tournaments ===
- Americas Olympic Qualifying Event: United States
- Olympics Final Qualifying Tournament: Dominican Republic
- 2020 Summer Olympics: Japan
- European Baseball Championship: Netherlands
- U-23 Baseball World Cup: Venezuela

=== Club team tournaments ===
- 2021 Caribbean Series: Águilas Cibaeñas
- European Cup: Parma Baseball Club

== U.S.A. domestic leagues ==
- Major League Baseball

Wild Card Games (ALWC, NLWC)
4	Boston	1
5	NY Yankees	0
4	LA Dodgers	1
5	St. Louis	0

Division Series (ALDS, NLDS)
1	Tampa Bay	1
4	Boston	3
American League
2	Houston	3
3	Chicago White Sox	1
1	San Francisco	2
4	LA Dodgers	3
National League
2	Milwaukee	1
3	Atlanta	3

League Championship Series (ALCS, NLCS)
4	Boston	2
2	Houston	4
4	LA Dodgers	2
3	Atlanta	4

World Series
AL2	Houston	2
NL3	Atlanta	4

- Minor League Baseball
  - Triple-A East: Durham Bulls (Tampa Bay Rays)
  - Triple-A West: Tacoma Rainiers (Seattle Mariners)
  - Double-A Central: Northwest Arkansas Naturals (Kansas City Royals)
  - Double-A Northeast: Akron RubberDucks (Cleveland Indians)
  - Double-A South: Mississippi Braves (Atlanta Braves)
  - High-A Central: Quad Cities River Bandits (Kansas City Royals)
  - High-A East: Bowling Green Hot Rods (Tampa Bay Rays)
  - High-A West: Eugene Emeralds (San Francisco Giants)
  - Low-A East: Charleston RiverDogs (Tampa Bay Rays)
  - Low-A Southeast: Bradenton Marauders (Pittsburgh Pirates)
  - Low-A West: San Jose Giants (San Francisco Giants)
  - Arizona Complex League: No Champion Declared
  - Dominican Summer League: No Champion Declared
  - Florida Complex League: No Champion Declared
- Fall league
  - Arizona Fall League: Mesa Solar Sox
- MLB partner leagues
  - American Association of Professional Baseball: Kansas City Monarchs
  - Atlantic League of Professional Baseball: Lexington Legends
  - Frontier League: Schaumburg Boomers
  - Pioneer League: Missoula PaddleHeads
- Independent leagues
  - Empire Professional Baseball League: Saranac Lake Surge
  - Pecos League: Tucson Saguaros
  - United Shore Professional Baseball League: Utica Unicorns
- College Baseball
  - 2021 College World Series: Mississippi State
  - NCAA Division II: Wingate University
  - NCAA Division III: Salisbury University
  - NAIA: Georgia Gwinnett College
  - Junior College World Series:
    - Division I: McLennan Community College
    - Division II: Louisiana State University at Eunice
    - Division III: Tyler Junior College
- Collegiate Summer Baseball Leagues
  - Appalachian League: Greeneville Flyboys
  - Cape Cod League: Brewster Whitecaps
  - MLB Draft League: Trenton Thunder
  - New England Collegiate Baseball League: Danbury Westerners
- 2021 Little League World Series: Taylor North Little League (Taylor, Michigan)

== Other domestic leagues ==
=== Summer leagues ===
- Chinese Professional Baseball League—Taiwan Series: CTBC Brothers
- Dutch League: L&D Amsterdam
- Finnish League: Tampere Tigers
- French League: Rouen Baseball 76
- German League: Heidenheim Heideköpfe
- Irish League: Mariners Baseball
- Italian League: T & A San Marino
- KBO League—Korean Series: KT Wiz
- Mexican League: Toros de Tijuana
- Nippon Professional Baseball—Japan Series: Tokyo Yakult Swallows
  - Central League: Tokyo Yakult Swallows
  - Pacific League: Orix Buffaloes
- Spanish League: Tenerife Marlins
- Swedish League: Leksand Lumberjacks

=== Winter leagues ===
- Australian Baseball League: Melbourne Aces
- Colombian League: Caimanes de Barranquilla
- Cuban National Series: Alazanes de Granma
- Dominican League: Águilas Cibaeñas
- Mexican Pacific League: Tomateros de Culiacán
- Nicaraguan League: Gigantes de Rivas
- Panamanian League: Cancelled
- Puerto Rican League: Criollos de Caguas
- Venezuelan League: Caribes de Anzoátegui

== Awards and honors ==
=== Major League Baseball ===
- Baseball Hall of Fame honors

== Events ==
=== January ===
- January 26: For the first time since 2013, the Baseball Writers' Association of America fails to select a player for induction into the Hall of Fame. Curt Schilling, Barry Bonds and Roger Clemens, all in their ninth year on the ballot, receive 71.1, 61.8 and 61.6 percent of the ballot respectively. Scott Rolen, in his fourth year on the ballot, is the only other player named on half of the ballots at 52.9%.

=== February ===
- February 12: Major League Baseball announced its new league structure for minor league play, a structure that excluded and effectively disbanded the historic leagues between class A and AAA.
- February 25: Spring Training Begins for all 30 teams including Pitchers and catchers

=== March ===
- March 17: St Patricks Day

=== April ===
- April 1: 2021 Major League Baseball season begins
- April 9:
  - After 52 seasons and 8,205 games, the San Diego Padres record their first no-hitter with Joe Musgrove performing the deed, blanking the Texas Rangers 3–0 at Globe Life Field. He throws 77 of 112 pitches for strikes and strikes out 10 batters; a fourth-inning hit by pitch to Joey Gallo is the only blemish in an otherwise perfect game. The Padres had been the last of the 30 Major League teams to record a no-hitter. Previously, they had had four no-hit bids broken up in the ninth, with Steve Arlin having come the closest, losing his bid on July 18, 1972 with two out and one strike to go.
  - Alessandro Ercolani signs an amateur free agent contract with the Pittsburgh Pirates, becoming the first player born in San Marino and the first player developed in San Marino to sign a professional baseball contract outside of the Italian Baseball League.
- April 14: At Guaranteed Rate Field, Carlos Rodón of the Chicago White Sox no-hits the Cleveland Indians 8–0, the 20th no-hitter in franchise history. After retiring the first 25 batters, he loses his bid for a perfect game on a hit by pitch to Roberto Pérez. Rodón, who strikes out seven and throws 75 of 114 pitches for strikes, then retires the next two batters. Rodón becomes the fourth pitcher to record a no-hitter after losing a perfect game bid in the ninth, joining Jack Kralick in 1962, Milt Pappas in 1972 and Max Scherzer in the first of his two 2015 no-hitters (the latter's bid was also broken up on a hit by pitch, with two out). The no-hitter also ties Eddie Cicotte's 104-year record for the earliest no-hitter calendar-wise by a White Sox pitcher.
- April 15: Jackie Robinson Day
- April 18: At Great American Ball Park, Shane Bieber of the Cleveland Indians becomes the first pitcher to strike out at least 10 batters in his first four starts of a season, dating back to when the mound was moved to its current distance in 1893. He records 13 strikeouts in eight innings in the Indians' 6–3 victory over the Cincinnati Reds. With 48 strikeouts in these four starts, Bieber also ties Nolan Ryan's 43-year record for most strikeouts in his first four starts of a season.
- April 23:
  - At Citi Field, Jacob deGrom of the New York Mets shuts out the Washington Nationals 6–0, striking out 15 batters along the way. With 50 strikeouts on season, he breaks the record of 48 for most by a pitcher in his first four starts of a season, Nolan Ryan having set the record in 1978 and Shane Bieber having tied it only five days earlier. deGrom also becomes the third pitcher, after Pedro Martínez in 1999 and Gerrit Cole in 2019, to strike out at least 14 batters in three consecutive starts.
  - At Dodger Stadium, Fernando Tatís Jr. hits two home runs off Clayton Kershaw, in the third and fifth innings, to help the San Diego Padres defeat the Los Angeles Dodgers 6–1. Tatís' performance comes 22 years to the day that his father, Fernando Sr., while playing for the St. Louis Cardinals, became the only player, to date, to hit two grand slams in the same inning of a Major League game, that feat also having occurred at Dodger Stadium. Like the son's first home run, the father's two had also come in the third inning; the Cardinals defeated the Dodgers 12–5.
- April 24: For the second consecutive game, Fernando Tatís Jr. records a two-home run game at Dodger Stadium, this time with both home runs coming off defending National League Cy Young Award winner Trevor Bauer in the San Diego Padres' 5–4 loss to the Los Angeles Dodgers. According to STATS, Tatís, having hit two home runs off three-time Cy Young winner Clayton Kershaw the day before, becomes the first player to hit multiple home runs against former Cy Young Award winners in consecutive games, as well as the first visiting player to record consecutive multi-home run games at Dodger Stadium since Barry Bonds in 2002.
- April 25: Madison Bumgarner of the Arizona Diamondbacks no-hits the Atlanta Braves 7–0 at Truist Park in the second game of a doubleheader. However, Bumgarner's feat is an unofficial no-hitter, as for the 2021 season, both games of a doubleheader last only seven innings.
- April 26: At Globe Life Field, Justin Upton and Albert Pujols hit back-to-back home runs, the 312th and 667th respectively of their careers, in the third inning of the Los Angeles Angels' 9–4 victory over the Texas Rangers. The 979 homers are the third-most combined between teammates hitting back-to-back homers in the same game. The top two marks are by New York Yankee teammates: 1,099 between Alex Rodriguez (694) and Carlos Beltrán (405) on June 3, 2016, and 1,005 between Babe Ruth (694) and Lou Gehrig (311) on May 28, 1934.
- April 30: Hall-of-Famer Roberto Alomar is fired by the Toronto Blue Jays and placed on Major League Baseball's ineligible list following an independent investigation into allegations of sexual misconduct from 2014. Alomar will remain enshrined in the Hall of Fame; however, the Blue Jays announce that they will sever all ties with him, removing his retired number 12 jersey from the Rogers Centre and his name from the stadium's "Level of Excellence", as well as taking down his Hall of Fame banner.

=== May ===
- May 4: Minor League season begins
- May 5: At T-Mobile Park, John Means of the Baltimore Orioles no-hits the Seattle Mariners 6–0. He strikes out 12 and faces the minimum 27 batters, Sam Haggerty's reaching base on a dropped third strike in the third inning being the only blemish in an otherwise perfect game; Haggerty is subsequently caught stealing. The no-hitter is the Orioles' first since Bob Milacki, Mike Flanagan, Mark Williamson and Gregg Olson combined for one on July 13, 1991, and their first solo no-hitter since Jim Palmer's on August 13, 1969.
- May 7: At Progressive Field, Wade Miley of the Cincinnati Reds no-hits the Cleveland Indians 3–0. He strikes out eight and throws 72 of 114 pitches for strikes. The only blemishes are in the sixth inning: a double error by Nick Senzel with Amed Rosario batting, first on a fielding error, then on a throwing error that advances Rosario to second base, then a walk to César Hernández. The no-hitter is the 17th in Reds history, the most recent having been Homer Bailey's second on July 2, 2013.
- May 13: In his Milwaukee Brewers' 2–0 loss to the St. Louis Cardinals at American Family Field, Corbin Burnes sets a Major League record for most strikeouts without a base on balls. Entering the game with 49 strikeouts, he strikes out nine before walking Tommy Edman in the fifth inning, the first walk Burnes issues this season. The 58 strikeouts without a walk is the most at any stretch of the season, Curt Schilling having set the old record of 56 in 2002 and Gerrit Cole having tied it one day earlier. Burnes also sets a record for strikeouts without a walk to begin a season, Kenley Jansen having set the old record of 51 in 2017
- May 18: At T-Mobile Park, Spencer Turnbull of the Detroit Tigers no-hits the Seattle Mariners 5–0. He strikes out nine batters and throws 77 of 117 pitches for strikes in throwing the eighth no-hitter in Tiger history, and the first since the second of Justin Verlander's three no-hitters on May 7, 2011. The no-hitter is the fifth in the Major Leagues this season, marking the first time since 1917 that five no-hitters had been pitched in one season as of May 18. With John Means of the Baltimore Orioles having no-hit the Mariners on May 5, the Mariners become the first team since the Los Angeles Dodgers in August 2015 to be no-hit twice in the same month.
- May 19: The sixth no-hitter on the season is pitched, with the New York Yankees' Corey Kluber performing the feat, a 2-0 gem against his former team, the Texas Rangers, at Globe Life Field. Kluber strikes out nine batters, throws 71 of 101 pitches for strikes and yields only one baserunner, a third-inning walk to Charlie Culberson, in throwing the 12th no-hitter in Yankee history and the first since David Cone's perfect game in 1999. With this no-hitter, this season sets a record for most no-hitters before the month of June; the no-hitter also places this season one short of the joint modern-day record of seven pitched in both 1990 and 1991.

=== June ===
- June 3: Durham Bulls pitcher Tyler Zombro is hit in the head by a 104-mile-per-hour (167 km/h) line drive, causing him to have a seizure on the pitcher's mound and fracturing his skull.
- June 15: MLB releases a memo relating to foreign substances on baseballs, announcing "a uniform standard for the consistent application of the rules, including regular checks of all pitchers regardless of whether an opposing club's manager makes a request." Included in MLB's announcement were mandatory checks of all pitchers by umpires, with any player found to have a foreign substance immediately ejected and suspended for 10 games.
- June 18–30: 2021 College World Series
- June 24: At Dodger Stadium, four Chicago Cubs pitcher combine to no-hit the Los Angeles Dodgers 4–0. Zach Davies pitches the first six innings, followed by Ryan Tepera, Andrew Chafin and Craig Kimbrel pitching one inning each. The no-hitter is the 17th in Cubs history, and their first-ever combined no-hitter. It is also the seventh no-hitter on the season, tying the modern-day record held jointly by the 1990, 1991 and 2012 seasons.
- June 25: In the first game of a doubleheader at Citi Field, Aaron Nola of the Philadelphia Phillies strikes out 10 consecutive batters in the Phillies' 2–1, 8-inning loss to the New York Mets. After hitting Jeff McNeil with a pitch and allowing a double to Francisco Lindor to begin the game, Nola strikes out the entire Mets lineup, including Michael Conforto twice. He leaves the game with 12 strikeouts in 5 1/3 innings. Nola ties Tom Seaver's 51-year record for most consecutive strikeouts in one game; Seaver, as a Met, had struck out the last 10 San Diego Padres he faced in an April 22, 1970 game at Citi Field's predecessor, Shea Stadium.

=== July ===
- July 11–13: 2021 Major League Baseball draft
- July 13: The American League defeated the National League 5–2 in the 91st MLB All-Star Game. Played at Coors Field in Denver, the game was supposed to be played at Truist Park in Cumberland, Georgia, but was moved to Denver in April. Los Angeles Angels pitcher Shohei Ohtani was the winner and was also the DH for the game. Vladimir Guerrero Jr of the Toronto Blue Jays won MVP Award honors. Former Indianapolis Colts and Denver Broncos Quarterback Peyton Manning threw out the first Ceremonial Pitch.
- July 31: Trading Deadline

=== August ===
- August 11: At Wrigley Field, Corbin Burnes of the Milwaukee Brewers strikes out 10 consecutive Chicago Cubs in a 10-0 Milwaukee victory. He begins the streak by striking out Frank Schwindel leading off the second inning; after he strikes out Schwindel a second time to begin the fifth, a single by Matt Duffy ends the streak. Burnes becomes the third pitcher to strike out 10 consecutive batters in a game, Tom Seaver having set the record on April 22, 1970 and Aaron Nola having tied it on June 25 of this season.
- August 14: At Chase Field, Tyler Gilbert of the Arizona Diamondbacks no-hits the San Diego Padres 7–0 in his first Major League start. Gilbert, who had made three scoreless appearances with Arizona earlier in the season, walks three and strikes out five in pitching the third no-hitter in Diamondbacks history, and the eighth on the season, tying a single-season record set in 1884, the first year overhand pitching was allowed. Gilbert becomes the first pitcher since Bobo Holloman in 1953, and one of four overall, to pitch a no-hitter in his first Major League start. Ted Breitenstein and Bumpus Jones were the other two, having done so in 1891 and 1892 respectively.
- August 22: Miguel Cabrera hit his 500th career home run, doing it against the Toronto Blue Jays at Rogers Centre. He became the 28th player to reach this mark.
- August 19–29: The 2021 Little League World Series in South Williamsport, Pennsylvania, is held with US-only teams due to the COVID-19 pandemic. The tournament is won by the Taylor North Little League from Taylor, Michigan.
- August 25: The Baltimore Orioles defeat the Los Angeles Angels by a score of 10–6, snapping a 19-game losing streak. It is their second streak of 10 or more losses of the season.
- August 27–29: Players Weekend
- August 30: Postseason-eligible trading deadline

=== September ===
- September 1: MLB active rosters expanded from 26 to 28 players
- September 8: Induction ceremonies are held at the National Baseball Hall of Fame and Museum in Cooperstown, New York. While no one was selected for induction to the Hall of Fame in 2021 balloting, inductees from 2020 balloting are honored (the planned 2020 ceremonies were canceled due to the COVID-19 pandemic). The three living inductees—Derek Jeter, Ted Simmons, and Larry Walker—are present, while Marvin Miller, who died in 2012, is represented by Donald Fehr.

=== October ===
- October 3: End of the Major League Baseball Regular season
- October 22: The Houston Astros clinch a trip to the 2021 World Series and defeat the Boston Red Sox 5–0 to win the 2021 American League Championship Series in six games to make it 3 World Series trips in 5 Years.
- October 23: The Atlanta Braves clinch a trip to the 2021 World Series and defeat and also dethrone the World Champion Los Angeles Dodgers 4–2 to win the 2021 National League Championship Series in six games and advance to their first world series in 22 years.

=== November ===
- November 2: The Atlanta Braves won the 2021 World Series with a 7–0 win over the Houston Astros to capture their first World Series championship since 1995. Jorge Soler was named MVP of the World Series.
- November 4: Buster Posey announces his retirement after 12 seasons with the San Francisco Giants and winning three World Series championships with the team in 2010, 2012 and 2014. He was also the 2020 comeback player of the year.
- November 7: The 2021 Golden Glove Awards were announced winners included Paul Goldschmidt who won his fourth gold glove with the St. Louis Cardinals and Yuli Gurriel from the Houston Astros who won his first career gold glove.
- November 11: The 2021 Sliver Slugger Awards were announced winners included Bryce Harper from the Philadelphia Phillies who won his second sliver slugger award and Shohei Ohtani from the LA Angels wins his first career sliver slugger award.
- November 16: Kevin Cash of the Tampa Bay Rays was named American League manager of the year for the 2nd straight year while Gabe Kapler of the San Francisco Giants was named National League manager of the year.
- November 17: The voting was close in the National League CY Young Award but Corbin Burnes took the honors over Zack Wheeler by 10 votes, while the American League Cy Young award was won by Robbie Ray.
- November 18: Adolis Garcia was named the American League rookie of the year while Jonathan India was named the National League rookie of the year.
- November 19: The Cleveland Indians officially rename their team to become the Cleveland Guardians.
- (Tentative) – Deadline to file lists for all Major and Minor League levels
- Immediately after World Series: Eligible players become free agents.
  - Two days after start of the last game of the World Series: Trading window reopens.
  - Fifth day after end of World Series: Deadline for clubs to make qualifying offers to their eligible players who become free agents.
  - Sixth day after end of World Series: First day on which free agents may sign contracts with a club other than their former clubs.
  - 12th day after end of World Series: Last day for article XX (B) free agents to accept qualifying offer from a former club (midnight ET).
- Sensational two-way player Shohei Ohtani was named the American League MVP while Bryce Harper was named the National League MVP.
- November 22: The ballot for the National Baseball Hall of Fame class of 2022 was announced, with 13 players appearing on the ballot for the first time.

=== December ===
- December 1: The most recent Collective Bargaining Agreement (CBA) expired. As a result, MLB owners voted to lock out players starting the next day. It was the first labor stoppage since the 1994–95 Major League Baseball strike.
- December 6–9: Winter Meetings (MLB portion canceled)
- December 9: Rule 5 Draft (postponed)

== Deaths ==
=== January ===
- January 8 – Tommy Lasorda, 93, Hall of Fame manager of the Los Angeles Dodgers from 1976 to 1996 who won World Series titles in 1981 and 1988.
- January 19 – Don Sutton, 75, Hall of Fame pitcher who won 324 games for seven major league teams over 23 seasons with 3,574 strikeouts, later a color commentator for Atlanta Braves games on TBS.
- January 22 – Hank Aaron, 86, Hall of Fame right fielder who played 22 seasons for the Milwaukee and Atlanta Braves and Milwaukee Brewers from 1954 to 1976 whose 755 home runs stood as the record until 2007.

=== February ===
- February 3 – Wayne Terwilliger, 96, second baseman who played 12 seasons for five major league teams from 1949 to 1960.
- February 16 – Lew Krausse Jr., 77, pitcher who played twelve seasons for five major league teams from 1961 to 1974.
- February 20 – Stan Williams, 84, pitcher who played 14 seasons for six major league teams from 1958 to 1972.

=== March ===
- March 3 – Joe Altobelli, 88, minor and major league manager, skipper of the 1983 World Series champion Baltimore Orioles.
- March 8 – Rhéal Cormier, 53, pitcher who played 16 seasons for five major league teams from 1991 to 2007.
- March 14 – Frankie de la Cruz, 37, pitcher who played four seasons for four major league teams from 2007 to 2011, and also played one season each in Japan and Taiwan.
- March 25 – Dr. Bobby Brown, 96, former third baseman for the New York Yankees from 1946 to 1954 and later president of the American League from 1984 to 1994.
- March 26 – Mike Bell, 46, third baseman who played for the Cincinnati Reds in 2000 who was also the bench coach for the Minnesota Twins at the time of his death and whose grandfather Gus Bell, father Buddy Bell and brother David Bell all played in the majors.

=== April ===
- April 1 – Ken Reitz, 69, third baseman who played 11 seasons for the St. Louis Cardinals, San Francisco Giants, Chicago Cubs and Pittsburgh Pirates from 1972 to 1982 while winning a Gold Glove Award in 1975 and making the National League All-Star team in 1980.
- April 7 – Jack Smith, 85, pitcher who played for two major league teams from 1962 to 1964.
- April 20 – Tom Robson, 75, First Baseman who played for the Texas Rangers from September 1974 to September 1975.
- April 22 – Adrian Garrett, 78, catcher, first baseman and outfielder and played for 5 different major league teams from 1966 to 1976 and for a pro team in Japan from 1977 to 1979.

=== May ===
- May 4 – Ray Miller, 76, manager and coach for three teams between 1978 and 2005.
- May 5 – Del Crandall, 91, 8-time All-Star catcher for the Boston and Milwaukee Braves, San Francisco Giants, Pittsburgh Pirates, Cleveland Indians from 1949 to 1966 and manager of the Milwaukee Brewers and Seattle Mariners from 1972 to 1975 and 1983 to 1984, respectively.
- May 18 – Rennie Stennett, 72, second baseman for the Pittsburgh Pirates and San Francisco Giants from 1971 to 1981.
- May 20 – Phil Lombardi, 58, played for three seasons for both the Yankees and the Mets from 1986 to 1989.
- May 22 – Joe Beckwith, 66, pitcher who played for eight seasons with the Los Angeles Dodgers and Kansas City Royals from 1979 to 1986. He won a World Series championship with the Royals in 1985.
- May 31 – Mike Marshall, 78, relief pitcher who became the first reliever ever to win the Cy Young Award with the 1974 Los Angeles Dodgers while also making a record 106 pitching appearances that same year.

=== June ===
- June 3 – Tim Tolman, 65, utility player who spent seven seasons with two teams: five years with the Houston Astros and two years with the Detroit Tigers.
- June 11 – Art Ditmar, 92, pitcher who played nine seasons for two major league teams with the New York Yankees and the Kansas City Athletics from 1954 to 1962.
- June 11 – Mudcat Grant, 85, pitcher who played 14 seasons from 1958 to 1971 who also won an American League-best 21 games for the 1965 pennant-winning Minnesota Twins.
- June 30 – Yasunori Oshima, 70, Nippon Professional Baseball player and manager.

=== July ===
- July 7 – Ted Wieand, 88, pitcher for 2 seasons who played from 1958 to 1960 with the Cincinnati Reds and spent the last four seasons in the Minor Leagues.
- July 10 – Dick Tidrow, 74, pitcher for 13 seasons played for four major league teams from 1972 to 1984 with the NY Yankees, Chicago Cubs, Chicago White Sox and NY Mets and won 2 World Series with the NY Yankees before retiring in May 1984.
- July 22 – Tim Talton, 82, catcher who played for the Kansas City A's in 1966 and 1967 before the franchise moved to Oakland for the 1968 season.

=== August ===
- August 4 – J. R. Richard, 71, All-Star pitcher who played 10 seasons with the Houston Astros, guiding them to their first playoff appearance and NL West title in 1980.
- August 18 – Solly Drake, 90, outfielder who played only 2 seasons for 3 major league teams Philadelphia Phillies, Chicago Cubs, and Los Angeles Dodgers.
- August 19 – Bill Freehan, 79, 11-time All-Star catcher for 15 seasons with the Detroit Tigers, and member of the 1968 World Series champions.

=== September ===
- September 15 – Satoshi Hirayama, 91, one of the first Japanese-American players to sign a contract with a major league team (St. Louis Browns), but he only played in Japan, spending 10 seasons with the Hiroshima Carp.
- September 20 – Cloyd Boyer, 94, pitcher for five seasons with the St. Louis Cardinals and Kansas City Athletics, between 1949 and 1955. He was also a pitching coach after his playing career.
- September 29 – Charlie Lindstrom, 85, catcher who appeared in one game for the 1958 Chicago White Sox; he had two plate appearances; career was mostly in the minor leagues.

=== October ===
- October 2 – Chuck Hartenstein, 79, pitcher for five teams during 13 seasons spanning 1965 to 1977 after a college career at the University of Texas.
- October 4 – Eddie Robinson, 100, first baseman for seven teams from 1942 to 1957, later general manager for the Texas Rangers; the oldest living player at the time of his death.
- October 13 – Ray Fosse, 74, All-Star catcher for the Cleveland Indians, Oakland Athletics, Seattle Mariners and Milwaukee Brewers from 1967 to 1979, and longtime color commentator for the Oakland Athletics.
- October 30 – Jerry Remy, 68, second baseman for the California Angels and Boston Red Sox from 1975 to 1984, and longtime color commentator for Red Sox games, primarily with New England Sports Network.

=== November ===
- November 8 – Pedro Feliciano, 45, relief pitcher for the New York Mets and Fukuoka Daiei Hawks from 2002 to 2013.
- November 11 – Art Stewart, 94, front office executive and director of scouting for the Kansas City Royals from 1969 to 2021 who started his scouting career in 1953 with the New York Yankees.
- November 15 – Julio Lugo, 45, shortstop with seven major league teams during a 12-year career; member of the Boston Red Sox championship team in 2007.
- November 22 – Doug Jones, 64, 5-time All-Star closer who saved 303 games for seven teams over 15 seasons from 1982 to 2000.
- November 23 – Bill Virdon, 90, outfielder for the St. Louis Cardinals and Pittsburgh Pirates from 1955 to 1968 and manager for the Pirates, New York Yankees, Houston Astros and Montreal Expos from 1972 to 1984.
- November 29 – LaMarr Hoyt, 66, All-Star pitcher who played for eight years for the Chicago White Sox and the San Diego Padres; led the league in wins twice and won the 1983 American League Cy Young Award.

=== December ===
- December 4 − Ron Blazier, 50, pitcher who made his major league debut in 1996 with the Philadelphia Phillies and played for them for two seasons.
- December 12 − Roland Hemond, 92, longtime executive with several teams including the Chicago White Sox, Baltimore Orioles, and Arizona Diamondbacks; 2011 recipient of the Buck O'Neil Lifetime Achievement Award.
- December 20 − Kimera Bartee, 49, outfielder for the Detroit Tigers, Cincinnati Reds and Colorado Rockies from 1996 to 2001 and coach for the Pittsburgh Pirates, Philadelphia Phillies and the Tigers.
