= Elitserien (baseball) =

Swedish professional baseball

- Upcoming season or competition: 2026
- Sport: Baseball
- First season: 1963
- No. of teams: 5
- Country: Sweden
- Headquarters: Stockholm, Sweden
- Most recent champion: Rättvik Butchers (2026)
- Most titles: Leksand Lumberjacks (23)
- Relegation to: Regionserien
- Website: baseboll-softboll.se

Elitserien, meaning "the Elite League", is the top-tier professional baseball league in Sweden. Established in 1963, it is organized by the Swedish Baseball, Softball, and Lacrosse Association.

== Format ==
During the regular season, teams compete for playoff berths and the chance to win the Elitserien Cup Championship. At the season’s conclusion, the team finishing last must contest a relegation playoff against the top team from the Regional Series.

== Teams ==
The league typically features six teams, though the exact number has varied over time.

Team	Location	Field	Founded
Karlskoga Båts	(Örebro County) Karlskoga	Karlskoga IP	1992
Leksand Lumberjacks	(Dalarna County) Leksand	Leander Field	1959
Rättvik Butchers	(Dalarna County) Rättvik	Butcher Field	1975
Stockholm Monarchs	Stockholm	Skarpnäck Baseballpark	1990
Sundbyberg Heat	(Stockholm County) Sundbyberg	Örvallen	1972

== Past Swedish champions ==
Year	Champions
1963	Solna
1964	Leksand
1965	Wasa
1966	Wasa
1967	Leksand
1968	Leksand
1969	Leksand
1970	Leksand
1971	Leksand
1972	Leksand
1973	Bagarmossen
1974	Bagarmossen
1975	Leksand
1976	Bagarmossen
1977	Bagarmossen
1978	Leksand
1979	Leksand
1980	Bagarmossen
1981	Leksand
1982	Leksand
1983	Leksand
1984	Sundbyberg

Year	Champions
1985	Sundbyberg
1986	Sundbyberg
1987	Leksand
1988	Leksand
1989	Skellefteå
1990	Skellefteå
1991	Skellefteå
1992	Skellefteå
1993	Skellefteå
1994	Skellefteå
1995	Skellefteå
1996	Leksand
1997	Leksand
1998	Leksand
1999	Skellefteå
2000	Alby
2001	Rättvik
2002	Rättvik
2003	Sundbyberg
2004	Leksand
2005	Leksand
2006	Sundbyberg

Year	Champions
2007	Karlskoga
2008	Stockholm
2009	Stockholm
2010	Stockholm
2011	Stockholm
2012	Karlskoga
2013	Stockholm
2014	Stockholm
2015	Stockholm
2016	Leksand
2017	Sölvesborg
2018	Leksand
2019	Sölvesborg
2020	Sölvesborg
2021	Leksand
2022	Rättvik
2023	Rättvik
2024	Rättvik
2025	Rättvik
2026	Rättvik

=== Most Successful Team ===
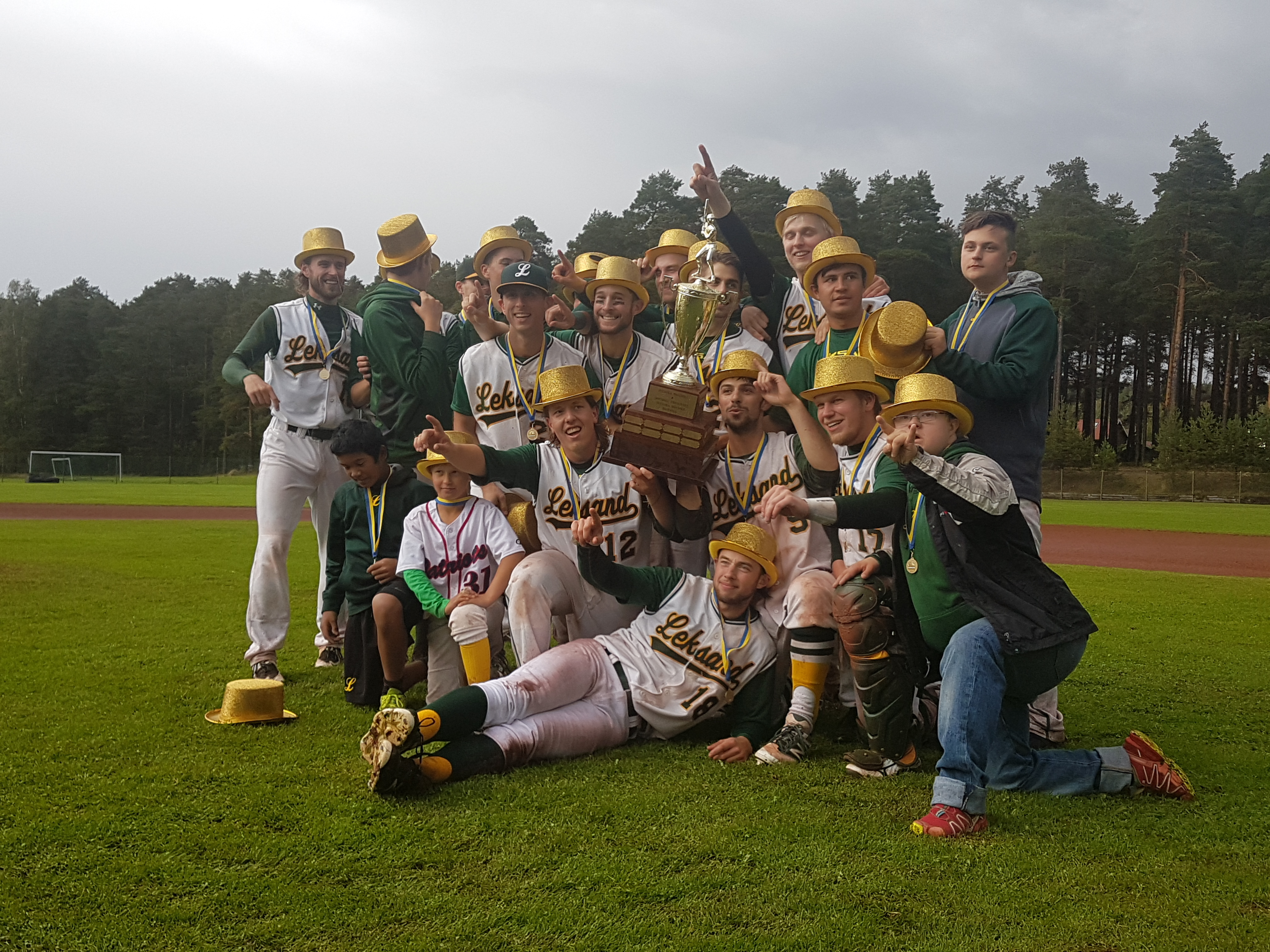
The Leksand Lumberjacks, winning their 21st title in 2016

With 23 championships, the Leksand Lumberjacks have the most league titles.

== See also ==
- List of sporting events in Sweden
- Baseball awards § Sweden
- Baseball awards § Europe
