= 2020 in baseball =

The following are the baseball events of the year 2020 throughout the world.

== Champions ==
=== Major League Baseball ===
Wild Card Series (ALWCS, NLWCS)	Division Series (ALDS, NLDS)
1	Tampa Bay	2
8	Toronto	0
1	Tampa Bay	3
5	NY Yankees	2
4	Cleveland	0
5	NY Yankees	2
American League
3	Minnesota	0
6	Houston	2
6	Houston	3
2	Oakland	1
2	Oakland	2
7	Chicago White Sox	1
1	LA Dodgers	2
8	Milwaukee	0
1	LA Dodgers	3
4	San Diego	0
4	San Diego	2
5	St. Louis	1
National League
3	Chicago Cubs	0
6	Miami	2
6	Miami	0
2	Atlanta	3
2	Atlanta	2
7	Cincinnati	0

League Championship Series (ALCS, NLCS)
1	Tampa Bay	4
6	Houston	3
1	LA Dodgers	4
2	Atlanta	3

World Series
AL1	Tampa Bay	2
NL1	LA Dodgers	4

=== Other Champions ===
- Independent baseball leagues
  - American Association: Milwaukee Milkmen
  - Constellation Energy League: Sugar Land Skeeters
  - Empire League: Baseball Brilliance Sox
  - Pecos League: Tucson Saguaros
  - United Shore League: Utica Unicorns

== International competition ==
- International club team competitions
  - Caribbean Series: Toros del Este
- Domestic Summer Leagues
  - Chinese Professional Baseball League—Taiwan Series: Uni-President Lions
  - Finnish Baseball Championship: Espoo Expos
  - German League: Heidenheim Heideköpfe
  - Irish Baseball League: Mariners Baseball
  - Italian Baseball League: Unipol Bologna
  - KBO League—Korean Series: NC Dinos
  - Nippon Professional Baseball—Japan Series: Fukuoka SoftBank Hawks
    - Pacific League: Fukuoka SoftBank Hawks
    - Central League: Yomiuri Giants
  - Spanish League: Astros Valencia
  - Swedish League: Sölvesborg Firehawks
- Domestic Winter Leagues
  - Australian Baseball League: Melbourne Aces
  - Colombian League: Vaqueros de Montería
  - Cuban National Series: Matanzas
  - Dominican League: Toros del Este
  - Mexican Pacific League: Tomateros de Culiacán
  - Nicaraguan League: Leones de León
  - Panamanian League: Astronautas de Chiriquí
  - Puerto Rican League: Cangrejeros de Santurce
  - Venezuelan League: Cardenales de Lara

== Cancelled events ==
The following events and seasons scheduled to be played this year were cancelled or postponed to the following year as a result of the COVID-19 pandemic.

=== International tournaments ===
- 2020 Summer Olympics: Postponed to 2021
- European Cup: Cancelled
- Grand Forks International: Cancelled
- Haarlem Baseball Week: Cancelled
- U-15 Baseball World Cup: Postponed
- Women's Baseball World Cup: Postponed
- World Baseball Classic: Postponed to March 2023

=== Domestic seasons ===
- Minor League Baseball: All leagues cancelled.
- Arizona Fall League: Cancelled
- Atlantic League of Professional Baseball: Cancelled
- Frontier League: Cancelled
- Pacific Association: Cancelled

=== College ===
- 2020 College World Series: Cancelled
- 2020 NCAA Division II baseball tournament: Cancelled
- 2020 NCAA Division III baseball tournament: Cancelled
- NAIA World Series: Cancelled
- JUCO World Series: Cancelled
- Cape Cod League: Cancelled

=== Little League tournaments ===
- Intermediate League World Series: Cancelled
- Junior League World Series: Cancelled
- Little League World Series: Cancelled
- Senior League World Series: Cancelled

=== National leagues ===
- Dutch Baseball League: Season terminated with no champion declared.
- French League: Cancelled

== Awards and honors ==
=== Major League Baseball ===
- Baseball Hall of Fame honors

== Events ==
=== January ===
- January 21 – Derek Jeter and Larry Walker are voted into the Baseball Hall of Fame by the Baseball Writers' Association of America. Jeter is named on all but one of the 397 votes cast or 99.7 percent; he misses joining 2019 inductee Mariano Rivera as unanimous Hall of Fame inductees. Meanwhile, Walker receives 304 votes, or 76.6 percent, in his 10th and final year on the ballot. Curt Schilling, Roger Clemens and Barry Bonds, all in their eighth year on the ballot, are the only other players to be named on 60 percent of the vote at 70.0, 61.0 and 60.7 respectively.
- January 26 – John Altobelli, coach of the Orange Coast College baseball team is killed in a helicopter crash in Calabasas, California that also kills NBA legend Kobe Bryant, his 13-year-old daughter Gianna and 6 others.

=== February ===
- February 4 – The Philadelphia Phillies announce that they will retire Roy Halladay's number 34 on May 29, Halladay who was killed in a plane crash in November 2017 will be the ninth team member to have his number retired. It will be retired on the 10th anniversary of Halladay's perfect game.
- February 26 – Due to the COVID-19 pandemic in Japan, NPB announced that their remaining 72 preseason games would be held behind closed doors and would not allow spectators to attend.

=== March ===
- March 9 – NPB announces the postponement the March 20 start of the regular season because of coronavirus. The league ultimately set its return date for June 19.
- March 12 – MLB cancelled the remaining spring training games and announced that the start of the regular season would be delayed indefinitely, due to the coronavirus pandemic.

=== April ===
- April 12 – 2020 Chinese Professional Baseball League season

=== May ===
- May 5 – 2020 KBO League season

=== June ===
- June 10–11 – 2020 Major League Baseball draft
- June 19 – 2020 Nippon Professional Baseball season
- June 23 – Major League Baseball announces its plan for a 60-game regular season, including several rule changes – most notably, the universal designated hitter. Schedules will include 40 games against division opponents and 20 games against the corresponding division in the other league, i.e. A.L. East vs. N.L. East. Players will receive a pro-rated salary of approximately 37 percent.
- June 30 – Minor League Baseball announces the cancellation of its season.

=== July ===
- July 1 – First day of MLB Summer Camps, also known as "Spring Training 2.0".
- July 10 – NPB begins allowing up to 5,000 fans in attendance at each game.
- July 22 – Mookie Betts signs a 12-year, $365 million contract extension with the Los Angeles Dodgers.
- July 23 – MLB announces an expanded playoff structure that includes eight teams from each league, up from five in previous seasons.
- July 23 – 2020 Major League Baseball season begins with the Washington Nationals and the New York Yankees. Dr. Anthony Fauci throws out the ceremonial first pitch at Nationals Park with no fans in attendance. Nationals outfielder Juan Soto is left off the Opening Day roster after testing positive for COVID-19.
- July 27 – Two games are postponed after as many as 13 members of the Miami Marlins test positive for COVID-19. The Marlins, who had just finished a three-game series in Philadelphia, were scheduled to return home to face the Baltimore Orioles. The Phillies' game against the New York Yankees is also postponed.

=== August ===
- August 13- Mookie Betts ties an MLB record with his sixth three homer game.
- August 25 - At Guaranteed Rate Field, Lucas Giolito of the Chicago White Sox no-hits the Pittsburgh Pirates 4–0. He strikes out 13 batters and yields only one baserunner, a walk to Erik González in the fourth inning. Due to the COVID-19 pandemic, the no-hitter is the first to be pitched in a game without fans. The no-hitter is the 19th in White Sox history, the most recent having been Philip Humber's perfect game on April 21, 2012, and the most recent by a White Sox at Guaranteed Rate Field since Mark Buehrle's perfect game on July 23, 2009.
- August 30 - In defeating the Cincinnati Reds 10–1 at Great American Ball Park, the Chicago Cubs become the first team to have all three of its starting outfielders hit two home runs in one game. Left fielder Kyle Schwarber, center fielder Ian Happ and right fielder Jason Heyward hit the home runs; the former's second is a grand slam in the ninth inning. The Cubs also have three players homer twice in the same game for the first time since April 16, 1955; in that game, Ernie Banks, Randy Jackson and Dee Fondy each had hit two home runs in a 12–11 loss to the St. Louis Cardinals.

=== September ===
- September 9 – The Atlanta Braves defeat of the Miami Marlins by a score of 29–9 becomes the first Scorigami (a final score that has never occurred before) in MLB since 1999.
- September 13 – At Miller Park, Alec Mills of the Chicago Cubs no-hits the Milwaukee Brewers, 12–0. He throws 74 of 114 pitches for strikes, walking three and striking out five for the 16th no-hitter in Cubs history. Jake Arrieta had pitched the Cubs' last no-hitter prior to this game, doing so for the second of his second career on April 21, 2016. The no-hitter is also the Cubs' second at Miller Park, Carlos Zambrano having pitched it against the Houston Astros almost a full 12 years earlier, on September 14, 2008; that game had been moved to Milwaukee from Houston due to Hurricane Ike.

=== October ===
- October 27 – At Globe Life Field in Arlington, Texas the Los Angeles Dodgers defeat the Tampa Bay Rays 3–1 in Game 6 of the 2020 World Series to win the series 4–2. Corey Seager wins the World Series MVP.

=== November ===
- November 5 – Evan White of the Seattle Mariners and Anthony Rizzo of the Chicago Cubs won their first ever Golden Glove Awards.
- November 10 – Kyle Lewis of the Seattle Mariners and Devin Williams of the Milwaukee Brewers Respectively win the AL And NL Rookies of the Year.
- November 11 – Shane Bieber of the Cleveland Indians and Trevor Bauer of the Cincinnati Reds Respectively win the AL And NL CY Young Awards.
- November 12 – Jose Abreu of the Chicago White Sox and Freddie Freeman of the Atlanta Braves Respectively win the MLB MVP Awards.

== Deaths ==
=== January ===
- January 1 – Don Larsen, 90, pitcher renowned for his perfect game in the 1956 World Series, at the time of his death the only perfect game and no-hitter in World Series history; although most known as a New York Yankee, his MLB career lasted 14 years (1953–1965 and 1967) as a member of seven different clubs, compiling an 81–91 career record in 412 appearances.
- January 9 – David Glass, 85, owner of the Kansas City Royals from 2000 to 2019 who helped lead the team to back-to-back pennants in 2014 and 2015 while winning the World Series in the latter year.
- January 9 – Hal Smith, 89, infielder, catcher and utilityman for five clubs between 1955 and 1964, best known as a member of the 1960 World Series Pittsburgh Pirates.
- January 20 – Jay Hankins, 84, outfielder who played 86 games for the Kansas City Athletics (1961, 1963); later a scout and scouting director.
- January 28 – Don Hasenmayer, 92, infielder in 11 total games for 1945–1946 Philadelphia Phillies.

=== February ===
- February 4 – Gil Coan, 97, speedy outfielder who appeared in 918 games between 1946 and 1956 for Washington Senators, Baltimore Orioles, Chicago White Sox and New York Giants; placed in top ten among American League base-stealers six times between 1948 and 1954.
- February 4 – Dick Koecher, 93, left-handed pitcher who appeared in seven games during three trials for Philadelphia Phillies (1946–1948).
- February 11 – Katsuya Nomura, 84, Hall of Fame NPB catcher and manager who played for 26 seasons with three teams, primarily the Nankai Hawks, and managed four teams, including Yakult Swallows, who he led to three Japan Series titles.
- February 15 – Tony Fernández, 57, a shortstop who played for seven major league baseball franchises and winning a championship with the Toronto Blue Jays in 1993 and currently ranks first in Blue Jays history in hits and games played.
- February 23 – Ramón Conde, 85, third baseman and pinch hitter who appeared in 14 games for 1962 Chicago White Sox.
- February 28 – Johnny Antonelli, 89, left-handed pitcher primarily for the New York/San Francisco Giants who posted a 21–7 record with a National League best 2.30 ERA in 1954 while helping the team win the World Series that year.

=== March ===
- March 25 – William Bartholomay, 91, owner of the Braves from 1962 to 1975 who spearheaded the club's controversial move from Milwaukee to Atlanta, finally completed in 1966; continued to serve as Braves' board chairman after Ted Turner purchased the team.
- March 26 – Jimmy Wynn, 78, All-Star outfielder nicknamed the "Toy Cannon" who hit 291 home runs in 15 major league seasons, who was most prominently known for his time with the Houston Astros.

=== April ===
- April 6 – Al Kaline, 85, Hall of Fame right fielder who spent his entire 22-season career with the Detroit Tigers from 1953 to 1974, collecting 3,007 hits and hitting 399 home runs while winning 10 Gold Glove Awards along the way.
- April 12 – Jim Frey, 88, manager who led the Kansas City Royals to their first pennant in 1980 and the 1984 Chicago Cubs to their first postseason appearance in 39 years; he later led the Cubs to the playoffs again as general manager five years later; previously, a minor league outfielder and longtime Baltimore Orioles coach under Earl Weaver.
- April 15 – Dámaso García, 63, second baseman who played 12 seasons in Major League Baseball with the New York Yankees, Toronto Blue Jays, Atlanta Braves and Montreal Expos.

=== May ===
- May 1 – Matt Keough, 64, pitcher who played nine seasons in Major League Baseball, six of which with the Oakland Athletics, and three seasons in Nippon Professional Baseball with the Hanshin Tigers; son of Marty Keough.
- May 3 – Salty Saltwell, 96, longtime executive for Chicago Cubs who spent the 1976 season as the club's general manager.
- May 8 – Ben Johnson, 88, pitcher who appeared in 21 games for 1959–1960 Cubs.
- May 14 – Bob Watson, 74, first baseman-outfielder who played 19 seasons in Major League Baseball with the Houston Astros, Boston Red Sox, New York Yankees and Atlanta Braves who also became the first African-American general manager to win a World Series in 1996 with the Yankees.
- May 24 – Biff Pocoroba, 66, catcher who played 10 seasons in Major League Baseball, all with the Atlanta Braves.

=== June ===
- June 10 – Claudell Washington, 65, outfielder who played 17 seasons in Major League Baseball with seven different teams; two-time All-Star and member of the World Series champion 1974 Oakland Athletics.

=== July ===
- July 3 – Tyson Brummett, 35, pitcher who appeared in one game with the Philadelphia Phillies in 2012.
- July 28 – John McNamara, 88, manager for six different MLB teams over 19 seasons between 1969 and 1996; led Boston Red Sox to 1986 American League pennant, and Cincinnati Reds to 1979 NL West Division title.

=== August ===
- August 31 – Tom Seaver, 75, Hall of Fame pitcher for the New York Mets, Cincinnati Reds, Chicago White Sox and Boston Red Sox who won 311 games, struck out 3,640 batters, 1967 National League Rookie of the Year, and 3 Cy Young Awards during his career.

=== September ===
- September 6 – Lou Brock, 81, Hall of Fame outfielder for the Chicago Cubs and St. Louis Cardinals whose 938 stolen bases at the time of his retirement was the most all-time.
- September 12 – Mark Newman, 71, former college baseball coach who spent 26 years (1989–2014) with the New York Yankees in key player development and senior baseball operations posts.
- September 19 – Gary Hughes, 79, scout and front office executive for ten MLB organizations, notably the Florida Marlins and Chicago Cubs.
- September 28 – Jay Johnstone, 74, outfielder who played 20 seasons in Major League Baseball with eight different teams; member of 1978 New York Yankees and 1981 Los Angeles Dodgers World Championship teams.
- September 30 – Lou Johnson, 86, outfielder who played parts of 8 seasons in Major League Baseball with seven different teams, winning a World Championship with the 1965 Los Angeles Dodgers.

=== October ===
- October 2 – Bob Gibson, 84, Hall of Fame pitcher who spent his entire MLB career with the St. Louis Cardinals; nine-time All-Star, two-time World Series champion and MVP, two-time NL Cy Young Award winner, and 1968 NL MVP.
- October 2 – Ron Perranoski, 84, pitcher who played 13 seasons in MLB with the Los Angeles Dodgers, Minnesota Twins, Detroit Tigers and California Angels. Was the Dodgers pitching coach from 1981 to 1994 and a coach for the San Francisco Giants from 1997 to 1999.
- October 3 – Charlie Haeger, 37, knuckleball pitcher for three MLB teams from 2006 to 2010.
- October 7 – Kim Batiste, 52, infielder who spent parts of five seasons in MLB with the Philadelphia Phillies and San Francisco Giants.
- October 8 – Whitey Ford, 91, Hall of Fame pitcher nicknamed "The Chairman of the Board" spent his entire MLB career with the New York Yankees; ten-time All-Star, six-time World Series champion and 1961 World Series MVP, and AL Cy Young Award winner in 1961.
- October 11 – Joe Morgan, 77, Hall of Fame second baseman for the Cincinnati Reds who won back to back World Series in 1975 and 1976, being named NL MVP during both championship seasons, and ten-time All-Star.
- October 20 – Derryl Cousins, 74, Major League Baseball umpire whose career spanned 34 seasons.

=== November ===
- November 8 – Johnny Paredes, 58, second baseman who played parts of four seasons in MLB with the Montreal Expos and Detroit Tigers.
- November 12 – Paul Schrieber, 54, umpire who officiated in 2,207 games in National League (1997–1999) and Major League Baseball (2000–2015), as well as the 2000 and 2015 All-Star contests.

=== December ===
- December 7 – Dick Allen, 78, slugger who played 15 seasons in MLB, winning the National League Rookie of the Year in 1964 with the Philadelphia Phillies and the American League MVP in 1972 with the Chicago White Sox.
- December 26 – Phil Niekro, 81, Hall of Fame knuckleball pitcher who played 24 seasons in MLB, 20 of them with the Milwaukee/Atlanta Braves; five-time All-Star.
