= Baseball Finnish Championship Series =

Superbaseball
- Sport: Baseball
- Founded: 1981
- No. of teams: 5
- Country: Finland
- Most recent champion: Helsinki Puumat
- Most titles: Espoo Expos (20)
- Website: www.baseball.fi/sarjat/superbaseball/

Superbaseball (formerly the Baseball Finnish Championship Series; Finnish: Baseballin SM-sarja) has been played in Finland since 1981. The championship currently consists of five teams. The winner represents Finland in the following year’s CEB European Cup tournament.

== History ==
The first year of the Finnish Championship Series was 1981, in which the championship was won by the Hawks from Helsinki. The Hawks merged with Helsingin Pallotoverit and the team won under the name Wranglers also in 1982. After the 1982 season the team changed its name to Puumat (Pumas) and has been one of the most successful clubs and the only club to remain from the 1980s; and still plays currently. Due to the recession, the 1992 season was not played, and the history of baseball can be divided between pre-1992 and post 1992.

== League format ==
The season starts in early May and is completed by early September. Currently, there are five teams in the top league. Each team in Superbaseball plays 15 games, facing every other team five times. The top two teams meet in a best-of-five Championship Series.

== Current Teams ==
- Espoo Expos
- Helsinki Mets
- Helsinki Puumat
- Tampere Tigers
- Lintuvaara XL5

== Champions ==
- 1981 Helsinki Hawks (Puumat)
- 1982 Helsinki Wranglers (Puumat)
- 1983 Helsinki Puumat
- 1984 Helsinki Puumat
- 1985 Helsinki Kintaro
- 1986 Espoo Baseball Softball Club (EBSC)
- 1987 Helsinki Puumat
- 1988 Helsinki Devils
- 1989 Helsinki Devils
- 1990 Helsinki Devils
- 1991 Helsinki Puumat
- 1992 (not played)
- 1993 Helsinki Puumat
- 1994 Riihimäki Pirajat
- 1995 Helsinki Puumat
- 1996 Espoo Athletics
- 1997 Espoo Athletics
- 1998 Espoo Athletics
- 1999 Helsinki Puumat
- 2000 Espoo Athletics
- 2001 Espoo Athletics
- 2002 Helsinki Icebreakers
- 2003 Espoo Expos
- 2004 Espoo Expos
- 2005 Espoo Expos
- 2006 Espoo Expos
- 2007 Espoo Expos
- 2008 Espoo Expos
- 2009 Espoo Expos
- 2010 Espoo Expos
- 2011 Espoo Expos
- 2012 Espoo Expos
- 2013 Espoo Expos
- 2014 Espoo Expos
- 2015 Espoo Expos
- 2016 Espoo Expos
- 2017 Espoo Expos
- 2018 Helsinki Mets
- 2019 Espoo Expos
- 2020 Espoo Expos
- 2021 Tampere Tigers
- 2022 Espoo Expos
- 2023 Espoo Expos
- 2024 Espoo Expos
- 2025 Tampere Tigers
- 2026 Helsinki Puumat

== Championships won by team ==
- 20 Espoo Expos
- 10 Helsinki Puumat (Hawks/Wranglers)
- 5 Espoo Athletics
- 3 Helsinki Devils
- 2 Tampere Tigers
- 1 Helsinki Kintaro
- 1 Espoo Baseball Softball Club (EBSC)
- 1 Riihimäki Piraijat
- 1 Helsinki Icebreakers
- 1 Helsinki Mets
