= 2022 in baseball =

The following are the baseball events of the year 2022 throughout the world.

== International competition ==
=== National team tournaments ===
- U-12 Baseball World Cup: United States
- U-15 Baseball World Cup: United States
- U-18 Baseball World Cup: United States
- U-23 Baseball World Cup: Japan
- Baseball5 World Cup: Cuba
- Haarlem Baseball Week: Netherlands

=== Club team tournaments ===
- 2022 Caribbean Series: Caimanes de Barranquilla
- European Cup: Parma Baseball Club
- Grand Forks International: Seattle Studs

== North American domestic leagues ==
=== Major League Baseball ===
Wild Card Series (ALWCS, NLWCS)
4	Toronto	0
5	Seattle	2
3	Cleveland	2
6	Tampa Bay	0
4	NY Mets	1
5	San Diego	2
3	St. Louis	0
6	Philadelphia	2

Division Series (ALDS, NLDS)
1	Houston	3
5	Seattle	0
American League
2	NY Yankees	3
3	Cleveland	2
1	LA Dodgers	1
5	San Diego	3
National League
2	Atlanta	1
6	Philadelphia	3

Championship Series (ALCS, NLCS)
1	Houston	4
2	NY Yankees	0
5	San Diego	1
6	Philadelphia	4

World Series
AL1	Houston	4
NL6	Philadelphia	2

==== Standings ====
===== American League =====
AL East
Team	W	L	Pct.	GB	Home	Road
^{(2)} New York Yankees	99	63	.611	—	57‍–‍24	42‍–‍39
^{(4)} Toronto Blue Jays	92	70	.568	7	47‍–‍34	45‍–‍36
^{(6)} Tampa Bay Rays	86	76	.531	13	51‍–‍30	35‍–‍46
Baltimore Orioles	83	79	.512	16	45‍–‍36	38‍–‍43
Boston Red Sox	78	84	.481	21	43‍–‍38	35‍–‍46

AL Central
Team	W	L	Pct.	GB	Home	Road
^{(3)} Cleveland Guardians	92	70	.568	—	46‍–‍35	46‍–‍35
Chicago White Sox	81	81	.500	11	37‍–‍44	44‍–‍37
Minnesota Twins	78	84	.481	14	46‍–‍35	32‍–‍49
Detroit Tigers	66	96	.407	26	36‍–‍46	30‍–‍50
Kansas City Royals	65	97	.401	27	39‍–‍42	26‍–‍55

AL West
Team	W	L	Pct.	GB	Home	Road
^{(1)} Houston Astros	106	56	.654	—	55‍–‍26	51‍–‍30
^{(5)} Seattle Mariners	90	72	.556	16	46‍–‍35	44‍–‍37
Los Angeles Angels	73	89	.451	33	40‍–‍41	33‍–‍48
Texas Rangers	68	94	.420	38	34‍–‍47	34‍–‍47
Oakland Athletics	60	102	.370	46	29‍–‍51	31‍–‍51

===== National League =====
NL East
Team	W	L	Pct.	GB	Home	Road
^{(2)} Atlanta Braves	101	61	.623	—	55‍–‍26	46‍–‍35
^{(4)} New York Mets	101	61	.623	—	54‍–‍27	47‍–‍34
^{(6)} Philadelphia Phillies	87	75	.537	14	47‍–‍34	40‍–‍41
Miami Marlins	69	93	.426	32	34‍–‍47	35‍–‍46
Washington Nationals	55	107	.340	46	26‍–‍55	29‍–‍52

NL Central
Team	W	L	Pct.	GB	Home	Road
^{(3)} St. Louis Cardinals	93	69	.574	—	53‍–‍28	40‍–‍41
Milwaukee Brewers	86	76	.531	7	46‍–‍35	40‍–‍41
Chicago Cubs	74	88	.457	19	37‍–‍44	37‍–‍44
Pittsburgh Pirates	62	100	.383	31	34‍–‍47	28‍–‍53
Cincinnati Reds	62	100	.383	31	33‍–‍48	29‍–‍52

NL West
Team	W	L	Pct.	GB	Home	Road
^{(1)} Los Angeles Dodgers	111	51	.685	—	57‍–‍24	54‍–‍27
^{(5)} San Diego Padres	89	73	.549	22	44‍–‍37	45‍–‍36
San Francisco Giants	81	81	.500	30	44‍–‍37	37‍–‍44
Arizona Diamondbacks	74	88	.457	37	40‍–‍41	34‍–‍47
Colorado Rockies	68	94	.420	43	41‍–‍40	27‍–‍54

=== Minor League Baseball ===
- Triple–A
  - International League: Durham Bulls (Tampa Bay Rays)
  - Pacific Coast League: Reno Aces (Arizona Diamondbacks)
    - Triple-A National Championship Game: Durham Bulls (Tampa Bay Rays)
- Double–A
  - Eastern League: Somerset Patriots (New York Yankees)
  - Southern League: Pensacola Blue Wahoos (Miami Marlins)
  - Texas League: Frisco RoughRiders (Texas Rangers)
- High–A
  - Midwest League: South Bend Cubs (Chicago Cubs)
  - Northwest League: Eugene Emeralds (San Francisco Giants)
  - South Atlantic League: Bowling Green Hot Rods (Tampa Bay Rays)
- Single–A
  - California League: Lake Elsinore Storm (San Diego Padres)
  - Carolina League: Charleston RiverDogs (Tampa Bay Rays)
  - Florida State League: St. Lucie Mets (New York Mets)
- Rookie
  - Arizona Complex League: ACL Giants (San Francisco Giants)
  - Dominican Summer League: DSL Phillies White (Philadelphia Phillies)
  - Florida Complex League: FCL Yankees (New York Yankees)
- Fall League
  - Arizona Fall League: Surprise Saguaros

=== MLB Partner Leagues ===
- American Association of Professional Baseball: Fargo-Moorhead RedHawks
- Atlantic League of Professional Baseball: Lancaster Barnstormers
- Frontier League: Québec Capitales
- Pioneer League: Grand Junction Rockies

=== Independent baseball leagues ===
- Empire Professional Baseball League: Tupper Lake Riverpigs
- Pecos League: Roswell Invaders
- United Shore Professional Baseball League: Birmingham-Bloomfield Beavers

=== College baseball ===
- 2022 College World Series: Ole Miss Rebels
- NCAA Division II: North Greenville Crusaders
- NCAA Division III: Eastern Connecticut Warriors
- NAIA: Southeastern Fire
- Junior College World Series:
  - Division I: Central Arizona College
  - Division II: Pearl River Community College
  - Division III: Herkimer County Community College

=== Collegiate Summer Baseball Leagues ===
- Appalachian League: Kingsport Axmen
- Cape Cod League: Bourne Braves
- MLB Draft League: West Virginia Black Bears
- New England Collegiate Baseball League: Martha's Vineyard Sharks

=== Little League ===
- Senior League World Series: Radamés López Little League (Guayama, Puerto Rico)
- Junior League World Series: Chung Shan Little League (Taichung, Taiwan)
- Intermediate League World Series: Danville Little League (Danville, California)
- Little League World Series: Honolulu Little League (Honolulu, Hawaii)

== Other domestic leagues ==
=== Summer leagues ===
- Chinese Professional Baseball League—Taiwan Series: CTBC Brothers
- Cuban National Series: Alazanes de Granma
- Dutch League—Holland Series: HCAW Bussum
- Finnish League: Espoo Expos
- French League: Huskies de Rouen
- German League: Bonn Capitals
- Irish League: Ashbourne Giants
- Italian League: San Marino Baseball Club
- KBO League—Korean Series: SSG Landers
- Nippon Professional Baseball—Japan Series: Orix Buffaloes
  - Central League: Tokyo Yakult Swallows
  - Pacific League: Orix Buffaloes
- Mexican League: Leones de Yucatán
- Spanish League: Tenerife Marlins
- Swedish League: Rättvik Butchers

=== Winter leagues ===
- Australian Baseball League: season cancelled
- Colombian League: Caimanes de Barranquilla
- Dominican League: Gigantes del Cibao
- Mexican Pacific League: Charros de Jalisco
- Nicaraguan League: Leones de León
- Panamanian League: Astronautas de Los Santos
- Puerto Rican League: Criollos de Caguas
- Venezuelan League: Navegantes del Magallanes

== Awards and honors ==
=== Major League Baseball ===
- Baseball Hall of Fame honors

In voting by the Baseball Writers' Association of America (BBWAA), David Ortiz was selected for induction to the National Baseball Hall of Fame. Ortiz and other honorees composing the class of 2022 were honored in ceremonies in Cooperstown, New York, scheduled for July 24, 2022.

== Events ==
=== January ===
- The year began with Major League Baseball in a work-stoppage, due to the 2021–22 Major League Baseball lockout.
- January 9 – Rachel Balkovec was hired as manager of the New York Yankees' Low-A Southeast affiliate, the Tampa Tarpons, making her the first woman to hold this position in the affiliated minor leagues.
- January 25 – David Ortiz is elected to the National Baseball Hall of Fame and Museum in his first year of eligibility.

=== February ===
- February 18 – the 2022 NCAA Division I baseball season began.

=== March ===
- March 1 – Major League Baseball and the Major League Baseball Players Association fail to meet an agreement on a new collective bargaining agreement by the league's imposed 5:00 p.m. EST (UTC−05:00) deadline, thus triggering the cancellation (later degraded to postponement) of every team's first two series, a total of 91 games. The cancellations push the league's opening day back to April.
- March 10 – Major League Baseball and the Major League Baseball Players Association agree on new a deal, ending a 99-day lockout.
- March 31 – The 2022 Major League Baseball season was originally scheduled to begin.

=== April ===
- April 2 – the 2022 Chinese Professional Baseball League season begins.
- April 7 – Opening Day of Major League Baseball's 2022 season.
- April 10 – Chiba Lotte Marines pitcher Rōki Sasaki throws a perfect game, the first in 28 years and the 16th in NPB history. Sasaki tied an existing NPB record by striking out 19 batters, and setting a new record by striking out 13 consecutive batters.
- April 15 – Jackie Robinson Day.

=== May ===
- May 10: Los Angeles Angels rookie pitcher Reid Detmers throws a complete game no-hitter against the Tampa Bay Rays.

=== June ===
- June 17–28: 2022 College World Series

=== July ===
- July 19: 2022 Major League Baseball All-Star Game at Dodger Stadium in Los Angeles, California
- July 24: Induction ceremonies for the National Baseball Hall of Fame and Museum in Cooperstown, New York were held.

=== August ===
- August 2 (6 p.m. ET): MLB's postseason-eligible deadline for players acquired via trade
- August 18–28: The 2022 Little League World Series was held in South Williamsport, Pennsylvania.
- August 31: MLB's postseason-eligible deadline for players acquired via waiver claim

=== September ===
- September 1: MLB active rosters expanded from 26 to 28 players.

=== October ===
- October 5: End of the Major League Baseball regular season

=== Postseason ===
- October 7: American League Wild Card Series and National League Wild Card Series began.
- October 11: American League Division Series and National League Division Series began.
- October 18: National League Championship Series began.
- October 19: American League Championship Series began.
- October 28: 2022 World Series began.

=== November ===
- November 5: Houston Astros defeat the Philadelphia Phillies in Game 6 of the 2022 MLB World Series, for the championship.
- Immediately after World Series: Eligible players became free agents
- November 7: Trading window reopens.
- November 10: Deadline for clubs to make qualifying offers to their eligible players who became free agents
- November 11: First Day of free agents may sign contracts with a club other than a former club
- November 17: Last Day for article xx (B) free agents to accept a qualifying offer from a former club (Midnight ET.)

=== December ===
- December 5–8: Winter Meetings
- December 8: Rule 5 Draft
- December 30: Aaron Judge of the New York Yankees is named Associated Press Male Athlete of the Year.

== Deaths ==
=== January ===
- January 2 – Larry Biittner, 75, outfielder and first baseman from 1970 to 1983 for four major league franchises who hit .315 with the 1975 Expos, and enjoyed his best season with the 1977 Cubs, batting .298 with 62 RBI.
- January 4 – Jim Corsi, 60, relief pitcher for five major league teams from 1988 to 1999 with three stints for the Athletics, posting a 2.75 ERA in 159 games for the club, including the 1989 championship season; later a broadcaster.
- January 4 – Carl Linhart, 92, Slovak-born minor league outfielder who appeared in three games for the 1952 Tigers, batted .308 for Eastern League's Albany Senators in 1955.
- January 4 – Tom Matchick, 78, infielder for five American League teams including the 1968 World Series champion Tigers; was 5-time All-Star in minor leagues.
- January 7 – George Gerberman, 79, minor league pitcher who started one game for the 1962 Cubs, was 12-2 for Texas League's Amarillo Sonics in 1966.
- January 8 – Eddie Basinski, 99, middle infielder for the Dodgers and Pirates who hit .262 for Brooklyn in 1945; star for Portland Beavers from 1947 to 1957 elected to Pacific Coast League Hall of Fame in 2006.
- January 8 – Don Dillard, 85, outfielder for the Indians and Braves who hit .272 for Cleveland in 1961, batted .293 over ten minor league seasons.
- January 13 – Cholly Naranjo, 87, Cuban pitcher who made 17 appearances with the 1956 Pirates, pitched nine seasons in Cuban baseball.
- January 16 – Ethan Blackaby, 81, minor league outfielder who played 15 games with the Milwaukee Braves in 1962 and 1964; general manager of the Phoenix Giants from 1973 to 1986.
- January 16 – Gale Wade, 92, minor league outfielder who played 19 games with the Cubs in 1955 and 1956, led four different minor leagues in steals.
- January 17 – Roger Samuels, 61, relief pitcher for the 1988 Giants and 1989 Pirates.
- January 18 – Vic Roznovsky, 83, catcher for three major league teams including the 1966 World Series champion Orioles.
- January 21 - Bill Harrington, 95, pitcher for the Philadelphia & Kansas City Athletics between 1953 and 1956, MVP of the Southern Association in 1958 after winning 20 games.
- January 25 – David Green, 61, Nicaraguan outfielder and first baseman with the Cardinals and Giants who batted .283 for St. Louis' 1982 World Series champions.
- January 27 − Gene Clines, 75, outfielder who played for four teams throughout the 1970s, batting .308 for the 1971 World Series champion Pirates and .334 the following year, later a coach for 20 seasons with five clubs.
- January 30 − Jeff Innis, 59, relief pitcher for the Mets from 1987 to 1993, posting a 3.05 ERA in 288 games.
- January 31 – Jerry Snyder, 92, middle infielder for the Senators from 1952 to 1958 who hit .339 in 1953.

=== February ===
- February 2 – Bill Short, 84, pitcher for five teams in the 1960s who won three games for the 1960 American League champion Yankees after being named MVP of the International League in 1959.
- February 3 – John Sanders, 76, minor league outfielder who appeared in one game for the 1965 Kansas City A's, later coaching the University of Nebraska team for 20 years.
- February 8 – Gerald Williams, 55, outfielder for six teams from 1992 to 2005 who batted .305 for the 1998 Braves and was left fielder on the team's 1999 pennant winners.
- February 9 – Jeremy Giambi, 47, outfielder and first baseman for four teams from 1998 to 2003 who enjoyed his best seasons with A's division champions in 2000 and 2001.
- February 12 − Calvin Jones, 58, relief pitcher for the Mariners in 1991 and 1992 who later played in the Chinese Professional Baseball League and Taiwan Major League, also scouting for the Dodgers.
- February 14 – Bob Conley, 88, minor league pitcher who started two games for the 1958 Phillies.
- February 22 – Julio Cruz, 67, second baseman for the Mariners and White Sox from 1977 to 1986 who played a major role in helping Chicago to a division title in 1983.
- February 25 – Al Autry, 69, minor league pitcher who started one game for the 1976 Braves.
- February 27 – Fred Lasher, 80, relief pitcher for four American League teams from 1963 to 1971 including the 1968 World Series champion Tigers.
- February 28 – Ike Delock, 92, pitcher who won 84 games between 1952 and 1963, almost entirely with the Red Sox, winning more than ten games three times.

=== March ===
- March 10 – Odalis Pérez, 44, All-Star Dominican pitcher for four major league teams from 1998 to 2008 who won 15 games for the 2002 Dodgers.
- March 16 – Ralph Terry, 86, All-Star pitcher who won 107 games with four teams from 1956 to 1967 and was MVP of the 1962 World Series with the Yankees after leading the American League with 23 wins.
- March 16 – Pete Ward, 86, Canadian utility player for three American League teams from 1962 to 1970 who was runner-up for Rookie of the Year as a third baseman with the 1963 White Sox after batting .295.

=== April ===
- April 3 – Tommy Davis, 83, All-Star left fielder who batted .294 with ten teams over 18 season, winning batting titles with the Dodgers in 1962 and 1963, setting the franchise record with 153 RBI in 1962 and helping lead the team to the 1963 World Series title; later joined the Orioles for a pair of division titles.
- April 3 - Willie Tasby, 89, center fielder for four American League teams who batted .281 for 1960 Red Sox, led expansion 1961 Senators in RBI.
- April 5 – John Cumberland, 74, pitcher with four teams from 1968 to 1974 who won nine games for the Giants' 1971 division champions, later a pitching coach for the Red Sox and Royals.
- April 6 – John Ellis, 73, first baseman and catcher for three American League teams from 1969 to 1981 who hit an inside-the-park home run in his major league debut with the Yankees, later creating the Connecticut Cancer Foundation.
- April 8 – Carl Boles, 87, outfielder who batted .375 in 19 games for the Giants' 1962 pennant winners, later playing six seasons in Japan.
- April 9 – Jim Bronstad, 85, minor league pitcher who appeared in 45 games with the 1959 Yankees and 1963-1964 Senators.
- April 10 – Joe Horlen, 84, All-Star pitcher who won 116 games, almost all with the White Sox, and was runner-up for the 1967 Cy Young Award after leading the American League with a 2.06 ERA and throwing a no-hitter; ended his career with the 1972 World Series champion A's.
- April 26 – Luke Allen, 43, minor league outfielder and third baseman who appeared in eight games for the 2002 Dodgers and 2003 Rockies; batted .329 for the Las Vegas 51s in 2002.

=== May ===
- May 7 – Mike Adamson, 74, minor league pitcher who appeared in 11 games with the Orioles between 1967 and 1969.
- May 13 - Maurice Fisher, 91, pitcher who made one appearance for the 1955 Redlegs; pitched no-hitter for 1949 Muncie Reds, won 16 games with 1953 Columbia Reds.
- May 14 – David West, 57, pitcher for four major league teams between 1988 and 1998 including the 1991 World Series champion Twins and the 1993 pennant-winning Phillies.
- May 21 – Gordie Windhorn, 88, outfielder for four major league teams between 1959 and 1962, later playing six seasons in Japan.
- May 22 – Don Collins, 69, pitcher for two teams, primarily the 1977 Braves.
- May 23 – Joe Pignatano, 92, catcher for four teams from 1957 to 1962 including the 1959 World Series champion Dodgers, later a coach for 20 years with three clubs including the 1969 World Series champion Mets.
- May 24 – Bob Miller, 86, pitcher for three major league teams between 1953 and 1962, making his debut with the Tigers at age 17; won 14 games for the Southern Association's 1959 pennant-winning Birmingham Barons, and later chairman of the Major League Baseball alumni association.
- May 30 – Costen Shockley, 80, first baseman with the 1964 Phillies and 1965 Angels; coached his son's team to the 1981 Senior League World Series title.

=== June ===
- June 1 – Mark Schaeffer, 73, minor league pitcher who made 41 relief appearances for the 1972 Padres; led Carolina League with 226 strikeouts in 1967.
- June 7 – Frank Cipriani, 81, minor league outfielder who played 13 games for the 1961 Kansas City Athletics; won Florida State League batting title in 1960.
- June 18 – Dave Wickersham, 86, pitcher for four major league teams throughout the 1960s who won 19 games for the 1964 Tigers.
- June 20 – Joe Staton, 74, minor league first baseman who appeared in 15 games for the Tigers in 1972 and 1973; won Florida State League batting title in 1970.
- June 23 – Leo Posada, 88, Cuban outfielder who played for the Kansas City Athletics from 1960 to 1962 after hitting .314 with 122 RBI for the 1960 Shreveport Sports, later a minor league manager and scout.

=== July ===
- July 6 – Ed Bauta, 87, Cuban relief pitcher for the Cardinals and Mets from 1960 to 1964 who pitched in the Mets' last game at the Polo Grounds and their first in Shea Stadium.
- July 7 – George Elder, 101, outfielder who appeared in 41 games for the 1949 St. Louis Browns, and was the oldest living major league player.
- July 11 – Ducky Schofield, 87, shortstop for seven major league teams from 1953 to 1971, including the 1960 World Series champion Pirates, as well as National League champions with the 1966 Dodgers and 1968 Cardinals.
- July 20 – Bill Burbach, 74, pitcher for the Yankees from 1969 to 1971 who pitched a 5-hit shutout in his second major league game.
- July 22 – Dwight Smith, 58, outfielder for four major league teams from 1989 to 1996 including the 1995 World Series champion Braves, who was runner-up for National League Rookie of the Year with the 1989 division champion Cubs after batting .324.
- July 24 – Win Remmerswaal, 68, Dutch relief pitcher for the Red Sox in 1979 and 1980 who was the first European-trained major league player.
- July 24 – Julio Valdez, 66, Dominican shortstop for the Red Sox from 1980 to 1983, later a minor league coach and Dominican Summer League manager.

=== August ===
- August 2 – Vin Scully, 94, radio and TV voice of the Brooklyn & Los Angeles Dodgers for 67 years from 1950 to 2016, also calling World Series, playoff and All-Star Games for national networks in the 1980s and 1990s; the voice of the NFL on CBS and many other events including golf, tennis and college sports.
- August 14 – George Kernek, 82, minor league first baseman who played 30 games for the Cardinals in 1965 and 1966; was All-Star in International League in 1965.
- August 15 – Bob Locker, 84, relief pitcher for four teams from 1965 to 1975 including the 1972 World Series champion A's who posted a 2.75 ERA in 576 career games, earning 20 saves with the 1967 White Sox and 18 saves with the 1973 Cubs.
- August 18 – Milt Ramírez, 72, Puerto Rican infielder who appeared in 66 games for the 1970-1971 Cardinals, then spent seven years in the minors before returning with the 1979 A's.
- August 19 – John Wockenfuss, 73, catcher, first baseman and outfielder with the Tigers and Phillies who drove in 65 runs for Detroit in 1980 and batted .301 in 1982, later a minor league manager.
- August 25 – Ken Frailing, 74, pitcher for the White Sox and Cubs from 1972 to 1976, was an American Association All-Star in 1973 before winning six games for the 1974 Cubs.
- August 26 – Pete Burnside, 92, pitcher for four teams from 1955 to 1963, followed by two seasons in Japan; later coached his high school for 26 years.
- August 31 – Lee Thomas, 86, All-Star outfielder and first baseman for six major league teams from 1961 to 1968 who had 104 RBI with the 1962 Angels; later a Cardinals coach and Phillies general manager, assembling that club's 1993 pennant winners.

=== September ===
- September 1 – John Gamble, 74, minor league infielder who appeared in 13 games with the Tigers in 1972–1973, usually as a pinch runner.
- September 5 – Mark Littell, 69, relief pitcher for the Royals and Cardinals from 1973 to 1982 who led Kansas City's 1976 division champions in saves, later a minor league coach.
- September 8 – Ted Schreiber, 84, minor league infielder who appeared in 39 games for the 1963 Mets, and was the final player to bat at the Polo Grounds.
- September 9 – Ray Rippelmeyer, 89, pitcher who appeared in 18 games for the 1962 Senators, later pitching coach for the Phillies for nine years including division champions from 1976 through 1978.
- September 11 – Anthony Varvaro, 37, relief pitcher for the Braves and two other teams from 2010 to 2015, posting a 2.82 ERA with Atlanta's 2013 division champions.
- September 14 – Cal Browning, 84, minor league pitcher who appeared in one game with the 1960 Cardinals; led the International League in strikeouts in 1958.
- September 15 – John Stearns, 71, 4-time All-Star catcher for the Mets, later a coach for three teams including the Mets' 2000 pennant winners; also a minor league manager, scout and broadcaster.
- September 19 – Maury Wills, 89, 5-time All-Star shortstop for three National League teams who was named the league MVP with the Dodgers in 1962 after stealing a record 104 bases; led NL in steals six consecutive years, retiring with most steals of any player since 1930, and played for three World Series champions with Dodgers, winning two Gold Gloves; later managed the Mariners.
- September 28 – Tom Urbani, 54, pitcher for the Cardinals and Tigers from 1993 to 1996; later pitched in the Italian Baseball League, leading the league in wins and hurling a perfect game.
- September 29 – Héctor López, 93, Panamanian outfielder and third baseman for the Kansas City Athletics and Yankees from 1955 to 1966, including New York's World Series titles in 1961 and 1962 and three other pennant-winning teams; later became the first black manager at the AAA level.
- September 30 – Marv Staehle, 80, second baseman for three teams between 1964 and 1971, primarily the 1970 Expos; won batting title in final season of South Atlantic League with Nashville in 1963.

=== October ===
- October 3 – Al Neiger, 83, minor league pitcher who appeared in six games for the 1960 Phillies; 1959 All-American for the University of Delaware.
- October 5 – Tommy Boggs, 66, pitcher for the Braves and Rangers from 1976 to 1985 who won 12 games for Atlanta in 1980; coach for Concordia University Texas since 2009.
- October 10 – Dick Ellsworth, 82, All-Star pitcher who won 115 games with five teams from 1958 to 1971, 84 of them with the Cubs including 22 for the 1963 team; later became part owner of the Fresno Grizzlies.
- October 13 – Jim Bailey, 87, minor league pitcher who appeared in three games for the 1959 Reds, each time with his brother Ed catching.
- October 13 – Moe Savransky, 93, minor league pitcher who appeared in 16 games for the 1954 Redlegs, later a batting practice pitcher for the Indians.
- October 13 – Bruce Sutter, 69, Hall of Fame closer who played for three National League clubs from 1976 to 1988, leading league in saves five times and winning 1979 Cy Young Award with the Cubs after tying NL record with 37 saves; 6-time All-Star later tied major league record with 45 saves for 1984 Cardinals, was third pitcher to record 300 saves, and held NL record for career saves from 1982 to 1993; recorded save in League Championship Series and struck out final batter in World Series to clinch 1982 title for St. Louis.
- October 14 – Ed Olivares, 84, minor league outfielder who played 24 games with the Cardinals in 1960 and 1961; MVP of the Carolina League in 1960 after leading league in home runs and RBI.

=== November ===
- November 5 – Buddy Harris, 73, minor league pitcher who made 22 relief appearances for the Astros in 1970 and 1971; All-Star in the Carolina League in 1969 and the Southern League in 1970.
- November 6 – Mike Beard
- November 10 – Jack Reed, 89, outfielder for the Yankees from 1961 to 1963 including 1961 and 1962 World Series champions, batting .302 the latter season; his only career home run won record-setting 22-inning game in June 1962.
- November 12 – Chuck Carr, 55, center fielder for five teams from 1990 to 1997 who led National League in steals with Marlins in their inaugural 1993 season, ended career with Astros' 1997 division champions; later a minor league coach.
- November 20 – Dave Hillman, 95, pitcher for four major league teams from 1955 to 1962 who had strongest season with 1959 Cubs, winning eight games including a two-hitter and an 11-strikeout game in May.
- November 23 – Rudy Hernández, 90, Dominican pitcher who made 28 relief appearances for both Senators franchises in 1960 and 1961, becoming first Dominican to pitch in major leagues; later a scout for Cubs and Orioles.

=== December ===
- December 1 – Gaylord Perry, 84, Hall of Fame pitcher for eight teams from 1962 to 1983 who earned 314 wins with 3,534 strikeouts, defying opponents with suspected spitballs, real or perceived; first pitcher to win Cy Young Award in both leagues, with 24 wins for 1972 Indians and 21 with 1978 Padres among five 20-win campaigns; 5-time All-Star struck out 200 batters eight times, was last pitcher to hurl 300 complete games; pitched no-hitter and one-hitter in 1968 as well as 13 career two-hitters.
- December 8 – Tom Flanigan, 88, minor league pitcher who made two relief appearances for 1954 White Sox, one for 1958 Cardinals; pitched shutout on season's last day to clinch 1955 Southern Association pennant for Memphis Chicks.
- December 13 – Curt Simmons, 93, All-Star pitcher who won 193 games for four teams, led National League in shutouts in 1952; had 17 wins for Phillies' 1950 pennant winners and 18 for Cardinals' 1964 World Series champions; last living member of 1950 "Whiz Kids" team.
- December 17 – Wilbur Howard, 73, outfielder from 1973 to 1978, primarily with the Astros, who batted .283 with 32 steals in 1975.
- December 19 – Tom Browning, 62, All-Star pitcher who won 123 games, all with Reds, was runner-up for 1985 Rookie of the Year after 20-win season; hurled perfect game in 1988, had 15 wins for 1990 World Series champions, also winning Game 3 of Series sweep.
- December 20 – Denny Doyle, 79, second baseman for three teams from 1970 to 1977, batting .310 for Red Sox' 1975 pennant winners and reaching base in all 10 postseason games; later founded the instructional Doyle Baseball Academy.
- December 20 – Ray Herbert, 93, pitcher who won 104 games with four teams, including 20 for 1962 White Sox; earned win in second All-Star Game in 1962, led AL in shutouts in 1963.
- December 26 – Fred Valentine, 87, outfielder for the Senators and Orioles who led Washington in runs, steals and slugging in 1966; MVP of the Carolina League in 1958.
- December 29 – Stefan Wever, 64, German-born pitcher who won the pitching triple crown in the Southern League in 1982, then tore his rotator cuff in his only major league appearance with the Yankees that September.
