= 2026 World Baseball Classic rosters =

2026 World Baseball Classic

The 2026 World Baseball Classic (WBC) was an international professional baseball competition, composed of 20 competing nations, held from March 5 to March 17, 2026. It was the sixth iteration of the World Baseball Classic. The first-round hosts cities were San Juan, Tokyo, Houston, and Miami. The second-round hosts were Houston and Miami, and the final game was played in Miami. Twenty teams competed in the 2026 World Baseball Classic (WBC).

Each team was required to field a roster of 30 players, at least 14 of whom must be pitchers, and each team must carry two catchers.

Key

Pos.	Position
P	Pitcher
C	Catcher
IF	Infielder
OF	Outfielder

== Pool A ==
=== Puerto Rico ===
Manager: Yadier Molina

Coaches: Sandy Alomar Jr., Alex Cintrón, Joey Cora, Juan González, Edgar Martínez, Juan Nieves, Edgar Pérez and José Rosado

Player	No.	Pos.	Date of birth (age)	Team	League	Birthplace
Nolan Arenado	28	IF	April 16, 1991 (aged 34)	(United States) Arizona Diamondbacks	Major League Baseball	(United States) Newport Beach, California
Edwin Arroyo	13	IF	August 25, 2003 (aged 22)	(United States) Cincinnati Reds (minors)	Minor League Baseball	(Puerto Rico) Arecibo
Raymond Burgos	29	LHP	November 29, 1998 (aged 27)	(Mexico) Guerreros de Oaxaca	Mexican League	(Puerto Rico) Rio Grande
Willi Castro	3	UTL	April 24, 1997 (aged 28)	(United States) Colorado Rockies	Major League Baseball	(Puerto Rico) Río Piedras
Carlos Cortes	14	OF	June 30, 1997 (aged 28)	(United States) Athletics	Major League Baseball	(United States) Orlando, Florida
Fernando Cruz	63	RHP	March 28, 1990 (aged 35)	(United States) New York Yankees	Major League Baseball	(Puerto Rico) Bayamón
Edwin Díaz	39	RHP	March 22, 1994 (aged 31)	(United States) Los Angeles Dodgers	Major League Baseball	(Puerto Rico) Naguabo
José Espada	35	RHP	February 22, 1997 (aged 29)	(United States) Baltimore Orioles	Major League Baseball	(Puerto Rico) Ponce
José De León	87	RHP	August 7, 1992 (aged 33)	(Mexico) Caliente de Durango	Mexican League	(Puerto Rico) Isabela
Rico Garcia	52	RHP	January 10, 1994 (aged 32)	(United States) Baltimore Orioles	Major League Baseball	(United States) Honolulu, Hawaii
Darell Hernáiz	23	IF	August 3, 2001 (aged 24)	(United States) Athletics	Major League Baseball	(Puerto Rico) San Juan
Jorge López	48	RHP	February 10, 1993 (aged 33)	Free agent		(Puerto Rico) Cayey
Matthew Lugo	6	OF	May 9, 2001 (aged 24)	(United States) Los Angeles Angels	Major League Baseball	(Puerto Rico) Manatí
Seth Lugo	67	RHP	November 17, 1989 (aged 36)	(United States) Kansas City Royals	Major League Baseball	(United States) Shreveport, Louisiana
Martín Maldonado (C)	15	C	August 16, 1986 (aged 39)	Free agent		(Puerto Rico) Naguabo
MJ Melendez	10	UTL	November 29, 1998 (aged 27)	(United States) New York Mets (minors)	Major League Baseball	(United States) Daytona Beach, Florida
Jovani Morán	16	LHP	April 24, 1997 (aged 28)	(United States) Boston Red Sox	Major League Baseball	(Puerto Rico) Mayagüez
Luis Quiñones	51	RHP	July 2, 1997 (aged 28)	(United States) Minnesota Twins (minors)	Minor League Baseball	(Puerto Rico) Arecibo
Heliot Ramos	22	OF	September 7, 1999 (aged 26)	(United States) San Francisco Giants	Major League Baseball	(Puerto Rico) Maunabo
Ángel Reyes	34	RHP	October 17, 1997 (aged 28)	Free agent		(Puerto Rico) Maunabo
Yacksel Ríos	75	RHP	June 27, 1993 (aged 32)	(United States) Chicago Cubs (minors)	Minor League Baseball	(Puerto Rico) Caguas
Eduardo Rivera	99	LHP	June 13, 2003 (aged 22)	(United States) Boston Red Sox (minors)	Minor League Baseball	(Puerto Rico) San Juan
Emmanuel Rivera	26	IF	June 29, 1996 (aged 29)	Free agent		(Puerto Rico) Mayagüez
Elmer Rodríguez	18	RHP	August 18, 2003 (aged 22)	(United States) New York Yankees (minors)	Minor League Baseball	(Puerto Rico) Trujillo Alto
Gabriel Rodríguez	69	LHP	April 9, 1999 (aged 26)	Free agent		(Puerto Rico) Bayamón
Eddie Rosario	17	OF	September 28, 1991 (aged 34)	Free agent		(Puerto Rico) Guayama
Bryan Torres	2	UTL	July 2, 1997 (aged 28)	(United States) St. Louis Cardinals (minors)	Minor League Baseball	(Puerto Rico) Caguas
Christian Vázquez	7	C	August 21, 1990 (aged 35)	(United States) Houston Astros (minors)	Minor League Baseball	(Puerto Rico) Bayamón
Luis Vázquez	8	IF	October 10, 1999 (aged 26)	(United States) Baltimore Orioles (minors)	Minor League Baseball	(Puerto Rico) Orocovis
Ricardo Velez	44	RHP	August 21, 1998 (aged 27)	(United States) Texas Rangers (minors)	Minor League Baseball	(Puerto Rico) Lajas

Designated Pitcher Pool: Jonathan Bermúdez, José Berríos and Alexis Díaz

=== Cuba ===
Manager: 11 Germán Mesa

Coaches: 19 Jesús Bosmenier (pitching), 51 Cecilio Drake (first base), 39 Noelvis González (bench), 37 Humberto Guevara, 99 Pedro Luis Lazo (pitching), 50 Omar Linares (hitting), 49 Rafael Muñoz (third base)

Player	No.	Pos.	Date of birth (age)	Team	League	Birthplace
Frank Álvarez	22	RHP	January 16, 1999 (aged 27)	(Cuba) Vegueros de Pinar del Río	Cuban National Series	(Cuba) Pinar del Río
Erisbel Arruebarrena	71	IF	March 25, 1990 (aged 35)	(Cuba) Cocodrilos de Matanzas	Cuban National Series	(Cuba) Cienfuegos
Yiddi Cappe	24	IF	September 17, 2002 (aged 23)	(United States) Miami Marlins (minors)	Minor League Baseball	(Cuba) Havana
Emmanuel Chapman	34	RHP	September 23, 1998 (aged 27)	(United States) Pittsburgh Pirates (minors)	Minor League Baseball	(Cuba) Baguanos
Josimar Cousín	30	RHP	February 18, 1998 (aged 28)	Free agent		(Cuba) Camagüey
Alfredo Despaigne (C)	54	OF	June 17, 1986 (aged 39)	(Cuba) Alazanes de Granma	Cuban National Series	Santiago de Cuba
Armando Dueñas	6	RHP	September 17, 1994 (aged 31)	(Cuba) Cocodrilos de Matanzas	Cuban National Series	(Cuba) Matanzas
Yoelquis Guibert	7	OF	August 31, 1994 (aged 31)	Avispas de Santiago de Cuba	Cuban National Series	(Cuba) Palma Soriano
Omar Hernández	3	C	December 10, 2001 (aged 24)	(United States) Kansas City Royals (minors)	Minor League Baseball	(Cuba) Havana
Denny Larrondo	25	RHP	May 31, 2002 (aged 23)	Free agent		(Cuba) Villa Clara
Yoan López	35	RHP	January 2, 1993 (aged 33)	(Mexico) Algodoneros de Unión Laguna	Mexican League	(Cuba) Nueva Gerona
Ariel Martínez	40	OF	May 28, 1996 (aged 29)	(Japan) Hokkaido Nippon-Ham Fighters	Nippon Professional Baseball	(Cuba) Matanzas
Raidel Martínez	92	RHP	October 11, 1996 (aged 29)	(Japan) Yomiuri Giants	Nippon Professional Baseball	(Cuba) Pinar del Río
Randy Martínez	90	LHP	September 28, 2003 (aged 22)	(Japan) Chunichi Dragons (farm)	NPB Farm League	(Cuba) Pinar del Río
Leonel Moas	20	OF	April 14, 1996 (aged 29)	(Cuba) Toros de Camagüey	Cuban National Series	(Cuba) Camagüey
Liván Moinelo	89	LHP	December 8, 1995 (aged 30)	(Japan) Fukuoka SoftBank Hawks	Nippon Professional Baseball	(Cuba) Pinar del Río
Yoán Moncada	10	IF	May 27, 1995 (aged 30)	(United States) Los Angeles Angels	Major League Baseball	(Cuba) Abreus
Darien Núñez	62	LHP	March 19, 1993 (aged 32)	(Mexico) Algodoneros de Unión Laguna	Mexican League	(Cuba) Las Tunas
Malcom Núñez	9	IF	March 9, 2001 (aged 24)	Free agent		(Cuba) Havana
Andrys Pérez	17	C	February 9, 2001 (aged 25)	(Cuba) Cocodrilos de Matanzas	Cuban National Series	(Cuba) Matanzas
Alexei Ramírez	2	IF	September 22, 1981 (aged 44)	(Cuba) Vegueros de Pinar del Río	Cuban National Series	(Cuba) Pinar del Río
Julio Robaina	38	LHP	March 23, 2001 (aged 24)	(Mexico) Tigres de Quintana Roo	Mexican League	(Cuba) San Antonio de los Baños
Cristián Rodríguez	95	IF	March 31, 2002 (aged 23)	(Japan) Chunichi Dragons (farm)	NPB Farm League	(Cuba) Pinar del Río
Osiel Rodríguez	15	RHP	November 22, 2001 (aged 24)	Free agent		(Cuba) Ciego de Avila
Yariel Rodríguez	29	RHP	October 3, 1997 (aged 28)	(Canada) Toronto Blue Jays (minors)	Minor League Baseball	(Cuba) Camagüey
Miguel Romero	16	RHP	April 23, 1994 (aged 31)	(Mexico) El Águila de Veracruz	Mexican League	(Cuba) Guantánamo
Pedro Santos	18	RHP	January 7, 2000 (aged 26)	Free agent		(Cuba) Antilla
Roel Santos	1	OF	May 22, 1987 (aged 38)	(Mexico) Olmecas de Tabasco	Mexican League	(Cuba) Granma
Alexander Vargas	13	IF	September 29, 2001 (aged 24)	(United States) Cincinnati Reds (minors)	Minor League Baseball	(Cuba) Matanzas
Yoel Yanqui	33	OF	April 25, 1996 (aged 29)	(Mexico) Guerreros de Oaxaca	Mexican League	(Cuba) Palma Soriano

Designated Pitcher Pool: Yunieski García, Yusniel Padron-Artiles, Dario Sarduy, Francis Texido and Yoennis Yera

=== Canada ===
Brock Dykxhoorn replaced Carter Loewen, who was unable to play in the tournament because he was unable to obtain insurance.

Manager: (United States) Ernie Whitt

Coaches: Stubby Clapp, Denis Boucher, Greg Hamilton, Russell Martin, Justin Morneau and Paul Quantrill

Player	No.	Pos.	Date of birth (age)	Team	League	Birthplace
Logan S. Allen	22	LHP	May 23, 1997 (aged 28)	(Mexico) Toros de Tijuana	Mexican League	(United States) West Palm Beach, Florida
Micah Ashman	57	LHP	August 22, 2002 (aged 23)	(United States) Baltimore Orioles (minors)	Minor League Baseball	(United States) Salt Lake City, Utah
Phillippe Aumont	37	RHP	January 7, 1989 (aged 37)	Free agent		(Canada) Gatineau, Quebec
Jordan Balazovic	16	RHP	September 17, 1998 (aged 27)	(Taiwan) Uni-President 7-Eleven Lions	Chinese Professional Baseball League	(Canada) Kingston, Ontario
Tyler Black	7	IF	July 26, 2000 (aged 25)	(United States) Milwaukee Brewers	Major League Baseball	(Canada) Toronto, Ontario
Owen Caissie	21	OF	July 8, 2002 (aged 23)	(United States) Miami Marlins	Major League Baseball	(Canada) Burlington, Ontario
Eric Cerantola	87	LHP	May 2, 2000 (aged 25)	(United States) Kansas City Royals (minors)	Minor League Baseball	(Canada) Montreal, Quebec
Denzel Clarke	1	OF	May 1, 2000 (aged 25)	(United States) Athletics	Major League Baseball	(Canada) Toronto, Ontario
Matt Davidson	24	IF	March 26, 1991 (aged 34)	(South Korea) NC Dinos	KBO League	(United States) Yucaipa, California
Indigo Diaz	52	RHP	October 14, 1998 (aged 27)	(United States) Arizona Diamondbacks (minors)	Minor League Baseball	(Canada) North Vancouver, British Columbia
Brock Dykxhoorn	44	RHP	July 2, 1994 (aged 31)	(Taiwan) Uni-President 7-Eleven Lions	Chinese Professional Baseball League	(Canada) Goderich, Ontario
Adam Hall	2	IF	May 2, 1999 (aged 26)	Free agent		Hamilton, Bermuda
Liam Hicks	34	C	June 2, 1999 (aged 26)	(United States) Miami Marlins	Major League Baseball	(Canada) Toronto, Ontario
Antoine Jean	14	LHP	August 1, 2001 (aged 24)	(United States) Colorado Rockies (minors)	Minor League Baseball	(Canada) Montreal, Quebec
Edouard Julien	15	IF	April 30, 1999 (aged 26)	(United States) Colorado Rockies	Major League Baseball	(Canada) Quebec City, Quebec
Otto López	6	IF	October 1, 1998 (aged 27)	(United States) Miami Marlins	Major League Baseball	Santo Domingo, Dominican Republic
Adam Macko	64	LHP	December 30, 2000 (aged 25)	(Canada) Toronto Blue Jays (minors)	Minor League Baseball	Bratislava, Slovakia
Bo Naylor	23	C	February 21, 2000 (aged 26)	(United States) Cleveland Guardians	Major League Baseball	(Canada) Mississauga, Ontario
Josh Naylor (C)	12	IF	June 22, 1997 (aged 28)	(United States) Seattle Mariners	Major League Baseball	(Canada) Mississauga, Ontario
Tyler O'Neill	9	OF	June 22, 1995 (aged 30)	(United States) Baltimore Orioles	Major League Baseball	(Canada) Burnaby, British Columbia
James Paxton	65	LHP	November 6, 1988 (aged 37)	Free agent		(Canada) Richmond, British Columbia
Cal Quantrill	47	RHP	February 10, 1995 (aged 31)	(United States) Texas Rangers (minors)	Minor League Baseball	(Canada) Port Hope, Ontario
Jacob Robson	8	OF	November 20, 1994 (aged 31)	(United States) Long Island Ducks	Atlantic League of Professional Baseball	(Canada) London, Ontario
Noah Skirrow	25	RHP	July 21, 1998 (aged 27)	(United States) Lancaster Stormers	Atlantic League of Professional Baseball	(Canada) Cambridge, Ontario
Michael Soroka	40	RHP	August 4, 1997 (aged 28)	(United States) Arizona Diamondbacks	Major League Baseball	(Canada) Calgary, Alberta
Jameson Taillon	50	RHP	November 18, 1991 (aged 34)	(United States) Chicago Cubs	Major League Baseball	(United States) Lakeland, Florida
Abraham Toro	31	IF	December 20, 1996 (aged 29)	(United States) Kansas City Royals (minors)	Major League Baseball	(Canada) Longueuil, Quebec
Matt Wilkinson	35	LHP	December 10, 2002 (aged 23)	(United States) Cleveland Guardians (minors)	Minor League Baseball	(Canada) Vancouver, British Columbia
Jared Young	29	OF	July 9, 1995 (aged 30)	(United States) New York Mets	Major League Baseball	(Canada) Prince George, British Columbia
Rob Zastryzny	58	LHP	March 26, 1992 (aged 33)	(United States) Milwaukee Brewers	Major League Baseball	(Canada) Edmonton, Alberta

=== Panama ===
Iván Herrera was named to the roster, but was ruled out for the tournament due to ongoing recovery from right elbow surgery; he was replaced on the roster by Luis Castillo.

Manager: José Mayorga

Coaches: Luis Caballero, Einar Díaz, Lino Díaz, Raul Domínguez, Carlos Lee, Gilberto Méndez, Julio Mosquera, Julio Rangel and Cristian Pérez

Player	No.	Pos.	Date of birth (age)	Team	League	Birthplace
Darío Agrazal	82	RHP	December 28, 1994 (aged 31)	(Mexico) Leones de Yucatán	Mexican League	(Panama) Aguadulce
Logan T. Allen	26	LHP	September 5, 1998 (aged 27)	(United States) Cleveland Guardians	Major League Baseball	(United States) Altamonte Springs, Florida
Jonathan Araúz	28	IF	August 3, 1998 (aged 27)	Free agent		(Panama) Alanje
Miguel Amaya	9	C	March 9, 1999 (aged 26)	(United States) Chicago Cubs	Major League Baseball	(Panama) Chitré
Alberto Baldonado	25	LHP	February 1, 1993 (aged 33)	(Japan) Yomiuri Giants	Nippon Professional Baseball	(Panama) Colón
Jaime Barría	51	RHP	July 18, 1996 (aged 29)	(Mexico) Algodoneros de Unión Laguna	Mexican League	Panama City
Leonardo Bernal	18	C	February 13, 2004 (aged 22)	(United States) St. Louis Cardinals (minors)	Minor League Baseball	Panama City
Christian Bethancourt	22	C	September 2, 1991 (aged 34)	(United States) Chicago Cubs (minors)	Minor League Baseball	Panama City
Enrique Bradfield	2	OF	December 2, 2001 (aged 24)	(United States) Baltimore Orioles (minors)	Minor League Baseball	(United States) Pembroke Pines, Florida
José Caballero	77	IF	February 10, 1996 (aged 30)	(United States) New York Yankees	Major League Baseball	(Panama) Las Tablas
Johan Camargo	7	IF	December 13, 1993 (aged 32)	(Mexico) Conspiradores de Querétaro	Mexican League	Panama City
Luis Castillo	23	OF	May 15, 1989 (aged 36)	(Panama) Federales de Chiriquí	PROBEIS	(Panama) Aguadulce
Miguel Cienfuegos	0	LHP	February 10, 1997 (aged 29)	(United States) San Diego Padres (minors)	Minor League Baseball	(Canada) Laval, Quebec
Allen Córdoba	13	OF	December 6, 1995 (aged 30)	(Mexico) Diablos Rojos del México	Mexican League	(Panama) Changuinola
Paolo Espino	21	RHP	January 10, 1987 (aged 39)	Free agent		Panama City
Jorge García	3	RHP	May 10, 2002 (aged 23)	(Mexico) Caliente de Durango	Mexican League	(Panama) San Miguelito
Miguel Gómez	15	RHP	September 10, 2001 (aged 24)	(Mexico) Bravos de León	Mexican League	Panama City
James González	4	RHP	September 5, 2000 (aged 25)	(United States) Athletics (minors)	Minor League Baseball	(Panama) David
Severino González	52	RHP	September 28, 1992 (aged 33)	(United Arab Emirates) Mid East Falcons	Baseball United	(Panama) Santiago de Veraguas
Javy Guerra	12	RHP	September 25, 1995 (aged 30)	(United States) Atlanta Braves (minors)	Minor League Baseball	(Panama) David
Kenny Hernández	24	LHP	June 24, 1998 (aged 27)	Free agent		(Panama) David
Leo Jiménez	49	IF	May 17, 2001 (aged 24)	(Canada) Toronto Blue Jays	Major League Baseball	(Panama) Chitré
Ariel Jurado	37	RHP	January 30, 1996 (aged 30)	(South Korea) Samsung Lions	KBO League	(Panama) Aguadulce
Humberto Mejía	91	RHP	March 3, 1997 (aged 29)	(Japan) Chunichi Dragons	Nippon Professional Baseball	Panama City
Abdiel Mendoza	19	RHP	October 19, 1998 (aged 27)	(United States) Seattle Mariners (minors)	Minor League Baseball	(Panama) Chitré
José Ramos	99	OF	January 1, 2001 (aged 25)	(United States) New York Mets (minors)	Minor League Baseball	(Panama) Chepo
Erian Rodríguez	5	RHP	November 23, 2001 (aged 24)	(United States) Chicago Cubs (minors)	Minor League Baseball	Panama City
Jhonny Santos	32	OF	October 2, 1996 (aged 29)	(Panama) Federales de Chiriquí	PROBEIS	(Panama) Puerto Armuelles
Edmundo Sosa	33	IF	March 6, 1996 (aged 29)	(United States) Philadelphia Phillies	Major League Baseball	Panama City
Rubén Tejada	11	IF	October 27, 1989 (aged 36)	(Mexico) Caliente de Durango	Mexican League	(Panama) Santiago de Veraguas

Designated Pitcher Pool: Enrique Burgos, Steven Fuentes, Alberto Guerrero, Kevin Miranda and Abdiel Saldaña

=== Colombia ===
Carlos Arroyo replaced Nabil Crismatt, who missed the tournament due to elbow surgery.

Manager: José Mosquera

Coaches: Jaime Del Valle, Dayan Díaz, Jair Fernández, Erick Julio, Ronald Ramírez and Jhonatan Solano

Player	No.	Pos.	Date of birth (age)	Team	League	Birthplace
Elkin Alcalá	26	RHP	August 2, 1997 (aged 28)	(Colombia) Caimanes de Barranquilla	Colombian League	(Colombia) Cartagena
Adrián Almeida	19	LHP	February 25, 1995 (aged 31)	(Mexico) Rieleros de Aguascalientes	Mexican League	Puerto Cabello, Venezuela
Carlos Arroyo	40	IF	July 11, 2001 (aged 24)	(Colombia) Caimanes de Barranquilla	Colombian League	(Colombia) Cartagena
Michael Arroyo	8	IF	October 22, 2004 (aged 21)	(United States) Seattle Mariners (minors)	Minor League Baseball	(Colombia) Cartagena
Austin Bergner	45	RHP	May 1, 1997 (aged 28)	(United States) Texas Rangers (minors)	Minor League Baseball	(United States) Windermere, Florida
Brayan Buelvas	12	OF	June 8, 2002 (aged 23)	(United States) Athletics (minors)	Minor League Baseball	(Colombia) Montería
Gustavo Campero	57	OF	September 20, 1997 (aged 28)	(United States) Los Angeles Angels (minors)	Minor League Baseball	(Colombia) Santa Cruz de Lorica
Danis Correa	41	RHP	August 26, 1999 (aged 26)	(United States) New York Mets (minors)	Minor League Baseball	(Colombia) Cartegena
Jordan Díaz	13	IF	August 13, 2000 (aged 25)	(Mexico) / (United States) Tecolotes de los Dos Laredos	Mexican League	(Colombia) Montería
Luis Escobar	78	RHP	May 30, 1996 (aged 29)	(Nicaragua) Gigantes de Rivas	Nicaraguan League	(Colombia) Cartagena
Dayan Frías	71	IF	June 25, 2002 (aged 23)	(United States) Cleveland Guardians (minors)	Minor League Baseball	(Colombia) Cartagena
Pedro García	72	RHP	March 21, 1995 (aged 30)	(Mexico) Bravos de León	Mexican League	Maracaibo, Venezuela
Rio Gomez	92	LHP	October 20, 1994 (aged 31)	Free agent		(United States) Miami, Florida
Yapson Gómez	30	LHP	October 2, 1993 (aged 32)	(Venezuela) Caciques de Distrito	Venezuelan Major League	San Cristóbal, Venezuela
David Lorduy	39	RHP	October 15, 2003 (aged 22)	(United States) Cincinnati Reds (minors)	Minor League Baseball	(Colombia) Sincelejo
Emerson Martínez	96	RHP	January 11, 1995 (aged 31)	(Mexico) Saraperos de Saltillo	Mexican League	Güigüe, Venezuela
Jesús Marriaga	16	OF	December 17, 1998 (aged 27)	(Colombia) Caimanes de Barranquilla	Colombian League	(Colombia) Cartagena
Carlos Martínez	70	C	May 2, 1995 (aged 30)	Free agent		(Colombia) Cartagena
Luis Patiño	77	RHP	October 26, 1999 (aged 26)	(Mexico) Diablos Rojos del México	Mexican League	(Colombia) Barranquilla
Tito Polo	23	OF	August 23, 1994 (aged 31)	(Colombia) Tigres de Cartagena	Colombian League	(Colombia) San Andrés
José Quintana (C)	62	LHP	January 24, 1989 (aged 37)	(United States) Colorado Rockies	Major League Baseball	(Colombia) Arjona
Harold Ramírez	43	OF	September 6, 1994 (aged 31)	(Mexico) / (United States) Tecolotes de los Dos Laredos	Mexican League	(Colombia) Cartagena
Reynaldo Rodríguez	17	IF	July 2, 1986 (aged 39)	(Mexico) Caliente de Durango	Mexican League	(Colombia) Cartagena
Jhon Romero	73	RHP	January 17, 1995 (aged 31)	Free agent		(Colombia) Cartagena
Donovan Solano	7	IF	December 17, 1987 (aged 38)	Free agent		(Colombia) Barranquilla
Julio Teherán	49	RHP	January 27, 1991 (aged 35)	(Colombia) Caimanes de Barranquilla	Colombian League	(Colombia) Cartagena
Gio Urshela	29	IF	October 11, 1991 (aged 34)	(United States) Minnesota Twins (minors)	Minor League Baseball	(Colombia) Cartagena
Daniel Vellojín	51	C	March 15, 2000 (aged 25)	(United States) Tampa Bay Rays (minors)	Minor League Baseball	(Colombia) Cartagena
Ezequiel Zabaleta	10	RHP	August 20, 1995 (aged 30)	(Colombia) Caimanes de Barranquilla	Colombian League	(Colombia) María La Baja
Guillo Zuñiga	66	RHP	October 10, 1998 (aged 27)	(United States) Seattle Mariners (minors)	Minor League Baseball	(Colombia) Cartagena

Designated Pitcher Pool: Sean Linan and Julio Vivas

== Pool B ==
=== United States ===
Corbin Carroll missed the tournament due to an injury and was replaced by Roman Anthony. Tarik Skubal withdrew after one outing. Clayton Kershaw was replaced by Jeff Hoffman prior to the semifinals.

Manager: Mark DeRosa

Coaches: Sean Casey, Dino Ebel, Fredi González, Matt Holliday, George Lombard, Brian McCann, Andy Pettitte, David Ross, and Michael Young

Player	No.	Pos.	Date of birth (age)	Team	League	Birthplace
Roman Anthony	3	OF	May 13, 2004 (aged 21)	(United States) Boston Red Sox	Major League Baseball	(United States) West Palm Beach, Florida
David Bednar	53	RHP	October 10, 1994 (aged 31)	(United States) New York Yankees	Major League Baseball	(United States) Pittsburgh, Pennsylvania
Matthew Boyd	31	LHP	February 2, 1991 (aged 35)	(United States) Chicago Cubs	Major League Baseball	(United States) Mercer Island, Washington
Alex Bregman	2	3B	March 30, 1994 (aged 31)	(United States) Chicago Cubs	Major League Baseball	(United States) Albuquerque, New Mexico
Byron Buxton	25	OF	December 18, 1993 (aged 32)	(United States) Minnesota Twins	Major League Baseball	(United States) Baxley, Georgia
Garrett Cleavinger	60	LHP	April 23, 1994 (aged 31)	(United States) Tampa Bay Rays	Major League Baseball	(United States) Lawrence, Kansas
Ernie Clement	5	UTL	March 22, 1996 (aged 29)	(Canada) Toronto Blue Jays	Major League Baseball	(United States) Rochester, New York
Pete Crow-Armstrong	4	OF	March 25, 2002 (aged 23)	(United States) Chicago Cubs	Major League Baseball	(United States) Sherman Oaks, California
Gunnar Henderson	11	SS/3B	June 29, 2001 (aged 24)	(United States) Baltimore Orioles	Major League Baseball	(United States) Montgomery, Alabama
Bryce Harper	24	1B	October 16, 1992 (aged 33)	(United States) Philadelphia Phillies	Major League Baseball	(United States) Las Vegas, Nevada
Jeff Hoffman	34	RHP	January 8, 1993 (aged 33)	(Canada) Toronto Blue Jays	Major League Baseball	(United States) Latham, New York
Clay Holmes	35	RHP	March 27, 1993 (aged 32)	(United States) New York Mets	Major League Baseball	(United States) Dothan, Alabama
Griffin Jax	48	RHP	November 22, 1994 (aged 31)	(United States) Tampa Bay Rays	Major League Baseball	(United States) Phoenix, Arizona
Aaron Judge (C)	99	OF	April 26, 1992 (aged 33)	(United States) New York Yankees	Major League Baseball	(United States) Sacramento, California
Brad Keller	40	RHP	July 27, 1995 (aged 30)	(United States) Philadelphia Phillies	Major League Baseball	(United States) Snellville, Georgia
Clayton Kershaw	22	LHP	March 19, 1988 (aged 37)	Free agent		(United States) Dallas, Texas
Nolan McLean	26	RHP	July 24, 2001 (aged 24)	(United States) New York Mets	Major League Baseball	(United States) Willow Spring, North Carolina
Mason Miller	19	RHP	August 24, 1998 (aged 27)	(United States) San Diego Padres	Major League Baseball	(United States) Pittsburgh, Pennsylvania
Cal Raleigh	29	C	November 26, 1996 (aged 29)	(United States) Seattle Mariners	Major League Baseball	(United States) Cullowhee, North Carolina
Kyle Schwarber	12	DH	March 5, 1993 (aged 33)	(United States) Philadelphia Phillies	Major League Baseball	(United States) Middletown, Ohio
Paul Skenes	30	RHP	May 29, 2002 (aged 23)	(United States) Pittsburgh Pirates	Major League Baseball	(United States) Fullerton, California
Tarik Skubal*	27	LHP	November 20, 1996 (aged 29)	(United States) Detroit Tigers	Major League Baseball	(United States) Hayward, California
Will Smith	16	C	March 28, 1995 (aged 30)	(United States) Los Angeles Dodgers	Major League Baseball	(United States) Louisville, Kentucky
Gabe Speier	55	LHP	April 12, 1995 (aged 30)	(United States) Seattle Mariners	Major League Baseball	(United States) Santa Barbara, California
Brice Turang	13	2B	November 21, 1999 (aged 26)	(United States) Milwaukee Brewers	Major League Baseball	(United States) Corona, California
Michael Wacha	52	RHP	July 1, 1991 (aged 34)	(United States) Kansas City Royals	Major League Baseball	(United States) Iowa City, Iowa
Logan Webb	62	RHP	November 18, 1996 (aged 29)	(United States) San Francisco Giants	Major League Baseball	(United States) Rocklin, California
Garrett Whitlock	59	RHP	June 11, 1996 (aged 29)	(United States) Boston Red Sox	Major League Baseball	(United States) Snellville, Georgia
Bobby Witt Jr.	7	SS	June 14, 2000 (aged 25)	(United States) Kansas City Royals	Major League Baseball	(United States) Colleyville, Texas
Ryan Yarbrough	44	LHP	December 31, 1991 (aged 34)	(United States) New York Yankees	Major League Baseball	(United States) Austin, Texas

Designated Pitcher Pool: Tim Hill, Jeff Hoffman, Tyler Rogers, Joe Ryan, Matt Strahm and Will Vest

- Withdrew

=== Mexico ===
Manny Barreda replaced Taj Bradley, who decided to stay in spring training with the Minnesota Twins. Roel Ramírez replaced Jose Urquidy, who was unable to obtain insurance.

Manager: Benji Gil

Coaches: Vinny Castilla, Jacob Cruz, Manny Del Campo, Elmer Dessens, Bobby Magallanes, Tony Perezchica, Horacio Ramírez and Gil Velázquez

Player	No.	Pos.	Date of birth (age)	Team	League	Birthplace
Nacho Alvarez Jr.	2	IF	April 11, 2003 (aged 22)	(United States) Atlanta Braves	Major League Baseball	(United States) Fontana, California
Jonathan Aranda	8	IF	May 23, 1998 (aged 27)	(United States) Tampa Bay Rays	Major League Baseball	(Mexico) Tijuana
Alexander Armenta	35	LHP	June 26, 2004 (aged 21)	(Japan) Fukuoka SoftBank Hawks (farm)	NPB Farm League	(Mexico) Los Mochis
Randy Arozarena	56	OF	February 28, 1995 (aged 31)	(United States) Seattle Mariners	Major League Baseball	Arroyos de Mantua, Pinar del Río, Cuba
Javier Assad	77	RHP	July 30, 1997 (aged 28)	(United States) Chicago Cubs	Major League Baseball	(Mexico) Tijuana
Manny Barreda	50	RHP	October 8, 1988 (aged 37)	(Mexico) Saraperos de Saltillo	Mexican League	(United States) Prescott, Arizona
Brennan Bernardino	22	LHP	January 15, 1992 (aged 34)	(United States) Colorado Rockies	Major League Baseball	(United States) Valencia, California
Alex Carrillo	24	RHP	June 6, 1997 (aged 28)	(United States) New York Mets	Major League Baseball	(United States) Paramount, California
Jesús Cruz	49	RHP	April 15, 1995 (aged 30)	(Mexico) Saraperos de Saltillo	Mexican League	(Mexico) Salinas de Hidalgo
Daniel Duarte	53	RHP	December 4, 1996 (aged 29)	(United States) New York Mets	Major League Baseball	(Mexico) Huatabampo
Jarren Duran	16	OF	September 5, 1996 (aged 29)	(United States) Boston Red Sox	Major League Baseball	(United States) Corona, California
Robert Garcia	62	LHP	June 14, 1996 (aged 29)	(United States) Texas Rangers	Major League Baseball	(United States) Manteca, California
Luis Gastélum	27	RHP	September 27, 2001 (aged 24)	(United States) St. Louis Cardinals (minors)	Minor League Baseball	(Mexico) Los Mochis
Mateo Gil	4	IF	July 24, 2000 (aged 25)	(Mexico) Charros de Jalisco	Mexican League	(United States) Newport Beach, California
Nick Gonzales	13	IF	May 27, 1999 (aged 26)	(United States) Pittsburgh Pirates	Major League Baseball	(United States) Tucson, Arizona
Alejandro Kirk	30	C	November 6, 1998 (aged 27)	(Canada) Toronto Blue Jays	Major League Baseball	(Mexico) Tijuana
Joey Meneses	32	IF	May 6, 1992 (aged 33)	(United States) Athletics (minors)	Minor League Baseball	(Mexico) Culiacán
Andrés Muñoz	75	RHP	January 16, 1999 (aged 27)	(United States) Seattle Mariners	Major League Baseball	(Mexico) Los Mochis
Samy Natera Jr.	17	LHP	November 5, 1999 (aged 26)	(United States) Los Angeles Angels (minors)	Minor League Baseball	(Mexico) Ciudad Juárez
Joey Ortiz	7	IF	July 14, 1998 (aged 27)	(United States) Milwaukee Brewers	Major League Baseball	(United States) Garden Grove, California
Julián Ornelas	31	OF	December 28, 1996 (aged 29)	(Mexico) Diablos Rojos del México	Mexican League	(Mexico) Tijuana
Alejandro Osuna	19	OF	October 10, 2002 (aged 23)	(United States) Texas Rangers	Major League Baseball	(Mexico) Los Mochis
Roel Ramírez	55	RHP	May 1, 1995 (aged 30)	(Mexico) Toros de Tijuana	Mexican League	(United States) Laredo, Texas
Gerardo Reyes	33	RHP	May 13, 1993 (aged 32)	(Mexico) Diablos Rojos del México	Mexican League	(Mexico) Ciudad Victoria
Jared Serna	59	IF	June 1, 2002 (aged 23)	(United States) Miami Marlins (minors)	Minor League Baseball	(Mexico) Guaymas
Rowdy Tellez	44	IF	March 16, 1995 (aged 30)	Free agent		(United States) Sacramento, California
Alek Thomas	5	OF	April 28, 2000 (aged 25)	(United States) Arizona Diamondbacks	Major League Baseball	(United States) Tucson, Arizona
Victor Vodnik	11	RHP	October 9, 1999 (aged 26)	(United States) Colorado Rockies	Major League Baseball	(United States) Whittier, California
Taijuan Walker	99	RHP	August 13, 1992 (aged 33)	(United States) Philadelphia Phillies	Major League Baseball	(United States) Shreveport, Louisiana
Alexis Wilson	26	C	August 31, 1996 (aged 29)	(Mexico) Tigres de Quintana Roo	Mexican League	(Mexico) Los Mochis

Designated Pitcher Pool: Valente Bellozo, Omar Cruz, Nestor German, Victor Lizarraga, Irvin Machuca and Alan Rangel

=== Italy ===
J.J. D'Orazio replaced captain Alberto Mineo, who missed the tournament after suffering an injury during training camp. Kyle Teel was injured in the game against the United States on March 10; he was replaced by bullpen catcher Andres Annunziata for the remainder of the group stage, and later by Mickey Gasper for quarterfinals and beyond. Brayan Rocchio replaced Miles Mastrobuoni, who suffered a calf injury during pool play, for the semifinal round.

Manager: (Venezuela) Francisco Cervelli

Coaches: Allard Baird, Sal Fasano, Alex Maestri, Frank Menechino, Lipso Nava, Jorge Posada, Dave Righetti and Ron Wotus

Player	No.	Pos.	Date of birth (age)	Team	League	Birthplace
Samuel Aldegheri	12	LHP	September 19, 2001 (aged 24)	(United States) Los Angeles Angels	Major League Baseball	(Italy) Verona
Dan Altavilla	53	RHP	September 8, 1992 (aged 33)	(United States) Minnesota Twins (minors)	Minor League Baseball	(United States) Greenock, Pennsylvania
Andrés Annunziata	77	C	December 5, 2005 (aged 20)	(Italy) Nettuno 1945	Serie A1	Cagua, Venezuela
Sam Antonacci	10	IF	February 6, 2003 (aged 23)	(United States) Chicago White Sox (minors)	Minor League Baseball	(United States) Springfield, Illinois
Jon Berti	1	IF	January 22, 1990 (aged 36)	Free agent		(United States) Troy, Michigan
Jac Caglianone	14	RF/1B	February 9, 2003 (aged 23)	(United States) Kansas City Royals	Major League Baseball	(United States) Tampa, Florida
Dominic Canzone	8	OF	August 16, 1997 (aged 28)	(United States) Seattle Mariners	Major League Baseball	(United States) Cleveland, Ohio
Dylan DeLucia	22	RHP	August 1, 2000 (aged 25)	(United States) Cleveland Guardians (minors)	Minor League Baseball	(United States) Port Orange, Florida
Zach Dezenzo	4	IF	May 11, 2000 (aged 25)	(United States) Houston Astros	Major League Baseball	(United States) Canton, Ohio
J.J. D'Orazio	28	C	December 28, 2001 (aged 24)	(United States) Los Angeles Angels (minors)	Minor League Baseball	Maracay, Venezuela
Andrew Fischer	11	IF	June 3, 2004 (aged 21)	(United States) Milwaukee Brewers (minors)	Minor League Baseball	(United States) Brick Township, New Jersey
Matt Festa	52	RHP	March 11, 1993 (aged 32)	(United States) Cleveland Guardians	Major League Baseball	(United States) Brooklyn, New York
Mickey Gasper	30	C	October 11, 1995 (aged 30)	(United States) Boston Red Sox	Major League Baseball	(United States) Merrimack, New Hampshire
Gordon Graceffo	44	RHP	March 17, 2000 (aged 25)	(United States) St. Louis Cardinals	Major League Baseball	(United States) Wayne, New Jersey
Alek Jacob	37	RHP	June 16, 1998 (aged 27)	(United States) San Diego Padres	Major League Baseball	(United States) Spokane, Washington
Joe La Sorsa	75	LHP	April 29, 1998 (aged 27)	(United States) Pittsburgh Pirates (minors)	Minor League Baseball	(United States) Mount Kisco, New York
Michael Lorenzen	24	RHP	January 4, 1992 (aged 34)	(United States) Colorado Rockies	Major League Baseball	(United States) Anaheim, California
Ron Marinaccio	97	RHP	July 1, 1995 (aged 30)	(United States) San Diego Padres	Major League Baseball	(United States) Toms River, New Jersey
Jakob Marsee	2	IF	June 28, 2001 (aged 24)	(United States) Miami Marlins	Major League Baseball	(United States) Dearborn, Michigan
Renzo Martini	41	IF	August 25, 1992 (aged 33)	San Marino Baseball Club	Serie A1	Valera, Venezuela
Miles Mastrobuoni	5	UTL	October 31, 1995 (aged 30)	(United States) Seattle Mariners	Major League Baseball	(United States) San Ramon, California
Nick Morabito	7	OF	May 7, 2003 (aged 22)	(United States) New York Mets (minors)	Minor League Baseball	(United States) McLean, Virginia
Kyle Nicolas	19	RHP	February 22, 1999 (aged 27)	(United States) Pittsburgh Pirates	Major League Baseball	(United States) Massillon, Ohio
Aaron Nola	27	RHP	June 4, 1993 (aged 32)	(United States) Philadelphia Phillies	Major League Baseball	(United States) Baton Rouge, Louisiana
Dante Nori	16	OF	October 7, 2004 (aged 21)	(United States) Philadelphia Phillies (minors)	Minor League Baseball	(Canada) Toronto, Ontario
Adam Ottavino	0	RHP	November 22, 1985 (aged 40)	Free agent		(United States) Manhattan, New York
Vinnie Pasquantino (C)	9	1B	October 10, 1997 (aged 28)	(United States) Kansas City Royals	Major League Baseball	(United States) Richmond, Virginia
Brayan Rocchio	13	IF	January 13, 2001 (aged 25)	(United States) Cleveland Guardians	Major League Baseball	Caracas, Venezuela
Thomas Saggese	6	IF	April 10, 2002 (aged 23)	(United States) St. Louis Cardinals	Major League Baseball	(United States) Carlsbad, California
Claudio Scotti	98	RHP	July 8, 1998 (aged 27)	(Italy) Parma Baseball	Serie A1	(Italy) Rome
Kyle Teel	3	C	February 15, 2002 (aged 24)	(United States) Chicago White Sox	Major League Baseball	(United States) Ridgewood, New Jersey
Gabriele Quattrini	80	RHP	July 18, 1996 (aged 29)	(Italy) Macerata Angels	Serie A1	(Italy) Potenza Picena
Greg Weissert	57	RHP	February 4, 1995 (aged 31)	(United States) Boston Red Sox	Major League Baseball	(United States) Bay Shore, New York

Designated Pitcher Pool: Matteo Bocchi, Jonah Dipoto, Joe Jacques, Camden Minacci, and Mattia Sireus

=== Great Britain ===
Manager: Brad Marcelino

Coaches: Conor Brooks, Liam Carroll, Albert Cartwright, Barry Enright, Zach Graefser, Dillon Lawson, TS Reed, Jeff Salazar, Tanner Swanson and Matt Talarico

Player	No.	Pos.	Date of birth (age)	Team	League	Birthplace
Jack Anderson	62	RHP	23 November 1999 (aged 26)	(United States) Boston Red Sox (minors)	Minor League Baseball	(United States) Tampa, Florida
Brendan Beck	19	RHP	6 October 1998 (aged 27)	(United States) New York Yankees (minors)	Minor League Baseball	(United States) La Jolla, California
Tristan Beck	43	RHP	24 June 1996 (aged 29)	(United States) San Francisco Giants	Major League Baseball	(United States) Corona, California
Donovan Benoit	41	RHP	22 January 1999 (aged 27)	(United States) Gastonia Ghost Peppers	Atlantic League of Professional Baseball	(United States) Key West, Florida
Jazz Chisholm Jr. (C)	3	IF	1 February 1998 (aged 28)	(United States) New York Yankees	Major League Baseball	Nassau, The Bahamas
Wallace Clark	10	IF	8 June 2002 (aged 23)	(United States) Arizona Diamondbacks (minors)	Minor League Baseball	(United Kingdom) London
Dylan Covey	33	RHP	14 August 1991 (aged 34)	Free agent		(United States) Glendale, California
Will Cresswell	30	C	18 August 2003 (aged 22)	(Canada) Toronto Blue Jays (minors)	Minor League Baseball	(United States) Tacoma, Washington
Nate Eaton	18	UTL	22 December 1996 (aged 29)	(United States) Boston Red Sox	Major League Baseball	(United States) Chester, Virginia
Chavez Fernander	46	RHP	7 July 1997 (aged 28)	(Mexico) Acereros de Monclova	Mexican League	Freeport, The Bahamas
Harry Ford (C)	1	C	21 February 2003 (aged 23)	(United States) Washington Nationals	Major League Baseball	(United States) Atlanta, Georgia
Lucius Fox	9	IF	2 July 1997 (aged 28)	Free agent		Nassau, The Bahamas
Gary Gill Hill	17	RHP	20 September 2004 (aged 21)	(United States) Tampa Bay Rays (minors)	Minor League Baseball	(United States) New Rochelle, New York
Ivan Johnson	15	IF	11 October 1998 (aged 27)	(United States) Cincinnati Reds (minors)	Minor League Baseball	(United States) Atlanta, Georgia
Antonio Knowles	53	RHP	15 January 2000 (aged 26)	(United States) Los Angeles Dodgers (minors)	Minor League Baseball	(United States) Key West, Florida
Matt Koperniak	29	OF	8 February 1998 (aged 28)	(United States) St. Louis Cardinals (minors)	Minor League Baseball	(United Kingdom) London
Miles Langhorne	45	RHP	30 April 2003 (aged 22)	(United States) Milwaukee Brewers (minors)	Minor League Baseball	(United States) Greenwich, Connecticut
Ian Lewis Jr.	6	IF	4 February 2003 (aged 23)	(United States) Miami Marlins (minors)	Minor League Baseball	Nassau, The Bahamas
Ryan Long	35	RHP	19 October 1999 (aged 26)	(United States) Baltimore Orioles (minors)	Minor League Baseball	(United States) Woodinville, Washington
BJ Murray	7	IF	5 January 2000 (aged 26)	(United States) Chicago Cubs (minors)	Minor League Baseball	Nassau, The Bahamas
Michael Petersen	22	RHP	16 May 1994 (aged 31)	(United States) Miami Marlins	Major League Baseball	(United Kingdom) London
Kristian Robinson	59	OF	11 December 2000 (aged 25)	(United States) Arizona Diamondbacks (minors)	Minor League Baseball	Nassau, The Bahamas
Andre Scrubb	70	RHP	13 January 1995 (aged 31)	Free agent		(United States) Fort Bragg, North Carolina
Jack Seppings	27	RHP	3 July 2002 (aged 23)	(United States) Milwaukee Brewers (minors)	Minor League Baseball	(United States) Stillwater, Minnesota
Graham Spraker	96	RHP	19 March 1995 (aged 30)	Free agent		(United States) Green Bay, Wisconsin
Trayce Thompson	28	OF	15 March 1991 (aged 34)	Free agent		(United States) Los Angeles, California
Najer Victor	8	RHP	28 November 2001 (aged 24)	(United States) Los Angeles Angels (minors)	Minor League Baseball	(United States) Philadelphia, Pennsylvania
Tyler Viza	21	RHP	21 October 1994 (aged 31)	(Mexico) Conspiradores de Querétaro	Mexican League	(United States) Phoenix, Arizona
Nick Ward	5	IF	19 October 1995 (aged 30)	(United States) Lancaster Stormers	Atlantic League of Professional Baseball	(United States) Kennett Square, Pennsylvania
Nick Wells	23	LHP	21 February 1996 (aged 30)	(Mexico) Leones de Yucatán	Mexican League	(United States) Alexandria, Virginia
Owen Wild	34	RHP	30 July 2002 (aged 23)	(United States) Tampa Bay Rays (minors)	Minor League Baseball	(United States) Sacramento, California
Vance Worley	49	RHP	25 September 1987 (aged 38)	Free agent		(United States) Sacramento, California
Justin Wylie	13	OF	26 August 1996 (aged 29)	(United States) Gastonia Ghost Peppers	Atlantic League of Professional Baseball	(United States) Lancaster, Pennsylvania

Designated Pitcher Pool: Wes Burton, Jharel Cotton, Jacob Esch, Justin Friedman, Andre Scrubb and Alex Webb

=== Brazil ===
Manager: Daniel Yuichi Matsumoto

Coaches: Thiago Caldeira, Yan Gomes, Marcos “Sossa” Guimarães, Felipe Natel, Kléber Ojima, Pedro Ivo Okuda, Paulo Orlando, André Rienzo and Reinaldo Sato,

Player	No.	Pos.	Date of birth (age)	Team	League	Birthplace
Gabriel Barbosa	31	RHP	January 22, 2001 (aged 25)	(United States) Philadelphia Phillies (minors)	Minor League Baseball	(Brazil) Bastos
Dante Bichette Jr.	77	IF	September 26, 1992 (aged 33)	Free agent		(United States) Orlando, Florida
Gabriel do Carmo	7	C	May 17, 1995 (aged 30)	(France) Senart Templiers	French Division 1	(Brazil) Marília
Osvaldo Carvalho	6	OF	August 6, 2001 (aged 24)	(Brazil) Dourados FA	Campeonato Brasileiro de Beisebol	(Brazil) São Paulo
Joseph Contreras	21	RHP	May 6, 2008 (aged 17)	(United States) Blessed Trinity Catholic High School	Georgia Independent School Association	(United States) Alpharetta, Georgia
Tiago da Silva	22	RHP	March 28, 1985 (aged 40)	(Mexico) Algodoneros de Unión Laguna	Mexican League	(Brazil) São Paulo
Caio de Araujo	8	RHP	February 7, 2002 (aged 24)	(United States) Alabama State Hornets	NCAA Division I (Southwestern Athletic Conference)	(Brazil) Indaiatuba
Gabriel Gomes	28	C	March 31, 2004 (aged 21)	(Brazil) Marília	Campeonato Brasileiro de Beisebol	(Brazil) Atibaia
Murilo Gouvea	34	RHP	September 15, 1988 (aged 37)	(Brazil) Dourados FA	Campeonato Brasileiro de Beisebol	(Brazil) Atibaia
Victor Ito	1	IF	February 16, 1995 (aged 31)	(Brazil) Marília	Campeonato Brasileiro de Beisebol	(Brazil) Marília
Hugo Kanabushi	66	LHP	May 22, 1989 (aged 36)	(Brazil) Dourados FA	Campeonato Brasileiro de Beisebol	(Brazil) Maringá
Felipe Koragi	2	IF	January 23, 2004 (aged 22)	(Japan) MJG Shimane	Japanese Industrial League	(Brazil) Indaiatuba
Pedro Lemos	38	RHP	May 22, 2003 (aged 22)	(United States) Seattle Mariners (minors)	Minor League Baseball	(Brazil) Santo Andre
Tomas Lopez	35	RHP	December 10, 2004 (aged 21)	(United States) Columbia Lions	NCAA Division I (Ivy League)	(United States) Torrance, California
Gabriel Maciel	3	OF	January 10, 1999 (aged 27)	(United States) Sussex County Miners	Frontier League	(Brazil) Londrina
Joao Gabriel Marostica	0	RHP	November 8, 2004 (aged 21)	(Japan) Tochigi Golden Braves	Baseball Challenge League	(Brazil) São Paulo
Victor Mascai	17	OF	February 10, 2001 (aged 25)	(Italy) Nettuno Baseball Club	Serie A1	(Brazil) Marília
Felipe Mizukosi	39	IF	November 26, 1994 (aged 31)	(Brazil) Gecebs	Campeonato Brasileiro de Beisebol	(Brazil) São Paulo
Oscar Nakaoshi	41	LHP	March 28, 1991 (aged 34)	(Japan) ENAGIC	Japanese Industrial League	(Brazil) São Paulo
Tiago Nishiyama	12	IF	November 20, 2005 (aged 20)	(Japan) Nittaidai	Japanese College	(Brazil) São Paulo
Eric Pardinho	43	RHP	January 5, 2001 (aged 25)	(Mexico) Saraperos de Saltillo	Mexican League	(Brazil) São Paulo
Lucas Ramirez	24	OF	January 16, 2006 (aged 20)	(United States) Los Angeles Angels (minors)	Minor League Baseball	(United States) Weston, Florida
Leonardo Reginatto (C)	5	IF	April 10, 1990 (aged 35)	Free agent		(Brazil) Curitiba
Pietro Rienzo	40	RHP	March 15, 2008 (aged 17)	(United States) Pittsburgh Pirates (minors)	Minor League Baseball	(Brazil) Bragança Paulista
Lucas Rojo	15	IF	April 5, 1994 (aged 31)	(Brazil) Dourados FA	Campeonato Brasileiro de Beisebol	(Brazil) Ibiúna
Enzo Sawayama	18	LHP	October 15, 2003 (aged 22)	(Japan) Yamaha	Japanese Industrial League	Hamamatsu, Shizuoka, Japan
Matheus Silva	13	C	June 12, 2002 (aged 23)	(Brazil) Nippon Blue Jays	Campeonato Brasileiro de Beisebol	(Brazil) Bastos
Bo Takahashi	36	RHP	January 23, 1997 (aged 29)	(Japan) Saitama Seibu Lions	Nippon Professional Baseball	(Brazil) São Paulo
Thyago Vieira	49	RHP	January 7, 1993 (aged 33)	(Mexico) Toros de Tijuana	Mexican League	(Brazil) São Paulo
Hector Villarroel	4	LHP	August 12, 1995 (aged 30)	(United States) Los Angeles Angels (minors)	Minor League Baseball	El Tigre, Venezuela

Designated Pitcher Pool: Joao Gabriel Marostica, Vitor Takahashi, Heitor Tokar, and Marcelo Young

== Pool C ==
=== Japan ===
Manager: Hirokazu Ibata

Player	No.	Pos.	Date of birth (age)	Team	League	Birthplace
Sōsuke Genda	6	IF	February 16, 1993 (aged 33)	(Japan) Saitama Seibu Lions	Nippon Professional Baseball	(Japan) Ōita, Ōita
Daichi Ishii	69	RHP	July 29, 1997 (aged 28)	(Japan) Hanshin Tigers	Nippon Professional Baseball	(Japan) Akita, Akita
Hiromi Itoh	14	RHP	August 31, 1997 (aged 28)	(Japan) Hokkaido Nippon Ham Fighters	Nippon Professional Baseball	(Japan) Kayabe, Hokkaido
Yumeto Kanemaru	24	LHP	February 1, 2003 (aged 23)	(Japan) Chunichi Dragons	Nippon Professional Baseball	(Japan) Kobe, Hyōgo
Yusei Kikuchi	17	LHP	June 17, 1991 (aged 34)	(United States) Los Angeles Angels	Major League Baseball	(Japan) Morioka, Iwate
Koki Kitayama	57	RHP	April 10, 1999 (aged 26)	(Japan) Hokkaido Nippon-Ham Fighters	Nippon Professional Baseball	(Japan) Keihoku, Kyoto
Kensuke Kondoh	8	OF	August 9, 1993 (aged 32)	(Japan) Fukuoka SoftBank Hawks	Nippon Professional Baseball	(Japan) Midori-ku, Chiba
Kaito Kozono	3	IF	June 7, 2000 (aged 25)	(Japan) Hiroshima Toyo Carp	Nippon Professional Baseball	(Japan) Takarazuka, Hyōgo
Shugo Maki	2	IF	April 21, 1998 (aged 27)	(Japan) Yokohama DeNA BayStars	Nippon Professional Baseball	(Japan) Nakano, Nagano
Taisei Makihara	5	IF	October 15, 1992 (aged 33)	(Japan) Fukuoka SoftBank Hawks	Nippon Professional Baseball	(Japan) Kurume, Fukuoka
Yuki Matsumoto	66	RHP	April 14, 1996 (aged 29)	(Japan) Fukuoka SoftBank Hawks	Nippon Professional Baseball	(Japan) Yokohama, Kanagawa
Hiroya Miyagi	13	LHP	August 25, 2001 (aged 24)	(Japan) Orix Buffaloes	Nippon Professional Baseball	(Japan) Ginowan, Okinawa
Shōta Morishita	23	OF	August 14, 2000 (aged 25)	(Japan) Hanshin Tigers	Nippon Professional Baseball	(Japan) Yokohama, Kanagawa
Munetaka Murakami	55	IF	February 2, 2000 (aged 26)	(United States) Chicago White Sox	Major League Baseball	(Japan) Kumamoto, Kumamoto
Yuhei Nakamura	27	C	June 17, 1990 (aged 35)	(Japan) Tokyo Yakult Swallows	Nippon Professional Baseball	(Japan) Ōno, Fukui
Shohei Ohtani	16	DH	July 5, 1994 (aged 31)	(United States) Los Angeles Dodgers	Major League Baseball	(Japan) Mizusawa, Iwate
Kazuma Okamoto	25	IF	June 30, 1996 (aged 29)	(Canada) Toronto Blue Jays	Major League Baseball	(Japan) Gojō, Nara
Taisei Ota	15	RHP	June 29, 1999 (aged 26)	(Japan) Yomiuri Giants	Nippon Professional Baseball	(Japan) Taka, Hyōgo
Seishirō Sakamoto	12	C	November 10, 1993 (aged 32)	(Japan) Hanshin Tigers	Nippon Professional Baseball	(Japan) Yabu, Hyōgo
Teruaki Satō	7	IF	March 13, 1999 (aged 26)	(Japan) Hanshin Tigers	Nippon Professional Baseball	(Japan) Nishinomiya, Hyōgo
Ukyo Shuto	20	OF	February 10, 1996 (aged 30)	(Japan) Fukuoka SoftBank Hawks	Nippon Professional Baseball	(Japan) Ōta, Gunma
Ryuhei Sotani	47	LHP	November 30, 2000 (aged 25)	(Japan) Orix Buffaloes	Nippon Professional Baseball	(Japan) Nara, Nara
Tomoyuki Sugano	19	RHP	October 11, 1989 (aged 36)	(United States) Colorado Rockies	Major League Baseball	(Japan) Sagamihara, Kanagawa
Seiya Suzuki	51	OF	August 18, 1994 (aged 31)	(United States) Chicago Cubs	Major League Baseball	(Japan) Tokyo
Kaima Taira	61	RHP	November 15, 1999 (aged 26)	(Japan) Saitama Seibu Lions	Nippon Professional Baseball	(Japan) Ishigaki, Okinawa
Hiroto Takahashi	28	RHP	August 9, 2002 (aged 23)	(Japan) Chunichi Dragons	Nippon Professional Baseball	(Japan) Owariasahi, Aichi
Atsuki Taneichi	26	RHP	September 7, 1998 (aged 27)	(Japan) Chiba Lotte Marines	Nippon Professional Baseball	(Japan) Misawa, Aomori
Kenya Wakatsuki	4	C	October 4, 1995 (aged 30)	(Japan) Orix Buffaloes	Nippon Professional Baseball	(Japan) Kazo, Saitama
Yoshinobu Yamamoto	18	RHP	August 17, 1998 (aged 27)	(United States) Los Angeles Dodgers	Major League Baseball	(Japan) Bizen, Okayama
Masataka Yoshida	34	OF	July 15, 1993 (aged 32)	(United States) Boston Red Sox	Major League Baseball	(Japan) Fukui, Fukui

Designated Pitcher Pool: Shoma Fujihira, Tatsuya Imai, Yumeto Kanemaru, Shinnosuke Ogasawara, Kazuki Sugiyama and Chihiro Sumida

=== Australia ===
Manager: Dave Nilsson

Coaches: Chris Adamson, Jim Bennett, Michael Collins, Andrew Graham, Graeme Lloyd and Shayne Watson

Player	No.	Pos.	Date of birth (age)	Team	League	Birthplace
Travis Bazzana	64	IF	28 August 2002 (aged 23)	(United States) Cleveland Guardians (minors)	Minor League Baseball	(Australia) Sydney, New South Wales
Ulrich Bojarski	25	OF	15 September 1998 (aged 27)	(Australia) Melbourne Aces	Ulsan-KBO Fall League	East London, South Africa
Chris Burke	34	UTL	16 August 2001 (aged 24)	(Australia) Melbourne Aces	Ulsan-KBO Fall League	(Australia) Melbourne, Victoria
George Callil	28	IF	22 July 1997 (aged 28)	(Australia) Brisbane Bandits	Australian Baseball League	(Australia) Melbourne, Victoria
Jarryd Dale	43	IF	11 September 2000 (aged 25)	(South Korea) Kia Tigers	KBO League	(Australia) Melbourne, Victoria
Max Durrington	36	UTL	13 February 2007 (aged 19)	(United States) Athletics (minors)	Minor League Baseball	(Australia) Tweed Heads, New South Wales
Mitchell Edwards	1	C	1 August 1999 (aged 26)	(Australia) Adelaide Giants	Australian Baseball League	(Australia) Melbourne, Victoria
Robbie Glendinning	6	IF	6 October 1995 (aged 30)	(United States) Kansas City Monarchs	American Association of Professional Baseball	Perth, Western Australia
Alex Hall	10	C	8 June 1999 (aged 26)	(South Korea) Ulsan Whales	KBO Futures League	(Australia) Melbourne, Victoria
Kieren Hall	46	RHP	10 May 2001 (aged 24)	(Australia) Perth Heat	Australian Baseball League	Perth, Western Australia
Ky Hampton	26	RHP	4 October 2000 (aged 25)	(Australia) Adelaide Giants	Australian Baseball League	Mount Barker, Western Australia
Josh Hendrickson	44	LHP	18 September 1997 (aged 28)	(United States) Kansas City Monarchs	American Association of Professional Baseball	Perth, Western Australia
Sam Holland	40	RHP	20 February 1994 (aged 32)	(Australia) Brisbane Bandits	Australian Baseball League	(Australia) Brisbane, Queensland
Jon Kennedy	55	LHP	20 September 1994 (aged 31)	(Australia) Brisbane Bandits	Australian Baseball League	(Australia) Melbourne, Victoria
Tim Kennelly (C)	23	OF	5 December 1986 (aged 39)	(Australia) Perth Heat	Australian Baseball League	Perth, Western Australia
Connor MacDonald	39	RHP	27 February 1996 (aged 30)	(Australia) Brisbane Bandits	Australian Baseball League	(Australia) Brisbane, Queensland
Curtis Mead	16	IF	26 October 2000 (aged 25)	(United States) Chicago White Sox	Major League Baseball	Adelaide, South Australia
Cooper Morgan	65	LHP	8 November 2001 (aged 24)	(Australia) Adelaide Giants	Australian Baseball League	(Australia) Canberra
Mitch Neunborn	22	RHP	27 June 1997 (aged 28)	(United States) Philadelphia Phillies (minors)	Minor League Baseball	Johannesburg, South Africa
Jack O'Loughlin	37	LHP	14 March 2000 (aged 25)	(Australia) Adelaide Giants	Australian Baseball League	Adelaide, South Australia
Robbie Perkins	9	C	29 May 1994 (aged 31)	(Australia) Brisbane Bandits	Australian Baseball League	(Australia) Canberra
Warwick Saupold (C)	30	RHP	16 January 1990 (aged 36)	(Australia) Perth Heat	Australian Baseball League	Perth, Western Australia
Blake Townsend	54	LHP	5 April 2001 (aged 24)	(United States) Texas Rangers (minors)	Minor League Baseball	(Australia) Traralgon, Victoria
Todd Van Steensel	21	RHP	14 January 1991 (aged 35)	(Australia) Adelaide Giants	Australian Baseball League	(Australia) Sydney, New South Wales
Logan Wade	4	IF	13 November 1991 (aged 34)	(Australia) Brisbane Bandits	Australian Baseball League	(Australia) Brisbane, Queensland
Alex Wells	8	LHP	27 February 1997 (aged 29)	(Australia) Sydney Blue Sox	Australian Baseball League	(Australia) Newcastle, New South Wales
Lachlan Wells	19	LHP	27 February 1997 (aged 29)	(South Korea) LG Twins	KBO League	(Australia) Newcastle, New South Wales
Coen Wynne	38	RHP	25 January 1999 (aged 27)	(Australia) Sydney Blue Sox	Australian Baseball League	(Australia) Westmead, New South Wales
Aaron Whitefield	2	OF	2 September 1996 (aged 29)	(Australia) Melbourne Aces	Ulsan-KBO Fall League	(Australia) Brisbane, Queensland
Rixon Wingrove	52	IF	23 May 2000 (aged 25)	(United States) Kansas City Monarchs	American Association of Professional Baseball	(Australia) Newcastle, New South Wales

Designated Pitcher Pool: Cameron Gibbens, Kailen Hamson, Liam Hendriks, Lewis Thorpe and Kai-Noa Wynyard

=== South Korea ===
Manager: 6 Ryu Ji-hyun

Coaches: Bench 21 Kang In-kwon, Hitting 89 Lee Jin-young, Pitching 77 Kim Kwang-sam, First base 85 Lee Dong-wook, Third base 72 Kim Jae-gul, Bullpen 88 Ryu Taek-hyun, Quality control 92 Choi Won-ho, Training 75 Kim Yong-il

Player	No.	Pos.	Date of birth (age)	Team	League	Birthplace
Ahn Hyun-min	23	OF	August 22, 2003 (aged 22)	(South Korea) KT Wiz	KBO League	(South Korea) Gimhae
Dane Dunning	33	RHP	December 20, 1994 (aged 31)	(United States) Seattle Mariners (minors)	Minor League Baseball	(United States) Orange Park, Florida
Go Woo-suk	19	RHP	August 6, 1998 (aged 27)	(United States) Detroit Tigers (minors)	Minor League Baseball	(South Korea) Incheon
Gwak Been	47	RHP	May 28, 1998 (aged 27)	(South Korea) Doosan Bears	KBO League	(South Korea) Seoul
Jeong Woo-joo	61	RHP	November 7, 2006 (aged 19)	(South Korea) Hanwha Eagles	KBO League	(South Korea) Namyangju
Jo Byeong-hyeon	11	RHP	May 8, 2002 (aged 23)	(South Korea) SSG Landers	KBO League	(South Korea) Asan
Jahmai Jones	15	OF	August 4, 1997 (aged 28)	(United States) Detroit Tigers	Major League Baseball	(United States) Roswell, Georgia
Kim Do-yeong	5	IF	October 2, 2003 (aged 22)	(South Korea) Kia Tigers	KBO League	(South Korea) Gwangju
Kim Hye-seong	3	IF	January 27, 1999 (aged 27)	(United States) Los Angeles Dodgers	Major League Baseball	(South Korea) Goyang
Kim Hyung-jun	25	C	November 2, 1999 (aged 26)	(South Korea) NC Dinos	KBO League	(South Korea) Seoul
Kim Ju-won	7	IF	July 30, 2002 (aged 23)	(South Korea) NC Dinos	KBO League	(South Korea) Gunpo
Kim Taek-yeon	63	RHP	June 3, 2005 (aged 20)	(South Korea) Doosan Bears	KBO League	(South Korea) Incheon
Kim Young-kyu	14	LHP	February 10, 2000 (aged 26)	(South Korea) NC Dinos	KBO League	(South Korea) Gwangju
Ko Young-pyo	1	RHP	September 16, 1991 (aged 34)	(South Korea) KT Wiz	KBO League	(South Korea) Naju
Koo Ja-wook	65	OF	February 12, 1993 (aged 33)	(South Korea) Samsung Lions	KBO League	(South Korea) Daegu
Lee Jung-hoo (C)	22	OF	August 20, 1998 (aged 27)	(United States) San Francisco Giants	Major League Baseball	Nagoya, Aichi, Japan
Moon Bo-gyeong	2	IF	July 19, 2000 (aged 25)	(South Korea) LG Twins	KBO League	(South Korea) Seoul
Moon Hyun-bin	51	OF	April 20, 2004 (aged 21)	(South Korea) Hanwha Eagles	KBO League	(South Korea) Daejeon
Noh Kyung-eun	38	RHP	March 11, 1984 (aged 41)	(South Korea) SSG Landers	KBO League	(South Korea) Hampyeong
Park Dong-won	27	C	May 7, 1990 (aged 35)	(South Korea) LG Twins	KBO League	(South Korea) Busan
Park Hae-min	17	OF	February 24, 1990 (aged 36)	(South Korea) LG Twins	KBO League	(South Korea) Seoul
Park Yeong-hyun	60	RHP	October 11, 2003 (aged 22)	(South Korea) KT Wiz	KBO League	(South Korea) Gurye
Roh Si-hwan	8	IF	December 3, 2000 (aged 25)	(South Korea) Hanwha Eagles	KBO League	(South Korea) Ulsan
Ryu Hyun-jin	99	LHP	December 25, 1987 (aged 38)	(South Korea) Hanwha Eagles	KBO League	(South Korea) Incheon
Shin Min-jae	4	IF	January 21, 1996 (aged 30)	(South Korea) LG Twins	KBO League	(South Korea) Incheon
So Hyeong-jun	30	RHP	September 16, 2001 (aged 24)	(South Korea) KT Wiz	KBO League	(South Korea) Uijeongbu
Son Ju-young	29	LHP	December 2, 1998 (aged 27)	(South Korea) LG Twins	KBO League	(South Korea) Ulsan
Song Seung-ki	66	LHP	April 10, 2002 (aged 23)	(South Korea) LG Twins	KBO League	(South Korea) Siheung
Shay Whitcomb	10	IF	September 28, 1998 (aged 27)	(United States) Houston Astros	Major League Baseball	(United States) Thousand Oaks, California
You Young-chan	54	RHP	March 7, 1997 (aged 28)	(South Korea) LG Twins	KBO League	(South Korea) Ansan

Designated Pitcher Pool: Bae Chan-seung, Kim Taek-yeon, (Note: Kim and You were deployed prior to the pool stage.) Moon Dong-ju and You Young-chan

=== Czech Republic ===
Manager: Pavel Chadim

Player	No.	Pos.	Date of birth (age)	Team	League	Birthplace
Jeff Barto	19	LHP	September 15, 1989 (aged 36)	(Czech Republic) Třebíč Nuclears	Czech Baseball Extraliga	(United States) Boise, Idaho
Matouš Bubeník	21	C	October 28, 2005 (aged 20)	(United States) UNC Wilmington Seahawks	NCAA Division I (CAA)	(Czech Republic) Prague
Filip Čapka	14	RHP	November 4, 1998 (aged 27)	(Czech Republic) Draci Brno	Czech Baseball Extraliga	(Czech Republic) Brno
Martin Červenka	55	C	August 3, 1992 (aged 33)	(Czech Republic) Kotlářka Praha	Czech Baseball Extraliga	(Czech Republic) Prague
Martin Červinka	8	IF	March 3, 1997 (aged 29)	(Czech Republic) Draci Brno	Czech Baseball Extraliga	(Czech Republic) Brno
Marek Chlup	73	OF	January 9, 1999 (aged 27)	(Mexico) Caliente de Durango	Mexican League	(Czech Republic) Český Dub
Tomáš Duffek	7	LHP	September 12, 1989 (aged 36)	(Czech Republic) Eagles Praha	Czech Baseball Extraliga	(Czech Republic) Prague
Lukáš Ercoli	63	LHP	April 17, 1996 (aged 29)	(Czech Republic) Kotlářka Praha	Czech Baseball Extraliga	(Czech Republic) Roudnice
William Escala	5	OF	December 11, 1998 (aged 27)	(Czech Republic) Cardion Hroši Brno	Czech Baseball Extraliga	(United States) Miami, Florida
Lukáš Hlouch	88	RHP	December 12, 2000 (aged 25)	(Czech Republic) Třebíč Nuclears	Czech Baseball Extraliga	(Czech Republic) Třebíč
Ryan Johnson	30	IF	September 29, 1992 (aged 33)	(Czech Republic) Třebíč Nuclears	Czech Baseball Extraliga	(Canada) Winnipeg, Manitoba
Filip Kollmann	26	RHP	June 22, 2005 (aged 20)	(United States) Arizona Western Matadors	NJCAA	(Czech Republic) Třebíč
Michal Kovala	3	LHP	December 28, 2003 (aged 22)	(United States) Chipola Indians	NJCAA	(Czech Republic) Ostrava
Marek Krejčiřík	97	OF	June 27, 2001 (aged 24)	(Czech Republic) Třebíč Nuclears	Czech Baseball Extraliga	(Czech Republic) Brno
Vojtěch Menšík	17	IF	May 24, 1998 (aged 27)	(Czech Republic) Cardion Hroši Brno	Czech Baseball Extraliga	(Czech Republic) Brno
Marek Minařík	15	RHP	June 28, 1993 (aged 32)	(Czech Republic) Kotlářka Praha	Czech Baseball Extraliga	(Czech Republic) Louny
Martin Mužík (C)	49	UTL	April 23, 1996 (aged 29)	(Czech Republic) Sokol Hluboká	Czech Baseball Extraliga	(Czech Republic) České Budějovice
Jan Novák	18	LHP	January 19, 1994 (aged 32)	(Czech Republic) Kotlářka Praha	Czech Baseball Extraliga	(Czech Republic) Prague
Tomáš Ondra	57	LHP	March 20, 1996 (aged 29)	(Czech Republic) Arrows Ostrava	Czech Baseball Extraliga	(Czech Republic) Ostrava
Daniel Padyšák	42	RHP	July 2, 2000 (aged 25)	(Czech Republic) Kotlářka Praha	Czech Baseball Extraliga	(Czech Republic) Prague
Jan Pospíšil	27	IF	October 21, 2003 (aged 22)	(United States) North Greenville Trailblazers	NCAA Div. II (Conf. Carolinas)	(Czech Republic) Brno
Max Prejda	2	OF	June 6, 2007 (aged 18)	(Czech Republic) Kotlářka Praha	Czech Baseball Extraliga	(Czech Republic) Prague
Milan Prokop	56	IF	February 12, 2003 (aged 23)	(Czech Republic) Draci Brno	Czech Baseball Extraliga	(Czech Republic) Brno
Ondřej Satoria	35	RHP	February 26, 1997 (aged 29)	(Czech Republic) Arrows Ostrava	Czech Baseball Extraliga	(Czech Republic) Ostrava
Martin Schneider	13	RHP	March 4, 1986 (aged 40)	(Czech Republic) Draci Brno	Czech Baseball Extraliga	(Czech Republic) Olomouc
Michal Sindelka	11	OF	November 4, 2005 (aged 20)	(United States) Chipola Indians	NJCAA	(Czech Republic) Brno
Ondřej Vank	23	RHP	April 25, 2005 (aged 20)	(United States) Northeastern Plainsmen	NJCAA	(Czech Republic) Prague
Terrin Vavra	6	UTL	May 12, 1997 (aged 28)	Free agent		(United States) Menomonie, Wisconsin
Boris Večerka	54	RHP	August 22, 2003 (aged 22)	(Czech Republic) Draci Brno	Czech Baseball Extraliga	(Czech Republic) Brno
Martin Zelenka	38	C	December 20, 2000 (aged 25)	(Czech Republic) Tempo Praha	Czech Baseball Extraliga	(Czech Republic) Prague

=== Chinese Taipei ===
Cheng Jui Sung replaced Jonathon Long, who missed the tournament after suffering an elbow injury during spring training.

Manager: Hao-jiu Tseng

Player	No.	Pos.	Date of birth (age)	Team	League	Birthplace
Chang Yi	19	RHP	February 26, 1994 (aged 32)	(Taiwan) Fubon Guardians	Chinese Professional Baseball League	(Taiwan) Wanrong
Cheng-Yu Chang	9	IF	June 8, 2000 (aged 25)	(Taiwan) Wei Chuan Dragons	Chinese Professional Baseball League	(Taiwan) Pingtung
Yu Chang	18	IF	August 18, 1995 (aged 30)	(Taiwan) Fubon Guardians	Chinese Professional Baseball League	(Taiwan) Taitung
Shao-Hung Chiang	63	C	July 13, 1997 (aged 28)	(Taiwan) Wei Chuan Dragons	Chinese Professional Baseball League	(Taiwan) Taipei City
Kun-Yu Chiang	90	IF	July 4, 2000 (aged 25)	(Taiwan) CTBC Brothers	Chinese Professional Baseball League	(Taiwan) Taipei City
Hao-Chun Cheng	47	RHP	September 17, 1997 (aged 28)	(Taiwan) CTBC Brothers	Chinese Professional Baseball League	(Taiwan) Taitung
Tsung-Che Cheng	1	IF	July 26, 2001 (aged 24)	(United States) Boston Red Sox	Major League Baseball	(Taiwan) Pingtung
Chen Kuan-yu	20	LHP	October 29, 1990 (aged 35)	(Taiwan) Rakuten Monkeys	Chinese Professional Baseball League	(Taiwan) New Taipei City
Chen Chieh-hsien (C)	24	OF	January 7, 1994 (aged 32)	(Taiwan) Uni-President 7-Eleven Lions	Chinese Professional Baseball League	(Taiwan) Kaohsiung
Po-Yu Chen	44	RHP	October 2, 2001 (aged 24)	(United States) Pittsburgh Pirates (minors)	Minor League Baseball	(Taiwan) Taoyuan City
Chen-Wei Chen	98	OF	December 12, 1997 (aged 28)	(Taiwan) Rakuten Monkeys	Chinese Professional Baseball League	(Taiwan) Taipei City
Stuart Fairchild	17	OF	March 17, 1996 (aged 29)	(United States) Cleveland Guardians (minors)	Minor League Baseball	(United States) Seattle, Washington
Giljegiljaw Kungkuan	4	C	March 13, 1994 (aged 31)	(Taiwan) Wei Chuan Dragons	Chinese Professional Baseball League	(Taiwan) Taichung City
Gu Lin Ruei-yang	11	RHP	June 12, 2000 (aged 25)	(Japan) Hokkaido Nippon-Ham Fighters	Nippon Professional Baseball	(Taiwan) Taichung
Chih-Wei Hu	58	RHP	November 4, 1993 (aged 32)	(Taiwan) Uni-President Lions	Chinese Professional Baseball League	(Taiwan) Taichung
Hsu Jo-Hsi	99	RHP	October 1, 2000 (aged 25)	(Japan) Fukuoka SoftBank Hawks	Nippon Professional Baseball	(Taiwan) Taoyuan
Kai-Wei Lin	0	RHP	March 19, 1996 (aged 29)	(Taiwan) Wei Chuan Dragons	Chinese Professional Baseball League	(Taiwan) New Taipei City
Shih-Hsiang Lin	12	RHP	July 31, 2001 (aged 24)	(Taiwan) TSG Hawks	Chinese Professional Baseball League	(Taiwan) Taitung
Wei-En Lin	42	LHP	November 4, 2005 (aged 20)	(United States) Athletics (minors)	Minor League Baseball	(Taiwan) Taoyuan
Yu-Min Lin	45	LHP	July 12, 2003 (aged 22)	(United States) Arizona Diamondbacks (minors)	Minor League Baseball	(Taiwan) Taitung
Lin An-ko	77	OF	May 19, 1997 (aged 28)	(Japan) Saitama Seibu Lions	Nippon Professional Baseball	(Taiwan) Tainan
Lyle Lin	27	C	June 26, 1997 (aged 28)	(United States) High Point Rockers	Atlantic League of Professional Baseball	(Taiwan) New Taipei City
Tzu-Chen Sha	92	RHP	October 15, 2003 (aged 22)	(United States) Athletics (minors)	Minor League Baseball	(Taiwan) Taipei City
Cheng-Jui Sung	88	OF	August 14, 2002 (aged 23)	(Taiwan) CTBC Brothers	Chinese Professional Baseball League	(Taiwan) New Taipei City
Jyun-Yue Tseng	60	RHP	November 7, 2001 (aged 24)	(Taiwan) Fubon Guardians	Chinese Professional Baseball League	(Taiwan) Taipei City
Tzu-Wei Lin	15	IF	February 15, 1994 (aged 32)	(Taiwan) Rakuten Monkeys	Chinese Professional Baseball League	(Taiwan) Kaohsiung
Sun Yi-Lei	96	RHP	February 10, 2005 (aged 21)	(Japan) Hokkaido Nippon Ham Fighters	Nippon Professional Baseball	(Taiwan) Taipei
Nien-Ting Wu	39	IF	June 7, 1993 (aged 32)	(Taiwan) TSG Hawks	Chinese Professional Baseball League	(Taiwan) Taipei
Jun-Wei Zhang	37	RHP	November 14, 2005 (aged 20)	(Japan) Fukuoka SoftBank Hawks (farm)	NPB Farm League	(Taiwan) Taipei
Chen Zhong-Ao Zhuang	48	RHP	August 25, 2000 (aged 25)	(United States) Athletics (minors)	Minor League Baseball	(Taiwan) Taipei

== Pool D ==
=== Venezuela ===
Pablo López was replaced by Jhonathan Díaz due to an injury. Oddainer Mosqueda, who will also miss the tournament due to an injury, and José Alvarado, because he was unable to obtain insurance, were replaced by Christian Suárez and Luinder Avila. Anthony Molina replaced Germán Márquez, who chose to stay in Spring Training with the San Diego Padres. Yoendrys Gómez withdrew and was substituted by José Álvarez.

Manager: Omar López

Coaches: Miguel Cabrera, Robinson Chirinos, Jorge Córdova, Carlos Méndez, Gerardo Parra, Johan Santana

Player	No.	Pos.	Date of birth (age)	Team	League	Birthplace
Ronald Acuña Jr.	21	OF	December 18, 1997 (aged 28)	(United States) Atlanta Braves	Major League Baseball	(Venezuela) La Guaira
Wilyer Abreu	16	OF	June 24, 1999 (aged 26)	(United States) Boston Red Sox	Major League Baseball	(Venezuela) Maracaibo
José Álvarez	19	LHP	May 6, 1989 (aged 36)	(Mexico) Toros de Tijuana	Mexican League	(Venezuela) Barcelona
Luis Arráez	2	IF	April 9, 1997 (aged 28)	(United States) San Francisco Giants	Major League Baseball	(Venezuela) San Felipe
Luinder Avila	58	RHP	April 9, 1997 (aged 28)	(United States) Kansas City Royals	Major League Baseball	(Venezuela) Caracas
Eduard Bazardo	83	RHP	September 1, 1995 (aged 30)	(United States) Seattle Mariners	Major League Baseball	(Venezuela) Maracaibo
José Buttó	70	RHP	March 19, 1998 (aged 27)	(United States) San Francisco Giants	Major League Baseball	(Venezuela) Cumaná
Jackson Chourio	1	OF	March 11, 2004 (aged 21)	(United States) Milwaukee Brewers	Major League Baseball	(Venezuela) Maracaibo
William Contreras	23	C	December 24, 1997 (aged 28)	(United States) Milwaukee Brewers	Major League Baseball	(Venezuela) Puerto Cabello
Willson Contreras	40	IF	May 13, 1992 (aged 33)	(United States) Boston Red Sox	Major League Baseball	(Venezuela) Puerto Cabello
Enmanuel De Jesús	37	LHP	December 10, 1996 (aged 29)	(United States) Detroit Tigers (minors)	Minor League Baseball	(Venezuela) Valencia
Jhonathan Díaz	74	LHP	March 7, 1996 (aged 29)	(United States) Seattle Mariners (minors)	Minor League Baseball	(Venezuela) Valencia
Maikel García	23	IF	March 3, 2000 (aged 26)	(United States) Kansas City Royals	Major League Baseball	(Venezuela) La Sabana
Andrés Giménez	0	IF	September 4, 1998 (aged 27)	(Canada) Toronto Blue Jays	Major League Baseball	(Venezuela) Barquisimeto
Yoendrys Gómez*	94	RHP	October 15, 1999 (aged 26)	(United States) Tampa Bay Rays	Major League Baseball	(Venezuela) Nirgua
Carlos Guzmán	20	RHP	May 16, 1998 (aged 27)	(United States) New York Mets (minors)	Minor League Baseball	(Venezuela) Maracay
Andrés Machado	30	RHP	July 6, 2000 (aged 25)	(Japan) Orix Buffaloes	Nippon Professional Baseball	(Venezuela) Urama
Anthony Molina	61	RHP	January 12, 2002 (aged 24)	(United States) Atlanta Braves (minors)	Minor League Baseball	(Venezuela) San Joaquín
Keider Montero	54	RHP	July 6, 2000 (aged 25)	(United States) Detroit Tigers	Major League Baseball	(Venezuela) Santa Teresa del Tuy
Daniel Palencia	29	RHP	February 5, 2000 (aged 26)	(United States) Chicago Cubs	Major League Baseball	(Venezuela) San Carlos
Salvador Perez (C)	13	C	May 10, 1990 (aged 35)	(United States) Kansas City Royals	Major League Baseball	(Venezuela) Valencia
Eduardo Rodríguez	52	LHP	April 7, 1993 (aged 32)	(United States) Arizona Diamondbacks	Major League Baseball	(Venezuela) Valencia
Javier Sanoja	4	OF	September 3, 2002 (aged 23)	(United States) Miami Marlins	Major League Baseball	(Venezuela) Maracay
Ricardo Sánchez	64	LHP	April 11, 1997 (aged 28)	(Mexico) Algodoneros de Unión Laguna	Mexican League	(Venezuela) Puerto Cabello
Antonio Senzatela	34	RHP	January 21, 1995 (aged 31)	(United States) Colorado Rockies	Major League Baseball	(Venezuela) Valencia
Christian Suárez	73	LHP	January 12, 2002 (aged 24)	(United States) Los Angeles Dodgers (minors)	Minor League Baseball	(Venezuela) Maracay
Ranger Suárez	55	LHP	August 26, 1995 (aged 30)	(United States) Boston Red Sox	Major League Baseball	(Venezuela) Pies de Cuesta
Eugenio Suárez	7	IF	July 18, 1991 (aged 34)	(United States) Cincinnati Reds	Major League Baseball	(Venezuela) Ciudad Guayana
Gleyber Torres	25	IF	December 13, 1996 (aged 29)	(United States) Detroit Tigers	Major League Baseball	(Venezuela) Caracas
Ezequiel Tovar	14	IF	August 1, 2001 (aged 24)	(United States) Colorado Rockies	Major League Baseball	(Venezuela) Maracay
Ángel Zerpa	61	LHP	September 27, 1999 (aged 26)	(United States) Milwaukee Brewers	Major League Baseball	(Venezuela) Valle de la Pascua

Designated Pitcher Pool: Jesús Luzardo, and Eduardo Salazar

- Withdrew

=== Dominican Republic ===
Juan Mejía replaced Edwin Uceta, who missed the tournament due to a shoulder injury. Junior Lake replaced Johan Rojas who missed the tournament due to testing positive for a banned substance in the days leading up to the tournament.

Manager: Albert Pujols

Coaches: Fleming Báez, Julio Borbón, José Canó, Wellington Cepeda, Carlos Febles, Joel Peralta, Plácido Polanco, René Rojas, Fernando Tatís

Player	No.	Pos.	Date of birth (age)	Team	League	Birthplace
Albert Abreu	54	RHP	September 26, 1995 (aged 30)	(Japan) Chunichi Dragons	Nippon Professional Baseball	(Dominican Republic) Guayubín
Sandy Alcántara	7	RHP	September 7, 1995 (aged 30)	(United States) Miami Marlins	Major League Baseball	(Dominican Republic) Azua
Elvis Alvarado	31	RHP	February 23, 1999 (aged 27)	(United States) Athletics	Major League Baseball	(Dominican Republic) Sabaneta
Brayan Bello	66	RHP	May 17, 1999 (aged 26)	(United States) Boston Red Sox	Major League Baseball	(Dominican Republic) Samana
Huascar Brazobán	43	RHP	October 15, 1989 (aged 36)	(United States) New York Mets	Major League Baseball	(Dominican Republic) Villa Mella
Junior Caminero	13	IF	July 5, 2003 (aged 22)	(United States) Tampa Bay Rays	Major League Baseball	(Dominican Republic) Santo Domingo
Oneil Cruz	15	OF	October 4, 1998 (aged 27)	(United States) Pittsburgh Pirates	Major League Baseball	(Dominican Republic) Nizao
Camilo Doval	75	RHP	July 4, 1997 (aged 28)	(United States) New York Yankees	Major League Baseball	(Dominican Republic) Yamasá
Seranthony Domínguez	44	RHP	November 25, 1994 (aged 31)	(United States) Chicago White Sox	Major League Baseball	(Dominican Republic) Esperanza
Carlos Estévez	53	RHP	December 28, 1992 (aged 33)	(United States) Kansas City Royals	Major League Baseball	(Dominican Republic) Santo Domingo
Vladimir Guerrero Jr.	27	IF	March 16, 1999 (aged 26)	(Canada) Toronto Blue Jays	Major League Baseball	(Canada) Montreal, Quebec
Erik González	11	IF	August 31, 1991 (aged 34)	(Mexico) Leones de Yucatán	Mexican League	(Dominican Republic) Puerto Plata
Junior Lake	82	OF	March 27, 1990 (aged 35)	(Mexico) Toros de Tijuana	Mexican League	(Dominican Republic) San Pedro de Macorís
Manny Machado (C)	3	IF	July 6, 1992 (aged 33)	(United States) San Diego Padres	Major League Baseball	(United States) Miami, Florida
Ketel Marte	4	IF	October 12, 1993 (aged 32)	(United States) Arizona Diamondbacks	Major League Baseball	(Dominican Republic) Nizao
Juan Mejía	47	RHP	July 4, 2000 (aged 25)	(United States) Colorado Rockies	Major League Baseball	(Dominican Republic) Santo Domingo
Geraldo Perdomo	2	IF	October 22, 1999 (aged 26)	(United States) Arizona Diamondbacks	Major League Baseball	(Dominican Republic) Santo Domingo
Wandy Peralta	59	LHP	July 27, 1991 (aged 34)	(United States) San Diego Padres	Major League Baseball	(Dominican Republic) San Francisco de Macorís
Agustín Ramírez	50	C	September 10, 2001 (aged 24)	(United States) Miami Marlins	Major League Baseball	(Dominican Republic) Santo Domingo
Amed Rosario	14	IF	November 20, 1995 (aged 30)	(United States) New York Yankees	Major League Baseball	(Dominican Republic) Santo Domingo
Julio Rodríguez	44	OF	December 29, 2000 (aged 25)	(United States) Seattle Mariners	Major League Baseball	(Dominican Republic) Loma de Cabrera
Cristopher Sánchez	61	LHP	December 12, 1996 (aged 29)	(United States) Philadelphia Phillies	Major League Baseball	(Dominican Republic) La Romana
Dennis Santana	60	RHP	April 12, 1996 (aged 29)	(United States) Pittsburgh Pirates	Major League Baseball	(Dominican Republic) San Pedro de Macorís
Carlos Santana	41	IF	April 8, 1986 (aged 39)	(United States) Arizona Diamondbacks	Major League Baseball	(Dominican Republic) Santo Domingo
Luis Severino	40	RHP	February 20, 1994 (aged 32)	(United States) Athletics	Major League Baseball	(Dominican Republic) Sabana de la Mar
Gregory Soto	65	LHP	February 11, 1995 (aged 31)	(United States) Pittsburgh Pirates	Major League Baseball	(Dominican Republic) Haina
Juan Soto	22	OF	October 25, 1998 (aged 27)	(United States) New York Mets	Major League Baseball	(Dominican Republic) Santo Domingo
Fernando Tatís Jr.	23	OF	January 2, 1999 (aged 27)	(United States) San Diego Padres	Major League Baseball	(Dominican Republic) San Pedro de Macorís
Abner Uribe	45	RHP	June 20, 2000 (aged 25)	(United States) Milwaukee Brewers	Major League Baseball	(Dominican Republic) Santo Domingo
Austin Wells	28	C	July 12, 1999 (aged 26)	(United States) New York Yankees	Major League Baseball	(United States) Scottsdale, Arizona

Designated Pitcher Pool: Luis Castillo, Yerry De Los Santos, Yaramil Hiraldo, Joel Peguero and Yohan Ramírez

=== Netherlands ===
Jakey Josepha replaced Jurickson Profar, who tested positive for a performance-enhancing substance prior to the competition.

Manager: (Curaçao) Andruw Jones

Coaches: Sharnol Adriana, Michael Duursma, Bart Hanegraaff, Evert-Jan 't Hoen, Jair Jurrjens, Sem Kuijper, Randolph Oduber, Dashenko Ricardo, Hainley Statia, Nick Stuifbergen, Ben Thijssen

Player	No.	Pos.	Date of birth (age)	Team	League	Birthplace
Ozzie Albies	1	IF	January 7, 1997 (aged 29)	(United States) Atlanta Braves	Major League Baseball	Willemstad, Curaçao
Xander Bogaerts (C)	2	IF	October 1, 1992 (aged 33)	(United States) San Diego Padres	Major League Baseball	San Nicolaas, Aruba
Hendrik Clementina	12	C	June 17, 1997 (aged 28)	(Mexico) Algodoneros de Unión Laguna	Mexican League	Willemstad, Curaçao
Jamdrick Cornelia	30	LHP	November 17, 2005 (aged 20)	(United States) New York Mets (minors)	Minor League Baseball	Willemstad, Curaçao
Dayson Croes	5	OF	October 8, 1999 (aged 26)	(United States) San Francisco Giants (minors)	Minor League Baseball	Noord, Aruba
Ray-Patrick Didder	11	OF	October 1, 1994 (aged 31)	(Canada) Winnipeg Goldeyes	American Association	Oranjestad, Aruba
Jaydenn Estanista	32	RHP	October 3, 2001 (aged 24)	(United States) Philadelphia Phillies (minors)	Minor League Baseball	Willemstad, Curaçao
Wendell Floranus	99	RHP	April 16, 1995 (aged 30)	(Canada) Aigles de Trois-Rivières	Frontier League	Willemstad, Curaçao
Arij Fransen	17	RHP	May 20, 2001 (aged 24)	(Canada) Winnipeg Goldeyes	American Association	(Netherlands) Deventer
Didi Gregorius	18	IF	February 18, 1990 (aged 36)	(Mexico) Algodoneros de Unión Laguna	Mexican League	(Netherlands) Amsterdam
Lars Huijer	16	RHP	September 22, 1993 (aged 32)	(Netherlands) Amsterdam Pirates	Honkbal Hoofdklasse	(Netherlands) Haarlem
Kenley Jansen	74	RHP	September 30, 1987 (aged 38)	(United States) Detroit Tigers	Major League Baseball	Willemstad, Curaçao
Druw Jones	4	OF	November 28, 2003 (aged 22)	(United States) Arizona Diamondbacks (minors)	Minor League Baseball	(United States) Atlanta, Georgia
Jakey Josepha	37	OF	May 15, 2004 (aged 21)	(United States) Arizona Diamondbacks (minors)	Minor League Baseball	Willemstad, Curaçao
Antwone Kelly	58	RHP	September 1, 2003 (aged 22)	(United States) Pittsburgh Pirates (minors)	Minor League Baseball	Oranjestad, Aruba
Jaitoine Kelly	34	RHP	June 29, 2007 (aged 18)	(United States) Arizona Diamondbacks (minors)	Minor League Baseball	Paradera, Aruba
Kevin Kelly	33	RHP	May 27, 1990 (aged 35)	(Nicaragua) Indios del Bóer	Nicaraguan League	Willemstad, Curaçao
Shairon Martis	39	RHP	March 30, 1987 (aged 38)	(Netherlands) Neptunus	Honkbal Hoofdklasse	Willemstad, Curaçao
Eric Mendez	29	RHP	December 3, 1999 (aged 26)	San Marino Baseball Club	Serie A1	Savaneta, Aruba
Ryjeteri Merite	52	LHP	December 16, 2005 (aged 20)	(United States) Cincinnati Reds (minors)	Minor League Baseball	(Netherlands) Rotterdam
Justin Morales	46	RHP	December 14, 2004 (aged 21)	(United States) Bethune–Cookman Wildcats	NCAA Div. I (SWAC)	Oranjestad, Aruba
Shawndrick Oduber	35	RHP	December 16, 2004 (aged 21)	(United States) Los Angeles Dodgers (minors)	Minor League Baseball	Savaneta, Aruba
Juremi Profar	13	IF	January 30, 1996 (aged 30)	(Pakistan) Karachi Monarchs	Baseball United	Willemstad, Curaçao
Ceddanne Rafaela	3	OF	September 18, 2000 (aged 25)	(United States) Boston Red Sox	Major League Baseball	Willemstad, Curaçao
Sharlon Schoop	15	IF	April 15, 1987 (aged 38)	(Curaçao) Santa Maria Pirates	AA League	Willemstad, Curaçao
Delano Selassa	22	OF	October 25, 1999 (aged 26)	(Netherlands) Amsterdam Pirates	Honkbal Hoofdklasse	(Netherlands) Hilversum
J. C. Sulbaran	45	RHP	November 9, 1989 (aged 36)	(Netherlands) Neptunus	Honkbal Hoofdklasse	Willemstad, Curaçao
Chadwick Tromp	14	C	March 21, 1995 (aged 30)	(United States) Atlanta Braves (minors)	Minor League Baseball	Oranjestad, Aruba
Derek West	00	RHP	December 2, 1996 (aged 29)	Free agent		(United States) Orange City, Florida
Dylan Wilson	20	RHP	December 1, 2005 (aged 20)	(United States) Seattle Mariners (minors)	Minor League Baseball	Willemstad, Curaçao

Designated Pitcher Pool: Brandon Herbold, Ryan Huntington, Koen Postelmans, Connor Prins, Scott Prins and Michael Vilchez

=== Israel ===
Manager: (United States) Brad Ausmus

Coaches: Jason Bell, Nate Fish, Blake Gailen, Brad Goldberg, Mark Loretta, Jason Marquis, Jerry Narron, Tyger Pederson, Kevin Youkilis

Player	No.	Pos.	Date of birth (age)	Team	League	Birthplace
Harrison Bader	2	OF	June 3, 1994 (aged 31)	(United States) San Francisco Giants	Major League Baseball	(United States) Bronxville, New York
Charlie Beilenson	5	RHP	December 10, 1999 (aged 26)	(United States) Seattle Mariners (minors)	Minor League Baseball	(United States) Los Angeles, California
Matt Bowman	66	RHP	May 31, 1991 (aged 34)	(United States) Minnesota Twins (minors)	Minor League Baseball	(United States) Chevy Chase, Maryland
Cole Carrigg	8	IF	May 8, 2002 (aged 23)	(United States) Colorado Rockies (minors)	Minor League Baseball	(United States) Modesto, California
Harrison Cohen	18	RHP	May 28, 1999 (aged 26)	(United States) New York Yankees (minors)	Minor League Baseball	(United States) New Hyde Park, New York
Daniel Federman	99	RHP	September 18, 1998 (aged 27)	Free agent		(United States) Pembroke Pines, Florida
Jake Fishman	17	LHP	February 8, 1995 (aged 31)	(Mexico) Toros de Tijuana	Mexican League	(United States) Newton, Massachusetts
Jordan Geber	33	RHP	July 31, 1999 (aged 26)	(United States) New York Mets (minors)	Minor League Baseball	(United States) Annapolis, Maryland
Jake Gelof	45	IF	February 25, 2002 (aged 24)	(United States) Los Angeles Dodgers (minors)	Minor League Baseball	(United States) Rehoboth Beach, Delaware
Colby Halter	7	OF	August 24, 2001 (aged 24)	(United States) Athletics (minors)	Minor League Baseball	(United States) Jacksonville, Florida
Spencer Horwitz	13	IF	November 14, 1997 (aged 28)	(United States) Pittsburgh Pirates	Major League Baseball	(United States) Timonium, Maryland
Tanner Jacobson	39	RHP	January 24, 2000 (aged 26)	Free agent		(United States) Pittsburgh, Pennsylvania
Tommy Kahnle	43	RHP	August 7, 1989 (aged 36)	Free agent		(United States) Latham, New York
Rob Kaminsky	75	LHP	September 2, 1994 (aged 31)	(United States) Staten Island FerryHawks	Atlantic League	(United States) Englewood Cliffs, New Jersey
Dean Kremer	64	RHP	January 7, 1996 (aged 30)	(United States) Baltimore Orioles	Major League Baseball	(United States) Stockton, California
Max Lazar	60	RHP	June 3, 1999 (aged 26)	(United States) Philadelphia Phillies	Major League Baseball	(United States) Coral Springs, Florida
Zack Leban	53	RHP	May 30, 1996 (aged 29)	Free agent		(United States) Bellevue, Washington
Carlos Lequerica	40	RHP	September 6, 2000 (aged 25)	Free agent		(United States) Miami, Florida
Zach Levenson	10	OF	March 6, 2002 (aged 23)	(United States) St. Louis Cardinals (minors)	Minor League Baseball	(United States) Orlando, Florida
Assaf Lowengart	24	OF	March 1, 1998 (aged 28)	Free agent		Timorim, Israel
Josh Mallitz	58	RHP	October 20, 2001 (aged 24)	(United States) San Diego Padres (minors)	Minor League Baseball	(United States) Boca Raton, Florida
Noah Mendlinger	3	IF	August 9, 2000 (aged 25)	(United States) St. Louis Cardinals (minors)	Minor League Baseball	(United States) Atlanta, Georgia
Matt Mervis	52	IF	April 16, 1998 (aged 27)	(United States) Washington Nationals (minors)	Minor League Baseball	(United States) Washington, D.C.
Ryan Prager	12	LHP	October 26, 2002 (aged 23)	(United States) Cleveland Guardians (minors)	Minor League Baseball	(United States) Dallas, Texas
Benjamin Rosengard	22	IF	January 18, 2000 (aged 26)	(United States) Idaho Falls Chukars	Pioneer League	(United States) Chicago, Illinois
RJ Schreck	0	OF	July 12, 2000 (aged 25)	(Canada) Toronto Blue Jays (minors)	Minor League Baseball	(United States) Los Angeles, California
Ben Simon	15	RHP	March 12, 2002 (aged 23)	(United States) New York Mets (minors)	Minor League Baseball	(United States) Princeton, New Jersey
C. J. Stubbs	36	C	November 12, 1996 (aged 29)	(Canada) Toronto Blue Jays (minors)	Minor League Baseball	(United States) San Diego, California
Garrett Stubbs	21	C	May 26, 1993 (aged 32)	(United States) Philadelphia Phillies	Major League Baseball	(United States) San Diego, California
Zack Weiss	48	RHP	June 16, 1992 (aged 33)	Free agent		(United States) Irvine, California

=== Nicaragua ===
Manager: Dusty Baker

Coaches: Jorge Avellán, Rodolfo Bone, Dan Firova, Sandor Guido, Jacque Jones, Gary Pettis, Len Picota, Randall Simon, José Torrez, Aníbal Vega

Player	No.	Pos.	Date of birth (age)	Team	League	Birthplace
Benjamin Alegria	1	IF	August 6, 1997 (aged 28)	(Nicaragua) Leones de León	Nicaraguan League	(Nicaragua) Managua
Danilo Bermúdez	42	LHP	March 22, 1999 (aged 26)	(Nicaragua) Gigantes de Rivas	Nicaraguan League	(Nicaragua) Rivas
Kenword Burton	10	RHP	August 4, 1998 (aged 27)	(Nicaragua) Indios del Bóer	Nicaraguan League	(Nicaragua) Bluefields
Stiven Cruz	14	RHP	November 14, 2001 (aged 24)	(United States) Milwaukee Brewers (minors)	Minor League Baseball	(Nicaragua) Managua
Cheslor Cuthbert	24	3B	November 16, 1992 (aged 33)	(Nicaragua) Gigantes de Rivas	Nicaraguan League	(Nicaragua) Corn Islands
Chase Dawson	15	OF	June 12, 1997 (aged 28)	(United States) Schaumburg Boomers	Frontier League	(United States) Chesterton, Indiana
Jeter Downs	4	IF	July 27, 1998 (aged 27)	(Japan) Fukuoka SoftBank Hawks	Nippon Professional Baseball	San Andrés, Colombia
Osman Gutierrez	41	RHP	December 15, 1994 (aged 31)	(Nicaragua) Gigantes de Rivas	Nicaraguan League	(Nicaragua) León
Duque Hebbert	62	RHP	October 29, 2001 (aged 24)	(United States) Detroit Tigers (minors)	Minor League Baseball	(Nicaragua) Puerto Cabezas
Brandon Leyton	5	IF	December 17, 1998 (aged 27)	(Nicaragua) Leones de León	Nicaraguan League	(Nicaragua) León
Ronald Medrano	36	RHP	September 17, 1995 (aged 30)	(Mexico) Rieleros de Aguascalientes	Mexican League	(Nicaragua) Managua
Dilmer Mejía	32	LHP	July 9, 1997 (aged 28)	(Nicaragua) Leones de León	Nicaraguan League	(Nicaragua) El Sauce
Omar Mendoza	45	OF	October 30, 1997 (aged 28)	(Nicaragua) Tigres de Chinandega	Nicaraguan League	(Nicaragua) Managua
Juan Montes	99	OF	May 15, 1995 (aged 30)	(Nicaragua) Tren del Norte	Nicaraguan League	Guatemala City, Guatemala
Ismael Munguia	18	OF	October 19, 1998 (aged 27)	(Canada) Toronto Blue Jays (minors)	Minor League Baseball	(Nicaragua) Chinandega
Melvin Novoa	75	C	June 17, 1996 (aged 29)	(Nicaragua) Indios del Bóer	Nicaraguan League	(Nicaragua) Nandaime
Ángel Obando	2	RHP	January 19, 1999 (aged 27)	(Nicaragua) Gigantes de Rivas	Nicaraguan League	(Nicaragua) Managua
Jose Saul Orozco	20	IF	March 6, 1999 (aged 26)	(Nicaragua) Leones de León	Nicaraguan League	(Nicaragua) Matagalpa
Erasmo Ramírez (C)	30	RHP	May 2, 1990 (aged 35)	Free agent		(Nicaragua) Rivas
J. C. Ramírez	66	RHP	August 16, 1988 (aged 37)	(United States) York Revolution	Atlantic League of Professional Baseball	(Nicaragua) Managua
Elian Rayo	31	IF	March 4, 2003 (aged 23)	(United States) San Francisco Giants (minors)	Minor League Baseball	(Nicaragua) Ciudad Darío
Oscar Rayo	90	LHP	January 3, 2002 (aged 24)	(United States) Kansas City Royals (minors)	Minor League Baseball	(Nicaragua) Managua
Ronald Rivera	25	C	November 28, 1993 (aged 32)	(Nicaragua) Gigantes de Rivas	Nicaraguan League	(Nicaragua) Chinandega
Carlos Rodríguez	27	RHP	November 27, 2001 (aged 24)	(United States) Milwaukee Brewers	Major League Baseball	(Nicaragua) Rivas
Christhian Sandoval	95	OF	May 9, 2000 (aged 25)	(Nicaragua) Gigantes de Rivas	Nicaraguan League	(Nicaragua) Juigalpa
Carlos Teller	37	LHP	October 3, 1986 (aged 39)	(Nicaragua) Tren del Norte	Nicaraguan League	(Nicaragua) Managua
Bryan Torres	78	RHP	April 12, 2001 (aged 24)	(Nicaragua) Leones de León	Nicaraguan League	(Nicaragua) León
Emanuel Trujillo	9	IF	October 19, 2001 (aged 24)	(Nicaragua) Tigres de Chinandega	Nicaraguan League	(Nicaragua) Chinandega
Mark Vientos	13	3B	December 11, 1999 (aged 26)	(United States) New York Mets	Major League Baseball	(United States) Norwalk, Connecticut
Freddy Zamora	23	SS	November 1, 1998 (aged 27)	(United States) Milwaukee Brewers (minors)	Minor League Baseball	(Nicaragua) Managua

Designated Pitcher Pool: Leo Crawford, Stanling Orozco, Rodney Theophile and Pedro Torres

== Statistics ==
=== Age ===
- Oldest: (Cuba) Alexei Ramírez (44 years, 164 days)
- Youngest: (Brazil) Joseph Contreras (17 years, 303 days)

==== Position players ====
- Oldest: (Cuba) Alexei Ramírez (44 years, 164 days)
- Youngest: (Czech Republic) Max Prejda (18 years, 272 days)

==== Pitchers ====
- Oldest: (South Korea) Noh Kyung-eun (41 years, 359 days)
- Youngest: (Brazil) Joseph Contreras (17 years, 303 days)

==== Captains ====
- Oldest: (Cuba) Alfredo Despaigne (39 years, 261 days)
- Youngest: (United Kingdom) Harry Ford (23 years, 12 days)

=== Player representation by league ===
League	Players	Percent
Major League Baseball	179	29.83%
Minor League Baseball	122	20.33%
Mexican Baseball League	45	7.50%
Free agent	43	7.17%
Nippon Professional Baseball	35	5.83%
KBO League	28	4.67%
Czech Baseball Extraliga	22	3.67%
Chinese Professional Baseball League	19	3.17%
Nicaraguan Professional Baseball League	19	3.17%
Australian Baseball League	16	2.67%
Campeonato Brasileiro de Beisebol	8	1.33%
Cuban National Series	8	1.33%
Atlantic League	8	1.33%
Colombian Professional Baseball League	6	1.33%
Serie A	6	1.00%
Honkbal Hoofdklasse	5	0.83%
NCAA	5	0.67%
KBO Futures League	4	0.67%
Western League	4	0.67%
NJCAA	4	0.67%
American Association	3	0.50%
Frontier League	3	0.50%
Japanese Industrial League	3	0.50%
Baseball United	2	0.33%
PROBEIS	2	0.33%
AA League	1	0.17%
Baseball Challenge League	1	0.17%
JUBF	1	0.17%
French Division 1	1	0.17%
Georgia Independent School Association	1	0.17%
Pioneer League	1	0.17%
Venezuelan Major League	1	0.17%

Preceded by 2023	World Baseball Classic rosters	Succeeded by TBD
