= Tirso Ornelas =

Mexican baseball player (born 2000)

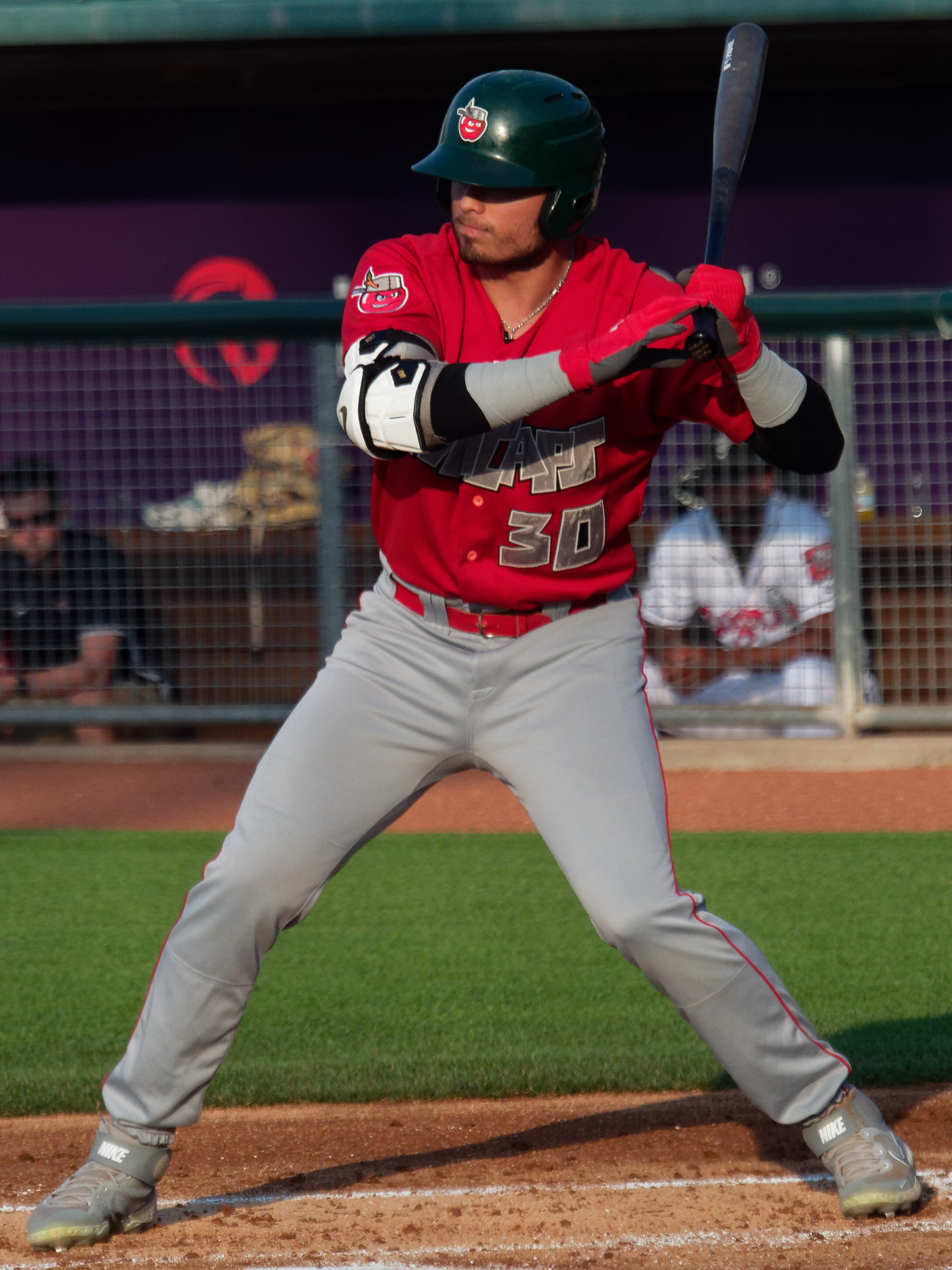
- Ornelas with the Fort Wayne TinCaps in 2021

Free agent
- Outfielder
- Born: March 11, 2000 (age 26); Tijuana, Mexico
- Bats: Left Throws: Right

MLB debut
- April 19, 2025, for the San Diego Padres

MLB statistics (through 2025 season)
- Batting average: .071
- Home runs: 0
- Runs batted in: 1
- Stats at Baseball Reference

Teams
- San Diego Padres (2025)

Tirso Abraham Ornelas (born March 11, 2000) is a Mexican professional baseball outfielder who is a free agent. He made his Major League Baseball (MLB) debut in 2025.

== Career ==
Ornelas signed with the San Diego Padres as an international free agent on March 31, 2017. He made his professional debut with the rookie-level Arizona League Padres. Ornelas spent the 2018 season with the Single-A Fort Wayne TinCaps, playing in 86 games and hitting .252/.341/.392 with eight home runs, 40 RBI, and five stolen bases.

Ornelas split the 2019 campaign between the AZL Padres and the High-A Lake Elsinore Storm, batting a combined .217/.303/.279 with one home run, 41 RBI, and seven stolen bases. He did not play in a game in 2020 due to the cancellation of the minor league season because of the COVID-19 pandemic. Ornelas returned to action in 2021 with Fort Wayne, posting a .248/.344/.389 batting line with seven home runs, 55 RBI, and three stolen bases over 107 appearances.

Ornelas spent the majority of the 2022 season with the Double-A San Antonio Missions, also receiving a three-game cup of coffee with the Triple-A El Paso Chihuahuas. In 115 total appearances for the two affiliates, he slashed a cumulative .286/.352/.404 with seven home runs, 53 RBI, and seven stolen bases. Ornelas played in 127 games for San Antonio and El Paso in 2023, batting .285/.371/.452 with 15 home runs, 75 RBI, and eight stolen bases.

On July 17, 2024, the Padres added Ornelas to their 40-man roster and optioned him to Triple–A El Paso. In 128 games for El Paso, he slashed .297/.367/.497 with career–highs in home runs (23) and RBI (89). Following the season, Ornelas was named San Diego's minor league player of the year.

Ornelas was optioned to Triple-A El Paso to begin the 2025 season. On April 19, 2025, Ornelas was promoted to the major leagues for the first time. On April 25, Ornelas recorded his first career hit, a single off of Tampa Bay Rays starter Shane Baz. He made seven appearances for San Diego during his rookie campaign, going 1-for-14 (.071) with one RBI.

On February 17, 2026, Ornelas was designated for assignment by the Padres; he cleared waivers and was sent outright to Triple-A El Paso on February 22. In 120 games with Double-A San Antonio Missions he batted .253/.327/.443 with 17 home runs, 54 RBIs and 2 stolen bases. He elected free agency on November 2.

== Personal life ==
His older brother is Julián Ornelas, who plays as an outfielder for the Diablos Rojos del México of the Mexican League. The two brothers have previously played together with the Charros de Jalisco of the Mexican Pacific League.
