= Julián Ornelas =

Mexican baseball player (born 1996)

Diablos Rojos del México – No. 31
- Outfielder
- Born: 28 December 1996 (age 29); Tijuana, Baja California, Mexico
- Bats: Left Throws: Right
Medals
Men's baseball
Representing Mexico
U-23 Baseball World Cup
Gold medal – first place	2018 Barranquilla	Team

Julián Rafael Ornelas Murray (born 28 December 1996) is a Mexican professional baseball outfielder for the Diablos Rojos del México of the Mexican League. Ornelas also plays for the Charros de Jalisco of the Mexican Pacific League.

== Early career ==
Ornelas was born in Tijuana, Baja California on 28 December 1996. In 2014, he joined the Alfredo Harp Helú Baseball Academy in San Bartolo Coyotepec, Oaxaca, which is owned by the Diablos Rojos del México of the Mexican League. In 2016, he suffered a lower back injury and underwent a rehabilitation process at the academy.

== Professional career ==
=== Diablos Rojos del México ===
On 3 June 2017, Ornelas signed with the Diablos Rojos del México of the Mexican League, under manager Miguel Ojeda. He appeared in 45 games, batting .295/.370/.375 with 16 RBI. That same year, Ornelas also made his debut in the Mexican Pacific League with the Charros de Jalisco, appearing in just one game.

=== Guerreros de Oaxaca ===
On 22 March 2018, Ornelas was traded to the Guerreros de Oaxaca. He finished the season with 46 hits, three home runs, and 25 RBI over 163 at bats in 58 games, posting a .283 batting average. In 2019, manager Sergio Omar Gastélum inserted Ornelas to the starting lineup. He appeared in 110 games hitting .287/.364/.524 with 21 home runs and 60 RBI.

=== Diablos Rojos del México (second stint) ===
On 31 January 2020, Ornelas and Jonathan Partida were traded to the Diablos Rojos del México in exchange for Fabian Cota, Fernando Miranda, Gonzalo Sanudo, Kevin Medrano, Oziel Flores, Rigoberto Terrazas, and Rogelio Martínez.

Ornelas finished the 2024 season as the league leader in runs batted in with 84, playing a key role in the team's 2024 championship victory, where the Diablos Rojos swept the Sultanes de Monterrey in four games. He also won the 2024–25 Mexican Pacific League title with the Charros.

Ornelas made 82 appearances for the Diablos during the 2025 season, slashing .339/.420/.581 with 19 home runs, 80 RBI, and 12 stolen bases. With the team, he won his second consecutive Serie del Rey.

== International career ==
In 2018, Ornelas was selected as part of the Mexican squad that competed in the 2018 U-23 Baseball World Cup held in Barranquilla, Colombia. Mexico won the gold medal, defeating Japan 2–1 in the final game. He appeared in eight games, recording seven hits, seven runs, two doubles, one triple and one RBI in 30 at bats, finishing with a .233 batting average.

In 2024, Ornelas was selected to represent Mexico at the 2024 WBSC Premier12. He appeared in four games, recording a .083/.214/.023 batting line.

In February 2026, Ornelas was announced as part of the team that will represent Mexico at the 2026 World Baseball Classic.

== Personal life ==
Ornelas' younger brother, Tirso, plays for the San Diego Padres of Major League Baseball. They have previously played together with the Charros de Jalisco of the Mexican Pacific League.
