= Randy Martínez =

Cuban baseball player (born 2003)

Chunichi Dragons
- Pitcher
- Born: September 28, 2003 (age 23); Pinar del Río, Cuba
- Bats: Left Throws: Left

Randy Martínez (born September 28, 2003) is a Cuban professional baseball pitcher in the organization of the Chunichi Dragons of Nippon Professional Baseball (NPB).

== Career ==
=== Vegueros de Pinar del Río ===
Martínez began his career in Cuba with the Vegueros de Pinar del Río. In 2024, Martínez played in 20 games for Vegueros, including 14 starts, and had a 6-2 record with a 3.87 ERA.

=== Chunichi Dragons ===
On December 5, 2024, Martínez signed a development contract with the Chunichi Dragons of Nippon Professional Baseball. He was assigned to the farm club. In 2025, Martínez pitched in 5 games on the farm, with a 3.86 ERA. He re-signed with the Dragons after the season.

== International career ==
Martínez was named to the Cuba national baseball team for the 2026 World Baseball Classic.
