= Kim Kwang-sam =

South Korean baseball player (born 1980)

Hanwha Eagles – No. 88
- Starting pitcher/Coach
- Born: August 15, 1980 (age 46)
- Bats: Left Throws: Right

KBO debut
- 1999, for the LG Twins

KBO statistics (through 2012 Season)
- Win–loss record: 41-49
- Earned run average: 5.20
- Strikeouts: 442
- Stats at Baseball Reference

Teams
- As player: LG Twins (1999–2016); As coach: LG Twins Development Team (2017–2019); LG Twins 2nd Team (2020, 2023); LG Twins (2021–2026); Hanwha Eagles (2027–present)

Kim Kwang-sam (Korean: 김광삼; Hanja: 金光三; born August 15, 1980 in Seoul) is a South Korean starting pitcher who plays for the LG Twins in the Korea Baseball Organization. He bats left-handed and throws right-handed.

== Amateur career ==
Kim attended Shinil High School. In 1997, he was selected for the South Korean junior national team and competed in the World Junior Baseball Championship held in Moncton, Canada.

=== Notable international careers ===
Year	Venue	Competition	Team
1997	Canada	World Junior Baseball Championship	5th
1998	Japan	Asian Junior Baseball Championship	Bronze medal

== Professional career ==
=== Notable international careers ===
Year	Venue	Competition	Team
2002	Cuba	Intercontinental Cup	Silver medal
