= Malcom Núñez =

Free agent
- First baseman / Third baseman
- Born: March 9, 2001 (age 25); Havana, Cuba
- Bats: Right Throws: Right
Medals
Men's baseball
Representing Cuba
U-15 Baseball World Cup
Gold medal – first place	2016 Iwaki	Team

Malcom Yaniel Núñez (born March 9, 2001) is a Cuban professional baseball first baseman and third baseman who is a free agent.

Núñez signed with the St. Louis Cardinals as an international free agent in July 2018. He made his professional debut that year with the Dominican Summer League Cardinals. He played 2019 with the Johnson City Cardinals and Peoria Chiefs.

Núñez did not play for a team in 2020, due to the Minor League Baseball season being cancelled because of the COVID-19 pandemic. He returned in 2021 to play for Peoria and Springfield Cardinals and started 2022 with Springfield.

On August 1, 2022, Núñez and Johan Oviedo were traded to the Pittsburgh Pirates for José Quintana and Chris Stratton. He was assigned to the Altoona Curve. He elected free agency on November 6, 2025.
