= Joseph Contreras =

American baseball player (born 2008)

Blessed Trinity Catholic High School
- Pitcher
- Born: May 6, 2008 (age 18); Alpharetta, Georgia, U.S.
- Bats: Switch Throws: Right

Joseph Contreras (born May 6, 2008) is an American baseball pitcher. Contreras played for Brazil in the 2026 World Baseball Classic, where he was the youngest player in the tournament.

== Career ==
Contreras's parents are José Contreras, a Cuban pitcher who in 2008 was pitching for the Chicago White Sox, and Isabel, a woman of Brazilian ancestry who was born in Houston. He was raised in Roswell, Georgia and pitched at Blessed Trinity Catholic School. He is committed to playing college baseball at Vanderbilt University and was eligible for the 2026 Major League Baseball draft.

At 17 years of age, Contreras was named to the Brazil national baseball team for the 2026 World Baseball Classic (WBC). He was the youngest player on any roster at the WBC. At the time, he was ranked number 34 on Baseball America's list of top prospects for the 2026 MLB Draft. In his international debut, Contreras pitched 1 1/3 innings against the United States, and induced an inning-ending double play by Aaron Judge.

Contreras was not selected in the 2026 MLB Draft. He committed to attend Vanderbilt University and will play for the Commodores.

== Pitching style ==
Contreras is 6 feet 4 inches (1.93 m) tall and weighs 195 pounds (88 kg). He has a four-seam fastball which peaks at 98 miles per hour (158 km/h); Major League Baseball (MLB) scouts have suggested that his best pitch is a forkball.
