= Josimar Cousín =

Cuban baseball player (born 1998)

Charleston Dirty Birds – No. 31
- Pitcher
- Born: February 18, 1998 (age 28); Camagüey, Cuba
- Bats: Right Throws: Right

Josimar Isaac Cousín (born February 18, 1998) is a Cuban professional baseball pitcher for the Charleston Dirty Birds of the Atlantic League of Professional Baseball.

== Career ==
=== Chicago White Sox ===
On May 25, 2023, Cousín signed a minor league contract with the Chicago White Sox for a $100,000 signing bonus. He spent his first affiliated season split between the rookie–level Arizona Complex League White Sox, High–A Winston-Salem Dash, and Double–A Birmingham Barons. In 15 starts between the three teams, Cousín accumulated a 5.56 ERA with 47 strikeouts across 55 innings of work.

On December 20, 2023, the White Sox selected Cousín's contract and added him to their 40-man roster. He was optioned to the Triple–A Charlotte Knights to begin the 2024 season. On April 16, 2024, Cousín was designated for assignment following the promotion of Jonathan Cannon. He cleared waivers and was sent outright to Double–A Birmingham on April 20. In 30 appearances split between Charlotte and Birmingham, Cousín recorded a combined 2.80 ERA with 34 strikeouts and 35 1/3 innings pitched. He elected free agency following the season on November 4.

=== Bravos de León ===
On March 3, 2025, Cousin signed with the Bravos de León of the Mexican League. In nine starts for León, Cousín struggled to a 2–4 record and 8.74 ERA with 21 strikeouts across 34 innings of work. He was released on June 8.

=== Rieleros de Aguascalientes ===
On June 10, 2025, Cousín signed with the Rieleros de Aguascalientes of the Mexican League. In eight appearances for Aguascalientes, he posted a 2–2 record with a 6.11 ERA and 18 strikeouts across 28 innings pitched. On February 4, 2026, Cousin was released by the Rieleros.

=== Charleston Dirty Birds ===
On June 17, 2026, Cousín signed with the Charleston Dirty Birds of the Atlantic League of Professional Baseball.
