= Agustín Ramírez (baseball) =

Dominican baseball player (born 2001)

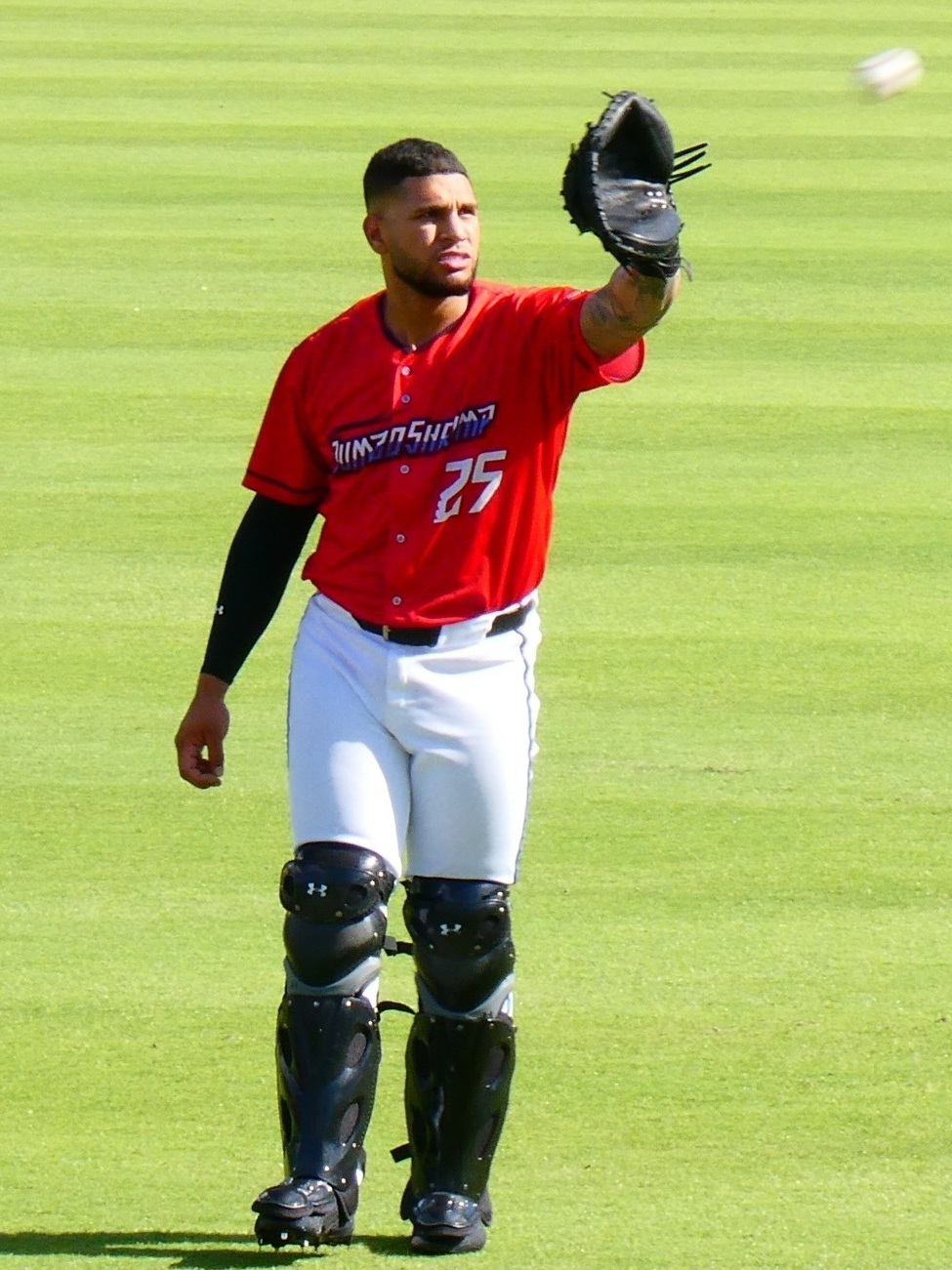
- Ramírez with the Jacksonville Jumbo Shrimp in 2025

Miami Marlins – No. 50
- Catcher
- Born: September 10, 2001 (age 25); Santo Domingo, Dominican Republic
- Bats: Right Throws: Right

MLB debut
- April 21, 2025, for the Miami Marlins

MLB statistics (through 2026 season)
- Batting average: .232
- Home runs: 26
- Runs batted in: 91
- Stats at Baseball Reference

Teams
- Miami Marlins (2025–present)
Medals
Men's baseball
Representing Dominican Republic
World Baseball Classic
Bronze medal – third place	2026 Miami	Team

Agustín Ramírez (born September 10, 2001) is a Dominican professional baseball catcher for the Miami Marlins of Major League Baseball (MLB). He made his MLB debut in 2025.

== Career ==
=== New York Yankees ===
Ramírez signed with the New York Yankees as an international free agent on July 12, 2018. He made his professional debut in 2019 with the Dominican Summer League Yankees. Ramírez did not play in a game 2020 due to the cancellation of the minor league season because of the COVID-19 pandemic. He played 2021 and 2022 with the rookie-level Florida Complex League Yankees.

Ramírez split the 2023 campaign between the Single-A Tampa Tarpons, High-A Hudson Valley Renegades, and Double-A Somerset Patriots. In 114 appearances for the three affiliates, he batted a combined .271/.364/.455 with 18 home runs, 69 RBI, and 12 stolen bases.

On November 14, 2023, the Yankees added Ramírez to their 40-man roster to protect him from the Rule 5 draft. He was optioned to Double-A Somerset to begin the 2024 season.

=== Miami Marlins ===
On July 27, 2024, the Yankeees traded Ramírez, Jared Serna, and Abrahan Ramírez to the Miami Marlins in exchange for Jazz Chisholm Jr. He spent the remainder of the season with the Triple-A Jacksonville Jumbo Shrimp, playing in 39 games and hitting .262/.358/.447 with five home runs, 24 RBI, and four stolen bases.

Ramírez was optioned to Triple-A Jacksonville to begin the 2025 season. On April 21, 2025, Ramírez was promoted to the major leagues for the first time. On April 25, he hit his first career home run, a two-run shot off of Casey Lawrence of the Seattle Mariners.
