= Cristián Rodríguez (baseball) =

Cuban baseball player (born 2002)

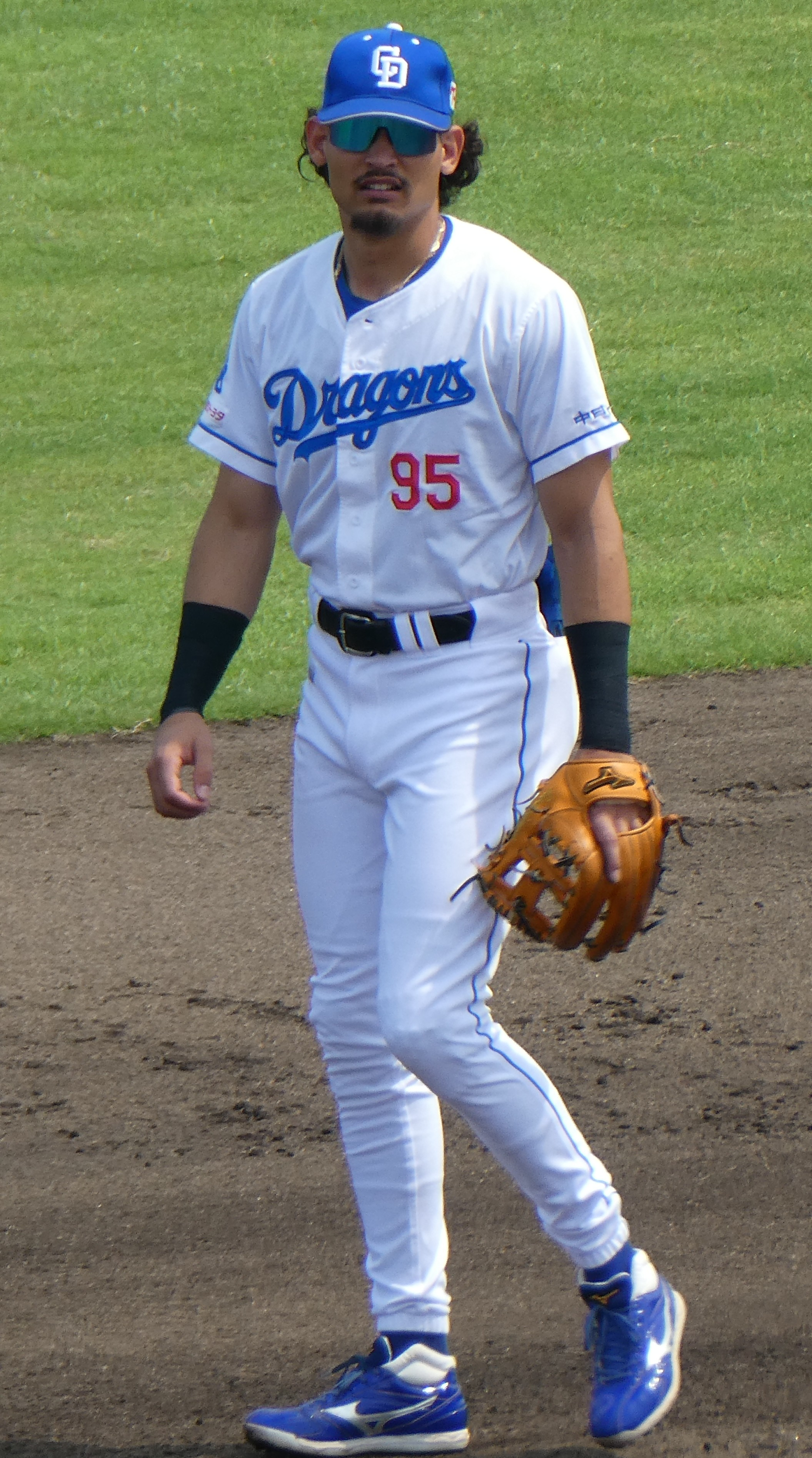

Chunichi Dragons – No. 95
- Infielder
- Born: 31 March 2002 (age 24); Villa Clara Province, Cuba
- Bats: Right Throws: Right

NPB debut
- 29 March, 2024, for the Chunichi Dragons

NPB statistics (through July 30, 2026)
- Batting average: .153
- Home runs: 0
- Runs batted in: 2
- Stats at Baseball Reference

Teams
- Chunichi Dragons (2024–present)

Cristián Leandro Rodríguez García (born 31 March 2002) is a Cuban professional baseball infielder for the Chunichi Dragons of Nippon Professional Baseball (NPB). He has previously played for Villa Clara in the Cuban National Series.

== Early career ==
Rodríguez was born on 31 March 2002 in Villa Clara Province. He debuted in the 2020–21 Cuban National Series with Villa Clara, finishing the season with a .133 batting average, two hits and two RBI in 23 games. The next season, Rodríguez appeared in 72 games, recording a .283 batting average, 58 hits, one home run and 27 RBI.

== Professional career ==
On 3 November 2023, Rodríguez was signed by the Chunichi Dragons of the Nippon Professional Baseball (NPB) as a development player. Kazuyoshi Tatsunami, manager of the Dragons, stated that Rodríguez "has good glove control and a strong shoulder".

He made his NPB debut with the Chunichi Dragons on 29 March 2024, in the 2024 NPB season opening day against the Tokyo Yakult Swallows in the Meiji Jingu Stadium, playing as shortstop and eight batter. Rodríguez appeared on 23 games during the 2024 season, recording a .130 batting average, seven hits and one RBI.

== International career ==
Rodríguez was selected to represent Cuba in the 2024 WBSC Premier12.
