= Ricardo Velez =

Puerto Rican baseball player (born 1998)

Free agent
- Pitcher
- Born: August 21, 1998 (age 28); Lajas, Puerto Rico
- Bats: Right Throws: Right

Ricardo Velez (born August 21, 1998) is a Puerto Rican professional baseball pitcher who is a free agent. Velez was named to the Puerto Rico national baseball team for the 2026 World Baseball Classic.

== Career ==
=== Minnesota Twins ===
On July 28, 2021, Velez signed with the Minnesota Twins after going unselected in the 2021 MLB draft out of the University of Science and Arts of Oklahoma. He made his professional debut for the rookie–level Florida Complex League Twins. Velez returned to the FCL Twins for the 2022 campaign, recording a 3.68 ERA with 12 strikeouts in 7 1/3 innings pitched across eight games.

Velez split the 2023 season between the FCL Twins, Single–A Fort Myers Mighty Mussels, and High–A Cedar Rapids Kernels. He made 27 appearances for the three affiliates, posting a cumulative 6–3 record and 2.95 ERA with 51 strikeouts and four saves across 39 2/3 innings pitched. Velez split 2024 between Cedar Rapids and the Double–A Wichita Wind Surge, accumulating an 8–4 record and 3.93 ERA with 68 strikeouts and seven saves over 55 innings of work.

On March 7, 2025, Velez was released by the Twins organization.

=== St. Louis Cardinals ===
On April 15, 2026, Velez signed a minor league contract with the St. Louis Cardinals. He made 33 appearances (including one start) split between the High–A Peoria Chiefs and Double–A Springfield Cardinals, accumulating a 7–1 record and 1.80 ERA with 55 strikeouts and two saves over 65 innings of work. Velez elected free agency following the season on November 6.

=== Texas Rangers ===
On January 20, 2026, Velez signed a minor league contract with the Texas Rangers. He made 17 appearances for the Double–A Frisco RoughRiders, compiling a 3–2 record and 5.18 ERA with 18 strikeouts and one save across 24 1/3 innings pitched. Velez was released by the Rangers organization on July 17.
