= Jared Serna =

Mexican baseball player (born 2002)

Miami Marlins – No. 68
- Infielder
- Born: June 1, 2002 (age 24); Guaymas, Mexico
- Bats: Right Throws: Right

MLB debut
- September 1, 2026, for the Miami Marlins

MLB statistics (through 2026 season)
- Batting average: .214
- Home runs: 0
- Runs batted in: 4
- Stats at Baseball Reference

Teams
- Miami Marlins (2026–present)

Jared Enrique Serna (born June 1, 2002) is a Mexican professional baseball infielder for the Miami Marlins of Major League Baseball (MLB).

== Career ==
=== New York Yankees ===
Serna signed with the New York Yankees as an international free agent on July 2, 2019. He did not play in a game 2020 due to the cancellation of the minor league season because of the COVID-19 pandemic. Serna made his professional debut in 2021 with the Dominican Summer League Yankees.

=== Miami Marlins ===
On July 27, 2024, the Yankeees traded Serna, Agustín Ramírez, and Abrahan Ramírez to the Miami Marlins in exchange for Jazz Chisholm Jr. In 39 games for the Double-A Pensacola Blue Wahoos, he slashed .266/.343/.390 with two home runs, 23 RBI, and three stolen bases. Serna also appeared in six games for the Triple-A Jacksonville Jumbo Shrimp, going 2-for-20 (.100) with one RBI and one stolen base. Following the season, the Marlins added Serna to their 40-man roster to protect him from the Rule 5 draft.

Serna was optioned to Double-A Pensacola to begin the 2025 season. In 102 appearances for Pensacola, he slashed .223/.305/.277 with three home runs, 28 RBI, and 15 stolen bases; Serna also made 10 late-season appearances for the Triple-A Jacksonville Jumbo Shrimp.

Serna was optioned to Triple-A Jacksonville to begin the 2026 season. In 91 appearances for the Jumbo Shrimp, he slashed .221/.303/.378 with 12 home runs, 48 RBI, and 14 stolen bases. On August 31, 2026, Serna was promoted to the major leagues for the first time.
