= Carlos Guzmán (baseball) =

New York Mets
- Pitcher
- Born: May 16, 1998 (age 28); Maracay, Venezuela
- Bats: Right Throws: Right
Medals
Men's baseball
Representing Venezuela
World Baseball Classic
Gold medal – first place	2026 Miami	Team

Carlos Alberto Guzmán (born May 16, 1998) is a Venezuelan professional baseball pitcher in the New York Mets organization.

Guzmán was signed by the Detroit Tigers as an international free agent in 2015; initially a third baseman, he converted to pitching during the 2017 season. Guzmán reached Double-A Erie in 2022 but spent most of the season with the High-A West Michigan Whitecaps, posting a 4.11 earned run average over 27 games that year. On March 27, 2023, the Tigers traded Guzmán to the Chicago Cubs in exchange for Zach McKinstry. He reached Triple-A Iowa Cubs, but spent most of the 2023 minor league season with the Double-A Tennessee Smokies. At the end of the season, Guzmán elected free agency. He was signed by the Mets on a minor league contract in 2023.

In the Venezuelan Winter League, Guzmán has played with the Tigres de Aragua. In the 2025–26 LVBP season, he posted an ERA of 0.73, the result of only two earned runs allowed in 24.2 innings; he issued just three walks in the regular season and notched 26 strikeouts.

Guzmán was named to the Venezuela national baseball team for the 2026 World Baseball Classic, one of the few players with no major league experience. He made his first appearance with the team in an exhibition game against the Washington Nationals. In his only appearance in the tournament (which Venezuela won for its first WBC title), Guzmán pitched a scoreless 0.2 innings in Venezuela's 4-0 win over Nicaragua. He was inducted into the Venezuelan Baseball Hall of Fame as a member of the 2026 WBC championship team.
