= Texas State Highway 77 =

State highway in Texas

State Highway 77
- SH 77 highlighted in red

Route information
- Maintained by TxDOT
- Length: 46.815 mi (75.341 km)
- Existed: 1923–present

Major junctions
- West end: US 259 near Omaha
- US 67 at Naples; US 59 at Atlanta
- East end: LA 1 at the Louisiana state line near Rodessa, LA

Location
- Country: United States
- State: Texas
- Counties: Morris and Cass

Highway system
- Highways in Texas; Interstate; US; State; Former; Toll; Loops; Spurs; FM/RM; Park; Rec
← US 77	→ SH 78

State Highway 77 (SH 77) is a numbered state highway in Texas, occupying the counties of Morris and Cass. SH 77 is 46.815 miles (75.341 km) long, and connects U.S. Highway 259 (US 259) to the Louisiana state line.

== Route description ==
SH 77 begins 4 miles (6.4 km) north of Omaha on US 259, and travels eastward to Naples, meeting US 67 and SH 338. In Douglassville, SH 77 intersects SH 8. After cutting across the south side of Atlanta, where it meets US 59, SH 77 cuts to the southeast, and crosses into the very northwest corner of Louisiana near Three Corners (where Arkansas, Louisiana and Texas meet), becoming Louisiana Highway 1.

== History ==
SH 77 was originally proposed on August 21, 1923, as a route from Douglasville to Naples, replacing SH 1B. On June 24, 1931, SH 77 was extended southeast to Louisiana, replacing a portion of SH 47. On August 4, 1932, SH 77 was extended to SH 11 (now US 259). On March 11, 1935, SH 77 Spur was designated to Marietta. This would be cancelled on completion, but would be restored on April 19, 1937, as SH 245. On July 15, 1935, the section of SH 77 west of Naples was cancelled. On September 26, 1939, SH 77 was extended west to Commerce, replacing SH 260, but this plan was cancelled on January 14, 1941. On February 28, 1966, SH 77 was extended west over FM 2880 from US 259 to US 67.

== Junction list ==
County	Location	mi	km	Destinations	Notes
Morris		0.0	0.0	US 259 – De Kalb, Daingerfield	
Morris	Naples	4.5	7.2	US 67 – Naples, Texarkana	Interchange
Morris	Naples	5.0	8.0	SH 338 south – Daingerfield	
Cass		6.5	10.5	FM 2888 south – Cornett	
Cass		9.6	15.4	FM 1766 east – Bryans Mill	
Cass		12.7	20.4	FM 250 south – Marietta, Hughes Springs	
Cass		16.0	25.7	FM 994 north – Bryans Mill	
Cass		18.2	29.3	FM 2065 north – Union Chapel	
Cass	Douglassville	23.7	38.1	SH 8 – New Boston, Linden	
Cass		27.7	44.6	FM 2791 east – Antioch, Atlanta State Park	
Cass		30.5	49.1	FM 96 north – Antioch, Atlanta State Park	
Cass		32.2	51.8	FM 2328 south – Lans Chapel	
Cass	Atlanta	35.0	56.3	FM 995 west – O'Farrell, Red Hill	
Cass	Atlanta	35.3	56.8	US 59 south – Linden	West end of US 59 overlap
Cass	Atlanta	35.7	57.5	US 59 north / FM 249 east – Texarkana, Downtown Atlanta	East end of US 59 overlap
Cass	Atlanta	36.3	58.4	SH 43 – Bivins	
Cass	Atlanta	37.0	59.5	FM 251	
Cass	Atlanta	37.6	60.5	FM 1841 – Business District, Huffins	
Cass		41.0	66.0	FM 1635 north	
Cass		44.7	71.9	FM 3129 north – Bloomburg, Domino	
Cass		47.1	75.8	LA 1 south – Shreveport	
1.000 mi = 1.609 km; 1.000 km = 0.621 mi: Concurrency terminus
