= Cusseta, Texas =

- Unincorporated community
- Location within Texas Location within the United States
- Coordinates: 33°09′44″N 94°27′27″W
- Country: United States
- State: Texas
- County: Cass
- Elevation: 482 ft (147 m)
- Time zone: UTC-6 (Central (CST))
  - Summer (DST): UTC-5 (CDT)
- Area codes: 903 & 430
- GNIS feature ID: 1378195

Cusseta is an unincorporated community in Cass County, Texas, United States. According to the Handbook of Texas, the community had a population of 30 in 2000.

== History ==
The area in what is known as Cusseta today was settled in the early 1850s and was named after Cusseta, Alabama, after John Robin Heard relocated from there. A post office was established in 1856. It most likely served as a shipping point for local plantation owners. The community had 100 residents served by a gristmill and two gins in 1884. The population was reduced by half in 1896 then returned to 100 in 1914. Cusseta had two businesses in 1933, but the population once again was reduced to 60. From 1990 through 2000, the population was 30 with no businesses.

On November 4, 2022, an EF2 tornado struck Cusseta. Countless large trees were snapped and twisted in this area, while a structure was damaged to a lesser degree. When the tornado weakened, additional tree damage was done before dissipating over State Highway 77.

== Geography ==
Cusseta is located on the fringe of Cusseta Mountain, 11.5 mi (18.5 km) northwest of Linden in northwestern Cass County.

== Education ==
Cusseta had its own school in 1884. Today, the community is served by the Atlanta Independent School District.
