= Red Hill, Cass County, Texas =

- Unincorporated community
- Location within Texas Location within the United States
- Coordinates: 33°7′23″N 94°22′17″W
- Country: United States
- State: Texas
- County: Cass
- Elevation: 305 ft (93 m)
- Time zone: UTC-6 (Central (CST))
  - Summer (DST): UTC-5 (CDT)
- Area codes: 903 & 430
- GNIS feature ID: 1378941

Red Hill is an unincorporated community in Cass County, Texas, United States. According to the Handbook of Texas, the community had a population of 28 in 2000.

== Geography ==
Red Hill is located at the intersection of Texas State Highway 8 and Farm to Market Road 995, 8 mi (13 km) north of Linden and 12 mi (19 km) west of Atlanta in central Cass County.

== Education ==
Red Hill had its own school in 1884. Today, the community is served by the Linden-Kildare Consolidated Independent School District.
