= Smyrna, Texas =

- Unincorporated community
- Location within Texas Location within the United States
- Coordinates: 33°04′41″N 94°05′04″W
- Country: United States
- State: Texas
- County: Cass
- Elevation: 312 ft (95 m)
- Time zone: UTC-6 (Central (CST))
  - Summer (DST): UTC-5 (CDT)
- Area codes: 903 & 430
- GNIS feature ID: 1347312

Smyrna is an unincorporated community in Cass County, Texas, United States. According to the Handbook of Texas, the community had a population of 215 in 2000.

== History ==
Smyrna was settled in the 1880s and was named for Smyrna, Turkey, where an early Christian church suffered from persecution. Smyrna Baptist Church of Christ was established on August 9, 1882, with Nelson Porterfield serving as pastor. It was soon built three years later. Another land grant was given to the community in 1907 for another church as well as a cemetery in 1907. Reverend J.M. Copeland organized a Church of Christ in Smyrna in 1896 and was erected in 1913. They became the focal point of Smyrna by the 1930s. Two new Baptist churches were completed in 1941 and 1977. They both received Texas historical markers in 1982. The church also served as a community center. Its population was 215 in 2000.

== Geography ==
Smyrna is located on Texas State Highway 77, 6 mi (9.7 km) southeast of Atlanta in eastern Cass County.

== Education ==
The local church congregation held services at a local schoolhouse until a church was built. Smyrna became a school district in the 1930s. Today, the community is served by the Atlanta Independent School District.
