= Texas State Highway 8 =

State highway in Cass and Bowie counties in Texas, United States

State Highway 8

Route information
- Maintained by TxDOT
- Length: 41.7 mi (67.1 km)
- Existed: April 4, 1917–present

Major junctions
- South end: SH 155 in Linden
- US 67 in Corley; US 82 in New Boston; I-30 in New Boston
- North end: AR 41 near New Boston

Location
- Country: United States
- State: Texas
- Counties: Cass, Bowie

Highway system
- Highways in Texas; Interstate; US; State; Former; Toll; Loops; Spurs; FM/RM; Park; Rec
| ← RE 7 | → Beltway 8 |

State Highway 8 (SH 8) is a north–south state highway in Cass and Bowie counties in Texas, United States, that runs from the Red River, which serves as the boundary between Texas and Arkansas, north of New Boston to SH 155 at Linden.

== Route description ==
SH 8 begins on the south side of the city on Linden at an intersection with SH 155, less than a quarter of a mile west of its intersection with US Route 59 (Future Interstate 369). The highway travels north through northern Cass County, crossing over Wright Patman Lake into Bowie County. The highway briefly turns west with US Route 67 when they intersect in Maud. The route then turns back north, running along the western edge of the Red River Army Depot. It then passes through the city of New Boston and intersects Interstate 30. The route then continues north, crossing the Red River, and the Arkansas state line, where it becomes Arkansas Highway 41.

== History ==
Historic SH 8

SH 8 was one of the original twenty five state highways on June 21, 1917, proposed as an 'East Texas Highway.' In 1919 the routing follows the present day SH 8 from the Arkansas state line to its terminus in Linden, then continued south on present day U.S. Highway 59 through Marshall, to Carthage. On U.S. Highway 96, SH 8 traveled through San Augustine, Jasper to its junction with SH 62, where it turned towards to its terminus in Port Arthur.

On August 21, 1922, SH 8 was rerouted from Buna to Beaumont and into Port Arthur via present day US 96. On October 20, 1924, it was rerouted over SH 38, which was cancelled, and concurrent with part of SH 43. In 1926, SH 8 was rerouted back on its previously planned route, with the old route being transferred to SH 43 and SH 26A. US 59 was co-located over most of SH 8. On November 28, 1933, SH 8 Loop was designated in Beaumont. On February 18, 1936, SH 8 Loop was designated in Buna. On December 20, 1937, two SH 8 Spur routes were designated in Jasper. While the entirety of the route maintained its number, on September 26, 1939, the co-designations were dropped (with US 96 replacing part of US 59), leaving only the Arkansas-Corley segment to the old highway. The SH 8 Loop and SH 8 Spur routes were renumbered Loop 7 (Jasper), Loop 8 (Beaumont), and Loop 68 (Buna). On October 13, 1947, a small segment was reassigned back to SH 8 from US 59 from Corley to Linden when US 59 was rerouted further east.

SH 8 was rerouted around the western side of Linden on June 22, 1964, with the old route becoming FM 125 and Spur 400.

Historic SH 8A

SH 8A was an alternate routing designated on June 17, 1918, just east of SH 8 from Shelbyville to Orange. On August 21, 1923, it had been renumbered as SH 87, with the section from Shelbyville to Milam cancelled. SH 8A was reassigned as a spur from SH 8 to Gary. This highway was erroneously omitted from the March 19, 1930 log, so was unnumbered that day. On November 30, 1932, the former SH 8A was added to the highway log, but was renumbered as SH 181. Another SH 8A had been planned from SH 8 in Horton to SH 64 on January 11, 1927. This was eliminated shortly after designation.

Historic SH 8B

SH 8B was a spur route designated on May 21, 1923, from Buna to Orange. On August 21, 1923, this was renumbered as SH 62. It was reassigned as a spur route on September 16, 1926, going from St. Augustine south to Zavalla. On March 19, 1930, this route was renumbered as SH 147.

== Major intersections ==
| County | Location | mi | km | Destinations | Notes |
|---|---|---|---|---|---|
| Cass | Linden | 0.0 | 0.0 | SH 155 to US 59 (Future I-369) – Jefferson, Gilmer | U.S. 59 is the future Interstate 369 |
| Cass | Linden | 1.0 | 1.6 | SH 11 – Hughes Springs, Daingerfield | |
| Cass | Linden | 1.5 | 2.4 | FM 1399 north | |
| Cass | | 2.3 | 3.7 | FM 125 east | |
| Cass | Red Hill | 9.0 | 14.5 | FM 995 – Carterville, Atlanta | |
| Cass | Douglassville | 13.9 | 22.4 | SH 77 – Naples, Atlanta | |
| Bowie | Maud | 23.0 | 37.0 | FM 2624 east | |
| Bowie | Maud | 24.1 | 38.8 | US 67 north | Southern end of US 67 concurrency |
| Bowie | Corley | 27.0 | 43.5 | US 67 south – Mount Pleasant | Northern end of US 67 concurrency |
| Bowie | Old Boston | 32.6 | 52.5 | FM 2149 east – Rock Creek | Southern end of FM 2149 concurrency |
| Bowie | | 32.7 | 52.6 | FM 2149 west – Moss Springs | Northern end of FM 2149 concurrency |
| Bowie | New Boston | 35.3 | 56.8 | FM 1840 west (Walters Boulevard) | |
| Bowie | New Boston | 36.6 | 58.9 | US 82 – New Boston, Texarkana | Interchange |
| Bowie | New Boston | 37.6 | 60.5 | I-30 – Dallas, Texarkana | Diamond interchange: I-30 exit 201 |
| Bowie | | 41.7 | 67.1 | AR 41 north (Marion H. Crank Memorial Bridge) – Foreman | Continuation into Arkansas |
1.000 mi = 1.609 km; 1.000 km = 0.621 mi: Concurrency terminus

== See also ==
- List of state highways in Texas
