= Three States, Arkansas, Louisiana, and Texas =

Three States, Arkansas, Louisiana, Texas
- Unincorporated community
- Ark-La-Tex tripoint marker

- Location within the United States Location within Texas Location within Louisiana Location within Arkansas
- Coordinates: 33°01′09″N 94°02′34″W
- Country: United States
- States: Texas, Louisiana, Arkansas
- Parish/Counties: Cass County, Texas; Caddo Parish, Louisiana; Miller County, Arkansas
- Elevation: 226 ft (69 m)
- Time zone: UTC-6 (Central (CST))
  - Summer (DST): UTC-5 (CDT)
- ZIP Codes: 75551 (Atlanta, TX), 71069 (Rodessa, LA), 71834 (Doddridge, AR)
- Area codes: 903 & 430 (Texas), 318 & 457 (Louisiana), 870 & 327 (Arkansas)
- GNIS feature ID: 1348527

Three States is an unincorporated community in Caddo Parish, Louisiana, Miller County, Arkansas, and Cass County, Texas, United States, within the broader Ark-La-Tex region. The community is at the tripoint of the states of Texas, Arkansas, and Louisiana. In 2000, the population was 45. The Arkansas and Louisiana sides are respectively part of the Texarkana and Shreveport – Bossier City metropolitan areas while the Texas side is not included within either metropolitan area.

== History ==
The Three States area may have been developed during an oil boom in the early 1920s. County maps from the next decade showed homes and businesses scattered along the highway. It then showed houses on the Texas side of the community and small businesses on the Louisiana and Arkansas sides in the last half of the 20th century. Its population was 45 in 2000.

== Geography ==
Three States is located on Texas State Highway 77, 9 mi (14 km) southeast of Atlanta on the eastern border of Cass County, the northwestern border of Caddo Parish in Louisiana, and the southwestern corner of Miller County in Arkansas.

== Education ==
Kids who live on the Texas side of the community attend the Atlanta Independent School District, the Louisiana side is in the Caddo Parish School District, and the Arkansas side is served by the Fouke School District.
