= Gum Springs, Texas =

- Unincorporated community
- Location within Texas Location within the United States
- Coordinates: 33°8′58″N 94°21′39″W
- Country: United States
- State: Texas
- County: Cass
- Elevation: 384 ft (117 m)
- Time zone: UTC-6 (Central (CST))
  - Summer (DST): UTC-5 (CDT)
- Area codes: 903 & 430
- GNIS feature ID: 1378396

Gum Springs is an unincorporated community in Cass County, Texas, United States. According to the Handbook of Texas, the community had a population of 50 in 2000.

== History ==
The area in what is known as Gum Springs today was first settled as early as 1850 due to the hot springs in the area. These, along with the gum trees in the area, gave the community its name. It was a shipping point for farmers and had two churches in the 1930s, alongside many farms. Only one church and a cemetery remained in the 1980s and the population was recorded as 50 in 2000.

== Geography ==
Gum Springs is located on Texas State Highway 8, 9 mi (14 km) north of Linden in north-central Cass County.

== Education ==
Gum Springs had a school for African Americans in the 1930s. Today, the community is served by the Linden-Kildare Consolidated Independent School District.
