= King's Farm, Texas =

Ghost town in Texas, US

Coordinates: 33.1525°N 94.4914°W

King's Farm or Kings Farm is a ghost town in Cass County, Texas, United States, 18 miles (29 km) from the city of Linden and 21 miles (34 km) from Atlanta. The town was abandoned in 1936.
