= Fairview, Cass County, Texas =

- Unincorporated community
- Location within Texas Location within the United States
- Coordinates: 32°56′47″N 94°22′42″W
- Country: United States
- State: Texas
- County: Cass
- Elevation: 354 ft (108 m)
- Time zone: UTC-6 (Central (CST))
  - Summer (DST): UTC-5 (CDT)
- Area codes: 903 & 430
- GNIS feature ID: 1378284

Fairview is an unincorporated community in Cass County, Texas, United States. According to the Handbook of Texas, the community had a population of 20 in 2000.

== History ==
The area in what is known as Fairview today may have been settled by the early 1900s. A 1933 county map showed Fairview as a station on the United States and Northwestern Railroad. Besides the railroad, the community also had some farms and a mine in the 1930s. The small community only had 20 residents in 2000.

== Geography ==
Fairview is located within a mile of U.S. Highway 59, 4 mi (6.4 km) southwest of Linden in southern Cass County.

== Education ==
Fairview had two schools in the 1930s, one for African Americans. Today, the community is served by the Linden-Kildare Consolidated Independent School District.
