= Pruitt, Texas =

- Unincorporated community
- Location within Texas Location within the United States
- Coordinates: 32°53′30″N 94°21′29″W
- Country: United States
- State: Texas
- County: Cass
- Elevation: 381 ft (116 m)
- Time zone: UTC-6 (Central (CST))
  - Summer (DST): UTC-5 (CDT)
- Area codes: 903 & 430
- GNIS feature ID: 1388198

Pruitt is an unincorporated community in Cass County, Texas, United States. According to the Handbook of Texas, the community had a population of 25 in 2000.

== History ==
Pruitt was named for local settler Robert A. Pruitt. Cemeteries in the community reveal that Pruitt was first settled in the 1860s. It had a small business and some widely scattered homes in 1983. Its population was 25 in 2000.

== Geography ==
Pruitt is located on Farm to Market Road 2683, 8 mi (13 km) south of Linden in southern Cass County.

== Education ==
Today, the community is served by the Linden-Kildare Consolidated Independent School District.
