= Lanier, Texas =

- Unincorporated community
- Location within Texas Location within the United States
- Coordinates: 32°56′7″N 94°22′26″W
- Country: United States
- State: Texas
- County: Cass
- Elevation: 338 ft (103 m)
- Time zone: UTC-6 (Central (CST))
  - Summer (DST): UTC-5 (CDT)
- Area codes: 903 & 430
- GNIS feature ID: 1378558

Lanier is an unincorporated community in Cass County, Texas, United States. According to the Handbook of Texas, the community had a population of 43 in 2000.

== History ==
The area in what is known as Lanier today was first settled in the early 1870s.

== Geography ==
Lanier is located on Texas State Highway 59, 5 mi (8.0 km) south of Linden in Cass County.

== Education ==
Today, the community is served by the Linden-Kildare Consolidated Independent School District.
