= Dalton, Texas =

- Unincorporated community
- Location within Texas Location within the United States
- Coordinates: 33°12′17″N 94°35′49″W
- Country: United States
- State: Texas
- County: Cass
- Elevation: 351 ft (107 m)
- Time zone: UTC-6 (Central (CST))
  - Summer (DST): UTC-5 (CDT)
- Area codes: 903 & 430
- GNIS feature ID: 1378199

Dalton is an unincorporated community in Cass County, Texas, United States. According to the Handbook of Texas, the community had a population of 50 in 2000.

== History ==
Dalton was founded sometime after the American Civil War. A post office was established at Dalton in 1875 and remained in operation until 1905, with an interruption from 1887 to 1897. It reached its zenith in 1884 when it had 200 residents served by six churches and three saw and flour mills. From 1940 to 1983, only a church and cemetery remained in Dalton. It was listed on county maps in 1990. Its population was 50 in 2000.

== Geography ==
Dalton is located on Texas State Highway 77, 3.5 mi (5.6 km) northwest of Marietta in northwestern Cass County.

== Education ==
Dalton had two schools in 1884 and only one in 1940. Today, the community is served by the Pewitt Consolidated Independent School District.
