= New Colony, Cass County, Texas =

- Unincorporated community
- Location within Texas Location within the United States
- Coordinates: 33°2′52″N 94°17′57″W
- Country: United States
- State: Texas
- County: Cass
- Elevation: 302 ft (92 m)
- Time zone: UTC-6 (Central (CST))
  - Summer (DST): UTC-5 (CDT)
- Area codes: 903 & 430
- GNIS feature ID: 1378738

New Colony is an unincorporated community in Cass County, Texas, United States. According to the Handbook of Texas, the community had a population of 65 in 2000.

== History ==
New Colony was first settled in the late 1880s by people from South Carolina. The wife of J.T. Latham decided to name it New Colony since it was their new home.

== Geography ==
New Colony is located on Texas State Highway 59, 4 mi (6.4 km) northeast of Linden in east-central Cass County.

== Education ==
New Colony had its own school in the 1930s. Today, the community is served by the Linden-Kildare Consolidated Independent School District.
