= Almira, Texas =

- Unincorporated community
- Location within Texas Location within the United States
- Coordinates: 33°06′00″N 94°26′44″W
- Country: United States
- State: Texas
- County: Cass
- Elevation: 361 ft (110 m)
- Time zone: UTC-6 (Central (CST))
  - Summer (DST): UTC-5 (CDT)
- Area codes: 903 & 430
- GNIS feature ID: 1377927

Almira is an unincorporated community in Cass County, Texas, United States. According to the Handbook of Texas, the community had a population of 30 in 2000.

== History ==
The area in what is known as Almira today was first settled sometime before the American Civil War. A post office was established at Almira in 1886 and remained in operation until 1905, with Elijah J. Hanes serving as postmaster. The community had 25 residents served by a store and a blacksmith shop in the 1890s. It went up to 102 residents in 1904, then plummeted to 30 in 2000. Almira had a business and some houses in 1936. The business continued to operate in 1983.

== Geography ==
Almira is located at the intersection of Farm to Market Roads 995 and 1399, 8 mi (13 km) northwest of Linden in northwestern Cass County.

== Education ==
Almira had its own school in 1936 which closed by 1983. Today, the community is served by the Linden-Kildare Consolidated Independent School District.
