= Roach, Texas =

- Unincorporated community
- Location within Texas Location within the United States
- Coordinates: 33°4′10″N 94°16′19″W
- Country: United States
- State: Texas
- County: Cass
- Elevation: 348 ft (106 m)
- Time zone: UTC-6 (Central (CST))
  - Summer (DST): UTC-5 (CDT)
- Area codes: 903 & 430
- GNIS feature ID: 1378961

Roach is an unincorporated community in Cass County, Texas, United States. According to the Handbook of Texas, the community had a population of 50 in 2000.

== History ==
Roach was said to be named for the family of local physician Dr. J. Roach. A post office was established at Roach in 1898 and remained in operation until 1904, with James O'Rear serving as postmaster. It had two churches and several scattered houses in 1936. Only one church remained alongside the houses in 1983. Its population was 50 in 2000.

== Geography ==
Roach is located 6 mi (9.7 km) northeast of Linden in eastern Cass County.

== Education ==
Today, the community is served by the Linden-Kildare Consolidated Independent School District.
