= Carterville, Texas =

- Unincorporated community
- Location within Texas Location within the United States
- Coordinates: 33°04′09″N 94°28′20″W
- Country: United States
- State: Texas
- County: Cass
- Elevation: 282 ft (86 m)
- Time zone: UTC-6 (Central (CST))
  - Summer (DST): UTC-5 (CDT)
- Area codes: 903 & 430
- GNIS feature ID: 1378096

Carterville is an unincorporated community in Cass County, Texas, United States. According to the Handbook of Texas, the community had a population of 39 in 2000.

== History ==
Carterville was said to have been settled in the 1860s and was named for a family of local settlers. In the 1960s, the community reached its population zenith of 75. There was a business, a town hall, and a church in Carterville in 1983. The population went down to 25 in 1990 then grew to 39 in 2000.

== Geography ==
Carterville is located at the intersection of Farm to Market Roads 995 and 130, 7 mi (11 km) northwest of Linden in western Cass County.

== Education ==
Today, the community is served by the Linden-Kildare Consolidated Independent School District.
