= Texas State Highway 338 =

State highway in Texas

State Highway 338
- SH 338, highlighted in red

Route information
- Maintained by TxDOT
- Length: 6.722 mi (10.818 km)
- Existed: 1940–present

Major junctions
- South end: US 259 in Rocky Branch
- North end: SH 77 in Naples

Location
- Country: United States
- State: Texas

Highway system
- Highways in Texas; Interstate; US; State; Former; Toll; Loops; Spurs; FM/RM; Park; Rec
← SH 337	→ SH 339

State Highway 338 (SH 338) is a 6.722-mile (10.818 km) state highway in the U.S. state of Texas. The highway begins at a junction with U.S. Highway 259 (US 259) in Rocky Branch and heads north to a junction with State Highway 77 (SH 77) in Naples.

== History ==
SH 338 was designated on November 22, 1940, to serve as a route between Rocky Branch and Naples.

== Route description ==
SH 338 begins at a junction with US 259 in Rocky Branch. It heads north from this junction to an intersection with FM 161. SH 338 reaches its northern terminus at SH 77 in Naples.

== Junction list ==
The entire route is in Morris County.

Location	mi	km	Destinations	Notes
	0.0	0.0	US 259 – Daingerfield, Omaha	
	5.2	8.4	FM 161	
Naples	6.7	10.8	SH 77 – Douglassville	
1.000 mi = 1.609 km; 1.000 km = 0.621 mi
