= Dwayne Jiles =

American football player (born 1961)

No. 53, 54
- Position: Linebacker

Personal information
- Born: November 23, 1961 (age 64); Linden, Texas, U.S.
- Listed height: 6 ft 4 in (1.93 m)
- Listed weight: 242 lb (110 kg)

Career information
- High school: Linden-Kildare
- College: Texas Tech
- NFL draft: 1985: 5th round, 121st overall pick

Career history
- Philadelphia Eagles (1985–1989); New York Giants (1989)

Awards and highlights
- First-team All-SWC (1984)

Career NFL statistics
- Sacks: 3.5
- Fumble recoveries: 2
- Stats at Pro Football Reference

Dwayne Earl Jiles (born November 23, 1961) is an American former professional football player who was a linebacker in the National Football League (NFL) for the Philadelphia Eagles and New York Giants. He was born in Linden, Texas, played college football for the Texas Tech Red Raiders and was selected in the fifth round of the 1985 NFL draft with the 121st overall pick.

In his professional career, Jiles played in 61 games and started eight over five seasons.
