= Huffins, Texas =

- Unincorporated community
- Location within Texas Location within the United States
- Coordinates: 32°59′57″N 94°08′09″W
- Country: United States
- State: Texas
- County: Cass
- Elevation: 318 ft (97 m)
- Time zone: UTC-6 (Central (CST))
  - Summer (DST): UTC-5 (CDT)
- Area codes: 903 & 430
- GNIS feature ID: 1380862

Huffins, also known as Huffines, is an unincorporated community in Cass County, Texas, United States. According to the Handbook of Texas, the community had a population of 140 in 2000.

== Geography ==
Huffins is located at the intersection of Farm to Market Roads 251 and 1841, 8 mi (13 km) southeast of Atlanta in southeastern Cass County.

== Education ==
Huffins had its own school in 1884. Today, the community is served by the Atlanta Independent School District.
