= Cass, Texas =

- Unincorporated community
- Location within Texas Location within the United States
- Coordinates: 33°11′42″N 94°03′48″W
- Country: United States
- State: Texas
- County: Cass
- Elevation: 240 ft (73 m)
- Time zone: UTC-6 (Central (CST))
  - Summer (DST): UTC-5 (CDT)
- Area codes: 903 & 430
- GNIS feature ID: 1378099

Cass is an unincorporated community in Cass County, Texas, United States. According to the Handbook of Texas, the community had a population of 60 in 2000.

== History ==
Cass was first settled in the early 1890s after the construction of the Texarkana and Fort Smith Railway The population was 60 in 2000. It was said to have anticipated a future in steel manufacturing.

== Geography ==
Cass is located on the Kansas City Southern Railway on Farm to Market Road 251, 8 mi (13 km) northeast of Atlanta in northeastern Cass County.

== Education ==
Today, the community is served by the Bloomburg Independent School District.
