= Lanark, Texas =

- Unincorporated community
- Location within Texas Location within the United States
- Coordinates: 33°10′55″N 94°08′58″W
- Country: United States
- State: Texas
- County: Cass
- Elevation: 331 ft (101 m)
- Time zone: UTC-6 (Central (CST))
  - Summer (DST): UTC-5 (CDT)
- Area codes: 903 & 430
- GNIS feature ID: 1378556

Lanark is an unincorporated community in Cass County, Texas, United States. According to the Handbook of Texas, the community had a population of 30 in 2000.

== History ==
Lanark was first settled in the early 1870s when the Texas and Pacific Railway passed through the town. A post office existed from 1873 to 1877. It is reported that there were difficulties in developing land grants in the area, resulting in some residents relocating to either Queen City or Atlanta. Lanark only consisted of a few scattered houses in 1983. In 2000, the population was 30.

== Geography ==
Lanark is located on U.S. Highway 59, 2 mi (3.2 km) north of Queen City in northeastern Cass County.

== Education ==
Lanark is served by the Queen City Independent School District.
