= Nickleberry, Texas =

- Unincorporated community
- Location within Texas Location within the United States
- Coordinates: 33°08′48″N 94°31′13″W
- Country: United States
- State: Texas
- County: Cass
- Elevation: 394 ft (120 m)
- Time zone: UTC-6 (Central (CST))
  - Summer (DST): UTC-5 (CDT)
- Area codes: 903 & 430
- GNIS feature ID: 1378756

Nickleberry is an unincorporated community in Cass County, Texas, United States. According to the Handbook of Texas, there were no population estimates available for the community in 2000.

== History ==
Nickleberry was most likely named for Robert ( Bob)Nickleberry's family, who lived in the area in the early 1900s. The community had a church and a business in 1983. Robert also established and ran a store in the community. Located off FM 1399 and Cr. 2355 It was listed on county maps in 2000, but there were population estimates of 203 residents available.

== Geography ==
Nickleberry is located on Farm to Market Road 1399, 2 mi (3.2 km) southeast of Marietta in northwestern Cass County.

== Education ==
Nickleberry became the focus of a county school district in the 1940s for African American students. The school continued to operate in 1983. Today, the community is served by the Pewitt Consolidated Independent School District.
