= O'Farrell, Texas =

- Unincorporated community
- Location within Texas Location within the United States
- Coordinates: 33°7′28″N 94°19′15″W
- Country: United States
- State: Texas
- County: Cass
- Elevation: 381 ft (116 m)
- Time zone: UTC-6 (Central (CST))
  - Summer (DST): UTC-5 (CDT)
- Area codes: 903 & 430
- GNIS feature ID: 1378775

O'Farrell is an unincorporated community in Cass County, Texas, United States. According to the Handbook of Texas, the community had a population of 20 in 2000.

== History ==
The area was first settled in the 1870s.

== Geography ==
O'Farrell is located on Farm to Market Road 995, 9 mi (14 km) west of Atlanta in northern Cass County.

== Education ==
Today, the community is served by the Linden-Kildare Consolidated Independent School District.
