= Corley, Texas =

- Unincorporated community
- Location within Texas Location within the United States
- Coordinates: 33°19′34″N 94°23′40″W
- Country: United States
- State: Texas
- County: Bowie
- Elevation: 299 ft (91 m)
- Time zone: UTC-6 (Central (CST))
  - Summer (DST): UTC-5 (CDT)
- Area codes: 903 & 430
- GNIS feature ID: 1380832

Corley is an unincorporated community in Bowie County, in the U.S. state of Texas. According to the Handbook of Texas, the community had a population of 35 in 2000. It is located within the Texarkana metropolitan area.

== History ==
Corley was named for early settler John C. Corley. A post office was established at Corley in 1882 and remained in operation until the 1950s, with J. Carr Turner as postmaster. It had 75 residents served by a sawmill, a gristmill, a gin, a store, and a hotel in 1884. The population rose to 100 in 1890, then declined by half over the next six years. It further declined, to 35 from 1982 through 2000, and had no businesses.

== Geography ==
Corley is located on the St. Louis Southwestern Railway, 3 mi (4.8 km) west of Maud in southern Bowie County.

== Education ==
Corley is served by the New Boston Independent School District.
