= Cusseta Mountain =

Hill in Cass County, Texas, United States

- Location within Texas

Highest point
- Elevation: 632 ft (193 m)
- Prominence: 307 ft (94 m)
- Parent peak: Luciano Mesa
- Coordinates: 33°10′28″N 94°27′57″W

Geography
- Location: Cass County, Texas, U.S.
- Topo map: USGS Bryans Mill

Cusseta Mountain is a hill in northeast Texas with summit 632 feet (193 m) above sea level. Cusseta Mountain is located about 6 miles (9.7 km) west of Douglassville, Texas. It is the highest point in Cass County, Texas, and is the site of several communication towers. In the late 19th century, the community of Cusseta was at the base of the hill.
