= Bryans Mill, Texas =

- Unincorporated community
- Location within Texas Location within the United States
- Coordinates: 33°14′02″N 94°29′58″W
- Country: United States
- State: Texas
- County: Cass
- Elevation: 322 ft (98 m)
- Time zone: UTC-6 (Central (CST))
  - Summer (DST): UTC-5 (CDT)
- Area codes: 903 & 430
- GNIS feature ID: 1331465

Bryans Mill is an unincorporated community in Cass County, Texas, United States. According to the Handbook of Texas, the community had a population of 71 in 2000.

== History ==
On October 25, 1936, Major Charles H. Howard, winner of the 1932 Mackay Trophy, and Sgt. Edward Gibson were killed in the crash of their Martin B-10B, 34–83, just outside Bryans Mill.

== Geography ==
Bryans Mill is located at the intersection of Farm to Market Roads 994 and 1766, 17 mi (27 km) northwest of Linden in northwestern Cass County.

== Education ==
Bryans Mill had its own school in 1884. Today, the community is served by the Pewitt Consolidated Independent School District.
