= Derrick Blaylock =

American football player (born 1979)

No. 23
- Position: Running back

Personal information
- Born: August 23, 1979 (age 47); Atlanta, Texas, U.S.
- Listed height: 5 ft 8 in (1.73 m)
- Listed weight: 208 lb (94 kg)

Career information
- High school: Atlanta
- College: Stephen F. Austin
- NFL draft: 2001: 5th round, 150th overall pick

Career history
- Kansas City Chiefs (2001–2004); New York Jets (2005–2006); Washington Redskins (2007)*
- * Offseason or practice squad member only

Career NFL statistics
- Rushing attempts: 198
- Rushing yards: 820
- Rushing touchdowns: 10
- Receptions: 53
- Receiving yards: 520
- Receiving touchdowns: 2
- Stats at Pro Football Reference

Derrick Blaylock (born August 23, 1979) is an American former professional football player who was a running back in the National Football League (NFL). He played college football for the Stephen F. Austin Lumberjacks and was selected by the Kansas City Chiefs in the fifth round of the 2001 NFL draft. Blaylock also played for the New York Jets.

== Early life ==
Blaylock attended Atlanta High School in Atlanta, Texas, and was a standout in football, track, and basketball. In football, he was a three-time All-District selection. In basketball, he was a second-team All-District selection and in track, he placed second on the 100 meter dash at the state Class 3A finals with a time of 10.7 seconds, and set the school record in the 100 meter dash with a time of 10.44 seconds.

== Professional career ==
On April 22, 2001, Blaylock was selected 150th overall in the fifth round of the 2001 NFL draft by the Kansas City Chiefs.

Blaylock scored four rushing touchdowns in one game for the Chiefs, along with Priest Holmes on October 24, 2004, vs the Atlanta Falcons. Blaylock would be one of three running backs for Kansas City to have a 100-yard rushing game during the 2004 season, along with Priest Holmes and Larry Johnson.

On February 28, 2007, the New York Jets released Blaylock. On May 7, 2007, Blaylock signed a contract with the Washington Redskins, but was cut on September 3, after reaching an injury settlement.

== NFL career statistics ==
Legend
**Bold**	Career high

=== Regular season ===
Year	Team	Games		Rushing					Receiving				
Year	Team	GP	GS	Att	Yds	Avg	Lng	TD	Rec	Yds	Avg	Lng	TD
2002	KAN	12	0	16	72	4.5	16	0	5	47	9.4	21	0
2003	KAN	**16**	0	22	112	**5.1**	**25**	2	15	181	**12.1**	**63**	**1**
2004	KAN	12	**5**	**118**	**539**	4.6	24	**8**	**25**	**246**	9.8	30	**1**
2005	NYJ	7	1	17	53	3.1	11	0	3	17	5.7	10	0
2006	NYJ	4	2	25	44	1.8	6	0	5	29	5.8	9	0
		51	8	198	820	4.1	25	10	53	520	9.8	63	2

=== Playoffs ===
Year	Team	Games		Rushing					Receiving				
Year	Team	GP	GS	Att	Yds	Avg	Lng	TD	Rec	Yds	Avg	Lng	TD
2003	KAN	**1**	0	**2**	-3	-1.5	-1	0	**1**	**11**	**11.0**	**11**	0
		1	0	2	-3	-1.5	-1	0	1	11	11.0	11	0
