= Cornett, Texas =

- Unincorporated community
- Location within Texas Location within the United States
- Coordinates: 33°7′46″N 94°34′29″W
- Country: United States
- State: Texas
- County: Cass
- Elevation: 335 ft (102 m)
- Time zone: UTC-6 (Central (CST))
  - Summer (DST): UTC-5 (CDT)
- Area codes: 903 & 430
- GNIS feature ID: 1378163

Cornett is an unincorporated community in Cass County, Texas, United States. According to the Handbook of Texas, the community had a population of 30 in 2000.

== History ==
Cornett was settled sometime before the American Civil War as Hamil's Chapel, but was later renamed after a local family. The population remained at 30 in 1990 and 2000.

== Geography ==
Cornett is located at the intersection of Farm to Market Roads 2888, 250 and 2745, 12 mi (19 km) north of Hughes Springs and 8 mi (13 km) southeast of Naples in northwestern Cass County.

== Education ==
Today, the community is served by the Hughes Springs Independent School District.
