= Maud High School =

Location
- 389 Houston Street; Maud, Bowie County, Texas 75567; United States; 33.3250°N 94.3475°W

Information
- School type: Public, high school
- Established: 1905
- Locale: Rural: Distant
- School district: Maud ISD
- NCES School ID: 482946003317
- Principal: Scott Sanders
- Teaching staff: 40.03 (on an FTE basis)
- Grades: PK‍–‍12
- Enrollment: 456 (2023‍–‍2024)
- Student to teacher ratio: 11.39
- Colors: Maroon & White
- Athletics conference: UIL Class 2A
- Mascot: Cardinal
- Yearbook: The Cardinal
- Website: Maud High School

Maud High School is a public high school located in the city of Maud, Texas and classified as a 2A school by the University Interscholastic League (UIL). It is a part of the Maud Independent School District located in south central Bowie County. During 2022‍–‍2023, Maud School had an enrollment of 476 students and a student to teacher ratio of 11.49. The school received an overall rating of "A" from the Texas Education Agency for the 2024‍–‍2025 school year

== Athletics ==
The Maud Cardinals compete in these sports -

- Baseball
- Basketball
- Cross country
- Football
- Golf
- Powerlifting
- Softball
- Track and field
- Volleyball

=== State titles ===
- Baseball: 1989 (1A)
