= Kildare, Texas =

- Unincorporated community
- Location within Texas Location within the United States
- Coordinates: 32°56′35″N 94°14′54″W
- Country: United States
- State: Texas
- County: Cass
- Elevation: 315 ft (96 m)
- Time zone: UTC-6 (Central (CST))
  - Summer (DST): UTC-5 (CDT)
- Area codes: 903 & 430
- GNIS feature ID: 1374370

Kildare is an unincorporated community in Cass County, Texas, United States. According to the Handbook of Texas, the community had a population of 49 in 2000.

== History ==
The population was 106 in 2010.

Whittaker Memorial Cemetery is located near the community. Both it and the Masonic Lodge Hall and Baptist Church were added to the National Register of Historic Places.

== Geography ==
Kildare is located at the intersection of Farm to Market Roads 125 and 248, 8 mi (13 km) southeast of Linden, 12 mi (19 km) south of Atlanta, 40 mi (64 km) southwest of Texarkana, and 15 mi (24 km) northeast of Jefferson in southeastern Cass County.

== Education ==
Kildare had its own school in 1884. Today, the Linden-Kildare Consolidated Independent School District serves area students.

== Notable people ==
- Cliff Bell, Negro league player
- Shock Linwood, Baylor University running back
