= Antioch, Cass County, Texas =

- Unincorporated community
- Location within Texas Location within the United States
- Coordinates: 33°11′07″N 94°15′21″W
- Country: United States
- State: Texas
- County: Cass
- Elevation: 456 ft (139 m)
- Time zone: UTC-6 (Central (CST))
  - Summer (DST): UTC-5 (CDT)
- Area codes: 903 & 430
- GNIS feature ID: 1377945

Antioch is an unincorporated community in Cass County, Texas, United States. According to the Handbook of Texas, the community had a population of 45 in 2000.

== History ==
Antioch grew up around a church from 1856 and was originally called Anti. A post office was established in 1888 and remained in operation until 1904, with a brief closure from 1889 to 1901. The community had a church, a cemetery, and several scattered houses in 1936. It had 29 residents served by two businesses, a church, and a cemetery in 1983. The population remained at 29 in 1990 then grew to 45 in 2000.

== Geography ==
Antioch is located on Farm to Market Roads 96 and 2791, 7 mi (11 km) northwest of Atlanta in northeastern Cass County.

== Education ==
Antioch had its own school in 1936. Today, the community is served by the Queen City Independent School District.
