= Linden-Kildare High School =

Location
- 205 E Kildare Rd; Linden, Texas 75563; United States; 32.9781°N 94.3133°W

Information
- School type: Public high school
- School district: Linden-Kildare Consolidated Independent School District
- Principal: Shekita Martin
- Teaching staff: 23.53 (FTE)
- Grades: 9-12
- Enrollment: 180 (2023–2024)
- Student to teacher ratio: 7.65
- Colors: Blue & White
- Athletics conference: UIL Class 2A
- Mascot: Tiger
- Yearbook: Tiger Tracks
- Website: Linden-Kildare High School

Linden-Kildare High School is a public high school located 3.5 miles (5.6 km) southeast of Linden, Texas (USA). It is classified as a 2A school by the UIL. The school is part of the Linden-Kildare Consolidated Independent School District located in south central Cass County. The high school is a consolidation of Linden and Kildare schools. For the 2021-2022 school year, the school was given a "B" by the Texas Education Agency.

== Athletics ==
The school compete in the following sports:

- Baseball
- Basketball
- Cross Country
- Football
- Golf
- Powerlifting
- Softball
- Tennis
- Track and Field
- Volleyball

=== State Titles ===
- Baseball -
  - 1980(2A)
- Boys Basketball -
  - 1960(2A)
- Girls Track -
  - 1998(3A), 1999(3A)

== Notable alumni ==
- Don Henley - Founding member of The Eagles
- John Beasley (basketball) - Professional Basketball Player
- Richard Bowden - Musician and member of Pinkard and Bowden Country duo
- Edd Hargett - Professional Football Player
- Shock Linwood - American football running back
- T-Bone Walker - American blues guitarist, singer, songwriter and multi-instrumentalist
