= Douglassville =

Douglassville may refer to the following places in the United States:

- Douglassville, Pennsylvania
- Douglassville, Texas

== See also ==
- Douglasville, Georgia
