= Rickey Hatley =

American football player (born 1994)

No. 94
- Position: Defensive tackle

Personal information
- Born: March 29, 1994 (age 32); Atlanta, Texas, U.S.
- Listed height: 6 ft 4 in (1.93 m)
- Listed weight: 270 lb (122 kg)

Career information
- High school: Atlanta (Atlanta, Texas)
- College: Missouri
- NFL draft: 2017: undrafted

Career history
- Houston Texans (2017)*; Kansas City Chiefs (2017)*; Buffalo Bills (2017–2018); Birmingham Iron (2019)
- * Offseason or practice squad member only

Career NFL statistics
- Tackles: 1
- Stats at Pro Football Reference

Rickey Hatley (born March 29, 1994) is an American former professional football player who was a defensive tackle in the National Football League (NFL). He played college football for the Missouri Tigers.

== Professional career ==
=== Houston Texans ===
Hatley signed with the Houston Texans as an undrafted free agent on May 12, 2017. He was waived by the Texans on September 2, 2017.

=== Kansas City Chiefs ===
On September 12, 2017, Hatley was signed to the practice squad of the Kansas City Chiefs. He was released on September 19, 2017. He was re-signed on November 13, 2017. He was released again on December 14, 2017.

=== Buffalo Bills ===
On December 23, 2017, Hatley was signed to the Buffalo Bills' practice squad. He was promoted to the active roster on December 26, 2017.

On September 1, 2018, Hatley was waived by the Bills.

=== Birmingham Iron ===
On October 12, 2018, Hatley signed with the Birmingham Iron of the Alliance of American Football. The league ceased operations in April 2019.
