= Patman, Texas =

- Unincorporated community
- Location within Texas Location within the United States
- Coordinates: 32°57′18″N 94°34′21″W
- Country: United States
- State: Texas
- County: Cass
- Elevation: 289 ft (88 m)
- Time zone: UTC-6 (Central (CST))
  - Summer (DST): UTC-5 (CDT)
- Area codes: 903 & 430
- GNIS feature ID: 1377709

Patman is an unincorporated community in Cass County, Texas, United States. According to the Handbook of Texas, the community had a population of 40 in 2000.

== History ==
Patman was named for a local settler. The community originally centered around the Missouri-Kansas-Texas Railroad, which operated a switch station on a narrow-gauge line built here. It was soon taken over by the Kansas City Southern Railway and became a regular gauge. Patman had several scattered houses, a church, and a cemetery in 1990. Its population was 40 in 2000.

== Geography ==
Patman is located on Texas State Highway 49, 5 mi (8.0 km) north of Avinger in western Cass County.

== Education ==
Today, the community is served by the Avinger Independent School District.
