= Maud Independent School District =

School district in Texas

- Maud, Bowie, Texas

District information
- Grades: PK-12
- Established: 1905/10/7

Students and staff
- Students: 472
- Staff: 71

Other information
- Website: https://www.maudisd.net/

Maud Independent School District is a small school district located in Maud, Texas (USA). At the beginning of the 2005–2006 school year it had an enrollment of 471 students in grades pre-kindergarten through twelve. Included in the District is the Maud High School. On October 7, 2005, the district celebrated its 100-year anniversary. There are 72 employees.

In 2009, the school district was rated "academically acceptable" by the Texas Education Agency.
