= Drew Stubbs =

American baseball player (born 1984)

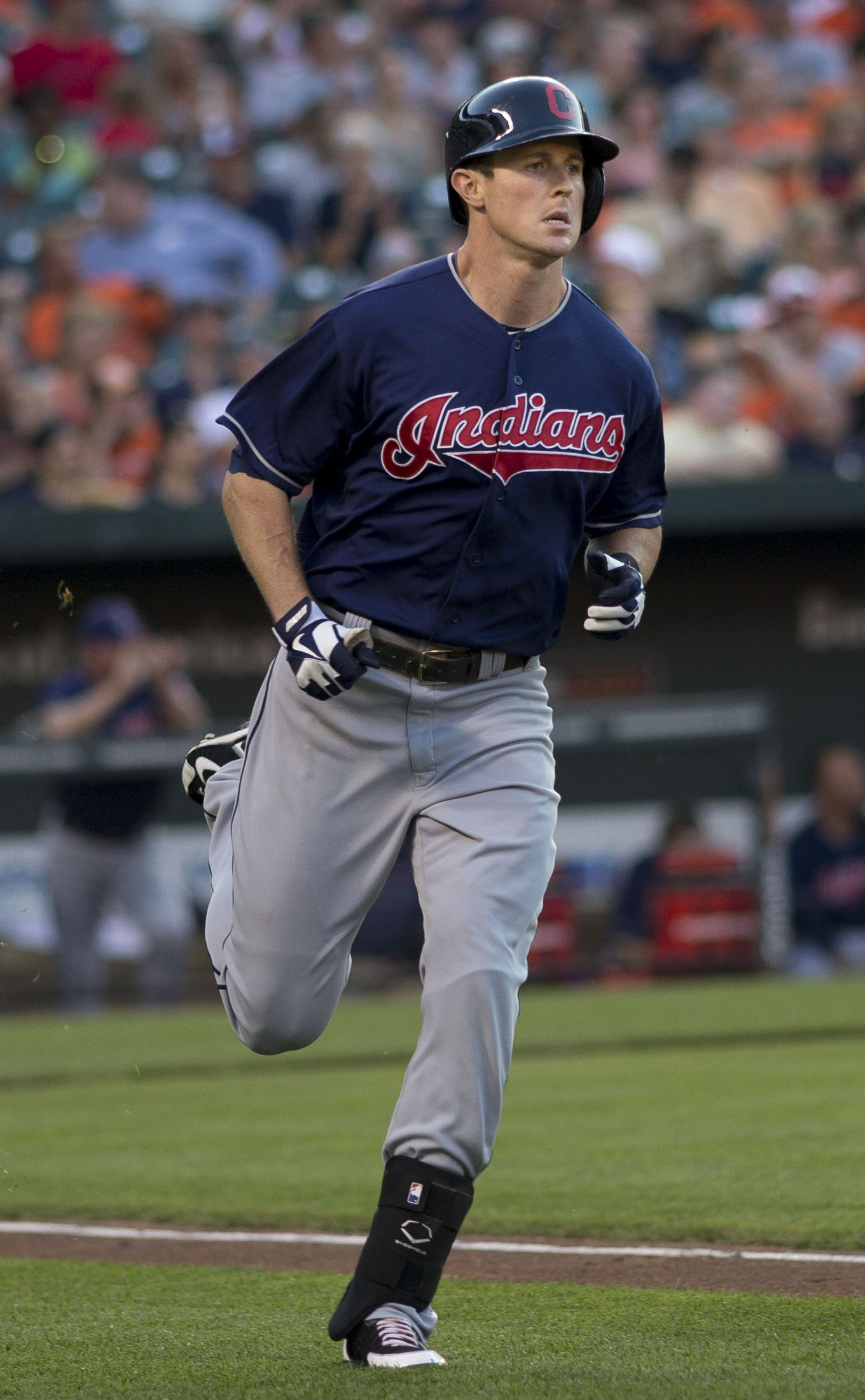
- Stubbs with the Cleveland Indians in 2013
- Center fielder
- Born: October 4, 1984 (age 42); Atlanta, Texas, U.S.
- Batted: Right Threw: Right

MLB debut
- August 19, 2009, for the Cincinnati Reds

Last MLB appearance
- May 5, 2017, for the San Francisco Giants

MLB statistics
- Batting average: .242
- Home runs: 92
- Runs batted in: 283
- Stats at Baseball Reference

Teams
- Cincinnati Reds (2009–2012); Cleveland Indians (2013); Colorado Rockies (2014–2015); Texas Rangers (2015); Atlanta Braves (2016); Texas Rangers (2016); Baltimore Orioles (2016); San Francisco Giants (2017)
Medals
Men's baseball
Representing United States
World University Championship
Gold medal – first place	2004 Tainan	Team

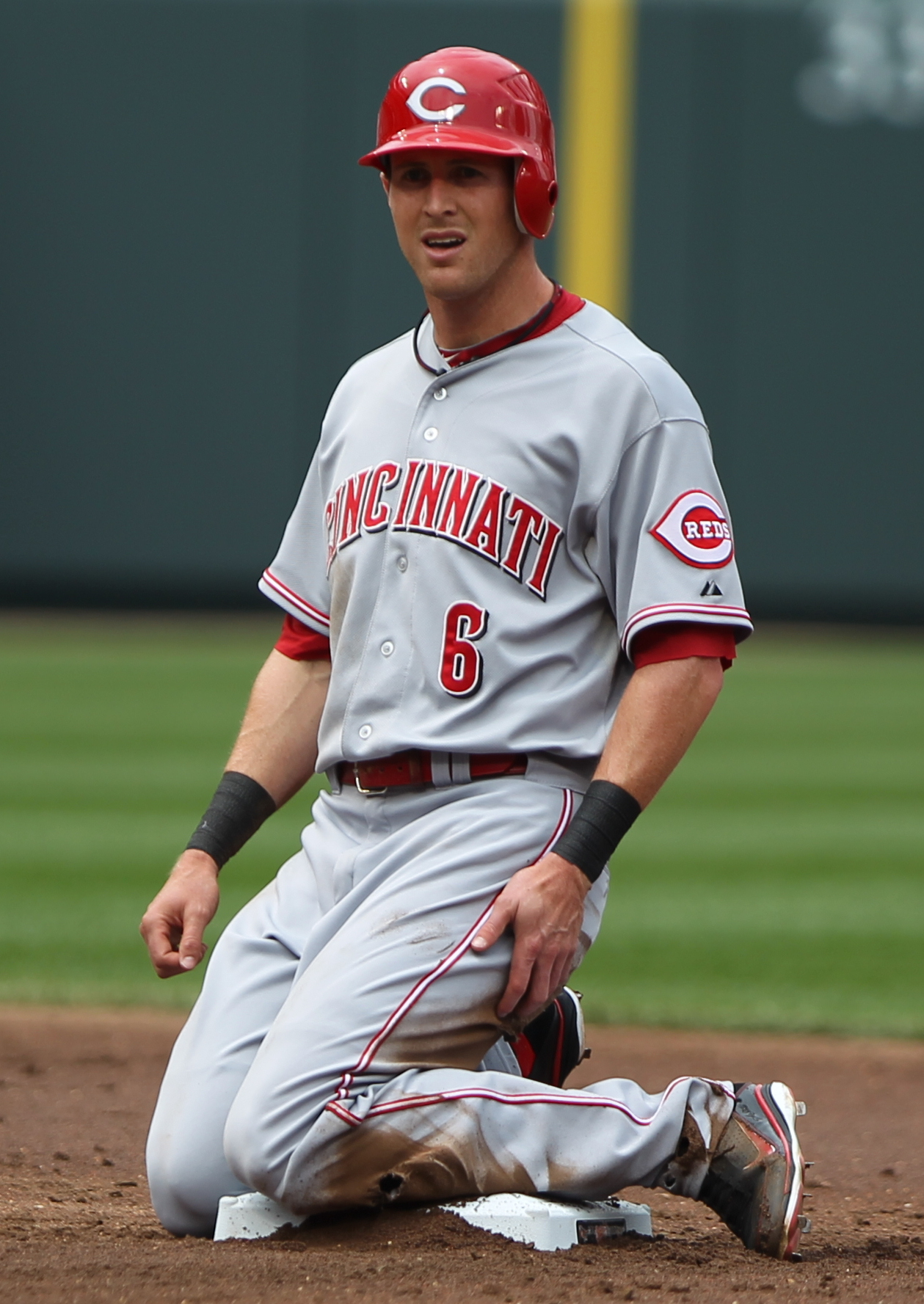
Stubbs during his tenure with the Cincinnati Reds in 2011

Robert Andrew Stubbs (born October 4, 1984) is an American former professional baseball outfielder. He played in Major League Baseball (MLB) for the Cincinnati Reds, Cleveland Indians, Colorado Rockies, Atlanta Braves, Texas Rangers, Baltimore Orioles and the San Francisco Giants.

== Before professional baseball ==
Drew Stubbs graduated from Atlanta High School in Atlanta, Texas in 2003. He was a three-time All-American in baseball and two-time academic All-American at the University of Texas. He hit a game-winning triple for Team USA in the gold medal game against Japan at the 2004 FISU II World University Baseball Championship in Taiwan. Stubbs was the Longhorns' co-MVP, named Big 12 co-Player of the Year, and one of five finalists for the Golden Spikes Award in 2006.

== Professional career ==
=== Draft and minors ===
Stubbs was the first-round pick (8th overall) of the Cincinnati Reds in the 2006 draft. In his 2006 season at the rookie class Billings Mustangs, Stubbs batted .256 with six home runs and 24 RBIs in 56 games, including three triples, in 210 at-bats.

Earning a promotion to the Class A Dayton Dragons (the low A team), he batted .270 with 12 home runs, 43 RBIs, and 23 stolen bases in 129 games, including an 11-game hit streak to start the year. His performance earned him a spot in the Midwest League All-Star Game. After the season, he was named the tenth-best prospect in the Midwest League and the fifth-best in the Reds' organization by Baseball America.

In the 2008 season Stubbs started with the Single-A Sarasota Reds (the high A team), then was promoted to the Double-A Chattanooga Lookouts, and finally to the Triple-A Louisville Bats. In a combined 131 plate appearances, he batted .277 with 7 home runs, 57 RBIs, and 33 stolen bases. His 33 steals led all Reds minor leaguers.

Stubbs represented the U.S. in the 2009 All-Star Futures Game. As of 2009, he was ranked as the Reds' third best prospect behind first baseman Yonder Alonso and shortstop Todd Frazier.

=== Cincinnati Reds ===
Stubbs made his Major League debut on August 19, 2009. In his second game, he hit a game-winning home run to beat the San Francisco Giants. He finished the season with a .267 average while hitting eight home runs during the last five-plus weeks of that season.

He hit his first career grand slam on April 9, 2010, against the Chicago Cubs. On July 4, 2010, he hit three home runs against the Cubs.

On July 24, 2011, Stubbs hit a leadoff walk-off home run on the first pitch from Atlanta Braves reliever Scott Linebrink to give the Reds a 4–3 win.

During the 2011 season, Stubbs had a .243 batting average, 15 homers, and 40 RBI. He led the Major Leagues with number of times striking out, totaling 205 times. He became only the 2nd player to strike out 200 or more times in a season. He was second in the league in stolen bases, with 40. On September 15, 2012, Stubbs was involved in MLB history when his batted groundball was bobbled by Marlins SS Jose Reyes; that would turn out to be MLB's 500,000th error.

=== Cleveland Indians ===
Stubbs was traded to the Cleveland Indians, along with Trevor Bauer of the Arizona Diamondbacks in a three-team deal that sent Shin-Soo Choo to the Reds, among other players. On January 17, 2013, Stubbs avoided arbitration with the Indians by signing a one-year, $2.825 million deal with $50,000 in performance bonuses.

=== Colorado Rockies ===
On December 18, 2013, Stubbs was traded to the Colorado Rockies for Josh Outman. On August 17, 2014, Stubbs hit a walk-off, three-run home run against Cincinnati Reds pitcher J. J. Hoover, in game one of their double header. On January 14, 2015, Stubbs and the Rockies avoided arbitration by agreeing to a one-year deal worth $5.825 million. He was designated for assignment on August 12, 2015, and released on August 23.

=== Texas Rangers (first stint) ===
On August 24, 2015, Stubbs signed a minor league deal with the Texas Rangers. On September 1, he was called up to the majors. For the season, he had the highest strikeout percentage against left-handed pitchers (45.3%).

On March 29, 2016, Stubbs was released.

=== Atlanta Braves ===
The Atlanta Braves signed Stubbs to a minor league contract on March 30, 2016. The team purchased his contract on April 2. He was designated for assignment on May 2.

=== Texas Rangers (second stint) ===
Stubbs signed with the Rangers on May 7, 2016. He was designated for assignment on August 25. Stubbs rejected an outright assignment and was released.

=== Baltimore Orioles ===
On August 31, 2016, Stubbs was claimed off of release waivers by the Baltimore Orioles. He elected free agency after the season on November 3.

=== San Francisco Giants ===
On April 24, 2017, Stubbs' contract was purchased by the Giants and was later promoted to the active roster. Stubbs was designated for assignment on May 6, 2017.

=== Third stint with Texas ===
On May 16, 2017, Stubbs signed a minor league deal with the Rangers. He was immediately assigned to the Round Rock Express. He was released on August 30.

== Personal life ==
Stubbs resides with his wife Brooke, a physician with a private practice called Rooted Femme, in Austin, Texas they have two young children. He is a vice president for a real estate insurance company in the city.
