= Atlanta High School (Texas) =

Location
- 106 West Main Street; Atlanta, Texas 75551; United States
- Coordinates: 33°07′20″N 94°08′44″W

Information
- Type: Public high school
- School district: Atlanta Independent School District
- Principal: Nancy Rinehart
- Teaching staff: 50.67 (on an FTE basis)
- Grades: 9–12
- Enrollment: 503 (2023–2024)
- Student to teacher ratio: 9.93
- Colors: Maroon; White
- Athletics conference: UIL Class 3A
- Mascot: Rabbits / Lady Rabbs
- Yearbook: Maroon
- Website: ahs.atlisd.net

Atlanta High School is a public high school located in Atlanta, Texas, US. It is classified as a 3A school by the University Interscholastic League (UIL). It is part of the Atlanta Independent School District located in northeast Cass County which shares a border with the Queen City Independent School District. For the 2023–2024 school year, the school was given a "B" by the Texas Education Agency. The school is most recently known for its first in state for the short film UIL competition in Austin.

== Athletics ==
The Atlanta Rabbits compete in the following sports:

- Baseball
- Basketball
- Cross Country
- Football
- Golf
- Powerlifting
- Soccer
- Softball
- Tennis
- Track and Field
- Volleyball

=== State Titles ===
Atlanta (UIL)

- Baseball -
  - 1998(3A)
- Football -
  - 2003(3A)
- Boys Track -
  - 1989(3A), 1997(3A), 2002(3A), 2003(3A), 2004(3A), 2017 (4A)

=== State Finalists ===
Atlanta (UIL)

- Football -
  - 1994(3A)

Atlanta Pruitt (PVIL)

- Basketball -
  - 1951(PVIL-1A)

== Band ==
Atlanta High School proudly showcases the 'Big Bad Band from Rabbitland'. The band most recently placed 2nd at the 2024 3A State Marching Contest. The band has made multiple appearances at the UIL Texas State Marching Contest dating back to the early 1980s. The band has a membership of 160 students grades 9-12 and over 425 students in grades 6–12.

== Notable alumni ==
- Derrick Blaylock – professional football player (2002–2006)
- Ellen DeGeneres (1976), comedienne and actress
- Phil Epps – professional football player (1982–1989)
- Rickey Hatley – professional football player (2017)
- Randy Jackson – professional football player (1972–1974)
- Joseph Strickland (1977) – Bishop of the Roman Catholic Diocese of Tyler (2012–2023)
- Drew Stubbs – professional baseball player (2009–2017)
- Ted Thompson – professional football player (1975–1984)
- Linda Rowe Thomas – professional artist designer (1984–1988)
