= Edd Hargett =

American football player (born 1947)

No. 14, 10, 22
- Position: Quarterback

Personal information
- Born: June 26, 1947 (age 79); Marietta, Texas, U.S.
- Listed height: 5 ft 11 in (1.80 m)
- Listed weight: 185 lb (84 kg)

Career information
- High school: Linden-Kildare (Linden, Texas)
- College: Texas A&M (1965-1968)
- NFL draft: 1969: 16th round, 397th overall pick

Career history
- New Orleans Saints (1969–1972); Houston Oilers (1973); Detroit Lions (1974)*; The Hawaiians (1974); Shreveport Steamer (1975)
- * Offseason or practice squad member only

Awards and highlights
- 2× First-team All-SWC (1967, 1968)

Career NFL statistics
- Passing attempts: 437
- Passing completions: 205
- Completion percentage: 46.9%
- TD–INT: 11–10
- Passing yards: 2,727
- Passer rating: 66
- Stats at Pro Football Reference

Edward Eugene Hargett (born June 26, 1947) is an American former professional football player who was a quarterback in the National Football League (NFL). He played college football for the Texas A&M Aggies. He played in the NFL for the New Orleans Saints and Houston Oilers. He later played for the Shreveport Steamer of the World Football League (WFL).

Hargett passed for 5379 yards in his three-year career (1966–68) at Texas A&M University. This was a Texas A&M passing record at the time, eclipsed first by Kevin Murray in 1986. He at one time held the A&M all-time record for most total yards in one game (418 against SMU in 1968), a record currently held (as of 2012) by Johnny Manziel. Hargett directed the Aggies to the Southwest Conference championships in 1967 and a win in the Cotton Bowl over Alabama and former Texas A&M coach Bear Bryant.

Hargett was an honor student in electrical engineering at Texas A&M and later served as the manager of the Houston County Electric Co-op in Crockett, Texas.

In 1985, Hargett ran unsuccessfully as a Republican in a special election for the United States House of Representatives, having secured the support of such party leaders as former state Republican chairman Chet Upham. Hargett lost the race to the Democrat Jim Chapman of Sulphur Springs. The vacancy occurred when U.S. Representative Sam B. Hall, Jr., of Marshall resigned to accept a federal judicial appointment from U.S. President Ronald W. Reagan. Hargett had led the field in the all-party primary, with 42 percent of the vote. However, in the runoff election, he lost to Chapman by just over 1,900 votes. This would be as close as the GOP would get to winning this east Texas district until Louie Gohmert won it in 2004.

In 1986, the Republican Party again picked Hargett to run in another special election, this time for a recently vacated seat in the Texas Senate. This time, Hargett lost to Harrison County Judge Richard Anderson, who won 14 out of 15 counties in the Senate district, including Hargett's home county, Cass.

== College career ==
Recruited by Texas A&M out of Linden-Kildare High School in Linden, Texas, Hargett became the Aggies starting quarterback in 1966, under Head Coach Gene Stallings. Texas A & M stumbled that season, ending the season with a 4-5-1 record, but Hargett completed 132 passes out of 265 attempts for 1,532 yards with 11 touchdowns versus 19 interceptions. The following season, Texas A & M improved to 7–4 overall, and Hargett directed the team to a 20–16 win in the Cotton Bowl over the Alabama Crimson Tide, coached by Bear Bryant and quarterbacked by Ken Stabler. That season would turn out to be the highlight of Hargett's college career, as he led the SWC with 14 touchdown passes. The following season, the Aggies regressed to a 3–7 record, and thus did not qualify to appear in a bowl game. When Hargett finished his college career, he'd passed for 5,379 yards and 41 touchdown passes.

== Pro career ==
The New Orleans Saints made Hargett their 16th round draft selection in the 1969 NFL draft. Hargett made the team as a rookie and was the back-up to veteran Billy Kilmer. The Saints, coached by former Rams star Tom Fears, had been an expansion team a few years prior, and had yet to have a winning season. Hargett only saw action as a back-up, coming in for relief for Kilmer as the Saints could only muster a 5–9 record. Hargett would finally make the first start of his NFL career during the 1970 season. Hargett drew the start against the St. Louis Cardinals. In the fourth quarter, Hargett hit wide receiver Dave Parks for an 18-yard strike for Hargett's first touchdown pass. Tom Dempsey kicked the extra point to tie the score, 17-17. However, Cardinals quarterback Jim Hart directed a drive that ended with the game winning score to tight end Jackie Smith. The Saints fell 24–17, dropping their record to 1–3. Hargett would start the next three games for the Saints, going 0-2-1 during that stretch.

The following season saw several changes for the Saints. Starting quarterback Billy Kilmer was traded away to the Washington Redskins, Tom Fears was out as head coach, replaced by assistant J.D. Roberts. Hargett hoped to be named the starting quarterback, but right behind him was a rookie whom the Saints drafted in the first round out of Mississippi named Archie Manning. Manning won the job out of camp, and Hargett would not see the field until week nine, when he got his first win as a pro quarterback, a 26–20 victory over the San Francisco 49ers. Hargett would start three of the following four games, losing each start. 1972 would be a tough season for Hargett, as Manning started all 14 games and Hargett did not appear in a single game. On March 23, 1973, The Saints worked out a deal with the Houston Oilers. The Saints agreed to trade tight end Dave Parks, Linebacker Torn Stincic and Hargett to Houston in exchange for quarterback Kent Nix and defensive tackle Ron Billingsly. Hargett again did not appear in a game as a third-string quarterback behind Dan Pastorini and Lynn Dickey. He was even told by coaches to show up to practice and on participate with the team, knowing he wouldn't be in the team. Hoping to salvage his pro career, Hargett signed with the newly formed World Football League, which played football during the Spring. Assigned to The Hawaiians, Hargett found himself splitting time with NFL castoffs Randy Johnson and Norris Weese. The following season, Hargett was finally a starting quarterback again, this time for the WFL's Shreveport Steamer. Hargett beat out Bubba Wyche and D.C. Nobles for the job. Hargett led Sherevport to a 5–7, but the WFL, which was losing money, went bankrupt midway through the season and folded.

== Political career ==
In November 2017, Hargett was appointed to be the Texas State Director of Rural Development.
