= Marietta, Texas =

- Town
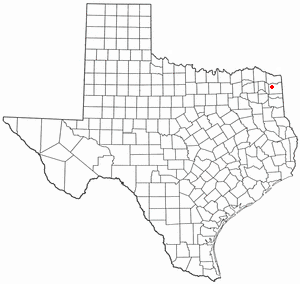
- Location of Marietta, Texas

- Coordinates: 33°10′25″N 94°32′33″W
- Country: United States
- State: Texas
- County: Cass

Area
  - Total: 0.58 sq mi (1.50 km^{2})
  - Land: 0.58 sq mi (1.50 km^{2})
  - Water: 0 sq mi (0.00 km^{2})
- Elevation: 351 ft (107 m)

Population (2020)
  - Total: 115
  - Density: 199/sq mi (76.7/km^{2})
- Time zone: UTC-6 (Central (CST))
  - Summer (DST): UTC-5 (CDT)
- ZIP code: 75566
- Area codes: 903, 430
- FIPS code: 48-46668
- GNIS feature ID: 2412956

Marietta is a town in Cass County, Texas, United States, incorporated in 1963. The population was 134 at the 2010 census, up from 112 at the 2000 census; in 2020, its population was 115.

== Geography ==
Marietta is located in northwestern Cass County. It is 12 miles (19 km) west of Douglassville, 9 miles (14 km) east of Naples, and 16 miles (26 km) northwest of Linden, the Cass County seat. According to the United States Census Bureau, the town of Marietta has a total area of 0.58 square miles (1.5 km^{2}), all land.

== Demographics ==
Historical population
Census	Pop.	Note	%±
1970	177		—
1980	169		−4.5%
1990	161		−4.7%
2000	112		−30.4%
2010	134		19.6%
2020	115		−14.2%
U.S. Decennial Census

As of the census of 2000, there were 134 people, 58 households, and 33 families residing in the town. The population density was 194.0 inhabitants per square mile (74.9/km^{2}). There were 75 housing units at an average density of 129.9 per square mile (50.2/km^{2}). The racial makeup of the town was 99.11% White and 0.89% African American.

There were 58 households, out of which 13.8% had children under the age of 18 living with them, 50.0% were married couples living together, 3.4% had a female householder with no husband present, and 43.1% were non-families. 41.4% of all households were made up of individuals, and 25.9% had someone living alone who was 65 years of age or older. The average household size was 1.93 and the average family size was 2.55.

In the town, the population was spread out, with 11.6% under the age of 18, 5.4% from 18 to 24, 17.9% from 25 to 44, 31.3% from 45 to 64, and 33.9% who were 65 years of age or older. The median age was 56 years. For every 100 females, there were 86.7 males. For every 100 females age 18 and over, there were 80.0 males.

The median income for a household in the town was $24,028, and the median income for a family was $28,750. Males had a median income of $17,500 versus $20,500 for females. The per capita income for the town was $12,773. There were 11.5% of families and 11.1% of the population living below the poverty line, including no under eighteens and 25.5% of those over 64.

== Education ==
Marietta is served by the Pewitt Consolidated Independent School District. Prior to September 1, 2008, it was served by the Marietta Independent School District.

Since Marietta is in Pewitt CISD, its community college is Northeast Texas Community College.

== Town government ==
Marietta is a Type B General Law Municipality, with a mayor, a five person city council and a city manager.

== Notable person ==
- Edd Hargett, American football player
