= Douglassville, Texas =

- Town
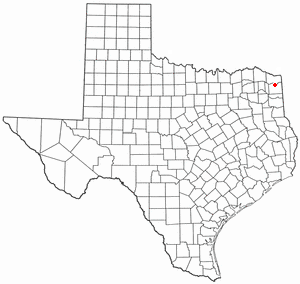
- Location of Douglassville, Texas

- Coordinates: 33°11′30″N 94°21′07″W
- Country: United States
- State: Texas
- County: Cass

Government
  - Type: Council-Manager

Area
  - Total: 6.32 sq mi (16.38 km^{2})
  - Land: 6.32 sq mi (16.38 km^{2})
  - Water: 0 sq mi (0.00 km^{2})
- Elevation: 381 ft (116 m)

Population (2020)
  - Total: 211
  - Density: 33.4/sq mi (12.9/km^{2})
- Time zone: UTC-6 (Central (CST))
  - Summer (DST): UTC-5 (CDT)
- ZIP code: 75560
- Area codes: 903, 430
- FIPS code: 48-21112
- GNIS feature ID: 2412445

Douglassville is a town in Cass County, Texas, United States. The population was 229 at the 2010 census, up from 175 at the 2000 census. In 2020, its population was 211.

== Geography ==
Douglassville is located in northern Cass County at the intersection of Texas Highways 8 and 77. Highway 8 leads north 10 miles (16 km) to Maud and south 13 miles (21 km) to Linden, the Cass County seat, while Highway 77 leads southeast 13 miles (21 km) to Atlanta and west 19 miles (31 km) to Naples.

According to the United States Census Bureau, Douglassville has a total area of 6.3 square miles (16.4 km^{2}), all land.

== Demographics ==
Historical population
Census	Pop.	Note	%±
1960	172		—
1970	282		64.0%
1980	228		−19.1%
1990	192		−15.8%
2000	175		−8.9%
2010	229		30.9%
2020	211		−7.9%
U.S. Decennial Census

As of the census of 2000, there were 175 people, 76 households, and 52 families residing in the town. The population density was 27.7 inhabitants per square mile (10.7/km^{2}). There were 87 housing units at an average density of 13.8 per square mile (5.3/km^{2}). The racial makeup of the town was 83.43% White, 15.43% African American, 0.57% Native American, and 0.57% from two or more races. Hispanic or Latino of any race were 0.57% of the population.

There were 76 households, out of which 27.6% had children under the age of 18 living with them, 57.9% were married couples living together, 7.9% had a female householder with no husband present, and 30.3% were non-families. 30.3% of all households were made up of individuals, and 15.8% had someone living alone who was 65 years of age or older. The average household size was 2.30 and the average family size was 2.85.

In the town, the population was spread out, with 25.1% under the age of 18, 3.4% from 18 to 24, 29.7% from 25 to 44, 20.6% from 45 to 64, and 21.1% who were 65 years of age or older. The median age was 41 years. For every 100 females, there were 96.6 males. For every 100 females age 18 and over, there were 87.1 males.

The median income for a household in the town was $37,188, and the median income for a family was $48,750. Males had a median income of $27,250 versus $26,875 for females. The per capita income for the town was $15,992. About 3.7% of families and 8.9% of the population were below the poverty line, including 15.5% of those under the age of eighteen and 3.8% of those 65 or over.

== Education ==
Douglassville is served by the Atlanta Independent School District. The majority of Cass County, including Atlanta ISD, is in the service area of Texarkana College.

Previously Atlanta ISD operated the Douglas School, a K-12 school. In 1970 the new Atlanta High School was to open, and Douglas School was to become a K-8 school.
