= Atlanta State Park =

State park in Texas, United States

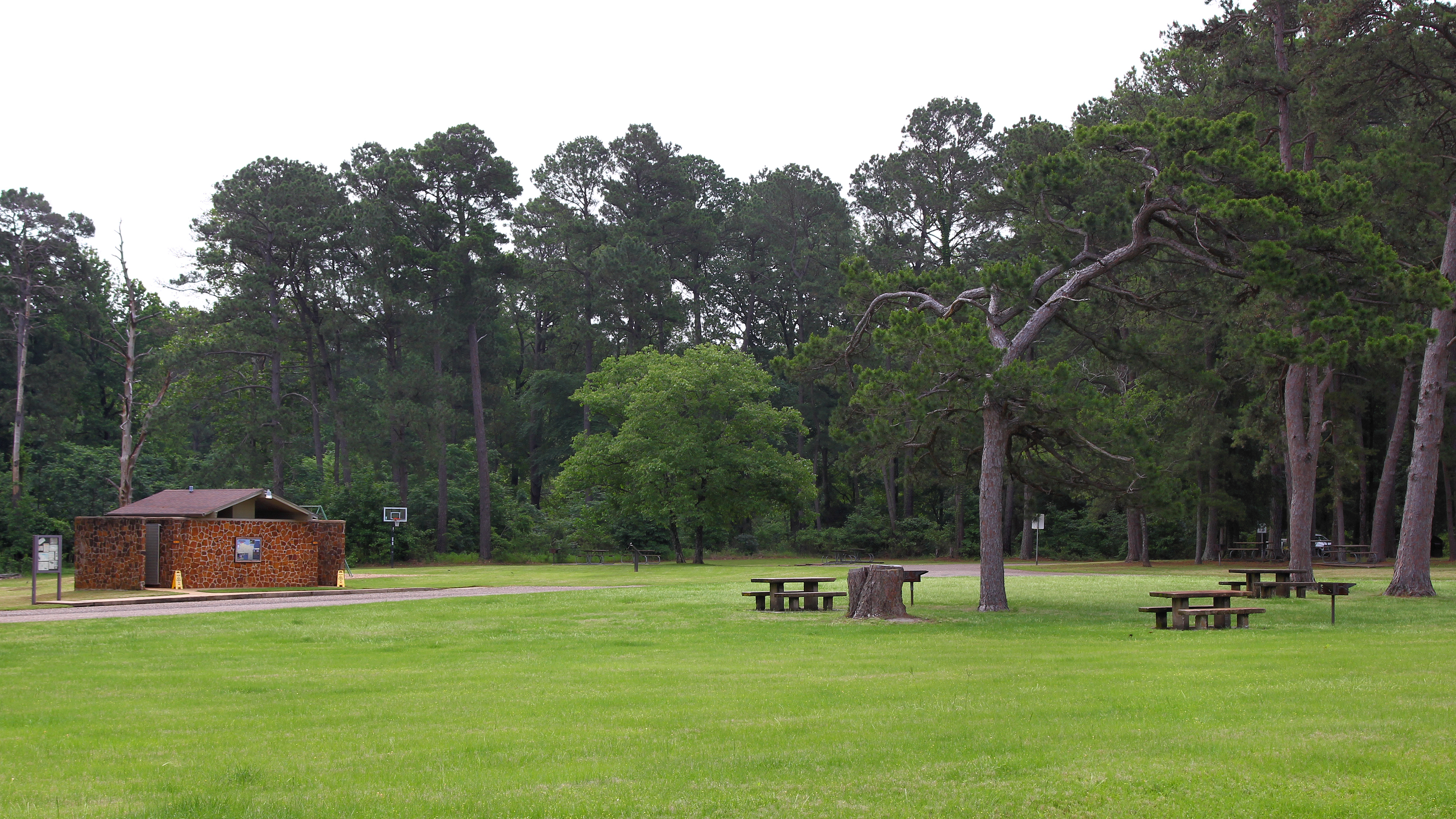
- A day use area in Atlanta State Park

- Location within Texas Location within the United States
- Location: Cass County, Texas, United States
- Nearest city: Atlanta
- Coordinates: 33°13′55″N 94°14′58″W
- Area: 1,475-acre (597 ha)
- Established: 1954
- Visitors: 44,819 (in 2025)
- Governing body: Texas Parks and Wildlife Department
- Website: Official site

Atlanta State Park is a 1,475-acre (597 ha) densely forested state park in northern Cass County, Texas, United States ten miles northwest of Atlanta, Texas off Farm to Market Road 1154. The park opened in 1954. It is located on the south shore of Wright Patman Lake in and is managed by the Texas Parks and Wildlife Department.

== History ==
In past centuries, the Caddo Indians settled in this area and worked the land as farmers. Many pioneers traveled across the area to use the ferry that crossed the Sulphur River. The State of Texas acquired the land for Atlanta State Park in 1954 under a long-term lease with the Department of the Army.

In spring 2016 Wright Patman Lake flooded the park and destroyed bathrooms and the amphitheatre. Texas Parks and Wildlife closed the park for more than two months. An old-growth pine forest was inundated with ten feet of water that killed many of the trees. Reforestation efforts are in progress with trees that can better tolerate flooding.

== Nature ==
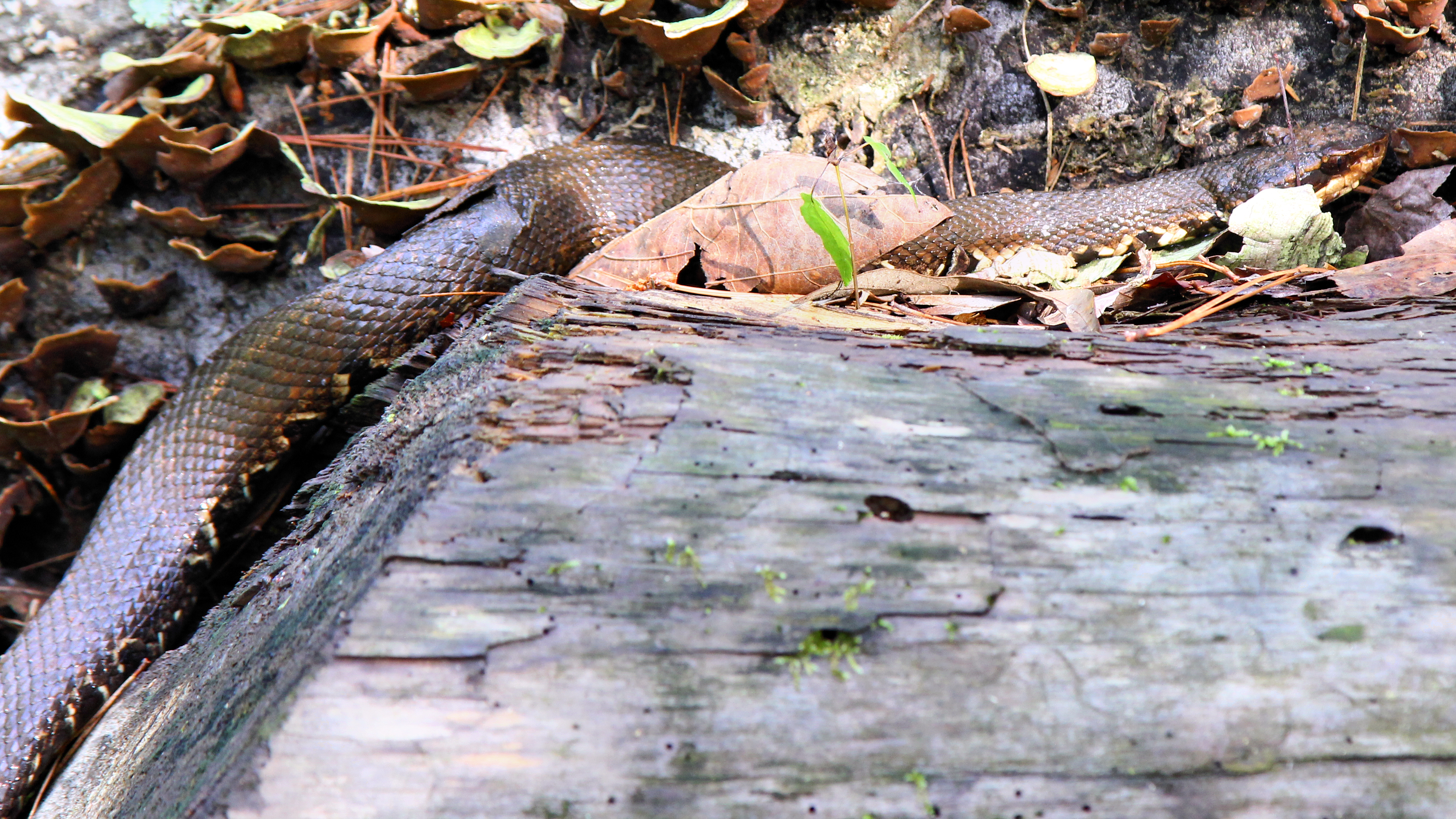
A northern cottonmouth

=== Animals ===
Visitors can see woodland birds like the pine warbler, pileated woodpecker, red-headed woodpecker and brown-headed nuthatch. There are also waterfowl such as American white pelican and double-crested cormorant. White-tailed deer, Mexican long-nosed armadillo, grey fox, eastern gray squirrel, northern cottonmouth eastern copperhead, and timber rattlesnake are some of the land animals in the park.

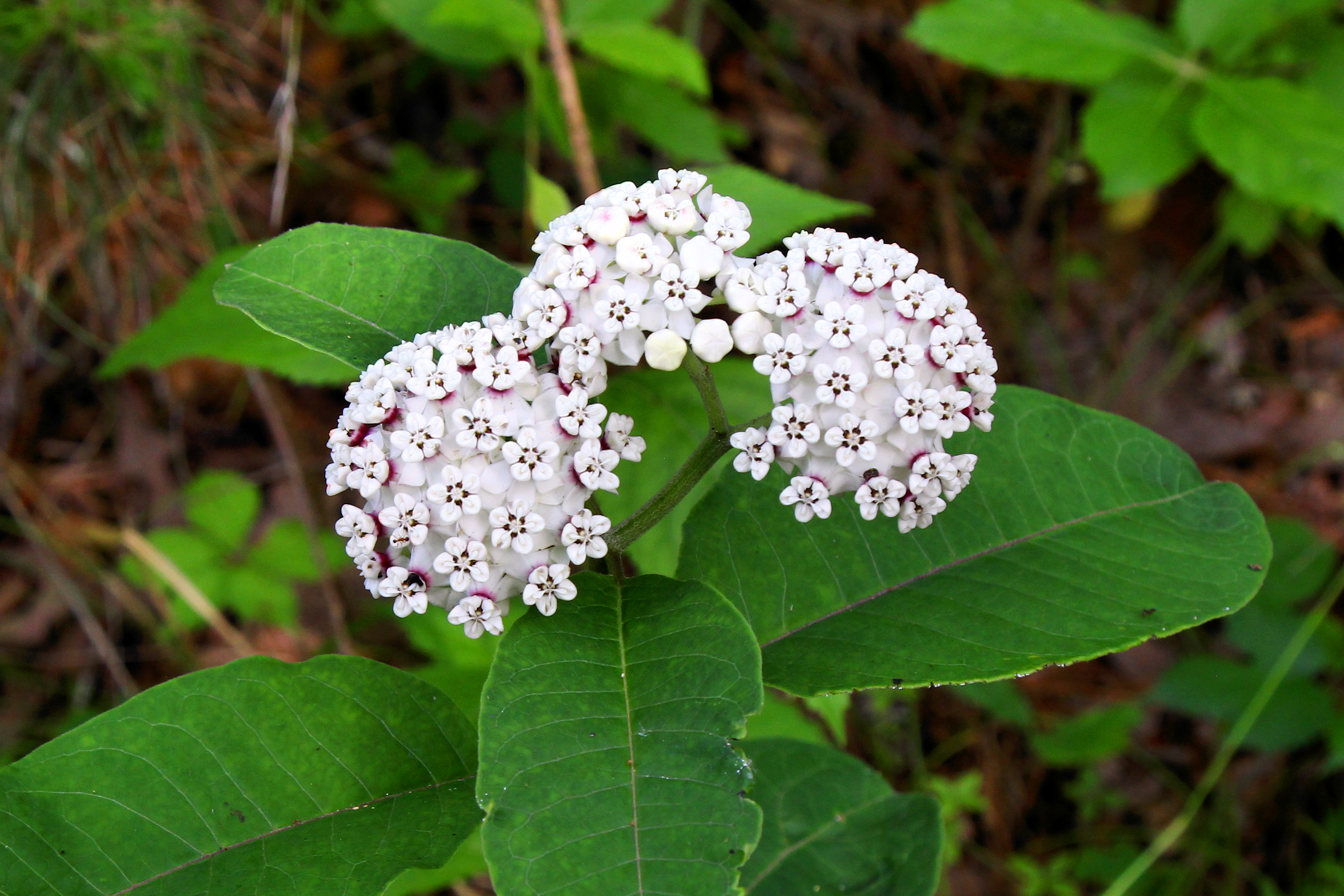
Redring milkweed

=== Plants ===
Trees dominate the landscape of Atlanta State Park. Loblolly and shortleaf pine, white oak, black hickory, mockernut hickory, American sweetgum, eastern redbud and flowering dogwood grow in the park. American beautyberry, wild grape, farkleberry, redring milkweed and poison ivy are found in the understory.

== Activities ==
Atlanta State Park provides access to Wright Patman Lake for boating and fishing and has a sandy beach area for swimming. Picnic and overnight camping areas are available. The park has 4.5-mile (7.2 km) of hiking trails.

== See also ==
- List of Texas state parks
