= Bivins, Texas =

Unincorporated community in Texas, US

Coordinates: 33°1′10″N 94°11′57″W

Bivins is an unincorporated community and census designated place (CDP) in eastern Cass County, Texas, United States. It lies along State Highway 43, east of the city of Linden, the county seat of Cass County. Its elevation is 318 feet (97 m), and it is located at . Although Bivins is unincorporated, it has a post office, with the ZIP code of 75555. As of the 2020 census, Bivins had a population of 153.

It is within the Atlanta Independent School District. The majority of Cass County, including Atlanta ISD, is in the service area of Texarkana College.

== Demographics ==
Historical population
Census	Pop.	Note	%±
2020	153		—
U.S. Decennial Census; 1850–1900 1910; 1920 1930 1940; 1950 1960 1970; 1980 1990 2000; 2010 2020

Bivins first appeared as a census designated place in the 2020 U.S. census.

=== 2020 Census ===
Bivins CDP, Texas – Racial and ethnic composition Note: the US Census treats Hispanic/Latino as an ethnic category. This table excludes Latinos from the racial categories and assigns them to a separate category. Hispanics/Latinos may be of any race.
Race / Ethnicity (NH = Non-Hispanic)	Pop 2020	% 2020
White alone (NH)	111	72.55%
Black or African American alone (NH)	22	14.38%
Native American or Alaska Native alone (NH)	1	0.65%
Asian alone (NH)	1	0.65%
Native Hawaiian or Pacific Islander alone (NH)	0	0.00%
Other race alone (NH)	0	0.00%
Mixed race or Multiracial (NH)	8	5.23%
Hispanic or Latino (any race)	10	6.54%
Total	153	100.00%
