= Maud, Texas =

- City
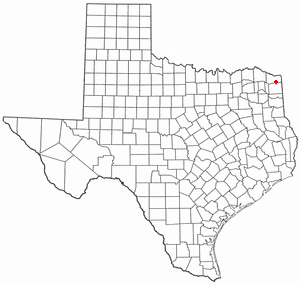
- Location of Maud, Texas

- Coordinates: 33°19′48″N 94°20′46″W
- Country: United States
- State: Texas
- County: Bowie

Area
  - Total: 1.49 sq mi (3.86 km^{2})
  - Land: 1.49 sq mi (3.86 km^{2})
  - Water: 0 sq mi (0.00 km^{2})
- Elevation: 302 ft (92 m)

Population (2020)
  - Total: 977
  - Density: 699.1/sq mi (269.91/km^{2})
- Time zone: UTC-6 (Central (CST))
  - Summer (DST): UTC-5 (CDT)
- ZIP code: 75567
- Area codes: 903, 430
- FIPS code: 48-47088
- GNIS feature ID: 2411051
- Website: cityofmaudtexas.com

Maud is a city in Bowie County, Texas, United States, within the Texarkana metropolitan area. According to the 2020 U.S. census, it had a population of 977.

== History ==
Maud is situated by the St. Louis Southwestern Railway, near U.S. Highway 67 in southern Bowie County. The territory around Maud, known before the Republic of Texas era as the Red River Country, was among the earliest settled areas, but Spanish claims to the land, outlaws from the Neutral Ground, and general lawlessness discouraged extensive development. Before the city of Maud was established, the historic Trammel Trace road went just south of the city, where the crossing of the Sulphur River was made via Epperson's Ferry.

After the railroad reached the site in 1870, a community gradually began to emerge. The town was named for Maud Knapp, daughter of Samuel D. Knapp, the first postmaster and the donor of land for the townsite. A post office opened in 1881, closed the next year, then reopened in 1893. By 1910, the population of the town had reached 300, and by 1940 it had grown to 750. During World War II, the Red River Army Depot and the Lone Star Army Ammunition Plant were built 6 miles (10 km) north of the community. These two facilities provided jobs for many Maud citizens. In 1982, Maud had eleven rated businesses and an estimated population of 1,059. The two military installations remained the largest employers of Maud residents. In 1990, the community population was 1,049.

== Geography ==
Maud is located in southern Bowie County. U.S. Route 67 passes through the center of town, leading northeast 18 miles (29 km) to Texarkana and southwest 43 miles (69 km) to Mount Pleasant. Texas State Highway 8 leads south from Maud 23 miles (37 km) to Linden and north 13 miles (21 km) to New Boston. The city is 4 miles (6 km) north of Wright Patman Lake, a reservoir on the Sulphur River. According to the United States Census Bureau, the city of Maud has a total area of 1.5 square miles (3.9 km^{2}), all land.

=== Climate ===
The climate in this area is characterized by hot, humid summers and generally mild to cool winters. According to the Köppen Climate Classification system, Maud has a humid subtropical climate, abbreviated "Cfa" on climate maps.

== Demographics ==
Historical population
| Census | Pop. | Note | %± |
|---|---|---|---|
| 1950 | 713 | | — |
| 1960 | 915 | | 28.3% |
| 1970 | 1,107 | | 21.0% |
| 1980 | 1,059 | | −4.3% |
| 1990 | 1,049 | | −0.9% |
| 2000 | 1,028 | | −2.0% |
| 2010 | 1,056 | | 2.7% |
| 2020 | 977 | | −7.5% |
U.S. Decennial Census

From the 1950 United States census to 2020, Maud has experienced relative growth and decline; with 713 residents in 1950, its population grew to a historic 1,107 in 1970; in 2020, however, its population declined to a further 977 residents.

=== 2020 census ===
As of the 2020 census, Maud had a population of 977. The median age was 37.4 years, 28.2% of residents were under the age of 18, and 15.6% of residents were 65 years of age or older.

For every 100 females there were 104.4 males, and for every 100 females age 18 and over there were 96.9 males age 18 and over.

0.0% of residents lived in urban areas, while 100.0% lived in rural areas.

There were 370 households in Maud, of which 38.1% had children under the age of 18 living in them. Of all households, 40.3% were married-couple households, 23.5% were households with a male householder and no spouse or partner present, and 29.7% were households with a female householder and no spouse or partner present. About 31.4% of all households were made up of individuals and 14.8% had someone living alone who was 65 years of age or older.

There were 433 housing units, of which 14.5% were vacant. The homeowner vacancy rate was 0.8% and the rental vacancy rate was 10.2%.

Racial composition as of the 2020 census (NH = Non-Hispanic) (Note: Note: the US Census treats Hispanic/Latino as an ethnic category. This table excludes Latinos from the racial categories and assigns them to a separate category. Hispanics/Latinos can be of any race.)
| Race | Number | Percent |
|---|---|---|
| White | 855 | 87.5% |
| Black or African American | 43 | 4.4% |
| American Indian and Alaska Native | 6 | 0.6% |
| Asian | 2 | 0.2% |
| Native Hawaiian and Other Pacific Islander | 1 | 0.1% |
| Some other race | 12 | 1.2% |
| Two or more races | 58 | 5.9% |
| Hispanic or Latino (of any race) | 53 | 5.4% |

=== 2020 American Community Survey ===
The median household income for residents in the city was $46,447, and the mean income was $54,979.

=== 2010 census ===
At the 2010 U.S. census, there were 1,056 people in Maud; in 2010, its racial and ethnic makeup was 90.76% White American, 7.59% Black or African American, 0.58% American Indian or Alaska Native, 0.10% Asian, 0.10% from other races and ethnicities, and 0.88% from two or more races and ethnicities. Hispanic or Latino Americans of any race constituted 1.36% of the population.

== Education ==
Maud is served by the Maud Independent School District.
