= Cass County, Texas =

County in Texas, United States

- County
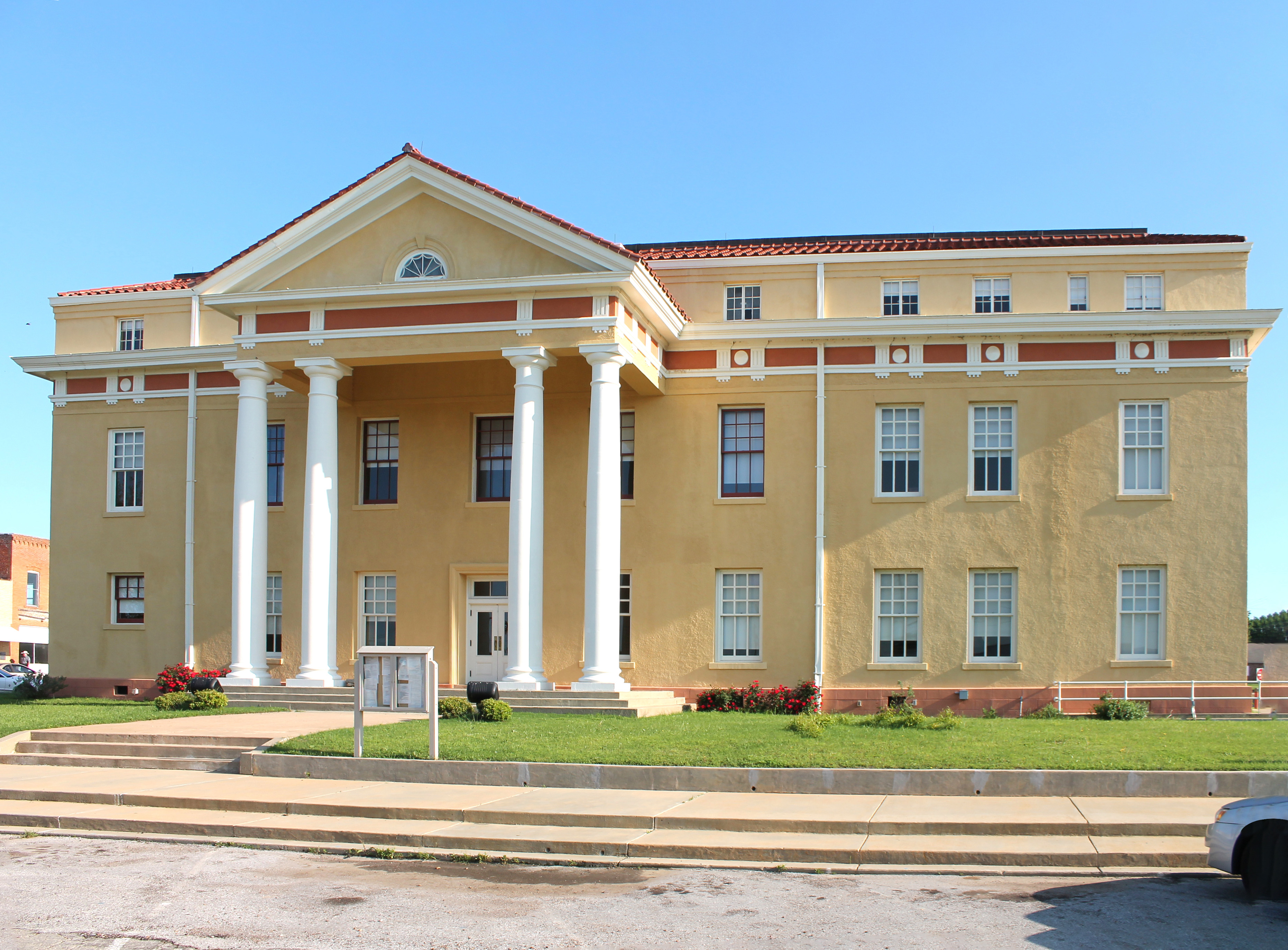
- Cass County Courthouse in Linden

- Location within the U.S. state of Texas
- Coordinates: 33°04′N 94°21′W
- Country: United States
- State: Texas
- Founded: 1846
- Named for: Lewis Cass
- Seat: Linden
- Largest city: Atlanta

Area
  - Total: 960 sq mi (2,500 km^{2})
  - Land: 937 sq mi (2,430 km^{2})
  - Water: 23 sq mi (60 km^{2}) 2.4%

Population (2020)
  - Total: 28,454
  - Estimate (2025): 28,651 ▲
  - Density: 30.4/sq mi (11.7/km^{2})
- Time zone: UTC−6 (Central)
  - Summer (DST): UTC−5 (CDT)
- Congressional district: 1st
- Website: www.co.cass.tx.us

Cass County is a county located in the U.S. state of Texas. As of the 2020 census, its population was 28,454. The county seat is Linden. The county was named for Lewis Cass, a United States Senator representing Michigan who favored the U.S. annexation of Texas in the mid-19th century.

== History ==
Cass County was formed in 1846 from sections of Bowie County and houses some outskirts of Texarkana. It was named for Lewis Cass, a U.S. Senator from Michigan who had favored the annexation of Texas to the United States and became the first presidential candidate to win the state.

The county was originally developed by planters for cotton plantations. By 1860, the majority of the population were enslaved African Americans. After the war, freedmen worked largely as tenant farmers and sharecroppers into the early 20th century. Black residents faced violence and discrimination in Cass County, which was the location of nine lynchings, the fifth-highest total among Texas' 254 counties.

From 1861 to 1871, this county was known as Davis County, after Jefferson Davis, the president of the Confederate States of America, as opposed to Jeff Davis County in West Texas.

== Geography ==
According to the U.S. Census Bureau, the county has a total area of 960 square miles (2,500 km^{2}), of which 937 square miles (2,430 km^{2}) is land and 23 square miles (60 km^{2}) (2.4%) is water.

Cass County, Texas is one of only three counties in Texas to border two other U.S. states (the others are Bowie and Dallam counties). Cass County forms part of the tripoint of Texas-Arkansas-Louisiana.

=== Adjacent counties and parish ===
- Bowie County (north)
- Miller County, Arkansas (northeast)
- Caddo Parish, Louisiana (southeast)
- Marion County (south)
- Morris County (west)

=== Major highways ===
- U.S. Highway 59
  - Interstate 369 is currently under construction and will follow the current route of U.S. 59 in most places.
- U.S. Highway 67
- State Highway 8
- State Highway 11
- State Highway 43
- State Highway 77
- State Highway 155
- Loop 236
- Farm to Market Road 248
- Farm to Market Road 250

=== State protected area ===
- Atlanta State Park

== Communities ==
=== Cities ===
- Atlanta
- Hughes Springs (small part in Morris County)
- Linden (county seat)
- Queen City

=== Towns ===
- Avinger
- Bloomburg
- Domino
- Douglassville
- Marietta

=== Census-designated places ===
- Bivins
- McLeod

=== Unincorporated communities ===
- Almira
- Antioch
- Bryans Mill
- Carterville
- Cass
- Cornett
- Cusseta
- Dalton
- Fairview
- Gum Springs
- Huffins
- Kildare
- Lanark
- Lanier
- New Colony
- Nickleberry
- O'Farrell
- Patman
- Pruitt
- Red Hill
- Roach
- Smyrna
- Springdale
- Three States (extends into Arkansas and Louisiana)

== Demographics ==
Historical population
Census	Pop.	Note	%±
1850	4,991		—
1860	8,411		68.5%
1870	8,875		5.5%
1880	16,724		88.4%
1890	22,554		34.9%
1900	22,841		1.3%
1910	27,587		20.8%
1920	30,041		8.9%
1930	30,030		0.0%
1940	33,496		11.5%
1950	26,732		−20.2%
1960	23,496		−12.1%
1970	24,133		2.7%
1980	29,430		21.9%
1990	29,982		1.9%
2000	30,438		1.5%
2010	30,464		0.1%
2020	28,454		−6.6%
2025 (est.)	28,651	▲	0.7%
U.S. Decennial Census; 1850–2010 2010–2020

=== Racial and ethnic composition ===
Cass County, Texas – Racial and ethnic composition Note: the US Census treats Hispanic/Latino as an ethnic category. This table excludes Latinos from the racial categories and assigns them to a separate category. Hispanics/Latinos may be of any race.
Race / Ethnicity (NH = Non-Hispanic)	Pop 1980	Pop 1990	Pop 2000	Pop 2010	Pop 2020	% 1980	% 1990	% 2000	% 2010	% 2020
White alone (NH)	22,661	23,464	23,542	23,522	21,028	77.00%	78.26%	77.34%	77.21%	73.90%
Black or African American alone (NH)	6,358	6,020	5,915	5,299	4,518	21.60%	20.08%	19.43%	17.39%	15.88%
Native American or Alaska Native alone (NH)	51	101	130	133	155	0.17%	0.34%	0.43%	0.44%	0.54%
Asian alone (NH)	15	23	44	89	119	0.05%	0.08%	0.14%	0.29%	0.42%
Native Hawaiian or Pacific Islander alone (NH)	x	x	4	4	10	x	x	0.01%	0.01%	0.04%
Other race alone (NH)	9	1	11	15	86	0.03%	0.00%	0.04%	0.05%	0.30%
Mixed race or Multiracial (NH)	x	x	266	349	1,202	x	x	0.87%	1.15%	4.22%
Hispanic or Latino (any race)	336	373	526	1,053	1,336	1.14%	1.24%	1.73%	3.46%	4.70%
Total	29,430	29,982	30,438	30,464	28,454	100.00%	100.00%	100.00%	100.00%	100.00%

=== 2020 census ===
As of the 2020 census, the county had a population of 28,454. The median age was 45.9 years. 21.9% of residents were under the age of 18 and 23.7% of residents were 65 years of age or older. For every 100 females there were 94.2 males, and for every 100 females age 18 and over there were 91.9 males age 18 and over.

The racial makeup of the county was 75.5% White, 16.0% Black or African American, 0.7% American Indian and Alaska Native, 0.4% Asian, <0.1% Native Hawaiian and Pacific Islander, 2.0% from some other race, and 5.4% from two or more races. Hispanic or Latino residents of any race comprised 4.7% of the population.

19.4% of residents lived in urban areas, while 80.6% lived in rural areas.

There were 11,738 households in the county, of which 28.0% had children under the age of 18 living in them. Of all households, 48.9% were married-couple households, 18.5% were households with a male householder and no spouse or partner present, and 28.5% were households with a female householder and no spouse or partner present. About 29.2% of all households were made up of individuals and 15.5% had someone living alone who was 65 years of age or older.

There were 13,870 housing units, of which 15.4% were vacant. Among occupied housing units, 75.6% were owner-occupied and 24.4% were renter-occupied. The homeowner vacancy rate was 2.1% and the rental vacancy rate was 10.7%.

=== 2010 census ===
As of the 2010 census, the county had 30,464 residents and 12,190 households, out of which 30.20% had children under the age of 18 living with them, 54.90% were married couples living together, 12.20% had a female householder with no husband present, and 29.00% were non-families; 26.40% of all households were made up of individuals, and 13.50% had someone living alone who was 65 years of age or older.

The average household size was 2.46 and the average family size was 2.95. The median income for a household in the county was $28,441, and the median income for a family was $35,623. Males had a median income of $30,906 versus $19,726 for females. The per capita income for the county was $15,777. About 14.70% of families and 17.70% of the population were below the poverty line, including 22.20% of those under age 18 and 17.90% of those age 65 or over.

== Education ==
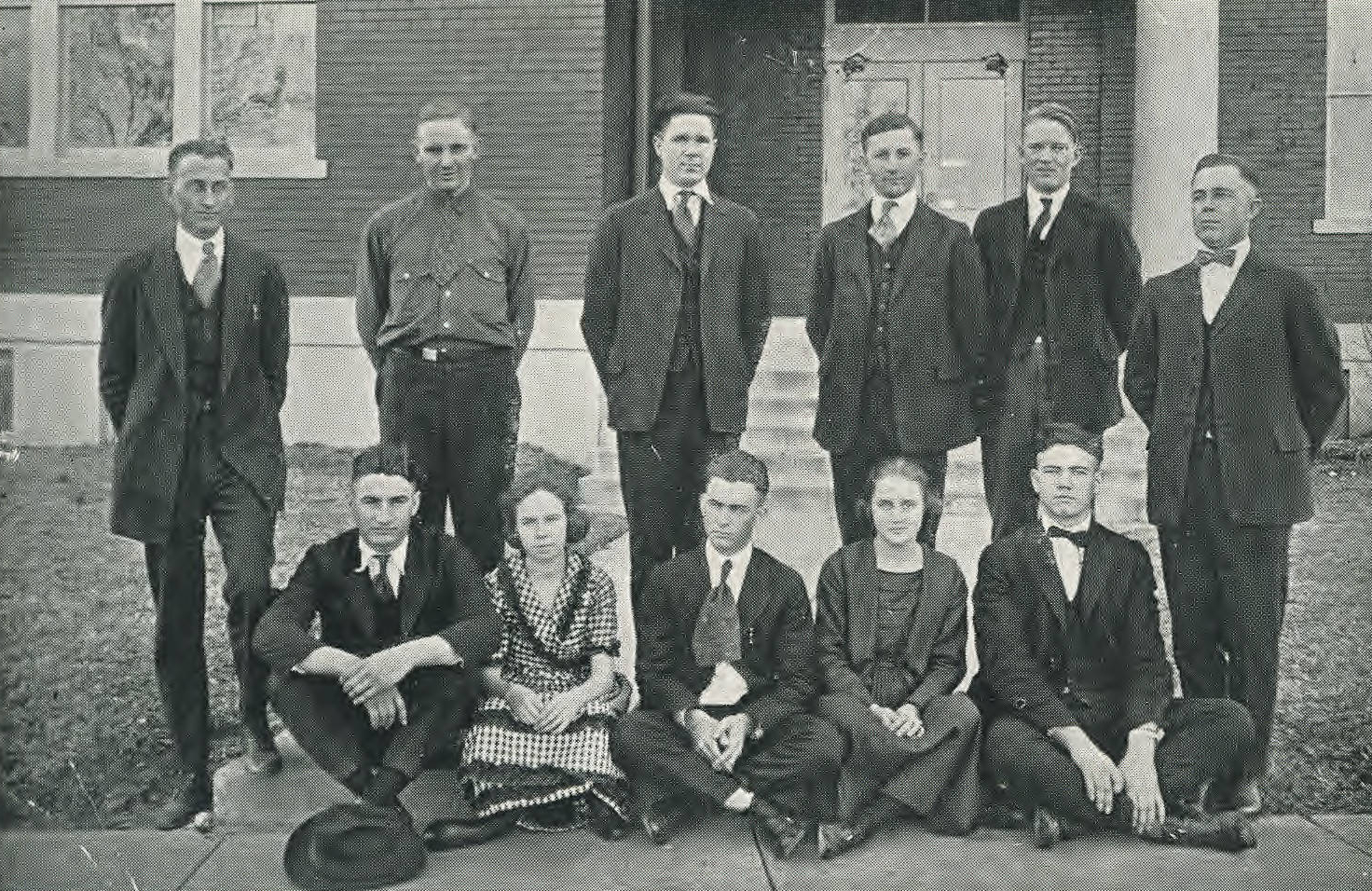
The Cass County Club at East Texas State Normal College in 1921

The following school districts serve Cass County:

- Atlanta ISD
- Avinger ISD (small portion in Marion County)
- Bloomburg ISD
- Hughes Springs ISD (small portion in Morris County)
- Linden-Kildare CISD
- McLeod ISD
- Pewitt CISD (mostly in Morris County, small portion in Titus County)
- Queen City ISD

Marietta Independent School District was formerly in operation. It consolidated into Pewitt ISD in 2008.

The majority of Cass County is in the service area of Texarkana College. Areas in Avinger ISD, Hughes Springs ISD, and Pewitt CISD within Cass County are instead assigned to Northeast Texas Community College.

== Politics ==
Cass County is located within District 1 of the Texas House of Representatives. Cass County is located within District 1 of the Texas Senate.

United States presidential election results for Cass County, Texas
Year	Republican		Democratic		Third party(ies)	
Year	No.	%	No.	%	No.	%
1912	402	20.62%	1,284	65.85%	264	13.54%
1916	707	30.27%	1,505	64.43%	124	5.31%
1920	1,446	42.57%	1,563	46.01%	388	11.42%
1924	997	31.05%	2,125	66.18%	89	2.77%
1928	1,323	43.79%	1,698	56.21%	0	0.00%
1932	224	6.67%	3,135	93.33%	0	0.00%
1936	169	6.43%	2,461	93.57%	0	0.00%
1940	454	12.68%	3,126	87.32%	0	0.00%
1944	541	14.46%	2,866	76.59%	335	8.95%
1948	457	11.72%	2,540	65.14%	902	23.13%
1952	2,502	44.17%	3,160	55.78%	3	0.05%
1956	2,970	54.91%	2,395	44.28%	44	0.81%
1960	2,322	43.89%	2,934	55.46%	34	0.64%
1964	2,681	42.61%	3,603	57.26%	8	0.13%
1968	1,930	26.26%	2,536	34.50%	2,884	39.24%
1972	5,303	72.76%	1,981	27.18%	4	0.05%
1976	3,712	41.83%	5,134	57.85%	29	0.33%
1980	4,993	46.79%	5,578	52.27%	101	0.95%
1984	6,677	56.78%	5,053	42.97%	30	0.26%
1988	5,305	47.11%	5,941	52.75%	16	0.14%
1992	3,999	34.30%	5,476	46.96%	2,185	18.74%
1996	4,066	37.51%	5,691	52.50%	1,082	9.98%
2000	6,295	57.13%	4,618	41.91%	106	0.96%
2004	7,383	61.27%	4,630	38.43%	36	0.30%
2008	8,279	69.89%	3,490	29.46%	77	0.65%
2012	8,763	74.34%	2,924	24.80%	101	0.86%
2016	9,726	78.79%	2,391	19.37%	227	1.84%
2020	11,033	79.22%	2,795	20.07%	99	0.71%
2024	11,693	82.68%	2,406	17.01%	44	0.31%

United States Senate election results for Cass County, Texas1
Year	Republican		Democratic		Third party(ies)	
Year	No.	%	No.	%	No.	%
2024	11,477	81.30%	2,457	17.40%	183	1.30%

United States Senate election results for Cass County, Texas2
Year	Republican		Democratic		Third party(ies)	
Year	No.	%	No.	%	No.	%
2020	10,796	78.16%	2,672	19.34%	345	2.50%

Texas Gubernatorial election results for Cass County
Year	Republican		Democratic		Third party(ies)	
Year	No.	%	No.	%	No.	%
2022	8,415	84.41%	1,460	14.65%	94	0.94%

== In popular culture ==
Don Henley named his 2015 album Cass County, as he had grown up here.

== See also ==
- National Register of Historic Places listings in Cass County, Texas
- Recorded Texas Historic Landmarks in Cass County
