= Naples, Texas =

- Town
- Location in Morris County and the state of Texas
- Coordinates: 33°12′11″N 94°40′40″W
- Country: United States
- State: Texas
- County: Morris County, Texas

Area
  - Total: 2.39 sq mi (6.18 km^{2})
  - Land: 2.37 sq mi (6.13 km^{2})
  - Water: 0.019 sq mi (0.05 km^{2})
- Elevation: 387 ft (118 m)

Population (2020)
  - Total: 1,387
  - Density: 586/sq mi (226/km^{2})
- Time zone: UTC-6 (Central (CST))
  - Summer (DST): UTC-5 (CDT)
- ZIP code: 75568
- Area codes: 903, 430
- FIPS code: 48-50316
- GNIS feature ID: 2411211
- Website: cityofnaplestx.com

Naples is a city in Morris County, Texas, United States. Its population was 1,387 at the 2020 census.

== Geography ==
According to the United States Census Bureau, the city has a total area of 2.4 square miles (6.2 km^{2}), of which 0.04 sq mi (0.10 km^{2}), 0.84%, is covered by water.

The climate in this area is characterized by hot, humid summers and generally mild to cool winters. According to the Köppen climate classification, Naples has a humid subtropical climate, Cfa on climate maps.

== Demographics ==
Historical population
Census	Pop.	Note	%±
1910	1,178		—
1920	887		−24.7%
1930	843		−5.0%
1940	821		−2.6%
1950	1,346		63.9%
1960	1,692		25.7%
1970	1,726		2.0%
1980	1,908		10.5%
1990	1,508		−21.0%
2000	1,410		−6.5%
2010	1,378		−2.3%
2020	1,387		0.7%
U.S. Decennial Census

=== 2020 census ===
As of the 2020 census, 1,387 people were residing in the city. The median age was 39.9 years; 25.2% of the residents were under 18 and 20.6% were 65 or older. The female/male ratio was 1:0.948 overall and 1:0.884 for 18 and over.

None of the residents lived in urban areas, while 100.0% lived in rural areas.

The census counted 540 households, including 321 families; 32.2% had children under 18 living in them, 38.1% were married-couple households, 18.7% were households with a male householder and no spouse or partner present, and 36.3% were households with a female householder and no spouse or partner present. About 32.4% of all households were made up of individuals, and 16.9% had someone living alone who was 65 or older.

The city had 652 housing units, of which 17.2% were vacant. The homeowner vacancy rate was 4.7% and the rental vacancy rate was 10.3%.

Racial composition as of the 2020 census
Race	Number	Percentage
White	850	61.3%
Black or African American	348	25.1%
American Indian and Alaska Native	15	1.1%
Asian	11	0.8%
Native Hawaiian and other Pacific Islander	3	0.2%
Some other race	47	3.4%
Two or more races	113	8.1%
Hispanic or Latino (of any race)	91	6.6%

== Local cultural events ==
The City of Naples hosts the annual Watermelon Festival on the last weekend of July.

== Education ==
The City of Naples is served by Pewitt Consolidated Independent School District.
