= Atlanta Independent School District =

School district in Texas

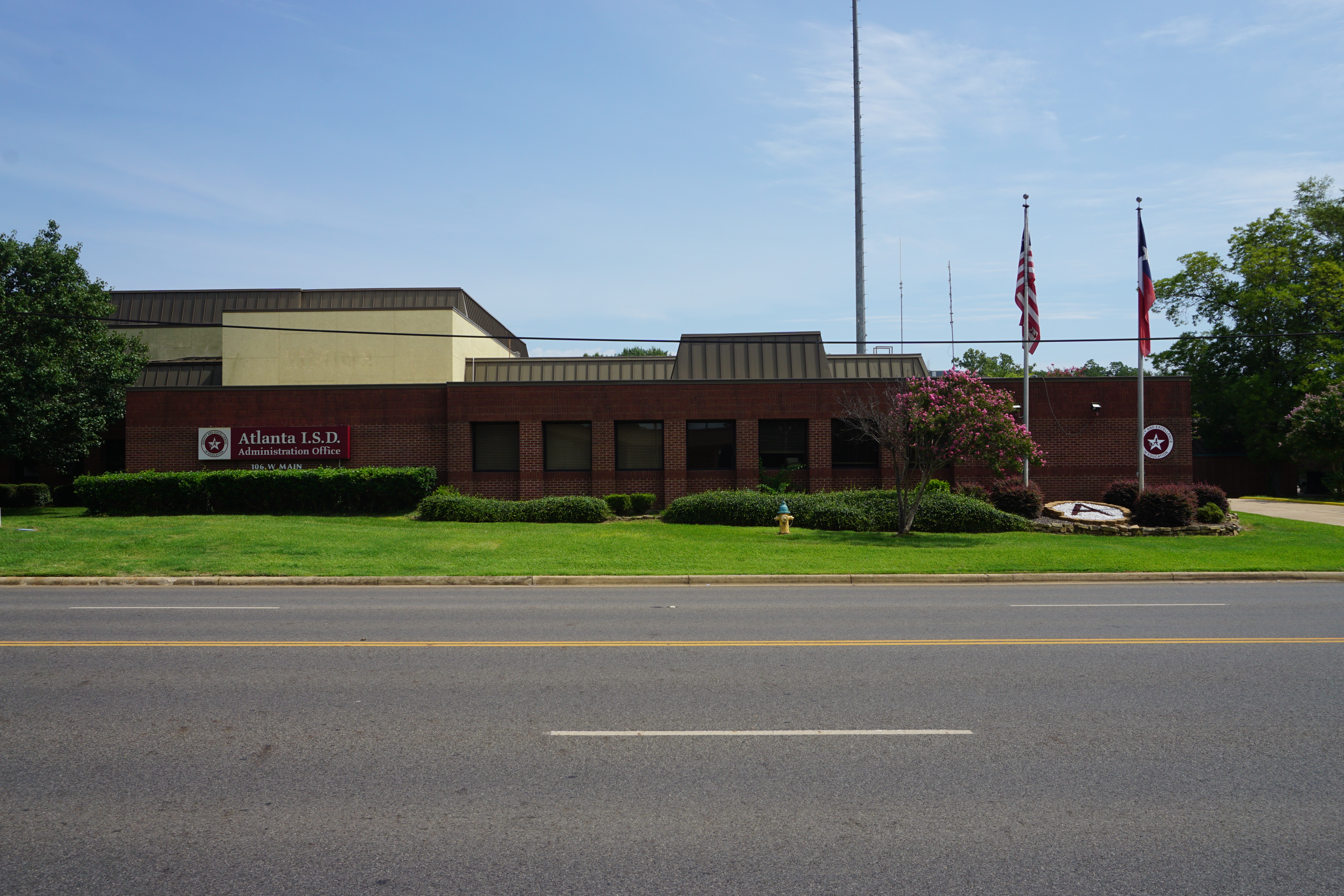
- Atlanta ISD Administration Office

Location
- 106 W Main St. Atlanta, Texas ESC Region 8 USA
- Coordinates: 33°6′53″N 94°10′2″W

District information
- Type: Independent school district
- Grades: Pre-K through 12
- Superintendent: Jason Harris
- Schools: 5 (2009-10)
- NCES District ID: 4808880

Students and staff
- Students: 1,801 (2010-11)
- Teachers: 133.94 (2009-10) (on full-time equivalent (FTE) basis)
- Student–teacher ratio: 13.54 (2009-10)
- Athletic conference: UIL Class 3A Football
- District mascot: Rabbits
- Colors: Maroon, White

Other information
- TEA District Accountability Rating for 2011-12: Academically Acceptable
- Website: Atlanta ISD

Atlanta Independent School District is a public school district based in Atlanta, Texas (USA). In addition to the majority of Atlanta, the district also serves the town of Douglassville and the census-designated place of Bivins. The district operates one high school, Atlanta High School.

== History ==
In the wake of the Civil Rights Movement in the 20th century, the district had a "freedom of choice plan" where students could pick which formerly de jure segregated schools to attend. However this plan was to expire in summer 1970, and at that time, the then-new senior high school was to begin operations.

== Finances ==
As of the 2010–2011 school year, the appraised valuation of property in the district was $537,222,000. The maintenance tax rate was $0.104 and the bond tax rate was $0.015 per $100 of appraised valuation.

== Academic achievement ==
In 2011, the school district was rated "academically acceptable" by the Texas Education Agency. Forty-nine percent of districts in Texas in 2011 received the same rating. No state accountability ratings will be given to districts in 2012. A school district in Texas can receive one of four possible rankings from the Texas Education Agency: Exemplary (the highest possible ranking), Recognized, Academically Acceptable, and Academically Unacceptable (the lowest possible ranking).

Historical district TEA accountability ratings

- 2011: Academically Acceptable
- 2010: Recognized
- 2009: Academically Acceptable
- 2008: Academically Acceptable
- 2007: Academically Acceptable
- 2006: Academically Acceptable
- 2005: Academically Acceptable
- 2004: Academically Acceptable

== Schools ==
In the 2011–2012 school year, the district had students in five schools.

Regular instructional

- Atlanta High School (9th- 12th grade)
- Atlanta Middle School (6th- 8th grade)
- Atlanta Elementary School (3rd- 5th grade)
- Atlanta Primary School (Kindergarten- 2nd grade)

DAEP instructional

- Corrective Behavior Center (Grades 5-12)

Former schools

- Booker T. Washington High School
- Atlanta Grade School
- Miller Grade School
- Pruitt Elementary School
- Douglas School (initially K-12, with high school closed effective 1970 and with it becoming K-8)

== See also ==
- List of school districts in Texas
- List of high schools in Texas
