= Linden-Kildare Consolidated Independent School District =

School district in Texas

Address
- 205 Kildare Rd Linden, Texas, 75563; United States

District information
- Type: Public
- Grades: PK–12
- Superintendent: Rex Burks
- Governing agency: Texas Education Agency
- Schools: 3
- NCES District ID: 4827540

Students and staff
- Enrollment: 660 (2022–2023)
- Teachers: 64.57 (on an FTE basis)
- Student–teacher ratio: 10.22

Other information
- Website: www.lkcisd.net

Linden-Kildare Consolidated Independent School District is a public school district based in Linden, Texas, United States.

In addition to Linden, the district also serves the unincorporated community of Kildare.

In 2009, the school district was rated "academically acceptable" by the Texas Education Agency.

== School ==
- Linden-Kildare High School (Grades 9-12)
- Mae Luster Stephens Junior High (Grades 6-8)
- Linden Elementary (Grades PK-5)

== Notable alumni ==
- Will Holland - member of The Lonely Hearts band
- Josiah Holland - member of The Lonely Hearts band
- Don Henley - Founding member of The Eagles
- John Beasley (basketball) - Professional Basketball Player
- Richard Bowden - Musician and member of Pinkard and Bowden Country duo
