= Atlanta, Texas =

- City
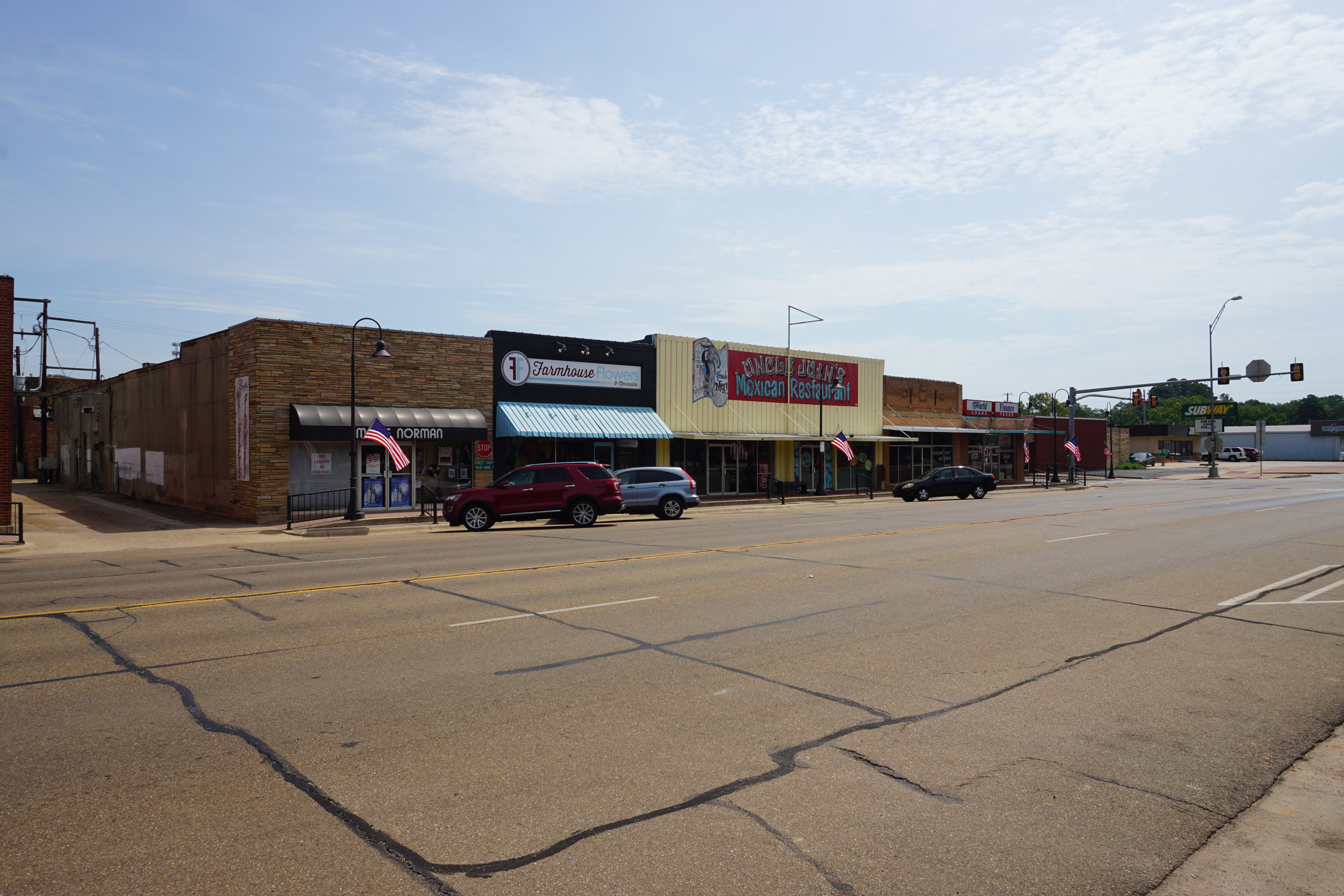
- E Main Street in Atlanta
- Motto: One City Under God
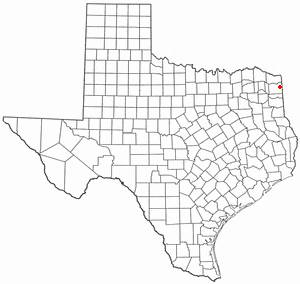
- Location of Atlanta, Texas

- Coordinates: 33°07′26″N 94°09′20″W
- Country: United States
- State: Texas
- County: Cass

Government
  - Type: Strong City Manager form of Government, Home Rule Charter

Area
  - Total: 12.65 sq mi (32.77 km^{2})
  - Land: 12.50 sq mi (32.37 km^{2})
  - Water: 0.15 sq mi (0.39 km^{2})
- Elevation: 256 ft (78 m)

Population (2020)
  - Total: 5,433
  - Density: 434.7/sq mi (167.8/km^{2})
- Time zone: UTC-6 (Central (CST))
  - Summer (DST): UTC-5 (CDT)
- ZIP code: 75551
- Area codes: 430, 903
- FIPS code: 48-04516
- GNIS feature ID: 2409749
- Website: atlantatexas.org

Atlanta is a city in Cass County, northeastern Texas, United States. According to the 2010 U.S. census, the city had a population of 5,675, which decreased to 5,433 as of 2020. The city is sometimes referred to as "Hometown, USA."

== History ==
Atlanta was established in 1872 with the building of the Texas and Pacific Railway and was named for Atlanta, Georgia, former home of many early settlers; a post office was opened that same year.

By 1885, the community had 1,500 residents, who had founded three White and two Black churches, two schools, a bank, several sawmills, a number of general stores, and a weekly newspaper, the Citizens' Journal. Lumbering was the chief industry. The lumber boom reached its peak around 1890, when the population was 1,764. When the community was incorporated in 1929, it had 1,900 residents and 105 businesses.

In 1938, following a deadly tornado just 10 miles away in Rodessa, Louisiana, hospitals in Atlanta would treat many of those affected.

The onset of the Great Depression in the 1930s forced many businesses to close, and in 1936, Atlanta had 85 rated businesses. The opening of the Rodessa oilfield in 1935, however, helped mitigate the worst effects of the Depression. By 1940, the town had modern canneries, lumber mills, wholesale houses, a brick plant, a hospital, and a population of 2,453. Subsequently, Atlanta grew steadily, topping the 4,000 mark for the first time in the early 1960s. In 1990, its population was 6,118. By 2000, the population had dropped to 5,745. Principal industries include farming, forestry, oil, and tourism.

== Geography ==
Atlanta is the largest city in Cass County and is located in eastern Cass County. It is bordered to the north by Queen City.

U.S. Route 59 bypasses the city to the west, leading north 25 miles (40 km) to Texarkana and southwest 14 miles (23 km) to Linden. Texas State Highway 77 passes through the southern side of the city, leading southeast 10 miles (16 km) to the Louisiana border and northwest 13 miles (21 km) to Douglassville. Texas State Highway 43 passes through the center of Atlanta and leads south 47 miles (76 km) to Marshall.

According to the United States Census Bureau, Atlanta has a total area of 12.7 square miles (32.8 km^{2}), of which 0.2 square miles (0.4 km^{2}), or 1.19%, is covered by water.

=== Climate ===
The climate in this area is characterized by hot, humid summers and generally mild to cool winters. According to the Köppen climate classification, Atlanta has a humid subtropical climate, Cfa on climate maps.

Climate data for Atlanta, Texas (1991–2020 normals, extremes 1874–present)
Month	Jan	Feb	Mar	Apr	May	Jun	Jul	Aug	Sep	Oct	Nov	Dec	Year
Record high °F (°C)	85 (29)	89 (32)	92 (33)	96 (36)	102 (39)	105 (41)	108 (42)	110 (43)	109 (43)	99 (37)	88 (31)	84 (29)	110 (43)
Mean maximum °F (°C)	76.4 (24.7)	79.1 (26.2)	84.6 (29.2)	87.5 (30.8)	92.4 (33.6)	96.3 (35.7)	100.2 (37.9)	101.4 (38.6)	98.0 (36.7)	91.3 (32.9)	82.8 (28.2)	77.4 (25.2)	102.6 (39.2)
Mean daily maximum °F (°C)	56.2 (13.4)	60.1 (15.6)	68.7 (20.4)	76.1 (24.5)	83.2 (28.4)	90.6 (32.6)	94.4 (34.7)	94.7 (34.8)	88.4 (31.3)	78.0 (25.6)	66.2 (19.0)	58.3 (14.6)	76.2 (24.6)
Daily mean °F (°C)	44.6 (7.0)	48.3 (9.1)	56.0 (13.3)	63.4 (17.4)	71.8 (22.1)	79.6 (26.4)	83.1 (28.4)	82.9 (28.3)	76.2 (24.6)	65.0 (18.3)	54.2 (12.3)	47.0 (8.3)	64.3 (18.0)
Mean daily minimum °F (°C)	33.1 (0.6)	36.5 (2.5)	43.4 (6.3)	50.6 (10.3)	60.4 (15.8)	68.6 (20.3)	71.7 (22.1)	71.0 (21.7)	64.0 (17.8)	52.0 (11.1)	42.2 (5.7)	35.7 (2.1)	52.4 (11.4)
Mean minimum °F (°C)	21.2 (−6.0)	26.3 (−3.2)	30.4 (−0.9)	38.3 (3.5)	49.6 (9.8)	62.3 (16.8)	68.0 (20.0)	65.9 (18.8)	54.3 (12.4)	39.0 (3.9)	28.8 (−1.8)	24.3 (−4.3)	19.5 (−6.9)
Record low °F (°C)	−2 (−19)	−5 (−21)	15 (−9)	31 (−1)	39 (4)	52 (11)	58 (14)	53 (12)	42 (6)	28 (−2)	16 (−9)	5 (−15)	−5 (−21)
Average precipitation inches (mm)	4.12 (105)	4.67 (119)	4.51 (115)	4.46 (113)	5.17 (131)	3.86 (98)	3.29 (84)	3.10 (79)	3.86 (98)	4.42 (112)	4.06 (103)	4.76 (121)	50.28 (1,278)
Average snowfall inches (cm)	0.2 (0.51)	0.6 (1.5)	0.1 (0.25)	0.0 (0.0)	0.0 (0.0)	0.0 (0.0)	0.0 (0.0)	0.0 (0.0)	0.0 (0.0)	0.0 (0.0)	0.0 (0.0)	0.0 (0.0)	0.9 (2.26)
Average precipitation days (≥ 0.01 in)	7.8	8.7	9.1	8.6	7.9	7.0	6.6	6.1	5.7	6.9	7.6	8.2	90.2
Average snowy days (≥ 0.1 in)	0.1	0.3	0.1	0.0	0.0	0.0	0.0	0.0	0.0	0.0	0.0	0.0	0.5
Source 1: NOAA
Source 2: National Weather Service

== Demographics ==
Historical population
Census	Pop.	Note	%±
1880	396		—
1890	1,764		345.5%
1900	1,301		−26.2%
1910	1,604		23.3%
1920	1,469		−8.4%
1930	1,685		14.7%
1940	2,453		45.6%
1950	3,782		54.2%
1960	4,076		7.8%
1970	5,007		22.8%
1980	6,272		25.3%
1990	6,118		−2.5%
2000	5,745		−6.1%
2010	5,675		−1.2%
2020	5,433		−4.3%
U.S. Decennial Census

=== 2020 census ===
As of the 2020 census, 5,433 people, 2,147 households, and 1,466 families were residing in the city.

The median age was 40.5 years; 25.4% of residents were under the age of 18 and 21.4% of residents were 65 years of age or older. For every 100 females there were 88.1 males, and for every 100 females age 18 and over there were 82.1 males.

80.0% of residents lived in urban areas, while 20.0% lived in rural areas.

Of the 2,147 households, 30.0% had children under the age of 18 living in them. Of all households, 40.1% were married-couple households, 17.9% were households with a male householder and no spouse or partner present, and 37.0% were households with a female householder and no spouse or partner present. About 32.2% of all households were made up of individuals and 16.1% had someone living alone who was 65 years of age or older.

There were 2,476 housing units, of which 13.3% were vacant. Among occupied housing units, 60.5% were owner-occupied and 39.5% were renter-occupied. The homeowner vacancy rate was 2.5% and the rental vacancy rate was 12.1%.

Racial composition as of the 2020 census
Race	Percent
White	61.5%
Black or African American	29.6%
American Indian and Alaska Native	0.5%
Asian	0.6%
Native Hawaiian and Other Pacific Islander	0.1%
Some other race	2.7%
Two or more races	5.1%
Hispanic or Latino (of any race)	5.3%

=== 2010 census ===
As of the 2010 census 5,745 people, 2,254 households, and 1,571 families were living in the city. The population density was 525.4 inhabitants per square mile (202.9/km^{2}). The 2,556 housing units had an average density of 233.8 per square mile (90.3/km^{2}). The racial makeup of the city was 68.13% White, 29.23% African American, 0.52% Native American, 0.37% Asian, 0.51% from other races, and 1.25% from two or more races. Hispanics or Latinos of any race were 1.72% of the population.

Of the 2,254 households, 32.9% had children under t18 living with them, 47.0% were married couples living together, 18.6% had a female householder with no husband present, and 30.3% were not families. About 27.7% of all households were made up of individuals, and 14.5% had someone living alone who was 65 or older. The average household size was 2.46 and the average family size was 2.98.

In the city, the age distribution was 27.0% under 18, 8.7% from 18 to 24, 24.0% from 25 to 44, 21.4% from 45 to 64, and 19.0% who were 65 or older. The median age was 37 years. For every 100 females, there were 83.7 males. For every 100 females 18 and over, there were 74.5 males.

The median income for a household in the city was $27,188, and for a family was $32,679. Males had a median income of $29,286 versus $19,715 for females. The per capita income for the city was $14,013. About 19.0% of families and 23.5% of the population were below the poverty line, including 33.4% of those under 18 and 19.4% of those 65 or over.

== Education ==
Most of Atlanta is served by the Atlanta Independent School District, which operates Atlanta High School. The remainder is zoned to Queen City Independent School District, which operates Queen City High School.

Atlanta is also served by Texarkana College (the majority of Cass County, including Atlanta ISD and Queen City ISD, is in the college's service area).

Texas A&M-Texarkana is in the area.

== Notable people ==
- Derrick Blaylock, former National Football League (NFL) player
- Tony Buzbee, Texas attorney
- Susanna Clark, artist and country/folk songwriter, was born in Atlanta.
- Bessie Coleman (1892–1926), civil aviator
- Ellen DeGeneres, talk show host and comedian
- Phil Epps, former NFL player
- Tracy Lawrence, country musician
- Andrea Lee, American kickboxer and mixed martial artist
- Gordon McLendon, pioneer of American commercial broadcasting
- Slim Richey (1938–2015), musician, was born in Atlanta.
- Max Sandlin is a former Democratic congressman.
- Joseph Strickland, former Roman Catholic bishop
- Drew Stubbs, baseball player
- Nat Stuckey, American country singer
- Ted Thompson, former general manager of the Green Bay Packers
- Barbara Smith Conrad, an American mezzo-soprano opera singer was born in Atlanta.
- Col. Robert "Danny" Barr, former Air Force One Pilot, 1979-1997
- Dr. John Burba, "Godfather of Lithium"
- R. Travis Ransom, county judge of Cass County, Texas and Command Sgt. Maj. in the US Army Reserves
