= Linden, Texas =

- City
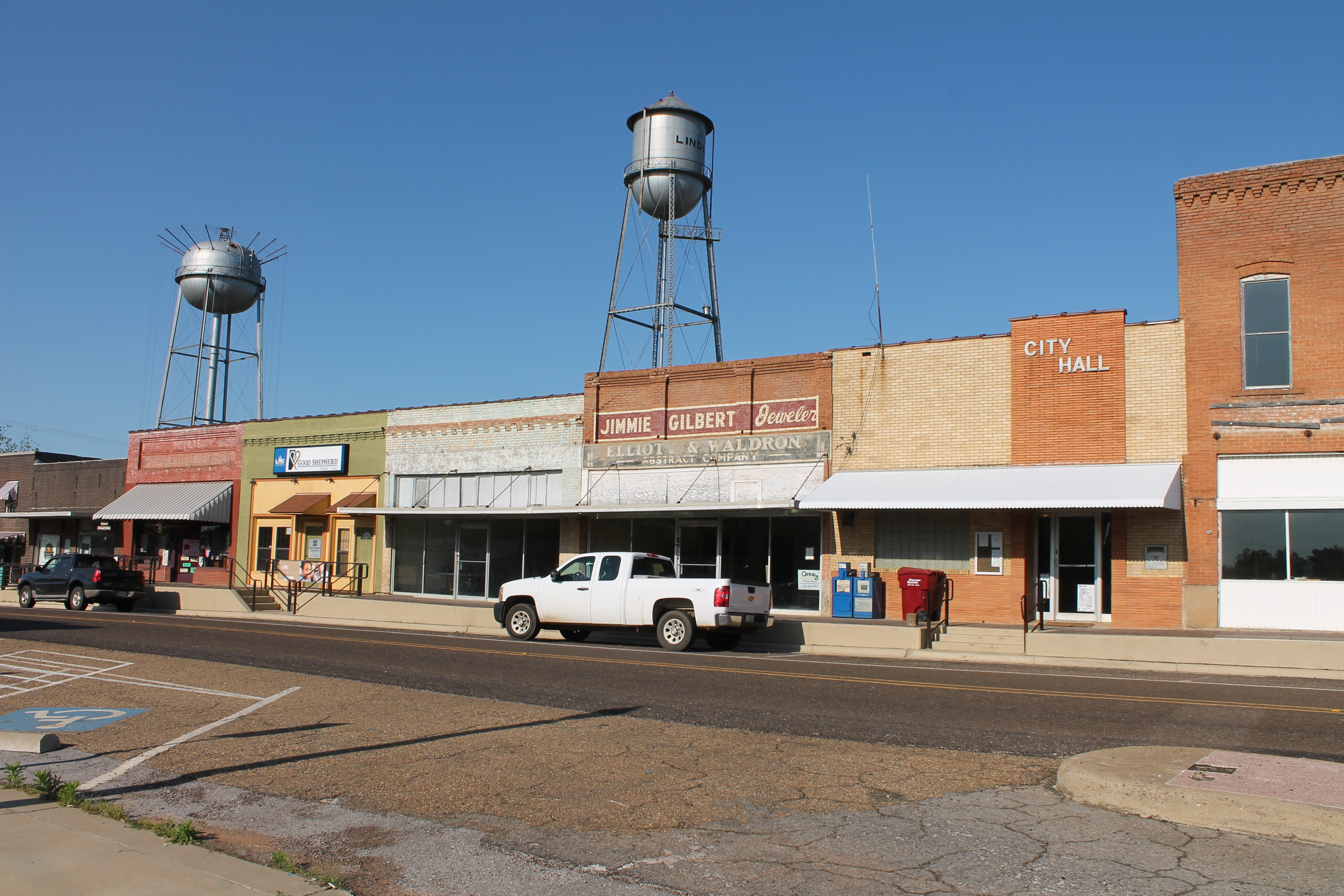
- Downtown Linden

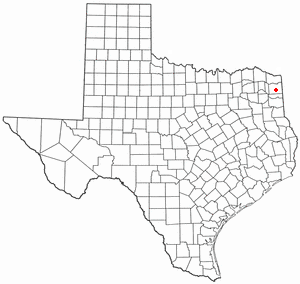
- Location of Linden, Texas

- Coordinates: 33°0′29″N 94°21′52″W
- Country: United States
- State: Texas
- County: Cass

Area
  - Total: 3.53 sq mi (9.14 km^{2})
  - Land: 3.53 sq mi (9.14 km^{2})
  - Water: 0 sq mi (0.00 km^{2})
- Elevation: 367 ft (112 m)

Population (2020)
  - Total: 1,825
  - Density: 517/sq mi (200/km^{2})
- Time zone: UTC-6 (Central (CST))
  - Summer (DST): UTC-5 (CDT)
- ZIP code: 75563
- Area codes: 903, 430
- FIPS code: 48-42844
- GNIS feature ID: 2410837
- Website: www.lindentx.gov

Linden is a city in and the county seat of Cass County, Texas, United States. At the 2020 United States census, its population was 1,825. Linden is named after the city of Linden in Perry County, Tennessee (of which that Linden is the current seat).

== Geography ==
Linden is located south of the center of Cass County. U.S. Route 59 passes through the east side of the city, leading northeast 14 miles (23 km) to Atlanta and south 18 miles (29 km) to Jefferson. According to the United States Census Bureau, the city has a total area of 3.5 square miles (9.1 km^{2}), all land.

== Demographics ==
Historical population
Census	Pop.	Note	%±
1890	444		—
1900	316		−28.8%
1910	329		4.1%
1920	702		113.4%
1930	718		2.3%
1940	1,168		62.7%
1950	1,744		49.3%
1960	1,832		5.0%
1970	2,264		23.6%
1980	2,443		7.9%
1990	2,375		−2.8%
2000	2,256		−5.0%
2010	1,988		−11.9%
2020	1,825		−8.2%
U.S. Decennial Census

=== 2020 census ===
As of the 2020 census, Linden had a population of 1,825, 917 households, and 603 families. The median age was 48.8 years. 20.2% of residents were under the age of 18 and 26.5% of residents were 65 years of age or older. For every 100 females there were 88.0 males, and for every 100 females age 18 and over there were 86.8 males age 18 and over.

0.0% of residents lived in urban areas, while 100.0% lived in rural areas.

There were 792 households in Linden, of which 25.9% had children under the age of 18 living in them. Of all households, 36.6% were married-couple households, 19.3% were households with a male householder and no spouse or partner present, and 39.3% were households with a female householder and no spouse or partner present. About 37.5% of all households were made up of individuals and 18.4% had someone living alone who was 65 years of age or older.

There were 947 housing units, of which 16.4% were vacant. The homeowner vacancy rate was 2.2% and the rental vacancy rate was 12.3%.

Racial composition as of the 2020 census
Race	Number	Percent
White	1,262	69.2%
Black or African American	356	19.5%
American Indian and Alaska Native	14	0.8%
Asian	6	0.3%
Native Hawaiian and Other Pacific Islander	0	0.0%
Some other race	62	3.4%
Two or more races	125	6.8%
Hispanic or Latino (of any race)	139	7.6%

=== 2010 census ===
At the 2010 census there were 1,988 people, 940 households, and 579 families living in the city. The population density was 640.4 inhabitants per square mile (247.3/km^{2}). There were 1,048 housing units at an average density of 297.5 per square mile (114.9/km^{2}). The racial makeup of the city was 77.88% White, 19.86% African American, 0.44% Native American, 0.18% Asian, 0.66% from other races, and 0.98% from two or more races. Hispanic or Latino of any race were 1.64%.

Of the 940 households, 27.1% had children under the age of 18 living with them, 43.2% were married couples living together, 15.3% had a female householder with no husband present, and 38.3% were non-families. 36.0% of households were one person and 21.0% were one person aged 65 or older. The average household size was 2.20 and the average family size was 2.86.

The age distribution was 22.2% under the age of 18, 7.5% from 18 to 24, 23.0% from 25 to 44, 21.9% from 45 to 64, and 25.4% 65 or older. The median age was 43 years. For every 100 females, there were 85.1 males. For every 100 females age 18 and over, there were 80.1 males.

The median household income was $25,250 and the median family income was $35,938. Males had a median income of $29,762 versus $21,731 for females. The per capita income for the city was $14,846. About 11.8% of families and 18.5% of the population were below the poverty line, including 22.2% of those under age 18 and 23.0% of those age 65 or over.

== Education ==
Linden is served by the Linden-Kildare Consolidated Independent School District.

== Notable people ==
- John Beasley, SWC basketball player
- Don Buford, former Major League Baseball player born here
- Ed Hargett, All SWC QB and NFL QB for the Oilers and Saints
- Don Henley, lead singer and drummer of the Eagles
- Scott Joplin, prominent ragtime composer and musician
- Brig Owens, football player with the Washington Redskins
- T-Bone Walker, blues guitarist and singer born here
