= Area codes 903 and 430 =

Area codes for northeast Texas, United States

Coordinates: 31.43°N 99.12°W

Numbering plan areas and area codes of Texas with numbering plan area 430/903 highlighted.

Area codes 903 and 430 are telephone area codes in the North American Numbering Plan (NANP) for the northeastern part of the U.S. state of Texas, including Kilgore, Texarkana, Tyler, Greenville, and Sherman. The numbering plan area begins just north and east of the Dallas–Fort Worth metroplex, and extends to the Oklahoma, Arkansas, and Louisiana state borders. Area code 903 was created November 4, 1990 in a split of area code 214. Area code 430 was assigned to the same service area on February 15, 2003, in creation of an overlay. Before October 18, 1980, area code 903 was assigned to an area in northwestern Mexico.

== History ==
From 1962 until October 18, 1980, area code 903 was an area code for parts of northwestern Mexico served by Telefónica Fronteriza (TF), which homed on AT&T lines in the United States rather than Telefonos de Mexico (Telmex). Telmex and the Mexican government forcibly acquired the TF exchanges and, in 1980, Telmex reorganized the numbering plan of the country, using the digit 6 to start eight-digit numbers in the northwest. AT&T withdrew 903 from use and reassigned the area with area code 706, as one of two area codes (903 and 905) for alternative dialing into certain parts of Mexico from the United States.

== Service area ==
Counties served by the area codes:

Anderson, Bowie, Camp, Cass, Cherokee, Delta, Fannin, Franklin, Freestone, Grayson, Gregg, Harrison, Henderson, Hill, Hopkins, Hunt, Kaufman, Lamar, Leon, Madison, Marion, Morris, Navarro, Panola, Rains, Red River, Rusk, Smith, Titus, Upshur, Van Zandt, and Wood

Towns and cities served by the overlay:

Alba, Annona, Arp, Arthur City, Athens, Atlanta, Avery, Avinger, Bagwell, Bailey, Barry, Beckville, Bells, Ben Franklin, Ben Wheeler, Big Sandy, Bivins, Bloomburg, Blooming Grove, Blossom, Bogata, Bonham, Brashear, Brookston, Buffalo, Bullard, Caddo Mills, Campbell, Canton, Carthage, Cason, Cayuga, Celeste, Centerville, Chatfield, Chicota, Clarksville, Clayton, Coffee City, Collinsville, Commerce, Como, Cookville, Cooper, Corsicana, Cumby, Cuney, Cunningham, Daingerfield, De Berry, De Kalb, Denison, Deport, Detroit, Dew, Diana, Dike, Dodd City, Douglassville, Easton, Ector, Edgewood, Edom, Elkhart, Elysian Fields, Emory, Enloe, Eustace, Fairfield, Flint, Frankston, Frost, Fruitvale, Gallatin, Gary City, Gilmer, Gober, Golden, Gordonville, Grand Saline, Greenville, Gunter, Hawkins, Henderson, Honey Grove, Hooks, Howe, Ivanhoe, Jacksonville, Jefferson, Jewett, Joinerville, Jonesville, Judson, Karnack, Kemp, Kildare, Kilgore, Kirvin, Klondike, Ladonia, Laird Hill, Lake Creek, Laneville, Larue, Leesburg, Leona, Leonard, Lindale, Linden, Lodi, Lone Oak, Lone Star, Long Branch, Longview, Mabank, Marietta, Marquez, Marshall, Maud, Maydelle, McLeod, Merit, Mertens, Midway, Minden, Mineola, Mount Enterprise, Mount Pleasant, Mount Vernon, Naples, Nash, Neches, New Boston, New London, New Summerfield, Oakwood, Omaha, Ore City, Overton, Palestine, Panola, Paris, Pattonville, Pecan Gap, Petty, Pickton, Pittsburg, Point, Pottsboro, Powderly, Powell, Poynor, Price, Purdon, Queen City, Quinlan, Quitman, Randolph, Ravenna, Redwater, Rice, Richland, Roxton, Sadler, Saltillo, Savoy, Scottsville, Scroggins, Selman City, Sherman, Simms, Southmayd, Streetman, Sulphur Bluff, Sulphur Springs, Sumner, Talco, Tatum, Telephone, Tennessee Colony, Texarkana, Tom Bean, Trenton, Tyler, Union Valley, Van Alstyne, Van, Waskom, White Oak, Whitehouse, Whitesboro, Whitewright, Windom, Winfield, Winona, Wolfe City, Woodlawn, and Yantis

== See also ==
- List of Texas area codes

Texas area codes: 210/726, 214/469/972/945, 254, 325, 361, 409, 432, 512/737, 713/281/832/346, 806, 817/682, 830, 903/430, 915, 936, 940, 956, 979
	North: 580, 870	
West: 214/469/945/972, 254, 940	430/903	East: 318, 870
	South: 936, 979	
Arkansas area codes: 479, 501, 870/327
Louisiana area codes: 225, 318/457, 337, 504, 985
Oklahoma area codes: 405/572, 580, 918/539
