= Carthage High School (Texas) =

Location
- 1600 W Panola St. Carthage, Texas 75633-0197; United States; 32.1623°N 94.3651°W

Information
- School type: Public High School
- School district: Carthage Independent School District
- Principal: Justin Smith
- Staff: 66.60 (FTE)
- Grades: 9–12
- Enrollment: 788 (2023–2024)
- Student to teacher ratio: 11.83
- Colors: Red & White
- Athletics conference: UIL Class AAAA
- Mascot: Bulldogs
- Rival: Center High School Henderson High School
- Newspaper: The Carthaginian
- Yearbook: Pine Burr
- Website: Carthage High School

Carthage High School is a public high school located in the city of Carthage, Texas, United States. It is part of the Carthage Independent School District located in central Panola County and classified as a 4A school by the University Interscholastic League (UIL). In 2022, the Texas Education Agency awarded Carthage high a grade of "A", with distinctions earned in ELA/Reading, Mathematics, Science, Progress, Closing the Gaps, and Postsecondary Readiness.

== Academics ==
=== Academic Events ===
- Chess Team
- Debate Team
- One Act Play
- Speech
- Journalism

=== UIL State Academic Titles ===
- Girls Debate (3A) - 1959, 1960, 1962
- Girls Extemporaneous Speaking (3A) - 1960
- Boys Debate (3A) - 1959, 1961, 1962, 1963
- Boys Informative Speaking (3A) - 1965
- Poetry Interpretation (4A) - 1999
- Biology (3A) - 2003
- Cross-Examination Debate (3A) - 2003
- Journalism (3A) - 2003

=== Other State Titles ===
- 2003 Top Ranking Engineering Team - JETS
- 2009 Texas State Champions - TSA
- 2010 Texas State Champions - TSA
- 2010 Class 3A Texas State Powerlifting Champions, 123 lbs (non-UIL)

== Athletics ==
The Carthage Bulldogs compete in the following sports: Cross Country, Volleyball, Football, Basketball, Powerlifting, Soccer, Golf, Tennis, Track, Baseball & Softball

=== Football ===
State champion
State finalist
State final four
State quarterfinalist

Football Competition Record Table
Season	Conf	Dist	Overall Record	District Record	Playoff Record	Coach	UIL Ref
1924			0-4			T.W. Cocke	
1925			2-3-2			Coach Jordan	
1926			7-2			Coach Lacy	
1927			6-2				
1928	B	16	2-4-1				
1929	B	16	1-8-2				
1930			3-4-1			W.D. Garrett	
1931			4-3-3			E.B. Morrison (15-10-6)	
1932	B	18	6-3-2			E.B. Morrison (15-10-6)	
1933	B	18	5-4-1			E.B. Morrison (15-10-6)	
1934	B	22	3-6-1				
1935	B	22	2-6-2			Clyde Carter	
1936	B	20	6-3-1			C.A. Ethredge	
1937	B	20	3-6-1			Clayton Stribling (16-18-4)	
1938	B	22	5-2-2			Clayton Stribling (16-18-4)	
1939	B	22	4-5-0			Clayton Stribling (16-18-4)	
1940	1A	22	4-5-1			Clayton Stribling (16-18-4)	
1941	1A	22	3-6			Louis Robinson	
1942	1A	24	5-3			Horace Hartsell (11-5-1)	
1943	1A	24	6-2-1			Horace Hartsell (11-5-1)	
1944	1A	24	6-4			Jimmy Keeth (22-8-1)	
1945	1A	24	8-2			Jimmy Keeth (22-8-1)	
1946	1A	24	8-2-1			Jimmy Keeth (22-8-1)	
1947	1A	24	8-3			George Bounds (31-18-2)	
1948	1A	16	4-4-2			George Bounds (31-18-2)	
1949	1A	16	4-6			George Bounds (31-18-2)	
1950	1A	17	8-2			George Bounds (31-18-2)	
1951	1A	17	7-3			George Bounds (31-18-2)	
1952	2A	16	7-3			Ralph Murff (55-17-3)	
1953	2A	16	7-3			Ralph Murff (55-17-3)	
1954	2A	16	10-1-2		2-1	Ralph Murff (55-17-3)	
1955	2A	16	7-3			Ralph Murff (55-17-3)	
1956	3A	7	5-5			Ralph Murff (55-17-3)	
1957	3A	7	8-1			Ralph Murff (55-17-3)	
1958	3A	7	11-1-1		1-1	Ralph Murff (55-17-3)	
1959	3A	7	3-6			J.E. (Red) Willis) (28-20-2)	
1960	3A	7	7-3			J.E. (Red) Willis) (28-20-2)	
1961	3A	7	8-2-1			J.E. (Red) Willis) (28-20-2)	
1962	3A	7	6-4			J.E. (Red) Willis) (28-20-2)	
1963	3A	7	4-5-1			J.E. (Red) Willis) (28-20-2)	
1964	3A	7	1-9			Phil Koonce (24-35-1)	
1965	3A	7	4-6			Phil Koonce (24-35-1)	
1966	3A	7	8-2			Phil Koonce (24-35-1)	
1967	3A	7	6-4			Phil Koonce (24-35-1)	
1968	3A	7	3-7			Phil Koonce (24-35-1)	
1969	3A	7	2-7-1			Phil Koonce (24-35-1)	
1970	3A	8	4-6			Bill Brasher	
1971	3A	8	3-6-1			Everett (Sleepy) Reynolds (190-72-10)	
1972	3A	9	3-7			Everett (Sleepy) Reynolds (190-72-10)	
1973	3A	9	2-7-1			Everett (Sleepy) Reynolds (190-72-10)	
1974	3A	9	3-7			Everett (Sleepy) Reynolds (190-72-10)	
1975	3A	9	6-4			Everett (Sleepy) Reynolds (190-72-10)	
1976	3A	8	4-5-1			Everett (Sleepy) Reynolds (190-72-10)	
1977	3A	8	4-6			Everett (Sleepy) Reynolds (190-72-10)	
1978	3A	8	11-1		1-1	Everett (Sleepy) Reynolds (190-72-10)	
1979	3A	8	9-2		0-1	Everett (Sleepy) Reynolds (190-72-10)	
1980	4A	8	5-4-1			Everett (Sleepy) Reynolds (190-72-10)	
1981	4A	8	8-2			Everett (Sleepy) Reynolds (190-72-10)	
1982	4A	8	9-2-1		1-1	Everett (Sleepy) Reynolds (190-72-10)	
1983	4A	8	11-3		3-1	Everett (Sleepy) Reynolds (190-72-10)	
1984	4A	8	9-2-1		0-1	Everett (Sleepy) Reynolds (190-72-10)	
1985	4A	8	9-3-1		1-1	Everett (Sleepy) Reynolds (190-72-10)	
1986	4A	8	6-3-1			Everett (Sleepy) Reynolds (190-72-10)	
1987	4A	8	5-5			Everett (Sleepy) Reynolds (190-72-10)	
1988	4A	16	4-5-1			Everett (Sleepy) Reynolds (190-72-10)	
1989	4A	16	5-5			Everett (Sleepy) Reynolds (190-72-10)	
1990	4A	16	6-3-1			Everett (Sleepy) Reynolds (190-72-10)	
1991	4A	16	15-1		5-1	Everett (Sleepy) Reynolds (190-72-10)	
1992	4A	15	8-3			Everett (Sleepy) Reynolds (190-72-10)	
1993	4A	15	8-3-1		0-1	Everett (Sleepy) Reynolds (190-72-10)	
1994	4A	17	8-3		0-1	Everett (Sleepy) Reynolds (190-72-10)	
1995	4A	17	2-8			Everett (Sleepy) Reynolds (190-72-10)	
1996	4A II	16	8-4		1-1	Everett (Sleepy) Reynolds (190-72-10)	
1997	4A II	16	7-4		0-1	Everett (Sleepy) Reynolds (190-72-10)	
1998	4A II	17	8-4		1-1	Everett (Sleepy) Reynolds (190-72-10)	
1999	4A II	17	5-5			Everett (Sleepy) Reynolds (190-72-10)	
2000	4A II	16	1-9			Charles Lafall (9-23)	
2001	4A II	16	1-9			Charles Lafall (9-23)	
2002	3A I	16	7-5		1-1	Charles Lafall (9-23)	
2003	3A I	16	8-4		1-1	Benny Mitchell (14-8)	
2004	3A I	16	6-4	2-2		Benny Mitchell (14-8)	
2005	3A I	16	7-5	2-2	1-1	Mike Bickham (14-8)	
2006	3A I	20	7-3	2-3		Mike Bickham (14-8)	
2007	3A I	20	9-3	5-0	1-1	Scott Surratt; Overall (229-33); Playoffs (79-7)	
2008	3A II	18	14-2	5-0	6-0	Scott Surratt; Overall (229-33); Playoffs (79-7)	
2009	3A II	18	15-1	5-0	6-0	Scott Surratt; Overall (229-33); Playoffs (79-7)	
2010	3A II	16	14-2	5-0	6-0	Scott Surratt; Overall (229-33); Playoffs (79-7)	
2011	3A II	16	9-4	4-1	2-1	Scott Surratt; Overall (229-33); Playoffs (79-7)	
2012	3A I	20	10-3	6-0	3-1	Scott Surratt; Overall (229-33); Playoffs (79-7)	
2013	3A I	20	14-1	4-0	6-0	Scott Surratt; Overall (229-33); Playoffs (79-7)	
2014	4A I	9	5-7	3-2		Scott Surratt; Overall (229-33); Playoffs (79-7)	
2015	4A I	9	12-4	5-1	4-1	Scott Surratt; Overall (229-33); Playoffs (79-7)	
2016	4A I	9	13-2	4-2	6-0	Scott Surratt; Overall (229-33); Playoffs (79-7)	
2017	4A I	9	16-0	6-0	6-0	Scott Surratt; Overall (229-33); Playoffs (79-7)	
2018	4A I	10	14-1	5-0	4-1	Scott Surratt; Overall (229-33); Playoffs (79-7)	
2019	4A I	10	16-0	5-0	6-0	Scott Surratt; Overall (229-33); Playoffs (79-7)	
2020	4A II	10	14-0	5-0	6-0	Scott Surratt; Overall (229-33); Playoffs (79-7)	
2021	4A II	10	11-1	5-0	2-1	Scott Surratt; Overall (229-33); Playoffs (79-7)	
2022	4A II	8	16-0	6-0	6-0	Scott Surratt; Overall (229-33); Playoffs (79-7)	
2023	4A II	8	13-1	6-0	3-1	Scott Surratt; Overall (229-33); Playoffs (79-7)	
2024	4A II	8	16-0	6-0	6-0	Scott Surratt; Overall (229-33); Playoffs (79-7)	
2025	4A II	8	16-0	6-0	6-0	Scott Surratt; Overall (229-33); Playoffs (79-7)	
2026	4A II	8				Scott Surratt; Overall (229-33); Playoffs (79-7)	
Totals			716-371-41	100-13 (Note: District record since 2004. Research into prior records is ongoing.)	101-20 (Note: Research into prior records is ongoing.)		

Additional table references: MaxPreps, Texas High School Football History, and Lone Star Football.

=== State Titles ===
Carthage (UIL)

- Baseball - 1990(4A), 2005(3A), 2009(3A)
- Football - 2008 3A-D2, 2009 3A-D2, 2010 3A-D2, 2013 3A-D1, 2016 4A-D1, 2017 4A-D1, 2019 4A-D1, 2020 4A-D2, 2022 4A-D2, 2024 4A-D2 2025 4A-D2

Carthage Turner (PVIL)

- Boys Basketball - 1963(PVIL-3A)

==== State Finalists ====
Carthage (UIL)

- Baseball - 2001(4A)
- Girls Basketball - 1982(4A)
- Football - 1991(4A)

Carthage Turner (PVIL)

- Boys Basketball - 1962(PVIL-3A), 1965(PVIL-3A), 1968(PVIL-3A)

== Notable alumni ==
- John Booty, former NFL defensive back
- George Cochran, former MLB player
- Linda Davis, country music singer
- Moochie Dixon, NFL wide receiver
- KJ Edwards, college football running back for the Texas A&M Aggies
- Philip Humber, former MLB pitcher
- Keaontay Ingram, NFL running back
- Brian Lawrence, former MLB pitcher
- Kip Lewis, college football linebacker for the Oklahoma Sooners
- Audray McMillian, former NFL defensive back
- Jim Reeves, country music singer
- Brandon Rhyder, country music singer
- Jack Boynton Strong, Texas lawyer, businessman, and politician
