= National Register of Historic Places listings in Panola County, Texas =

Location of Panola County in Texas

This is a list of the National Register of Historic Places listings in Panola County, Texas.

This is intended to be a complete list of properties listed on the National Register of Historic Places in Panola County, Texas. There are three properties listed on the National Register in the county. Two properties are Recorded Texas Historic Landmarks including one that is designated a State Antiquities Landmark while the remaining property is also a State Antiquities Landmark.

This National Park Service list is complete through NPS recent listings posted March 21, 2025.

== Current listings ==
The locations of National Register properties may be seen in a mapping service provided.

	Name on the Register	Image	Date listed	Location	City or town	Description
1	International Boundary Marker	International Boundary Marker	April 13, 1977 (#77001463)	On Louisiana-Texas border, at intersection of FM 31 and LA 765; 32°02′03″N 94°02′34″W	Deadwood	State Antiquities Landmark, extends into DeSoto Parish, Louisiana
2	Methodist Church Concord	Methodist Church Concord	September 8, 1980 (#80004144)	SE of Carthage off TX 59; 32°00′24″N 94°14′50″W	Carthage	Recorded Texas Historic Landmark
3	Panola County Jail	Panola County Jail	June 29, 1976 (#76002057)	110 N. Shelby St. 32°09′29″N 94°20′20″W	Carthage	State Antiquities Landmark, Recorded Texas Historic Landmark

== See also ==
- National Register of Historic Places listings in Texas
- Recorded Texas Historic Landmarks in Panola County
