= Long Branch, Panola County, Texas =

Long Branch, Texas
- unincorporated community
- Location of Long Branch in Texas Long Branch, Texas (the United States)
- Coordinates: 32°04′23″N 94°34′05″W
- Country: United States
- State: Texas
- County: Panola
- Elevation: 371 ft (113 m)
- Time zone: UTC-6 (Central (CST))
  - Summer (DST): UTC-5 (CDT)
- ZIP code: 75669
- Area code: 903
- FIPS code: 48-48365
- GNIS feature ID: 1378605

Long Branch is an unincorporated community in Panola County, Texas, United States. According to the Handbook of Texas, the community had an estimated population of 181 in 2000.

== Geography ==
Long Branch is located at 32°04′23″N 94°34′05″W (32.072942, -94.567984). It is situated along FM 348 in southwestern Panola County, approximately 14 miles southwest of Carthage.

Long Branch lies 371 feet (113 m) above sea level.

== Education ==
Public education in the community of Long Branch is provided by the Carthage Independent School District.
