= Corinth, Panola County, Texas =

Corinth, Texas
- Unincorporated community
- Location within Texas Location within the United States
- Coordinates: 32°02′53″N 94°35′38″W
- Country: United States
- State: Texas
- County: Panola
- Elevation: 364 ft (111 m)
- Time zone: UTC-6 (Central (CST))
  - Summer (DST): UTC-5 (CDT)
- Area code: 903

Corinth is an unincorporated community in Panola County, Texas, United States. Corinth is located near Texas State Highway 315, 16 miles (26 km) southwest of Carthage.

== History ==
Corinth was settled in the 1860s and developed around the Corinth Church. The community had a school by the 1890s, which closed sometime after the 1930s. By the 1960s Corinth consisted of the church, a cemetery, and several scattered homes.
