= International Boundary Marker =

- U.S. National Register of Historic Places
- Texas State Antiquities Landmark
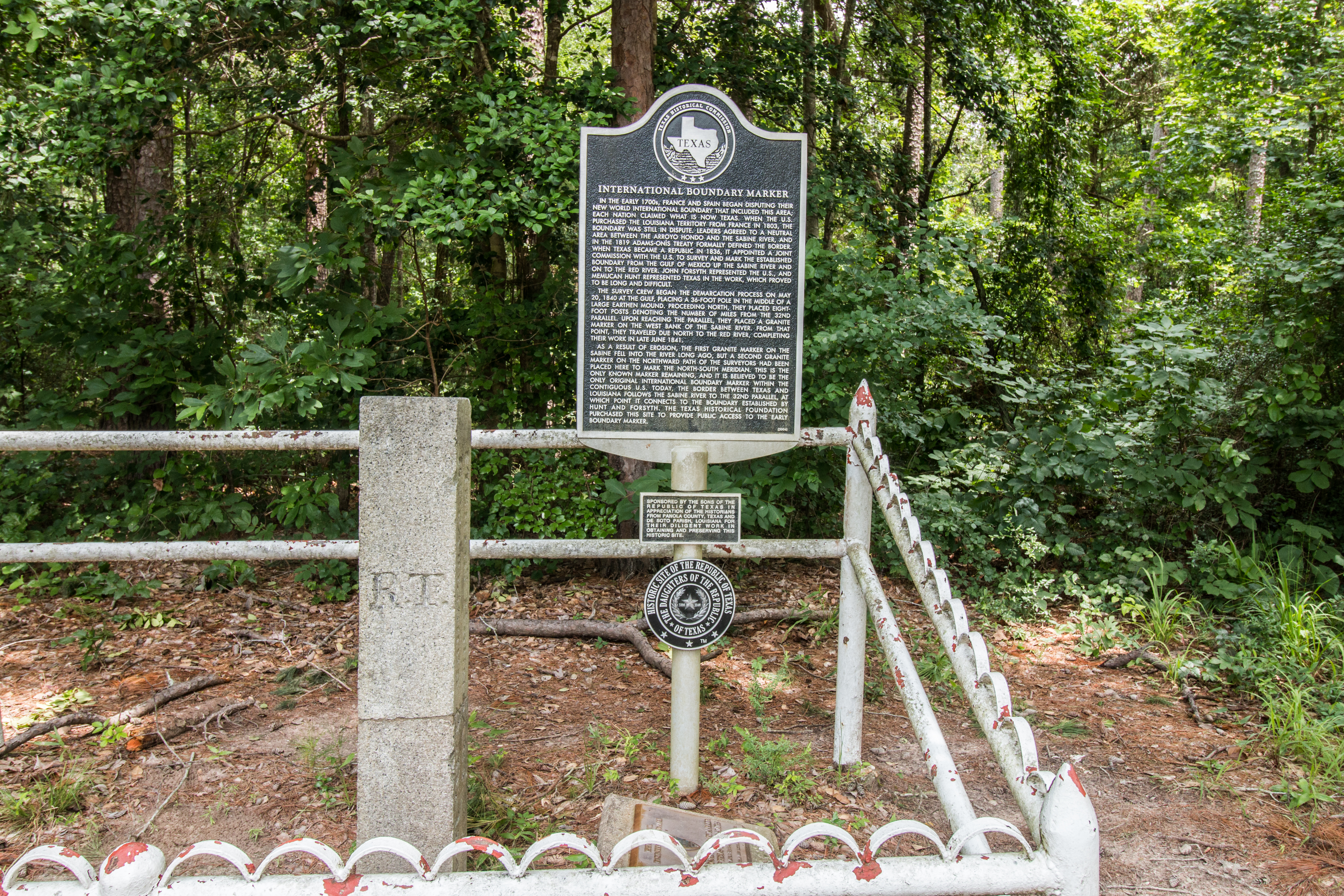
- International Boundary Marker in 2017

- Location within Texas Location within the United States Location within Louisiana Location within the United States
- Location: On Louisiana-Texas state line, at intersection of FM 31 and LA 765
- Nearest city: Deadwood, Texas, Logansport, Louisiana
- Coordinates: 32°2′3″N 94°2′35″W
- Area: 3 acres (1.2 ha)
- Built: 1840
- NRHP reference No.: 77001463
- TSAL No.: 8200002369

Significant dates
- Added to NRHP: April 13, 1977
- Designated TSAL: May 15, 2003

The International Boundary Marker, also known as the Republic of Texas Granite Marker, is a boundary marker located on the Louisiana–Texas border near the junction of Texas Farm to Market Road 31 and Louisiana Highway 765, southeast of Deadwood, Texas. The marker was created in 1840 and placed in 1841 to mark the international border between the United States and the Republic of Texas. The survey which established this border lasted from May 1840 to June 1841; the survey team faced hazardous, swampy conditions in their work and were forced to take several extended breaks due to weather and a lack of funding. The boundary marker is the only marker remaining from the Texas border survey and is one of only two known international boundary markers located entirely within the United States (the other being Ellicott's Stone near Mobile, Alabama).

The property of the three-acre (1.2 ha) area is shared between DeSoto Parish, Louisiana, which comprises one acre (4,000 m^{2}) and Panola County, Texas, which comprises the remaining two acres (8,000 m^{2}). The marker itself is property of the United States government.

The marker was added to the National Register of Historic Places on April 13, 1977. In 1980, the marker was designated as a State Historic Civil Engineering Landmark by the Texas and Louisiana Sections of the American Society of Civil Engineers.

== See also ==
- Dual State Monument: monument on the Arkansas-Louisiana border
- Texhomex: monument on the New Mexico-Oklahoma-Texas tripoint
- National Register of Historic Places listings in DeSoto Parish, Louisiana
- National Register of Historic Places listings in Panola County, Texas
