= Arleston, Texas =

Ghost town in Texas, US

Arleston is a ghost town in Panola County, Texas, United States. Founded c. late 1870s, a post office opened in 1881, closing in 1906. It peaked in the 1890s, with three businesses and 30 residents, but by the mid-1930s, was abandoned.
