= Clayton, Texas =

Unincorporated community in Panola County, Texas, United States

- Unincorporated community
- Location within Texas Location within the United States
- Coordinates: 32°05′54″N 94°28′30″W
- Country: United States
- State: Texas
- County: Panola
- Time zone: UTC-6 (Central (CST))
  - Summer (DST): UTC-5 (CDT)
- ZIP code: 75637
- Area codes: 903, 430
- GNIS feature ID: 1379556

Clayton is an unincorporated community in Panola County, Texas, United States. According to the Handbook of Texas, the community had an estimated population of 79 in 2000.

== History ==
The area was first settled around 1845 by Georgia native Jacob Cariker. He constructed a house two miles (3.2 km) southwest of Reed's Settlement, one of the earliest communities in Panola County. During the 1870s, most residents from Reed's Settlement had relocated to the Cariker site. A post office was established in 1874 under the name Clayton, after Clayton, Alabama, said to have been the origin of several early settlers. Clayton had a population of 130 in 1885. That number had risen to 200 by 1914. During the Great Depression, the population declined to 175 and steadily decreased thereafter. By the late 1960s, the number of inhabitants stood at 125. By 2000, Clayton had 79 residents and two businesses.

Clayton has a post office with the ZIP code 75637.

== Geography ==
Clayton is located at 32°05′54″N 94°28′30″W (32.0982190, −94.4749246). It is situated at the junction of State Highway 315 and FM 1970 in southwestern Panola County, approximately 16 miles (26 km) southwest of Carthage.

== Education ==
Public education in the community of Clayton is provided by the Carthage Independent School District.

Clayton once operated its own public school district. In May 1905, Clayton School District #11 was created. It was defined and organized in February 1907. The district consolidated with Carthage in 1965.

== Notable person ==
- Margie Neal, first woman elected to the Texas State Senate, was born near Clayton in 1875.

== See also ==
- List of unincorporated communities in Texas
