= KJ Edwards =

American football player (born 2007)

No. 0 – Texas A&M Aggies
- Position: Running back
- Class: Freshman

Personal information
- Born: October 2, 2007 (age 19)
- Listed height: 5 ft 10 in (1.78 m)
- Listed weight: 197 lb (89 kg)

Career information
- High school: Carthage (Carthage, Texas)
- College: Texas A&M (2026–present)
- Stats at ESPN

KJ Edwards (born October 2, 2007) is an American college football running back for the Texas A&M Aggies.

== Early life ==
Edwards attended Carthage High School in Carthage, Texas. As a junior in 2024, he had 142 carries for 1,789 yards with 23 touchdowns, and 30 receptions for 383 yards and three touchdowns. He rushed for 2,085 yards on 151 carries with 31 touchdowns his senior year and became the schools all time leading rusher during season. Edwards committed to Texas A&M University to play college football and college baseball.

== College career ==
Edwards competed for playing time his freshman year at Texas A&M in 2026. Against the Arkansas Razorbacks he rushed 11 times for 66 yards and scored his first two career touchdowns.
