= Daniels, Panola County, Texas =

Daniels
- Unincorporated community
- Interactive map of Daniels
- Location within Texas Daniels (the United States)
- Coordinates: 32°3′58″N 94°22′31″W
- Country: United States
- State: Texas
- County: Panola County

Daniels is an unincorporated community located on Farm Road 10 in Panola County, Texas, United States.

== History ==
Daniels was established sometime after the American Civil War. By the mid-1930s, amenities such as houses, a school, a church, and a store were available in the community, in which the school would then be consolidated into the Carthage Independent School District. Only a few houses, a church, and a store remained by the early 1970s.
