= Centennial, Texas =

- Unincorporated community
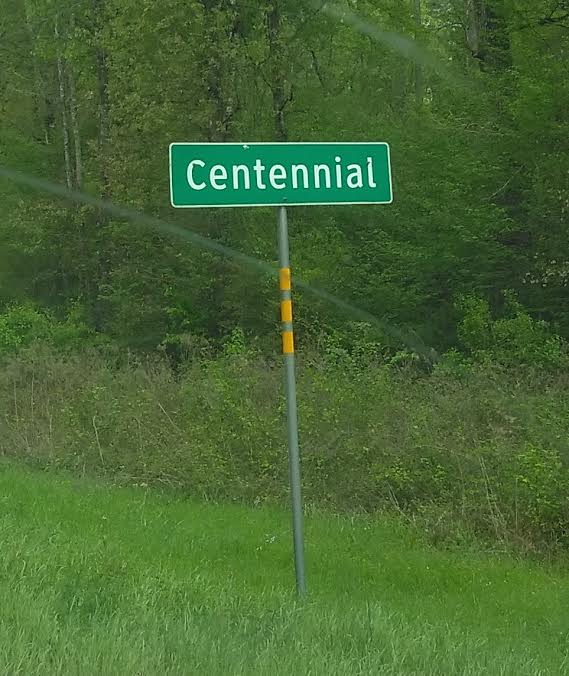
- Centennial, Texas road sign
- Interactive map of Centennial, Texas
- Coordinates: 32°13′33″N 94°04′58″W
- Country: United States
- State: Texas
- Parish/County: Panola County, Texas
- Founded: 1850
- Elevation: 328 ft (100 m)
- Time zone: UTC-6 (CST)
  - Summer (DST): UTC-5 (CDT)
- Area code: 903
- Website: centennialtexasonline.com

Centennial is an unincorporated community in Panola County, Texas, United States, on FM 123.

== History ==
Centennial was founded prior to 1850. The community’s first school was founded in 1867, additionally serving as a church called Centennial ME Church. Its purpose was to be a school for white children and preaching for white individuals.

=== Post office ===
The community's post office operated from 1875 until 1913. The post office was closed on November 30, 1913, and mail sent to Midyett, TX. The Deberry, Texas, post office now services the community.

=== Harmony Church ===
In 1904, Harmony Colored Methodist Episcopal Church was founded by George Delaney, Albert Perkins, and William Townley. It was later relocated on land that was purchased and owned by George Delaney. During this time period, the church property served as a school for colored children, a Prince Hall Mason Lodge, an Eastern Star meeting site, and the founding home of the East Texas Burial Association and Funeral Home.

In 2010, the church was renamed Harmony Invisible Network after church trustees decided to leave the Christian Methodist Episcopal Church. The following year, the SJM Group (formerly The SJM Family Foundation) purchased the land from the United Methodist Church and renamed the church Harmony Centennial Methodist Evangelistic church.

=== Community cemetery ===
The Centennial Cemetery was organized in 1858. The cemetery was divided into two sides: White and Black. The latter is called Centennial Afro-American Cemetery.

According to Allee Simmons Jacobs McNamee, the community's long-time historian, preservationist, and also director of the SJM Group, in the beginning of the (black) cemetery, family and friends of the deceased would dig the graves and make homemade caskets, and had walking processionals to the cemetery (later, the casket was pulled by mules). The deceased were buried the next day with their heads facing east. This burial practice was used because most slaves felt they would obtain freedom after death and this position would cause them to be ready when the angel Gabriel would blow his trumpet at the resurrection.

They used broken plates, saucers, jars, and pitchers as headstones. At the gravesite service, they sang songs such as "Go Down Moses”, “Swing Low, Sweet Chariot”, and “Shine on Me”.

The Centennial Afro-American Cemetery was designated as a Texas Historical Cemetery by the Texas Historical Commission in 2009. The campaign for the cemetery to receive state recognition was spearhead by the SJM Group (formerly the SJM Family Foundation and Talbert Preservation Group).

== The village of Centennial ==
Centennial is now considered a village community. It was officially adopted through the Texas State Historical Association by the SJM Group (formerly the SJM Foundation).

== Economy ==
Centennial is home to the Tyson Foods Centennial farm plant. Tyson Foods is one of the leading processors and marketers of chicken, pork, and beef.
