= Methodist Church Concord =

Historic church in Texas, United States

- U.S. National Register of Historic Places
- Recorded Texas Historic Landmark
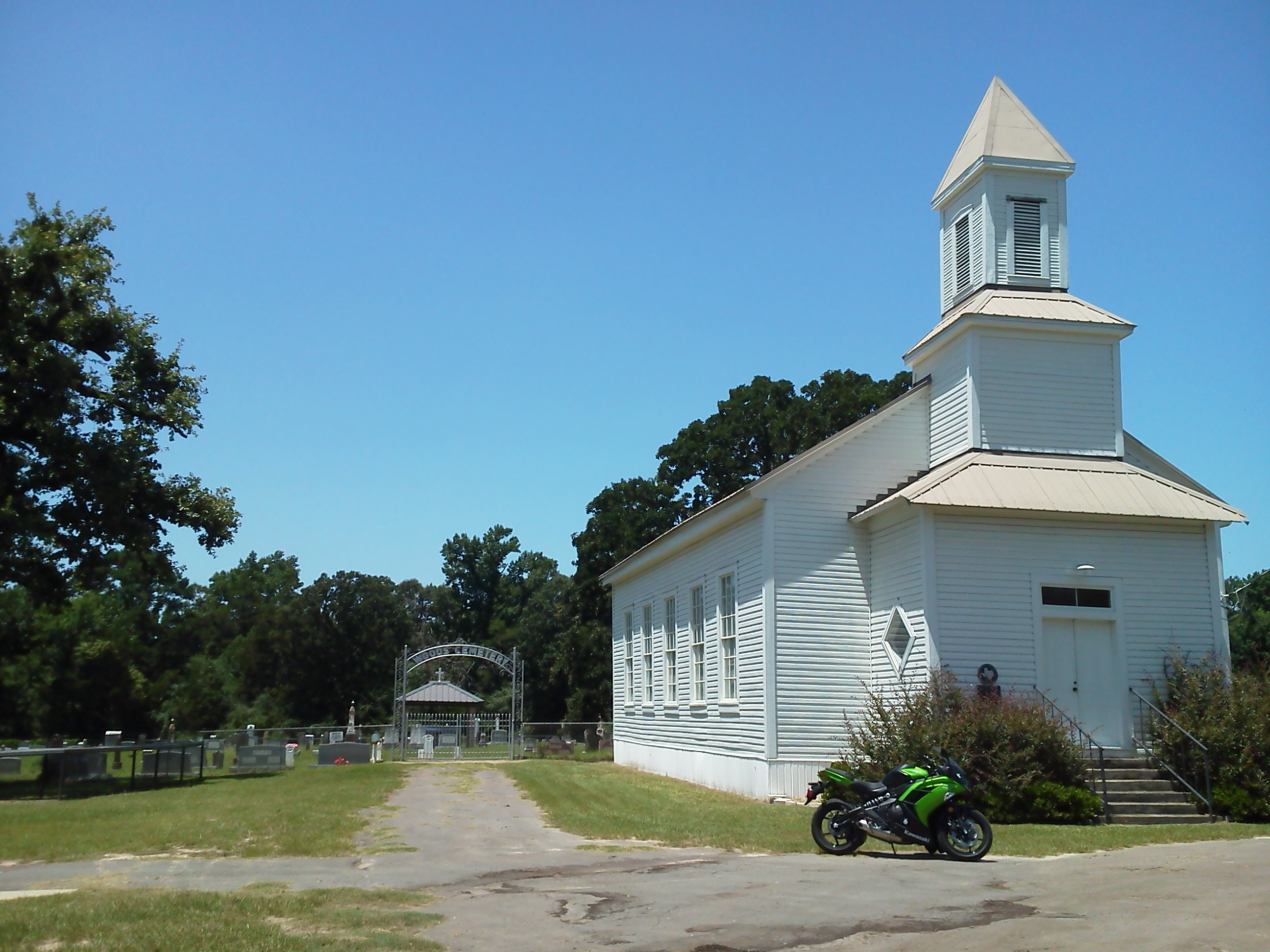
- Methodist Church Concord in 2014

- Location within Texas Location within the United States
- Nearest city: Carthage, Texas
- Coordinates: 32°0′24″N 94°14′50″W
- Area: 3.4 acres (1.4 ha)
- Built: 1876
- Architect: Multiple
- NRHP reference No.: 80004144
- RTHL No.: 10851

Significant dates
- Added to NRHP: September 8, 1980
- Designated RTHL: 1970

Methodist Church Concord (Woods Methodist Church) is a historic church near Carthage, Texas.

It was built in 1876 and added to the National Register in 1980.

== See also ==
- National Register of Historic Places listings in Panola County, Texas
- Recorded Texas Historic Landmarks in Panola County
