= Ajax, Texas =

Ghost town in Texas, US

Ajax is a ghost town in Panola County, Texas, United States. Settled in the late 1890s, a post office operated from 1900 until 1907, when it closed and mail was rerouted to Tacoma. It was abandoned by the mid-1930s.
