= Adams Store, Texas =

Ghost town in Texas, US

- Unincorporated community
- Location within Texas
- Coordinates: 32.29748300°N 94.09698600°W
- Country: United States
- State: Texas
- County: Panola

Adams Store is an unincorporated community in Panola County, Texas, United States. Situated off U.S. Route 79, it was settled in the early 1900s as a logging operation. In 1940, the population was 25, and 50 in 1965. As of 2009, the population was 12.
