= Galloway, Texas =

Unincorporated community in Texas, US

Coordinates: 32°02′54″N 94°04′51″W

Location of Galloway within the state of Texas

Galloway or Gallaway is a rural unincorporated community in southeastern Panola County, Texas, United States, on Farm to Market Road 31, 17 miles (27 km) southeast of Carthage and 2 miles (3 km) from the Louisiana state line and De Soto Parish.

The town was founded shortly after the Civil War. A school was opened in the early 1880s and by 1897 had an enrollment of 30 students. By the mid-1930s and the Great Depression, the town also had a church, general store, and a number of houses.

After World War II, the Galloway school district was merged with that of Carthage, but in the 1960s the town had retained enough population to support the church, a community center, and several small businesses. The town is now fairly dispersed with an estimated population of 71 at both the 1990 and 2000 censuses.

== Notable person ==
Galloway is the birthplace of country music singer Jim Reeves.
