= Margie Neal =

American journalist and politician

- Born: Margie Elizabeth Neal; April 20, 1875; Clayton, Texas, US
- Died: December 19, 1971 (aged 96); Carthage, Texas, US
- Occupations: Journalist, Politician

Margie Elizabeth Neal (April 20, 1875 – December 19, 1971) was a Texas journalist and politician. She was the first woman elected to the Texas State Senate, in 1926.

== Early life and education ==
Neal was born near Clayton, Texas, and was the daughter of William Lafayette and Martha (Gholston) Neal, who had both come to Texas from Georgia in search of better opportunities. Second of four children, she lived in nearby Carthage for much of her life. It was in Carthage that she had her first encounter with state politics, when Governor of Texas John Ireland came to speak in 1885 or 1886; she would later speak of the impression which his visit had made on her. She attended Sam Houston State Teachers College, but did not graduate.

== Career ==
She spent a short time teaching in her native Panola County and in Fort Worth before returning to Carthage in 1903; even so, she retained an interest in education for the remainder of her life. Her return was due primarily to the failing health of her mother. Her father had purchased the local weekly newspaper, the Texas Mule, and she became its editor and publisher. She renamed it the East Texas Register and helmed it until its sale in 1911. She was one of the first women in Texas to publish a newspaper, and was known for her progressivism. Neal was heavily active in local civic affairs from early in her career. In 1921 she became the first woman on the board of regents of State Teachers Colleges, remaining in the position until 1927. She chaired efforts in her district to gain women's suffrage, and was the first woman in the county to vote. First woman on the State Democratic Executive Committee, she was a delegate to the 1920 Democratic National Convention in San Francisco. She also was a board member of the Texas Society for Crippled Children.

In 1926, Neal was elected from Panola County as a Texas State Senator; she would go on to serve four terms. It was her passion for education which took her to Austin; her frustration at the legislature's inability to raise the standard of academics led to her decision to run, which was supported by her family. Hers was the bill that, in 1928, created the Texas State Board of Education, and she sponsored a bill introducing physical education into schools. She supported mandatory study of both state and national constitutions, and was crucial to passage of legislation appropriating funds for rural schools.

Additionally, Neal assisted in crafting legislation to assist in the rehabilitation of disabled people. She was also instrumental in getting the Texas Legislature to accept twenty-three donated parcels of land that formed the foundation of the Texas State Parks system.

Neal was the only woman in the entire legislature for the first of her four terms; she remained the only woman in the Senate until her departure. For much of her political career she supported the work of Governor Dan Moody.

Neal was an alternate delegate-at-large to the 1928 Democratic National Convention; though she did not support the nomination of Al Smith as the party's candidate, she did support him once his nomination was secure; many of her fellow Texans did not. She was a delegate again to the convention in 1932, and with Henry Pomeroy Miller spearheaded the Roosevelt-Garner ticket's efforts in Texas. She next traveled to Washington, D.C. in 1935 to begin a career with the National Recovery Administration and Social Security Administration. She secured a transfer back to her home state, working in San Antonio and Dallas as a community facilities analyst with the Manpower Commission. Upon her resignation in 1945 she returned to Carthage, where she remained active in the community. She never married. On June 15, 1952, a party was held in her honor in her hometown; among the speakers were then-Senator Lyndon B. Johnson, Governor Allan Shivers, and Oveta Culp Hobby; Hobby had known her since her time in the State Senate.

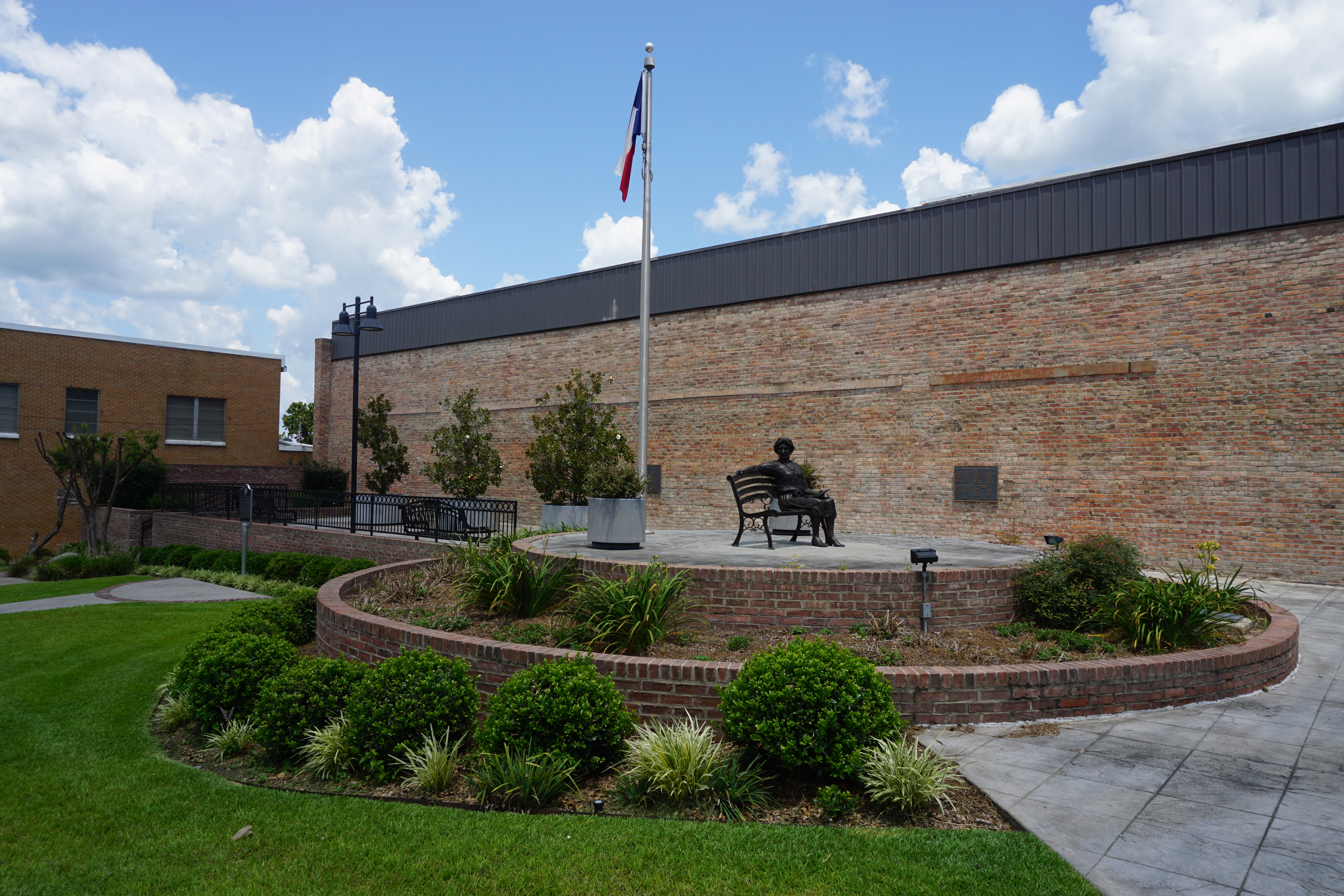
Senator Margie Neal Park in Carthage, Texas

== Death and legacy ==
Neal died in Carthage in 1971. She is buried there in the Oddfellows Cemetery. Her archive is held at the Dolph Briscoe Center for American History at the University of Texas at Austin. A Texas Historical Marker in Carthage honors her achievements.

== See also ==
- Edith Wilmans, first woman elected to the Texas House of Representatives and to the Texas Legislature as a whole
