= John Booty =

American football player (born 1965)

- Booty in 2026

No. 42, 41, 44
- Position: Safety

Personal information
- Born: October 9, 1965 (age 61); DeBerry, Texas, U.S.
- Listed height: 6 ft 0 in (1.83 m)
- Listed weight: 185 lb (84 kg)

Career information
- High school: Carthage (Carthage, Texas)
- College: TCU
- NFL draft: 1988: 10th round, 257th overall pick

Career history
- New York Jets (1988–1990); Philadelphia Eagles (1991–1992); Phoenix Cardinals (1993); New York Giants (1994); Tampa Bay Buccaneers (1995)

Career NFL statistics
- Tackles: 327
- Interceptions: 14
- Fumble recoveries: 6
- Stats at Pro Football Reference

John Fitzgerald Booty (born October 9, 1965) is an American former professional football player who was a defensive back in the National Football League (NFL) for the New York Jets, Philadelphia Eagles, Phoenix Cardinals, New York Giants, and Tampa Bay Buccaneers. He played college football for the TCU Horned Frogs and was selected in the 10th round of the 1988 NFL draft.

In 1995, Booty caught a 48-yard touchdown pass from punter Reggie Roby while playing for the Buccaneers.
