= Midyett, Texas =

Unincorporated community in Texas, US

Midyett
- Unincorporated community
- Location in Texas
- Coordinates: 32.23516020°N 94.16769140°W
- Country: United States
- State: Texas
- County: Panola
- Elevation: 315 ft (96 m)
- USGS Feature ID: 2034795

Midyett, also Breckenridge Springs and Grover, is an unincorporated community in Panola County, Texas, United States.

== History ==
Midyett is situated on the junction of Farm to Market Road 31 and 123. It was settled in 1850 by planters from DeBerry, Texas. The post office operated from 1887 to 1920; its first postmaster was Spencer Midyett, who named the town after himself. By 1914, the town had a population of 100, and a sawmill, two stores and two schools. Most of the population moved after World War II.
