= Old Center, Texas =

Unincorporated community in Texas, US

Old Center
- Unincorporated community
- Location in Texas
- Coordinates: 32.0059999°N 94.1882509°W
- Country: United States
- State: Texas
- County: Panola
- Elevation: 299 ft (91 m)

Population (2000)
  - Total: 83

Old Center is an unincorporated community in Panola County, Texas, United States.

== History ==
Old Center is situated on Farm to Market Road 699. It was founded in 1856 by James Rowe and his brother. The town had a cemetery, church, school and tannery. In the 1940s, the school was consolidated with Carthage. By 2000, the town had a population of 83.
