= Moochie Dixon =

American football player (born 2002)

Savannah Leprechauns
- Position: Wide receiver

Personal information
- Born: September 17, 2001 (age 25); Carthage, Texas, U.S.
- Listed height: 6 ft 0 in (1.83 m)
- Listed weight: 187 lb (85 kg)

Career information
- High school: Carthage (TX)
- College: Texas (2020–2021); SMU (2022–2024)
- NFL draft: 2025: undrafted

Career history
- New Orleans Saints (2025)*; Hamilton Tiger-Cats (2025)*; Savannah Leprechauns (2027–)
- * Offseason or practice squad member only

Kelvontay "Moochie" Dixon (born September 17, 2001) /ˈmuːtʃiˈdɪksən/ MOO-chee-DIK-sən, is an American professional football wide receiver currently playing for the Savannah Leprechauns of the Indoor Football League. He played college football for the Texas Longhorns and SMU Mustangs.

== Early life ==
Dixon was a wide receiver at Carthage High School in Carthage, Texas. As a junior in 2018, Carthage had a 14–1 record. As a senior in 2019, Dixon recorded 74 receptions for 1,240 yards and 20 touchdowns as Carthage went 16–0 and won the 4A Division 1 state championship.

== College career ==
Dixon enrolled at the University of Texas in 2020. As a freshman, he played in 3 games, starting 1, with 3 receptions for 76 yards, including a 73-yard touchdown in the Valero Alamo Bowl. In 2021, as a redshirt freshman, he played in all 12 games, recording 9 receptions for 100 yards.

He transferred to Southern Methodist University for the 2022 season. As a sophomore, he played in all 13 games, starting 1, with 28 receptions for 378 yards and 3 touchdowns, plus 2 punt returns for 39 yards. In 2023, as a junior, he played in all 14 games, starting 5, with 28 receptions for 441 yards and 4 touchdowns. In 2024, as a senior, he played in 13 games, starting 8, with 21 receptions for 386 yards and 1 touchdown, including an 87-yard touchdown against Stanford.

== Professional career ==
Pre-draft measurables
Height	Weight	Arm length	Hand span	40-yard dash	10-yard split	20-yard split	20-yard shuttle	Three-cone drill	Vertical jump	Broad jump	Bench press
5 ft 11 in (1.80 m)	183 lb (83 kg)	30 3/8 in (0.77 m)	9 1/2 in (0.24 m)	4.38 s	1.62 s	2.59 s	4.37 s	7.15 s	36.0 in (0.91 m)	10 ft 10 in (3.30 m)	14 reps
All values from Pro Day

=== New Orleans Saints ===
After going undrafted in the 2025 NFL draft, Dixon signed with the New Orleans Saints as an undrafted free agent. He was waived on August 25.

=== Hamilton Tiger-Cats ===
On October 29, 2025, Dixon was signed to the practice roster of the Hamilton Tiger-Cats of the Canadian Football League (CFL).

Dixon was released by the Tiger-Cats on May 31, 2026, as part of final roster cuts.

=== Savannah Leprechauns ===
On October 8, Dixon was signed to the Savannah Leprechauns of the Indoor Football League for the team's inaugural 2027 season; the team announced the signing on October 12.

== Personal life ==
Dixon is the younger brother of current NFL running back Keaontay Ingram.
