= Riderville, Texas =

Unincorporated community in Texas, US

Riderville
- Unincorporated community
- Location in Texas
- Coordinates: 32.1932163°N 94.3815875°W
- Country: United States
- State: Texas
- County: Panola
- Elevation: 289 ft (88 m)

Population (2000)
  - Total: 50
- USGS Feature ID: 1380438
- Census Code: 61952

Riderville is an unincorporated community in Panola County, Texas, United States.

== History ==
Riderville is situated on Texas State Highway 149, and was founded after the American Civil War. As of 2000, it had a population of 50.
