= Grand Bluff, Texas =

Unincorporated community in Texas, US

Grand Bluff
- Unincorporated community
- Location in Texas
- Coordinates: 32.2718251°N 94.3432523°W
- Elevation: 92 m (302 ft)

Population (2000)
  - Total: 87
- USGS Feature ID: 1358252
- Census Code: 30428
- Class Code: U6

Grand Bluff is an unincorporated community in Panola County, Texas, United States.

== History ==
Grand Bluff is situated on Farm to Market Road 2792 and the banks of the Sabine River. It was established in the 1840s, and a post office operated from 1847 to 1887. By the mid 1880s, it had a church, cotton gin, general store, sawmill, school and a population of 200. As of 2000, the population was 97.
