= Jack Boynton Strong =

American politician

Jack Boynton Strong (February 18, 1930 – July 28, 2015) was an American politician and lawyer.

Born in Carthage, Texas, Strong graduated from Carthage High School. He then went to Lon Morris College. Strong received his bachelor's degree from University of Texas at Austin and his law degree from University of Texas School of Law. Strong then practiced law in Longview, Texas and was in the real estate business. Strong served in the Texas Senate between 1963 and 1971 and was a Democrat He then served on the Texas Board of Education from 1971 to 1979. Strong died in Longview, Texas.
