= Center Point, Panola County, Texas =

Ghost town in Texas, US

Center Point
- Location in Texas
- Coordinates: 32.33348920°N 94.46686730°W
- Country: United States
- State: Texas
- County: Panola
- USGS Feature ID: 2034842

Center Point is a ghost town in Panola County, Texas, United States.

== History ==
Center Point is situated on Farm to Market Road 959. It was founded after the American Civil War. Most of the population moved after World War II. The town was abandoned by 2000.
