= Texas Country Music Hall of Fame =

Museum in Carthage, Texas, US

Coordinates: 32.1574°N 94.3417°W

Texas Country Music Hall of Fame

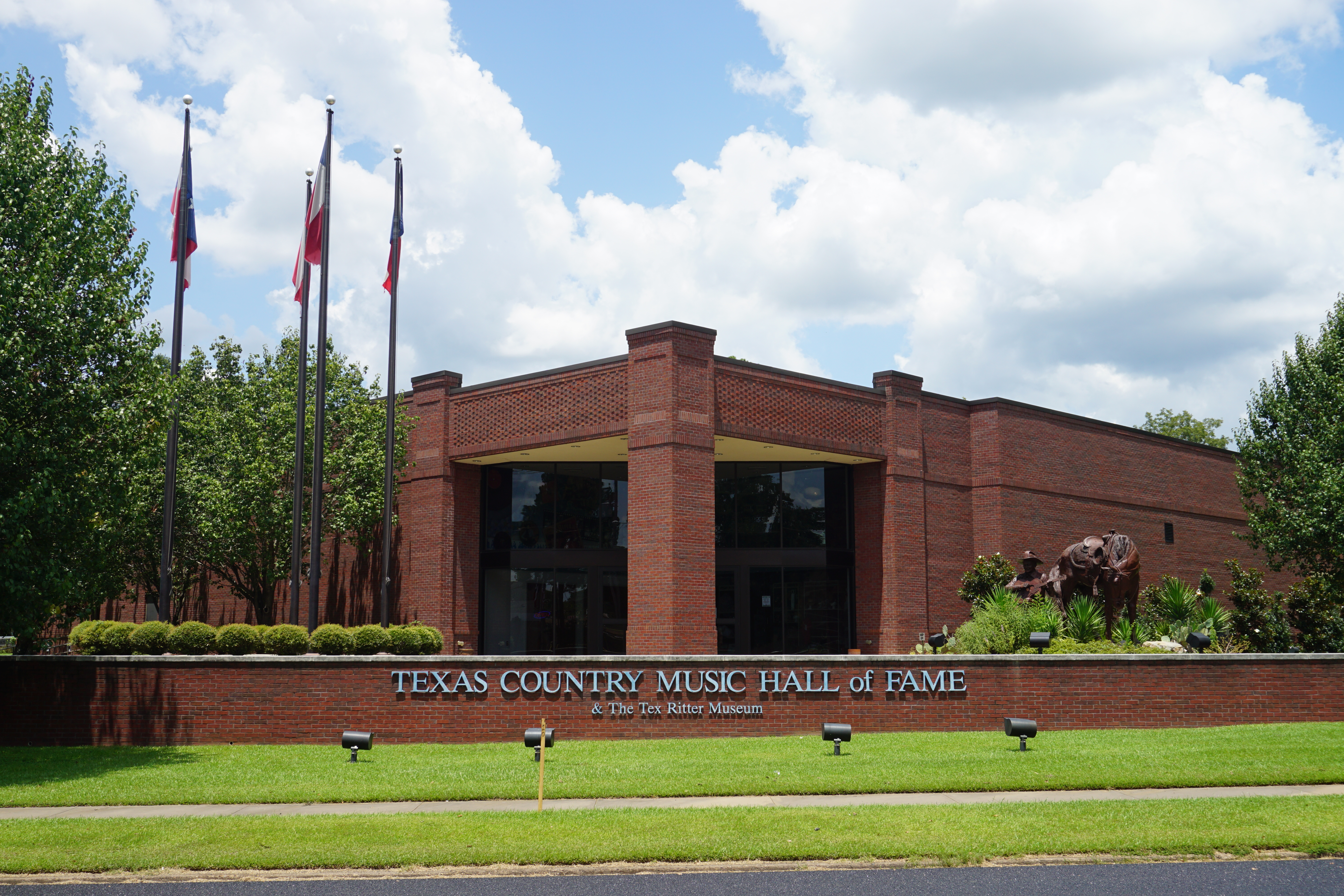
Front entrance to the Hall of Fame

The Texas Country Music Hall of Fame, located in Carthage in Panola County in East Texas, honors those who have made outstanding contributions to country music and were born (and/or raised) in the state of Texas. This includes singers, songwriters, disc jockeys, and others.

In the center of the exhibit area, a replica of a 1930s theater marquee reminds visitors of the role of country music in film. A juke box nearby allows visitors to select the country songs that they wish to hear played while touring the museum.

The marquee serves as the entrance to the Tex Ritter Museum. A native of Panola County, Ritter was one of the first singers inducted into the hall of fame when it was established in 1998. It also has an exhibit on Ritter's son, John Ritter.

== Inductees ==
1998

- Tex Ritter
- Willie Nelson
- Jim Reeves
- Gene Autry
- Joe Allison
- Cindy Walker

1999

- Ernest Tubb
- Hank Thompson
- Waylon Jennings

2000

- Dale Evans
- Bob Wills
- Charlie Walker

2001

- Stuart Hamblin
- Billy Walker
- Ray Price

2002

- Tanya Tucker
- Gene Watson
- Nat Stuckey

2003

- Kris Kristofferson
- Lefty Frizzell
- Johnny Bush

2004

- The Big Bopper
- Johnny Lee
- Mac Davis

2005

- Roger Miller
- Jimmy Dean
- Johnny Gimble
- Glenn Sutton

2006

- The Gatlin Brothers
- Billy Joe Shaver

2007

- Johnny Rodriguez
- Red Steagall
- Bob Luman

2008

- Mickey Newbury
- Buck Owens
- The Whites

2009

- Linda Davis
- Michael Martin Murphey
- Neal McCoy

2010

- George Jones
- Al Dexter
- Ray Winkler

2011

- Mickey Gilley
- Moe Bandy

2014

- Duane Allen and the Oak Ridge Boys

2015

- Tracy Byrd
- Dallas Wayne

2016

- Clint Black

2017

- Kenny Rogers
- Bobbie Nelson

2018

- Leon Rausch
- The Chuck Wagon Gang

2019

- Jeannie C. Riley
- Rodney Crowell
- Claude Gray

2022

- David Frizzell
- The Texas Tenors
- Buddy Holly

2023

- Clay Cooper
- K.T. Oslin

2024

- Tracy Lawrence
- The Mandrell Sisters
- Roy Orbison

2025

- Johnny Horton
- Asleep at the Wheel

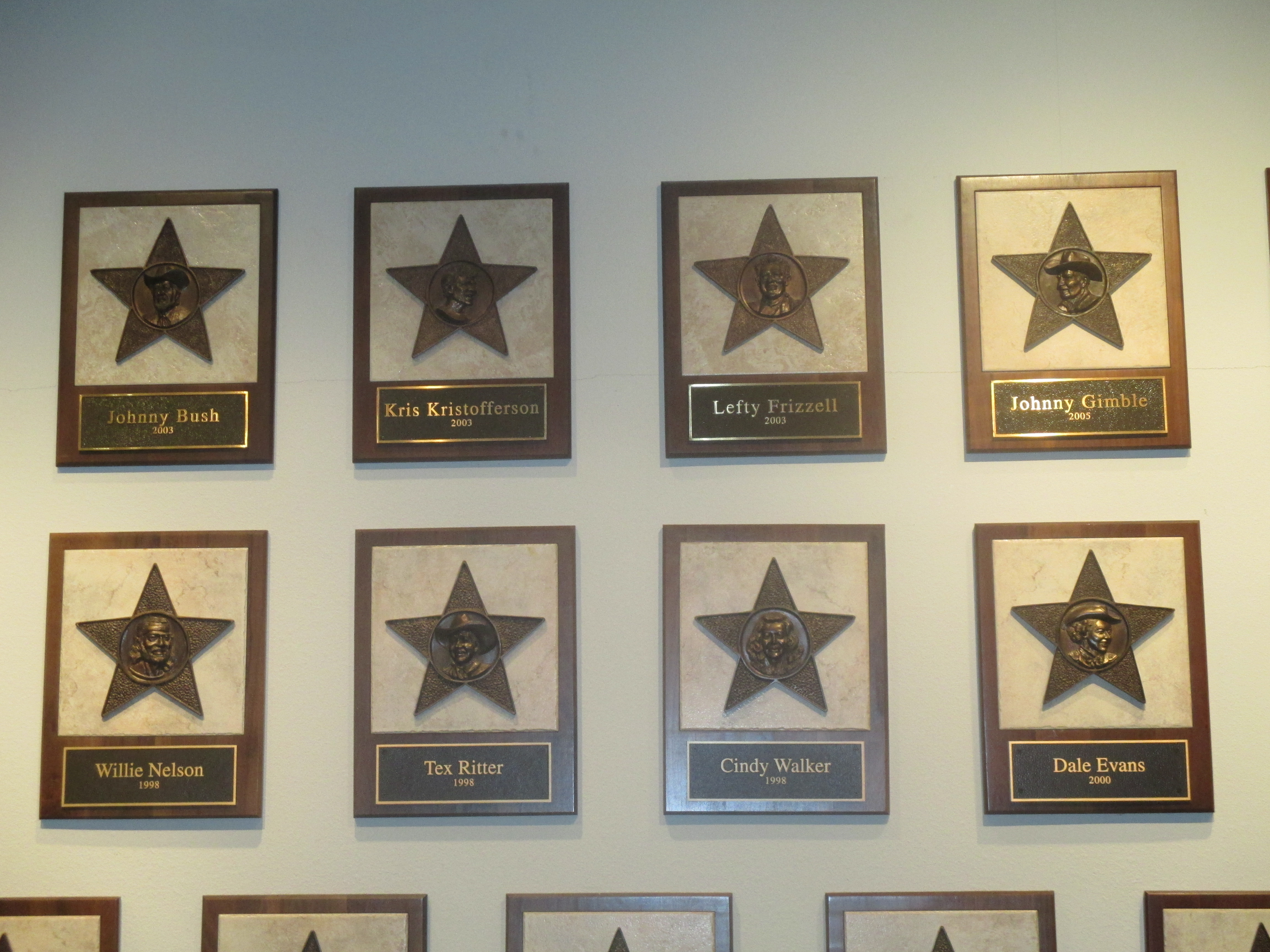
Some of the plaques of the inductees into the Texas Country Music Hall of Fame

== See also ==
- List of music museums
- List of museums in East Texas
