= Murvaul, Texas =

Unincorporated community in Texas, US

Coordinates: 32.0502°N 94.3766°W

Murvaul is a rural unincorporated community in south-central Panola County, Texas, United States, on Farm to Market Road 10 and Murvaul Creek, eight miles south of Carthage.

The area was settled by European-Americans in the early 1860s. A post office operated there from 1874 to 1880 and from 1899 to 1918. In 1882, the reported population was 200. Circa 1900, the community served as a stop on the Texas and Gulf Railroad.

By the early 1990s, only a few scattered dwellings remained.

It is the birthplace of Tex Ritter.
