= Keaontay Ingram =

American football player (born 1999)

Profile
- Position: Running back

Personal information
- Born: October 26, 1999 (age 27); Marshall, Texas, U.S.
- Listed height: 6 ft 0 in (1.83 m)
- Listed weight: 220 lb (100 kg)

Career information
- High school: Carthage (Carthage, Texas)
- College: Texas (2018–2020); USC (2021)
- NFL draft: 2022: 6th round, 201st overall pick

Career history
- Arizona Cardinals (2022–2023); Kansas City Chiefs (2023–2025)

Awards and highlights
- Super Bowl champion (LVIII)

Career NFL statistics as of 2025
- Rushing yards: 134
- Rushing average: 2.2
- Rushing touchdowns: 1
- Receptions: 8
- Receiving yards: 47
- Stats at Pro Football Reference

Keaontay Ingram (born October 26, 1999) is an American professional football running back who is currently a free agent. He played college football for the Texas Longhorns and USC Trojans.

== Early life ==
Ingram grew up in Carthage, Texas, and attended Carthage High School, where he played football, ran track and played basketball. He won a 4A Division I state title in 2016, while being named Offensive MVP of the championship game. In 2017, he helped Carthage to a 16–0 overall record, including a 6–0 district mark, a district title, and a 49–21 win over Kennedale in the 4A Division I state title game.

He was one of three finalists for the Mr. Texas Football High School Player of the Year Award. He played in the 2018 Under Armour All-America Game. He was an All-America, all-state and two-time all-district honoree. He holds the Carthage school record for career rushing touchdowns with 76. He is one of three athletes with more than 5,000 career yards, and one of two to have back-to-back 2,000-yard seasons.

Ingram was rated a four-star recruit and committed to play college football at Texas over scholarship offers from 26 other programs.

== College career ==
In his first year at Texas he played 13 games and started two of them. He rushed a total of 708 yards, had three touchdowns and added 27 receptions for 170 yards and two scores. In the 2018 Big 12 Championship Game he rushed for seven yards in the loss to Oklahoma. In the 2019 Sugar Bowl, which Texas won over Georgia, he rushed 25 yards and added three catches for 24 yards. As a sophomore, he played and started 13 games in which he rushed 853 yards and had six touchdowns. He caught 29 passes for 242 yards and three touchdowns. He rushed 108 yards and also caught two passes for 26 yards and a touchdown in the 2019 Alamo Bowl which Texas defeated Utah by a score of 38–10. His four 100-yard games as a sophomore were the most by a Longhorn since D'Onta Foreman in 2016 and one of seven Longhorns to rush for more than 100 yards on at least four occasions during a single season since 2000. In the shortened season of 2020 he played six games and started three times. He rushed 250 yards for one touchdown, and caught 11 passes for 103 yards and one touchdown. He was selected that year to the Academic All-Big 12 First-team. And he was selected Big 12 Commissioner's Honor Roll in the springs of 2019 and 2020.

After three seasons at Texas, he transferred to USC, where he gained over 1,000 yards from scrimmage in his senior year. He rushed for 911 yards and 5 touchdowns and received for 156 yards. He appeared in 10 games and started in seven of them. His season ended early due to a season-ending rib injury. He earned 2021 All-Pac-12 honorable mention, Pro Football Focus All-Pac-12 second-team and Phil Steele All-Pac-12 fourth team. He won USC's 2021 Jack Oakie "Rise and Shine" Award. He was a 2022 NFLPA Collegiate Bowl and east–west Shrine Bowl invitee. He declared for the 2022 NFL draft in January.

=== Statistics ===
Season	Team	GP	GS	Rushing				Receiving		
Season	Team	GP	GS	Att	Yds	Avg	TD	Rec	Yds	TD
2018	Texas	13	2	142	708	5.0	3	27	170	2
2019	Texas	13	13	144	853	5.9	7	29	242	3
2020	Texas	6	3	53	250	4.7	1	11	103	1
2021	USC	10	7	156	911	5.8	5	22	156	5
Career		42	25	495	2,722	5.5	16	89	671	11

== Professional career ==
Pre-draft measurables
Height	Weight	Arm length	Hand span	Wingspan	40-yard dash	10-yard split	20-yard split	20-yard shuttle	Three-cone drill	Vertical jump	Broad jump	Bench press
5 ft 11 3/4 in (1.82 m)	221 lb (100 kg)	31 1/2 in (0.80 m)	9 in (0.23 m)	6 ft 2 7/8 in (1.90 m)	4.53 s	1.53 s	2.62 s	4.44 s	7.19 s	34.5 in (0.88 m)	10 ft 2 in (3.10 m)	23 reps
All values from NFL Combine/Pro Day

=== Arizona Cardinals ===
Ingram was selected by the Arizona Cardinals in the sixth round with the 201st pick of the 2022 NFL draft. He signed on May 19 with the Cardinals on a rookie contract of four years. He played his first game for Arizona in the first preseason game against the Cincinnati Bengals. In Week 6, Ingram made his NFL debut against the Seattle Seahawks. In the following game, against the New Orleans Saints, Ingram scored his first NFL touchdown in the 42–34 victory. On November 14, 2022, backup running back Eno Benjamin was released, making Ingram the backup in Arizona alongside former Chiefs running back Darrel Williams at backup. As a rookie, he appeared in 12 games.

On November 28, 2023, Ingram was released.

=== Kansas City Chiefs ===
Ingram was signed to the practice squad of the Kansas City Chiefs on November 30, 2023. Ingram became a Super Bowl champion when the Chiefs defeated the San Francisco 49ers in Super Bowl LVIII. Ingram signed a reserve/futures contract with the Chiefs on February 14, 2024.

Ingram was waived by the Chiefs on August 27, 2024, and re-signed to the practice squad. He was promoted to the active roster on September 18 and waived six days later. On September 26, Ingram re-signed with the practice squad. He signed a reserve/future contract on February 13, 2025.

== Personal life ==
Ingram is the older brother of current NFL wide receiver Moochie Dixon.
