= Deadwood, Texas =

- Unincorporated community
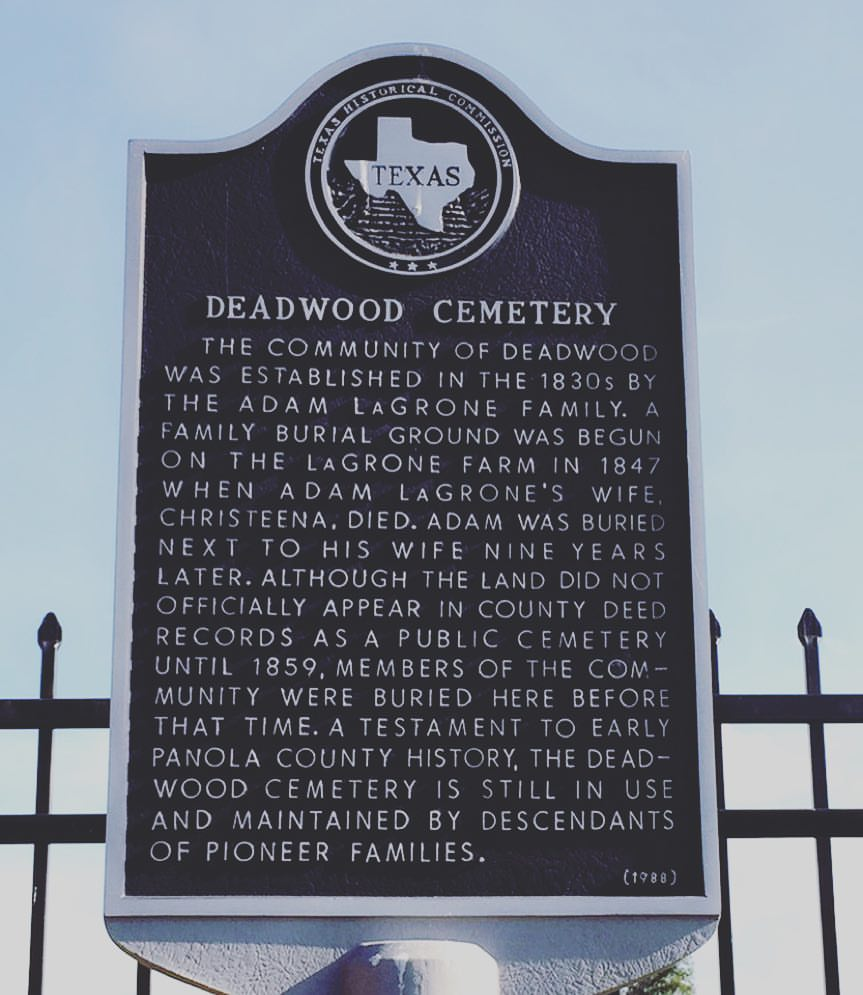
- Deadwood Cemetery was created when Christeena LaGrone was buried there in 1847. She and her husband were the first Anglos to live west of the Sabine River in Panola County, Texas.

- Location within Texas Location within the United States
- Coordinates: 32°08′24″N 94°08′31″W
- Country: United States
- State: Texas
- County: Panola
- Elevation: 266 ft (81 m)
- Time zone: UTC-6 (Central (CST))
  - Summer (DST): UTC-5 (CDT)
- Area codes: 430 & 903
- GNIS feature ID: 1379642

Deadwood (previously known as Linus) is an unincorporated community in Panola County, Texas, United States. The community is located at the intersection of Farm to Market Road 31 and Farm to Market Road 2517, about 10 miles (16 km) east of Carthage.

== History ==
The area was first settled in 1837 by Adam LaGrone and his family, who built a homestead not far from Socogee Creek, after they were granted around 10,000 acres from the Mexican government. Deadwood was the first community east of the Sabine River in Panola County. Men of the LaGrone family fought in the Texas Revolution, the Regulator-Moderator War, and the Civil War. After the end of the Civil War, a grandson of Adam, Confederate veteran Hiram Clark LaGrone, built a mill and gin that became the nucleus of the later town.

The LaGrone family still owns much of the original land grant and comprises most of the membership of Deadwood's two churches—the Deadwood Methodist Church and the Deadwood Pentecostal Church. The Rev. Charlie and Clara Alexander LaGrone Family Community Center adjoins the Deadwood Methodist Church. Locally, two LaGrone men, direct descendants of Deadwood's founder, sit on the Commissioners' Court of Panola County. The small settlement was originally known as Linus, but when residents applied for a post office in 1882, another town already had that name, and the new name Deadwood was chosen at a town meeting.

A family burial ground was begun on the LaGrone farm in 1847 when Adam LaGrone's wife, Christeena, died. Adam was buried next to his wife nine years later. Although the land did not officially appear in county deed records as a public cemetery until 1859, members of the community were buried here before that time. A testament to early Panola county history, the Deadwood cemetery is still in use and maintained by descendants of pioneer families.

By 1885 Deadwood had an estimated population of 50, two churches, a district school, and a steam cotton gin and gristmill. A hotel was built there around 1900, but went out of business a few years later; the local post office was discontinued in 1917. In the mid-1930s, Deadwood had a church, a school, and two stores; its reported population in 1936 was 125. After World War II, the community's school was consolidated with the Carthage district, and the remaining businesses at Deadwood closed.

In 1990, Deadwood was a dispersed rural community with a reported population of 106. The population remained unchanged in 2000.

In House of 1000 Corpses, the fictional town of Ruggsville is located near Deadwood.

American actor Powers Boothe is buried in Deadwood Cemetery.
