= Texas State Highway 315 =

State highway in Texas

State Highway 315
- SH 315, highlighted in red

Route information
- Maintained by TxDOT
- Length: 26.035 mi (41.899 km)
- Existed: 1939–present

Major junctions
- West end: US 259 in Mount Enterprise
- East end: Bus. US 79 in Carthage

Location
- Country: United States
- State: Texas
- Counties: Rusk, Panola

Highway system
- Highways in Texas; Interstate; US; State; Former; Toll; Loops; Spurs; FM/RM; Park; Rec
← SH 314	→ SH 316

State Highway 315 (SH 315) is a state highway in Texas that runs from Mount Enterprise northeast to Carthage.

== Route description ==
SH 315 begins at a junction with US 259 in Mount Enterprise. The route travels to the northeast through eastern Rusk County, intersecting FM 95 and FM 840. Continuing to the northeast, the highway enters Panola County, in which it has junctions with FM 348, FM 1971, and FM 1970 in the community of Clayton. SH 315 then enters Carthage, where it intersects SH 149. The route travels through the western portion of Carthage before reaching its eastern terminus at Bus. US 79.

== History ==
This route was not built, and was removed from the state highway system by 1939. SH 315 was designated on April 1, 1939 on its current route. When originally constructed, the route between Mount Enterprise and the former community of Shiloh, approximately 5.8 miles to the east, was the first road in the state's Farm to Market system; the extension of this road in April caused the cancellation of SH 215, a highway that followed a similar routing to the current route. This route became part of SH 315 during the 1939 redescription of the state highway system.

== Major intersections ==
County	Location	mi	km	Destinations	Notes
Rusk	Mount Enterprise	0.0	0.0	US 259 (Railroad Avenue) – Henderson, Nacogdoches	Western terminus
Rusk		3.4	5.5	FM 95	
Rusk		7.9	12.7	FM 840	
Panola		11.7	18.8	FM 348	
Panola		16.6	26.7	FM 1971	
Panola	Clayton	17.7	28.5	FM 1970	
Panola	Carthage	24.8	39.9	SH 149 (LaSalle Parkway)	
Panola	Carthage	26.0	41.8	Bus. US 79 (Panola Street)	Eastern terminus
1.000 mi = 1.609 km; 1.000 km = 0.621 mi
