= Gary Independent School District =

School district in Texas

Gary Independent School District is a public school district based in Gary, Texas (USA).

In 2009, the school district was rated "recognized" by the Texas Education Agency.
