= Brandon Rhyder =

American singer-songwriter

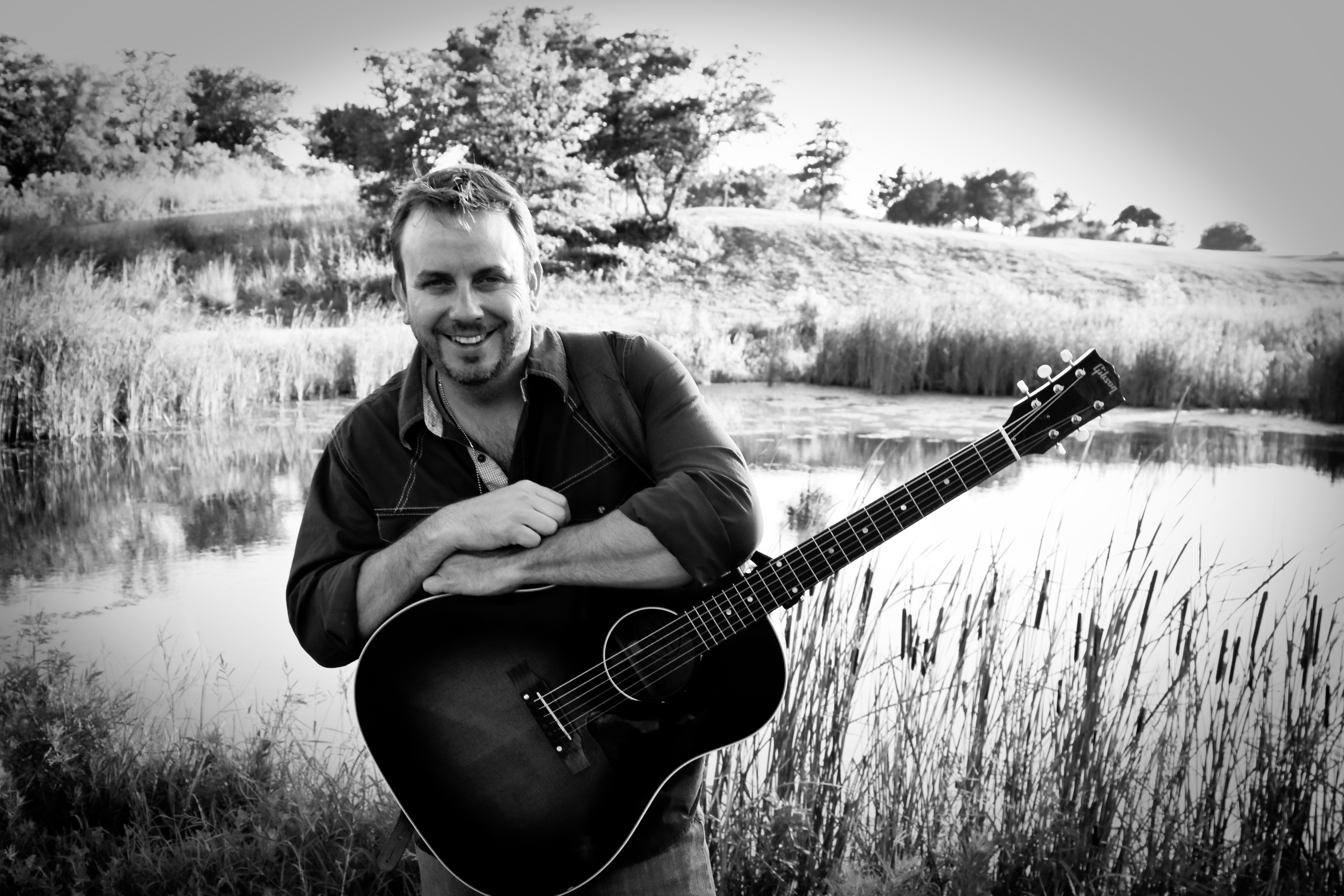
Brandon Ryder Cristina

Brandon Ryder Cristina is an American Texas Country/Red Dirt singer from Carthage, Texas, United States.

== Education ==
Rhyder graduated from the University of Texas at Tyler with a degree in Industrial Technology.

== Career ==
Rhyder released his first album, "Because She Loves Me" in May 2001. His second album, "Behind the Pine Curtain", was released in 2003. His third album, "Conviction", was released in August 2005 and produced by Walt Wilkins. This was the album that made heightened Brandon's stock in the Texas music scene. His fourth album, "Live" was released in 2007 on Nashville's Apex Records label. This album produced his first number one single on the Texas Country Music Chart, "Before I Knew Your Name". His fifth album, "Every Night", was released in 2008 and produced by Radney Foster. His sixth album, "Head Above Water", was released in February 2010 and produced by Walt Wilkins.

In February, 2010, Rhyder celebrated his fast rising single, “Rock Angel,” which landed in the coveted No. 1 spot for two weeks in a row on both the Texas Music chart and the Texas Regional Radio. This song is the lead track from his new disc Head Above Water that was released nationwide on February 16, 2010 via Thirty Tigers. Album also includes a bonus DVD featuring an exclusive behind-the-scenes documentary about the making of this disc.

Rhyder moved his booking to Red 11 in Nashville and released his fifth album in 2008, titled Every Night, with producer/co-writer Radney Foster. The record debuted at No. 53 on the Top Country Albums chart and at No. 50 on Billboard’s Top New Artist Albums chart. Every Night’s lead single, “This Ain’t It,” jumped to No. 5 on the Texas Music Chart and the accompanying video to "This Ain't It" was released in the summer of 2009. In May 2013, Rhyder released his new hit single "Haggard" and has set a release date for August 2013 for his eighth album.

To date, Rhyder has three singles in the Top 20, two in the Top 10, three in the Top 5, and two number ones with the singles “Rock Angel” and “Before I Knew Your Name.”

== Discography ==
=== Albums ===
Title	Album details	Peak chart positions	
Title	Album details	US Country	US Heat
Behind the Pine Curtain	Release date: May 1, 2003; Label: New Texas	—	—
Conviction	Release date: August 16, 2005; Label: Dogwood Hill	—	—
Live	Release date: August 21, 2007; Label: Apex Music	—	—
Every Night	Release date: August 19, 2008; Label: Thirty Tigers/Sony Red	53	50
Head Above Water	Release date: February 16, 2010; Label: Thirty Tigers/Sony Red	41	20
Live at Billy Bob's Texas	Release date: July 26, 2011; Label: Smith Music Group	—	—
That's Just Me	Release date: August 20, 2013; Label: Reserve Records	62	40
"—" denotes releases that did not chart

=== Music videos ===
Year	Video	Director
2008	"This Ain't It"	
2009	"Rock Angel"	Evan Kaufmann
2011	"Lord, I Hope This Day Is Good"	Zack Morris
2014	"Leave"	John H. Reynolds
2014	"That's Just Me"	Cameron Gott
2017	"They Need Each Other"	Kyle Hutton
