= Gary City, Texas =

Town in Panola County, Texas, United States

- Town
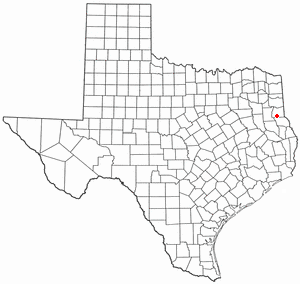
- Location of Gary City, Texas

- Coordinates: 32°01′46″N 94°22′32″W
- Country: United States
- State: Texas
- County: Panola

Area
  - Total: 1.90 sq mi (4.92 km^{2})
  - Land: 1.90 sq mi (4.92 km^{2})
  - Water: 0 sq mi (0.00 km^{2})
- Elevation: 302 ft (92 m)

Population (2020)
  - Total: 335
  - Density: 176/sq mi (68.1/km^{2})
- Time zone: UTC-6 (Central (CST))
  - Summer (DST): UTC-5 (CDT)
- ZIP code: 75643
- Area codes: 903, 430
- FIPS code: 48-29108
- GNIS feature ID: 2412672

Gary City is a town in Panola County, Texas, United States. The population was 335 as of the 2020 census.

== Geography ==
According to the United States Census Bureau, the town has a total area of 1.9 square miles (4.9 km^{2}), all land.

== Climate ==
The climate in this area is characterized by hot, humid summers and generally mild to cool winters. According to the Köppen Climate Classification system, Gary City has a humid subtropical climate, abbreviated "Cfa" on climate maps.

== Demographics ==
Historical population
Census	Pop.	Note	%±
1970	202		—
1980	322		59.4%
1990	271		−15.8%
2000	303		11.8%
2010	311		2.6%
2020	335		7.7%
U.S. Decennial Census; 2020 Census

As of the census of 2000, there were 303 people, 114 households, and 82 families residing in the town. The population density was 159.8 inhabitants per square mile (61.7/km^{2}). There were 131 housing units at an average density of 69.1 per square mile (26.7/km^{2}). The racial makeup of the town was 98.68% White, 0.33% African American, 0.33% Native American, 0.33% Asian, and 0.33% from two or more races. Hispanic or Latino of any race were 1.32% of the population.

There were 114 households, out of which 33.3% had children under the age of 18 living with them, 61.4% were married couples living together, 8.8% had a female householder with no husband present, and 27.2% were non-families. 24.6% of all households were made up of individuals, and 15.8% had someone living alone who was 65 years of age or older. The average household size was 2.66 and the average family size was 3.23.

In the town, the population was spread out, with 31.0% under the age of 18, 6.6% from 18 to 24, 25.1% from 25 to 44, 18.8% from 45 to 64, and 18.5% who were 65 years of age or older. The median age was 37 years. For every 100 females, there were 98.0 males. For every 100 females age 18 and over, there were 81.7 males.

The median income for a household in the town was $24,219, and the median income for a family was $34,531. Males had a median income of $31,250 versus $13,125 for females. The per capita income for the town was $17,151. About 14.1% of families and 20.2% of the population were below the poverty line, including 27.1% of those under the age of eighteen and 20.0% of those 65 or over.

== Education ==
The Town of Gary City is served by the Gary Independent School District.

== See also ==
- List of municipalities in Texas
