= Carthage Independent School District =

School district in Texas

Location
- 1 Bulldog Drive, Carthage, TX, 75633 United States of America

District information
- Grades: PK - 12
- Superintendent: Glenn Hambrick (interim)
- Budget: $38,221,675

Students and staff
- Students: 2,891
- Athletic conference: UIL Class 4A
- District mascot: Bulldogs
- Colors: Red & White

Other information
- Website: www.carthageisd.org

Carthage Independent School District (Carthage ISD or CISD) is a school district based in Carthage, Texas (USA). In 2009, the school district was rated "academically acceptable" by the Texas Education Agency.

== Schools ==
- Carthage High School (Grades 9-12)
- Carthage Junior High (Grades 7-8)
- Baker-Koonce Intermediate (Grades 4-6)
- Libby Elementary (Grades 2-3)
- Carthage Primary (Grades PK-1)

== Athletics ==
The high school football stadium partially collapsed on September 29, 2006. It was declared structurally unsound, and after a bond election approved funding a new stadium was completed in July 2008. The new Carthage Bulldog Stadium has a seating capacity of 6,000.
