= Panola County, Texas =

County in Texas, US

- County
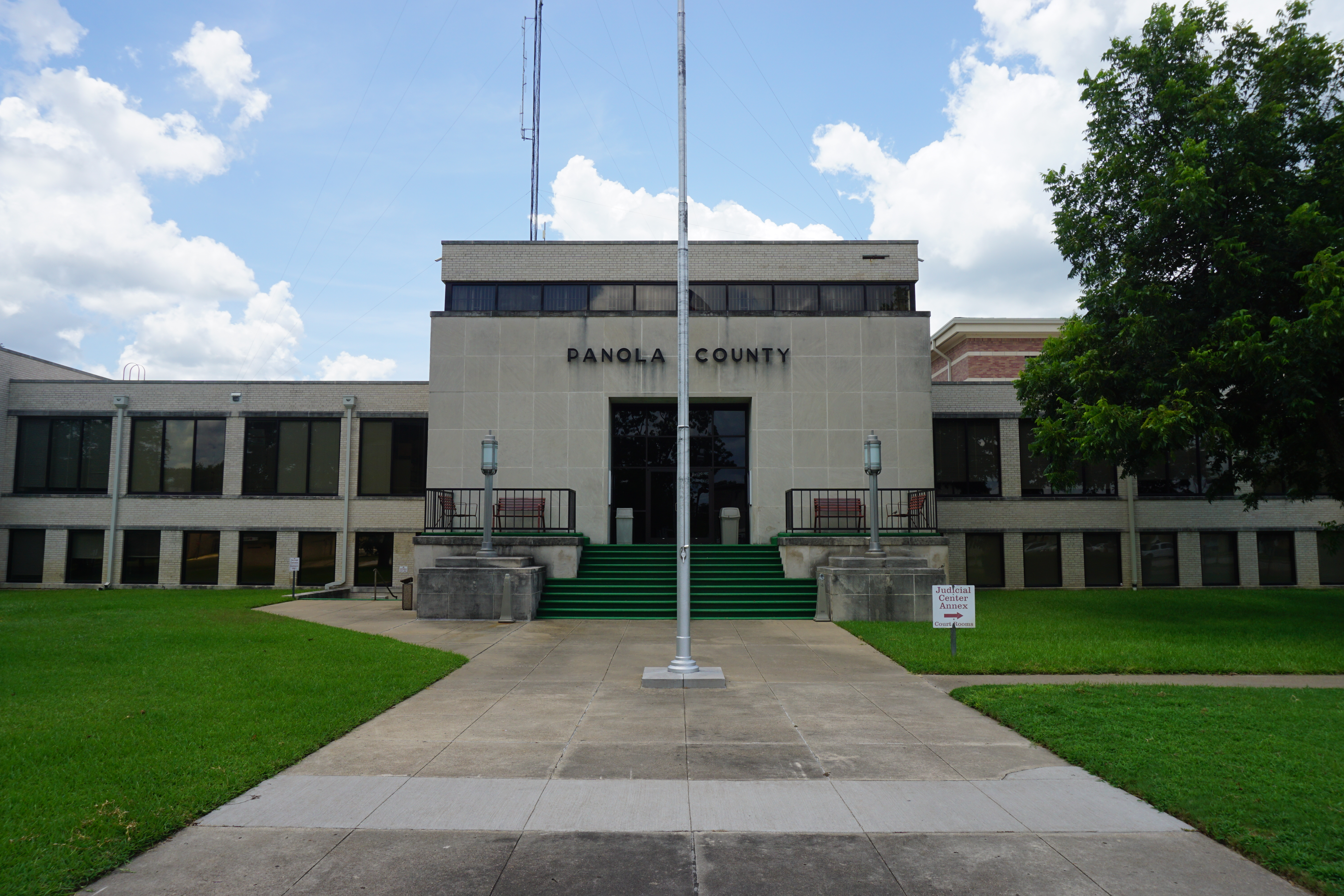
- The Panola County Courthouse in Carthage

- Location within the U.S. state of Texas
- Coordinates: 32°10′N 94°19′W
- Country: United States
- State: Texas
- Founded: 1846
- Seat: Carthage
- Largest city: Carthage

Area
  - Total: 821 sq mi (2,130 km^{2})
  - Land: 802 sq mi (2,080 km^{2})
  - Water: 20 sq mi (52 km^{2}) 2.4%

Population (2020)
  - Total: 22,491
  - Estimate (2025): 23,018 ▲
  - Density: 28.0/sq mi (10.8/km^{2})
- Time zone: UTC−6 (Central)
  - Summer (DST): UTC−5 (CDT)
- Congressional district: 1st
- Website: www.co.panola.tx.us

Panola County is a county located in the U.S. state of Texas. As of the 2020 census, its population was 22,491, with its county seat in Carthage. Located in East Texas and originally developed for cotton plantations, the county's name is derived from a Choctaw word for cotton.

Until 2013, Panola County was one of about 30 entirely dry counties in Texas: the sale of alcohol was restricted or prohibited.

== History ==
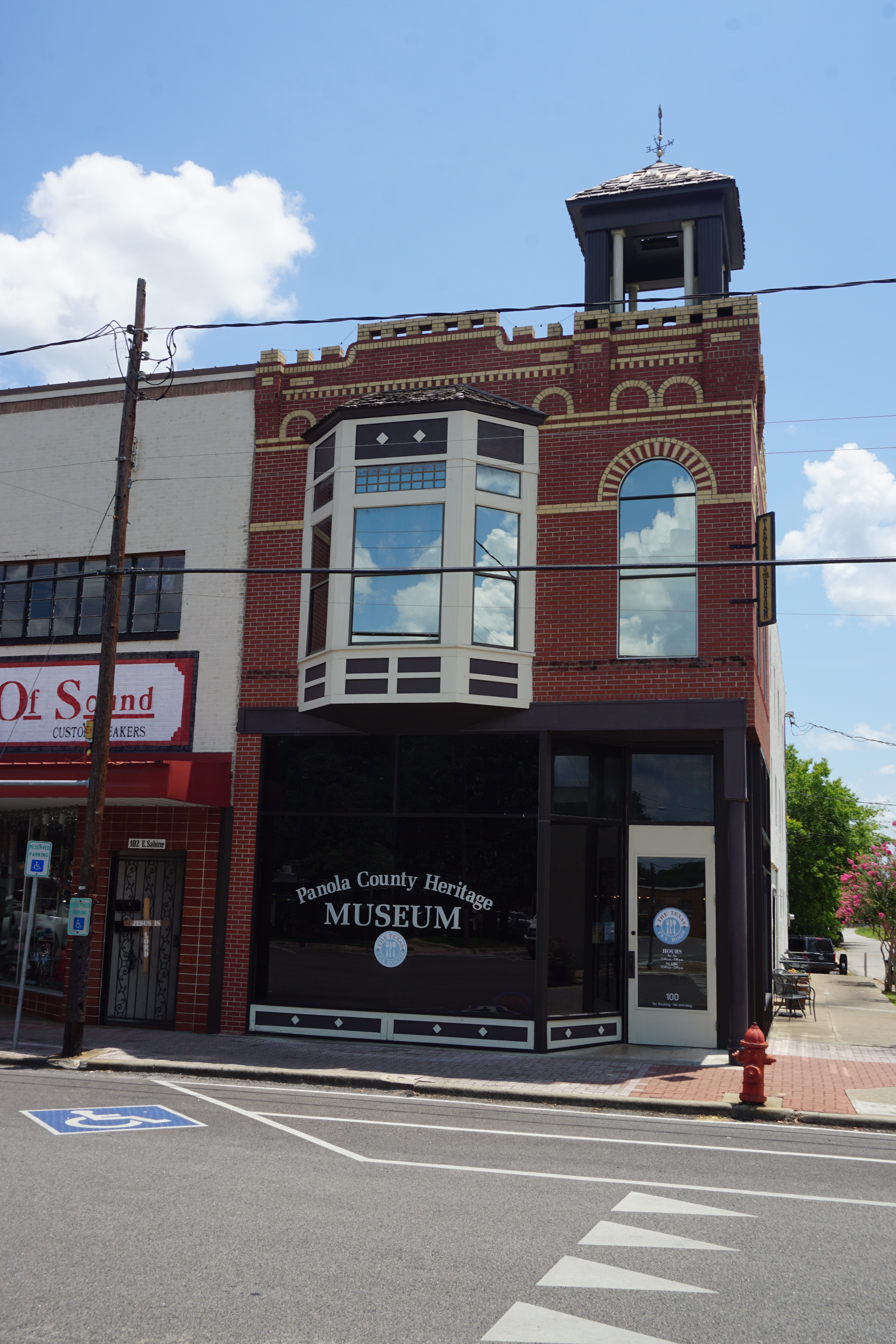
The Panola County Heritage Museum in downtown Carthage

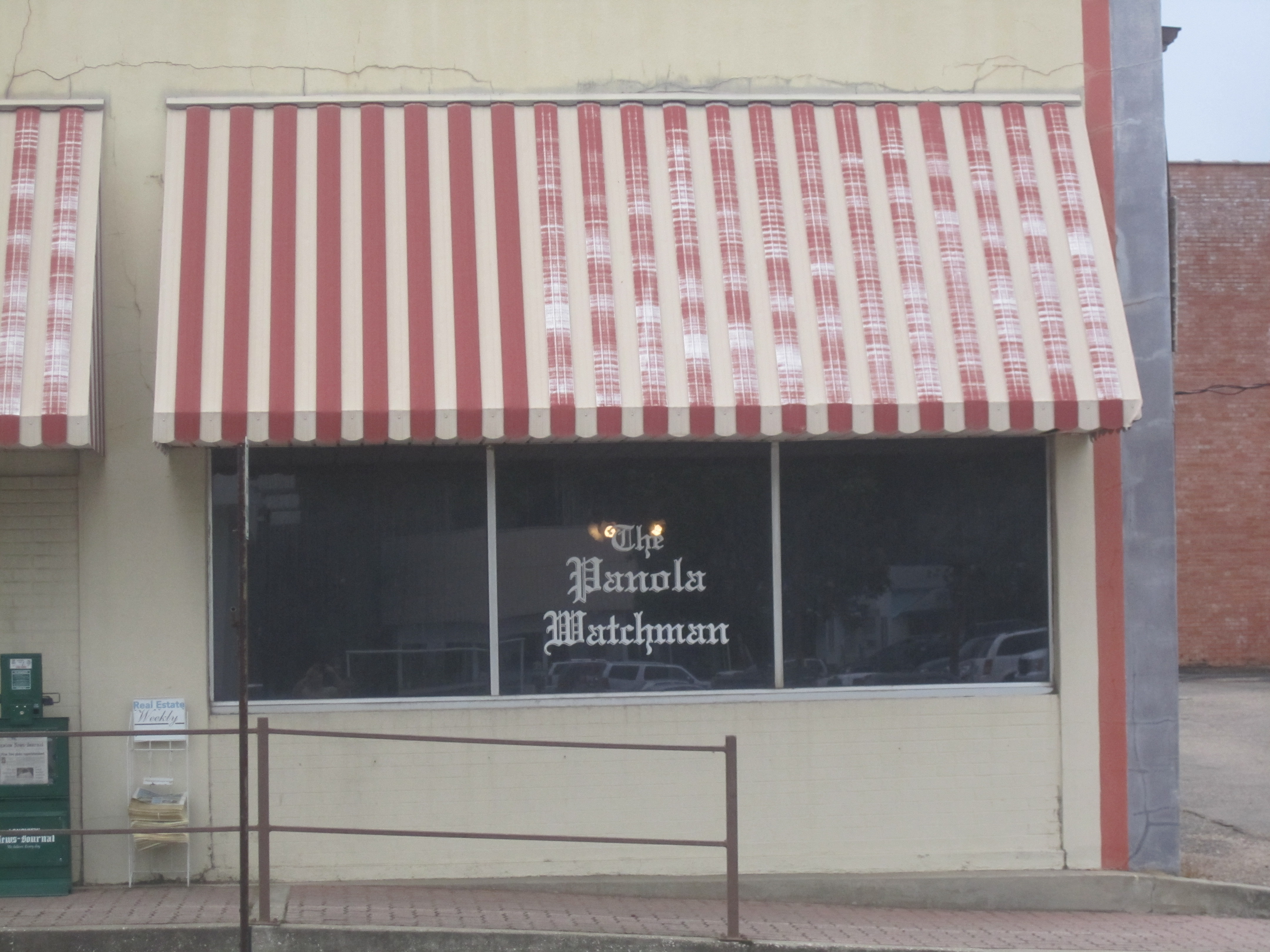
The Panola Watchman newspaper was first published in 1873 in Carthage by Tom M. Bowers (1837-1916), a Confederate veteran who earlier printed the Carthage Banner.

Jonathon Anderson, a migrant from the United States and founder of Panola County, donated nearly 100 acres of land in the 1800s to get the county started. Panola County was formed in 1846 from sections of Harrison and Shelby counties. Developed for cotton plantations, it was named after a Choctaw/Chickasaw word for cotton. In the antebellum years, planters used enslaved African Americans as workers on their large plantations. After the Civil War, freedmen worked largely as tenant farmers and sharecroppers in this area.

== Geography ==
According to the U.S. Census Bureau, the county has a total area of 821 square miles (2,130 km^{2}), of which 802 square miles (2,080 km^{2}) are land and 20 square miles (52 km^{2}) (2.4%) are covered by water.

=== Major highways ===
- U.S. Highway 59
  - Interstate 369 is currently under construction and will follow the current route of U.S. 59 in most places.
- U.S. Highway 79
- State Highway 43
- State Highway 149
- State Highway 315
- Spur 152
- Spur 572
- Farm to Market Road 10
- Farm to Market Road 31
- Farm to Market Road 124
- Farm to Market Road 1970

The TTC-69 component (recommended preferred) of the once-planned Trans-Texas Corridor went through Panola County.

=== Adjacent counties and parishes ===
- Harrison County (north)
- Caddo Parish, Louisiana (northeast)
- De Soto Parish, Louisiana (east)
- Shelby County (south)
- Rusk County (west)

== Communities ==
=== Cities ===
- Beckville
- Carthage (county seat)
- Tatum (mostly in Rusk County)

=== Town ===
- Gary City

=== Unincorporated communities ===
- Grand Bluff
- Bethany (partly in Caddo Parish, LA)
- Clayton
- Corinth
- Daniels
- Deadwood
- DeBerry
- Galloway
- Long Branch
- Midyett
- Murvaul
- Panola
- Riderville
- Old Center

=== Ghost towns ===
- Center Point
- Freeman, Texas
- Grand Bluff
- Mineral Springs
- Pulaski

== Demographics ==
Historical population
Census	Pop.	Note	%±
1850	3,871		—
1860	8,475		118.9%
1870	10,119		19.4%
1880	12,219		20.8%
1890	14,328		17.3%
1900	21,404		49.4%
1910	20,424		−4.6%
1920	21,755		6.5%
1930	24,063		10.6%
1940	22,513		−6.4%
1950	19,250		−14.5%
1960	16,870		−12.4%
1970	15,894		−5.8%
1980	20,724		30.4%
1990	22,035		6.3%
2000	22,756		3.3%
2010	23,796		4.6%
2020	22,491		−5.5%
2025 (est.)	23,018	▲	2.3%
U.S. Decennial Census; 1850–2010 2010–2020

=== Racial and ethnic composition ===
Panola County, Texas – Racial and ethnic composition Note: the US Census treats Hispanic/Latino as an ethnic category. This table excludes Latinos from the racial categories and assigns them to a separate category. Hispanics/Latinos may be of any race.
Race / Ethnicity (NH = Non-Hispanic)	Pop 1980	Pop 1990	Pop 2000	Pop 2010	Pop 2020	% 1980	% 1990	% 2000	% 2010	% 2020
White alone (NH)	16,273	17,429	17,629	17,521	16,098	78.52%	79.10%	77.47%	73.63%	71.58%
Black or African American alone (NH)	4,044	4,042	4,013	3,850	3,244	19.51%	18.34%	17.63%	16.18%	14.42%
Native American or Alaska Native alone (NH)	22	57	74	84	96	0.11%	0.26%	0.33%	0.35%	0.43%
Asian alone (NH)	19	23	53	72	99	0.09%	0.10%	0.23%	0.30%	0.44%
Native Hawaiian or Pacific Islander alone (NH)	x	x	1	3	7	x	x	0.00%	0.01%	0.03%
Other race alone (NH)	23	7	9	24	26	0.11%	0.03%	0.04%	0.10%	0.12%
Mixed race or Multiracial (NH)	x	x	179	272	731	x	x	0.79%	1.14%	3.25%
Hispanic or Latino (any race)	343	477	798	1,970	2,190	1.66%	2.16%	3.51%	8.28%	9.74%
Total	20,724	22,035	22,756	23,796	22,491	100.00%	100.00%	100.00%	100.00%	100.00%

=== 2020 census ===
As of the 2020 census, the county had a population of 22,491. The median age was 41.9 years, with 23.6% of residents under the age of 18 and 20.8% aged 65 years or older. For every 100 females there were 96.9 males, and for every 100 females age 18 and over there were 94.3 males age 18 and over.

The racial makeup of the county was 74.0% White, 14.5% Black or African American, 0.8% American Indian and Alaska Native, 0.5% Asian, <0.1% Native Hawaiian and Pacific Islander, 3.9% from some other race, and 6.4% from two or more races. Hispanic or Latino residents of any race comprised 9.7% of the population.

28.1% of residents lived in urban areas, while 71.9% lived in rural areas.

There were 8,921 households in the county, of which 30.9% had children under the age of 18 living in them. Of all households, 50.7% were married-couple households, 18.4% were households with a male householder and no spouse or partner present, and 26.7% were households with a female householder and no spouse or partner present. About 28.6% of all households were made up of individuals and 14.5% had someone living alone who was 65 years of age or older.

There were 10,733 housing units, of which 16.9% were vacant. Among occupied housing units, 79.1% were owner-occupied and 20.9% were renter-occupied. The homeowner vacancy rate was 1.7% and the rental vacancy rate was 12.4%.

=== 2000 census ===
As of the 2000 census, 22,756 people, 8,821 households, and 6,395 families resided in the county. The population density was 28 people per square mile (11 people/km^{2}). The 10,524 housing units averaged 13 units per square mile (5.0/km^{2}). The racial makeup of the county was 78.78% White, 17.67% Black or African American, 0.36% Native American, 0.24% Asian, 1.87% from other races, and 1.07% from two or more races. About 3.5% of the population were Hispanic or Latino of any race.

Of the 8,821 households, 32.00% had children under the age of 18 living with them, 57.90% were married couples living together, 11.30% had a female householder with no husband present, and 27.50% were not families; 25.10% of all households were made up of individuals, and 12.80% had someone living alone who was 65 years of age or older. The average household size was 2.53 and the average family size was 3.02.

In the county, the population was distributed as 25.20% under the age of 18, 9.20% from 18 to 24, 25.10% from 25 to 44, 24.60% from 45 to 64, and 15.80% who were 65 years of age or older. The median age was 39 years. For every 100 females, there were 92.30 males. For every 100 females age 18 and over, there were 87.10 males.

The median income for a household in the county was $31,909, and for a family was $37,595. Males had a median income of $31,333 versus $19,017 for females. The per capita income for the county was $15,439. About 11.60% of families and 14.10% of the population were below the poverty line, including 16.50% of those under age 18 and 16.10% of those age 65 or over.

== Education ==
These school districts serve Panola County:

- Beckville ISD
- Carthage ISD
- Elysian Fields ISD (mostly in Harrison County)
- Gary ISD
- Joaquin ISD (mostly in Shelby County)
- Tatum ISD (mostly in Rusk County)
- Tenaha ISD (mostly in Shelby County)

Panola College, a junior college, has operated in Carthage since 1947.

All of Panola County is in the service area of Panola College.

== Notable residents ==
- Tex Ritter, country music singer, born in Murvaul
- Jim Reeves, country music singer, born in Galloway

== Points of Interest ==
- Texas Country Music Hall of Fame and Tex Ritter Museum is located in Carthage.

== Politics ==
United States presidential election results for Panola County, Texas
Year	Republican		Democratic		Third party(ies)	
Year	No.	%	No.	%	No.	%
1912	82	5.37%	1,203	78.78%	242	15.85%
1916	125	8.77%	1,228	86.12%	73	5.12%
1920	268	16.15%	1,086	65.46%	305	18.38%
1924	119	5.33%	2,088	93.51%	26	1.16%
1928	420	24.21%	1,312	75.62%	3	0.17%
1932	50	1.85%	2,630	97.08%	29	1.07%
1936	95	3.74%	2,425	95.36%	23	0.90%
1940	179	5.87%	2,871	94.07%	2	0.07%
1944	221	8.83%	2,106	84.17%	175	6.99%
1948	256	9.08%	1,751	62.14%	811	28.78%
1952	2,080	41.75%	2,897	58.15%	5	0.10%
1956	2,538	52.48%	2,225	46.01%	73	1.51%
1960	2,264	50.11%	2,187	48.41%	67	1.48%
1964	2,818	51.83%	2,608	47.97%	11	0.20%
1968	1,586	26.67%	1,711	28.77%	2,650	44.56%
1972	4,324	73.74%	1,511	25.77%	29	0.49%
1976	3,218	46.12%	3,731	53.48%	28	0.40%
1980	4,022	51.92%	3,637	46.95%	88	1.14%
1984	5,676	63.88%	3,179	35.78%	30	0.34%
1988	4,642	52.87%	4,123	46.96%	15	0.17%
1992	3,473	37.22%	3,950	42.33%	1,909	20.46%
1996	4,008	44.59%	4,168	46.37%	812	9.03%
2000	5,975	65.85%	3,011	33.18%	88	0.97%
2004	7,021	70.16%	2,958	29.56%	28	0.28%
2008	7,582	74.22%	2,586	25.31%	48	0.47%
2012	7,950	77.71%	2,211	21.61%	69	0.67%
2016	8,445	81.08%	1,835	17.62%	136	1.31%
2020	9,326	81.39%	2,057	17.95%	75	0.65%
2024	9,500	83.05%	1,905	16.65%	34	0.30%

United States Senate election results for Panola County, Texas1
Year	Republican		Democratic		Third party(ies)	
Year	No.	%	No.	%	No.	%
2024	9,281	81.69%	1,935	17.03%	145	1.28%

United States Senate election results for Panola County, Texas2
Year	Republican		Democratic		Third party(ies)	
Year	No.	%	No.	%	No.	%
2020	9,145	80.91%	2,015	17.83%	143	1.27%

Texas Gubernatorial election results for Panola County
Year	Republican		Democratic		Third party(ies)	
Year	No.	%	No.	%	No.	%
2022	7,039	84.67%	1,213	14.59%	61	0.73%

== See also ==
- National Register of Historic Places listings in Panola County, Texas
- Recorded Texas Historic Landmarks in Panola County
