= Carthage, Texas =

City in and county seat of Panola County, Texas, United States

- City
- City of Carthage
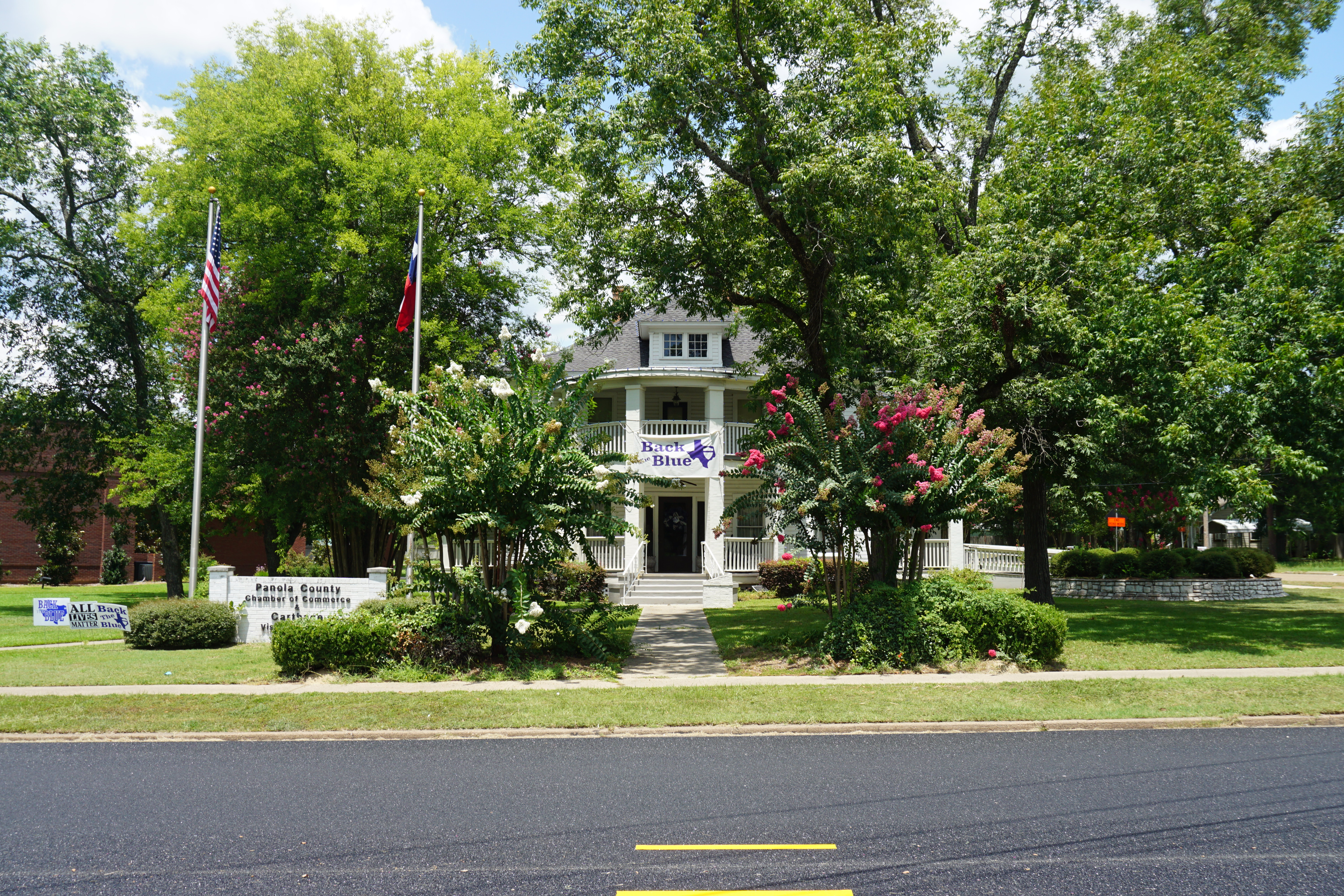
- The historic Hawthorn-Clabaugh-Patterson House is now used for offices of the Carthage Chamber of Commerce.
- Motto: "Country at its best!"
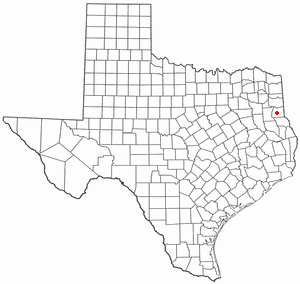
- Location of Carthage, Texas

- Coordinates: 32°09′09″N 94°20′13″W
- Country: United States
- State: Texas
- County: Panola

Area
  - Total: 10.68 sq mi (27.67 km^{2})
  - Land: 10.66 sq mi (27.61 km^{2})
  - Water: 0.023 sq mi (0.06 km^{2})
- Elevation: 299 ft (91 m)

Population (2020)
  - Total: 6,569
  - Density: 603.3/sq mi (232.92/km^{2})
- Time zone: UTC-6 (Central (CST))
  - Summer (DST): UTC-5 (CDT)
- ZIP code: 75633
- Area codes: 903, 430
- FIPS code: 48-13108
- GNIS feature ID: 2409400
- Website: www.carthagetexas.com

Carthage is a city in and the county seat of Panola County, Texas, United States. The city is situated in deep East Texas, 20 miles (32 km) west of the Louisiana state line. Its population was 6,569 at the 2020 census.

== History ==
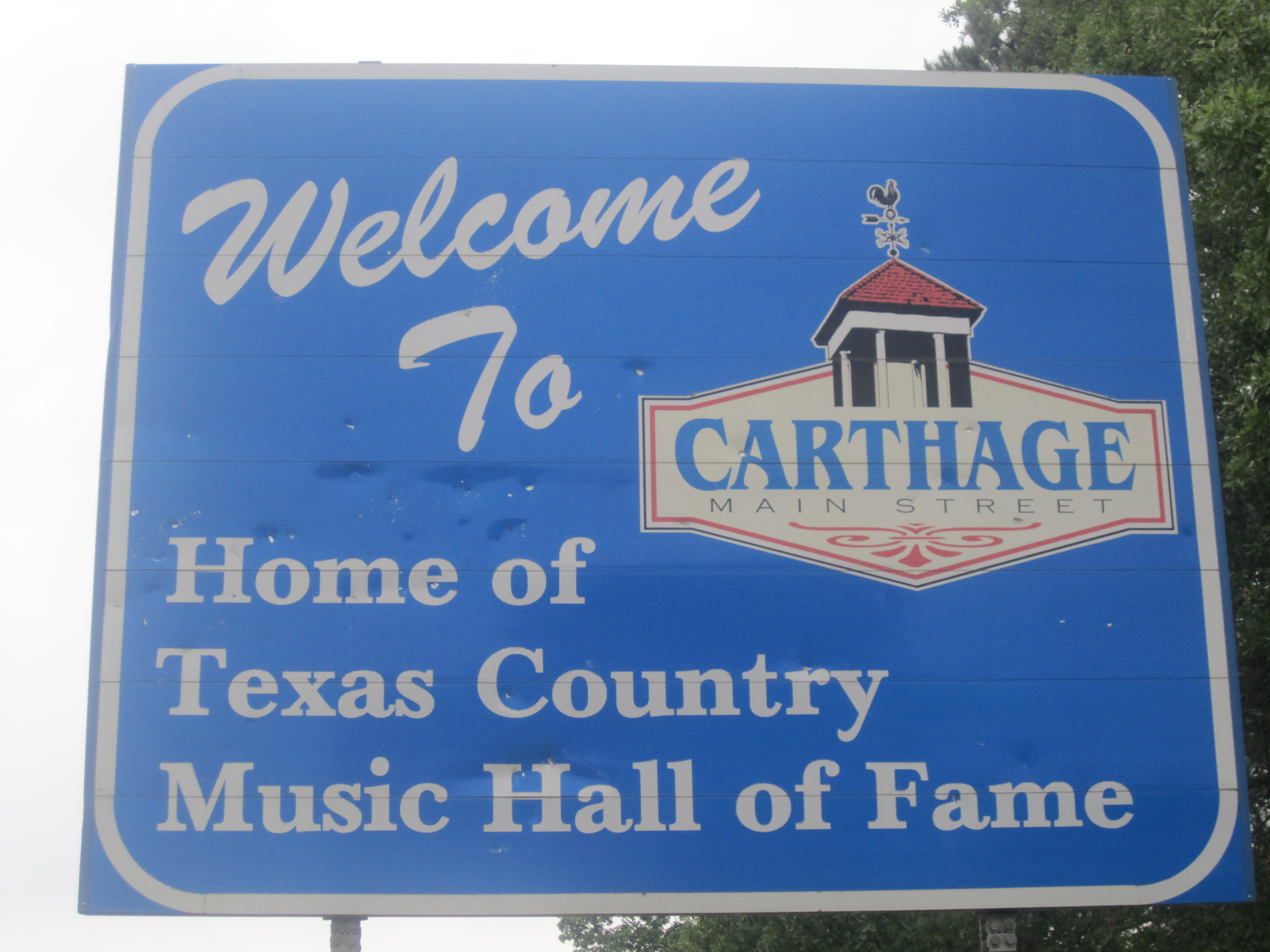
Carthage welcome sign

Carthage was founded in 1847, two years after Texas was admitted to the United States. During the Civil War, men from Carthage and Panola County served as Confederate soldiers. African-American resident Milton M. Holland, formerly enslaved, served as a Union sergeant and earned a Medal of Honor.

Carthage was established in 1834 and became the county seat. The Harrises were early settlers and named the town after their former home of Carthage, Tennessee. When Carthage established in 1848, it was named after Carthage, Mississippi.

After the Civil War, population growth was slow, but large amounts of cotton, corn, sweet potatoes, oats, and sugarcane were produced in the county. The city began to expand in 1888 when a railroad reached Carthage, along with telegraph and telephone lines.

During the Great Depression, a gas field was discovered near Carthage. After World War II, this gas field was developed and proved to be the largest in the United States. The city flourished, with the population increasing from about 1,300 to 5,000. During this period, a courthouse and a high school were built. In 1947, Panola County Junior College was established in Carthage and founded KGAS-AM 1590, which began broadcasting in 1955.

As a result of 19.6% population growth between 1970 and 1980, documented by U.S. Decennial Census; Panola General Hospital was established in 1997. Today, the now-named ETMC Carthage operates a 24-hour emergency department, designated a Level IV trauma center by the state of Texas.

On August 22, 1998, the Tex Ritter Museum in Carthage was the site for the grand opening of the Texas Country Music Hall of Fame, honoring those who have made outstanding contributions to country music and born in the state of Texas.

On September 16, 1998, KGAS-FM began broadcasting a country music format in Carthage; it was featured in Bernie, the 2011 American biographical black comedy crime film directed by Richard Linklater.

=== 1996 murder of Marjorie Nugent ===
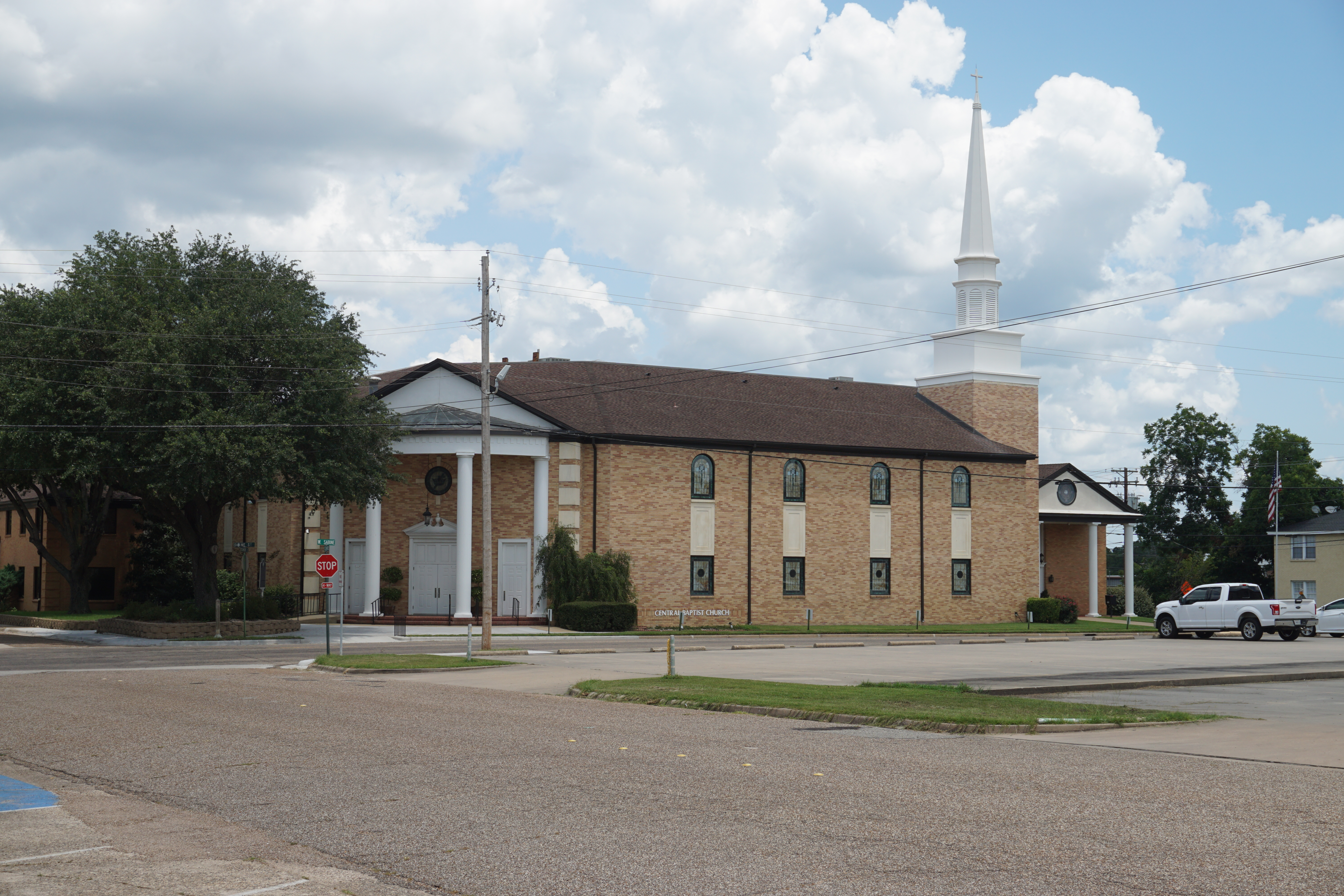
Central Baptist Church in downtown Carthage

After losing her husband, widow Marjorie Nugent, an 81-year-old resident of Carthage, became friends with Bernie Tiede, the assistant funeral director in town. In late 1996, townspeople did not see her, but thought perhaps she had moved to join her out-of-town family. When the family could not reach her, they filed a missing-person's report. Nine months after her death, her friend and companion, 39-year-old Bernie Tiede, was brought in for questioning by police and confessed to killing her. He claimed she had emotionally abused him.

He shot her four times in the back with a .22 rifle in November 1996. A mortician, he cleaned her body and placed it in a freezer in her house, where it was not discovered until 1997. Tiede continued his community activities for several months after her death. He was convicted of first-degree murder and sentenced to life in prison. After a habeas corpus challenge, he was paroled on a $10,000 bond in 2014, but in 2016, Tiede had a resentencing hearing and was sentenced to 99 years to life.

Panola County District Attorney Danny Buck Davidson said initially that few in the community questioned no longer seeing the elderly woman. He said, "That's what you do when you're a con guy and you move in. He had her cut all ties, so ultimately the only person she had to rely on was him. Mrs. Nugent was a human being. She didn't deserve her fate at the hands of Bernie." Tiede apparently killed the wealthy woman to get control of her money, spending an estimated $3 million of Nugent's $10 million. Davidson said Tiede used some of it for philanthropy: "He sent people to college. He donated to musicals, plays and bought instruments at the college. That was all done with Mrs. Nugent's money. After she was in the freezer, he really jumped out there as a benefactor."

== Free speech lawsuit ==
On September 20, 2024, Jeff Gray was issued with a criminal trespass notice and removed from City Hall for holding a sign that said "God Bless the Homeless Vets" and for vocalizing this message to those passing by him. On April 13, 2026, Gray, through counsel, sent a demand letter to the city, offering to settle his federal civil-rights claim. On May 28, 2026, the city settled the lawsuit for $17,910.

== Geography ==
According to the United States Census Bureau, Carthage has a total area of 10.5 square miles (27 km^{2}), of which 10.5 square miles (27 km^{2}) are land and 0.04 sq mi (0.10 km^{2}) (0.4%) is covered by water.

The climate in this area is characterized by hot, humid summers and generally mild to cool winters. According to the Köppen climate classification, Carthage has a humid subtropical climate, Cfa on climate maps.

Climate data for Carthage, Texas (1991–2020 normals, extremes 1951–present)
Month	Jan	Feb	Mar	Apr	May	Jun	Jul	Aug	Sep	Oct	Nov	Dec	Year
Record high °F (°C)	84 (29)	90 (32)	92 (33)	93 (34)	98 (37)	103 (39)	106 (41)	108 (42)	109 (43)	95 (35)	88 (31)	85 (29)	109 (43)
Mean daily maximum °F (°C)	56.8 (13.8)	61.4 (16.3)	68.8 (20.4)	76.0 (24.4)	82.8 (28.2)	89.3 (31.8)	92.4 (33.6)	93.1 (33.9)	87.4 (30.8)	78.0 (25.6)	66.6 (19.2)	58.9 (14.9)	76.0 (24.4)
Daily mean °F (°C)	46.5 (8.1)	50.4 (10.2)	57.5 (14.2)	64.7 (18.2)	72.8 (22.7)	79.8 (26.6)	82.8 (28.2)	82.8 (28.2)	76.7 (24.8)	66.3 (19.1)	55.6 (13.1)	48.5 (9.2)	65.4 (18.6)
Mean daily minimum °F (°C)	36.1 (2.3)	39.5 (4.2)	46.3 (7.9)	53.5 (11.9)	62.8 (17.1)	70.3 (21.3)	73.2 (22.9)	72.5 (22.5)	66.0 (18.9)	54.5 (12.5)	44.5 (6.9)	38.2 (3.4)	54.8 (12.7)
Record low °F (°C)	5 (−15)	4 (−16)	18 (−8)	28 (−2)	39 (4)	45 (7)	55 (13)	50 (10)	38 (3)	26 (−3)	12 (−11)	1 (−17)	1 (−17)
Average precipitation inches (mm)	4.66 (118)	4.23 (107)	4.92 (125)	4.72 (120)	4.35 (110)	4.04 (103)	3.64 (92)	3.44 (87)	3.67 (93)	4.54 (115)	4.44 (113)	5.63 (143)	52.28 (1,328)
Average snowfall inches (cm)	0.3 (0.76)	0.4 (1.0)	0.1 (0.25)	0.0 (0.0)	0.0 (0.0)	0.0 (0.0)	0.0 (0.0)	0.0 (0.0)	0.0 (0.0)	0.0 (0.0)	0.0 (0.0)	0.0 (0.0)	0.8 (2.0)
Average precipitation days (≥ 0.01 in)	8.5	8.3	8.3	6.3	7.4	7.5	5.4	5.7	5.8	6.0	7.3	8.9	85.4
Average snowy days (≥ 0.1 in)	0.2	0.1	0.1	0.0	0.0	0.0	0.0	0.0	0.0	0.0	0.0	0.0	0.4
Source: NOAA

== Demographics ==
Historical population
Census	Pop.	Note	%±
1880	290		—
1890	554		91.0%
1920	1,366		—
1930	1,651		20.9%
1940	2,178		31.9%
1950	4,750		118.1%
1960	5,262		10.8%
1970	5,392		2.5%
1980	6,447		19.6%
1990	6,496		0.8%
2000	6,664		2.6%
2010	6,779		1.7%
2020	6,569		−3.1%
U.S. Decennial Census

=== 2020 census ===
As of the 2020 census, Carthage had a population of 6,569 residents and 1,739 families. The median age was 39.2 years; 23.4% of residents were under 18 and 20.1% were 65 age or older. For every 100 females, there were 87.3 males, and for every 100 females 18 and over, there were 81.6 males 18 and over.

About 95.3% of residents lived in urban areas, while 4.7% lived in rural areas.

Of the 2,612 households in Carthage, 32.5% had children under 18 living in them, 41.4% were married-couple households, 17.3% had a male householder with no spouse or partner present, and 36.5% had a female householder with no spouse or partner present. About 33.0% of all households were made up of individuals, and 16.9% had someone living alone who was 65 or older.

The city had 2,957 housing units, of which 11.7% were vacant. Among occupied housing units, 65.2% were owner-occupied and 34.8% were renter-occupied. The homeowner vacancy rate was 2.3% and the rental vacancy rate was 13.2%.

Racial composition as of the 2020 census
Race	Percentage
White	64.3%
Black or African American	19.5%
American Indian and Alaska Native	1.0%
Asian	0.9%
Native Hawaiian and other Pacific Islander	0.1%
Some other race	5.7%
Two or more races	8.6%
Hispanic or Latino (of any race)	15.4%

=== 2010 census ===
As of the census of 2010, 6,779 people, 2,628 households, and 1,745 families resided in the city. The population density was 645.6 people per mi^{2} (249.2/km^{2}). The 2,909 housing units averaged 277.0 per mi^{2} (106.9/km^{2}). The racial makeup of the city was 69.5% White, 21.1% African American, 0.5% Native American, 0.7% Asian, 6.5% from other races, and 1.7% from two or more races. Hispanics or Latinos of any race were 11.0% of the population.

Of the 2,628 households, 29.8% had children under 18 living with them, 45.6% were married couples living together, 16.4% had a female householder with no husband present, and 33.6% were not families. About 30.5% of all households were made up of individuals, and 14.8% had someone living alone who was 65 or older. The average household size was 2.45, and the average family size was 3.04.

In the city, the age distribution was 24.6% under 18, 11.2% from 18 to 24, 23.9% from 25 to 44, 24.1% from 45 to 64, and 16.3% who were 65 or older. The median age was 35.9 years. For every 100 females, there were 88.3 males. For every 100 females age 18 and over, there were 83.8 males.

=== 2000 census ===
As of the 2000 Census, the median income in the city for a household was $31,822 and for a family was $37,031. Males had a median income of $33,080 versus $21,473 for females. The per capita income for the city was $16,332. About 11.8% of families and 13.2% of the population were below the poverty line, including 15.2% of those under 18 and 12.9% of those 65 or over.

== Culture and arts ==
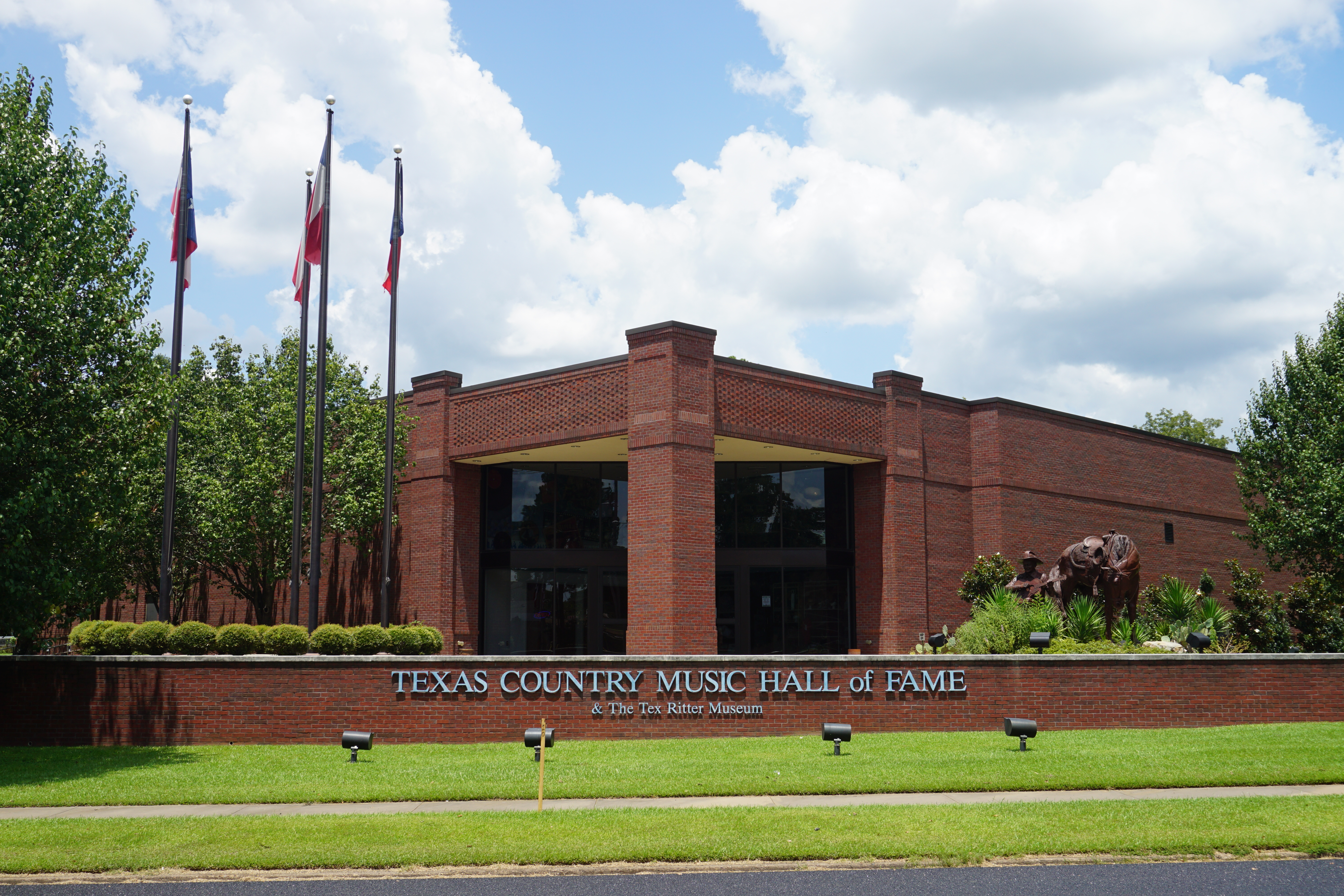
Texas Country Music Hall of Fame

The Texas Country Music Hall of Fame is located in Carthage, which also houses the Tex Ritter Museum. The Jim Reeves Memorial is located on the outskirts of Carthage, east on U.S. 79. Reeves and Ritter were from the nearby unincorporated communities of Galloway and Murvaul, respectively.

== Education ==
The City of Carthage is entirely within the Carthage Independent School District.

The c two-year community Panola College is located adjacent to the Carthage City Hall. All of Panola County is in the service area of Panola College.

== Media ==
Carthage is served by two local radio stations: KGAS 1590 AM and KGAS 104.3 FM, and by a local newspaper, The Panola Watchman. The nearest media market of notable size is in nearby Shreveport, Louisiana.

== Transportation ==
=== Roads ===
==== U.S. highways ====
- US 59 (Southeast and Northeast Loop), runs north to south through Carthage. To the north, US Highway 59 goes through Marshall. To the south, US Highway 59 goes through Tenaha.
- US 79, runs east to west through Carthage. To the east, US Highway 79 goes through DeBerry and to the west the highway goes through Henderson.

==== State highways ====
- SH 149, runs around the west side of Carthage. To the north, Texas State Highway 149 runs through Beckville and to Longview.
- SH 315, runs northeast to southwest through Carthage. To the southwest, Texas State Highway 315 runs Clayton to Mount Enterprise.
- Loop 436, runs around the west side of Carthage and goes parallel to part of State Highway 149. Goes from US 59 just north of Carthage to US 59 just south of Carthage.

==== Farm-to-market roads ====
- FM 699, runs south/north through Carthage. To the south, Farm-to-Market (FM) 699 goes through Old Center.
- FM 10, runs south to north to Carthage. To the south, FM 10 goes through Gary City.

== Notable people ==
- John Booty is an American former football defensive back in the National Football League.
- Jacke Davis was an American professional baseball outfielder.
- Milton M. Holland was born the son of a slave owner, but became the first native Texan to be awarded the Medal of Honor.
- Philip Humber is an American former professional baseball player.
- Mildred Fay Jefferson was the first American black woman to graduate from Harvard Medical School.
- Derek Wayne Johnson is an American film director and third-level black belt in the art of American karate.
- Margie Neal was a newspaper publisher and first American woman elected to Texas State Senate in 1926.
- Jim Reeves was an American country and popular music singer-songwriter known as "Gentleman Jim".
- Brandon Rhyder is an American Texas Country/Red Dirt singer.
- Tex Ritter was an American actor from the mid 1930s into the 1960s and a pioneer of American country music.
- Jack Boynton Strong was an American politician and lawyer who served in the Texas Senate between 1963 and 1971.
- Bernie Tiede is formerly a mortician convicted of murdering widow Marjorie Nugent.
- Keaontay Ingram is a former NFL running back.
- Ja'Marcus Ingram is an NFL defensive back for the Buffalo Bills.
- Moochie Dixon is an NFL wide receiver for the New Orleans Saints

== Image gallery ==
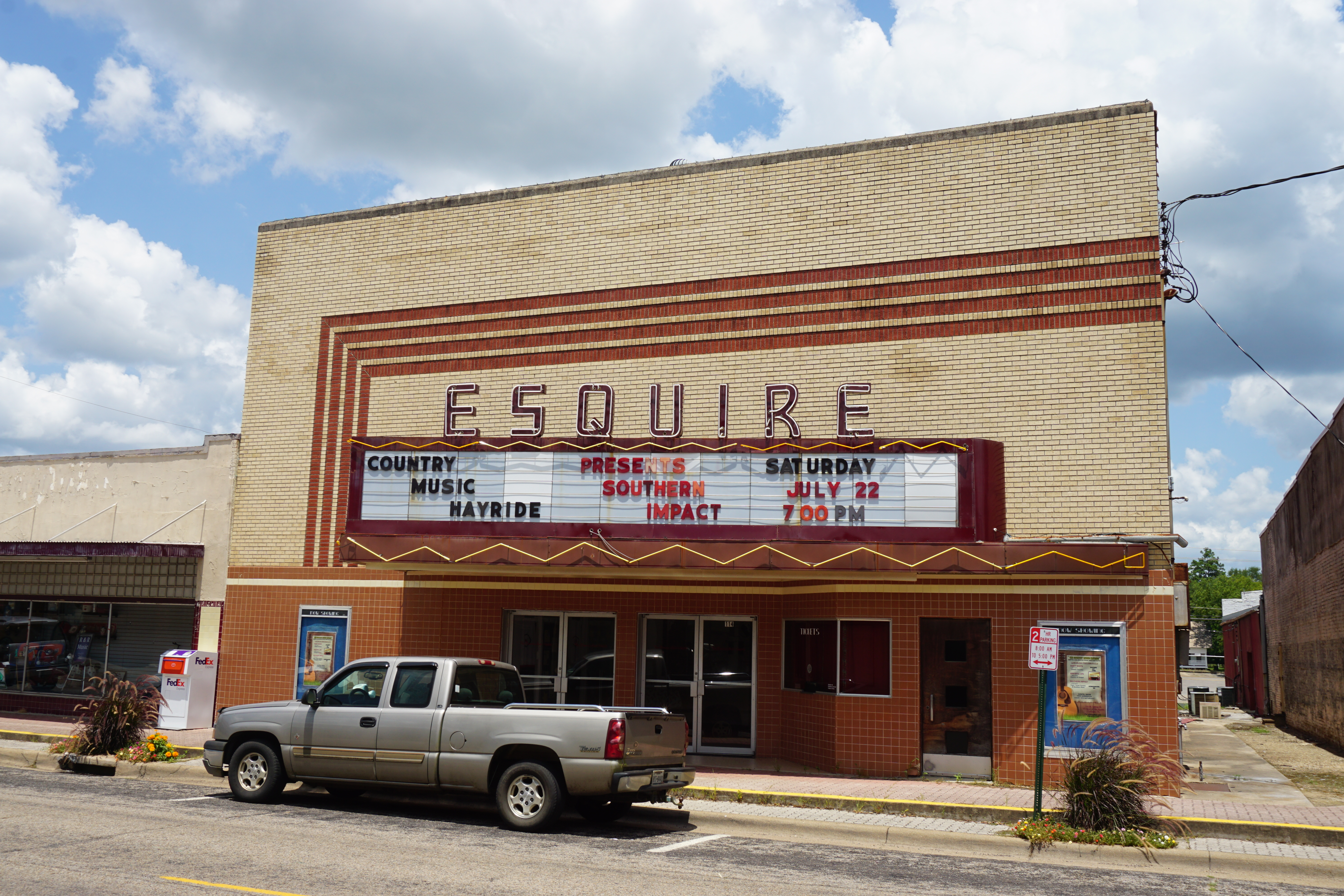
The Esquire Theater in Carthage hosts country music on Saturday evenings.

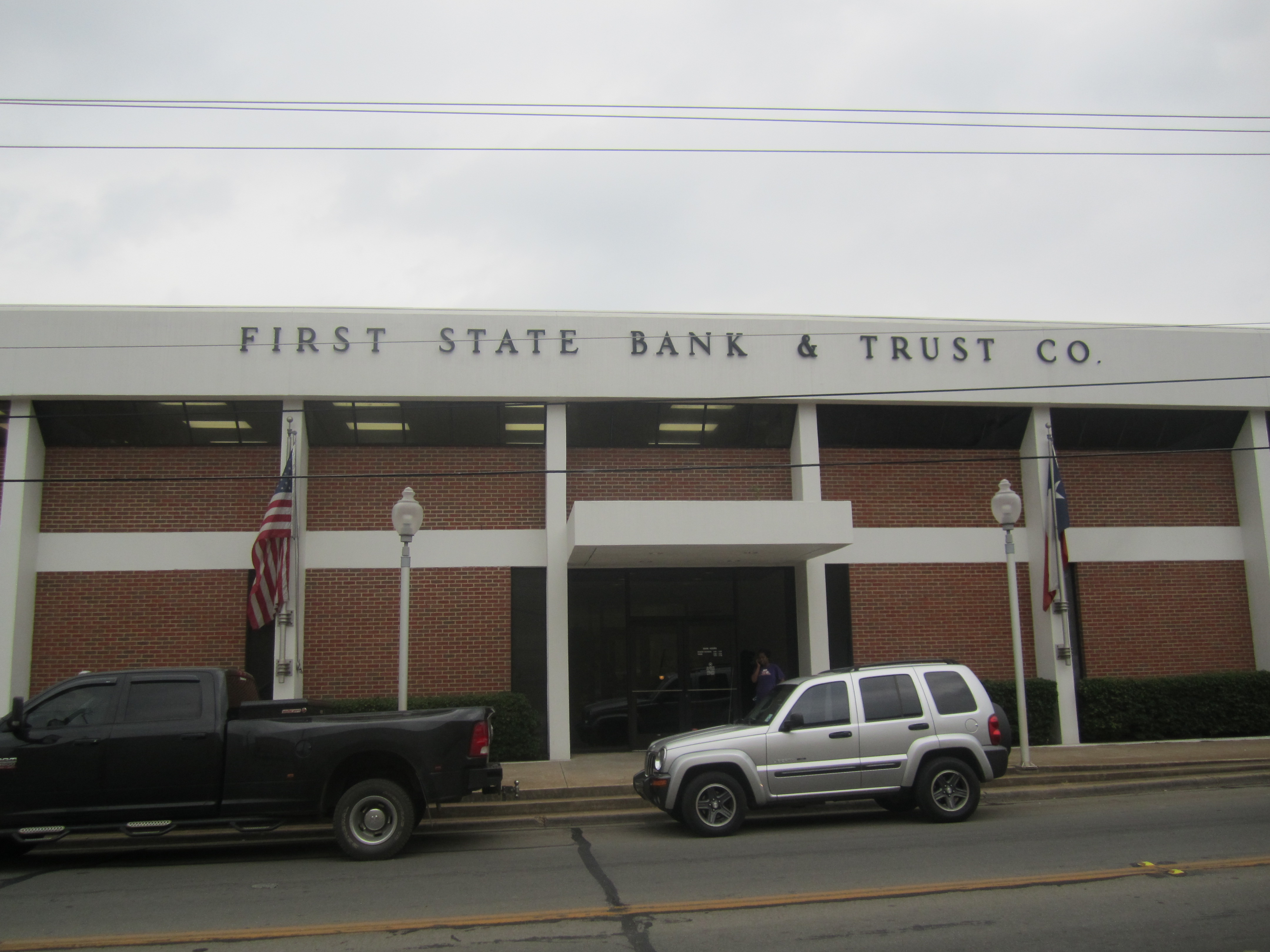
First State Bank and Trust Company in downtown Carthage

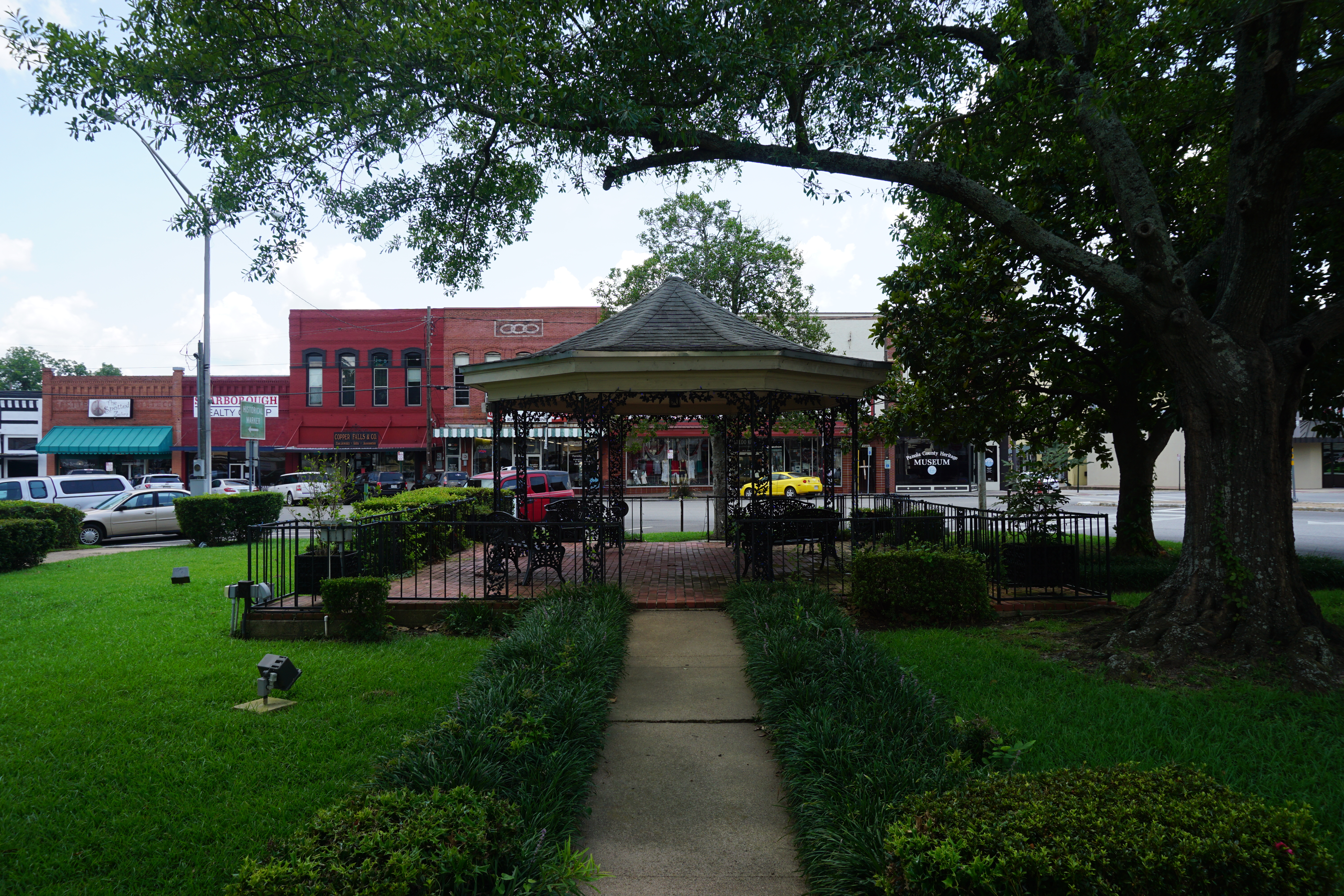
Anderson Park is located in the center of downtown Carthage.

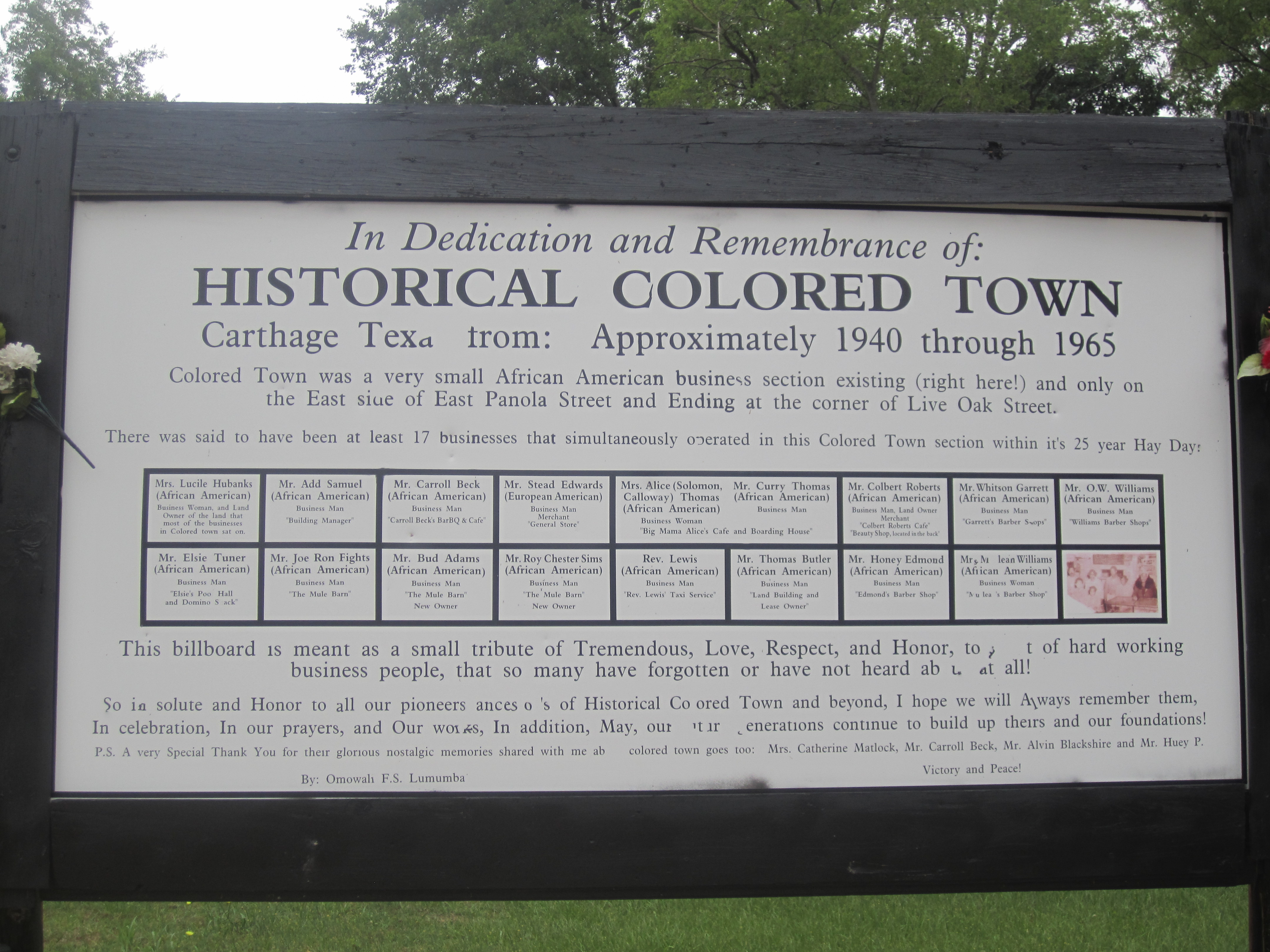
Historical marker commemorating Colored Town, a black business section that had its prime from 1940 to 1965, from East Panola to Live Oak Streets.

== See also ==
- List of municipalities in Texas
