= U.S. Route 59 in Texas =

Section of U.S. Numbered Highway in Texas, United States

U.S. Highway 59
- US 59 highlighted in red

Route information
- Maintained by TxDOT
- Length: 622.736 mi (1,002.196 km)
- Existed: 1935–present

Major junctions
- West end: I-69W / Loop 20 / Fed. 85D at the Mexican border in Laredo
- I-35 / US 83 in Laredo; Future I-69C / US 281 in George West; I-37 near George West; Future I-69 / Future I-69E / Future I-69W / US 77 / US 87 in Victoria; US 90 Alt. in Sugar Land; I-45 in Houston; I-10 in Houston; Future I-69 / Future I-369 / US 84 / US 96 in Tenaha; I-20 / US 80 in Marshall; I-30 / I-369 / US 67 / US 71 in Texarkana
- North end: US 59 / US 71 in Texarkana, AR

Location
- Country: United States
- State: Texas
- Counties: Webb, Duval, McMullen, Live Oak, Bee, Goliad, Victoria, Jackson, Wharton, Fort Bend, Harris, Montgomery, Liberty, San Jacinto, Polk, Angelina, Nacogdoches, Rusk, Shelby, Panola, Harrison, Marion, Cass, Bowie

Highway system
- United States Numbered Highway System; List; Special; Divided; Highways in Texas; Interstate; US; State; Former; Toll; Loops; Spurs; FM/RM; Park; Rec
← SH 58	→ SH 59

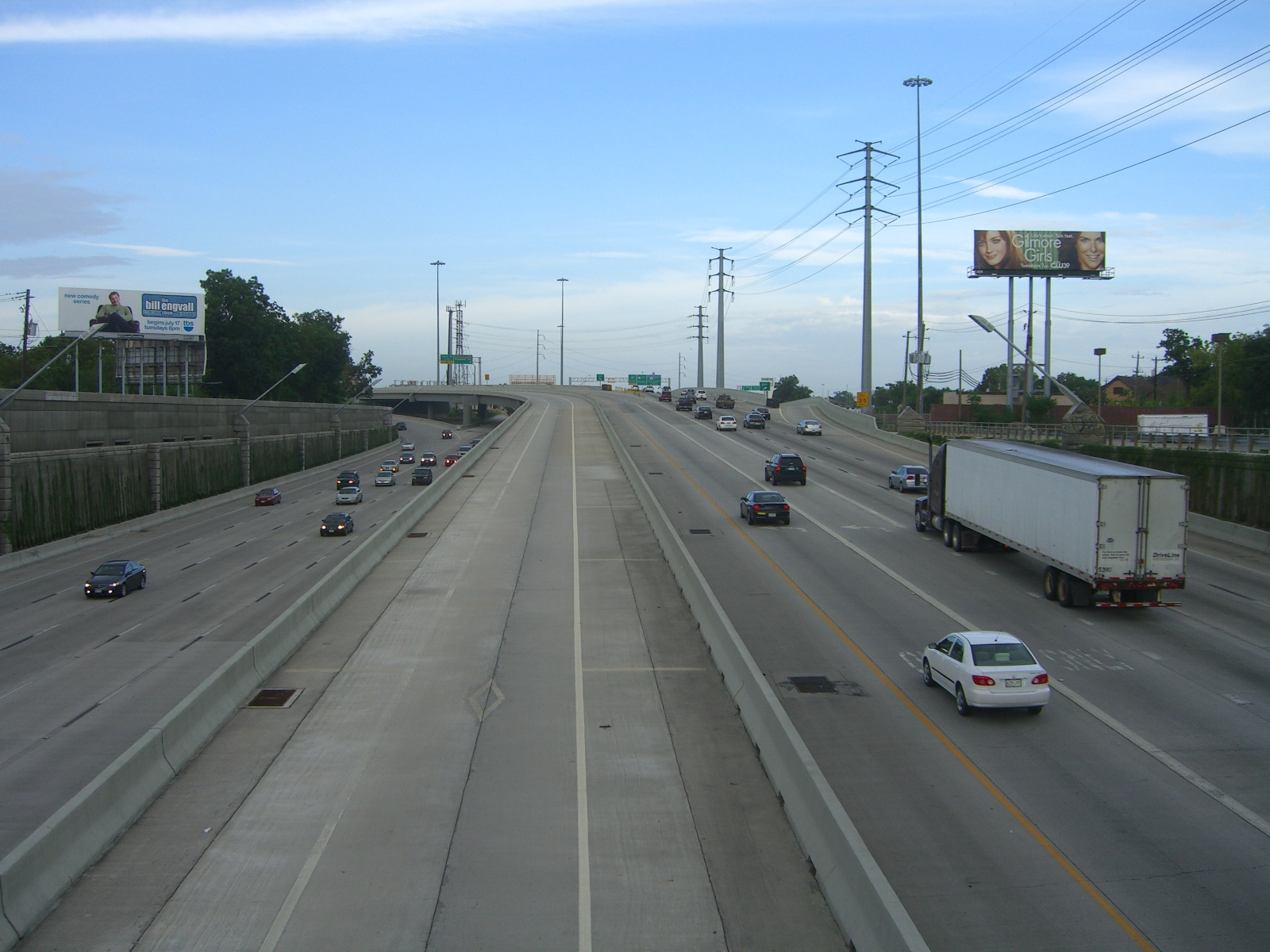
US 59, co-signed with I-69, in Houston looking east

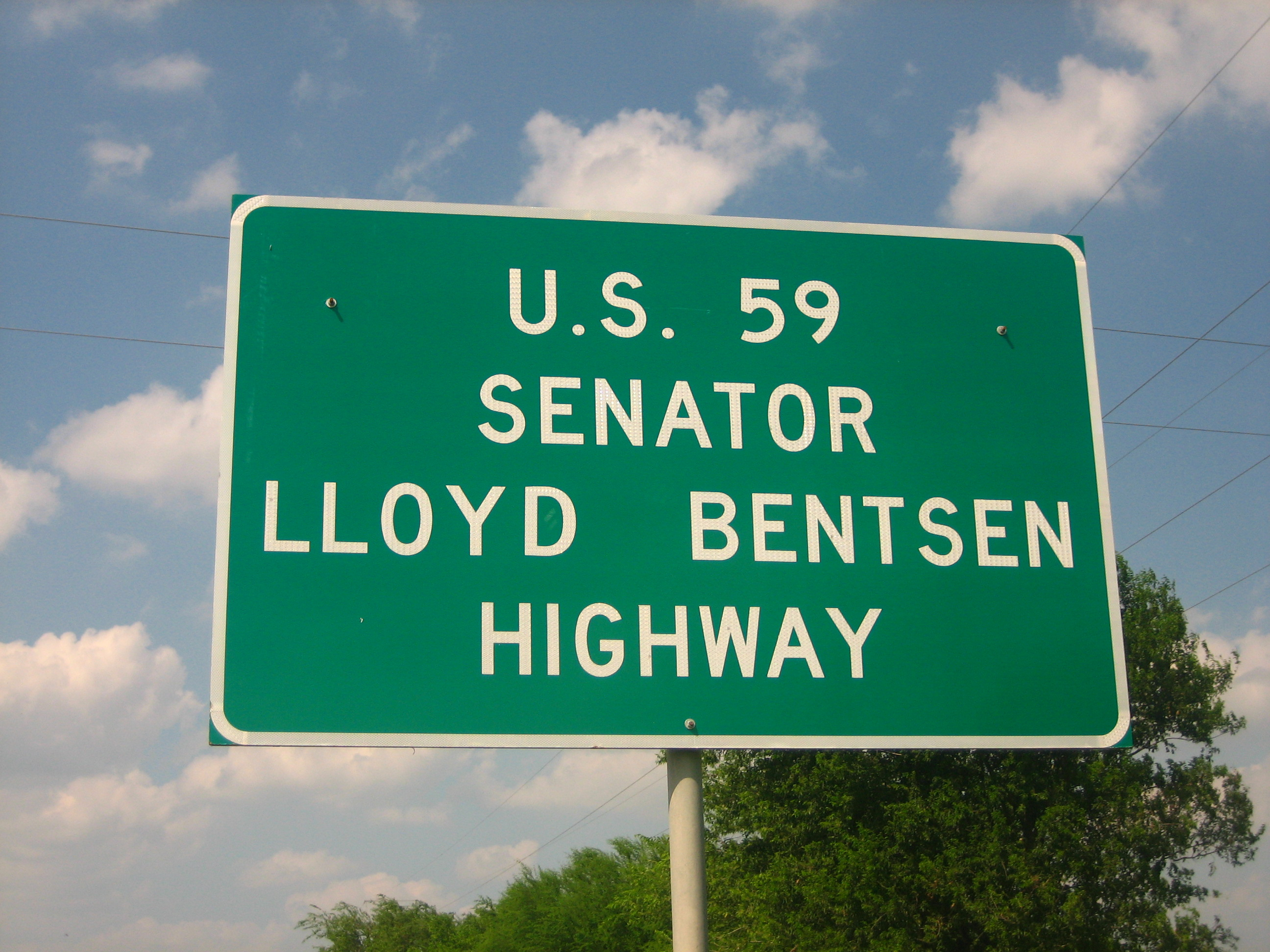
US 59, connects Texarkana to Laredo. It is also known as the Lloyd M. Bentsen Highway in honor of the late Democratic U.S. senator from Texas, who served from 1971 to 1992. This sign is located near Freer, the seat of Duval County east of Laredo.

U.S. Highway 59 (US 59) in the U.S. state of Texas is named the Lloyd Bentsen Highway, after Lloyd Bentsen, former U.S. senator from Texas. In northern Houston, US 59, co-signed with Interstate 69 (I-69), is the Eastex Freeway (from Downtown Houston to the Liberty–Montgomery county line). To the south, which is also co-signed with I-69, it is the Southwest Freeway (from Rosenberg to Downtown Houston). The stretch of the Southwest Freeway just west of The Loop was formerly one of the busiest freeways in North America, with a peak AADT of 371,000 in 1998.

US 59 (overlapped by US 71) actually straddles the border between Texas and Arkansas north of I-30 near Texarkana, with the east side of the highway on the Arkansas side and the west side of the highway on the Texas side. In the past, both highways remained on the border past I-30 as State Line Avenue to downtown Texarkana; today, only US 71 does so. Nearly 90 percent of this route is designated to become part of I-69 in the future. Currently 75-mile-per-hour (121 km/h) speed limits are allowed on US 59 in Duval County and portions of northern Polk County.

The total length of the southernmost segment of US 59 that passes through Texas and terminates at the Mexico–US border is 615 miles (990 km).

== History ==
The US 96 designation was originally applied in 1926 from Rosenberg, Texas, near Houston, to Pharr in the Rio Grande valley. This diagonal route, south of U.S. 90, did not violate the convention of even numbers for east–west routes. The highway's east–west nature was boosted in 1934 when US 96 was rerouted from Alice to Laredo.

US 59 was extended into Texas in 1936.

== Route description ==
=== Laredo to Interstate 37 ===
US 59 begins at the Mexican border with Loop 20 on the World Trade International Bridge over the Rio Grande in Laredo. The portion of US 59 that is co-signed with Loop 20 is also named the Bob Bullock Loop. At under two miles (3.2 km), the two highways run together concurrently with I-69W from the Mexican border until I-35 in Laredo, where I-69W temporarily ends. US 59 and Loop 20 continue to run together until just south of Lake Casa Blanca, where Loop 20 heads south to Mangana-Hein Road (and potentially into Mexico) and US 59 heads towards Freer; traveling in a mostly northeast direction. US 59 shares a short congruency with SH 44 in and around Freer. From Freer, US 59 passes through the southeastern part of McMullen County, but does not intersect any highways. The highway continues northeast, intersecting US 281 in George West, before intersecting I-37 about 55 miles (89 km) north of Corpus Christi. Between Laredo and I-37, US 59 passes through many rural areas and ranching sites. A significant portion of US 59 in Texas has a 75 miles per hour (121 km/h) speed limit.

=== Interstate 37 to Houston ===
From I-37, US 59 heads northeast passing through Beeville. US 59 bypasses Victoria to the south, and becomes a divided highway, and has a series of interchanges, until it becomes a freeway south of Houston in Rosenberg and resumes the designation of I-69. Between Houston and Victoria, US 59 passes through Edna, Ganado, El Campo, and Wharton. US 59 intersects many major Texas highways in Houston, including I-10 (which goes to San Antonio and Beaumont) and I-45 (which goes to Dallas and Galveston).

=== Houston to Marshall ===
Leaving Houston, US 59 intersects Beltway 8 again on the northside of town, passing by Bush Intercontinental Airport and heads into Humble. Between Houston and Livingston, most of US 59 is a limited-access freeway but the I-69 designation temporarily ends near the Liberty-San Jacinto county line. US 59 passes through or bypasses the towns of Cleveland, Shepherd before crossing the Trinity River, then US 59 passes through Livingston. 46 miles north of Livingston, US 59 bypasses Lufkin, where it overlaps US 69. After leaving Lufkin, US 59 crosses the Angelina River. Ten miles (16 km) north of Lufkin, US 59 bypasses Nacogdoches and heads in an almost entirely east–west direction. Drivers wishing to stay on US 59 must turn left in Tenaha, where the highway intersects US 96 and ends its overlap with US 84. US 59 passes through Carthage before intersecting I-20 south of Marshall.

=== Marshall to Texarkana ===
US 59 intersects US 80 in Marshall, where US 59 is known as East End Boulevard (due to the fact the highway runs on the east side of town, near the city limits). US 59 passes through Jefferson, 15 miles (24 km) west of Caddo Lake. US 59 passes through the towns of Linden and Atlanta before arriving in Bowie County. US 59 intersects SH 93 south of Texarkana, the old highway through the city. Shortly after, I-369 designation with US 59 when the freeway intersects Spur 151, where US 59 becomes a freeway on the westside of the city. Before US 59 intersects I-30, and overlaps I-30 until exit 223B, at the state line, I-369 designation ends. After leaving I-30, US 59 joins US 71, where both highways run on the state line between Texas and Arkansas, where both highways continue north towards DeQueen, Arkansas.

== Future ==
In 1991, Intermodal Surface Transportation Efficiency Act designated US 59 in Texas as a High Priority Corridor #18 for future Interstate Highway 69 being the designation as an extension of Interstate 69 out of Michigan and Indiana, with it being High Priority Corridor #20. I-69 east of Tenaha will follow US 84 to Louisiana state line then will be built on new alignment from there.

Most of US 59 is in the process of being upgraded between Laredo & Victoria, to become I-69W; Between Victoria & Tenaha, as I-69; and Tenaha & Texarkana, I-369. Segments of I-69 are currently designated: I-69W runs between Mexico and I-35, I-69 runs through the Houston Metro, and a segment of I-369 exists on the west side of Texarkana. Some cities are going to be bypassed, dubbed as "relief routes," such Diboll, the Diboll bypass is under construction and is scheduled for completion in 2025. US 59 was redesignated on the unfinished bypass on May 25, 2023 with the former alignment becoming Bus. US 59-H. A bypass for Corrigan started construction in late 2022 and is scheduled for completion in 2028. More projects for future I-69 corridors are planned but not in the works as the entire I-69 project in Texas does not have dedicated funding to complete the entire project.

== Exit list ==
County	Location	mi (Note: Mileposts along US 59 either reflect I-69W, I-69, US 59 or any lower number U.S. Highways that US 59 may be concurrent with. U.S. Highway mileposts start at 0.000 from the northern terminus in Texas.)	km	Exit	Destinations	Notes
Webb	Laredo	0.000	0.000	World Trade Bridge over Rio Grande western end of I-69W / Loop 20 concurrency		
See Interstate 69W for concurrency
Webb	Laredo	1.353– 1.753 (Note: Mileposts change to reflect US 59.)	2.177– 2.821	2	I-35 / US 83 – San Antonio, Laredo I-69W south	Current eastern end of I-69W concurrency; signed as exit 2A (north) and 2B (south) on I-69W side; I-35 exit 8; interchange
Webb	Laredo	3.668– 3.007	5.903– 4.839	3	Sandia Drive / McPherson Road	Interchange
Webb	Laredo	4.691	7.549	4	International Boulevard	Southbound entrance and northbound exit; interchange
Webb	Laredo	5.729	9.220	Eastern end of freeway		
Webb	Laredo	11.18	17.99	11	Bus. US 59-Z west (Saunders Street) / Loop 20 south (Bob Bullock Loop) to I-35	Eastern end of Loop 20 concurrency; interchange
Webb		29.913	48.140		FM 2895 south – Aguilares	
Webb		41.148	66.221		FM 2050 south – Bruni	
Duval		54.4	87.5		SH 44 west – Encinal	Southern end of SH 44 concurrency
Duval	Freer	57.4	92.4		SH 16 – Tilden, Hebbronville, Falfurrias	
Duval		58.8	94.6		SH 44 east – San Diego	Northern end of SH 44 concurrency
Duval		72.4	116.5		FM 2359 west to SH 16	
McMullen	No major junctions					
Live Oak		85.2	137.1		FM 624 to SH 16 – Orange Grove, Cotulla	
Live Oak		89.4	143.9		FM 1359 south – Clegg	
Live Oak		102.6	165.1		FM 3336 west	
Live Oak	George West	105.3	169.5		Future I-69C south / US 281 / Bus. US 59-X north – Alice, Three Rivers	Future northern end of I-69C
Live Oak	George West	106.2	170.9		Bus. US 59-X south – George West	
Live Oak		107.6	173.2		FM 799 east – Beeville	Southern end of FM 799 concurrency
Live Oak		107.9	173.6		FM 799 west	Northern end of FM 799 concurrency
Live Oak		110.8	178.3		I-37 – San Antonio, Corpus Christi	I-37 exit 56
Live Oak		114.3	183.9		FM 1596 north	
Bee					FM 796 south – Tynan	
Bee					FM 1349 south	
Bee	Blue Berry Hill				FM 351 (truck route)	
Bee	Beeville				FM 673 north (Minnesota Street)	
Bee	Beeville				Bus. US 181 / SH 202 east (Washington Street)	
Bee	Beeville				US 181 (truck route) – Kenedy, Karnes City, Skidmore	Interchange
Goliad	Berclair				FM 883 west – Goliad County Airport	
Goliad					FM 1351 west – Goliad County Airport	
Goliad					SH 239 west – Charco, Kenedy	Southern end of SH 239 concurrency
Goliad					FM 1726 north	
Goliad	Goliad				US 77 Alt. / US 183 / SH 239 east – Cuero, Refugio, Goliad State Historical Park, Presidio Labahia, General Zaragoza Birthplace	Northern end of SH 239 concurrency
Goliad	Fannin				FM 2987 – Fannin	Interchange
Victoria	Victoria	177.9	286.3	3	US 77 north / Bus. US 59-T north – Cuero, Hallettsville	Northern end of US 77 concurrency; interchange
Victoria	Victoria			4	FM 446	
Victoria	Victoria			6	US 77 south / Bus. US 77 north – Refugio, Corpus Christi	Southern end of US 77 concurrency; interchange
Victoria	Victoria			7	US 77 south (via Spur 91) – Refugio, Corpus Christi	Interchange; southbound exit and northbound entrance; future I-69E south; future I-69W west; future southern end of I-69
Victoria	Victoria			11	SH 185 – Victoria, Seadrift	Interchange
Victoria	Victoria			12	US 87 – Victoria, Port Lavaca	Interchange
Victoria	Victoria			15	Loop 463 / Burroughsville Road – Hallettsville, Cuero	Interchange
Victoria	Telferner			19	Bus. US 59-T / FM 1686 south – Victoria, Telferner	Interchange
Victoria	Inez			26	FM 444 – Inez	Interchange
Jackson				30	FM 234 north	Interchange
Jackson	El Toro			32	FM 234 – El Toro, Vanderbilt	Interchange
Jackson	Edna			34	Loop 521 – Edna	Interchange
Jackson	Edna			36	SH 111 / FM 822 – Edna, Yoakum, Bay City	Interchange
Jackson	Edna			38	Loop 521 – Edna	Interchange
Jackson				40	FM 530 – Cordele, Hallettsville	Interchange
Jackson	Ganado			44	Loop 522 – Ganado	Interchange
Jackson	Ganado			46	SH 172 / FM 710 – Ganado, La Ward	Interchange
Jackson	Ganado			47	Loop 522 – Ganado	Interchange
Wharton	Louise			51	Loop 523 / FM 647	No northbound entrance; interchange
Wharton	Louise			52	County Road 319	Interchange
Wharton	Louise			54	Loop 523 / FM 1160	Interchange
Wharton	Hillje			57	Loop 524 / FM 441	Interchange
Wharton	El Campo			59	Bus. US 59-S – El Campo	Interchange
Wharton	El Campo			60	FM 1163	Interchange
Wharton	El Campo			61	SH 71 – Columbus, Palacios	Interchange
Wharton	El Campo			62	FM 1162	Interchange
Wharton	El Campo			64	Bus. US 59-S / FM 960	Interchange
Wharton	Pierce			66	Loop 526 – Pierce	
Wharton	Wharton			70	Bus. US 59-R / FM 961 north / SH 60 – Wharton, Bay City	Interchange
Wharton	Wharton			72	FM 102 – Wharton, Eagle Lake	Interchange
Wharton				75	Bus. US 59-R / SH 60 – Wharton, Bay City	Interchange
Wharton	Hungerford			77	FM 1161	Interchange
Wharton	Hungerford			79	Bus. US 59-R – Hungerford	Southbound access only; to be converted into full interchange
Wharton				82	County Road 212	Interchange under construction
Fort Bend	Kendleton			83	FM 2919 – Kendleton	
Fort Bend				86	Loop 541 (Doris Road) – Kendleton	
Fort Bend	Beasley			89	FM 360 / Loop 540 – Needville	
Fort Bend	Beasley			90	Isleib Road	
Fort Bend	Beasley			92	Loop 540 / Daily Road / Hamlink Road	Southbound exit only
Fort Bend	Rosenberg			93	Spur 10 (Hartledge Road / Stade Road)	
Fort Bend	Rosenberg			94	Spur 529 north / Cottonwood Church Road / Kroesche Road I-69 north	Current southern terminus of I-69; US 59 continues south; southbound exit signed for Spur 10
See Interstate 69 for concurrency
San Jacinto					FM 2914 east to FM 3460	
San Jacinto	Shepherd			453A; 453B	Loop 424 / FM 3460 – Shepherd	Interchange; signed as exits 453A southbound and 453B northbound
San Jacinto	Shepherd			451C	Frontage Road	Southbound exit only
San Jacinto	Shepherd			451B	SH 150 / FM 223 – Rye, Shepherd, Coldspring	Interchange; signed as exit 451B northbound; not signed southbound
San Jacinto	Shepherd				Loop 424	no left turn northbound
San Jacinto					FM 1127 east	
Trinity River				US 59 Trinity River Bridge		
Polk	Goodrich				Loop 393 north	
Polk	Goodrich			195	FM 1988 to FM 2665	Interchange
Polk	Goodrich				Loop 393 south – Goodrich	
Polk	Livingston			436A; 436B	Bus. US 59-J / FM 1988 north – Livingston, Woodville, Lake Livingston State Park	Interchange; southern end of freeway; signed as exits 436A southbound and 436B northbound to I-69 Bus./US 59 Bus.; no exit number signed for US 59 north to FM 1988
Polk	Livingston			436D; 434B	Frontage Road	Signed as exits 434B southbound and 436D northbound
Polk	Livingston				US 190 – Huntsville, Livingston, Jasper	
Polk	Livingston			434D; 432B	Frontage Road – Pedigo Park	Signed as exits 432B (on US 59 south) and 434D (on US 59 north), access to Memorial Medical Center
Polk	Livingston			(431)	SH 146 south / Bus. US 59-J – Downtown Livingston, Liberty	Interchange; northern end of freeway; no direct northbound exit (signed at exit 434D)
Polk					Loop 116 north	
Polk	Leggett				Loop 116 south	
Polk	Leggett				FM 942 north – Camden, Corrigan	Southern end of FM 942 concurrency
Polk	Leggett				FM 942 south	Northern end of FM 942 concurrency
Polk	Moscow				FM 62 east – Camden	
Polk	Moscow				Loop 177	
Polk	Moscow				FM 350 south – Livingston	
Polk				(414A)	Bus. US 59 north – Corrigan	
Polk	Corrigan				FM 942 south – Camden, Leggett	
Polk	Corrigan			(412A)	US 287 – Groveton, Corrigan	
Polk	Corrigan				US 287 – Groveton, Woodville	
Polk	Corrigan				FM 352 east (Stryker Road)	
Polk					FM 1987 north – Damascus	
Polk				(410A)	Turnaround	
Polk				(409A)	Bus. US 59 south – Corrigan	
Polk					FM 357 north / FM 1987 south – Wakefield, Damascus	
Angelina	Diboll			(401)	Bus. US 59 north (South Temple Drive)	Diboll/Burke Bypass
Angelina	Diboll			(398)	FM 1818 (Dennis Street)	Diboll/Burke Bypass
Angelina	Diboll			(396)	Lumberjack Drive	Diboll/Burke Bypass
Angelina	Burke			(395)	Bus. US 59 south / FM 2108	Diboll/Burke Bypass
Angelina					FM 324 north	
Angelina	Lufkin				FM 819 (College Drive) – Angelina College	Future interchange
Angelina	Lufkin			391	FM 3482 (Whitehouse Drive)	Interchange; southern end of freeway
Angelina	Lufkin			390	Bus. US 59-G north (South First Street) / Loop 287 west	Southern end of Loop 287 concurrency; US 59 north follows exit 390; access to FM 1877; access to Woodland Heights Medical Center
Angelina	Lufkin			(389B)	Tulane Drive	No direct northbound exit
Angelina	Lufkin			(389A)	FM 58 (Chestnut Street)	Interchange; northern end of freeway
Angelina	Lufkin			(388)	US 69 south (US 69 Bus. north) – Huntington, Woodville, Beaumont	Southern end of US 69 concurrency; interchange
Angelina	Lufkin			(387)	FM 841 (Ford Chapel Road)	Interchange
Angelina	Lufkin			(386)	FM 325 (Lufkin Avenue)	Interchange; no direct northbound exit (signed at FM 841)
Angelina	Lufkin			(385)	SH 103 (Atkinson Drive) – Etoile, Milam	Interchange
Angelina	Lufkin			(384)	US 69 north / Loop 287 west / Bus. US 59-G south / FM 2021 / FM 3521 east – Tyler, Dallas, Crockett	Northern end of US Bus. 69 / Loop 287 concurrency; access to FM 2021 west and FM 3521 east; US 59 north follows exit 386B; interchange
Angelina					FM 3439	
Angelina	Redland			(382)	FM 2021 – Pollok	
Angelina					FM 843 west	
Angelina River				Angelina River Bridge		
Nacogdoches					FM 2782 north	
Nacogdoches	Nacogdoches			(370)	Bus. US 59-F north (South Street)	Future interchange
Nacogdoches	Nacogdoches				Bus. US 59-F north (South Street) / SH 7 / SH 21 west / Loop 224 east – San Augustine, Center	Southern end of SH 7/SH 21/Loop 224 concurrency; US 59 south follows exit; interchange
Nacogdoches	Nacogdoches			(368)	SH 7 / SH 21 west / Loop 224 east	Future interchange; access to SH 7/SH 21 east and Loop 224 west will be via the interchange with Future Bus US 59-F north (currently US 59)
Nacogdoches	Nacogdoches				SH 7 west / Bus. SH 7-N east (Fredonia Street) – Pollok, Crockett, Airport	Northern end of SH 7 concurrency; interchange
Nacogdoches	Nacogdoches				FM 225 (Durst Street) – Douglass, Cushing	Interchange
Nacogdoches	Nacogdoches				SH 21 west / Bus. SH 21-P east (Douglass Road) – Alto, Crockett, Elkhart	Northern end of SH 21 concurrency; interchange
Nacogdoches	Nacogdoches				FM 2609 north (Austin Street)	Northbound access only
Nacogdoches	Nacogdoches				FM 1638 (Old Tyler Road) / FM 3314 (Lone Star Road)	Interchange
Nacogdoches	Nacogdoches				Loop 224 west (Stallings Drive) / Westward Drive	Northern end of Loop 224 concurrency; interchange
Nacogdoches					FM 343 (Industrial Boulevard) – Cushing	Interchange
Nacogdoches	Redfield				US 259 north / Bus. US 59-F – Henderson, Longview, Nacogdoches, SFASU	Interchange
Nacogdoches					FM 2864 north	
Nacogdoches	Appleby				FM 941 south	
Nacogdoches					FM 2435 north	
Nacogdoches					FM 2476 south	
Nacogdoches	Garrison				FM 95 south – Chireno	Southern end of FM 95 concurrency
Nacogdoches	Garrison				FM 138 east – Center	
Nacogdoches	Garrison				FM 95 north – Concord	Northern end of FM 95 concurrency
Rusk	No major junctions					
Shelby					FM 2667 south – Blair	
Shelby	Timpson				US 84 west – Rusk, Palestine	Southern end of US 84 concurrency
Shelby	Timpson				SH 87 south – Center, Hemphill	
Shelby	Timpson				FM 947 east – Tenaha	
Shelby	Timpson				Spur 470 south	
Shelby					FM 1645 south	
Shelby	Tenaha				FM 2141 south	
Shelby	Tenaha				FM 947 west (West Drive) – Timpson	Southern end of FM 947 concurrency
Shelby	Tenaha				FM 947 east (Main Street)	Northern end of FM 947 concurrency
Shelby	Tenaha				Loop 157 (Center Street) – Center, Marshall	
Shelby	Tenaha				Future I-69 north / US 84 east / US 96 south – Logansport, Mansfield, Center, Jasper	Northern end of US 84 concurrency; future northern end of I-69 concurrency; future southern end of I-369 concurrency; US 84 to the east will be upgraded to I-69 in the future; interchange
Shelby	Tenaha				Loop 157 south (North Center Street) – Center	
Panola					FM 999 west – Gary, Lake Murvaul	
Panola					FM 2517 – Deadwood	
Panola	Carthage				Bus. US 59-G north / Loop 436 north to SH 149 – Mount Enterprise, Henderson, Longview	Interchange
Panola	Carthage				FM 699 / Forsythe Street – Paxton, Center	
Panola	Carthage				US 79 north / Bus. US 79 south / Shelby Street – Greenwood, Shreveport	Southern end of US 79 concurrency; interchange
Panola	Carthage				US 79 south / Bus. US 59-G south – Henderson, Tatum, Panola College	Northern end of US 79 concurrency; interchange
Panola					FM 124 west – Beckville	
Panola	Grand Bluff				FM 2792 north	
Panola	Grand Bluff				FM 1794 – Tatum, De Berry	To be converted into an interchange by May 2025
Harrison					FM 1186 south	
Harrison					FM 2983 north	
Harrison					FM 2625 – Darco, Crossroads, Waskom	
Harrison	Marshall				I-20 – Longview, Dallas, Shreveport	I-20 exit 617
Harrison	Marshall				SH 43 south (East Pinecrest Drive) – Henderson, Tatum, Wiley College	Southern end of SH 43 concurrency
Harrison	Marshall				FM 31 south (East Travis Street) – Elysian Fields, Starr State Historical Park, De Berry	
Harrison	Marshall				US 80 (East Grand Avenue / Victory Drive) – Hallsville, Longview, Waskom	
Harrison	Marshall				SH 43 north (Karnack Highway) – Karnack, Caddo Lake, Caddo Lake State Park, Atlanta	Northern end of SH 43 concurrency
Harrison	Marshall				Loop 390 (Ernest F. Smith Parkway) to US 80 – Longview, Gilmer, Shreveport, East Texas Baptist University, Karnack	
Harrison					FM 1793 north	
Harrison	Woodlawn				FM 1997 south	
Marion					FM 2208 – Karnack, Jefferson Historical Riverfront District, Cypress River Airport, Longview	
Marion	Jefferson				SH 49 / FM 134 south (Broadway) – Daingerfield, Lake O' The Pines, Jefferson Historical Riverfront District, Vivian	
Marion					FM 1324 east	
Cass					FM 2683 east – Lodi	
Cass	Linden				SH 155 to SH 8 – New Boston, Gilmer	
Cass	Linden				FM Spur 125 north (South Main Street)	
Cass	Linden				FM 125 (Kildare Road) – Business District, Kildare, Mc Leod	
Cass	Linden				FM 1841 east – Bivins, Atlanta	
Cass	Linden				SH 11 west (East Houston Street) – Hughes Springs, Pittsburg	
Cass					FM 2328 south	Southern end of FM 2328 concurrency
Cass					FM 2328 north – Laws Chapel	Northern end of FM 2328 concurrency
Cass	Atlanta				SH 77 west – Naples, Douglassville	Southern end of SH 77 concurrency
Cass	Atlanta				SH 77 east (Pinecrest Drive) / FM 249 east (West Main Street) to SH 43 – Downtown Atlanta, Shreveport, Vivian	Northern end of SH 77 concurrency
Cass	Atlanta				SH 43 south (Louise Street) – Downtown Atlanta, Marshall	
Cass	Queen City				Loop 236 north / FM 2791 west (Hickory Street) – Antioch, Douglassville, Queen City, Bloomburg	
Cass	Queen City				FM 96 west (Lanark Street) – Wright Patman Lake South Shore, Atlanta State Park	
Cass	Queen City				Loop 236 south – Queen City	
Cass	Queen City				FM 2327 north – Springdale	
Cass					FM 2327 south – Springdale	
Cass					FM 3129 south – Domino, Bloomburg	Interchange
Bowie					FM 2148 west – Wright Patman Lake North Shore, Redwater	
Bowie					FM 3244 east	
Bowie					FM 2516 east (Buchanan Loop Road)	
Bowie	Eylau				FM 989 (Kings Highway) – Wake Village, Nash	
Bowie	Texarkana				SH 93 north (Lake Drive) / Loop 151 east (South Bishop Road) to I-30 east / US 71 / FM 3527 (Leopard Drive) – Downtown Texarkana, Little Rock, Shreveport I-369 north	Current southern end of I-369 concurrency; interchange
Bowie	Texarkana	See Interstate 369 for concurrency				
Bowie	Texarkana				I-30 west – Dallas I-369 south	Northern end of I-369 concurrency; southern end of I-30 concurrency; US 59 south follows exit 220A
Bowie	Texarkana			220B	FM 559 (Richmond Road) / Pavilion Parkway	
Bowie	Texarkana			222	SH 93 / FM 1397 (Summerhill Road)	
Bowie	Texarkana	622.736	1,002.196		I-30 east – Little Rock US 71 south (State Line Avenue south) US 59 north / US 71 north (State Line Avenue north) – Ashdown	Northern end of I-30 concurrency; southern end of US 71 concurrency; US 59 north follows exit 223; Arkansas state line
1.000 mi = 1.609 km; 1.000 km = 0.621 mi: Concurrency terminus; Incomplete access; Tolled; Unopened

== Business routes ==
US 59 has thirteen designated business routes in Texas, between Marshall and its southern terminus in Laredo.

== Notes ==
U.S. Route 59
Previous state: Terminus	Texas	Next state: Arkansas
