= Jason Peters =

American football player (born 1982)

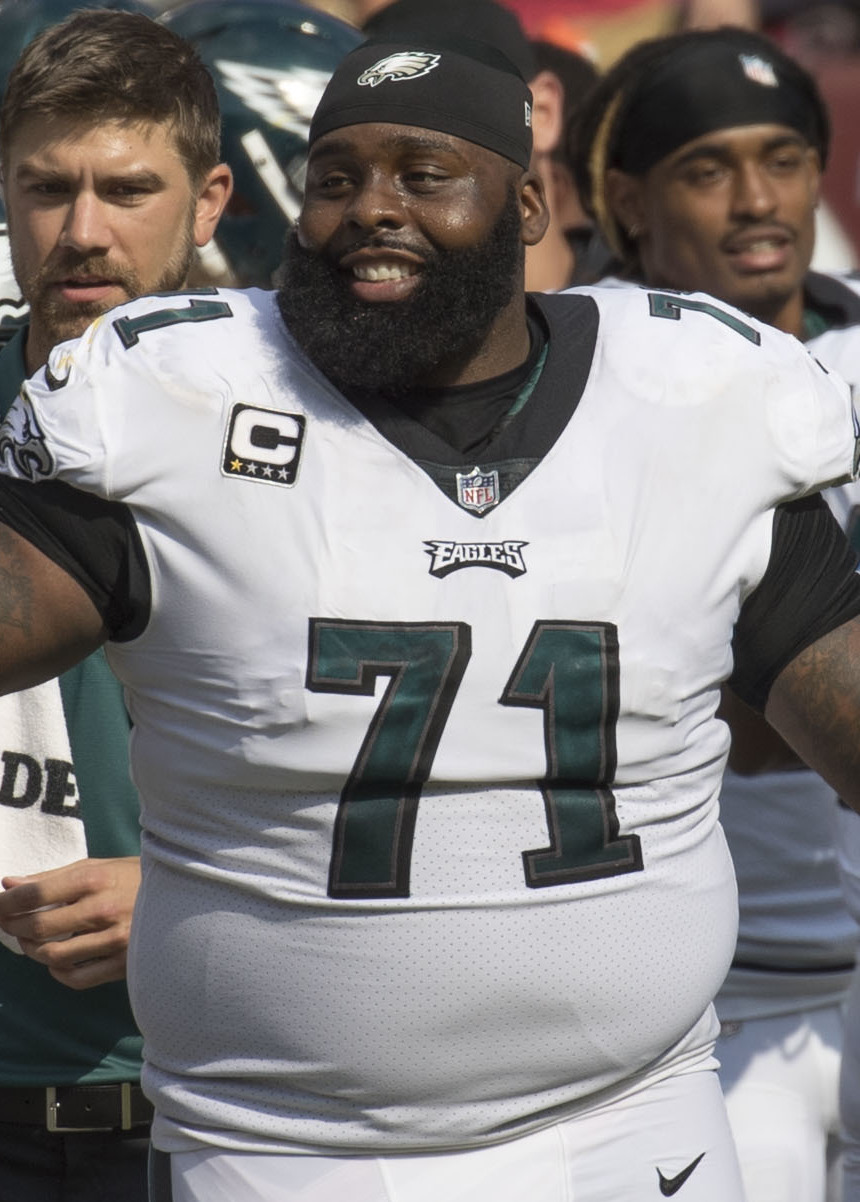
- Peters with the Philadelphia Eagles in 2017

No. 71, 70, 73
- Position: Offensive tackle

Personal information
- Born: January 22, 1982 (age 44); Queen City, Texas, U.S.
- Listed height: 6 ft 4 in (1.93 m)
- Listed weight: 328 lb (149 kg)

Career information
- High school: Queen City
- College: Arkansas (2000–2003)
- NFL draft: 2004: undrafted

Career history
- Buffalo Bills (2004–2008); Philadelphia Eagles (2009–2020); Chicago Bears (2021); Dallas Cowboys (2022); Seattle Seahawks (2023–2024)

Awards and highlights
- Super Bowl champion (LII); 2× First-team All-Pro (2011, 2013); 4× Second-team All-Pro (2007, 2008, 2010, 2014); 9× Pro Bowl (2007–2011, 2013–2016); NFL 2010s All-Decade Team; Second-team All-SEC (2003)

Career NFL statistics
- Games played: 248
- Games started: 221
- Fumble recoveries: 6
- Touchdowns: 2
- Stats at Pro Football Reference

Jason Raynard Peters (born January 22, 1982) is an American former professional football player who was an offensive tackle for 21 seasons in the National Football League (NFL). He played college football for the Arkansas Razorbacks and was signed as an offensive tackle by the Buffalo Bills as an undrafted free agent after the 2004 NFL draft. He was later traded to the Philadelphia Eagles in 2009 and spent the next twelve seasons playing for them. He would later be a member of the Chicago Bears in 2021, the Dallas Cowboys in 2022, and the Seattle Seahawks in 2023. Peters was a nine-time Pro Bowler, a six-time All-Pro, and was named to the NFL 2010s All-Decade Team.

== College career ==
After starting in both football and basketball at Queen City High School (TX), Peters attended the University of Arkansas and played for the Arkansas Razorbacks football team. Originally recruited as a defensive tackle, he spent his freshman campaign as a reserve defensive lineman. He was then moved to the tight end spot, where he caught four passes for 37 yards as a sophomore. In his junior season, Peters registered 21 catches for 218 yards and four touchdowns, which earned him a second-team All-Southeastern Conference selection.

== Professional career ==
=== Pre-draft ===
Following his junior year, Peters decided forgo his last season and enter the 2004 NFL Draft. As a fairly athletic tight end at more than 320 pounds, Peters was seen as "a clone of former Denver Broncos giant Orson Mobley." Though Peters was a tight end in college, he was primarily used as an extra blocker on the end of the o-line for Arkansas' rushing oriented offense. Since he registered far more knockdown blocks (61) than catches (21) as a junior, Peters spent much time prior to the draft working O-line drills, preparing himself to probably be an offensive tackle in the NFL. His position became problematic as a tweener that was too large to be a prototypical tight end, but had no experience playing an offensive lineman. He participated at the NFL Scouting Combine and impressively ran a 4.93s in the 40-yard dash, confusing more scouts and experts due to his speed and athleticism. Sports Illustrated projected Peters to be selected in the fourth round of the draft.

"He's what they call a 'jumbo athlete'. Very agile. Catches the ball well. Blocking? He's probably not as good as what people expect to see, as far as playing tackle. Plus, from everything I know, his mentality is more to be a skilled-position player. He'll be intriguing to watch the next couple of years, to see what he develops into."

— Phil Savage, Baltimore Ravens' director of player personnel

Pre-draft measurables
Height	Weight	Arm length	Hand span	40-yard dash	10-yard split	20-yard split	20-yard shuttle	Three-cone drill	Vertical jump	Broad jump	Bench press
6 ft 4 1/2 in (1.94 m)	328 lb (149 kg)	33 1/8 in (0.84 m)	9 3/8 in (0.24 m)	4.89 s	1.73 s	2.91 s	4.75 s	7.70 s	33.5 in (0.85 m)	9 ft 7 in (2.92 m)	25 reps
All values from NFL Combine/Pro Day

=== Buffalo Bills ===
He would not be selected in the 2004 NFL draft and became an undrafted free agent with offers from about 20 NFL teams. On April 26, 2004, the Buffalo Bills signed Peters as an undrafted rookie free agent to a two–year, $540,000 contract that included a signing bonus of $5,000.

"He was a phenom on special teams. He did everything—covered kicks, and he was on the punt block team. One year in Cincinnati, we beat Cincinnati, he got through and blocked a punt. He was a phenomenal athlete."

— Tom Donahoe, Buffalo Bills general manager

He was cut then re-signed to the Bills' practice squad. He was signed to the active roster on November 12, 2004. Peters made his mark on special teams as a wedge buster on kickoffs and as a blocking tight end, while beginning to learn to play offensive tackle under the tutelage of offensive line coach Jim McNally.

On July 14, 2006, the Bills signed Peters to a five–year, $16.5 million contract extension that included an initial signing bonus of $1.5 million.

In 2006, Peters beat out former Texas star Mike Williams for starting right tackle on the Bills. In 2007, Peters began the season entrenched as the starting right tackle. After Week 7, the Bills reshuffled their offensive line to better protect quarterback J. P. Losman. Peters was moved to left tackle, replacing Mike Gandy who moved inside to left guard.

After the 2006 season, Sports Illustrated's Paul Zimmerman debated selecting Peters to his All-Pro team. "I was rooting for the Bills' Jason Peters, whom I would have loved to pick, but he isn't there yet. Very athletic, but not enough of a roughneck." Peters allowed only two sacks in that season and was not called for a holding penalty.

In 2007, Peters was selected to start at left tackle in the Pro Bowl for the American Football Conference team. He injured his groin in a game against the New York Giants, and was unable to attend the Pro Bowl game. He was the first Bills offensive lineman to make the Pro Bowl since Ruben Brown in 2003.

Entering the 2008 offseason, Peters was unhappy with his contract from 2006 after he was named to two Pro Bowls and had started at left tackle for 45 games over the last three seasons before injuring his knee at the end of the 2007 NFL season. At the time, Peters still had two–years remaining from his current contract and was due to make $3.8 million in total. He demanded a new contract, but after no deal was met he chose to holdout and refused to report to any of the Bills' offseason workouts and their mandatory mini camps. He reportedly was seeking a new contract in between $8 million and $11.5 million per season. On July 25, 2008, the NFL Network's Adam Schefter reported he was informed Peters would continue his contract holdout and refused to report to the Bills' training camp. On September 5, 2008, Peters ended his holdout and returned to the Bills' in time for the regular season opener after he missed the entire training camp and preseason. Peters was fined about $550,000 for missing all of training camp, but if he had missed a regular season game, he would have been fined $191,000 for each game he missed.

Peters was selected as the starting left tackle in the Pro Bowl and was a Second-team All-Pro for the 2008 season.

=== Philadelphia Eagles ===
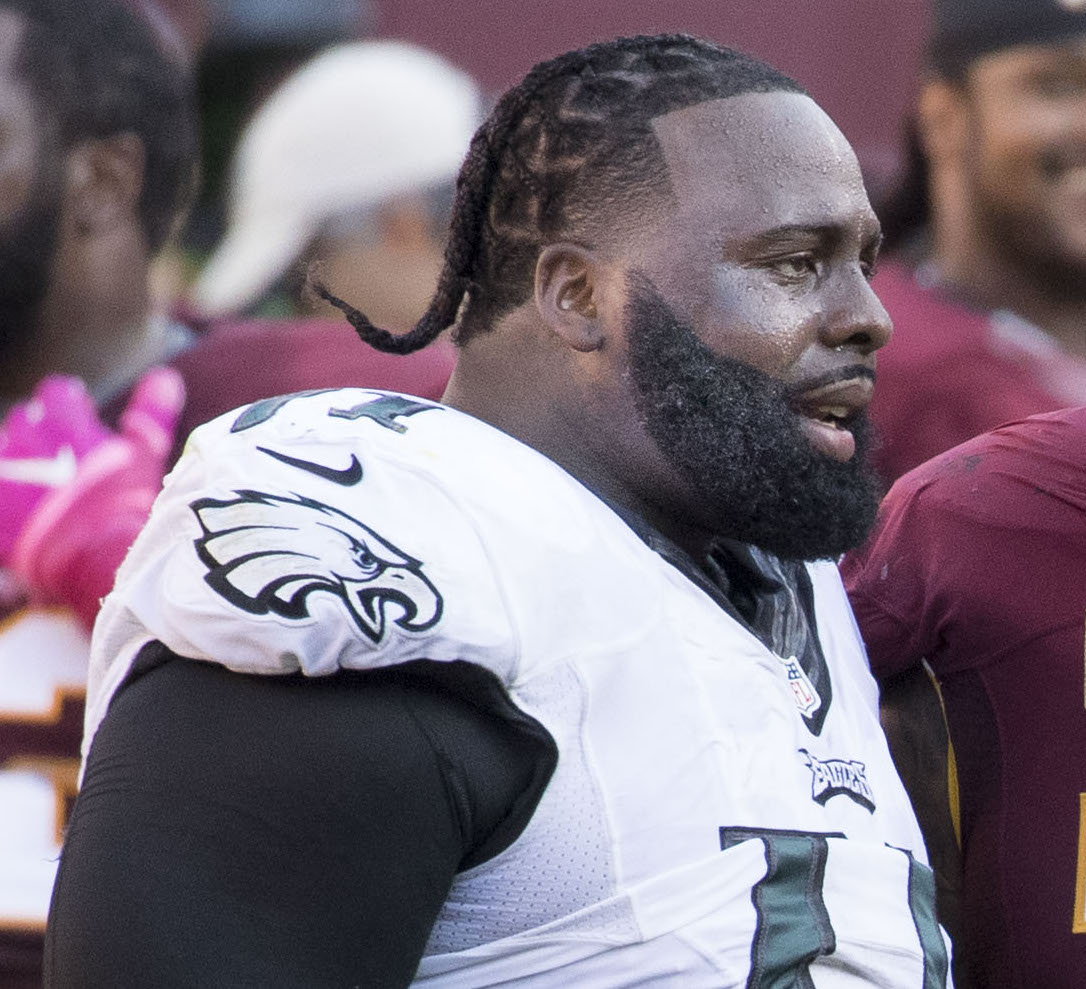
Peters in 2016

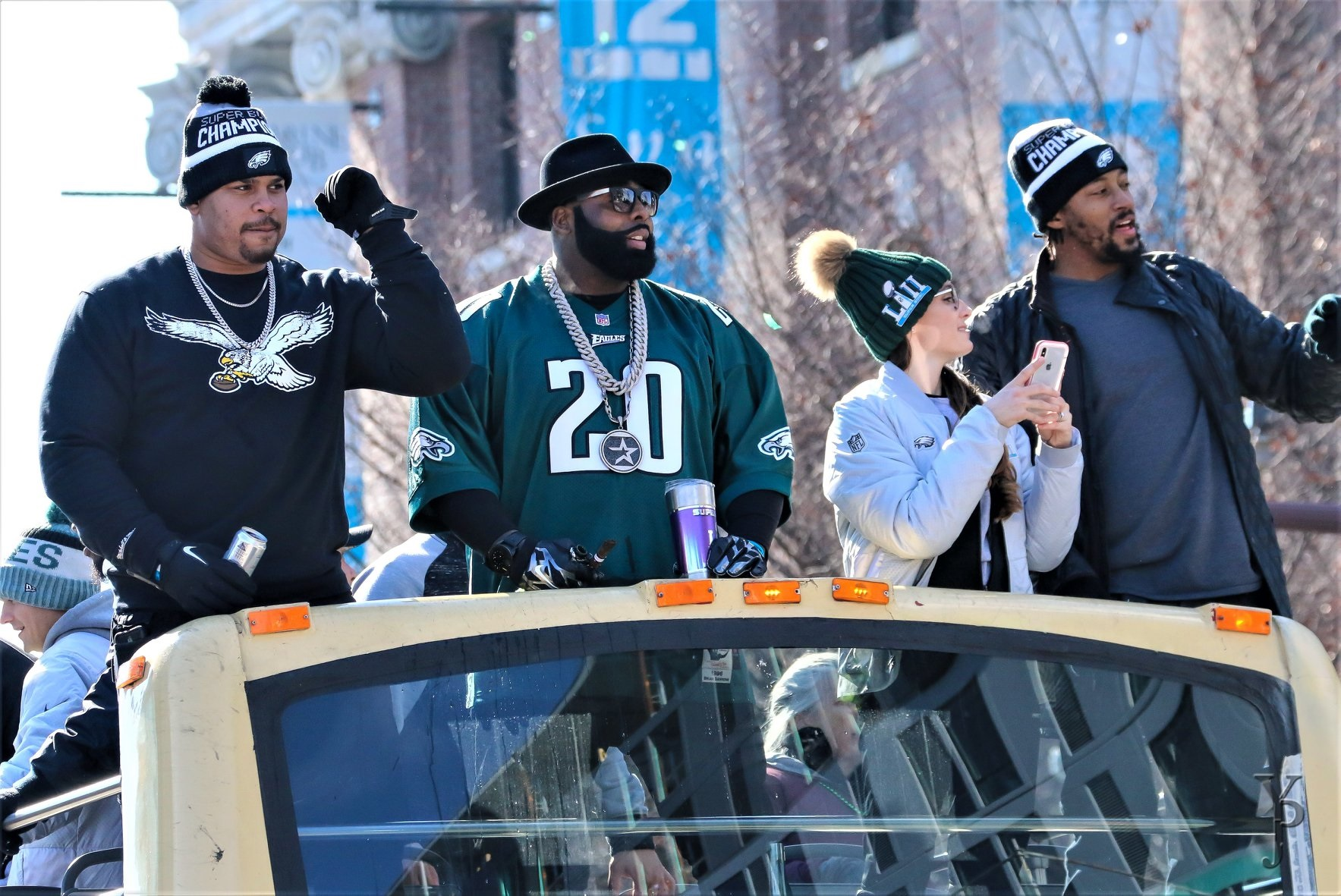
Peters (center-left) during the Eagles' Super Bowl LII victory parade

On April 17, 2009, the Bills traded Peters to the Philadelphia Eagles and received their first-round pick (28th overall, used to select center Eric Wood) and fourth-round pick (121st overall, used to select tight end Shawn Nelson) in the 2009 NFL draft and a conditional sixth-round pick in the 2010 NFL draft (used to select linebacker Danny Batten). Peters had been unhappy with his contract and had not been attending the Bills' offseason activities after staging a holdout in 2008 during training camp.

Upon the trade becoming official, the Eagles signed Peters to a six–year, $60 million contract that included $25 million guaranteed. The contract restructured the remaining two years from Peters' previous deal with the Buffalo Bills and added a four-year extension that had a maximum value of $60 million total after potential incentives and bonuses were included.. Head coach Andy Reid added, "Jason Peters is the best left tackle in football. He is a powerful and athletic tackle and I have admired his play over the last few years on film."

Peters was selected to the 2010 Pro Bowl and 2011 Pro Bowl as a starter and was a 2010 second-team All-Pro selection. On March 28, 2012, Peters ruptured his Achilles tendon during an offseason workout. He ruptured it a second time in May 2012 after the equipment he was using to move around his house malfunctioned. He was placed on the active/non-football injury list on July 22, 2012, before the start of training camp.

On February 26, 2014, Peters signed a new five-year deal worth $51.3 million with the Eagles.

During a game against the Washington Redskins on September 21, 2014, Redskins player Chris Baker took out Eagles quarterback Nick Foles with an illegal hit. Following the hit, a brawl broke out on the sidelines between both teams. Baker was confronted by Peters, who then took a swing at Baker which resulted in both players getting ejected in the scuffle. On September 27, 2014, Peters was fined $10,000.

On June 14, 2017, Peters signed a one-year contract extension with the Eagles through the 2019 season. On October 23, 2017, during Monday Night Football against the Redskins, Peters left the game with an apparent right knee injury. The next night, it was revealed that his right knee had tears to the ACL and MCL, which ended his 2017 season. The Eagles went on to win Super Bowl LII against the New England Patriots 41–33, giving Peters his first Super Bowl ring.

On March 11, 2019, the Eagles signed Peters on a one-year contract for the 2019 season. On July 17, 2020, Peters signed another one-year contract with the Eagles. He was set to start at right guard following a season-ending injury to Brandon Brooks, but was moved back to left tackle following a season-ending injury to Andre Dillard. He was given a restructured contract after his move to left tackle on September 10, 2020. He was placed on injured reserve on October 3, 2020, with a foot injury. He was activated on October 31, 2020. He was placed back on injured reserve on December 12, 2020, ending his season.

=== Chicago Bears ===
On August 16, 2021, Peters signed with the Chicago Bears, after the team was decimated with injuries at the left tackle position. He reunited with head coach Matt Nagy and offensive line coach Juan Castillo, both of whom were Eagles assistants in Peters' first years with the Eagles.

In Week 1 against the Los Angeles Rams, he suffered a quadriceps injury in the second quarter and was replaced with rookie Larry Borom and Elijah Wilkinson. In Week 14 against the Green Bay Packers, he suffered a high ankle sprain in the first quarter and was replaced with rookie Teven Jenkins. Jenkins also started the next two games, before Peters returned to the starting lineup. He started in 15 out of 17 games for the team. He was not re-signed after the season.

=== Dallas Cowboys ===
On September 5, 2022, Peters signed with the Dallas Cowboys practice squad to provide depth while Tyron Smith recovered from his torn hamstring injury and to improve his conditioning form. He was promoted to the active roster on September 26. He also served as a mentor to rookie offensive tackle Tyler Smith. In Week 3 against the New York Giants, he played 14 snaps at left guard, becoming just the sixth offensive lineman (Andrew Whitworth, Ray Brown, Bruce Matthews, Jackie Slater and Jeff Van Note) to play an NFL game in his 40s.

In Week 14 against the Houston Texans, Josh Ball replaced an injured Terence Steele (tore both the ACL and MCL in his left knee), but he struggled so much that Peters was forced to play at right tackle for the first time since 2006 on the eventual game-winning drive. In Week 17 against the Tennessee Titans, a high ankle sprain injury to center Tyler Biadasz led to a three-player shuffle on the offensive line, which included Peters playing at left tackle. In Week 18 against the Washington Commanders, he started at left tackle. He played sparingly during the season (10 games with one start), suffering multiple injuries, including one on his hip, that kept him out of the divisional playoff round loss to the San Francisco 49ers. He was not re-signed after the season.

=== Seattle Seahawks ===
With Tom Brady's retirement from the NFL on February 1, Peters became the oldest active NFL player at 41 years old.

On September 11, 2023, the Seattle Seahawks hosted Peters for a workout. One day later on September 12, he signed with the team's practice squad after injuries forced both of Seattle's starting tackles, second-year players Abraham Lucas and Charles Cross, out of their Week 1 game against the Los Angeles Rams. He was signed to the active roster on November 18. He became a free agent after the 2023 season.

On October 1, 2024, Peters was re-signed to the Seahawks practice squad. He was placed on practice squad injured reserve on December 6, 2024.

=== Retirement ===
Peters announced his retirement after 21 NFL seasons on February 25, 2025, to take a job in the Seahawks' front office.

=== NFL career statistics ===
Year	Team	Games	Starts
2004	BUF	5	1
2005	BUF	16	10
2006	BUF	16	16
2007	BUF	15	15
2008	BUF	13	13
2009	PHI	15	15
2010	PHI	14	14
2011	PHI	13	13
2013	PHI	16	16
2014	PHI	16	16
2015	PHI	14	14
2016	PHI	16	16
2017	PHI	7	7
2018	PHI	16	16
2019	PHI	13	13
2020	PHI	8	8
2021	CHI	15	15
2022	DAL	12	1
2023	SEA	8	2
Career		248	221

== Personal life ==
Peters was arrested and charged with playing loud music and disturbing the peace on March 26, 2011, in Shreveport, Louisiana. He was arrested and charged with speeding and resisting a police officer by flight on June 12, 2013, in Monroe, Louisiana.
