= Cullen Baker =

American outlaw and gang leader

Cullen Montgomery Baker
- Born: June 23, 1835; Weakley County, Tennessee
- Died: Bloomburg, Texas; January 1869
- Cause of death: Either drank poisoned whiskey or was killed by a mob led by Thomas Orr
- Resting place: Oakwood Cemetery, Jefferson, Texas
- Criminal charges: Murder, assault, theft
- Time at large: May 24, 1857 – January 1869

Cullen Montgomery Baker (June 23, 1835 – January 1869) was a Tennessee-born desperado whose gang terrorized Union soldiers and civilians in Northeast Texas, Southwest Arkansas, and Northwest Louisiana during the early days of the American Old West. His gang is alleged to have killed hundreds of people in the years following the American Civil War, though these numbers are probably inaccurate, and the actual number is between fifty and sixty.

Baker was notorious for his fiery temper and for fighting in saloon brawls. During one fight, he was knocked unconscious by a man named Morgan Culp, who hit him in the head with a tomahawk. This seemed to have shocked him into behaving, and it calmed his temper at least for a while. Baker has also been described as a gunfighter, though his preferred weapon was a double-barreled shotgun.

== Early life ==
Baker was born in Weakley County, Tennessee, a son of John Baker and his wife. Soon afterward his family moved to Clarksville, Arkansas, and as Cullen matured he spent much of his time in the saloons and bars of what are now Lafayette and Miller Counties. His father was an honest farmer and owned cattle as well as worked in the fields. Even when young, Cullen is said to have had a quick temper, which was further revealed as he got older, as he drank heavily and often.

On January 11, 1854, in Cass County, Texas, Baker married Martha Jane Petty, the daughter of Hubbard and Nancy Petty, and for a time he settled. However, eight months into his marriage, while out drinking with friends, he became involved in a verbal altercation with a youth named Stallcup. Baker became enraged, grabbed a whip, and beat the boy to near death. There were several witnesses to the incident, and Baker was soon charged with the crime. One of the witnesses, Wesley Bailey, was confronted by Baker at Bailey's home. Baker shot him in both legs with a shotgun, then left him lying in front of his house. Bailey died a few days later. Before he could be arrested for the murder, Baker fled to Arkansas, where he stayed with an uncle.

On May 24, 1857, Martha Jane Baker gave birth to a baby girl, Louisa Jane. On June 2, 1860, Martha Jane died. Cullen Baker then returned to Texas, where he left his daughter with his in-laws.

Baker returned to Arkansas, but word of his crimes had spread, and a local woman named Beth Warthom was openly critical of him. He took several hickory switches to her house and threatened to beat her. Her husband, David Warthom, began to fight with Baker and overwhelmed him in front of the house. Beth screamed, and as her husband looked her way, he was stabbed once with a knife Baker had in his possession. Warthom died on the spot. Baker fled back to Texas, and in July 1862, he married his second wife Martha Foster, who was unaware that he was wanted for murder. She was the daughter of William and Elizabeth Young Foster.

== American Civil War and after ==
Baker served with the Confederate Army during the American Civil War, joining shortly after his second marriage. It is claimed he shot and killed at least three African Americans, killing a black woman in an immigrant train and later shooting a black boy six times with a pistol after taking the Oath of Allegiance and becoming an overseer of Freemen. By 1864 he had either been discharged or deserted, and he joined a group called the "Independent Rangers", loosely associated with the Confederate Home Guard. It was intended to pursue and capture deserters from the Confederate Army, but more often than not took advantage of most of the men being away at war, leaving mostly elderly men, women and children. This left the door open for acts of intimidation, rape, theft and violence for groups of well-armed men like the "Independent Rangers". Shortly after Baker joined the "Independent Rangers" they began an ongoing feud with another band called the "Mountain Boomers", but by the end of that year the "Boomers" had been driven out or forced to disperse due to several of their members having been killed by the "Rangers".

In November 1864, Baker led a group of "Rangers" to intercept a band of Arkansas settlers, mostly older men, women and children, who had fled Perry County, Arkansas for a better life out west. Baker allegedly considered this "un-patriotic", but more likely than not his motives were simple robbery. The "Rangers" caught up with these fleeing settlers as they were crossing the Saline River somewhere in the Ouachita Mountains, but when the settlers refused to return Baker drew his pistol and shot and killed the group's leader. With assurances from Baker that he would not kill anyone else, the remaining settlers returned to Baker's side of the river, where he quickly led his "Rangers" in shooting and killing nine other men. The event became known locally as the "Massacre of Saline".

By that stage of the war the Union Army occupied most of Arkansas, with several troops under the command of Captain F. S. Dodge enforcing the law in the area of Lafayette County. Most of these Union troops were African American and despised by Baker. Toward the end of 1864 Baker was in a saloon in the small town of Spanish Bluff, Bowie County, Texas, when he was approached by four African-American Union soldiers and asked for identification. Baker turned to face them with his pistol drawn, shooting and killing one sergeant and the three other soldiers.

After the war ended, Baker organized a gang with outlaw Lee Rames, which operated out of the Sulphur River bottoms near Brightstar, Arkansas, committing acts of robbery and murder. Authorities credit Baker officially with killing at least 30 people, though many of these no doubt were killed by his fellow gang members. Unlike the romanticized versions of his exploits, the reality was that he killed most of his victims from ambush or from behind, many with a shotgun, and he almost always had his victims outnumbered. Like many of the ex-Confederates who became criminals after the war, Baker was regarded as a hero by some because he opposed the Federal occupation, but his record shows a merciless killer who killed anyone who angered him, regardless of their loyalties.

In March 1866, Baker traveled back to Texas. Now on the run from Union authorities, he went on a killing spree during which he killed two men, W. G. Kirkman and John Salmons. Salmons had previously killed one of Baker's gang members, Seth Rames, the brother of gang member Lee Rames. Baker also killed a local man named George W. Barron, who had previously taken part as a member of a posse hunting Baker. The gang was active in the areas of Queen City, Texas and Texarkana, Arkansas during this time.

On June 1, 1867, having returned to Cass County, Baker entered the Rowden general store where he found the store kept by Mrs. Rowden, after which he simply helped himself to whatever he wanted and left without paying. When the store's owner, John Rowden, discovered this he armed himself with a shotgun and rode out to Baker's house. He demanded that Baker pay him, to which Baker replied that he would come back to the store in a few days with the money. On June 5, 1867, Baker returned, but instead of paying his debt stood in front of the store yelling for Mr. Rowden to come out and face him. Rowden armed himself with a shotgun and stepped out only to be shot in the chest and killed by Baker. Baker fled back into Arkansas, and a few days later he was confronted by a U.S. Army sergeant and one private as he boarded a ferry. When he was accused of being Cullen Baker, after having told them his name was Johnson, Baker went for his gun, as did the sergeant. Baker shot the sergeant four times, killing him, with the private fleeing on horseback and reporting the murder to Captain Kirkham. Following this murder, Baker was pursued relentlessly by U.S. forces in the area.

While in New Boston, Texas, on July 25, 1867, Baker became involved in an argument with several U.S. Army soldiers. A shootout ensued and Baker was shot in the arm, though he killed Private Albert E. Titus of the U.S. 20th Infantry Regiment. This resulted in a $1,000 reward being placed on Baker for his capture or death.

He returned to Arkansas, and while in a saloon in Brightstar he agreed to join a mob intending to raid the farm of a local farmer named Howell Smith. Smith had hired several recently freed slaves, which was considered inappropriate by much of the local population. During the raid, one of Smith's daughters was stabbed and another clubbed, and a black man was shot and killed. Smith resisted and a shootout ensued, resulting in several mob members being wounded, including Baker being shot in the leg.

On October 24, 1868, Baker and his gang were reported to have been involved in the killings of Major P. J. Andrews, Lt. H. F. Willis, and an unnamed negro, as well as the wounding of Sheriff Standel of Little Rock, Arkansas.

== Death ==
Although Baker was feared by his own men, Lee Rames, who was recognized as the co-leader and co-founder of Baker's gang, also had a substantial and deadly reputation. Rames began to doubt Baker's leadership and believed that eventually Baker would lead the entire gang to its downfall. Rames defied Baker and Baker backed down, leading to the gang breaking up. All but one gang member, "Dummy" Kirby, sided with Rames.

Baker and Kirby rode to Bloomburg, Texas and the home of Baker's in-laws in January 1869. It was there that Cullen Baker and "Dummy" Kirby were killed. The exact circumstances of their deaths, however, remain unclear. There are at least two conflicting accounts:

- First version: Unknown to Baker, his wife Martha Foster's father and friends had laced a bottle of whiskey and some food with strychnine. Kirby and Baker drank and ate it, and both died from poisoning. Their bodies were then shot several times by Foster and some friends.
- Second version: A local schoolteacher named Thomas Orr had become involved romantically with Baker's second wife Martha, and led a small band of men who ambushed Baker and Kirby at the Foster home, shooting and killing them near the chimney of the house. It is known that a schoolteacher named Thomas Orr was a friend of the in-laws who took part in the killing of Baker; whether the story of the affair is true is unknown.

What both versions share is the outcome. Baker and Kirby were killed at the Foster home, with both shot numerous times, and then the bodies were dragged through the town of Bloomburg. The bodies were taken to the U.S. Army outpost near Jefferson, where they were placed on public display. Baker is buried in Oakwood Cemetery in Jefferson, Texas.

The town of Bloomburg, Texas continues to commemorate the event with the annual Cullen Baker Country Fair, held the first weekend in November. Proceeds benefit the Bloomburg City’s efforts to build a city park and revive tourism since the COVID-19 pandemic.

=== Possible eyewitness to Baker's death ===
A reference to Cullen (Col) Baker is made by former slave Doc Quinn in the Slave Narratives: a Folk History of Slavery in the United States - From Interviews with Former Slaves - Arkansas Narratives, Part 6. Doc Quinn provides a somewhat different perspective on Cullen Baker throughout. The statements of Doc Quinn are recorded as follows:

"He wuz mah frien' as long as he lib, and he wuz a good frien' ob de South 'cause he saved lots ob white folks frum de wrath ob de mean niggers." (sic)

Doc Quinn provides an account of Cullen Baker's death at which he claims to have been present:

"I saw Colonel Baker killed. We had just arrived at his father-in-law's house and I wuz in the horse lot, about 50 yards from de house, when Joe Davis. Thomas Orr and some more men rode up."

"De Colonel wuz standin' by de chimney an did not see dem come aroun' de house. Dey killed him befo' he knew dey wuz aroun'."

Whilst Doc Quinn refers to Cullen Baker as "Colonel" Baker, the text from which Doc Quinn is quoted has the following inclusion, presumably included by the editor of the publication to clarify any confusion: "Note: The Col. Baker referred to was Cullen Baker, the leader of a ruthless gang of bushwhackers that operated in this [Texarkana, Arkansas] section shortly after the Civil War."

Louis L'Amour, author of many western novels, wrote about Cullen Baker in several of his books. Baker only starred in one of these, however, that being The First Fast Draw, a highly fictionalized account of Baker's origin and subsequent years. Other books by L'Amour that reference Baker include Lando, one of L'Amour's many novels about a feuding Tennessee family. Baker was also the subject of the book Cullen Baker; Reconstruction Desperado, authored by Barry A. Crouch and Donally E. Brice.
