= Shanghai Pierce =

Shanghai Pierce may refer to:

- Mark Canterbury, American wrestler
- Abel Head "Shanghai" Pierce (1834–1900), Texas rancher and cattleman
