= Springdale, Texas =

- Unincorporated community
- Location within Texas Location within the United States
- Coordinates: 33°13′59″N 94°7′59.68″W
- Country: United States
- State: Texas
- County: Cass
- Elevation: 253 ft (77 m)
- Time zone: UTC-6 (Central (CST))
  - Summer (DST): UTC-5 (CDT)
- Area codes: 903 & 430
- GNIS feature ID: 1379103

Springdale is an unincorporated community in Cass County, Texas, United States. According to the Handbook of Texas, the community had a population of 55 in 2000.

== Geography ==
Springdale is located on Farm to Market Road 2327, 5 mi (8.0 km) northeast of Queen City, 9 mi (14 km) northeast of Atlanta, 24 mi (39 km) northeast of Linden, and 16 mi (26 km) southwest of Texarkana in northeastern Cass County.

== Education ==
Today, the community is served by the Queen City Independent School District.
