= Shepherd, Texas =

- City
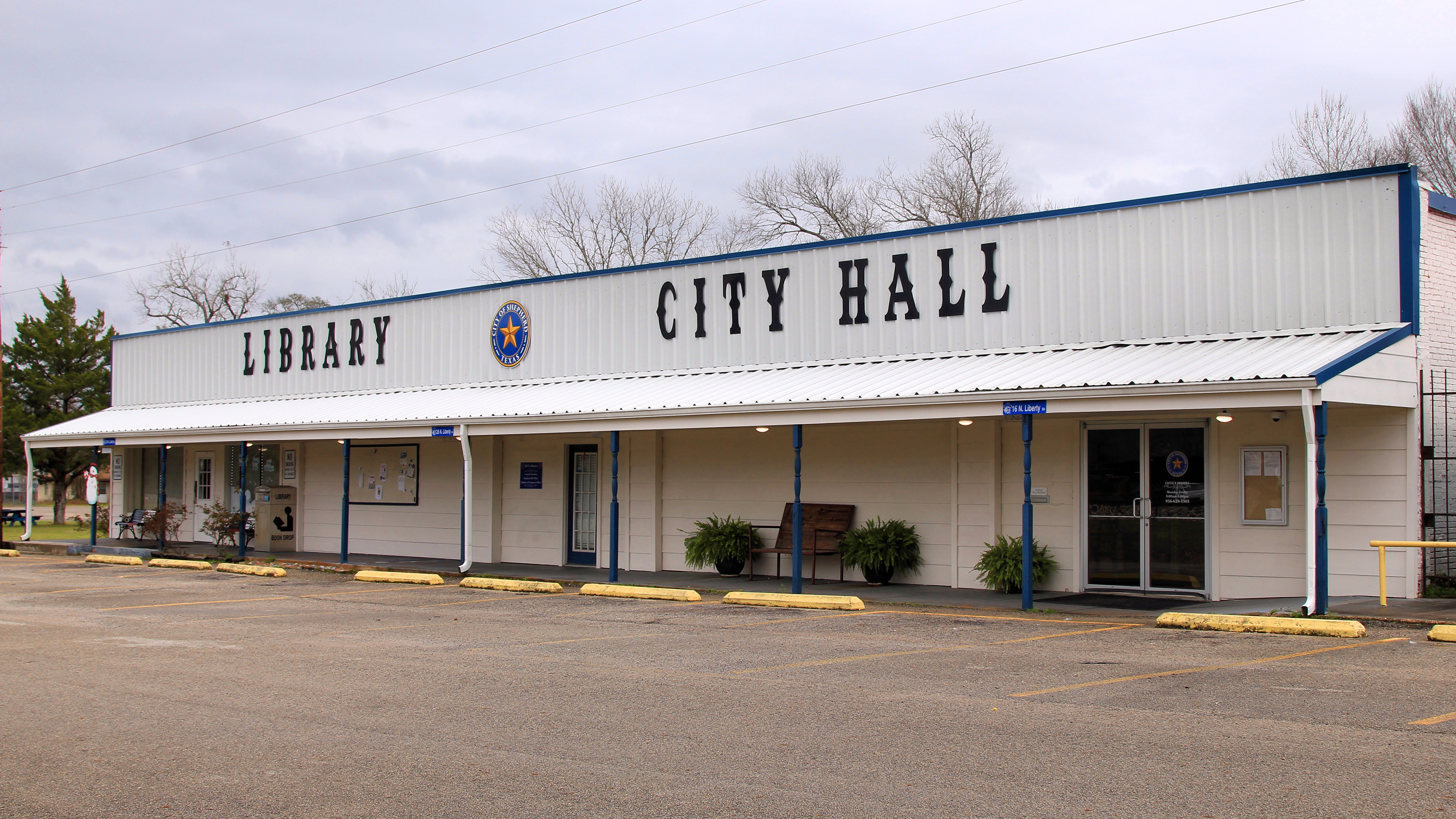
- Library and City Hall in Shepherd

- Location within San Jacinto County and Texas

- Location of Shepherd in the state of Texas Location of Shepherd in the United States
- Coordinates: 30°29′29″N 94°59′59″W
- Country: United States
- State: Texas
- County: San Jacinto

Area
  - Total: 6.12 sq mi (15.85 km^{2})
  - Land: 6.10 sq mi (15.79 km^{2})
  - Water: 0.023 sq mi (0.06 km^{2})
- Elevation: 144 ft (44 m)

Population (2020)
  - Total: 2,105
  - Density: 395.9/sq mi (152.84/km^{2})
- Time zone: UTC-6 (Central (CST))
  - Summer (DST): UTC-5 (CDT)
- ZIP code: 77371
- Area code: 936
- FIPS code: 48-67424
- GNIS feature ID: 1382753
- Website: www.shepherdtx.org

Shepherd is a city in San Jacinto County, Texas, United States. The population was 2,105 at the 2020 census.

== Historical information ==
Texas Historical Marker #7672, erected in 1970, located west of FM 222 on SH 150 in Shepherd, gives a brief background for the town. Exact text on the marker is as follows:

Originated in vicinity of Old Drew's Landing, a Trinity River port for settlers bringing in goods and shipping cotton, tobacco, and other products to markets. An early nearby community was Big Creek. Into these pioneer settlements came Houston East & West Texas Railroad investors, including Benjamin A. Shepherd (1814-1891) of Houston, who in 1875 platted townsite here, naming it for himself. The town square was on west side of H. E. & W. T., which was completed beyond this point in 1879. The Shepherd Post Office opened Dec. 22, 1879, with Jack B. Noble as postmaster. A pioneer physician was Dr. William Herbert Beazley (1837-1919); Mrs. Jessie Fain operated an early hotel; Mrs. Jane Langham taught first public-school session, in Methodist church building. James Ephraim Tribe, a native of Canada, came here in 1895, was a carpenter, coffin maker, millwright, and wheelwright. A Baptist, he built a church edifice for that faith in 1896. Distinguished native son Robert Scott Lovett (1860-1932), became president of Southern Pacific and Union Pacific railroads and rendered outstanding civilian service to the nation during World War I. Once a center for the lumbering industry, Shepherd remains an important market town of southeast Texas.

=== 2023 petroleum plant explosion ===
On November 8, 2023, a petroleum processing plant exploded in Shepherd. Shelter-in-place orders were issued within a five-mile (8.0 km) radius, which was later lowered to one mile (1.6 km). One employee was injured, with minor burns. US 59 was closed.

== Geography ==
Shepherd is located at 30°29′29″N 94°59′59″W (30.491363, –94.999595).

According to the United States Census Bureau, the city has a total area of 6.1 square miles (16 km^{2}), of which 6.1 square miles (16 km^{2}) is land and 0.16% is water.

Shepherd is located along US Route 59 which is planned to be upgraded to Interstate 69.

== Demographics ==
Historical population
Census	Pop.	Note	%±
1880	39		—
1970	1,037		—
1980	1,674		61.4%
1990	1,812		8.2%
2000	2,029		12.0%
2010	2,319		14.3%
2020	2,105		−9.2%
U.S. Decennial Census

=== 2020 census ===
As of the 2020 census, Shepherd had a population of 2,105. The median age was 37.7 years. 27.5% of residents were under the age of 18 and 16.1% of residents were 65 years of age or older. For every 100 females there were 94.0 males, and for every 100 females age 18 and over there were 88.9 males age 18 and over.

0.0% of residents lived in urban areas, while 100.0% lived in rural areas.

There were 741 households in Shepherd, of which 38.2% had children under the age of 18 living in them. Of all households, 43.6% were married-couple households, 19.6% were households with a male householder and no spouse or partner present, and 32.1% were households with a female householder and no spouse or partner present. About 25.3% of all households were made up of individuals and 12.0% had someone living alone who was 65 years of age or older.

There were 836 housing units, of which 11.4% were vacant. The homeowner vacancy rate was 2.2% and the rental vacancy rate was 8.6%.

Racial composition as of the 2020 census
Race	Number	Percent
White	1,417	67.3%
Black or African American	267	12.7%
American Indian and Alaska Native	11	0.5%
Asian	7	0.3%
Native Hawaiian and Other Pacific Islander	2	0.1%
Some other race	213	10.1%
Two or more races	188	8.9%
Hispanic or Latino (of any race)	386	18.3%

=== 2010 census ===
The population was 2,319 people in the 2010 United States census. Shepherd is the 642nd most populated city in the state of Texas out of 1,752 cities.

In 2010, the median household income of Shepherd residents was $27,131. Shepherd households made slightly more than Chilton households ($27,115) and Bedias households ($27,112) However, 25.7% of Shepherd residents live in poverty.

The median age for Shepherd residents was 36.3 years old.

=== 2000 census ===
In the 2000 census, there were a reported 744 households, and 520 families residing in the city. The population density was 331.8 inhabitants per square mile (128.1/km^{2}). There were 853 housing units at an average density of 139.5 per square mile (53.9/km^{2}). The racial makeup of the city was 76.44% White, 18.53% African American, 0.84% Native American, 0.74% Asian, 0.05% Pacific Islander, 1.58% from other races, and 1.82% from two or more races. Hispanic or Latino of any race were 5.52% of the population.

There were 744 households, out of which 34.5% had children under the age of 18 living with them, 51.2% were married couples living together, 15.1% had a female householder with no husband present, and 30.1% were non-families. 26.7% of all households were made up of individuals, and 14.0% had someone living alone who was 65 years of age or older. The average household size was 2.60 and the average family size was 3.17.

In the city, the population was spread out, with 27.9% under the age of 18, 8.3% from 18 to 24, 25.7% from 25 to 44, 20.8% from 45 to 64, and 17.2% who were 65 years of age or older. The median age was 37 years. For every 100 females, there were 87.0 males. For every 100 females age 18 and over, there were 83.6 males.

The median income for a household in the city was $28,906, and the median income for a family was $33,138. Males had a median income of $29,327 versus $19,615 for females. The per capita income for the city was $13,115. About 17.5% of families and 19.8% of the population were below the poverty line, including 24.5% of those under age 18 and 21.2% of those age 65 or over.

== Education ==
The City of Shepherd is served by the Shepherd Independent School District.

== Notable people ==
- Ernest Bailes, politician
- Amber Holcomb, American Idol season 12 finalist
- Tyler Kolek, Minor League Baseball pitcher
- Stephen Kolek, pitcher for the Kansas City Royals
- Bert Long Jr., artist
- Jonathan Marshall, American football defensive tackle
- Travian Smith, American football linebacker
