= Texas State Highway 93 =

State highway in Texas

State Highway 93
- SH 93 highlighted in red

Route information
- Maintained by TxDOT
- Length: 6.478 mi (10.425 km)
- Existed: August 31, 1967–present

Major junctions
- South end: I-369 / US 59 / Loop 151 in Texarkana
- US 67 in Texarkana; US 82 in Texarkana
- North end: I-30 / US 59 in Texarkana

Location
- Country: United States
- State: Texas

Highway system
- Highways in Texas; Interstate; US; State; Former; Toll; Loops; Spurs; FM/RM; Park; Rec
← SH 92	→ SH 94

State Highway 93 (SH 93) is a numbered state highway in Texas. It covers a total of 6.478 miles (10.425 km), entirely within the city limits of Texarkana. This route was designated on August 31, 1967, when Summerhill Road was extended along the former Chance Street to an intersection with New Boston Road (U.S. Highway 82). It went from I‑30 to US 67 at the time. The route was extended along Lucas Street on February 7, 1985 to connect with Lake Drive at 10th Street, replacing a portion of Loop 151.

== Route description ==
SH 93 includes the portion of Summerhill Road south of Interstate 30. It crosses New Boston Road, Martin Luther King Boulevard (westbound U.S. Highway 67), and 7th Street (eastbound US 67), after which it becomes Lake Drive. From there it forms a curve to the southwest and west, finally ending at Loop 151, and feeding into Interstate 369/U.S. Highway 59.

== History ==
Historic SH 93

Historic SH 93

The original SH 93 was designated on January 21, 1924, as the route from Gatesville to the "state reformatory school", which was the state juvenile training and rehabilitation school for boys, a few miles north. On July 25, 1933, this route became a portion of SH 36, but this did not take effect until SH 36 was under construction in the area. On December 22, 1937, the section of SH 97 from Jourdanton to Fowlerton was renumbered to a new SH 93 on December 22, 1937, but this was reverted by April 1, 1938 so this SH 93 was transferred back to SH 97 (signage did not change until June or later).

== Junction list ==
The entire route is in Texarkana, Bowie County.

mi	km	Destinations	Notes
0.0	0.0	I-369 north / US 59 / Loop 151 east	Southern terminus; current southern terminus and exit 111A on I-369; western terminus of Loop 151
3.5	5.6	US 67 north (7th Street)	One-way street
3.6	5.8	US 67 south (Martin Luther King Jr. Boulevard)	One-way street
4.4	7.1	US 82 (New Boston Road)	
4.8	7.7	FM 559 north (Richmond Road)	Southern terminus of FM 559
6.5	10.5	I-30 / US 59 – Dallas, Little Rock	Northern terminus; exit 222 on I-30
1.000 mi = 1.609 km; 1.000 km = 0.621 mi
