= Pierce, Texas =

- Unincorporated community
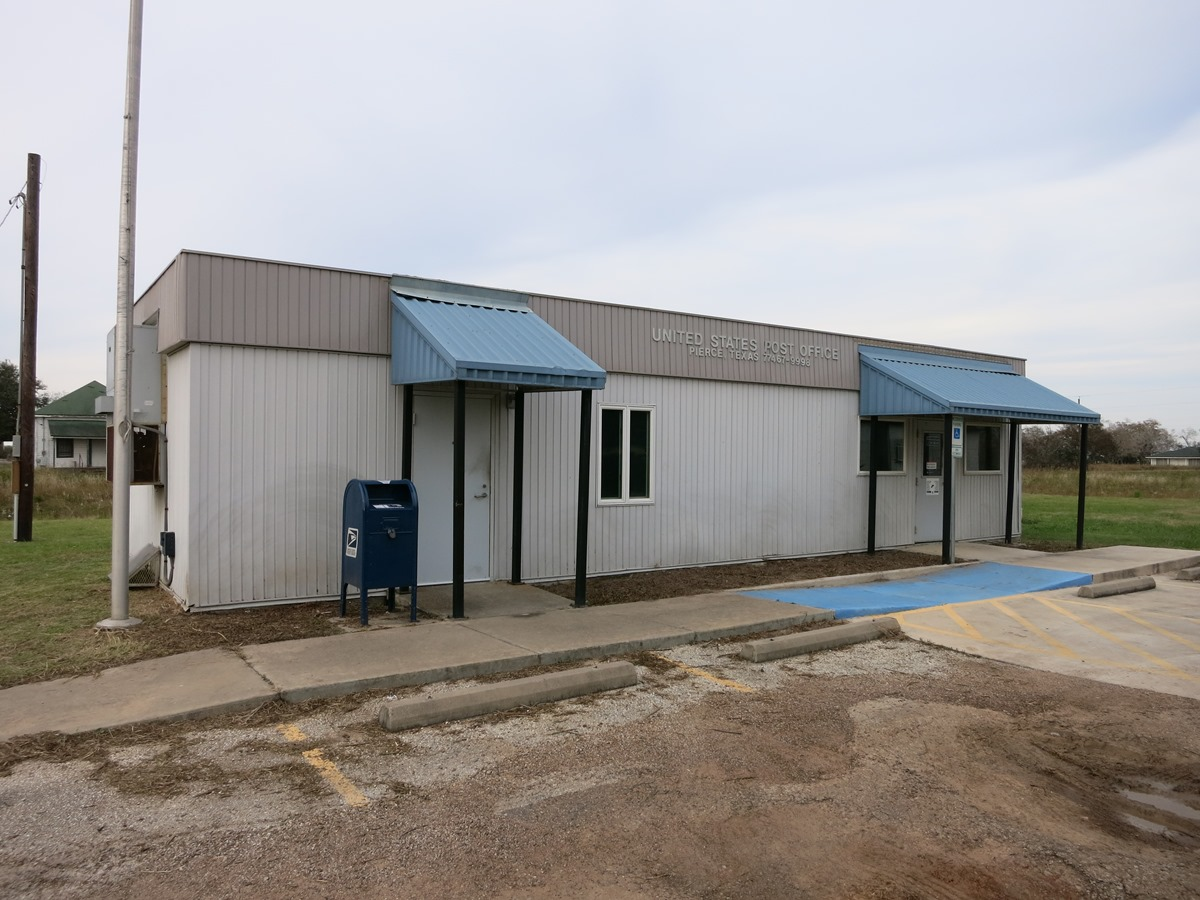
- Post office

- Location within the state of Texas Pierce, Texas (the United States)
- Coordinates: 29°14′21″N 96°12′00″W
- Country: United States
- State: Texas
- County: Wharton
- Elevation: 98 ft (30 m)
- Time zone: UTC-6 (Central (CST))
  - Summer (DST): UTC-5 (CDT)
- ZIP code: 77467
- Area code: 979
- GNIS: 1365193

Pierce is an unincorporated community in Wharton County, Texas, United States. According to the Handbook of Texas, Pierce had an estimated population of 49 in 2000. It is located within the Greater Houston metropolitan area.

== History ==
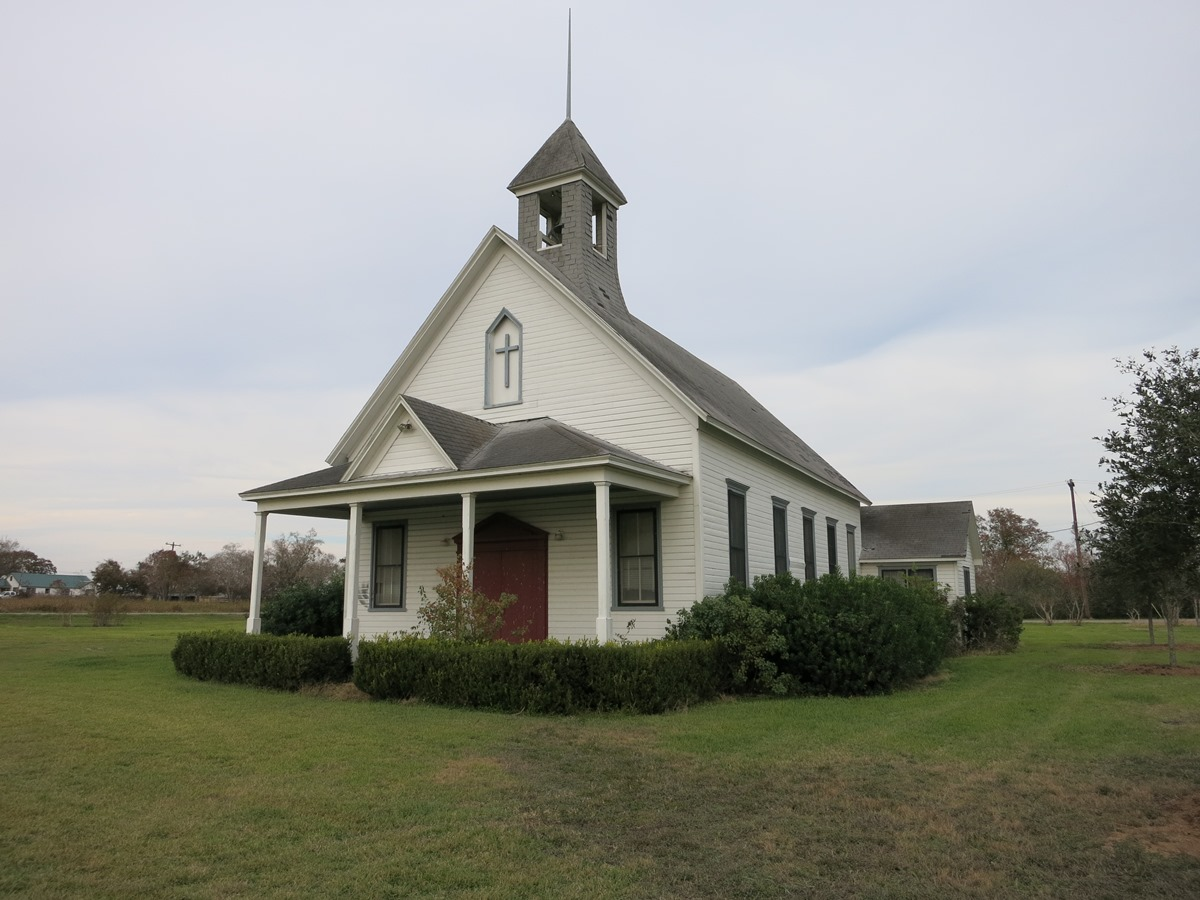
Church in Pierce

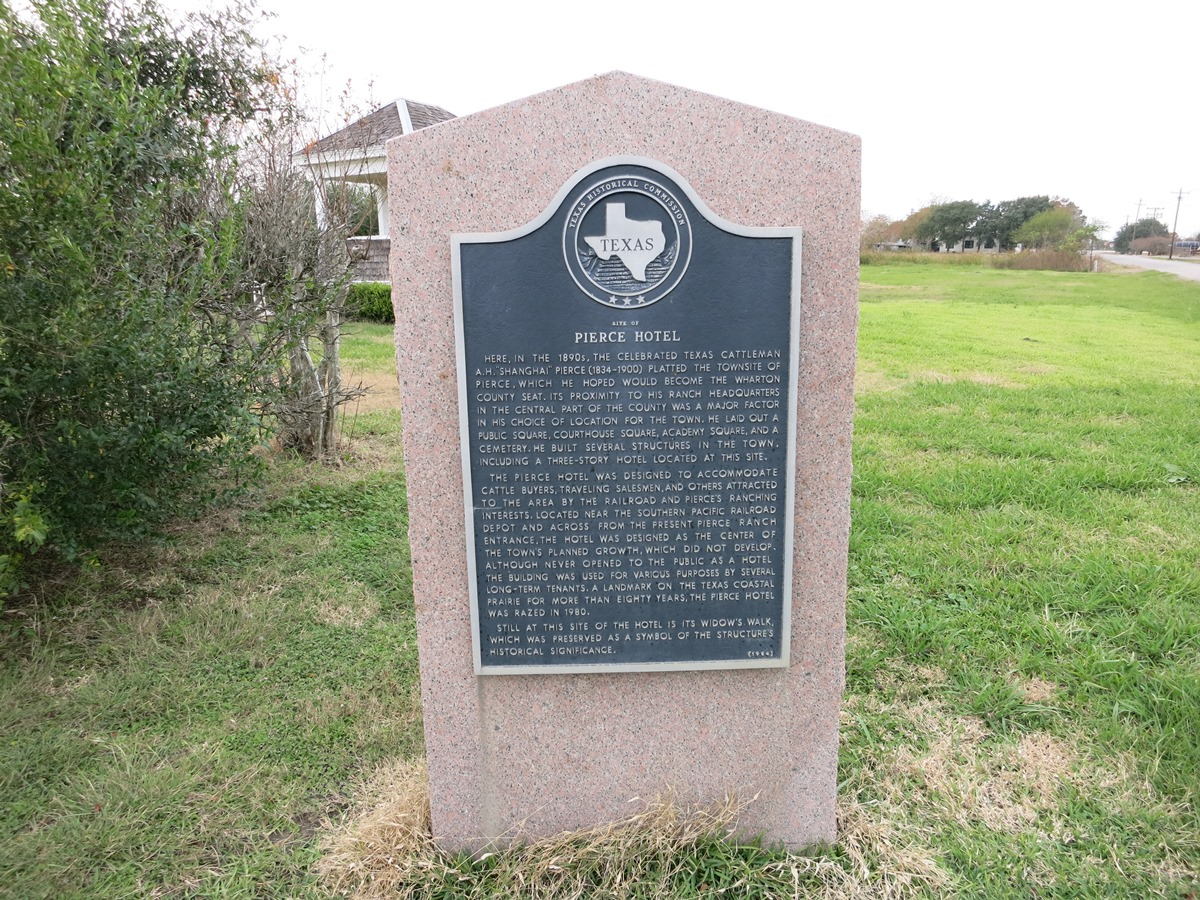
Historic marker at site of a former hotel

The community was originally called Pierce's Station in 1881. The New York, Texas and Mexican Railway built a track 91 mi (146 km) long. It traveled from Richmond to Victoria across the upper section of Abel Head "Shanghai" Pierce's land. He gave the railroad permission to build if he could choose where to build depots to load cattle. Despite the railroad building one near his home, Pierce then built one himself, at his expense. Since it was located close to the geographic center of Wharton County, he encouraged residents to make Pierce the county seat. In March 1894, 160 acres (65 ha) of land was divided into 64 240 square feet (2.2×10^{−5} km^{2}) blocks for the townsite. When the streets were donated to the public, a courthouse, a park, and a cemetery were built on top of them. A post office was established in 1886 and the community's name was changed to Pierce in 1895. Forty people were living in Pierce in 1890. Shanghai Pierce wanted another railroad track to be built from Eagle Lake to Bay City, which would be on the west side of the Colorado River and would travel through the community to make it a crossroads community, but it did not happen. He also built a three-story hotel, but it also failed. It was eventually knocked down in 1980. Pierce then built a church and some houses for the people who worked for him. There were six livestock brokers, several stores, a gin, and 50 people living in Pierce in 1892. From 1914 to 1926, the population grew to 100 and Shanghai's nephew, A.P. Borden, was the "mayor" of the community. The population further rose to 150 in the 1940s and the community had five businesses. The majority of the homes in the community were gone by 1980. The population declined from 125 in 1967 to 49 two years later. It also had one business that year. The Texas Department of Public Safety and the Wharton County Youth Fair were housed in Pierce for a short time with Precinct No. 4 serving as the county commissioner's headquarters. A grocery store, post office, and church were located here, with the population remaining at 49 from 1990 through 2000.

In June 1921, Pierce was struck by a Category 1 hurricane.

Shanghai Pierce's ranch house in the community is listed on the National Register of Historic Places.

== Geography ==
Pierce is located on U.S. Route 59, 5 mi (8.0 km) northeast of El Campo and 8 mi (13 km) west of Wharton in central Wharton County. It is also on Texas State Highway 71.

=== Climate ===
The climate in this area is characterized by hot, humid summers and generally mild to cool winters. According to the Köppen Climate Classification system, Pierce has a humid subtropical climate, abbreviated "Cfa" on climate maps.

== Education ==
The first school in Pierce was built in March 1894. A school district was established in 1921 and a campus was built with bricks. The Pierce Ranch financed its construction. In 1953, the school joined the Wharton ISD.

Public education in the community of Pierce is provided by the El Campo Independent School District and Wharton Independent School District.
