= Bloomburg High School =

Location
- 307 West Cypress Street; Bloomburg, Texas 75556; United States; 33.135333°N 94.062294°W

Information
- School type: Public high school
- School district: Bloomburg Independent School District
- Principal: Ryan Stanley
- Teaching staff: 25.57 (FTE)
- Grades: 6-12
- Enrollment: 243 (2023–2024)
- Student to teacher ratio: 9.50
- Colors: Blue & Gold
- Athletics conference: UIL Class A
- Mascot: Wildcat
- Website: Bloomburg High School

Bloomburg High School is a public high school located in the city of Bloomburg, Texas (USA). It is classified as a 1A school by the UIL. It is a part of the Bloomburg Independent School District located in eastern Cass County, near the Texas-Louisiana border. For the 2021-2022 school year, the school was given an "A" by the Texas Education Agency.

== Athletics ==
The Bloomburg Wildcats compete in the following sports:

- Basketball
- Cross Country
- Golf
- Softball
- Tennis
- Track and Field
