= Tyler Kolek (baseball) =

American baseball player (born 1995)

- Pitcher
- Born: December 15, 1995 (age 30); Shepherd, Texas, U.S.
- Bats: Right Throws: Right
- Stats at Baseball Reference

Tyler Frank Kolek (born December 15, 1995) is an American former professional baseball pitcher. He was drafted by the Miami Marlins with the second overall pick of the 2014 Major League Baseball draft.

== High school career ==
Kolek attended Shepherd High School in Shepherd, Texas, and played for the school's baseball team. He missed most of his junior season, after breaking his arm in a collision with a baserunner. He signed a letter-of-intent with Texas Christian University in November 2013. Throughout the first three starts of his senior year, he had not given up a hit and had 35 strikeouts over 15 innings.

== Professional career ==
With a fastball that had been clocked as high as 102 miles per hour (164 km/h), Kolek was considered to be among the top high school pitching prospects for the 2014 Major League Baseball draft. The Miami Marlins selected Kolek in the first round, second overall, of the draft. He signed on June 16 and was assigned to the Gulf Coast League Marlins, where he posted a 0-3 record with a 4.50 ERA in nine games. He spent 2015 with the Greensboro Grasshoppers where he went 4-10 with a 4.56 ERA, with a 1.56 WHIP in 25 games. On April 7, 2016, Kolek underwent Tommy John surgery, and had to sit out during the 2016 season. Kolek missed a majority of the 2017 season as well due to injury; he pitched in only three games for the GCL Marlins in which he gave up 12 earned runs in 3 2/3 innings.

Kolek spent the 2018 season split between the Low-A Batavia Muckdogs and the GCL Marlins, where he pitched to a 6.32 ERA in 10 appearances for the affiliates. He split 2019 between the Single-A Clinton LumberKings and Batavia, registering a 9.22 ERA in 15 games. Kolek did not play in a game in 2020 due to the cancellation of the minor league season because of the COVID-19 pandemic. On November 2, 2020, Kolek elected free agency.

Being inactive in 2021 and having failed to advance past Single–A which is three levels below the major leagues, he will become the fifth player to be drafted #2 overall in the first year player draft, and the first since 1987, to fail to reach the major leagues before retiring should he not resume his baseball career. In addition, the #1 overall pick Brady Aiken was also inactive in 2021, and also having failed to advance past Single–A. This will mark the first major league baseball draft in which both the first and second overall selections failed to reach the major leagues, Triple-A, or Double-A.

== Personal life ==
Kolek's brother, Stephen, also played for Shepherd's baseball team, and played college baseball for Texas A&M University. He was drafted in the 11th round of the 2018 MLB draft by the Los Angeles Dodgers, and is currently a pitcher for the Kansas City Royals.
