= Queen City High School =

Location
- 905 Houston Street; Queen City, Texas 75572; United States; 33.15002°N 94.13754°W

Information
- School type: Public high school
- Motto: Bulldog Pride Never Dies
- School district: Queen City Independent School District
- Principal: Janice McMellon
- Teaching staff: 32.89 (FTE)
- Grades: 9-12
- Enrollment: 292 (2023–2024)
- Student to teacher ratio: 8.88
- Colors: Orange & Black
- Athletics conference: UIL Class 3A
- Mascot: Bulldog/Lady Bulldog
- Website: Queen City High School

Queen City High School is a public high school located in the city of Queen City, Texas, United States. It is classified as a 3A school by the University Interscholastic League (UIL). It is part of the Queen City Independent School District located in northeast Cass County bordering Atlanta, Texas to the south. For the 2021-2022 school year, the school was given an "A" by the Texas Education Agency.

It serves Queen City, Domino, and a portion of Atlanta.

== Athletics ==
The Athletics Director of Queen City High School is David Wilbanks, and he was hired in April 2024. He is also the head football coach. The head coach for the school's baseball program is Tyler Wilbanks. The head coach for the boys' basketball team is Brandon Garner, and the girl's position is currently vacant.

Queen City High School competes in the following sports:

- Baseball
- Basketball
- Cross Country
- Football
- Golf
- Powerlifting
- Softball
- Tennis
- Track and Field
- Volleyball
- Archery

=== Retired Numbers ===
- Ty Ball, 75 (posthumously awarded)

Jason Peters,71 (being a badass)

=== State Titles ===
- Baseball -
  - 1992(3A)

=== Notable alumni ===
- Jason Peters, NFL Offensive Lineman for the Buffalo Bills, Philadelphia Eagles, and Chicago Bears. Class of 2000

== Band ==
- UIL Marching Band State Champions
  - 2007(2A), 2009(2A), 2011(2A)
- UIL Marching Band State Medalists
  - 2005(2A), 2013(2A), 2019(3A), 2021(3A)

From around 2001 to 2011, the band was under the direction of Chris Brannan. From 2012 forward, under the direction of Billy Vess. The band has 9 consecutive state and state finals appearances, starting in 2024. The staff includes Billy Vess, Kim Madlock, Tyler Cook, Amanda Cabe. The band was awarded as the 2020 UIL Honor Band runner-up.

Shows
Year	Show Title	State Placement
(2A) 2005	"Jekyll & Hyde"	2nd
2006	"The Music of Bill Chase"	No contest
2007	"The Journeys of Jules Verne"	1st
2008	"The Music of Cirque du Soleil"	No contest
2009	"The Lost City of Atlantis"	1st
2010	"The Tales of Arabia"	No contest
2011	"Bermuda Triangle"	1st
2012	"The Legend of Onarpos"	No contest
2013	"Optical Illusion"	3rd
2014	"My Immortal"	No contest
(3A) 2015	"Rise"	4th
2016	"Kaleidoscope"	No contest
2017	"Dream"	4th
2018	"Mediterranean Sketches"	No contest
2019	"Royalty"	3rd
2020	"Better Together"	No contest
2021	"Vikings"	3rd
2022	"To the Stars"	No contest
2023	"Fallout"	12th
2024	"Thorned"	17th
