= Shepherd Independent School District =

School district in Texas, United States

Address
- 1401 South Byrd Avenue Shepherd, Texas, 77371; United States

District information
- Type: Public
- Grades: PK–12
- Schools: 4
- NCES District ID: 4840020

Students and staff
- Students: 1,958 (2023–2024)
- Teachers: 122.86 (on an FTE basis) (2023–2024)
- Staff: 159.07 (on an FTE basis) (2023–2024)
- Student–teacher ratio: 15.94 (2023–2024)

Other information
- Website: www.shepherdisd.net

Shepherd Independent School District is a public school district based in Shepherd, Texas (USA).

In 2009, the school district was rated "academically acceptable" by the Texas Education Agency.

In 2019 the Texas Education Agency announced it would take control of the district, vacating the elected board.

== Schools ==
- Shepherd High (Grades 9–12)
- Shepherd Middle (Grades 6–8)
- Shepherd Intermediate (Grades 3–5)
- Shepherd Primary (Grades PK-2)
