= Bloomburg Independent School District =

School district in Texas

Coordinates: 33°08′08″N 94°03′38″W

Location
- Bloomburg, Texas ESC Region 8 USA

District information
- Type: Independent school district
- Grades: Pre-K through 12
- Superintendent: Brian Stroman
- Schools: 2 (2009-10)
- NCES District ID: 4810440

Students and staff
- Students: 267 (2010-11)
- Teachers: 26.10 (2009-10) (on full-time equivalent (FTE) basis)
- Student–teacher ratio: 10.80 (2009-10)
- Athletic conference: UIL Class 1A
- District mascot: Wildcats
- Colors: Blue, Gold

Other information
- TEA District Accountability Rating for 2011-12: Recognized
- Website: Bloomburg ISD

Bloomburg Independent School District is a public school district based in Bloomburg, Texas (USA). The district operates one high school, Bloomburg High School.

== Finances ==
As of the 2010–2011 school year, the appraised valuation of property in the district was $34,686,000. The maintenance tax rate was $0.117 and the bond tax rate was $0.000 per $100 of appraised valuation.

== Academic achievement ==
In 2011, the school district was rated "recognized" by the Texas Education Agency. Thirty-five percent of districts in Texas in 2011 received the same rating. No state accountability ratings will be given to districts in 2012. A school district in Texas can receive one of four possible rankings from the Texas Education Agency: Exemplary (the highest possible ranking), Recognized, Academically Acceptable, and Academically Unacceptable (the lowest possible ranking).

Historical district TEA accountability ratings

- 2011: Recognized
- 2010: Recognized
- 2009: Recognized
- 2008: Academically Acceptable
- 2007: Academically Acceptable
- 2006: Academically Acceptable
- 2005: Academically Acceptable
- 2004: Academically Acceptable

== Schools ==
In the 2011–2012 school year, the district operated two campuses.

- Bloomburg High School (Grades 6-12)
- Bloomburg Elementary (Grades PK-5)

== See also ==
- List of school districts in Texas
- List of high schools in Texas
