= Bloomburg, Texas =

- Town
- Interactive map of Bloomburg, Texas
- Coordinates: 33°08′16″N 94°03′33″W
- Country: United States
- State: Texas
- County: Cass

Area
  - Total: 1.01 sq mi (2.61 km^{2})
  - Land: 1.01 sq mi (2.61 km^{2})
  - Water: 0 sq mi (0.00 km^{2})
- Elevation: 308 ft (94 m)

Population (2020)
  - Total: 321
  - Density: 319/sq mi (123/km^{2})
- Time zone: UTC-6 (Central (CST))
  - Summer (DST): UTC-5 (CDT)
- ZIP code: 75556
- Area codes: 903, 430
- FIPS code: 48-08752
- GNIS feature ID: 2411698

Bloomburg is a town in Cass County, Texas, United States. Bloomburg is 7 miles (11 km) east of Atlanta, and is home to the Cullen Baker Country Fair, held every year on the first Saturday in November. Despite it being named after an outlaw named Cullen Baker, it is a huge family event and has a parade, craft/food booths, a pageant, bouncy houses, and a rodeo. According to the 2020 U.S. census, Bloomburg had a population of 321.

== Geography ==
Bloomburg is located in eastern Cass County.

According to the United States Census Bureau, the town has a total area of 1.0 square mile (2.6 km^{2}), all land, with the eastern city limits within one-half mile of the Arkansas state line.

== Demographics ==
Historical population
Census	Pop.	Note	%±
1920	436		—
1930	433		−0.7%
1940	471		8.8%
1950	477		1.3%
1960	383		−19.7%
1970	231		−39.7%
1980	419		81.4%
1990	376		−10.3%
2000	375		−0.3%
2010	404		7.7%
2020	321		−20.5%
U.S. Decennial Census

Bloomburg racial composition as of 2020 (NH = Non-Hispanic) (Note: Note: the US Census treats Hispanic/Latino as an ethnic category. This table excludes Latinos from the racial categories and assigns them to a separate category. Hispanics/Latinos can be of any race.)
Race	Number	Percentage
White (NH)	268	83.49%
Black or African American (NH)	30	9.35%
Native American or Alaska Native (NH)	4	1.25%
Asian (NH)	1	0.31%
Mixed/Multi-Racial (NH)	5	1.56%
Hispanic or Latino	13	4.05%
Total	321	

As of the 2020 United States census, there were 321 people, 169 households, and 107 families residing in the town.

As of the census of 2000, there were 375 people, 155 households, and 104 families residing in the town. The population density was 372.6 inhabitants per square mile (143.9/km^{2}). There were 177 housing units at an average density of 175.9 per square mile (67.9/km^{2}). The racial makeup of the town was 80.27% White, 17.60% African American, 0.80% Pacific Islander, 1.33% from other races. Hispanic or Latino of any race were 2.13% of the population.

There were 155 households, out of which 29.7% had children under the age of 18 living with them, 49.0% were married couples living together, 14.8% had a female householder with no husband present, and 32.9% were non-families. 30.3% of all households were made up of individuals, and 15.5% had someone living alone who was 65 years of age or older. The average household size was 2.42 and the average family size was 2.98.

In the town, the population was spread out, with 26.4% under the age of 18, 8.5% from 18 to 24, 24.5% from 25 to 44, 26.1% from 45 to 64, and 14.4% who were 65 years of age or older. The median age was 36 years. For every 100 females, there were 78.6 males. For every 100 females age 18 and over, there were 79.2 males.

The median income for a household in the town was $27,708, and the median income for a family was $34,875. Males had a median income of $26,364 versus $30,208 for females. The per capita income for the town was $18,799. About 13.0% of families and 17.9% of the population were below the poverty line, including 18.3% of those under age 18 and 20.6% of those age 65 or over.

== Education ==
Bloomburg is served by the Bloomburg Independent School District which operates two schools – Bloomburg High School (grades 6–12) and Bloomburg Elementary (grades PK–5).

== Notable person ==
- Thelma Mothershed-Wair, member of the Little Rock Nine
