= Domino, Texas =

- Town
- Nickname: The beer town of North East Texas
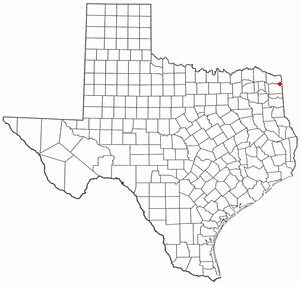
- Location of Domino, Texas

- Coordinates: 33°15′6″N 94°6′54″W
- Country: United States
- State: Texas
- County: Cass

Area
  - Total: 0.45 sq mi (1.17 km^{2})
  - Land: 0.45 sq mi (1.17 km^{2})
  - Water: 0 sq mi (0.00 km^{2})
- Elevation: 249 ft (76 m)

Population (2020)
  - Total: 71
  - Density: 196.8/sq mi (75.99/km^{2})
- Time zone: UTC-6 (Central (CST))
  - Summer (DST): UTC-5 (CDT)
- ZIP code: 75572
- Area codes: 903,430
- FIPS code: 48-20848
- GNIS feature ID: 2412440

Domino is a town in Cass County, Texas, United States. The population was 93 at the 2010 census, up from 52 at the 2000 census; in 2020, its population was 71. Domino is the only town in Cass County that is wet.

== Geography ==
Domino is located in northeastern Cass County 11 miles (18 km) north of Atlanta, Texas, and 17 miles (27 km) south of Texarkana. According to the United States Census Bureau, the town of Domino has a total area of 0.46 square miles (1.2 km^{2}), all land.

== Demographics ==
Historical population
| Census | Pop. | Note | %± |
|---|---|---|---|
| 1980 | 249 | | — |
| 1990 | 101 | | −59.4% |
| 2000 | 52 | | −48.5% |
| 2010 | 93 | | 78.8% |
| 2020 | 71 | | −23.7% |
U.S. Decennial Census

=== Racial and ethnic composition ===
Domino town, Texas – Racial and ethnic composition Note: the US Census treats Hispanic/Latino as an ethnic category. This table excludes Latinos from the racial categories and assigns them to a separate category. Hispanics/Latinos may be of any race.
| Race / Ethnicity (NH = Non-Hispanic) | Pop 2000 | Pop 2010 | Pop 2020 | % 2000 | % 2010 | % 2020 |
|---|---|---|---|---|---|---|
| White alone (NH) | 19 | 31 | 5 | 36.54% | 33.33% | 7.04% |
| Black or African American alone (NH) | 33 | 61 | 59 | 63.46% | 65.59% | 83.10% |
| Native American or Alaska Native alone (NH) | 0 | 0 | 1 | 0.00% | 0.00% | 1.41% |
| Asian alone (NH) | 0 | 0 | 0 | 0.00% | 0.00% | 0.00% |
| Native Hawaiian or Pacific Islander alone (NH) | 0 | 0 | 0 | 0.00% | 0.00% | 0.00% |
| Other race alone (NH) | 0 | 0 | 0 | 0.00% | 0.00% | 0.00% |
| Mixed race or Multiracial (NH) | 0 | 0 | 4 | 0.00% | 0.00% | 5.63% |
| Hispanic or Latino (any race) | 0 | 1 | 2 | 0.00% | 1.08% | 2.82% |
| Total | 52 | 93 | 71 | 100.00% | 100.00% | 100.00% |

=== 2020 census ===
As of the 2020 United States census, there were 71 people, 24 households, and 4 families residing in the town.

As of the census of 2000, there were 52 people, 19 households, and 14 families residing in the town. The population density was 151.4 inhabitants per square mile (58.5/km^{2}). There were 20 housing units at an average density of 58.2 per square mile (22.5/km^{2}). The racial makeup of the town was 36.54% White and 63.46% African American.

There were 19 households, out of which 26.3% had children under the age of 18 living with them, 47.4% were married couples living together, 26.3% had a female householder with no husband present, and 21.1% were non-families. 15.8% of all households were made up of individuals, and 10.5% had someone living alone who was 65 years of age or older. The average household size was 2.74 and the average family size was 3.07.

In the town, the population was spread out, with 21.2% under the age of 18, 5.8% from 18 to 24, 21.2% from 25 to 44, 42.3% from 45 to 64, and 9.6% who were 65 years of age or older. The median age was 46 years. For every 100 females, there were 100.0 males. For every 100 females age 18 and over, there were 78.3 males.

The median income for a household in the town was $31,250, and the median income for a family was $33,125. Males had a median income of $37,083 versus $21,429 for females. The per capita income for the town was $11,795. There were 11.8% of families and 16.1% of the population living below the poverty line, including 16.7% of under eighteens and 22.2% of those over 64.

== Education ==
Domino is served by the Queen City Independent School District, including Queen City High School.
