= Cordele, Texas =

Cordele
- Town
- Location in Texas Location in the United States
- Coordinates: 29°08′06″N 96°37′48″W
- Country: United States
- State: Texas
- County: Jackson
- Founded: 1897

Cordele (/kɔːrˈdɛl/ kor-DEL) is a town in Jackson County, Texas, United States. It was founded when land was sold from the New York and Texas Land Company to settlers in 1897. The name is derived from Cordele, Georgia. The first postmaster, Dr. Stapleton, hailed from Cordele, Georgia and named this area to remind him of home. The town was a shipping center at first, even with a post office. There were originally only eight residents.

The population reached 176 residents in 1968. The population has declined to 51 in 2000.

This town is usually coupled with the town of Edna, 13.2 miles away. Lake Texana is a few miles away, and attracts fisherman from around the state and people looking for recreation on the water or to camp on the water's edge.
