= Jefferson Historic District (Jefferson, Texas) =

Historic district in Texas, United States

- U.S. National Register of Historic Places
- U.S. Historic district
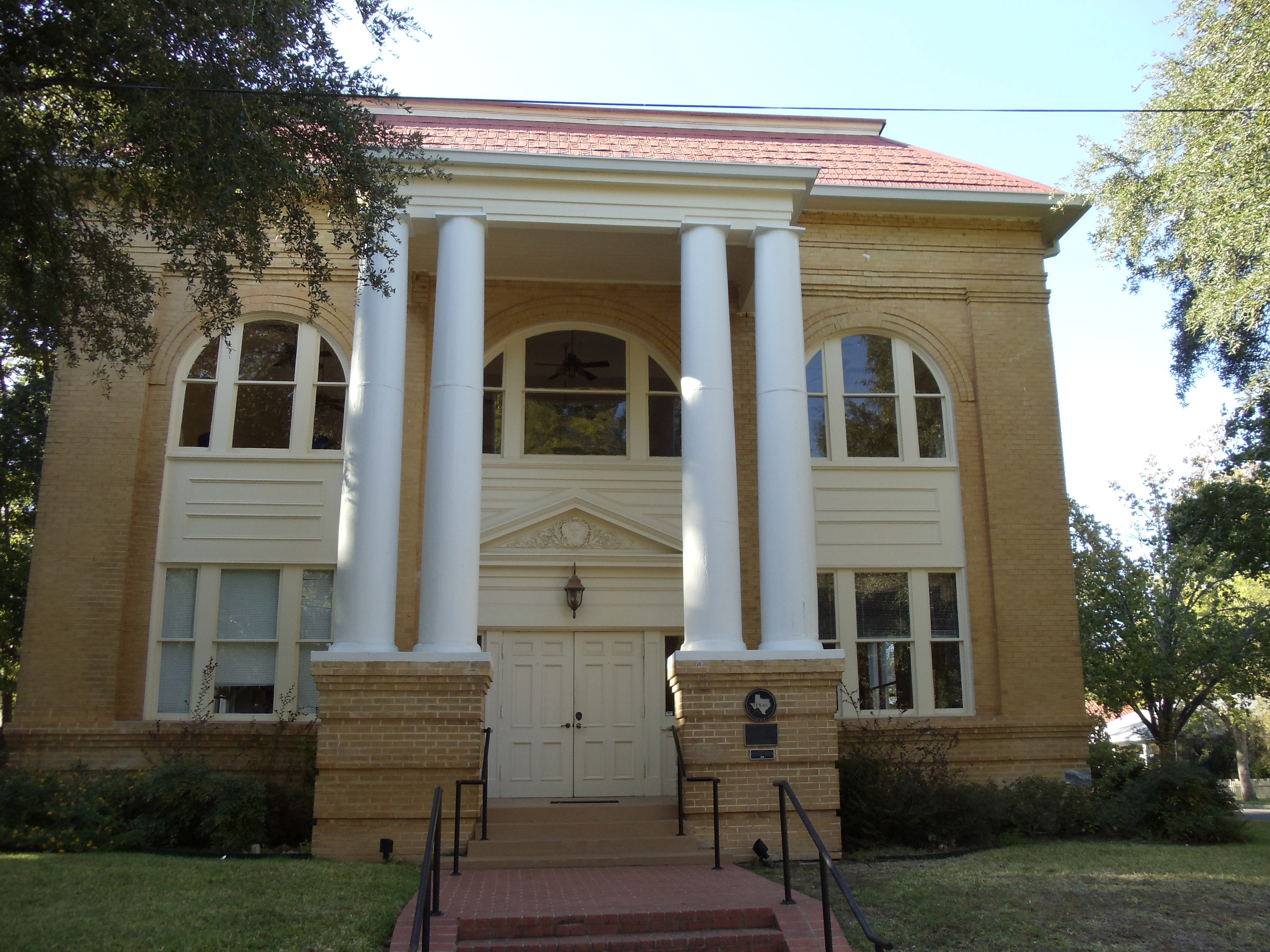
- Jefferson Carnegie Library

- Location within Texas Location within the United States

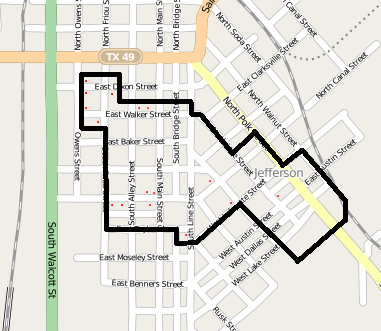
- Location of Jefferson Historic District in Jefferson, Texas
- Location: Roughly bounded by Owens, Dixon, Walnut, Camp, and Taylor Sts., Jefferson, Texas
- Coordinates: 32°45′37″N 94°21′3.25″W
- Area: 107 acres (43 ha)
- Architect: Multiple
- Architectural style: Italianate, Romanesque, Victorian
- NRHP reference No.: 71000949
- Added to NRHP: March 31, 1971

The Jefferson Historic District in the town of Jefferson, Marion County, Texas is a collection of numerous historic buildings including 56 of state significance at the time of its nomination. The district encompasses 107 acres of the southeastern portion of central Jefferson, and was added to the National Register of Historic Places on March 31, 1971. The district contains numerous Recorded Texas Historic Landmarks including the Marion County Courthouse that is also a State Antiquities Landmark. Many buildings are also documented in the Historic American Buildings Survey.

== Contributing properties ==
Listed below are some noteworthy contributing properties located within the district.

- Atkins House
- Rowell-DeWare Home
- Sagamore
- Marsh Place
- Guardian Oak (Lester House)
- Knightwood
- Falling Leaves (Koontz-Amoss Home)
- Todd-Terhune Residence
- Alice Emmert House
- Figures House
- Presbyterian Church
- Schluter Home
- Brown Building
- Jefferson Public Library - A Carnegie library built in 1907
- Kahn Saloon
- Thurman Place

== Gallery ==
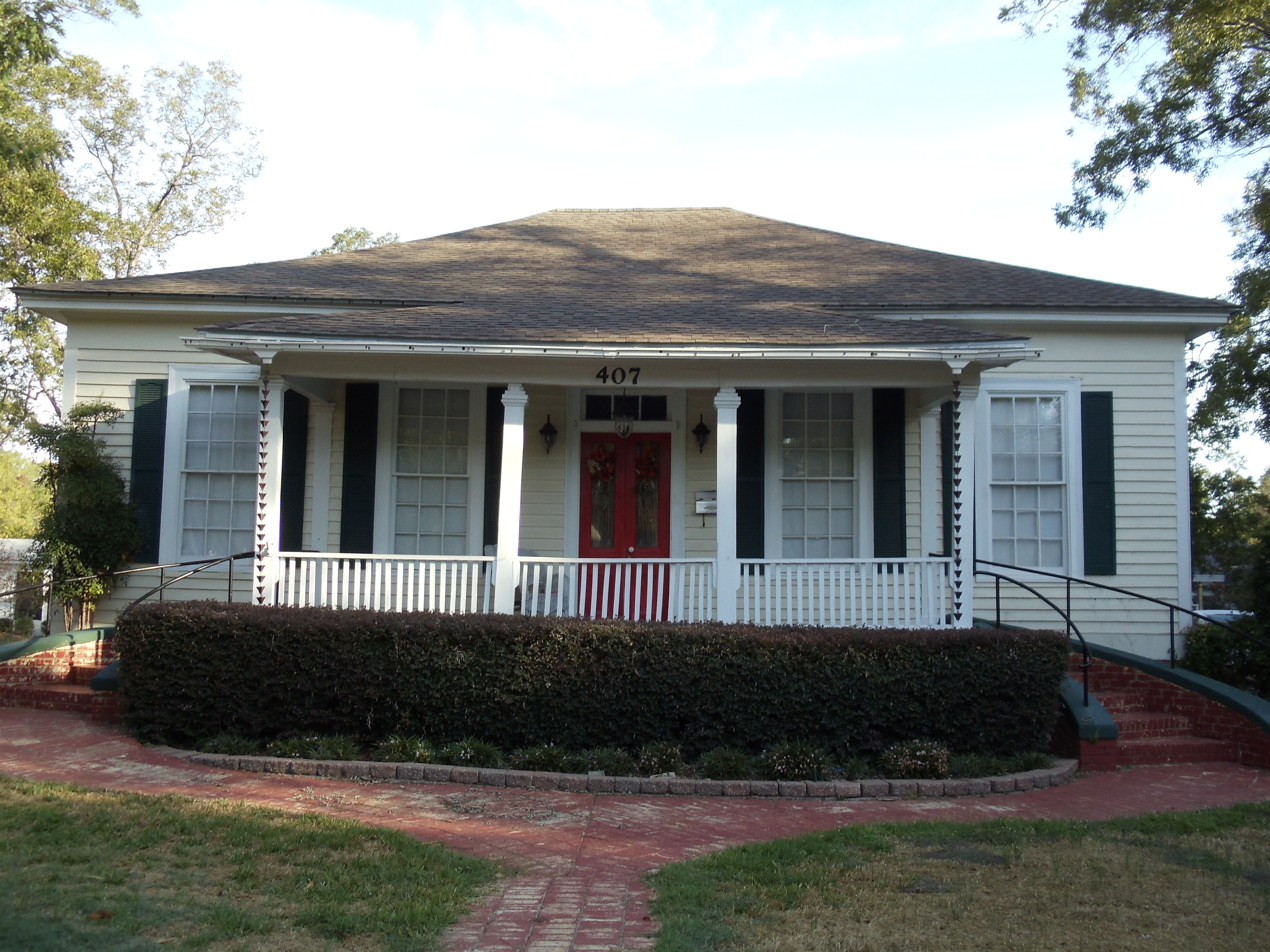
Old Atkins House

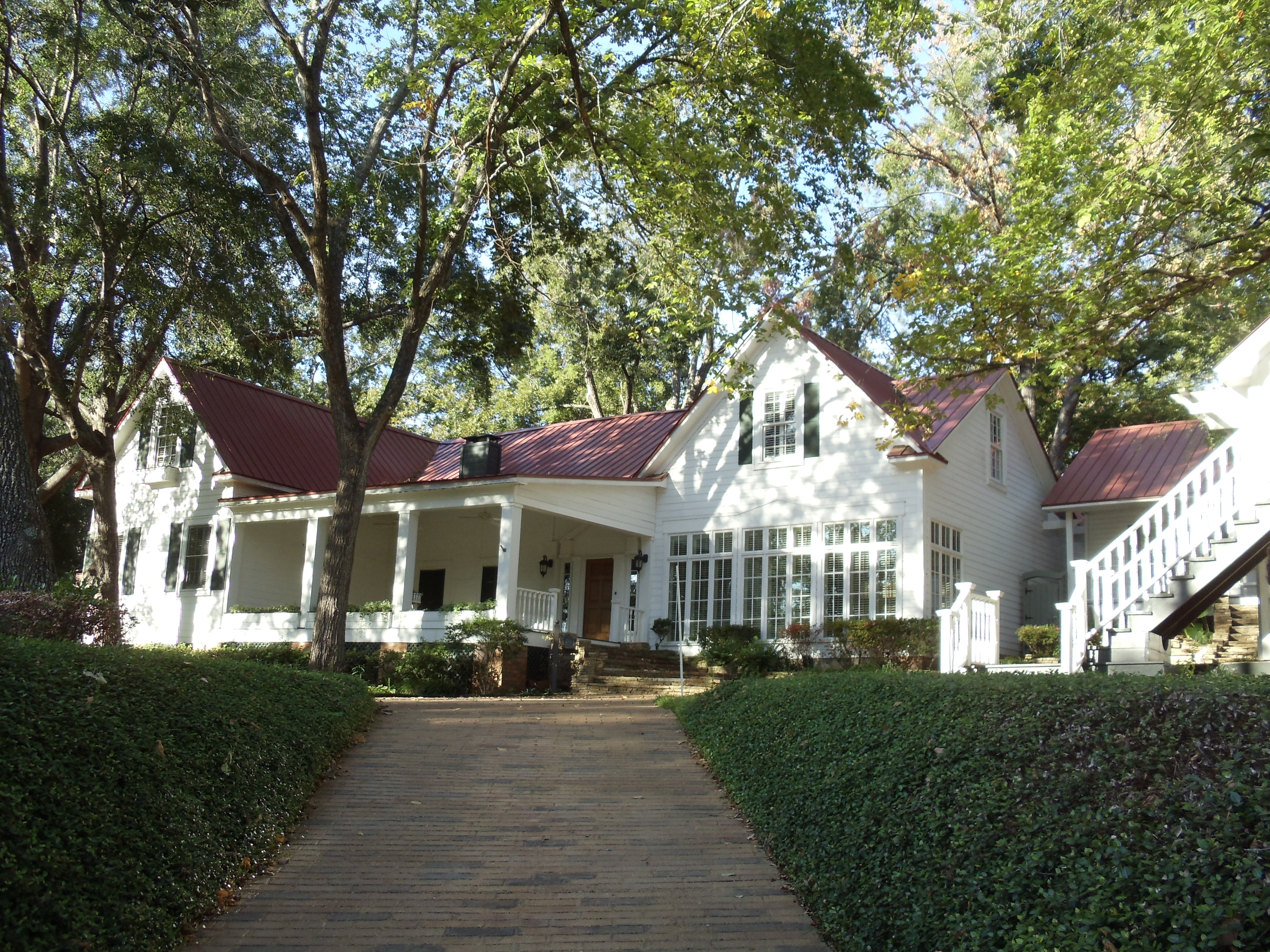
Thurman Place

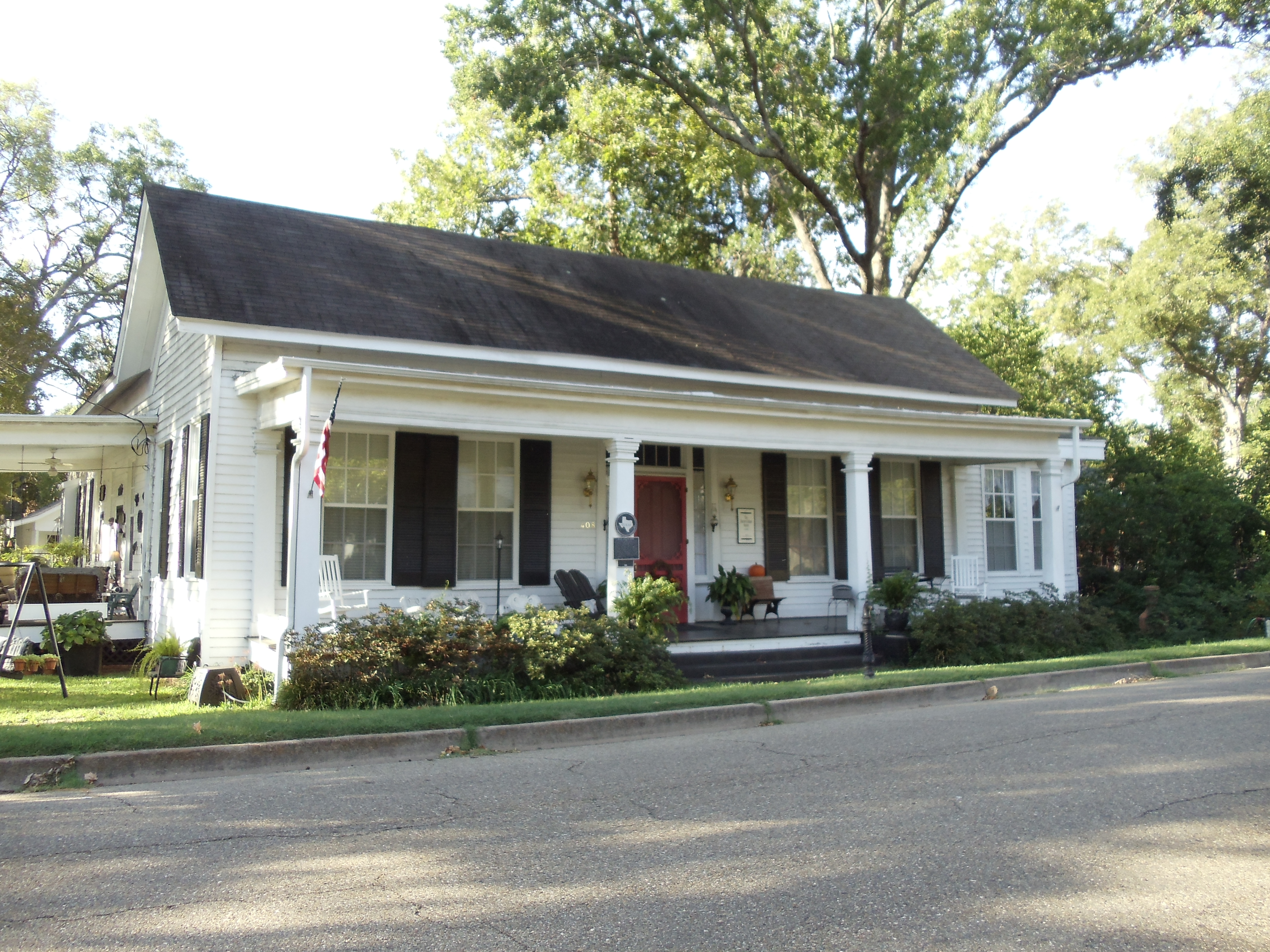
Alice Emmert Home

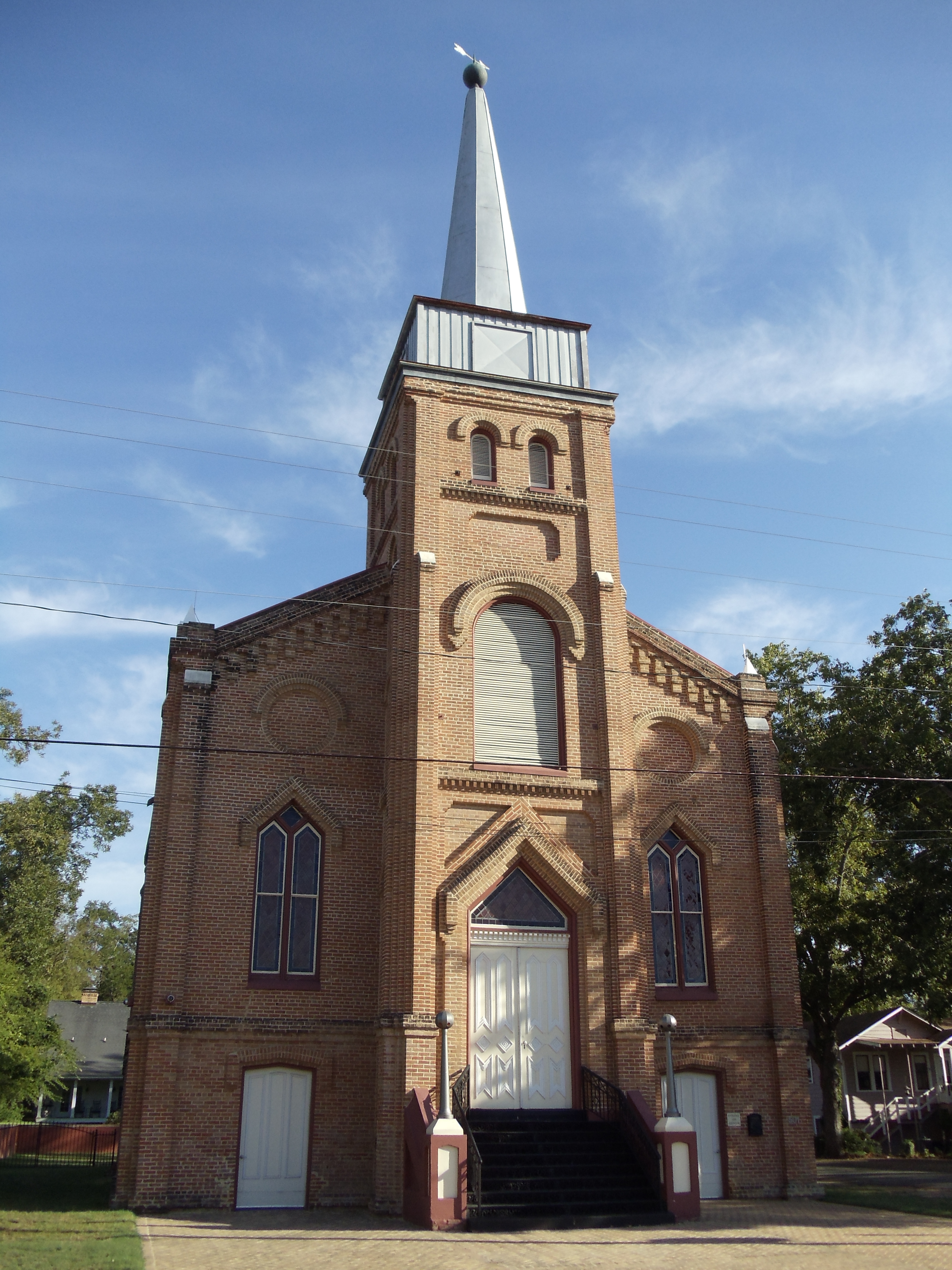
Cumberland Presbyterian Church

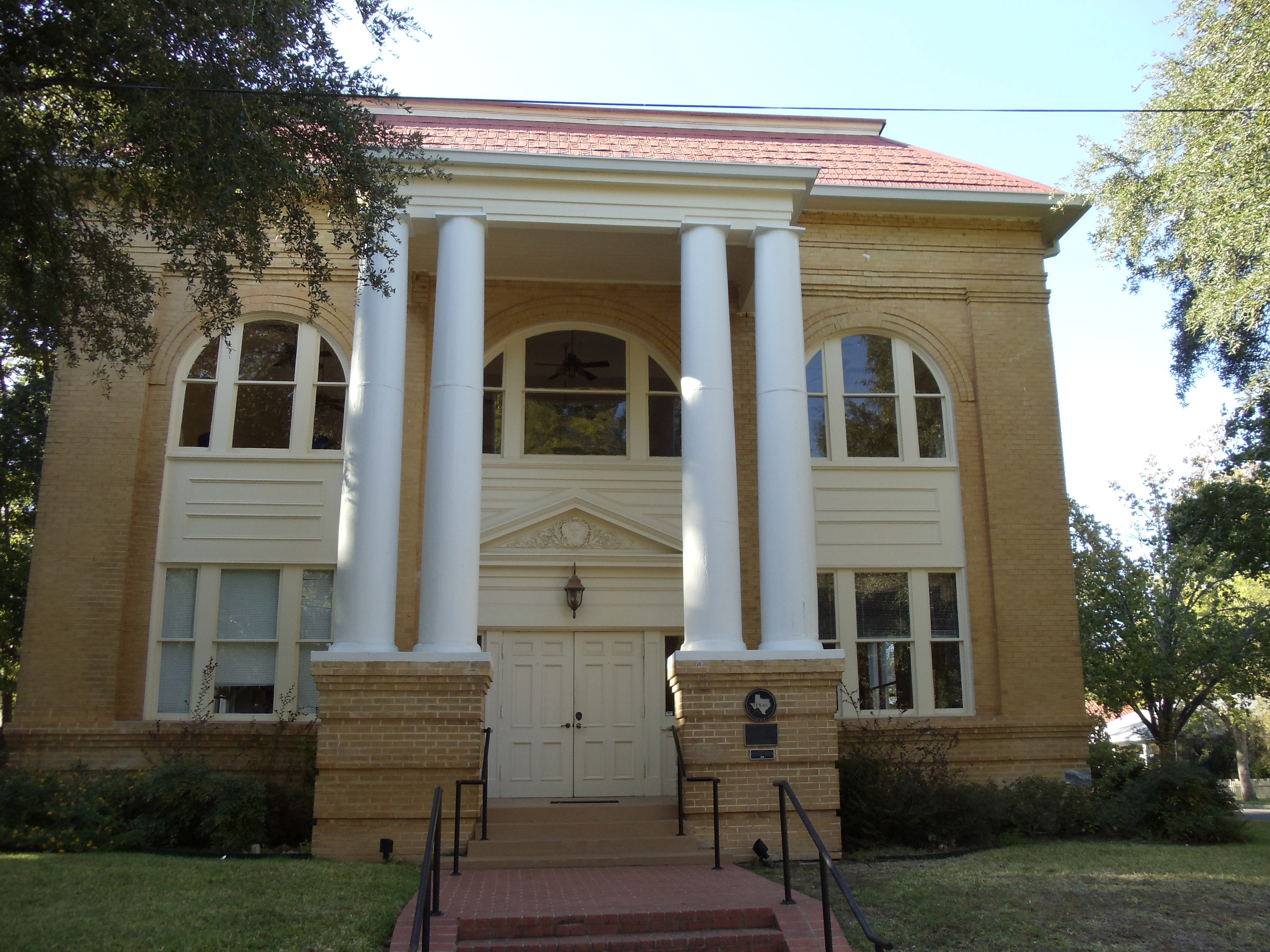
Jefferson Carnegie Library

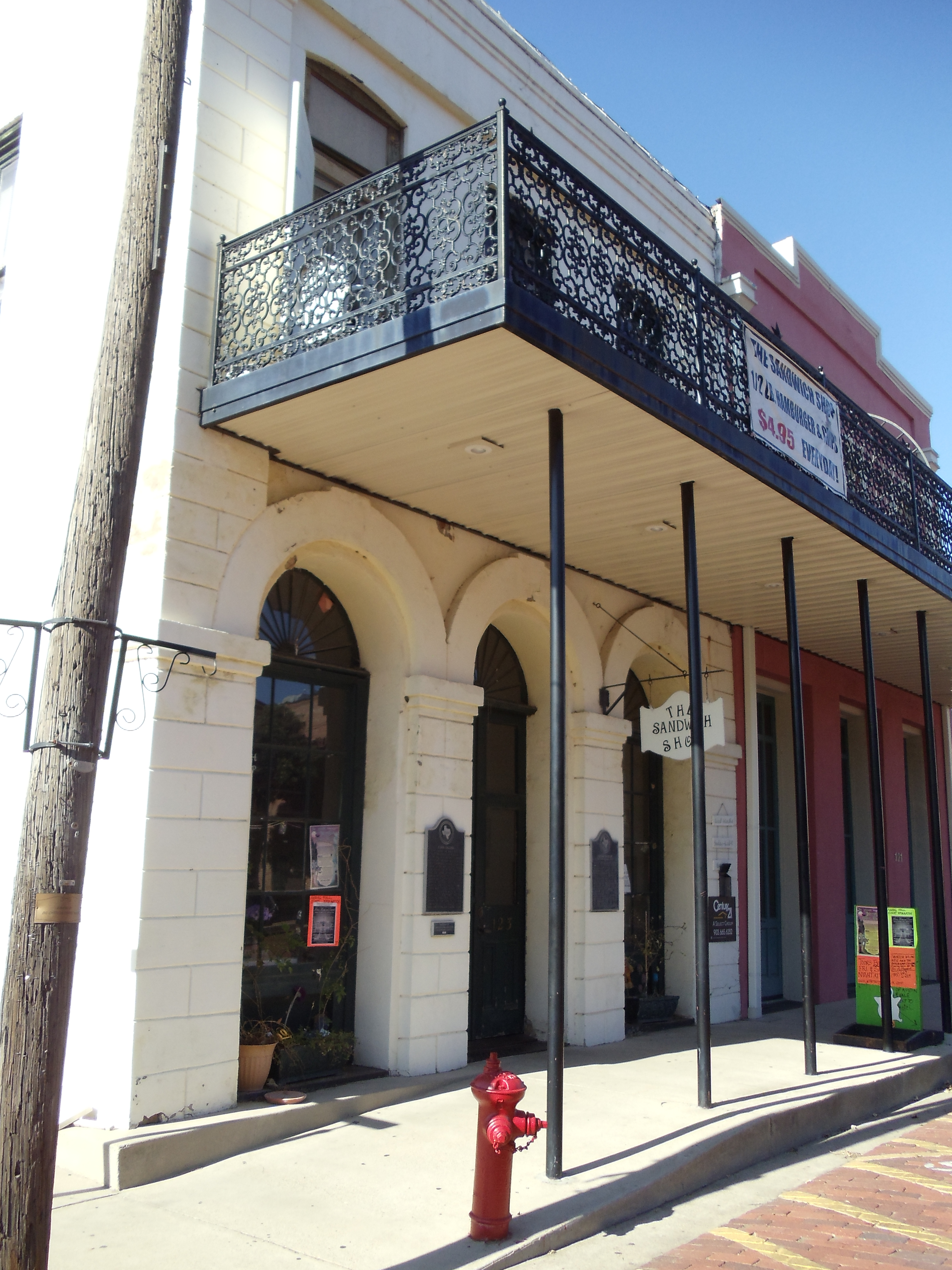
Kahn Saloon

== See also ==
- National Register of Historic Places listings in Marion County, Texas
- Recorded Texas Historic Landmarks in Marion County
