= Queen City Independent School District =

School district in Texas

Queen City Independent School District is a public school district based in Queen City, Texas (USA).

In addition to Queen City, the district also serves the town of Domino and a small portion of Atlanta.

In 2009, the school district was rated "academically acceptable" by the Texas Education Agency.

== Schools ==
- Queen City High School (Grades 9–12)
- Morris Upchurch Middle (Grades 5–8)
- J.K. Hileman Elementary (Grades PK-4)
