= Shanghai Pierce (rancher) =

American rancher (1834–1900)

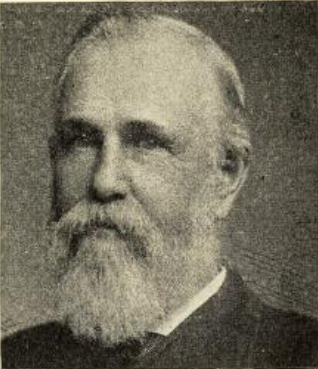
- Pierce in a 1925 publication
- Born: June 29, 1834; Little Compton, Rhode Island, US
- Died: December 26, 1900 (aged 66)
- Occupation: Rancher
- Relatives: John Alden (8th-great-grandfather); Priscilla Mullins (8th-great-grandmother); Henry Wadsworth Longfellow; Franklin Pierce; Thomas Wentworth Pierce

Abel Head "Shanghai" Pierce (June 29, 1834 – December 26, 1900) was an American rancher.

== Biography ==
He was born on June 29, 1834, in Little Compton, Rhode Island, and was a direct descendant of John Alden and Priscilla Mullins, with nine generations in between. He was related to Henry Wadsworth Longfellow, U.S. President Franklin Pierce, and Thomas Wentworth Pierce, builder of the Southern Pacific Railroad in Texas. At age nineteen, Pierce stowed away on a ship in the New York harbor. He worked for his passage and arrived in Indianola, Texas, five months later without money or a job. He went to work for W. B. Grimes as a ranch hand. By shrewdness, hard work, and rugged determination he became an authority on cattle while working for Grimes. How Pierce acquired the name "Shanghai" is a matter of speculation. J. Frank Dobie reported that it was due to Pierce's resemblance to a banty Shanghai rooster: long-legged and short-panted. Wharton County folklore holds that the name resulted from his ruthless business dealings. Pierce died on December 26, 1900. Pierce, Texas is named for him.

In 1871, Charlie Siringo worked on Rancho Grande, owned by Shanghai Pierce and Allen. Siringo wrote that the ranch, "at that time was considered one of the largest ranches in the whole state of Texas. To give you an idea of its size, will state, that the next year after I went to work we branded twenty-five thousand calves-that is, just in one season."

In 1912, Siringo visited Deming's Bridge-Hawley Cemetery to see Shanghai Pierce's 40 foot tall, $10,000 bronze statue. Siringo wrote the statue was "as natural as life," and he could hear Shanghai's voice, "which could be heard nearly half a mile, even when he tried to whisper."

== Fictional portrayals ==
Ted de Corsia played Pierce in the 1957 film Gunfight at the O.K. Corral.

Roy Roberts was cast as Pierce in a 1957 episode of The Life and Legend of Wyatt Earp.

George Tobias played Shanghai Pierce in the episode of the television series Laramie, starring John Smith and Robert Fuller.

Former wrestler Henry O. Godwinn used the name Shanghai Pierce in World Championship Wrestling.
