= Queen City, Texas =

- City
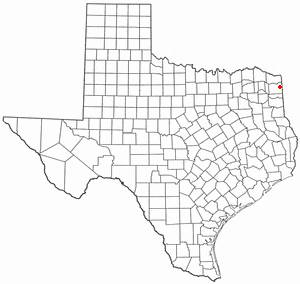
- Location of Queen City, Texas

- Coordinates: 33°09′03″N 94°09′09″W
- Country: United States
- State: Texas
- County: Cass

Area
  - Total: 3.56 sq mi (9.23 km^{2})
  - Land: 3.54 sq mi (9.18 km^{2})
  - Water: 0.019 sq mi (0.05 km^{2})
- Elevation: 335 ft (102 m)

Population (2020)
  - Total: 1,397
  - Density: 394/sq mi (152/km^{2})
- Time zone: UTC-6 (Central (CST))
  - Summer (DST): UTC-5 (CDT)
- ZIP code: 75572
- Area codes: 903, 430
- FIPS code: 48-60080
- GNIS feature ID: 2411506
- Website: www.queencitytx.org

Queen City is a city in Cass County, Texas, United States. The population was 1,476 as of the 2010 census; in 2020, its population was 1,397.

== Geography ==
Queen City is located in northeastern Cass County and is bordered to the south by the city of Atlanta. U.S. Route 59 passes through Queen City, leading north 22 miles (35 km) to Texarkana and south into Atlanta. According to the United States Census Bureau, Queen City has a total area of 3.6 square miles (9.2 km^{2}), of which 0.02 square miles (0.05 km^{2}), or 0.56%, is water.

== Demographics ==
Historical population
Census	Pop.	Note	%±
1880	301		—
1890	672		123.3%
1910	388		—
1920	398		2.6%
1930	321		−19.3%
1950	511		—
1960	1,081		111.5%
1970	1,227		13.5%
1980	1,748		42.5%
1990	1,748		0.0%
2000	1,613		−7.7%
2010	1,476		−8.5%
2020	1,397		−5.4%
U.S. Decennial Census

=== 2020 census ===
As of the 2020 census, Queen City had a population of 1,397, 610 households, and 389 families. The median age was 39.5 years; 25.0% of residents were under the age of 18 and 19.4% of residents were 65 years of age or older. For every 100 females there were 81.9 males, and for every 100 females age 18 and over there were 77.3 males age 18 and over.

77.7% of residents lived in urban areas, while 22.3% lived in rural areas.

There were 610 households in Queen City, of which 31.3% had children under the age of 18 living in them. Of all households, 34.1% were married-couple households, 18.5% were households with a male householder and no spouse or partner present, and 42.3% were households with a female householder and no spouse or partner present. About 36.9% of all households were made up of individuals and 18.4% had someone living alone who was 65 years of age or older.

There were 737 housing units, of which 17.2% were vacant. The homeowner vacancy rate was 4.5% and the rental vacancy rate was 14.8%.

Racial composition as of the 2020 census
Race	Number	Percent
White	998	71.4%
Black or African American	291	20.8%
American Indian and Alaska Native	17	1.2%
Asian	14	1.0%
Native Hawaiian and Other Pacific Islander	0	0.0%
Some other race	15	1.1%
Two or more races	62	4.4%
Hispanic or Latino (of any race)	42	3.0%

=== 2000 census ===
As of the census of 2000, there were 1,613 people, 660 households, and 440 families residing in the city. The population density was 451.1 inhabitants per square mile (174.2/km^{2}). There were 763 housing units at an average density of 213.4 per square mile (82.4/km^{2}). The racial makeup of the city was 82.27% White, 14.45% African American, 0.81% Native American, 0.19% Asian, 0.68% from other races, and 1.61% from two or more races. Hispanic or Latino of any race were 1.92% of the population.

There were 660 households, out of which 33.5% had children under the age of 18 living with them, 47.9% were married couples living together, 15.3% had a female householder with no husband present, and 33.2% were non-families. 30.0% of all households were made up of individuals, and 14.5% had someone living alone who was 65 years of age or older. The average household size was 2.44 and the average family size was 3.03.

In the city, the population was spread out, with 27.1% under the age of 18, 8.9% from 18 to 24, 28.7% from 25 to 44, 21.6% from 45 to 64, and 13.8% who were 65 years of age or older. The median age was 36 years. For every 100 females, there were 83.5 males. For every 100 females age 18 and over, there were 78.7 males.

The median income for a household in the city was $26,058, and the median income for a family was $36,389. Males had a median income of $27,031 versus $18,250 for females. The per capita income for the city was $13,492. About 17.7% of families and 19.6% of the population were below the poverty line, including 25.1% of those under age 18 and 19.5% of those age 65 or over.

== Education ==
Queen City is served by the Queen City Independent School District, and is home to the Queen City Bulldogs.

The majority of Cass County, including Queen City ISD, is in the service area of Texarkana College.

== See also ==
- List of cities in Texas
