= List of CPBL Most Progressive Awards =

The CPBL most progressive award is the annual award officially given by Chinese Professional Baseball League. It is given to one player in the league. The award recognizes players who have "re-emerged" as a player during a single season. First was given in 1993.

== List of winners ==
Year	Player	Chinese name	Team	Position
1993	Joselite Cano	阿Q	Uni-President Lions	Pitcher
1994	Liu Yi-chuan	劉義傳	Mercuries Tigers	Pitcher
1995	Liao Chun-ming	廖俊銘	Mercuries Tigers	Pitcher
1996	Huang Wen-po	黃文博	Wei Chuan Dragons	Pitcher
1997	Li Kun-che	李坤哲	Koos Group Whales	Outfielder
1998	Huang Chiung-lung	黃煚隆	Wei Chuan Dragons	Outfielder
1999	Wu Chun-yi	吳俊億	Brother Elephants	Pitcher
2000	Weng Feng-yu	翁豐堉	Sinon Bulls	Pitcher
2001	Hsieh Cheng-hsun	謝承勳	Koos Group Whales	Pitcher
2002	Sung Chao-chi	宋肇基	Chinatrust Whales	Pitcher
2003	Chi Chun-lin	紀俊麟	Chinatrust Whales	Outfielder
2004	Li Ming-chin	李明進	Macoto Cobras	Pitcher
2005	Hsu Chu-chien	許竹見	Macoto Cobras	Pitcher
2006	Tseng Chao-hao	曾兆豪	Chinatrust Whales	Pitcher
2007	Hsu Yu-wei	徐余偉	La New Bears	Pitcher
2008	Liao Yu-cheng	廖于誠	Brother Elephants	Pitcher
2009	Cheng Ta-hung	鄭達鴻	Sinon Bulls	Outfielder
2010	Wang Feng-hsin	王豐鑫	La New Bears	Pitcher
2011	Su Chien-jung	蘇建榮	Sinon Bulls	Outfielder
2012	Chan Chih-yao	詹智堯	Lamigo Monkeys	Outfielder
2013	Lin Tsung-nan	林宗男	EDA Rhinos	Third baseman
2014	Chang Yung-han	張詠漢	EDA Rhinos	Outfielder
2015	Lin Po-yu	林柏佑	Lamigo Monkeys	Pitcher
2016	Kuo Sheng-an	郭勝安	EDA Rhinos	Pitcher
2017	Chang Keng-hao	張耿豪	Fubon Guardians	Pitcher
2018	Kuo Yung-wei	郭永維	Lamigo Monkeys	Shortstop
2019	Chen Shih-peng	陳仕朋	Fubon Guardians	Pitcher
2020	Cheng Chun-jen	鄭鈞仁	Uni-President 7-Eleven Lions	Pitcher
2021	Yu Chao-wei	游朝惟	Rakuten Monkeys	Pitcher
2022	Wu Che-yuan	吳哲源	CTBC Brothers	Pitcher
2023	Lee Tsung-hsien	李宗賢	Fubon Guardians	Third baseman
2024	Chen Bo-hao	陳柏豪	Rakuten Monkeys	Pitcher
2025	Li Wu Yung-qin	李吳永勤	Fubon Guardians	Pitcher

== See also ==
- Baseball awards#Taiwan
- MLB Comeback Player of the Year Award
- Comeback Player of the Year Award (disambiguation)
