= Philip Humber =

American baseball player (born 1982)

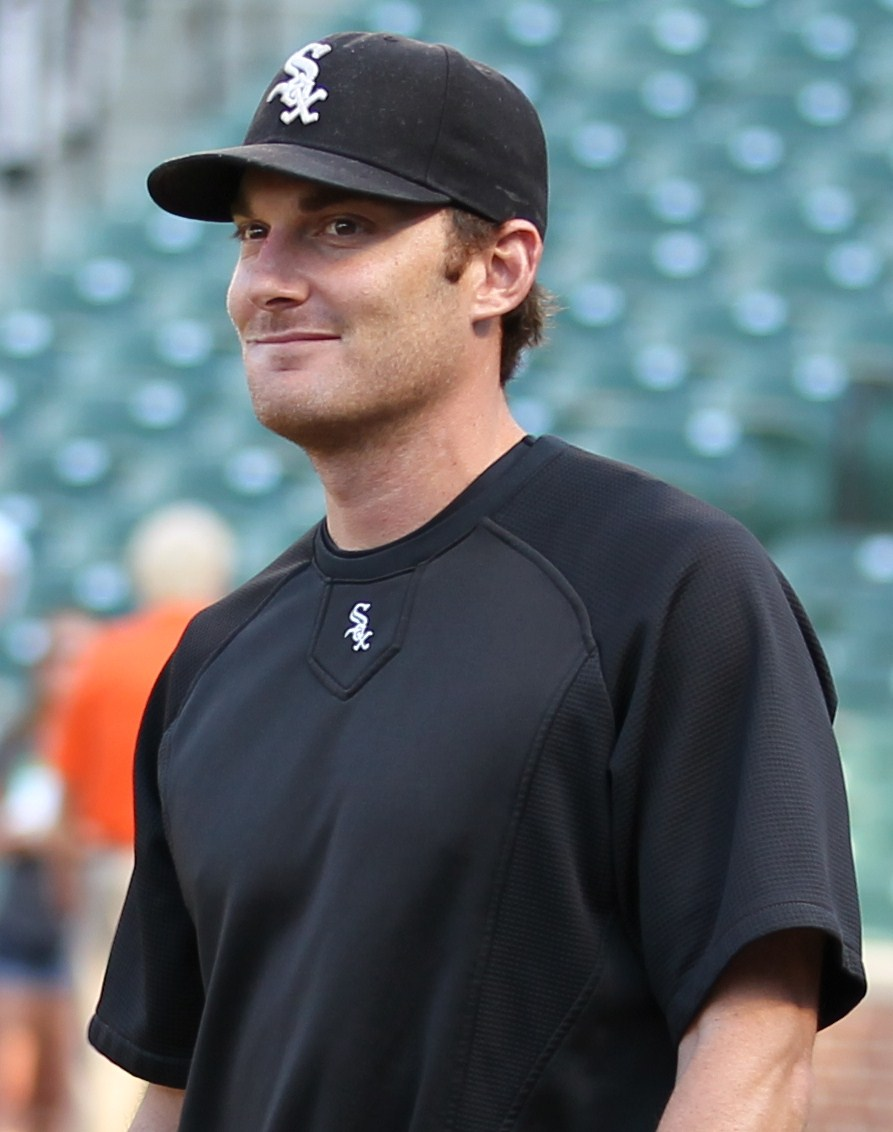
- Humber with the Chicago White Sox
- Pitcher
- Born: December 21, 1982 (age 43); Nacogdoches, Texas, U.S.
- Batted: Right Threw: Right

Professional debut
- MLB: September 24, 2006, for the New York Mets
- KBO: March 29, 2015, for the Kia Tigers

Last appearance
- MLB: September 22, 2013, for the Houston Astros
- KBO: June 26, 2015, for the Kia Tigers

MLB statistics
- Win–loss record: 16–23
- Earned run average: 5.31
- Strikeouts: 272

KBO statistics
- Win–loss record: 3–3
- Earned run average: 6.75
- Strikeouts: 35
- Stats at Baseball Reference

Teams
- New York Mets (2006–2007); Minnesota Twins (2008–2009); Kansas City Royals (2010); Chicago White Sox (2011–2012); Houston Astros (2013); Kia Tigers (2015)

Career highlights and awards
- Pitched a perfect game on April 21, 2012
Medals
Men's baseball
Representing United States
World University Baseball Championship
Silver medal – second place	2002 Messina	Team

Philip Gregory Humber (/ˈʌmbər/; born December 21, 1982) is an American former professional baseball pitcher. He pitched for the New York Mets, Minnesota Twins, Kansas City Royals, Chicago White Sox, and Houston Astros in seven seasons in Major League Baseball (MLB). Although he debuted in the major leagues in 2006 and had worked mostly as a starter in the minor leagues, he did not become a regular MLB starter until 2011.

Humber earned three Texas Little League state championships. He subsequently attended Carthage High School in Carthage, Texas, where he led the baseball team to the state championship game in 2001, his senior season, winning state Player of the Year honors. He then attended Rice University, where he played college baseball for the Rice Owls baseball team. Humber was the winning pitcher in the clinching game of the 2003 College World Series. He has also represented the United States at the World University Baseball Championship.

The Mets selected Humber with the third overall selection in the 2004 MLB draft. During his minor league career, he underwent ulnar collateral ligament reconstruction before making his MLB debut with the Mets in 2006. It took him several years to regain his ability to throw with the same velocity that he had prior to the injury. After being included in a trade to the Twins for Johan Santana, Humber struggled to establish himself. He spent a year with the Royals organization and was briefly a member of the Oakland Athletics organization, before being claimed on waivers by the White Sox in 2011, getting an opportunity to pitch in the White Sox' starting rotation. On April 21, 2012, Humber pitched the 21st perfect game in MLB history, defeating the Seattle Mariners.

== Early life ==
Born in Nacogdoches, Texas, Humber was raised in Carthage, Texas. Living in an area with an abundance of baseball fields, Humber grew up with a batting cage in his backyard. At the age of 11, Humber visited the Chicago White Sox during spring training in Florida as the guest of Robert Ellis, a family friend of the Humbers, who then was a minor league baseball pitcher for the White Sox.

Carthage was a Texas anomaly, its baseball athletes being the most admired role models rather than its football players. As of 2004, the Panola County Dixie League teams had won 15 state championships in the preceding 20 years and Humber played for three state champions.

== Amateur career ==
Humber attended Carthage High School. The Carthage Bulldogs had won the state title in 1990 and been one of the final four teams in the state tournament in 1994. Humber was promoted from junior varsity midway through his sophomore season. He compiled a 4–0 win–loss record with a low 1.09 earned run average (ERA). He went 7–2 as a junior, and posted a 13–1 record with a 0.90 ERA and 146 strikeouts as a senior. A capable batter, he also had a .371 batting average with six home runs. Humber threw a shutout in the Texas University Interscholastic League Class 4A semifinals against Cedar Park High School in 2001, his senior season. Although Carthage lost the state championship to Western Hills High School in baseball that year, Humber was named Texas High School Class 4A Player of the Year by the Texas Sports Writers Association. According to former Major League Baseball prospect and East Texas native Alan Move: "Back in high school, he (Humber) threw harder than everyone else and changed speeds pretty well and that's all you need in high school."

Humber was drafted by the New York Yankees in the 29th round of the 2001 Major League Baseball draft. As the 875th pick overall, he described himself as "more of a draft-and-follow" prospect. The Yankees made Humber an offer in an attempt to lure him away from his college scholarship, but he did not sign, choosing instead to attend Rice University in order to play college baseball for the Rice Owls baseball team, competing in the Western Athletic Conference (WAC) of NCAA Division I.

At Rice, Humber was coached by Wayne Graham. Humber's first home appearance at Reckling Park was in the annual Rice Alumni game in February 2002. After retiring his first two batters in relief, Humber faced a pair of Major League Baseball players. José Cruz Jr. bounced the baseball off of the wall in center field and then Lance Berkman hit the ball over the scoreboard. After his inauspicious debut, he became a dominant pitcher during his three college seasons for the Rice Owls, stepping into the nationally ranked Owls' starting rotation as a freshman. Humber finished his freshman season in 2002 with an 11–1 win–loss record, a 2.78 ERA, and a WAC-leading 130 strikeouts in 110 2/3 innings, earning National Freshman Player of the Year honors from Collegiate Baseball and All-America honors from several publications—Collegiate Baseball (Second Team), Baseball America (Second Team) and Baseball Weekly (Third Team). Humber's strikeout total was the most for an Owl freshman since 1976. That season, Rice reached the 2002 College World Series, but lost its first two games and was eliminated. Nonetheless, Humber earned an invitation to USA Baseball's national team trials. He was the scheduled starter in the second of the two games, which was against the Notre Dame Fighting Irish on June 17, but the team could not hold a 3–2 lead in the bottom of the ninth. He then competed for the United States national baseball team at the 2002 World University Baseball Championship, which was held in Messina, Sicily. On August 7, he earned a victory for the United States in a game against the South Korean team. The United States won the silver medal in the tournament.

Entering his sophomore season, he was expected to be a key part of the starting pitching rotation. The 2003 season saw the development of Rice's "Big Three" rotation, featuring Humber and sophomore classmates Wade Townsend and Jeff Niemann. Humber developed a curveball that season, to augment his arsenal that included a fastball, changeup and split-finger fastball. During the season, Humber achieved his 17th consecutive win in WAC play. He was recognized as a Third Team All-American by Collegiate Baseball and was a First Team All-Western Athletic Conference honoree. The trio entered the 2003 College World Series with gaudy numbers — Niemann (16–0, 1.63 ERA) and Townsend (10–1, 1.90 ERA) complementing Humber — and with Humber scheduled for the third game, if necessary. Humber finished with an 11–3 win–loss record with a 3.30 ERA, as Rice won its first national championship in any team sport. He pitched a complete game in the decisive third game of the series, a 14–2 win over the Stanford Cardinal. The game established a College World Series record for largest title game margin of victory. During the season, Rice established a school record 30-game winning streak. Upon his becoming the College World Series hero, June 26, 2003 was declared 'Philip Humber Day' in his hometown of Carthage, Texas in his honor. Following the season, all three pitchers competed in collegiate summer baseball in the Cape Cod Baseball League; Humber pitched for the Yarmouth–Dennis Red Sox. Baseball America rated Humber as the seventh-best prospect in the Cape Cod League.

In his junior season of 2004, Humber compiled a 13–4 win–loss record and 2.27 ERA. He struck out 154 batters and issued only 37 walks in 115 innings. He also set the Rice single-game record for strikeouts when he struck out 17 Hawaii Rainbow Warriors hitters on March 20, 2004. Rice entered the 64-team NCAA Baseball tournament as one of the eight national seeds. In the first game of the regional round of the tournament, Rice was upset by the Texas Southern Tigers. Humber entered the next game against the Texas A&M Aggies with the bases loaded and surrendered a first-pitch grand slam to Justin Ruggiano. For the season, Humber totaled 154 strikeouts in 115 innings pitched.

Humber finished his three-year career with a 35–8 win–loss record and 2.80 ERA, striking out 422 in 354 innings pitched. Humber's totals rank him with the third most wins in Rice baseball history and second most strikeouts. Among his honors for the season were selection to the 2004 Louisville Slugger All-America team by Collegiate Baseball and the 2004 USA TODAY/Sports Weekly All-America team. During the inaugural year for the Roger Clemens Award, which designates the top college pitcher, he was one of 10 named semifinalists. He was also among the 10 finalists for the Dick Howser Trophy in 2004, in recognition of his performance as one of college baseball's top players.

Following the early exit in the Houston Regional due to the upset by the Aggies, Humber looked forward to the Major League Baseball Draft. Niemann, and Townsend were all selected along with Humber in the first eight picks of the 2004 MLB Draft — the first time three teammates had ever gone so early in the same draft. Only twice had three teammates been taken in the first round, most recently when Steve Hosey, Tom Goodwin and Eddie Zosky of the Fresno State Bulldogs were selected in the first round of the 1989 Major League Baseball draft. Teammate David Aardsma, a relief pitcher, was also selected in the first round.

== Professional career ==
=== New York Mets (2006–2007) ===
The New York Mets chose Humber out of Rice University with their first-round pick in the 2004 Major League Baseball draft, the third overall selection. The Mets chose Humber over Jered Weaver and Stephen Drew, who also received consideration, as they considered Humber to be the "safe" selection. They also scouted Justin Verlander, who the Detroit Tigers had chosen with the second overall pick. It was reported that the Mets preferred Verlander, and would have chosen him if the Tigers had selected Drew.

On January 11, 2005, Humber and the Mets agreed to a five-year contract, ending a long holdout the day before the Mets began their two-day minicamp in Port St. Lucie, Florida. Humber and the Mets were motivated to complete a deal due to a change in federal tax law that made signing bonuses subject to Federal Insurance Contributions Act and Social Security taxes. There is some discrepancy about the value of the contract. According to MLB.com, Humber received a combined $3.7 million signing bonus and contract from the Mets. The Houston Chronicle reported the contract to be a $4.2 million deal with a $3 million signing bonus and that Humber would fly to minicamp. Six months later, Lee Jenkins of The New York Times also reported the signing bonus to be $3 million, but he claimed the contract was for $5 million in total. John Manuel of Baseball America reported the contract was worth a maximum of $5.116 million, with $4.2 million guaranteed.

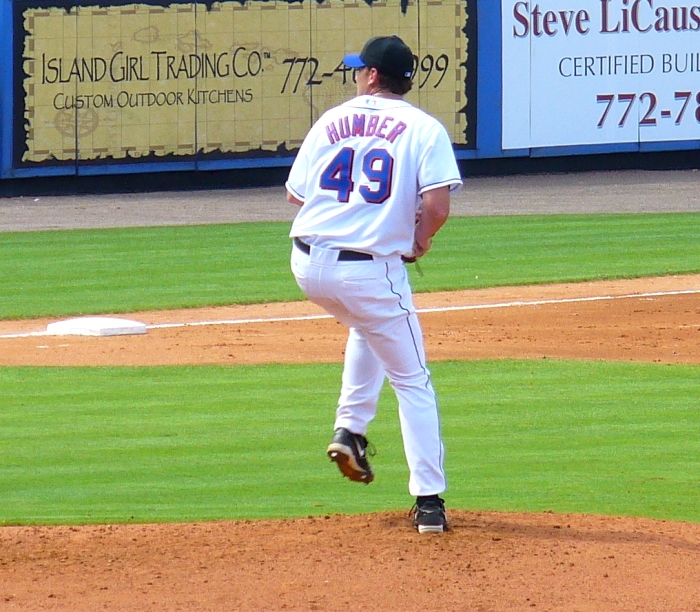
Humber pitching for the New York Mets in 2007 spring training

Baseball America rated Humber as the 50th-best prospect in baseball heading into the 2005 season. Humber entered spring training in 2005 with the Mets. There, he clashed with Mets' pitching coach Rick Peterson, who wanted Humber to adopt a different training regimen and change the manner with which he threw the ball to the plate. The Mets front office supported Humber, telling him to pitch how he felt comfortable.

After the brief stint in spring training, the Mets assigned Humber to start his professional career with the St. Lucie Mets of the Class-A Advanced Florida State League, where, in 14 starts, he posted a 2–6 win–loss record and a 4.99 ERA. Humber was then promoted to the Double-A Binghamton Mets of the Eastern League. In one start, Humber gave up three earned runs in four innings. Humber left the game early due to elbow pain caused by bone spurs, which required ulnar collateral ligament reconstruction (more commonly known as Tommy John surgery) to repair a torn ligament in his elbow. The surgery was performed by Dr. James Andrews of the American Sports Medicine Institute. His Rice pitching teammates Townsend (Tommy John surgery) and Niemann (arthroscopic shoulder surgery) also endured major surgeries that year. Rice coach Graham, who also coached MLB starters such as Roger Clemens and Andy Pettitte in college, shied away from any blame, noting that all three missed out on fall league play by holding out. In spite of his arm surgery, Humber was named the 20th-best prospect in the Florida State League by Baseball America, which ranked him as the fifth-best prospect in the Mets organization following the season.

On March 8, Humber was assigned to the Mets minor league camp. After rehabilitating from surgery, he resumed pitching with St. Lucie in 2006, posting 3–1 record with a 2.37 ERA in seven starts. On July 31, 2006, a year after his surgery, Humber was once again promoted to Binghamton, where he was 2–2 with a 2.88 ERA in six starts. He was an early September call-up when the Major League rosters expanded on September 1. However, Humber did not make his Major League Baseball debut until September 24, 2006. He made two appearances for the Mets as a relief pitcher, pitching two innings. However, Humber was unable to obtain his pre-surgery velocity. That fall, he began play in the Arizona Fall League but his participation was discontinued when he endured shoulder tendinitis.

Before the 2007 season, Baseball America rated Humber as the fourth-best prospect in the Mets organization. That year, the Mets had nine pitchers competing for five spots in the starting rotation in spring training camp. Óliver Pérez, Tom Glavine, Orlando Hernández, and John Maine were the favorites for the spots in the rotation. Veterans Aaron Sele, Chan Ho Park and Jorge Sosa were also invited to camp so that the team could be patient with former first round draft choices Humber and Mike Pelfrey, who were considered the most promising pitchers in camp. Rated the 73rd-best prospect in baseball by Baseball America prior to the 2007 season, Humber competed for a spot on the Mets roster in spring training. However, Humber was optioned to the minor leagues on March 16. Assigned to the Triple-A New Orleans Zephyrs of the Pacific Coast League (PCL), Humber had an 11–9 record and 4.27 ERA in 25 starts. He allowed 129 hits and walked 44 while striking out 120 batters in 139 innings. For the season, Humber finished tied for fourth in the PCL in wins and had the tenth-best ERA. He had started the season by earning the PCL Pitcher of the week for the week ending April 22. That week, he allowed two earned runs in 13 innings of work over two starts, earning a win on April 16 against the Nashville Sounds with six innings of work and suffering a blown save after seven innings against the Albuquerque Isotopes on April 21. He flirted with a no-hitter with the Zephyrs on August 22 when he entered the ninth inning without giving up a hit to the Iowa Cubs. In his subsequent start, he allowed only an unearned run on two hits over five innings, but he was removed from the game when a batted ball hit him in the shoulder.

Humber was promoted to the Mets, again as a September call-up, on September 2. Though the Mets considered inserting him into the starting rotation immediately, they chose to start Pelfrey. Humber made two relief appearances for the Mets, on September 5 and 11. The Mets, having lost eight of their previous 12 games and seen their lead over the Philadelphia Phillies in the National League East division race decrease from seven games to two, removed Pelfrey from the final rotation to give an extra day of rest to pitchers Pérez, Maine, and Pedro Martínez, and gave Humber his first Major League start on September 26, 2007, against the Washington Nationals, choosing him over Dave Williams. Although the Mets raced out to a 6–2 lead, Humber allowed five runs in four-plus innings, receiving a no decision in a game the Mets eventually lost, 9–6. The decision to start Humber was seen as emblematic of the Mets' desperation. As George Vecsey wrote in The New York Times, "How did it come to this? How did the entire Mets' season come to depend so much on a young pitcher, Philip Humber, who had never started in the major leagues until last night?" He concluded his three MLB appearances (one start) in the 2007 season with a 7.71 ERA.

=== Minnesota Twins (2008–2009) ===
Following the 2007 season, the Mets began to discuss trading Humber to the Minnesota Twins in a package of prospects to acquire two-time Cy Young Award-winning pitcher Johan Santana. Eligible to become a free agent after the 2008 season, Santana had rejected a proposed four-year, $80 million contract extension from the Twins. Assuming that he was unlikely to resign with Minnesota, the Twins began to shop him to other MLB teams.

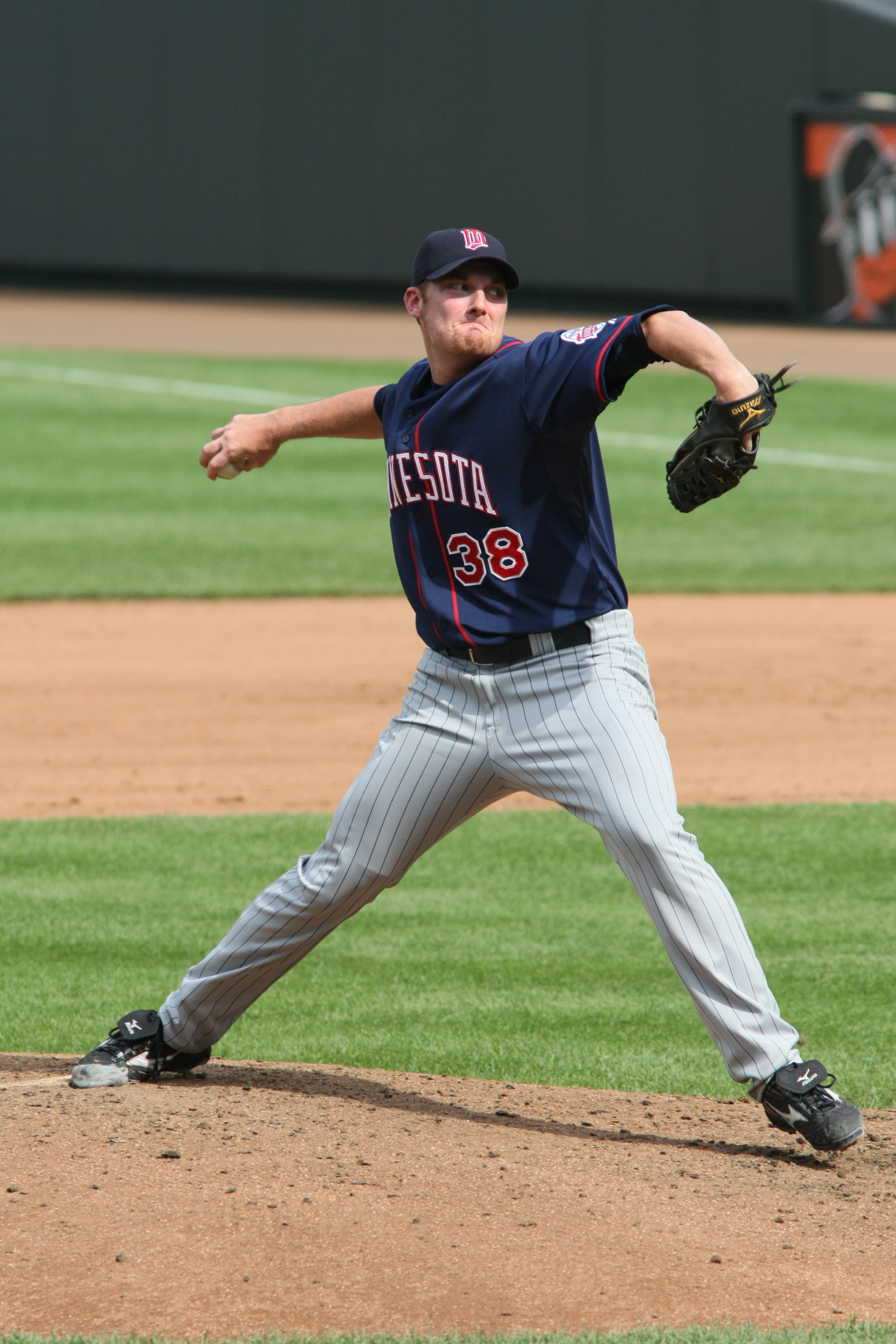
Humber with the Minnesota Twins in 2008

On February 2, 2008, the Mets traded Humber, along with outfielder Carlos Gómez and pitchers Kevin Mulvey and Deolis Guerra, to the Twins for Santana. At the time Baseball America ranked Guerra, Gomez, Mulvey and Humber the second, third, fourth and seventh-best prospects in the Mets organization, respectively.

During spring training, the Twins assigned Humber to Santana's former place in the Twins' clubhouse. While trying to earn a spot in the rotation, Humber compiled 11 consecutive scoreless innings in the Grapefruit League. By late March, Humber had a spring training ERA of 1.29.

Humber spent most of the 2008 season assigned to the Twins' Triple-A affiliate, the Rochester Red Wings of the International League. He started off slowly with an 0–5 record and a 5.83 ERA in his first nine starts. With Rochester, Humber eventually compiled a 10–8 record with a 4.56 ERA in 31 games (23 starts). He finished with a 6–1 win–loss record and a 2.67 ERA in the second half. His 4–1 win–loss record with a 2.74 ERA in August earned him the Minor League Pitcher of the Month Award. The Twins promoted Humber in August 2008, and he appeared in five games for the Twins, all in relief. Humber pitched 11 2/3 innings, and posted a 4.63 ERA and six strikeouts for the Twins. Following the 2008 season, Humber was out of options, and could not be sent to the minor leagues without first being subjected to waivers, where other teams could claim him.

Humber made the Twins' Opening Day roster in 2009 as a long reliever. Humber struggled at the start of the 2009 season, pitching to a 12.46 ERA over 4 1/3 innings, while giving up 11 hits and walking four batters. The Twins designated Humber for assignment on April 17, 2009 to make room on their roster for Juan Morillo, whom the Twins had claimed off waivers from the Colorado Rockies. Humber cleared waivers and the Twins assigned him to Rochester. The Twins recalled Humber in August 2009 due to an injury to Francisco Liriano, but outrighted him to the minor leagues ten days later. Humber was granted free agency after the 2009 season.

=== Kansas City Royals (2010) ===
On December 15, 2009, Humber signed a minor league contract with the Kansas City Royals, receiving an invitation to spring training. After he pitched to an 11.74 ERA in four spring training games, the Royals reassigned Humber to their minor league camp on March 22.

"A couple of years ago I didn't even know if I'd get a major league win."

— Humber after throwing a perfect game on April 21, 2012

Humber was assigned to start the year with the Triple-A Omaha Royals of the PCL. On June 10, 2010, while pitching in a game for Omaha, Humber was hit in the face on a line drive by Luis Cruz. After lying on the mound for a few minutes, he was able to get up and walk on his own to the dugout. He was then transported to a local hospital, where he received eighteen stitches. He earned the second PCL Pitcher of the Week Award of his career for his play during the week ending August 1. He won the award after posting a complete game shutout against the Nashville Sounds on July 30, in which he struck out seven batters while allowing only four hits.

However, Humber began to regain the velocity he had lost following Tommy John surgery in 2005. Humber was called up by the Kansas City Royals on August 5, 2010, when Kansas City designated José Guillén for assignment. On August 25, Humber pitched three relief innings for the Royals against the Detroit Tigers and earned his first MLB win. He finished the 2010 season with a 2–1 win–loss record and 4.15 ERA in eight games (one start) for the Royals. He also appeared in 21 games (20 starts), for Triple-A Omaha, going 5–6 with a 4.47 ERA. The Royals designated Humber for assignment on December 15, 2010, in order to make room on the roster for newly signed Jeff Francoeur.

=== Chicago White Sox (2011–2012) ===
On December 17, 2010, Humber was claimed by the Oakland Athletics, who had extra room on their 40-man roster at the time of the waiver claim. However, the team subsequently filled its 40-man roster and designated Humber for assignment later that off-season in order to make room on their roster for Guillermo Moscoso, whom the Athletics acquired from the Texas Rangers in a trade during January 2011. The Chicago White Sox claimed Humber off waivers from the Athletics on January 18, 2011. He signed a contract worth $500,000 for the season. White Sox pitching coach Don Cooper worked with Humber, as he replaced his cut fastball with a slider and improved his pitching mechanics in the fashion originally recommended by Peterson in 2005.

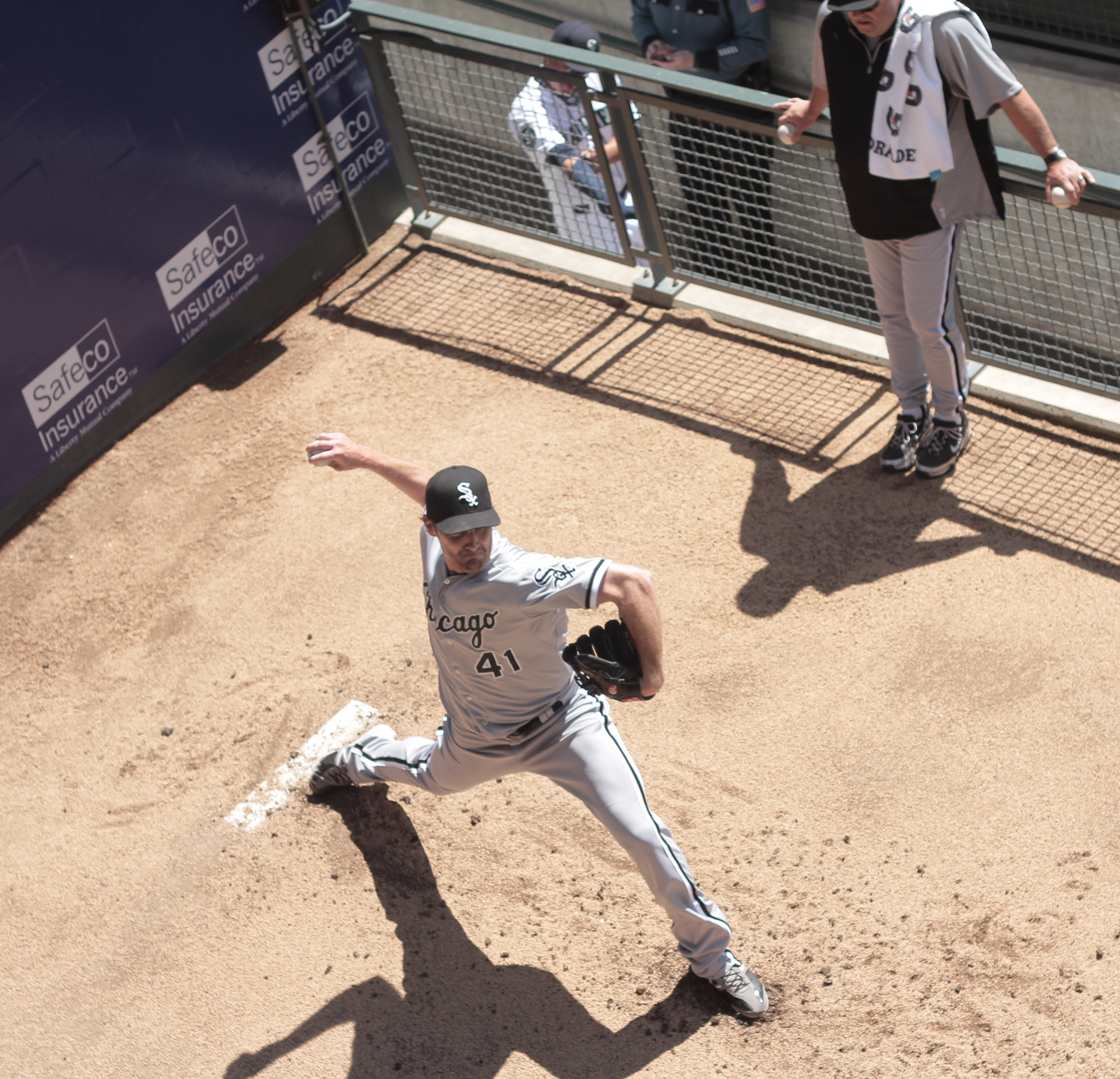
Philip Humber warms up on April 21, 2012, prior to throwing a perfect game

Humber debuted with the White Sox in their third game in relief. He made two pitches, both of which resulted in hits and base runners that came around to score. With Jake Peavy injured at the start of the 2011 season, the White Sox gave Humber the opportunity to pitch in their starting rotation. On April 9, 2011, Humber won his first start with the White Sox, pitching 6 2/3 innings and only allowing one run in a 4–2 win over the Tampa Bay Rays. Humber surprised the White Sox with his strong performance. On April 25, in the sixth start of his career, he took a no-hitter into the seventh inning against the New York Yankees at Yankee Stadium, but with one out Alex Rodriguez singled up the middle. He finished with seven scoreless innings. He took a no-hitter into the sixth inning against the Washington Nationals on June 26, but ended up earning a 2–1 loss when he surrendered a seventh inning home run to Danny Espinosa. In early July, when he led the major leagues with 103 2/3 innings pitched and held an 8–4 record with a 2.69 ERA, he seemed like a probable selection for the 2011 Major League Baseball All-Star Game. In mid-July, the White Sox switched to a six-man rotation. By early August, Humber was in a slump. Humber denies the extra rest affected his pitch command. He spent time on the disabled list with a facial bruise after Kosuke Fukudome lined a baseball into his face above the right eye on August 18. After he was hit, he was very concerned for his wife: "I thought, 'I've got to get up because she's in the stands,'" Humber said. "As soon as I went in [the clubhouse], I asked one of the guys to call her to make sure she knew I was OK.", adding "My main concern was cheering up my wife." He appeared in one rehabilitation start for the Triple-A Charlotte Knights of the International League, allowing four earned runs in five innings. Humber pitched seven scoreless innings in his major league return. Humber completed his first full season as an MLB starting pitcher with a 9–9 record with a 3.75 ERA in 28 games (26 starts). He also struck out 116 batters in 163 innings.

As Humber performed better in the first half of the 2011 season (8–5, 3.10 ERA) than in the second half (1–4, 5.01 ERA), which he attributed to general fatigue, Humber decided to add 20 pounds (9.1 kg) during his offseason workouts. Humber signed a one-year contract in March for $530,000, above the minimum salary for a player with his level of MLB experience. In the first season in which he did not have to battle for a roster spot in spring training, he made his final spring training start in his home state near Rice at Minute Maid Park in front of many relatives. Although the 2012 Chicago White Sox's rotation was said to be made up of five number-three starters, Humber began the season as the number five starter.

==== Perfect game ====
"I mean, I can’t even put it into words. I’m just so happy. There are so many good things happening right now. This just adds to the list."

— Humber after completing a perfect game on April 21, 2012

In Humber's 30th career start in MLB, he pitched the 21st perfect game in MLB history against the Seattle Mariners on April 21, 2012. It was the third perfect game in White Sox history after those thrown by Charlie Robertson and Mark Buehrle, and the 18th no-hitter in White Sox history. It was Humber's second start of the 2012 season and only career complete game.

Humber was named American League (AL) Player of the Week for the week ending April 22. Humber went 1–0 with a 0.63 ERA in 14 1/3 innings while striking out 16 over two starts that week, including the perfect game. He received a congratulatory phone call from President Barack Obama, a noted White Sox fan. Humber appeared on the Late Show with David Letterman, where he read the "Top Ten List". Humber's perfect game will be memorialized with a plaque at the National Baseball Hall of Fame and Museum.

After the perfect game, Humber struggled. He allowed 20 runs in his next three starts across 13 1/3 innings. He missed one month of the season due to a right elbow strain. Following the acquisition of Francisco Liriano, the White Sox removed Humber from the starting rotation. In 26 games (16 starts), Humber went 5–5 with a 6.44 ERA.

=== Houston Astros (2013) ===
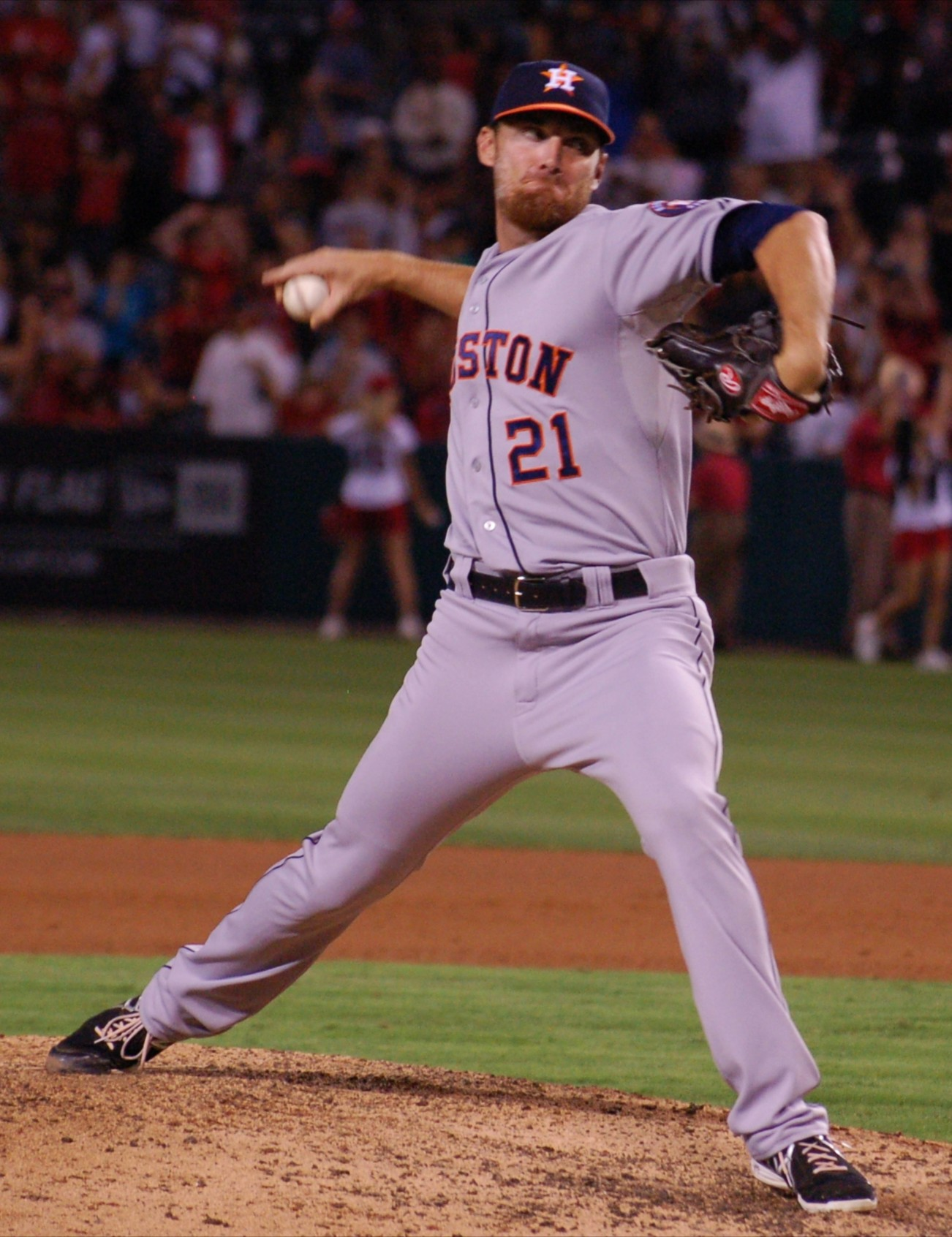
Humber pitching for the Houston Astros in 2013

On November 30, 2012, Humber was claimed off waivers by the Houston Astros. After being claimed, he signed a one-year, $800,000 contract with the Astros that included a club option for 2014. Humber made the Astros' starting rotation at the start of the 2013 season. Humber lost his spot in the starting rotation to Érik Bédard after opening the season with an 0–7 record and an ERA of 8.82. Humber was designated for assignment on May 12, after his record fell to 0–8 with a 9.59 ERA, he cleared waivers and was sent outright to Triple-A Oklahoma City RedHawks on May 14. After pitching in relief for the Oklahoma City RedHawks of the PCL, the Astros selected his contract on August 12, when they traded Wesley Wright to the Tampa Bay Rays. On October 3, the Astros declined a $3 million option for 2014, instead paying him his guaranteed $500,000 and releasing him.

=== Oakland Athletics ===
On November 2, 2013, Humber signed a minor league contract with the Oakland Athletics, with an invitation to spring training. The Athletics assigned him to the Sacramento River Cats of the PCL. He became a free agent following the season.

=== Kia Tigers ===
On December 8, 2014, Humber signed a contract with the Kia Tigers of the Korea Baseball Organization. After pitching to a 6.75 ERA in 50 2/3 innings, Humber was released by the Tigers on July 20, 2015.

=== San Diego Padres ===
On November 28, 2015, Humber signed a minor league deal with the San Diego Padres. Humber retired on March 29, 2016.

== Pitching style ==
Humber relied on five pitches. He had a four-seam fastball ranging from 89–92 miles per hour (143–148 km/h), a two-seam fastball (89–92 miles per hour (143–148 km/h)), a slider (mid 80s), a changeup (mid 80s), and a 12-6 curveball (78–81 miles per hour (126–130 km/h)). He used his slider against right-handed hitters but preferred to use his changeup and curveball as off-speed pitches against left-handed hitters. Humber favored his curveball in two-strike situations. He used a conventional "three-quarters" arm slot to deliver his pitches.

== Personal life ==
Humber married his wife, Kristan, in November 2007. They were introduced by mutual friends in 2005. At the time of his perfect game, Humber's wife was nine months pregnant with the couple's first child, a son named John Gregory, who was born on May 1. Humber comes from a large extended family.

Humber is a registered member of the Republican Party. He has the Bible verse Colossians 3:23 inscribed in his baseball glove. He undertook a charitable mission to the Philippines in the 2011–12 offseason with Brett Carroll, where they instructed children about baseball and Christianity.

Josh Tomlin, an MLB pitcher, is a close friend of Humber. From nearby Tyler, Texas, Tomlin competed against Humber in high school, and the two trained together during offseasons. Humber is currently a Tyler resident.

== See also ==
- List of Major League Baseball perfect games
- List of Rice University people

Achievements
Preceded by Roy Halladay	Perfect game pitcher April 21, 2012	Succeeded by Matt Cain
Preceded by Ervin Santana	No-hitter pitcher April 21, 2012	Succeeded by Jered Weaver
Preceded by Josh Willingham	AL Player of the Week; April 16–22, 2012	Succeeded by Paul Konerko
