= Da-Hung Cheng =

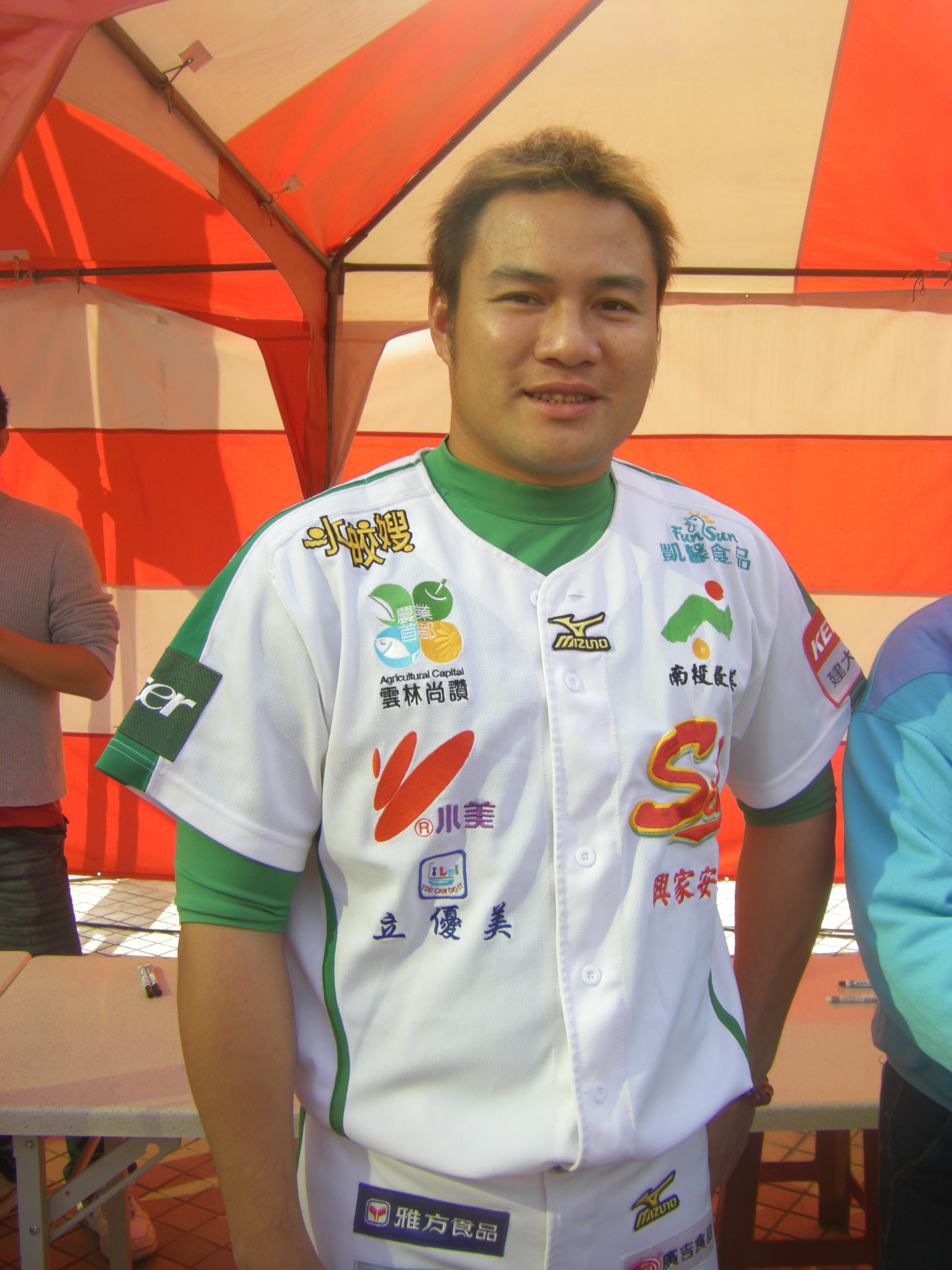

Free agent
- Catcher
- Born: 12 January 1981 (age 45); Taitung County, Taiwan
- Bats: Left Throws: Right
- Stats at Baseball Reference

Teams
- Sinon Bulls/EDA Rhinos (2005–2015); Chinatrust Brother Elephants (2016–2017)

Career highlights and awards
- CPBL Most Progressive Award (2009)

Da-Hung Cheng (Chinese: 鄭達鴻) (formerly known as Chih-Hsiung Cheng (鄭志雄)) (born 12 January 1981) is a Taiwanese baseball player who played in the Chinese Professional Baseball League.

He represented Taiwan at the 1999 World Junior Baseball Championship, 2001 World Port Tournament, 2002 World University Baseball Championship, 2013 World Baseball Classic and 2017 World Baseball Classic.

Awards
| Preceded by Liao Yu-cheng(廖于誠) | CPBL Most Progressive Award; 2009 | Succeeded by Wang Feng-hsin(王豐鑫) |
