= Extra innings =

Extended play of baseball

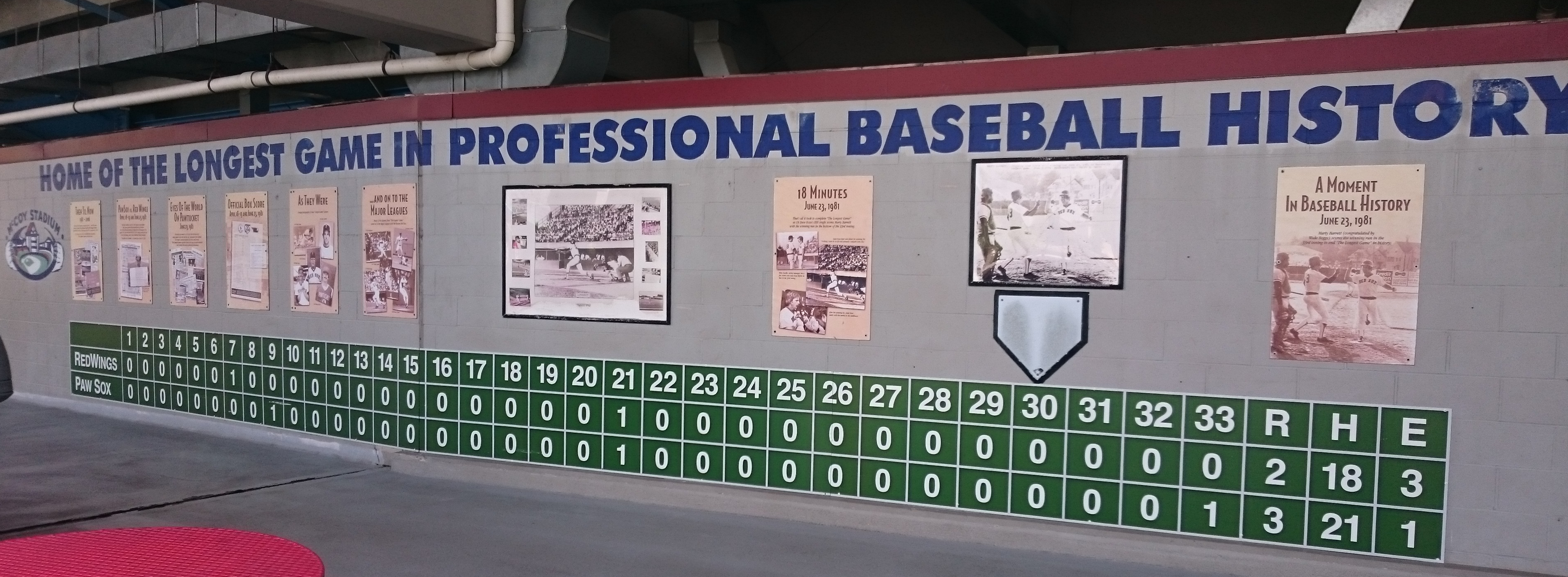
Line score of the longest professional baseball game, which lasted 24 extra innings; 33 innings total.

Extra innings is the extension of a baseball or softball game in order to break a tie.

Ordinarily, a baseball game consists of nine regulation innings (in softball and high school baseball games there are typically seven innings; in Little League Baseball, six), each of which is divided into halves: the visiting team bats first, after which the home team takes its turn at bat. However, if the score remains tied at the end of the regulation number of complete innings, the rules provide that "play shall continue until

1. The visiting team has scored more total runs than the home team at the end of a completed inning, or
2. The home team scores the winning run in an uncompleted inning."

(Since the home team bats second, condition (2) does not allow the visiting team to score more runs before the end of the inning, unless the game is called before the inning ends).

Most of the rules of the game, including the batting order, availability of substitute players and pitchers, etc., remain intact in extra innings, although occasionally leagues and tournaments will place runners on base to start extra innings in order to speed up the game. Managers must display caution to avoid exhausting all their substitute players during regular innings, in case the game reaches extensive extra innings. The rules call for a forfeiture if a team is unable to field a full team of nine players.

== Home-field advantage ==
In Major League Baseball, home teams won about 52% of extra-inning games from 1957 to 2007. During this same time period, home teams have won about 54% of all baseball games. So while the home team has some advantage in extra-inning games, this advantage is less noticeable than the initial home-field advantage. Home teams tend to have the greatest advantage in run-scoring during the first 3 innings.

For the visiting team to win, it must score as many runs as possible in the first (or "top") half of the inning and then prevent the home team from tying or taking the lead in the second (or "bottom") half. Because it bats in the bottom half of an inning, a home team wins the game by taking the lead at any point in the final inning. Normally in such a situation, the moment the winning run scores for whatever reason (base hit, sacrifice, wild pitch), the game immediately ends and no other runs are allowed. The term for winning in this scenario is a "walk-off" win (as everyone can walk off the field as soon as the winning run is scored). The exception is if the winning hit is a walk-off home run; all runners on base and the batter must circle the bases on a home run, provided that they round them all correctly, so all their runs count for the final score. Each extra inning simply repeats this scenario. This is in contrast to the analogous penalty shootout used in ice hockey or association football, where shootout goals are counted separately and only one goal is awarded to the winner (hockey), or the game is recorded as a draw and the team winning the shootout is noted separately (association football); however, the same procedure of counting runs as if they were scored in regulation is like the overtime procedures in American football, Canadian football and basketball.

== Variants ==
=== Asia ===
The East Asian professional leagues, NPB, and CPBL have a 12-inning limit before the game is declared a draw. Starting in 2025, the KBO will have an 11-inning limit on single games and the second game in a doubleheader, and a nine-inning limit in the first game of the doubleheader (no extra innings).

Additionally, NPB games have a total time limit of 210 minutes during the regular season before being counted as a tie. Postseason play has reduced the number of innings allowed. Until 1986, the Japan Series had a 270-minute (4 hours, 30 minutes) time limit. From 1987 to 1993, it was changed to 18 innings; from 1994 to 2017, it was 15 innings. In the Climax Series, and in the Japan Series since 2018, postseason play rules are the same as the regular season in 12 innings (except in 2020 and 2021, when no extra innings were played in the regular season and first two rounds of postseason, 12 inning limits were used in the Japan Series). In case of a drawn game, it is completely replayed as usual. A seven-game series can be extended to an eighth game or subsequent game, something that has happened only once (in the 1986 Japan Series). Starting in the eighth and subsequent game in the Japan Series, the 12-inning limit does not apply, and the game is continued until a winner is decided. Since 2021, a modified 12-inning limit is used in such games; beginning in the 13th inning, the two-runner WBSC tiebreaker will be implemented, similar to the current high school tournament rule. The two batters in the batting order before the player at bat will take first and second base.

Tie games are discarded when calculating winning percentages since 2002, except for 2008 when it was counted as a loss in the league's standings. From the league's formation in 1982 until 2001, they counted as half a win.

For CPBL postseason games, the 12-inning limit does not apply and the games will continue until a winner is decided. The longest game to be played took place during 2009 Taiwan Series, where in Game 6 the Brother Elephants defeated Uni-President 7-Eleven Lions 5 to 4 after 17 innings.

=== International play ===
==== Baseball ====
In the 11th inning, the manager selects anywhere in the batting order to start the inning, regardless of the last player put out. The batter immediately preceding this newly designated leadoff man becomes a runner on first base, and the next preceding batter is placed on second base. In subsequent innings, the batting order continues as normal, but the two players preceding the player scheduled to lead off (or substitutes for those players) the inning start on second and first.

This has also been adopted by European leagues Division de Honor (Spain), Italian Baseball League, and Honkbal Hoofdklasse (Netherlands).

Since the 2009 edition, a modified form of the rule has been used for the World Baseball Classic. Unlike the standard rule, the batting order may not start from a different place. Through the 2013 edition, the first inning in which teams started with runners on first and second was the 13th. The rule was not used in either the 2009 or 2013 editions because no game lasted more than 11 innings. For the 2017 World Baseball Classic, the rule was modified to use extra runners for the first time in the 11th inning, and it would see its first use in a second-round game between Japan and the Netherlands at the Tokyo Dome. Japan won that game thanks to a sacrifice bunt and a 2-run hit.

Other methods include the following:

- Putting runners on second and third (those who made the last two outs of the past inning) and an 0-2 count on the batter with no outs.
- Having bases loaded (runners being the last three outs of the past inning), with a 1-1 count on the batter and no outs.
- Sudden-death extra innings (the next team to score wins the game; this can result in a walk-off home run for the visiting team).

==== Softball ====
In international softball, a special extra innings rule starts immediately after regulation. Each team begins their half of the inning with a runner on second base (the last player to be put out). This increases the odds that teams will score and ensures a faster resolution. There is a drawback, though, in that the home team has a major advantage in batting second. Should the visiting team fail to score, all the home team must do to win is, for example, get a successful bunt and sacrifice fly to score the winning run, though a similar advantage exists in all extra-inning contests just not to that extent. This rule is also used in certain NCAA college conferences, usually applied after one or two extra innings where the "international tiebreaker" is not used.

=== Major League Baseball ===
==== Spring training ====
During spring training in Major League Baseball (MLB), most games are played for the regulation nine innings only; if the game is tied after nine innings, the game is over and the tie stands. There are multiple reasons for this brevity. Players are getting back into shape after the off-season, so shorter games help reduce injuries from overexertion. During spring training, teams often travel on a daily basis, so they need time to be able to travel to their next game. Lastly, there are no prizes or penalties associated with a team's preseason record, so there is no need for a definitive winner in each game.

However, there have still been extra inning games in spring training, with the most recent one being on March 30, 2022, with the Houston Astros beating the New York Mets 5–3 in 10 innings. Usually if extra innings are played, the game will be called after the 10th inning for the above-mentioned reasons.

==== Regular season ====
In 2020, MLB implemented the WBSC softball version of the extra innings rule where each half-inning during extra innings is started with a runner on second base. As with the earlier WBSC rule, the objective is to increase scoring opportunities and shorten extra inning games. The batting order does not change, as the runner placed on second base is normally the player who, in the batting order, immediately precedes the batter leading off the inning. On July 24, 2020, the Oakland Athletics defeated the Los Angeles Angels, 7–3, in the first MLB extra-inning game played using this rule. The rule increased the percentage of extra inning games ending in the 10th inning from 43.9% during the 2019 season to 69.1% during the 2020 season. The rule was later extended into the 2021 and 2022 seasons and was made permanent beginning with the 2023 season.

The ghost runner is also referred to as the "Manfred Man," an allusion to the rule having been implemented during Commissioner Rob Manfred's tenure, and a play on the name of the British musician Manfred Mann. However, the rule is based on the international rule for tournaments, which has been used as early as 2008.

==== Postseason ====
Extra runners are not used in MLB postseason games. Postseason games that last beyond nine innings begin all extra innings without any runner being placed on base.

== Longest games ==
=== Professional ===
There are nine regulation innings in a professional baseball game.

==== Minor League Baseball ====
The record for the most innings played in a single professional game is 33, which occurred in 1981 in a Minor League Baseball game between the Pawtucket Red Sox and the Rochester Red Wings, at the time the Triple-A affiliates of the Boston Red Sox and the Baltimore Orioles, respectively.

Each team had a future Hall of Famer on its roster: Wade Boggs for Pawtucket and Cal Ripken Jr. for Rochester.

==== Major League Baseball ====
The longest game by innings in Major League Baseball was a 1–1 tie in the National League between the Boston Braves and the Brooklyn Robins in 26 innings, at Braves Field in Boston on May 1, 1920. It had become too dark to see the ball (fields did not have lights yet and the sun was setting), and the game was considered a draw. Played rapidly by modern standards, those 26 innings were completed in 3 hours and 50 minutes. As was the custom, the first pitch was thrown at 3:00 p.m., home plate umpire Barry McCormick called the game as lights began appearing in the windows of buildings across the Charles River, just before 7:00 p.m.

The longest American League game, and tied for the longest major league game by innings which ended with one team winning, was a 7–6 victory by the Chicago White Sox over the Milwaukee Brewers in 25 innings, at Comiskey Park in Chicago in 1984. The game began at 7:30 p.m. on May 8, 1984, and after scoring early runs both teams scored twice in the 8th inning; but the game was suspended after 17 innings with the score tied 3–3 due to a league curfew rule prohibiting an inning from beginning after 12:59 a.m. The game was continued the following evening, May 9, 1984, and both teams scored three times in the 21st inning to make the score 6–6; finally, in the bottom of the 25th, the White Sox' Harold Baines hit a walk-off home run to end the contest. Tom Seaver was the winning pitcher in relief. A regularly scheduled game followed, meaning both nights saw 17 innings played; Seaver also started, and won, the second game 5–4. The official time of the entire 25-inning game was 8 hours, 6 minutes, also a major league record.

On September 12, 1974, baseball's St. Louis Cardinals won a marathon night game that had started the evening before, defeating the host New York Mets, 4 to 3, in the 25th inning after 7 hours and 4 minutes. This game is the longest National League contest to be played to a decision and is also tied with the aforementioned Brewers-White Sox game on May 8–9, 1984, for the longest game played to a decision in major league history. Two Mets errors led to the Cardinals' winning run, starting with an errant pickoff throw that allowed Bake McBride to scamper all the way around from first. The Mets went to the plate 103 times, a record in a major league game; the Cardinals were not far behind with 99 plate appearances. All told, a record 175 official at-bats were recorded, with a major-league record 45 runners stranded. Only a thousand fans were still at Shea Stadium when the game ended at 3:13 a.m. on September 12. Unlike the American League, the National League had no curfew. This was the longest game played to a decision without a suspension.

On April 15, 1968, the Houston Astros defeated the Mets 1–0 in a 24-inning game at the Houston Astrodome. The 6-hour, 6-minute contest, which ended with the Astros' Bob Aspromonte hitting a grounder through the legs of Mets shortstop Al Weis in the bottom of the 24th, remains the longest shutout game in major league history.

The longest American League game to end in a tie was a 24-inning contest between the Detroit Tigers and Philadelphia Athletics on July 21, 1945. The teams were tied 1–1 when the game was called due to darkness at Shibe Park; the Tigers' Les Mueller had pitched a record 19 2/3 innings, giving up one run before being taken out in the 20th inning.

The longest game to end in a scoreless tie was a National League contest between the Cincinnati Reds and Brooklyn Dodgers on September 11, 1946. The teams went 19 innings before darkness fell at Brooklyn's Ebbets Field, forcing the game to be called on account of darkness. In the American League, the longest 0–0 game was played between the Washington Senators and Detroit Tigers on July 16, 1909. The game was called after 18 innings due to darkness at Bennett Park in Detroit. The longest scoreless period within a completed game came in the April 15, 1968 game between the Astros and Mets which remained scoreless after 23 innings.

The Washington Senators became the first team in Major League history to play multiple games of at least 20 innings in a season when they defeated the Minnesota Twins 9–7 in 20 innings on August 9, 1967, after winning a 22-inning game over the Chicago White Sox on June 12 of that year. This feat would later be accomplished by the 1971 Oakland Athletics who had games of 21 and 20 innings and the 1989 Los Angeles Dodgers who played two 22-inning contests.

The longest doubleheader in Major League history was on May 31, 1964. The San Francisco Giants beat the New York Mets 5–3 in nine innings in the day's first game at Shea Stadium, and then won the nightcap 8–6 after 23 innings. The two games lasted a combined nine hours, 52 minutes. The Mets' Ed Kranepool played in all 32 innings of the two games; Kranepool had been called up to the team that day after having played in both games of a doubleheader the day before for their Triple-A club in Buffalo.

On April 5, 2012, the Toronto Blue Jays beat the Cleveland Indians 7–4 in 16 innings. The five-hour, 14-minute game was the longest Opening Day game in Major League history.

On June 8, 2013, the Toronto Blue Jays beat the Texas Rangers 4–3 in 18 innings while the Miami Marlins beat the New York Mets 2–1 in 20 innings. This was the second time in Major League history that two games of 18 innings or more were played on same day; the first was August 15, 2006.

In the 2013 season, the Arizona Diamondbacks set a major league record by playing 78 extra innings. This broke the season record of 76 extra innings played by the Minnesota Twins in 1969.

In the 2020 season, and later extended into 2021 and 2022 before being made permanent in 2023, a new rule was added, adding a runner on second to begin each extra inning. The longest game played under these rules was a 16-inning game on August 25, 2021, between the Los Angeles Dodgers and San Diego Padres in San Diego where the Dodgers won 5–3 after both teams entered extra innings tied at 1 and traded two runs each in the 15th inning.

==== Notable postseason extra-inning games ====
In October 1999, in the "Grand Single" game 5 of the 1999 NLCS, with the bases loaded in the bottom of the 15th inning, Robin Ventura of the New York Mets, who had hit two grand slam home runs in one game during the regular season, hit the ball over the outfield fence for, apparently, another grand slam. He celebrated with his teammates and did not advance to second base. According to the rules, only one run scored, giving the Mets a 4–3 win over the Atlanta Braves.

The longest postseason game by innings in MLB history is 18 innings; this has occurred in five games, all of which were decided by a solo home run. Four of the five 18 inning games involve either the Houston Astros or the Los Angeles Dodgers.

The first 18-inning contest was played between the Atlanta Braves and the Houston Astros on October 9, 2005. In Game 4 of a National League Division Series in Houston, the Braves (who were trailing the series 2–1 and facing elimination) took a 6–1 lead into the 8th inning. A grand slam by Lance Berkman in the bottom of the 8th brought the score to 6–5, and with two outs in the bottom of the 9th, Brad Ausmus homered to tie the game and send it to extra innings. The score remained deadlocked at 6–6 until the 18th, when the Astros' Chris Burke (who entered the game in the 9th inning as a pinch runner) hit a walk-off home run to left to win it, sending Houston to the NLCS. Roger Clemens, who was brought in to pinch-hit in the 15th and pitched the last three innings in relief, was credited as the winning pitcher in the 5-hour, 50-minute contest. Adam LaRoche and Tim Hudson played in both of the first two 18-inning games. This one as Atlanta Braves and the second one as opposing sides of one another with Hudson pitching in both games as the visiting team's starting pitcher.

The second 18-inning game was Game 2 of the 2014 National League Division Series, when the visiting San Francisco Giants defeated the Washington Nationals 2–1. The game ended just after midnight on October 5, 2014, and lasted 6 hours 23 minutes. The Nationals had been leading 1–0 with two out in the ninth inning, with starter Jordan Zimmermann one out away from a complete-game shutout. Following a decision by manager Matt Williams to remove Zimmermann with two out after he walked Joe Panik, Washington closer Drew Storen gave up a single to Giants catcher Buster Posey and an RBI double to Pablo Sandoval, scoring Panik to tie the game 1–1. Posey was thrown out at the plate trying to score the second San Francisco run on Sandoval's double. After Sergio Romo retired the Nationals in order in the bottom half, the game went into extra innings. There was no further scoring until Giants first baseman Brandon Belt led off the top of the 18th inning with a home run. Hunter Strickland, a September call-up, recorded the save. Until 2022, this was the only one to go the full 18 innings.

The third 18-inning game was Game 3 of the 2018 World Series. It was played on October 26, 2018, between the Boston Red Sox and Los Angeles Dodgers at Dodger Stadium. The Dodgers took a 1–0 lead in the 3rd inning when Joc Pederson homered off of Boston starter Rick Porcello. The Red Sox tied the game in the top of the 8th when Jackie Bradley Jr. hit a solo home run off of Dodgers closer Kenley Jansen. The game remained deadlocked at 1 until the 13th inning when Brock Holt scored on a throwing error by Dodgers reliever Scott Alexander. The Dodgers subsequently tied it again at 2 in the bottom of the inning, when Max Muncy scored on a throwing error by Red Sox second baseman Ian Kinsler (who had entered the game in the 10th inning as a pinch runner). The score remained 2–2 until the bottom of the 18th, when Muncy (who had missed a walk-off home run in the 15th inning by mere inches) hit a walk-off solo home run off of Red Sox pitcher Nathan Eovaldi (who was in his 7th inning of relief). The winning pitcher for the Dodgers was Alex Wood. With a duration of 7 hours and 20 minutes, this was also the longest postseason game by time in MLB history.

The fourth 18-inning game was Game 3 of the 2022 American League Division Series. It was played on October 15, 2022, between the Houston Astros and Seattle Mariners at T-Mobile Park. The Astros took a 1–0 lead in the top of the 18th inning on a home run by shortstop Jeremy Peña. The Mariners went 1-2-3 in the bottom half of the 18th, allowing a 3-game sweep by the Astros to advance to the American League Championship Series, and it took 6 hours, 22 minutes to finish the longest shutout game in postseason history. The 17 scoreless innings in a game set a new Major League postseason record.

The fifth and most recent 18-inning game was Game 3 of the 2025 World Series between the Toronto Blue Jays and the Los Angeles Dodgers at Dodger Stadium on October 27, 2025. Freddie Freeman hit a walk-off solo shot off Brendon Little to end the 6 hour, 39 minute contest with a 6-5 Los Angeles victory.

The 1986 National League Championship Series was notable for its two climactic extra-inning games. After the Houston Astros and the New York Mets split the first four games of the series, the Mets won Game 5 in 12 innings and Game 6 in 16 innings to claim the pennant.

The 1986 American League Championship Series between the Boston Red Sox and the California Angels featured a dramatic game where the Angels were leading 3 games to 1 and leading 5–4 in game 5, one strike away from the first pennant in franchise history, only for Red Sox's Dave Henderson hit a two-run home run off Angels closer Donnie Moore in the top of the ninth inning to give the Red Sox the lead. The Angels tied it in the bottom half but in the top of the 11th, Henderson's sacrifice fly off Moore proved to be the winning margin and the Angels lost the game. The series returned to Boston and the Angels were outscored a combined 18–5 in games 6 and 7 to lose the pennant.

Game 6 of the 1986 World Series between the New York Mets and Boston Red Sox went into extra innings as well. The Red Sox scored 2 runs in the top of the 10th inning to take a 5–3 lead and then got two quick outs with no one on base in the bottom of the 10th. With the Red Sox one out away from their first world championship in 68 years, reliever Calvin Schiraldi gave up three straight singles (to Gary Carter, Kevin Mitchell, and Ray Knight), with Carter scoring on Knight's single to cut the lead to one run with runners on first and third. Red Sox manager John McNamara replaced Schiraldi with Bob Stanley, who then threw a two-strike wild pitch to Mookie Wilson to allow Mitchell to score the tying run and move Knight to second base. The wild pitch was particularly notable in that it completely turned the tables on the Red Sox from what they had done while facing the Angels weeks earlier, as they themselves had now blown a situation in which they were one strike away from winning the series. Wilson subsequently hit a ground ball to first base that rolled through the legs of first baseman Bill Buckner, allowing Knight to score the winning run from second base and sending the Series to a Game 7 where the Mets completed the comeback. Had Buckner not committed this error, the game would have either remained tied with runners on first and third for the next batter (if Wilson was safe) or would have gone to an 11th inning (if Wilson had been out).

The 1980 National League Championship Series, played between the Houston Astros and the Philadelphia Phillies, had four of its five games go to extra innings. The Astros won Games 2 and 3 in 10 and 11 innings respectively, while the Phillies took Games 4 and 5 in 10 innings each.

Game 6 of the 2011 World Series invokes echoes of 1986. In the bottom of the 9th inning, the Texas Rangers were one strike away from winning their first World Series when David Freese hit a two-run triple to tie the game 7–7 and send the game to extra innings. In the 10th, Josh Hamilton hit a two-run home run to give the Rangers a 9–7 lead, but the Cardinals responded with two runs to tie the game again at 9. The game ended in the 11th inning when Freese led off with a walk-off solo home run. Just like the Mets did in 1986, the Cardinals went on to win Game 7 and the championship.

The 2012 American League Division Series between the Baltimore Orioles and the New York Yankees had back-to-back extra-inning games, going 12 and 13 innings respectively. The Yankees won Game 3 on a walk-off home run by Raúl Ibañez and the Orioles returned the favor the next night by winning Game 4.

In the 1995 American League Division Series, the Seattle Mariners and Yankees battled in Game 2 in 15 innings. The Yankees won the game on a two-run walk-off home run by Jim Leyritz, setting the record for longest game in MLB postseason history by time until 2005. In Game 5, the Mariners won the game and the series in 11 innings on Edgar Martínez's famous double that scored Ken Griffey Jr. Until 2011, this was the only LDS game 5 in either league to go into extra innings.

The 2014 American League Wild Card Game featured the first extra-inning game in its third year of postseason existence, won by the Kansas City Royals over the Oakland Athletics in 12 innings.

The longest Game 7 in postseason history was during the 1924 World Series where the Washington Senators beat the New York Giants 4–3 in 12 innings to claim the title.

The longest "winner take all" game (defined as the final game of a postseason series, in which the winning team clinches the title or advances to the next round while the loser is eliminated from the postseason) in MLB postseason history is the 2025 American League Division Series Game 5 (best-of-5 series), won by the Seattle Mariners over the Detroit Tigers 3–2 in 15 innings.

===== World Series =====
Over the history of the World Series, 69 games have gone to extra innings, setting the following innings-related records.

- Most extra innings played in a World Series game: 9 (2018, game 3), (2025, game 3). Further, game 3 of 2018 was the longest World Series game played in terms of elapsed time.
- Most extra innings played over the course of a World Series: 11 (2025). The previous record was tied by the large number of extra innings in 2025's game 3 alone, and exceeded by extra innings in game 7.
- Most innings played over the course of a World Series: 75 (1912). 1912 was one of seven historically unusual Series: four (1903, 1919, 1920, 1921) were best-of-nine contests, and three (1907, 1912, 1922) were best-of-seven contests which each had one tie game apiece. In the 1912 Series, game 2 concluded as an 11-inning tie and the Series-deciding game 8 went for 10 innings, padding the Series' total inning count to 75.
- Most innings played over the course of a standard World Series: 74 (2025). "Standard" denotes best-of-seven Series which had no tie games, excluding the seven above Series.
- Most games running to extra innings, played over the course of a World Series: 3 (1991). No other Series has had more than two games running to extra innings.

Additionally, World Series-deciding games have gone to extra innings 11 times: 1912's game 8, 1924's game 7, 1933's game 5, 1939's game 4, 1991's game 7, 1992's game 6, 1997's game 7, 2012's game 4, 2015's game 5, 2016's game 7, and 2025's game 7.

==== All-Star Game ====
The longest major league All-Star Game by time was played on July 15, 2008, at Yankee Stadium, with the American League winning 4–3 in 15 innings after four hours, 50 minutes. Michael Young hit the walk-off sacrifice fly to win it. This was the first time in All-Star game history that the AL won an All-Star Game in extra innings. The previous nine times the National League went 8–0–1 in extra-inning games.

The All-Star Game of July 11, 1967, at Anaheim Stadium also lasted 15 innings, but was considerably shorter in terms of elapsed time. The All-Star Game of July 9, 2002, at Miller Park was controversially declared a 7–7 tie after 11 innings, when both teams ran out of available pitchers.

Since the 2022 All-Star Game, if the All-Star Game is tied after nine innings, the winner will be decided by a home run derby rather than with extra innings. Despite the association with the All-Star Game, this is distinct from the annual home run derby held every year the day before the All-Star Game. The rules differ somewhat from the regular home run derby, with each manager selecting three players to make three swings each to hit as many home runs as possible. If a tie remains, sudden death triple-swing rounds will be played until one team outslugs the other. The winning team will be credited with a run and a hit.

==== Japan Series ====
On November 6, 2010, the record for longest Japan Series game was set in Game 6. The Chiba Lotte Marines and the Chunichi Dragons played 15 innings totaling 5 hours and 43 minutes. The game ended a 2–2 tie leading to a Game 7 in which the Marines won the game and the championship.

==== Taiwan Series ====
The longest game in Taiwan Series's history took place in Game 6 on October 24, 2009. The Brother Elephants defeated the Uni-President 7-Eleven Lions 5 to 4 and tied the series 3–3 after 17 innings that totals 6 hours 14 minutes. The Lions eventually took the title after defeating the Elephants 5 to 2 in Game 7.

=== College baseball ===
The longest college baseball game was played between Texas and Boston College on May 30, 2009, in a regional NCAA Division I Baseball Championship tournament game at Austin, Texas. Texas won the game, 3–2, in 25 innings as the visiting team under NCAA tournament rules on home-team declaration during a tournament. The game lasted seven hours and three minutes. Three years later, another NCAA tournament game passed the 20-inning mark when Kent State defeated Kentucky, 7–6, in 21 innings in an opening-round game at the Gary Regional in Gary, Indiana.

Saturday, May 30, 2009 6:02 pm (CDT) at UFCU Disch–Falk Field in Austin, Texas
Team	1	2	3	4	5	6	7	8	9	10	11	12	13	14	15	16	17	18	19	20	21	22	23	24	25	R	H	E
Texas Longhorns	0	2	0	0	0	0	0	0	0	0	0	0	0	0	0	0	0	0	0	0	0	0	0	0	1	3	20	3
Boston College Eagles	0	0	0	1	0	1	0	0	0	0	0	0	0	0	0	0	0	0	0	0	0	0	0	0	0	2	8	0
WP: Austin Dicharry (8–2) LP: Mike Dennhardt (5–2); Home runs: TEX: Kevin Keyes (5); BC: None; Attendance: 7,104; Umpires: Phil Benson, Bill Speck, Mark Ditsworth, Darrell Arnold; Notes: Duration: 7:03; Boxscore

== Other records ==
The 1943 Boston Red Sox played an MLB record 31 extra inning games, winning 15 and losing 14, with 2 games tied. They played 73 extra innings that season, equivalent to playing an additional eight nine-inning games. The fewest extra inning games played in a season (dating back to at least 1908) is one, by the 2020 St. Louis Cardinals, who played only 58 games in a season shortened by the COVID-19 pandemic. The 2016 Los Angeles Angels played four extra inning games, the fewest in a 162-game season, and lost all four. The record for most extra inning victories in a season is held by the 1959 Pittsburgh Pirates, who won 19 of their 21 extra inning games (one of the two losses came vs. the Milwaukee Braves in the bottom of the 13th at County Stadium after Harvey Haddix pitched 12 perfect innings).

The convention of the visiting team batting first means that there is no limit to the possible margin of victory for the visitors in extra innings. The MLB record is held by the 1983 Texas Rangers, who put up 12 unanswered runs in the top of the 15th inning to defeat the Oakland Athletics by a score of 16–4 on July 3. Conversely, for the home team who bats second, the highest possible margin of victory is four.

== See also ==
- Overtime (sports)
- Longest professional baseball game
