= Luther Hackman =

American baseball player (born 1974)

- Pitcher
- Born: October 10, 1974 (age 51); Columbus, Mississippi, U.S.
- Batted: Right Threw: Right

MLB debut
- September 1, 1999, for the Colorado Rockies

Last MLB appearance
- September 27, 2003, for the San Diego Padres

MLB statistics
- Win–loss record: 9–10
- Earned run average: 5.09
- Strikeouts: 128

KBO statistics
- Win–loss record: 3–6
- Earned run average: 4.80
- Strikeouts: 57

CPBL statistics
- Win–loss record: 14–12
- Earned run average: 2.97
- Strikeouts: 160
- Stats at Baseball Reference

Teams
- Colorado Rockies (1999); St. Louis Cardinals (2000–2002); San Diego Padres (2003); Samsung Lions (2005); Uni-President 7-Eleven Lions (2008–2010)

Career highlights and awards
- 2x Taiwan Series champion (2008–2009); Taiwan Series MVP (2009)

Luther Gean Hackman (born October 10, 1974) is an American former professional baseball pitcher. He played in Major League Baseball (MLB) for the Colorado Rockies, St. Louis Cardinals, and San Diego Padres, in the KBO League for the Samsung Lions, and in the Chinese Professional Baseball League (CPBL) for the Uni-President 7-Eleven Lions.

== Career ==
Hackman was selected by Colorado Rockies in 6th round (154th overall) of the 1994 Major League Baseball draft. He has played at the major league level for the Colorado Rockies, St. Louis Cardinals, and San Diego Padres.

In 2007, Hackman played nearly all of the season with the Nashville Sounds, the Triple-A affiliate of the Milwaukee Brewers. He was released from his contract on August 18, and then signed as a free agent by the Triple-A Oklahoma Redhawks on August 24.

In late October 2007, Hackman was given a 50-game suspension for violating the Minor League Drug Prevention and Treatment Program by testing positive for a performance-enhancing substance.

He signed with Uni-President 7-Eleven Lions of the Taiwanese Chinese Professional Baseball League on July 1, 2008 and became a free agent at the end of the season. Then he joined with Olmecas de Tabasco of the Liga Mexicana de Béisbol in the beginning of 2009 until June 10, 2009.

After June 16, 2009, Hackman returned to the Uni-President 7-Eleven Lions wearing #00 and was named the Most Valuable Player in the 2009 Taiwan Series.

On August 14, 2010, Hackman was warned then later ejected by home plate umpire for repeatedly covering the pitching rubber with dirt.

== Personal life ==
On March 9, 2023, Hackman pleaded guilty in the United States District Court for the Western District of Tennessee to money laundering and conspiring to distribute cocaine.

His son, LJ, played NJCAA basketball at Jones College.
