= Chin-Hui Tsao =

Taiwanese baseball player (born 1981)

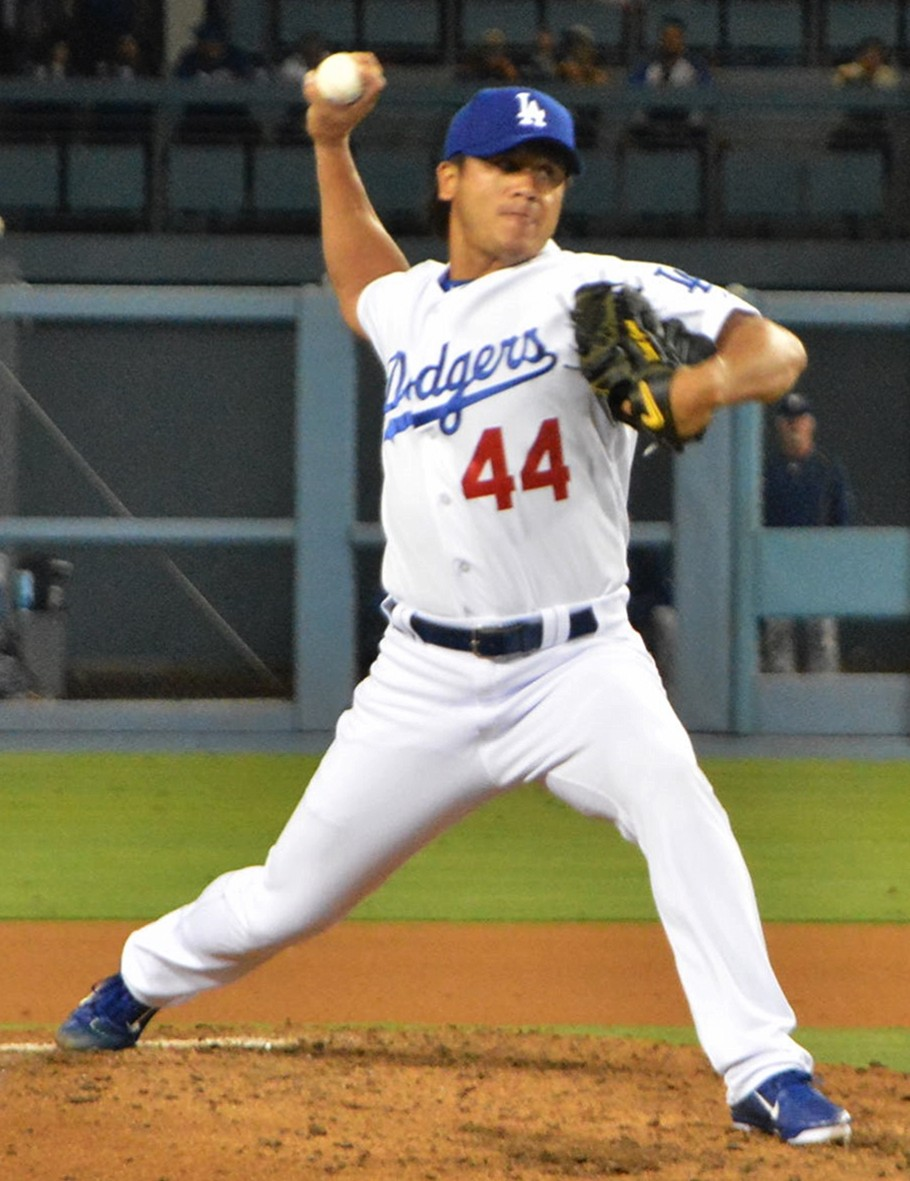
- Tsao pitching for the Los Angeles Dodgers in 2015
- Pitcher
- Born: June 2, 1981 (age 45); Guangfu, Hualien, Taiwan
- Batted: Right Threw: Right

Professional debut
- MLB: July 25, 2003, for the Colorado Rockies
- CPBL: April 25, 2009, for the Brother Elephants

Last appearance
- MLB: May 21, 2016, for the Los Angeles Dodgers
- CPBL: October 3, 2009, for the Brother Elephants

MLB statistics
- Win–loss record: 5–6
- Earned run average: 5.75
- Strikeouts: 67
- Stats at Baseball Reference

Teams
- Kaoping Fala (1999); Colorado Rockies (2003–2005); Los Angeles Dodgers (2007); Brother Elephants (2009); Los Angeles Dodgers (2015–2016); Fuzhou Sea Knights (2026–present)

Chin-hui Tsao
- Traditional Chinese: 曹錦輝
- Simplified Chinese: 曹锦辉
Transcriptions
Standard Mandarin
- Hanyu Pinyin: Cáo Jǐnhūi
- Wade–Giles: Ts'ao Chin-Hui
- IPA: [tsʰǎʊ tɕínxwéɪ]

Chin-Hui Tsao (Chinese: 曹錦輝; pinyin: Cáo Jǐnhūi; born June 2, 1981) is a Taiwanese professional baseball pitcher for the Fuzhou Sea Knights of Chinese Professional Baseball. He is the second major league player, and the first major league pitcher from Taiwan. Like the first Taiwanese major league player, former Los Angeles Dodgers outfielder Chin-Feng Chen, he is a Taiwanese aborigine of Amis ancestry. He had previously played in Major League Baseball (MLB) for the Colorado Rockies and Dodgers before spending the 2009 season with the Brother Elephants in the Chinese Professional Baseball League (CPBL). After the 2009 Taiwan Series, Tsao was investigated for game-fixing scandals, although he was ultimately not indicted on February 10, 2010. Tsao was expelled by CPBL on December 23, 2009. He has recorded the fastest pitch by a Taiwanese pitcher at 100 miles per hour (160 km/h) in 2005.

== Professional baseball ==
=== Colorado Rockies ===
After graduating from high school in the summer of 1999, Tsao briefly played for Taiwan Major League's Kaoping Fala before he was signed as an undrafted free agent by the Colorado Rockies on October 19, 1999. Tsao pitched in the Rockies' farm system for the Asheville Tourists in 2000, starting 24 games and accumulating a record of 11–8 with a 2.73 ERA with a whopping 187 strikeouts against only 40 walks. He was selected as Baseball America's 2nd team Minor League All-Star, Low A All-Star, Colorado Rockies Minor League Player of the Year, South Atlantic League All-Star, and South Atlantic League Most Valuable Pitcher.

He played in only four games in 2001 for High A Salem before undergoing reconstructive right elbow surgery on May 23. He rejoined the team late in the 2002 season and made 9 starts (4–2, 2.09).

Finally healthy, he started 2003 for Double-A Tulsa, compiling an 11–4 record with a 2.46 era in 18 starts, striking out 125 against only 26 walks. He earned a spot on the Double-A All-Star team and was a Texas League All-Star.

Tsao made his major league debut for the Rockies against the Milwaukee Brewers on July 25, 2003, as a starter. He worked 6.1 innings, allowed 3 runs, struck out 5 and walked one as he picked up his first victory in the Rockies 7–3 win. He was the first Taiwanese pitcher to ever compete in a Major League game when he took the mound that night. Tsao made history on August 18, 2003, when he became the first Taiwanese player to get a hit, and he was also the only Rockies player to get a hit, spoiling the no-hitter bid of Steve Trachsel.

Injuries and his commitment to the Chinese Taipei Olympic team limited him to just 10 appearances in the Rockies bullpen in 2004, but he earned his first professional save on September 29, pitching a 1-2-3 ninth inning against the Los Angeles Dodgers.

The Rockies intended to make him their regular closer for the 2005 season, but Tsao was sidelined by a pair of right shoulder injuries that eventually required season-ending surgery. His recovery from the surgery (for a torn labrum and a debridement of the right rotator cuff) caused him to miss the entire 2006 season and led to the Rockies letting him leave as a free agent following the season. He recorded a career-high 100 mph when he worked in relief in 2005.

=== Los Angeles Dodgers ===
Tsao was picked up by the Los Angeles Dodgers and invited to compete for a roster spot out of the bullpen. He earned a spot and pitched 10 1/3 scoreless innings before faltering and allowing 5 runs in 2/3 of an inning on May 6.

He suffered from injury problems again during the 2007 season, missing the second half of the season due to injury. After the season, the Dodgers optioned him to the minors, but he refused the assignment and became a free agent.

=== Kansas City Royals ===
Tsao signed with the Kansas City Royals for the 2008 season with a minor league contract and invitation to spring training to compete for a spot in the bullpen and rotation, but did not make the team and started the season in Triple-A. On June 3, 2008, Tsao was released by the Royals. Tsao later returned to Taiwan to join the Chinese Taipei national baseball team for the 2008 Olympics. In this tournament Tsao only pitched 1.2 inning and achieved an unsatisfactory 10.8 ERA.

=== Brother Elephants ===
On December 31, 2008, Tsao was drafted by the Brother Elephants in the Chinese Professional Baseball League (CPBL) annual draft as the first-round 2nd overall pick. On March 23, 2009, he signed with the team with NT$ 350,000(ca. USD 11,000) monthly salary, but without signing bonus. In the whole 2009 CPBL season Tsao achieved an 8-win, 8-loss, 3.939 ERA, 1.33 WHIP record in his 93.2 inning pitching. Tsao was the losing pitcher in the final 7th match in the 2009 Taiwan Series.

After the 2009 Taiwan Series Tsao had been under investigation for game fixing allegations. On February 10, 2010, the Banciao District Prosecutors' Office announced that during the 2009 CPBL season Tsao had been accepting unsuitable benefits, including wine and sex, from the mafia and therefore had allegedly agreed to throw two CPBL games in August 2009 for them. However, one game was cancelled due to Typhoon Morakot while Tsao declined the other game when not enough of his teammates agreed to go along. Tsao was ultimately not indicted but was still expelled by the Brother Elephants due to misbehavior, ending his baseball career in Taiwan.

=== Attempted comeback ===
Throughout 2010 Tsao attempted to join several independent baseball league teams in the United States but was rejected repeatedly. Between December 2010 and November 2012 Tsao ran a barbecue restaurant in Hualien City along with his former Brother Elephants teammate Chen Chih-yuan who was also expelled by CPBL due to game-fixing allegations. In November 2012 Tsao withdrew his barbecue restaurant shares to open his own beef noodle soup restaurant in Hualien City alongside his then girlfriend, surnamed Pan.

In April 2014 Pan told Apple Daily Taiwan that by the end of 2013 Tsao embezzled some NT$1.6 million (ca. USD 50,000) from her and the restaurant. Tsao then fled with his new girlfriend and disappeared from the restaurant ever since. Tsao denied any wrongdoing in a pre-recorded video, but did not show up publicly. Pan sued Tsao and the lawsuits remain unsettled. Their restaurant closed down in July 2014.

Tsao attempted a return to professional baseball in December 2014, signing with the Adelaide Bite of the Australian Baseball League, partway through the 2014–15 season. However, the Australian Baseball League suspended Tsao upon his arrival in Adelaide, after discussions with CPBL and MLB officials.

=== Return to the Los Angeles Dodgers ===
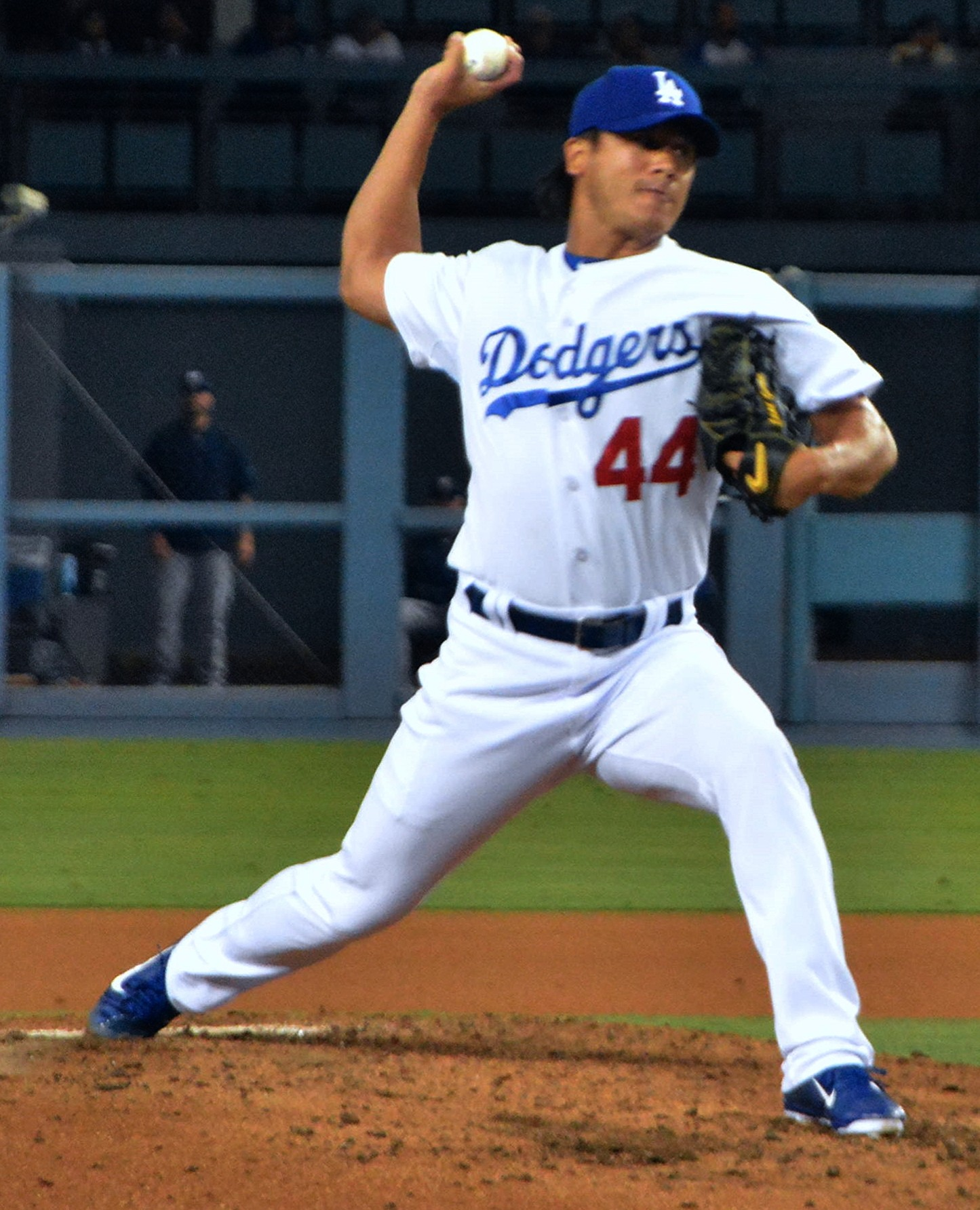
Tsao pitching for the Los Angeles Dodgers in 2015

On December 31, 2014, Tsao signed a minor league contract with the Los Angeles Dodgers that included an invitation to spring training. He was assigned to the AA Tulsa Drillers to start the season but was promoted to the AAA Oklahoma City Dodgers. He was called up to the major league team on July 8, 2015, eight years after his last MLB appearance.

Tsao was called up by the Dodgers in June 2015, 8 years since his last appearance in the Majors. On July 10, Tsao pitched a scoreless seventh inning in a game against the Milwaukee Brewers, his first major league outing since July 14, 2007. Due to the Dodgers' rally in the bottom of the inning, Tsao picked up his first major league win since May 11, 2005, when he was with the Colorado Rockies. He was the first pitcher since Johnny Lindell in 1953 to have a gap of more than ten years between major league wins. Tsao was the 18th different Dodgers pitcher to pitch in relief in the 2015 season. He pitched in five games for the Dodgers, allowing nine runs on 15 hits in seven innings. He was optioned back to AAA on July 26 and designated for assignment on July 30. He remained in Oklahoma City for the rest of the season, where he was 2–1 with a 2.77 ERA in 30 games with seven saves. In February 2016, he signed a new minor league contract with the Dodgers. He began the season with Oklahoma City, where he had a 3.31 ERA in 17 games. On May 19, he was added to the Dodgers major league roster. He appeared in two games for the Dodgers, on May 19 and May 21, working 1 2/3 innings, walking three and allowing one run to score. After the second game, he was placed on the disabled list with a strained right triceps and remained there the rest of the season. On November 9, Tsao was outrighted off the 40-man roster and he elected to become a free agent.

=== Long Island Ducks ===
On February 8, 2017, Tsao signed with the Long Island Ducks, an independent team in the Atlantic League of Professional Baseball. He announced his retirement on June 19, 2017.

=== Fuzhou Sea Knights ===
In 2026, Tsao signed with the Fuzhou Sea Knights of Chinese Professional Baseball.

== International career ==
Tsao pitched for his country in five major international competitions, including the Junior World Championships (1996–1997, 1999), the 1999 Asian Baseball Championship, and the 2004 and 2008 Summer Olympics. In the two Olympics appearances, Tsao went 0–1 with a 1.93 ERA and one save. At the 1999 Asia Cup, he dominated: making three appearances (11 innings, 3 hits, 0 runs, 1 walk, 19 strikeouts), fanning 15 batters in his one start against China.

In the 2004 Olympics at Athens, he was clocked at 159 km/h (99 mph).

== See also ==
- List of Major League Baseball players from Taiwan
