= José Canó =

Dominican baseball player (born 1962)

- Pitcher
- Born: March 7, 1962 (age 63); Boca del Soco, Dominican Republic
- Batted: Right Threw: Right

Professional debut
- MLB: August 28, 1989, for the Houston Astros
- CPBL: September 16, 1992, for the Uni-President Lions

Last appearance
- MLB: September 30, 1989, for the Houston Astros
- CPBL: July 9, 1999, for the Wei Chuan Dragons

MLB statistics
- Win–loss record: 1–1
- Earned run average: 5.09
- Strikeouts: 8

CPBL statistics
- Win–loss record: 25–25
- Earned run average: 3.80
- Strikeouts: 245
- Stats at Baseball Reference

Teams
- Houston Astros (1989); Uni-President Lions (1992–1994); Wei Chuan Dragons (1998–1999)

Career highlights and awards
- CPBL Most Progressive Award (1993); 2x Taiwan Series champion (1998, 1999)
Medals
Men's baseball
Representing Dominican Republic
World Baseball Classic
Gold medal – first place	2013 San Francisco	Team

Joselito "José" Canó Soriano (born March 7, 1962) is a Dominican former professional baseball pitcher. He played in Major League Baseball (MLB) for the Houston Astros in 1989. He also played in the Chinese Professional Baseball League (CPBL) for the Uni-President Lions and Wei Chuan Dragons from 1992 to 1999.

== Playing career ==
Canó pitched six games with the Houston Astros and was the only major league pitcher to record a complete game in his final major league appearance (which was his only win).

Canó played on the Uni-President Lions from 1992 to 1994 and the Wei Chuan Dragons from 1998 to 1999 in Taiwan.

== Coaching career ==
On August 10, 2024, Cano was announced as the bullpen coach for the Dominican Republic national baseball team in the 2024 WBSC Premier12.

== Personal life ==
His son, Robinson Canó, whom he named after Jackie Robinson, is an MLB second baseman. Canó pitched to both his son and to David Ortiz in the 2011 Major League Baseball Home Run Derby, won by his son. He also pitched to Los Angeles Dodgers outfielder Yasiel Puig in the 2014 Major League Baseball Home Run Derby.

Awards
Preceded by First Winner	CPBL Most Progressive Award; 1993	Succeeded by Lu Yi-chuan(劉義傳)
