= List of CPBL ERA champions =

Chinese Professional Baseball League recognizes earned run average champions each season. The champion would be awarded.

== Champions ==
Year	Player	Team	ERA
1990	(United States) Joe Strong (史 東J.S.)	Wei Chuan Dragons	1.92
1991	(Taiwan) Huang Ping-yang (黃平洋)	Wei Chuan Dragons	1.89
1992	(Dominican Republic) Julio Solano (沙 勒J.S.)	Mercuries Tigers	1.94
1993	(Taiwan) Chen Yi-sin (陳義信)	Brother Elephants	1.92
1994	(Dominican Republic) José Núñez (王 漢J.N.)	Uni-President Lions	2.08
1995	(Dominican Republic) José Núñez (王 漢J.N.)	Uni-President Lions	1.88
1996	(United States) Robert Wishnevski (勞 勒R.W.)	Brother Elephants	1.67
1997	(United States) Michael Garcia (賈西M.G.)	Wei Chuan Dragons	1.89
1998	(United States) Kevin Henthorne (郝有力K.H.)	Chinatrust Whales	2.09
1999	(United States) Carlos Mirabal (馬來寶C.M.)	Chinatrust Whales	1.87
2000	(United States) Mark Kiefer (楓 康M.K.)	Sinon Bulls	1.62
2001	(Taiwan) Hsiao Jen-wen (蕭任汶)	Brother Elephants	1.40
2002	(Taiwan) Song Chau-chi (宋肇基)	Chinatrust Whales	2.13
2003	(United States) John Frascatore (威 森J.F.)	Uni-President Lions	1.80
2004	(Taiwan) Lin Ying-chia (林英傑)	Macoto Cobras	1.73
2005	(Taiwan) Lin En-Yu (林恩宇)	Macoto Cobras	1.72
2006	(Taiwan) Lin En-Yu (林恩宇)	Macoto Cobras	1.73
2007	(United States) Pete Munro (曼諾P.M.)	Uni-President Lions	2.03
2008	(Taiwan) Liao Yu-cheng (廖于誠)	Brother Elephants	2.31
2009	(Taiwan) Pan Wei-Lun (潘威倫)	Uni-President Lions	3.30
2010	(United States) Carlos Castillo (卡斯帝C.C.)	Brother Elephants	2.17
2011	(United States) Kenneth Alan Ray (銳K.R.)	Lamigo Monkeys	2.85
2012	(United States) Jon Leicester (強納森J.L.)	Uni-President 7-Eleven Lions	2.48
2013	(United States) Andrew Sisco (希 克A.S.)	EDA Rhinos	2.70
2014	(Taiwan) Cheng Kai-wen (鄭凱文)	CTBC Brothers	2.48
2015	(United States) Mike Loree (羅 力M.L.)	EDA Rhinos	3.26
2016	(United States) Mike Loree (羅 力M.L.)	EDA Rhinos	3.98
2017	(United States) Mike Loree (羅 力M.L.)	Fubon Guardians	2.18
2018	(United States) Josh Roenicke (羅里奇J.R.)	Uni-President 7-Eleven Lions	3.17
2019	(United States) Mike Loree (羅 力M.L.)	Fubon Guardians	2.78
2020	(Dominican Republic) José de Paula (德保拉J.D.)	CTBC Brothers	3.20
2021	(Dominican Republic) José de Paula (德保拉J.D.)	CTBC Brothers	1.77
2022	(Taiwan) Huang Tzu-peng (黃子鵬)	Rakuten Monkeys	2.33
2023	(United States) Jake Brigham (布里悍J.B.)	Wei Chuan Dragons	2.51
2024	(Taiwan) Gu Lin Ruei-Yang (古林睿煬)	Uni-President 7-Eleven Lions	1.66
2025	(Venezuela) Nivaldo Rodríguez (羅 戈N.R.)	CTBC Brothers	1.84
2026	(United States) John Gant (蔣 銲J.G.)	Wei Chuan Dragons	1.49
