= Liao Yu-cheng =

Taiwanese baseball player

- Pitcher
- Born: 4 September 1980 (age 45); Taoyuan County (now Taoyuan City), Taiwan
- Bats: Right Throws: Right

CPBL debut
- March 18, 2005, for the Brother Elephants

Career statistics (through 2009)
- Record: 26-19
- ERA: 3.106
- Strikeouts: 259
- Stats at Baseball Reference

Teams
- Brother Elephants (2005–2009)

Career highlights and awards
- CPBL Most Progressive Award (2008)

Liao Yu-cheng (Chinese: 廖于誠; pinyin: Liào Yúchéng; Wade–Giles: Liao^{4} Yú^{2} Cheng^{2}; born 4 September 1980 in Taoyuan County (now Taoyuan City), Taiwan) is a former Taiwanese professional baseball player who played for the Brother Elephants of Chinese Professional Baseball League.

Liao was a submarine pitcher and was given the nickname Golden Submarine due to Brother Elephant's yellow uniform.

== Early life ==
In senior high school Liao was originally an outfielder until the team's pitching coach noticed him throw a 93 mph fastball and encouraged him to become a pitcher.

In the 2004 CPBL Draft, La New Bears and Macoto Cobras noticed Liao pitch up to 88 mph with a sidearm delivery and both teams welcomed Liao to enter the Draft. With no other teams attentions, Brother Elephants picked up Liao in the first round of draft.

== Professional career ==
In his first career season, Liao pitched only one game: three innings earning two runs. The Elephants were ready to release Liao; and the Bears were ready to claim him however the 2005 manager convinced the team to keep Liao; he thought that Liao could be an excellent pitcher and just needed a chance.

In the 2006 season, the pitching coach made Liao a starting pitcher.

On May 10, 2007 Liao got his first career win in CPBL.

In the 2008 CPBL season, he gained the ERA Championship Award and the Most Progressive Award. Liao later participated in the 2009 World Baseball Classic and showed up in the Round 1 Pool A match between Chinese Taipei and South Korea, the eventual runner-up. He was allowed one point in his 3-inning pitching and his performance was praised by South Korean manager Kim In-Sik.

After the 2009 Taiwan Series Liao came under investigation for game fixing allegations. On January 6, 2010, Liao confessed to the Banciao District Prosecutors' Office that in 2007 when he was a minor player with only NT$55,000 (ca. US$1,700) monthly salary, he accepted NT$600,000 (ca. US$18,500) from gamblers and pitched one game for them. Liao also insisted that it was his only game-fixing activity throughout his career and because he later felt deeply uneasy for it, he donated NT$300,000 to local charitable organizations. As a result, Liao was expelled by the Brother Elephants, ending his short baseball career.

As of September 2010, Liao coaches in a club baseball team in his hometown of Taoyuan County.

== Career statistics ==
Season	Team	G	W	L	HD	SV	CG	SHO	BB	SO	ER	INN	ERA
2005	Brother Elephants	1	0	0	0	0	0	0	0	0	2	3.0	6.00
2006	Brother Elephants	12	0	3	0	0	0	0	37	20	18	37.1	4.34
2007	Brother Elephants	22	4	7	0	0	0	0	58	68	44	119.1	3.32
2008	Brother Elephants	21	11	3	0	0	4	1	72	102	34	132.2	2.31
2009	Brother Elephants	22	11	6	0	0	1	0	83	64	48	130.2	3.306
Total	5 years	72	23	16	0	0	5	1	222	249	132	384.2	3.09

Awards
Preceded by Pete Munro	CPBL ERA Champion Award; 2008	Succeeded by Pan Wei-lun (潘威倫)
Preceded by Hsu Yu-wei (徐余偉)	CPBL Most Progressive Award; 2008	Succeeded by Cheng Ta-Hung (鄭達鴻)
