= Comeback Player of the Year Award =

Comeback Player of the Year Award may refer to:

== Baseball ==
=== Major League Baseball ===
- Major League Baseball Comeback Player of the Year Award
- Players Choice Awards (Players Choice Awards Comeback Player)
- The Sporting News Comeback Player of the Year Award

=== Other baseball ===
- List of CPBL Most Progressive Awards – Chinese Professional Baseball League (Taiwan; Republic of China)
- Nippon Professional Baseball Comeback Player of the Year Award (Japan)

== Other sports ==
- MLS Comeback Player of the Year Award – Major League Soccer
- NBA Comeback Player of the Year – National Basketball Association
- List of NFL Comeback Player of the Year awards – National Football League
- AP NFL Comeback Player of the Year
- John Cullen Award – International Hockey League
- Bogs Adornado PBA Comeback Player of the Year award
- WTA Comeback Player of the Year
- Champions Tour Comeback Player of the Year
- PGA Tour Comeback Player of the Year
