= Nivaldo Rodríguez =

Venezuelan baseball player (born 1997)

CTBC Brothers – No. 32
- Pitcher
- Born: April 16, 1997 (age 29); Naguanagua, Venezuela
- Bats: Right Throws: Right

Professional debut
- MLB: July 28, 2020, for the Houston Astros
- CPBL: April 6, 2024, for the Fubon Guardians

MLB statistics (through 2021 season)
- Win–loss record: 0–1
- Earned run average: 4.50
- Strikeouts: 11

CPBL statistics (through 2025 season)
- Win–loss record: 21–11
- Earned run average: 2.00
- Strikeouts: 298
- Stats at Baseball Reference

Teams
- Houston Astros (2020–2021); Fubon Guardians (2024); CTBC Brothers (2025–present)
Medals
Men's baseball
Representing Venezuela
U-23 Baseball World Cup
Bronze medal – third place	2018 Colombia	Team

Nivaldo Apolinar Rodríguez (born April 16, 1997) is a Venezuelan professional baseball pitcher for the CTBC Brothers of the Chinese Professional Baseball League (CPBL). He has previously played in Major League Baseball (MLB) for the Houston Astros, and in the CPBL for the Fubon Guardians.

== Career ==
=== Houston Astros ===
Rodríguez signed with the Houston Astros as an international free agent on June 13, 2016. He spent the 2016 season with the DSL Astros, going 1–0 with a 1.17 ERA over 7 2/3 innings. He split the 2017 season between the DSL and the GCL Astros, going a combined 4–2 with a 2.05 ERA over 57 innings. he spent the 2018 season with the Tri City ValleyCats, going 4–1 with a 2.91 ERA over 55 2/3 innings. He split the 2019 season between the Quad Cities River Bandits and the Fayetteville Woodpeckers, going a combined 6–6 with a 2.40 ERA over 105 innings.

On November 20, 2019, the Astros added Rodríguez to their 40-man roster to protect him from the Rule 5 draft. He made his MLB debut on July 28, 2020, against the Los Angeles Dodgers. On July 31, 2021, Rodríguez was designated for assignment by the Astros to make room on the active roster for Jake Meyers.

=== Detroit Tigers ===
On August 2, 2021, Rodríguez was claimed off of waivers by the Detroit Tigers. He was assigned to the Triple-A Toledo Mud Hens. Rodríguez posted a 4.93 ERA in 13 appearances for Toledo. He was outrighted off of the 40-man roster following the season on November 19, 2021.

He was assigned to the Triple-A Toledo Mud Hens to begin the 2022 season. He appeared in 19 games (15 starts), struggling to a 3-8 record and 6.92 ERA with 49 strikeouts in 65.0 innings pitched. He was released on August 4, 2022.

=== Sioux City Explorers ===
On August 14, 2022, Rodríguez signed with the Sioux City Explorers of the American Association of Professional Baseball. He made five starts for the team down the stretch, recording a 3-1 record and 1.50 ERA with 40 strikeouts in 30 innings of work.

=== Sultanes de Monterrey ===
On February 20, 2023, Rodríguez signed with the Sultanes de Monterrey of the Mexican League. In 17 games for Monterrey, he registered a 5–5 record and 2.76 ERA with 84 strikeouts across 94 2/3 innings pitched.

=== Fubon Guardians ===
On January 15, 2024, Rodríguez signed with the Fubon Guardians of the Chinese Professional Baseball League (CPBL) in Taiwan. In 26 starts for the Guardians, he compiled a 10-4 record and 2.16 ERA with 156 strikeouts across 154 innings pitched. Rodríguez became a free agent following the season.

=== CTBC Brothers ===
On March 5, 2025, Rodríguez signed with the CTBC Brothers of the Chinese Professional Baseball League. In 25 starts for the team, he compiled an 11-7 record and 1.84 ERA with 142 strikeouts across 156 1/3 innings pitched. At the end of the regular season, Rodríguez led the league in ERA. He started Game 4 of the 2025 Taiwan Series for the Brothers.

On December 14, 2025, Rodríguez re-signed with the Brothers on a one-year contract. Rodríguez started Game 5 of the 2026 Taiwan Series for the Brothers.

== International career ==
Rodríguez was selected for the Venezuela national baseball team at the 2018 U-23 Baseball World Cup.
