= Major League Baseball Comeback Player of the Year Award =

Major League Baseball award

- Sport: Baseball
- League: Major League Baseball
- Awarded for: Player who "re-emerged on the baseball field during a given season" in American League and National League
- Country: United States, Canada
- Presented by: Major League Baseball

History
- First award: 2005
- Most recent: Zack Wheeler, NL; Yordan Álvarez, AL

The Major League Baseball Comeback Player of the Year Award is presented by Major League Baseball (MLB) to the player who is judged to have "re-emerged on the baseball field during a given season." The award was developed in 2005, as part of a sponsorship agreement between MLB and Viagra. In 2005 and 2006 representatives from MLB and MLB.com selected six candidates each from the American (AL) and National Leagues (NL) and one winner for each league was selected via an online poll on MLB.com. Since then, the winners have been selected by a panel of MLB beat reporters. Under the current voting structure, first place votes are worth five points, second place votes worth three, and third place votes worth one with the award going to the player with the most points overall. Past winners have often overcome injury or personal problems en route to their award-winning season.

A Comeback Player of the Year Award has been given by The Sporting News since 1965 but its results are not officially recognized by Major League Baseball. Since the beginning of the MLB award in 2005, the recipients have been identical with the following exceptions: 2008 NL (TSN honored Fernando Tatís, MLB honored Brad Lidge), 2010 AL (TSN honored Vladimir Guerrero, MLB honored Francisco Liriano), 2012 AL (TSN honored Adam Dunn, MLB honored Fernando Rodney), 2016 (TSN honored Jose Fernandez and Mark Trumbo, MLB honored Anthony Rendon and Rick Porcello), 2018 NL (TSN honored Matt Kemp, MLB honored Jonny Venters), 2019 AL (TSN honored Hunter Pence, MLB honored Carlos Carrasco), and 2020 AL (TSN honored Carrasco, MLB honored Salvador Pérez). Liriano and Posey are the only players to win the MLB award multiple times with Liriano being the first to win it in each league.

Twelve players were named to the Major League Baseball All-Star team in their Comeback Award-winning season: Jim Thome, Nomar Garciaparra, Dmitri Young, Cliff Lee, Brad Lidge, Aaron Hill, Tim Hudson, Lance Berkman, Jacoby Ellsbury, Buster Posey, Fernando Rodney, and Mariano Rivera, with Posey also being named to the All-MLB Team. Two players who were not named to the All-Star team in their winning year—Jason Giambi and Ken Griffey Jr.—were named to the All-Star team in their previous season. Several winners have won other awards in their winning season. Carlos Peña, Posey, Ellsbury, Griffey, and Hill won the Silver Slugger Award along with the Comeback Award. Posey won the NL MVP in his first comeback season. Lee won the Cy Young Award in his winning season and Lidge won both the Rolaids Relief Man Award and Delivery Man of the Year Award the same year. Rodney was also named Delivery Man of the Year in his comeback 2012 season. The most recent winners are Zack Wheeler of the NL and Yordan Álvarez of the AL.

== American League winners ==
Year	Winner	Image	Team	Position	Comeback
2005	Jason Giambi	A man in a grey baseball uniform and navy blue batting helmet swings through a pitch.	New York Yankees	First baseman/ Designated hitter	Giambi underwent knee surgery before the 2004 season. He also endured a variety of health problems during the season including an inflamed knee, a respiratory infection, an intestinal parasite infection, and a benign pituitary tumor. As a result, Giambi appeared in just 80 games during the 2004 regular season, batting .208. He returned to the Yankees in 2005 and led the American League in walks (108) and on-base percentage (.440).
2006	Jim Thome	A man in a grey baseball uniform with "Chicago" on his chest in black with a black cap, black batting gloves, and a baseball bat under his arm.	Chicago White Sox	Designated hitter	Thome experienced multiple elbow injuries during the 2005 season; appeared in just 59 regular-season games, batting .205; and was traded to the White Sox from the Philadelphia Phillies in the offseason. Thome was elected to the All-Star team in 2006, finishing the season with 42 home runs and 109 runs batted in.
2007	Carlos Peña	A man in a grey baseball uniform with "Rays" on the chest and "TB" on his blue batting helmet winces as he stops his swing.	Tampa Bay Devil Rays	First baseman	Pena was released by the Detroit Tigers before the 2006 season. He signed with the New York Yankees, but never appeared in a Major League game for them and was released on August 16, 2006. Finally the Boston Red Sox signed Pena, and he appeared in just 18 Major League games, spending the bulk of time in the minor leagues. In 2007 Pena set Tampa Bay franchise records in home runs (46), runs batted in (121), and walks (103) and won the Devil Rays' first Silver Slugger Award.
2008	Cliff Lee	A man in a grey baseball uniform with a blue cap throws a baseball.	Cleveland Indians	Starting pitcher	Lee pitched 97 1/3 innings in the Majors in 2007, going 5–8 with a 6.29 earned run average (ERA). He missed the first month of the season with an abdominal strain and was sent to the Triple-A minor league Buffalo Bisons mid-season. In 2008, he pitched 223 1/3 innings, went 22–3 with a 2.54 ERA, and won the Cy Young Award.
2009	Aaron Hill	A man in grey a baseball uniform with "Toronto" and "2" on the jersey, and a black cap with the Toronto Blue Jays logo on it.	Toronto Blue Jays	Second baseman	On May 29, 2008, Hill collided with former Blue Jays shortstop David Eckstein while fielding a fly ball and suffered a serious concussion. He did not return to the Majors that season. The injury was severe enough that Blue Jays manager Cito Gaston commented that "[s]ometimes people don't come back from concussions." Hill did return in 2009, however, hitting 36 home runs (third most ever by an American League second baseman) with 108 runs batted in; he led the American League in plate appearances and made the 2009 All-Star team. Hill also won the Silver Slugger Award at second base.
2010	Francisco Liriano		Minnesota Twins	Starting pitcher	Liriano missed the entire 2007 season due to Tommy John surgery and was limited by injuries the next two years, including a stint on the disabled list during the 2009 season. In 2010, however, Liriano threw the second-most innings of any pitcher for the Minnesota Twins, led the team in ERA, and allowed the fewest home runs per nine innings of any pitcher in the AL (0.4).
2011	Jacoby Ellsbury	A young man in a grey baseball jersey wearing a batting helmet with eyeblack under his eyes.	Boston Red Sox	Outfielder	In 2010, Ellsbury only played in 18 games after breaking three ribs in a fielding collision with Adrián Beltré. In 2011, Ellsbury was the first Red Sox player and one of four Major Leaguers (the most in a single season) to record 30 homers and 30 stolen bases, and he posted career highs in nearly every offensive category. The center fielder hit .321 with 32 homers, 105 RBIs, 39 steals, 46 doubles, five triples, and 119 runs, and he led the Majors with 364 total bases and 83 extra-base hits.
2012	Fernando Rodney		Tampa Bay Rays	Relief pitcher	Rodney battled ineffectiveness in 2011, blowing four saves and being replaced by Jordan Walden as closer of the Los Angeles Angels of Anaheim. In 2012, Rodney became the Rays' closer after Kyle Farnsworth went on the disabled list, and compiled 48 saves (second-most in the American League, only behind Jim Johnson of the Baltimore Orioles) in 50 opportunities while being named to the AL All-Star team and recording an earned run average (ERA) of 0.60, the second lowest in a single season by any pitcher in MLB history (min. 50 IP).
2013	Mariano Rivera		New York Yankees	Relief pitcher	Prior to a game on May 3, 2012, Rivera suffered a season-ending injury by tearing the anterior cruciate ligament (ACL) in his right knee, after twisting his leg while shagging balls in batting practice. Speculation grew that the injury would end his career, as he had hinted at retirement in spring training, but Rivera said that he intended to return. After undergoing ACL reconstructive surgery, he rehabilitated his leg in time to return for the 2013 season, which he announced would be his last. In his farewell season, the 43-year-old Rivera saved 44 games in 51 opportunities, with a 2.11 ERA and 1.05 WHIP.
2014	Chris Young		Seattle Mariners	Starting pitcher	Young didn't pitch in the majors in 2013, as thoracic outlet syndrome limited him to just nine starts in the Washington Nationals minor league system. The condition was so acute that the pain had Young considering retirement before it was ultimately surgically corrected in the 2013 offseason. Released by the Nationals at the tail end of 2014 spring training, Young signed with the Mariners and experienced a resurgence, being one of the team's most reliable starting pitchers. For the season, Young went 12–9 with a 3.65 earned run average.
2015	Prince Fielder		Texas Rangers	Designated hitter	Fielder played only 42 games in 2014 before having season-ending neck surgery. He bounced back strong in 2015, hitting .305/.378/.463 with 23 homers and 98 RBI in 158 games.
2016	Rick Porcello		Boston Red Sox	Starting pitcher	Porcello ended 2015 with a 9–15 record and an ERA of 4.92. He pitched only 172 innings and had a strikeout-to-walk ratio of 3.92. In 2016, Porcello won the AL Cy Young Award, going 22–4 with an ERA of 3.15 and pitching 223 innings, while leading the major leagues with a strikeout-to-walk ratio of 5.91.
2017	Mike Moustakas		Kansas City Royals	Third baseman	In 2016, Moustakas only played in 27 games after tearing his ACL in a fielding collision with Alex Gordon. In 2017, he played in 148 games and batted .272, and hit a career-high 38 home runs.
2018	David Price		Boston Red Sox	Starting pitcher	In 2017, Price made only 16 appearances (11 starts) due to elbow injuries, in which he was 6–3 with a 3.38 ERA. In 2018, he was 16–7 with a 3.58 ERA in 30 starts and was instrumental in Boston's eventual World Series championship.
2019	Carlos Carrasco		Cleveland Indians	Pitcher	In 2019, Carrasco was diagnosed with chronic myeloid leukemia in early June and missed three months while undergoing treatment before returning to game action in September.
2020	Salvador Pérez		Kansas City Royals	Catcher	Perez missed the entire 2019 season due to Tommy John Surgery. He also missed the start of "Summer Camp in July" – after testing positive for COVID-19 – and another three weeks during the season because of a lingering eye issue that caused blurred vision. He posted career highs in batting average (.333), slugging percentage (.633), and OPS (.986) while racking up 11 home runs and 32 RBIs in 37 games.
2021	Trey Mancini		Baltimore Orioles	Outfielder	Mancini missed the entire 2020 season after being diagnosed with stage III colon cancer. After the season ended, Mancini announced he was cancer-free and returned to the Orioles. In 2021, he hit 21 home runs with 71 RBIs.
2022	Justin Verlander		Houston Astros	Pitcher	Verlander made one start in 2020 before being shut down and missing the remainder of the season, as well as all of the 2021 season due to Tommy John Surgery. After missing the better part of two years, Verlander posted an 18–4 record and a major league-leading 1.75 ERA, leading the Astros to a World Series championship and winning his third career Cy Young Award.
2023	Liam Hendriks		Chicago White Sox	Pitcher	Hendriks was diagnosed with Stage 4 non-Hodgkin lymphoma in December 2022. He went through treatment in the off-season and returned to the mound on May 29. His 2023 season was cut short in August when he tore his UCL, which would require Tommy John Surgery. He finished the 2023 season with a 2–0 record with one save and a 5.40 ERA.
2024	Garrett Crochet		Chicago White Sox	Pitcher	Crochet missed the entire 2022 season and was limited to 13 appearances in 2023 while recovering from a partial left-elbow UCL tear and Tommy John Surgery. He finished the 2024 season with a 6–12 record with a 3.58 ERA and 209 strikeouts across 146 innings pitched, setting new career highs.
2025	Jacob deGrom		Texas Rangers	Pitcher	DeGrom made only 6 starts in the 2023 season before undergoing Tommy John Surgery, and made only 3 starts in 2024. In his first healthy season with the Rangers, he was named to the AL All-Star team, his first with the team, and finished with a 12-8 record and 2.97 ERA across 172.2 innings pitched.
2026	Yordan Álvarez		Houston Astros	Designated hitter	Álvarez played in 48 games in the 2025 season because of a right hand fracture and a left ankle sprain, he missed over 100 games. In 2026, he bounced back to lead the Major Leagues with a .316 batting average, .432 OBP, .601 SLG, and a 1.033 OPS. He also hit 42 home runs, 34 doubles, 106 RBI, and 109 walks.

== National League winners ==
Year	Winner	Image	Team	Position	Comeback
2005	Ken Griffey Jr.	A man in a grey baseball uniform with red sleeves and a red hat with a white "C" on it.	Cincinnati Reds	Center fielder	Griffey experienced several serious injuries from 2000 to 2004 including a torn hamstring, a torn knee tendon, a dislocated shoulder, and torn ankle tissue. His torn hamstring required major surgery in August 2004. He appeared in only 83 games in the 2004 season. Griffey returned in 2005, batted .301, and hit 35 home runs (his most in a season since 2000).
2006	Nomar Garciaparra	Portrait of a man wearing a blue baseball cap with "LA" on it and sunglasses over it.	Los Angeles Dodgers	First baseman	Garciaparra tore his groin while running out of the batter's box on April 20, 2005, and went on the disabled list. He did not play in another Major League game until August 5 and appeared in only 62 games that season. In 2006 Garciaparra batted .303, made the All-Star team, and made only four errors despite playing first base for the first time in his career.
2007	Dmitri Young	A man in a white baseball uniform with a red baseball cap and black glove plays in the field.	Washington Nationals	First baseman	Young experienced several personal issues throughout the 2006 season, including a divorce, treatment for substance abuse and depression, and pleading guilty to assaulting his girlfriend. He was also released by the Detroit Tigers during the season, appearing in only 48 games in the 2006 season. Young ended the 2007 season with a .320 batting average, which ranked 8th in the National League, and was named to the 2007 All-Star team.
2008	Brad Lidge	A man in grey pants, a blue baseball jersey, and a red baseball cap with "P" on it jogs in the field	Philadelphia Phillies	Relief pitcher	In 2006 and 2007, Lidge had 14 blown saves and a 4.37 earned run average (ERA) for the Houston Astros. Some attributed this lesser performance to a game-winning home run Albert Pujols hit off of him in Game 5 of the 2005 National League Championship Series. In 2008, Lidge had a 1.95 ERA and converted 41 saves in 41 save chances, winning both the Rolaids Relief Man Award and the Delivery Man of the Year Award. He would also convert all seven save opportunities in the postseason en route to winning the 2008 World Series.
2009	Chris Carpenter	A man in a grey baseball uniform stands bent over with his right leg in the air having just pitched the ball to home plate.	St. Louis Cardinals	Starting pitcher	Carpenter experienced several injuries including elbow surgery and Tommy John Surgery in the 2007 season followed by shoulder surgery in the 2008 season, allowing him to pitch just six innings in 2007 and 15 1/3 in 2008. In 2009, however, Carpenter posted a 17–4 record over 192 2/3 innings with a 2.24 earned run average (ERA), the lowest ERA in the National League that year.
2010	Tim Hudson		Atlanta Braves	Starting pitcher	Hudson suffered an elbow injury in 2008 requiring Tommy John Surgery, which kept him out for nearly a full season, returning to start a handful of games at the end of 2009. In 2010, however, Hudson pitched the full season for the Atlanta Braves. Hudson ranked in the league's top ten in wins (17, ranking 4th), innings pitched (228 2/3, 4th), winning percentage (.654, 4th), ERA (2.83, 6th), and WHIP (1.15, 9th.) Additionally, Hudson was named to the 2010 Major League Baseball All-Star Game.
2011	Lance Berkman	A man in a grey baseball uniform and a dark baseball cap jogs on grass holding a baseball glove in his right hand.	St. Louis Cardinals	Outfielder	Berkman suffered a knee injury in 2010 and batted just .248 for the season, posting an OPS of .781 (his career average through 2010 was .954). In 2011 Berkman ranked among the top 10 in the NL in on-base percentage (3rd), walks (4th), slugging percentage (5th), and home runs (9th). Some believed Ryan Vogelsong was a strong candidate for the 2011 award, with Sports Illustrated calling him the "leading candidate" in late June. Rob Neyer said Vogelsong was "robbed" of the award.
2012	Buster Posey		San Francisco Giants	Catcher/First baseman	Posey suffered a fractured fibula and torn ligaments in his ankle after a home-plate collision with Florida Marlins outfielder Scott Cousins on May 25, 2011. He had surgery to repair the damage and did not play at all for the rest of the 2011 season. In 2012, Posey returned to win the National League batting title with a .336 average, and also hit 24 home runs with 103 runs batted in while splitting time between catcher and first base for the 2012 World Series champion Giants. In addition to being named Comeback Player of the Year, he was also named NL MVP after the end of the 2012 season.
2013	Francisco Liriano		Pittsburgh Pirates	Starting pitcher	In 2012, Liriano struggled with the Minnesota Twins, recording a 5.31 ERA for the team. By July, he was traded to the Chicago White Sox, where he continued to underwhelm. He was eventually removed from the White Sox's starting rotation in September. After joining the Pirates in the offseason in 2013, Liriano had one of his best seasons, finishing with a 3.02 ERA, 16–8 record, and 163 strikeouts in 161 innings pitched, helping Pittsburgh make the postseason for the first time since 1992. Having previously won the award with the Twins in 2010, Liriano became the first player to win the award twice, as well as the only player to have won the award in both leagues.
2014	Casey McGehee		Miami Marlins	Third baseman	McGehee was a journeyman coming into 2014, having played with four Major League teams from 2008 to 2012 and in Japan in 2013. He established himself as a regular in 2014, playing 160 games for the Marlins and posting a .287 batting average.
2015	Matt Harvey		New York Mets	Starting pitcher	Harvey started the 2013 All-Star Game for the National League but missed the entire 2014 season after undergoing Tommy John Surgery on his pitching elbow. He returned in 2015 to make 29 starts for the NL champion Mets, going 13–8 with 188 strikeouts. His 2.71 ERA was good for sixth on the Senior Circuit.
2016	Anthony Rendon		Washington Nationals	Third baseman	In 2014, Rendon finished fifth in NL MVP voting going .287/.351/.473 with 39 doubles, 21 HRs, and 83 RBIs. In 2015, Rendon hit only .264/.344/.363 with just 16 doubles, 5 HRs, and 25 RBIs in just 355 plate appearances, dealing with a knee injury. However, Rendon remained healthy in 2016 and hit .270/.348/.450 with 38 doubles, 20 HRs, and 85 RBIs.
2017	Greg Holland		Colorado Rockies	Relief pitcher	After missing all of 2016 recovering from Tommy John Surgery, Holland earned 41 saves in 2017, tied for the NL lead, and helped the Rockies make the postseason.
2018	Jonny Venters		Atlanta Braves	Relief pitcher	Venters had not played in MLB since 2012, subsequently having to undergo Tommy John surgery for the second and third times; in 2018, he was 5–2 with three saves and a 3.67 ERA.
2019	Josh Donaldson		Atlanta Braves	Third baseman	In 2018, Donaldson played in only 52 games due to injuries. He returned in 2019 to hit 37 home runs and record 94 RBI, helping lead the Braves to an NL East title.
2020	Daniel Bard		Colorado Rockies	Relief pitcher	Bard had last pitched in the majors in the 2013 season and retired in 2017 due to control issues. He announced a comeback attempt in 2020 and was signed by the Rockies. He made the team's opening day roster and finished the season with a 4–2 record with six saves and a 3.65 ERA in 24 2/3 innings.
2021	Buster Posey		San Francisco Giants	Catcher	Posey earned NL Comeback Player honors after opting out of the shortened 2020 season. Despite winning the award and also being named to the All-MLB second team, Posey decided to retire after the 2021 season to spend more time with his family.
2022	Albert Pujols		St. Louis Cardinals	Designated Hitter	After being designated for assignment by the Los Angeles Angels in 2021 and entering his final season at age 42, Pujols turned back the clock by hitting 24 home runs, 18 of which came in the second half of the season, and posting a .895 OPS with the Cardinals. Pujols also became the fourth player in Major League history to hit 700 career home runs.
2023	Cody Bellinger		Chicago Cubs	Outfielder / First baseman	After winning the 2019 NL MVP for the Los Angeles Dodgers, Bellinger struggled for the final three years, and the Dodgers non-tendered his contract, making him a free agent. Signing with the Cubs in 2023, he finished the season with a slash line of .307/.356/.525, 26 home runs, and 97 RBI.
2024	Chris Sale		Atlanta Braves	Starting pitcher	After injuries in his final four seasons with the Boston Red Sox, Sale was traded to the Braves. Staying healthy, he made his first All-Star Game since 2018 and won the Triple Crown, leading the NL in ERA (2.38), strikeouts (225), and wins (18).
2025	Ronald Acuña Jr.		Atlanta Braves	Outfielder	After suffering a left anterior cruciate ligament tear in 2024, he was named to the NL All-Star team and participate in the 2025 Major League Baseball Home Run Derby. He finished the season with a slash line of .290/.417/.518 with 21 home runs, 42 RBIs, and 9 stolen bases.
2026	Zack Wheeler		Philadelphia Phillies	Starting pitcher	After suffering a blood clot in 2025, which ended his season in August the same year. He returned to the mound in late April of 2026, where he made 28 starts, posting a 14–5 record with a 3.00 ERA and 193 strikeouts.

== See also ==
- Players Choice Awards (includes Comeback Player)
- Sporting News Comeback Player of the Year Award
- Comeback Player of the Year Award (disambiguation), including similar awards in other sports
