= 2009 Taiwan Series =

Taiwan Baseball championship

- 2009 Taiwan Series logo
Team (Wins)	Manager(s)	Season
Uni-President 7-Eleven Lions (4)	Lu Wen-sheng	63-3-54, .538
Brother Elephants (3)	Shin Nakagomi	54-3–63, .462
- Dates: October 17–October 25
- MVP: Luther Hackman
- Outstanding Players: Pan Wu-hsiung; Peng Cheng-min
- Manager of the Year: Lu Wen-sheng

Broadcast
- Television: Videoland Television Network

The 2009 Taiwan Series was played by Uni-President 7-Eleven Lions and Brother Elephants, winners of the first and second half-seasons. After seven games, the Lions defeated the Elephants four games to three and won the title. Within a week of the last game of the series, Taiwanese prosecutors opened an investigation into possible match fixing in the series.

== Participants ==
- Uni-President 7-Eleven Lions - Winner of the first half-season.
- Brother Elephants - Winner of the second half-season.

== Rules ==
All regular season rules apply with the following exceptions:

- Each team is allowed to register 28 players on its active roster.
- No tied games.
- Two outfield umpires are added to the games.

== Summaries ==
=== Game 1 ===
October 17, 2009 at Tainan Municipal Baseball Stadium, Tainan City

Team	1	2	3	4	5	6	7	8	9	R	H	E
Brother	1	1	0	0	0	1	0	1	0	4	9	0
Uni-President 7-Eleven	2	0	0	2	0	1	0	0	X	5	7	2
WP: Luther Hackman (1–0) LP: Liao Yu-cheng (0–1) Sv: Lin Yueh-ping (1); Home runs: BRO: None; UNI: Liu Fu-hao (1); Attendance: 12,000

=== Game 2 ===
October 18, 2009 at Douliu Baseball Stadium, Douliu, Yunlin County

Team	1	2	3	4	5	6	7	8	9	R	H	E
Brother	0	1	0	0	0	0	0	0	0	2	12	0
Uni-President 7-Eleven	1	0	0	0	0	5	0	0	X	6	7	0
WP: Pan Wei-lun (1–0) LP: Mike Smith (0–1); Home runs: BRO: Chen Kuan-jen (1), Wang Jin-yong (1); UNI: None; Attendance: 13,331

=== Game 3 ===
October 20, 2009 at Chengcing Lake Baseball Field, Niaosong, Kaohsiung County

Team	1	2	3	4	5	6	7	8	9	10	R	H	E
Uni-President 7-Eleven	0	0	1	0	1	0	0	0	2	0	4	8	1
Brother	0	0	0	0	0	0	0	4	0	1	5	11	4
WP: Ryan Cullen (1-0) LP: Kao Chien-san (0–1); Home runs: UNI: Cheng Nai-wen (1); BRO: None; Attendance: 14.383

=== Game 4 ===
October 21, 2009 at Taichung Intercontinental Baseball Stadium, Taichung City

Team	1	2	3	4	5	6	7	8	9	R	H	E
Uni-President 7-Eleven	0	0	3	0	3	0	0	5	0	11	12	0
Brother	2	0	0	0	1	2	0	0	0	5	11	1
WP: Luther Hackman (2-0) LP: Liu Yu-chan (0–1); Home runs: UNI: Pan Wu-hsiung (1); BRO: Peng Cheng-min (1); Attendance: 20,000

=== Game 5 ===
October 22, 2009 at Xinzhuang Baseball Stadium, Xinzhuang City, Taipei County

Team	1	2	3	4	5	6	7	8	9	10	R	H	E
Uni-President 7-Eleven	3	0	0	0	0	0	0	1	0	0	4	8	1
Brother	1	0	0	0	3	0	0	0	0	1	5	9	7
WP: Ryan Cullen (2-0) LP: Lin Yueh-ping (0-1); Attendance: 12,500

=== Game 6 ===
October 24, 2009 at Tainan Municipal Baseball Stadium, Tainan City

Team	1	2	3	4	5	6	7	8	9	10	11	12	13	14	15	16	17	R	H	E
Brother	3	0	0	0	1	0	0	0	0	0	0	0	0	0	0	0	1	5	18	4
Uni-President 7-Eleven	2	1	0	0	0	0	0	0	0	0	0	0	0	0	0	0	0	4	12	5
WP: Li Hou-jen (1-0) LP: Kao Chien-san (0-1); Home runs: BRO: Peng Cheng-min (2), Wang Seng-wei (1); UNI: None; Attendance: 12,000

This game is the currently the longest game (17 innings) in CPBL's history.

=== Game 7 ===
October 25, 2009 at Tainan Municipal Baseball Stadium, Tainan City

Team	1	2	3	4	5	6	7	8	9	R	H	E
Brother	0	0	0	0	2	0	0	0	0	2	6	2
Uni-President 7-Eleven	0	2	1	0	0	0	2	0	0	5	7	1
WP: Luther Hackman (3-0) LP: Chin-hui Tsao (0-1) Sv: Pan Wei-lun (1); Attendance: 12,000
