= World University Baseball Championship =

College baseball competition

- Current season, competition or edition: 2018
- Sport: Baseball
- Founded: 2002
- No. of teams: 8 (in 2018)
- Continent: International
- Most recent champion: Japan (2018)
- Most titles: United States (3 titles)

The World University Baseball Championship is an under-23 international college baseball competition sponsored by the International University Sports Federation (FISU) and was first held in 2002 in Italy. Until 2013, it was sanctioned by the then-International Baseball Federation (IBAF) and was one of several tournaments considered by the IBAF to be a minor world championship, and as such the results of the tournaments affected the IBAF World Rankings. For its men's world rankings, the World Baseball Softball Confederation (WBSC) -- successor to the IBAF—now uses the results of WBSC's biennial 23U Baseball World Cup (instead of the World University Championship).

== History ==
The fifth World University Baseball Championship was held from July 29 to August 8, 2010 in Tokyo, Japan and was organized by the All Japan University Baseball Federation.

== Results ==
Year	Final Host	Medalists		
Year	Final Host	Gold	Silver	Bronze
2002; Details	(Italy); Messina	Cuba	United States	Japan
2004; Details	(Taiwan); Tainan City	United States	Japan	South Korea
2006; Details	(Cuba); Havana	United States	Chinese Taipei	Cuba
2008; Details	(Czech Republic); Brno	United States	Japan	Chinese Taipei
2010; Details	(Japan); Tokyo	Cuba	United States	Japan
2012	(Taiwan); Taoyuan	FISU cancelled the tournament due to an insufficient number of teams participating.		
2018; Details	(Taiwan); Chiayi	Japan	Chinese Taipei	South Korea

== Medal table ==
Rank	Nation	Gold	Silver	Bronze	Total
1	United States	3	2	0	5
2	Cuba	2	0	1	3
3	Japan	1	2	2	5
4	Chinese Taipei (TPE)	0	2	1	3
5	South Korea	0	0	2	2
Totals (5 entries)		6	6	6	18

== See also ==
- Baseball awards
- Baseball at the Summer Universiade
- U-23 Baseball World Cup
