= Wang Feng-hsin =

Taiwanese baseball player

Wang Feng-hsin (Chinese: 王豐鑫; pinyin: Wáng Fēngxīn), sometimes spelled Wang Fong-jin, is a Taiwanese baseball pitcher who is currently a free agent. In 2010, Feng-hsin went 7–4 with a 2.60 ERA over 100⅓ innings of work, after spending most of the previous two seasons on the bench. He was awarded the CPBL Most Improved Player of the Year award following his 2010 performance.
