= 2002 World University Baseball Championship =

Tournament details
- Country: Italy
- Dates: 2–11 August
- Teams: 10

Final positions
- Champions: Cuba (1st title)
- Runners-up: United States
- Third place: Japan
- Fourth place: Chinese Taipei

Tournament statistics
- Games played: 31

Awards
- MVP: (Cuba) Orelvis Avila

The 2002 World University Baseball Championship was an under-23 international college baseball tournament that was held from August 2 to 11, 2002. The final game was held on August 11, 2002 in Messina, Italy. It was the first time the University Championship took place. Italy hosted the tournament and 10 nations competed.

In the end, the Cuba won their first University Championship, over a win against runner-up United States.

== Round 1 ==
=== Pool A ===
Qualified for the quarter-finals
Did not qualify for the quarter-finals

Team	W	L	R	RA	PCT
United States	3	1	38	7	.750
Italy	3	1	18	14	.750
South Korea	2	2	23	23	.500
China	2	2	13	13	.500
Canada	0	4	7	42	.000

=== Pool B ===
Qualified for the quarter-finals
Did not qualify for the quarter-finals

Team	W	L	R	RA	PCT
Cuba	4	0	29	4	1.000
Japan	3	1	25	2	.750
Chinese Taipei	2	2	17	14	.500
Czech Republic	1	3	5	30	.250
France	0	4	6	32	.000

== Round 2 ==
Quarterfinals
A1	United States	14
B4	Czech Republic	1
B2	Japan	6
A3	South Korea	1
A2	Italy	3
B3	Chinese Taipei	14
B1	Cuba	3
A4	China	0

Semifinals
Q1	United States	2
Q2	Japan	1
Q3	Chinese Taipei	0
Q4	Cuba	2

Final
S1	United States	0
S2	Cuba	6

== Final standings ==
Rk	Team	W	L
1	Cuba	7	0
Lost in the Final
2	United States	5	2
Failed to qualify for Final
3	Japan	5	2
4	Chinese Taipei	3	4
Failed to qualify for the Semi-Finals
5	South Korea	3	3
6	Italy	3	3
7	China	3	3
8	Czech Republic	1	4
9	Canada	1	4
10	France	0	5

2002 World University Baseball champions

Cuba
1st title
