= Huang Chin-chih =

Taiwanese baseball player

Chinatrust Brothers – No. 16
- Pitching Coach
- Born: 18 January 1978 (age 47); Kaohsiung, Taiwan
- Bats: Left Throws: Left
- Stats at Baseball Reference

Teams
- As player: Taichung Agan (2001–2002); Macoto Gida/Cobras (2003–2004, 2006–2007); La New Bears/Lamigo Monkeys (2008–2013); CTBC Brothers (2014); As coach: CTBC Brothers (2014–2016)

Huang Chin-chih (Chinese: 黃欽智; pinyin: Huáng Qīnzhì; born 1 January 1978) is a Taiwanese former professional baseball player who was the last MVP of the Taiwan Major League. He later became the pitching coach with the CTBC Brothers in the Chinese Professional Baseball League (CPBL)

== Early life and amateur career ==
Huang won two games in the 1989 Little League World Series, when his Kaohsiung team made it to the finals. In the finale, he played right field and hit 9th, going 0 for 1 before leaving in a 5–2 loss to Trumbull, CT. Huang played for Taiwan three times in the World Junior Championship. He won a Bronze in the 1994 World Junior Championship and a Silver in the 1995 World Junior Championship, when he beat Cuba. He played in the 1996 Asian Junior Championship and was MVP of the 1996 World Junior Championship, when he hit .583 to lead the competition and also went 3–1 with 28 strikeouts in 27 innings on the mound. Taiwan finished with the Silver, as Huang allowed a 6th-inning run to Cuba to break a 5–5 tie in the gold medal game. Despite his fine hitting, he made the tourney All-Star team as a pitcher rather than as an outfielder. Among those he outhit in the event were Michel Enríquez, Rick Ankiel, Josh Bard, Yosvani Peraza, Mike Cuddyer, Dane Sardinha and Tim Drew.

== Professional career ==
=== Taiwan Major League ===
Huang was the first pick of the Taiwan Major League draft in 2001, going to the Taichung Agan. He made the move pay off, going 7–3 with a league-leading 1.62 ERA (a solid .81 ahead of Yi-sung Li, the runner-up). He was named Rookie of the Year and Finals MVP. He helped Taiwan to a Gold in the 2001 Asian Championship. The lefty had no sophomore slump, as he went 16–2 with two saves and a 1.46 ERA in 2002, setting the league record for ERA. He beat out Koji Muto by .8 for the ERA title. Along with Hiroki Sakai, he combined for 16 strikeouts on March 31 to set a TML team record for whiffs in a game. He won the Gold Glove, the Best Nine at pitcher and the Taiwan Major League Most Valuable Player Award. He was the 5th pitcher to be named TML MVP, but only the second Taiwan native among that group, following Yi-Hsin Chen (American Don August and Japanese Hisanobu Watanabe and Takehiro Ishii had won as well). He would also be the loop's final MVP, as the TML dissolved at year's end. He won a Silver Medal with Taiwan at the 2002 Asian Games.

=== CPBL playing career ===
Huang then moved to the Chinese Professional Baseball League (CPBL), with the Macoto Gida club. He was 0–1 with a 3.54 ERA in 2003, not nearly as dominant as he had been in the TML, while he battled shoulder problems. He went 2–4 with 6 saves and a 3.21 ERA in 2004 then missed all of 2005 due to surgery. He had a 5.40 ERA in limited action in 2006. In 2007, the former ace starter was now a LOOGY, going 1–1 with 2 saves and a 1.82 ERA in 39 2/3 IP over 44 games for Macoto (now the Macoto Cobras).

The Cobras became the dmedia T-REX in 2008, and Huang asked to move back to the south. He was traded to the La New Bears for Hsiang-Kai Shih. He was 4–3 with a 4.56 ERA in his first season for the Bears. In 2009, the veteran was 1–0 with 3 saves and a 3.26 ERA in 56 games. He was 5th in the CPBL in appearances, between Matt Perisho and Po-Hsuan Keng. The next year, the Kaohsiung native had a 6–3, 3.50 record while being used as a starter regularly for the first time since his surgeries.

In 2011, Huang was 7–4 with a 4.40 ERA as a swingman for his club (now renamed the Lamigo Monkeys). Have up the losing hit in game four of the 2011 Taiwan Series as the Monkeys fell in five games. In 2012, Chin-Chih was back in the bullpen and went 1–2 with 6 saves and a 3.46 ERA in 34 games.

Huang was the oldest player on Taiwan's roster for the 2013 World Baseball Classic Qualifiers, about 7 months ahead of Cheng-Min Peng. In his lone outing, in the opener against New Zealand, he relieved Yao-Lin Wang with a 1–0 lead in the 4th, a man on second and two out. He struck out Daniel Devonshire to end the inning. In the 5th, he gave up back-to-back hits to Beau Bishop and Moko Moanaroa. After Max Brown bunted the runners over, Ta-Yuan Kuan relieved. Taiwan went on to a 10–0 rout and would win a spot in the 2013 World Baseball Classic.

Huang throws a changeup, fastball (peak 93 mph), slider, curveball and sinker.
