= Vince Horsman =

Canadian baseball player

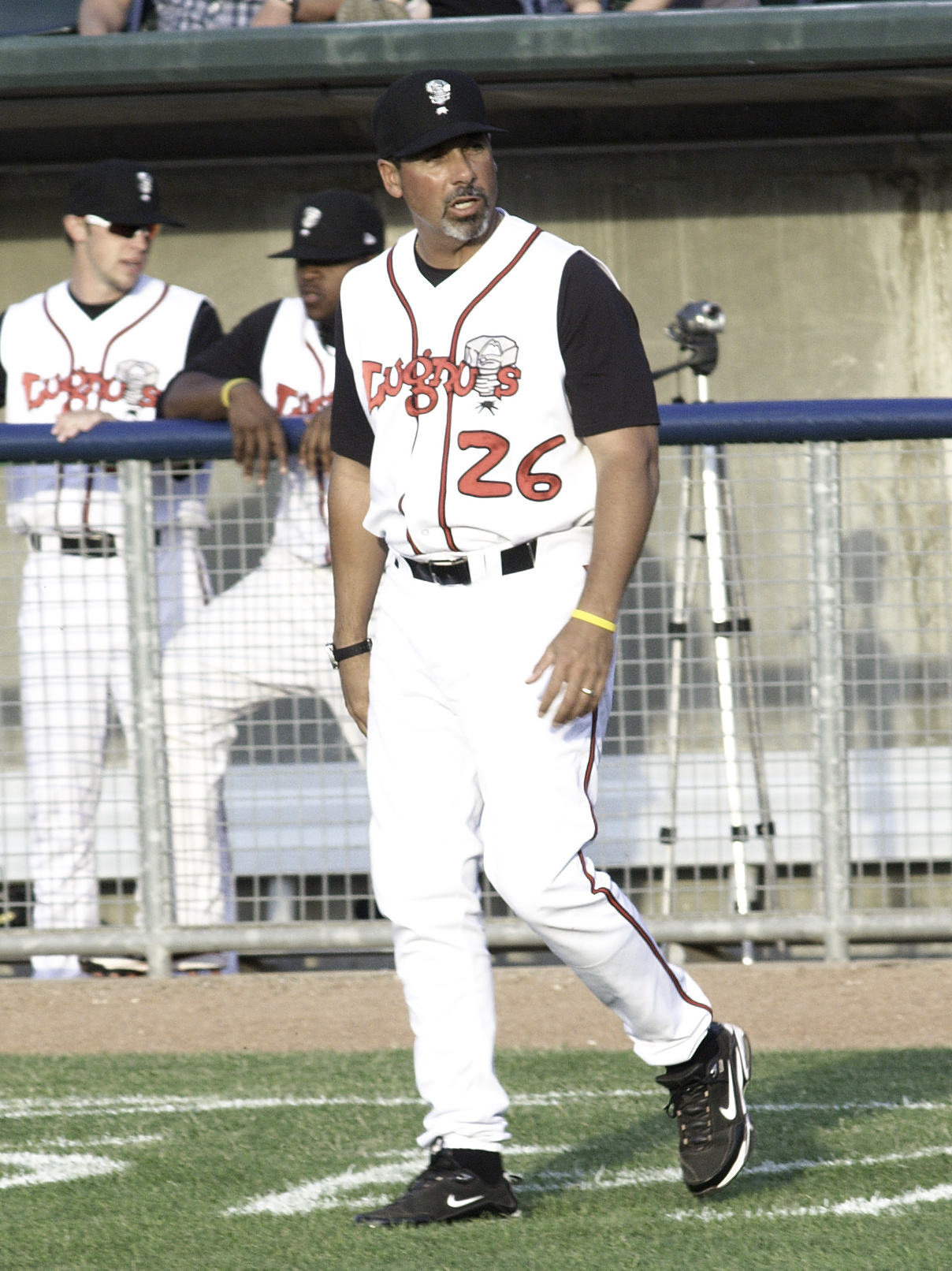
- Horsman with the Lansing Lugnuts in 2011

Uni-President Lions – No. 98
- Pitching Coach
- Born: March 9, 1967 (age 59); Halifax, Nova Scotia, Canada
- Batted: Right Threw: Left

Professional debut
- MLB: September 5, 1991, for the Toronto Blue Jays
- TML: 1996, for the Taichung Agan

Last appearance
- MLB: May 13, 1995, for the Minnesota Twins
- TML: 1997, for the Chianan Luka

MLB statistics
- Win–loss record: 4–2
- Earned run average: 4.07
- Strikeouts: 61
- Stats at Baseball Reference

Teams
- Toronto Blue Jays (1991); Oakland Athletics (1992–1994); Minnesota Twins (1995); Taichung Agan (1996); Chianan Luka (1997)

Vince Stanley Joseph Horsman (born March 9, 1967) is a Canadian former professional baseball pitcher who is currently pitching coach for the Uni-President 7-Eleven Lions in the CPBL, who played five seasons in Major League Baseball for the Toronto Blue Jays, Oakland Athletics, and Minnesota Twins. He also played in the Taiwan Major League for the Taichung Agan and the Chianan Luka. He has coached pitching for several Blue Jay minor league affiliates.

On November 3, 2012, Horsman was inducted into the Nova Scotia Sport Hall of Fame.

In 2009, Horsman was the pitching coach for the Blue Jays' short-season Auburn Doubledays. Between 2010 and 2014, he was a part of the Class-A Lansing Lugnuts coaching staff. On December 18, 2014, he was promoted to the (Advanced-A) Dunedin Blue Jays. On January 20, 2016, he was promoted to the Double-A New Hampshire Fisher Cats, where he remained until 2019. In 2021 he served as the scouting and senior national team pitching coach for Federazione Italian Baseball Softball League (FIBS). In 2024, he became the pitching coordinator/consultant for the Uni-President 7-Eleven Lions in Taiwan, where he is currently the pitching coach.
