= Hsieh Chia-hsien =

Taiwanese baseball player

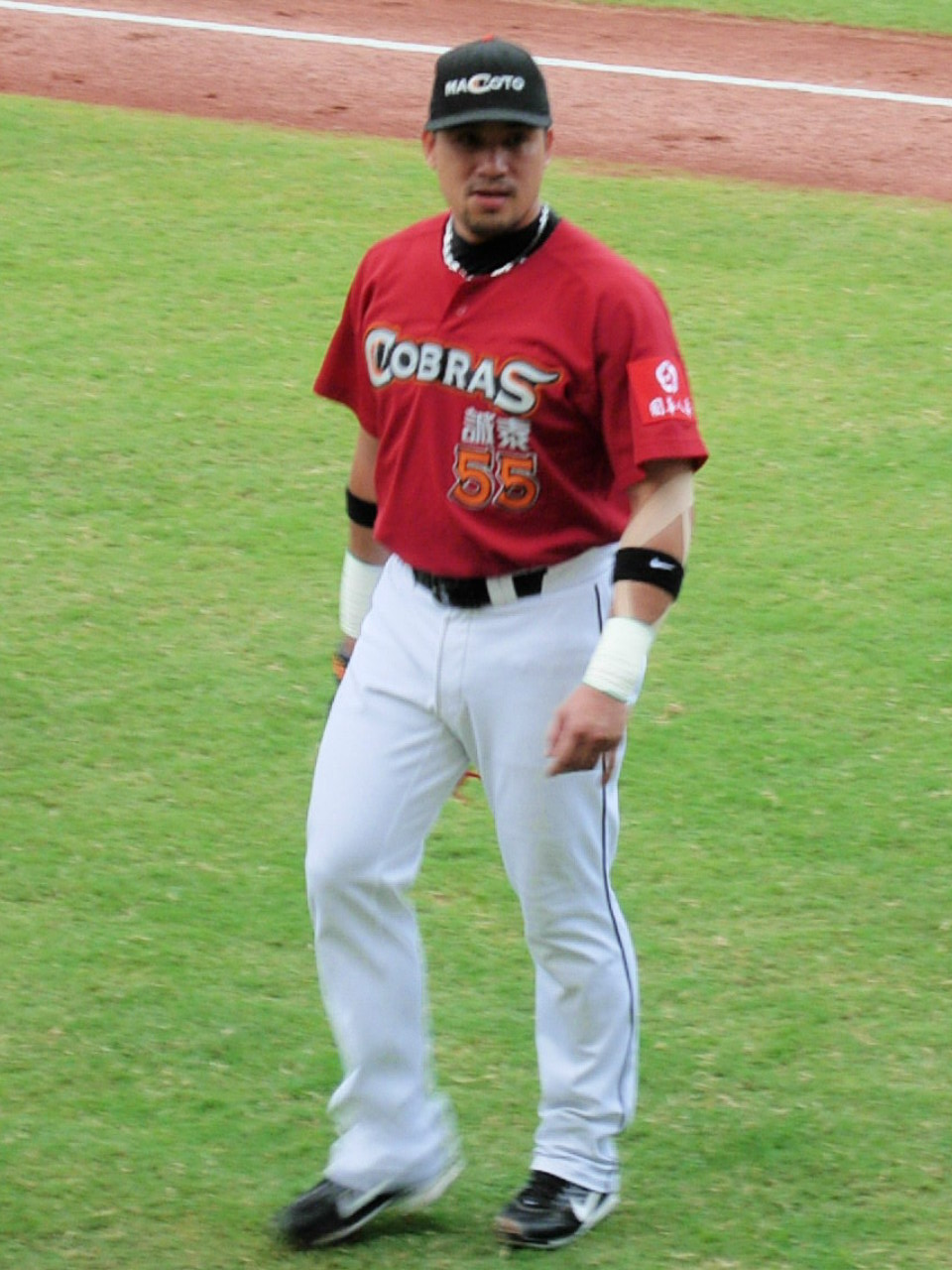
- Center fielder
- Born: 8 April 1976 (age 49); Hualien City, Hualien County, Taiwan
- Batted: Left Threw: Left

CPBL debut
- March 13, 2003, for the Macoto Gida

Last CPBL appearance
- October 12, 2009, for the Sinon Bulls

Career statistics
- Batting average: .288
- Home runs: 127
- Runs batted in: 444
- Stats at Baseball Reference

Teams
- Taichung Agan (1998–2002); Macoto Gida/ Macoto Cobras/ dmedia T-REX (2003–2008); Sinon Bulls (2009)

Career highlights and awards
- 3× TML home run champion (2000–2002); 4× CPBL Best Ten (2003–2005, 2007); CPBL Gold Glove Award (2004); CPBL Silver Slugger Award (2005); CPBL home run champion (2005); CPBL RBI leader (2005)
Medals
Men's baseball
Representing Chinese Taipei
Intercontinental Cup
Bronze medal – third place	2006 Taichung	Team
Asian Games
Silver medal – second place	2002 Busan	Team
Gold medal – first place	2006 Doha	Team
Asian Baseball Championship
Bronze medal – third place	1999 Seoul	Team
Silver medal – second place	2003 Sapporo	Team
Bronze medal – third place	2007 Taichung	Team

Hsieh Chia-hsien (Chinese: 謝佳賢; pinyin: Xiè Jiaxián; Wade–Giles: Hsieh^{4} Chia^{5} Hsien^{2}; born 8 April 1976 in Hualien City, Hualien County, Taiwan) is a Taiwanese professional baseball player. Originally drafted by the Taiwan Major League's Taichung Agan in 1998, after TML's merger into CPBL he has been playing for the Chinese Professional Baseball League's Macoto Gida and its successors Macoto Cobras and Dmedia T-REX since 2003. A left-handed outfielder and first baseman, he is well known for his offensive and powerful batting. He has been a frequent member of the Chinese Taipei national baseball team since 1999 and holds a controversial record of reaching career 100th home run fastest in the history of professional baseball in Taiwan in within only 454 games; CPBL did not recognize this record because his first 75 home runs were hit in the TML. He also hit CPBL's milestone 5000th home run on April 12, 2006.

He competed at the 2004 Summer Olympics.

== Basic Information ==
- Number: 55
- Height: 176 cm
- Weight: 87 kg
- Bats: Left

== Career Records ==
Season	Team	G	AB	R	H	2B	3B	HR	RBI	TB	BB	K	SB	CS	AVG
2007	Macoto Cobras	95	372	84	131	32	2	19	79	224	41	80	5	0	0.352
2006	Macoto Cobras	100	370	61	95	20	0	19	61	172	46	83	11	1	0.257
2005	Macoto Cobras	101	348	76	99	27	0	23	74	195	77	99	9	3	0.284
2004	Macoto Cobras	100	362	67	103	24	5	17	67	188	58	91	13	3	0.285
2003	Macoto Gida	100	356	50	95	23	1	18	59	174	60	91	2	2	0.267
2002	Taichung Agan	72	268	51	86	20	0	19	64	163	35	64	5	3	0.321
2001	Taichung Agan	60	199	48	49	11	1	14	46	104	52	58	10	0	0.246
2000	Taichung Agan	48	152	36	53	9	0	15	38	107	43	38	5	2	0.349
1999	Taichung Agan	76	282	58	82	16	2	15	57	147	52	61	4	3	0.291
1998	Taichung Agan	58	205	52	69	14	0	12	38	119	48	54	13	1	0.337

== See also ==
- List of the Taiwan national baseball team squad at the 2006 Asian Games
- List of the Taiwan national baseball team squad at the 2006 World Baseball Classic
- Chinese Taipei national baseball team
