= CPBL All-Star Game =

Annual baseball game in Taiwan

The CPBL All-Star Game (Chinese: 中華職棒明星賽), alternatively known as Red v. White All-Star Game (Chinese: 紅白明星對抗賽), is an annual baseball game held by the Chinese Professional Baseball League of Taiwan. The teams are organized along the geographic dispositions of the member organizations; the red team is made up of players from Rakuten Monkeys of Taoyuan and Fubon Guardians of Kaohsiung, while the white team consists of players from CTBC Brothers of Taipei and Uni-President 7-Eleven Lions of Tainan.

Between 1990 and 1992, the locations of the All-Star Game were fixed at Taipei, Taichung, and Kaohsiung, with one game at each location annually. The regulation was amended and currently there is only one game each year with location varies from year to year. There is also a Home Run Derby the day before the All-Star Game.

Star Game in 2013 to increase the fun, then changed to a hybrid (first defensive position by voting, that "special pick-Star Game Club" by the head coach of both teams draft) fans voted with the largest number of votes each defensive position before the two name (outfielder top six) as the starting teams, head coach of the rest of the players adopt the recommended way to join the race list.

== Results ==
Season	Red Star	Games won	White Star
1990	Tigers, Lions	2–1	Dragons, Elephants
1991	Dragons, Elephants	1–2	Tigers, Lions
1992	Lions, Tigers	1–1–1	Dragons, Elephants
1993	Elephants, Tigers, Eagles	9–2	Dragons, Lions, Bears
1994	Elephants, Dragons, Eagles	11–5	Lions, Bears, Tigers
1995	Elephants, Eagles, Dragons	1–9	Lions, Tigers, Bears
1996	Lions, Eagles, Dragons	6–4	Tigers, Elephants, Bulls
1997	Lions, Dragons, Tigers	1–4	Eagles, Elephants, Bulls, Whales
1998	Dragons, Tigers, Bulls	3–1	Lions, Whales, Elephants
1999	Dragons, Tigers, Elephants	5–0	Elephants, Lions, Whales
2000	Elephants, Bulls	7–3	Lions, Whales
2001	Rookie	5–9	Veteran
2002	Elephants, Bulls	2–7	Lions, Whales
2003	Elephants, Bulls, Cobras	0–3	Lions, Whales
2004	Elephants, Whales, Bears	11–3	Bulls, Lions, Cobras
2005	Elephants, Whales, Cobras	5–2	Bulls, Lions, Bears
2006	Elephants, Whales, Cobras	3–3	Bulls, Lions, Bears
2007	Elephants, Whales, Cobras	11–3	Bulls, Lions, Bears
2008	Elephants, T-REX, Whales	10–6	Bulls, Lions, Bears
2009	Elephants, Bulls	5–6	Lions, Bears
2010	Elephants, Bulls	4–6	Lions, Bears
2011	Elephants, Monkeys	6–4	Lions, Bulls
2012	Elephants, Monkeys	8–9	Lions, Bulls
2013	Monkeys, Rhinos	7–11	Elephants, Lions
2014	Lions, Brother	7–12	Rhinos, Monkeys
2015	Lions, Rhinos	2–1	Brothers, Monkeys
2016	Monkeys, Lions	8–6	Brothers, Rhinos
2017	Rookie	8–9	Veteran
2018	Monkeys, Guardians	7–8	Lions, Brothers
2019	Chinese Taipei	8–8; 1–4	CPBL All-Star Team
2020	Not held due to the COVID-19 pandemic		
2021	Not held due to the COVID-19 pandemic		
2022	Chinese Taipei	1–3; 2–3	CPBL All-Star Team
2023	Chinese Taipei	0–5; 3–6	CPBL All-Star Team
2024	Chinese Taipei	3–2; 4–1	CPBL All-Star Team
2025	Chinese Taipei	7–5; 0–0 (Note: Home Run Derby Tiebreaker ended 2–1)	CPBL All-Star Team

== See also ==
- Chinese Professional Baseball League
- CPBL Home Run Derby
- Taiwan Series
- Baseball awards#Taiwan
