= Hsu Ming-chieh =

Taiwanese baseball player and coach

Hsu Ming-Chieh
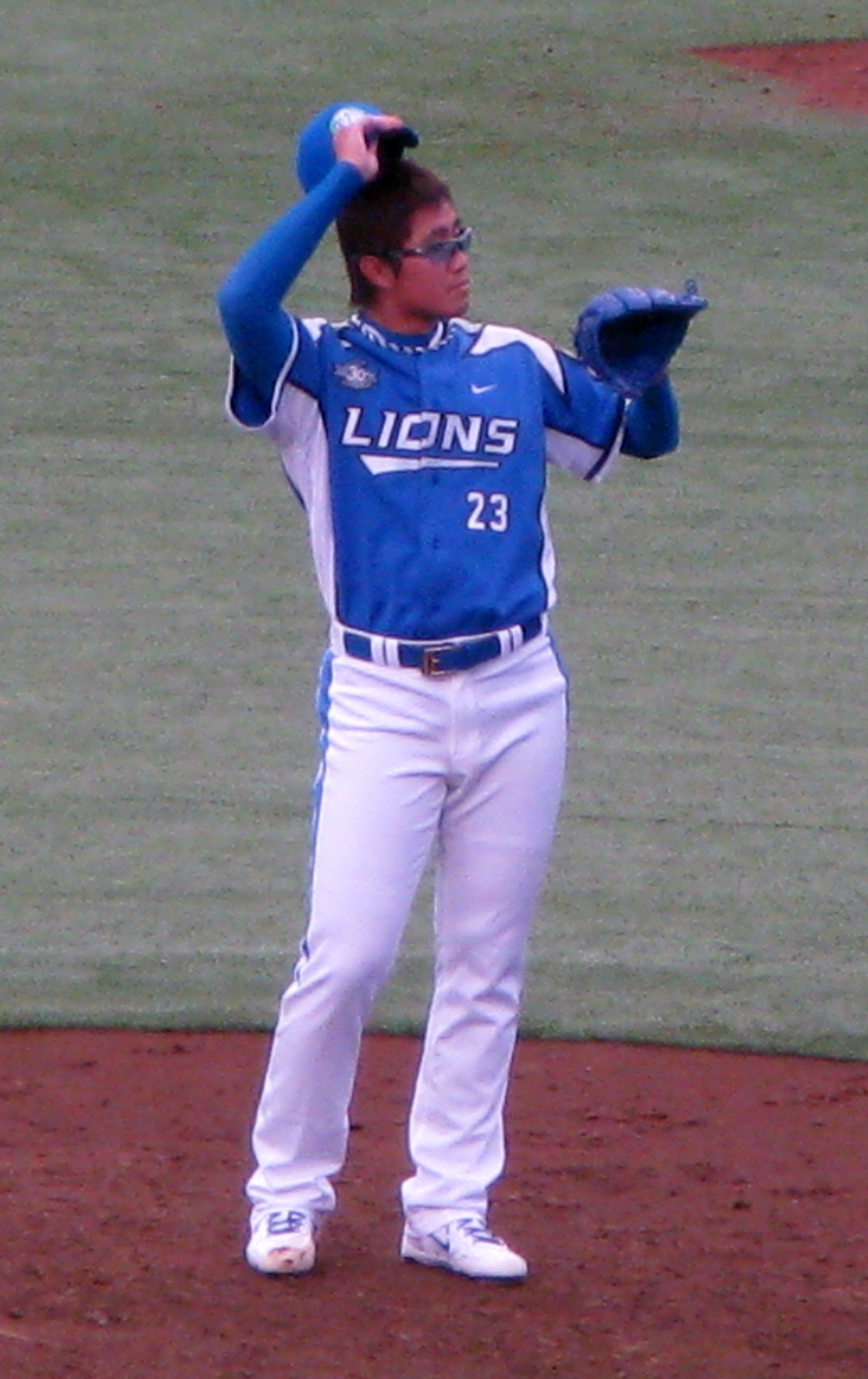

Fubon Guardians – No. 91
- Pitcher / Coach
- Born: December 1, 1976 (age 49)
- Bats: Right Throws: Right

NPB debut
- April 2, 2000, for the Seibu Lions

NPB statistics (through 2013)
- Win–loss record: 49-49
- ERA: 4.20
- Strikeouts: 476
- Stats at Baseball Reference

Teams
- As player: Taichung Agan (1998–1999); Seibu Lions/Saitama Seibu Lions (2000–2011); Orix Buffaloes (2012–2013); Lamigo Monkeys (2014–2015); Chinatrust Brothers (2016); As coach: Chinatrust Brothers (2017); Saitama Seibu Lions (2018–2020); Rakuten Monkeys (2021–2024); Fubon Guardians (2025–present)

Career highlights and awards
- 1× NPB All-Star (2001)

Hsu Ming-chieh (Chinese: 許銘傑; pinyin: Xǔ Míngjié; Wade–Giles: Hsu^{3} Ming^{2}-chieh^{2}; born 1 December 1976) is a Taiwanese former professional baseball pitcher. He previously played for Nippon Professional Baseball's Saitama Seibu Lions and Orix Buffaloes. He is known for his Shuuto (two-seamer).

== Early life ==
Hsu was raised in southern Taiwan and joined his school baseball team in elementary school. At the age of 12, he participated in the 1989 Little League World Series while playing for Kang-Tu Little League. Kang-Tu lost the series to a team from Trumbull, Connecticut.

== Professional career ==
In 1998, Hsu joined Taichung Agan, a baseball club in the now-defunct Taiwan Major League. His outstanding performance with Agan in the 1998 and 1999 seasons has been compared with Daisuke Matsuzaka by the Taiwanese media.

In 2000, he joined the Seibu Lions of the Pacific League in Japan. In 2012, after 12 seasons with the Lions, he moved to the Orix Buffaloes, where he played 2 seasons.

In 2014, he returned to Taiwan, playing for the Lamigo Monkeys in the Chinese Professional Baseball League.

== International experience ==
Hsu has participated in many International baseball events.

- 1989: Little League World Series
- 1995: Asian Baseball Championship
- 1995: Intercontinental Cup
- 1997: Asian Baseball Championship
- 1998: Bangkok Asian Games
- 1999: Asian Baseball Championship
- 2001: Baseball World Cup
- 2003: Asian Baseball Championship
- 2007: Baseball World Cup
- 2007: Asian Baseball Championship

== See also ==
- Chinese Taipei national baseball team
