= Hsinchu Baseball Stadium =

Baseball stadium in Hsinchu, Taiwan

- 新竹市立棒球場
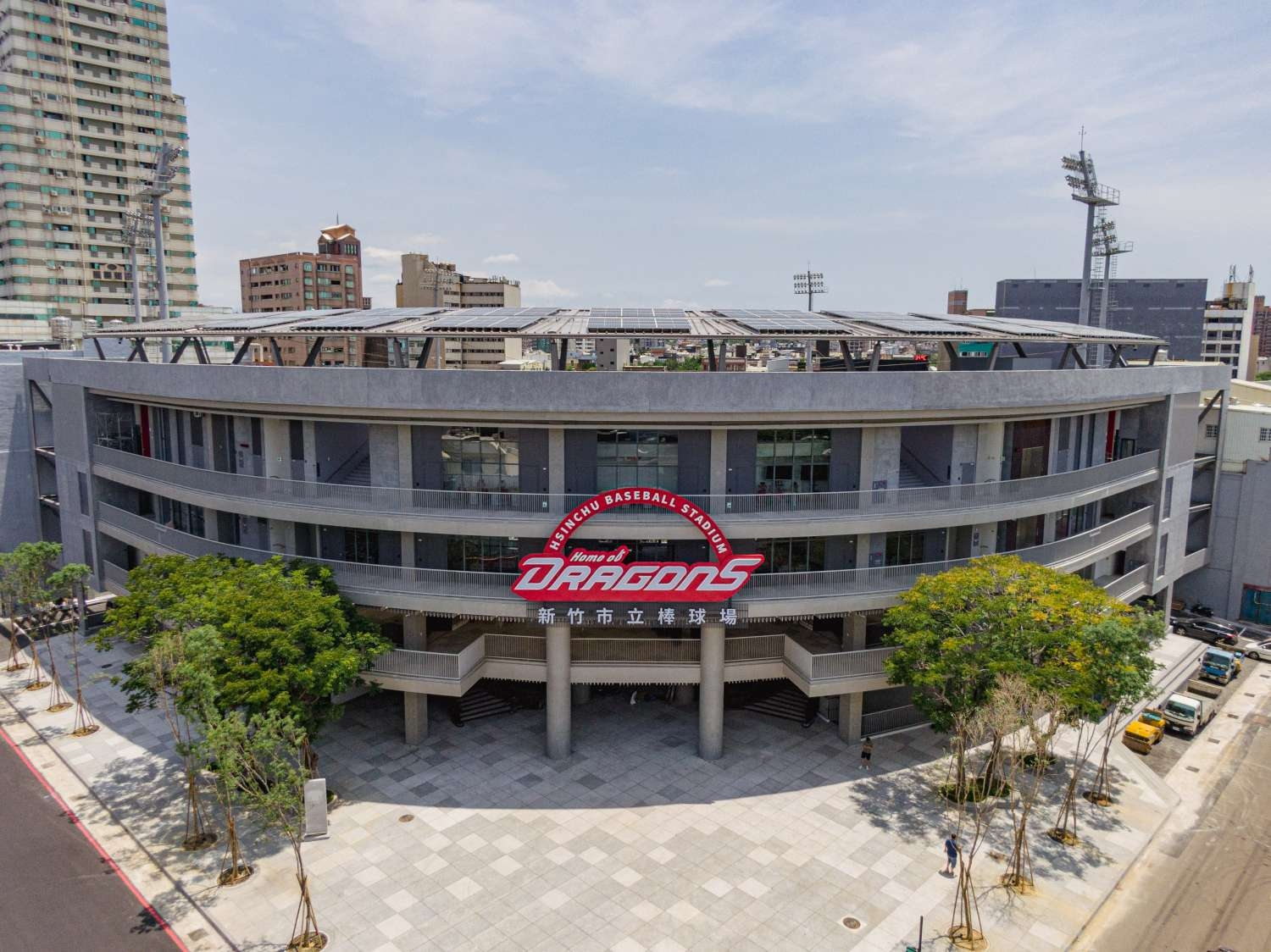
- Baseball Stadium front in 2022
- Interactive map of Hsinchu Baseball Stadium
- Location: North, Hsinchu City, Taiwan
- Coordinates: 24°48′23.8″N 120°57′39.4″E
- Capacity: 15,000
- Type: stadium
- Surface: Natural turf and red clay
- Field size: Left Field - 330 ft (100.584 m); Center Field - 400 ft (121.92 m); Right Field - 330 ft (100.584 m)

Construction
- Opened: 27 November 1976
- Renovated: 2021
- Reopened: 22 July 2022

Tenant
- Wei Chuan Dragons

Hsinchu Baseball Stadium (traditional Chinese: 新竹市立棒球場; simplified Chinese: 新竹市立棒球场; pinyin: Xīnzhú Shìlì Bàngqiú Chǎng) is a baseball stadium in North District, Hsinchu City, Taiwan. It hosted occasional games for Taichung Agan and Taipei Gida in the defunct Taiwan Major League. The stadium is now the ball park for Wei Chuan Dragons of the Chinese Professional Baseball League.

== History ==
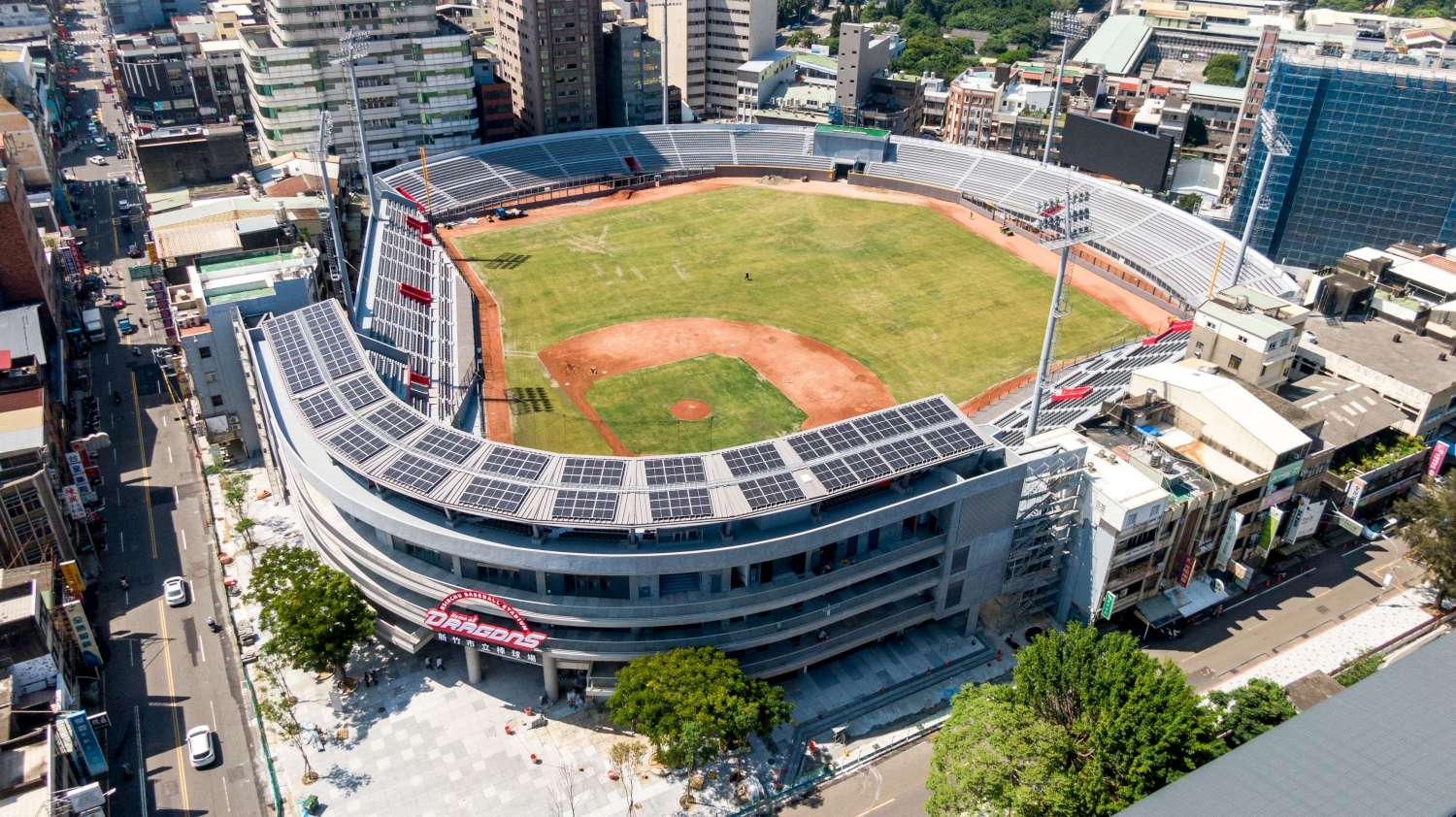
Stadium aerial photograph after the renovation in 2022

Originally it was to be named as the Hsinchu Sadaharu Oh Baseball Stadium (Chinese: 新竹縣立王貞治棒球場), after Sadaharu Oh, the famed baseball player; however, during its construction then-President Chiang Kai-shek died, and the stadium was renamed Hsinchu Chung-Cheng Baseball Stadium (Chinese: 新竹縣立中正棒球場) in his honor.

References to Chiang were dropped after the renovation in 2022. Inaugurated on 27 November 1976, the stadium has been in use ever since. The stadium renovation commenced in 2019, and construction was estimated to finish by the end of 2021, in time for the Wei Chuan Dragons' 2022 season.

== Renovation controversy ==
On 22 July 2022, the Hsinchu Baseball Stadium held its first game after NT$1.2 billion in renovations. The Wei Chuan Dragons hosted the Fubon Guardians in the opening game of the second half of the 2022 Chinese Professional Baseball League (CPBL) season. President Tsai Ing-wen, CPBL President Tsai Chi-chang, Hsinchu Mayor Lin Chih-chien, and Vice Mayor Shen Hui-hung were in attendance.

Controversy surrounding the renovation soon followed, when several players were injured in games on the 22nd and 23rd. In one case, Fubon Guardians outfielder Lin Che-hsuan tore his left shoulder labrum when he dived to catch a fly ball. He underwent surgery and was expected to be back in eight months. The Hsinchu City Government was criticized for serious defects in the baseball field, which caused the injuries. The city admitted that it had sold tickets and reopened the stadium before final inspections were complete. On 7 December, the city announced that repairs had been completed.

On 5 January 2023, the newly elected mayor, Ann Kao, held a press conference about the stadium's issues. She said that the field was prone to waterlogging and that there was trash underneath the dirt. She said that it would be difficult to fix quickly, so the stadium would not compete to host the official warm-up series of the 2023 World Baseball Classic. Kao emphasized that prosecutors had already opened an investigation. She said that her administration was fully cooperating with the investigation and that they had already discovered many points of concern. She said that, whether or not there had been negligence or even wrongdoing, the city would cooperate with the investigation.

== See also ==
- List of stadiums in Taiwan
- Sport in Taiwan
