= 2001 Baseball World Cup =

- Poster of the tournament

Tournament details
- Country: Taiwan
- Dates: 6–18 November
- Teams: 16

Final positions
- Champions: Cuba (23rd title)
- Runners-up: United States
- Third place: Chinese Taipei
- Fourth place: Japan

Tournament statistics
- Games played: 68

Awards
- MVP: (Cuba) Luis Ulacia

The 2001 Baseball World Cup (BWC) was the 34th international Men's amateur baseball tournament. The tournament was sanctioned by the International Baseball Federation, which titled it the Amateur World Series from the 1938 tournament through the 1986 AWS. The tournament was held, for the first time, in Taiwan, from 6 to 18 November. Cuba defeated the United States in the final, winning its 23rd title.

There were 16 participating countries, split into two groups, with the first four of each group qualifying for the finals.

The next five competitions were also held as the BWC tournament, which was replaced in 2015 by the quadrennial WBSC Premier12.

== Venues ==
Taipei	2001 Baseball World Cup is located in Taiwan	New Taipei City
Tianmu Stadium	2001 Baseball World Cup is located in Taiwan	Xinzhuang Stadium
Capacity: 10,500	2001 Baseball World Cup is located in Taiwan	Capacity: 12,500
Kaohsiung	2001 Baseball World Cup is located in Taiwan	Chiayi
Kaohsiung Stadium	2001 Baseball World Cup is located in Taiwan	Chiayi Stadium
Capacity: 19,907	2001 Baseball World Cup is located in Taiwan	Capacity: 10,000

== First round ==
=== Group A ===
Pos	Team	Pld	W	L	RF	RA	RD	PCT	GB	Qualification
1	Chinese Taipei (H)	7	6	1	38	13	+25	.857	—	Advance to Knockout stage
2	United States	7	5	2	52	9	+43	.714	1	Advance to Knockout stage
3	Dominican Republic	7	5	2	38	26	+12	.714	1	Advance to Knockout stage
4	South Korea	7	5	2	43	18	+25	.714	1	Advance to Knockout stage
5	Nicaragua	7	4	3	33	28	+5	.571	2	
6	Italy	7	2	5	22	37	−15	.286	4	
7	South Africa	7	1	6	13	57	−44	.143	5	
8	France	7	0	7	7	58	−51	.000	6	

Source: IBAF
(H) Hosts

6 November 2001; 18:00 (UTC+8)	Italy	1 – 6	Chinese Taipei	Tianmu Stadium, Tianmu
6 November 2001; 18:00 (UTC+8)		Boxscore		Tianmu Stadium, Tianmu

7 November 2001; 12:00 (UTC+8)	Nicaragua	5 – 1	France	Kaohsiung Stadium, Kaohsiung
7 November 2001; 12:00 (UTC+8)		Boxscore		Kaohsiung Stadium, Kaohsiung

7 November 2001; 15:00 (UTC+8)	South Africa	0 – 2	South Korea	Chiayi Stadium, Chiayi
7 November 2001; 15:00 (UTC+8)		Boxscore		Chiayi Stadium, Chiayi

7 November 2001; 18:00 (UTC+8)	United States	4 – 6	Dominican Republic	Kaohsiung Stadium, Kaohsiung
7 November 2001; 18:00 (UTC+8)		Boxscore		Kaohsiung Stadium, Kaohsiung

8 November 2001; 12:00 (UTC+8)	France	0 – 10 (F/7)	Chinese Taipei	Chiayi Stadium, Chiayi
8 November 2001; 12:00 (UTC+8)		Boxscore		Chiayi Stadium, Chiayi

8 November 2001; 12:00 (UTC+8)	South Africa	0 – 5	United States	Kaohsiung Stadium, Kaohsiung
8 November 2001; 12:00 (UTC+8)		Boxscore		Kaohsiung Stadium, Kaohsiung

8 November 2001; 18:00 (UTC+8)	Nicaragua	4 – 8	Dominican Republic	Chiayi Stadium, Chiayi
8 November 2001; 18:00 (UTC+8)		Boxscore		Chiayi Stadium, Chiayi

8 November 2001; 18:00 (UTC+8)	South Korea	10 – 0	Italy	Kaohsiung Stadium, Kaohsiung
8 November 2001; 18:00 (UTC+8)		Boxscore		Kaohsiung Stadium, Kaohsiung

9 November 2001; 12:00 (UTC+8)	Dominican Republic	3 – 1	France	Chiayi Stadium, Chiayi
9 November 2001; 12:00 (UTC+8)		Boxscore		Chiayi Stadium, Chiayi

9 November 2001; 12:00 (UTC+8)	Italy	11 – 2	South Africa	Kaohsiung Stadium, Kaohsiung
9 November 2001; 12:00 (UTC+8)		Boxscore		Kaohsiung Stadium, Kaohsiung

9 November 2001; 18:00 (UTC+8)	United States	11 – 0	South Korea	Chiayi Stadium, Chiayi
9 November 2001; 18:00 (UTC+8)		Boxscore		Chiayi Stadium, Chiayi

9 November 2001; 18:00 (UTC+8)	Chinese Taipei	4 – 2	Nicaragua	Kaohsiung Stadium, Kaohsiung
9 November 2001; 18:00 (UTC+8)		Boxscore		Kaohsiung Stadium, Kaohsiung

10 November 2001; 12:00 (UTC+8)	Italy	3 – 5	Dominican Republic	Chiayi Stadium, Chiayi
10 November 2001; 12:00 (UTC+8)		Boxscore		Chiayi Stadium, Chiayi

10 November 2001; 12:00 (UTC+8)	Chinese Taipei	8 – 2	South Africa	Kaohsiung Stadium, Kaohsiung
10 November 2001; 12:00 (UTC+8)		Boxscore		Kaohsiung Stadium, Kaohsiung

10 November 2001; 18:00 (UTC+8)	Nicaragua	3 – 1	United States	Chiayi Stadium, Chiayi
10 November 2001; 18:00 (UTC+8)		Boxscore		Chiayi Stadium, Chiayi

10 November 2001; 18:00 (UTC+8)	France	1 – 14 (F/7)	South Korea	Kaohsiung Stadium, Kaohsiung
10 November 2001; 18:00 (UTC+8)		Boxscore		Kaohsiung Stadium, Kaohsiung

11 November 2001; 12:00 (UTC+8)	South Africa	0 – 13 (F/7)	Nicaragua	Chiayi Stadium, Chiayi
11 November 2001; 12:00 (UTC+8)		Boxscore		Chiayi Stadium, Chiayi

11 November 2001; 12:00 (UTC+8)	France	1 – 5	Italy	Kaohsiung Stadium, Kaohsiung
11 November 2001; 12:00 (UTC+8)		Boxscore		Kaohsiung Stadium, Kaohsiung

11 November 2001; 18:00 (UTC+8)	Dominican Republic	0 – 4	South Korea	Chiayi Stadium, Chiayi
11 November 2001; 18:00 (UTC+8)		Boxscore		Chiayi Stadium, Chiayi

11 November 2001; 18:00 (UTC+8)	Chinese Taipei	0 – 6	United States	Kaohsiung Stadium, Kaohsiung
11 November 2001; 18:00 (UTC+8)		Boxscore		Kaohsiung Stadium, Kaohsiung

13 November 2001; 12:00 (UTC+8)	Dominican Republic	1 – 5	Chinese Taipei	Chiayi Stadium, Chiayi
13 November 2001; 12:00 (UTC+8)		Boxscore		Chiayi Stadium, Chiayi

13 November 2001; 12:00 (UTC+8)	France	3 – 4 (F/13)	South Africa	Kaohsiung Stadium, Kaohsiung
13 November 2001; 12:00 (UTC+8)		Boxscore		Kaohsiung Stadium, Kaohsiung

13 November 2001; 18:00 (UTC+8)	South Korea	12 – 1 (F/7)	Nicaragua	Chiayi Stadium, Chiayi
13 November 2001; 18:00 (UTC+8)		Boxscore		Chiayi Stadium, Chiayi

13 November 2001; 18:00 (UTC+8)	Italy	0 – 8	United States	Kaohsiung Stadium, Kaohsiung
13 November 2001; 18:00 (UTC+8)		Boxscore		Kaohsiung Stadium, Kaohsiung

14 November 2001; 12:00 (UTC+8)	South Africa	5 – 15 (F/7)	Dominican Republic	Chiayi Stadium, Chiayi
14 November 2001; 12:00 (UTC+8)		Boxscore		Chiayi Stadium, Chiayi

14 November 2001; 12:00 (UTC+8)	United States	17 – 0 (F/7)	France	Kaohsiung Stadium, Kaohsiung
14 November 2001; 12:00 (UTC+8)		Boxscore		Kaohsiung Stadium, Kaohsiung

14 November 2001; 18:00 (UTC+8)	Nicaragua	5 – 2	Italy	Chiayi Stadium, Chiayi
14 November 2001; 18:00 (UTC+8)		Boxscore		Chiayi Stadium, Chiayi

14 November 2001; 18:00 (UTC+8)	South Korea	1 – 5	Chinese Taipei	Kaohsiung Stadium, Kaohsiung
14 November 2001; 18:00 (UTC+8)		Boxscore		Kaohsiung Stadium, Kaohsiung

=== Group B ===
Pos	Team	Pld	W	L	RF	RA	RD	PCT	GB	Qualification
1	Japan	7	7	0	68	10	+58	1.000	—	Advance to Knockout stage
2	Cuba	7	6	1	59	14	+45	.857	1	Advance to Knockout stage
3	Panama	7	5	2	28	27	+1	.714	2	Advance to Knockout stage
4	Netherlands	7	4	3	45	19	+26	.571	3	Advance to Knockout stage
5	Australia	7	3	4	24	32	−8	.429	4	
6	Canada	7	2	5	21	18	+3	.286	5	
7	Russia	7	1	6	13	66	−53	.143	6	
8	Philippines	7	0	7	7	79	−72	.000	7	

Source: IBAF

== Knockout stage ==
Quarter-finals
Cuba	3
Dominican Republic	1
Japan	3
South Korea	1
United States	7
Panama	2
Chinese Taipei	2
Netherlands	0

Semi-finals
Cuba	3
Japan	1
United States	4
Chinese Taipei	1

Final
Cuba	5
United States	3
Third place
Japan	0
Chinese Taipei	3

5th–8th place
Dominican Republic	2
South Korea	3
Panama	5
Netherlands	0

Fifth place
South Korea	2
Panama	3
Seventh place
Dominican Republic	3
Netherlands	7

== Final standings ==
Pos	Team	W	L
	Cuba	9	1
	United States	7	3
	Chinese Taipei	8	2.
4	Japan	8	2
5	Panama	7	3
6	South Korea	6	4
7	Netherlands	5	5
8	Dominican Republic	5	5
9	Nicaragua	4	3
10	Australia	3	4
11	Canada	2	5
12	Italy	2	5
13	South Africa	1	6
14	Russia	1	6
15	France	0	7
16	Philippines	0	7

== Awards ==
Tournament Awards
Award	Player
MVP	(Cuba) Luis Ulacia
Leading hitter	(Cuba) Luis Ulacia
Pitcher with best ERA	(France) Samuel Meurant
Pitcher with best win/loss average	(Chinese Taipei) Chang Chih-chia
Most Runs batted in	(Chinese Taipei) Chin-Feng Chen
Most Runs batted in	(Dominican Republic) Yohanny Valera
Most Home runs	(Netherlands) Evert-Jan 't Hoen
Most Stolen bases	(Netherlands) Ralph Milliard
Most Runs scored	(Japan) Yoshinobu Takahashi
Outstanding defensive player	(Canada) Kevin Nicholson

All Star Team
Position	Player
Pitchers	(Cuba) José Contreras
Pitchers	(United States) Jason Stanford
Catcher	(United States) Ken Huckaby
First base	(Cuba) Orestes Kindelán
Second base	(Cuba) Antonio Pacheco
Third base	(Japan) Akihiro Higashide
Shortstop	(Japan) Hirokazu Ibata
Outfield	(Chinese Taipei) Chin-Feng Chen
Outfield	(United States) Mark Budzinski
Outfield	(Japan) Yoshinobu Takahashi
Designated hitter	(Chinese Taipei) Chuan-Chia Wang

== See also ==
- List of sporting events in Taiwan
