= Sil Campusano =

Dominican baseball player (born 1965)

- Center fielder / Coach
- Born: December 31, 1965 (age 60); Santo Domingo, Dominican Republic
- Batted: Right Threw: Right

Professional debut
- MLB: April 4, 1988, for the Toronto Blue Jays
- CPBL: March 18, 1994, for the Wei Chuan Dragons

Last appearance
- MLB: July 6, 1991, for the Philadelphia Phillies
- CPBL: October 12, 1996, for the Wei Chuan Dragons

MLB statistics
- Batting average: .202
- Home runs: 5
- Runs batted in: 23

CPBL statistics
- Batting average: .297
- Home runs: 65
- Runs batted in: 209
- Stats at Baseball Reference

Teams
- Toronto Blue Jays (1988); Philadelphia Phillies (1990–1991); Wei Chuan Dragons (1994–1996); Chiayi-Tainan Luka (1997–1999)

Career highlights and awards
- CPBL home run champion (1994); CPBL best nine (1996)

Silvestre Diaz Campusano (born December 31, 1965) is a Dominican former professional baseball center fielder and coach. He played in Major League Baseball (MLB) for the Toronto Blue Jays and Philadelphia Phillies, and in the Chinese Professional Baseball League (CPBL) for the Wei Chuan Dragons. Campusano batted and threw right-handed.

== Early life ==
Campusano grew up in the Santo Domingo suburb of Manoguayabo, along with Ramón Martínez and Juan Guzmán; together, they paved the pathway for MLB Hall of Famer Pedro Martínez to play for the Dominican Professional Baseball League (LIDOM) Tigres del Licey.

== Playing career ==
=== Major league baseball ===
Campusano was signed by the Dominican scout Epy Guerrero, as an international free agent, for the Toronto Blue Jays, in 1983. He was ranked as one of Baseball America's top prospects, from 1986 to 1988.

Campusano‘s MLB debut was with the Blue Jays, in the 1988 season. He played 79 games (G), with 142 at bats (AB), 31 hits (H), 14 runs scored (R), 2 home runs (HR), and 12 runs batted in (RBI). Campusano was relegated to playing the entire 1989 season for the Blue Jays’ Triple-A Minor League Baseball (MiLB) affiliate in Syracuse.

Then, on December 4, 1989, Campusano was drafted by the Philadelphia Phillies in the 1989 Rule 5 draft. His entire 1990 season was spent with the Philadelphia MLB squad, where he posted 18 H, in 85 AB, 66 G, with 2 HR (again), and 9 RBI. Returning for a second year with the Phillies (1991), he played mostly for their Triple-A affiliate, the Scranton/Wilkes-Barre Red Barons. That season was to be Campusano’s last in the big leagues, with only 15 MLB game appearances.

For Phillies fans, Campusano is perhaps best remembered as a light-hitting reserve player, who broke up Pittsburgh Pirate Doug Drabek's no-hitter, on August 3, 1990. Campusano said of the event that he did not feel nervous or any pressure going into the at bat.

=== Dominican winter league ===
Campusano played for Tigres del Licey, in the Dominican Republic, for 11 years, going undefeated in winning the 1991 Caribbean Series title, while also capturing the 1994 Caribbean Series championship. He led the league in doubles (1991–1992) and runs (1992–1993). In 1993–1994, he was the league leader in runs, home runs, and walks, batted for the cycle (in the final series), and was named Most Valuable Player (MVP).

=== Later career ===
After leaving MLB, Campusano enjoyed a prosperous career in CPBL. While playing for the Wei Chuan Dragons (1994–1996), he won the 1994 HR championship. Campusano also played for the Chiayi-Tainan Luka (1997–1999), winning the 1997 Taiwan Major League title.

Campusano ended his career in the Mexican League, acting as a player/manager, with the Langosteros de Cancún, in 2000.

== Coaching career ==
From 2013 to 2014, Campusano served as the hitting coach for the Tigres del Licey.

On July 22, 2025, Campusano was hired as part of the coaching staff for the Algodoneros de Unión Laguna of the Mexican League. On October 7, Campusano was fired by the Algodoneros.
