= Chiayi-Tainan Luka =

Taiwanese professional baseball team

The Chiayi-Tainan Luka (嘉南勇士; literally "Chianan Braves") or abbreviated Chianan Luka was a professional baseball team in the Taiwan Major League (TML) that existed from 1997 to 2002. The team's home field included Chiayi County Baseball Stadium (not to be confused with Chiayi Baseball Field used by its CPBL then counterpart Chinatrust Whales) and Tainan Baseball Field. Except for winning championship in TML's first season in 1997, this team did not perform well throughout its history and it only ever attracted corporate sponsors in 2000 and 2001. As a result, this team used its home cities' names as its name for most of its existence rather than a company's name. After TML merged with the Chinese Professional Baseball League (CPBL) in 2003, this team merged with Taichung Agan and exchanged its name with Taipei Gida (later became Macoto Gida), which was further changed to Macoto Cobras since 2004.

== Regular season records ==
Year	Win	Loss	Tie	Rank	Win–loss %
1997	53	42	1	1	.558
1998	57	48	3	2	.543
1999	40	42	2	3	.488
2000	37	45	2	3	.451
2001	13	47	0	4	.217
2002	29	41	2	4	.414
Total	229	265	10		.464

- TML Championships: once, 1997

== Notable former players ==
- Silvestre Campusano, Dominican former MLB player and coach in Mexican and Dominican leagues
- Gavin Fingleson, South African-born Australian, Olympic silver medalist, baseball player with teams in Australia and United States
- Paul Gonzalez, US born Australian – 2004 Athens Olympics Silver Medal, retired professional player in Australia, Japan and United States
- Carlos Mirabal, US born retired professional player in Japan, Taiwan and United States
- Hisanobu Watanabe, Japanese former professional player and coach

== Home field ==
Chiayi County Baseball Stadium 嘉義縣立棒球場
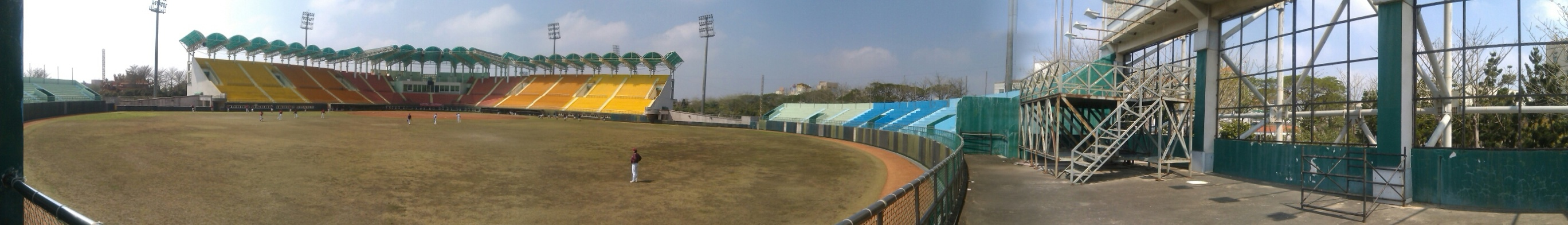
- Interactive map of Chiayi County Baseball Stadium 嘉義縣立棒球場
- Location: Xianghe 2nd Road, Taibao City, Taiwan
- Coordinates: 23.456580°N 120.292500°E
- Owner: Chiayi County Government
- Operator: Chiayi County
- Capacity: 9,000
- Surface: Natural turf and clay
- Field size: Left Field – 322 ft Center Field – 403 ft Right Field – 322 ft

Construction
- Opened: 1996

Tenants
- Chiayi-Tainan Luka (1997-2002); Spring training facility for Rakuten Monkeys (2019-)

For the duration of their existence Chiayi-Tainan Luka called Chiayi County Baseball Stadium home. The baseball park opened in 1999 and is owned by Chiayi County Government. Located in Taibao City, it is often mistaken for Chiayi City Municipal Baseball Stadium, which displaced the County stadium following renovations in 1998.

== See also ==
- Chinese Professional Baseball League
- Macoto Cobras
