= Liu Yu-chan =

Taiwanese baseball player

Brother Elephants – No. 20
- Pitcher
- Born: 20 December 1975 (age 50); Taitung County, Taiwan
- Bats: Right Throws: Right

CPBL debut
- 17 October, 1999, for the Chinatrust Whales

Career statistics (through 14 July 2009)
- Record: 14-20
- ERA: 4.15
- Strikeouts: 415
- Stats at Baseball Reference

Teams
- Chinatrust Whales (1999–2008); Brother Elephants (2009)

Liu Yu-chan (Chinese: 柳裕展; born 20 December 1975 in Taiwan) is a Taiwanese baseball player who played for the Brother Elephants of Chinese Professional Baseball League. He was a starting pitcher for the Elephants. He played for the Chinatrust Whales from 1999 to 2008. In the end of 2008, the Chinatrust Whales has disbanded, he was picked up by Brother Elephants in the second round of the redistribution draft.

== Career statistics ==
Season	Team	G	W	L	HD	SV	CG	SHO	BB	SO	ER	INN	ERA
1999	Chinatrust Whales	2	0	0	0	0	0	0	4	2	0	4.0	0.00
2000	Chinatrust Whales	43	2	4	0	3	0	0	46	63	30	80.0	3.38
2001	Chinatrust Whales	41	2	2	0	2	0	0	29	70	25	79.2	2.82
2002	Chinatrust Whales	26	0	1	0	0	0	0	21	29	26	31.1	7.47
2003	Chinatrust Whales	37	1	2	0	1	0	0	34	64	24	71.1	3.03
2004	Chinatrust Whales	7	0	2	0	0	0	0	7	20	13	19.1	6.05
2005	Chinatrust Whales	None Game
2006	Chinatrust Whales	35	0	0	3	1	0	0	22	34	17	42.1	3.61
2007	Chinatrust Whales	23	0	0	0	0	0	0	17	25	31	27.0	10.33
2008	Chinatrust Whales	48	6	3	6	0	0	0	36	70	25	75.2	2.97
2009	Brother Elephants	15	3	6	0	0	0	0	29	38	31	51.1	5.44
11 years		277	14	20	9	7	0	0	245	415	222	482.0	4.15

== See also ==
- Chinese Professional Baseball League
- Chinatrust Brothers
- Chinatrust Whales
