= Hualien Baseball Stadium =

Stadium in Hualien City, Hualien County, Taiwan

Coordinates: 24.0057774°N 121.5854359°E

- 花蓮縣立德興棒球場 (Chinese)
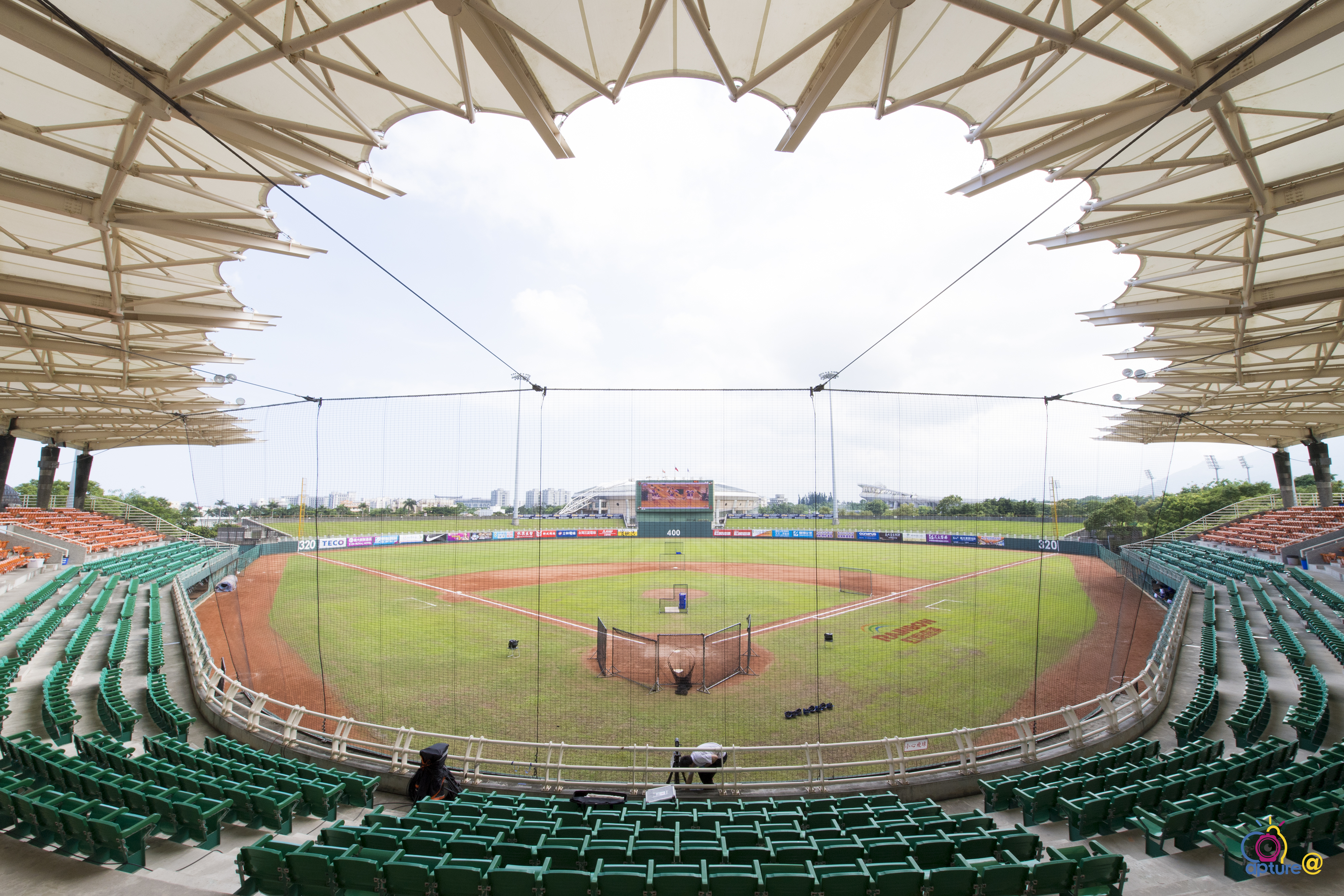
- Interactive map of Hualien Baseball Stadium
- Location: Hualien City, Hualien County, Taiwan
- Owner: Hualien
- Capacity: 5,500 (2001)
- Surface: grass
- Field size: Left Field Line - 320 ft Center Field - 400 ft Right Field Line - 320 ft

Construction
- Groundbreaking: 1999
- Opened: 2001

Hualien Baseball Stadium (Chinese: 花蓮縣立德興棒球場; pinyin: Huālián Xiànlì Déxìng Bàngqiúchǎng) is a baseball stadium located in Hualien City, Hualien County, Taiwan. Although it is relatively new compared to some other stadiums, its capacity and location do not allow frequent professional use, even though many baseball players came from this region.

Hualien Stadium is one of the very few stadiums that, instead of the usual outfield grandstand, have a grassed slope around the outfield as the spectators area.

== See also ==
- Chinese Professional Baseball League
- List of stadiums in Taiwan
- Sport in Taiwan
