= List of stadiums in Taiwan =

The following is a list of stadiums in Taiwan, ordered by capacity. Currently all stadiums with a capacity of 5,000 or more are included.

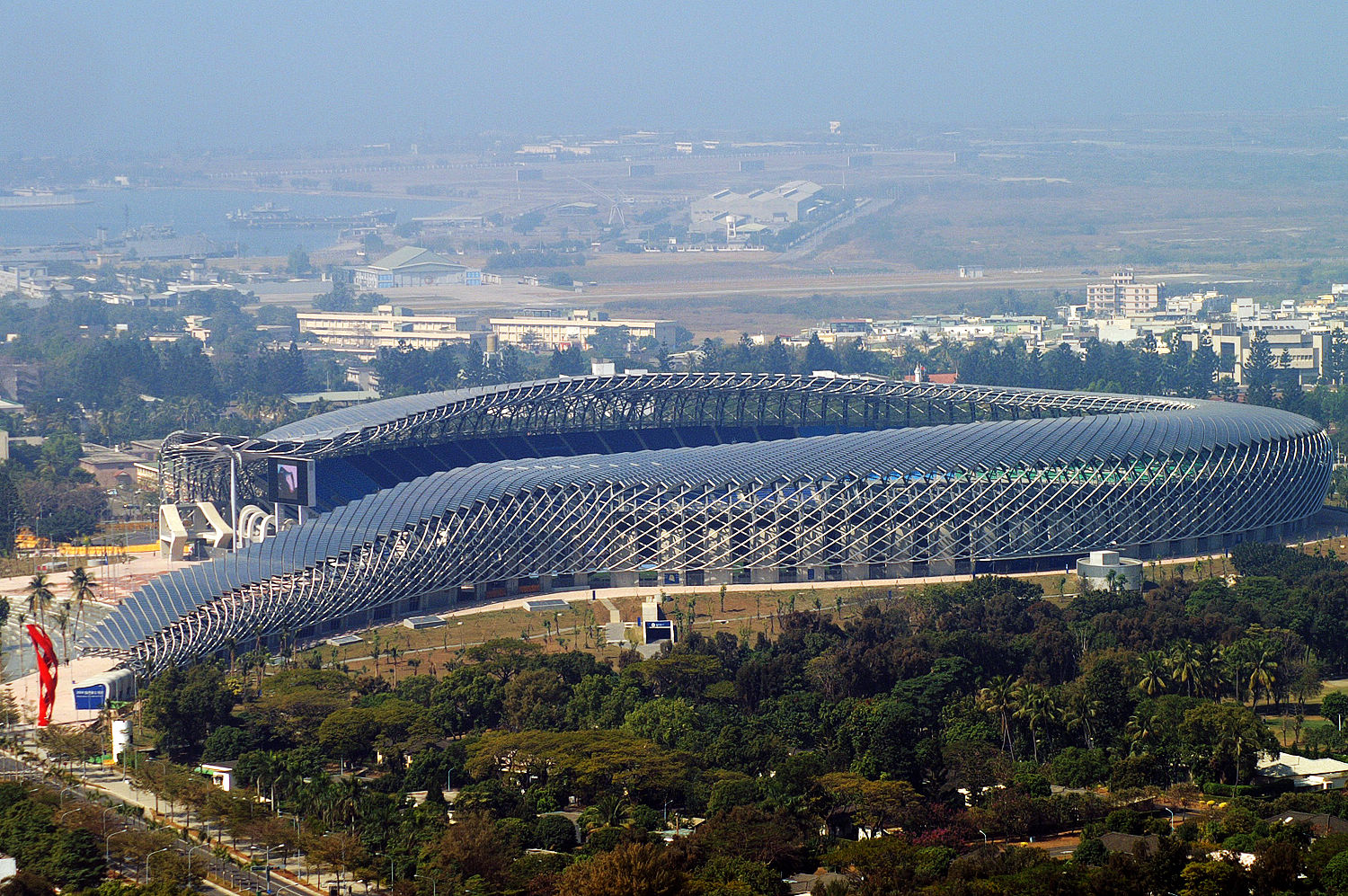
National Stadium

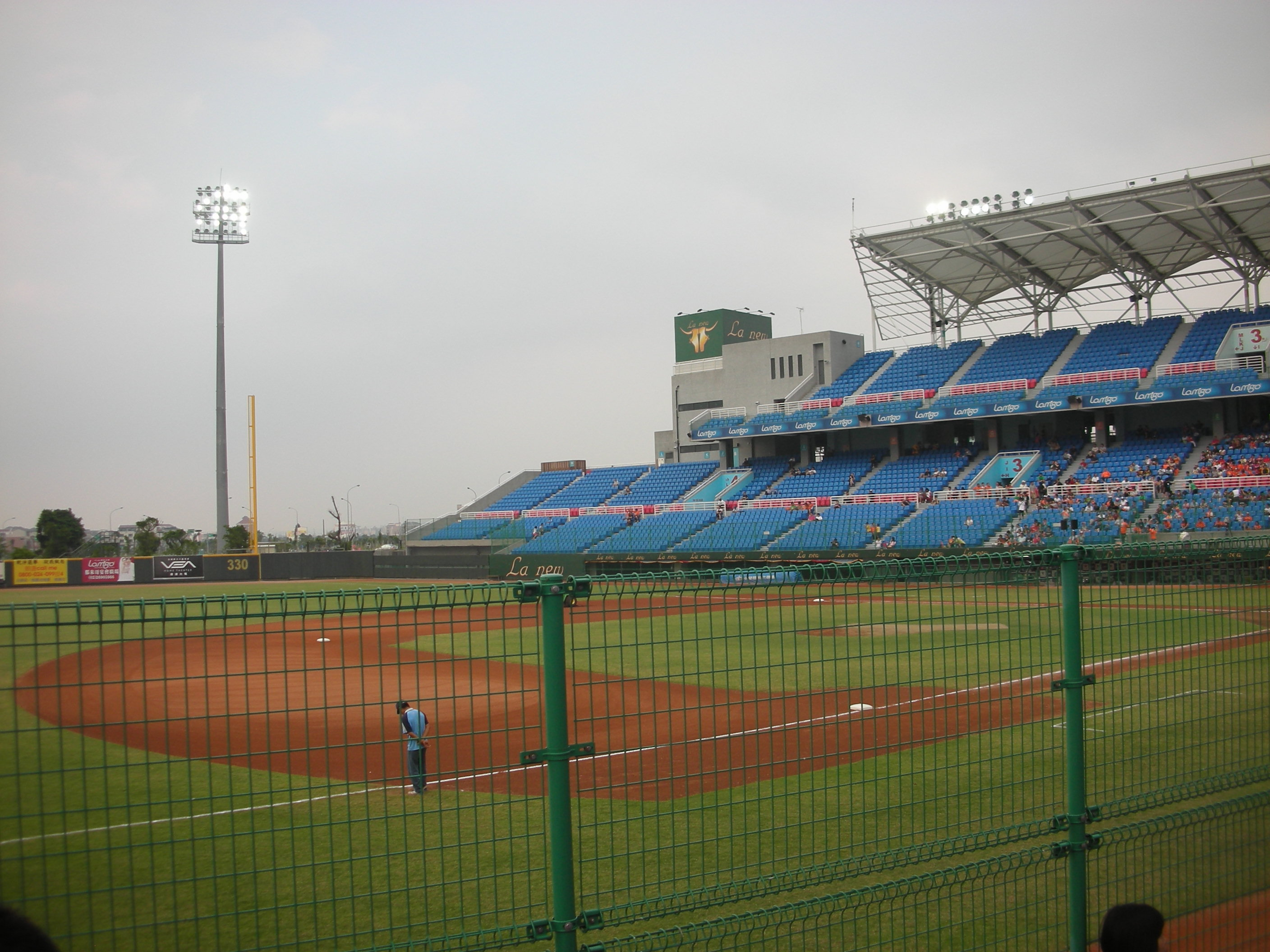
Rakuten Taoyuan Baseball Stadium

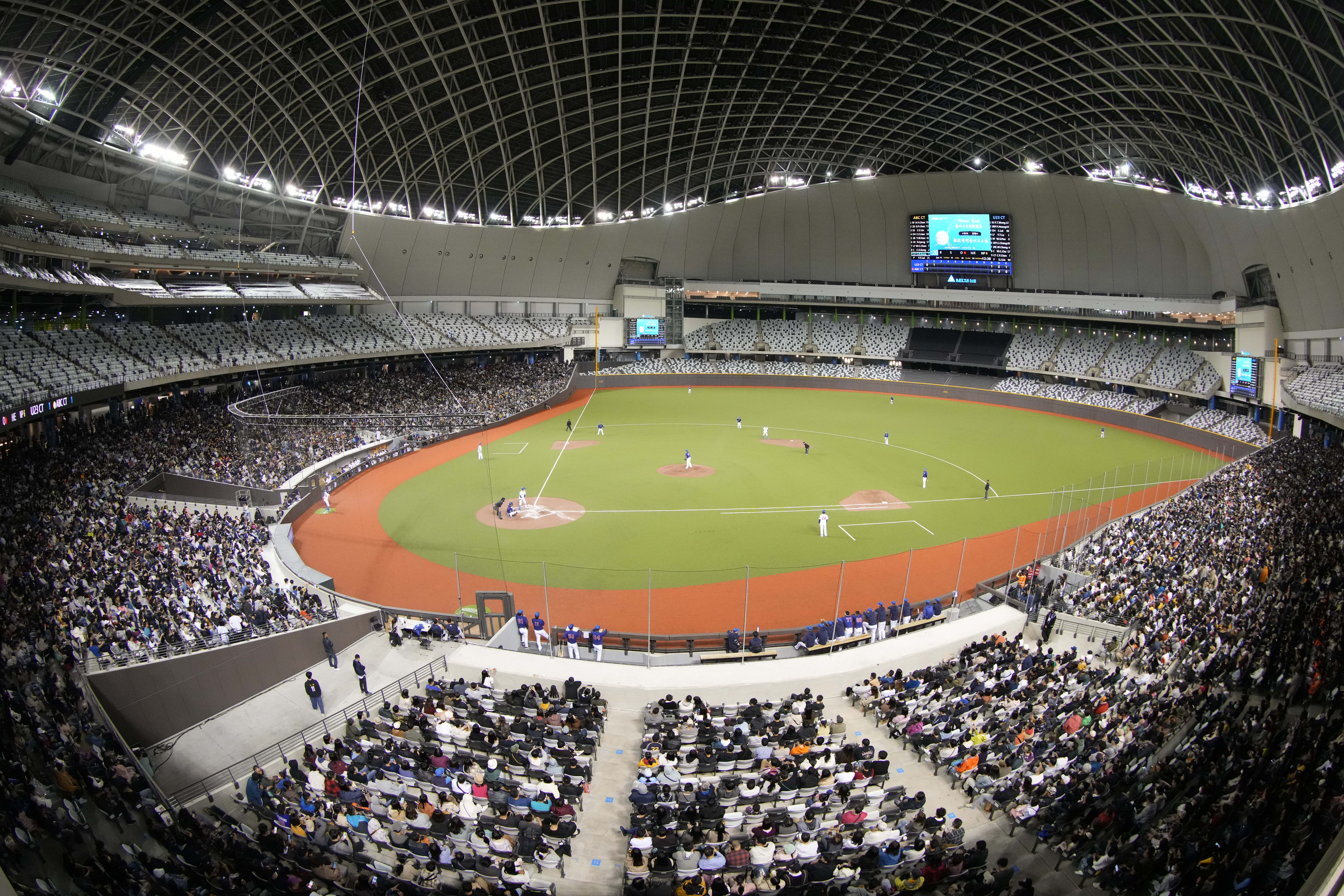
Taipei Dome

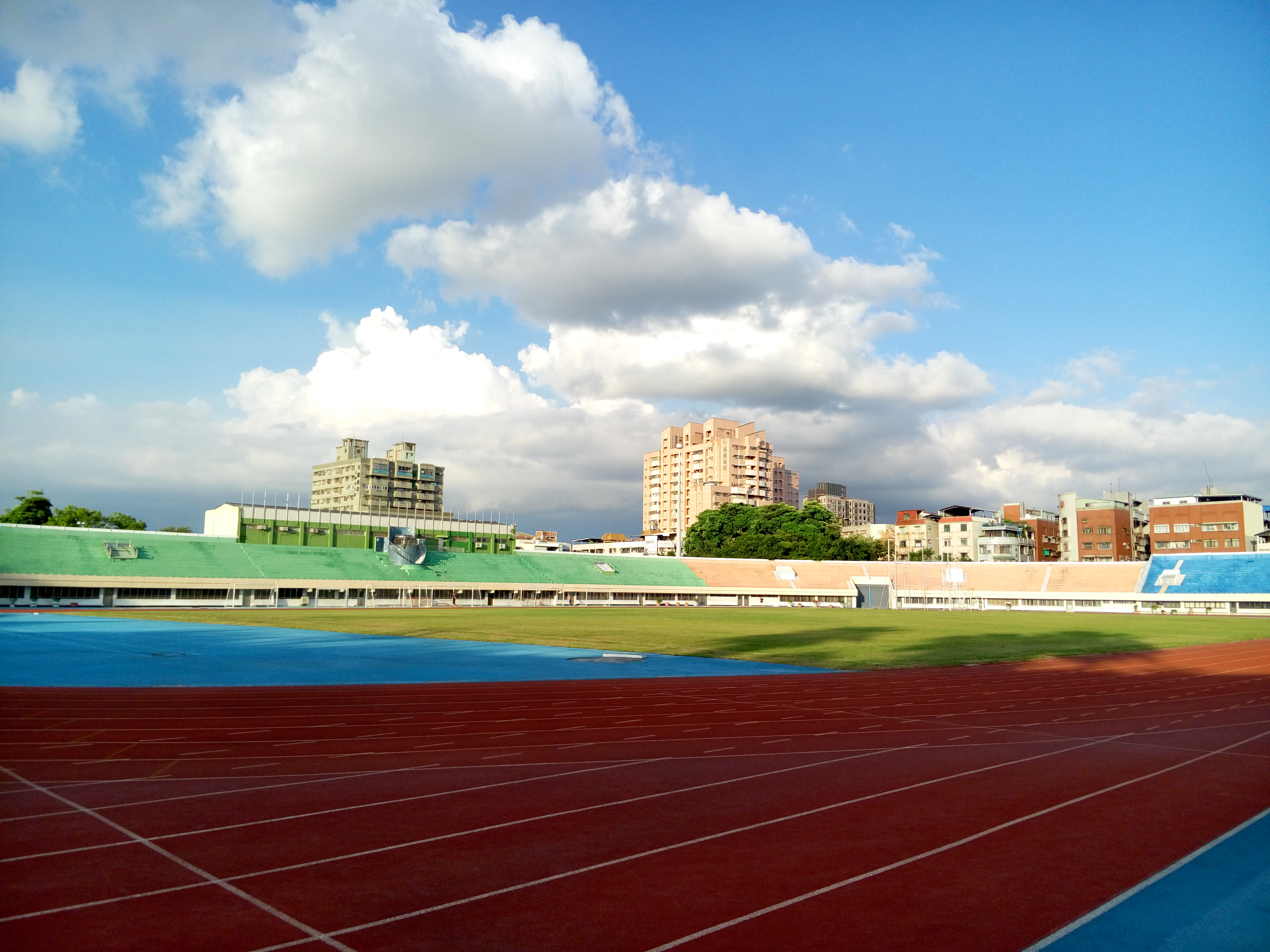
Fongshan Stadium

#	Stadium	Capacity	City	Type	Home team	sources
1	National Stadium	55,000	Kaohsiung	Football, Athletics	some Chinese Taipei national football team matches	
2	Taipei Dome	40,575	Taipei	Baseball, Softball	some Chinese Taipei national baseball team or Chinese Professional Baseball League (CPBL) matches	
3	Tainan Municipal Xinying Stadium	30,000	Tainan	Football, Athletics	some local teams matches	
=	Chungcheng Stadium	30,000	Kaohsiung	Athletics, Football	Most used in athletics events and some local teams matches	
=	Banqiao Stadium	30,000	Banqiao	Football, Athletics	some local teams matches	
=	Taiwan Provincial Stadium	30,000	Taichung	Football, Athletics	some local teams matches	
=	Taoyuan City Stadium	30,000	Taoyuan District, Taoyuan City	Football, Athletics	some local teams matches	
=	Yunlin County Stadium	30,000	Dounan	Football, Athletics	some local teams matches	
9	Primary Stadium	25,000	Tainan	Baseball	CPBL - Uni-Lions	
10	Chengcing Lake Baseball Stadium	20,000	Niaosong, Kaohsiung	Baseball	Some CPBL matches	
=	Taichung Intercontinental Baseball Stadium	20,000	Taichung	Baseball	CPBL - CTBC Brothers	
=	Taipei Municipal Stadium	20,000	Taipei	Football, Athletics	Taipei Bravo PlayOne, Tatung F.C., Chinese Taipei national football team	
=	Rakuten Taoyuan Baseball Stadium	20,000	Taoyuan	Baseball	CPBL - Rakuten Monkeys	
14	Fengshan Stadium	18,000	Fongshan	Football, Athletics	Taiwan Power Company F.C.	
15	Taipei Arena	15,082	Taipei	Ice Hockey	Chinese Taipei Ice Hockey League	
16	Douliu Baseball Stadium	15,000	Douliu	Baseball	some local teams matches	
=	Kaohsiung Arena	15,000	Kaohsiung	Various indoor sports	TPBL - Kaohsiung Aquas	
=	Taoyuan Arena	15,000	Taoyuan	Basketball, Volleyball	PLG - Taoyuan Pilots; TPBL - Taoyuan Taiwan Beer Leopards	
=	Hsinchu Baseball Stadium	15,000	Hsinchu	Baseball	CPBL - Wei Chuan Dragons	
=	Hualien Stadium	12,000	Hualien	Football, Athletics	some local teams matches	
21	Xinzhuang Baseball Stadium	12,500	Xinzhuang	Baseball	CPBL - Fubon Guardians	
22	Tainan Municipal Baseball Stadium	11,000	Tainan	Baseball	CPBL - Uni-President Lions	
23	Taichung Baseball Field	10,500	Taichung	Baseball	some local teams matches	
=	Tianmu Baseball Stadium	10,500	Taipei	Baseball	some local teams matches	
25	Chiayi Baseball Field	10,000	Chiayi	Baseball	some local teams matches	
=	Pingtung Baseball Field	10,000	Pingtung	Baseball, Cricket	some local teams matches	
=	Yunlin Indoor Arena	10,000	Douliou	Basketball, Volleyball, Badminton	some local teams matches	

== See also ==
- List of sporting events in Taiwan
- Sport in Taiwan
- List of Asian stadiums by capacity
