= Hisanobu Watanabe =

Japanese baseball player and manager (born 1965)

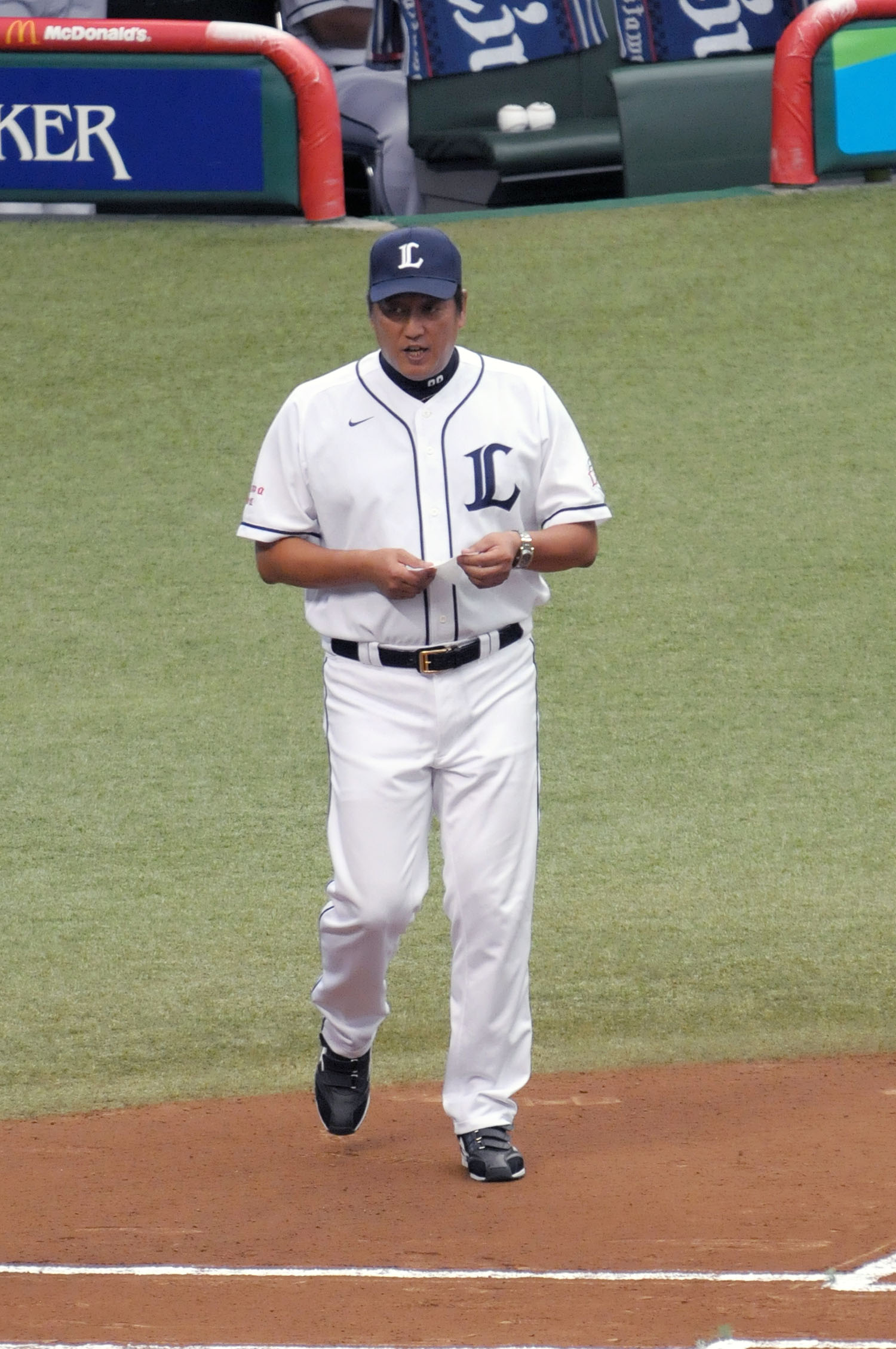
- Watanbe in 2012
- Pitcher / Manager
- Born: August 2, 1965 (age 60); Seta, Gunma, Japan
- Batted: Right Threw: Right

NPB debut
- June 29, 1984, for the Seibu Lions

Last NPB appearance
- October 8, 1998, for the Yakult Swallows

NPB statistics
- Win-loss record: 125–110
- Earned run average: 3.67
- Strikeouts: 1,609
- Stats at Baseball Reference

Teams
- As player: Seibu Lions (1984–1997); Yakult Swallows (1998); As coach: Chiayi-Tainan Luka (1999–2001); Seibu Lions (2004–2007); As manager: Saitama Seibu Lions (2008–2013, 2024)

Hisanobu Watanabe (渡辺 久信 born August 2, 1965) nicknamed "Nabe-Q", is a Japanese former professional baseball pitcher. He played in Nippon Professional Baseball (NPB) for the Seibu Lions and Yakult Swallows, and in the Taiwan Major League (TML) for the Chiayi-Tainan Luka.

== Coaching career ==
On October 5, 2024, after the Saitama Seibu Lions lost a club record 91 games during this season, Watanabe announced that he would be leaving the organization entirely.

== Career statistics ==
- **Bolded figures** are league-leading.

Year	Team	G	CG	SHO	W	L	SV	IP	H	HR	BB +HBP	SO	ER	ERA (Place)
1984	Seibu Lions	15	2	0	1	1	0	52.2	41	7	31	38	23	3.93
1985	Seibu Lions	43	7	0	8	8	11	152.0	132	22	75	121	54	3.20 (2)
1986	Seibu Lions	39	13	1	**16**	6	1	**219.1**	191	22	**82**	**178**	70	2.87 (2)
1987	Seibu Lions	30	5	1	5	3	8	105.2	81	10	46	74	36	3.07
1988	Seibu Lions	28	14	3	**15**	7	0	185	163	29	62	123	74	3.60 (14)
1989	Seibu Lions	29	17	4	15	11	0	226.2	**210**	**34**	90	174	86	3.41 (5)
1990	Seibu Lions	30	16	2	**18**	10	0	224.1	**206**	31	86	172	74	2.97 (2)
1991	Seibu Lions	25	6	1	7	10	0	151.1	142	17	73	127	74	4.40 (18)
1992	Seibu Lions	28	8	2	12	12	0	179.1	164	17	88	141	76	3.81 (15)
1993	Seibu Lions	26	7	1	9	14	0	160.0	153	15	73	143	68	3.83 (17)
1994	Seibu Lions	25	4	0	9	8	0	146.1	149	16	75	97	71	4.37 (14)
1995	Seibu Lions	20	0	0	3	4	6	49.1	42	7	30	43	31	5.66
1996	Seibu Lions	20	5	2	6	9	0	118.1	116	19	53	92	60	4.56
1997	Seibu Lions	12	0	0	0	2	0	43.1	42	4	27	37	20	4.15
1998	Yakult Swallows	19	1	0	1	5	1	61.2	56	9	38	49	29	4.23
1999	Chiayi-Tainan Luka	28	8	2	18	7	0	207.2	195	-	50	201	54	2.34
2000	Chiayi-Tainan Luka	27	7	1	15	8	0	203.2	194	-	42	169	56	2.47
2001	Chiayi-Tainan Luka	23	3	0	2	7	4	86.1	81	-	8	80	35	3.65
NPB Total(15 years)		389	105	17	125	110	27	2075.2	1888	259	932	1609	846	3.67
TML Total(3 years)		78	18	3	35	22	4	497.2	470	-	100	450	145	2.62

=== Titles and Awards(NPB) ===
- Wins Champion : 3 times (1986,1988,1990)
- Winning Percentage Champion : Once (1986)
- Strikeouts Champion : Once (1986)
- Best Nine : Once (1986)
- Golden Glove : Once (1990)
- All Star game appearance : 6 times (1985–1986,1988–1990,1992)
- No-hitter : Once (June 11, 1996)
