= China Times Eagles =

Defunct professional baseball team in Taiwan

Information
- League: Chinese Professional Baseball League
- Location: Pingtung
- Ballpark: Pingtung Baseball Field / Kaohsiung Li De Baseball Stadium
- Founded: 1993
- Folded: 1997
- League championships: 1997 1st Half
- Colors: Black

Current uniforms
Home	Away

The China Times Eagles (Chinese: 時報鷹) were a professional baseball team belonging to the Chinese Professional Baseball League (CPBL) that existed between 1993 and 1997.

== History ==
Originally formed as an amateur club Black Eagles in 1990, this club was purchased by the China Times Corporation in November 1991 and professionalized in 1992 after absorbing a group of players from the Chinese Taipei national baseball team who just won silver medal in the 1992 Summer Olympics, like its sister team Jungo Bears. This club took Kaohsiung Li De Baseball Stadium (Chengching Lake Baseball Field was not built at that time) and Pingtung Baseball Field as its home throughout its history.

== Regular season records ==
Season	First Half-Season					Second Half-Season				
Season	Wins	Losses	Ties	Pct.	Place	Wins	Losses	Ties	Pct.	Place
1993	18	26	1	.409	5	18	26	1	.409	5
1994	22	23	0	.489	4	24	20	1	.545	3
1995	26	24	0	.520	2	23	26	1	.469	3
1996	28	20	2	.583	3	28	21	1	.571	2
1997	30	16	2	.652	1	11	35	2	.239	7

== Playoff records ==
=== Taiwan Series ===
Season	Preliminary Round			Championship Round		
Season	Opponent	Wins	Losses	Opponent	Wins	Losses
1997	-	-	-	Wei Chuan Dragons	2	4

== Notable former players ==
- Robinson Checo
- Liao Ming-Hsiung
- Ravelo Manzanillo
- Pascual Pérez

== See also ==
- The Black Eagles Incident
