= Chiayi City Municipal Baseball Stadium =

Stadium in Chiayi City, Taiwan

Coordinates: 23.481076°N 120.465721°E

Chiayi Municipal Baseball Stadium 嘉義市立棒球場
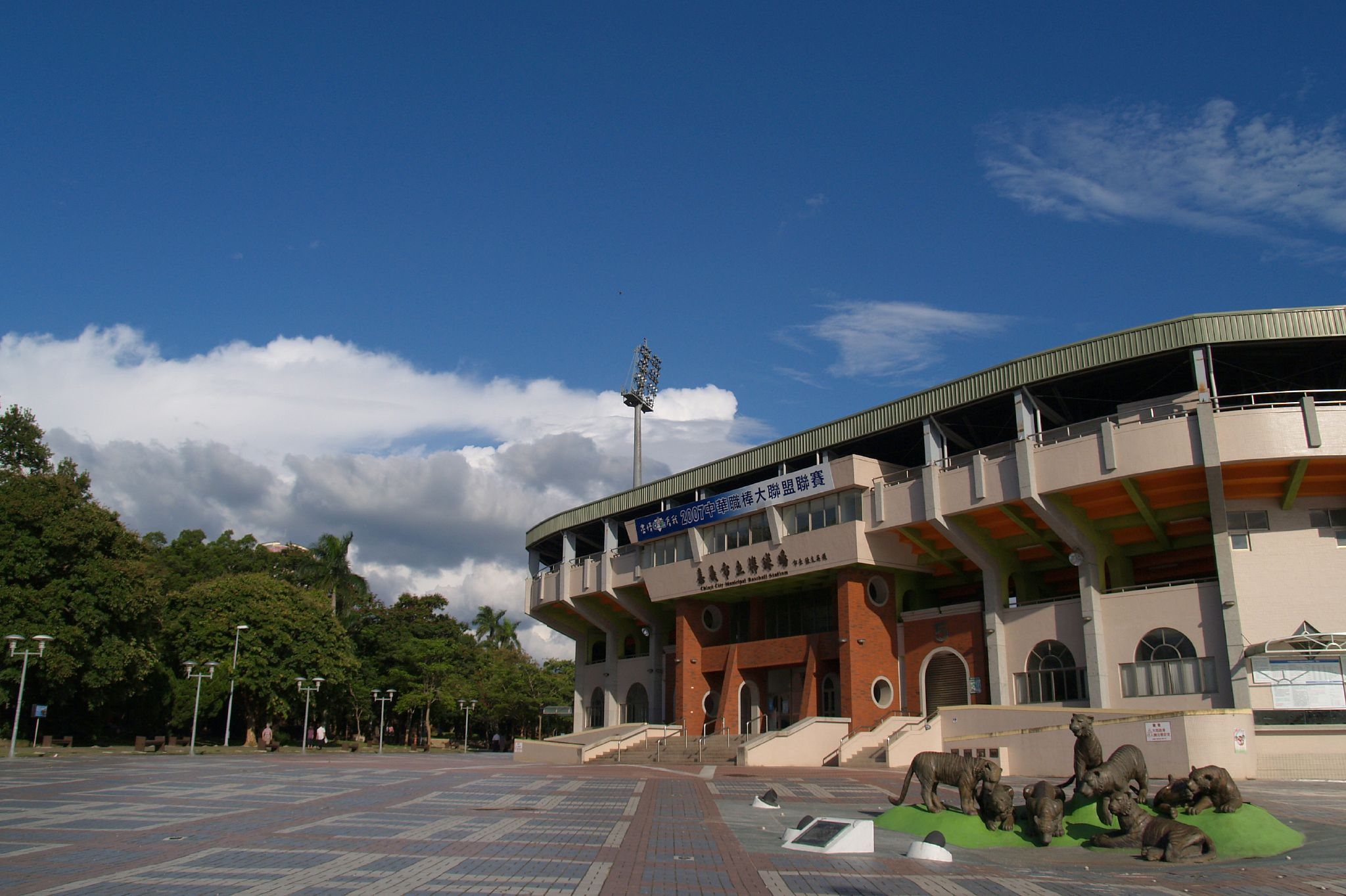
- Interactive map of Chiayi Municipal Baseball Stadium 嘉義市立棒球場
- Location: Chiayi City, Taiwan
- Capacity: 10,000
- Surface: Grass and Clay
- Field size: Left Field - 350 ft Center Field - 400 ft Right Field - 350 ft

Construction
- Groundbreaking: 1917
- Opened: December 1918
- Renovated: 18 September 1998

Tenant
- Chinatrust Whales (1998-2003)

Chiayi Municipal Baseball Stadium (Chinese: 嘉義市立棒球場; pinyin: Jiāyì Shìlì Bàngqiúchǎng) is a multi-use stadium in Chiayi City, Taiwan. It is currently used for baseball games and was the home field for the Chinatrust Whales from 1998 to 2003. The stadium was originally built in 1918 during the Taiwan under Japanese rule era and has been repeatedly refurbished. After the last refurbishment (1996) the stadium can host 9,000 spectators, and regularly hosts Chinese Professional Baseball League (CPBL) games.

== Trivia ==
This stadium is not the Chiayi County Baseball Stadium located in Taibao City, Chiayi County. The Chiayi County Baseball Stadium was built in 1996 and had been substantially invested and maintained by the Taiwan Major League as the home stadium of the Chiayi-Tainan Luka. On the contrary, Chiayi Baseball Field has been mainly for the use of CPBL. Chiayi County Baseball Stadium has a smaller capacity and is currently derelict after TML's collapse in 2003.

== See also ==
- List of stadiums in Taiwan
- Sport in Taiwan
