= Taichung Municipal Stadium =

Stadium in North, Taichung, Taiwan

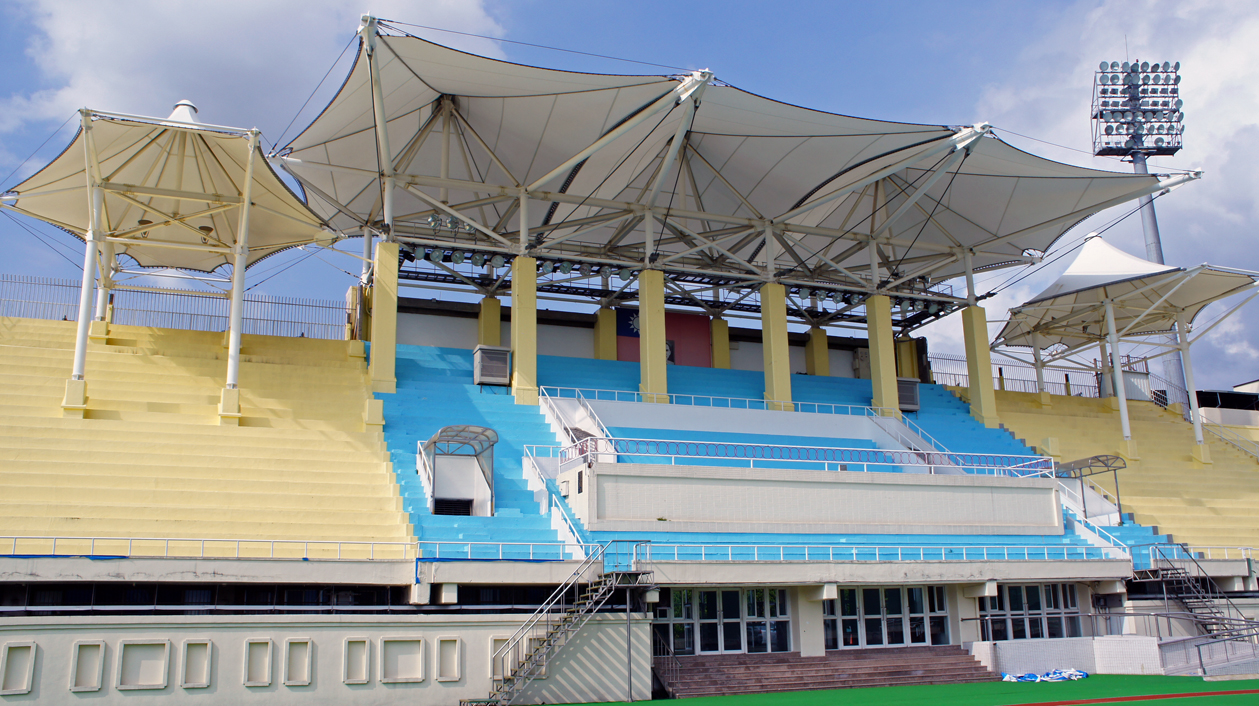
- Interactive map of Taichung Municipal Stadium
- Location: North, Taichung, Taiwan
- Coordinates: 24°09′05.5″N 120°41′22.5″E

Taiwan Provincial Stadium (now Taichung Municipal Stadium) is a multi-use stadium in North District, Taichung, Taiwan. It is currently used mostly for football matches. The stadium is able to hold 30,000 people and was opened in 1950.

== See also ==
- List of stadiums in Taiwan
