= Taichung Agan =

The Taichung Agan (Chinese: 台中金剛; pinyin: Táizhōng Jīngāng) was a Taiwanese professional baseball team belonging to the Taiwan Major League (TML). It was based in Taichung and took the Taichung Baseball Field (and occasionally the Hsinchu CKS Baseball Stadium) as its home throughout its history. After TML's collapse in early 2003 the Agan was absorbed by the Chinese Professional Baseball League's Macoto Cobras. Its most notable sponsor was the Acer Corporation, which sponsored this team in its last 2002 season.

The team's mascot, Agan, was derived from the Taiwanese aboriginal language of Tsou.

== Team history ==
The Agan finished last in the league's debut season of 1997, going 41–53. Mitch Lyden (.350, 27 HR, 72 RBI) was second in the league in average and possibly second in homers as the offensive star. The pitching was led by Al Osuna (8-6, 2.50), who had the best ERA in the league.

The Agan remained last with a 40–66 season in 1998. Lyden's production dropped drastically (.278, 6 HR) and Hsu Ming-Chieh (7-4, 2.52) was the top hurler, finishing third in the league in ERA. The Agan improved drastically in 1999, going 40-42-2 to finish second in the TML, then they beat the Taipei Gida 4 games to 2 in the championship. Hsu (15-6, 2.83) was third in ERA during the regular season and then was the MVP of the championship series. Brad Strauss came over from the Kaohsiung-Pingtung Fala during the season and won the batting title at .387.

Agan wore out though, and fell back to last in 2000 (35-46-3). Koji Muto (6-6, 2.74) was the top starter while Tung Tsung-hui (.330) was fourth in the TML in average. Taichung pulled a worst-to-first with a dazzling 43-16-1 record in 2001 and they beat Taipei Gida 4 games to 2 in the finals. Tung (.331) was again third in average, while Huang Chin-chih (7-3, 1.62) led the league in ERA and Hsu Chu-chien (7-2, 2.64) was fifth. Richard Bell (2-2, 22 Sv, 1.62, 69 K, 34 H in 55 IP) was the league's top reliever.

As the TML merged with the Chinese Professional Baseball League after 2002, it was Agan's last season and they again steamrolled the competition with a 47-24-1 record and toppling the Kaohsiung-Pingtung Fala 4 to 1 in the best-of-7 finals. Huang Chin-chih(16-2, 2 Sv, 1.46) led the league in wins and ERA and Muto (8-3, 2.26) was second in ERA. Ned Darley (2-0, 14 Sv, 1.13) again gave the team an effective foreign closer. Roberto Mejía led the league in hitting (.332), stole 20 bases and was second in homers (14) and RBI (62). The only better slugger was Chia-Hsian Hsieh, who homered 19 times, drove in 64 and was second with a .321 average.

With three titles, the Agan were the most successful team in TML history, though they finished last in their other three seasons.
