= Pingtung Baseball Field =

Stadium in Pingtung City, Pingtung County, Taiwan

- 屏東縣立棒球場
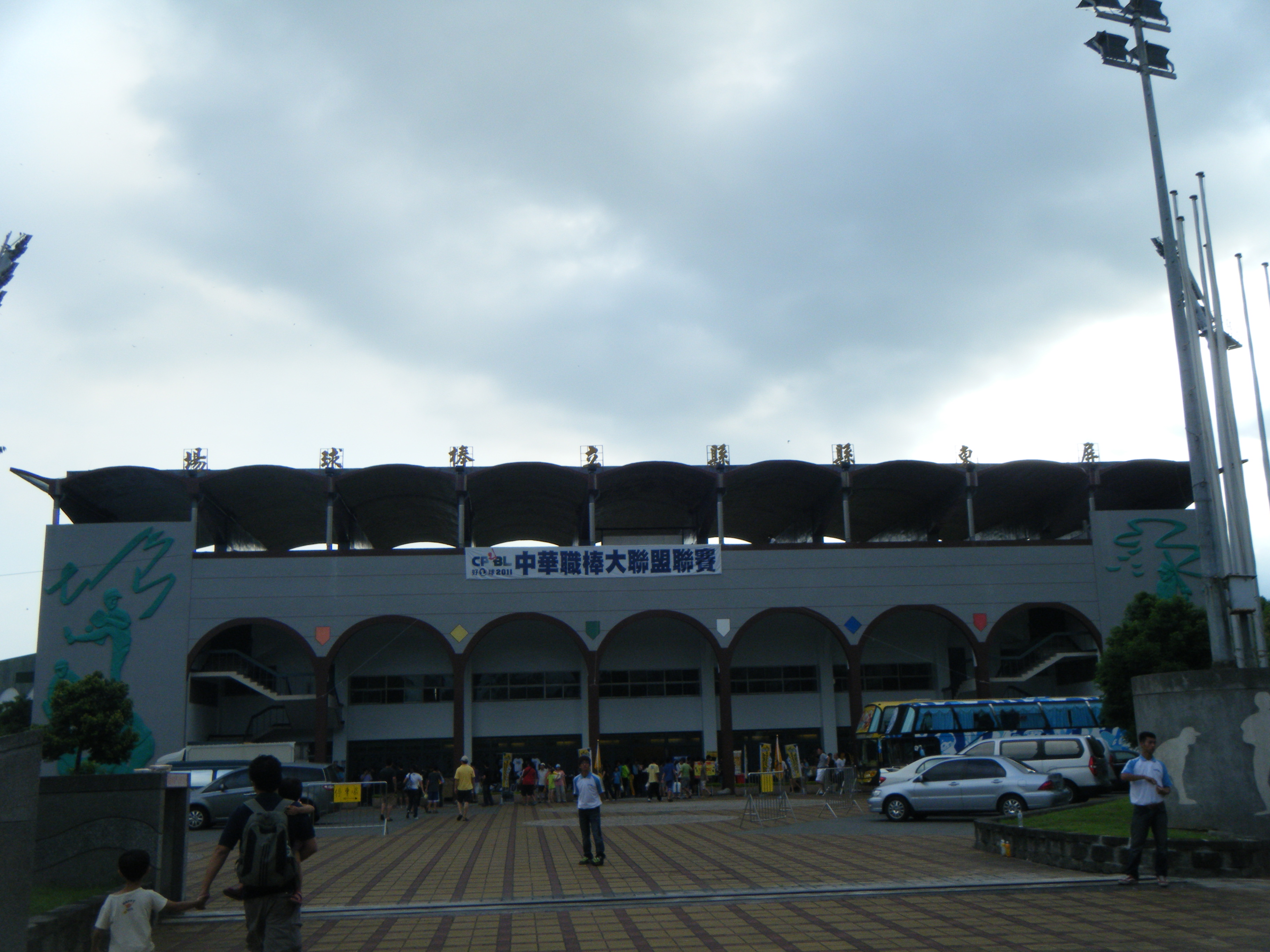
- Interactive map of Pingtung Baseball Field
- Location: Pingtung City, Pingtung County, Taiwan
- Coordinates: 22°39′24.8″N 120°29′07.3″E
- Capacity: 10,000 (1986)
- Type: Baseball stadium
- Surface: Dirt
- Field size: Left field - 320 ft Center field - 400 ft Right field - 320 ft

Construction
- Opened: 1981

Tenants
- China Times Eagles(1993–1997); Kaohsiung-Pingtung Fala(1997–2002)

Pingtung Baseball Field (Chinese: 屏東縣立棒球場; pinyin: Píngdōng Xiànlì Bàngqiúchǎng) is a multi-use stadium in Pingtung City, Pingtung County, Taiwan. Currently, it is mostly used for baseball; however, local cricket players have been using the field as a makeshift pitch for several years. It was opened in 1981 and can hold up to 10,000 people.

== See also ==
- List of stadiums in Taiwan
- Sport in Taiwan
