= Dmedia T-REX =

dmedia T-REX
- Logo

Information
- League: Chinese Professional Baseball League
- Location: Taipei
- Founded: 2003; 23 years ago
- Folded: 2008; 18 years ago
- Colors: Black and red

Current uniforms
Home	Away

The dmedia T-REX (米迪亞暴龍) was a professional baseball team belonging to the Chinese Professional Baseball League (CPBL).

== History ==
The history of the team can be traced back to early 2001, when local Macoto Bank started to sponsor Taiwan Major League's (TML) Taipei Gida, taking over from the original sponsor Sampo Corporation. After TML's merger with CPBL in early 2003, Macoto Bank decided to run one of the 2 absorbed TML teams and the new team Macoto Gida (誠泰太陽) was formed accordingly along with its sister team First Financial Holdings Agan. During the merger draft Macoto Bank picked the bulk of Macoto Gida's players from Taichung Agan and Chiayi-Tainan Luka, but not the original Taipei Gida. Macoto Bank went on running and changed the team's mascot to animal-style cobras following CPBL's regulations in early 2004.

In 2004 and 2005 the Macoto Cobras was head-coached by Tai-Yuan Kuo, a legendary Taiwanese pitcher who played for the Seibu Lions for 13 years. In 2005 this team competed with Sinon Bulls in the CPBL championships, but was defeated 0-4.

After the merger of Macoto Bank into Shin Kong Financial Holdings in January 2006, the Shin Kong Financial Holdings finally did not absorb the Cobras due to disagreement on purchase prices as well as its lacking willingness. So during the 2006 season it was Macoto Bank's original chairman Lin Cheng-i(林誠一) and his son, Macoto Bank's original CEO Lin Chih-kuang( 林致光) who used their own money to run this team. Unable to afford such burden, after the 2006 season ended the Lins have been trying to sell this team. The Foxconn Corporation was once reportedly interested, but finally in February 2007 it was the Taoyuan-based Jiuhe (九禾) Corporation which came to the takeover agreement with the Lins. However, on March 5, 2007 this takeover was disapproved by the CPBL General Managers committee. At the end of 2007 season, rumors about the team's sale again surfaced. It is announced on February 4, 2008, that dmedia System Co., Ltd. is the new owner of the team.

On October 8, 2008, T-REX CEO Shih Chien-shin was called to the local district attorney's office along with the team's general manager, spokesperson, and three other players for alleged game-fixing. On the following day, CPBL announced that it is freezing T-REX's membership pending investigation. On October 23, 2008, CPBL announced that Dmedia T-REX has been expelled from the league.

== Records ==
Qualified for playoffs	Taiwan Series Championship	Asia Series Championship

=== Regular seasons ===
Season	Wins	Losses	Ties	Pct.	Place
Macoto Gida
2003	30 (21/9)	64 (27/37)	6 (2/4)	.319 (.438'.196)	5 (5/6)
Macoto Cobras
2004	43 (26/17)	54 (24/30)	3 (0/3)	.443 (.520/.362)	5 (4/6)
2005	50 (29/21)	43 (20/23)	8 (2/6)	.538 (.592/.477)	2 (1/5)
2006	48 (24/24)	50 (24/26)	2 (2/0)	.490 (.500/.480)	4 (4/3)
2007	44 (28/16)	55 (21/34)	1 (1/0)	.444 (.571/.320)	5 (1/6)
dmedia T-REX
2008	37 (21/16)	60 (28/32)	1 (1/0)	.381 (.429/.333)	6 (4/6)
Total	252	326	21	.436	--

=== Playoffs ===
Season	First Round			Taiwan Series		
Season	Opponent	Wins	Losses	Opponent	Wins	Losses
Macoto Cobras
2005	Uni-President Lions	3	1	Sinon Bulls	0	4
2007	Uni-President Lions	0	3	Eliminated.		
Total	Combining the first round and Taiwan Series				3	8
