= Tianmu Baseball Stadium =

Baseball stadium in Shilin, Taipei, Taiwan

Taipei Tianmu Baseball Stadium
- 臺北市立天母棒球場
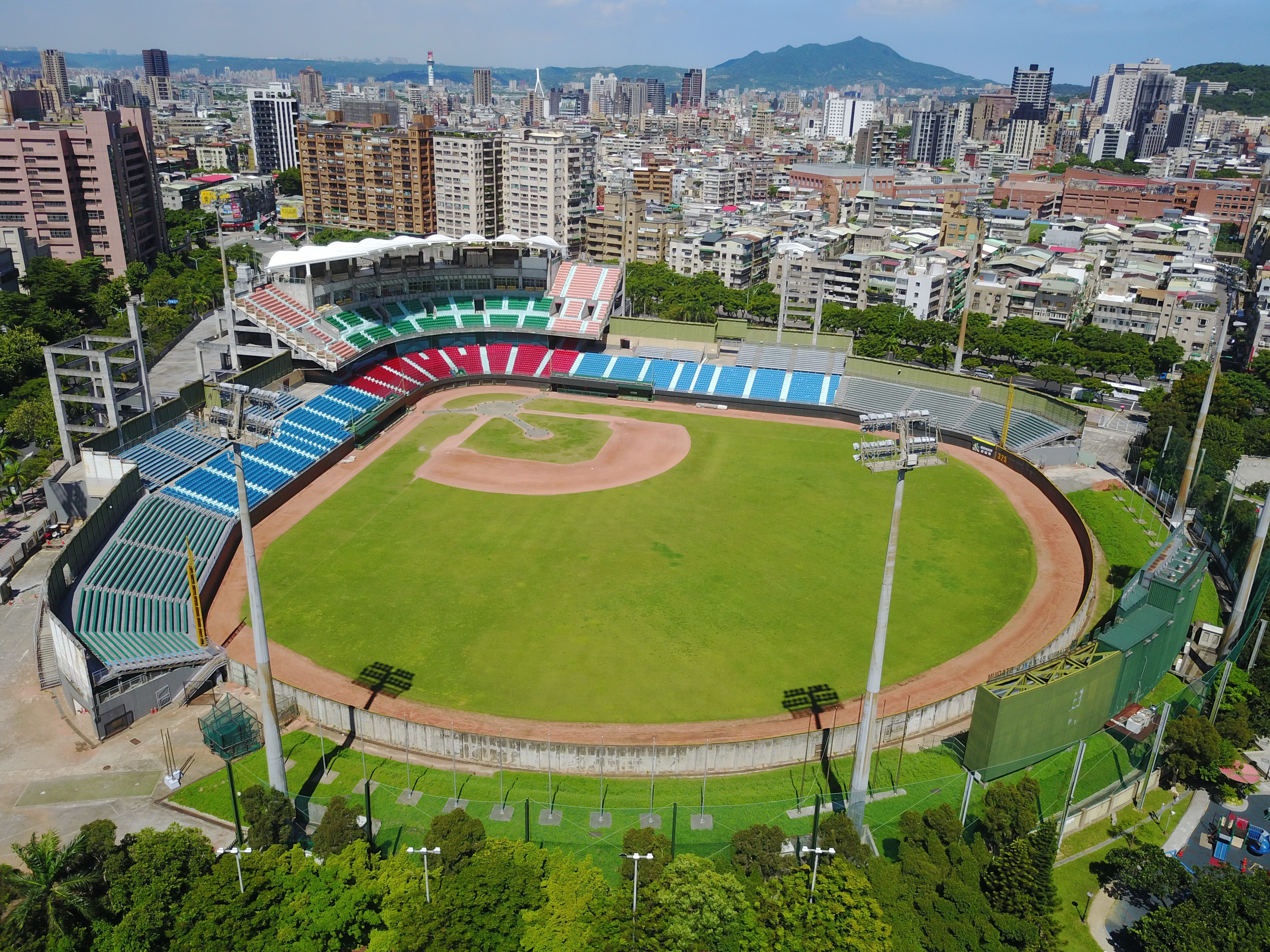
- Interactive map of Taipei Tianmu Baseball Stadium
- Location: Shilin, Taipei, Taiwan
- Coordinates: 25°06′47″N 121°31′59″E
- Owner: Taipei City Government
- Capacity: 10,000
- Surface: Artificial turf (since 2021)
- Scoreboard: Yes
- Field size: Left Field Line - 325 ft (99.06 m); Center Field - 400 ft (121.92m); Right Field Line - 325 ft (99.06 m)

Construction
- Groundbreaking: 25 March 1997
- Opened: 15 August 1999

Tenant
- Wei Chuan Dragons (2021–present)

The Taipei Tianmu Baseball Stadium (Chinese: 臺北市立天母棒球場; pinyin: Táiběi Shìlì Tiānmǔ Bàngqiú Chǎng) is a baseball stadium located in Tianmu Sport Park in Shilin District, Taipei, Taiwan. It was built in 1999, and mostly hosts baseball games. Originally designed as a community ballpark, Tianmu Stadium is located in a rather high price residential neighborhood of Tianmu, resulting in many sound and light restrictions in regard to the usage of the stadium.

== Transportation ==
The stadium is accessible within walking distance east from Mingde Station or Zhishan Station of Taipei Metro.

== See also ==
- List of stadiums in Taiwan
- Sport in Taiwan
