= Chinatrust Whales =

Taiwanese baseball team

- Logo

Information
- League: Chinese Professional Baseball League
- Location: Chiayi
- Ballpark: Chiayi City Municipal Baseball Stadium
- Founded: 1991; 35 years ago
- Folded: 2008; 18 years ago
- Former name: Koos Group Whales (1997–2001)
- Colors: Teal, red and white

Current uniforms
Home	Away

The Chinatrust Whales (中信鯨), formerly Koos Group Whales (和信鯨), were a Taiwanese professional baseball team. Founded as an amateur team in 1991, this club became professional and joined the Chinese Professional Baseball League (CPBL) in 1997. It was administered by the Chinatrust Financial Holding Company. The Whales never won a CPBL championship during its existence. On 11 November 2008, it was announced that the team would disband due to financial losses of the Chinatrust group.

== History ==
In 1997, the amateur Chinatrust Whales Baseball Team was professionalized and became the seventh member of Chinese Professional Baseball League; however, because Taiwan forbids financial institutions to invest in unrelated markets, the ownership of the team had to be transferred to Koos Group (和信集團), which was also the owner of Chinatrust, thus the team was named KG Whales when it began its first season.

Initially, the Whales played their home games at the Chiayi Baseball Field. The team did not have any notable success over the course of its history, with only two appearances in the Championship series, winning only a single game over the course of those two series while dropping eight. In 2002, because of the split of Chinatrust and the Koos Group, the ownership of the Whales were transferred back to Chinatrust and renamed Chinatrust Whales. The organization disbanded after the 2008 season.

Although owned by the same parent corporation, Chinatrust Whales and Chinatrust Brothers are two separate organization with separate franchise histories. Chinatrust acquired the Brothers organization from Brother Hotel in December 2013, five years after the Whales folded.

== Final roster ==
2008 Chinatrust Whales roster
Active roster		Coaches
Pitchers: 49 (Taiwan) Chu Wei-ming; 36 (Taiwan) Ni Fu-te; 46 (Taiwan) Kao Min-ching; 11 (Taiwan) Liu Yu-chan; 61 (Taiwan) Shen Yu-chieh; 21 (Taiwan) Tsai Chia-hung; 39 (Taiwan) Tseng Chao-hao; 25 (Taiwan) Tu Chang-wei; 43 (United States) Steve Watkins	Catchers: 30 (Taiwan) Li Yi-wei; 27 (Taiwan) Wang Chun-jen; 8 (Taiwan) Wang Hsin-min; Infielders: 3 (Taiwan) Chang Chia-yuan; 3 (Taiwan) Chen Chia-hung; 3 (Taiwan) Chiu Chun-wen; 2 (Taiwan) Lin Yung-kun; 9 (Taiwan) Tseng Chia-hsien; 18 (Dominican Republic) Wilton Veras; 27 (Taiwan) Wang Yi-min; Outfielders: 55 (Taiwan) Huang Cheng-chi; 7 (Taiwan) Kuo Tai-yung; 28 (Taiwan) Lin Chin-chang; 56 (Taiwan) Lu Chun-hsiung; 58 (Taiwan) Yang Chin-hsiung; 13 (Taiwan) Yeh Chang-lung	Manager: 83 (Taiwan) Hsieh Chang-heng; Coaches: 72 (Taiwan) Chiu Chi-pin (infielders); 88 (Taiwan) Huang Chiung-lung (outfielders); 77 (Taiwan) Hsieh Cheng-hsun (pitching); 81 (Taiwan) Li Kun-che (hitting); 66 (Taiwan) Li Tu-hung (pitching); Source: CPBL and Chinatrust Whales

== Records ==
Qualified for Playoffs	Taiwan Series Championship	Asia Series Championship

=== Regular seasons ===
Season	Wins	Losses	Ties	Pct.	Place
Koos Group Whales
1997	39 (20/19)	56 (27/29)	1 (1/0)	.411 (.426/.396)	7 (6/6)
1998	54	49	2	.524	4
1999	60	29	2	.674	1
2000	41 (21/20)	45 (21/24)	4 (3/1)	.477 (.500/.455)	3 (2/3)
2001	45 (23/22)	45 (22/23)	0 (0/0)	.500 (.511/.489)	3 (2/2)
Chinatrust Whales
2002	45 (21/24)	42 (21/21)	3 (3/0)	.517 (.500/.533)	2 (2/2)
2003	51 (26/25)	43 (19/24)	6 (5/1)	.543 (.578/.510)	4 (2/4)
2004	45 (21/24)	50 (27/23)	5 (2/3)	.474 (.438/.511)	4 (5/4)
2005	47 (24/23)	49 (24/25)	4 (2/2)	.490 (.500/.479)	4 (4/4)
2006	42 (17/25)	51 (31/20)	7 (2/5)	.452 (.354/.556)	5 (6/2)
2007	46 (19/27)	52 (30/22)	2 (1/1)	.469 (.388/.551)	4 (6/3)
2008	39 (20/19)	61 (30/31)	0 (0/0)	.390 (.400/.380)	5 (5/4)
Totals	554	572	36	.492	--

=== Playoffs ===
Season	First Round			Taiwan Series		
Season	Opponent	Wins	Losses	Opponent	Wins	Losses
Koos Group Whales
1999	No first round.			Wei Chuan Dragons	1	4
Chinatrust Whales
2002	No first round.			Brother Elephants	0	4
Total	Combining the first round and Taiwan Series				1	8
