= Taipei Gida =

Taiwanese professional baseball team

Taipei Gida (Chinese: 台北太陽; pinyin: Táiběi Tàiyáng; literally "Taipei Sun") was a Taiwanese professional baseball team that existed from 1997 to 2002. It was one of the four Taiwan Major League (TML) teams and was based in Taipei, Taiwan. Its historical sponsors included local Sampo Corporation and Macoto Bank, so for sponsorship purposes, the team was called Sampo Gida (聲寶太陽) or Macoto Gida (誠泰太陽).

The team's history could be traced back to 1991 when Sampo Corporation's then chairman Chen Sheng-tian (陳盛沺) began sponsoring the Chinese Culture University baseball team. After the players graduated, Chen formed the amateur baseball team Sampo Giants to host them and tried to enter the Chinese Professional Baseball League (CPBL) starting 1992. Chen's applications were repeatedly rejected, so he decided to cooperate with TVBS chairman Chiu Fu-sheng to form TML and turned Sampo Giants into Taipei Gida. However, by the end of 2000, Chen ceased to support the team after long-time financial losses. Macoto Bank took it over later.

The team's historical performance was not bad, winning the championship twice during TML's 6-season history. This team is also the only TML team that never annually ranked last in the league. After TML's merger with the CPBL in early 2003, the team was absorbed by First Financial Holdings Agan and later La New Bears.

== Regular season records ==
Year	Win	Loss	Tie	Rank	Win–loss %
1997	53	43	0	2	.552
1998	53	53	2	3	.500
1999	48	33	3	1	.593
2000	52	30	2	1	.634
2001	31	27	2	2	.534
2002	31	39	2	3	.443
Total	268	225	11		.544

- TML Championships: twice, 1998 and 2000

== Notable former players ==
- Sam Horn
- Takehiro Ishii
- Lenin Picota
- Keith Dishart
