= Chengcing Lake Baseball Stadium =

Baseball stadium in Niaosong, Kaohsiung, Taiwan

- 澄清湖棒球場
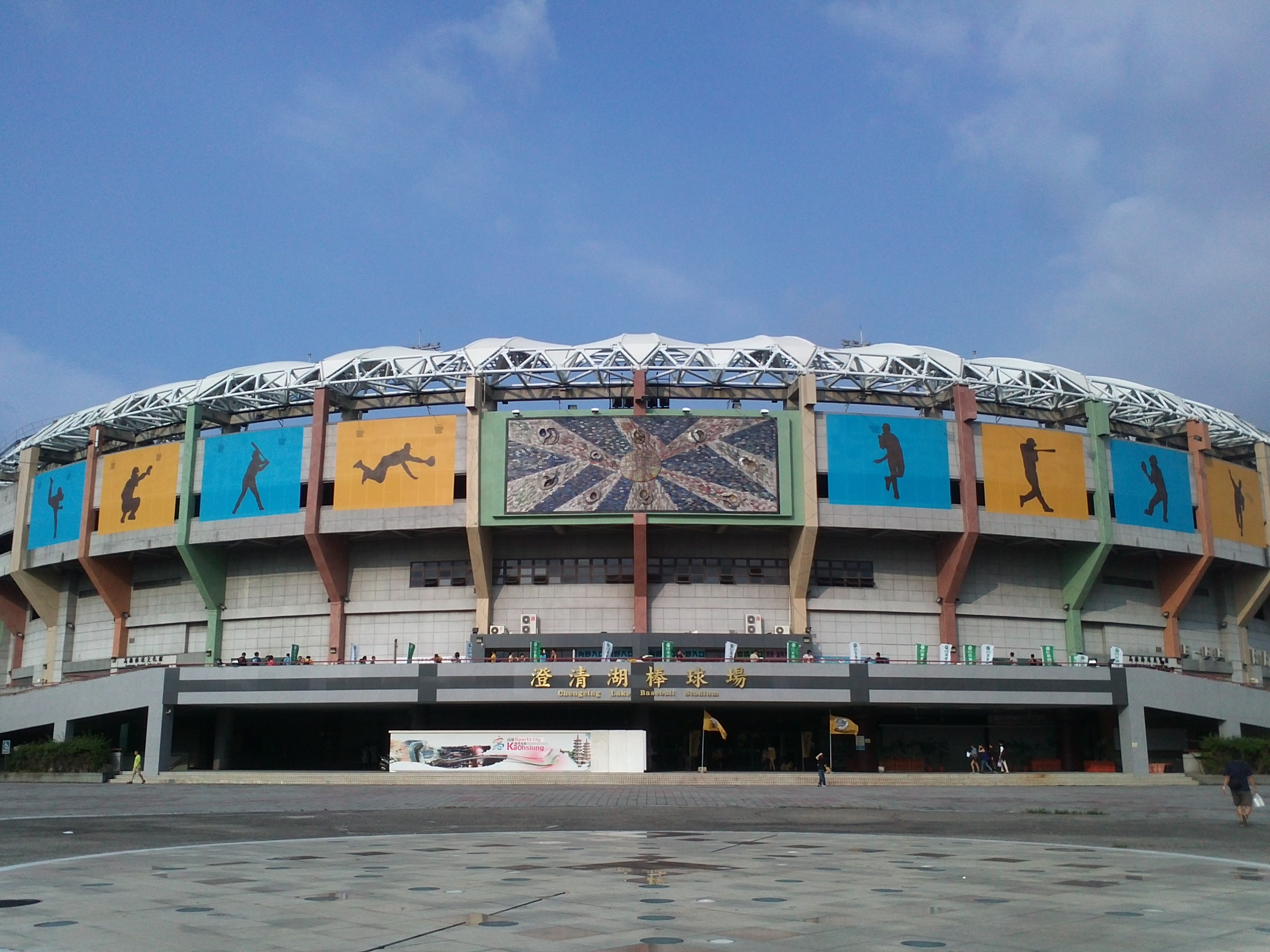
- Interactive map of Chengcing Lake Baseball Stadium
- Location: Niaosong, Kaohsiung, Taiwan
- Coordinates: 22°39′16.1″N 120°21′32.3″E
- Capacity: 19,907 (1999)
- Surface: grass
- Scoreboard: Yes
- Field size: Left Field - 328 ft (100 m); Center Field — 400 ft (121 m); Right Field — 328 ft (100 m)

Construction
- Groundbreaking: July 1996
- Opened: May 1999

Tenants
- Kaohsiung-Pingtung Fala (1999–2002); First Financial Holdings Agan (2003); La New Bears (2004-2010); EDA Rhinos (2013-2016); TSG Hawks (2022-)

The Chengcing Lake Baseball Stadium (traditional Chinese: 澄清湖棒球場; simplified Chinese: 澄清湖棒球场; pinyin: Chéngqīng Hú Bàngqiú Chǎng) is a baseball stadium located in Niaosong District, Kaohsiung, Taiwan, on the side of Chengcing Lake. The stadium opened in 1999 and has been the home of Kaohsiung-Pingtung Fala (1999–2002), First Financial Holdings Agan (2003), La New Bears (2004-2010), and EDA Rhinos (2013–2016). The stadium is currently the home of TSG Hawks.

== See also ==
- List of stadiums in Taiwan
- Sport in Taiwan
