= Taiwan Major League =

Professional baseball league

- Sport: Baseball
- Founded: 1996
- Folded: 2003
- Country: Taiwan
- Last champion: Taichung Agan (3rd title)
- Most titles: Taichung Agan (3 titles)
- Broadcasters: Era Television, ESPN

The Taiwan Major League Professional Baseball (TML; Chinese: 臺灣大聯盟; pinyin: Táiwān Dà Liánméng) was a professional baseball league in Taiwan that operated from 1996 to 2003. It was established by TV tycoon Chiu Fu-sheng after a row over the Chinese Professional Baseball League (CPBL) broadcasting rights. The CPBL absorbed the TML in 2003.

== History ==
Throughout the TML's history, all four teams were directly owned and managed by the Naluwan Corporation, a subsidiary of the TVBS media group, both of which were then chaired by Chiu Fu-sheng. TVBS held the broadcasting rights for CPBL games from 1993 to 1996 during the CPBL's heyday, but lost them in August 1995 to Videoland Television Network, a subsidiary of the Koos Group, whose baseball team the Koos Group Whales later joined the CPBL in 1997. Chiu therefore established TML in December 1995 in anticipation to maintain advertisement revenue. The TML's other keyman was local Sampo Corporation(聲寶企業)'s then chairman Chen Sheng-tian(陳盛沺); his amateur baseball team the Sampo Giants had been requesting to join the CPBL since 1992, but was repeatedly rejected by the CPBL for unexplained reasons. Chen later decided to join forces with Chiu and turned the Sampo Giants into Taipei Gida, and sponsored this team until the end of 2000, when he realized there was no possibility for the TML to make a profit. TML's first historical game was played by the visiting Taipei Gida and Chiayi-Tainan Luka at Chiayi County Baseball Stadium on February 28, 1997.

Throughout the TML's history, the TML, often with considerable incentives, had been attracting active CPBL players to break their CPBL contracts and join the TML. Nearly 30 CPBL players, both Taiwanese and foreign, broke from the CPBL and joined the TML. The TML also had a much looser policy on international players, such as allowing a team to register eleven international players in the 1997 season and seven in the 1998 season.

Chiu annually leased the teams' logos and naming rights to different sponsors for advertising purposes, so every year each team would bear a different name from different sponsors, while the home city and mascot remained the same. Also, players were sometimes shuffled after a season to "balance each teams' strength"; all TML players' were directly signed by the Naluwan Corporation and not the team they played for. These circumstances prevented the TML from gaining popularity comparable to the CPBL, and the TML also had difficulty in opening new markets in the aftermath of the Black Eagles Incident.

In January 2003, Chiu finally agreed to a government-brokered merger with CPBL, and reorganized his four teams to two. Chiu also resigned from his chairperson position in TVBS. President Chen Shui-bian, who acted as the middle person in the merger agreement, asked First Financial Holdings to purchase one of the teams, while Macoto Bank voluntarily took over the other.

Before the CPBL's 2003 season started, the CPBL decided to fine each former "traitor", or those who broke their contracts with the CPBL, who returned with the former TML teams because of their previous contract-breaking. Both Macoto Bank and First Financial Holdings originally refused to pay the fine, and the players were banned from playing in the 2003 season. In 2004, Macoto Bank and La New Corporation, who purchased the team from First Financial Holdings, gave in to CPBL demands and paid the fine by adding extra restrictions in these players' contracts. The ban was subsequently lifted.

== Mascots ==
The mascots Agan, Fala, Gida and Luka originated from Taiwanese aboriginal symbols and were stipulated by the league. This is contrary to the standard practice of the CPBL, whose member organization all chose animals as their mascots. When the merger took place, the two former TML teams changed their mascots to meet the standard CPBL practice.

== Teams ==
TML Club	Chinese name	Stadium	Absorbed CPBL Team
Chianan Luka	嘉南勇士	Chiayi County Baseball Stadium	Macoto Gida in 2003
Kaoping Fala	高屏雷公	Chengcing Lake Baseball Stadium	First Financial Holdings Agan in 2003
Taichung Agan	台中金剛	Taichung Baseball Field - Primary Home; Hsinchu CKS Baseball Stadium - occasional games	Macoto Gida in 2003
Taipei Gida	台北太陽	Xinzhuang Baseball Stadium (Primary home 2000–2002); Taipei Municipal Baseball Stadium (1997-1999); Hsinchu CKS Baseball Stadium (occasional games); Tianmu Baseball Stadium (Alternate daytime/weekends 2000–2002)	First Financial Holdings Agan in 2003

== Games ==
Other than the member teams' home cities, games were also held in minor cities, although at a less frequently. The TML also suggested a Taiwan championship series between the TML and the CPBL, but was rebuffed.

== Champions ==
- 1997: Chiayi-Tainan Luka defeated Taipei Gida, 4–3
- 1998: Taipei Gida defeated Kaohsiung-Pingtung Fala, 4–3
- 1999: Taichung Agan defeated Taipei Gida, 4–2
- 2000: Taipei Gida defeated Kaohsiung-Pingtung Fala, 4–0
- 2001: Taichung Agan defeated Taipei Gida, 4–2
- 2002: Taichung Agan defeated Kaohsiung-Pingtung Fala, 4–1

== See also ==
- Chinese Professional Baseball League
- Professional baseball in Taiwan
