= Chinese Professional Baseball League =

Top-tier professional baseball league in Taiwan

Chinese Professional Baseball League (CPBL)
- Current season, competition or edition: 2026 CPBL season
- Sport: Baseball
- Founded: 1989; 37 years ago
- Commissioner: Tsai Chi-chang
- No. of teams: 6
- Country: Taiwan
- Continent: Asia
- Most recent champion: Wei Chuan Dragons (6th title) (2026)
- Most titles: CTBC Brothers; Uni-President 7-Eleven Lions; (both 10 titles)
- Qualification: Asia Series (2005–2013)
- Broadcasters: CPBL TV (via Hami Video); ELTA Sports; Videoland Television Network; DAZN; MOMOTV
- Level on pyramid: 1
- Website: cpbl.com.tw

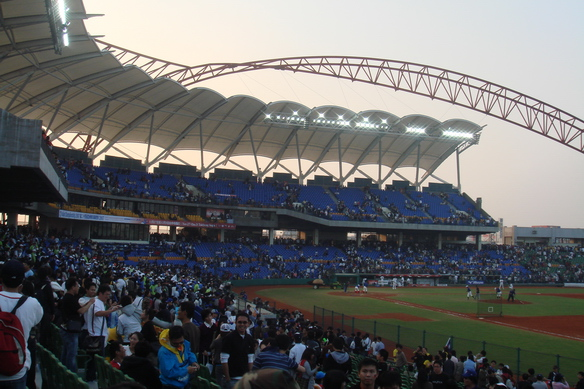
Taichung Intercontinental Stadium

The Chinese Professional Baseball League (CPBL; Chinese: 中華職業棒球大聯盟; pinyin: Zhōnghuá Zhíyè Bàngqiú Dàliánméng) is the top-tier professional baseball league in the Republic of China (Taiwan). The league was established in 1989 and played the first season in 1990. CPBL eventually absorbed the competing Taiwan Major League in 2003. As of the 2025 season, the CPBL consists of six organizations, all of which have teams in the main league and farm league. The CPBL consists of Major (一軍; 'first/primary corps') and, since 2006, Minor (二軍; 'second/reserve corps') leagues, with the Minor league team rosters consist of developmental and injury-recovering players.

In comparison to Minor League Baseball, when the CPBL only had four teams 10 years ago, it was considered to be at a High-A level, with a wider spread of talent and more offense than American leagues. The league has rapidly grown in recent years, expanding to six teams together with the success of Taiwanese baseball in international competitions. It is currently the fifth-wealthiest baseball league in the world, and the fourth-wealthiest if calculated per team (after MLB, NPB, and KBO). The CPBL is also the fourth-highest attended baseball league in the world, with an average attendance of over ten thousand per game.

CPBL TV is CPBL's official paid live-streaming and video-on-demand platform. It receives signals from each team's broadcasting partners and is available worldwide.

== History ==
Baseball was first introduced to Taiwan during Japanese rule, and gained popularity when the national little league baseball teams won numerous Little League World Series championships in the 1970s and 1980s. The national baseball team also performed exceptionally well in many international competitions. However, the development of baseball in Taiwan was limited due to the lack of a professional league, and therefore many players were reluctant to commit to the sport.

The idea of forming a professional baseball league in Taiwan was first suggested by local Brother Hotel's chairman Hung Teng-sheng (洪騰勝). He formed his amateur Brother Hotel baseball team in 1984, and intended to professionalize his team and form a professional league within a few years. Throughout 1988 and 1989, Hung visited numerous Taiwanese businesses, trying to convince them to form professional baseball clubs. Most of his requests were rejected, but the Wei Chuan Corporation, Mercuries Chain Stores, and Uni-President Corporation all supported the idea and formed teams. The Chinese Professional Baseball League was established on October 23, 1989, with Hung Teng-sheng acting as secretary-general. Because of his contribution to professional baseball in Taiwan, Hung is sometimes referred to as the "Father of the CPBL." Chung Meng-shun (鍾孟舜) designed every original logo of the four founding teams.

=== Expansions in the 1990s ===
With the popularity rise in the first few years, the Jungo Bears and China Times Eagles joined in 1993. The Koos Group Whales joined in 1997. The CPBL consisted of seven teams in the 1997 season, the most in the league's history.

However, at the same time, TVBS and Sampo Corporation (聲寶企業) founded another professional baseball league, Taiwan Major League. TVBS is ex-broadcaster of CPBL. Sampo Giants had been requesting to join the CPBL since 1992, but was repeatedly rejected by the CPBL for unexplained reasons.

Despite there were eleven teams playing professional baseball, the two leagues competed with each other.

=== Multi-impact, decline in popularity ===
Game-fixing scandals, the Black Tigers Incident in 1995, and the Black Eagles Incident in 1997, resulted in a major popularity decline. The China Times Eagles became defunct after the 1997 season.

In the 1999 season, due to the 921 earthquake, the CPBL regular season was not fully finished. After the 1999 season, the Wei Chuan Dragons and Mercuries Tigers also became defunct, prior to which the Dragons had made a dynasty with three consecutive championships.

In the 2000 season, the CPBL was reduced to four teams.

=== Merger with Taiwan Major League ===
After the 2002 season, before the CPBL's 2003 season started, the TML finally agreed to merge with the CPBL.

Four teams from TML reorganized to two and exchanged the team names. First Financial Holdings purchased one of the teams, while Macoto Bank voluntarily took over the other.

=== Game-fixing scandals ===
Although the clash of leagues was solved, the game-fixing scandals still haunted baseball in Taiwan: the Black Bears Incident in 2005, the Black Whales Incident in 2007, the Black Dmedia Scandal in 2008, and the Black Elephants Incident in 2009.

In October 2008, the Black Dmedia Scandal broke out. This was the first time gangsters directly controlled a baseball team for game-fixing. Eventually, Dmedia T-REX were expelled from the league.

After the 2008 season, the Chinatrust Whales became defunct and the league was reduced to four teams once again.

After the 2009 season, the next day of Uni-President 7-Eleven Lions made a dynasty (championships from 2007 to 2009), the Black Elephants Incident broke out. Brother Elephants was affected deeply by a match fixing scandal involving relief pitcher Wu Pao-hsien which resulted in expulsion of many team players and the coach.

=== Big Companies take over ===
At the end of the 2012 season, Sinon Corporation announced its intention to sell the team. By late December, an agreement was reached between Sinon Corporation and E-United Group, and the team was renamed EDA Rhinos after E-DA World, a large shopping, entertainment and hotel complex in Kaohsiung operated by E-United Group.

The EDA Rhinos intends to play games at both Li De Baseball Stadium in downtown Kaohsiung and Chengcing Lake Baseball Field in the suburb during the upcoming 2013 CPBL season. The Rhinos also signaled in signing Manny Ramirez for 2013 as its billboard player. Taiwanese former MLB player Chin-lung Hu also signed with the team following the 2013 CPBL Draft.

In October 2013, Brother Hotel announced attempts to sell the baseball team. The announcement drew interest from seven potential bidders. Brother Elephants was sold to Hua Yi, a subdivision of CTBC Holding, by December 2013 for a price of NT$400 million. The team's name changed into CTBC Brothers, reflected their new corporate parent, but it was felt that the branding from their previous owners was strong enough to rename the team Brothers, while retaining the elephant mascot.

In June 2016, it was announced that the E-United Group are willing to sell the team. EDA Rhinos won the second stage of the 2016 CPBL season and qualified to the Taiwan Series, where they defeated CTBC Brothers 4–2 to win their first championship since 2005. In November 2016, the team was renamed as Fubon Guardians after Fubon Financial Holding Co. bought the team.

=== Recent expansions ===
In May 2019, Commissioner John Wu announced that CPBL had reached agreement with Ting Hsin International Group to join the league by reactivating a former team, the Wei Chuan Dragons. The Dragons participated in the minor league in 2020, and returned to the major league in 2021.

After Tsai Chi-chang became commissioner in 2021, he proposed that Kaohsiung serve as the location for a new team since it was the only major city in Taiwan without a CPBL team at the time. In February 2022, Tsai announced that the sixth team would be formed by either Chunghwa Telecom or Taiwan Steel Group; it was later announced that the expansion team would be owned by Taiwan Steel Group, and that the team would be named TSG Hawks, with their home field at Chengcing Lake Stadium in Kaohsiung.

=== 2020 season and COVID-19 ===
Due to the COVID-19 pandemic, the opening day of the 31st CPBL season on March 14 was delayed. It was originally brought earlier compared to previous seasons to accommodate the final qualifying tournament of 2021 Tokyo Olympics.

On 1 April, the CPBL announced that the season would begin from 11 April as the Rakuten Monkeys hosted the CTBC Brothers with the games being playing without live fans. This received international coverage because other major baseball leagues such as the MLB in North America, the NPB in Japan, and the KBO in South Korea, which were still severely impacted by the virus outbreak were unable to confirm the dates of their respective season openings. The annual CPBL All-Star Game was cancelled for the first time to accommodate to the compact schedule.

==== After the 2020 season ====
In 2025, Sarah Edwards became the first female on-field coach in Asian professional baseball, as a hitting coach for the CTBC Brothers in the CPBL.

== Naming issue ==
The name "Chinese Professional Baseball League" has attracted debate among Taiwanese baseball fans. Many have called for the name of CPBL to be changed, with suggestions including the replacement of “Chinese” with “Taiwan”, “Formosa” or “Chunghwa”.

In the 2018 Taiwanese referendum, CPBL officials publicly rejected the proposal for Taiwan to compete as "Taiwan" instead of "Chinese Taipei" in the 2020 Summer Olympics, for fear that Taiwanese athletes may risk losing eligibility. The league received criticism for holding this stance while selling official merchandise that said "Team Taiwan."

In April 2020, Premier Su Tseng-chang said that in order to elevate Taiwan's visibility in the world, there was a need to distinguish Taiwan from China in the naming of China Airlines and CPBL. A New Power Party survey showed that 62% of Taiwanese people support changing the name of the league to distinguish itself from Chinese baseball and avoid confusion.

In January 2021, CPBL commissioner Tsai Chi-chang agreed that spectators should be made aware that the league was being played in Taiwan and not China, but that a name change was not a top priority.

== Organizations ==
All teams are owned by and named after large Taiwanese corporations, a similar practice seen in Japan's NPB and South Korea's KBO. Each team manages a regional market with a home city, but does not play its games exclusively in that market. Other than the home cities, regular season games are also held in Hsinchu, Douliu, Chiayi, Pingtung, Luodong, Hualien, and Taitung with less frequency.

Each season spans from March to October, with a one-week all-star break in June or July, which separates the season into first and second half-seasons. Playoffs are held in late October or early November, with three teams competing in two rounds. A team may qualify for playoffs either by winning a half-season title, or be awarded a wild card berth by attaining the highest place in the seasonal ranks. If a team wins a half-season title, it will not be considered in the seasonal ranks when the winner of the wild card is being decided. If both half seasons were won by the same team, another wild card berth will be given through the same mechanism after the first berth has been awarded

Between 2005 and 2013, the champion team represented Taiwan in the Asia Series to compete with other champion teams from Nippon Professional Baseball (Japan Series), KBO League (Korean Series), Australian Baseball League (Claxton Shield), and the WBSC Europe (European Champion Cup).

=== Foreign players ===
A typical salary for a foreign player as of 2025 starts at around $20,000 per month USD on a three month guaranteed contract and can reach as much as $600,000 for full season for the best foreign players. These positions are normally filled by players with Triple-A and limited MLB Major League Baseball and NPB Nippon Professional Baseball major league experience. The number of foreign players allowed on a team's roster is limited to four. Of the four players, only three are allowed to be activated on the major league roster; the remaining foreign player can practice and prepare with the team or play in the minors. A foreign player, once sent to the minor league team, must wait a week before being allowed to be recalled to the major league.

Any foreign players who have played in the league for more than 9 years will not count towards the foreign players limit on the roster. Furthermore, any foreign nationals who have lived in Taiwan for 3+ years during grade 7–12, 4+ years during college, or have lived in Taiwan for 5+ years while participating in amateur league for 3+ years, are eligible to enter the draft as indigenous players and, likewise, are not counted towards the foreign players limit for the team.

Foreign players from regions other than Japan and South Korea are given Chinese epithets to increase familiarity with Taiwanese fans. These epithets, usually two to three characters in length, are generally loose transliterations of the players' names and are generally chosen as terms meant to convey strength or might. One example is Jeff Andra, whose epithet is Feiyong (飛勇) — meaning, literally, a flying brave man. Recently however, most foreign players are just simply given a direct Chinese transcription. Some players (mostly foreign players) have now adopted the custom in the rest of the world by placing their surnames on the back of their jerseys using the Latin alphabet. Some teams now have adopted Latin alphabet jerseys, a trend that has picked up in recent years. The Fubon Guardians only have uniforms with such, and the other teams are adopting such jerseys on occasion.

=== Current clubs ===
Location of the member organisations

Club	Chinese name	Location	Stadium	Capacity	Founded	Joined
CTBC Brothers	中信兄弟	Taichung City	Taichung Intercontinental Baseball Stadium	20,000	1984	1990
Fubon Guardians	富邦悍將	New Taipei City	Xinzhuang Baseball Stadium	11,600	1989	1993
Rakuten Monkeys	樂天桃猿	Taoyuan City	Rakuten Taoyuan Baseball Stadium	18,000	2003	2003
TSG Hawks	台鋼雄鷹	Kaohsiung City	Chengcing Lake Baseball Stadium	20,000	2022	2023
Uni-President 7-Eleven Lions	統一7-ELEVEN獅	Tainan City	ASPAC Main Stadium	23,500	1989	1990
Wei Chuan Dragons	味全龍	Taipei City	Tianmu Baseball Stadium	10,000	1988; 2019 (refounded)	1990–1999; 2020 (reactivated)

=== Defunct clubs ===
- China Times Eagles (時報鷹) (1993–1997)
- Chinatrust Whales (中信鯨) (1997–2008)
- Macoto Cobras / dmedia T-REX (米迪亞暴龍) (2003–2008)
- Mercuries Tigers (三商虎) (1990–1999)

=== Minor League ===
Location of the minor league member organisations

The CPBL Minor League took shape in late 2003 as a result of cooperation with Chinese Taipei Baseball Association. Alternative service draftees, players deemed eligible to complete their national service obligation in the field of baseball, were sent to the CPBL member organizations to fill their roster. There are currently 6 minor league teams, each plays about 80 games annually. Similar to the NPB's minor leagues, the minor league teams are each owned by CPBL member clubs as reserve teams rather than independent organizations.

Club	Chinese name	Location	Stadium	Capacity
CTBC Farm	中信二軍	Pingtung County	CTBC Park Baseball Stadium	200
Fubon Farm	富邦二軍	Chiayi City	Chiayi City Municipal Baseball Stadium	10,000
Rakuten Farm	樂天二軍	Taoyuan City	Qingpu Sport Park Stadium	2,000
TSG Farm	台鋼二軍	Kaohsiung City	TSUST TSG Academy Stadium	300
Uni Farm	統一二軍	Tainan City	ASPAC Secondary Stadium	3,000
Wei Chuan Farm	味全二軍	Douliu City	Douliu Baseball Stadium	15,000

== Champions ==
Titles by teams as of the end of the 2026 CPBL season:

Team	Titles	Runners-up
CTBC Brothers	10	10
Uni-President 7-Eleven Lions	10	8
Rakuten Monkeys	8	4
Wei Chuan Dragons	6	2
Fubon Guardians	3	5
Chinatrust Whales (defunct)	0	2
China Times Eagles (defunct)	0	1
Macoto Cobras (defunct)	0	1
Mercuries Tigers (defunct)	0	1

The Taiwan Series was not held in 1992, 1994 and 1995 because the Brother Elephants and the Uni-President Lions had won the titles by virtue of winning both half-seasons.

== All-star game ==
An all-star game has been held since 1990.

=== Home Run Derby ===
A home run derby has been held since 1992. It is usually held the day before the all-star game. The most recent winner is Tseng Song-En of the CTBC Brothers, in 2025.

== Awards ==
Overall

- CPBL MVP of the Year Award
- CPBL Rookie of the Year Award
- CPBL Manager of the Year Award
- CPBL Most Progressive Award

Pitching

- CPBL wins champion
- CPBL ERA champion
- CPBL strikeout champion
- CPBL holds champion
- CPBL saves champion

Batting

- CPBL batting champion
- CPBL home run champion
- CPBL RBI champion
- CPBL hits champion
- CPBL stolen bases champion

== Attendances ==
In the 2025 league season, all six Taiwanese baseball clubs recorded an average home league attendance of at least 8,000:

Team	Attendance
CTBC Brothers	11,715
Fubon Guardians	11,407
Wei Chuan Dragons	11,134
Uni-President 7-Eleven Lions	11,286
Rakuten Monkeys	11,220
TSG Hawks	8,364
The CPBL	10,854

== Culture ==
Cheersticks are a pair of plastic sticks, often seen at baseball games in Taiwan. They are banged together to make noise and to cheer on players.

=== Colors of cheersticks in the CPBL ===
- CTBC Brothers: Yellow
- TSG Hawks: Green
- Rakuten Monkeys: Maroon
- Fubon Guardians: Aquamarine
- Uni-President Lions and Uni-President 7-Eleven Lions: Green at the beginning, then changed to orange and green, and all orange now.
- Wei Chuan Dragons: Red

==== Former Teams ====
- Jungo Bears, Sinon Bears and Sinon Bulls: Light green
- Koos Group Whales and Chinatrust Whales: Green and white at the beginning, then changed to blue, then all white.
- Macoto Gida, Macoto Cobras and dmedia T-REX: Red at the beginning, then changed to orange and black, then red and black.
- Mercuries Tigers: Blue
- China Times Eagles: White and black
- EDA Rhinos: Purple

=== Colors of cheersticks in the TML ===
- Chianan Luka: Green
- Kaoping Fala: Yellow
- Taichung Agan: Blue
- Taipei Gida: Red

== See also ==
- Asia Series
- Chinese Taipei national baseball team
- Gambling in Taiwan
- List of professional baseball leagues
- Professional baseball in Taiwan
- Sport in Taiwan
