= 2008 Asia Series =

International baseball competition

Official logo (Japanese language)

The 2008 Asia Series was contested on November 13–16 by the champions of Nippon Professional Baseball's Japan Series, the Korea Baseball Organization's Korean Series, Chinese Professional Baseball League's Taiwan Series, and the championship of the China Baseball League of the People's Republic of China. In 2008, it was the first time that the champion of the China Baseball League participates in instead of the all-star team China Stars. The winning team will receive ¥50 million yen ($0.5 million), the second place team will receive ¥30 million yen, and the other teams will receive ¥10 million yen each. All games were held in Tokyo Dome, Tokyo, Japan. The Saitama Seibu Lions defeated the Uni-President 7-Eleven Lions in the title game to win the championship for Japan. Outfielder Tomoaki Satoh was named the MVP of the series.

== Participating teams ==
- China Baseball League (China): Tianjin Lions, winner of 2008 CBL championship series. Based in Tianjin, China.
- Nippon Professional Baseball (Japan): Saitama Seibu Lions, winner of 2008 Japan Series. Based in Saitama, Japan.
- Korea Baseball Organization (Korea): SK Wyverns, winner of 2008 Korea Series. Based in Incheon, South Korea.
- Chinese Professional Baseball League (Taiwan): Uni-President 7-Eleven Lions, winner of 2008 Taiwan Series. Based in Tainan, Taiwan.

== Matchups ==
All times are Japan Standard Time (UTC+9)

=== November 13 ===
Game 1 12:00 Tokyo Dome
| Team | 1 | 2 | 3 | 4 | 5 | 6 | 7 | 8 | 9 | R | H | E |
|---|---|---|---|---|---|---|---|---|---|---|---|---|
| Tianjin Lions | 0 | 3 | 0 | 1 | 0 | 0 | 0 | 0 | 0 | 4 | 7 | 0 |
| Uni-President 7-Eleven Lions | 0 | 0 | 0 | 0 | 3 | 0 | 0 | 0 | 4 | 7 | 7 | 1 |
WP: Tseng Yi-cheng (曾翊誠) (1–0) LP: Lu Jiangang (吕建刚) (0–1); Home runs: Tianjin: None; Uni-President: Liu Fu-hao (劉芙豪) (1), Pan Wu-hsiung (潘武雄) (1)

Attendance: 2,788 Time: 3:04

Game 2 18:00 Tokyo Dome
| Team | 1 | 2 | 3 | 4 | 5 | 6 | 7 | 8 | 9 | R | H | E |
|---|---|---|---|---|---|---|---|---|---|---|---|---|
| Saitama Seibu Lions | 1 | 0 | 0 | 0 | 2 | 0 | 0 | 0 | 0 | 3 | 7 | 0 |
| SK Wyverns | 0 | 1 | 0 | 3 | 0 | 0 | 0 | 0 | X | 4 | 7 | 1 |
WP: Lee Seung-Ho (이승호) (1–0) LP: Hoashi Kazuyuki (帆足和幸) (0–1); Home runs: Seibu: None; SK: Park Jae-Hong (박재홍) (1), Lee Jae-won (이재원) (1)

Attendance: 9,277 Time: 3:03

=== November 14 ===
Game 3 12:00 Tokyo Dome
| Team | 1 | 2 | 3 | 4 | 5 | 6 | 7 | 8 | 9 | R | H | E |
|---|---|---|---|---|---|---|---|---|---|---|---|---|
| SK Wyverns | 0 | 0 | 7 | 2 | 2 | 0 | 4 | - | - | 15 | 14 | 0 |
| Tianjin Lions | 0 | 0 | 0 | 0 | 0 | 0 | 0 | - | - | 0 | 5 | 3 |
WP: Lee Young-wook (이영욱) (1–0) LP: Chen Wei (陈玮) (0–1); Home runs: SK: Kim Jae-hyun (김재현) (1); Tianjin: None

Attendance: 2,489 Time: 2:27 (shorten: mercy rule)

Game 4 18:00 Tokyo Dome
| Team | 1 | 2 | 3 | 4 | 5 | 6 | 7 | 8 | 9 | R | H | E |
|---|---|---|---|---|---|---|---|---|---|---|---|---|
| Uni-President 7-Eleven Lions | 0 | 0 | 0 | 1 | 0 | 0 | 0 | 0 | 0 | 1 | 2 | 0 |
| Saitama Seibu Lions | 0 | 0 | 0 | 2 | 0 | 0 | 0 | 0 | X | 2 | 5 | 0 |
WP: Takayuki Kishi (岸孝之) (1–0) LP: Pan Wei-Lun (潘威倫) (0–1) Sv: Chikara Onodera (小野寺力) (1)

Attendance: 8,443 Time: 2:34

=== November 15 ===
Game 5 12:00 Tokyo Dome
| Team | 1 | 2 | 3 | 4 | 5 | 6 | 7 | 8 | 9 | R | H | E |
|---|---|---|---|---|---|---|---|---|---|---|---|---|
| Saitama Seibu Lions | 2 | 3 | 6 | 2 | 0 | 3 | 0 | - | - | 16 | 13 | 0 |
| Tianjin Lions | 2 | 0 | 0 | 0 | 0 | 0 | 0 | - | - | 2 | 4 | 2 |
WP: Kohji Onuma (大沼幸二) (1–0) LP: Chen Wei (陈玮) (0–2); Home runs: Seibu: Takeya Nakamura (中村剛也) (1), Ginjiro (銀仁朗) (1); Tianjin: None

Attendance: 8,478 Time: 2:41 (shorten: mercy rule)

Game 6 18:00 Tokyo Dome
| Team | 1 | 2 | 3 | 4 | 5 | 6 | 7 | 8 | 9 | R | H | E |
|---|---|---|---|---|---|---|---|---|---|---|---|---|
| SK Wyverns | 0 | 1 | 0 | 0 | 0 | 2 | 0 | 1 | 0 | 4 | 8 | 1 |
| Uni-President 7-Eleven Lions | 0 | 0 | 0 | 5 | 1 | 0 | 0 | 4 | X | 10 | 12 | 1 |
WP: Lin Yueh-ping (林岳平) (1–0) LP: Chae Byeong-yong (채병용) (0–1); Home runs: SK: Lee Jin-Young (이진영) (1); Uni-President: Liu Fu-hao (劉芙豪) 2 (3), Kao Chih-kang (高志綱) (1), Chen Lien-hung (陳連宏) (1)

Attendance: 5,228 Time: 3:22

=== Round Robin Standings ===
| Position | Team | | | | | Wins | Losses | RS | RA | Tie-breaker |
|---|---|---|---|---|---|---|---|---|---|---|
| 1 | Saitama Seibu Lions | — | ○2–1 | ●3–4 | ○16–2 | 2 | 1 | 21 | 7 | 1–1, 0.292 |
| 2 | Uni-President 7-Eleven Lions | ●1–2 | — | ○10–4 | ○7–4 | 2 | 1 | 18 | 10 | 1–1, 0.385 |
| 3 | SK Wyverns | ○4–3 | ●4–10 | — | ○15–0 | 2 | 1 | 23 | 13 | 1–1, 0.542 |
| 4 | Tianjin Lions | ●2–16 | ●4–7 | ●0–15 | — | 0 | 3 | 6 | 38 | — |

=== Championship, November 16 ===
Game 7 14:00 at Tokyo Dome
| Team | 1 | 2 | 3 | 4 | 5 | 6 | 7 | 8 | 9 | R | H | E |
|---|---|---|---|---|---|---|---|---|---|---|---|---|
| Uni-President 7-Eleven Lions | 0 | 0 | 0 | 0 | 0 | 0 | 0 | 0 | 0 | 0 | 5 | 0 |
| Saitama Seibu Lions | 0 | 0 | 0 | 0 | 0 | 0 | 0 | 0 | 1 | 1 | 6 | 1 |
WP: Shinya Okamoto (岡本真也) (1–0) LP: Pan Wei-lun (潘威倫) (0–2)

Attendance: 18,370 Time: 3:07

== Broadcasting ==
- (Japan) TBS: SK Wyverns vs. Saitama Seibu Lions (G2)
- (Japan) Asahi: Saitama Seibu Lions vs. Uni-President 7-Eleven Lions (G4)
- (Japan) NTV: Tianjin Lions vs. Saitama Seibu Lions (G5), Championship (G7)
- (Japan) J SPORTS: All games.
- (South Korea) MBC ESPN: All games.
- (South Korea) KBS 2TV : SK Wyverns vs. Saitama Seibu Lions (G2)
- (South Korea) SBS : Championship (G7)
- (Taiwan) VL: All games.

== See also ==
- 2008 China Baseball League season
- 2008 Chinese Professional Baseball League season
- 2008 Korea Baseball Organization season
- 2008 Nippon Professional Baseball season
