= 2012 Asia Series =

Official logo

The 2012 Asia Series was the sixth time the Asia Series was held. The tournament was held in Busan, South Korea, and began on 8 November 2012 with the Final held on 12 November.

The tournament included six teams, a two team increase from the previous tournament. As has been the case in previous tournaments, the winners of NPB's 2012 Japan Series, Korea Baseball Organization's (KBO) 2012 Korean Series, Chinese Professional Baseball League's (CPBL) 2012 Taiwan Series and the Australian Baseball League's 2012 Championship Series qualified. The China Baseball League (CBL) returned to the Asia Series, with the 2012 Champion representing the country, and the host team, Busan's Lotte Giants, also participated in the tournament.

== Participating teams ==
League	Team	Qualification	Location
Australian Baseball League	(Australia) Perth Heat	2011–12 ABL champions	Perth, Australia
China Baseball League	China Stars	2012 CBL champions	China
Chinese Professional Baseball League	(Taiwan) Lamigo Monkeys	2012 CPBL champions	Taoyuan, Taiwan
Korea Baseball Organization	(South Korea) Samsung Lions	2012 KBO champions	Daegu, South Korea
Korea Baseball Organization	(South Korea) Lotte Giants	Hosts	Busan, South Korea
Nippon Professional Baseball	(Japan) Yomiuri Giants	2012 NPB champions	Bunkyo, Tokyo, Japan

== Format ==
The six teams are placed in two groups of three (see below), with each team playing two games - one against each other member of their group. The team with the best record in each group will advance to the Final.

== Round-robin stage ==
=== Group A ===
Pos	Team	W	L	Pct.	GB	R	RA
1	(Taiwan) Lamigo Monkeys	2	0	1.000	–	17	1
2	(South Korea) Samsung Lions	1	1	.500	1	9	3
3	China Stars	0	2	.000	2	1	23

8 November 12:00 at Sajik Baseball Stadium
Team	1	2	3	4	5	6	7	8	9	R	H	E
(Taiwan) Lamigo Monkeys	3	0	6	1	0	4	0	X	X	14	15	1
China Stars	0	0	0	1	0	0	0	X	X	1	6	1
WP: Treng Chou-hau (1-0) LP: Luo Xia (0-1); Home runs: (Taiwan) : Lin Chih-sheng (1), Chen Chin-feng (1), Shih Chih-wei (1) (China) : None; Boxscore

9 November 19:00 at Sajik Baseball Stadium
Team	1	2	3	4	5	6	7	8	9	R	H	E
(South Korea) Samsung Lions	0	0	0	0	0	0	0	0	0	0	3	2
(Taiwan) Lamigo Monkeys	0	0	0	1	0	0	2	0	X	3	8	0
WP: Mike Loree (1-0) LP: Bae Young-Soo (0-1); Home runs: (South Korea) : None (Taiwan) : Lin Hung-Yu (1); Boxscore

10 November 19:00 at Sajik Baseball Stadium
Team	1	2	3	4	5	6	7	8	9	R	H	E
China Stars	0	0	0	0	0	0	0	0	0	0	5	0
(South Korea) Samsung Lions	6	0	2	1	0	0	0	0	X	9	14	0
WP: Jung In Wook (1-0) LP: Bu Tao (0-1); Boxscore

=== Group B ===
Pos	Team	W	L	Pct.	GB	R	RA
1	(Japan) Yomiuri Giants	2	0	1.000	-	12	1
2	(South Korea) Lotte Giants	1	1	.500	1	6	6
3	(Australia) Perth Heat	0	2	.000	2	2	13

8 November 19:00 at Sajik Baseball Stadium
Team	1	2	3	4	5	6	7	8	9	R	H	E
(South Korea) Lotte Giants	1	0	0	2	0	3	0	0	0	6	12	0
(Australia) Perth Heat	0	0	0	0	1	0	0	0	0	1	3	3
WP: Song Seung-Jun (1-0) LP: Virgil Vasquez (0-1); Boxscore

9 November 12:00 at Sajik Baseball Stadium
Team	1	2	3	4	5	6	7	8	9	R	H	E
(Australia) Perth Heat	0	0	0	0	0	1	0	0	0	1	6	4
(Japan) Yomiuri Giants	0	0	0	0	0	1	3	3	X	7	12	1
WP: Yasunari Takagi (1-0) LP: Anthony Claggett (0-1); Boxscore

10 November 12:00 at Sajik Baseball Stadium
Team	1	2	3	4	5	6	7	8	9	R	H	E
(Japan) Yomiuri Giants	1	0	1	1	0	1	0	0	1	5	11	0
(South Korea) Lotte Giants	0	0	0	0	0	0	0	0	0	0	5	2
WP: Hirokazu Sawamura (1-0) LP: Ko Won Jun (0-1); Boxscore

== Final ==
11 November 14:00 at Sajik Baseball Stadium
Team	1	2	3	4	5	6	7	8	9	R	H	E
(Japan) Yomiuri Giants	0	4	0	0	0	1	1	0	0	6	10	1
(Taiwan) Lamigo Monkeys	0	0	0	1	0	0	0	0	2	3	6	1
WP: Ryosuke Miyaguni (1-0) LP: Paul Phillips (0-1); Home runs: (Japan) : Kazunari Sanematsu (1) (Taiwan) : Lin Chih-sheng (2); Boxscore

== See also ==
- 2011–12 Australian Baseball League season
- 2012 Chinese Professional Baseball League season
- 2012 Korea Baseball Organization season
- 2012 Nippon Professional Baseball season
