= 2005 Asia Series =

Tournament details
- Country: Japan
- Dates: 10 – 13 November
- Teams: 4 (4 countries)

Final positions
- Champions: (Japan) Chiba Lotte Marines (1st title)
- Runners-up: (South Korea) Samsung Lions

Tournament statistics
- Games played: 7
- Attendance: 120,877 (17,268 per game)

Awards
- MVP: Benny Agbayani (Chiba Lotte Marines)

The 2005 Asia Series, officially branded as the 2005 Konami Cup Asia Series, was the first edition of the Asia Series, an international club baseball competition contested by the champions of all four professional leagues associated with the World Baseball Softball Confederation (WBSC). All games were held in the Tokyo Dome in Japan. The tournament was sponsored by Nippon Professional Baseball and Konami. The Chiba Lotte Marines defeated the Samsung Lions in the title game to win their first title. Outfielder Benny Agbayani of the Marines was named the MVP of the series.

== Participating teams ==
- China Baseball League (China): China Stars, an all-star team of the China Baseball League of China.
- Nippon Professional Baseball (Japan): Chiba Lotte Marines, winner of the 2005 Japan Series. Based in Chiba, Japan.
- Korea Baseball Organization (Korea): Samsung Lions, winner of the 2005 Korea Series. Based in Daegu, South Korea.
- Chinese Professional Baseball League (Taiwan): Sinon Bulls, winner of the 2005 Taiwan Series. Based in Taichung, Taiwan.

== Matchups ==
All times are Japan Standard Time (UTC+9)

=== November 10 ===
Game 1 11:00 Tokyo Dome
Team	1	2	3	4	5	6	7	8	9	R	H	E
Sinon Bulls	0	0	0	1	4	0	0	1	0	6	9	1
China Stars	0	0	0	0	0	0	0	0	0	0	5	0
WP: Lenin Picota (1–0) LP: Chen Kun (陳坤) (0–1); Home runs: Sinon: Chang Chien-Ming (張建銘) (1); China: None

Attendance: 2,643 Time: 2:37

Game 2 18:00 Tokyo Dome
Team	1	2	3	4	5	6	7	8	9	R	H	E
Samsung Lions	0	0	0	0	0	2	0	0	0	2	10	0
Chiba Lotte Marines	3	0	0	1	2	0	0	0	X	6	8	1
WP: Hiroyuki Kobayashi (小林宏之) (1–0) LP: Martin Vargas (0–1); Home runs: Samsung: None; Chiba: Tasuku Hashimoto (橋本将) (1)

Attendance: 27,305 Time: 3:05

=== November 11 ===
Game 3 11:00 Tokyo Dome
Team	1	2	3	4	5	6	7	8	9	R	H	E
China Stars	0	0	0	0	0	3	0	0	0	3	9	3
Samsung Lions	0	0	0	3	3	0	0	2	X	8	13	0
WP: Jun Byung-Ho (전병호) (1–0) LP: Lai Guojun (賴國鈞) (0–1) Sv: Lim Dong-Gyu (임동규) (1)

Attendance: 2,036 Time: 3:15

Game 4 18:00 Tokyo Dome
Team	1	2	3	4	5	6	7	8	9	R	H	E
Chiba Lotte Marines	1	2	0	0	3	1	5	-	-	12	10	0
Sinon Bulls	0	0	0	0	0	1	0	-	-	1	4	2
WP: Naoyuki Shimizu (清水直行) (1–0) LP: Yang Chien-fu (陽建福) (0–1); Home runs: Chiba: Benny Agbayani 2 (2); Sinon: None

Attendance: 18,911 Time: 2:20
Note: Game ended at seventh inning due to mercy rule

=== November 12 ===
Game 5 12:00 Tokyo Dome
Team	1	2	3	4	5	6	7	8	9	R	H	E
China Stars	1	0	0	0	0	0	0	0	0	1	8	2
Chiba Lotte Marines	0	0	0	0	3	0	0	0	X	3	4	4
WP: Satoru Komiyama (小宮山悟) (1–0) LP: Zhang Li (張力) (0–1) Sv: Masahide Kobayashi (小林雅英) (1)

Attendance: 26,564 Time: 2:48

Game 6 19:00 Tokyo Dome
Team	1	2	3	4	5	6	7	8	9	R	H	E
Sinon Bulls	0	0	0	0	3	0	0	0	0	3	4	2
Samsung Lions	3	1	0	0	0	0	0	0	X	4	5	1
WP: Tim Harikkala (1–0) LP: Osvaldo Martinez (0–1) Sv: Oh Seung-Hwan (오승환) (1)

Attendance: 6,340 Time: 2:36

=== Round-Robin Standings ===
Position	Team	Chiba Lotte Marines	Samsung Lions	Sinon Bulls	China Stars	Wins	Losses	RS	RA
1	Chiba Lotte Marines	—	○6–2	○12–1	○3–1	3	0	21	4
2	Samsung Lions	●2–6	—	○4–3	○8–3	2	1	14	12
3	Sinon Bulls	●1–12	●3–4	—	○6–0	1	2	10	16
4	China Stars	●1–3	●3–8	●0–6	—	0	3	4	17

=== Championship, November 13 ===
Game 7 18:00 at Tokyo Dome
Team	1	2	3	4	5	6	7	8	9	R	H	E
Samsung Lions	0	0	1	0	0	0	0	0	2	3	13	0
Chiba Lotte Marines	1	0	2	2	0	0	0	0	X	5	6	2
WP: Shunsuke Watanabe (渡辺俊介) (1–0) LP: Bae Young-Soo (배영수) (0–1); Home runs: Samsung: None; Chiba: Masato Watanabe (渡辺正人) (1)

Attendance: 37,078 Time: 3:27
