= 2006 Asia Series =

2005 Asia Series

Tournament details
- Country: Japan
- Dates: 9 – 12 November
- Teams: 4 (4 countries)

Final positions
- Champions: (Japan) Hokkaido Nippon Ham Fighters (1st title)
- Runners-up: (Taiwan) La New Bears

Tournament statistics
- Games played: 7
- Attendance: 73,698 (10,528 per game)

Awards
- MVP: Yu Darvish (Hokkaido Nippon Ham Fighters)

The 2006 Asia Series, officially branded as the 2006 Konami Cup Asia Series, was the second edition of the Asia Series club baseball tournament, following the inaugural tournament the year prior, with all games being played at the Tokyo Dome in Tokyo, Japan. In the final on 12 November, the Hokkaido Nippon-Ham Fighters defeated Taiwan's La New Bears to clinch their first title. Starting pitcher Yu Darvish of the Fighters was named the tournament's most valuable player.

== Participating teams ==
- China Baseball League (China): China Stars, an all-star team of the China Baseball League of China.
- Nippon Professional Baseball (Japan): Hokkaido Nippon Ham Fighters, winner of the 2006 Japan Series. Based in Sapporo, Japan.
- Korea Baseball Organization (Korea): Samsung Lions, winner of the 2006 Korean Series. Based in Daegu, South Korea.
- Chinese Professional Baseball League (Taiwan): La New Bears, winner of 2006 Taiwan Series. Based in Kaohsiung, Taiwan.

== Matchups ==
All times are Japan Standard Time (UTC+9)

=== November 9 ===
Game 1 12:00 Tokyo Dome
| Team | 1 | 2 | 3 | 4 | 5 | 6 | 7 | 8 | 9 | R | H | E |
|---|---|---|---|---|---|---|---|---|---|---|---|---|
| La New Bears | 0 | 0 | 1 | 0 | 9 | 0 | 0 | 2 | - | 12 | 18 | 1 |
| China Stars | 0 | 0 | 0 | 2 | 0 | 0 | 0 | 0 | - | 2 | 8 | 2 |
WP: Fiore James (1–0) LP: Chen Faifeng (陈海峰) (0–1); Home runs: La New: Chen Chin-feng (陳金鋒) 2 (2), Chen Feng-min (陳峰民) (1); China: None

Attendance: 2,127 Time: 2:37
Note: Game ended due to mercy rule.

Game 2 18:00 Tokyo Dome
| Team | 1 | 2 | 3 | 4 | 5 | 6 | 7 | 8 | 9 | R | H | E |
|---|---|---|---|---|---|---|---|---|---|---|---|---|
| Hokkaido Nippon Ham Fighters | 0 | 0 | 0 | 1 | 0 | 4 | 0 | 0 | 2 | 7 | 10 | 1 |
| Samsung Lions | 0 | 0 | 0 | 1 | 0 | 0 | 0 | 0 | 0 | 1 | 3 | 0 |
WP: Takehiko Oshimoto (押本健彥) (1–0) LP: Lim Dong-Gyu (임동규) (0–1); Home runs: Hokkaido: Atsunori Inaba (稲葉篤紀) (1); Samsung: None

Attendance: 15,147 Time: 3:14

=== November 10 ===
Game 3 12:30 Tokyo Dome
| Team | 1 | 2 | 3 | 4 | 5 | 6 | 7 | 8 | 9 | R | H | E |
|---|---|---|---|---|---|---|---|---|---|---|---|---|
| China Stars | 0 | 0 | 0 | 0 | 0 | 1 | 0 | - | - | 1 | 4 | 3 |
| Samsung Lions | 0 | 0 | 0 | 2 | 10 | 1 | X | - | - | 13 | 15 | 1 |
WP: Jun Byung-Ho (전병호) (1–0) LP: Guo Youhua (郭有華) (0–1)

Attendance: 2,024 Time: 2:27
Note: Game ended due to mercy rule.

Game 4 18:30 Tokyo Dome
| Team | 1 | 2 | 3 | 4 | 5 | 6 | 7 | 8 | 9 | R | H | E |
|---|---|---|---|---|---|---|---|---|---|---|---|---|
| Hokkaido Nippon Ham Fighters | 0 | 0 | 0 | 0 | 0 | 0 | 0 | 2 | 0 | 2 | 5 | 0 |
| La New Bears | 0 | 0 | 0 | 0 | 1 | 0 | 0 | 0 | 0 | 1 | 4 | 0 |
WP: Masaru Takeda (武田勝) (1–0) LP: Morel Rafael (0–1) Sv: Micheal (マイケル中村) (1); Home runs: Hokkaido: None; La New: Tseng Hao-chu (曾豪駒) (1)

Attendance: 11,038 Time: 2:43

=== November 11 ===
Game 5 13:00 Tokyo Dome
| Team | 1 | 2 | 3 | 4 | 5 | 6 | 7 | 8 | 9 | R | H | E |
|---|---|---|---|---|---|---|---|---|---|---|---|---|
| China Stars | 0 | 0 | 0 | 0 | 0 | 0 | 0 | 0 | 1 | 1 | 9 | 1 |
| Hokkaido Nippon Ham Fighters | 2 | 1 | 2 | 0 | 1 | 0 | 0 | 0 | X | 6 | 13 | 0 |
WP: Satoru Kanemura (金村暁) (1–0) LP: Zhang Li (張力) (0–1); Home runs: China: Li Lei (李磊) (1); Hokkaido: Shinji Takahashi (高橋信二) (1)

Attendance: 12,337 Time: 2:46

Game 6 19:00 Tokyo Dome
| Team | 1 | 2 | 3 | 4 | 5 | 6 | 7 | 8 | 9 | R | H | E |
|---|---|---|---|---|---|---|---|---|---|---|---|---|
| Samsung Lions | 0 | 0 | 0 | 2 | 0 | 0 | 0 | 0 | 0 | 2 | 6 | 0 |
| La New Bears | 0 | 0 | 0 | 2 | 0 | 1 | 0 | 0 | X | 3 | 5 | 0 |
WP: Huang Chun-chung (黃俊中) (1–0) LP: Lim Chang-Yong (임창용) (0–1) Sv: Morel Rafael (1); Home runs: Samsung: Yang Joon-Hyuk (양준혁) (1); La New: Lin Chih-sheng (林智勝) (1)

Attendance: 6,445 Time: 2:57

=== Round-Robin Standings ===
| Position | Team | Hokkaido Nippon Ham Fighters | La New Bears | Samsung Lions | China Stars | Wins | Losses | RS | RA |
|---|---|---|---|---|---|---|---|---|---|
| 1 | Hokkaido Nippon Ham Fighters | — | ○2–1 | ○7–1 | ○6–1 | 3 | 0 | 15 | 3 |
| 2 | La New Bears | ●1–2 | — | ○3–2 | ○12–2 | 2 | 1 | 16 | 6 |
| 3 | Samsung Lions | ●1–7 | ●2–3 | — | ○13–1 | 1 | 2 | 16 | 11 |
| 4 | China Stars | ●1–6 | ●2–12 | ●1–13 | — | 0 | 3 | 4 | 32 |

=== Championship, November 12 ===
Game 7 18:00 at Tokyo Dome
| Team | 1 | 2 | 3 | 4 | 5 | 6 | 7 | 8 | 9 | R | H | E |
|---|---|---|---|---|---|---|---|---|---|---|---|---|
| La New Bears | 0 | 0 | 0 | 0 | 0 | 0 | 0 | 0 | 0 | 0 | 2 | 3 |
| Hokkaido Nippon Ham Fighters | 0 | 0 | 0 | 0 | 0 | 0 | 1 | 0 | X | 1 | 5 | 0 |
WP: Yu Darvish (ダルビッシュ 有) (1–0) LP: Fiore James (1–1) Sv: Micheal (マイケル中村) (2)

Attendance: 24,580 Time: 2:33
