= 2011 Asia Series =

Tournament details
- Country: Taiwan
- Dates: 25 – 29 November
- Teams: 4 (4 countries)

Final positions
- Champions: (South Korea) Samsung Lions (1st title)
- Runners-up: (Japan) Fukuoka SoftBank Hawks

Tournament statistics
- Games played: 7
- Attendance: 57,088 (8,155 per game)

Awards
- MVP: Jang Won-sam (Samsung Lions)

The 2011 Asia Series was the fifth time the Asia Series has been held, and the first after a two-year break. The tournament was held in Taiwan, the first time it has been held outside Japan. Though originally scheduled to commence on 11 November, the tournament was postponed by two weeks to allow for the delayed finish to the Nippon Professional Baseball (NPB) season due to the Tōhoku earthquake and tsunami. The new schedule has the opening games to be played on 25 November, and the championship game concluded the tournament on 29 November.

As had been the case in previous tournaments, the winners of NPB's 2011 Japan Series, Korea Baseball Organization's (KBO) 2011 Korean Series and Chinese Professional Baseball League's (CPBL) 2011 Taiwan Series competed. Though originally included, no team represented the China Baseball League (CBL) due to ″concerns about the team's makeup″. An Australian team participated in the tournament for the first time: the Perth Heat were invited as winners of the Australian Baseball League's (ABL) 2011 Championship series.

The Samsung Lions defeated the Fukuoka SoftBank Hawks in the title game to become the first non-Japanese champion. Starting pitcher Jang Won-Sam was named the MVP of the series.

== Participating teams ==
League	Team	Qualification	Location
Australian Baseball League	(Australia) Perth Heat	2010–11 ABL champions	Perth, Australia
Chinese Professional Baseball League	(Taiwan) Uni-President 7-Eleven Lions	2011 CPBL champions	Tainan, Taiwan
Korea Baseball Organization	(South Korea) Samsung Lions	2011 KBO champions	Daegu, South Korea
Nippon Professional Baseball	(Japan) Fukuoka SoftBank Hawks	2011 NPB champions	Fukuoka, Japan

== Format ==
Each of the four teams participated in a round-robin series, playing each other team once. The two teams with the best win-loss percentage faced each other in the final, with the team finishing higher considered the "home team", meaning that they had the advantage of batting last. In previous tournaments, if teams were tied a series of tiebreakers were used to decide which teams qualified for the final and in what order, firstly using the head-to-head win–loss records amongst tied teams, and if necessary the ranking based on the lowest team run average.

== Round-robin stage ==
Pos	Team	W	L	Pct.	GB	R	RA
1	(Japan) Fukuoka SoftBank Hawks	3	0	1.000	–	19	5
2	(South Korea) Samsung Lions	2	1	.667	1	16	14
3	(Taiwan) Uni-President 7-Eleven Lions	1	2	.333	2	11	14
4	(Australia) Perth Heat	0	3	.000	3	4	17

25 November 12:00 at Taichung Intercontinental Baseball Stadium
Team	1	2	3	4	5	6	7	8	9	R	H	E
(Australia) Perth Heat	0	0	1	0	0	1	0	0	0	2	7	4
(South Korea) Samsung Lions	0	0	3	0	0	1	0	6	X	10	12	0
WP: Jang Won-Sam (1–0) LP: Daniel Schmidt (0–1); Home runs: (Australia) : Allan de San Miguel (1) (South Korea) : Shin Myung-Chul (1); Attendance: 1,599; Boxscore

25 November 19:00 at Taichung Intercontinental Baseball Stadium
Team	1	2	3	4	5	6	7	8	9	R	H	E
(Taiwan) Uni-President 7-Eleven Lions	0	2	0	0	0	0	0	0	3	5	9	2
(Japan) Fukuoka SoftBank Hawks	1	0	2	0	3	0	0	0	X	6	7	0
WP: Nagisa Arakaki (1–0) LP: Ryan Glynn (0–1) Sv: Takehito Kanazawa (1); Attendance: 19,026; Boxscore

26 November 12:00 at Taichung Intercontinental Baseball Stadium
Team	1	2	3	4	5	6	7	8	9	R	H	E
(Japan) Fukuoka SoftBank Hawks	0	5	0	0	2	1	0	1	0	9	11	2
(South Korea) Samsung Lions	0	0	0	0	0	0	0	0	0	0	5	2
WP: Hiroki Yamada (1–0) LP: Lee Woo-Seon (0–1); Attendance: 7,131; Boxscore

26 November 18:00 at Taichung Intercontinental Baseball Stadium
Team	1	2	3	4	5	6	7	8	9	10	R	H	E
(Taiwan) Uni-President 7-Eleven Lions	0	0	0	0	0	2	0	0	0	1	3	10	0
(Australia) Perth Heat	0	0	0	0	0	0	0	2	0	0	2	4	3
WP: Wang Ching-ming (1–0) LP: Cameron Lamb (0–1) Sv: Lin Yueh-ping (1); Attendance: 7,301; Boxscore

27 November 13:00 at Taoyuan International Baseball Stadium
Team	1	2	3	4	5	6	7	8	9	R	H	E
(Japan) Fukuoka SoftBank Hawks	1	0	0	0	2	1	0	0	0	4	9	1
(Australia) Perth Heat	0	0	0	0	0	0	0	0	0	0	3	3
WP: Sho Iwasaki (1–0) LP: Trevor Caughey (0–1); Attendance: 5,703; Boxscore

27 November 19:00 at Taoyuan International Baseball Stadium
Team	1	2	3	4	5	6	7	8	9	R	H	E
(South Korea) Samsung Lions	0	0	2	1	0	0	0	2	1	6	10	1
(Taiwan) Uni-President 7-Eleven Lions	0	0	0	1	0	2	0	0	0	3	6	1
WP: Kwon Oh-Joon (1-0) LP: Ryan Glynn (0-2) Sv: Oh Seung-Hwan (1); Attendance: 12,000; Boxscore

== Final ==
29 November 19:00 at Taichung Intercontinental Baseball Stadium
Team	1	2	3	4	5	6	7	8	9	R	H	E
(South Korea) Samsung Lions	0	0	0	0	5	0	0	0	0	5	8	0
(Japan) Fukuoka SoftBank Hawks	1	0	0	0	0	0	0	2	0	3	10	1
WP: Jang Won-Sam (2–0) LP: Sho Iwasaki (1–1) Sv: Oh Seung-Hwan (2); Attendance: 4,328; Boxscore

== See also ==
- 2010–11 Australian Baseball League season
- 2011 Chinese Professional Baseball League season
- 2011 Korea Baseball Organization season
- 2011 Nippon Professional Baseball season
- List of sporting events in Taiwan
