= Chen Lien-hung =

Taiwanese baseball player

Lien-hung Chen
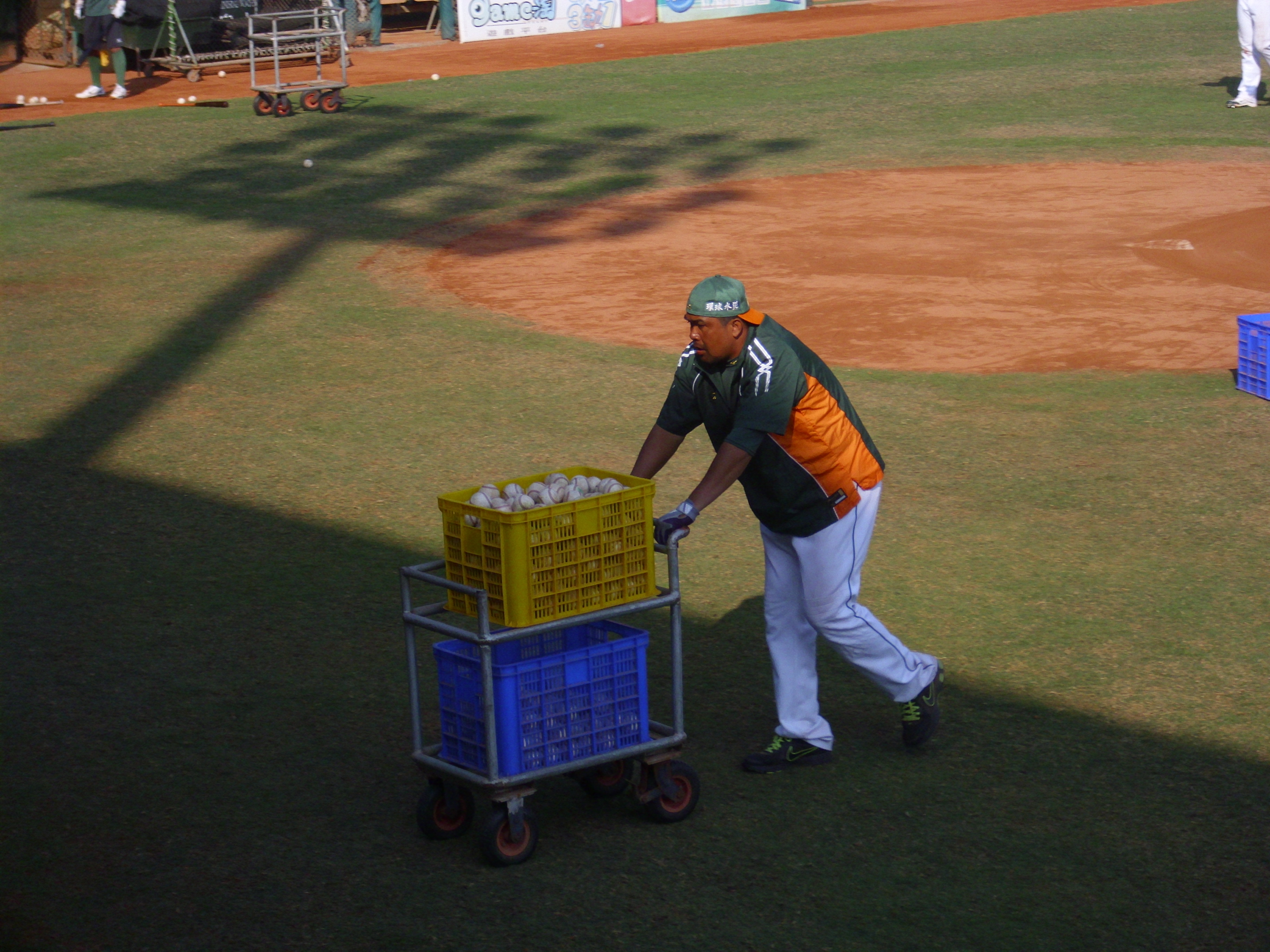
- Right fielder / Manager / Coach
- Batted: Right Threw: Right

CPBL debut
- February 25, 1997, for the Chinatrust Whales

Last CPBL appearance
- September 24, 2011, for the Uni-President Lions

Career statistics (through 2011)
- Games: 1245
- Batting average: 0.299
- Hits: 1196
- Home runs: 112
- RBIs: 611
- Stolen bases: 102
- Stats at Baseball Reference

Teams
- As player: Chinatrust Whales (1997–2002); Uni-President Lions (2003–2011); As manager: Uni-President Lions (2013–2015); Fubon Guardians (2018–2019); As coach: Uni-President Lions (2012–; 2016,2020-2023）: Fubon Guardians (2024–2025)

Chen Lien-hung (Chinese: 陳連宏; pinyin: Chén Liánhóng; born September 13, 1973 in Tainan, Taiwan) is a Taiwanese former baseball player who played for the Chinatrust Whales and Uni-President Lions of the Chinese Professional Baseball League.

On August 4, 2013, he was named the manager for the Uni-President Lions. On February 16, 2015, Chen was named the hitting coach of the Uni-President Lions. On January 5, 2018, he was named the Second Team Coach for the Fubon Guardians .

== Konami Cup ==
Chen hit two home runs against China Stars in Konami Cup Asia Series 2007: one two-runs and one grand slam. His younger brother, Chen Chin-feng of La New Bears, also hit a two-runs home run and a grand slam against China Stars in Konami Cup Asia Series 2006.

== See also ==
- Chinese Professional Baseball League
- Uni-President Lions
