= 2011 CPBL season =

The 2011 Chinese Professional Baseball League (CPBL) season began on March 19 in Kaohsiung County when the defending champion Lamigo Monkeys played host to the Uni-President 7-Eleven Lions. The season concluded in late October with the Uni-President 7-Eleven Lions defeating the Lamigo Monkeys in Game 7 of the Taiwan Series.

== Competition ==
Four teams, the Lamigo Monkeys, Uni-President 7-Eleven Lions, Sinon Bulls and Brother Elephants will contest the CPBL, the highest level of professional baseball played in Taiwan. The season is divided into two halves, with each team playing sixty games in each half. The winners for each half-season plus the non-winner with the best overall record will qualify for the playoffs. In the event that the same team wins both halves, the next two teams with the best overall records will advance.

== Standings ==
=== First Half standings ===
Team	G	W	T	L	Pct.	GB
Uni-President 7-Eleven Lions	60	37	1	22	.627	--
Lamigo Monkeys	60	33	1	26	.559	4.0
Brother Elephants	60	28	0	32	.467	9.5
Sinon Bulls	60	20	2	38	.345	16.5

=== Second Half Standings ===
Team	G	W	T	L	Pct.	GB
Lamigo Monkeys	60	33	1	26	.559	--
Brother Elephants	60	32	0	28	.533	1.5
Uni-President 7-Eleven Lions	60	28	2	30	.483	4.5
Sinon Bulls	60	25	1	34	.424	8.0

=== Overall standings ===
Team	G	W	T	L	Pct.	GB	RS	RA
Lamigo Monkeys	120	66	2	52	.559	--	627	575
Uni-President 7-Eleven Lions	120	65	3	52	.556	0.5	624	563
Brother Elephants	120	60	0	60	.500	8.0	597	576
Sinon Bulls	120	45	3	72	.385	20.5	555	689

- Green denotes first half or second half champion.

== Statistical leaders ==
=== Hitting ===
Stat	Player	Team	Total
HR	Lin Hung-Yu	Lamigo Monkeys	22
AVG	Zhang Zheng-wei	Brother Elephants	0.351
H	Zhang Zheng-wei	Brother Elephants	170
RBIs	Lin Hung-Yu	Lamigo Monkeys	106
SB	Zhang Zheng-wei	Brother Elephants	31

=== Pitching ===
Stat	Player	Team	Total
W	Orlando Román	Brother Elephants	16
ERA	Ken Ray	Lamigo Monkeys	2.85
SO	Orlando Román	Brother Elephants	161
SV	Hsu Ming-chieh	Lamigo Monkeys	30
Hld	Wang Ching-li	Uni-President 7-Eleven Lions	26

== Month MVP ==
Month	Item	Player	Team
March	Pitcher	Pan Wei-lun	Uni-President 7-Eleven Lions
	Hitter	Lin Hung-Yu	Lamigo Monkeys
April	Pitcher	Adrian Burnside	Lamigo Monkeys
	Hitter	Lin Chih-sheng	Lamigo Monkeys
May	Pitcher	Dan Reichert	Uni-President 7-Eleven Lions
	Hitter	Chen Kuan-jen	Brother Elephants
June	Pitcher	Tyler Lumsden	Brother Elephants
	Hitter	Chen Kuan-jen	Brother Elephants
July	Pitcher	Steve Hammond	Lamigo Monkeys
	Hitter	Kao Kuo-ching	Uni-President 7-Eleven Lions
August	Pitcher	Luo Cheng-lung	Sinon Bulls
	Hitter	Zhang Zheng-wei	Brother Elephants
September	Pitcher	Orlando Román	Brother Elephants
	Hitter	Lin Hung-Yu	Lamigo Monkeys
October	Pitcher	Orlando Román	Brother Elephants
	Hitter	Lin Hung-Yu	Lamigo Monkeys

== Final ==
=== Participants ===
- Uni-President 7-Eleven Lions - Winner of the first half-season.
- Lamigo Monkeys - Winner of the second half-season.

The Lions and the Monkeys played each other in 40 regular season games, and the Monkeys had the upper hand with 21 wins, 18 losses, and one tied game. The two teams also played each other in the 2006 Taiwan Series and 2007 Taiwan Series; the Monkeys defeated the Lions in 2006, but the Lions claimed the title in 2007.

== Rules ==
All regular season rules apply with the following exceptions:

- Each team is allowed to register 28 players on its active roster.
- No tied games.
- Two outfield umpires are added to the games.

Uni-President 7-Eleven Lions (4) vs. Lamigo Monkeys (1)

Game	Date	Score	Location	Time	Attendance
1	October 15	Uni-President 7-Eleven Lions 3 Lamigo Monkeys 2	Taoyuan International Baseball Stadium	3:53	11,113
2	October 16	Uni-President 7-Eleven Lions 8 Lamigo Monkeys 7 (13 innings)	Taoyuan International Baseball Stadium	4:58	10,105
3	October 18	Lamigo Monkeys 4 Uni-President 7-Eleven Lions 1	Tainan Municipal Baseball Stadium	3:05	6062
4	October 19	Lamigo Monkeys 2 Uni-President 7-Eleven Lions 3	Tainan Municipal Baseball Stadium	3:21	7518
5	October 20	Lamigo Monkeys 6 Uni-President 7-Eleven Lions 10	Tainan Municipal Baseball Stadium	3:51	10,718
