= Young-wook =

- Hangul: 영욱
- RR: Yeonguk
- MR: Yŏnguk

Young-wook (various spellings) is a Korean given name.

People with this name include:

- Jo Yeong-wook (born 1962), South Korean film music composer
- Yung Wook Yoo (born 1977), South Korean pianist
- Lee Young-uk (born 1980), South Korean baseball pitcher
- Lee Young-wook (born 1985), South Korean baseball outfielder
- Cho Young-wook (born 1999), South Korean football forward

== See also ==
- List of Korean given names
