= 2007 Asia Series =

Official logo (Japanese language)

The third annual Konami Cup Asia Series was held in November 2007 with four teams participating. The champions from the domestic leagues in Japan, South Korea, Taiwan along with an all-star team from China took part in the competition. The tournament was sponsored by the Nippon Professional Baseball Association and Konami Corporation. All games were held in Tokyo Dome, Tokyo, Japan. The Chunichi Dragons defeated the SK Wyverns in the title game to win the championship for Japan. Infielder Hirokazu Ibata was named the MVP of the series.

== Participating teams ==
- China Baseball League (China): China Stars, an all-star team of China Baseball League.
- Nippon Professional Baseball (Japan): Chunichi Dragons, winner of 2007 Japan Series. Based in Nagoya, Japan.
- Korea Baseball Organization (Korea): SK Wyverns, winner of 2007 Korea Series. Based in Incheon, South Korea.
- Chinese Professional Baseball League (Taiwan): Uni-President Lions, winner of 2007 Taiwan Series. Based in Tainan, Taiwan.

== Round Robin ==
=== Standings ===
Pos	Team	Pld	W	L	RF	RA	RD	PCT	GB	Qualification	(South Korea)	(Japan)	(Chinese Taipei)	(China)
1	(South Korea) SK Wyverns	3	3	0	32	4	+28	1.000	—	Advance to Championship	—	6–3	13–1	13–0
2	(Japan) Chunichi Dragons	3	2	1	16	9	+7	.667	1	Advance to Championship	3–6	—	4–2	9–1
3	(Chinese Taipei) Uni-President Lions	3	1	2	12	22	−10	.333	2		1–13	2–4	—	9–5
4	China Stars	3	0	3	6	31	−25	.000	3		0–13	1–9	5–9	—

=== Results ===
All times are Japan Standard Time (UTC+9)

November 8 12:00 Tokyo Dome (Game 1)
Team	1	2	3	4	5	6	7	8	9	R	H	E
Uni-President Lions	1	0	0	0	0	0	6	0	2	9	14	0
China Stars	2	1	0	0	1	0	0	0	1	5	16	0
WP: Nelson Figueroa (1–0) LP: Xu Zheng (徐錚) (0–1); Home runs: Uni-President: Chen Lien-hung (陳連宏) 2 (2), Yang Sen (陽森) (1); China: None; Attendance: 2,978

November 18:00 Tokyo Dome (Game 2)
Team	1	2	3	4	5	6	7	8	9	R	H	E
SK Wyverns	0	0	0	1	0	2	3	0	0	6	8	0
Chunichi Dragons	0	0	0	0	0	0	2	1	0	3	6	2
WP: Kim Kwang-Hyun (김광현) (1–0) LP: Nakata Kenichi (中田賢一) (0–1); Home runs: SK: None; Chunichi: Inoue Kazuki (井上一樹) (1); Attendance: 19,095

November 9 12:30 Tokyo Dome (Game 3) (F/7)
Team	1	2	3	4	5	6	7	8	9	R	H	E
China Stars	0	0	0	0	0	0	0	-	-	0	4	3
SK Wyverns	0	1	4	1	3	4	X	-	-	13	10	0
WP: Michael Desport Romano (1–0) LP: Chen Junyi (陈俊毅) (0–1); Attendance: 2,547

November 9 18:30 Tokyo Dome (Game 4)
Team	1	2	3	4	5	6	7	8	9	R	H	E
Chunichi Dragons	0	0	1	0	1	0	1	0	1	4	8	1
Uni-President Lions	0	1	0	0	0	0	1	0	0	2	9	2
WP: Kenta Asakura (朝倉健太) (1–0) LP: Pan Wei-lun (潘威倫) (0–1) Sv: Hitoki Iwase (岩瀬仁紀) (1); Attendance: 11,167

November 10 12:00 Tokyo Dome (Game 5)
Team	1	2	3	4	5	6	7	8	9	R	H	E
China Stars	1	0	0	0	0	0	0	0	0	1	4	3
Chunichi Dragons	0	0	0	0	1	2	6	0	X	9	10	0
WP: Ogasawara Takashi (小笠原孝) (1–0) LP: Lu Jiangang (吕建刚) (0–1); Home runs: China: None; Chunichi: Inoue Kazuki (井上一樹) (2), Araki Masahiro (荒木雅博) (1); Attendance: 12,633

November 10 18:00 Tokyo Dome (Game 6) (F/7)
Team	1	2	3	4	5	6	7	8	9	R	H	E
Uni-President Lions	0	0	0	0	1	0	0	-	-	1	6	1
SK Wyverns	2	6	3	2	0	0	X	-	-	13	12	0
WP: Chei Byung Yong (채병용) (1–0) LP: Peter Munro (0–1); Home runs: Uni-President: Yang Sung-hsien (楊松弦) (1); SK: Park Kyung Oan (박경완) (1); Attendance: 7,290

== Championship ==
November 11 18:00 at Tokyo Dome (Game 7)
Team	1	2	3	4	5	6	7	8	9	R	H	E
Chunichi Dragons	0	1	0	0	2	2	0	0	1	6	7	1
SK Wyverns	2	0	0	0	0	1	0	2	0	5	8	1
WP: Yoshihiro Suzuki (鈴木義廣) (1–0) LP: Michael Desport Romano (1–1) Sv: Hitoki Iwase (岩瀬仁紀) (2); Home runs: Chunichi: Inoue Kazuki (井上一樹) (3), Lee Byung-Kyu (이병규) (1); SK: Kim Jae-Hyun (김재현) (1), Lee Jin-Young (이진영) (1); Attendance: 21,091

== See also ==
- Japan Series
- Korea Series
- Taiwan Series
- World Series
