= Asia Series =

International club baseball competition

- Most recent season or competition: 2013 Asia Series
- Formerly: Konami Cup
- Sport: Baseball
- First season: 2005
- No. of teams: 6
- Country: Australia (2011–2013); China (2005–2008, 2012); Europe (2013); Japan; South Korea; Taiwan
- Most titles: (Australia) Canberra Cavalry (Japan) Chiba Lotte Marines (Japan) Chunichi Dragons (Japan) Hokkaido Nippon Ham Fighters (Japan) Saitama Seibu Lions (South Korea) Samsung Lions (Japan) Yomiuri Giants (1 each)
- Related competitions: (Australia) ABL (China) CBL (Taiwan) CPBL (Europe) CEB European Cup (CEB) (South Korea) KBO League (KBO) (Japan) NPB

The Asia Series was an international club baseball competition, contested by the champions of all four professional leagues associated with the World Baseball Softball Confederation (WBSC)—Australian Baseball League (ABL), Chinese Professional Baseball League (CPBL), Korea Baseball Organization League (KBO League), and Nippon Professional Baseball (NPB)—along with the CEB European Champion Cup holder and host city, to bring the number of teams to six.

The competition was co-sponsored by NPB Association and Konami from 2005 to 2007 and known as the Konami Cup. Participation was limited to the East Asian countries (Japan, South Korea, Taiwan, and China). The tournament was stopped between 2009 and 2010 due to financing issues. It was reintroduced in 2011 and has been hosted by Taiwan and South Korea, whereas the previous had been held in Japan.

Following the 2013 edition, the Asia Series was discontinued due to scheduling issues. And another similar tournament Asia Professional Baseball Championship are held to replace the Asia Series.

== Background ==
The Asia Series began in 2005 as a tournament among the champions of NPB, KBO League and CPBL and an All-Star team from China Baseball League (CBL), which was called China Stars. Konami co-sponsored the competition until 2007, when the 2008 season became the first Asia Series. Additionally, it was the first time that the champion of CBL was appointed for the tournament, instead of an All-Star line-up.

The withdrawal of Konami raised in the following years financing issues. The 2009 season was reduced to a single-game championship between the champions of NPB and KBO League and held at the Nagasaki Stadium. The Yomiuri Giants won against the Kia Tigers by 9–4.

A potential 2010 season was then cancelled due to a conflict with the 2010 Asian Games and replaced by another sets of Club Championship. The KBO League champion SK Wyverns first split the two-game championship with CPBL champion Brother Elephants at the Taichung Stadium, before being defeated in a single-game championship by the NPB champion Chiba Lotte Marines at the Tokyo Dome with 3–0.

The subject of re-introducing the event for 2011 was discussed in a November 2010 meeting between the heads of the NPB, KBO, CPBL, and ABL. The CPBL offered to host the event in November 2011. The ABL, whose season runs from November through February, added a bye week in its schedule to allow the champion of the season before to participate in the Asia Series.

In 2013, Fortitudo Baseball Bologna of the Italian Baseball League competed as the first representative of Europe to participate in the tournament, qualifying as the 2013 CEB European Cup champion. Due to the CBL's hiatus that year, the tournament remained at six teams.

The 2014 and 2015 seasons were cancelled due to scheduling issues.

== Format ==
Each of the teams participated in a round-robin series, playing each other team once. The two teams with the best win-loss percentage faced each other in the final, with the team finishing higher considered the "home team", meaning that they had the advantage of batting last. If teams were tied a series of tiebreakers were used to decide which teams qualified for the final and in what order, firstly using the head-to-head win–loss records amongst tied teams, and if necessary the ranking based on the lowest team run average. All games have the designated hitter rule in effect, though not all participating teams would have it in their regular league.

== Participants ==
| Country | 2005 | 2006 | 2007 | 2008 | 2011 | 2012 | 2013 |
|---|---|---|---|---|---|---|---|
| Japan (NPB) | Yes | Yes | Yes | Yes | Yes | Yes | Yes |
| South Korea (KBO) | Yes | Yes | Yes | Yes | Yes | Yes | Yes |
| Taiwan (CPBL) | Yes | Yes | Yes | Yes | Yes | Yes | Yes |
| China (CBL) | Yes | Yes | Yes | Yes | | Yes | |
| Australia (ABL) | | | | | Yes | Yes | Yes |
| Europe (CEB) | | | | | | | Yes |

== Finals results ==
=== Konami Cup ===
2005–2007

| Season | Host city | Champions | Score | Runners-up | MVP | No. of teams |
| 2005; Details | (Japan); Tokyo | (Japan); Chiba Lotte Marines | 5–3 | (South Korea); Samsung Lions | (Philippines) Benny Agbayani; Chiba Lotte Marines | 4 |
| 2006; Details | (Japan); Tokyo | (Japan); Hokkaido Nippon-Ham Fighters | 1–0 | (Taiwan); La New Bears | (Japan) Yu Darvish; Hok. Nippon-Ham Fighters | 4 |
| 2007; Details | (Japan); Tokyo | (Japan); Chunichi Dragons | 6–5 | (South Korea); SK Wyverns | (Japan) Hirokazu Ibata; Chunichi Dragons | 4 |

=== Asia Series ===
2008, 2011–2013

| Season | Host city | Champions | Score | Runners-up | MVP | No. of teams |
| 2008; Details | (Japan); Tokyo | (Japan); Saitama Seibu Lions | 1–0 | (Taiwan); Uni-President 7-Eleven Lions | (Japan) Tomoaki Satoh; Saitama Seibu Lions | 4 |
| 2011; Details | (Taiwan); Taichung | (South Korea); Samsung Lions | 5–3 | (Japan); Fukuoka SoftBank Hawks | (South Korea) Won-Sam Jang; Samsung Lions | 4 |
| 2012; Details | (South Korea); Busan | (Japan); Yomiuri Giants | 6–3 | (Taiwan); Lamigo Monkeys | (Japan) Hayato Sakamoto; Yomiuri Giants | 6 |
| 2013; Details | (Taiwan); Taichung | (Australia); Canberra Cavalry | 14–4 | (Taiwan); Uni-President 7-Eleven Lions | (United States) Jack Murphy; Canberra Cavalry | 6 |

== Series records ==
=== By country ===
| Country | Champions | Runners-up | Years won | Years finalist |
|---|---|---|---|---|
| Japan (NPB) | 5 | 1 | 2005, 2006, 2007, 2008, 2012 | 2011 |
| South Korea (KBO) | 1 | 2 | 2011 | 2005, 2007 |
| Australia (ABL) | 1 | 0 | 2013 | |
| Taiwan (CPBL) | 0 | 4 | | 2006, 2008, 2012, 2013 |

=== By club ===
| Club | Champions | Runners-up | Participated | Years won | Years finalist | Games won | Games lost | Games pct. |
|---|---|---|---|---|---|---|---|---|
| (South Korea) Samsung Lions | 1 | 1 | 5 | 2011 | 2005 | 9 | 7 | .563 |
| (Japan) Chiba Lotte Marines | 1 | 0 | 1 | 2005 | | 4 | 0 | 1.000 |
| (Japan) Hokkaido Nippon-Ham Fighters | 1 | 0 | 1 | 2006 | | 4 | 0 | 1.000 |
| (Japan) Yomiuri Giants | 1 | 0 | 1 | 2012 | | 3 | 0 | 1.000 |
| (Japan) Chunichi Dragons | 1 | 0 | 1 | 2007 | | 3 | 1 | .750 |
| (Japan) Saitama Seibu Lions | 1 | 0 | 1 | 2008 | | 3 | 1 | .750 |
| (Australia) Canberra Cavalry | 1 | 0 | 1 | 2013 | | 3 | 1 | .750 |
| (Taiwan) Lamigo Monkeys^{1} | 0 | 2 | 2 | | 2006, 2012 | 4 | 3 | .571 |
| (Taiwan) Uni-President 7-Eleven Lions | 0 | 2 | 4 | | 2008, 2013 | 6 | 8 | .429 |
| (Japan) Fukuoka SoftBank Hawks | 0 | 1 | 1 | | 2011 | 3 | 1 | .750 |
| (South Korea) SK Wyverns | 0 | 1 | 2 | | 2007 | 5 | 2 | .714 |
| (Japan) Tohoku Rakuten Golden Eagles | 0 | 0 | 1 | | | 2 | 1 | .667 |
| (South Korea) Lotte Giants | 0 | 0 | 1 | | | 1 | 1 | .500 |
| (Taiwan) EDA Rhinos^{2} | 0 | 0 | 2 | | | 1 | 4 | .200 |
| China Stars | 0 | 0 | 4 | | | 0 | 11 | .000 |
| (Australia) Perth Heat | 0 | 0 | 2 | | | 0 | 5 | .000 |
| (Italy) Fortitudo Baseball Bologna | 0 | 0 | 1 | | | 0 | 2 | .000 |
| (China) Tianjin Lions | 0 | 0 | 1 | | | 0 | 3 | .000 |

- ^{1}: Participated in 2006 under its old name La New Bears
- ^{2}: Participated in 2005 under its old name Sinon Bulls

== See also ==
- Asia Professional Baseball Championship
- Asia Winter Baseball League
- MLB Japan All-Star Series
- WBSC Premier12
- Caribbean Series
- Latin American Series
- European Cup
- World Baseball Classic
- Baseball awards § Asia
