= List of Nippon Professional Baseball players (V) =

The following is a list of Nippon Professional Baseball players with the last name starting with V, retired or active.

== V ==
Name	Debut	Final game	Position	Teams	Ref
Marc Valdes			Pitcher	Hanshin Tigers, Chunichi Dragons	
Pedro Valdés			Outfielder	Fukuoka Daiei Hawks	
Carlos Valdez			Pitcher	Osaka Kintetsu Buffaloes	
Mario Valdez			Outfielder	Osaka Kintetsu Buffaloes	
Wilson Valdez			Infielder	Tokyo Yakult Swallows	
Eric Valent			Outfielder	Tohoku Rakuten Golden Eagles	
Bobby Valentine			Manager	Chiba Lotte Marines	
Joe Valentine			Pitcher	Chunichi Dragons	
Martin Vargas			Pitcher	Chunichi Dragons	
Marte Victor			Pitcher	Hiroshima Toyo Carp	
Joe Vitiello			Infielder	Orix BlueWave	
Ryan Vogelsong			Pitcher	Hanshin Tigers	
Brad Voyles			Pitcher	Fukuoka Daiei Hawks	
