= Luo Xia =

Chinese baseball pitcher

Sichuan Dragons
- Pitcher
- Born: July 14, 1992 (age 33); China
- Bats: Right Throws: Right

Luo Xia (born July 14, 1992) is a Chinese baseball pitcher who plays with the Sichuan Dragons in the China Baseball League.

Li represented China at the 2012 Asia Series, 2012 Asian Baseball Championship, 2013 East Asian Games, 2013 World Baseball Classic, 2014 Asian Games, 2015 Asian Baseball Championship, and 2017 World Baseball Classic.
