= 2008 China Baseball League season =

The 2008 China Baseball League season involves for the first time the champion of the league going to the Asia Series, instead of the all-star China Stars that were sent in previous years. For the first time in the history of the CBL, the season has been split into 2 sections. This is to accommodate the Beijing Olympics. The first half runs from April 11 to May 11, and then the season will resume on September 5 and conclude on October 12.

== Standings ==
=== Southeast Division ===
As of May 11

Southeast Division	W	L	Home	Away	Total Score
Tianjin Lions	14	1	12-0	2-1	138
Beijing Tigers	9	6	0-0	9-6	104
Sichuan Dragons	6	9	2-4	4-5	85

=== Southwest Division ===
As of May 11

Southwest Division	W	L	Home	Away	Total Score
Shanghai Golden Eagles	8	7	5-4	3-3	64
Guangdong Leopards	4	11	1-5	3-6	81
Jiangsu Hopestars	4	11	3-9	1-2	59
