= Orlando Román =

Puerto Rican baseball player (born 1978)

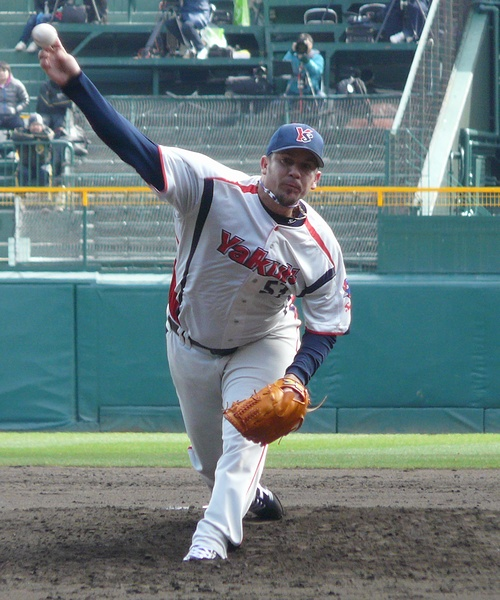
- Román with the Tokyo Yakult Swallows
- Pitcher / Coach
- Born: November 28, 1978 (age 47); Bayamón, Puerto Rico
- Batted: Right Threw: Right

CPBL debut
- March 24, 2010, for the Brother Elephants

Last CPBL appearance
- September 21, 2017, for the Chinatrust Brothers

CPBL statistics
- Win–loss record: 44–28
- Earned run average: 3.78
- Strikeouts: 564

NPB statistics
- Win–loss record: 18–22
- Earned run average: 3.00
- Strikeouts: 207
- Stats at Baseball Reference

Teams
- Brother Elephants (2010–2011); Tokyo Yakult Swallows (2012–2015); Lamigo Monkeys (2016); Chinatrust Brothers (2017)

Career highlights and awards
- Taiwan Series champion (2010)
Medals
Men's baseball
Representing Puerto Rico
World Baseball Classic
Silver medal – second place	2013 San Francisco	Team
Silver medal – second place	2017 Los Angeles	Team
Pan American Games
Gold medal – first place	2019 Lima	Team

Orlando Bruno Román (born November 28, 1978) is a Puerto Rican former professional baseball pitcher. He has played in the Chinese Professional Baseball League (CPBL) for the Brother Elephants in 2010 and 2011, the Lamigo Monkeys in 2016, and the Chinatrust Brothers in 2017, and in Nippon Professional Baseball for the Tokyo Yakult Swallows from 2012 to 2015. He currently serves as the pitching coach for the Fubon Guardians of the CPBL.

== Career ==
Román attended Indian Hills Community College and was drafted by the New York Mets in the 31st round (946th overall) of the 1999 Major League Baseball draft. He played in the Mets' minor league organization through 2006, reaching Triple-A. He pitched in the minor league systems of the Baltimore Orioles in 2007 and the Toronto Blue Jays in 2008. Román also pitched for the Pericos de Puebla of the Mexican League in 2007, 2008 and 2009. Román was a mid-season all-star in 2008 and 2009. In 2010, Román signed with the Brother Elephants of the Chinese Professional Baseball League and played for the team in 2011 as well. On January 14, 2012, Román signed with the Tokyo Yakult Swallows of Nippon Professional Baseball. In 4 seasons with the Swallows, Román pitched to an 18–22 record with a 3.00 ERA and 207 strikeouts in 324.0 innings pitched over 133 total games. Román became a free agent after the 2015 season. Román signed with the Lamigo Monkeys of the Chinese Professional Baseball League for the 2016 season. On April 1, 2017, Román signed with the Chinatrust Brothers of the Chinese Professional Baseball League.

== International career ==
Román has appeared in the four editions of the World Baseball Classic (2006, 2009, 2013, 2017) for team Puerto Rico. At the 2017 World Baseball Classic, he was the starting pitcher against Dominican Republic in the second round.

== Coaching career ==
On June 24, 2022, Roman was hired to serve as the pitching coach for the Fubon Guardians of the Chinese Professional Baseball League (CPBL).

== Personal life ==
On May 29, 2019, Román and former professional baseball player Ángel Pagán were rescued at sea off the coast of Puerto Rico after a 15-foot wave caused their boat to capsize.
