= 2006 CPBL playoffs =

Baseball playoffs in Taiwan

The Chinese Professional Baseball League (CPBL) playoffs included the three top teams from the regular season and crowned a champion with the Taiwan Series through the month of October, 2006. The winner represented Taiwan in the Konami Cup in Japan with the champions from Japan, South Korea, and an all-star team from China to determine an Asian champion in November.

== Participants ==
- La New Bears (#1 seed): The Bears won the number one seed by being the regular season champion for both halves of the season, thus securing the best overall record as well. This is the first time ever in the playoff for the Bears and, as the top seed, secure automatic entry into the Taiwan Series.
- Uni-President Lions (#2 Seed): The Lions are returning to the playoffs after missing out last year. They are the second seed based on their having the second best overall record through the whole season. They lost the Taiwan series to the Bulls in 2004.
- Sinon Bulls (#3 seed): The Bulls are entering the playoffs for the fourth consecutive year and are the number three seed based on having the third best overall record through the season. Sinon is the two-time defending Taiwan Series champion, and also made an appearance in the Taiwan Series in 2003.

== First round ==
In the First Round of competition, the Uni-President Lions defeated the Sinon Bulls in 3 games to 0.

=== Game 1, October 13 ===
Tainan Municipal Baseball Stadium, Tainan City

Team	1	2	3	4	5	6	7	8	9	R	H	E
Sinon Bulls	0	1	0	2	0	1	0	0	0	4	10	0
Uni-President Lions	1	3	0	2	0	0	2	0	0	8	12	0

WP: Jeriome Robertson (1–0) LP: Alfredo Gonzalez(0–1)
HRs: Sinon - Hsu Kuo-lung (許國隆) (1), Chang Tai-shan (張泰山) (1) (2); Uni-President - Pan Wu-hsiung (潘武雄) (1), Tilson Brito (1)
Attendance: 2,430

=== Game 2, October 14 ===
Tainan Municipal Baseball Stadium, Tainan City

Team	1	2	3	4	5	6	7	8	9	R	H	E
Sinon Bulls	0	0	0	0	0	0	0	0	0	0	5	1
Uni-President Lions	0	0	0	0	0	0	0	0	1	1	5	1

WP: Pan Wei-lun (潘威倫) (1–0) LP: Kuo Yung-chih (郭勇志) (0–1)
Attendance: 4,755

=== Game 3, October 14 ===
Tainan Municipal Baseball Stadium, Tainan City

Team	1	2	3	4	5	6	7	8	9	R	H	E
Sinon Bulls	0	0	0	0	0	0	0	0	0	0	6	0
Uni-President Lions	2	0	0	0	2	0	2	0	X	6	11	1

WP: Hansel Izquierdo (1–0) LP: Billy Sylvester (0–1)
HRs: Uni-President - Chen Chia-wei (陳家偉) (1)
Attendance: 5,392

== Taiwan Series ==
The Taiwan Series was played between the La New Bears and the Uni-President Lions.

=== Game 1 ===
October 21 @ Kaohsiung La New Bears 4 Uni-President Lions 3 (11 innings)

Team	1	2	3	4	5	6	7	8	9	10	11	R	H	E
Uni-President Lions	0	1	2	0	0	0	0	0	0	0	0	3	11	0
La New Bears	1	0	0	0	2	0	0	0	0	0	1	4	10	0

Winning Pitcher: Hsu Chih-hwa 許 志 華(1-0) Losing Pitcher: Tseng Yuh-cheng 曾 翊 誠(0-1)
HR (Lions): Tilson Brito 布雷(2)
HR (Bears): Huang Lung-yih 黃龍義 (1)
Apparent Tilson Brito 布雷(Lions) two-run home run in the top of the fifth inning ruled a foul ball.
Lions failed to score with runners on second and third with no outs in the top of the seventh.
Lions Kao Kuo-ching 高國慶 was thrown out at the plate in the top of the tenth.
Bears Shih Chih-wei 石志偉 had a game-winning single with the bases loaded with no outs in the bottom of the eleventh inning.
Attendance - 11,339

=== Game 2 ===
October 22 @ Douliou - La New Bears 6 Uni-President Lions 5

Team	1	2	3	4	5	6	7	8	9	R	H	E
Uni-President Lions	1	1	2	0	0	0	0	1	0	5	12	0
La New Bears	0	2	0	0	0	1	0	2	1	6	14	0

Winning Pitcher: Ramon Morel 魔銳(1-0) Losing Pitcher: Lin Yueh-pin 林 岳 平(0-1)
HR: None
Bears won the game in the bottom of the ninth inning with a walk-off base hit by Chen Fong-ming 陳 峰 民
Attendance: 7,606

=== Game 3 ===
October 24 @ Sinjhuang La New Bears 5 Uni-President Lions 2

Team	1	2	3	4	5	6	7	8	9	R	H	E
Uni-President Lions	0	0	0	1	0	0	0	1	0	2	7	3
La New Bears	2	3	0	0	0	0	0	0	X	5	9	1

Winning Pitcher: Tsai Ing-fong 蔡 英 峰 (1-0) Losing Pitcher: Hansel Izquierdo 韓森 (1-1)
Save Ramon Morel 魔銳 (1)
HR (Bears):Lin Chih-sheng (林 智 勝)
Lions had the bases loaded in the top of the eighth with no outs, and only managed one run.
Attendance: 12,000

=== Game 4 ===
October 25 @ Tainan La New Bears 7 Uni-President Lions 3

Team	1	2	3	4	5	6	7	8	9	R	H	E
La New Bears	0	0	0	0	1	2	0	0	4	7	10	1
Uni-President Lions	1	0	0	2	0	0	0	0	0	3	5	2

Winning Pitcher: Anthony Fiore 飛銳 (1-0) - Losing Pitcher: Lin Yueh-pin 林 岳 平 (0-2)
Home Runs (Bears): Chen Chin-fong 陳 金 鋒 (1)
Attendance: 8037
Bears won three of the four games in the final inning of the game.

La New Bears win series 4 games to 0 for their first ever CPBL/Taiwan Series championship and advance to the 2006 Konami Cup Asia Series.
