= Benny Agbayani =

American baseball player (born 1971)

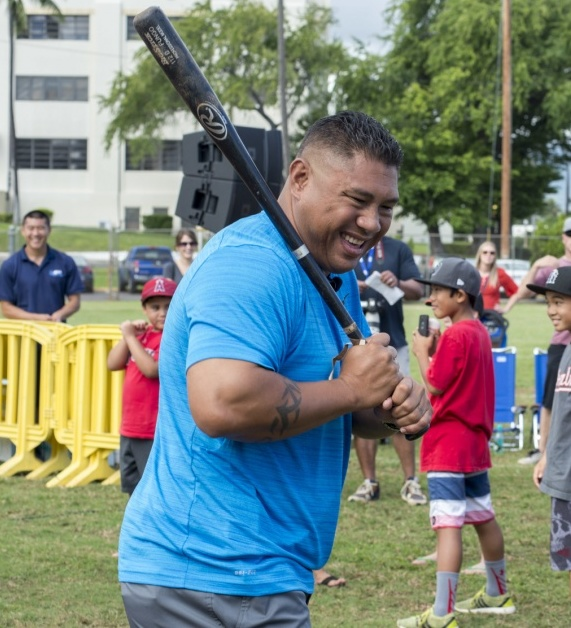
- Agbayani at Pearl Harbor in 2015
- Left fielder
- Born: December 28, 1971 (age 54); Honolulu, Hawaii, U.S.
- Batted: Right Threw: Right

Professional debut
- MLB: June 17, 1998, for the New York Mets
- NPB: March 27, 2004, for the Chiba Lotte Marines

Last appearance
- MLB: September 29, 2002, for the Boston Red Sox
- NPB: September 27, 2009, for the Chiba Lotte Marines

MLB statistics
- Batting average: .274
- Home runs: 39
- Runs batted in: 156

NPB statistics
- Batting average: .283
- Home runs: 90
- Runs batted in: 360
- Stats at Baseball Reference

Teams
- New York Mets (1998–2001); Colorado Rockies (2002); Boston Red Sox (2002); Chiba Lotte Marines (2004–2009)

Benny Peter Agbayani, Jr. (/æɡbaɪˈɑːni/; born December 28, 1971) is an American former professional baseball player. He played in Major League Baseball (MLB) for the New York Mets, Colorado Rockies, and Boston Red Sox, and in Nippon Professional Baseball (NPB) for the Chiba Lotte Marines.

== Career ==
=== Minor leagues ===
He was originally drafted by the California Angels in the 25th round of the 1992 amateur draft but did not sign. Agbayani was later drafted in the 30th round by the New York Mets on June 3, 1993. He became a local star at the Triple-A minor league team, the Norfolk Tides.

As a minor league player in the spring of 1995, Agbayani was on a 40-man MLB roster as a replacement player during the 1994–95 Major League Baseball strike. For this reason, he is not allowed union membership.

=== New York Mets ===
Agbayani made his major league debut with the New York Mets on June 17, 1998, as part of an 8th-inning double-switch in which he defensively replaced center fielder Butch Huskey during a 5–4 loss to the Montreal Expos. He made his first start and picked up his first big league hit on June 19. Agbayani led off the bottom of the first inning by singling to second base off Florida Marlins pitcher Brian Meadows.

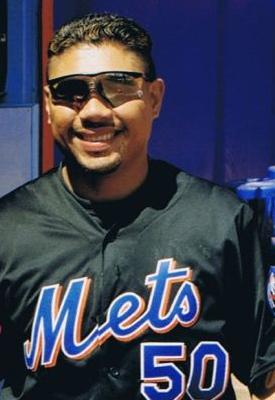
Agbayani at Shea Stadium

His 11 home runs prior to the All Star break in 1999 was the second-most by a Mets rookie, behind Ron Swoboda (15, in 1965); Ike Davis also had 11 in 2010. Swoboda's record was subsequently broken by Pete Alonso, with 30 homers by the break in 2019.

On August 12, 2000, while a member of the Mets, Agbayani was involved in a particularly memorable play. In the fourth inning, with the Mets leading 1–0, the Giants loaded the bases after a double, an error, and a hit batsman. With one out, Giants catcher Bobby Estalella hit a fly pop to Agbayani in left field. Agbayani, thinking that the catch made three outs, gave the ball to a child, Jake Burns, in the stands and began to trot toward the dugout. Upon realizing his mistake, Agbayani sprinted back to the stands, pulled the ball from the hands of Burns, and fired a throw toward home plate. Unfortunately for Agbayani, once the ball left the field, the play was dead, and all three runners were awarded two bases—causing Jeff Kent and Ellis Burks to score, and the Giants to take the lead, 2–1. The Mets came back to win the game, 3–2, and Agbayani gave another ball to the boy.

Agbayani is also fondly remembered by Mets fans for two clutch home runs hit during the 2000 season, earning him the nickname "Hawaiian Punch" (after the popular fruit drink). On March 30, his 11th inning grand slam against the Chicago Cubs gave the Mets their first win of the season, and a split in the two-game series the Mets and Cubs played in Tokyo, Japan. (It remained the only regular-season MLB grand slam ever hit in Japan until Domingo Santana hit one for the Seattle Mariners vs the Oakland Athletics on March 20, 2019.) Later that year, on October 7, he hit a game-winning home run in the 13th inning of Game 3 of the National League Division Series against Aaron Fultz of the Giants. Agbayani also drove in the winning run in the only game the Mets won in the 2000 World Series.

=== Colorado Rockies ===
On January 21, 2002, Agbayani was part of a 10-player, three-team trade between the Mets, Rockies and Milwaukee Brewers, that sent him from New York to Colorado. He struggled in 48 games with the Rockies, hitting .205 with four home runs and 19 RBI before he was placed on waivers in late August.

=== Boston Red Sox ===
The Boston Red Sox selected Agbayani off waivers from the Rockies on August 26, 2002, as the club made a drive for the playoffs. He played relatively well down the stretch, hitting .297 and driving in eight runs in 37 at-bats over 13 games with Boston. In his final MLB game, Agbayani went 1-for-4 with a walk and a strikeout as the Red Sox defeated the Tampa Bay Devil Rays at Fenway Park on September 29.

=== Nippon Professional Baseball ===
In October 2005, Agbayani and the Chiba Lotte Marines swept the Hanshin Tigers in 4 games during the Japan Series. This was the Marines' first title in 31 years. On November 13, 2005, they won the inaugural Asia Series after defeating the champions of South Korea, China, and Taiwan. They defeated the Samsung Lions in the championship and Agbayani was named MVP of the series. Agbayani's manager with Chiba Lotte was his manager with the Mets, Bobby Valentine. He retired following the 2009 season, his sixth in Japan.

== Personal life ==
Agbayani is of Filipino, Samoan, and Hawaiian descent. He attended Saint Louis School, Hawaii Pacific University and the Oregon Institute of Technology (Oregon Tech).

Agbayani and his wife Niela have three children; daughters Aleia and Ailana, and son Bruin. Aleia attended UC Berkeley where she played for their softball team from 2020 to 2023. After graduating from Cal in the spring of 2023, she pursued a master's degree in public health at Brigham Young University, and played softball, in the 2024 season. Ailana also attended Brigham Young University, and also played softball, that same season. Ailana transferred to the University of Oklahoma for the 2025 season. Ailana currently plays as a professional softball infielder for the Chicago Bandits in the AUSL Bruin also attended Saint Louis School and now plays professional baseball.

Following his retirement from baseball, Benny Agbayani was hired as an educational assistant at Mililani High School in Oahu in 2010.

As of December 2019, Agbayani was a ramp agent for Hawaiian Airlines. He was also the softball head coach at ʻIolani School in Honolulu, where both of his daughters attended and played softball.

== Career and achievements ==
- He is a 1989 inductee of Hawaii High School Athletic Association Hall Of Honor. His daughter Ailana, whom he coached in softball, is a 2022 inductee.
- Despite having only limited and occasional success in the major leagues, Agbayani was a popular figure with fans, particular in New York, where his successes were often met with "Benny, Benny!" chants as well as "Benny and the Mets", a parody of Elton John's "Bennie and the Jets".

== See also ==
- List of Filipino American Baseball players
