= Martin Vargas (baseball) =

Dominican baseball player

- Pitcher
- Born: February 22, 1978 (age 48); San Pedro de Macorís, Dominican Republic
- Bats: Right Throws: Right

Professional debut
- NPB: 2002, for the Chunichi Dragons
- KBO: 2005, for the Samsung Lions

NPB statistics (through 2004)
- Win–loss record: 4-9
- Earned run average: 4.26
- Strikeouts: 78

KBO statistics (through 2005)
- Win–loss record: 10-8
- Earned run average: 5.06
- Strikeouts: 66
- Stats at Baseball Reference

Teams
- Chunichi Dragons (2002–2004); Samsung Lions (2005); La New Bears (2006)

Martin Vargas (born February 22, 1978) is a Dominican former professional baseball pitcher. He played primarily in the minor leagues of the United States.

He later played in the Japanese Central League for Chunichi Dragons (2002–2005), and the Korea Baseball Organization for the Samsung Lions in 2005. Playing for the Lions, he was the losing pitcher in Game 2 of the 2005 Asia Series, as the Lions fell to the Chiba Lotte Marines 6-2.

Martin later played for the Potros de Tijuana in the Mexican League. Later he played in the Dominican Winter League with Estrellas de Oriente (2006–2007), Tigres del Licey (2008–2009), and Leones del Escogido (2012–2013). He even played for the Italian Baseball League (in 2008).
