= Chinese Baseball Association =

Governing body of baseball in China

- Abbreviation: CBA
- Formation: 1979
- Type: Sport governing body
- Headquarters: Beijing, China
- Website: http://baseball.sport.org.cn/

The Chinese Baseball Association (CBA; Chinese: 中国棒球协会; pinyin: Zhōngguó Bàngqiú Xiéhuì) is a national sports organization representing China in the World Baseball Softball Confederation (WBSC) and the Baseball Federation of Asia. Founded in 1979, the CBA is headquartered in Beijing and is responsible for the development and promotion of baseball in China. The CBA organizes and oversees the national baseball leagues and teams, including Chinese Professional Baseball (CPB), the China Baseball League (CBL) and the China National Baseball League (CNBL). It also selects and trains the national baseball team, which competes in international tournaments. The CBA has its headquarters in Beijing and is led by a National Council. The CBA also has special committees for coaches, judges, scientific research, and news.

== History ==
The Chinese Baseball Association (CBA) was founded in 1979 and joined the International Baseball Federation in 1981 and the Baseball Federation of Asia in 1985.

In 2001, the CBA began promoting the professionalization of baseball in China and encouraged the establishment of professional baseball clubs.

The CBA announced the formation of a new national professional baseball league, Chinese Professional Baseball (CPB), in September 2025. The CPB began play January 2026, initially consisting of five teams from Changsha, Shanghai, Shenzhen, Xiamen, and Fuzhou.

== See also ==
- China Baseball League
- China national baseball team
- Baseball awards#China (People's Republic of China)
