= Hirokazu Ibata =

Japanese baseball player (born 1975)

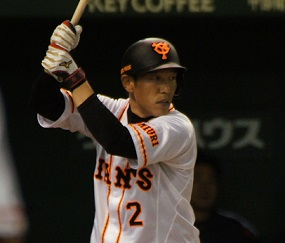
- Ibata with the Yomiuri Giants in 2014

Japan national baseball team – No. 89
- Infielder / Manager
- Born: May 12, 1975 (age 50); Kawasaki, Kanagawa, Japan
- Batted: Right Threw: Right

NPB debut
- September 8, 1998, for the Chunichi Dragons

Last NPB appearance
- October 29, 2015, for the Yomiuri Giants

NPB statistics
- Games: 1896
- Batting average: .281
- Hits: 1,912
- Home runs: 56
- Runs batted in: 510
- Stats at Baseball Reference

Teams
- As player: Chunichi Dragons (1998–2013); Yomiuri Giants (2014–2015); As manager: Japan national baseball team (2023–2026); As coach: Yomiuri Giants (2016–2018); Japan national baseball team (2019–2023)

Career highlights and awards
- NPB: 8× All-Star (2001, 2002, 2005, 2007–2010, 2011); 7× Golden Glove Award (2004–2009, 2012); 5× Best Nine Award (2002, 2004–2007); Asia Series MVP (2007); Japan Series champion (2007); International: All-World Baseball Classic Team (2013)

Hirokazu Ibata (Japanese:井端 弘和, born May 12, 1975) is a Japanese professional baseball coach and former player in Nippon Professional Baseball (NPB). He was most recently the manager of the Japanese national baseball team, having stepped down from his position following Japan's elimination from the 2026 World Baseball Classic.

== Baseball career ==
Ibata played second base for the Yomiuri Giants and short stop for the Chunichi Dragons but is able to play at other positions.

After retiring at the end of the 2015 season, Ibata took up new Giants' manager, Yoshinobu Takahashi's invitation to join his coaching staff.
