= Marcelo Martinez =

Mexican baseball player (born 1996)

Marcelo Martínez

Wei Chuan Dragons – No. 10
- Pitcher
- Born: August 10, 1996 (age 30); Reynosa, Mexico
- Bats: Left Throws: Left

CPBL debut
- April 19, 2024, for the Rakuten Monkeys

CPBL statistics (through 2025 season)
- Win–loss record: 26–11
- Earned run average: 2.28
- Strikeouts: 212
- Stats at Baseball Reference

Teams
- Rakuten Monkeys (2024–2025); Wei Chuan Dragons (2026-present)

Career highlights and awards
- Taiwan Series champion (2025)

Marcelo Martínez (born August 10, 1996) is a Mexican professional baseball pitcher for the Wei Chuan Dragons of the Chinese Professional Baseball League (CPBL). He has previously played in the CPBL for the Rakuten Monkeys.

== Career ==
=== Sultanes de Monterrey ===
On June 7, 2017, Martinez signed with the Sultanes de Monterrey of the Mexican League. In 4 appearances for Monterrey, Martinez recorded a 3.00 ERA with 3 strikeouts across 3 innings of work.

=== Kansas City Royals ===
On March 7, 2018, Martinez signed a minor league contract with the Kansas City Royals. In 13 games (11 starts) split between the rookie-level Idaho Falls Chukars, rookie-level Burlington Royals, and Single-A Lexington Legends, he accumulated an aggregate 6–4 record and 2.74 ERA with 90 strikeouts across 69 innings pitched.

Martinez spent the 2019 season split between Lexington and the High-A Wilmington Blue Rocks. In 27 appearances (21 starts) split between the two affiliates, he compiled a combined 6–7 record and 4.07 ERA with 118 strikeouts and 2 saves across 130 1/3 innings pitched. Martinez did not play in a game in 2020 due to the cancellation of the minor league season because of the COVID-19 pandemic.

Martinez returned to action in 2021 with the Double-A Northwest Arkansas Naturals and Triple-A Omaha Storm Chasers. In 25 games (24 starts) for the two affiliates, he registered a cumulative 6–9 record and 5.11 ERA with 117 strikeouts across 112 2/3 innings pitched. Martinez returned to the two affiliates in 2022, posting an aggregate 6–6 record and 6.17 ERA with 115 strikeouts over 109 1/3 innings of work.

Martinez began the 2023 campaign with Triple-A Omaha, registering a 1–1 record and 4.29 ERA with 13 strikeouts across 9 appearances. Martinez was released by the Royals organization on June 27, 2023.

=== Sultanes de Monterrey (second stint) ===
On July 13, 2023, Martinez signed with the Sultanes de Monterrey of the Mexican League. In 5 games (3 starts) for the Sultanes down the stretch, Martinez logged a 2–0 record and 3.06 ERA with 17 strikeouts across 17 2/3 innings pitched.

=== Rakuten Monkeys ===
On February 7, 2024, Martinez signed with the Rakuten Monkeys of the Chinese Professional Baseball League. In 24 starts for the Monkeys, he compiled a 13–3 record and 2.04 ERA with 114 strikeouts across 149 2/3 innings pitched.

On January 21, 2025, Martinez re-signed with Rakuten. In 25 starts for the team, he compiled a 13–8 record and 2.51 ERA with 98 strikeouts over 158 innings of work. With the Monkeys, Martinez won the 2025 Taiwan Series.

=== Wei Chuan Dragons ===
On January 7, 2026, Martinez signed with the Wei Chuan Dragons of the Chinese Professional Baseball League.
