= A.S.O =

Taiwanese footwear company

A.S.O Shoes
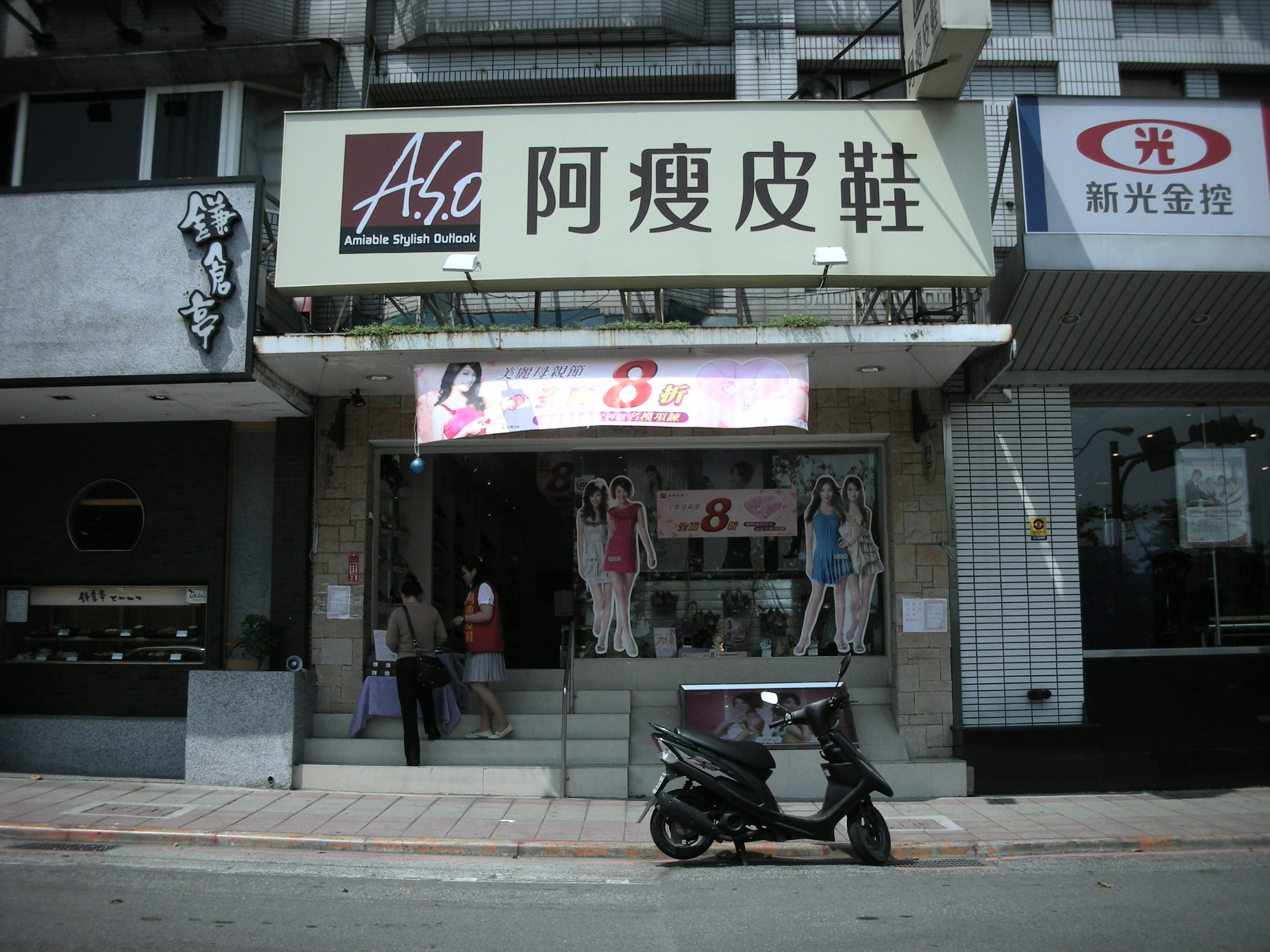
- Founded: November 5, 1952
- Founder: Lo Shui-mu
- Headquarters: Taipei, Taiwan
- Number of locations: 109 stores (2024)
- Products: Dress shoe
- Website: Official website

A.S.O Shoes (Chinese: 阿瘦實業股份有限公司), commonly known as A.S.O, is a Taiwanese footwear company specializing in dress shoes. A.S.O stands for Amiable Stylish Outlook. Founded in 1952 as a shoeshine business in Taipei by Lo Shui-mu, the company has grown into one of Taiwan’s leading shoe manufacturers. A.S.O. is known for its high-quality, comfortable leather footwear and diversified brands that cater to a wide range of customer needs. A.S.O’s headquarters are located on Level 6, No. 168, Songjian Road, Zhongshan District, Taipei City, Taiwan.

== History ==
A.S.O began as a small shoeshine stand called "A.S.O Shoeshine Service" on Yanping North Road in Taipei. Lo Shui-mu, the founder, grew up in Yilan County and moved to Taipei in his twenties to seek opportunities. After overcoming financial setbacks and health challenges, Lo expanded his business to include shoe repair and eventually began designing and manufacturing leather shoes in 1966. In 1971, A.S.O opened its first flagship store, named "A.S.O Double Horse," on Yanping North Road. The store’s name reflected Lo’s zodiac sign, the horse, which he shared with his eldest daughter. Over the years, A.S.O expanded its product range, launching sub-brands such as BESO for women's shoes and FRENO for casual footwear in 2005. Lo Shui-mu retired in 2012, passing the business to his sons, Lo Rong-yue (Joseph Lo) and Lo Rong-ke. Under their leadership, A.S.O continued to innovate and diversify its offerings, including launching a range of e-commerce platforms and lifestyle brands. In 2014, A.S.O became the first Taiwanese footwear company to go public. In 2015, A.S.O donated NT$30 million to establish the A.S.O Lo Shui-mu Memorial Library in Lo’s hometown in Yilan County.

A.S.O has made significant strides in integrating technology into footwear design. In 2018, the company collaborated with the Industrial Technology Research Institute to develop a dynamic foot pressure measurement system, which is now available in all stores. By 2021, A.S.O had further expanded into foot health services, establishing Foot Medical Centers and Foot Health Nail Centers. These facilities offer treatments for common foot and nail conditions such as ingrown nails, corns, and athlete’s foot.

== See also ==
- La New
