= La New =

Taiwanese footwear company

La New International Corporation
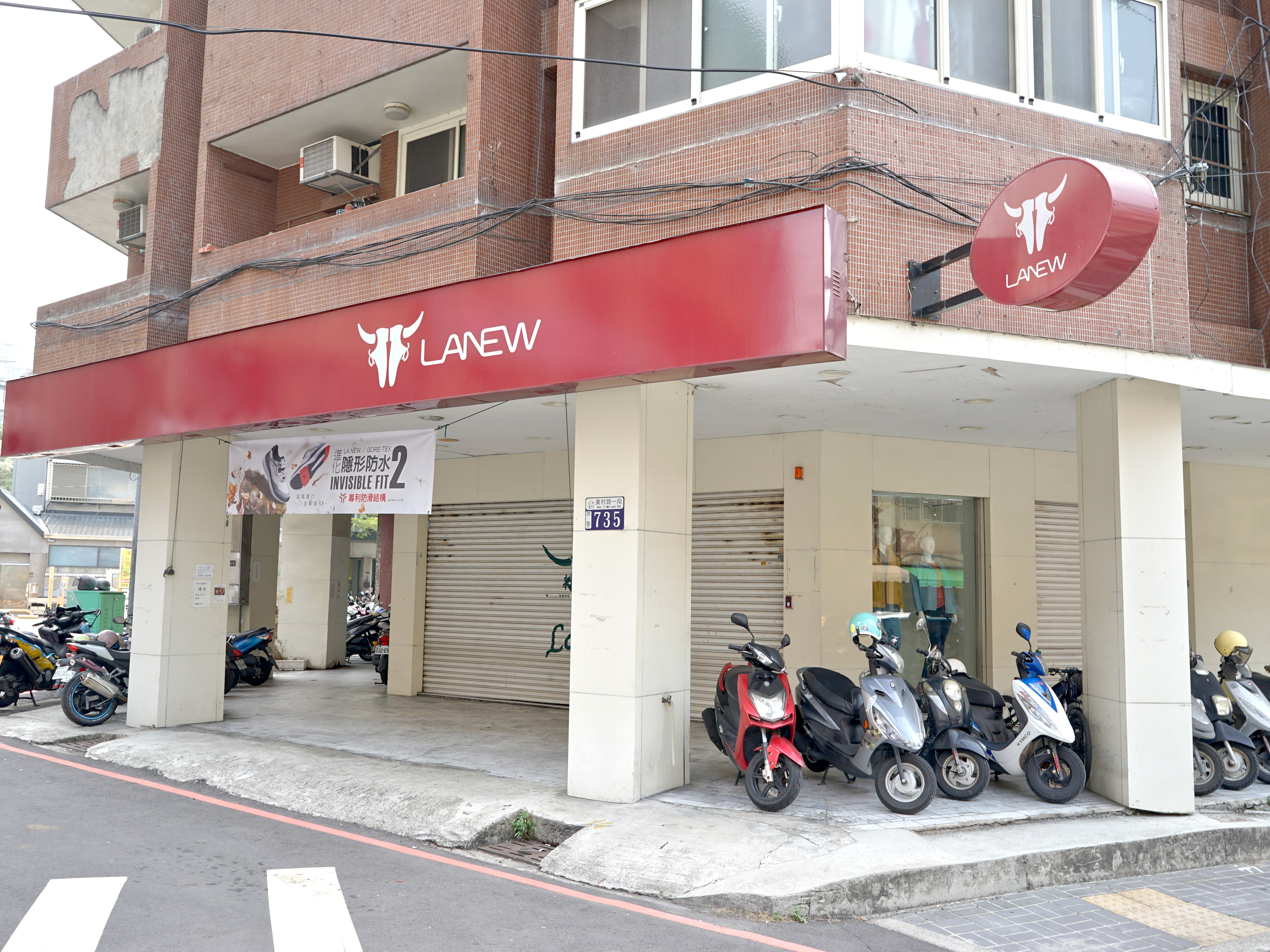
- La New, Taichung Meicun Store
- Founded: April 29, 1996
- Founder: Liu Bao-You
- Headquarters: New Taipei, Taiwan
- Number of locations: 133 stores (2024)
- Products: Casual footwear
- Website: Official website

La New International Corporation (Chinese: 老牛皮國際) is a footwear company based in New Taipei, Taiwan. Founded on 29 April 1996 by Liu Bao-You, La New had opened more than 100 retail stores nationwide by 2024. La New's headquarters are located in Xizhi District, New Taipei City, Taiwan.

== History ==
In its early years, La New utilized a consignment sales model, which later proved problematic due to widespread issues with unpaid invoices from retailers. As a result, the company shifted its strategy, retracting from third-party stores and opening its first standalone store on Minsheng East Road in Taipei. To further its brand development, La New invested heavily in research and development. In 2001, it established the La New Foot Research Institute, allocating NT$10 million annually to design shoes tailored to special foot shapes.

Despite facing economic challenges, including an underperformance of several external investments, La New's market position was strengthened through strategic partnerships. In 2006, the company gained visibility in Japan, leveraging the success of the La New Bears', now known as Rakuten Monkeys, performance in the Asia Baseball Championship, which facilitated the opening of several La New stores in Japan.

In 2009, La New expanded its business model, founding the LamiGo Group, which diversified into sectors such as travel agencies, leisure clubs, and banquet halls. La New was also known for its involvement in the Chinese Professional Baseball League (CPBL), where it operated the Lamigo Monkeys (later sold to Rakuten in 2019). This acquisition marked a significant shift in the company's focus as it moved away from professional sports investments.

== See also ==
- A.S.O
