= Jang Won-sam =

South Korean baseball player (born 1983)

- Starting pitcher
- Born: June 9, 1983 (age 42)
- Bats: Left Throws: Left

KBO debut
- April 11, 2006, for the Hyundai Unicorns

KBO statistics (through July 16, 2019)
- Win–loss record: 121–95
- Earned run average: 4.21
- Strikeouts: 1,186
- Stats at Baseball Reference

Teams
- Hyundai Unicorns (2006–2007); Woori Heroes (2008–2009); Samsung Lions (2010–2018); LG Twins (2019); Lotte Giants (2020)

Career highlights and awards
- Asia Series MVP (2011); Korean Series champion (2011); KBO Win title (2012); KBO Golden Glove (2012)
Medals
Men's baseball
Representing South Korea
Olympics
Gold medal – first place	2008 Beijing	Team
World Baseball Classic
Silver medal – second place	2009 Los Angeles	Team
Baseball World Cup
Silver medal – second place	2005 Netherlands	Team

Jang Won-sam (Korean: 장원삼; Hanja: 張洹三; born June 9, 1983 in Changwon, Gyeongsangnam-do, South Korea) is a South Korean left-handed starting pitcher who plays for the LG Twins in the KBO League.

== Amateur career ==
As a junior at Yongma High School in Masan, South Korea, Jang was selected by the Hyundai Unicorns with the 89th pick in the 2nd round (97th overall) of the 2002 KBO Draft. However, he entered Kyungsung University upon graduation from high school instead of turning pro directly.

In 2004, as a junior at Kyungsung University Jang made his first appearance for the South Korea national baseball team at the 2nd World University Baseball Championship in Tainan City, Taiwan. There he led his team the bronze medal alongside Oh Seung-Hwan and Jeong Keun-Woo.

In 2005, Jang was selected for the South Korea national team again, and participated in the Baseball World Cup held in the Netherlands. He helped the team win the silver medal, finishing 4th in strikeouts (24). He pitched an eight shutout inning victory over South Africa in the preliminary round, and appeared in seven of South Korea's 11 games.

=== Notable international careers ===
Year	Venue	Competition	Team	Individual note
2004	Chinese Taipei	World University Baseball Championship	Bronze medal	
2005	Japan	Asian Baseball Championship	4th	
2005	Netherlands	Baseball World Cup	Silver medal	4th in strikeouts

== Professional career ==
=== Hyundai Unicorns & Heroes ===
Signed by the Hyundai Unicorns in 2006, Jang started his pro career as a starting pitcher. In the 2006 KBO season, he finished runner-up to Ryu Hyun-Jin for Rookie of the Year with 2nd in strikeouts (142), 5th in ERA (2.85) and 7th in wins (12), and was selected to the All-Star team. After the season, he was selected for the South Korea national team and competed in the 2006 Asian Games held in Doha, Qatar.

During the 2007 season, he went 9−10 with 132 strikeouts in 168.2 innings, finishing 10th in ERA (3.63).

In the 2008 season, Jang finished with a 12–8 record and a 2.85 ERA in 167.2 innings. He was 4th in wins, 5th in ERA and 4th in strikeouts (126). In August 2008, Jang competed for the South Korea national baseball team in the 2008 Summer Olympics, where they won the gold medal in the baseball tournament. In the tournament, he pitched a 10−0 complete game shutout victory over the Netherlands and tossed 4.1 innings of scoreless relief against China.

In March 2009, Jang was called up to the South Korea national baseball team for the 2009 World Baseball Classic prior to the 2009 KBO season, but had a disappointing performance, pitching to a 5.06 ERA. In South Korea's second game in Round 1 against Japan, Jang came on in relief in the 3rd inning but allowed 3 runs and 4 hits in 2.2 innings pitched. He started the Pool 1 title match against Japan in Round 2, but went only 3 innings allowing 2 runs and 5 hits including the solo home run by Seiichi Uchikawa. Jang struggled the 2009 KBO season with a 5.54 ERA and a record of 4-8, by far the worst of his career.

=== Samsung Lions ===
After the 2009 season, Jang was traded to the Samsung Lions with ₩3 billion won ($3 million). He bounced back in the 2010 season to finish sixth in the league in ERA (3.46), seventh in wins (13) and eighth in strikeouts (115).

=== Notable international careers ===
Year	Venue	Competition	Team	Individual note
2006	Qatar	Asian Games	Bronze medal	1−0; 2.45 ERA (2 G, 7.1 IP, 2 ER, 5 K)
2007	Chinese Taipei	Asian Baseball Championship	Silver medal	1-0; 0.00 ERA (2 G, 2.1 IP, 0 ER, 2 K)
2008	Chinese Taipei	Final Olympic Qualification Tournament	Silver medal	0−0; 1.80 ERA (2 G, 5 IP, 1 ER, 2 K)
2008	China	Olympic Games	Gold medal	1−0; 0.00 ERA (2 G, 12.1 IP, 0 ER, 11 K)
2009	United States	World Baseball Classic	Silver medal	0−0; 5.06 ERA (2 G, 5.1 IP, 3 ER, 4 K)

== Filmography ==
=== Television show ===
Year	Title	Role	Notes	Ref.
2022	Strongest Baseball	Cast Member		
2023	Golf Match Swing Star	Contestant		
