= Sho Iwasaki =

Japanese baseball player (born 1989)

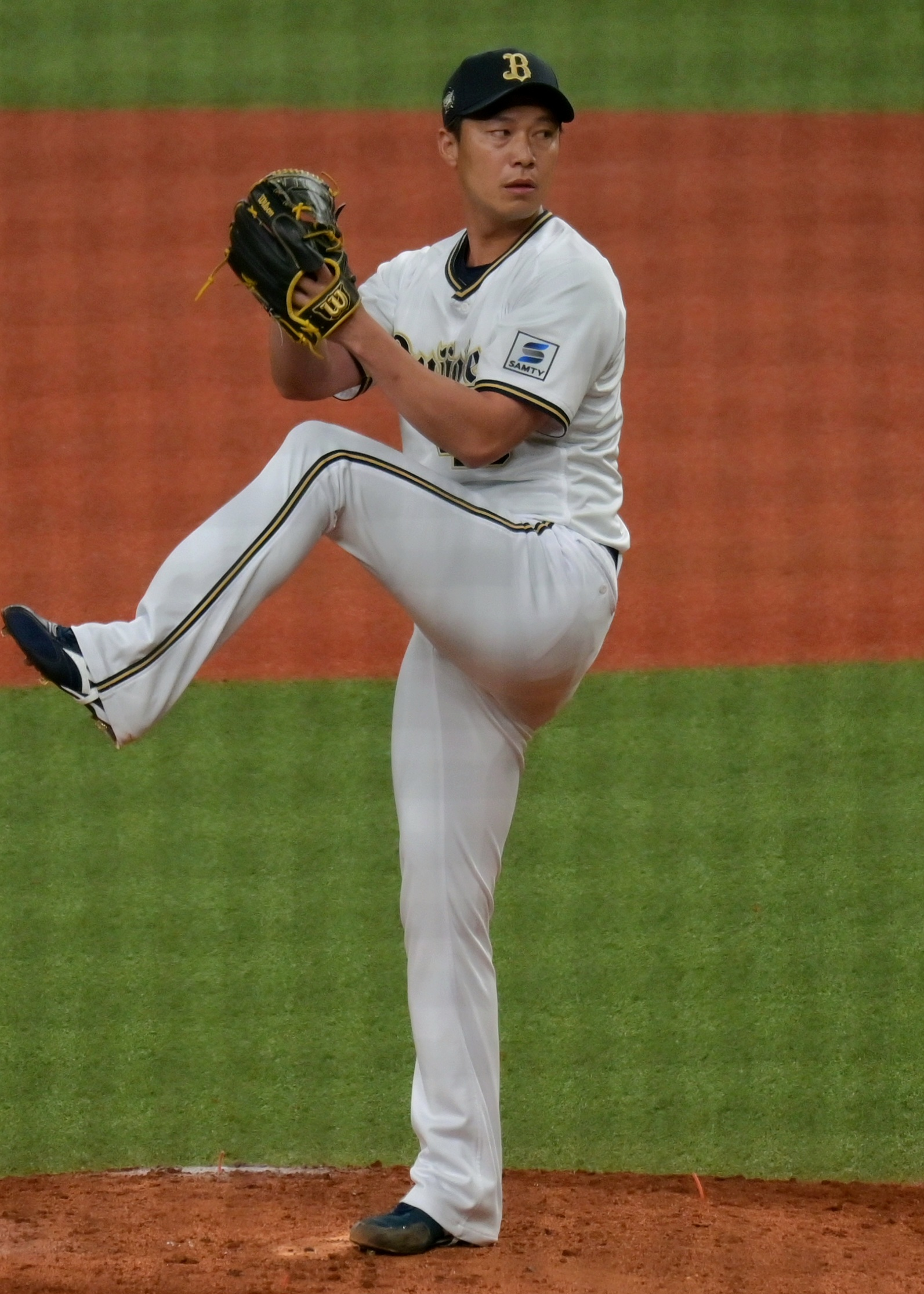
- Iwasaki with the Fukuoka SoftBank Hawks

Orix Buffaloes – No. 40
- Pitcher
- Born: October 21, 1989 (age 36); Funabashi, Chiba, Japan
- Bats: Right Throws: Right

NPB debut
- July 23, 2008, for the Fukuoka SoftBank Hawks

NPB statistics (through 2025 season)
- Win–loss record: 35-34
- Earned run average: 3.49
- Strikeouts: 479
- Saves: 11
- Holds: 113
- Stats at Baseball Reference

Teams
- Fukuoka SoftBank Hawks (2008–2021); Chunichi Dragons (2022–2025); Orix Buffaloes (2025–present)

Career highlights and awards
- 1× Pacific League Hold Champion (2017); 7× Japan Series Champion (2011, 2014, 2015, 2017–2020)

Sho Iwasaki (岩嵜 翔, Iwasaki Shō; born October 21, 1989) is a Japanese professional baseball pitcher for the Orix Buffaloes of Nippon Professional Baseball (NPB). He has previously played in NPB for the Fukuoka SoftBank Hawks and Chunichi Dragons.

== Professional career ==
On October 3, 2007, Iwasaki was drafted by the Fukuoka Softbank Hawks in the 2007 Nippon Professional Baseball draft.

=== 2008–2010 season ===
On July 23, 2008, Iwasaki pitched his debut game as a starting pitcher against the Orix Buffaloes.

In 2008 - 2010 season, he pitched 8 games in the Pacific League.

=== 2011–2015 season ===
On May 13, 2011, Iwasaki won the game for the first time in 4 years. In 2011 season, he finished the regular season with a 13 Games pitched, a 6–2 Win–loss record, a 2.72 ERA, a 33 strikeouts in 79 1/3 innings. And he was selected as the Japan Series roster in the 2011 Japan Series.

In 2012 season, Iwasaki finished the regular season with a 29 Games pitched, a 5–10 Win–loss record, a 3.14 ERA, a 3 Holds, a 77 strikeouts in 120 1/3 innings.

In 2013 season, Iwasaki pitched as a relief pitcher, and finished the regular season with a 47 Games pitched, a 1–4 Win–loss record, a 4.33 ERA, a 14 Holds, a two Saves, a 54 strikeouts in 68 2/3 innings.

In 2014 season, Iwasaki pitched as a starting pitcher, and finished the regular season with a 18 Games pitched, a 4–1 Win–loss record, a 4.06 ERA, a 3 Holds, a 37 strikeouts in 62 innings. And he pitched as a relief pitcher in the 2014 Japan Series.

In 2015 season, Iwasaki finished the regular season with a 8 Games pitched, a 1–0 Win–loss record, a 6.75 ERA, a 2 Holds, a 5 strikeouts in 10 1/3 innings. And he was selected as the Japan Series roster in the 2015 Japan Series.

=== 2016–2020 season ===
In 2016 season, Iwasaki finished the regular season with 35 appearances, a 4–2 record, a 1.95 ERA, one save, and 61 strikeouts across 87 2/3 innings pitched.

In 2017 season, Iwasaki finished the regular season as a setup man, compiling a 6–3 record, 1.99 ERA, two saves, and 66 strikeouts over 72 1/3 inning of work; he additionally led the Pacific League in holds with 72 (a new Hawks record).

On April 10, 2018, Iwasaki had right elbow surgery and spent the rest of the season on rehabilitation.

On August 21, 2019, Iwasaki returned from surgery and pitched for the first time in a year and three months. He additionally pitched in the 2019 Japan Series.

In 2020 season, Iwasaki finished the regular season with a 17 games pitched, an 0–2 record, 7.20 ERA, and 20 strikeouts in 15 innings. In the 2020 Japan Series against the Yomiuri Giants, he pitched in two games, Game 2 and Game 4, and contributed to the team's fourth consecutive Japan Series championship with no hits and no runs allowed.

=== Orix Buffaloes ===
On May 30, 2025, Iwasaki was traded to the Orix Buffaloes in exchange for cash considerations. On June 20, Iwasaki became the 10th pitcher in NPB history to win a game in both leagues during the same season, having won on April 1 as a member of the Chunichi Dragons.
