= Tomoaki Satoh (baseball, born 1978) =

Japanese baseball player and coach (born 1978)

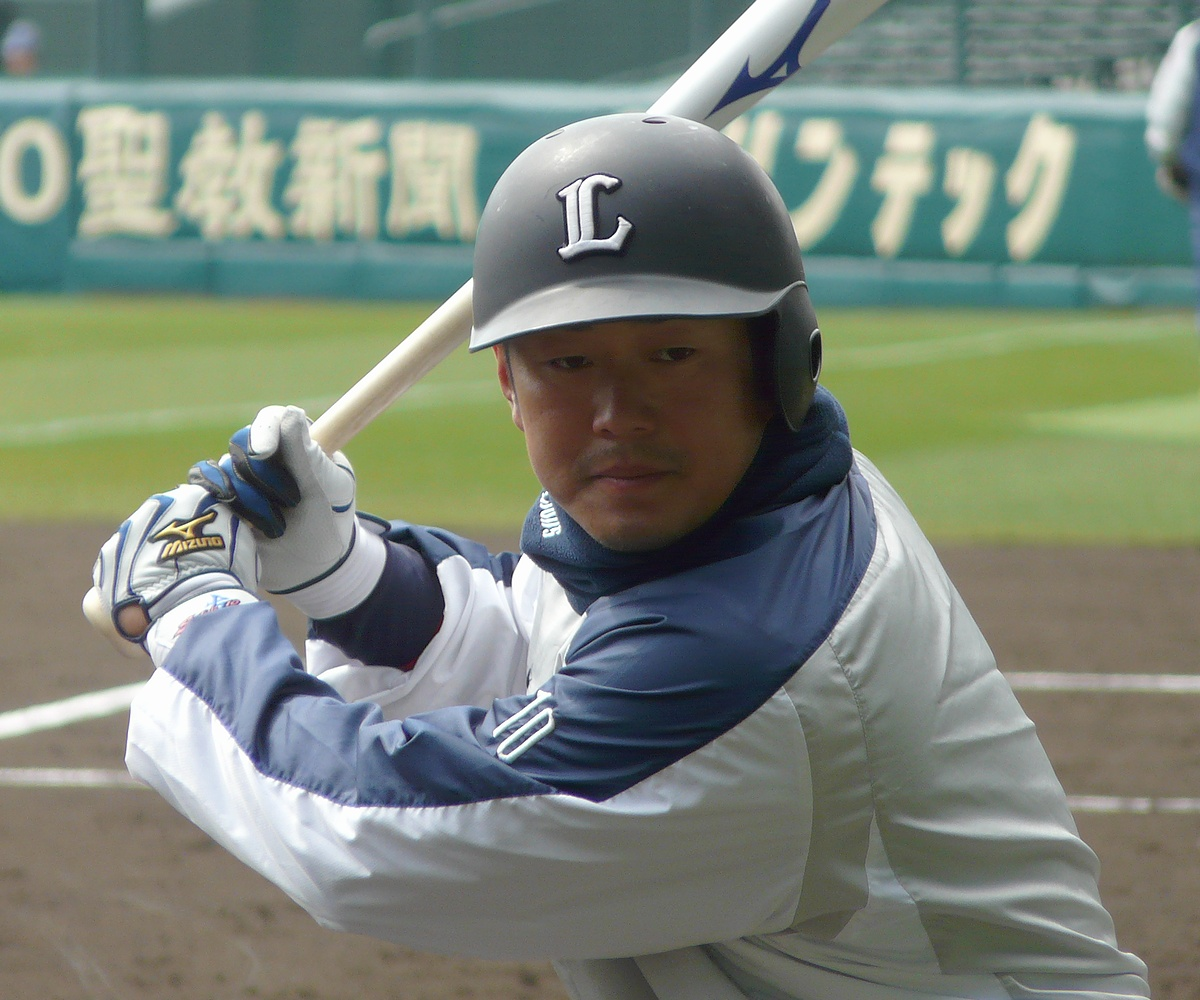

Hokkaido Nippon Ham Fighters – No. 87
- Outfielder / Coach
- Born: June 13, 1978 (age 47)
- Batted: Right Threw: Right

NPB debut
- March 24, 2001, for the Seibu Lions

Last NPB appearance
- April 25, 2012, for the Saitama Seibu Lions

NPB statistics (through 2012)
- Batting average: .255
- Hits: 410
- Home runs: 9
- RBI: 123
- Stolen bases: 52

Teams
- As player: Seibu Lions/Saitama Seibu Lions (2001–2012); As coach: Saitama Seibu Lions (2016–2022); Hokkaido Nippon-Ham Fighters (2023–)

Career highlights and awards
- MVP of 2008 Asia Series; 2× Japan Series champion (2004, 2008)

Tomoaki Satoh (佐藤 友亮, Satō Tomoaki; born in Fujisawa, Kanagawa) is a Japanese professional baseball player. He is currently with the Saitama Seibu Lions in Japan's Nippon Professional Baseball. In 2008, he was selected Most Valuable Player of the 2008 Asia Series.
