= Masato Watanabe =

Japanese baseball player (born 1979)

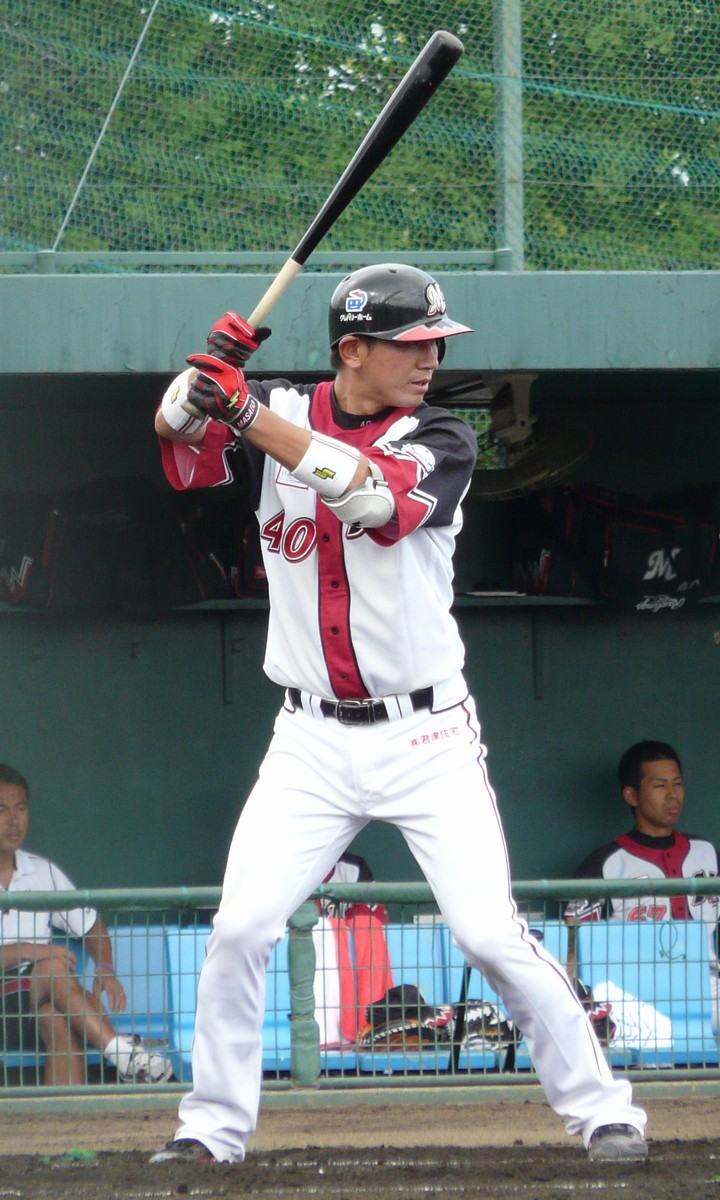
- Watanabe with the Chiba Lotte Marines

Tohoku Rakuten Golden Eagles – No. 83
- Infielder / Coach
- Born: April 3, 1979 (age 47); Jōtō-ku, Osaka, Japan
- Batted: Right Threw: Right

NPB debut
- 2001, for the Chiba Lotte Marines

Last NPB appearance
- April 13, 2012, for the Chiba Lotte Marines

NPB statistics
- Batting average: .207
- Home runs: 11
- RBI: 71
- Stats at Baseball Reference

Teams
- As player: Chiba Lotte Marines (2001–2012); As coach: Tohoku Rakuten Golden Eagles (2026–present)

Masato Watanabe (渡辺 正人, born April 3, 1979, in Osaka) is a Japanese former professional baseball infielder. He played in Nippon Professional Baseball (NPB) for the Chiba Lotte Marines from 2001 to 2012.
