= Kazunari Sanematsu =

Japanese baseball player and coach (born 1981)

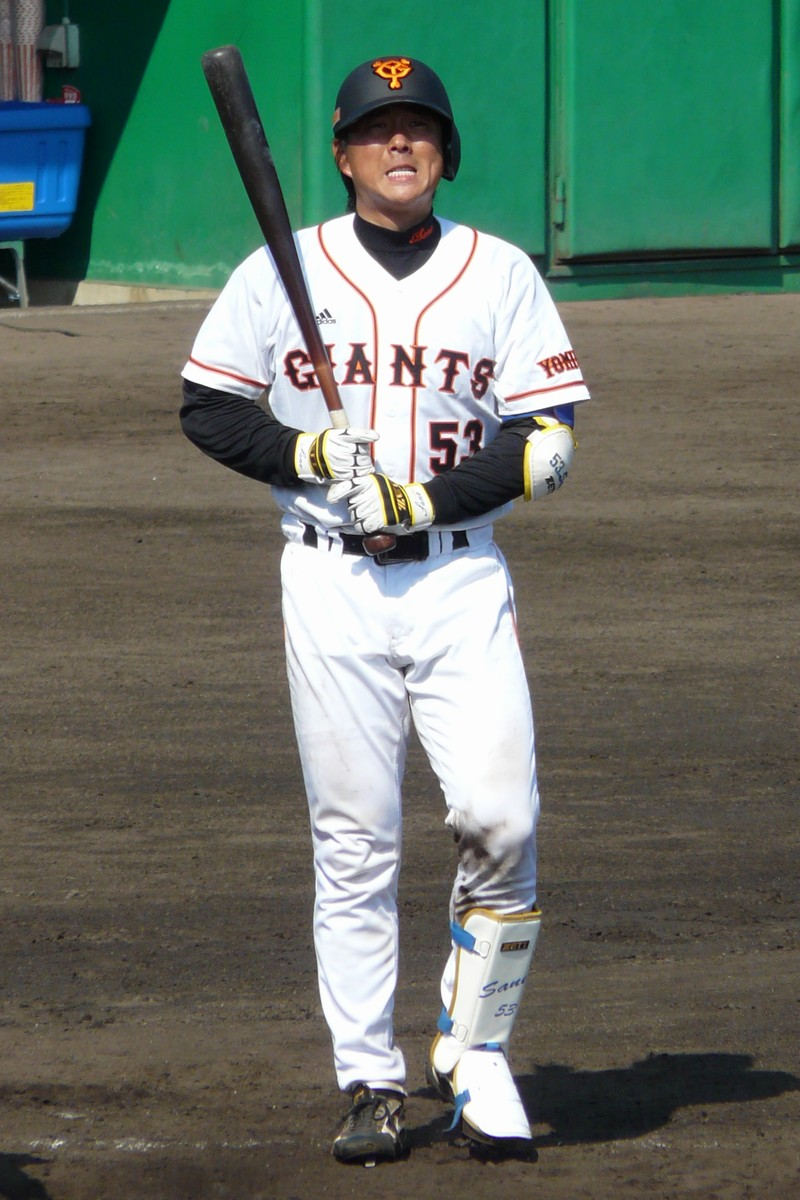
- Sanematsu with the Yomiuri Giants

Yomiuri Giants – No. 88
- Catcher / Coach
- Born: January 18, 1981 (age 45); Saga, Japan
- Bats: Right Throws: Right

NPB debut
- May 20, 2000, for the Nippon Ham Fighters

NPB statistics (through 2016 season)
- Batting average: .168
- Hits: 137
- RBIs: 58
- Stats at Baseball Reference

Teams
- As player: Nippon Ham Fighters/Hokkaido Nippon Ham Fighters (2000 – 2005, 2018 – 2019); Yomiuri Giants (2006–2017); As coach: Hokkaido Nippon-Ham Fighters (2018–2019); Yomiuri Giants (2020–2022, 2024–present)
- Last updated on: 25 March 2023

Kazunari Sanematsu (實松 一成, Sanematsu Kazunari; born January 18, 1981) is a Japanese Nippon Professional Baseball player for the Hokkaido Nippon-Ham Fighters in Japan's Pacific League. Before playing for the Fighters he was a member of the Yomiuri Giants.
