= Lee Young-uk =

South Korean baseball player

- Relief pitcher
- Born: August 13, 1980 (age 45); Daegu, South Korea
- Bats: Right Throws: Right

KBO debut
- 2005, for the Samsung Lions

KBO statistics (through 2013 season)
- Win–loss record: 16-17
- Saves: 0
- Earned run average: 3.90

Teams
- SK Wyverns (2003–2013); Samsung Lions (2014); Kia Tigers (2015)

Lee Young-uk (Korean: 이영욱; Hanja: 李永旭; born August 13, 1980, in Daegu) is a retired professional baseball player who played for the Samsung Lions of the KBO League.

== Statistics ==
Year	Team	ERA	G	W	L	SV	H	IP	K	H	HR	BB	R	ER
2005	SK	2.51	39	1	0	0	1	64.2	41	59	5	26	19	18
2006	SK	3.21	55	6	5	0	3	94.2	52	87	5	34	36	32
2007	SK	4.83	26	3	3	0	1	59.2	24	70	6	29	35	32
2008	SK	3.60	19	2	3	0	2	45	44	33	3	21	21	18
2011	SK	4.59	20	4	4	0	0	66.2	46	58	8	24	35	34
2012	SK	2.74	11	0	2	0	0	32.1	15	28	3	22	20	20
2013	SK	2.74	1	0	0	0	0	1	1	2	1	1	3	3
Total	SK	3.90	171	16	17	0	7	362	223	337	31	157	169	157
