= Chen Wei (baseball) =

Chinese baseball player

Chen Wei 陈 玮
- Pitcher
- Born: June 11, 1983 (age 42); Tianjin, China
- Bats: Right Throws: Right

Teams
- Tianjin Lions (2000 – 2008)); Yokohama BayStars (2009 – 2010); Tianjin Liones (2011)

Chen Wei (born in Tianjin, China; he is also known as Wei Chen) is a former baseball pitcher who was most notable for being on China's roster for the 2009 World Baseball Classic. He also appeared in the 2006 Haarlem Baseball Week, allowing two runs in one inning of work. In December, 2008, he signed a player development contract with the Yokohama BayStars.

He did not actually play in the World Baseball Classic.
