= Zhang Li (baseball) =

Chinese baseball player

Zhang Li (simplified Chinese: 张力; traditional Chinese: 張力; pinyin: Zhāng Lì; born 3 February 1980 in Shanghai, China) is a Chinese baseball player who was a member of Team China at the 2008 Summer Olympics.

== Sports career ==
- 1989-1994 Changning District Dingxi Middle School;
- 1994-1996 Pudong Chuansha Peihua Middle School;
- 1996-1998 Shanghai Water Sports Center;
- 1998–present Shanghai Municipal Sports School;
- 2004 National Baseball Team

== Major performances ==
- 1997 National Championship - 1st;
- 2005 National Games - 2nd;
- 2005 Asian Championship - 3rd;
- 2006 Asian Games - 4th
