= Lee Young-wook =

South Korean baseball player

- Outfielder
- Born: October 11, 1985 (age 40)
- Batted: Left Threw: Left

KBO debut
- March 29, 2008, for the Samsung Lions

Last KBO appearance
- 2018, for the Kia Tigers

KBO statistics
- Batting average: .243
- Home runs: 12
- Runs batted in: 104
- Stats at Baseball Reference

Teams
- Samsung Lions (2008–2011, 2014–2017); Kia Tigers (2018)

- Lee Young-wook
- Hangul: 이영욱
- Hanja: 李英旭
- RR: I Yeonguk
- MR: I Yŏnguk

Lee Young-wook (born October 11, 1985, in Seoul) is an outfielder who is a free agent. He previously played for the Samsung Lions, and Kia Tigers in the Korea Professional Baseball. He bats and throws left-handed.

== Amateur career ==
Lee attended Choongang High School in Seoul. In 2003, his last season playing for them, Lee led his team to runners-up at the Phoenix Flag National Championship, finishing third in batting (.450).

In 2004, Lee entered Dongguk University. In July 2006, as a junior at Dongguk University, Lee got his first call-up to the South Korea national baseball team and competed in the team's three friendly baseball matches against the USA national baseball team in Durham, North Carolina, as a starting center fielder. He hit a single off future Orioles top pitching prospect Jake Arrieta in Game 3 but struggled at the plate during the series, going 1-for-6 with a run.

=== Notable international careers ===
Year	Venue	Competition	Team	Individual note
2006	United States	South Korea vs USA Baseball Championship	1W-2L	.167 BA (1-for-6), 1 R

== Professional career ==
Lee was selected by the Samsung Lions with the 48th pick of the 2008 KBO Draft. In 2008 Lee only played in 14 games and went 0-for-7, spending most of his rookie season in the Korea Baseball Futures League.

In 2009 Lee was promoted to the first team squad in the Lions to provide backup to Park Han-yi as their other center fielder, and he finished that season with a .249 batting average (48-for-193), 29 runs batted in, 4 home runs and 16 stolen bases in 88 games.

In 2010 Lee stole 30 bases, which ranked him seventh in the KBO league, and his batting average jumped to .272, earning him a promotion to the Lions' everyday center fielder.
