= Rakuten Monkeys =

Professional baseball team in Taoyuan, Taiwan

- 樂天桃猿

Logo	Cap insignia

Information
- League: Chinese Professional Baseball League
- Location: Taoyuan
- Ballpark: Rakuten Taoyuan Baseball Stadium
- Founded: 2003; 23 years ago
- Taiwan Series championships: (8): 2006; 2012; 2014; 2015; 2017; 2018; 2019; 2025
- Playoff berths: (14): 2006; 2007; 2008; 2011; 2012; 2014; 2015; 2017; 2018; 2019; 2022; 2023; 2024; 2025
- Former name: First Financial Holdings Agan (2003); La New Bears (2004–2010); Lamigo Monkeys (2011–2019)
- Colors: White and red
- Mascot: Rocky, Monkey, Victor
- Retired numbers: 10; 52
- Ownership: Rakuten
- Manager: Tseng Hao-chu
- Website: monkeys.rakuten.com.tw

The Rakuten Monkeys (Chinese: 樂天桃猿; pinyin: Lètiān Táoyuán; lit. 'Rakuten Taoyuan Monkeys'), formerly known as La New Bears (2004–2010) and Lamigo Monkeys (2011–2019), are a professional baseball team in the Chinese Professional Baseball League (CPBL) in Taiwan. Owned and administered by the Japanese technology conglomerate Rakuten, the Monkeys qualified for the playoffs in 2006 for the first time in team history, and by finishing with the best record in the entire season, gained an automatic berth for the Taiwan Series.

== History ==
=== First Financial Holdings Agan (2003) ===
First known as the First Securities Agan, the team was owned by the First Financial Holding Corporation, a government-funded financial holding service institute. Its then-chairman Chen Chien-lung was a keen political supporter of President Chen Shui-bian, and, upon the president's request, immediately agreed to take over one of the two former Taiwan Major League (TML) teams after TML was merged into CPBL in January 2003.

Since Macoto Bank had already decided to take-over the Macoto Gida, Chen Chien-lung took over the Agan as promised. The majority of Agan's player came from Taipei Gida and Kaohsiung-Pingtung Fala, and not from the Taichung Agan, which carried the same mascot and were the champions of the final season of TML. Agan played its home games at Chengcing Lake Baseball Field.

After Chen Chien-lung's sudden resignation due to allegation of insider trading in August 2003, the First Financial Holding Corporation no longer showed willingness in running the team. The Agan finished the 2003 season placing fifth overall, and did not win any of the 20 games against Brother Elephants, the Taiwan Series champions of that season.

=== La New Bears (2004–2010) ===
Just before the 2004 season, Kaohsiung County Magistrate Yang Chiu-hsing invited the La New Corporation, a footwear manufacturer to sponsor the then-vacant Chengcing Lake Baseball Field, which was under the management of Kaohsiung County after the disbandment of Taiwan Major League. La New Corporation eventually agreed and, in addition, offered to buy the First Financial Holdings Agan, whose management had been struggling in the past season.

In December 2003, La New completed the process with First Financial Holdings and renamed the team La New Bears. In the first two years of their existence, the Bears did not perform well. But after several additions to the roster through drafts and the minor league, the Bears turned the team around, eventually winning the 2006 Taiwan Series title.

=== Lamigo Monkeys (2011–2019) ===
Lamigo Monkeys logo

After several years of futile effort to manage the Kaohsiung market, the team relocated to Taoyuan County (now Taoyuan City) and changed its name to Lamigo Monkeys in January 2011. Lamigo is a subsidiary of La New Corporation that operates a wellness center, restaurants as well as a travel agency in northern Taiwan.

Since Lamigo is based in northern Taiwan, the team was moved to Taoyuan International Baseball Stadium in Taoyuan County. Their new Chinese name, taoyuan (Chinese: 桃猿), is a homophone to their new home county. Despite the name change, La New Corporation retained its direct ownership of the team.

In 2012, the Monkeys won their first seasonal title after the name change when they defeated Uni-President 7-Eleven Lions four games to one in Taiwan Series.

In July 2019, the organization announced that the team would be sold. In September 2019, negotiations with Rakuten to acquire the team closed successfully. With the sale, Rakuten became the first foreign company to own a Chinese Professional Baseball League team. Terms of the sale were not disclosed.

=== Rakuten Monkeys (2020–present) ===
The team name was formally changed to the Rakuten Monkeys on 17 December 2019. New uniforms were also revealed, similar in design to the Tohoku Rakuten Golden Eagles uniforms.

In 2020, fans were not allowed to attend sporting events in Taiwan due to the coronavirus pandemic. The Rakuten Monkeys decided to place robotic mannequins in the stands to simulate the appearance of fans at their games.

In 2025, the Rakuten Monkeys won their first Taiwan Series title since the 2019 Rakuten takeover, having defeated the CTBC Brothers in five games.

== Ballpark ==
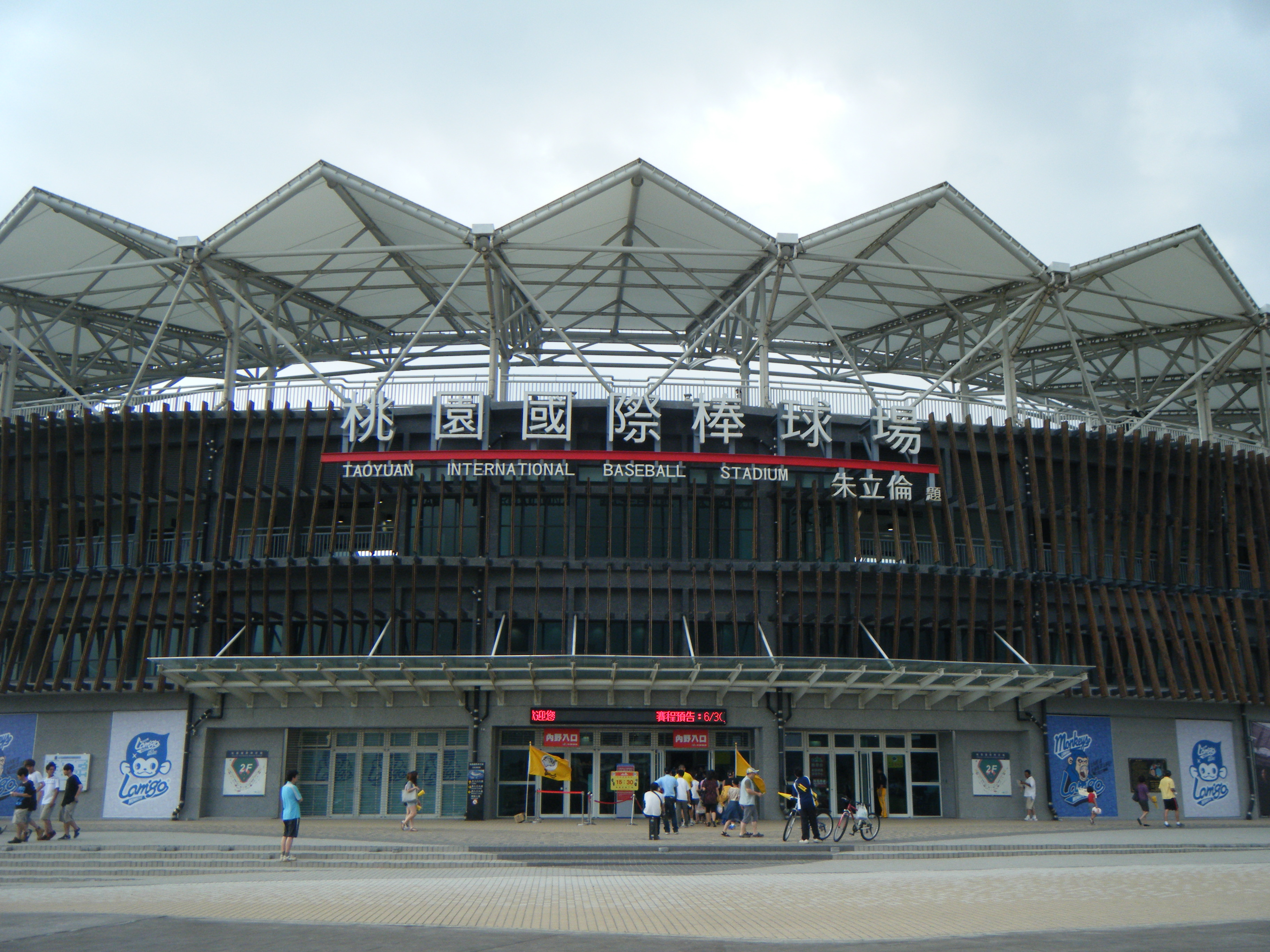
Taoyuan International Baseball Stadium

The team played their home games at Chengcing Lake Baseball Field in Kaohsiung County from 2004 to 2010.

In the 2011 season, they moved to Taoyuan International Baseball Stadium. Accordingly, the team's name was changed to the Lamigo Monkeys.

== Records ==
Qualified for playoffs	Taiwan Series Championship

=== Regular seasons ===
Season	Wins	Losses	Ties	Winning pct.	Place
First Financial Holdings Agan
2003	20 (9/11)	71 (37/34)	9 (4/5)	.220 (.196/.244)	5 (6/5)
La New Bears
2004	40 (18/22)	56 (30/26)	4 (2/2)	.417 (.375/.458)	6 (6/5)
2005	42 (16/26)	55 (32/23)	3 (2/1)	.433 (.333/.531)	6 (6/2)
2006	62 (30/32)	34 (19/15)	4 (1/3)	.646 (.612/.681)	1 (1/1)
2007	58 (26/32)	42 (24/18)	0 (0/0)	.580 (.520/.640)	2 (3/1)
2008	61 (28/33)	35 (19/16)	4 (3/1)	.635 (.596/.673)	2 (2/1)
2009	61 (33/28)	58 (26/32)	1 (1/0)	.513 (.559/.467)	2 (2/4)
2010	55 (31/24)	62 (27/35)	3 (2/1)	.470 (.534/.407)	3 (2/4)
Lamigo Monkeys
2011	66 (33/33)	52 (26/26)	2 (1/1)	.559 (.559/.559)	1 (2/1)
2012	66 (28/38)	52 (30/22)	2 (2/0)	.559 (.483/.633)	2 (2/1)
2013	58 (28/30)	60 (32/28)	2 (0/2)	.492 (.467/.517)	3 (3/2)
2014	66 (39/27)	51 (19/32)	3 (2/1)	.564 (.672/.458)	1 (1/3)
2015	68 (37/31)	52 (23/29)	0 (0/0)	.567 (.617/.517)	1 (1/2)
2016	53 (27/26)	64 (31/33)	3 (2/1)	.453 (.466/.441)	4 (3/3)
2017	78 (43/35)	41 (16/25)	1 (1/0)	.655 (.729/.583)	1 (1/1)
2018	73 (38/35)	47 (22/25)	0 (0/0)	.608 (.633/.583)	1 (1/1)
2019	63 (35/28)	55 (24/31)	2 (1/1)	.534 (.593/.475)	2 (1/3)
Rakuten Monkeys
2020	59 (34/25)	61 (26/35)	0 (0/0)	.492 (.567/.417)	2 (2/4)
2021	56 (30/26)	61 (30/31)	3 (0/3)	.479 (.500/.456)	3 (3/5)
2022	70 (37/33)	46 (22/24)	4 (1/3)	.603 (.627/.579)	1 (1/2)
2023	60 (29/31)	56 (28/28)	4 (3/1)	.517 (.509/.525)	3 (3/2)
2024	62 (33/29)	57 (27/30)	1 (0/1)	.521 (.550/.492)	3 (2/3)
2025	62 (30/32)	57 (30/27)	1 (0/1)	.521 (.500/.542)	3 (3/2)
2026	57 (24/33)	61 (34/27)	2 (2/0)	.483 (.414/.550)	4 (5/3)

=== Playoffs ===
Season	First round			Taiwan Series		
Season	Opponent	Wins	Losses	Opponent	Wins	Losses
La New Bears
2006	Did not play			Uni-President Lions	4	0
2007	Did not play			Uni-President Lions	3	4
2008	Brother Elephants	0	3	Eliminated		
Lamigo Monkeys
2011	Did not play			Uni-President 7-Eleven Lions	1	4
2012	Did not play			Uni-President 7-Eleven Lions	4	1
2014	Did not play			CTBC Brothers	4	1
2015	Did not play			CTBC Brothers	4	3
2017	Did not play			CTBC Brothers	4	1
2018	Did not play			Uni-President 7-Eleven Lions	4	2
2019	Did not play			CTBC Brothers	4	1
Rakuten Monkeys
2022	Did not play			CTBC Brothers	0	4
2023	Uni-President 7-Eleven Lions	3	1	Wei Chuan Dragons	3	4
2024	Uni-President 7-Eleven Lions	1	3	Eliminated		
2025	Uni-President 7-Eleven Lions	3	2	CTBC Brothers	4	1

=== Asia Series ===
Year	Round robin			Championship round	
Year	Wins	Losses	Standing	Opponent	Result
La New Bears
2006	2	1	2	Hokkaido Nippon-Ham Fighters	0–1 (L)
Lamigo Monkeys
2012	2	0	1	Yomiuri Giants	3–6 (L)

== Roster ==
Rakuten Monkeys roster
Players			Coaches
Pitchers: 00 (Taiwan) Su Chun-chang; 9 (Taiwan) Chen Bo-hao; 17 (Taiwan) Chen Kuan-yu; 21 (Mexico) Marcelo Martinez; 22 (Taiwan) Chu Cheng-yang; 23 (Taiwan) Tseng Jen-ho; 46 (Taiwan) Chiu Chun-wei; 48 (Taiwan) Lu Yung-chen; 49 (Dominican Republic) Pedro Fernández; 64 (Taiwan) Wang Chih-hsuan; 69 (Taiwan) Huang Tzu-peng; 77 (Taiwan) Chuang Hsin-yen	Catchers: 2 (Taiwan) Sung Jia-xiang; 11 (Taiwan) Lin Hung-yu; 28 (Taiwan) Chang Min-hsun; Infielders: 5 (Taiwan) Liang Chia-jung; 6 (Taiwan) Lin Chen-fei; 15 (Taiwan) Lin Tzu-wei; 39 (Taiwan) Lin Li; 45 (Taiwan) Feng Chien-ting; 79 (Taiwan) Lin Chih-ping; 94 (Taiwan) Ma Chieh-sen; 95 (Taiwan) Lee Hsun-chieh	Outfielders: 35 (Taiwan) Cheng Chin; 36 (Taiwan) Yu Te-lung; 65 (Taiwan) Lin Cheng-hua; 98 (Taiwan) Chen Chen-wei	Manager: 87 (Japan) Kenji Furukubo; Coaches: 41 (Taiwan) Cheng Chao-hang (fielding); 42 (Taiwan) Hong Quan-yi (strength and conditioning); 43 (Taiwan) Lin Ying-chieh (bullpen); 50 (Taiwan) Hsu Yueh-teng (battery); 59 (Taiwan) Liu Pin-chen (strength and conditioning); 73 (Japan) Tsuyoshi Kawagishi (pitching); 90 (Taiwan) Lin Cheng-yi(hitting); 96 (Taiwan) Weng Ko-yao (fielding); 99 (Taiwan) Tseng Hao-chu (bench/hitting); Second team manager: 91 (Taiwan) Chen Yan-feng; Second team coaches: 12 (Taiwan) Wu Chieh-jui (hitting); 30 (Taiwan) Lin Chih-yu (hitting); 47 (Taiwan) Hsu Yu-hao (catching); 61 (Taiwan) Tsai Ming-chin (pitching); 68 (Japan) Daisuke Hirose (performance); 71 (Taiwan) Chen Je-cheng (infield); 72 (Taiwan) Lin Kuo-yu (pitching); 78 (Taiwan) Lee Wei-ching (strength and conditioning); 84 (Taiwan) Lux Hong-ki (strength and conditioning); 86 (Taiwan) Tsai Cheng-shian (hitting); 93 (Taiwan) Chang Wei-chien (assistant); Roster updated on 11 August 2025

=== List of managers ===
No.	Name	Years	Playoffs	Championships
1	Hsu Sheng-ming	2003	0	0
2	Takuji Ohta	2004	0	0
3	Hong I-chung	2004–2009	3	1
4	Tsai Jung-tsung	2010	0	0
—	Hong I-chung	2011–2019	7	6
5	Tseng Hao-chu	2020–2023	2	0
6	Kenji Furukubo	2024–2025	2	1
7	Tseng Hao-chu	2026–present	0	0

=== Retired numbers ===
- 10 – The number is reserved for the fans, as the tenth player on the field.
- 52 – The number is retired in honour of Chin-Feng Chen since September 2016.
