= China Stars =

Chinese baseball team

The China Stars was a baseball team established in 2005. It was made up of the best players in the China Baseball League. The team was established in purpose of playing with the winners from the professional baseball league in Japan, Taiwan, and Korea in the annual Konami Cup Asia Series. The China Stars lost all the 9 games in their three participations.

Since 2008, the China Baseball League send their series Champion to the Asia Series like the other 3 leagues do, the China Stars was disbanded.
