= China Baseball League =

Chinese professional baseball league

China Baseball League (CBL)
- Sport: Baseball
- Founded: 2002
- No. of teams: 8
- Country: China
- Continent: Asia
- Qualification: Asia Series (2005–2008, 2012)
- Level on pyramid: 1
- Website: baseball.sport.org.cn

The China Baseball League (Chinese: 中国棒球联赛, CBL) is a semi-professional baseball league under the administration of Chinese Baseball Association, founded in 2002. The league has suspended operations and returned multiple times in its history. During 2019 to 2023, the league was trying to turn into pure professional league, which was named as China National Baseball League. However it turned out failed and the league returned as semi-pro league China Baseball League again. As of 2026, the league co-exists with the new league Chinese Professional Baseball (CPB) as the main professional league in the nation.

China Baseball League (China)

== Clubs ==
Team	Location	Stadium
Beijing Tigers (北京猛虎)	Beijing	Lucheng Field
Guangdong Leopards (广东猎豹)	Guangzhou, Guangdong	Zhongshan Stadium, Huangcun Baseball Stadium, Tianhe Baseball Field
Jiangsu Huge Horses (江苏钜马)	Wuxi, Jiangsu	Wuxi Baseball Stadium
Shanghai Golden Eagles (上海红鹰)	Shanghai	Shanghai Sports Palace, Kangbei Baseball and Softball Stadium
Sichuan Dragons (四川蛟龙)	Chengdu, Sichuan	Jinniu Stadium
Tianjin Lions (天津雄狮)	Tianjin	Tianjin Dodger Stadium
Shandong Blue Whales (山东蓝鲸)	Shandong	
Henan Wolf Warriors (河南战狼)	Zhengzhou, Henan	

The original four teams were the Beijing Tigers, Tianjin Lions, Shanghai Eagles and Guangzhou Lightning. The Hope Stars and Dragons joined them in 2005. The Hope Stars were an under-21 team of promising players from around the country. Henan Elephants entered CBL as an expansion team in 2009.

== History ==
The first season ran from April 26 to May 25, 2002 with a one-game championship.

In the 2004 season, the defending champion Beijing Tigers once again defeated the Tianjin Lions in the best-of-five finals. They came back from an 0-2 deficit to win the series 3 games to 2.

The opening day of the 2005 season was April 1, 2005. The regular season ended on June 26. In the 2005 best-of-five championship series, the Beijing Tigers swept the Tianjin Lions, three games to none, giving the Tigers their third straight title. (The 2005 championship series was abbreviated to three games due to SARS.)

The league suspended operations in 2012 due to financial troubles after the 2011 season, but returned in 2014.

In 2014 the CBL returned with a six-game regular season with four teams - the Tigers and Pegasus in the North Division and the Leopards and Lions in the South Division. In the finals the Tigers defeated the Lions in the best-of-three finals two games to one. hotStar United began sponsoring the CBL in 2014.

The 2015 regular season featured six teams from Division 1 playing 15 games each. Division 2 teams played six games each. The Jiangsu Pegasus swept the Beijing Tigers two games to none to win their first-ever championship.

The 2016 China Baseball League opened on May 5 at the baseball base in Wuxi, Jiangsu. The new season of the China Baseball League has a longer schedule than previous years, with more games, and the number of participating teams has increased from a minimum of 27 to 6. The 10 top domestic teams consisting of Beijing Tigers, Tianjin Lions, Shanghai Golden Eagles, Jiangsu Juma, Sichuan Jiaolong, Guangdong Cheetahs and Group B teams will play nearly 10 fierce battles in the league.

The 2016 China Baseball League was divided into two stages: the regular season and the finals. The regular season will run for ten weeks, with 30 rounds and the finals lasting two weeks, using a best-of-five format, with the team that wins three games first to win the championship. Every weekend, from May 5 to September 3, the baseball league will feature nine pinnacle showdowns in three different cities. The six Group A teams will play a two-game home and away round-robin match. The four Group B teams will also strive to finish sixth in Group A and secure promotion places next year.

In 2024, the Fujian Sharks joined as an expansion team.

The 2025 season opened on March 21, 2025 in Zhongshan, Guangdong with a planned schedule of 139 games, concluding with a June championship series held in Tianjin.

Finals scores
Season	Champions	Scores	Runners-up
2002	Tianjin Lions	1–0	Beijing Tigers
2003	Beijing Tigers	3–2	Tianjin Lions
2004	Beijing Tigers	3–2	Tianjin Lions
2005	Beijing Tigers	2–0	Tianjin Lions
2006	Tianjin Lions	3–0	Guangdong cheetah
2007	Tianjin Lions	3–1	Guangdong cheetah
2008	Tianjin Lions	3–0	Beijing Tigers
2009	Beijing Tigers	1–0	Guangdong cheetah
2010	Guangdong cheetah	2–0	Beijing Tigers
2011	Tianjin Lions	2–1	Guangdong cheetah
2012	Discontinued for financial reasons		
2013	Discontinued for financial reasons		
2014	Beijing Tigers	2–1	Tianjin Lions
2015	Jiangsu Tianma	2–0	Beijing Tigers
2016	Tianjin Lions	3–0	Beijing Tigers
2024	Jiangsu Huge Horses	2–0	Beijing Tigers
2025	Shanghai Huaxin	2–1	Jiangsu Huge Horses

== Chinese Baseball League winners ==
Champions leaderboard
Team	Number of champions	Number of runners-up	Champion year	Runner-up year
Tianjin Lions	6	4	2002, 2006, 2007, 2008, 2011, 2016	2003, 2004, 2005, 2014
Beijing Tigers	5	5	2003, 2004, 2005, 2009, 2014	2002, 2008, 2010, 2015, 2016
Guangdong cheetah	1	4	2010	2006, 2007, 2009, 2011
Jiangsu Juma	1	0	2015	-

== Partnership with Nippon Professional Baseball ==
In 2007, the CBL began a support relationship with Nippon Professional Baseball, Japan's baseball league. The agreement allows the Japanese clubs to send coaches and players to China and Chinese players to train at the Japanese facilities.

All teams will have a Japanese team as a partner. Beijing will pair with the Yomiuri Giants, Sichuan with the Fukuoka SoftBank Hawks, Shanghai with the Hanshin Tigers, Jiangsu with the Chiba Lotte Marines and Guangdong with the Hiroshima Toyo Carp. Tianjin will continue its existing relationship with the Yokohama BayStars which began in 2005.

== See also ==
- Baseball awards
- China Stars
- Chinese Baseball Association
- MLB China Series
