= 2007 Uni-President Lions season =

The Uni-President Lions began their 2007 season by playing against La New Bears at Chengching Lake Baseball Field on March 17. The season concluded in late October, with the Lions winning the Taiwan Series and participating in the Asia Series.

== Regular season ==
2007 Uni-President Lions Season Game Log

Games won	Games lost	Games tied	Games postponed

March

Date	Opponent	Score	Win	Loss	Save	Attend.
3 / 17	@ La New Bears	4 – 5	Liang Ju-hao	Pan Wei-lun	Huang Chun-chung	10,012
3 / 18	@ La New Bears	4 – 1	Rob Cordemans	Horacio Estrada	Tseng Yi-cheng	3,054
3 / 22	Chinatrust Whales	7 – 9	Miguel Saladin	Kao Lung-wei	Ni Fu-deh	1,820
3 / 23	Chinatrust Whales	4 – 5	Du Chang-wei	Pan Wei-lun	Miguel Saladin	1,207
3 / 24	La New Bears	1 – 5	Gary Rath	Jeriome Robertson		3,008
3 / 25	La New Bears	1 – 6	Horacio Estrada	Rob Cordemans	Huang Chun-chung	2,734
3 / 27	Brother Elephants	Postponed Rescheduled for June 19				
3 / 28	Brother Elephants	0 – 4	Joey Dawley	Tsao Chun-yang	Chuang Wei-chuan	2,032
3 / 31	@ Macoto Cobras	11 – 5	Pan Wei-lun	Diegomar Markwell		2,275

April

Date	Opponent	Score	Win	Loss	Save	Attend.
4 / 1	@ Macoto Cobras	6 – 9	Lee Min-chin	Shen Po-tsang	Travis Minix	2,115
4 / 3	@ Chinatrust Whales	4 – 2	Rob Cordemans	Shen Yu-chieh	Kao Lung-wei	508
4 / 4	@ Chinatrust Whales	9 – 8	Tseng Yi-cheng	Ni Fu-deh	Kao Lung-wei	618
4 / 5	@ Brother Elephants	10 – 11	Yeh Ting-jen	Kao Lung-wei		6,525
4 / 6	@ Brother Elephants	1 – 5	Nick Bierbrodt	Jeriome Robertson	Chuang Wei-chuan	4,793
4 / 10	Macoto Cobras	7 – 15	Kléber Ojima	Rob Cordemans		1,026
4 / 11	Macoto Cobras	2 – 6	Huang Chin-chih	Jeriome Robertson		1,167
4 / 14	@ Sinon Bulls	1 – 2	Hiroshi Shibakusa	Pete Munro	Kuo Yung-chih	2,543
4 / 15	@ Sinon Bulls	0 – 5	Yang Chien-fu	Chang Chih-chiang		3,017
4 / 19	Sinon Bulls	4 – 3	Pan Wei-lun	Alfredo Gonzalez	Lin Cheng-feng	1,195
4 / 20	Sinon Bulls	0 – 2	Yang Chien-fu	Pete Munro	Kuo Yung-chih	2,173
4 / 21	Chinatrust Whales	7 – 1	Rob Cordemans	Tseng Chao-hao		2,048
4 / 22	Chinatrust Whales	20 – 5	Tsao Chun-yang	Kao Chien-san		2,077
4 / 26	Brother Elephants	1 – 0	Pete Munro	Wang Chin-li		2,543
4 / 27	Brother Elephants	9 – 12	Liu Chun-nan	Rob Cordemans	Chuang Wei-chuan	3,265
4 / 28	Sinon Bulls	1 – 13	Tomokazu Iba	Jeriome Robertson		3,026
4 / 29	Sinon Bulls	4 – 2	Pan Wei-lun	Lee Kuo-ching	Pan Chun-jung	3,062

May

Date	Opponent	Score	Win	Loss	Save	Attend.
5 / 3	@ Macoto Cobras	5 – 2	Tsao Chun-yang	Lee Min-chin	Kao Lung-wei	1,233
5 / 4	@ Macoto Cobras	4 – 10	Chang Hsien-chih	Jeriome Robertson		1,167
5 / 10	La New Bears	5 – 1	Pan Wei-lun	Luis Martinez		2,004
5 / 11	La New Bears	7 – 2	Pete Munro	Gary Rath		2,057
5 / 12	Brother Elephants	6 – 13	Liu Chun-nan	Rob Cordemans		4,117
5 / 13	Brother Elephants	6 – 5	Tsao Chun-yang	Chuang Wei-chuan		5,079
5 / 15	@ Macoto Cobras	11 – 7	Pan Chun-jung	Lee Min-chin		858
5 / 16	@ Macoto Cobras	19 – 6	Pan Wei-lun	Chang Hsien-chih		938
5 / 17	@ Chinatrust Whales	3 – 2	Tsao Chun-yang	Ni Fu-deh	Shen Po-tsang	608
5 / 18	@ Chinatrust Whales	Postponed Rescheduled for June 21				
5 / 22	@ Sinon Bulls	Postponed Rescheduled for June 22				
5 / 23	@ Sinon Bulls	Postponed Rescheduled for June 24				
5 / 24	@ La New Bears	10 – 2	Pete Munro	Hsu Wen-hsiung		2,094
5 / 25	@ La New Bears	3 – 0	Pan Wei-lun	Luis Martinez	Rob Cordemans	3,776
5 / 31	Chinatrust Whales	5 – 1	Pete Munro	Lorenzo Barceló		1,111

June

Date	Opponent	Score	Win	Loss	Save	Attend.
6 / 1	Chinatrust Whales	9 – 6	Pan Wei-lun	Chris Mowday	Tsao Chun-yang	1,662
6 / 5	@ La New Bears	Postponed Rescheduled for June 7				
6 / 6	@ La New Bears	8 – 14	Hsu Yu-wei	Pete Munro		2,138
6 / 7	@ La New Bears	Postponed Rescheduled for June 23				
6 / 9	Macoto Cobras	20 – 3	Pan Wei-lun	José Rodríguez		1,487
6 / 10	Macoto Cobras	0 – 2	Jeremy Hill	Wayne Franklin	Andy Van Hekken	2,221
6 / 12	@ Brother Elephants	Postponed Rescheduled for June 26				
6 / 13	@ Brother Elephants	0 – 3	Joey Dawley	Pete Munro	Todd Moser	2,041
6 / 16	@ Sinon Bulls	2 – 5	Yusuke Kurita	Wayne Franklin	Alfredo Gonzalez	3,545
6 / 17	@ Sinon Bulls	6 – 1	Pan Wei-lun	Yang Chien-fu		2,303
6 / 19	Brother Elephants	2 – 5	Todd Moser	Pan Chun-jung	Wang Chin-li	2,531
6 / 21	@ Chinatrust Whales	2 – 1	Wayne Franklin	Ni Fu-deh	Tsao Chun-yang	409
6 / 22	@ Sinon Bulls	3 – 2	Chang Chih-chiang	Lee Kuo-ching	Tsao Chun-yang	1,420
6 / 23	@ La New Bears	8 – 5	Lin Cheng-feng	Gary Rath		1,315
6 / 24	@ Sinon Bulls	11 – 2	Pete Munro	Yusuke Kurita	Yen Chun-hao	1,344
6 / 26	@ Brother Elephants	Postponed Rescheduled for June 28				
6 / 28	@ Brother Elephants	10 – 3	Shen Po-tsang	Wang Chin-li		1,029
6 / 29	Brother Elephants	9 – 2	Pete Munro	Nick Bierbrodt		2,575
6 / 30	Chinatrust Whales	8 – 9	Kevin Tolar	Tsao Chun-yang		1,689

July

Date	Opponent	Score	Win	Loss	Save	Attend.
7 / 1	Chinatrust Whales	9 – 9				2,006
7 / 3	@ La New Bears	9 – 2	Pan Wei-lun	Randy Leek		1,899
7 / 4	@ La New Bears	5 – 6	Tsai Ying-feng	Shen Po-tsang		1,749
7 / 5	@ Chinatrust Whales	5 – 8	Shen Yu-chieh	Chang Chih-chiang	Kevin Tolar	488
7 / 6	@ Chinatrust Whales	6 – 1	Brian Reith	Ni Fu-deh		840
7 / 10	Macoto Cobras	13 – 4	Pete Munro	Jeremy Hill		1,606
7 / 11	Macoto Cobras	2 – 1	Pan Wei-lun	Pat Ahearne	Tsao Chun-yang	2,006
7 / 14	@ Brother Elephants	3 – 0	Brian Reith	Liu Chun-nan	Tsao Chun-yang	3,626
7 / 15	@ Brother Elephants	9 – 2	Pete Munro	Yeh Yung-chieh		3,029
7 / 19	Brother Elephants	9 – 4	Brian Reith	Joey Dawley		2,621
7 / 24	Sinon Bulls	4 – 2	Pete Munro	Tomokazu Iba		1,121
7 / 25	Sinon Bulls	11 – 4	Pan Wei-lun	Yusuke Kurita		1,702
7 / 28	@ Macoto Cobras	9 – 6	Brian Reith	Chang Hsien-chih	Tsao Chun-yang	2,078
7 / 29	@ Macoto Cobras	2 – 3	Jeremy Hill	Tseng Yi-cheng		2,038
7 / 31	@ Chinatrust Whales	3 – 4	Kevin Tolar	Tsao Chun-yang		879

August

Date	Opponent	Score	Win	Loss	Save	Attend.
8 / 1	@ Chinatrust Whales	8 – 5	Chang Chih-chiang	Ni Fu-deh	Tsao Chun-yang	712
8 / 2	@ Sinon Bulls	7 – 1	Brian Reith	Yang Chien-fu		1,957
8 / 3	@ Sinon Bulls	6 – 0	Pete Munro	Tsai Chung-nan		1,988
8 / 7	@ Sinon Bulls	17 – 6	Lin Cheng-feng	Yang Chien-fu	Tsai Shih-chin	1,258
8 / 8	@ Sinon Bulls	8 – 2	Brian Reith	Tsai Chung-nan		1,515
8 / 9	@ Brother Elephants	Postponed Rescheduled for October 2				
8 / 10	@ Brother Elephants	Postponed Rescheduled for October 3				
8 / 16	Macoto Cobras	5 – 6	Travis Minix	Tsao Chun-yang		1,450
8 / 17	Macoto Cobras	Postponed Rescheduled for October 5				
8 / 18	La New Bears	Postponed Rescheduled for October 8				
8 / 19	La New Bears	Postponed Rescheduled for October 10				
8 / 21	@ Brother Elephants	Postponed Rescheduled for September 14				
8 / 22	@ Brother Elephants	Postponed Rescheduled for September 28				
8 / 23	@ La New Bears	13 – 7	Brian Reith	Gary Rath		1,030
8 / 24	@ La New Bears	Postponed Rescheduled for October 9				
8 / 30	Chinatrust Whales	5 – 0	Pete Munro	Ni Fu-deh		1,134
8 / 31	Chinatrust Whales	1 – 3	Shen Yu-chieh	Chang Chih-chiang	Kevin Tolar	1,145

September

Date	Opponent	Score	Win	Loss	Save	Attend.
9 / 1	Macoto Cobras	1 – 6	Chang Hsien-chi	Brian Reith		2,065
9 / 2	Macoto Cobras	10 – 1	Pan Wei-lun	Andy Van Hekken		2,033
9 / 6	La New Bears	1 – 3	Hsu Yu-wei	Pete Munro	Mac Suzuki	1,522
9 / 7	La New Bears	1 – 2	Mac Suzuki	Tsao Chun-yang		2,008
9 / 8	Sinon Bulls	0 – 5	Yusuke Kurita	Chang Chih-chiang		2,323
9 / 9	Sinon Bulls	18 – 4	Pan Wei-lun	Hu Chun-chieh		2,554
9 / 11	La New Bears	5 – 1	Pete Munro	Huang Chun-chung		1,521
9 / 12	La New Bears	8 – 11	Mac Suzuki	Tsao Chun-yang		1,564
9 / 14	@ Brother Elephants	10 – 1	Chang Chih-chiang	Liu Chun-nan		1,284
9 / 15	@ Macoto Cobras	17 – 12	Nelson Figueroa	Carlos Castillo		1,377
9 / 16	@ Macoto Cobras	4 – 1	Pete Munro	Lee Min-chin	Tsao Chun-yang	1,155
9 / 20	Brother Elephants	15 – 3	Nelson Figueroa	Yeh Yung-chieh		1,225
9 / 21	Brother Elephants	3 – 0	Pan Wei-lun	Wu Pao-hsien		2,139
9 / 25	Sinon Bulls	11 – 3	Pete Munro	Alfredo Gonzalez		1,691
9 / 26	Sinon Bulls	6 – 4	Nelson Figueroa	Yusuke Kurita		1,270
9 / 28	@ Brother Elephatns	3 – 5	Wu Pao-hsien	Chang Chih-chiang	Todd Moser	1,721
9 / 29	@ Chinatrust Whales	5 – 6	Lorenzo Barceló	Tsao Chun-yang		1,178
9 / 30	@ Chinatrust Whales	1 – 0	Ni Fu-deh	Pete Munro		1,249

October

Date	Opponent	Score	Win	Loss	Save	Attend.
10 / 2	@ Brother Elephants	8 – 2	Nelson Figueroa	Joey Dawley		1,388
10 / 3	@ Brother Elephants	3 – 7	Chuang Wei-chuan	Brian Reith	Todd Moser	2,061
10 / 5	Macoto Cobras	12 – 11	Pan Chun-jung	Andy Van Hekken	Tsai Shih-chin	1,068
10 / 8	La New Bears	10 – 2	Pan Wei-lun	Hsu Yu-wei		1,548
10 / 9	@ La New Bears	4 – 15	Andrew Lorraine	Pete Munro		3,073
10 / 10	La New Bears	1 – 4	Huang Chun-chung	Brian Reith	Mac Suzuki	6,263

== See also ==
2007 Chinese Professional Baseball League season
