= 2007 CPBL playoffs =

The Chinese Professional Baseball League (CPBL) playoffs included the three top teams from the regular season and saw Uni-President Lions crowned as the champion with the Taiwan Series through the month of October, 2007. The winner represented Taiwan in the Konami Cup in Japan with the champions from Japan, South Korea, and an allstar team from China to determine an Asian champion in November.

== Participants ==
- First Seed - La New Bears - Winner of the second half of the season. It is their second appearance in the playoff, and the second consecutive appearance. They defeated the Lions in last season's Taiwan Series four games to zero.
- Second Seed - Macoto Cobras - Winners of the first half of the season. It is their second appearance; the last time was 2005, in which they defeated the Lions three games to one, but were defeated by Sinon Bulls four games to zero.
- Third Seed - Uni-President Lions - Wildcard winner by placing first in the overall standing of the season. It is their 11th appearance in the playoffs, and the fourth consecutive appearance since the 2004 season. They were defeated by Sinon Bulls four games to three in 2004 Taiwan Series, eliminated by Macoto Cobras three games to one in 2005 playoffs, and defeated by La New Bears four games to zero in 2006 Taiwan Series.

== Rules ==
All participating teams are allowed to register 28 players on their roster, contrary to 25 in the regular season. The winner of first round is allowed to change its roster before advancing to Taiwan Series. There will be no tie games, meaning the game would continue if a winner could not be decided. All other aspects that are not described above would be the same as the rules in regular season.

== First round ==
In the first round of competition, the Uni-President Lions defeated the Macoto Cobras in 3 games to 0, going on to the Taiwan Series.

=== Game 1, October 12 ===
Hsinjuang Baseball Stadium, Hsinchuang, Taipei County

Team	1	2	3	4	5	6	7	8	9	R	H	E
Uni-President Lions	0	0	4	0	2	0	2	1	0	9	13	1
Macoto Cobras	0	2	0	0	0	0	0	0	2	4	8	4

WP: Nelson Figueroa (1-0) LP: Chang Hsien-chih (張賢智) (0-1)
HRs: Uni-President - Tilson Brito (1); Macoto - Teng Shi-yang (鄧蒔陽) (1), Huang Shi-hao (黃仕豪) (1)
MVP of the Game: Nelson Figueroa (SP) (8.0IP, 6H, 8K, 2BB, 2ER)
Attendance: 2,287

=== Game 2, October 13 ===
Hsinjuang Baseball Stadium, Hsinchuang, Taipei County

Team	1	2	3	4	5	6	7	8	9	R	H	E
Uni-President Lions	0	0	0	10	2	2	0	0	0	14	14	0
Macoto Cobras	0	0	0	0	0	0	0	0	0	0	7	1

WP: Pete Munro (1-0) LP: Hsu Chu-chien (許竹見) (0-1)
HRs: Uni-President - Tilson Brito (2)
MVP of the Game: Tilson Brito (3B) (5-2, 1HR, 2R, 4RBI)
Attendance: 4,293

=== Game 3, October 14 ===
Tainan Municipal Baseball Stadium, Tainan City

Team	1	2	3	4	5	6	7	8	9	R	H	E
Macoto Cobras	0	0	0	1	0	1	0	0	0	2	8	4
Uni-President Lions	0	0	2	0	3	5	0	3	X	13	16	1

WP: Pan Wei-lun (潘威倫) (1-0) LP: Andy Van Hekken (0-1)
HRs: Macoto - Hsieh Chia-hsien (謝佳賢) (1); Uni-President - Kao Kuo-ching (高國慶) (1), Chen Lien-hung (陳連宏) (1), Kuo Dai-chi (郭岱琦) (1)
MVP of the Game: Kao Kuo-ching (高國慶) (1B) (4-3, 1HR, 2R, 5RBI)
Attendance: 4,081

== Taiwan Series ==
In the 2007 Taiwan Series, the Uni-President Lions defeated the La New Bears in 4 games to 3.

Awards:

- Taiwan Series MVP: Nelson Figueroa (SP) (3-0, 23.0 IP, 21H, 3BB, 25K, 4ER)
- Outstanding Player Award: Uni-President - Liu Fu-hao (劉芙豪); La New - Chen Chin-feng (陳金鋒)
- Manager of the Year: Lu Wen-sheng (呂文生)

=== Game 1, October 20 ===
Chengching Lake Baseball Field, Niaosong, Kaohsiung County

Team	1	2	3	4	5	6	7	8	9	R	H	E
Uni-President Lions	0	0	0	1	0	5	0	0	4	10	14	0
La New Bears	0	0	0	0	0	2	0	0	0	2	7	3

WP: Nelson Figueroa (1-0) LP: Huang Chun-chung (黃俊中) (0-1)
HRs: Uni-President - Kuo Dai-chi (郭岱琦) (1); La New - Kit Pellow (1)
MVP of the Game: Yang Sung-hsien (楊松弦) (CF) (4-3, 1R, 3RBI)
Attendance: 11,334

=== Game 2, October 21 ===
Chengching Lake Baseball Field, Niaosong, Kaohsiung County

Team	1	2	3	4	5	6	7	8	9	R	H	E
Uni-President Lions	0	0	0	2	3	0	0	0	2	7	13	0
La New Bears	2	0	0	0	0	1	0	0	0	3	10	1

WP: Pete Munro (1-0) LP: Hsu Yu-wei (徐余偉) (0-1) SV: Tseng Yi-cheng (曾翊誠) (1)
HRs: Uni-President - Pan Wu-hsiung (潘武雄) (1) (2), Kuo Dai-chi (郭岱琦) (2); La New - Chen Chin-Feng (陳金鋒) (1)
MVP of the Game: Pan Wu-hsiung (潘武雄) (CF) (5-4, 2HR, 2R, 5RBI)
Attendance: 8,864

=== Game 3, October 23 ===
Tainan Municipal Baseball Stadium, Tainan

Team	1	2	3	4	5	6	7	8	9	R	H	E
La New Bears	0	1	0	1	0	1	4	0	0	7	12	0
Uni-President Lions	0	2	0	0	0	0	1	3	0	6	14	1

WP: Andrew Lorraine (1-0) LP: Pan Wei-lun (潘威倫) (0-1) SV: Mac Suzuki (1)
HRs: La New - Chiang Chih-Tsung (蔣智聰) (1); Uni-President - Liu Fu-hao (劉芙豪) (1)
MVP of the Game: Chiang Chih-Tsung (2B) (5-3, 2H, 1R, 3RBI)
Attendance: 5,263

=== Game 4, October 24 ===
Tainan Municipal Baseball Stadium, Tainan

Team	1	2	3	4	5	6	7	8	9	R	H	E
La New Bears	1	0	0	0	0	0	0	3	0	4	12	2
Uni-President Lions	4	0	0	0	5	0	0	2	X	11	9	2

WP: Nelson Figueroa (2-0) LP: Hsu Wen-hsiung (許文雄) (0-1)
HRs: La New - Kit Pellow (2); Uni-President - Kao Kuo-ching (高國慶) (1)
MVP of the Game: Nelson Figueroa (SP) (7.0 IP, 9H, 9K, 1BB, 1ER)
Attendance: 7,063

=== Game 5, October 25 ===
Tainan Municipal Baseball Stadium, Tainan

Team	1	2	3	4	5	6	7	8	9	R	H	E
La New Bears	0	0	1	2	0	1	0	2	2	8	8	0
Uni-President Lions	0	0	0	3	1	1	0	0	0	5	12	2

WP: Mac Suzuki (1-0) LP: Tseng Yi-cheng(曾翊誠) (0-1)
HRs: La New - Huang Lung-Yi (黃龍義) (1), Tsai Chien-Wei (蔡建偉) (1), Lin Chih-Sheng (林智勝) (1), Chen Chin-Feng (陳金鋒) (2); Uni-President - Liu Fu-hao (劉芙豪) (2), Yang Po-chaio (楊博超) (1)
MVP of the Game: Mac Suzuki (RP) (5.1 IP, 7H, 6K, 2BB, 2ER)
Attendance: 10,056

=== Game 6, October 27 ===
Chengching Lake Baseball Field, Niaosong, Kaohsiung County

Team	1	2	3	4	5	6	7	8	9	R	H	E
Uni-President Lions	0	2	0	0	1	1	1	0	0	5	8	0
La New Bears	3	0	0	1	2	0	0	0	X	6	11	1

WP: Hau Yu-wei (徐余偉) (1-1) LP: Pan Wei-lun (潘威倫) (0-2) SV: Hsu Wen-hsiung (許文雄) (1)
HRs: Uni-President - Liu Fu-hao (劉芙豪) (3), Tilson Brito (1) (2); La New - Chen Chin-feng (陳金鋒) (3) (4)
MVP of the Game: Chen Chin-feng (陳金鋒) (DH) (4-2, 2HR, 5RBI, 2R)
Attendance: 18,656

=== Game 7, October 28 ===
Chengching Lake Baseball Field, Niaosong, Kaohsiung County

Team	1	2	3	4	5	6	7	8	9	R	H	E
Uni-President Lions	0	0	0	3	0	0	1	0	0	4	9	0
La New Bears	0	0	0	0	0	1	0	0	1	2	5	2

WP: Nelson Figueroa (3-0) LP: Andrew Lorraine (1-1)
HRs: La New - Lin Chih-Sheng (林智勝) (2)
MVP of the Game: Nelson Figueroa (SP) (9.0 IP, 5H, 1HR, 8K, 1BB, 2ER)
Attendance: 20,000
