= 2007 CPBL season =

The 2007 Chinese Professional Baseball League (CPBL) season began on March 17 in Kaohsiung County when the defending champion La New Bears played host to the Uni-President Lions. The season concluded in late October with the Uni-President Lions defeating the La New Bears in Game 7 of the Taiwan Series.

== Competition ==
Six teams, the La New Bears, Uni-President Lions, Sinon Bulls, Chinatrust Whales, Brother Elephants and Macoto Cobras will contested the CPBL, the highest level of professional baseball played in Taiwan. The season is divided into two halves, with each team playing fifty games in each half. The winners for each half-season plus the non-winner with the best overall record qualified for the playoffs. In the event that the same team wins both halves, the next two teams with the best overall records advance.

== Standings ==
=== First half standings ===
Team	G	W	T	L	Pct.	GB
Macoto Cobras	50	28	1	21	.571	--
Uni-President Lions	50	27	0	23	.540	1.5
La New Bears	50	26	0	24	.520	2.5
Sinon Bulls	50	24	1	25	.490	4.0
Brother Elephants	50	24	1	25	.490	4.0
Chinatrust Whales	50	19	1	30	.388	9.0

- Macoto Cobras win the first half and advance to the 2007 Chinese Professional Baseball League playoffs.

=== Second half standings ===
Team	G	W	T	L	Pct.	GB
La New Bears	50	32	0	18	.640	--
Uni-President Lions	50	31	1	18	.633	0.5
Chinatrust Whales	50	27	1	19	.551	4.5
Brother Elephants	50	25	0	25	.500	7.0
Sinon Bulls	50	18	0	32	.360	14.0
Macoto Cobras	50	16	0	34	.320	16.0

- La New Bears win the second half and advance to the 2007 Chinese Professional Baseball League playoffs.

=== Overall standings ===
The team among the non-half-season-winners with the best overall record will gain the wild card spot and the third seed in the playoffs.

Team	G	W	T	L	Pct.	GB	RS	RA
Uni-President Lions	100	58	1	41	.586	--	614	442
La New Bears	100	58	0	42	.580	0.5	474	443
Brother Elephants	100	49	1	50	.495	9.0	480	535
Chinatrust Whales	100	46	2	52	.469	11.5	446	491
Macoto Cobras	100	44	1	55	.444	14.0	561	588
Sinon Bulls	100	42	1	57	.424	16.0	466	545

- Green denotes first half or second half champion.
- Yellow denotes wild card position.

== Statistical leaders ==
=== Hitting ===
Stat	Player	Team	Total
HR	Tilson Brito*	Uni-President Lions	33
AVG	Chen Chin-feng	La New Bears	0.382
H	Kao Kuo-ching*	Uni-President Lions	152
RBIs	Tilson Brito	Uni-President Lions	107
SB	Huang Lung-yi	La New Bears	27

=== Pitching ===
Stat	Player	Team	Total
W	Pan Wei-lun	Uni-President Lions	16
ERA	Peter Munro	Uni-President Lions	2.03
SO	Joe Dawley	Brother Elephants	153
SV	Todd Moser	Brother Elephants	13
Hld	Wang Ching-li	Brother Elephants	12

== Month MVP ==
Month	Item	Player	Team
March	Pitcher	Huang Chun-chung	La New Bears
	Hitter	Peng Cheng-min	Brother Elephants
April	Pitcher	Iba Tomokazu	Sinon Bulls
	Hitter	Peng Cheng-min	Brother Elephants
May	Pitcher	Pan Wei-lun	Uni-President Lions
	Hitter	Kao Kuo-ching	Uni-President Lions
June	Pitcher	Jeremy Hill	Macoto Cobras
	Hitter	Tilson Brito	Uni-President Lions
July	Pitcher	Peter Munro	Uni-President Lions
	Hitter	Yang Sen	Uni-President Lions
August	Pitcher	Shen Yu-chieh	Chinatrust Whales
	Hitter	Chen Chin-feng	La New Bears
September	Pitcher	Pan Wei-lun	Uni-President Lions
	Hitter	Carlos Villalobos	Chinatrust Whales
October	Pitcher	Huang Chun-chung	La New Bears
	Hitter	Kao Kuo-ching	Uni-President Lions

== Milestones ==
- March 22 - Huang Chung-Yi of the Sinon Bulls records his 1500th career base hit against the Macoto Cobras.
- March 24 - Chang Tai-Shan plays in his 1000th career game against the Brother Elephants
- October 3 - Kao Kuo-ching hits the 144th hit against the Brother Elephants right-hander Yeh Yong-chieh and records the most hits in a single season currently.

== Postseason ==
1st Round			Taiwan Series
			1	La New Bears	3
2	Macoto Cobras	0	3	Uni-President Lions	4
3	Uni-President Lions	3

- Uni-President Lions wins the 2007 Taiwan Series.
  - Taiwan Series Most Valuable Player:
- (United States) Nelson Figueroa(Uni-President)
  - Taiwan Series Outstanding Player:
- (Taiwan) Chin-Feng Chen(La New),
- (Taiwan) Liu Fu-hao(Uni-President)

== See also ==
- 2007 Chinese Professional Baseball League playoffs
