= List of CPBL holds champions =

Since 2005, the Chinese Professional Baseball League (CPBL) recognizes hold champions in each season. Because of the nature of a hold, the award is typically awarded to middle relievers or setup pitchers. If players' holds are equal, the player with the better ERA statistic is awarded.

== Champions ==
Year	Player	Team	Holds
2005	(Taiwan) Tseng Yi-cheng(曾翊誠)	Uni-President Lions	11
2006	(Taiwan) Lee Ming-jin(李明進)	Macoto Cobras	18
2007	(Taiwan) Wang Jing-li(王勁力)	Brother Elephants	12
2008	(Taiwan) Shen Po-tsang(沈柏蒼)	Uni-President 7-Eleven Lions	14
2009	(United States) Matt Perisho(麥特M.P.)	Brother Elephants	23
2010	(Taiwan) Tseng Chao-hao(曾兆豪)	Lamigo Monkeys	25
2011	(Taiwan) Kao Jian-san(高建三)	Uni-President 7-Eleven Lions	26
2012	(Taiwan) Kao Jian-san(高建三)	Uni-President 7-Eleven Lions	20
2013	(Japan) Hiroki Sanada(真田 裕貴)	Brother Elephants	32
2014	(Taiwan) Chen Yu-Hsun(陳禹勳)	Lamigo Monkeys	30
2015	(Taiwan) Kuan Ta-Yuan(官大元)	Chinatrust Brothers	19
2016	(Taiwan) Lai Hung-Cheng(賴鴻誠)	EDA Rhinos	18
2017	(Taiwan) Wang Yao-lin(王躍霖)	Lamigo Monkeys	19
2018	(Taiwan) Chiu Hao-Chun(邱浩鈞)	Uni-President 7-Eleven Lions	23
2019	(Taiwan) Huang Tzu-peng(黃子鵬)	Lamigo Monkeys	23
2020	(Taiwan) Wu Chun-Wei(吳俊偉)	CTBC Brothers	24
2021	(Taiwan) Wu Chun-Wei(吳俊偉)	CTBC Brothers	27
2022	(Taiwan) Chen Yu-Hsun(陳禹勳)	Rakuten Monkeys	26
2023	(Taiwan) Wu Chun-Wei (吳俊偉)	CTBC Brothers	26
2024	(Taiwan) Wang Chih-Hsuan (王志烜)	Rakuten Monkeys	31
2025	(Japan) Masaki Takashio (髙塩將樹)	Uni-President 7-Eleven Lions	25
2026	(Japan) Masaki Takashio (髙塩將樹)	Uni-President 7-Eleven Lions	25
