= Yang Nien-hsi =

Taiwanese baseball player (born 2006)

San Francisco Giants
- Pitcher
- Born: August 10, 2006 (age 18); Tainan, Taiwan
- Bats: Left Throws: Right
Medals
Representing Chinese Taipei
Men's baseball
U-18 Asian Baseball Championship
Gold medal – first place	2024 Taiwan	Team

Yang Nien-hsi
- Chinese: 陽念希
Transcriptions
Standard Mandarin
- Wade–Giles: Yang^{2} Nien^{4}-Hsi^{1}

Yang Nien-hsi (Chinese: 陽念希; Wade–Giles: Yang^{2} Nien^{4}-Hsi^{1}; born 10 August 2006) is a Taiwanese professional baseball player who is a pitcher in the San Francisco Giants organization.

== Life and career ==
Yang was born in Tainan, Taiwan, and is of Amis descent. His father is former Uni-President Lions shortstop Yang Tung-yi. He attended Jen-Hua Junior High School in Hualien County, where his father was the baseball coach. As a student at Pingjen Senior High School in Taoyuan, Yang was selected to play on the Taiwanese national team in the 2022 and 2023 U-18 Baseball World Cups. In the 2022 tournament, he pitched against the United States, recording a complete game win. In that game, he gave up two earned runs to Bryce Eldridge, who would later become a top prospect in the Giants organization.

In 2024, Yang was again selected to play on the national team. He was the starting pitcher in the final game of the U-18 Asian Baseball Championship against Team Japan. He gave up 5 hits over 2.2 innings, recording 3 strikeouts and 1 earned run. The team went on to win the game. After graduating high school, he attended and pitched for the University of Taipei, competing in the University Baseball League for part of a season.

On 14 December 2024, Yang confirmed he signed a minor league contract with the San Francisco Giants organization of Major League Baseball for US$500,000. The Giants' Pacific Rim Area scout presented Yang with a Giants jersey at a press event in January 2025, where Yang revealed that fellow Taiwanese player Wei-En Lin had encouraged Yang to join him at the Oakland Athletics. At the time of his signing, Yang joined two other Taiwanese prospects in the Giants system, Kai-Wei Teng and Chen-Hsun Lee. He was the first player from the University of Taipei to sign with an MLB team since C. C. Lee in 2008.
