= Hsu Feng-pin =

Taiwanese baseball player

Uni-President Lions – No. 51
- Center field
- Bats: Both Throws: Right

CPBL debut
- April 9, 2006, for the Uni-President Lions

Career statistics (through 2008)
- Games: 105
- Batting average: 0.233
- Hits: 38
- Home runs: 0
- RBIs: 14
- Stolen bases: 18
- Stats at Baseball Reference

Hsu Feng-pin (Chinese: 許峰賓; pinyin: Xǔ Fēngbīn; born 10 October 1981) is a Taiwanese baseball player who currently plays for Uni-President Lions of Chinese Professional Baseball League. Although originally an outfielder, he occasionally played as second baseman for the Lions.
