= Chang Chih-chiang =

Taiwanese baseball player

Uni-President Lions – No. 33
- Starting pitcher
- Born: October 22, 1978 (age 47); Taiwan
- Bats: Right Throws: Right

debut
- September 21, 2003, for the Uni-President Lions

Career statistics (through June 3, 2008)
- Record: 11-16
- Saves: 2
- Holds: 3
- ERA: 4.172
- Strikeouts: 180

Teams
- Uni-President Lions / Uni-President 7-Eleven Lions / Uni-President Lions (2003–present)

Chang Chih-chiang (Chinese: 張志強; pinyin: Zhāng Zhìqiáng, born 22 October 1978 in Taiwan) is a Taiwanese baseball pitcher for Uni-President Lions of Chinese Professional Baseball League (CPBL). He got his first career win on 7 July 2005. He is a starting pitcher for the Lions. Because of his resemblance to Kuo Yuen-chih, a famous Taiwanese baseball player who had a successful baseball career in Japan before retiring, he was assigned the number 33, the same number Kuo wore during almost his entire career. He is nicknamed by fans as Ban-chang (Chinese: 班長, literally "squad leader") due to his experience in the army. Teammate Wang Tzu-sung also served in his squad while in the army.

== Career statistics ==
Year	Team	G	W	L	SV	H	IP	K	BB	HR	ERA
2003	Uni-President	3	0	0	1	0	5.0	3	4	0	1.800
2004	Uni-President	8	0	0	0	0	7.2	6	3	0	3.552
2005	Uni-President	18	3	6	0	1	55.2	48	28	4	4.365
2006	Uni-President	24	0	3	0	1	52.1	43	30	1	5.159
2007	Uni-President	22	3	5	0	0	78.2	47	46	6	5.263
2008	Uni-President	12	5	2	1	1	66.0	33	17	1	2.182
Total		87	11	16	2	3	265.1	180	128	12	4.172

Last updated June 3, 2008

== See also ==
- Chinese Professional Baseball League
- Uni-President Lions
