= Wu Chia-jung =

Taiwanese baseball coach

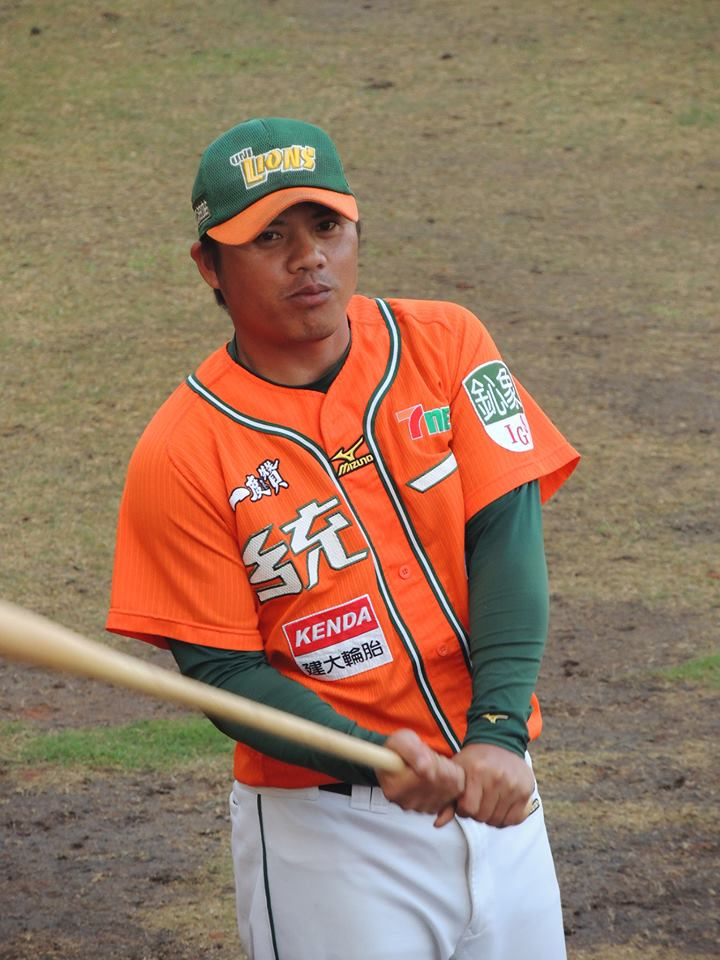
- Center field
- Born: 19 November 1977 (age 48)
- Bats: Right Throws: Right

debut
- June 3, 1999, for the Uni-President Lions

Career statistics (through 2006)
- Games: 640
- Batting average: 0.225
- Hits: 332
- Home runs: 3
- RBIs: 130
- Stolen bases: 120
- Stats at Baseball Reference

Teams
- Uni-President Lions (1999–2006)

Career highlights and awards
- Golden Glove Third Baseman - CPBL (2002-2004)

Wu Chia-jung (Chinese: 吳佳榮; pinyin: Wú Jiaróng; born 19 November 1977) is a Taiwanese baseball coach who currently coaches for Uni-President Lions of Chinese Professional Baseball League. He currently serves as baserunning coach for the Lions.

== See also ==
- Chinese Professional Baseball League
- Uni-President Lions
