= Yang Chien-fu =

Taiwanese baseball player

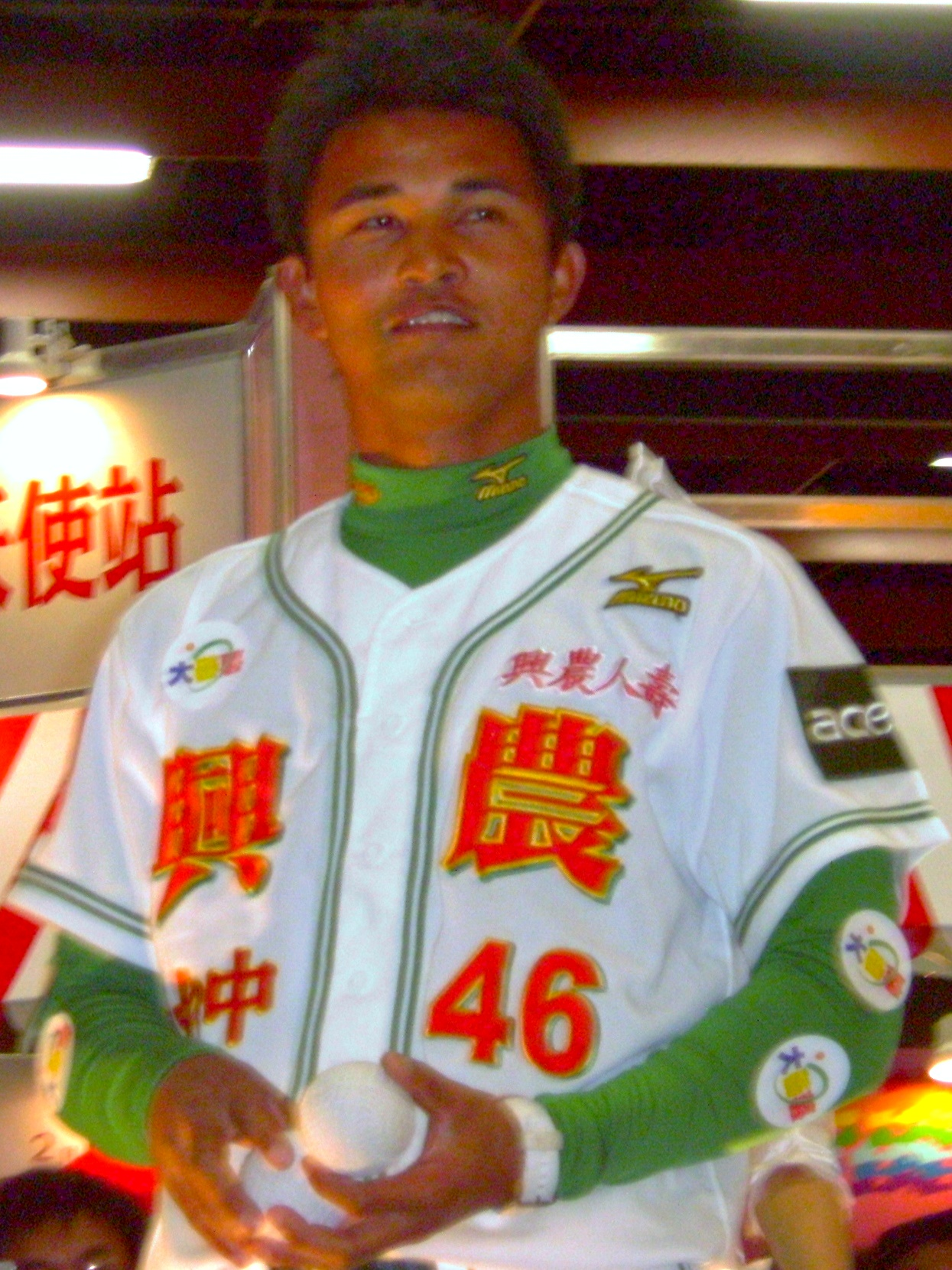
- Pitcher
- Born: April 22, 1979 (age 47); Taitung County, Taiwan
- Bats: Right Throws: Right

CPBL debut
- June 29, 2003, for the Sinon Bulls

CPBL statistics
- Win–loss record: 82–85
- Earned run average: 4.05
- Strikeouts: 843
- Stats at Baseball Reference

Teams
- Sinon Bulls / EDA Rhinos (2003–2015); Uni-President 7-Eleven Lions (2017–2018)

Yang Chien-fu
Medal record

Representing Chinese Taipei

Men's baseball

Baseball World Cup
Bronze medal – third place	2001 Taipei	Team

Intercontinental Cup
Bronze medal – third place	2006 Taichung	Team

Asian Games
Silver medal – second place	2010 Guangzhou	Team

Asian Baseball Championship
Gold medal – first place	2001 Taipei	Team
Bronze medal – third place	2007 Taichung	Team

Yang Chien-fu (Chinese: 陽建福; pinyin: Yáng Jiànfú; Wade–Giles: Yang^{2} Chien^{4} Fu^{2}; born 22 April 1979) is a Taiwanese former professional baseball pitcher.

== Career ==
After serving in the National Training Team in 2001 and 2002 he was drafted by the Sinon Bulls of the Chinese Professional Baseball League in early 2003 and stays at that club to date. Yang is well known for his slider and had a fastball speed up to 152 km/h (94 mph) in his heyday in 2004, as well as being a frequent member of the Taiwan national baseball team since 2001. However between 2005 and 2007 his elbow injury and the overall poor condition of the Sinon Bulls compromised his performance. He became a free agent at the end of 2011 season.

== Career statistics ==
Year	Team	Starts	Relief; App.	Complete; Games	Wins	Losses	Saves	IP	ERA
2003	Sinon Bulls	9	5	0	7	2	0	67.0	1.478
2004	Sinon Bulls	25	2	1	15	6	1	172.2	1.772
2005	Sinon Bulls	3	8	0	2	1	0	27.1	5.927
2006	Sinon Bulls	26	9	1	13	11	1	173.0	4.058
2007	Sinon Bulls	22	5	0	7	11	1	132.0	3.682

== See also ==
- Chinese Taipei at the 2004 Summer Olympics
- 2006 Intercontinental Cup
- Sinon Bulls
- 2007 CPBL season
