= UBLS =

UBLS may refer to:

- University of Botswana, Lesotho, and Swaziland
- Uniformly bounded linearly stationary
- United Bank Limited Pakistan's London Stock Exchange (international trading service) stock symbol

== See also ==
- UBL (disambiguation)
