= Wang Jing-li =

Taiwanese baseball player

Brother Elephants – No. 21
- Short relief
- Born: 7 September 1976 (age 49); Taiwan
- Bats: Right Throws: Right

CPBL debut
- 28 March, 1999, for the Brother Elephants

Career statistics (through 2008)
- Record: 40-40
- Holds: 16
- Saves: 36
- ERA: 3.91
- Strikeouts: 452
- Stats at Baseball Reference

Teams
- Brother Elephants (1999–present)

Wang Jing-li (Chinese: 王勁力; pinyin: Wáng Jìnlì; born 7 September 1976 in Taiwan) is a Taiwanese baseball player who currently plays for Brother Elephants of Chinese Professional Baseball League. He currently plays as short relief pitcher for the Elephants.

In 2007 CPBL season, he gained the Holds Championship Award.

In 2009, he was one of the players investigated in regards to a match-fixing scandal involving the Elephants.

== Career statistics ==
Season	Team	G	W	L	HD	SV	CG	SHO	BB	SO	ER	INN	ERA
1999	Brother Elephants	13	1	1	0	0	0	0	11	22	6	20.0	2.70
2000	Brother Elephants	21	0	6	0	1	0	0	21	35	28	63.2	3.96
2001	Brother Elephants	30	10	10	0	0	0	0	51	70	59	122.0	4.35
2002	Brother Elephants	28	11	6	0	0	3	1	77	76	75	156.1	4.32
2003	Brother Elephants	48	4	4	0	11	2	0	33	71	37	94.2	3.52
2004	Brother Elephants	54	4	7	0	14	0	0	32	66	28	88.1	2.85
2005	Brother Elephants	17	1	0	0	2	0	0	19	15	15	30.0	4.50
2006	Brother Elephants	24	3	1	3	2	0	0	11	22	12	34.0	3.18
2007	Brother Elephants	45	6	2	12	6	0	0	24	61	26	71.0	3.30
2008	Brother Elephants	10	0	3	1	0	0	0	11	14	16	15.0	9.39
Total	10 years	280	40	40	16	36	6	1	290	452	302	695.1	3.91

Preceded by Lee Ming-jin (李明進)	CPBL Hold Champion Award; 2007	Succeeded by Shen Po-tsang
