= Lin Cheng-feng =

Taiwanese baseball player

Fubon Guardians – No. 42
- Pitcher / Coach
- Born: 26 December 1982 (age 43); Penghu, Taiwan
- Batted: Right Threw: Right

CPBL debut
- March 22, 2006, for the Uni-President Lions

Last CPBL appearance
- July 23, 2016, for the Fubon Guardians

Career statistics
- Win–loss record: 22–23
- Earned run average: 4.49
- Strikeouts: 256
- Stats at Baseball Reference

Teams
- Uni-President Lions Uni-President 7-Eleven Lions (2006–2012); EDA Rhinos Fubon Guardians (2013–2016)

Lin Cheng-feng (Chinese: 林正豐; pinyin: Lín Zhèngfēng, born 26 December 1982) is a Taiwanese former professional baseball pitcher. He played in the Chinese Professional Baseball League (CPBL) for the Uni-President Lions and Fubon Guardians.

== Early life ==
Born in Penghu, Taiwan, Lin was adopted by his foster family, and adopted the family name Hsu as his surname. He later changed his surname to Lin, the family name of his biological family. He began to play baseball at junior level, and moved to Kaohsiung to attend Kaoyuan Vocational School (Chinese: 高苑工商), a secondary school with a long tradition in athletic development in Southern Taiwan. After graduating from Kauyuan, he joined Taiwan Cooperative Bank Baseball Team, an amateur baseball team in Taiwan's Class A amateur baseball league, before passing the alternative services examination and entered the draft.

== Professional career ==
Lin was drafted by Uni-President Lions in the second round of 2004's alternative service draft, and spent one year in the minor league as required by regulation. He made his debut on March 22, 2006, after fulfilling his one-year obligation in alternative service. His first win came on June 23, 2007. He started against La New Bears, and pitched five innings while walked six and gave up four hits, including a two-run home run by Huang Lung-Yi. His teammates supported him with eight runs, allowed him to become the second pitcher from Penghu to score a victory in the history of Chinese Professional Baseball League. In 2012, he was released by Uni-President Lions and later signed by EDA Rhinos.
