= Wang Tzu-sung =

Taiwanese baseball player

Uni-President Lions – No. 66
- Shortstop
- Bats: Right Throws: Right

CPBL debut
- 27 June, 2003, for the Uni-President Lions

Career statistics (through 2007)
- Games: 234
- Batting average: 0.187
- Hits: 87
- Home runs: 4
- RBIs: 47
- Stolen bases: 9
- Stats at Baseball Reference

Wang Tzu-sung (Chinese: 王子菘; pinyin: Wáng Zǐsōng; born 6 June 1978) is a Taiwanese baseball player who played for Uni-President Lions of Chinese Professional Baseball League. He retired in 2011 due to a shoulder injury and is now serving as the Lions' infield fielding coach.

== See also ==
- Chinese Professional Baseball League
- Uni-President Lions
