= Liu Fu-hao =

Taiwanese baseball player

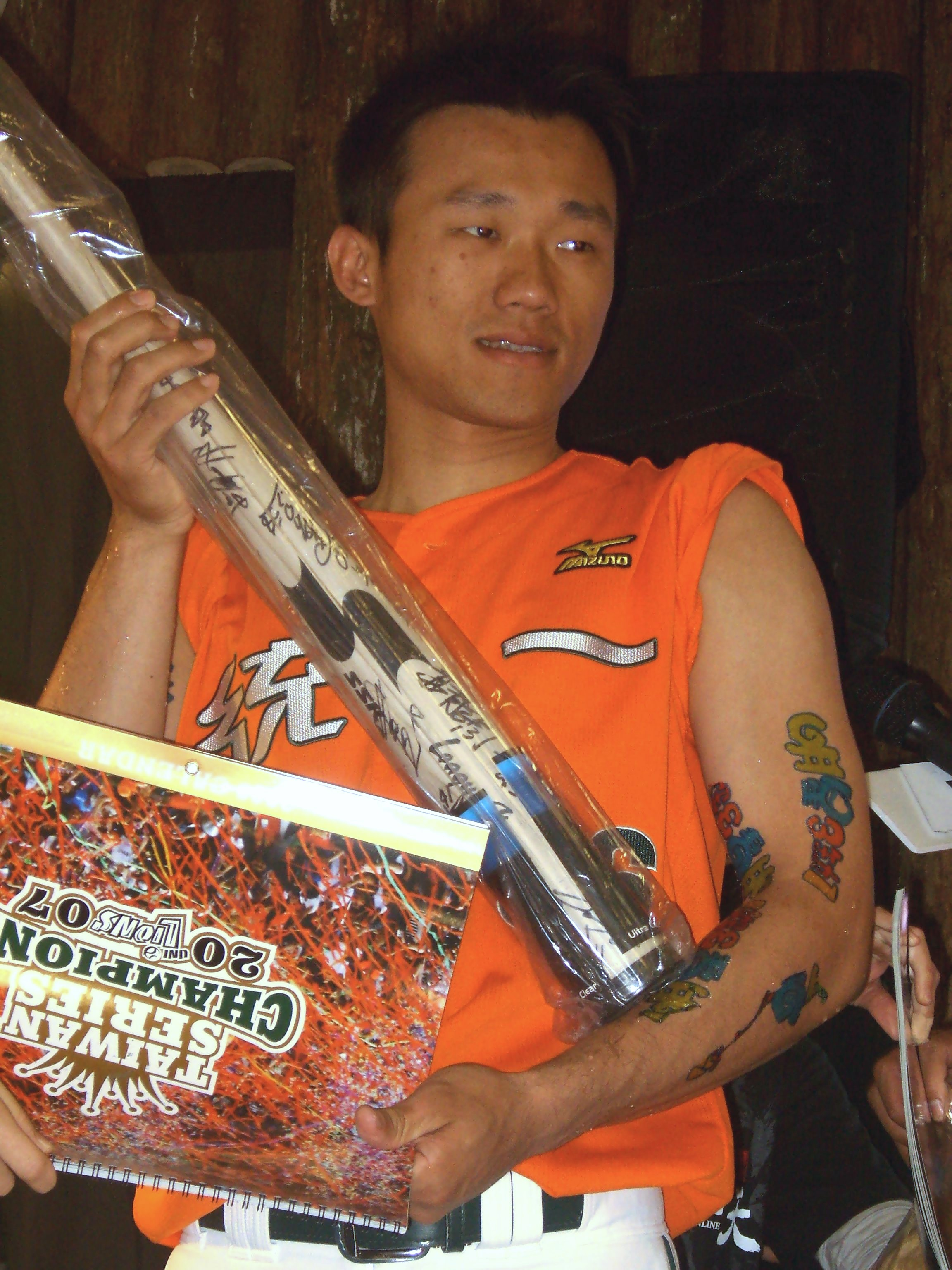

Uni-President Lions – No. 56
- Center field
- Bats: Right Throws: Right

CPBL debut
- March 3, 2004, for the Uni-President Lions

Career statistics (through 2018)
- Games: 1228
- Batting average: 0.276
- Hits: 1083
- Home runs: 109
- RBIs: 559
- Stolen bases: 126
- Stats at Baseball Reference

Teams
- Uni-President Lions (2004–2018)

Career highlights and awards
- 5x Taiwan Series champion (2007-2009, 2011, 2013); Golden Glove Outfielder - CPBL (2006~2011); Best Ten, Outfielder - CPBL (2006, 2007, 2010, 2011)

Liu Fu-hao (Chinese: 劉芙豪; pinyin: Liú Fúháo, nickname: 小破 Xiǎo Pò, born 14 November 1978) is a retired Taiwanese baseball player who played for Uni-President Lions of Chinese Professional Baseball League. Originally a third baseman, he played mostly as center fielder for the Lions, although he is capable of playing other outfield positions as well as first base.

== Early life ==
A native to the city of Taichung, Liu spent his youth by playing for a local elementary school baseball team. He moved to Taipei County (now New Taipei City) and attended the junior high department of Overseas Chinese Experimental Senior High School (Chinese: 華僑實驗高級中學), whose baseball team was sponsored by RSEA Engineering Corp (Chinese: 榮工公司). He later transferred to Hsikuen Junior High School (Chinese: 溪崑國民中學), a school also sponsored by RSEA, and attended Chunghua Senior High School (Chinese: 中華中學). After completing secondary education, he attended Taipei Physical Education College (Chinese: 台北體育學院), which is also sponsored by RSEA. After graduating from TPEC, he joined Taiwan Cooperative Bank Baseball Team. He was once invited to enter the CPBL draft by Brother Elephants, but later declined. He did, however, enter the draft in 2004.

== Professional career ==
He was drafted by Uni-President Lions in the first round, along with teammate Yang Tung-yi, who has been his teammate since middle school. He saw his first at-bat on March 3, 2004, and hit a home run. He is the first Taiwanese player to hit a home run on the first at-bat of career in the history of CPBL.

He won the first Gold Glove and the Best 10 Award in 2006.

In 2007, he was elected the Most Outstanding Player (of winning team) of Taiwan Series that he hit 3 homers in the Series. The MVP of this series is the pitcher that won 3 games, Nelson Figueroa.

He hit 3 home runs in 2008 Asia Series. The Game 6 of the series, Uni-President Lions defeated SK Wyverns by his 2 homers and entered the final. At last, Uni-President Lions were defeated by Saitama Seibu Lions, they finished runners-up.

In 2009, he hit 11 home runs this season. It is the first time that he hit more than 10 home runs in one season. The first Game of the championships this year, he hit 2-run homer in 4th bottom against Brother Elephants, the Lions won the game. He was elected the MVP in this game. The Lions won the series in Game 7 eventually, completed three-peat.

Next year, he batted .279 with 10 home runs, 59 RBIs, and 121 hits. He is on the top of Lions the year. In addition, he stole 31 bases. But he lost the stolen base champion because of the lower stolen base percentage. He won the Gold Glove five straight years, and the first Best 10 Award after 2007.

He was the main leadoff hitter of the Lions in 2011. He hit 13 homers as leadoff hitter, created a new record of local players. His five leadoff homers in this year are the most ones in single season in the history of CPBL.

== See also ==
- Chinese Professional Baseball League
- Uni-President Lions
