= Tsao Chun-yang =

Taiwanese baseball player

- Closer
- Born: 29 March 1976 (age 49); Tainan, Taiwan
- Bats: Right Throws: Right

CPBL debut
- March 9, 1999, for the Uni-President Lions

Career statistics (through 2008)
- Record: 27-29
- Saves: 28
- Holds: 7
- ERA: 3.03
- Strikeouts: 330

Teams
- Uni-President Lions (1999); Chunichi Dragons (2000–2002); Uni-President Lions (2003–2008); Brother Elephants (2008–2009)

Career highlights and awards
- CPBL MVP of the Year (1999); CPBL Rookie of the Year (1999)

Tsao Chun-yang (Chinese: 曹竣崵, born 29 March 1976 in Tainan, Taiwan) is a retired Taiwanese baseball player.

He is the only person in CPBL history to have won Rookie of the Year award and Most Valuable Player award in the same year, in the 1999 season. He was waived by the Uni-President Lions in the middle of 2008 season, and his contract was picked up by the Elephants.

== Career statistics ==
=== CPBL ===
Season	Team	G	W	L	HD	SV	CG	SHO	BB	SO	ER	INN	ERA
1999	Uni-President Lions	23	11	5	0	0	6	4	44	116	39	141.1	2.48
2003	Uni-President Lions	47	2	3	0	16	0	0	27	48	21	70.2	2.68
2004	Uni-President Lions	38	6	3	0	1	1	0	26	60	27	93.1	2.60
2005	Uni-President Lions	22	1	4	3	0	0	0	14	19	18	29.2	5.46
2006	Uni-President Lions	25	3	7	2	1	1	0	20	50	31	82.0	3.40
2007	Uni-President Lions	44	4	7	0	8	0	0	21	31	28	68.2	3.67
2008	Uni-President 7-Eleven Lions	1	0	0	0	0	0	0	2	2	3	1.1	20.25
2008	Brother Elephants	8	0	0	2	2	0	0	1	4	0	8.2	0.00
Total	7 years	208	27	29	7	28	8	4	155	330	167	495.2	3.03

=== NPB ===
Season	Team	G	W	L	HD	SV	CG	SHO	BB	SO	ER	INN	ERA
2000	Chunichi Dragons	2	0	1	0	0	0	0	6	5	6	5.2	9.53
Total	1 year	2	0	1	0	0	0	0	6	5	6	5.2	9.53

== See also ==
- Chinese Professional Baseball League
- Uni-President Lions

Awards
Preceded by Tai Lung-shui (戴龍水)	CPBL Rookie of the Year; 1999	Succeeded by Feng Sheng-hsien (馮勝賢)
Preceded by Jay Kirkpatrick	CPBL MVP of the Year; 1999	Succeeded by Mark Kiefer
