= Kuo Dai-chi =

Taiwanese baseball player

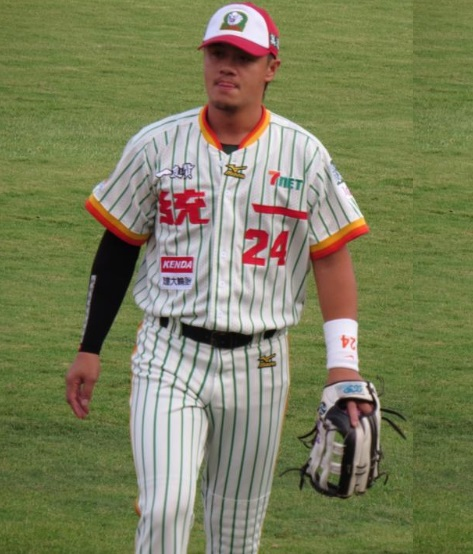
- Kuo at a baseball game of Tainan of Taiwan in 2013

Uni-President Lions – No. 24
- Right field
- Born: December 16, 1981 (age 44)
- Bats: Left Throws: Right

CPBL debut
- 13 March, 2005, for the Uni-President Lions

Career statistics (through 2007)
- Games: 246
- Batting average: .259
- Hits: 151
- Home runs: 15
- RBIs: 82
- Stolen bases: 1
- Stats at Baseball Reference

Kuo Dai-chi (Chinese: 郭岱琦; pinyin: Guō Dàiqí; Wade–Giles: Kuo^{1} Tai^{4} Chi^{2}; born 16 December 1981), Amis name Kanas Kociang, is a Taiwanese baseball player who currently plays for Uni-President Lions of Chinese Professional Baseball League. He currently plays as a right fielder for the Lions.

He underwent Tommy John surgery on his right arm, and was forced to miss the first few weeks of the season.

== See also ==
- Chinese Professional Baseball League
- Uni-President Lions
