= Tseng Chih-chen =

Taiwanese baseball player and coach

- Born: 10 March 1959; Chiayi County, Taiwan
- Occupation: baseball player

Tseng Chih-chen (Chinese: 曾智偵; pinyin: Céng Zhìzhēn; born 10 March 1959 in Chiayi County, Taiwan) is a retired Taiwanese professional baseball player and coach. He played for CPBL's Uni-President 7-Eleven Lions for nearly 18 years as a player, a coach, manager, and later assistant general manager.

== Career ==
During Tseng's amateur career with the Taiwan Power Company Baseball Team in 1980s, he had been widely regarded as one of the best catchers of his generation, and was also a frequent member of the Chinese Taipei national baseball team. He participated in the 1984 and 1988 Olympics where he won the bronze medal in 1984 (as demonstration sport).

Tseng joined the Lions in 1989 as one of the founding members of the team. He played for the Lions throughout his entire professional career, and was given the position of manager right after his first retirement as player in 1999. During his tenure he brought the Lions to the playoffs twice (in 2000 and 2001) and won in 2000. He resigned from manager position in late 2002 after the Lions' poor performance during that year and returned as a player again in 2003, at age of 44 and miraculously hit a home run during that year, setting CPBL's record of being the oldest player to hit a home run. He retired again after the 2004 season.

In 2005 and 2006 Tseng served as the assistant general manager of the Lions. He currently coaches college baseball teams in his Chiayi County hometown.
