= Chen Chun-hui =

Taiwanese baseball player

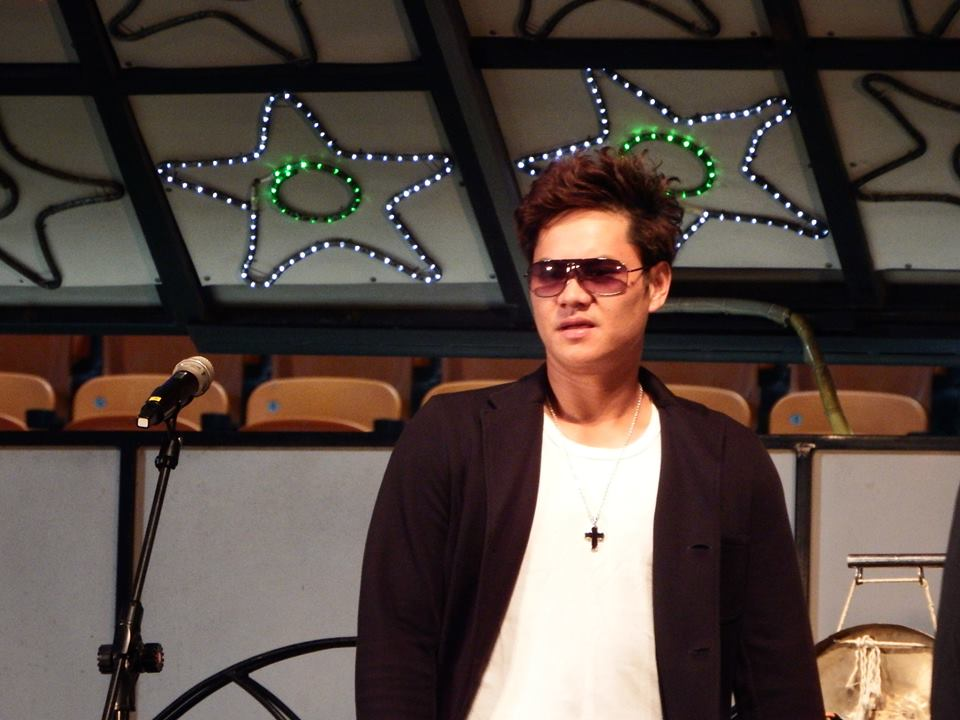

Uni-President Lions – No. 82
- Catcher
- Bats: Right Throws: Right

CPBL debut
- September 15, 2005, for the Uni-President Lions

Career statistics (through 2006)
- Games: 12
- Batting average: 0.100
- Hits: 1
- Home runs: 0
- RBIs: 0
- Stolen bases: 0
- Stats at Baseball Reference

Chen Chun-hui (Chinese: 陳俊輝; pinyin: Chén Jùnhuī) born 8 March 1981, is a Taiwanese baseball player who currently plays for Uni-President Lions of Chinese Professional Baseball League. He currently plays as catcher for the Lions, but saw very little action on the field.
