= UBL =

The acronym UBL can mean:

== People ==
- Usama bin Ladin (1957–2011), the founder of al-Qaeda commonly known as Osama bin Laden

== Organizations ==
- Ulster Bank Limited, a retail banking subsidiary of NatWest Group
- United Bank Limited, Pakistani commercial bank
- Unilever Bangladesh Limited, subsidiary of the Unilever packaged goods corporation
- United Basketball League, a semi-professional American basketball league
- University Baseball League, a collegiate Taiwanese baseball league

== Places ==
- Hubli Junction railway station in India, which has the station code UBL
- The Leiden University Library in the Netherlands, known in Dutch as the "Universitaire Bibliotheken Leiden"

== Other ==
- Ubiquitin-like proteins, a family of small proteins
- Universal Business Language, an open library of business documents
- Ultimate Band List, former online music database
