= Yang Tung-yi =

Taiwanese baseball player

Yang Sen
- Shortstop
- Bats: Right Throws: Right

CPBL debut
- March 3, 2004, for the Uni-President Lions

Career statistics (through 2006)
- Games: 232
- Batting average: 0.211
- Hits: 91
- Home runs: 0
- RBIs: 37
- Stolen bases: 20

Yang Tung-yi (simplified Chinese: 阳东益; traditional Chinese: 陽東益; pinyin: Yáng Dōngyì) born December 20, 1978, was a Taiwanese baseball player who played for the Uni-President Lions of Taiwan’s Chinese Professional Baseball League. He played as shortstop for the Lions.

== Personal life ==
Yang’s son Nien-Hsi Yang is a professional baseball pitcher in the San Francisco Giants organization.

== See also ==
- Chinese Professional Baseball League
- Uni-President Lions
