= Kao Lung-wei =

Taiwanese baseball player (born 1976)

Kao Lung-wei (Chinese: 高龍偉; born 22 March 1976) is a Taiwanese baseball player who currently plays for Uni-President Lions of Chinese Professional Baseball League. He plays as short reliever for the Lions.

== Early life ==
Kao was born in Taitung County, Taiwan. In his youth, he relocated often and attended elementary school, junior high school, and high school in different places. He attended National Taiwan College of Physical Education (Chinese: 國立台灣體育學院) and played for its baseball team, but later dropped out due to reason unknown.

== Professional career ==
He was signed by Sinon Bulls in 1999, and began his career as a reliever. However, he did not perform well as a rookie, and the Bulls decided not to continue the contract. He then signed with Uni-President Lions, and has since become a valuable reliever in the bullpen. His greatest season was the 2003 season, in which he had 52 appearances, pitched a total of 102.2 innings, and had an ERA of 3.419. His recent performances were hindered by his injury, which was the main reason for the decline in his game appearances. He was laid off by the Lions at the end of the 2008 season.
