= Huang Tzu-peng =

Taiwanese baseball player (born 1994)

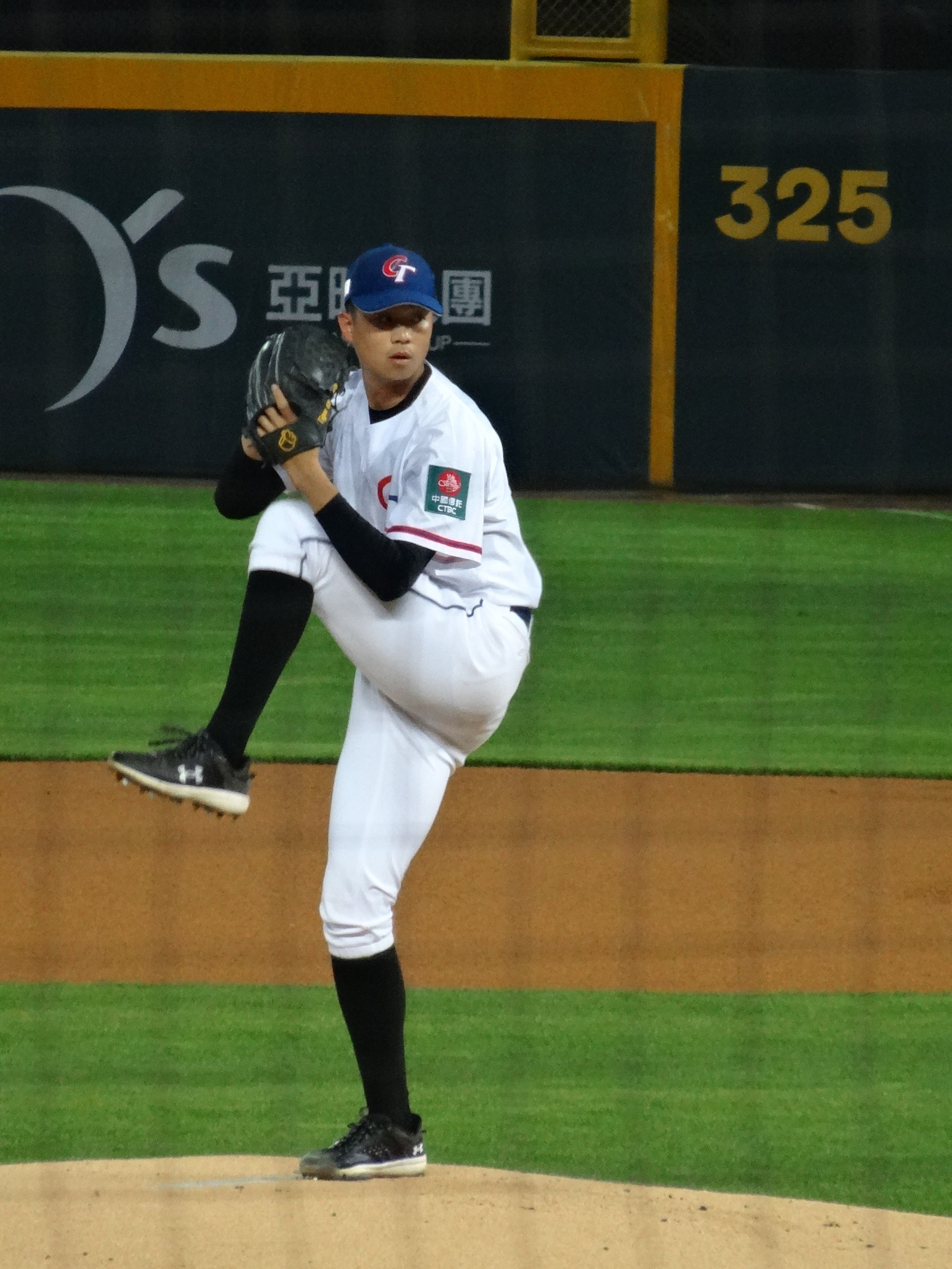

TSG Hawks – No. 69
- Pitcher
- Born: 19 March 1994 (age 31); Kaohsiung, Taiwan
- Bats: Left Throws: Right

CPBL debut
- May 9, 2018, for the Lamigo Monkeys

CPBL statistics (through 2025 season)
- Win–loss record: 51–45
- Earned run average: 3.24
- Strikeouts: 509
- Stats at Baseball Reference

Teams
- Lamigo / Rakuten Monkeys (2018–2025); TSG Hawks (2026–present)

Career highlights and awards
- 4x CPBL All-Star (2019, 2022–2024); 3x Taiwan Series champion (2018, 2019, 2025); CPBL holds champion (2019); CPBL ERA champion (2022)
Medals
Representing Chinese Taipei
Men's baseball
WBSC Premier12
Gold medal – first place	2024 Tokyo	Team

Huang Tzu-peng (Chinese: 黃子鵬; Wade–Giles: Huang^{2} Tzu^{3}-peng^{2}; born 19 March 1994 in Kaohsiung, Taiwan) is a Taiwanese professional baseball starting pitcher for the TSG Hawks of the Chinese Professional Baseball League (CPBL) in Taiwan. He has previously played in the CPBL for the Lamigo / Rakuten Monkeys. Huang is a four-time CPBL All-Star.

== Early life and education ==
Born in Kaohsiung, Taiwan, Huang attended and played baseball for Nanying Vocational High School in Tainan, graduating in 2012. He then played for Chinese Culture University. Upon graduation, he did not immediately enter the CPBL draft, but chose to join the Topco Falcons, a semi-professional team.

== Professional career ==
=== Lamigo / Rakuten Monkeys ===
In 2017, Huang was selected in the seventh round of the CPBL draft by the Lamigo Monkeys.

In 2023, Huang took the mound against Wei Chuan Dragons pitcher Hsu Jo-hsi in Game 6 of the Taiwan Series. Huang gave up two runs over six innings in the 2–0 loss.

On 9 May 2025, Huang gave up a home run to Dragons shortstop Chang Cheng-yu, who became the first player in the league to hit a home run using a torpedo bat. He made 25 appearances (20 starts) for the team, logging a 4–8 record and 4.07 ERA with 68 strikeouts across 117 1/3 innings pitched. With the Monkeys, Huang won the 2025 Taiwan Series. He elected free agency on 4 November.

=== TSG Hawks ===
On 21 November 2025, Huang signed with the TSG Hawks of the Chinese Professional Baseball League.

== International career ==
Huang was selected to represent Taiwan in the 2014 U-21 Baseball World Cup and the 2019 WBSC Premier12.

In the 2023 World Baseball Classic, Huang took the mound against the Netherlands in the pool stage. He gave up 2 hits in 2.2 innings, including an RBI single by Didi Gregorius.

He was again selected to play for Team Taiwan in the 2024 WBSC Premier12 tournament. He started against the Dominican Republic in the Opening Round at Taipei Dome, pitching 6 scoreless innings; then against Cuba, pitching 1.1 innings with 4 strikeouts. He was again the starting pitcher against Venezuela in the Super Round, pitching 4.2 innings, allowing 2 runs, and recording a loss.

== Personal life ==
Huang is nicknamed "Tiger." He was named an outstanding alumnus of Nanying Vocational High School in 2022. Fellow alumnus and pitcher Hong-Chih Kuo attended the celebration where Huang received this honor.
