= Kao Cheng-hua =

Taiwanese baseball player

Uni-President Lions – No. 72
- Catcher / Coach
- Born: 1 July 1977 (age 48); Hualien County, Taiwan
- Batted: Right Threw: Right

CPBL debut
- March 12, 2000, for the Uni-President Lions

Last CPBL appearance
- October 2, 2010, for the Uni-President Lions

Career statistics (through 2010)
- Games: 402
- Batting average: 0.216
- Hits: 172
- Home runs: 4
- RBIs: 66
- Stolen bases: 5
- Stats at Baseball Reference

Kao Cheng-hua (Chinese: 高政華; pinyin: Gāo Zhènghuá; born 1 July 1977) is a Taiwanese baseball player who played for Uni-President Lions of Chinese Professional Baseball League. He played as catcher for the Lions.
