= Pan Chun-jung =

Taiwanese former baseball player

Uni-President Lions – No. 21
- Relief pitcher
- Born: January 2, 1983 (age 42); Taiwan
- Bats: Left Throws: Left

debut
- April 15, 2007, for the Uni-President Lions

Career statistics (through 2007)
- Record: 2-1
- Saves: 1
- Holds: 4
- ERA: 4.909
- Strikeouts: 27

Teams
- Uni-President Lions (2007–2013)

Pan Chun-jung (Chinese: 潘俊榮; pinyin: Pān Jùnróng; born 2 January 1983 in Taiwan) is a Taiwanese former baseball player who played for Uni-President Lions of Chinese Professional Baseball League (CPBL). He is currently a coach for the Lions.

== Early life ==
A native to Kaohsiung County (now part of Kaohsiung City), Pan began formal baseball training at the junior level as most of Taiwan's baseball players had. His father is an enthusiastic baseball fan, and has supported him all the way. He played for local baseball teams in his hometown throughout his compulsory education, and only left for Taipei to play for Taipei Physical Education College (Chinese: 台北體育學院), the alma mater of Yankees starting pitcher Wang Chien-Ming, after completing high school. He passed the alternative service examination and entered the 2005 alternative service draft.

== Professional career ==
He was drafted by Uni-President Lions in the first round, and was guaranteed a contract before fulfilling his one-year obligation for alternative service. He made his debut on April 15, 2007, and immediately became active in the bullpen. His first win came when he took the mound against Macoto Cobras at the bottom of the sixth inning on May 15, 2007, when the Lions were trailing by two runs; he pitched for 3.1 innings, gave up one hit and one run while struck out five and walked one. His teammates were able to turn the tide of the game, scored seven runs in the three and one third innings he pitched and made him the winning pitcher.

== See also ==
- Chinese Professional Baseball League
- Uni-President Lions
