= Cheng Po-jen =

Taiwanese baseball player

Uni-President Lions – No. 81
- Relief pitcher
- Born: October 17, 1982 (age 43); Taiwan
- Bats: Right Throws: Right

CPBL debut
- March 22, 2006, for the Uni-President Lions

Career statistics (through April 4, 2008)
- Record: 2-1
- Saves: 0
- Holds: 5
- ERA: 4.869
- Strikeouts: 32

Teams
- Uni-President Lions (2006–2009)

Cheng Po-jen (Chinese: 鄭博壬; pinyin: Zhèng Bórén; born 17 October 1982 in Taiwan) is a former Taiwanese baseball player who previously played for Uni-President Lions of Chinese Professional Baseball League (CPBL). After retiring, he became the pitching coach for the team.

== See also ==
- Chinese Professional Baseball League
- Uni-President Lions
