= Yeh Ting-jen =

Taiwanese baseball player

Brother Elephants – No. 19
- Pitcher
- Born: July 1, 1983 (age 42); Taiwan
- Bats: Left Throws: Left

CPBL debut
- March 21, 2007, for the Brother Elephants

Career statistics (through 2008)
- Record: 1-5
- Holds: 1
- ERA: 9.15
- Strikeouts: 52
- Stats at Baseball Reference

Teams
- Brother Elephants (2007–present)

Yeh Ting-jen (Chinese: 葉丁仁; born July 1, 1983, in Taiwan) is a Taiwanese baseball player who currently plays for Brother Elephants of Chinese Professional Baseball League. He is a pitcher who throws and bats left-handed. He is 6 feet 1 inch (1.85 m) and weighs 189 pounds (86 kg).

He pitched for the Lowell Spinners minor league team in the New York Penn league in 2006, playing in 9 games, with a record of 1–0 and an Earned run average of 9.53 and batted .400 as well. The Lowell Spinners are a minor-league affiliate of the Boston Red Sox.

== Career statistics ==
| Season | Team | G | W | L | HD | SV | CG | SHO | BB | SO | ER | INN | ERA |
|---|---|---|---|---|---|---|---|---|---|---|---|---|---|
| 2007 | Brother Elephants | 23 | 1 | 4 | 1 | 0 | 0 | 0 | 47 | 39 | 37 | 43.1 | 7.69 |
| 2008 | Brother Elephants | 10 | 0 | 1 | 0 | 0 | 0 | 0 | 34 | 13 | 26 | 18.2 | 12.54 |
| Total | 2 years | 33 | 1 | 5 | 1 | 0 | 0 | 0 | 81 | 52 | 63 | 62.0 | 9.15 |

== See also ==
- Chinese Professional Baseball League
- Brother Elephants
