= Yeh Yung-chieh =

Taiwanese baseball player

- Minor League pitching coach
- Born: April 21, 1985 (age 41); New Taipei City, Taiwan
- Bats: Right Throws: Right

CPBL debut
- May 24, 2006, for the Brother Elephants

Career statistics (through 2008)
- Win–loss record: 17–23
- Earned run average: 5.06
- Strikeouts: 161
- Stats at Baseball Reference

Teams
- Brother Elephants (2005–2012)
Medals
Men's baseball
Representing Chinese Taipei
World Junior Baseball Championship
Silver medal – second place	2002 Sherbrooke	Team

Yeh Yung-chieh (Chinese: 葉詠捷; born April 21, 1985, in Taiwan) is a former Taiwanese baseball player who played for the Brother Elephants of Chinese Professional Baseball League. He currently serves as the minor league pitching coach for the TSG Hawks.

== Career statistics ==
Season	Team	G	W	L	HD	SV	CG	SHO	BB	SO	ER	INN	ERA
2006	Brother Elephants	24	4	8	1	0	0	0	40	36	51	69.2	6.59
2007	Brother Elephants	29	5	7	0	0	0	0	51	73	45	79.0	5.12
2008	Brother Elephants	47	8	8	10	1	0	0	25	52	24	63.2	3.39
Total	3 years	100	17	23	11	1	0	0	116	161	120	212.1	5.06

== See also ==
- Chinese Professional Baseball League
