= Kevin Tolar =

American baseball player (born 1971)

- Pitcher
- Born: January 28, 1971 (age 55); Panama City, Florida, U.S.
- Batted: Right Threw: Left

MLB debut
- September 11, 2000, for the Detroit Tigers

Last MLB appearance
- May 4, 2003, for the Boston Red Sox

MLB statistics
- Win–loss record: 0–0
- Earned run average: 6.62
- Strikeouts: 17

CPBL statistics
- Win–loss record: 4–3
- Earned run average: 2.82
- Strikeouts: 52
- Stats at Baseball Reference

Teams
- Detroit Tigers (2000–2001); Boston Red Sox (2003); Chinatrust Whales (2007)

Kevin Anthony Tolar (born January 28, 1971) is a former Major League Baseball (MLB) pitcher. He played in parts of three seasons at the major league level for the Detroit Tigers and Boston Red Sox.

He was drafted by the Chicago White Sox in the 9th round of the 1989 amateur draft. Tolar played his first professional season with their Rookie league Gulf Coast League White Sox in 1989, and his last with the independent Atlantic League's Long Island Ducks in 2006. He played his last affiliated season in 2005 for the Triple-A affiliates of the Arizona Diamondbacks (Tucson Sidewinders) and the Toronto Blue Jays (Syracuse SkyChiefs).

After that, Tolar has played for the Aragua Tigers club of the Venezuelan Professional Baseball League (2006–2008), and the Long Island Ducks of the Atlantic League.
