= Wu Pao-hsien =

Taiwanese baseball player

Brother Elephants – No. 43
- Pitcher
- Born: February 6, 1980 (age 46); Kaohsiung, Taiwan
- Batted: Right Threw: Right

CPBL debut
- April 1, 2004, for the Brother Elephants

Last CPBL appearance
- October 6, 2009, for the Brother Elephants

Career statistics (through 2009)
- Record: 13-9
- Holds: 7
- Saves: 11
- ERA: 4.12
- Strikeouts: 168
- Stats at Baseball Reference

Teams
- Brother Elephants (2004–2009)

Wu Pao-hsien (Chinese: 吳保賢; born February 6, 1980) is a Taiwanese former professional baseball pitcher who spent his career playing for the Brother Elephants of the Chinese Professional Baseball League (CPBL). In 2009, Wu admitted to his part in a match-fixing scandal involving the Elephants and a gambling syndicate, resulting in his expulsion from the team and permanent ban from the CPBL.

== Career statistics ==
Season	Team	G	W	L	HD	SV	CG	SHO	BB	SO	ER	INN	ERA
2004	Brother Elephants	1	0	0	0	0	0	0	2	1	1	0.2	13.50
2005	Brother Elephants	36	8	3	0	11	0	0	22	55	14	57.0	2.21
2006	Brother Elephants	20	2	2	1	0	0	0	38	45	31	50.0	5.58
2007	Brother Elephants	18	1	2	2	0	0	0	27	25	18	37.1	4.34
2008	Brother Elephants	31	2	1	4	0	0	0	25	22	11	32.2	3.03
Total	5 years	106	13	8	7	11	0	0	114	148	75	177.2	3.80
