= Gary Rath =

American baseball player (born 1973)

- Pitcher
- Born: January 10, 1973 (age 53); Gulfport, Mississippi, U.S.
- Batted: Left Threw: Left

MLB debut
- June 2, 1998, for the Los Angeles Dodgers

Last MLB appearance
- June 22, 1999, for the Minnesota Twins

MLB statistics
- Win–loss record: 0-1
- Earned run average: 11.25
- Strikeouts: 5
- Stats at Baseball Reference

Teams
- Los Angeles Dodgers (1998); Minnesota Twins (1999); Haitai Tigers / Kia Tigers (2001); Doosan Bears (2002); Yomiuri Giants (2003); Doosan Bears (2004); Tohoku Rakuten Golden Eagles (2005); La New Bears (2007); Doosan Bears (2008)

Alfred Gary Rath (born January 10, 1973) is an American former Major League Baseball left-handed pitcher. Rath pitched for the Los Angeles Dodgers in 1998, and for the Minnesota Twins in 1999. He has also played professionally in Japan, South Korea, and Taiwan.

Rath is a 1991 graduate of Long Beach (MS) High School. Rath played collegiately at Mississippi State University from 1992 to 1994 where he was a First Team All-SEC (1994) selection; a First Team All-American (Baseball America, ABCA); Second Team All American (Mizuno); and Third Team All American (NCSWA). After the 1993 season, he played collegiate summer baseball with the Brewster Whitecaps of the Cape Cod Baseball League. As a junior in 1994 he was the Los Angeles Dodgers' 2nd round pick (47th overall) and made his major league debut on June 2, 1998, against the St. Louis Cardinals in Dodger Stadium.

In 2007, Rath played for the La New Bears of the CPBL and in 2008, the Doosan Bears of the KBO.
