= Tseng Yi-cheng =

Taiwanese baseball player

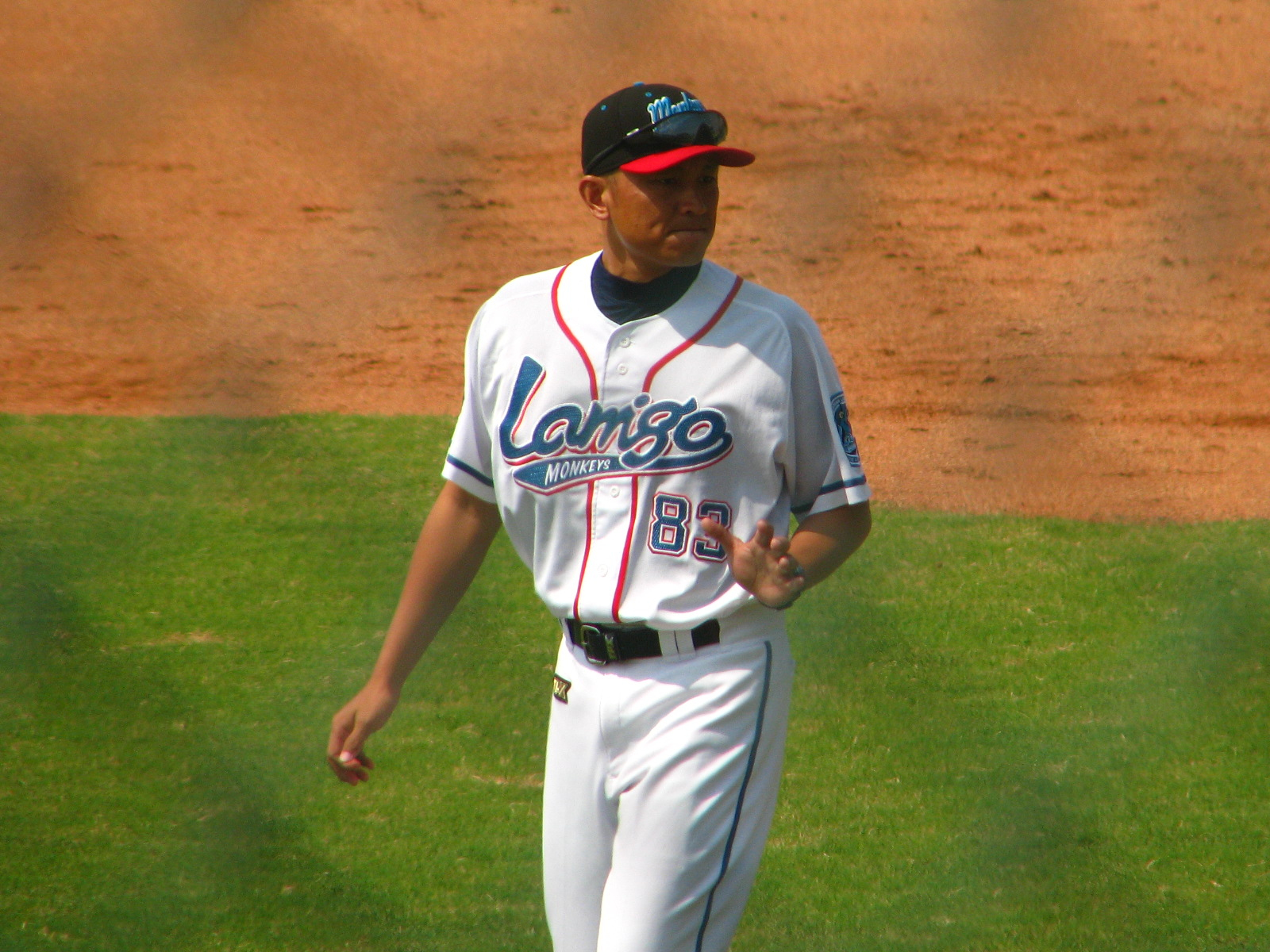

Rakuten Monkeys – No. 83
- Pitcher / Coach
- Born: 12 August 1978 (age 47); Xinfeng, Hsinchu, Hsinchu County, Taiwan
- Bats: Right Throws: Right

CPBL debut
- September 28, 2000, for the Uni-President Lions

Career statistics (through 2007)
- Record: 17-21
- Saves: 20
- Holds: 17
- ERA: 3.358
- Strikeouts: 275

Teams
- As player: Uni-President Lions/ Uni-President 7-Eleven Lions (2000–2010, 2012); As coach: Lamigo Monkeys/Rakuten Monkeys (2013–present)

Career highlights and awards
- Best CPBL Reliever (2005)

Tseng Yi-cheng (Chinese: 曾翊誠; pinyin: Céng Yìchéng; born 12 August 1978 in Taiwan) is a Taiwanese baseball player who currently coaches for Rakuten Monkeys of Chinese Professional Baseball League.
