= Joey Dawley =

American baseball player (born 1971)

- Pitcher
- Born: September 19, 1971 (age 54); Riverside, California, U.S.
- Batted: Right Threw: Right

Professional debut
- MLB: September 29, 2002, for the Atlanta Braves
- CPBL: May 4, 2006, for the Brother Elephants

Last appearance
- MLB: June 5, 2004, for the Cleveland Indians
- CPBL: October 8, 2007, for the Brother Elephants

MLB statistics
- Win–loss record: 0–0
- Earned run average: 10.91
- Strikeouts: 17

CPBL statistics
- Win–loss record: 18–12
- Earned run average: 3.18
- Strikeouts: 232
- Stats at Baseball Reference

Teams
- Atlanta Braves (2002–2003); Cleveland Indians (2004); Brother Elephants (2006–2007)

Joseph Thomas Dawley (born September 19, 1971) is an American former Major League Baseball player. As a pitcher, Dawley played for the Atlanta Braves (2002-2003) and Cleveland Indians in 2004.

After being released by the Orioles in 1995, Dawley played 3½ seasons in independent ball before signing with the Braves for 1999.
