= University Baseball League =

Collegiate baseball league in Taiwan

- Sport: Baseball
- Founded: 1996
- Country: Taiwan
- Continent: Asia
- Most titles: Chinese Culture University (11)

The University Baseball League (UBL; Chinese: 大專棒球運動聯賽) is a collegiate baseball league in Taiwan that began play in 1996. The UBL is organized by the Ministry of Education and co-sponsored by the Chinese Taipei University Sports Federation.

In 2015, the women's division began play. In the 2022 season, a total of 98 schools participated in four divisions.

Chinese Culture University holds the most championships at 11 and is the only school to have won three consecutive championships in league history.

== Programs ==
School	Location	Founded	Years participated	Championships
National University of Kaohsiung (NUK)	Kaohsiung		2022, 2023	
CTBC Business School	Tainan	2005	2021–2023	
National Taitung University	Tainan	2014	2018, 2021–2023	
National Taiwan University of Sport (NTUS)	Taichung	1961	2012, 2014–2018, 2021–2023	2022
Chia Nan University of Pharmacy and Science (CNU)	Tainan	2004	2021–2023	
National Chiayi University (NCYU)	Chiayi	1931	2018, 2021–2023	
University of Taipei (UT)	Taipei	1968	2018, 2021–2023	2023
Far East University (FEU)	Tainan	2012	2018, 2021–2023	
Kainan University	Taoyuan	2004	2012–2018, 2021–2023	
Kun Shan University (KSU)	Tainan	2019	2021–2023	
National Taiwan Sport University (NTSU)	Taoyuan	1998	2014–2016, 2018, 2021–2023	
Kao Yuan University	Kaohsiung	2008	2018, 2021–2023	
Meiho University	Pingtung County	2014	2018, 2021–2023	
Nanhua University (NHU)	Chiayi County	2016	2018, 2020–2023	
Chinese Culture University (Meifu Giants)	Taipei	1963	2012–2023	
Fu Jen Catholic University	New Taipei	1976	2013–2016, 2018, 2021–2023	
Vanung University	Taoyuan	2001	2021–2023	
TransWorld University	Yunlin County	2001	2022	
Tatung Institute of Commerce and Technology	Chiayi	2011	2016, 2021, 2022	
