= Pete Munro =

American baseball player (born 1975)

- Pitcher
- Born: June 14, 1975 (age 50); Flushing, New York, U.S.
- Batted: Right Threw: Right

MLB debut
- April 6, 1999, for the Toronto Blue Jays

Last MLB appearance
- October 1, 2004, for the Houston Astros

MLB statistics
- Win–loss record: 13–19
- Earned run average: 4.88
- Strikeouts: 189
- Stats at Baseball Reference

Teams
- Toronto Blue Jays (1999–2000); Houston Astros (2002–2004)

Career highlights and awards
- Pitched a combined no-hitter on June 11, 2003

Peter Daniel Munro (born June 14, 1975) is an American former starting pitcher in Major League Baseball. He played with the Toronto Blue Jays (1999–2000) and Houston Astros (2002–2004). He batted and threw right-handed.

== Career ==
After being selected by the Boston Red Sox in the 6th round of the 1993 Major League Baseball draft, Munro was sent by Boston to the Toronto Blue Jays in 1998 in the same transaction which brought catcher Mike Stanley to the Red Sox.

Munro debuted with Toronto in 1999. He pitched in a combined 40 games in his two seasons with Toronto. After pitching in parts of two seasons, the Blue Jays sent Munro to the Texas Rangers as the player to be named later traded for Dave Martinez. He re-signed with the Rangers for the 2001 season.

Munro signed with the Houston Astros before the 2002 season and split time between AAA and the majors, pitching to a career low 3.57 ERA in 19 games (14 starts). His career highlight came on June 11, 2003, when he combined with Houston pitchers Roy Oswalt, Kirk Saarloos, Brad Lidge, Octavio Dotel, and Billy Wagner to throw the first no-hitter against the New York Yankees in 45 years. The Astros sextet also set a major league record for the highest number of pitchers to throw a no-hitter.

In 2003, Munro pitched the majority of the season out of the bullpen, appearing in 40 games while making 2 spot starts during the season.

In his final season with Houston, he went 4–7 with a 5.15 ERA. Another highlight in Munro's career was in the 2004 NLCS, when he got the ball in Game 2 and Game 6 (In Game 6, he was picked to start over 7-time Cy Young Award winner Roger Clemens). After the season, he signed with the Minnesota Twins on a minor league deal.

Munro started 2006 pitching for the Rochester Red Wings, the Triple-A affiliate of the Minnesota Twins. He signed with Uni-President Lions of Taiwan's Chinese Professional Baseball League in March 2007, and was selected to the CPBL All-Star Game in July. Munro signed with the York Revolution of the independent Atlantic League for the 2008 season, but was released after sustaining an injury.

== See also ==
- List of Houston Astros no-hitters
- List of Major League Baseball no-hitters

Awards and achievements
Preceded by Kevin Millwood	No-hit game June 11, 2003 (with Oswalt, Saarloos, Lidge, Dotel, & Wagner)	Succeeded by Randy Johnson
