= Shen Po-tsang =

Taiwanese baseball player

TSG Hawks – No. 35
- Pitcher / Coach
- Born: 31 August 1977 (age 48); Taiwan
- Bats: Right Throws: Right

debut
- July 7, 2002, for the Uni-President Lions

Career statistics (through April 4, 2008)
- Record: 1-6
- Saves: 2
- Holds: 22
- ERA: 4.012
- Strikeouts: 108
- Stats at Baseball Reference

Teams
- Uni-President Lions (2002–2010)

Shen Po-tsang (Chinese: 沈柏蒼; pinyin: Shěn Bócāng; born 31 August 1977 in Taiwan) is a Taiwanese baseball player who played for the Uni-President Lions of the Chinese Professional Baseball League. He played as short reliever for the Lions.

== See also ==
- Chinese Professional Baseball League
- Uni-President Lions
