= Hsu Wen-hsiung =

Taiwanese baseball player

- Pitcher
- Born: 5 December 1978 (age 47)
- Batted: Right Threw: Right

CPBL debut
- 2003, for the First Financial Holdings Agan

Last CPBL appearance
- 2009, for the La New Bears

Career statistics
- Win–loss record: 35–46
- Earned run average: 3.78
- Strikeouts: 541
- Stats at Baseball Reference

Teams
- First Financial Holdings Agan / La New Bears (2003–2009)

Hsu Wen-hsiung (born 5 December 1978) is a Taiwanese baseball player who competed in the 2008 Summer Olympics.
