= Kevin Huang =

Taiwanese baseball player

- Pitcher
- Born: April 25, 1982 (age 43); Pingtung City, Taiwan
- Batted: Right Threw: Right

CPBL debut
- March 22, 2006, for the La New Bears

Last CPBL appearance
- September 27, 2008, for the La New Bears

CPBL statistics
- Win–loss record: 13–9
- Earned run average: 3.34
- Strikeouts: 136
- Stats at Baseball Reference

Teams
- La New Bears (2006–2008)

Chun-chung "Kevin" Huang (Chinese: 黃俊中; pinyin: Huáng Jùnzhōng; Wade–Giles: Huang^{2} Chun^{4}-chung^{1}; born 25 April 1982) is a Taiwanese former professional baseball player who competed in the 2004 Summer Olympics. Huang is a right handed relief pitcher who usually enters the game in the 7th inning. He was drafted in 2001 when he was 19 years old and played until 2008. Being most notable for his work in the minor leagues. A minor league is the league directly underneath the major league. Huang spent 3 seasons in the minor league and an overall 6 seasons in his career. In his time in the sport, he aided in 27 wins and 20 loses. These are games he pitched at least one inning in. During his career had an overall ERA of 3.65. Throughout his entire career he only allowed 24 home runs. Huang only walked a total of 141 during his career. Haung bat right handed as well however he did not get much batting time within his time in the sport.

In 2004, Huang was a member of the Olympic team for Taiwan in Athens. This team faced some struggles as one of their most praised pitchers, Chang Chih-chia was suffering a shoulder injury. These Olympic games were difficult for the team as many of the other teams were more skilled. Keven Haung was a part of this team however he did have that much playing time. This team did not make it all the way to the final tournament. That year, Cuba received gold in baseball.
