= Nelson Figueroa =

American baseball player (born 1974)

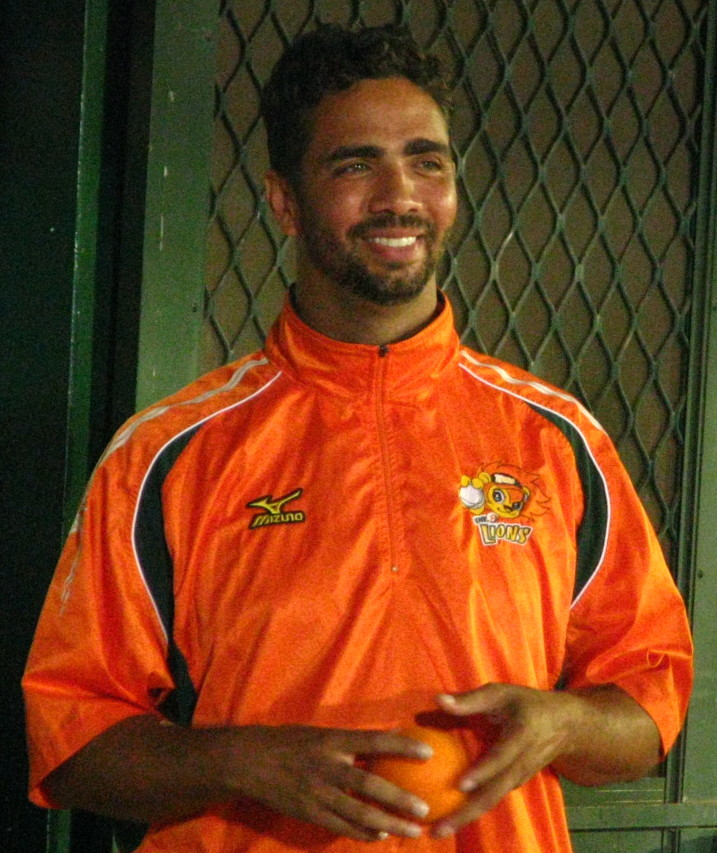
- Figueroa with the Uni-Lions in 2014
- Pitcher
- Born: May 18, 1974 (age 52); Brooklyn, New York, U.S.
- Batted: Switch Threw: Right

Professional debut
- MLB: June 3, 2000, for the Arizona Diamondbacks
- CPBL: September 15, 2007, for the Uni-President Lions

Last appearance
- MLB: May 9, 2011, for the Houston Astros
- CPBL: August 28, 2014, for the Uni-President 7-Eleven Lions

MLB statistics
- Win–loss record: 20–35
- Earned run average: 4.55
- Strikeouts: 337

CPBL statistics
- Win–loss record: 22–11
- Earned run average: 3.08
- Strikeouts: 187
- Stats at Baseball Reference

Teams
- Arizona Diamondbacks (2000); Philadelphia Phillies (2001); Milwaukee Brewers (2002); Pittsburgh Pirates (2003–2004); Uni-President Lions (2007); New York Mets (2008–2009); Philadelphia Phillies (2010); Houston Astros (2010–2011); Uni-President 7-Eleven Lions (2013–2014)

Career highlights and awards
- CPBL: 2x Taiwan Series champion (2007, 2013); Taiwan Series MVP (2007); International: All-World Baseball Classic Team (2013)
Medals
Men's baseball
Representing Puerto Rico
World Baseball Classic
Silver medal – second place	2013 San Francisco	National team

Nelson Figueroa (born May 18, 1974) is an American former professional baseball pitcher. He played in Major League Baseball (MLB) for the Arizona Diamondbacks, Philadelphia Phillies, Milwaukee Brewers, Pittsburgh Pirates, New York Mets, and Houston Astros. Figueroa also played for the Uni-President 7-Eleven Lions of the Chinese Professional Baseball League (CPBL) in Taiwan. He featured a fastball topping out at 91 mph, slider, curveball, changeup, and a splitter. He has also worked as a post-game studio analyst for Mets broadcasts.

== Early career ==
Figueroa attended Brandeis University from 1992 to 1995, where he pitched for three years and earned a bachelor's degree in American Studies. In 1994, he played collegiate summer baseball with the Wareham Gatemen of the Cape Cod Baseball League and was named a league all-star. He was drafted 833rd overall by the New York Mets in the 30th round of the 1995 Major League Baseball draft. The Mets traded Figueroa with outfielder Bernard Gilkey to the Arizona Diamondbacks in 1998 for Jorge Fábregas, Willie Blair and cash considerations.

Figueroa made his major league debut with the Diamondbacks during the 2000 season, becoming the first Brandeis University alumnus to reach the major leagues. Figueroa started in three games that year and compiled an 0–1 record and a 7.47 ERA. On July 26, 2000, Figueroa was traded with Vicente Padilla, Travis Lee, and Omar Daal to the Philadelphia Phillies for Curt Schilling. Figueroa spent the rest of the 2000 season pitching for the Scranton/Wilkes-Barre Red Barons of the International League (AAA), compiling a record of 4–3 and an ERA of 3.78.

=== Milwaukee Brewers ===
In 2001, Figueroa tossed 89 innings for the Phillies and finished the season with a 4–5 record and 3.94 ERA.

The right-hander was claimed off waivers on October 11, 2001, by the Milwaukee Brewers. Figueroa spent one season in Milwaukee where he regressed to a 1–7 record and 5.03 ERA.

=== Pittsburgh Pirates ===
He then signed as a free agent with the Pittsburgh Pirates on January 6, 2003. Figueroa spent most of the 2003 season pitching for the Nashville Sounds, the Triple-A affiliate of the Pirates. He was promoted late in the season and went 2–1 with a 3.31 ERA for Pittsburgh.

After a brief stint with the Pirates in 2004, Figueroa spent 2005 rehabilitating a torn rotator cuff that he had played with during the previous season.

He signed a minor-league contract with the Washington Nationals early in 2006 and spent the season pitching for the Triple-A New Orleans Zephyrs, where he posted a 4.38 ERA in 76 innings of work.

== Foreign leagues ==
In 2007, he signed with Dorados de Chihuahua of the Mexican League. Figueroa went to Taiwan in September 2007 as a late season addition to the Uni-President Lions of the Chinese Professional Baseball League (CPBL). He started 4 games for the Lions, won them all, had 8 walks and 21 strikeouts in 30 innings, had an ERA of 3.00, and helped the Lions secure the wild-card spot in the playoff series.

In the first round best-of-five series against Macoto Cobras, Figueroa started for the Lions in the first game. He pitched for 8 innings, gave up only 6 hits, 2 walks, and 2 runs while striking out 8 hitters. The Lions won the game with a score of 9–4 with Figueroa the winning pitcher, and advanced to the championship series by sweeping the Cobras in three games.

In the 2007 Taiwan Series CPBL championship series against the La New Bears, Figueroa started in three games, the first, fourth, and seventh games, and won them all. He was selected as the series MVP and now holds the record in the Taiwan Series history as the starting pitcher with the most games won.

In the 2009 Venezuelan Winter league round robin, he pitched for Cardenales de Lara (Lara's Cardinals) and pitched a no hit no run for nine innings but the game was still 0–0, he came again in the 10th and gave up a hit, ending the streak. Cardenales won in 10 innings, 1–0. Figueroa was the winning pitcher.

== Return to MLB ==
=== New York Mets ===
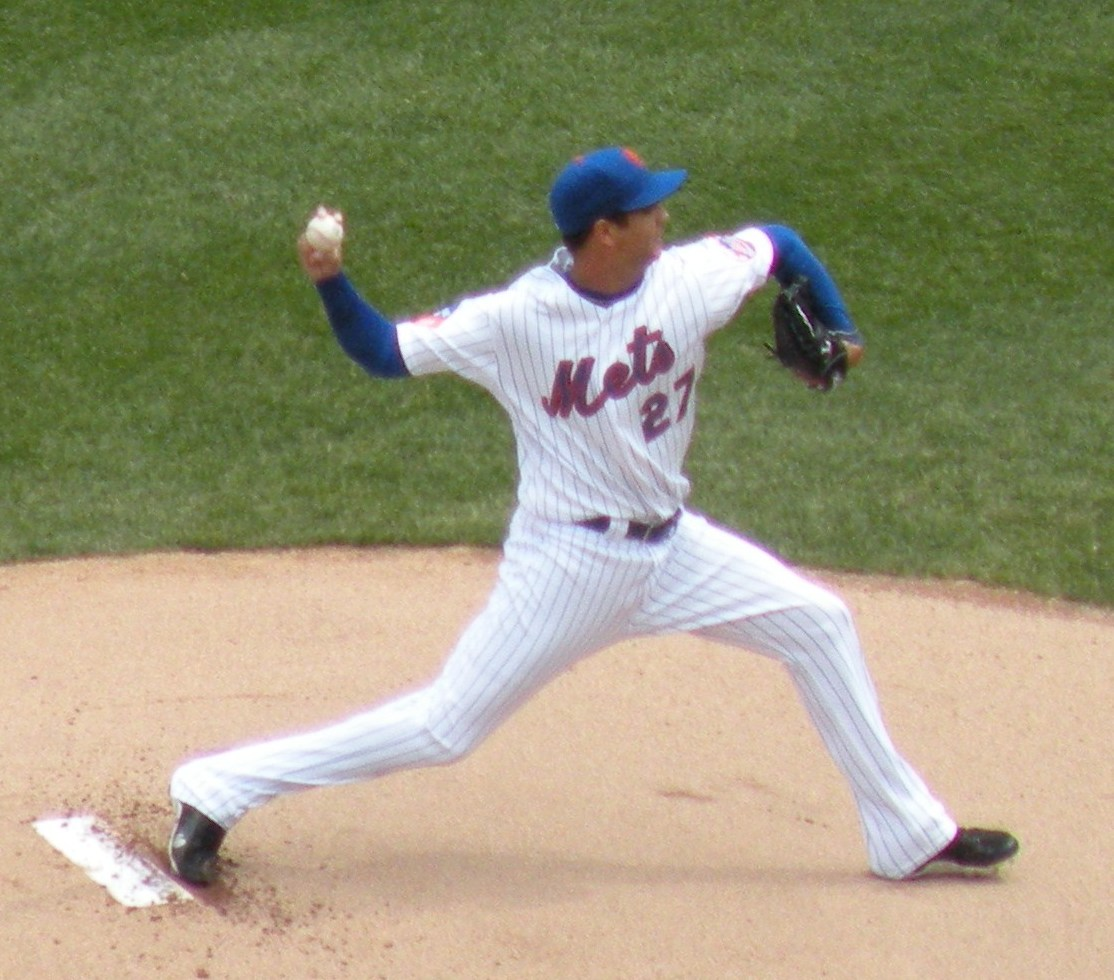
Figueroa with the Mets at Citi Field in 2009

In his return to Major League Baseball on April 11, 2008, Figueroa had his first start with the New York Mets. He pitched 6 innings, allowed 2 hits, walked two and struck out 6, getting credit for the victory with the Mets going on to win 4–2. In attendance was his family, who cheered him on from Mets closer Billy Wagner's suite. On May 13, 2008, he along with reliever Jorge Sosa was designated for assignment to make room for activated reliever Matt Wise. He was eventually sent outright to the minors. Figueroa was brought back to the Mets on August 27, spending September as a member of the Mets' bullpen. On December 3, he was re-signed by the New York Mets to a minor league contract.

Nelson was called up on April 19, 2009, to start against the Brewers in place of injured Mike Pelfrey, and was designated for assignment following the game. On April 25, 2009, he re-signed with the Mets and was assigned to Triple-A Buffalo.

On October 4, 2009, the last day of the 2009 MLB regular season, Figueroa tossed a four-hitter and struck out seven batters for the first complete game and shutout (4–0) of his major league baseball career. It was also the first complete game shutout ever thrown by a Mets pitcher at Citi Field. He had a two-run triple against the Cardinals on August 5, 2009. He became the first pitcher to hit a triple since Orlando Hernández in 2006.

=== Philadelphia Phillies ===
On April 7, 2010, the Phillies claimed Figueroa off waivers for use in the role of long reliever. On May 31, the Phillies designated him for assignment, and he accepted outright assignment to Triple-A Lehigh Valley. On June 24, he was called up when Chad Durbin was placed on the DL, and was then designated for assignment again in July.

=== Houston Astros ===
Figueroa was claimed by the Astros on July 21, 2010. He made 26 appearances for Houston in parts of the 2010 and 2011 seasons. His final MLB appearance was with the Astros on May 9, 2011. He was designated for assignment by the Astros that day, then released on August 18.

=== Late career ===
On August 23, 2011, Figueroa signed a minor league contract with the Pittsburgh Pirates and was assigned to the Triple-A Indianapolis Indians.

Figueroa signed a minor league contract with the Toronto Blue Jays on January 19, 2012. He was released by the Blue Jays on March 31, 2012. He signed a minor league contract with the New York Yankees on April 17, 2012. He was released on July 19. On July 24, he signed a minor league contract with the Boston Red Sox and was assigned to the Triple-A Pawtucket Red Sox where he was the winning pitcher in each of the team's clinching games on the way to winning its first Governors' Cup in 28 years.

Figueroa signed a minor league contract with the Arizona Diamondbacks on December 21, 2012. He was released on April 26, 2013.

Figueroa again signed with Taiwan's Uni-President 7-Eleven Lions in mid-2013.

== Post-playing career ==
On February 16, 2015, SNY announced that Figueroa would replace Bob Ojeda as the pre/post-game analyst for their Mets broadcasts. On June 1, 2019, SNY announced that it had fired Figueroa.

On March 3, 2022, Figueroa was announced as the new pitching coach for the Staten Island FerryHawks of the Atlantic League of Professional Baseball. On August 9, with the FerryHawks unexpectedly playing a doubleheader, Figueroa pitched the first game, throwing 119 pitches through all seven innings of the contest at age 48.

On January 31, 2023, Figueroa was announced by the Long Island Ducks of the Atlantic League of Professional Baseball as their new pitching coach. However, he stepped down prior to the start of the season in order to pursue another opportunity in broadcasting.

As of 2025 Figueroa is the co-host of "Sports Nation Nightly" on WPIX in New York.

== International career ==
Figueroa pitched for the Puerto Rican national team in the 2013 World Baseball Classic, where the team won a silver medal. Following the conclusion of the tournament, which was won by Dominican Republic upon beating Puerto Rico in the final, Figueroa was named to the All-WBC team.

During the second game played against the United States, Figueroa was the starting pitcher at age 38 and allowed just two hits in six scoreless innings. Until this win, his best game had been a four-hit shutout for the Mets on the final day of the 2009 season. Puerto Rico won the game, 4–3, and eliminated the United States with the result.

== Personal life ==
Figueroa is married and spends the off-season in Arizona and New Jersey. He has one daughter named Renee. He is a graduate of Abraham Lincoln High School, Mark Twain Intermediate School 239 for the Gifted and Talented, and Public School 188, the Michael E. Berdy School in Brooklyn, New York.

He is also an artist who helped design patriotic t-shirts for Major League Baseball in the aftermath of 9/11. The shirts were sold to raise money for charity. He has a skill with electronics that former manager Jerry Royster called "just amazing."
