= Pan Wei-lun =

Taiwanese baseball player (born 1982)

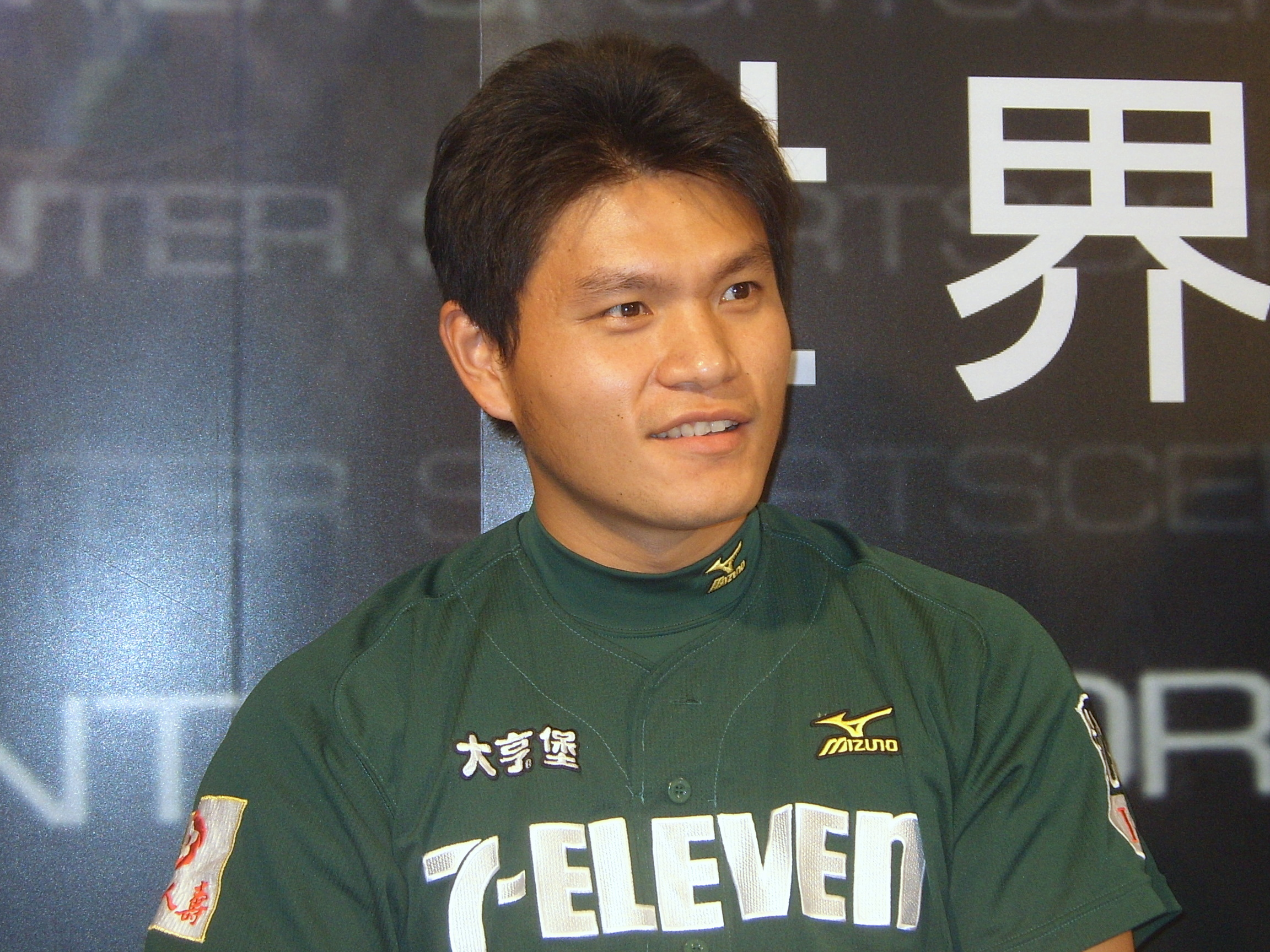

Uni-President Lions – No. 18
- Pitcher / Coach
- Born: 5 March 1982 (age 44); Pingtung County, Taiwan
- Batted: Right Threw: Right

CPBL debut
- March 3, 2003, for the Uni-President Lions

Last CPBL appearance
- September 28, 2024, for the Uni-President Lions

CPBL statistics
- Win–loss record: 149–109
- Earned run average: 3.61
- Strikeouts: 1,187
- Stats at Baseball Reference

Teams
- Uni-President Lions/Uni-President 7-Eleven Lions/Uni-President Lions (2003–2024)

Career highlights and awards
- 5x Taiwan Series champion (2008–2009, 2011, 2013, 2020); CPBL Rookie of the Year (2003)
Medals
Representing Chinese Taipei
Men's baseball
Intercontinental Cup
| Bronze medal – third place | 2006 Taichung | Team |
Asian Games
| Gold medal – first place | 2006 Doha | Team |
| Silver medal – second place | 2010 Guangzhou | Team |
Asian Baseball Championship
| Silver medal – second place | 2003 Sapporo | Team |
| Silver medal – second place | 2009 Sapporo | Team |

Pan Wei-lun (Chinese: 潘威倫; pinyin: Pān Wēilún; Wade–Giles: Pan^{1} Wei^{1} Lun^{2}; born 5 March 1982) is a Taiwanese former professional baseball pitcher. He played in the Chinese Professional Baseball League (CPBL) for the Uni-President Lions from 2003 to 2024.

== Career ==
After brief amateur career in the Taiwan Cooperative Bank baseball team he was drafted by the Uni-President Lions of the Chinese Professional Baseball League in early 2003 and remains with this team to date. He has been considered an ace for the Lions and has also been a key member of the Chinese Taipei national baseball team since 2002.

He held the CPBL record of pitcher with the longest winning streak by scoring 21 victories between March 1, 2007 and June 18, 2008. Furthermore, he scored his first career no-hitter on July 10, 2008 against Chinatrust Whales, but failed to achieve perfect game due to a fielding error by first baseman Kao Kuo-ching.

On February 14, 2024, the Lions announced that the 2024 season would be Pan's final season. In 11 games (4 starts) for the Lions, he struggled to a 1–6 record and 6.83 ERA with 8 strikeouts across 29 innings. Pan played in his final game on September 28 against the TSG Hawks, with the Lions losing 4-0. This game marked his retirement from professional baseball.

== International career ==
Pan represented Chinese Taipei in the 2004 Olympic Games. He, along with Wang Chien-Ming, were the only two Taiwanese pitchers to have wins in the tournament. He was credited with two wins.

Pan represented Chinese Taipei in the 2008 Olympic Games. He had no wins or losses in the tournament.

== Career statistics ==
| Year | Team | G | W | L | SV | H | IP | K | BB | HR | ERA |
|---|---|---|---|---|---|---|---|---|---|---|---|
| 2003 | Uni-President | 28 | 13 | 8 | 0 | 0 | 166.1 | 104 | 42 | 8 | 2.435 |
| 2004 | Uni-President | 29 | 12 | 8 | 0 | 0 | 176.1 | 122 | 31 | 12 | 2.144 |
| 2005 | Uni-President | 34 | 12 | 8 | 0 | 1 | 171.0 | 130 | 41 | 8 | 2.789 |
| 2006 | Uni-President | 26 | 14 | 9 | 0 | 0 | 182.0 | 106 | 21 | 6 | 2.473 |
| 2007 | Uni-President | 21 | 16 | 2 | 0 | 0 | 123.1 | 79 | 24 | 7 | 2.262 |
| 2008 | Uni-President | 18 | 12 | 2 | 0 | 0 | 111.0 | 87 | 16 | 5 | 2.757 |
| 2009 | Uni-President | 22 | 10 | 8 | 0 | 0 | 133.2 | 81 | 23 | 6 | 3.299 |
| 2010 | Uni-President | 29 | 11 | 11 | 0 | 0 | 191.2 | 101 | 24 | 7 | 3.193 |
| Total | | 177 | 100 | 56 | 0 | 1 | 1255.1 | 810 | 228 | 65 | 2.667 |

Last updated December 6, 2010
