= Uni-President 7-Eleven Lions =

Professional baseball team in Tainan City, Taiwan

Uni-President 7-ᴇʟᴇᴠᴇn Lions
- 統一7-ᴇʟᴇᴠᴇn獅
Logo
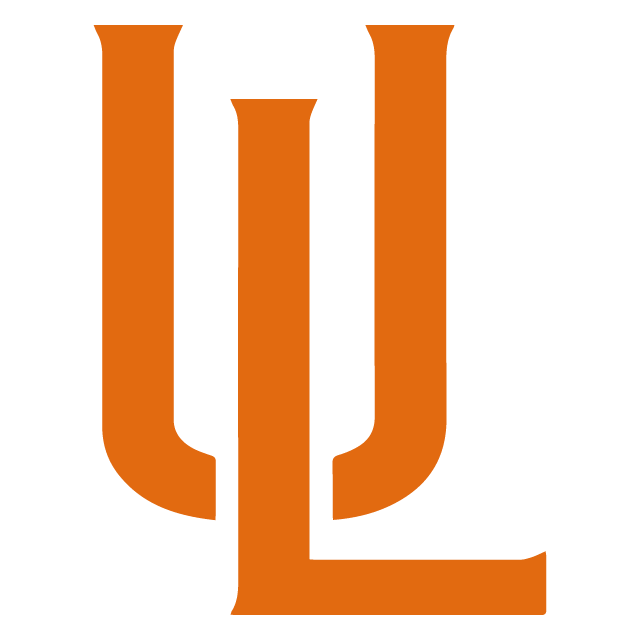
Cap insignia

Information
- League: Chinese Professional Baseball League
- Location: Tainan City
- Ballpark: Asia-Pacific International Baseball Training Centers
- Founded: 1989; 37 years ago
- Taiwan Series championships: 1991; 1995; 1996; 2000; 2007; 2008; 2009; 2011; 2013; 2020
- Playoff berths: 1991, 1993, 1996, 1998, 1999, 2000, 2001, 2004, 2005, 2006, 2007, 2008, 2009, 2011, 2012, 2013, 2017, 2018, 2020, 2021, 2023, 2024, 2025, 2026
- Former name: Uni-President (1989–1990); Uni-President Lions (1990–2007)
- Former ballpark: Tainan Municipal Baseball Stadium
- Mascot: Lion, Ying
- Retired numbers: 1, 22, 56
- Ownership: Uni-President Enterprises Corporation
- General manager: Su Tai-an
- Manager: Lin Yueh-ping
- Website: www.uni-lions.com.tw

Current uniforms
Home	Away

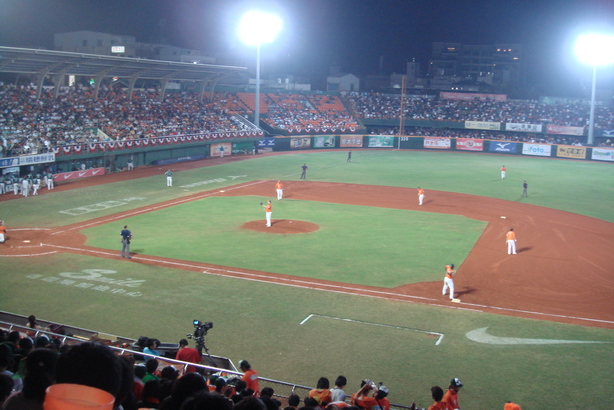
Tainan Municipal Baseball Stadium

Uni-President 7-Eleven Lions
- Traditional Chinese: 統一7-ᴇʟᴇᴠᴇn獅
- Simplified Chinese: 統一7-ᴇʟᴇᴠᴇn狮
Transcriptions
Standard Mandarin
- Hanyu Pinyin: Tǒngyī Shī
- Wade–Giles: T'ung-I Shih
- Tongyong Pinyin: Tǒngyī Shīh
- Yale Romanization: Tǔngyī Shr̄
- IPA: [tʰʊ̀ŋí ʂɻ̩́]
Southern Min
- Hokkien POJ: Thóng-it Sai

The Uni-President 7-Eleven Lions, stylized as Uni-President 7-ᴇʟᴇᴠᴇn Lions, also known as Uni-Lions (Chinese: 統一7-ᴇʟᴇᴠᴇn獅), are a professional baseball team playing in the Chinese Professional Baseball League (CPBL). The Lions are based in Tainan City, Taiwan and play their home games at Asia-Pacific International Baseball Training Centers.

The organization is owned by Uni-President Corporation, one of Taiwan's largest conglomerates, whose subsidiary Uni-President Baseball Team Company oversees operations of the team. The Lions are the only CPBL team owned by the same parent company and played continuously since CPBL's founding season in 1990.

== History ==
=== Amateur era ===
The team was first established as amateur Uni-President Baseball Team (Chinese: 統一棒球隊) in 1989 for the purpose of training and preparation for eventual professionalization in the next year. The corporation originally intended to recruit players from Taipower Baseball Team, an amateur baseball team based in nearby Kaohsiung, but faced many difficulties in the process.

Uni-President originally offered Lin Chia-hsiang (Chinese: 林家祥) the position of team manager, hoping that his status as Taipower's head coach would ensure players' willingness to join the new team. Lin accepted at first, and agreed to aid the effort of recruiting players. However, due to uncertainties in a professional career, players were reluctant to leave Taipower for the new team, and Lin could only secure a few players and was far below the 15 players minimum requirement of the amateur league. Lin then turned down the offer, leaving Uni-President searching for a replacement for the manager position. Uni-President eventually contacted Cheng Kuen-chi (Chinese: 鄭昆吉) and offered him the position. Cheng, a former coach of Taipower who was respected by many players, accepted the offer and became the first manager for Uni-President. Cheng then used his connection to convince players to join the team, and Uni-President barely met the minimum requirement after Brother baseball team lent players to Uni-President. The team then participated and performed modestly in two amateur series in 1989.

=== Early years ===
The team was professionalized on January 1, 1990, following the establishment of CPBL. Uni-President chose Lions as its mascot, and hence the team was renamed Uni-President Lions. The Lions played the opening game of CPBL on March 17, 1990 with Brother Elephants in the now demolished Taipei Municipal Baseball Stadium, defeated the Elephants, and scored their first victory in professional baseball. However, the Lions performed poorly in their first professional season, placed third and only saved by Brother Elephants's even poorer performance.

The season of 1991 saw significant improvements in the Lions' performance. The Lions were able to advance into the playoffs and play Wei Chuan Dragons, who they defeated four games to two and won their first title. The next three years saw the dominance of the Elephants, who won three consecutive seasonal titles from 1992 to 1994, and defeated the Lions in the 1993 playoffs. It was during these years that the Lions and Elephants developed a long-lasting rivalry. The Lions again won the titles in 1995 and 1996.

=== Black Eagles scandal and the 1997 season ===
The 1997 season was not smooth sailing as many has expected; the Lions started out losing some prominent players to the rival Taiwan Major League. Also, the game-fixing scandal in mid-season of 1997, known as the Black Eagles scandal, was a major blow to the CPBL in general in that the average attendance dropped significantly, and teams were either forced out of the market or had to scale back on the budget and shut down some expansion projects over the next few years.

Furthermore, at the end of 1997 season, the Lions led the league with 58–7–31, while the Dragons (46–4–46) and the Eagles (41–4–51) were placed third and fourth respectively. However, the regulation dictated that the playoffs should be played by the team that led the league in the first half-season and the team in the second half-season. It was assumed that if a team leads the league in the whole year, it should have placed first in both half-seasons, and thus allowed to participate in the championship series. The loophole became obvious when the Dragons, placed seventh in the first half but first in the second half, and the Eagles, placed first in the first half and seventh in the second half, got a berth in the playoffs. The loophole was fixed in the following year.

=== Present ===
The team was officially renamed Uni-President 7-Eleven Lions in 2008. 7-Eleven in Taiwan is franchised by President Chain Store Corporation, a subsidiary of Uni-President Enterprises Corporation.

== Organization ==
=== Minor league ===
The Lions were credited as the first organization to form a minor league team. As early as 1990, when CPBL was still in its early years, the Lions were making preparation for establishment of a second team by hiring coaches and scouting talented players for the project. The reserve team, however, was disbanded due to lack of opponent and players. In 1997, the Lions again formed a reserve team, but it met the same fate as its predecessor due to the game-fixing scandal and the decline in attendance. No further expansion was made until after the CPBL-TML merger took place.

In late 2003, after the merger of the two competing league, the Chinese Taipei Baseball Association assisted CPBL in forming a minor league by sending alternative service players to be trained by and filled the roster of member organizations of CPBL. The Lions were supportive of this project initially, but later backed out due to financial reasons. In early 2006, the Lions announced the revival of the minor league project, and began the expansion of the team. The roster consisted of reserve players, alternative service players, and non-contract players. Alternative service players and non-contract players are restricted to play exclusively on the second team. As of the 2013 season, the team is made up exclusively of contracted players.

=== Foreign cooperation ===
The Lions have been working with other organization in Asia and North America to improve the performance of the organization; collaborators includes Yomiuri Giants of NPB's Central League and Red Sox organization of MLB. Also, the Lions have participated in many friendly exhibition games with teams from other professional organizations.

=== Notable achievements ===
The Lions are the holders of many CPBL records. The most well-known is the winning streak of 17 games in the 2006 season. The Lions are currently holding the records as the team with the most wins, home runs, and Taiwan Series titles throughout its history.

== Records ==
Qualified for playoffs	Taiwan Series Championship

=== Regular seasons ===
Season	Wins	Losses	Ties	Winning pct.	Place
Uni-President Lions
1990	37 (16/21)	49 (29/20)	4 (0/4)	.430 (.356/.512)	3 (4/2)
1991	46 (21/25)	34 (20/14)	10 (4/6)	.575 (.512/.641)	1 (2/1)
1992	41 (20/21)	45 (23/22)	4 (2/2)	.477 (.465/.488)	3 (3/2)
1993	54 (25/29)	34 (20/14)	2 (0/2)	.614 (.556/.674)	1 (3/1)
1994	48 (22/26)	38 (20/18)	4 (3/1)	.558 (.524/.591)	2 (3/2)
1995	62 (32/30)	36 (17/19)	2 (1/1)	.633 (.653/.612)	1 (1/1)
1996	60 (34/26)	37 (15/22)	3 (1/2)	.619 (.694/.542)	1 (1/3)
1997	58 (28/30)	31 (16/15)	7 (4/3)	.652 (.636/.667)	1 (2/2)
1998	57	45	3	.563	2
1999	56	37	0	.602	2
2000	44 (17/27)	43 (27/16)	3 (1/2)	.506 (.386/.659)	2 (4/1)
2001	49 (27/22)	37 (14/23)	4 (4/0)	.570 (.659/.489)	1 (1/3)
2002	32 (18/14)	54 (24/30)	4 (3/1)	.372 (.429/.318)	4 (4/4)
2003	54 (24/30)	39 (23/16)	7 (3/4)	.581 (.511/.652)	3 (4/2)
2004	54 (28/26)	40 (18/22)	6 (4/2)	.574 (.543/.542)	1 (1/3)
2005	48 (24/24)	49 (26/23)	3 (0/3)	.495 (.480/.511)	3 (5/3)
2006	48 (28/20)	45 (18/27)	7 (4/3)	.516 (.609/.426)	2 (2/5)
2007	58 (27/31)	41 (23/18)	1 (0/1)	.586 (.540/.633)	1 (2/2)
Uni-President 7-Eleven Lions
2008	67 (34/33)	33 (16/17)	0 (0/0)	.670 (.680/.660)	1 (1/2)
2009	63 (34/29)	54 (24/30)	3 (2/1)	.538 (.586/.492)	1 (1/2)
2010	54 (25/29)	63 (34/29)	3 (1/2)	.462 (.424/.500)	3 (4/2)
2011	65 (37/28)	52 (22/30)	3 (1/2)	.556 (.627/.483)	2 (1/3)
2012	71 (41/30)	48 (19/29)	1 (0/1)	.597 (.683/.508)	1 (1/2)
2013	62 (30/32)	55 (29/26)	3 (1/2)	.530 (.508/.552)	1 (2/1)
2014	58 (32/26)	55 (24/31)	7 (4/3)	.513 (.571/.456)	2 (2/4)
2015	49 (26/23)	69 (33/36)	2 (1/1)	.415 (.441/.390)	4 (4/4)
2016	55 (29/26)	65 (31/34)	0 (0/0)	.458 (.483/.433)	3 (2/4)
2017	57 (23/34)	61 (35/26)	2 (2/0)	.483 (.397/.567)	2 (3/2)
2018	64 (35/29)	55 (25/30)	1 (0/1)	.538 (.583/.492)	2 (2/2)
2019	48 (25/23)	70 (34/36)	2 (1/1)	.407 (.424/.390)	4 (4/4)
2020	58 (26/32)	61 (34/27)	1 (0/1)	.487 (.433/.542)	3 (3/1)
2021	64 (32/32)	51 (26/25)	5 (2/3)	.557 (.552/.561)	2 (2/1)
2022	48 (31/17)	69 (27/42)	3 (2/1)	.410 (.534/.288)	4 (3/5)
2023	62 (34/28)	55 (24/31)	3 (2/1)	.530 (.586/.475)	2 (1/4)
2024	66 (37/29)	53 (23/30)	1 (0/1)	.555 (.617/.492)	2 (1/3)
2025	66 (36/30)	54 (24/30)	0 (0/0)	.550 (.600/.500)	2 (1/3)
2026	64 (30/34)	55 (29/26)	1 (1/0)	.538 (.508/.567)	2 (3/2)

=== Playoffs ===
Season	First round			Taiwan Series		
Season	Opponent	Wins	Losses	Opponent	Wins	Losses
Uni-President Lions
1991	Did not play			Wei Chuan Dragons	4	3
1993	Did not play			Brother Elephants	2	4
1995	No playoffs. The Lions won the championship by virtue of winning both half-seasons.					
1996	Did not play			Wei Chuan Dragons	4	2
1998	Wei Chuan Dragons	1	2	Eliminated		
1999	Wei Chuan Dragons	1	2	Eliminated		
2000	Did not play			Sinon Bulls	4	3
2001	Did not play			Brother Elephants	3	4
2004	Did not play			Sinon Bulls	3	4
2005	Macoto Cobras	1	3	Eliminated		
2006	Sinon Bulls	3	0	La New Bears	0	4
2007	Macoto Cobras	3	0	La New Bears	4	3
Uni-President 7-Eleven Lions
2008	Did not play			Brother Elephants	4	3
2009	Did not play			Brother Elephants	4	3
2011	Did not play			Lamigo Monkeys	4	1
2012	Did not play			Lamigo Monkeys	1	4
2013	Did not play			EDA Rhinos	4	0
2017	Chinatrust Brothers	1	3	Eliminated		
2018	Fubon Guardians	3	1	Lamigo Monkeys	2	4
2020	Did not play			CTBC Brothers	4	3
2021	Did not play			CTBC Brothers	0	4
2023	Rakuten Monkeys	1	3	Eliminated		
2024	Rakuten Monkeys	3	1	CTBC Brothers	1	4
2025	Rakuten Monkeys	2	3	Eliminated		
2026	CTBC Brothers	2	3	Eliminated		

=== Asia Series ===
Year	First stage			Championship round	
Year	Wins	Losses	Standing	Opponent	Result
Uni-President Lions
2007	1	2	3	Eliminated	
Uni-President 7-Eleven Lions
2008	2	1	2	Saitama Seibu Lions	0–1 (L)
2011	1	2	3	Eliminated	
2013	1	1	—	Canberra Cavalry	4–14 (L)

== Roster ==
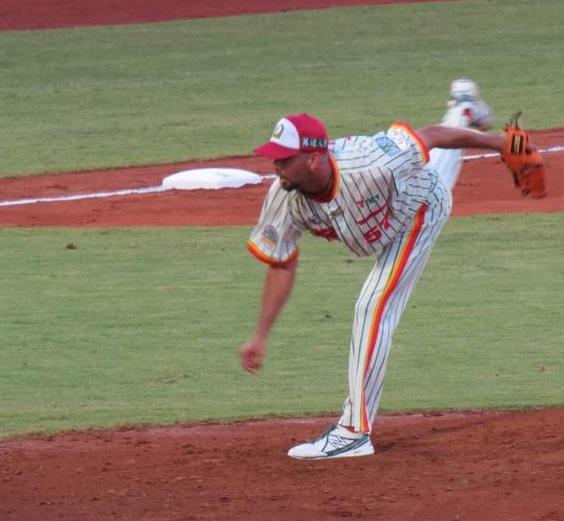
Nelson Figueroa played for the Lions in 2007 and between 2013 and 2014.

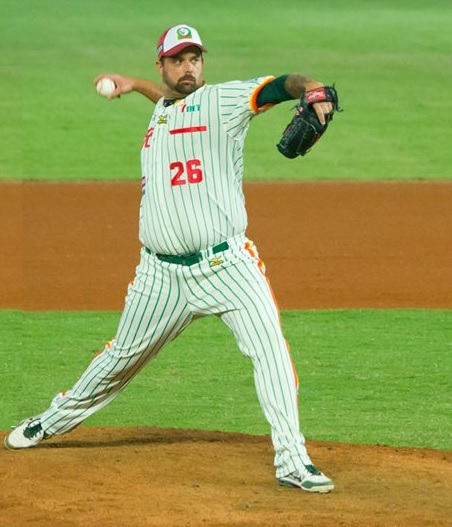
Boof Bonser played for the Lions between 2013 and 2014.

=== Current roster ===
Uni-President 7-Eleven Lions roster
Players			Coaches
Pitchers: 5 (Taiwan) Juan Yu-chih; 12 (Taiwan) Chen Yun-wen; 16 (Taiwan) Chang Yu-chien; 17 (Taiwan) Lin Tzu-wei; 19 (Taiwan) Lin Yuan-yu; 21 (Venezuela) Yohander Méndez; 23 (Taiwan) Liu Hsuan-ta; 26 (Taiwan) Liu Yu-cheng; 28 (Taiwan) Masaki Takashio; 29 (Taiwan) Chung Yun-hua; 30 (Taiwan) Lee Chi-feng; 33 (Taiwan) Cheng Hao; 37 (Taiwan) Chiu Hao-chun; 40 (Taiwan) Huang Chun-yen; 41 (Taiwan) Wang Ching-ming; 42 (Dominican Republic) Cristopher Crisostomo; 43 (United States) Joe Wieland; 45 (Taiwan) Chou Yen-nung; 48 (Taiwan) Zheng Fu-hao; 50 (Canada) Brock Dykxhoorn; 53 (Taiwan) Lin Yi-ting; 57 (Taiwan) Wu Cheng-yu; 58 (Taiwan) Hu Chih-wei; 59 (Taiwan) Yang Chiang-sen; 60 (Taiwan) Cheng Chun-jen; 62 (Taiwan) Lee Chun; 69 (Taiwan) Xin Jun-sheng; 73 (Taiwan) Li Jia-xiang; 74 (Taiwan) Lin Shao-en; 75 (Taiwan) Kuo Chun-lin; 79 (Taiwan) Yao Chieh-hung; 84 (Taiwan) Yin Po-huai; 86 (Taiwan) Lee Cheng-hung; 90 (Taiwan) Yang Meng-yuan; 93 (Dominican Republic) Félix Peña; 95 (Taiwan) Chiang Cheng-feng	Catchers: 4 (Taiwan) Chang Hsiang; 31 (Taiwan) Lin Dai-an; 36 (Taiwan) Ko Yu-min; 46 (Taiwan) Chang Sheng-hao; 54 (Taiwan) Pan Lei; 65 (Taiwan) Chen Chung-yu; 78 (Taiwan) Yu Yi-hsien; Infielders: 2 (Taiwan) Lin Tzu-hao; 7 (Taiwan) Ho Heng-yu; 9 (Taiwan) Yang Chun-siang; 10 (Taiwan) Hsu Che-yen; 13 (Taiwan) Mayaw Ciru; 15 (Taiwan) Chen Sheng-ping; 25 (Taiwan) Lin Pei-wei; 27 (Taiwan) Chuan Shao-kai; 35 (Taiwan) Pan Chieh-kai; 38 (Taiwan) Ghang Hao-wei; 39 (Taiwan) Lin Tzu-chieh; 64 (Taiwan) Lin Ching-kai; 66 (Taiwan) Chen Chung-ting; 67 (Taiwan) Lin Hong-xian; 99 (Taiwan) Lin Yi-chuan	Outfielders: 6 (Taiwan) Li Cheng-ling; 8 (Taiwan) Chu Chia-en; 14 (Taiwan) Chiu Chih-cheng; 20 (Taiwan) Lin Chia-wei; 24 (Taiwan) Chen Chieh-hsien; 32 (Taiwan) Su Chih-chieh; 49 (Taiwan) Tien Tzu-chieh; 51 (Taiwan) Hu Chin-lung; 52 (Taiwan) Chang Wei-sheng; 63 (Taiwan) Chen Wei-hsiang; 77 (Taiwan) Lin An-ko	Manager: 11 (Taiwan) Lin Yueh-ping; Coaches: 22 (United States) Justin Mashore (hitting); 34 (Taiwan) Kao Chih-kang (bench); 55 (Taiwan) Pan Wu-hsiung (hitting); 70 (Taiwan) Chou Kuang-sheng (infield); 71 (Taiwan) Lo Ching-lung (bullpen); 76 (Japan) Tomotaka Tamaki (infield); 80 (Taiwan) Chuang Chun-kai (outfield/base running); 82 (Taiwan) Chen Chun-hui (battery); 94 (Taiwan) Wu Ping-hsuan (strength); 96 (Taiwan) Kuo Chun-yu (hitting/base running); 98 (Canada) Vince Horsman (pitching); Second team manager: 92 (Taiwan) Liu Yu-chen; Second team coaches: 3 (Taiwan) Tang Chao-ting (hitting); 18 (Taiwan) Pan Wei-lun (pitching); 47 (Taiwan) Lai Bo-kai (pitching); 61 (Taiwan) Chu Yuan-chin (outfield/base running); 68 (Taiwan) Kao Kuo-ching (bench); 72 (Taiwan) Kao Cheng-hua (strength and conditioning); 81 (Taiwan) Cheng Po-jen (pitching); 89 (Taiwan) Lin Wei (battery); 91 (Taiwan) Chuang Ching-he (fielding); 97 (Taiwan) Fu Yu-kang (training faculty); Roster updated on 27 March 2025

=== Retired numbers ===
- 22 (Taiwan) Tseng Chih-chen
- 56 (Taiwan) Liu Fu-hao

=== List of managers ===
No.	Name	Years	Playoffs	Championships
1	Cheng Kuen-chi	1990–1993	2	1
2	Yataro Oishi	1994–1996	2	2
3	Lin Chia-hsiang	1997–1998	1	0
Acting	Yukihiko Machida	1997	—	
Acting	Osamu Inoue	1998	—	
4	Tseng Chih-chen	1999–2002	3	1
Acting	Masashi Takenouchi	2000	—	
5	Hsieh Chang-heng	2003–2005	1	0
6	Yutaka Ohashi	2005–2007	2	0
Acting	Lo Kuo-chong	2007	—	
7	Lu Wen-sheng	2007–2011	4	4
8	Nakajima Terushi	2012–2013	1	0
Acting	Lo Kuo-chong	2013	—	
9	Chen Lien-hung	2013–2015	1	1
10	Kuo Tai-yuan	2016	0	0
11	Huang Kan-lin	2017–2019	2	0
Acting	Hsu Sheng-chieh	2018	—	
Acting	Liu Yu-chen	2019	—	
12	Lin Yueh-ping	2020–present	6	1
Acting	Kao Chih-kang	2022	—	
