= List of CPBL Manager of the Year Award =

Accordance with the Chinese Professional Baseball League current rules, the best head coach to win the overall championship awarded to the team's head coach, head coach of the Taiwan Major League winner of the best all media correspondent vote.

== List of winners ==
Year	Manager	Chinese name	Team	Wins	Losses	Ties	Pct.	Rank
1990	(Taiwan) Sung Huan-hsun	宋宦勳	Wei Chuan Dragons	52	34	4	0.605	1
1991	(Taiwan) Cheng Kun-chi	鄭昆吉	Uni-President Lions	46	34	10	0.575	1
1992	(Japan) Nobushige Morishita	森下正夫	Brother Elephants	51	35	4	0.593	1
1993	(Japan) Yamane Toshihide	山根俊英	Brother Elephants	52	36	2	0.591	2
1994	(Japan) Yamane Toshihide	山根俊英	Brother Elephants	64	24	2	0.727	1
1995	(Japan) Oishi Yataro	大石彌太郎	Uni-President Lions	62	36	2	0.633	1
1996	(Japan) Oishi Yataro	大石彌太郎	Uni-President Lions	60	37	3	0.619	1
1997	(Taiwan) Hsu Sheng-ming	徐生明	Wei Chuan Dragons	46	46	4	0.500	4
1998	(Taiwan) Hsu Sheng-ming	徐生明	Wei Chuan Dragons	56	48	1	0.538	3
1999	(Taiwan) Hsu Sheng-ming	徐生明	Wei Chuan Dragons	49	39	4	0.557	3
2000	(Taiwan) Tseng Chih-chen	曾智偵	Uni-President Lions	44	43	3	0.506	2
2001	(Taiwan) Lin Yi-tseng	林易增	Brother Elephants	44	39	7	0.530	2
2002	(Taiwan) Lin Yi-tseng	林易增	Brother Elephants	53	33	4	0.616	1
2003	(Taiwan) Lin Yi-tseng	林易增	Brother Elephants	63	31	6	0.670	1
2004	(Taiwan) Liu Jung-hua	劉榮華	Sinon Bulls	52	43	5	0.547	2
2005	(Taiwan) Liu Jung-hua	劉榮華	Sinon Bulls	53	42	6	0.558	1
2006	(Taiwan) Hung I-chung	洪一中	La New Bears	62	34	4	0.646	1
2007	(Taiwan) Lu Wen-sheng	呂文生	Uni-President Lions	58	41	1	0.586	1
2008	(Taiwan) Lu Wen-sheng	呂文生	Uni-President 7-Eleven Lions	67	33	0	0.670	1
2009	(Taiwan) Lu Wen-sheng	呂文生	Uni-President 7-Eleven Lions	63	54	3	0.538	1
2010	(Taiwan) Chen Jui-chen	陳瑞振	Brother Elephants	61	57	2	0.517	2
2011	(Taiwan) Lu Wen-sheng	呂文生	Uni-President 7-Eleven Lions	65	52	3	0.556	2
2012	(Taiwan) Hung I-chung	洪一中	Lamigo Monkeys	66	52	2	0.559	2
2013	(Taiwan) Chen Lien-hung	陳連宏	Uni-President 7-Eleven Lions	62	55	3	0.530	1
2014	(Taiwan) Hung I-chung	洪一中	Lamigo Monkeys	66	51	3	0.564	1
2015	(Taiwan) Hung I-chung	洪一中	Lamigo Monkeys	68	52	0	0.567	1
2016	(Taiwan) Yeh Chun-chang	葉君璋	EDA Rhinos	61	58	1	0.513	2
2017	(Taiwan) Hung I-chung	洪一中	Lamigo Monkeys	78	41	1	0.655	1
2018	(Taiwan) Hung I-chung	洪一中	Lamigo Monkeys	73	47	0	0.608	1
2019	(Taiwan) Hung I-chung	洪一中	Lamigo Monkeys	63	55	2	0.534	2
2020	(Taiwan) Lin Yueh-ping	林岳平	Uni-President 7-Eleven Lions	58	61	1	0.487	3
2021	(Taiwan) Lin Wei-chu	林威助	CTBC Brothers	66	49	5	0.574	1
2022	(Taiwan) Lin Wei-chu	林威助	CTBC Brothers	69	47	4	0.595	2
2023	(Taiwan) Yeh Chun-chang	葉君璋	Wei Chuan Dragons	62	53	5	0.539	1
2024	(Japan) Keiichi Hirano	平野惠一	CTBC Brothers	70	50	0	0.583	1
2025	(Japan) Kenji Furukubo	古久保健二	Rakuten Monkeys	62	57	1	0.521	3

== See also ==
- Baseball awards § Taiwan
