= 2008 Taiwan Series =

- 2008 Taiwan Series logo
Team (Wins)	Managers	Season
Uni-President 7-Eleven Lions (4)	Lu Wen-sheng	67-0-33, .670
Brother Elephants (3)	Wang Kuang-hui	52-4–42, .553
- Dates: October 25–November 2
- MVP: Luther Hackman
- Outstanding Players: Pan Wei-lun; Wang Jin-yong
- Manager of the Year: Lu Wen-sheng

Broadcast
- Television: Videoland Television Network

The 2008 Taiwan Series was played by the Uni-President 7-Eleven Lions, team that placed first in the all-season standing, and the Brother Elephants, wild card winner who advanced to Taiwan Series by defeating La New Bears in the Playoff Series. The Lions defeated the Elephants four games to three and won the title and went on to represent Taiwan in the 2008 Asia Series.

== Participants ==
- Uni-President 7-Eleven Lions - First seed; winner of the first half-season.
- La New Bears - Second seed; winner of the second half-season.
- Brother Elephants - Third seed; wild card winner by virtue of placing third in all-season standing after the Lions and the Bears.

== Rules ==
All regular season rules apply with the following exceptions:

- Each team is allowed to register 28 players on its active roster.
- No tied games.
- Two outfield umpires are added to the games.

== Summaries ==
Playoff Series			Taiwan Series
			1	Uni-President 7-Eleven Lions	4
2	La New Bears	0	3	Brother Elephants	3
3	Brother Elephants	3

=== Game 1 ===
October 25, 2008 at Tainan Municipal Baseball Stadium, Tainan City

Team	1	2	3	4	5	6	7	8	9	R	H	E
Brother	0	0	0	2	0	1	2	0	4	9	15	2
Uni-President 7-Eleven	1	0	0	1	0	0	0	0	1	3	14	1
WP: Liao Yu-cheng (1–0) LP: Luther Hackman (0–1); Home runs: BRO: Wang Jin-yong (1); UNI: None; Attendance: 12,000

=== Game 2 ===
October 26, 2008 at Chengcing Lake Baseball Field, Niaosong, Kaohsiung County

Team	1	2	3	4	5	6	7	8	9	R	H	E
Brother	0	0	0	0	3	0	0	1	0	4	7	3
Uni-President 7-Eleven	3	0	0	0	0	2	0	0	0	5	8	0
WP: Pan Wei-lun (1–0) LP: Ryokan Kobayashi (0–1) Sv: Lin Yueh-ping (1); Home runs: BRO: Lin Ming-hsien (1), Wang Jin-yong (2); UNI: None; Attendance: 17,523

=== Game 3 ===
October 28, 2008 at Taichung Intercontinental Baseball Stadium, Taichung City

Team	1	2	3	4	5	6	7	8	9	R	H	E
Uni-President 7-Eleven	0	0	0	0	0	0	2	3	0	5	6	1
Brother	0	3	0	1	0	2	0	0	0	6	8	1
WP: Mai Chia-je (1–0) LP: Giancarlo Alvarado (0–1) Sv: Tsao Chun-yang (1); Home runs: UNI: Tilson Brito (1), Chen Lien-hung (1); BRO: None; Attendance: 18,302

=== Game 4 ===
October 29, 2008 at Xinzhuang Baseball Stadium, Taipei County

Team	1	2	3	4	5	6	7	8	9	R	H	E
Uni-President 7-Eleven	0	0	4	0	0	0	2	0	1	5	7	1
Brother	0	0	0	0	0	0	0	0	0	0	4	0
WP: Luther Hackman (1–1) LP: Danny Core (0–1); Attendance: 12,500

=== Game 5 ===
October 30, 2008 at Xinzhuang Baseball Stadium, Taipei County

Team	1	2	3	4	5	6	7	8	9	R	H	E
Uni-President 7-Eleven	0	0	0	0	0	0	2	3	0	5	6	1
Brother	0	3	0	1	0	2	0	0	0	6	8	1
WP: Pan Wei-lun (2–0) LP: Liao Yu-cheng (0–1); Attendance: 12,500

=== Game 6 ===
November 1, 2008 at Tainan Municipal Baseball Stadium, Tainan City

Team	1	2	3	4	5	6	7	8	9	R	H	E
Brother	0	0	0	0	0	0	0	5	0	5	11	0
Uni-President 7-Eleven	0	0	0	0	0	0	0	0	0	0	7	1
WP: Matt Perisho (1–0) LP: Giancarlo Alvarado (0–2); Home runs: BRO: Wang Jin-yong (3); UNI: None; Attendance: 12,000

=== Game 7 ===
November 2, 2008 at Tainan Municipal Baseball Stadium, Tainan City

Team	1	2	3	4	5	6	7	8	9	R	H	E
Brother	0	0	0	0	0	0	0	0	0	0	4	1
Uni-President 7-Eleven	0	0	2	0	2	0	0	0	0	4	6	1
WP: Luther Hackman (2–1) LP: Mai Chia-je (1–1); Home runs: BRO: None; UNI: Chen Lien-hung (2); Attendance: 12,000
