= List of CPBL stolen bases champions =

Chinese Professional Baseball League recognizes stolen base champions each season.

== Champions ==
Year	Player	Team	Stolen bases
1990	(Taiwan) Lin Yi-tseng (林易增)	Wei Chuan Dragons	34
1991	(Taiwan) Lin Yi-tseng (林易增)	Wei Chuan Dragons	31
1992	(Taiwan) Lin Yi-tseng (林易增)	Brother Elephants	47
1993	(Taiwan) Lin Yi-tseng (林易增)	Brother Elephants	41
1994	(Taiwan) Lin Yi-tseng (林易增)	Brother Elephants	33
1995	(Taiwan) Chang Yaw-Teing (張耀騰)	China Times Eagles	45
1996	(Dominican Republic) César Hernández (賀亮德C.D.)	Uni-President Lions	36
1997	(Dominican Republic) Bernie Tatís (大帝士B.T.)	Wei Chuan Dragons	71
1998	(Dominican Republic) Bernie Tatís (大帝士B.T.)	Wei Chuan Dragons	65
1999	(Taiwan) Huang Kan-lin (黃甘霖)	Uni-President Lions	54
2000	(Taiwan) Huang Kan-lin (黃甘霖)	Uni-President Lions	42
2001	(Taiwan) Huang Kan-lin (黃甘霖)	Uni-President Lions	40
2002	(Taiwan) Huang Kan-lin (黃甘霖)	Uni-President Lions	42
2003	(Taiwan) Huang Kan-lin (黃甘霖)	Uni-President Lions	49
2004	(Taiwan) Cheng Chou-hang (鄭兆行)	Sinon Bulls	31
2005	(Taiwan) Yang Sen (陽 森)	Uni-President Lions	25
2006	(Taiwan) Yu Hsien-ming (余賢明)	Sinon Bulls	27
2007	(Taiwan) Huang Lung-yi (黃龍義)	La New Bears	27
2008	(Taiwan) Wang Seng-wei (王勝偉)	Brother Elephants	24
2009	(Taiwan) Wang Seng-wei (王勝偉)	Brother Elephants	42
2010	(Taiwan) Cheng Da-hong (鄭達鴻)	Sinon Bulls	31
2011	(Taiwan) Chang Cheng-Wei (張正偉)	Brother Elephants	33
2012	(Taiwan) Chang Chih-Hao (張志豪)	Brother Elephants	22
2012	(Taiwan) Chang Cheng-wei (張正偉)	Brother Elephants	22
2013	(Taiwan) Wang Sheng Wei (王勝偉)	Brother Elephants	29
2014	(Taiwan) Lin Chih-Ping (林智平)	Lamigo Monkeys	31
2015	(Taiwan) Lin Chih-Ping (林智平)	Lamigo Monkeys	32
2016	(Taiwan) Lin Chih-Ping (林智平)	Lamigo Monkeys	26
2017	(Taiwan) Wang Sheng-Wei (王勝偉)	Chinatrust Brothers	20
2018	(Taiwan) Wang Wei-chen (王威晨)	Chinatrust Brothers	44
2019	(Taiwan) Wang Wei-chen (王威晨)	Chinatrust Brothers	27
2020	(Taiwan) Chen Chen-Wei (陳晨威)	Rakuten Monkeys	42
2021	(Taiwan) Lin Li (林 立)	Rakuten Monkeys	27
2022	(Taiwan) Chen Chen-Wei (陳晨威)	Rakuten Monkeys	38
2023	(Taiwan) Chen Chen-Wei (陳晨威)	Rakuten Monkeys	22
2024	(Taiwan) Chen Chen-Wei (陳晨威)	Rakuten Monkeys	30
2025	(Taiwan) Li-Kai Wei (李凱威)	Wei Chuan Dragons	28
2026	(Taiwan) Chang Cheng-Yu (張政禹)	Wei Chuan Dragons	33
