= Lin Yi-tseng =

Taiwanese baseball player and manager

- Outfielder / Manager
- Born: December 2, 1959 (age 65); Kaohsiung, Taiwan
- Batted: Right Threw: Right

CPBL debut
- March 17, 1990, for the Wei Chuan Dragons

Last CPBL appearance
- March 17, 2001, for the Brother Elephants

CPBL statistics
- Batting average: .277
- Home runs: 23
- Stolen bases: 290
- Runs batted in: 243
- Managerial record: 259–190
- Winning %: .577

Teams
- As player: Wei Chuan Dragons (1990–1991); Brother Elephants (1992–2001); As manager: Brother Elephants (2001–2005)

Career highlights and awards
- 7x Taiwan Series champion (1990, 1992, 1993, 1994, 2001, 2002, 2003); CPBL hits champion (1990); 5x CPBL stolen bases champion (1990, 1991, 1992, 1993, 1994); 10x CPBL All-Star (1990–1998, 2000); 3x CPBL Manager of the Year) (2001–2003)

Lin Yi-tseng (Chinese: 林易增; Wade–Giles: Lin^{2} Yi^{4}-tseng^{1}; born 2 December 1959) is a Taiwanese former professional baseball player and manager in Taiwan's Chinese Professional Baseball League (CPBL). With 290 stolen bases during his playing career, Lin was nicknamed daozong (Chinese: 盜總) when he became manager of the Brother Elephants in 2001. From 2001 to 2005, he was the Brothers manager and guided the team to three consecutive Taiwan Series championships.

== Early life and education ==
Born in Kaohsiung, Taiwan, Lin attended I-Ning Senior High School in Taichung and Chinese Culture University in Taipei.

== Playing career ==
In 1992, the Wei Chuan Dragons traded Lin and Chen Yen-cheng to the Brother Elephants for former Yomiuri Giants player and CPBL No. 1 draft pick Lu Min-su, consummating the first trade in CPBL history.

== Brother Elephants manager (2001–2005) ==
After going 1–5 to start the 2001 season, the Brother Elephants announced that Lin Yi-tseng would replace Lin Pai-heng (Chinese: 林百亨) as manager. Lin eventually led the team to a championship that season and then two more consecutive championships after that.

== Post-CPBL career ==
After his retirement from the CPBL, Lin coached baseball at Da Ping Elementary School in Hengchun, Pingtung County. In September 2013, Lin started coaching for the University of Kang Ning baseball team, leading the team to No. 6 in the country.

== Personal life ==
Lin's son Lin Ken-wei (Chinese: 林根緯) played for the Taiwan Power Company baseball team, and his grandsons currently play youth baseball. His daughter is a real estate agent in Luzhou District, New Taipei. Lin collects jade and enjoys chadao. In 2003, he quit smoking after starting at age 22.

== See also ==
- Sandy Guerrero
