= Wang Sheng-wei =

Taiwanese baseball player (born 1984)

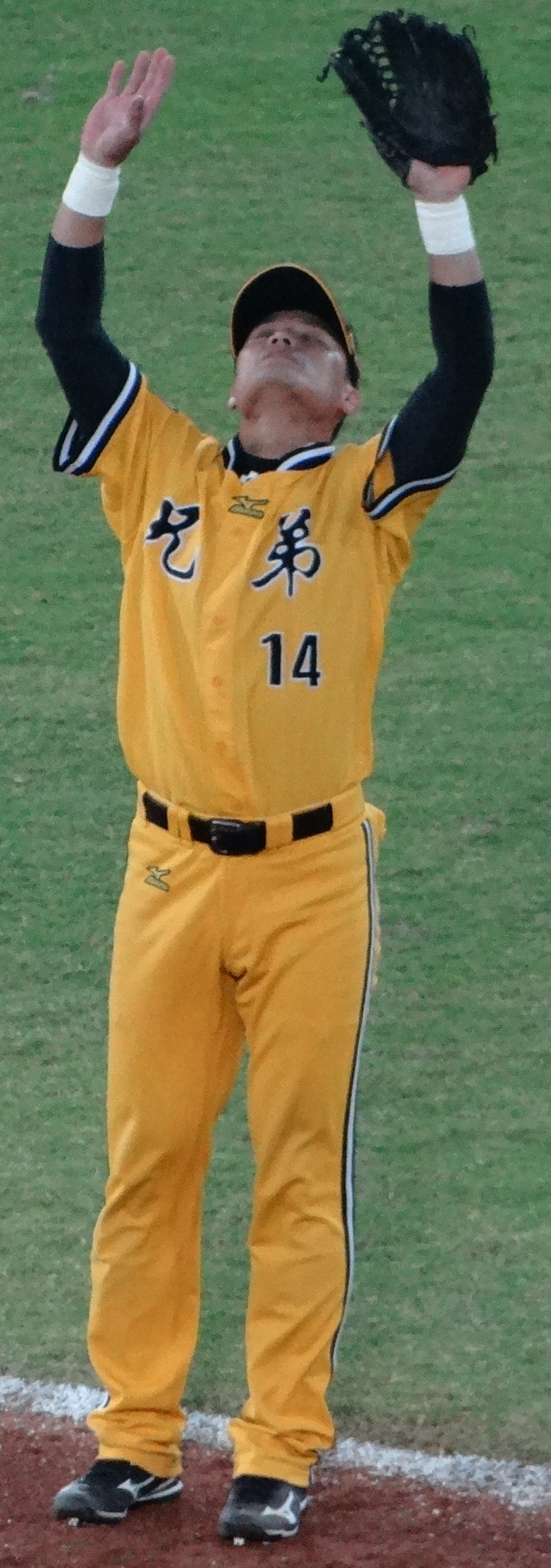
- Wang with the CTBC Brothers in 2015

Fubon Guardians – No. 3
- Shortstop
- Born: April 1, 1984 (age 42); Taiwan
- Bats: Right Throws: Right

CPBL debut
- March 19, 2008, for the Brother Elephants

CPBL statistics (through 2025 season)
- Batting average: .271
- Hits: 1,407
- Home runs: 60
- Runs batted in: 586
- Stolen bases: 241
- Stats at Baseball Reference

Teams
- Brother Elephants / Chinatrust Brothers / CTBC Brothers (2008–2021); Fubon Guardians (2022–present)

Career highlights and awards
- 2x Taiwan Series champion (2010, 2021); Stolen Bases leader (2008–2009, 2013, 2017); CPBL Gold Glove (2008, 2010–2012, 2014–2017, 2019); CPBL Best Ten (2010–2011, 2013); CPBL Comeback Player of the Year (2022)

Wang Sheng-wei (Chinese: 王勝偉; pinyin: Wáng Shèngwěi; Wade–Giles: Wang^{2} Sheng^{4} Wei^{3}; born April 1, 1984 in Taiwan), nicknamed "Magneto" and known as Haro Ngayaw in Amis language, is a Taiwanese professional baseball shortstop for the Fubon Guardians of the Chinese Professional Baseball League (CPBL). He holds the record for most Gold Gloves by any CPBL player with nine.

== Career ==
In 2005, he played for the Anchorage Bucs of the Alaska Baseball League.

In 2008, he was signed by the CTBC Brothers. That year he led the league in stolen bases with 24 and earned the Stolen Bases Award. In the same season, he was hit by 19 pitches, which was the single season record at the time.

In 2009, he improved his performance by raising his batting average to .305, and he recorded 42 stolen bases to lead the league in the stat for the second year in a row.

In 2017, he reached 100 hit by pitches, tying the record that was then held by Chen Je-chang. He would hold this record for a short time, eventually being overtaken by Lin Hung-yu.

He played with the Brothers through 2021, though after a 2021 season that saw him get minimal playtime he signed with the Fubon Guardians in early 2022.

Wang represented Chinese Taipei national baseball team at the 2004 Haarlem Baseball Week, 2005 Asian Baseball Championship, 2005 Baseball World Cup, 2006 Haarlem Baseball Week, 2006 World University Baseball Championship, 2008 Olympics qualifying tournament, 2009 World Baseball Classic, 2012 Asian Baseball Championship, 2017 World Baseball Classic. 2018 MLB Japan All-Star Series, and the 2019 WBSC Premier12.

== Career statistics ==
Season	Team	G	AB	H	HR	RBI	R	SB	SO	BB	TB	GDP	AVG	OBP	SLG	OPS
2008	Brothers Elephants	97	381	98	2	36	61	24	58	32	129	11	0.257	0.344	0.339	0.683
2009	Brothers Elephants	106	387	118	7	56	73	42	57	43	169	7	0.305	0.387	0.437	0.824
2010	Brothers Elephants	118	456	110	2	57	52	19	71	23	150	6	0.241	0.289	0.329	0.618
2011	Brothers Elephants	116	398	112	1	38	52	7	66	29	136	9	0.281	0.341	0.342	0.683
2012	Brothers Elephants	120	428	122	6	67	76	15	79	40	167	6	0.285	0.350	0.390	0.740
2013	Brothers Elephants	117	430	107	2	44	59	29	87	23	137	11	0.249	0.298	0.319	0.617
2014	Chinatown Brothers	108	343	87	0	21	36	21	58	17	103	10	0.254	0.305	0.300	0.605
2015	Chinatown Brothers	114	378	110	6	40	62	16	46	17	146	8	0.291	0.333	0.386	0.719
2016	Chinatown Brothers	106	377	113	5	53	76	3	45	32	158	8	0.300	0.365	0.419	0.784
2017	Chinatown Brothers	98	312	83	2	29	58	20	46	23	112	7	0.266	0.325	0.359	0.684
2018	Chinatown Brothers	66	229	65	10	33	46	5	47	19	118	4	0.284	0.352	0.515	0.867
2019	Chinatown Brothers	109	330	84	11	41	47	8	72	20	142	9	0.255	0.314	0.430	0.744
2020	CTBC Brothers	30	67	18	1	5	10	4	19	11	19	2	0.269	0.375	0.343	0.605
2021	CTBC Brothers	5	9	0	0	1	3	0	3	1	0	0	0.000	0.182	0.000	0.182
2022	Fubon Guardians	95	322	96	2	27	37	12	63	28	118	2	0.298	0.365	0.366	0.731
Total	15 years	1405	4847	1323	57	548	748	225	817	358	1690	100	0.273	0.336	0.373	0.709
