= 2010 Taiwan Series =

Team (Wins)	Managers	Season
Brother Elephants (4)	Chen Je-cheng	61-2-57, .517
Sinon Bulls (0)	Hsu Sheng-ming	65-2-53, .551
- Dates: October 16–October 23
- MVP: Jim Magrane
- Outstanding Players: Chang Cheng-wei; Chang Chien-ming
- Manager of the Year: Chen Je-cheng

Broadcast
- Television: Videoland Television Network

The 2010 Taiwan Series in the Taiwan Professional Baseball League was played between Brother Elephants and Sinon Bulls, winners of the first and second half-seasons, respectively. The Elephants won the title by defeating the Bulls in four games in the best-of-seven series. The games were held between October 16 and 23 at the Taichung Intercontinental Baseball Stadium, Douliu Baseball Stadium, Taoyuan International Baseball Stadium (since renamed the Rakuten International Baseball Stadium) and Xinzhuang Baseball Stadium.

The Brother Elephants swept the Sinon Bulls, winning 3–2, 3–1, 3-0 and 6–1, with commanding performances from their three starting pitchers--James Eugene Magrane and Carlos Castillo from the United States and Orlando Roman from Puerto Rico. This marked the seventh Taiwan baseball championship for the Elephants.

== Participants ==
- Sinon Bulls - Winner of the first half-season.
- Brother Elephants - Winner of the second half-season.

== Rules ==
All regular season rules applied with the following exceptions:

- Each team was allowed to register 28 players on its active roster.
- No tied games.
- Two outfield umpires were added to the games.
