= Stolen base percentage =

Baseball statistic

Stolen base percentage is a statistic used in baseball.

A player's stolen base percentage (a.k.a. SB%) measures his rate of success in stealing bases. Because stolen bases tend to help a team less than times caught stealing hurt, a player needs to have a high stolen base percentage in order to contribute much value to his team. A commonly used figure is that a player needs to succeed about 3/4 of the time to break even.

With 300 minimum career attempts, Carlos Beltrán currently holds the record for highest Stolen base percentage in the Major Leagues, with .864, with Tim Raines in second, with .847.

Total Baseball developed a statistic related to stolen base percentage called "Stolen Base Runs" or SBR. (.3 x Stolen Bases) - (.6 x Caught Stealing) This Total Baseball statistic is aimed at quantifying base-stealing. Numerous statistical studies done by Total Baseball have shown that the break even success rate for steals (the rate at which an attempt to steal is neither helping nor hurting the team in terms of total runs scored) is about 67%. Each successful steal adds approximately .3 runs to a team's total runs scored which is much less than often believed. Therefore, the statistic is meant to estimate the impact of base-stealers, which, other than the elite base-stealers, rarely amounts to more than a few runs per year for each team.

== See also ==
- List of Major League Baseball stolen base records - includes career and season records for stolen base percentage
- List of CPBL stolen bases champions
