= Tseng Chia-min =

Taiwanese baseball player

- Pitcher
- Born: May 7, 1983 (age 42); Taoyuan, Taiwan
- Bats: Right Throws: Right

CPBL debut
- March 20, 2008, for the Brother Elephants

Career statistics (through 2008)
- Record: 6-6
- Holds: 2
- ERA: 4.26
- Strikeouts: 65
- Stats at Baseball Reference

Teams
- Brother Elephants (2008–2009)

Tseng Chia-min (Chinese: 曾嘉敏; born May 7, 1983, in Taiwan) is a former Taiwanese professional baseball player for Brother Elephants of the Chinese Professional Baseball League (CPBL). His cousin, Chen Chih-yuan(陳致遠), is also former professional baseball player.

== Career statistics ==
Season	Team	G	W	L	HD	SV	CG	SHO	BB	SO	ER	INN	ERA
2008	Brother Elephants	27	6	6	2	0	0	0	55	65	39	82.1	4.26
Total	1year	27	6	6	2	0	0	0	55	65	39	82.1	4.26
