= Wang Kuang-hui =

Taiwanese baseball player (1964–2021)

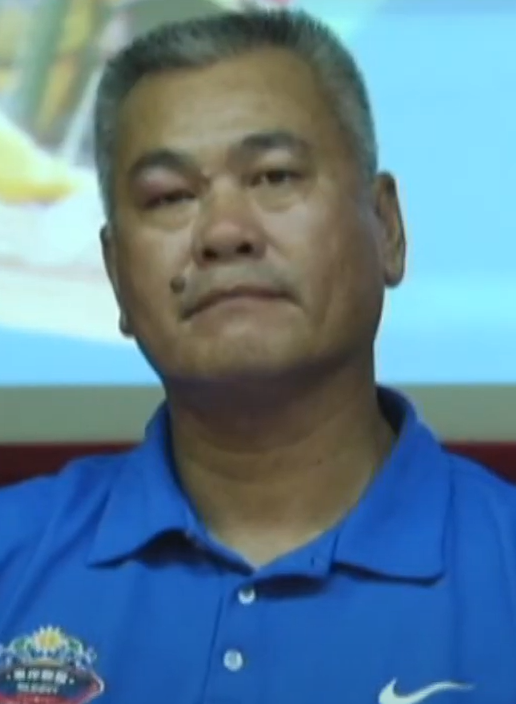
- Wang in 2017
- First baseman
- Born: 12 November 1964; Hualien County, Taiwan
- Died: 30 August 2021 (aged 56); Taipei, Taiwan
- Batted: Right Threw: Right

CPBL debut
- March 17, 1990, for the Brother Elephants

Career statistics
- Batting average: .285
- Hits: 1009
- Home runs: 91
- Runs batted in: 524
- Stolen bases: 42
- Stats at Baseball Reference

Teams
- As player: Brother Elephants (1990–2004); As coach: Brother Elephants (2002–2006); As manager: Brother Elephants (2007–2009)

Wang Kuang-hui (Chinese: 王光輝; pinyin: Wáng Guānghuī; Wade–Giles: Wang^{2} Kuang^{1} Hui^{1}; 12 November 1964 – 30 August 2021) was a Taiwanese professional baseball player and coach. He spent his entire playing and coaching career in the Chinese Professional Baseball League with the Brother Elephants franchise.

== Career ==
Wang joined the Brother Hotel amateur baseball team in 1988. Wang won the batting champion in the Chinese Professional Baseball League's inaugural 1990 season. In middle of the 2004 season, he retired as a player. Over the course of his career, Wang appeared in twelve straight all-star games, and won the Gold Glove Award three times. Wang began his coaching career as a hitting coach for the Elephants. In October 2006, Wang was named the team's field manager. He resigned as manager in May 2009. He then coached youth and college baseball teams from 2010. Wang was diagnosed with liver cancer in 2020 and died of the disease on 30 August 2021, at the age of 56.

His younger brother Wang Kuang-shih, played for the China Times Eagles as an infielder, and Wang's son Wang Wei-chen is an infielder for the CTBC Brothers.

=== As player ===
Season	team	G	AB	H	HR	RBI	SB	BB	SO	TB	DP	AVG
1990	Brother Elephants	79	310	106	9	45	3	24	21	158	8	0.342
1991	Brother Elephants	64	243	66	9	35	2	25	26	108	5	0.272
1992	Brother Elephants	88	319	81	12	43	12	39	37	126	6	0.254
1993	Brother Elephants	84	290	95	10	46	8	30	26	143	7	0.328
1994	Brother Elephants	85	344	102	10	55	1	13	40	152	11	0.297
1995	Brother Elephants	83	297	94	8	48	1	26	37	134	12	0.316
1996	Brother Elephants	91	354	115	8	57	3	16	35	161	10	0.325
1997	Brother Elephants	96	365	95	4	49	1	30	42	127	12	0.260
1998	Brother Elephants	86	334	102	9	56	5	18	38	141	11	0.305
1999	Brother Elephants	89	325	70	8	41	4	33	38	107	15	0.215
2000	Brother Elephants	30	105	27	0	17	1	7	18	33	3	0.257
2001	Brother Elephants	76	239	54	4	28	1	23	27	45	10	0.213
2002	Brother Elephants	12	14	4	0	2	0	7	1	3	4	0.286
2003	Brother Elephants	1	1	0	0	0	0	0	0	0	0	0.000
2004	Brother Elephants	1	2	1	0	1	0	0	1	1	0	0.500
Total	15 years	968	3542	1009	91	524	42	285	390	1467	109	0.285

=== As manager ===
Season	Team	Game	Win	Loss	Tie	Win%
2007	Brother Elephants	100	49	50	1	0.495
2008	Brother Elephants	98	52	42	4	0.553
2009	Brother Elephants	26	7	19	0	0.269
Total	3 years	224	108	111	5	0.482

Awards
Preceded by First Champion	CPBL Batting Champion Award; 1990	Succeeded by Luis Iglesias

Sporting positions
Preceded by None	Brother Elephants Batting Coach; 2000–2006	Succeeded by Lee Chu-ming (李居明)
Preceded by Wu Shih-hsih	Brother Elephants Manager; 2007–2009	Succeeded by Sin Nakagomi
