= Bernie Tatís =

Dominican baseball player and manager

- Utility player / Manager
- Born: 21 May 1962 (age 64); Villa Vásquez, Dominican Republic
- Bats: Switch Throws: Right
- Stats at Baseball Reference

Teams
- Wei Chuan Dragons (1994, 1997–1999)

Career highlights and awards
- 3x Taiwan Series champion (1997, 1998, 1999); CPBL stolen bases champion (1997); CPBL stolen bases champion (1998)

Bernardo Antonio Tatís Alemán (born 21 May 1962) is a Dominican professional baseball manager and former utility player. Tatís played in the minor leagues for the Toronto Blue Jays, Pittsburgh Pirates and Texas Rangers organizations. He later spent eight seasons in the Mexican League and four in the Chinese Professional Baseball League (CPBL) before retiring at the end of the 1999 season. He won one Mexican League championship with the Diablos Rojos del México and three Taiwan Series with the Wei Chuan Dragons.

As a manager, Tatís spent ten seasons in the Mexican League, most notably winning back-to-back championships with the Diablos Rojos del México in 2002 and 2003.

== Playing career ==
=== Minor leagues ===
Tatís was born on 21 May 1962 in Villa Vásquez, Monte Cristi Province. In 1981, he was signed by the Toronto Blue Jays and made his professional debut with the Medicine Hat Blue Jays of the Pioneer League. The following year, he was promoted to the Florence Blue Jays of the Single-A South Atlantic League. In 1983 and 1984, he played for the Kinston Blue Jays of the High-A Carolina League. In 1985 he was promoted to Double-A level with the Knoxville Blue Jays of the Southern League, where he played through 1987.

After seven years in the Blue Jays' minor league system, Tatís signed with the Pittsburgh Pirates in 1988 and was assigned to the Triple-A Buffalo Bisons of the American Association. He spent the 1989 season with the Diablos Rojos del México in the Mexican League and the Harrisburg Senators in the Double-A Eastern League.

In 1990 he signed with the Texas Rangers and spent the next two seasons playing for the Oklahoma City 89ers of the American Association and the Canton-Akron Indians of the Eastern League.

=== Mexican League ===
In 1992, Tatís joined the Diablos Rojos del México and led the league in scored runs with 123. In 1993 he was traded to the Pericos de Puebla and returned to the Diablos Rojos in 1994.

On 31 July 1994, he became the seventh player in the history of the Mexican League to play all nine positions in a single game doing so against the Piratas de Campeche at the Parque Deportivo del Seguro Social. He started as a left fielder, moved to center field in the second inning, and played right field in the third. In the fourth inning, he played third base, then shortstop in the fifth, second base in the sixth, and first base in the seventh. He caught in the eighth inning and pitched the ninth, securing the save for Elmer Dessens' victory. The Diablos Rojos won the game 5–2.

That year, he won the Mexican League championship with the Diablos after defeating the Sultanes de Monterrey 4–3 in the final series. He also appeared in 14 games for the Wei Chuan Dragons in the Chinese Professional Baseball League (CPBL). In 1995, Tatís returned with the Diablos Rojos and in 1996 he transferred to the Leones de Yucatán.

=== Chinese Professional Baseball League ===
In 1997, Tatís signed with the Wei Chuan Dragons and finished the season as the CPBL stolen bases champion with 71, a record that stands till today. He played a key role in helping the Dragons win the 1997 Taiwan Series. The following season, he once again led the league in stolen bases with 65 and secured his second consecutive Taiwan Series championship.

In 1999, Tatís returned to the Mexican League to play for the Leones de Yucatán. Later that year, he rejoined the Wei Chuan Dragons for the final 22 games of the CPBL season, helping the team secure its third consecutive Taiwan Series championship. He retired from professional baseball at the end of the season.

== Managerial career ==
After his retirement, Tatís managed several teams in the Mexican League: Diablos Rojos del México, Acereros de Monclova, Sultanes de Monterrey, Leones de Yucatán, Rojos del Águila de Veracruz, Rieleros de Aguascalientes and Olmecas de Tabasco. He led the Diablos Rojos to back-to-back championships in 2002 and 2003. His last managerial role was with the Rojos del Águila de Veracruz in 2010.
