= Wu Shih-hsih =

Taiwanese baseball player

- Third baseman
- Born: 2 July 1963 (age 63); Taichung, Taiwan
- Batted: Right Threw: Right

CPBL debut
- March 12, 1993, for the Jungo Bears

Last appearance
- October 16, 1999, for the Brother Elephants

CPBL statistics
- Batting average: .255
- Home runs: 15
- Runs batted in: 174
- Stats at Baseball Reference

Teams
- Jungo Bears (1993–1994); Uni-President Lions (1995–1997); Brother Elephants (1998–1999)

Career highlights and awards
- CPBL All-Star (1993, 1998–1999); CPBL Gold Glove (1993)
Medals
Representing Chinese Taipei
Men's baseball
Olympic Games
Silver medal – second place	1992 Barcelona	Team

Wu Shih-hsih (Chinese: 吳思賢; pinyin: Wú Sīxián; born 2 July 1963) is a Taiwanese baseball player who competed in the 1992 Summer Olympics.

He was part of the Chinese Taipei baseball team which won the silver medal. He played as infielder.

In the 1988 Summer Olympics he participated also with the team of Chinese Taipei when baseball was a demonstration sport.

Sporting positions
Preceded by Lin Yi-tseng (林易增)	Brother Elephants Manager; 2006	Succeeded by Wang Kuang-hui (王光輝)
