= Shin Nakagomi =

Japanese baseball player (born 1970)

Sin Nakagomi
- Pitcher/Manager
- Born: February 16, 1970 (age 55); Kai, Yamanashi, Japan
- Batted: Right Threw: Right

Professional debut
- NPB: May 13, 1990, for the Hanshin Tigers
- CPBL: March 9, 2002, for the Brother Elephants

Last appearance
- NPB: August 24, 2001, for the Hanshin Tigers
- CPBL: October 8, 2005, for the Brother Elephants

NPB statistics
- Win–loss record: 41–62
- Strikeouts: 562
- Earned run average: 3.74

CPBL statistics
- Win–loss record: 45–29
- Strikeouts: 412
- Earned run average: 3.16

Teams
- As player: Hanshin Tigers (1990–1993, 1996–2001); Brother Elephants (2002–2005); As coach: Brother Elephants (2008–2009); As manager: Brother Elephants (2009)

Shin Nakagomi (中込 伸, Nakagomi Shin; born February 16, 1970) is a retired Japanese professional baseball player and the former manager of Brother Elephants. In 2010, he was convicted of 5 charges of match fixing as a part of the 2009 game-fixing scandal and sentenced to 20 months in prison.

== Baseball career ==
=== NPB ===
Season	Team	G	W	L	SV	CG	SHO	BB	SO	ER	INN	ERA
1990	Hanshin Tigers	4	0	2	0	0	0	5	5	11	11.1	8.74
1991	Hanshin Tigers	13	1	4	0	2	0	29	47	34	71.1	4.29
1992	Hanshin Tigers	28	9	8	0	7	1	77	111	54	200.2	2.42
1993	Hanshin Tigers	28	8	13	0	4	0	62	153	82	199.0	3.71
1996	Hanshin Tigers	8	0	4	0	0	0	9	25	23	31.1	6.61
1997	Hanshin Tigers	23	7	7	0	1	0	38	60	38	110.2	3.09
1998	Hanshin Tigers	26	8	13	0	1	0	40	69	76	143.0	4.78
1999	Hanshin Tigers	15	2	7	0	0	0	21	41	30	82.2	3.27
2000	Hanshin Tigers	25	3	3	2	0	0	10	37	25	48.2	4.62
2001	Hanshin Tigers	12	3	1	0	0	0	9	14	8	17.2	4.08
Total	10 years	182	41	62	2	15	1	300	562	381	916.1	3.74

=== CPBL ===
==== As player ====
Season	Team	G	W	L	HLD	SV	CG	SHO	BB	SO	ER	INN	ERA
2002	Brother Elephants	28	15	9	0	0	8	2	43	123	69	190.2	3.26
2003	Brother Elephants	27	13	8	0	3	4	1	27	129	46	163.1	2.54
2004	Brother Elephants	26	14	6	0	0	7	0	41	108	54	113.0	2.77
2005	Brother Elephants	16	3	6	0	0	1	1	27	52	51	98.1	4.67
Total	4 years	97	45	29	0	3	20	4	138	412	220	627.2	3.15

==== As manager ====
Season	Team	Game	Win	Loss	Tie	Win%
2009	Brother Elephants	49	25	23	1	0.521
Total	1 year	49	25	23	1	0.521

Sporting positions
Preceded by Chen Hsien-chang (陳憲章)	Brother Elephants Pitching Coach; 2008–2009	Succeeded by Tsao Chun-Yang (曹竣揚)
Preceded by Wang Kuang-hui (王光輝)	Brother Elephants Manager; 2009	Succeeded by Chen Rui-zhen (陣瑞振)
