= Hsieh Chang-heng =

Taiwanese baseball player

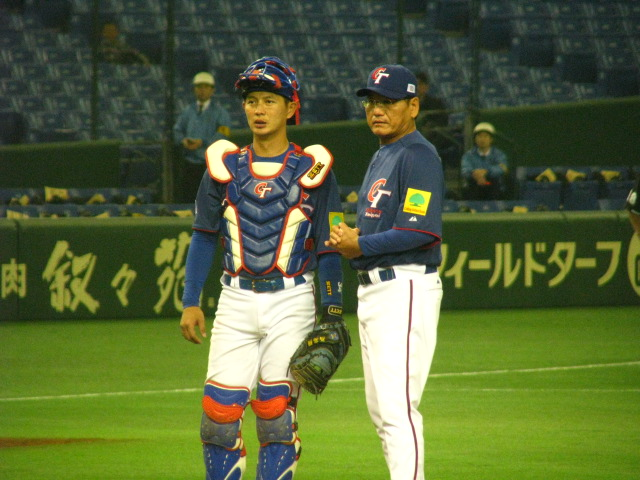
- Hsieh Chang-heng and Gao Zhigang.
- Pitcher / Manager
- Bats: Right Throws: Right

CPBL debut
- March 30, 1991, for the Uni-President Lions

Career statistics (through 2001)
- Record: 100-81
- Saves: 1
- Holds: 0
- ERA: 3.02
- Strikeouts: 855
- Stats at Baseball Reference

Teams
- As player: Uni-President Lions (1991–2001); As coach: Uni-President Lions pitcher coach (2002); Chinatrust Whales pitcher coach (2005–2007); As manager: Uni-President Lions manager (2003–2005); Chinatrust Whales manager (2007–2008); Brother Elephants manager (2013–2015)

Career highlights and awards
- Golden Glove Pitcher - CPBL (2000); 4x Taiwan Series champion (player) (1991, 1995, 1996, 2000)

Hsieh Chang-heng (Chinese: 謝長亨; pinyin: Yáng Jiànfú; Wade–Giles: Hsieh^{4} Chang^{2} Heng^{1}; born 22 January 1962) is a pitcher in the CPBL. He played for Uni-President Lions. He is the 1st person achieved the record of career with 100 wins. After retired, he became the manager of the Lions and then Chinatrust Whales until it went defunct in 2008.
