= Wang Jin-yong =

Taiwanese baseball player

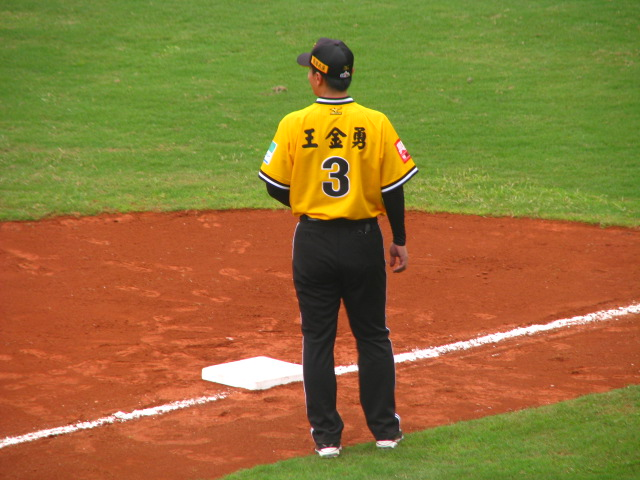
- Wang Jin-yong (2013)

Chinatrust Brothers
- First baseman / Coach
- Born: November 27, 1975 (age 50); Donghe, Taitung, Taitung County, Taiwan
- Bats: Right Throws: Right

CPBL debut
- July 8, 2000, for the Brother Elephants

Career statistics (through 2010)
- Batting average: .270
- Home runs: 35
- Runs batted in: 297
- Stats at Baseball Reference

Teams
- As player: Brother Elephants (2000–2010); As Coach: Brother Elephants / Chinatrust Brothers (2010–present)

Wang Jin-yong (Chinese: 王金勇; born 27 November 1975 in Taiwan) is a retired Taiwanese professional baseball player who played for Brother Elephants of the Chinese Professional Baseball League (CPBL) his entire career.

== Career statistics ==
Season	G	AB	H	HR	RBI	SB	BB	SO	TB	DP	AVG
2000	38	139	41	2	24	2	9	18	56	7	.295
2001	86	319	92	5	50	6	29	44	128	6	.288
2002	66	214	62	4	25	6	21	26	88	4	.290
2003	51	131	34	3	24	0	12	18	50	2	.260
2004	66	218	57	5	31	4	21	37	81	5	.261
2005	61	219	58	3	28	1	16	54	87	0	.265
2006	89	298	73	5	31	1	22	43	98	9	.245
2007	80	210	55	3	24	1	21	22	74	6	.262
2008	43	121	33	2	11	1	15	58	43	1	.273
2009	99	316	88	3	44	1	26	39	114	13	.278
2010	24	37	8	0	5	0	2	9	8	0	.216
Total	703	2222	601	35	297	23	194	368	827	53	.270
