= Mai Chia-je =

Taiwanese baseball player (1987–2020)

Brother Elephants – No. 25
- Pitcher
- Born: 25 February 1987; Taiwan
- Died: 30 September 2020 (aged 33); Tainan, Taiwan
- Batted: Right Threw: Right

CPBL debut
- March 21, 2008, for the Brother Elephants

Career statistics (through 2008)
- Record: 4-6
- Holds: 1
- Saves: 8
- ERA: 4.31
- Strikeouts: 54
- Stats at Baseball Reference

Teams
- Brother Elephants (2008–2009)

Mai Chia-je (Chinese: 買嘉瑞; pinyin: Mǎi Jiāruì; 25 February 1987 – 30 September 2020) was a Taiwanese baseball player who played for Brother Elephants of the Chinese Professional Baseball League.

He was a pitcher and became the team's closer in the middle of the 2008 season. His career ended in 2009, following an investigation into match fixing. He died in a traffic collision on 30 September 2020. Mai's older brother Mai Chia-yi was also a baseball player.

== Career statistics ==
Season	Team	G	W	L	HD	SV	CG	SHO	BB	SO	ER	INN	ERA
2008	Brother Elephants	46	4	6	1	8	0	0	34	54	43	87.1	4.431
Total	1year	46	4	6	1	8	0	0	34	54	43	87.1	4.431
