= Wang Wei-chen =

Taiwanese baseball player (born 1991)

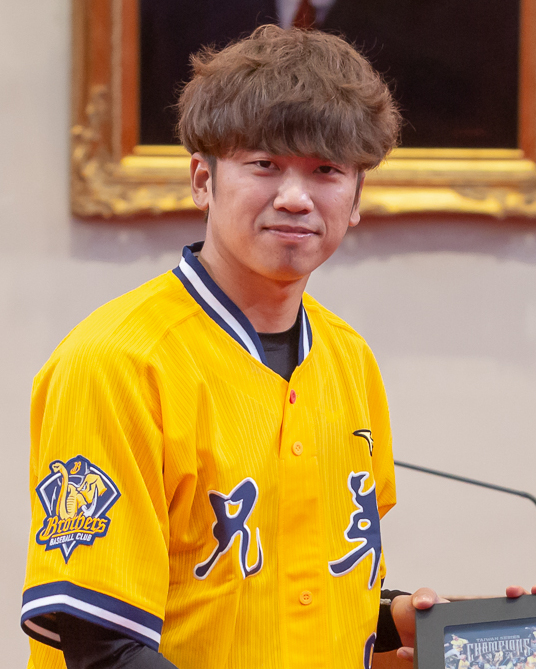
- Wang in 2023

CTBC Brothers – No. 9
- Infielder
- Born: July 3, 1991 (age 34); Taipei, Taiwan
- Bats: Left Throws: Right

CPBL debut
- April 26, 2016, for the Chinatrust Brothers

CPBL statistics (through 2025)
- Batting average: .312
- Hits: 1,093
- Home runs: 12
- Runs batted in: 341

Teams
- Chinatrust Brothers / CTBC Brothers (2016–present)

Career highlights and awards
- 3x Taiwan Series champion (2021, 2022, 2024)

Wang Wei-chen (Chinese: 王威晨; pinyin: Wáng Wēi Chén; born July 3, 1991) is a Taiwanese professional baseball infielder and the captain for the CTBC Brothers of the Chinese Professional Baseball League (CPBL). Wang represented Taiwan at the 2019 WBSC Premier12 and the 2023 World Baseball Classic.

== Career ==
=== Chinatrust/CTBC Brothers ===
Wang was selected by the CTBC Brothers as their 13th pick in the 2015 Chinese Professional Baseball League draft and made his professional debut on 26 April 2016, entering as a substitute in a game against the Lamigo Monkeys at the Chiayi City Municipal Baseball Stadium, replacing Wang Sheng-wei. Wang went 0-for-2 with one strikeout.

He hit his first home run on 4 September 2019 against the Lamigo Monkeys at the Taoyuan International Baseball Stadium.

== International career ==
Wang represented Chinese Taipei at the 2019 WBSC Premier12, where the team finished fifth with a 4–3 record. He appeared in all seven games, recording four runs, seven hits, one double, three RBIs and a .280 batting average in 25 at bats.

In 2023, Wang was selected to represent Chinese Taipei at the 2023 World Baseball Classic. He appeared in two games, against Panama and Cuba. He recorded one run and one hit in three at-bats, posting a .333 batting average during the tournament.
