= 2008 CPBL season =

The 2008 Chinese Professional Baseball League season began on March 16 when the defending champion Uni-President Lions played against the La New Bears in Tainan. The season concluded in October.

== Regular season ==
=== Standings ===
First half

Pos	Team	Pld	W	L	T	PCT
1	Uni-President Lions	50	34	16	0	.680
2	La New Bears	49	27	19	3	.582
3	Brother Elephants	49	24	22	3	.520
4	dMedia T-Rex	50	21	28	1	.430
5	Chinatrust Whales	50	20	30	0	.400
6	Sinon Bulls	50	19	30	1	.390

Second half

Pos	Team	Pld	W	L	T	PCT
1	La New Bears	50	33	16	1	.670
2	Uni-President Lions	50	33	17	0	.660
3	Brother Elephants	48	28	19	1	.594
4	Chinatrust Whales	50	19	31	0	.380
5	Sinon Bulls	50	18	32	0	.360
6	dMedia T-Rex	48	16	32	0	.333
