= Lin Ming-hsien =

Taiwanese baseball player

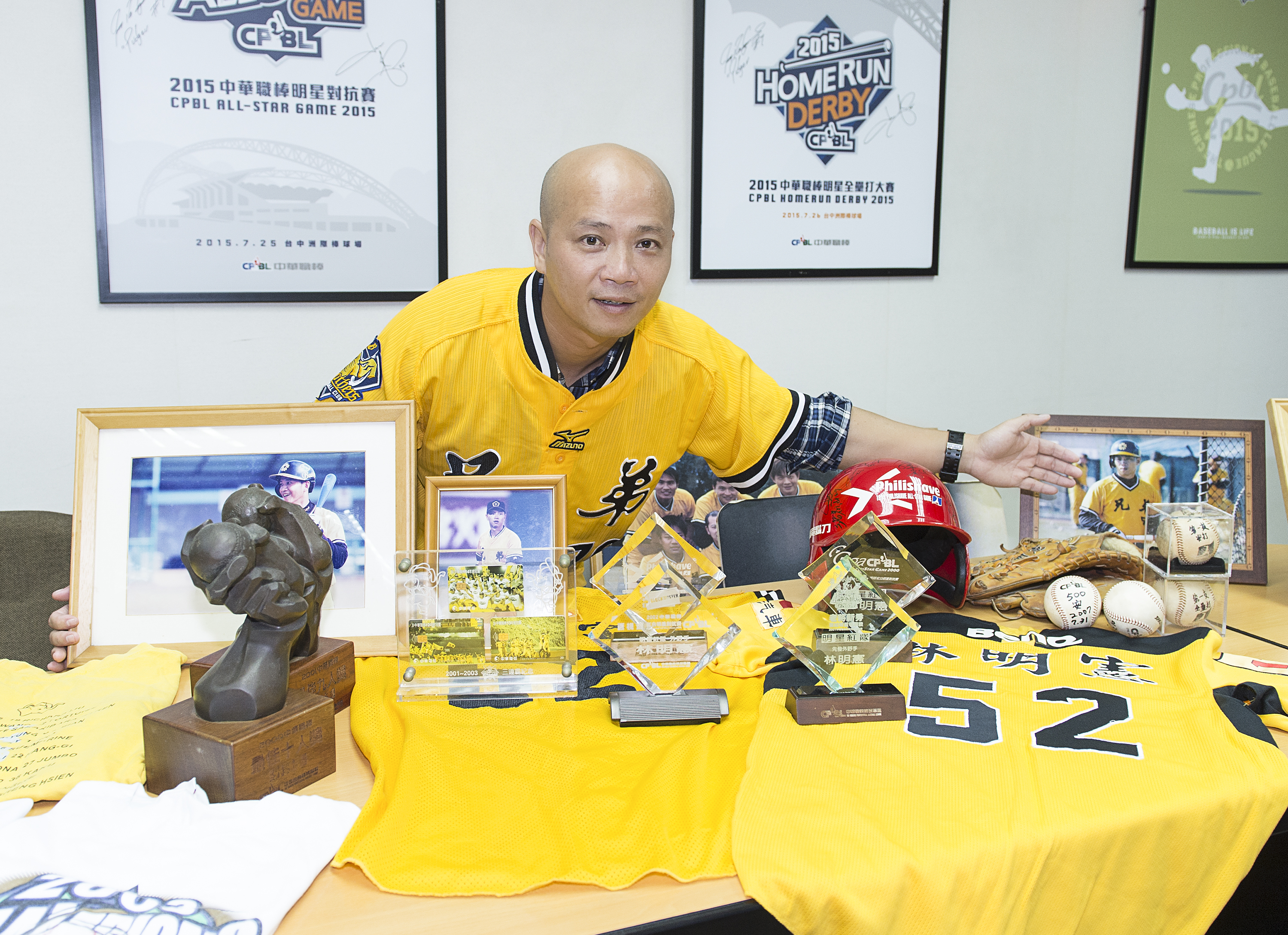

CTBC Brothers – No. 76
- Left fielder
- Born: 29 March 1977 (age 49); Taiwan
- Bats: Left Throws: Left

CPBL debut
- April 17, 1999, for the Brother Elephants

Career statistics (through 2008)
- Batting average: .281
- Home runs: 13
- Runs batted in: 200
- Stolen Base: 98
- Runs: 326
- Stats at Baseball Reference

Teams
- As plarer: Brother Elephants (1999–present); As coach: Brother Elephants/CTBC Brothers Physical Coach (2009 –present)

Lin Ming-hsien (Chinese: 林明憲; pinyin: Lín Míngxiàn; born 29 March 1977 in Taiwan) is a Taiwanese baseball player who played for the Brother Elephants of the Chinese Professional Baseball League. He played as left fielder.

== Career ==
On May 10, 2023, Lin shifted from manager of the farm team to first team coordinator.

== Career statistics ==
Season	Team	G	AB	H	HR	RBI	SB	BB	SO	TB	DP	AVG
1999	Brother Elephants	69	216	61	3	18	19	29	31	83	1	0.282
2000	Brother Elephants	79	277	78	1	33	19	40	23	98	3	0.282
2001	Brother Elephants	79	285	87	3	32	13	27	29	127	5	0.305
2002	Brother Elephants	77	291	76	1	26	10	31	36	109	5	0.261
2003	Brother Elephants	73	278	76	2	30	7	28	28	100	5	0.273
2004	Brother Elephants	88	332	83	2	28	17	37	41	107	6	0.250
2005	Brother Elephants	4	4	1	0	0	0	2	0	1	0	0.250
2006	Brother Elephants	11	23	8	0	2	0	0	5	9	0	0.348
2007	Brother Elephants	59	205	66	1	15	5	23	31	79	1	0.322
2008	Brother Elephants	62	148	30	0	16	8	20	12	32	4	0.203
Total	10 years	601	2059	566	13	200	98	237	236	745	30	0.275

== See also ==
- Chinese Professional Baseball League
- Brother Elephants
