= Chen Je-chang =

Taiwanese baseball player

Brother Elephants – No. 15
- Catcher
- Born: 30 December 1973 (age 52); Taiwan
- Bats: Right Throws: Right

CPBL debut
- February 21, 1996, for the Brother Elephants

Career statistics (through 2008)
- Batting average: .264
- Home runs: 32
- Runs batted in: 283
- Stats at Baseball Reference

Teams
- As player: Brother Elephants (1996–2009); As coach: Brother Elephants Bullpen Coach (2009–present)

Chen Je-chang (Chinese: 陳瑞昌; pinyin: Chén Ruìchāng; born 30 December 1973 in Taiwan) is a former Taiwanese professional baseball catcher who played for the Brother Elephants of Chinese Professional Baseball League. He currently plays as a catcher and a bullpen coach for the Elephants. He is the oldest current player of Brother Elephants. His younger brother, Chen Je-cheng (陳瑞振), plays as third baseman in the same team. Chen holds the CPBL highest record for being hit by a pitch 100 times during his baseball career.

== Career statistics ==
Season	Team	G	AB	H	HR	RBI	SB	BB	SO	RBI	DP	AVG
1996	Brother Elephants	69	206	47	4	15	1	21	37	69	5	0.228
1997	Brother Elephants	69	193	50	1	17	2	19	33	61	8	0.259
1998	Brother Elephants	82	275	72	4	24	5	18	43	106	6	0.262
1999	Brother Elephants	78	275	71	5	37	2	28	55	106	8	0.258
2000	Brother Elephants	67	205	58	3	26	1	25	21	77	7	0.283
2001	Brother Elephants	45	99	25	1	9	1	4	18	31	4	0.253
2002	Brother Elephants	70	194	69	4	27	5	20	25	86	3	0.356
2003	Brother Elephants	85	252	61	0	26	1	29	42	77	6	0.242
2004	Brother Elephants	83	247	53	4	29	0	29	34	75	4	0.215
2005	Brother Elephants	66	193	56	1	26	1	23	32	75	1	0.290
2006	Brother Elephants	75	202	49	1	19	2	16	29	62	8	0.243
2007	Brother Elephants	55	96	29	1	7	0	8	12	34	2	0.302
2008	Brother Elephants	57	140	41	3	21	2	15	17	57	2	0.293
Total	13 years	901	2577	681	32	283	23	255	398	916	64	0.264

== See also ==
- Chinese Professional Baseball League
- Brother Elephants
