= Cheng Chi-hung =

Taiwanese baseball player

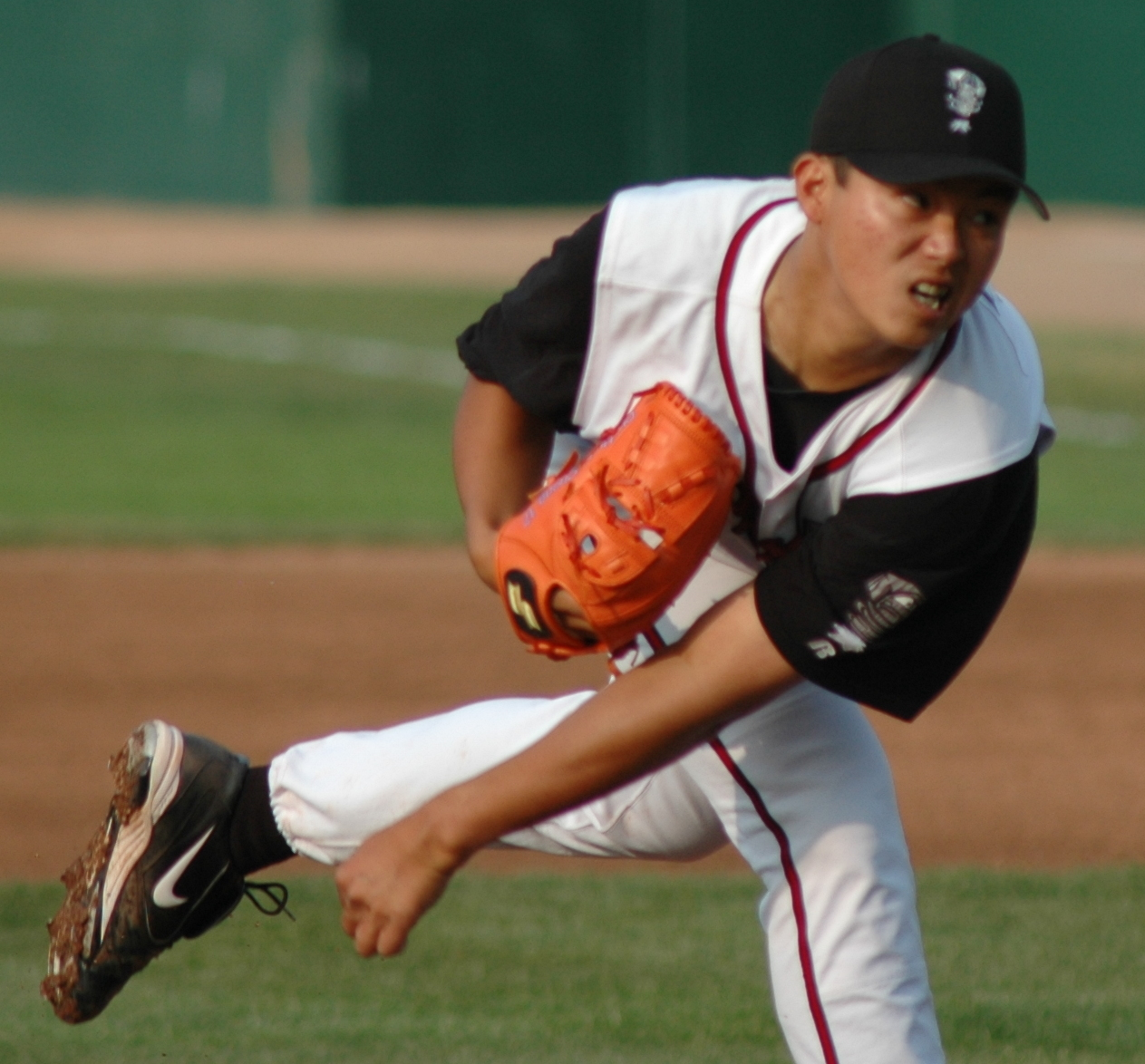
- Cheng with the Lansing Lugnuts in 2005

CTBC Brothers – No. 95
- Pitcher / Coach
- Born: 20 June 1985 (age 40); Kaohsiung City, Taiwan
- Bats: Left Throws: Left

CPBL debut
- 20 March, 2011, for the Brother Elephants
- Stats at Baseball Reference

Teams
- Brother Elephants CTBC Brothers (2011–2019)

Cheng Chi-hung (Chinese: 鄭錡鴻; pinyin: Zhèng Zhìxióng; born 20 June 1985 in Kaohsiung City, Taiwan), is a Taiwanese professional baseball pitcher for Chinatrust Brothers of Chinese Professional Baseball League (CPBL).

== Career ==
Cheng began his career in 2004 with the Pulaski Blue Jays, the Class-A affiliate of the Toronto Blue Jays.

In 2008, he played for the Lansing Lugnuts.

On January 4, 2009 Cheng signed a Minor League Contract with the Pittsburgh Pirates. On August 10, 2009 Cheng was released by the Pirates.

== International career ==
Cheng also plays for the Chinese Taipei national baseball team at the 2009 World Baseball Classic.
