= Keiichi Hirano =

Japanese baseball player (born 1979)

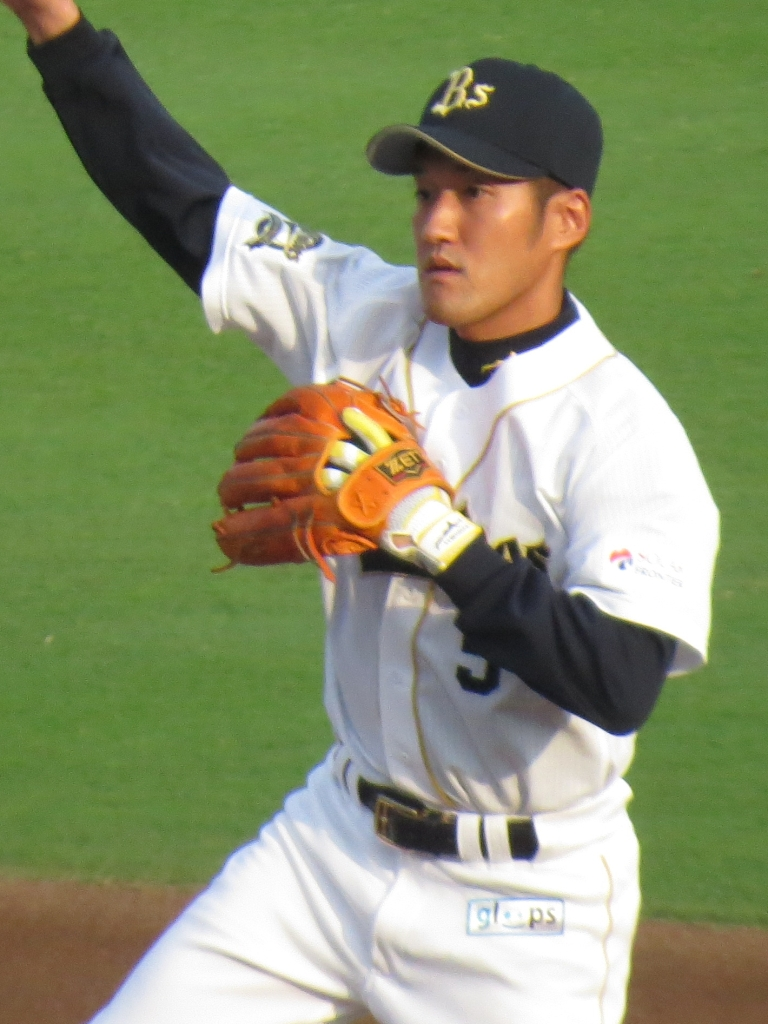
- Hirano with the Orix Buffaloes

CTBC Brothers – No. 10
- Second baseman / Outfielder / Manager
- Born: April 7, 1979 (age 46); Tama-ku, Kawasaki, Japan
- Batted: Left Threw: Right

NPB debut
- July 19, 2002, for the Orix BlueWave

Last NPB appearance
- May 20, 2015, for the Orix Buffaloes

NPB statistics
- Batting average: .279
- Home runs: 18
- Runs batted in: 263

Teams
- As player: Orix BlueWave / Orix Buffaloes (2002–2007); Hanshin Tigers (2008–2012); Orix Buffaloes (2013–2015); As manager: CTBC Brothers (2024–present); As coach: Hanshin Tigers (2016–2021); CTBC Brothers (2022–2023)

Career highlights and awards
- 4× NPB All-Star (2005, 2010–2012); 2× Best Nine Award (2010–2011); 2× Mitsui Golden Glove Award (2010–2011); Comeback Player of the Year (2008)

Keiichi Hirano (平野 恵一, born April 7, 1979) is a Japanese former professional baseball infielder and current manager for the CTBC Brothers of the Chinese Professional Baseball League (CPBL). He played in Nippon Professional Baseball (NPB) for the Orix Buffaloes and Hanshin Tigers from 2002 to 2015.

== Playing career ==
Hirano played 14 seasons in Nippon Professional Baseball (NPB) for the Orix Buffaloes (2002-2007, 2013-2015) and the Hanshin Tigers (2008-2012). In his career, Hirano batted .279/.337/.341 with 18 home runs and 263 RBI in 1,260 total games. He was also a 4-time NPB All-Star (2005, 2010-2012), 2-time Mitsui Golden Glove Award winner (2010-2011), 2-time Best Nine Award winner (2010-2011) and 1-time Comeback Player of the Year (2008).

== Coaching career ==
=== Hanshin Tigers ===
Hirano served as a coach for his former club, the Hanshin Tigers, from 2016 to 2021.

=== CTBC Brothers ===
On January 10, 2022, Hirano was hired by the CTBC Brothers of the Chinese Professional Baseball League (CPBL) to serve as the team's hitting coach and infield coordinator. On May 10, 2023, Hirano shifted to the position of farm director for position players.

On December 29, 2023, Hirano was named manager of the Brothers after Peng Cheng-min stepped down due to health concerns.
