= Chen Je-cheng =

Taiwanese baseball player

- Third baseman / Coach
- Born: 23 September 1975 (age 50); Taiwan
- Bats: Right Throws: Right

CPBL debut
- February 28, 1998, for the Brother Elephants

Career statistics (through 2008)
- Batting average: .278
- Home runs: 10
- Runs batted in: 358
- Stats at Baseball Reference

Teams
- As player: Brother Elephants (1998–2009); As coach: Brother Elephants Defense Coach (2009); Brother Elephants Manager (2010-2014)

Chen Je-cheng (Chinese: 陳瑞振; born 23 September 1975) is a Taiwanese baseball player who also managed for Brother Elephants of the Chinese Professional Baseball League.

During his career, he played as shortstop and third baseman. His elder brother, Chen Je-chang (陳瑞昌), is the coach for the Elephants.

In his early professional year, he played as shortstop. Starting in 2006, he switched to play as third baseman. After the 2009 season, he became manager of Elephants.

== Career statistics ==
Season	Team	G	AB	H	HR	RBI	SB	BB	SO	RBI	DP	AVG
1998	Brother Elephants	101	343	89	2	37	8	33	44	111	5	.259
1999	Brother Elephants	69	260	74	0	17	19	25	27	91	2	.285
2000	Brother Elephants	85	333	91	0	27	13	46	34	111	8	.273
2001	Brother Elephants	81	319	95	1	40	14	38	39	117	7	.298
2002	Brother Elephants	86	305	67	1	29	4	40	37	83	7	.222
2003	Brother Elephants	94	346	95	1	36	7	59	39	115	13	.274
2004	Brother Elephants	90	319	97	2	44	7	31	50	116	12	.304
2005	Brother Elephants	94	336	86	2	34	3	38	42	102	8	.256
2006	Brother Elephants	78	281	87	0	27	0	22	34	101	8	.310
2007	Brother Elephants	77	283	91	1	39	0	24	27	107	15	.322
2008	Brother Elephants	76	262	70	0	28	3	26	32	78	12	.267
Total	11 years	932	3388	942	10	358	78	382	425	1132	97	.278

== See also ==
- Chinese Professional Baseball League
- Brother Elephants
