= Taiwan Series =

Championship series of the Chinese Professional Baseball League

The Taiwan Series (Chinese: 台灣大賽) is the final championship series of the Chinese Professional Baseball League (CPBL). It is usually played in late October or early November, after the regular season. It was formerly known as the CPBL Seasonal Championship Series (Chinese: 中華職棒年度總冠軍賽), and was renamed the Taiwan Series after the merger of the CPBL and the Taiwan Major League in 2003.

== Qualification ==
Teams play two 60-game half-seasons. The two half-season winners automatically become the number one and two seeds. The winner with the better full-season record gains an automatic berth into the best-of-seven Taiwan Series, which is played in a 2-2-3 format. The other half-season winner must play a best-of-five series against the team with the best full-season record that did not win either half-season. If the same team wins both halves, the next two teams with the best full-season records play in the first round. The winner of that round advances to the Taiwan Series. In this scenario, the Taiwan Series uses a 2-2-2 format because the team that won both halves starts with an automatic one-win advantage.

Before 2000, if a team managed to win both half-seasons, they were directly crowned champion, and the Taiwan Series was not held.

== Results ==
Season	Champions	Result	Runners-up
1990	Wei Chuan Dragons	4–2	Mercuries Tigers
1991	Uni-President Lions	4–3	Wei Chuan Dragons
1992	Brother Elephants	Brother Elephants won the title by virtue of winning both half-seasons.	
1993	Brother Elephants	4–2	Uni-President Lions
1994	Brother Elephants	Brother Elephants won the title by virtue of winning both half-seasons.	
1995	Uni-President Lions	Uni-President Lions won the title by virtue of winning both half-seasons.	
1996	Uni-President Lions	4–2	Wei Chuan Dragons
1997	Wei Chuan Dragons	4–2	China Times Eagles
1998	Wei Chuan Dragons	4–3	Sinon Bulls
1999	Wei Chuan Dragons	4–1	Koos Group Whales
2000	Uni-President Lions	4–3	Sinon Bulls
2001	Brother Elephants	4–3	Uni-President Lions
2002	Brother Elephants	4–0	Chinatrust Whales
2003	Brother Elephants	4–2	Sinon Bulls
2004	Sinon Bulls	4–3	Uni-President Lions
2005	Sinon Bulls	4–0	Macoto Cobras
2006	La New Bears	4–0	Uni-President Lions
2007	Uni-President Lions	4–3	La New Bears
2008	Uni-President 7-Eleven Lions	4–3	Brother Elephants
2009	Uni-President 7-Eleven Lions	4–3	Brother Elephants
2010	Brother Elephants	4–0	Sinon Bulls
2011	Uni-President 7-Eleven Lions	4–1	Lamigo Monkeys
2012	Lamigo Monkeys	4–1	Uni-President 7-Eleven Lions
2013	Uni-President 7-Eleven Lions	4–0	EDA Rhinos
2014	Lamigo Monkeys	4–1	CTBC Brothers
2015	Lamigo Monkeys	4–3	CTBC Brothers
2016	EDA Rhinos	4–2	CTBC Brothers
2017	Lamigo Monkeys	4–1	CTBC Brothers
2018	Lamigo Monkeys	4–2	Uni-President Lions
2019	Lamigo Monkeys	4–1	CTBC Brothers
2020	Uni-President 7-Eleven Lions	4–3	CTBC Brothers
2021	CTBC Brothers	4–0	Uni-President 7-Eleven Lions
2022	CTBC Brothers	4–0	Rakuten Monkeys
2023	Wei Chuan Dragons	4–3	Rakuten Monkeys
2024	CTBC Brothers	4–1	Uni-President 7-Eleven Lions
2025	Rakuten Monkeys	4–1	CTBC Brothers
2026	Wei Chuan Dragons	4–2	CTBC Brothers

== See also ==
- Asia Series
- CPBL awards
