= Stolen base =

In baseball, when a runner advances one or more bases before the ball has been batted

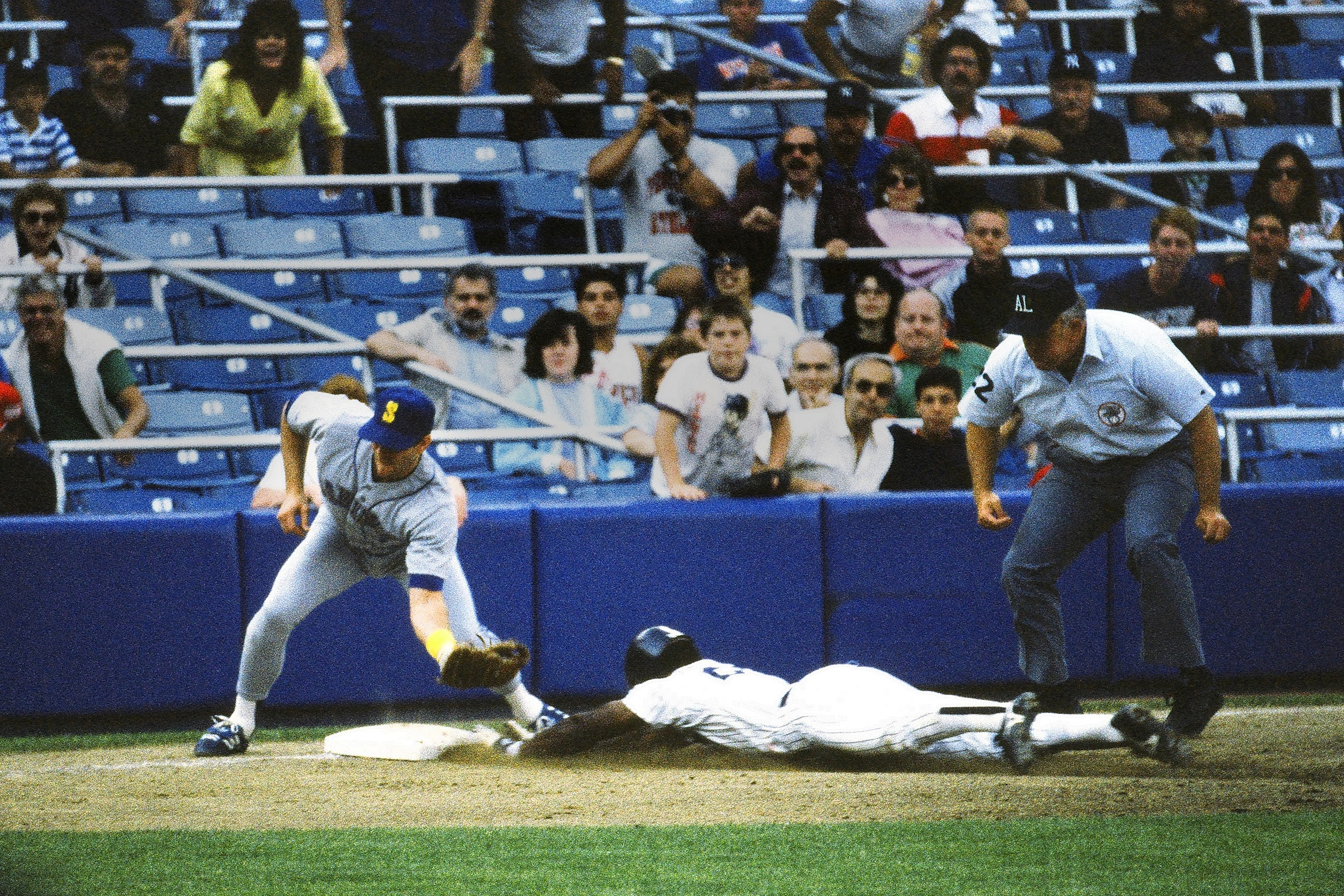
The all-time stolen base leader, Rickey Henderson, steals third base in 1988.

In baseball, a stolen base occurs when a runner advances to a base unaided by other actions and the official scorer rules that the advance should be credited to the action of the runner. The umpires determine whether the runner is safe or out at the next base, but the official scorer rules on the question of credit or blame for the advance under Rule 10 (Rules of Scoring) of the MLB's Official Rules.

A stolen base most often occurs when a base runner advances to the next base while the pitcher is pitching the ball to home plate.

== Background ==
Ned Cuthbert, playing for the Philadelphia Keystones in either 1863 or 1865, was the first player to steal a base in a baseball game, although the term stolen base was not used until 1870. For a time in the 19th century, stolen bases were credited when a baserunner reached an extra base on a base hit from another player. For example, if a runner on first base reached third base on a single, it counted as a steal. In 1887, Hugh Nicol set a still-standing Major League record with 138 stolen bases, many of which would not have counted under modern rules. Modern steal rules were fully implemented in 1898.

Graph depicting the yearly number of home runs (blue line) and stolen bases (pink line) per MLB game. The two primary periods in which the stolen base was popular were before 1920 and again in the 1970s and 1980s.

Base stealing was popular in the game's early decades, with speedsters such as Ty Cobb and Clyde Milan stealing nearly 100 bases in a season. But the tactic fell into relative disuse after Babe Ruth introduced the era of the home run – in 1955, for example, no one in baseball stole more than 25 bases, and Dom DiMaggio won the AL stolen base title in 1950 with just 15. However, in the late 1950s and early 1960s, base-stealing returned to prominence primarily thanks to Luis Aparicio and Maury Wills, who broke Cobb's modern single-season record by stealing 104 bases in 1962. In turn, Lou Brock broke Wills’ record in 1974, as did Rickey Henderson in 1982. The stolen base remained a popular tactic through the 1980s, perhaps best exemplified by Vince Coleman and the St. Louis Cardinals, but began to decline again in the 1990s as the frequency of home runs reached record heights and the steal-friendly artificial turf ballparks began to disappear.

Base stealing is an important characteristic of the "small ball" managing style (or "manufacturing runs"). Such managers emphasize "doing the little things" (including risky running plays like base-stealing) to advance runners and score runs, often relying on pitching and defense to keep games close. The Los Angeles Dodgers of the 1960s, led by pitcher Sandy Koufax and speedy shortstop Maury Wills, were a successful example of this style. The antithesis of this is reliance on power hitting, exemplified by the Baltimore Orioles of the 1970s, who aspired to score most of their runs via home runs. Often the "small ball" model is associated with the National League, while power hitting is associated with the American League. However, some successful recent American League teams, including the 2001 Seattle Mariners, 2002 Anaheim Angels, the 2005 Chicago White Sox, and the 2015 Kansas City Royals, have excelled at "small ball." The Royals in particular embodied this style within the 2010s, leading the league in stolen bases but finishing last in home runs in 2013 and 2014, leading to a berth in two consecutive World Series, the second of which they won in 2015. Successful teams often combine both styles, with speedy runners complementing power hitters—such as the 2005 champion White Sox, who hit 200 home runs, which was fifth most in the majors, and stole 137 bases, which was fourth.

== Base-stealing technique ==
Baseball's Rule 8 (The Pitcher) specifies the pitching procedure in detail. For example, in the Set Position, the pitcher must "com[e] to a complete stop"; thereafter, "any natural motion associated with his delivery of the ball to the batter commits him to the pitch without alteration or interruption." A runner intending to "steal on the pitcher" breaks for the next base the moment the pitcher commits to pitch to home plate. The pitcher cannot abort the pitch and try to put the runner out; this is a balk under Rule 8.

If the runner breaks too soon (before the pitcher is obliged to complete a pitch), the pitcher may throw to a base rather than pitch, and the runner may be tagged out between the bases. Past this moment, any delay in the runner's break makes it more likely that the catcher, after receiving the pitch, will be able to throw the runner out at the destination base.

Before the pitch, the runner takes a lead, walking several steps away from the base as a head start toward the next base. Even a runner who does not intend to steal takes a secondary lead of a few more steps, once the pitcher has legally committed to complete the pitch.

The pitcher may throw to the runner's base. The runner must return to that base or risk being tagged out. As well as putting the runner out, an underlying goal is to dissuade the runner from too big a lead; that is, to hold the runner on the original base. (Historically, this gambit could be used without limit. An MLB rules change in 2023 limited the pitcher to two throws without penalty; a third throw not resulting in an out will result in a balk.)

The more adept base stealers are proficient at reading the pickoff, meaning that they can detect certain tells (tell-tale signs) in a pitcher's pre-pitch movements or mannerisms that indicate the pickoff attempt is or is not imminent. For example, one experienced base stealer noted that careless pitchers dig the toes of their back foot into the ground when they are about to pitch in order to get a better push off, but when they intend to turn and throw a pickoff, they do not.

If a batted ball is caught on the fly, the runner must return to his original base. In this case, a runner trying to steal is more likely to be caught off his original base, resulting in a double play. This is a minor risk of a steal attempt. It is offset by the fact that a ground ball double play is less likely.

== Plays involving baserunning ==
In the hit-and-run play, coaches coordinate the actions of runner and batter. The runner tries to steal and the batter swings at almost any pitch, if only to "protect the runner" by distracting the catcher. If the batter makes contact, the runner has a greater chance of reaching the next base; if the batter gets a base hit, the runner will likely be able to take an extra base.

In the less-common run-and-hit play, the runner starts when the pitcher commits to pitch to home plate, but the batter uses judgment, declining to swing at bad pitches if the runner seems likely to succeed at stealing anyway. This play is used when coaches trust an experienced batter's discretion.

In the delayed steal, the runner does not take advantage of the pitcher's duty to complete a pitch, but relies on surprise and takes advantage of any complacency by the fielders. The runner gives the impression he is not trying to steal, and does not break for the next base until the ball crosses the plate. It is rare for Major League defenses to be fooled, but the play is used effectively at the college level. The first delayed steal on record was performed by Miller Huggins in 1903. The delayed steal was famously practiced by Eddie Stanky of the Brooklyn Dodgers.

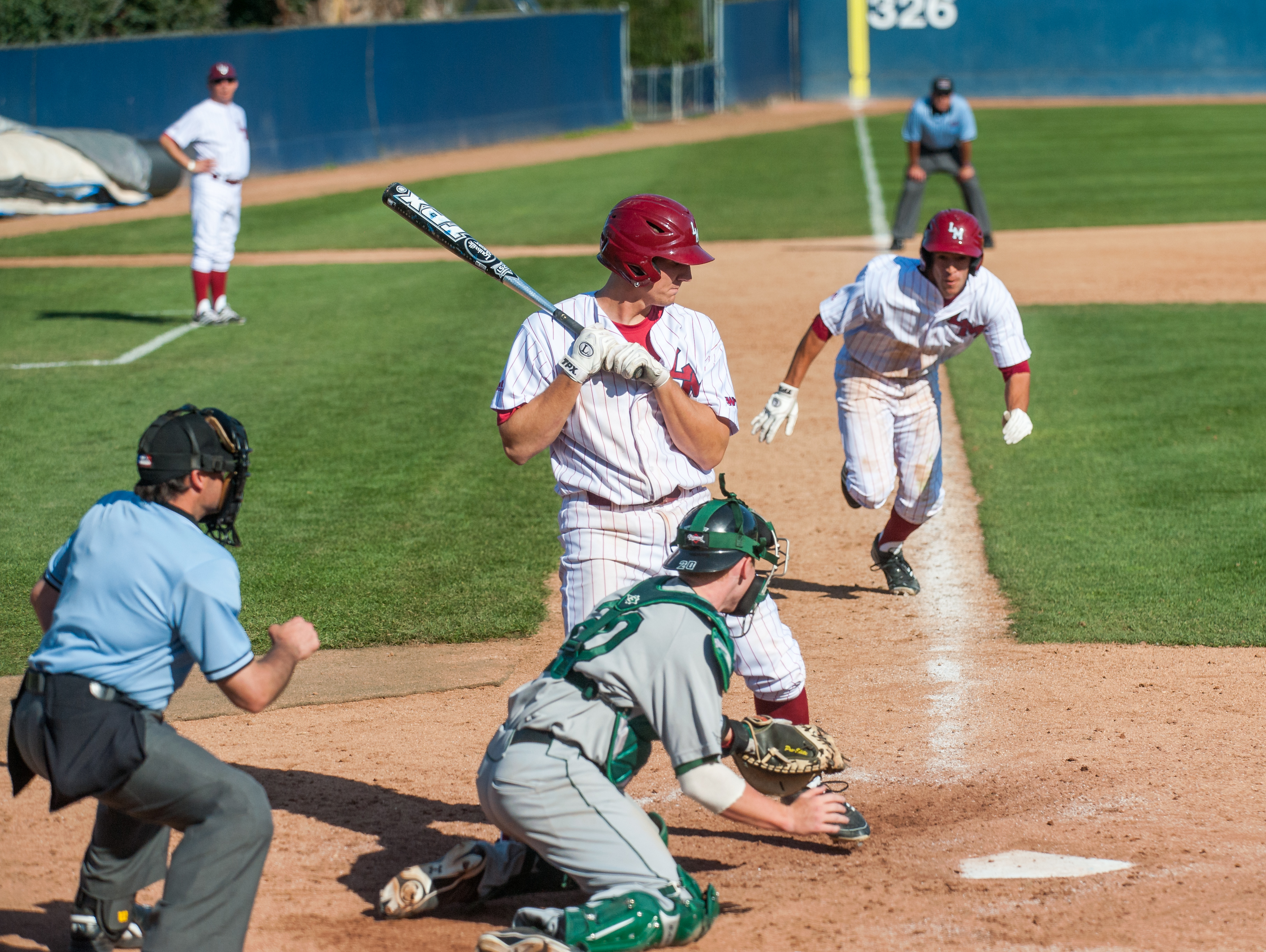
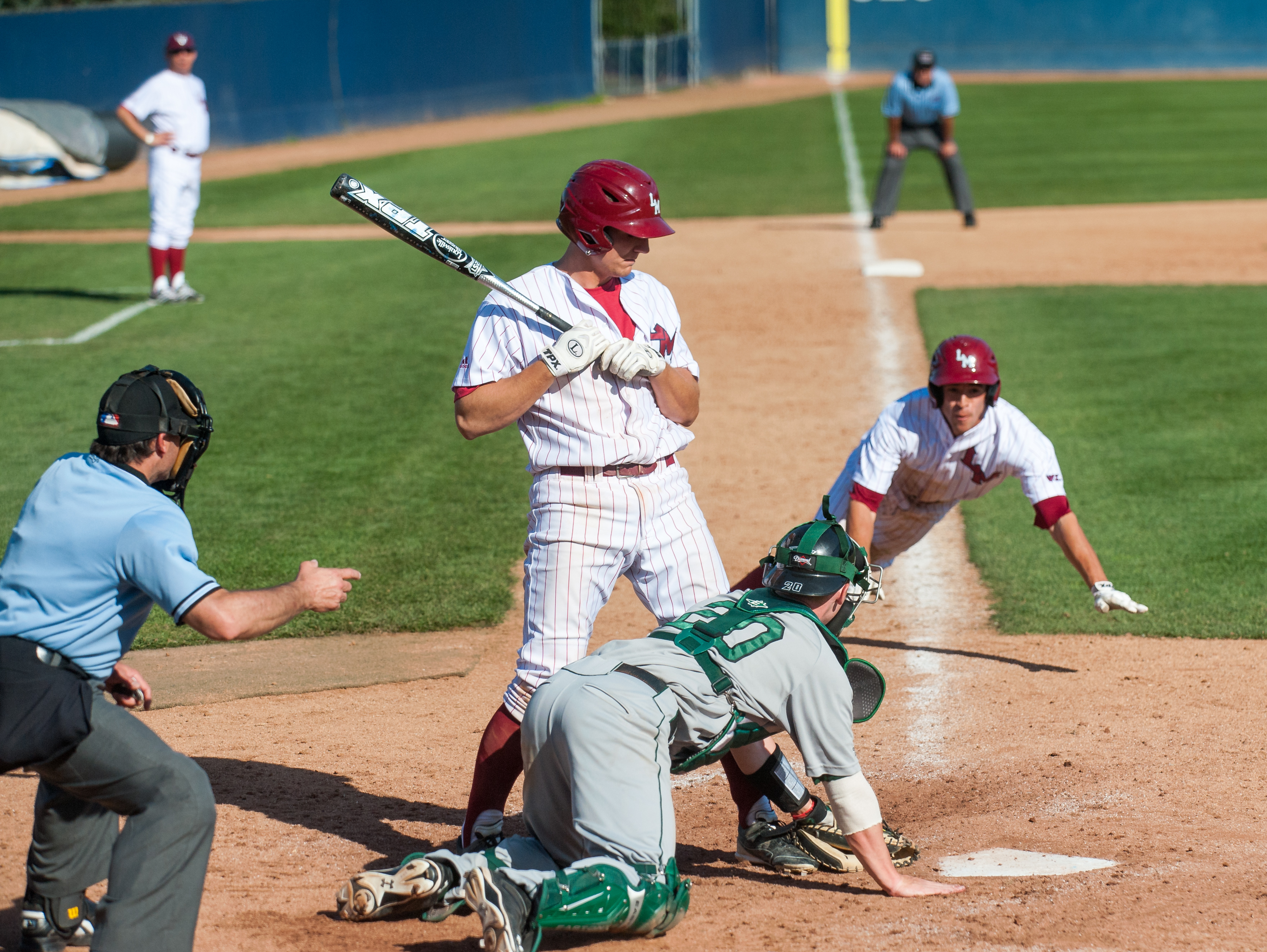
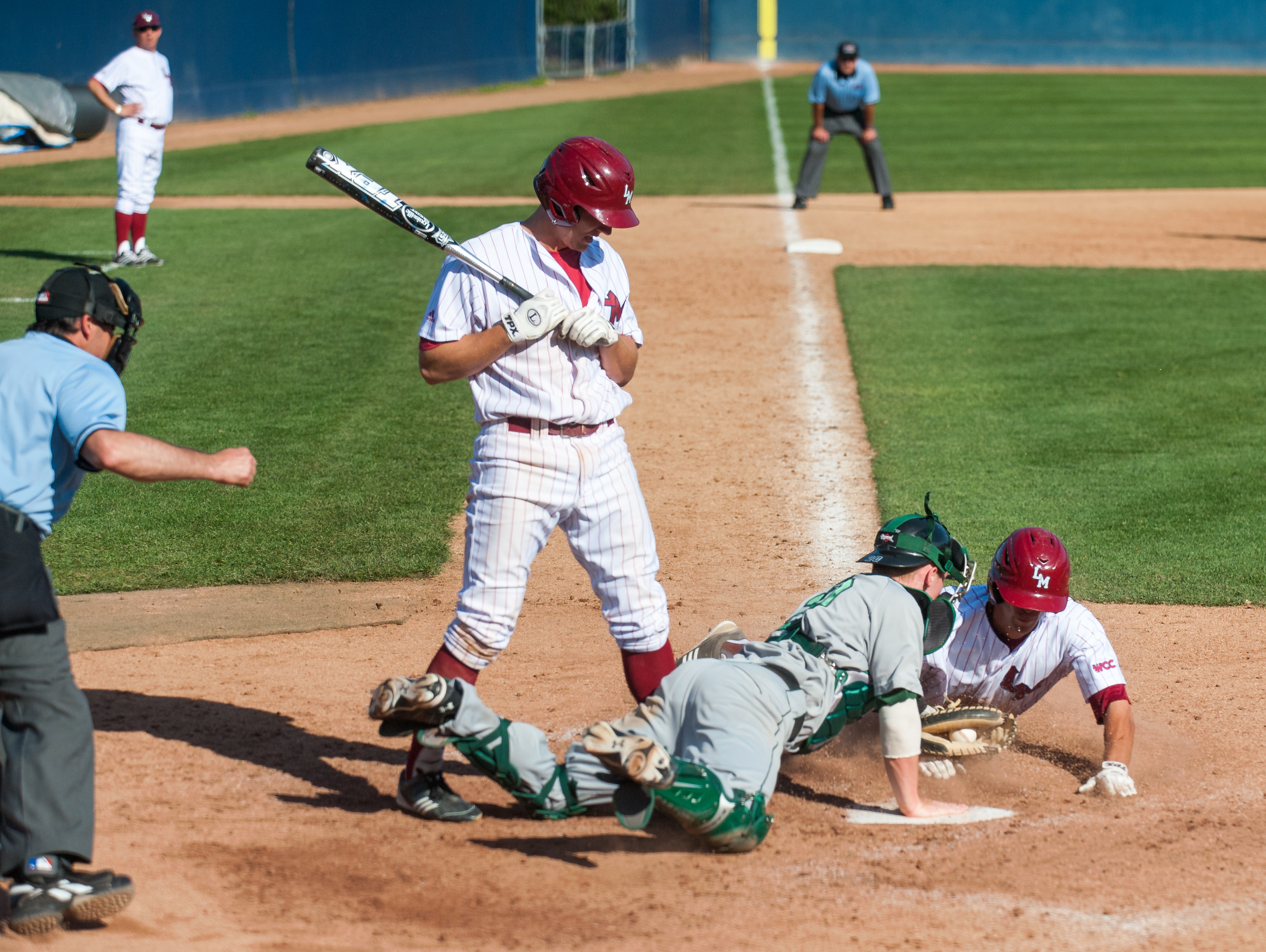
A Loyola Marymount baserunner attempts to steal home during a 2011 college baseball game in Los Angeles.

Second base is the base most often stolen, because once a runner is on second base he is considered to be in scoring position, meaning that he is expected to be able to run home and score on most routine singles hit into the outfield. Second base is also the easiest to steal, as it is farthest from home plate and thus a longer throw from the catcher is required to prevent it. Third base is a shorter throw for the catcher, but the runner is able to take a longer lead off second base and can leave for third base earlier against a left-handed pitcher. A steal of home plate is the riskiest, as the catcher only needs to tag out the runner after receiving the ball from the pitcher. It is difficult for the runner to cover the distance between the bases before the ball arrives home. Ty Cobb holds the records for most steals of home in a single season (8) as well as for a career (54). Steals of home are not officially recorded statistics, and must be researched through individual game accounts. Thus Cobb's totals may be even greater than is recorded. Jackie Robinson famously stole home in Game 1 of the 1955 World Series. Thirty-five games have ended with a runner stealing home, but only two have occurred since 1980. In a variation on the steal of home, the batter is signaled to simultaneously execute a sacrifice bunt, which results in the squeeze play. The suicide squeeze is a squeeze in which the runner on third begins to steal home without seeing the outcome of the bunt; it is so named because if the batter fails to bunt, the runner will likely be out, unless he successfully steals home. In contrast, when the runner on third does not commit until seeing that the ball is bunted advantageously, it is called a safety squeeze.

In more recent years, most steals of home involve a delayed double steal, in which a runner on first attempts to steal second, while the runner on third breaks for home as soon as the catcher throws to second base. If it is important to prevent the run from scoring, the catcher may hold on to the ball (conceding the steal of second) or may throw to the pitcher; this may deceive the runner at third and the pitcher may throw back to the catcher for the out.

== Statistics ==
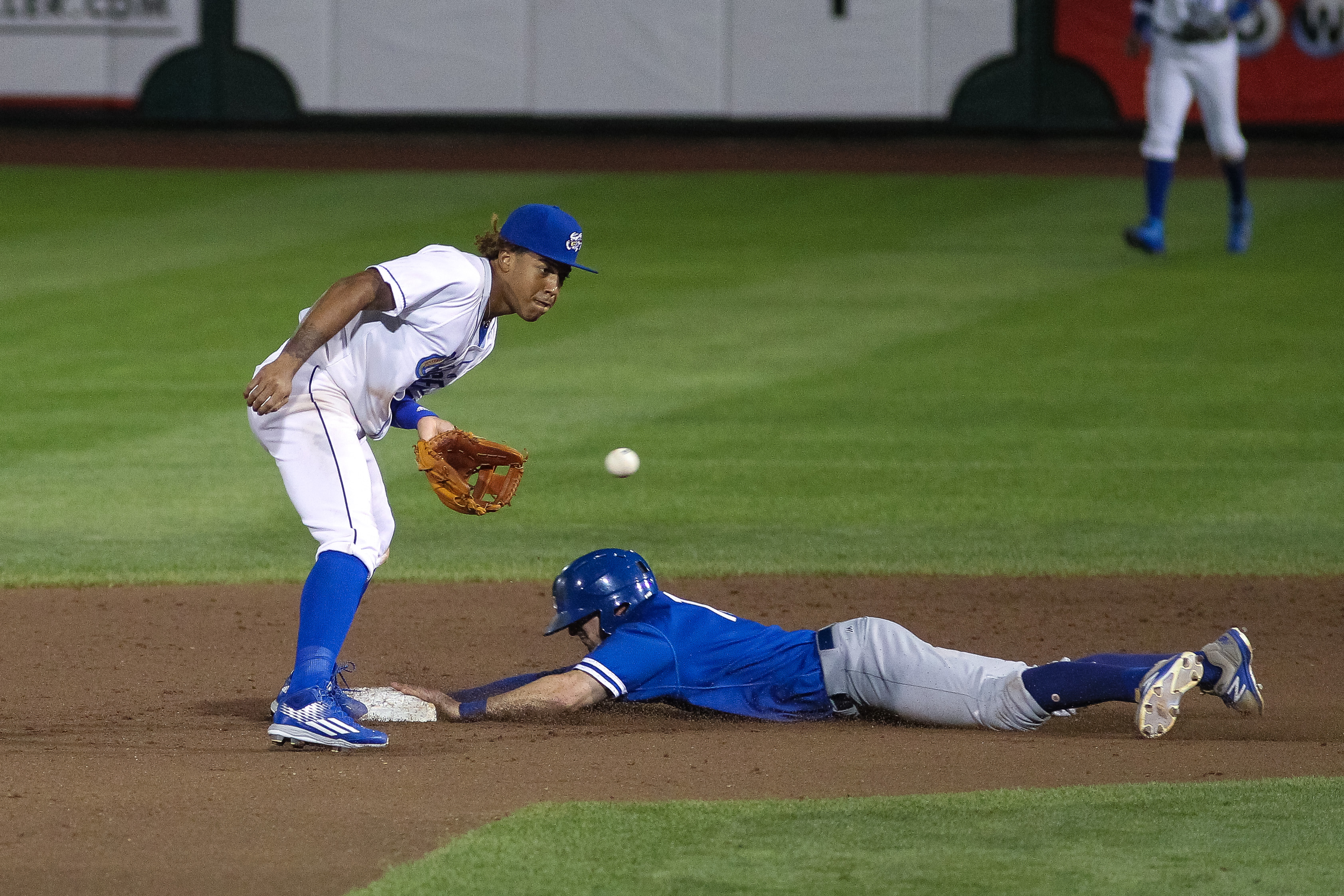
Tim Locastro steals second base for the Oklahoma City Dodgers during a 2017 game

In baseball statistics, stolen bases are denoted by "SB". Attempts to steal that result in the baserunner being out are caught stealing ("CS"). The sum of these statistics is steal attempts. Successful steals as a percentage of total steal attempts is called the success rate.

The rule on stolen bases states that:

- Advances that are credited to some other play are not steal attempts. For example, on a wild pitch or a passed ball, the official scorer must notice whether the runner broke for the next base before the pitch got away.
- As usual, statistics in the case of a defensive error are based on error-free play. If a runner would have been out, but for the error, it is scored as "caught stealing, safe on the error." A catcher does not commit an error by throwing poorly to the destination base, but if any runner takes an extra base on the bad throw, it is "stolen base plus error."
- There is no steal attempt on a dead ball, whether the runner is sent back to the original base (as on a foul ball) or is awarded the next base (as on a hit batsman). On a base award when the ball is live (such as a walk), the runner could make a steal attempt beyond the base awarded.
- Cases where the defense intentionally allows the runner to advance without attempting to put him out are scored as defensive indifference, also called fielder's indifference, and do not count as stolen bases. This is usually only scored late in games when it is clear that the defense's priority is getting the batter out. The lack of a putout attempt does not by itself indicate defensive indifference; the official scorer must also factor in the game situation and the defensive players' actions.

Relative skill at stealing bases can be judged by evaluating either a player's total number of steals or the success rate. Noted statistician Bill James has argued that unless a player has a high success rate (67–70% or better), attempting to steal a base is detrimental to a team.

Comparing skill against players from other eras is problematic, because the definition has not been constant. Caught stealing was not recorded regularly until the middle of the 20th century. Ty Cobb, for example, was known as a great base-stealer, with 892 steals and a success rate of over 83%. However, the data on Cobb's caught stealing is missing from 12 seasons, strongly suggesting he was unsuccessful many more times than his stats indicate. Carlos Beltrán, with 286 steals, has the highest career success rate of all players with over 300 stolen base attempts, at 88.3%.

== Evolution of rules and scoring ==
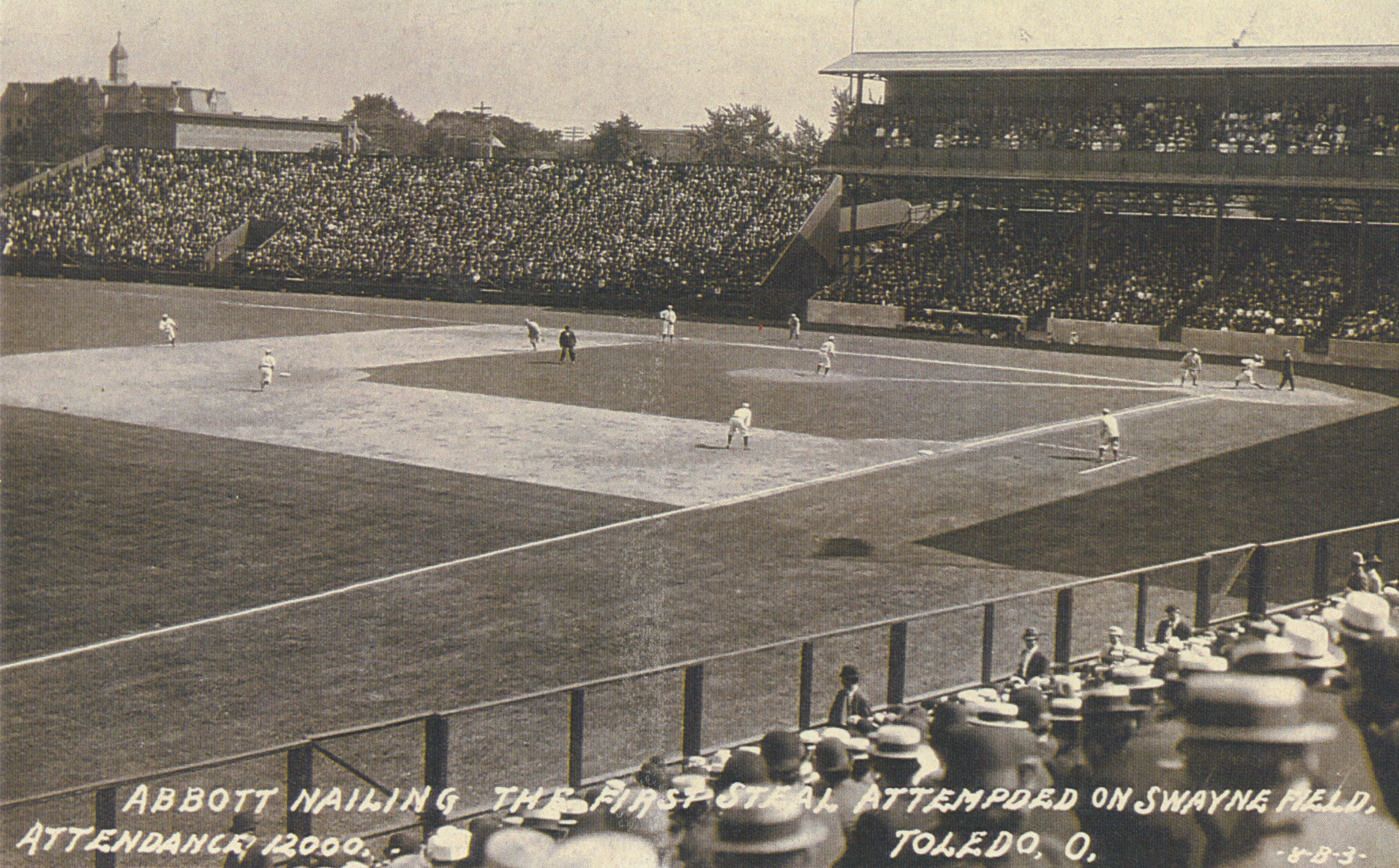
"Abbot Nailing the First Steal Attempded [sic] on Swayne Field" 1909

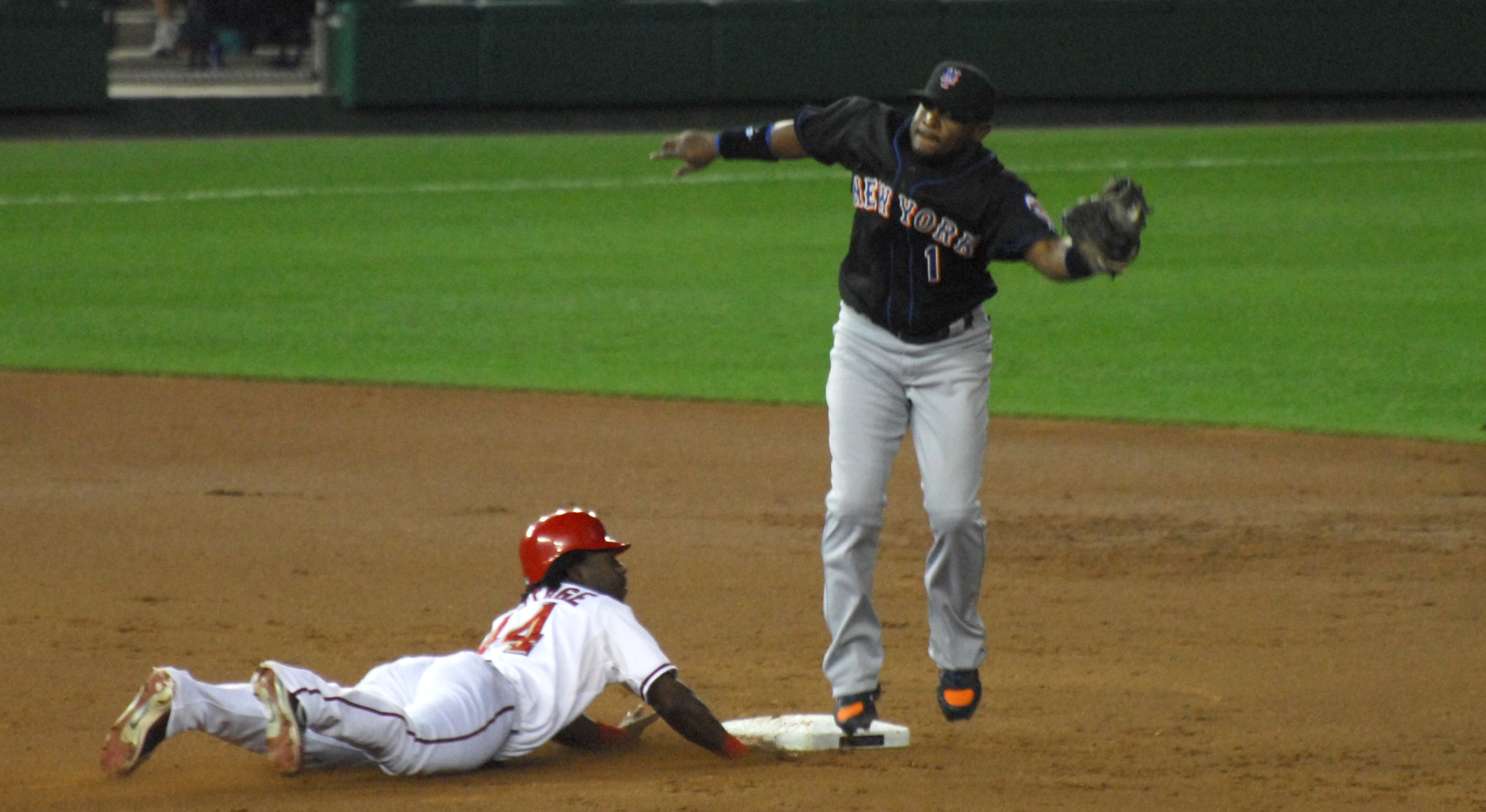
Lastings Milledge steals a base.

The first mention of the stolen base as a statistic was in the 1877 scoring rules adopted by the National League, which noted credit toward a player's total bases when a base is stolen. It was not until 1886 that the stolen base appeared as something to be tracked, but was only to "appear in the summary of the game".

In 1887, the stolen base was given its own individual statistical column in the box score, and was defined for purposes of scoring: "... every base made after first base has been reached by a base runner, except for those made by reason of or with the aid of a battery error (wild pitch or passed ball), or by batting, balks or by being forced off. In short, shall include all bases made by a clean steal, or through a wild throw or muff of the ball by a fielder who is directly trying to put the base runner out while attempting to steal." The next year, it was clarified that any attempt to steal must be credited to the runner, and that fielders committing errors during this play must also be charged with an error. This rule also clarified that advancement of another base(s) beyond the one being stolen is not credited as a stolen base on the same play, and that an error is charged to the fielder who permitted the extra advancement. There was clarification that a runner is credited with a steal if the attempt began before a battery error. Finally, batters were credited with a stolen base if they were tagged out after over running the base.

In 1892, a rule credited runners with stolen bases if a base runner advanced on a fly out, or if they advanced more than one base on any safe hit or attempted out, providing an attempt was made by the defense to put the runner out. The rule was rescinded in 1897.

In 1898, stolen base scoring was narrowed to no longer include advancement in the event of a fielding error, or advancement caused by a hit batsman.

1904 saw an attempt to reduce the already wordy slew of rules governing stolen bases, with the stolen base now credited when "the baserunner [sic] advances a base unaided by a base hit, a put out, (or) a fielding or batter error."

1910 saw the first addressing of the double and triple steal attempts. Under the new rule, when any runner is thrown out, and the other(s) are successful, the successful runners will not be credited with a stolen base.

Without using the term, 1920 saw the first rule that would be referred to today as defensive indifference, as stolen bases would not be credited, unless an effort was made to stop the runner by the defense. This is usually called if such is attempted in the ninth inning while that player's team is trailing, unless the runner represents the potential tying run.

1931 saw a further narrowing of the criteria for awarding a stolen base. Power was given to the official scorer, in the event of a muff by the catcher in throwing, that in the judgment of the scorer the runner would have been out, to credit the catcher with an error, and not credit the runner with a stolen base. Further, any successful steal on a play resulting in a wild pitch, passed ball, or balk would no longer be credited as a steal, even if the runner had started to steal before the play.

One of the largest rewrites to the rules in history came in 1950. The stolen base was specifically to be credited "to a runner whenever he advances one base unaided by a base hit, a putout, a forceout, a fielder's choice, a passed ball, a wild pitch, or a balk."

There were noted exceptions, such as denying a stolen base to an otherwise successful steal as a part of a double or triple steal, if one other runner was thrown out in the process. A stolen base would be awarded to runners who successfully stole second base as a part of a double steal with a man on third, if the other runner failed to steal home, but instead was able to return safely to third base. Runners who are tagged out oversliding the base after an otherwise successful steal would not be credited with a stolen base. Indifference was also credited as an exception. Runners would now be credited with stolen bases if they had begun the act of stealing, and the resulting pitch was wild, or a passed ball. Finally, for 1950 only, runners would be credited with a stolen base if they were "well advanced" toward the base they were attempting to steal, and the pitcher is charged with a balk, with the further exception of a player attempting to steal, who would otherwise have been forced to advance on the balk by a runner behind them. This rule was removed in 1951.

A clarification came in 1955 that awarded a stolen base to a runner even if he became involved in a rundown, provided he evaded the rundown and advanced to the base he intended to steal.

The criteria for "caught stealing" were fine-tuned in 1979, with a runner being charged with being caught if he is put out while trying to steal, overslides a base (otherwise successfully stolen), or is picked off a base and tries to advance to the next base. It is explicitly not caught stealing to be put out after a wild pitch or passed ball.

In 2023, base stealing increased due to new rules affecting pitchers: A pitch clock limited the amount of time a pitcher had to pitch and pickoff attempts were limited to two per at-bat. In addition, the bases were enlarged from 15 inches (38 cm) to 18 inches (46 cm), making stealing slightly easier.

== "Stealing first" ==
While not recorded as a stolen base, the same dynamic between batter/runner and defense is on display in the case of an uncaught third strike. The batter/runner can avoid an out and become a baserunner by reaching first base ahead of the throw. This case is a strikeout that is not an out; the batter/runner's acquisition of first base is scored as a passed ball, a wild pitch, or an error.

In baseball's earlier decades, a runner on second base could "steal" first base, perhaps with the intention of drawing a throw that might allow a runner on third to score (a tactic famously employed by Germany Schaefer). However, such a tactic was not recorded as a stolen base. MLB rules now forbid running clockwise on the basepaths to "confuse the defense or make a travesty of the game". Further, after the pitcher assumes the pitching position, runners cannot return to any previous base.

In a game on August 16, 1987, Toronto Blue Jays center fielder Lloyd Moseby successfully stole second base on a throwing error by Chicago White Sox catcher Carlton Fisk that went well into center field. However, shortstop Ozzie Guillen faked as if the batter had hit a popfly, which would have required Moseby to return to first base to avoid getting doubled off. Moseby made it back to first base, but another throwing error sent the ball to the infield wall, giving Moseby another chance to steal second, which he did. This chaos led the announcer to say, "He doesn't know where the throw is; he's going back to first base! Is he going to steal first? He steals first! Now he's going to steal second again! I've never seen it before!" This bizarre play was officially scored as a baserunner advancing on a throwing error by the center fielder, ironically resulting in neither a stolen base awarded nor an error charged to the catcher.

In a game on April 19, 2013, Milwaukee Brewers shortstop Jean Segura stole second base in the bottom of the eighth inning. After the batter up, Ryan Braun, walked, Segura broke early for third base and the pitcher, Shawn Camp of the Chicago Cubs, threw ahead of him. As Segura was chased back to second base, Braun advanced to second as well and was tagged out. Segura, thinking he was out, began to return to the home dugout behind first base, but first base coach Garth Iorg directed him to stand at first. Segura had not intentionally run the bases backwards as a deception or mockery, but no fielder tried to tag him out. Later in the inning, he attempted to steal second for the second time, but was thrown out by catcher Welington Castillo.

The expression "You can't steal first base" is sometimes used in reference to a player who is fast but not very good at getting on base in the first place.

Former Pittsburgh Pirates and Seattle Mariners manager Lloyd McClendon is jokingly referred to as having "stolen first" in a June 26, 2001, game as the manager of the Pirates: after being ejected for disputing a call at first base, he yanked the base out of the ground and left the field with it, delaying the game. Of the incident, McClendon said "I told him he wasn't using it, so I thought I'd take it." When a groundskeeper came out to replace the bag, the crowd booed him.

The independent Atlantic League instituted a new rule for the second half of the 2019 season, allowing batters to become runners on any pitch not "caught in flight" by the catcher, as they can throughout baseball after most uncaught third strikes. On July 13, 2019, outfielder Tony Thomas of the Southern Maryland Blue Crabs became the first player to reach first base under this rule. The press described this as "stealing first base", though it is scored as described above.

== See also ==
- Lead off
- Stolen base percentage
- List of Major League Baseball career stolen bases leaders
- List of Major League Baseball annual stolen base leaders
- List of Major League Baseball stolen base records
- List of KBO career stolen bases leaders
- List of CPBL stolen bases champions
- Stolen run (cricket)
