= CTBC Brothers =

Professional baseball team in the Chinese Professional Baseball League in Taiwan

- 中信兄弟
- Logo

Information
- League: Chinese Professional Baseball League
- Location: Taichung City
- Ballpark: Taichung Intercontinental Baseball Stadium (2015–present)
- Founded: 1989; 37 years ago
- Taiwan Series championships: 10 (1992, 1993, 1994, 2001, 2002, 2003, 2010, 2021, 2022, 2024)
- League championships: 21 (1992^{1} • 1992^{2} • 1993^{1} • 1994^{1} • 1994^{2} • 2001^{2} • 2002^{1} • 2002^{2} • 2003^{2} • 2009^{2} • 2010^{2} • 2014^{2} • 2015^{2} • 2016^{1} • 2019^{2} • 2020^{1} • 2021^{1} • 2022^{2} • 2024^{2} • 2025^{2} • 2026^{2})
- Playoff berths: 18 (1993, 2001, 2002, 2003, 2008, 2009, 2010, 2014, 2015, 2016, 2017, 2019, 2020, 2021, 2022, 2024, 2025, 2026)
- Former name: Brother Elephants (1990–2013)
- Former ballpark: Taipei Municipal Baseball Stadium (1990–2000)
- Colors: Navy blue and yellow
- Mascot: Sean, Albee
- Retired numbers: 23; 67
- Ownership: CTBC Financial Holding
- President: Chen Kuo-en
- General manager: Liu Chih-wei
- Manager: Keiichi Hirano
- Website: www.brothers.tw

Current uniforms
Home	Away

The CTBC Brothers (Chinese: 中信兄弟) or simply Brothers are a professional baseball team in Taiwan. The team was originally established as an amateur team in 1984 by the Brother Hotel located in Taipei City, and later joined the Chinese Professional Baseball League (CPBL) in 1989. Brother Hotel's chairman Hung Teng-sheng also acted as CPBL's secretary-general from 1987 to 1991. The Brothers are currently owned by CTBC Holding.

With a history dating back to the amateur era, the team has become one of Taiwan's most storied baseball franchises, winning the CPBL championship ten times.

The team has always worn yellow uniforms. Its current home is in Taichung, with the home field at the Taichung Intercontinental Baseball Stadium.

== History ==
On March 17, 1990, the Brother Elephants played the first historical CPBL game against the Uni-President Lions in the now-demolished Taipei Municipal Baseball Stadium with a full house of 14,350 in attendance. These two teams are also the only two remaining original teams of the CPBL.

Despite having the best season-long record for the 2004 season, the Elephants were unable to participate in the Taiwan Series because they had won neither half-season. This resulted in the expansion of the playoffs to three teams beginning in 2005, where the team with the best season-long record among non-champions for the season would gain a wildcard berth, thus preventing a similar occurrence in the future.

In mid-2008, general manager Hung Jui-he revealed the possibility of sale or disbanding of the organization if the financial deficit continued after 2009.

In the 2009 season, Brother Elephants were triumphant in winning the second half of the season. However, the team was affected deeply by a match fixing scandal involving relief pitcher Wu Pao-hsien which resulted in expulsion of many team players and the coach.

In October 2013, the team's president announced attempts to sell the team. The announcement drew interest from seven potential bidders. The team was sold to Hua Yi, a subdivision of CTBC Holding, by December 2013 for a price of NT$400 million. The team's name change reflected their new corporate parent, but it was felt that the branding from their previous owners was strong enough to rename the team Brothers, while retaining the elephant mascot. In 2022, the CTBC Holding officially purchased the team from Hua Yi.

== Records ==
Qualified for playoffs	Taiwan Series Championship

=== Regular seasons ===
Season	Wins	Losses	Ties	Winning pct.	Place
Brother Elephants
1990	34 (17/17)	49 (25/24)	7 (3/4)	.410 (.405/.415)	4 (3/4)
1991	38 (21/17)	49 (23/26)	3 (1/2)	.437 (.477/.395)	3 (3/4)
1992	51 (27/24)	35 (17/18)	4 (1/3)	.593 (.614/.571)	1 (1/1)
1993	52 (28/24)	36 (16/20)	2 (1/1)	.591 (.636/.545)	2 (1/2)
1994	64 (34/30)	24 (11/13)	2 (0/2)	.727 (.756/.698)	1 (1/1)
1995	48 (25/23)	51 (25/26)	1 (0/1)	.485 (.500/.469)	4 (3/3)
1996	52 (29/23)	43 (19/24)	5 (2/3)	.547 (.604/.489)	4 (2/4)
1997	45 (23/22)	44 (20/24)	7 (5/2)	.506 (.535/.478)	3 (3/5)
1998	33	69	3	0.324	6
1999	37	53	4	0.411	5
2000	38 (21/17)	48 (21/27)	4 (3/1)	.442 (.500/.386)	4 (3/4)
2001	44 (17/27)	39 (23/16)	7 (5/2)	.530 (.425/.628)	2 (3/1)
2002	53 (25/28)	33 (17/16)	4 (3/1)	.616 (.595/.636)	1 (1/1)
2003	63 (27/36)	31 (20/11)	6 (3/3)	.670 (.574/.766)	1 (3/1)
2004	54 (26/28)	45 (23/22)	1 (1/0)	.545 (.531/.560)	3 (3/2)
2005	47 (25/22)	49 (23/26)	4 (2/2)	.490 (.521/.458)	4 (3/6)
2006	40 (20/20)	59 (29/30)	1 (1/0)	.404 (.408/.400)	6 (5/6)
2007	49 (24/25)	50 (25/25)	1 (1/0)	.495 (.490/.500)	3 (4/4)
2008	52 (24/28)	42 (23/19)	4 (3/1)	.553 (.511/.596)	3 (3/3)
2009	54 (21/33)	63 (38/25)	3 (1/2)	.462 (.356/.569)	4 (4/1)
2010	61 (25/36)	57 (33/24)	2 (2/0)	.517 (.431/.600)	2 (3/1)
2011	60 (28/32)	60 (32/28)	0 (0/0)	.500 (.467/.533)	3 (3/2)
2012	60 (26/34)	58 (33/25)	2 (1/1)	.508 (.441/.576)	3 (3/2)
2013	55 (26/29)	65 (34/31)	0 (0/0)	.458 (.433/.483)	4 (4/3)
CTBC Brothers
2014	50 (19/31)	66 (40/26)	4 (1/3)	.431 (.322/.544)	4 (4/1)
2015	63 (27/36)	56 (33/23)	1 (0/1)	.529 (.450/.610)	2 (3/1)
2016	68 (35/33)	50 (23/27)	2 (2/0)	.576 (.603/.550)	1 (1/2)
2017	53 (30/23)	64 (27/37)	3 (3/0)	.453 (.526/.383)	3 (2/4)
2018	48 (20/28)	71 (40/31)	1 (0/1)	.403 (.333/.475)	4 (4/3)
2019	62 (26/36)	56 (32/24)	2 (2/0)	.525 (.448/.600)	3 (3/1)
2020	67 (37/30)	51 (23/28)	2 (0/2)	.568 (.617/.517)	1 (1/3)
2021	66 (35/31)	49 (24/25)	5 (1/4)	.574 (.593/.554)	1 (1/2)
2022	69 (32/37)	47 (26/21)	4 (2/2)	.595 (.552/.638)	2 (2/1)
2023	57 (28/29)	58 (28/30)	5 (4/1)	.496 (.500/.492)	4 (4/3)
2024	70 (32/38)	50 (28/22)	0 (0/0)	.583 (.533/.633)	1 (3/1)
2025	70 (34/36)	50 (26/24)	0 (0/0)	.583 (.566/.600)	1 (2/1)
2026	56 (20/36)	62 (38/24)	2 (2/0)	.475 (.345/.600)	5 (6/1)

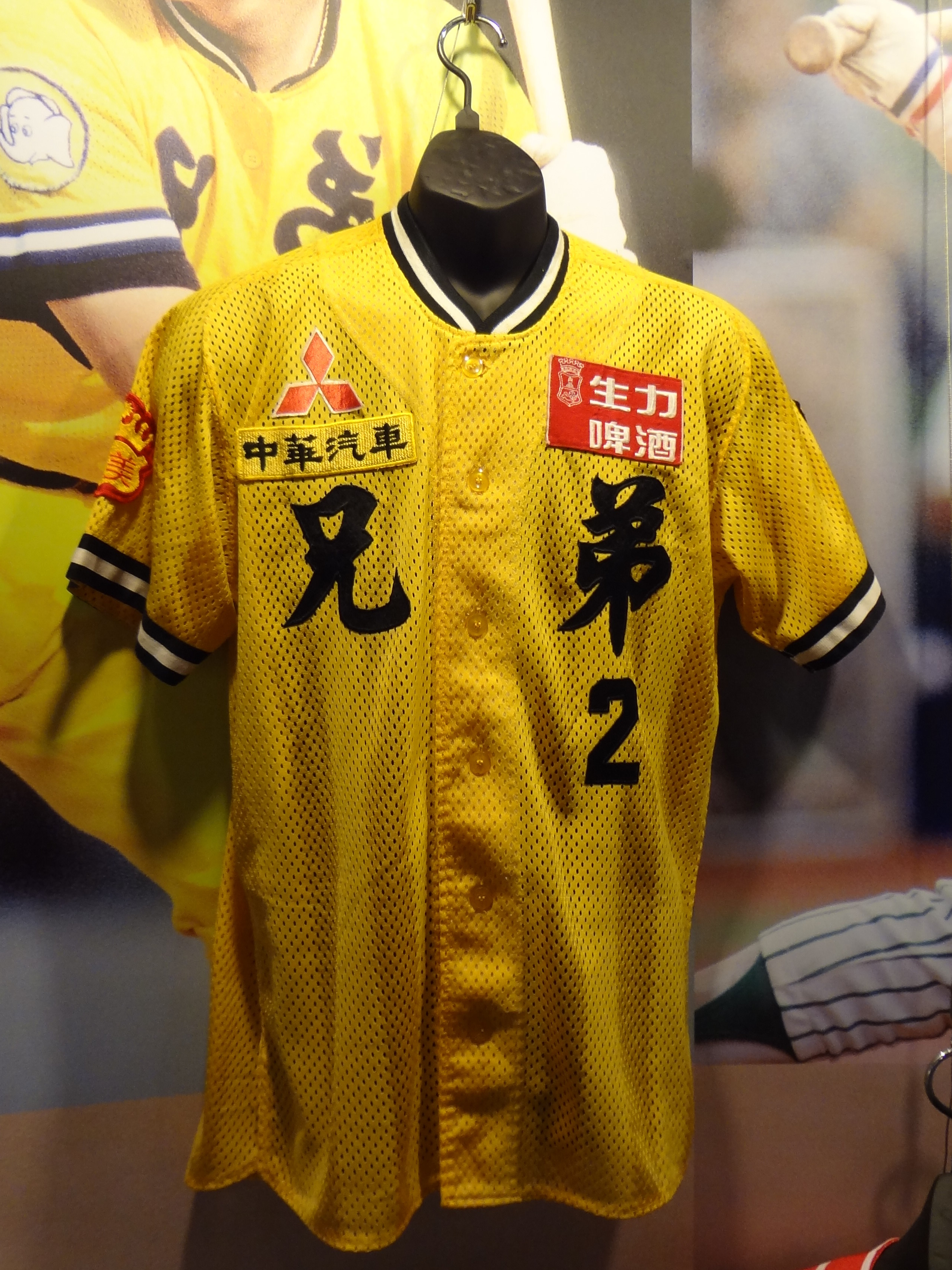
Brother Elephants uniform

=== Playoffs ===
Season	First round			Taiwan Series		
Season	Opponent	Wins	Losses	Opponent	Wins	Losses
Brother Elephants
1992	No playoffs. The Elephants won the championship by virtue of winning both half-seasons.					
1993	Did not play			Uni-President Lions	4	2
1994	No playoffs. The Elephants won the championship by virtue of winning both half-seasons.					
2001	Did not play			Uni-President Lions	4	3
2002	Did not play			Chinatrust Whales	4	0
2003	Did not play			Sinon Bulls	4	2
2008	La New Bears	3	0	Uni-President 7-Eleven Lions	3	4
2009	Did not play			Uni-President 7-Eleven Lions	3	4
2010	Did not play			Sinon Bulls	4	0
CTBC Brothers
2014	Did not play			Lamigo Monkeys	1	4
2015	Did not play			Lamigo Monkeys	3	4
2016	Did not play			EDA Rhinos	2	4
2017	Uni-President 7-Eleven Lions	3	1	Lamigo Monkeys	1	4
2019	Did not play			Lamigo Monkeys	1	4
2020	Did not play			Uni-President 7-Eleven Lions	3	4
2021	Did not play			Uni-President 7-Eleven Lions	4	0
2022	Wei Chuan Dragons	3	1	Rakuten Monkeys	4	0
2024	Did not play			Uni-President 7-Eleven Lions	4	1
2025	Did not play			Rakuten Monkeys	1	4
2026	Uni-President 7-Eleven Lions	3	2	Wei Chuan Dragons	2	4

== Roster ==
CTBC Brothers roster
Players			Coaches
Pitchers: 11 (Taiwan) Lin Chan-chang; 12 (Taiwan) Lin Huei-sheng; 14 (Taiwan) Wei Shuo-cheng; 15 (Taiwan) Wang Kai-cheng; 19 (Taiwan) Cheng Kai-wen; 20 (Taiwan) Chiang Chung-chen; 21 (Taiwan) Peng Shih-ying; 27 (Taiwan) You Jun-you; 30 (Venezuela) Mario Sanchez; 32 (Venezuela) Nivaldo Rodríguez; 33 (Taiwan) Cheng Hao-chun; 34 (Taiwan) Lee Chen-chang; 35 (Taiwan) Teng Chao-chun; 37 (Mexico) Humberto Castellanos; 41 (Taiwan) Yang Jhih-long; 46 (Dominican Republic) José de Paula; 49 (Taiwan) Yu Chien; 50 (Taiwan) Tsai Chi-che; 54 (Taiwan) Wang Yi-kai; 55 (Taiwan) Chu Hong-hua; 56 (Taiwan) Chen Po-chun; 58 (Taiwan) Lu Yen-ching; 59 (Taiwan) Feng Hao; 62 (Taiwan) Chen Hu; 64 (Taiwan) Huang En-sih; 70 (Taiwan) Hsu Chi-ling; 71 (Taiwan) Lu Meng-yang; 73 (Taiwan) Liu Yi-chih; 79 (Taiwan) Hsieh Jung-hao; 81 (Taiwan) Chen Kuan-ying; 83 (Taiwan) Wu Li-chen; 84 (Taiwan) Huang Hung-yi; 91 (Taiwan) Chang Tsu-en; 93 (Taiwan) Wu Che-yuan; 94 (Taiwan) Wu Chun-wei; 117 (Taiwan) Yang Tsun-kai	Catchers: 0 (Taiwan) Lin Wu Chin-wei; 48 (Taiwan) Chen Tong-en; 52 (Taiwan) Hu Meng-chih; 65 (Taiwan) Kao Yu-chieh; 72 (Taiwan) Chen Jiu-teng; 82 (Taiwan) Huang Chun-sheng; 97 (Taiwan) Hsu Po-wei; Infielders: 3 (Taiwan) Yang Siang-he; 4 (Taiwan) Chang Shr-lun; 9 (Taiwan) Wang Wei-chen; 17 (Taiwan) Huang Ting-shan; 28 (Taiwan) Chang Jen-wei; 29 (Taiwan) Chen Chun-hsiu; 47 (Taiwan) Lin Chih-kang; 61 (Taiwan) Wang Cheng-shun; 66 (Taiwan) Huang Wei-sheng; 68 (Taiwan) Ma Kang; 69 (Taiwan) Hsu Shao-yu; 74 (Taiwan) Hsu Chi-hung; 75 (Taiwan) Lin Jui-chun; 90 (Taiwan) Chiang Kun-yu; 96 (Taiwan) Su Wei-ta; 98 (Taiwan) Yueh Tung-hua; 116 (Taiwan) Huang Kuan-lun	Outfielders: 1 (Taiwan) Tseng Song-en; 2 (Taiwan) Li Sheng-yu; 7 (Taiwan) Chang Chih-hao; 13 (Taiwan) Hsu Ting-lun; 39 (Taiwan) Chan Tzu-hsien; 43 (Taiwan) Lin Shu-yi; 60 (Taiwan) Huang Jun-lin; 85 (Taiwan) Liu Kuei-yuan; 88 (Taiwan) Sung Cheng-jui; 92 (Taiwan) Yueh Cheng-hua; 115 (Taiwan) Chien Zih-kuan	Manager: 10 (Japan) Keiichi Hirano; Coaches: 5 (United States) Daniel Catalan (hitting); 22 (Taiwan) Huang Chih-feng (outfield/base running); 25 (United States) Sarah Edwards (hitting); 31 (Taiwan) Chen Chiang-ho (bench/hitting); 40 (Taiwan) Wang Chien-ming (pitching); 42 (Taiwan) Tsai Chung-en (strength and conditioning); 45 (Taiwan) Wang Chun-chieh (battery); 51 (Taiwan) Chen Hung-kuei (strength and conditioning); 53 (United States) Nick Additon (bullpen); 63 (Taiwan) Pan Chih-fang (fielding); Second team manager: 86 (Taiwan) Peng Cheng-min; Second team coaches: 6 (United States) Tack Wilson (base running); 8 (Taiwan) Kuo Feng-chun (assistant); 24 (Taiwan) Chen Pin-han (retrain); 36 (Taiwan) Shih Chih-wei (infield); 38 (Taiwan) Lin Cheng-hsuan (strength); 44 (United States) Mark Grater (rehabilitation/pitching); 57 (Taiwan) Chen Hao-jan (outfield); 76 (Taiwan) Lin Ming-hsien (bench); 77 (Taiwan) Chen Chih-hung (battery); 78 (Taiwan) Lin En-yu (pitching); 82 (Taiwan) Huang Chun-sheng (assistant); 87 (Taiwan) Hsu Hao-ming (hitting); 95 (Taiwan) Cheng Chi-hung (rehabilitation/pitching); 99 (Taiwan) Chou Lei (rehabilitation/pitching); Roster updated on 2 April 2025

=== Retired numbers ===
- 23 (Taiwan) Peng Cheng-min
- 67 (Taiwan) Tseng Chi-en

=== List of managers ===
==== Brother Elephants (1990–2013) ====
No.	Name	Years	Playoffs	Championships
1	Tseng Chi-en	1990–1991	0	0
2	Masao Morishita	1992	0	1
3	Toshihide Yamane	1993–1995	1	2
4	Chiang Chung-hao	1996–1998	0	0
5	Toshitake Nakayama	1999	0	0
6	Lin Pai-hen	2000–2001	0	0
7	Lin Yi-tseng	2001–2005	3	3
8	Wu Shih-hsih	2006	0	0
9	Wang Kuang-hui	2007–2009	1	0
10	Shin Nakagomi	2009	1	0
11	Chen Je-cheng	2010–2012	1	1
12	Hsieh Chang-heng	2013	0	0

==== CTBC Brothers (2014–present) ====
No.	Name	Years	Playoffs	Championships
—	Hsieh Chang-heng	2014–2015	1	0
13	Wu Fu-lian	2015–2016	2	0
14	Cory Snyder	2017–2018	1	0
15	Scott Budner	2019	1	0
16	Chiu Chang-jung	2020	1	0
17	Lin Wei-chu	2021–2023	2	2
18	Peng Cheng-min	2023	0	0
19	Keiichi Hirano	2024–present	3	1

== Notes ==
^1 First half-season champions
^2 Second half-season champions
