= CPBL Home Run Derby =

CPBL Home Run Derby is generally held before the day of the CPBL All-Star Game.

== List of the winners ==
1992: Lu Ming-tsi (Wei Chuan Dragons)
1993: Huang Chung-yi (Jungo Bears)
1994: Liao Ming-hsiung (China Times Eagles)
1995: Luis de los Santos (路易士 L.S.) (Brother Elephants)
1996: Luis Iglesias (鷹 俠 L.I.) (Mercuries Tigers)
1997: Lin Chung-chiu (Mercuries Tigers)
1998: Chang Tai-shan (Wei Chuan Dragons)
1999: Alex Cabrera (亞力士 A.C.) (Koos Group Whales)
2000: Lin Chung-chiu (Sinon Bulls, 2nd time)
2001: Chang Tai-shan (Sinon Bulls, 2nd time)
2002: Huang Chung-yi (Sinon Bulls, 2nd time)
2003: Chen Lien-hung (Uni-President Lions)
2004: Peng Cheng-min (Brother Elephants)
2005: Chen Kuan-jen (Brother Elephants)
2006: Huang Gueh-yu (Chinatrust Whales)
2007: Hsieh Chia-hsien (Macoto Cobras)
2008: Tilson Brito (布 雷 T.B.)* (Uni-President 7-Eleven Lions)
2009: Lin Chih-sheng (La New Bears)
2010: Kuo Chun-yu (Uni-President 7-Eleven Lions)
2011: Chung Cheng-yu (Lamigo Monkeys)
2012: Chung Cheng-yu (Lamigo Monkeys, 2nd time)
2013: Lin Yi-chuan (EDA Rhinos)
2014: Lan Yin-lun (Lamigo Monkeys)
2015: Lin Chih-sheng (Lamigo Monkeys, 2nd time)
2016: Lin Chih-sheng (CTBC Brothers, 3rd time)
2017: Yang Yao-hsun (Lamigo Monkeys)
2018: Andrew Campbell (Brisbane Bandits)
2019: Chun-Hsiu Chen (Lamigo Monkeys)
2020: Cancelled due to COVID-19 pandemic
2021: Cancelled due to COVID-19 pandemic
2022: Lin Chi-Hao (Uni-President 7-Eleven Lions)
2023: Lin An-ko (Uni-President 7-Eleven Lions)
2024: Steven Moya (魔鷹 S.M.) (TSG Hawks)
2025: Tseng Song-En(CTBC Brothers)

^{*} Making the record of the most home runs in annual contest and most home runs in a single round.

== See also ==
- Chinese Professional Baseball League
- CPBL All-Star Game
- Taiwan Series
