= 2011 Taiwan Series =

Team (Wins)	Managers	Season
Uni-President 7-Eleven Lions (4)	Lu Wen-sheng	65-3-52, .556
Lamigo Monkeys (1)	Hung Yi-chung	66-2-52, .559
- Dates: October 15–October 20
- MVP: Ching-Ming Wang
- Manager of the Year: Lu Wen-sheng

Broadcast
- Television: Videoland Television Network

The 2011 Taiwan Series was played by Uni-President 7-Eleven Lions and Lamigo Monkeys, winners of the first and second half-seasons. The Lions won the title of 2011 Taiwan Series four games to one and will represent Taiwan in the 2011 Asia Series.

== Participants ==
- Uni-President 7-Eleven Lions - Winner of the first half-season.
- Lamigo Monkeys - Winner of the second half-season.

The two teams also played each other in the 2006 and 2007 Taiwan Series; the Monkeys defeated the Lions in 2006, but the Lions claimed the title in 2007. The two teams also played each other in the 2006 and 2007 Taiwan Series; the Monkeys defeated the Lions in 2006, but the Lions claimed the title in 2007.

== Rules ==
All regular season rules apply with the following exceptions:

- Each team is allowed to register 28 players on its active roster.
- No tied games.
- Two outfield umpires are added to the games.

== Summaries ==
=== Game 1 ===
October 15, 2011 at Taoyuan International Baseball Stadium, Taoyuan County

Team	1	2	3	4	5	6	7	8	9	R	H	E
Uni-President 7-Eleven	0	0	0	0	0	3	0	0	0	3	9	0
Lamigo	0	0	1	0	0	1	0	0	0	2	10	2
WP: Seth Etherton (1–0) LP: Ken Ray (0–1) Sv: Lin Yueh-ping (1); Attendance: 11,113

=== Game 2 ===
October 16, 2011 at Taoyuan International Baseball Stadium, Taoyuan County

Team	1	2	3	4	5	6	7	8	9	10	11	12	13	R	H	E
Uni-President 7-Eleven	3	0	0	0	0	0	0	4	0	0	0	0	1	8	14	3
Lamigo	1	0	0	0	0	0	0	3	3	0	0	0	0	7	11	0
WP: Ching-Ming Wang (1-0) LP: Lin Chia-wei (0-1) Sv: Lin Cheng-feng (1); Home runs: UNI: Liu Fu-hao (1), Kao Kuo-ching (1); LAM: Lin Hung-yu (1); Attendance: 10105

=== Game 3 ===
October 18, 2011 at Tainan Municipal Baseball Stadium, Tainan City

Team	1	2	3	4	5	6	7	8	9	R	H	E
Lamigo	0	0	0	4	0	0	0	0	0	4	6	1
Uni-President 7-Eleven	0	0	0	1	0	0	0	0	0	1	6	0
WP: Wang Feng-hsin (1-0) LP: Liao Wen-yang (0-1); Home runs: LAM: Chen Chin-feng (1); UNI: None; Attendance: 6062

=== Game 4 ===
October 19, 2011 at Tainan Municipal Baseball Stadium, Tainan City

Team	1	2	3	4	5	6	7	8	9	R	H	E
Lamigo	1	0	0	1	0	0	0	0	0	2	4	1
Uni-President 7-Eleven	1	0	0	0	0	1	0	1	X	3	5	1
WP: Ching-Ming Wang (2-0) LP: Huang Chin-chih (0-1) Sv: Lin Yueh-ping (2); Home runs: LAM: Tsai Chien-wei (1); UNI: Chen Yung-chi (1); Attendance: 7518

=== Game 5 ===
October 20, 2011 at Tainan Municipal Baseball Stadium, Tainan City

Team	1	2	3	4	5	6	7	8	9	R	H	E
Lamigo	0	1	2	2	0	1	0	0	0	6	12	1
Uni-President 7-Eleven	4	0	2	0	1	1	0	2	X	10	12	1
WP: Ching-Ming Wang (3-0) LP: Ken Ray (0-2) Sv: Lin Yueh-ping (3); Home runs: LAM: Tseng Hao-chu (1), Lin Chih-sheng (1); UNI: Chang Tai-shan (1), Pan Wu-hsiung (1); Attendance: 10718
