= Lin Hung-yu =

Taiwanese baseball player (born 1986)

Rakuten Monkeys – No. 11
- Catcher
- Born: March 21, 1986 (age 39); Tainan, Taiwan
- Bats: Right Throws: Right

CPBL debut
- March 21, 2010, for the La New Bears

CPBL statistics (through 2025 season)
- Batting average: .323
- Hits: 1,877
- Home runs: 216
- Runs batted in: 1,104
- Stats at Baseball Reference

Teams
- La New Bears / Lamigo Monkeys / Rakuten Monkeys (2010–present)

Career highlights and awards
- 7x Taiwan Series champion (2012, 2014–2015, 2017–2019, 2025); CPBL MVP of the Year (2011)

Lin Hung-yu (Chinese: 林泓育; pinyin: Lín Hóng-yù; born March 21, 1986) is a Taiwanese professional baseball catcher for the Rakuten Monkeys of the Chinese Professional Baseball League (CPBL).

== Career ==
In 2008, Lin was drafted by the La New Bears and assigned to their minor league team.

Lin made his pro debut on March 20 with the La New Bears, hitting 5th behind Chin-Feng Chen and catching for a team depleted by a gambling scandal over the offseason. Lin had a strong debut, going 2 for 4. He hit .303/.337/.434 as a rookie in 2010 but did not take home Rookie of the Year honors, which went instead to pitcher Ching-Ming Wang. He ranked among the CPBL leaders in average (5th, after Cheng-Min Peng, Yi-Chuan Lin, Tai-Shan Chang and Chih-Sheng Lin), doubles (tied for 6th with 22), RBI (66, 3rd behind Chih-Sheng Lin and Tai-Shan Chang) and slugging (6th behind Chih-Sheng Lin, Cheng-Min Peng, Tai-Shan Chang, Yi-Chuan Lin and Chen-Yu Chung).

In 2011, Lin was better yet at .321/.378/.544 with 22 home runs and 106 RBI for the Lamigo Monkeys (the Bears having changed their name in the offseason). He was among the leaders in average (6th behind Cheng-Wei Chang, Chih-Sheng Lin, Kuo-Ching Kao, Kuan-Jen Chen and Chen-Yu Chung), slugging (3rd behind Chih-Sheng Lin and Kuo-Ching Kao), OPS (behind Chih-Sheng Lin and Kuo-Ching Kao), OBP (8th), doubles (tied for 6th with Yen-Wen Kuo at 28), RBI (1st, 18 more than runner-up Ssu-Chi Chou), home runs (tied for the lead with Kuo-Ching Kao) and runs (78, 4th after Cheng-Wei Chang, Fu-Hao Liu and Chih-Hao Chang).

Lin made 105 appearances for Rakuten in 2025, slashing .307/.345/.415 with nine home runs and 60 RBI. With the Monkeys, Lin won the 2025 Taiwan Series.

== International career ==
He was selected Chinese Taipei national baseball team at the 2006 World University Baseball Championship, 2006 Haarlem Baseball Week, 2009 World Port Tournament, 2009 Baseball World Cup, 2013 World Baseball Classic, 2015 WBSC Premier12 and 2018 MLB Japan All-Star Series exhibition game against Japan.

In the 2009 World Port Tournament, Lin hit .296/.345/.407 as a C-DH, splitting backstop duties with Kun-Sheng Lin. He was with Taiwan for the 2009 Asian Baseball Championship.

In 2009 Baseball World Cup, serving as their cleanup hitter and DH. He hit .241/.250/.500 with a team-high four homers and 16 RBI in 15 games, showing great power but poor OBP and strikeout skills. He had game-winning hits against Australia (a 10th-inning, 2-run homer off Paul Mildren to end it) and Japan (a 10th-inning, 2-run single).

Awards
Preceded by Lin Chih-sheng(林智勝)	CPBL Home Run Champion Award; 2011	Succeeded by Lin Chih-sheng(林智勝)
Preceded by Lin Chih-sheng(林智勝)	CPBL RBI Champion Award; 2011	Succeeded by Chang Tai-shan(張泰山)
Preceded by Peng Cheng-min(彭政閔)	CPBL MVP of the Year Award; 2011	Succeeded by Chou Ssu-chi(周思齊)
