= List of CPBL batting champions =

The batting championship is awarded to the Chinese Professional Baseball League player who has the highest batting average in a particular season.

Currently, a player needs to accrue an average of at least 3.1 plate appearances for each game his team plays in order to qualify for the batting title.

== Champions ==
Year	Player	Team	Batting average
1990	(Taiwan) Wang Kuang-hui (王光輝)	Brother Elephants	.342
1991	(Panama) Luis Iglesias (鷹 俠L.I.)	Mercuries Tigers	.331
1992	(Dominican Republic) Juan Castillo (卡 羅J.C.)	Uni-President Lions	.326
1993	(Taiwan) Tseng Kui-chang (曾貴章)	China Times Eagles	.337
1994	(Dominican Republic) Angel Gonzalez (康 雷A.G)	Mercuries Tigers	.360
1995	(Dominican Republic) Angel Gonzalez (康 雷A.G)	Mercuries Tigers	.354
1996	(Dominican Republic) Luis de los Santos (路易士L.S.)	Brother Elephants	.375
1997	(United States) Robert Wood (德 伍R.W.)	Brother Elephants	.373
1998	(United States) Jay Kirkpatrick (怪力男J.K.)	Sinon Bulls	.387
1999	(Taiwan) Hong Chi-feng (洪啟峰)	Chinatrust Whales	.333
2000	(Taiwan) Huang Chung-Yi (黃忠義)	Sinon Bulls	.354
2001	(Taiwan) Lou Min-ching (羅敏卿)	Uni-President Lions	.357
2002	(Taiwan) Chen Chien-wei (陳健偉)	Chinatrust Whales	.334
2003	(Taiwan) Peng Cheng-min (彭政閔)	Brother Elephants	.355
2004	(Taiwan) Peng Cheng-min (彭政閔)	Brother Elephants	.376
2005	(Taiwan) Peng Cheng-min (彭政閔)	Brother Elephants	.339
2006	(Taiwan) Chen Kuan-jen (陳冠任)	Brother Elephants	.349
2007	(Taiwan) Chen Chin-Feng (陳金鋒)	La New Bears	.382
2008	(Taiwan) Peng Cheng-min (彭政閔)	Brother Elephants	.391
2009	(Taiwan) Pan Wu-hsiung (潘武雄)	Uni-President Lions	.367
2010	(Taiwan) Peng Cheng-min (彭政閔)	Brother Elephants	.357
2011	(Taiwan) Chang Cheng-wei (張正偉)	Brother Elephants	.351
2012	(Taiwan) Pan Wu-hsiung (潘武雄)	Uni-President 7-Eleven Lions	.388
2013	(Taiwan) Lin Yi-Chuan (林益全)	EDA Rhinos	.357
2014	(Taiwan) Hu Chin-Lung (胡金龍)	EDA Rhinos	.350
2015	(Taiwan) Hu Chin-Lung (胡金龍)	EDA Rhinos	.383
2016	(Taiwan) Wang Po-Jung (王柏融)	Lamigo Monkeys	.414
2017	(Taiwan) Wang Po-Jung (王柏融)	Lamigo Monkeys	.407
2018	(Taiwan) Chen Chieh-Hsiu (陳俊秀)	Lamigo Monkeys	.375
2019	(Taiwan) Lin Li (林 立)	Lamigo Monkeys	.389
2020	(Taiwan) Chen Chieh-Hsien (陳傑憲)	Uni-President 7-Eleven Lions	.360
2021	(Taiwan) Chen Chieh-Hsiu (陳俊秀)	Rakuten Monkeys	.352
2022	(Taiwan) Lin Li (林 立)	Rakuten Monkeys	.335
2023	(Taiwan) Liang Chia-Jung (梁家榮)	Rakuten Monkeys	.338
2024	(Taiwan) Lin Li (林 立)	Rakuten Monkeys	.353
2025	(Taiwan) Wu Nien-Ting (吳念庭)	TSG Hawks	.328
2026	(Taiwan) Chen Chieh-Hsien (陳傑憲)	Uni-President 7-Eleven Lions	.322
