= List of CPBL RBI champions =

Chinese Professional Baseball League recognizes runs batted in champions each season.

== Champions ==
| Year | Player | Team | RBI |
|---|---|---|---|
| 1990 | (Panama) Luis Iglesias (鷹 俠L.I.) | Mercuries Tigers | 58 |
| 1991 | (United States) Jim Ward (吉 彌J.W.) | Uni-President Lions | 59 |
| 1992 | (Dominican Republic) Francisco Laureano (林 克F.L.) | Uni-President Lions | 68 |
| 1993 | (Taiwan) Liao Ming-Hsiung (廖敏雄) | China Times Eagles | 60 |
| 1994 | (United States) George Hinshaw (喬 治G.H.) | China Times Eagles | 78 |
| 1995 | (Dominican Republic) Luis de los Santos (路易士L.S.) | Brother Elephants | 72 |
| 1996 | (Panama) Luis Iglesias (鷹 俠L.I.) | Mercuries Tigers | 90 |
| 1997 | (United States) Robert Wood (德 伍R.W.) | Brother Elephants | 94 |
| 1998 | (United States) Jay Kirkpatrick (怪力男J.K.) | Sinon Bulls | 101 |
| 1999 | (Taiwan) Chang Tai-shan (張泰山) | Sinon Bulls | 70 |
| 2000 | (Taiwan) Huang Chung-Yi (黃忠義) | Sinon Bulls | 51 |
| 2001 | (Taiwan) Lin Chung-chiu (林仲秋) | Sinon Bulls | 54 |
| 2002 | (Taiwan) Tsai Feng-ang (蔡豐安) | Brother Elephants | 84 |
| 2003 | (Taiwan) Chen Chih-yuan (陳致遠) | Brother Elephants | 97 |
| 2004 | (Taiwan) Chang Tai-shan (張泰山) | Sinon Bulls | 94 |
| 2005 | (Taiwan) Hsieh Chia-hsien (謝佳賢) | Macoto Cobras | 74 |
| 2006 | (Taiwan) Chen Chin-Feng (陳金鋒) | La New Bears | 81 |
| 2007 | (Dominican Republic) Tilson Brito (布 雷T.B.) | Uni-President Lions | 107 |
| 2008 | (Dominican Republic) Tilson Brito (布 雷T.B.) | Uni-President 7-Eleven Lions | 102 |
| 2009 | (Taiwan) Lin Yi-chuan (林益全) | Sinon Bulls | 113 |
| 2010 | (Taiwan) Lin Chih-sheng (林智勝) | Lamigo Monkeys | 79 |
| 2011 | (Taiwan) Lin Hung-yu (林泓育) | Lamigo Monkeys | 106 |
| 2012 | (Taiwan) Chang Tai-shan (張泰山) | Uni-President 7-Eleven Lions | 96 |
| 2013 | (Taiwan) Chang Tai-shan (張泰山) | Uni-President 7-Eleven Lions | 90 |
| 2014 | (Taiwan) Lin Yi-chuan (林益全) | EDA Rhinos | 88 |
| 2015 | (Taiwan) Lin Yi-chuan (林益全) | EDA Rhinos | 126 |
| 2016 | (Taiwan) Lin Hung-yu (林泓育) | La Migo Monkeys | 108 |
| 2017 | (Taiwan) Wang Po-jung (王柏融) | La Migo Monkeys | 101 |
| 2018 | (Taiwan) Hsieh Chia-hsien (謝佳賢) | Fubon Guardians | 89 |
| 2019 | (Taiwan) Lin Yi-chuan (林益全) | Fubon Guardians | 108 |
| 2020 | (Taiwan) Lin An-Ko (林安可) | Uni-President Lions | 99 |
| 2021 | (Taiwan) Chu Yu-Hsien (朱育賢) | Rakuten Monkeys | 81 |
| 2022 | (Taiwan) Lin Li (林 立) | Rakuten Monkeys | 83 |
| 2023 | (Taiwan) Liao Chien-Fu (廖健富) | Rakuten Monkeys | 83 |
| 2024 | (Dominican Republic) Steven Moya (魔 鷹S.M.) | TSG Hawks | 99 |
| 2025 | (Taiwan) Giljegiljaw Kungkuan (吉力吉撈·鞏冠) | Wei Chuan Dragons | 86 |
| 2026 | (Dominican Republic) Steven Moya (魔 鷹S.M.) | TSG Hawks | 90 |
