= List of CPBL hits champions =

The Chinese Professional Baseball League recognizes hit champions in each season; the champions have been awarded from 1994.

== Champions ==
| Year | Player | Team | Hits |
|---|---|---|---|
| 1990 | (Taiwan) Lin Yi-tseng (林易增) | Wei Chuan Dragons | 116 |
| 1991 | (United States) Jim Ward (吉 彌J.W.) | Wei Chuan Dragons | 101 |
| 1992 | (Taiwan) Lou Min-ching (羅敏卿) | Uni-President Lions | 104 |
| 1993 | (Taiwan) Tseng Kui-chang (曾貴章) | China Times Eagles | 109 |
| 1994 | (Dominican Republic) Luis de los Santos (路易士L.S.) | Brother Elephants | 125 |
| 1995 | (Dominican Republic) Luis de los Santos (路易士L.S.) | Brother Elephants | 136 |
| 1996 | (Taiwan) Tseng Kui-chang (曾貴章) | China Times Eagles | 143 |
| 1997 | (United States) Robert Wood (德 伍R.W.) | Brother Elephants | 139 |
| 1998 | (United States) Jay Kirkpatrick (怪力男J.K.) | Sinon Bulls | 137 |
| 1999 | (Dominican Republic) Juan Parra (百 樂J.P.) | Chinatrust Whales | 111 |
| 2000 | (Taiwan) Huang Chung-Yi (黃忠義) | Sinon Bulls | 115 |
| 2001 | (Taiwan) Yang Sung-hsien (楊松弦) | Chinatrust Whales | 105 |
| 2002 | (Taiwan) Huang Chung-Yi (黃忠義) | Sinon Bulls | 107 |
| 2003 | (Taiwan) Chen Chih-yuan (陳致遠) | Brother Elephants | 137 |
| 2004 | (Taiwan) Peng Cheng-min (彭政閔) | Brother Elephants | 127 |
| 2005 | (Taiwan) Yang Sen (陽 森) | Uni-President Lions | 121 |
| 2006 | (Taiwan) Chang Tai-shan (張泰山) | Sinon Bulls | 130 |
| 2007 | (Taiwan) Kao Kuo-ching (高國慶) | Uni-President Lions | 152 |
| 2008 | (Taiwan) Chen Kuan-jen (陳冠任) | Brother Elephants | 139 |
| 2009 | (Dominican Republic) Wilton Veras (威納斯W.V.) | Sinon Bulls | 176 |
| 2010 | (Taiwan) Chang Tai-shan (張泰山) | Sinon Bulls | 142 |
| 2011 | (Taiwan) Chang Cheng-wei (張正偉) | Brother Elephants | 170 |
| 2012 | (Taiwan) Chang Cheng-wei (張正偉) | Brother Elephants | 172 |
| 2013 | (Taiwan) Lin Yi-chuan (林益全) | EDA Rhinos | 149 |
| 2014 | (Taiwan) Chin-Lung Hu (胡金龍) | EDA Rhinos | 162 |
| 2015 | (Taiwan) Chin-Lung Hu (胡金龍) | EDA Rhinos | 171 |
| 2016 | (Taiwan) Wang Po-jung (王柏融) | Lamigo Monkeys | 200 |
| 2017 | (Taiwan) Wang Po-jung (王柏融) | Lamigo Monkeys | 178 |
| 2018 | (Taiwan) Chen Chieh-Hsien (陳傑憲) | Uni-President 7-Eleven Lions | 165 |
| 2019 | (Taiwan) Chu Yu-Hsien (朱育賢) | Lamigo Monkeys | 159 |
| 2020 | (Taiwan) Chen Chieh-Hsien (陳傑憲) | Uni-President 7-Eleven Lions | 174 |
| 2021 | (Taiwan) Wang Wei-Chen (王威晨) | CTBC Brothers | 159 |
| 2022 | (Taiwan) Lin Li (林 立) | Rakuten Monkeys | 140 |
| 2023 | (Taiwan) Liu Chi-Hong (劉基鴻) | Wei Chuan Dragons | 136 |
| 2024 | (Taiwan) Chiu Chih-Cheng (邱智呈) | Uni-President 7-Eleven Lions | 145 |
| 2025 | (Taiwan) Li Kai-Wei (李凱威) | Wei Chuan Dragons | 134 |
| 2026 | (Dominican Republic) Steven Moya (魔 鷹S.M.) | TSG Hawks | 126 |
