= List of CPBL wins champions =

CPBL recognizes wins champions in each season.

== Champions ==
Year	Player	Chinese name	Team	Wins
1990	(Taiwan) Huang Ping-yang	黃平洋	Wei Chuan Dragons	20
1991	(United States) Joseph Strong	史東	Wei Chuan Dragons	15
1992	(Taiwan) Chen Yi-hsin	陳義信	Brother Elephants	16
1993	(Dominican Republic) Jose Nunez	王漢 J.N.	Uni-President Lions	22
1994	(Taiwan) Chen Yi-hsin	陳義信	Brother Elephants	22
1995	(Taiwan) Kuo Chin-hsing	郭進興	Uni-President Lions	20
1996	(Taiwan) Kuo Chin-hsing	郭進興	Uni-President Lions	20
1997	(Taiwan) Wu Chun-liang	吳俊良	Uni-President Lions	15
1998	(United States) Mark Kiefer	楓康 M.K.	Sinon Bulls	17
1999	(United States) Kevin Henthorne	凱文 K.H.	Koos Group Whales	15
2000	(United States) Mark Kiefer	楓康 M.K.	Sinon Bulls	20
2001	(Puerto Rico) John Burgos	柏格 J.B.	Uni-President Lions	18
2002	(Taiwan) Sung Chao-chi	宋肇基	Chinatrust Whales	16
2003	(Japan) Yokota Hisanori	橫田久則	Brother Elephants	16
2004	(United States) Jonathan Hurst	風神 J.H.	Brother Elephants	17
2005	(Panama) Lenin Picota	戰玉飛 L.P.	Sinon Bulls	16
2006	(Taiwan) Lin En-yu	林恩宇	Macoto Cobras	17
2007	(Taiwan) Pan Wei-lun	潘威倫	Uni-President Lions	16
2008	(Canada) Mike Johnson	強森 M.J.	La New Bears	20
2009	(Japan) Shoda Itsuki	正田樹	Sinon Bulls	14
2010	(United States) Carlos Castillo	卡斯帝 C.C.	Brother Elephants	14
2011	(Puerto Rico) Orlando Roman	羅曼 O.R.	Brother Elephants	16
2012	(Japan) Yuya Kamada	鎌田祐哉	Uni-President 7-Eleven Lions	16
2013	(Taiwan) Lin Chen-hua	林晨樺	EDA Rhinos	15
2014	(Taiwan) Cheng Kai-wen	鄭凱文	CTBC Brothers	11
2015	(United States) Mike Loree	羅力 M.L>	EDA Rhinos	16
2016	(United States) Mike Loree	羅力 M.L>	EDA Rhinos	13
2017	(United States) Mike Loree	羅力 M.L>	Fubon Guardians	16
2018	(United States) Bryan Woodall	伍鐸 B.W.	Fubon Guardians	14
2019	(Dominican Republic) Radhames Liz	李茲 R.L.	Lamigo Monkeys	16
2020	(Dominican Republic) José de Paula	德保拉 J.P.	CTBC Brothers	16
2021	(Canada) Brock Dykxhoorn	布雷克 B.D.	Uni-President 7-Eleven Lions	17
2022	(Dominican Republic) José de Paula	德保拉 J.P.	CTBC Brothers	14
2023	(United States) Andrew Miles Gagnon	鋼龍 A.G.	Wei Chuan Dragons	13
2024	(Venezuela) Mario Sanchez	勝騎士 M.S.	Uni-President 7-Eleven Lions	14
2025	(Dominican Republic) Pedro Fernandez	威能帝 P.F.	Rakuten Monkeys	15
2026	(Venezuela) Nivaldo Rodríguez	(羅 戈N.R.)	CTBC Brothers	12
