= List of CPBL home run champions =

Chinese Professional Baseball League recognizes home run champions each season.

== Champions ==
Year	Player	Team	Home runs
1990	(Panama) Luis Iglesias (鷹 俠L.I.)	Mercuries Tigers	18
1991	(Taiwan) Lin Chung-chiu (林仲秋)	Mercuries Tigers	16
1992	(Taiwan) Lin Chung-chiu (林仲秋)	Mercuries Tigers	24
1993	(Dominican Republic) Leonardo García (哥 雅L.G.)	Mercuries Tigers	20
1994	(Dominican Republic) Silvestre Campusano (坎沙諾S.C.)	Wei Chuan Dragons	25
1995	(Taiwan) Liao Ming-Hsiung (廖敏雄)	China Times Eagles	22
1996	(Panama) Luis Iglesias (鷹 俠L.I.)	Mercuries Tigers	31
1997	(Puerto Rico) Fredinand Rodriguez(羅 得F.R.)	Uni-President Lions	27
1998	(United States) Jay Kirkpatrick (怪力男J.K.)	Sinon Bulls	31
1999	(United States) Robert Wood (德 伍R.W.)	Brother Elephants	19
2000	(Taiwan) Lin Chung-chiu (林仲秋)	Sinon Bulls	15
2001	(Taiwan) Lin Chung-chiu (林仲秋)	Sinon Bulls	18
2002	(Taiwan) Chen Wen-bin (陳文賓)	Chinatrust Whales	26
2003	(Taiwan) Chang Tai-shan (張泰山)	Sinon Bulls	28
2004	(Taiwan) Chang Tai-shan (張泰山)	Sinon Bulls	21
2005	(Taiwan) Hsieh Chia-hsien (謝佳賢)	Macoto Cobras	23
2006	(Taiwan) Chang Tai-shan (張泰山)	Sinon Bulls	24
2007	(Dominican Republic) Tilson Brito (布 雷T.B.)	Uni-President Lions	33
2008	(Dominican Republic) Tilson Brito (布 雷T.B.)	Uni-President Lions	24
2009	(Taiwan) Lin Chih-sheng (林智勝)	La New Bears	31
2010	(Taiwan) Lin Chih-sheng (林智勝)	La New Bears	21
2011	(Taiwan) Lin Hong-yu (林泓育)	Lamigo Monkeys	22
2012	(Taiwan) Lin Chih-sheng (林智勝)	Lamigo Monkeys	24
2013	(Taiwan) Lin Yi-chuan (林益全)	EDA Rhinos	24
2014	(Taiwan) Kuo-Hui Kao (高國輝)	EDA Rhinos	18
2015	(Taiwan) Kuo-Hui Kao (高國輝)	EDA Rhinos	39
2016	(Taiwan) Kuo-Hui Kao (高國輝)	EDA Rhinos	34
2017	(Taiwan) Wang Po-Jung (王柏融)	Lamigo Monkeys	31
2018	(Taiwan) Chang Chih-hao (張志豪)	CTBC Brothers	22
2019	(Taiwan) Chu Yu-Hsien (朱育賢)	Lamigo Monkeys	30
2020	(Taiwan) Lin An-Ko (林安可)	Uni-President Lions	32
2021	(Taiwan) Chu Yu-Hsien (朱育賢)	Rakuten Monkeys	22
2022	(Taiwan) Giljegiljaw Kungkuan (吉力吉撈．鞏冠)	Wei Chuan Dragons	14
2023	(Taiwan) Giljegiljaw Kungkuan (吉力吉撈．鞏冠)	Wei Chuan Dragons	23
2024	(Dominican Republic) Steven Moya (魔 鷹S.M.)	TSG Hawks	30
2025	(Dominican Republic) Steven Moya (魔 鷹S.M.)	TSG Hawks	25
2026	(Dominican Republic) Steven Moya (魔 鷹S.M.)	TSG Hawks	20
