= Chen Chih-yuan =

Taiwanese baseball player

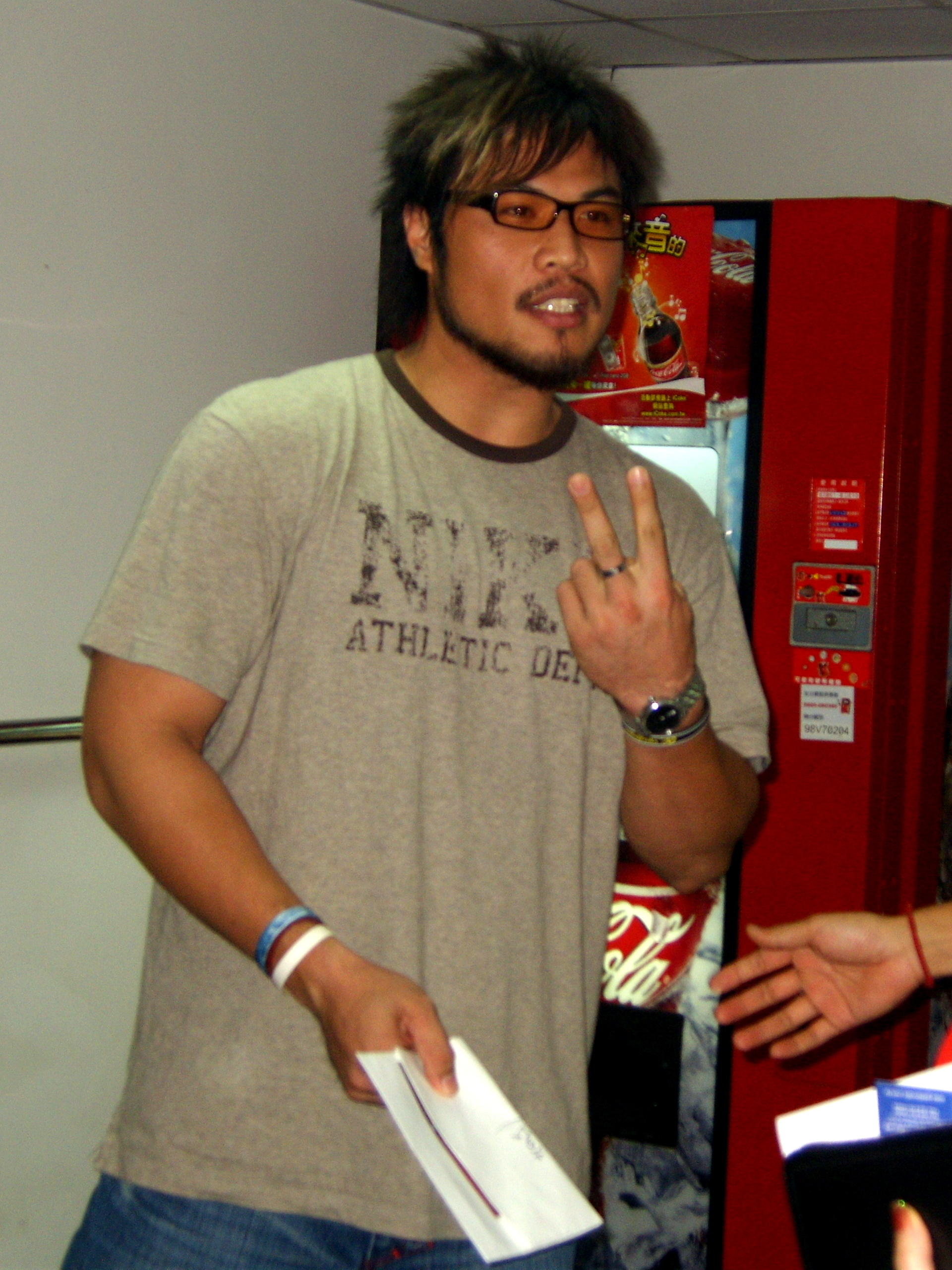
- Left fielder
- Born: October 27, 1976 (age 49); Taoyuan County (now Taoyuan City), Taiwan
- Bats: Right Throws: Right

CPBL debut
- July 19, 2001, for the Brother Elephants

Career statistics (through 2009)
- Batting average: .303
- Home runs: 83
- Runs batted in: 400
- Stolen base: 125
- Runs: 440
- Stats at Baseball Reference

Teams
- Brother Elephants (2001–2009)

Career highlights and awards
- CPBL Rookie of the Year (2001)
Medals
Representing Chinese Taipei
Men's baseball
Baseball World Cup
Bronze medal – third place	2001 Taipei	Team
Asian Games
Bronze medal – third place	1998 Bangkok	Team
Silver medal – second place	2002 Busan	Team
Asian Baseball Championship
Bronze medal – third place	1997 Taipei	Team
Bronze medal – third place	1999 Seoul	Team
Gold medal – first place	2001 Taipei	Team
Silver medal – second place	2003 Sapporo	Team

Chen Chih-yuan (Chinese: 陳致遠; Wade–Giles: Chen^{2} Chih^{4} Yuan^{3}; born October 27, 1976, in Taoyuan County, Taiwan) is a Taiwanese aborigine (tribe: Amis) former professional baseball player (position: outfielder).

== Career ==
A well-known slugger since college era in the Fu Jen Catholic University, Chen had been a frequent member of the Chinese Taipei national baseball team between 1997 and 2004, participating the 2004 Summer Olympics in which he hit a home run in the match against Greece. In professional career, Chen joined the Brother Elephants of CPBL in mid-2001 and had been a bright star of the team.

After the 2009 CPBL season Chen had been under investigation for game-fixing allegations. Although Chen denied any wrongdoings, the Banqiao District Prosecutors' Office still indicted him for gambling and fraud on February 10, 2010. Chen was immediately expelled as a result, ending his professional baseball career.

Since December 2010, Chen runs a barbecue restaurant in Hualien City along with his former Brother Elephants teammate Chin-hui Tsao who was also expelled by CPBL due to game-fixing allegation. In June 2011, the Banciao District Court sentenced Chen to 30 months imprisonment for game-fixing. An appeal heard by the Taiwan High Court in 2014 reduced his prison sentence to four to six months, or a fine of NT$162,000.

Chen married local starlet Lin Hsiu-Chin (林秀琴) in 2005 and they had a daughter.

== Career statistics ==
- Bold font indicates leading in CPBL

	Season	G	AB	R	H	2B	3B	HR	TB	RBI	SB	BB	SO	AVG
2001	30	120	25	45	11	3	6	80	30	3	9	23	.375	
2002	84	308	65	89	18	4	15	160	57	2	43	58	.289	
2003	**100**	**401**	**84**	**137**	20	6	18	223	**97**	31	37	57	.342	
2004	**100**	**393**	66	113	18	7	12	181	54	20	39	78	.288	
2005	60	224	39	68	14	1	1	87	18	7	25	34	.304	
2006	96	360	49	91	20	1	12	149	49	11	39	70	.253	
2007	30	111	20	41	11	1	4	66	27	0	5	18	.369	
2008	81	334	71	101	19	3	11	159	50	17	36	36	.302	
2009	32	133	20	37	6	2	4	59	18	4	4	21	.278	
**Total**	613	2675	440	722	137	28	83	1164	400	125	237	395	.303	

== Awards ==
- 6-time CPBL All-star Game (2002–2006, 2008)
- CPBL Rookie of the Year (2001)
- CPBL RBI Champion Award (2003)
- CPBL Hits Champion Award (2003)
- 3-time CPBL Golden Glove Award (outfielder) (2002–2004)
- 3-time CPBL Best Ten Player Award (outfielder) (2002–2004)

== Salary ==
Year	Team	NT/month
2001	Brother Elephants	120,000
2002	Brother Elephants	125,000
2003	Brother Elephants	160,000
2004	Brother Elephants	220,000
2005	Brother Elephants	280,000
2006	Brother Elephants	270,000
2007	Brother Elephants	230,000
2008	Brother Elephants	210,000
2009	Brother Elephants	240,000
2010	Brother Elephants	200,000

== See also ==
- Chinese Professional Baseball League
- Brother Elephants

Awards
Preceded by Feng Sheng-hsien (馮勝賢)	CPBL Rookie of the Year Award; 2001	Succeeded by Tsai Chung-nan (蔡仲南)
Preceded by Tsai Feng-ang (蔡豐安)	CPBL RBI Champion Award; 2003	Succeeded by Chang Tai-shan (張泰山)
Preceded by Huang Chung-yi (黃忠義)	CPBL Hit Champion Award; 2003	Succeeded by Peng Cheng-min (彭政閔)
