= Chen Kuan-jen =

Taiwanese baseball player

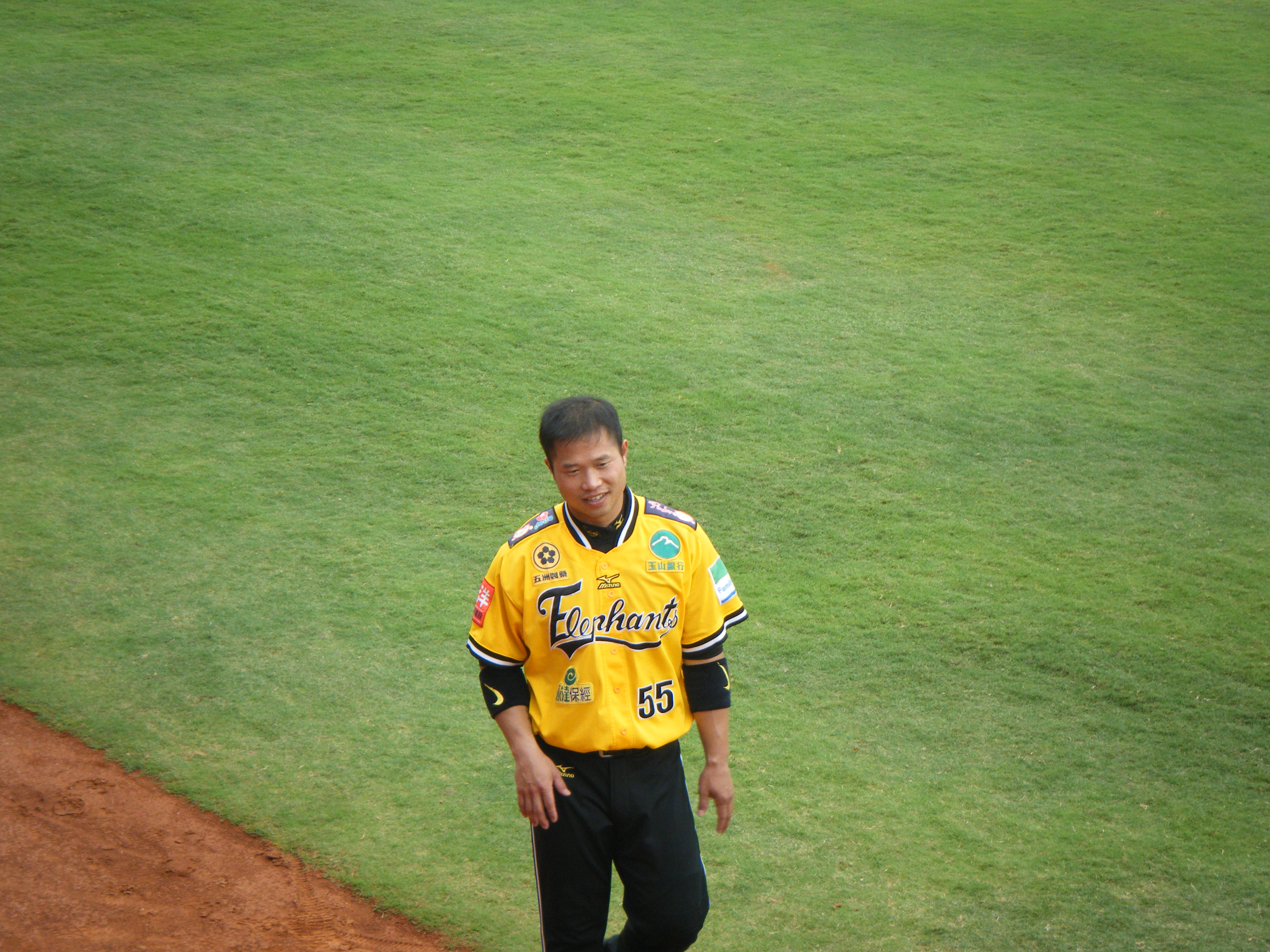
- Right Fielder
- Born: 15 April 1982 (age 44); Taiwan
- Bats: Left Throws: Left

Chinese Professional Baseball League debut
- March 21, 2006, for the Brother Elephants

Career statistics (through 2008)
- Batting average: .351
- Home runs: 16
- Runs batted in: 173
- Stats at Baseball Reference

Teams
- Brother Elephants (2006–2014)

Career highlights and awards
- CPBL Rookie of the Year (2006)

Chen Kuan-jen (Chinese: 陳冠任; pinyin: Chén Guānrèn; born 15 April 1982) is a Taiwanese former professional baseball player.

== Career ==
In 2006 season, as a rookie, he gained the Batting Championship Award and Chinese Professional Baseball League Rookie of the Year. He played for the Brother Elephants (now the Chinatrust Brothers) of the Chinese Professional Baseball League, as well as the Lamigo Monkeys.

In 2016, he played for the Southern Maryland Blue Crabs of the Atlantic League of Professional Baseball.

In late 2017, he signed on as a mid-season addition for the Adelaide Bite of the Australian Baseball League.

== Career statistics ==
Season	Team	G	AB	H	HR	RBI	SB	BB	SO	TB	DP	AVG
2006	Brother Elephants	88	318	111	10	54	0	25	36	164	9	0.349
2007	Brother Elephants	71	268	96	5	42	0	23	21	125	9	0.358
2008	Brother Elephants	98	400	139	1	77	4	35	27	169	14	0.348
Total	3year	257	986	346	16	173	4	83	84	458	32	0.351

== Awards ==
- Chinese Professional Baseball League Home run Derby Winner (2005)
- Chinese Professional Baseball League Rookie of the Year Award (2006)
- Chinese Professional Baseball League Batting Champion Award (2006)
- Chinese Professional Baseball League Hits Champion Award (2008)

== See also ==
- Chinese Professional Baseball League
- Brother Elephants

Awards
Preceded by Peng Cheng-min (彭政閔)	Chinese Professional Baseball League Home Run Derby Winner; 2005	Succeeded by Huang Gueh-yu (黃貴裕)
Preceded by Lin En-Yu (林恩宇)	Chinese Professional Baseball League Rookie of the Year Award; 2006	Succeeded by Pan Wu-hsiung (潘武雄)
Preceded by Peng Cheng-min (彭政閔)	Chinese Professional Baseball League Batting Champion Award; 2006	Succeeded by Chen Chin-Feng (陳金鋒)
Preceded by Kao Kuo-ching (高國慶)	Chinese Professional Baseball League Hit Champion Award; 2008	Succeeded by Wilton Veras (威納斯W.V)
