= Peng Cheng-min =

Taiwanese baseball player and coach

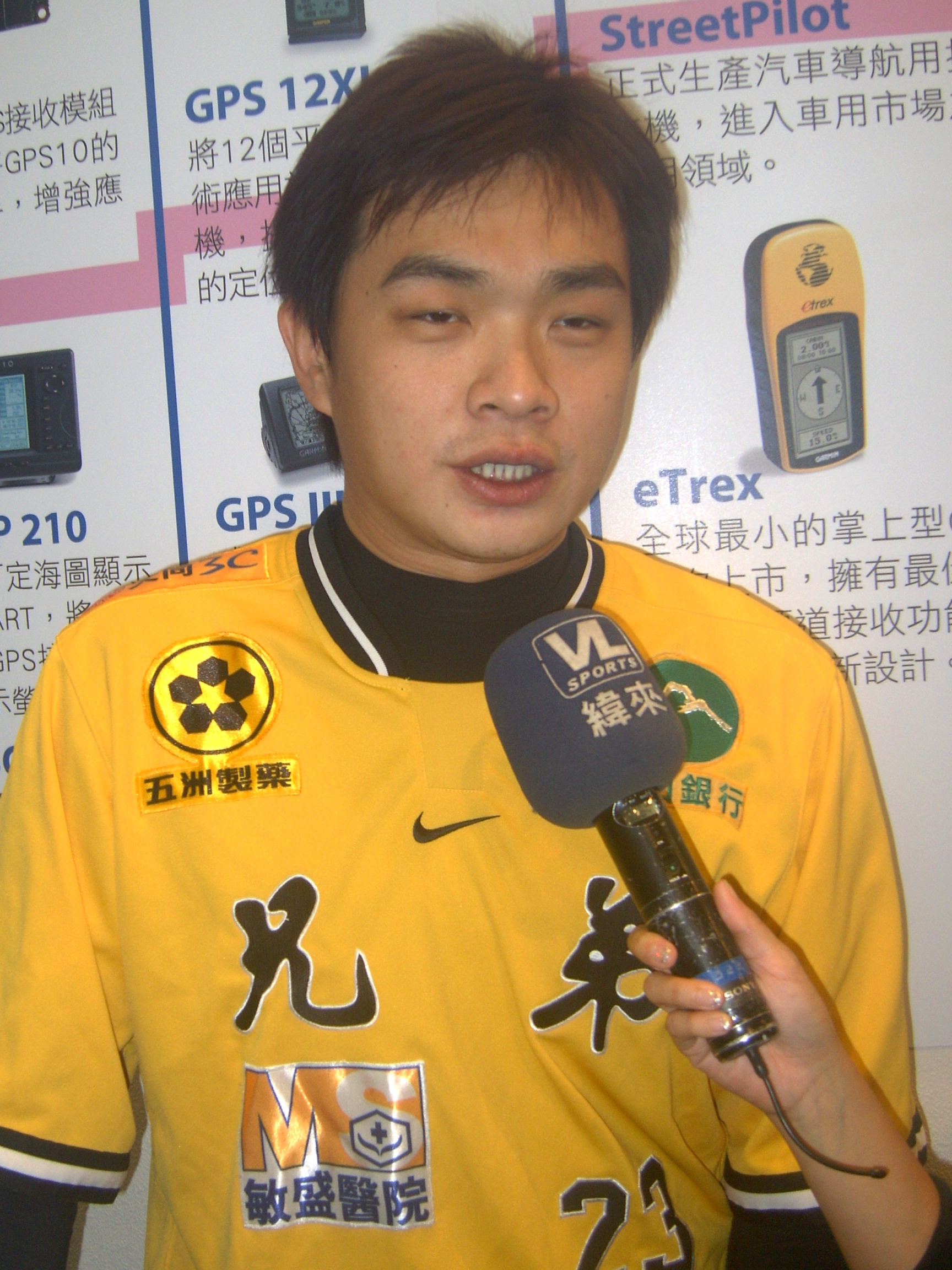

CTBC Brothers – No. 86
- Right fielder/First baseman / Manager
- Born: 6 August 1978 (age 47); Kaoshiung, Taiwan
- Batted: Right Threw: Right

CPBL debut
- 10 March, 2001, for the Brother Elephants

Last appearance
- 5 October, 2019, for the Chinatrust Brothers

Career statistics
- Batting average: .333
- Hits: 2044
- Home runs: 192
- Runs batted in: 1096
- Stolen Base: 231
- Stats at Baseball Reference

Teams
- As player: Brother Elephants/Chinatrust Brothers (2001–2019); As coach: Chinatrust Brothers/CTBC Brothers (2020–2023)

Career highlights and awards
- CPBL MVP of the Year (2010)

Peng Cheng-min, (traditional Chinese: 彭政閔; simplified Chinese: 彭政闵; pinyin: Péng Zhēngmǐn; Wade–Giles: Peng^{2} Cheng^{1} Min^{3}; born 6 August 1978 in Kaoshiung, Taiwan), is a Taiwanese former professional baseball player and baseball coach who was a right fielder, first baseman, and designated hitter for the CTBC Brothers of the Chinese Professional Baseball League from 2001 to 2019.

== Playing career ==
During the 2001–02 seasons he was designated hitter for the team, as he was picked 1st overall in the 2001 draft. Starting in 2003, he began his four-season tenure in right field after adjusting to the role. However, in the middle of the 2006 season Brother Elephants released then first baseman Tsai Feng-an (蔡豐安) and Peng switched to play first base, late in his career, he also played as an occasional designated hitter. He also wore number 23 because his original number 6 jersey was worn by Tsai when he first entered the team, but he never reverted to the number, as there had been no notable players who wore number 23 in baseball.

He is known for his skill hitting inside-out, so he always lands the ball on the right side of the field, that falsely listed him as an opposite-field hitter. He has won five CPBL Batting Championship Awards and holds the Chinese Professional Baseball League records for career Singles(1515), walks (1126), and runs scored (1090). he was the pivotal and the only member of both generations of Three Slugging Muketeers.

However, in 2005, he had an incident similar to David Ortiz, where he hit a power box out of frustration. That caused him to inflict multiple fractures on his wrist. He missed the 2005 calendar year, and the top half of 2006 season. The break included all of the international fixtures, including Intercontinental Cup 2006.

In 2008, he hit .391, a CPBL single-season record.(Then it was broken by Wang Po-jung with .414 in 2016) On 20 September 2008, Peng hit the 1000th home run in Elephant's history, and followed it up on 28 March 2009 with the CPBL's 6000th home run. He recorded his career 1,000 hits on 18 August 2010 in Taichung Baseball Field, becoming the player reached the 1,000 hits with fewest games(844), plates (3469), at bats (2838).

In the end of 2010, when the Brother Elephants seized the championship, he gained the CPBL MVP of the Year Award, adding to the one earned in 2001, and also adding to his three consecutive titles.

On 21 November 2011, Peng signed a ten-year extension with the Brother Elephants, five-year as player and five-year as coach. The contract worth 66 million NT dollar (roughly 2.27 million US dollar), it is the largest contract for a player in CPBL history.

Since 2012, however, he was no longer a regular starter. After becoming the 4th player in CPBL history to reach 1000 hits, 100 home runs and 100 steals landmark, it wasn't until 4 May 2014, where he made his 200th stolen base, and made hit 2000th base hit on 7 July 2019. 10 days later, he became the highest ever run scorer, 1076 runs scored.

In January 2019, Peng announced his retirement from baseball, and played his final match on 29 September as a testimonial match, with his jersey number likely to be retired at the conclusion of the match. During the final week, all team members wore the jersey with 'Chia, 23' on their back. His actual final match was in the Final when the team lost 3-20, which incidentally adds to 23, his shirt number.

== Coaching career ==
Peng became an assistant batting coach for Chinese Taipei National Team in October, 2019.

On 10 May 2023, Peng was named the 7th manager in CTBC Brothers history, replacing Lin Wei-chu, who stepped down from the position. However, on 29 December, Peng himself stepped down from the position due to health concerns.

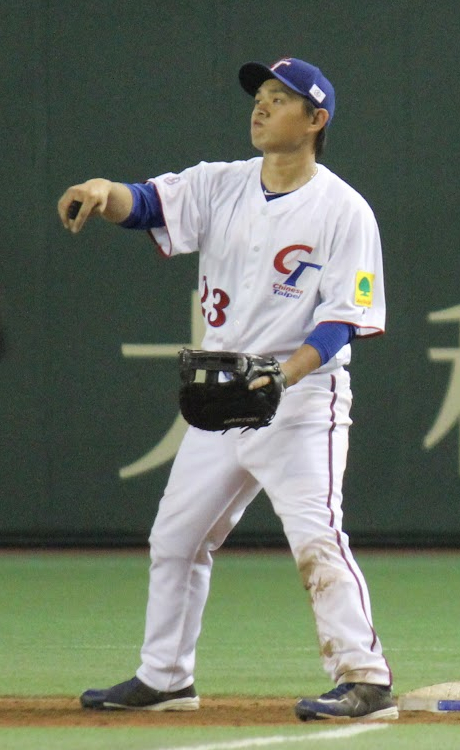
Peng at the 2013 World Baseball Classic

== Personal life ==
Chia Chia (恰恰) is Peng's nickname as he shares the surname and bears resemblance to Peng Chia-chia, a veteran Taiwanese entertainer and baseball fanatic.

== Experience ==
- Kaoshiung City Municipal Fu-sing Elememtary School Baseball Team
- Kaoshiung City Municipal Wu-fu Junior High School Baseball Team
- Pintong Mei-he High School Baseball Team, trained as second baseman and third baseman, but excelled as a shortstop.
- Taiwan Cooperative Bank baseball team
- Taiwan Army Baseball Team, as a positional pitcher, armed with a 144 km/h fastball
- CPBL Brother Elephants/Chinatrust Brother Elephants (2001~2019),
  - 4-time CPBL champion, 2001–2003, 2010 playoffs MVP, 2001, 2010, Golden Hammer Team, 2002, 2010 Regular Season League MVP
  - Franchise-matching 7-time runner-up (2014–2017, 2019)
  - Oldest ever league finals LMVP (losing team, 2016)
  - First ever player winning 5-time Batting Average Titles, 2003–2005, 2008, 2010 with .376 in 2004, a CPBL record for Taiwanese-born local players. Eclipsed by himself in 2008 (.391).
- Chinese Taipei National Baseball Team (2001–2013)

== Career statistics ==
Season	G	AB	R	H	2B	3B	HR	TB	RBI	SB	WALK	SO	SLG	OBP	AVG
2001	59	136	20	43	5	1	5	65	19	5	28	33	.478	.433	.316
2002	88	277	66	86	17	3	18	163	71	16	72	82	.588	.445	.310
2003	100	369	83	131	25	3	18	216	83	22	70	81	.585	.455	.355
2004	99	338	90	127	14	3	18	201	66	26	82	64	.595	.493	.376
2005	76	274	57	93	8	3	14	149	47	13	53	49	.544	.445	.339
2006	48	154	25	54	10	0	6	82	22	4	35	39	.532	.468	.351
2007	97	345	80	125	17	0	21	205	64	12	60	67	.594	.452	.362
2008	81	284	50	111	17	0	8	152	60	23	54	50	.535	.482	.391
2009	108	361	85	132	19	0	17	202	71	25	82	62	.560	.481	.366
2010	117	387	59	138	21	1	8	186	65	20	72	58	.482	.451	.356
2011	80	277	37	87	18	0	4	117	55	6	48	45	.422	.405	.314
2012	119	440	78	141	28	0	14	211	88	7	76	66	.480	.416	.320
2013	116	403	60	128	25	0	10	183	74	15	72	63	.454	.419	.318
2014	118	399	57	120	15	1	9	164	56	18	82	69	.411	.415	.301
2015	108	409	62	131	16	1	4	161	57	3	69	81	.394	.414	.320
2016	105	343	58	117	19	0	8	160	67	4	51	47	.466	.417	.341
2017	81	298	43	89	12	0	2	107	38	6	45	51	.359	.385	.299
2018	108	358	51	104	14	2	6	140	59	5	41	52	.391	.357	.290
2019	92	288	29	87	18	0	2	111	34	1	29	40	.385	.367	.302
Total	1800	6140	1090	2044	319	18	192	2975	1096	231	1126	1099	.485	.425	.333

Red Number is CPBL record

=== Career Statistics Rank ===
Item	Amount	Brother Elephants Rank	CPBL history Rank
Games played	1800	1st	2nd
Plates Appearance	7370	1st	2nd
At Bats	6140	1st	2nd
Hits	2044	1st	2nd
Singles	1515	1st	1st
Doubles	319	1st	2nd
Triples	18	10th	T-31st
Home Runs	192	1st	4th
Total Bases	2975	1st	2nd
Runs Scored	1090	1st	1st
Runs Batted In	1096	1st	2nd
Ground into Double Plays	190	1st	3rd
Sacrifice Bunts	18	T-29th	T-144th
Sacrifice Flies	84	1st	1st
Bad Balls Gained	953	1st	1st
Intentionally Bad Balls	80	1st	1st
Walks	1126	1st	1st
Strike outs	1099	1st	2nd
Stolen Bases	231	1st	3rd
Caught Stealing	74	T-1st	3rd

== Awards ==
Awards	# of Awards	Years
CPBL All-star game	19	2001–2019
CPBL All-star game Highest vote-recipient	15	2005-2019
CPBL MVP of the month of hitter	7	
CPBL MVP of Year	1	2010
CPBL Batting Champion Award	5	2003–05, 2008, 2010
CPBL Best Ten Player Award(Outfielder)	3	2003–05
CPBL Best Ten Player Award (First baseman)	2	2008, 2010
Best Golden Glove Award (First baseman)	3	2008, 2010, 2013
Taiwan Series Outstanding Player Award	3	2001, 2003, 2016
CPBL Most Valuable Player of Year	1	2010
CPBL Hits Champion Award	1	2004
CPBL Best Ten Player Award (Designated hitter)	1	2002
CPBL Home Run Derby winner	1	2004

== Salary ==
Year	Club	NT/month	Converse to US/annual
2001	Brother Elephants	95,000	37,600
2002	Brother Elephants	100,000	39,600
2003	Brother Elephants	127,000	50,200
2004	Brother Elephants	200,000	79,200
2005	Brother Elephants	300,000	118,800
2006	Brother Elephants	310,000	122,800
2007	Brother Elephants	240,000	95,000
2008	Brother Elephants	320,000	126,700
2009	Brother Elephants	400,000	158,400
2010	Brother Elephants	500,000	198,000
2011	Brother Elephants	525,000	207,900
2012	Brother Elephants	550,000	217,800
2013	Brother Elephants	550,000	217,800
2014	Chinatrust Brothers	550,000	217,800
2015	Chinatrust Brothers	550,000	217,800
2016	Chinatrust Brothers	550,000	217,800
2016	Chinatrust Brothers	700,000	277,200
2017	Chinatrust Brothers	700,000	277,200
2018	Chinatrust Brothers	700,000	277,200
2019	Chinatrust Brothers	700,000	277,200

*1 NT dollar is roughly equal to 0.033 US dollar.

== National team ==
He has been selected by Chinese Taipei baseball team several times since 1998, as follows:

- 1998 Baseball World Cup
- 2000 Haarlem Baseball Week
- 2002 Busan Asian Games
- 2002 Intercontinental Cup
- 2003 Asian Baseball Championship
- 2004 Athens Olympic Games
- 2007 Baseball World Cup
- 2007 Asian Baseball Championship
- 2008 Summer Olympics – Qualification
- 2008 Beijing Olympic Games
- 2009 World Baseball Classic
- 2010 Guangzhou Asian Games
- 2013 World Baseball Classic - Qualification
- 2013 World Baseball Classic

=== International game performance ===
- On 2 March 2013, Peng played for Chinese Taipei national baseball team against Australia in Taichung Intercontinental Baseball Stadium during 2013 World Baseball Classic. In the first inning, he drove Dai-Kang Yang for first run of the tournament; besides, in the fifth inning, he smashed a right-field solo home run, it was first home run of the tournament.

== Family ==
Peng's parents live in Kaoshiung; in addition, he has two elder sisters and a younger brother, Peng Cheng-sin(彭政欣), who currently is a Chinatrust Brothers administrator. On 13 December 2008, he married Lu Kuan-chi(呂冠綺), a flight attendant. Then, they gave birth to twins, a boy and a girl.

Awards
Preceded by Chen Chien-wei(陳健偉); Chen Chin-Feng(陳金鋒); Pan Wu-hsiung(潘武雄)	CPBL Batting Champion Award; 2003–05; 2008; 2010	Succeeded by Chen Kuan-jen(陳冠任); Pan Wu-hsiung(潘武雄); Chang Cheng-wei(張正偉)
Preceded by Chen Chih-yuan(陳致遠)	CPBL Hit Champion Award; 2004	Succeeded by Yang Sen(陽森)
Preceded by Lin Yi-chuan(林益全)	CPBL MVP of the Year Award; 2010	Succeeded by Lin Hung-yu(林泓育)
