= Shih Chih-wei =

Taiwanese baseball player

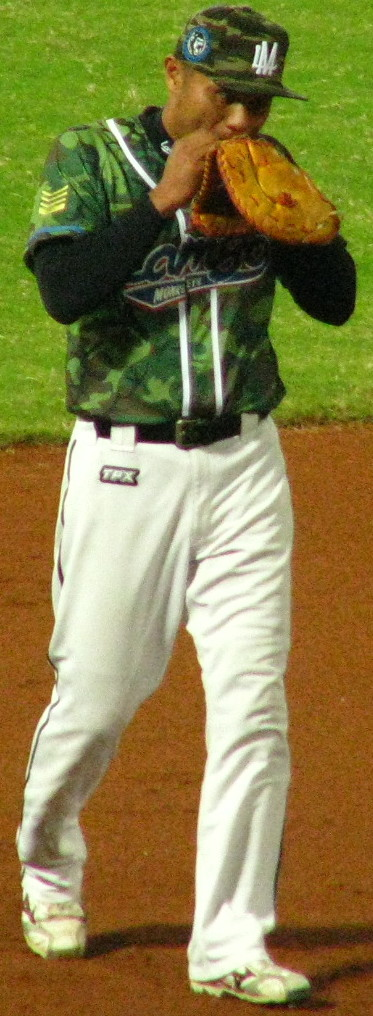

CTBC Brothers – No. 36
- Infielder / Batting coach
- Born: 14 August 1977 (age 48); Alishan, Chiayi County, Taiwan
- Bats: Right Throws: Right

debut
- March 4, 2004, for the La New Bears

Career statistics (through 2014 season)
- Batting average: .285
- Hits: 876
- Home run: 7
- Runs batted in: 319
- Stats at Baseball Reference

Teams
- La New Bears (2004–2010); Lamigo Monkeys (2011–2014)

Career highlights and awards
- CPBL Rookie of the Year (2004); CPBL Golden Glove Award (2004); CPBL Golden Glove Award (2006)
Medals
Men's Baseball
Representing Chinese Taipei
Asian Games
Gold medal – first place	2006 Doha	Team competition

Shih Chih-wei (Chinese: 石志偉; pinyin: Shí Zhìwěi; Wade–Giles: Shih^{2} Chih^{4}-wei^{3}; born 14 August 1977 in Alishan, Chiayi County, Taiwan) is a retired Taiwanese professional baseball player. He played for the amateur Taiwan Cooperative Bank baseball team before being drafted by the La New Bears (later renamed the Lamigo Monkeys) of Taiwan's Chinese Professional Baseball League (CPBL) in 2004.

== Early life ==
Shih Chih-wei was born to an aboriginal family of Tsou tribal ancestry. He has been playing baseball since elementary school and graduated from the Taipei Physical Education College.

A member of the Taiwan Cooperative Bank baseball team, Shih was chosen to play in the 2003 World Port Tournament as a member of the national team.

== Professional career ==
Shih was drafted by professional team La New Bears in 2004. In his professional debut, he got his first career base hit against the Brother Elephants. He hit his first career home run in Chengcing Lake Baseball Field; it was an inside-the-park home run.

He became the first player from the team to receive a monthly Most Valuable Player award. Though a rookie, Shih was selected to play in the 2004 CPBL All-Star Game as starting third baseman.

Along with teammate Lin Chih-sheng, the two are often referred to as the "Sheng-Shih Connection", which is derived from glove puppet film Legend of the Sacred Stone (Wade–Giles: Shèng-shíh Ch'uán-shuō). The two players played in the CPBL Future All-Star Game, which is a game with professional rookies playing against amateurs, and had a combined 7-for-8 performance. As a result of his performance in 2004, he received the CPBL Rookie of the Year Award, becoming the first player of the Bears to receive this honor. Shih was also given the CPBL Golden Glove Award at second base.

In 2006, Shih got the Golden Glove Award at third base. He was the first player of the Bears to receive the award twice.

== International career ==
Shih has played in several international events such as the 1994 and 1995 World Junior Baseball Championships, in which Chinese Taipei earned a bronze and a silver medal. He also played in the 2003 World Port Tournament and 2003 Baseball World Cup as an amateur.

After becoming a professional, Shih participated in the 2006 Asia Series as a member of the La New Bears, who won the Taiwan Series that year. The team lost to the Hokkaido Nippon-Ham Fighters in the championship round, earning the position of second place. He also played in the 2006 Asian Games as a member of the national team, which won first place in the tournament.

== Career statistics ==
Season	Team	G	AB	H	HR	RBI	SB	BB	SO	TB	GDP	BA
2004	La New Bears	100	409	117	1	45	13	14	49	148	11	.286
2005	La New Bears	98	391	102	0	31	8	14	48	117	6	.261
2006	La New Bears	100	410	128	0	46	10	25	40	152	9	.312
2007	La New Bears	100	399	105	2	36	7	24	33	128	8	.263
2008	La New Bears	99	397	132	0	46	2	24	34	161	14	.332
2009	La New Bears	108	365	100	3	33	3	31	42	123	11	.274
2010	La New Bears	42	109	27	0	10	0	14	13	31	2	.248
2011	Lamigo Monkeys	86	290	77	0	39	1	22	42	92	5	.266
2012	Lamigo Monkeys	85	244	71	1	29	1	15	30	84	6	.291
2013	Lamigo Monkeys	31	36	11	0	4	0	3	3	13	2	.306
2014	Lamigo Monkeys	16	28	6	0	0	0	0	5	7	2	.214
Career total		865	3078	876	7	319	45	186	339	1056	76	.285

Awards
Preceded by Pan Wei-lun	CPBL Rookie of the Year Award; 2004	Succeeded by Lin En-yu
