= Kao Kuo-ching =

Taiwanese baseball player

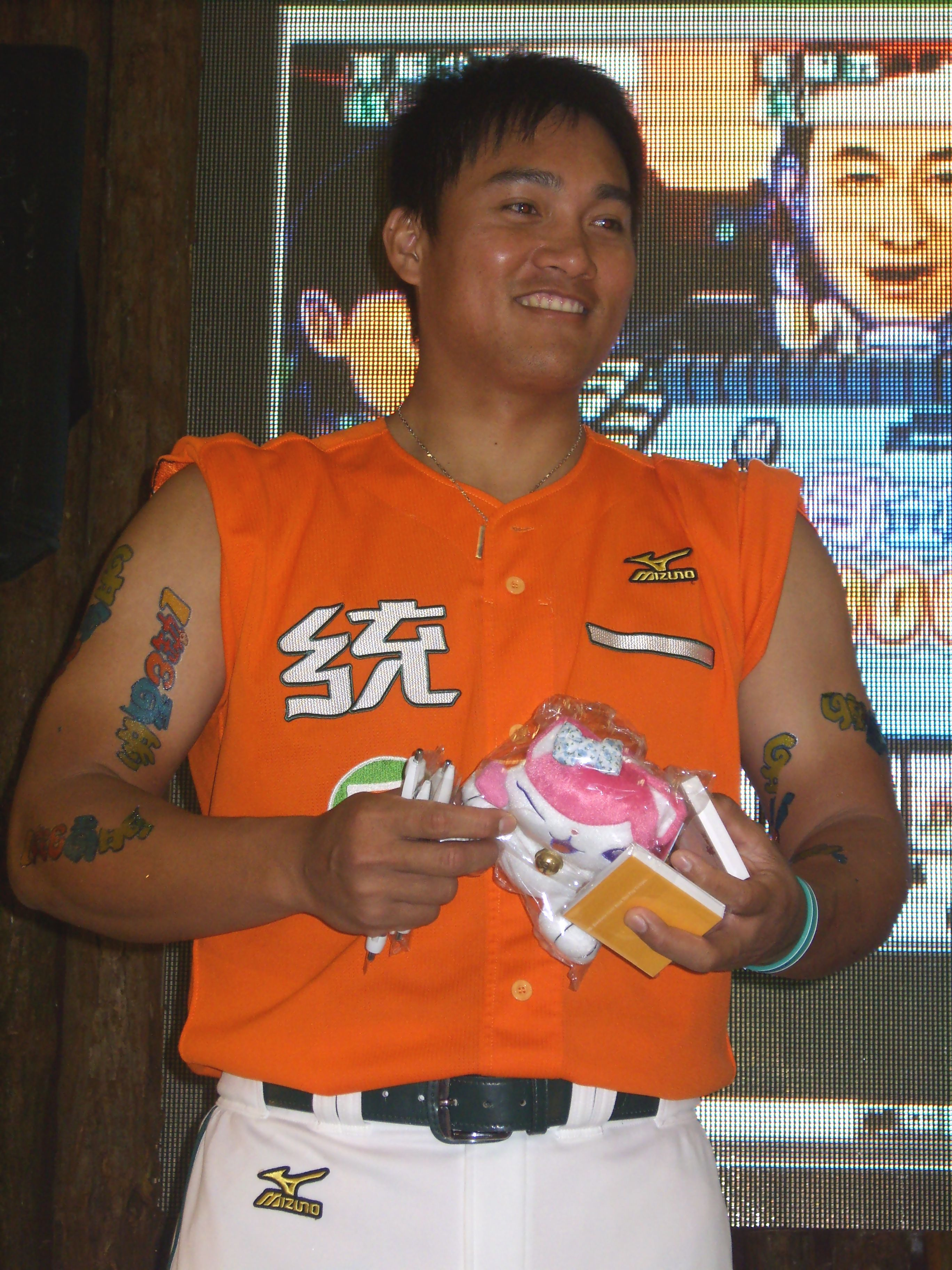

Uni-President Lions – No. 68
- First baseman / Coach
- Born: 6 October 1978 (age 47)
- Batted: Right Threw: Right

CPBL debut
- March 3, 2004, for the Uni-President Lions

Last CPBL appearance
- May 26, 2024, for the Uni-President Lions

Career statistics
- Batting average: .300
- Home runs: 134
- RBI: 903
- Stats at Baseball Reference

Teams
- Uni-President Lions (2004–2024)

Career highlights and awards
- CPBL MVP of the Year (2007); 5x Taiwan Series champion (2008-2009, 2011, 2013, 2020); Taiwan Series MVP (2013)

Kao Kuo-ching (Chinese: 高國慶; pinyin: Gāo Guóqìng; Wade–Giles: Kao^{1} Kuo^{2} Ching^{4}; born 6 October 1978) is a Taiwanese former professional baseball first baseman. He played in the Chinese Professional Baseball League (CPBL) for the Uni-President Lions from 2004 to 2024. He served as the Lions' captain beginning in 2007. He has also played for the Taiwan national baseball team in 2008 Final Olympic Qualifying Tournament.

== Career ==
Kao refused to sign a long-term contract with Uni-President Lions in 2012, having the confidence that he would perform better the next season. Before 2013 season, he claimed that he did not regret about not signing a long-term with Uni-President Lions the previous year.

Kao did not play for the Lions in 2023, and was non-tendered by the team on November 30, 2023.

On May 27, 2024, Kao announced his retirement from professional baseball, and ended his career by playing in one final game for Lions, in which he went 0-for-4 with one RBI and three strikeouts.

== Career statistics ==
year	team	games	AB	H	HR	RBI	SB	BB	SO	TB	GDP	BA
2004	Uni-President Lions	99	301	72	12	34	10	37	68	128	15	.239
2005	Uni-President Lions	99	358	112	5	52	2	30	63	153	17	.313
2006	Uni-President Lions	82	291	82	3	26	2	19	38	111	11	.282
2007	Uni-President Lions	100	425	152	20	89	0	30	51	238	20	.358
2008	Uni-President Lions	96	395	131	7	74	0	32	49	184	10	.332
2009	Uni-President Lions	70	277	98	5	47	0	23	37	131	13	.354
2010	Uni-President Lions	106	408	111	3	47	1	48	63	142	14	.272
2011	Uni-President Lions	120	472	157	22	84	2	53	64	260	14	.333
2012	Uni-President Lions	114	432	115	13	82	1	52	67	183	16	.266
2013	Uni-President Lions	112	418	123	6	46	3	24	64	160	15	.294
2014	Uni-President Lions	107	340	89	2	32	1	26	49	112	15	.262
2015	Uni-President Lions	91	346	113	5	57	6	27	44	148	12	.327
2016	Uni-President Lions	111	437	132	11	74	1	38	74	183	18	.302
2017	Uni-President Lions	102	323	95	6	34	1	24	62	130	11	.294
2018	Uni-President Lions	98	274	89	6	46	2	14	33	121	8	.325
2019	Uni-President Lions	100	242	65	5	27	0	16	38	89	12	.269
TOTAL	16 years	1607	5739	1736	131	851	32	437	864	2473	221	.302

== See also ==
- Chinese Professional Baseball League
- Uni-President Lions

Awards
Preceded by Lin En-yu(林恩宇)	CPBL MVP of the Year Award; 2007	Succeeded by Mike Johnson
Preceded by Chang Tai-shan(張泰山)	CPBL Hit Champion Award; 2007	Succeeded by Chen Kuan-jen(陳冠任)
