= Lin Chih-sheng (baseball) =

Taiwanese baseball player (born 1982)

Ngayaw Ake'
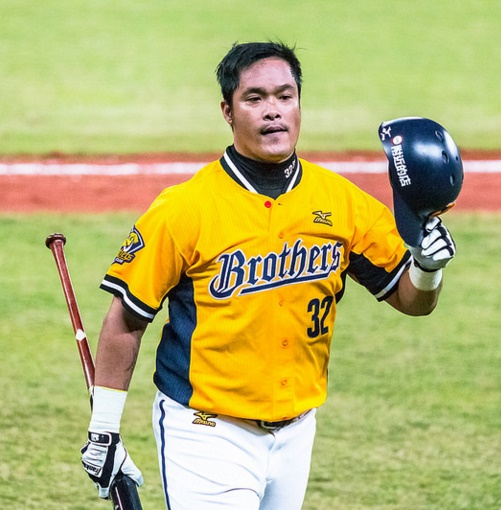
- Infielder
- Born: 1 January 1982 (age 44); Taitung County, Taiwan
- Batted: Right Threw: Right

CPBL debut
- 3 June, 2004, for the La New Bears

Last CPBL appearance
- 7 September, 2025, for the Wei Chuan Dragons

CPBL statistics
- Batting average: .308
- Hits: 1,860
- Home runs: 305
- Runs batted in: 1,237
- Stats at Baseball Reference

Teams
- La New Bears / Lamigo Monkeys (2004–2015); Chinatrust Brothers / CTBC Brothers (2016–2021); Wei Chuan Dragons (2022–2025)

Career highlights and awards
- CPBL Best Ten Award (2006–2009, 2015); CPBL Gold Glove (2007); 6× Taiwan Series champion (2006, 2012, 2014–2015, 2021, 2023); Taiwan Series MVP (2012, 2015); CPBL MVP of the Year (2015)
Medals
Men's baseball
Representing Chinese Taipei
Asian Games
| Gold medal – first place | 2006 Doha | Team |
| Silver medal – second place | 2010 Guangzhou | Team |
Asian Baseball Championship
| Gold medal – first place | 2001 Taipei | Team |
| Bronze medal – third place | 2007 Taichung | Team |
World Youth Baseball Championship
| Silver medal – second place | 1998 Fairview Heights | Team |

Lin Chih-sheng (Chinese: 林智勝; pinyin: Lín Zhì Shèng; Wade–Giles: Lin^{2} Chih^{4} Sheng^{4}; born 1 January 1982), also known as Ngayaw Ake' in Amis language, is a Taiwanese former professional baseball infielder. He played in the Chinese Professional Baseball League (CPBL) for the La New Bears / Lamigo Monkeys, Chinatrust Brothers / CTBC Brothers, and Wei Chuan Dragons. He began his career with the Bears in 2004. The team changed its name to the Lamigo Monkeys in 2011, and Lin left after the 2015 season to sign with the Brothers.

While with the Bears and later Monkeys, Lin and his teammate Shih Chih-wei were often referred to as the "Sheng-Shih Connection," a reference to the glove puppet film Legend of the Sacred Stone. Alone, Lin is nicknamed "Big Brother." He joined the Wei Chuan Dragons in 2022 and retired at the end of the 2025 season.

== Career ==
Lin competed at the 2006 Asian Games and had the game-winning hit at the championship game against Japan. In 2008, Lin was chosen to play on the Taiwanese national baseball team at the 2008 Olympic Games. He also played in the 2010 Asian Games, and captained the national team in the inaugural WBSC Premier12 held in November 2015.

He recorded the CPBL's first 30–30 season in 2015, and also won the MVP award that season. On 4 January 2016, Lin signed with the Chinatrust Brothers. He is the first player to change teams since the implementation of free agency in 2010. The three-year deal, worth a guaranteed NT$45 million (US$1.36 million), is the richest in CPBL history, and also includes NT$9 million in incentives.

On 3 April 2022, while playing for the Wei Chuan Dragons, Lin hit his 290th career home run off of Uni-President Lions pitcher Ching-Ming Wang. With the solo blast, Lin set the all-time CPBL home run record. He played in 103 games for Wei Chuan in 2022, batting .300/.392/.432 with 10 home runs and 62 RBI.

On 16 April 2023, Lin hit his 300th career home run off of Bradin Hagens of the Rakuten Monkeys. In doing so, he became the first player in CPBL history to reach the 300 home run mark. In February 2025, Lin announced that he would retire at the end of the season. Lin hit the 305th home run of his career in his final game on 7 September 2025. Over the course of his career, Lin tied the record with six Taiwan Series championship wins, and set a CBPL postseason home run record with fourteen.

Awards
| Preceded by Tilson Brito; Lin Hung-yu | CPBL Home Run Champion Award; 2009,2010; 2012 | Succeeded by Lin Hung-yu; Lin Yi-chuan |
| Preceded by Lin Yi-chuan | CPBL RBI Champion Award; 2010 | Succeeded by Lin Hung-yu |
| Preceded by Lin Yi-chuan | CPBL MVP of the Year Award; 2015 | Succeeded by Wang Po-jung |
