= Ching-Ming Wang =

Taiwanese baseball player (born 1986)

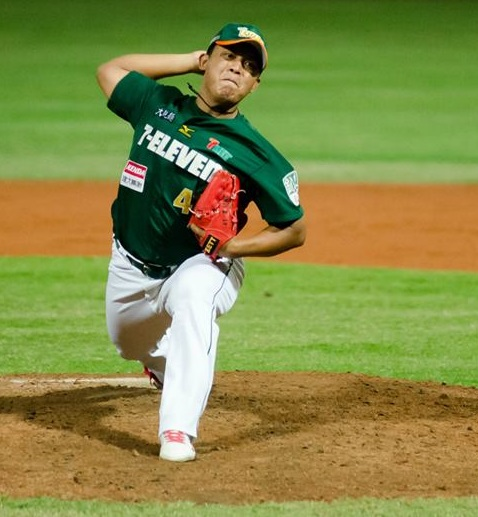

Uni-President Lions – No. 41
- Pitcher
- Born: January 16, 1986 (age 40); Taitung County, Taiwan
- Bats: Right Throws: Right

CPBL debut
- March 24, 2010, for the Uni-President Lions

CPBL statistics (through 2025 season)
- Win–loss record: 57–52
- Earned run average: 4.48
- Strikeouts: 658
- Stats at Baseball Reference

Teams
- Uni-President Lions (2010–present)

Career highlights and awards
- 3x Taiwan Series champion (2011, 2013, 2020); Taiwan Series MVP (2011); CPBL Rookie of the Year (2010)

Ching-Ming Wang (Mandarin Chinese: 王鏡銘; born January 16, 1986) is a Taiwanese professional baseball pitcher for the Uni-President Lions of the Chinese Professional Baseball League (CPBL).

== Career ==
=== Uni-President Lions ===
On December 31, 2008, the Uni-President Lions drafted Wang in the 1st round of the 2008 CPBL Draft with a signing bonus of 2.5 million NTD and a monthly salary of 100,000 NTD.

Wang made his professional debut with the Lions in March 24, 2010, allowing one run in six innings against the Brother Elephants, which was also his first win of his career. He finished the 2010 season with a 10-3 record and had a 3.83 ERA, tying for sixth in the league in wins. He won the 2010 CPBL Rookie of the Year Award.

In 2011, he went 10–6 with a save and a 3.90 ERA across 44 games. He tied for fourth in wins, behind three foreign players (Orlando Roman, Dan Reichert and Ken Ray); he was tied with Tyler Lumsden and Ta-Yuan Kuan. In the Game 5 of the 2011 Taiwan Series, he hit at 153 km/h (95 mph) against Lin Hung-yu, which set a record for a Taiwanese native in a Taiwan Series. He won Games 2, 4, and 5 to give the Lions the title; no reliever had ever won 3 games in a Taiwan Series before. Wang also pitched in every game of the series beside Game 1, pitching a total of 9.1 innings and striking out 9 batters across 4 games. He was named Taiwan Series MVP.

In 2012, Wang had a win-loss record of 7-2 with 15 holds and 5 saves across 45 games, pitching to a ERA of 2.49. In 2013, Wang missed a portion of games during the 2013 season because of an injury, but still had a record of 9-3 with an ERA of 2.93 across 83 innings.

== International career ==
He was selected for Chinese Taipei national baseball team at the 2006 World University Baseball Championship, 2007 World Port Tournament, 2009 World Port Tournament, 2009 Asian Baseball Championship, 2009 Baseball World Cup, 2013 World Baseball Classic Qualification, 2013 World Baseball Classic, 2015 WBSC Premier12, 2016 exhibition games against Japan, and the 2017 World Baseball Classic.

In the 2007 World Port Tournament, he went 1–1 with a 3.46 ERA. During the 2009 World Port Tournament, he was 1–0 with a save and one run allowed in 8 innings. He tied Miguel A. González for fifth in the event in ERA.

Wang was selected for Chinese Taipei at the 2013 World Baseball Classic. He pitched in 3 games, and across 3.2 innings, did not allow a run. He also pitched in Chinese Taipei's final game of the tournament against Japan, where they lost in the 10th inning, 3-4.

Awards
Preceded by Lin Yi-chuan(林益全)	CPBL Rookie of the Year Award; 2010	Succeeded by Kuan Ta-yuan(官大元)
