= Chou Szu-chi =

Taiwanese baseball player (born 1981)

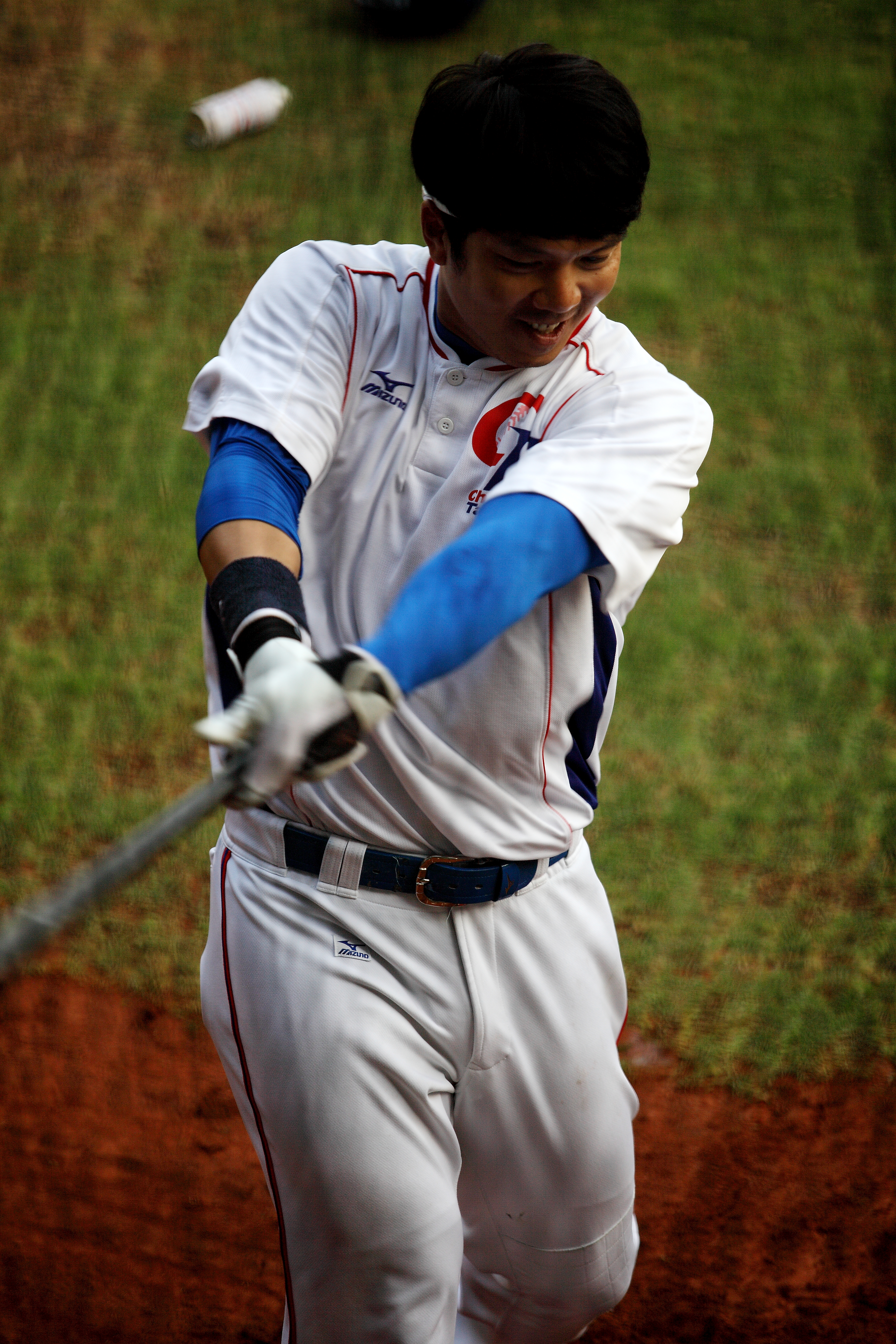
- Outfielder
- Born: October 26, 1981 (age 44); Hualien County, Taiwan
- Batted: Left Threw: Left

CPBL debut
- August 13, 2005, for the Macoto Cobras

Last CPBL appearance
- September 22, 2024, for the CTBC Brothers

Career statistics
- Batting average: .307
- Home runs: 144
- Runs batted in: 948
- Stolen Base: 100
- Runs: 867
- Stats at Baseball Reference

Teams
- Macoto Cobras / dmedia T-REX (2005–2008); Brother Elephants/Chinatrust Elephants/CTBC Brothers (2009–2024)

Career highlights and awards
- CPBL MVP of the Year (2012); 4× Taiwan Series champion (2010, 2021, 2022, 2024)

Chou Szu-chi (Chinese: 周思齊; born 26 October 1981) is a Taiwanese former professional baseball outfielder. He played 20 seasons in Taiwan's Chinese Professional Baseball League (CPBL) for the Macoto Cobras/dmedia T-REX and Brother Elephants/Chinatrust Elephants/CTBC Brothers.

== Career ==
At the end of 2008, when the dmedia T-REX folded in a gambling scandal, Chou was picked by the Brother Elephants in the third round of the redistribution draft.

His performance in the 2012 season earned him the 2012 CPBL MVP of the Year award. He was part of Chinese Taipei's 2013 World Baseball Classic roster. He batted .429/.692/.571 in the qualification and .200/.333/267 during the competition. During the second round match between Chinese Taipei and Japan, his base on ball in the 3rd inning helped Chinese Taipei score their first run. This, along with his combined 9 base on balls (during the qualification and the competition), earned him the nickname of "Asia's King of Plate discipline" (亞洲選球王).

Chou played his final CPBL game on 22 September 2024. In 20 seasons in the CPBL, he slashed .307/.375/.453 with 144 home runs, 948 RBI, and 100 stolen bases.

== Career statistics ==
Season	Team	G	AB	H	HR	RBI	SB	BB	SO	TB	DP	AVG
2005	Macoto Cobras	12	19	5	0	0	0	0	7	6	0	0.263
2006	Macoto Cobras	55	146	34	1	15	7	9	17	44	2	0.233
2007	Macoto Cobras	92	221	68	7	34	5	22	41	105	8	0.308
2008	dmedia T-REX	85	336	111	4	34	12	35	56	157	5	0.330
2009	Brother Elephants	96	354	110	5	49	3	42	55	152	6	0.311
2010	Brother Elephants	120	456	136	4	56	5	40	65	185	6	0.298
2011	Brother Elephants	120	447	135	7	88	5	47	77	205	5	0.302
2012	Brother Elephants	118	433	158	21	91	4	77	56	254	10	0.365
2013	Brother Elephants	105	399	126	8	54	6	36	57	180	12	0.316
2014	CTBC Brothers	102	332	92	4	42	6	39	56	121	4	0.277
2015	CTBC Brothers	109	413	144	15	79	11	45	68	218	7	0.349
2016	CTBC Brothers	114	409	140	17	103	6	65	56	227	11	0.342
2017	CTBC Brothers	107	387	117	8	52	9	51	38	158	12	0.302
2018	CTBC Brothers	110	394	120	11	64	2	34	60	178	6	0.305
2019	CTBC Brothers	83	190	49	6	33	3	16	28	78	5	0.258
2020	CTBC Brothers	106	355	115	22	81	6	36	66	209	4	0.324
2021	CTBC Brothers	69	193	44	2	22	2	16	32	60	4	0.228
2022	CTBC Brothers	53	149	35	1	31	3	10	19	52	4	0.235
Total	5 years	1656	5633	1739	143	928	95	620	854	2589	111	0.309

Awards
Preceded by Lin Hung-yu(林泓育)	CPBL MVP of the Year Award; 2012	Succeeded by Lin Yi-chuan(林益全)
