= CPBL Rookie of the Year Award =

The CPBL Rookie of the Year is awarded to the rookie who performs best in a particular Chinese Professional Baseball League season. The award has been given since 1993.

Rookies cannot have played in Nippon Professional Baseball, the International League, the Pacific Coast League, or Major League Baseball.

== List of winners ==
Year	Player	Chinese name	Team	Position
1993	Tseng Kuei-chang	曾貴章	China Times Eagles	Outfielder
1994	Lo Kuo-chang	羅國璋	Uni-President Lions	Shortstop
1995	Not Awarded			
1996	Chang Tai-shan	張泰山	Wei Chuan Dragons	Third baseman
1997	Chueh Chuang-chen	闕壯鎮	Koos Group Whales	Outfielder
1998	Tai Lung-shui	戴龍水	Mercuries Tigers	Pitcher
1999	Tsao Chun-yang	曹竣揚	Uni-President Lions	Pitcher
2000	Feng Sheng-hsien	馮勝賢	Brother Elephants	Shortstop
2001	Chen Chih-yuan	陳致遠	Brother Elephants	Outfielder
2002	Tsai Chung-nan	蔡仲南	Sinon Bulls	Pitcher
2003	Pan Wei-lun	潘威倫	Uni-President Lions	Pitcher
2004	Shih Chih-wei	石志偉	La New Bears	Second baseman
2005	Lin En-yu	林恩宇	Macoto Cobras	Pitcher
2006	Chen Kuan-jen	陳冠任	Brother Elephants	Outfielder
2007	Pan Wu-hsiung	潘武雄	Uni-President Lions	Outfielder
2008	Lin Chi-wei	林其緯	Sinon Bulls	Pitcher
2009	Lin Yi-chuan	林益全	Sinon Bulls	First baseman
2010	Wang Ching-ming	王鏡銘	Uni-President 7-Eleven Lions	Pitcher
2011	Kuan Ta-Yuan	官大元	Brother Elephants	Pitcher
2012	Fu Yu-kang	傅于剛	Uni-President 7-Eleven Lions	Pitcher
2013	Kuo Hsiu-yen	郭修延	Lamigo Monkeys	Shortstop
2014	Lan Yin-lun	藍寅倫	Lamigo Monkeys	Outfielder
2015	Hsu Chi-hung	許基宏	CTBC Brothers	Outfielder
2016	Wang Po-jung	王柏融	Lamigo Monkeys	Outfielder
2017	Chan Tzu-hsien	詹子賢	CTBC Brothers	Outfielder
2018	Shih Tzu-chien	施子謙	Uni-President 7-Eleven Lions	Pitcher
2019	Chen Chen-wei	陳晨威	Lamigo Monkeys	Outfielder
2020	Lin An-ko	林安可	Uni-President 7-Eleven Lions	Outfielder
2021	Tseng Jyun-yue	曾峻岳	Fubon Guardians	Pitcher
2022	Chen Kuan-wei	陳冠偉	Wei Chuan Dragons	Pitcher
2023	Cheng Hao-chun	鄭浩均	CTBC Brothers	Pitcher
2024	Tseng Tzu-you	曾子祐	TSG Hawks	Shortstop
2025	Lin Shi-xiang	林詩翔	TSG Hawks	Pitcher

== See also ==
- Baseball awards § Taiwan
