= Mike Johnson (1990s pitcher) =

Canadian baseball player (born 1975)

- Pitcher
- Born: October 3, 1975 (age 50); Edmonton, Alberta, Canada
- Batted: Left Threw: Right

Professional debut
- MLB: April 6, 1997, for the Baltimore Orioles
- NPB: June 15, 2002, for the Osaka Kintetsu Buffaloes
- KBO: July 20, 2003, for the Kia Tigers
- CPBL: March 16, 2008, for the La New Bears

Last appearance
- MLB: April 24, 2001, for the Montreal Expos
- NPB: September 22, 2002, for the Osaka Kintetsu Buffaloes
- KBO: April 10, 2009, for the SK Wyverns
- CPBL: June 23, 2009, for the La New Bears

MLB statistics
- Win–loss record: 7–14
- Earned run average: 6.85
- Strikeouts: 147

NPB statistics
- Win–loss record: 1–0
- Earned run average: 6.65
- Strikeouts: 8

KBO statistics
- Win–loss record: 9–2
- Earned run average: 3.94
- Strikeouts: 78

CPBL statistics
- Win–loss record: 22–4
- Earned run average: 2.96
- Strikeouts: 121
- Stats at Baseball Reference

Teams
- Baltimore Orioles (1997); Montreal Expos (1997–2001); Osaka Kintetsu Buffaloes (2002); Kia Tigers (2003, 2005); La New Bears (2008); SK Wyverns (2009); La New Bears (2009)

Career highlights and awards
- CPBL wins leader (2008); CPBL MVP of the Year (2008)
Medals
Men's baseball
Representing Canada
Pan American Games
Gold medal – first place	2011 Guadalajara	Team

Michael Keith Johnson (born October 3, 1975) is a Canadian former professional baseball pitcher who pitched all or part of five seasons in Major League Baseball (MLB), and also played in Nippon Professional Baseball (NPB), KBO League, and the Chinese Professional Baseball League (CPBL).

== Career ==
Johnson was selected by the Toronto Blue Jays in the 1993 Major League Baseball draft, then made his MLB debut on April 6, 1997, with the Baltimore Orioles going on to play for the Orioles (1997) and Montreal Expos (1997–2001).

He was a member of the Team Canada baseball team at the 2004 Summer Olympics, where they finished in fourth place in the tournament.

Johnson played in the Texas Rangers, Los Angeles Dodgers, and San Francisco Giants organizations from 2001 through 2003, before signing with the Expos again in 2004.

In 2006, Johnson played with Somerset of the independent Atlantic League. In 2007, he played for the Edmonton Cracker-Cats of the Northern League. In 2008, he played for the CPBL's La New Bears and won the winningest pitcher and the MVP at the regular season.

On March 7, 2009, he pitched again for Canada in the World Baseball Classic against the USA. For the 2009 season, he signed to play for the SK Wyverns in South Korea after an interval of four years, but was dismissed in April having appeared in just two games. He then signed with the Edmonton Capitals of the Golden Baseball League, for whom he finished the season. He split the 2010 season between the Capitals and Yuma Scorpions.

He is presently a coaching instructor in Edmonton for the St. Francis Xavier high-school baseball Academy.

Awards
Preceded by Pan Wei-lun (潘威倫)	CPBL Win Champion Award; 2008	Succeeded by Itsuki Shoda(正田樹)
Preceded by Pan Wei-lun (潘威倫)	CPBL Best Ten Player Award (pitcher); 2008	Succeeded by current
Preceded by Kao Kuo-ching (高國慶)	CPBL MVP of the Year Award; 2008	Succeeded by Lin Yi-chuan(林益全)
