= Mark Kiefer =

American baseball player (born 1968)

- Pitcher
- Born: November 13, 1968 (age 57); Orange, California, U.S.
- Batted: Right Threw: Right

Professional debut
- MLB: September 20, 1993, for the Milwaukee Brewers
- CPBL: March 5, 1997, for the Sinon Bulls
- KBO: April 7, 2002, for the Kia Tigers

Last appearance
- MLB: April 27, 1996, for the Milwaukee Brewers
- CPBL: October 7, 2000, for the Sinon Bulls
- KBO: July 21, 2004, for the Doosan Bears

MLB statistics
- Win–loss record: 5–1
- Earned run average: 4.29
- Strikeouts: 61

CPBL statistics
- Win–loss record: 55–27
- Earned run average: 2.82
- Strikeouts: 532

KBO statistics
- Win–loss record: 26–18
- Earned run average: 3.79
- Strikeouts: 185
- Stats at Baseball Reference

Teams
- Milwaukee Brewers (1993–1996); Sinon Bulls (1997–2000); Kia Tigers (2002–2003); Doosan Bears (2003–2004)

Career highlights and awards
- CPBL MVP of the Year (2000)

Mark Andrew Kiefer (born November 13, 1968) is an American former Major League Baseball pitcher. He played in parts of four seasons in the majors, from 1993 until 1996, for the Milwaukee Brewers. He pitched a total of 44 games, all in relief. He also played for four years in the Chinese Professional Baseball League for the Sinon Bulls and three years in the KBO League for the Kia Tigers and the Doosan Bears.

A native of Fullerton, California, Kiefer attended Garden Grove High School and Fullerton College. In 1987, he played collegiate summer baseball with the Chatham A's of the Cape Cod Baseball League. He was selected by the Brewers in the 21st round of the 1987 MLB draft.

Kiefer's brother, Steve Kiefer, also played in the major leagues as an infielder.

Mark Kiefer is a scout for the Chicago Cubs (MLB) and was a part of the team that won the World Series in 2016.
