= Lin Yi-chuan =

Taiwanese baseball player (born 1985)

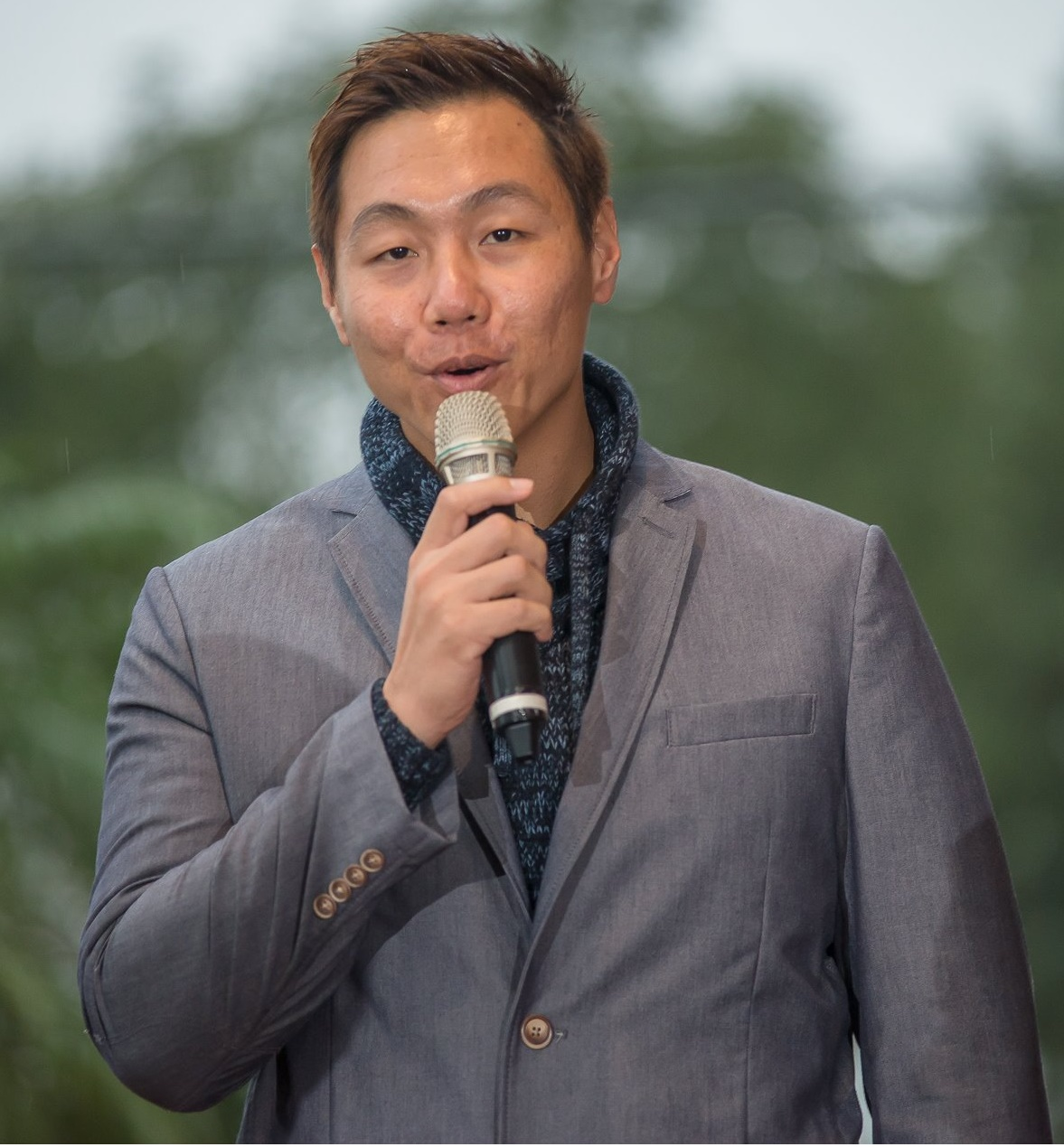

Shanghai Dragons – No. 13
- Infielder
- Born: November 11, 1985 (age 40); Tainan, Taiwan
- Bats: Left Throws: Right

CPBL debut
- March 29, 2009, for the Sinon Bulls

CPBL statistics (through 2025 season)
- Batting average: .332
- Hits: 2,013
- Home runs: 210
- Runs batted in: 1,142
- Stats at Baseball Reference

Teams
- Sinon Bulls / EDA Rhinos / Fubon Guardians (2009–2022); Uni-President Lions (2023–2025); Shanghai Dragons (2025–present)

Career highlights and awards
- Taiwan Series champion (2016); 3x CPBL MVP of the Year (2009, 2013, 2014); CPBL Rookie of the Year (2009)

Lin Yi-chuan (Chinese: 林益全; born November 11, 1985) is a Taiwanese professional baseball infielder for the Shanghai Dragons of Chinese Professional Baseball (CPB). He has previously played in Taiwan's Chinese Professional Baseball League (CPBL) for the Fubon Guardians and the Uni-President Lions.

He was the first position player to be named Rookie of the Year and MVP in the CPBL the same year.

== Career ==
=== Sinon Bulls/EDA Rhinos/Fubon Guardians ===
Lin debuted for the Taiwan national baseball team in the 2005 Asian Baseball Championship, which he led in home runs. He hit .250/.294/.313 as a part-time third sacker in the 2005 Baseball World Cup. In the 2006 Intercontinental Cup, he hit .135/.158/.162 as the starting third baseman for Taiwan. He batted .306/.342/.500 in the 2007 World Port Tournament – he tied Sidney de Jong for fifth in the tournament in home runs (2), tied Yosvani Peraza for 6th in runs (6) and was 6th in RBI (5). His offensive production was similar to the USA's third baseman, top prospect Pedro Alvarez. He helped Taiwan win a Silver Medal. In the 2007 Baseball World Cup, Lin went 0 for 1 as the backup third baseman to Tai-Shan Chang.

Lin hit .130/.231/.174 for Taiwan in the 2008 Final Olympic Qualification Tournament as the starting third baseman. Despite his struggles, they won a spot in the 2008 Summer Olympics. Lin had a couple defensive gaffes in a loss to the South Korean national baseball team. In the second inning, he did not get to a grounder by Dae-ho Lee that reporters said was within his range. Later in the inning, he again did not get to a ball in close range of third hit by Jin-man Park. The two plays, coupled with a Che-Hsuan Lin miscue, contributed to two Korean runs and the win.

Lin was the top pick in the 2007 CPBL draft, taken by the Sinon Bulls. He had played for the amateur Fubon Bull previously. He did not play in 2008, as he was fulfilling his military commitment. In late 2008, he announced that he didn't want to play for Sinon when he came out of the military and that he wanted to remain an amateur. Lin changed his mind and signed with Sinon in March 2009, inking a deal with a signing bonus equivalent to $145,000. That was the second-largest bonus in CPBL history, behind Chung-Nan Tsai and even with Chang-Wei Tu, Chih-Yuan Chen and Yi-Cheng Tseng.

Lin was 0 for 8 with two strikeouts as one of Taiwan's worst performers in the 2009 World Baseball Classic.

Lin had a great pro debut. Manning first base and hitting 7th, he was 3 for 4 in Sinon's 2009 opener. He reached 100 hits in 249 AB and 62 games, the fastest player to that mark in CPBL history to that point. On August 13, he set new CPBL rookie records for RBI (77, surpassing Tai-Shan Chang) and hits (119, breaking the mark held by Chih-Wei Shih). He hit .348/.395/.543 for the 2009 CPBL campaign and drove in 113 runs, breaking Tilson Brito's CPBL record. He finished 4th in average (behind Wu-Hsiung Pan, Cheng-Min Peng and Wilton Veras), second in hits (169, behind Veras) and third in home runs (18, behind Chih-Sheng Lin and Chin-Feng Chen). He won a Gold Glove at first base and made the Best Ten. He was named Rookie of the Year and MVP, the third player and first position player ever to accomplish that double honor; En-Yu Lin had been the last pitcher to pull off the feat (in 2005).

He played in the 2013 World Baseball Classic. 2013CPBL Home Run Derby champion.

Lin won the Taiwan Series with the then EDA Rhinos in 2016. Lin was in the Opening Day lineup for the Fubon Guardians in 2021.

=== Uni-President Lions ===
On January 19, 2023, Lin signed with the Uni-President Lions of the Chinese Professional Baseball League. In 89 games for the Lions, he slashed .306/.357/.387 with three home runs and 54 RBI.

On August 14, 2024, Lin recorded his 2,000th career hit, becoming the third CPBL player to achieve the milestone.

=== Shanghai Dragons ===
Lin joined the Shanghai Dragons of Chinese Professional Baseball in December 2025.

== Career statistics ==
Year	Team	G	AB	H	HR	RBI	SB	BB	SO	TB	GDP	BA	OBP	SLG	OPS
2009	Sinon Bulls	120	486	169	18	113	6	40	46	264	19	0.348	0.395	0.543	0.938
2010	Sinon Bulls	107	406	134	8	55	4	30	52	184	14	0.330	0.374	0.453	0.827
2011	Sinon Bulls	101	368	117	8	55	2	42	56	170	8	0.318	0.383	0.462	0.845
2012	Sinon Bulls	113	450	167	13	92	2	38	46	258	17	0.371	0.419	0.573	0.992
2013	EDA Rhinos	113	417	149	18	79	4	43	42	229	20	0.357	0.415	0.549	0.964
2014	EDA Rhinos	119	465	161	14	88	1	45	33	237	13	0.346	0.398	0.510	0.908
2015	EDA Rhinos	117	452	166	23	126	1	50	53	265	12	0.367	0.422	0.586	1.008
2016	EDA Rhinos	106	417	146	17	81	1	50	62	221	11	0.350	0.416	0.530	0.946
2017	Fubon Guardians	105	385	136	17	71	4	42	50	212	15	0.353	0.420	0.551	0.971
Total	—	1001	3846	1345	136	760	25	339	440	2040	129	0.350	0.405	0.530	0.935

Awards
Preceded by Tilson Brito	CPBL RBI Champion Award; 2009	Succeeded by Lin Chih-sheng(林智勝)
Preceded by Lin Chi-wei(林其緯)	CPBL Rookie of the Year Award; 2009	Succeeded by Wang Ching-ming(王鏡銘)
Preceded by Mike Johnson; Chou Ssu-chi(周思齊)	CPBL MVP of the Year Award; 2009; 2013-14	Succeeded by Peng Cheng-min(彭政閔); Lin Chih-sheng(林智勝)
