= Chang Chih-hao =

Taiwanese baseball player (born 1987)

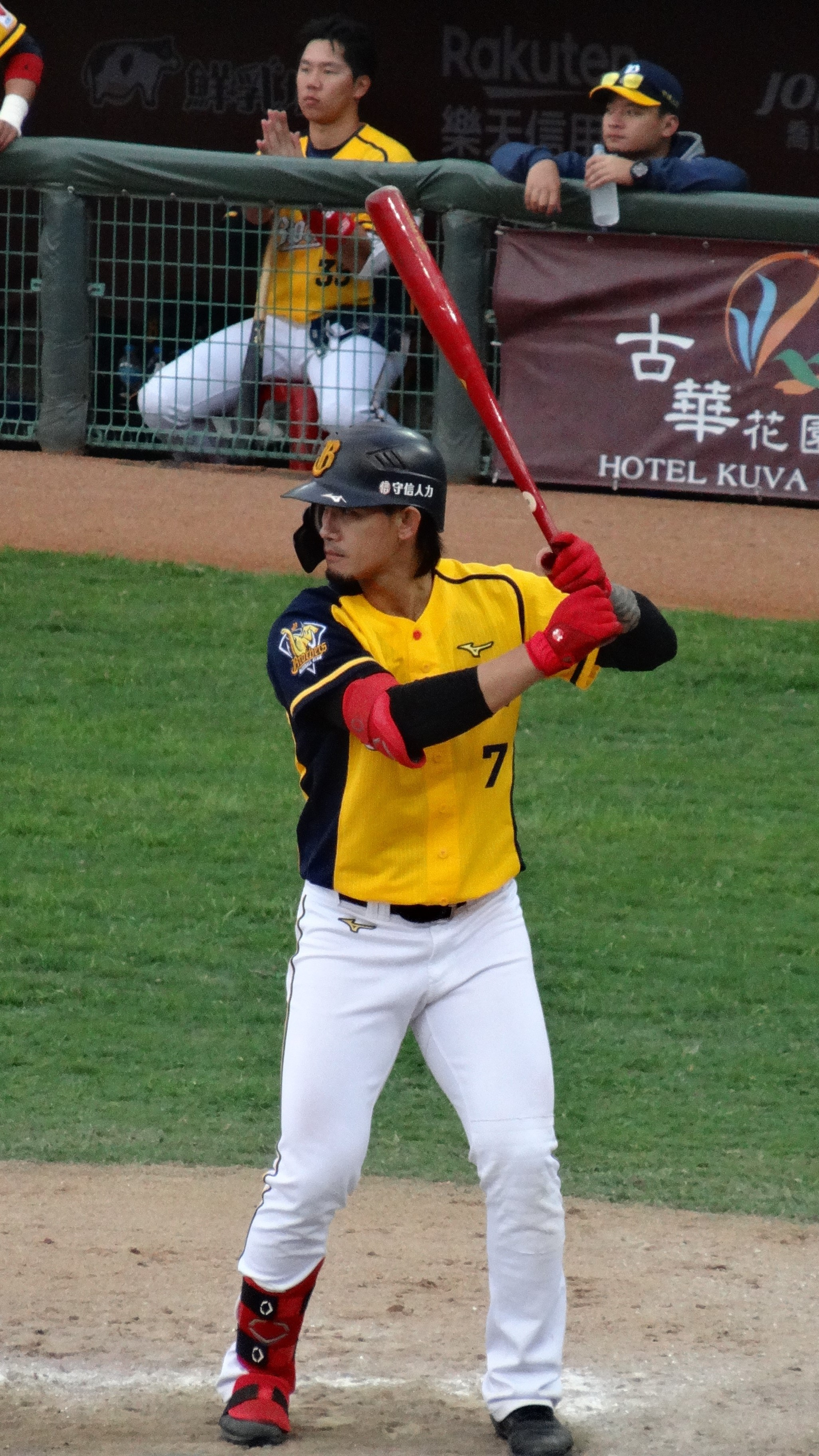

CTBC Brothers – No. 7
- Outfielder
- Born: May 15, 1987 (age 38); Taitung County, Taiwan
- Bats: Left Throws: Right

CPBL debut
- March 20, 2010, for the Brother Elephants

CPBL statistics (through 2025)
- Batting average: .272
- Hits: 1259
- Home runs: 180
- Runs batted in: 742
- Stats at Baseball Reference

Teams
- Brother Elephants / Chinatrust Brothers / CTBC Brothers (2010–present)

Career highlights and awards
- 4x Taiwan Series champion (2010, 2021, 2022, 2024); CPBL home run champion (2018)

Chang Chih-hao (Chinese: 張志豪; pinyin: Zhāng Zhìháo; born May 15, 1987), or Aluken Fanu in Amis, is a Taiwanese professional baseball outfielder for the CTBC Brothers of the Chinese Professional Baseball League (CPBL).

He represented Taiwan at the 2009 World Port Tournament, 2015 WBSC Premier12, and the 2017 World Baseball Classic.

== Career ==
=== Brother Elephants/CTBC Brothers ===
Chang was drafted by the Brother Elephants in the 2nd round of the 2009 CPBL Draft with a signing fee of 3 million NTD. On his debut, Chang hit a single against the Uni-President 7-Eleven Lions, marking his first hit. In his rookie year, 2010, Chang batted .254 with 13 stolen bases, 10 triples, and 1 home run. Chang won the Taiwan Series with the Brothers in 2010.

In 2015, Chang was selected by Kuo Tai-yuan, the manager of the Chinese Taipei national team, to play in the 2015 WBSC Premier12 competition. He batted 1 for 4 in one game against Canada, in a game where Chinese Taipei lost 9-8. The team ended up getting 9th place at the tournament.

In the 2016 season, Chang started off the year with a 21-game hitting streak. Chang led the league in home runs during the 2018 season, with 22 home runs.

Chang was selected to play for Chinese Taipei in the 2019 WBSC Premier12 tournament. The team finished 5th place, behind the United States.

On October 24, 2020, Chang hit his 150th home run against Pan Wei-lun of the Uni-President 7-Eleven Lions.

On July 13, 2021, Chang underwent Tommy John surgery, ending his 2021 season. As of June 2025, Chang has not played more than 80 games since then.
