= List of CPBL MVP of the Year Award =

The CPBL MVP of the Year Award is an annual award given to one outstanding player of Chinese Professional Baseball League. The Award has been given since 1993.

== List of winners ==
Year	Player	Chinese name	Team	Position
1993	(Taiwan) Chen Yi-hsin	陳義信	Brother Elephants	Pitcher
1994	(Taiwan) Chen Yi-hsin	陳義信	Brother Elephants	Pitcher
1995	(Taiwan) Kuo Chin-hsing	郭進興	Uni-President Lions	Pitcher
1996	(Taiwan) Kuo Chin-hsing	郭尚豪	Uni-President Lions	Pitcher
1997	(United States) Michael Garcia	賈 西 M.G.	Wei Chuan Dragons	Pitcher
1998	(United States) Jay Kirkpatrick	怪力男 J.K.	Sinon Bulls	First baseman
1999	(Taiwan) Tsao Chun-yang	曹竣揚	Uni-President Lions	Pitcher
2000	(United States) Mark Kiefer	楓 康 M.K.	Sinon Bulls	Pitcher
2001	(Taiwan) Lo Min-ching	羅敏卿	Uni-President Lions	Designated hitter
2002	(Taiwan) Sung Chao-chi	宋肇基	Chinatrust Whales	Pitcher
2003	(Taiwan) Chang Tai-shan	張泰山	Sinon Bulls	Third baseman
2004	(United States) Michael Garcia	凱 撒 M.G.	Uni-President Lions	Pitcher
2005	(Taiwan) Lin En-yu	林恩宇	Macoto Cobras	Pitcher
2006	(Taiwan) Lin En-yu	林恩宇	Macoto Cobras	Pitcher
2007	(Taiwan) Kao Kuo-ching	高國慶	Uni-President Lions	First baseman
2008	(Canada) Mike Johnson	強 森 M.J.	La New Bears	Pitcher
2009	(Taiwan) Lin Yi-chuan	林益全	Sinon Bulls	First baseman
2010	(Taiwan) Peng Cheng-min	彭政閔	Brother Elephants	First baseman
2011	(Taiwan) Lin Hung-yu	林泓育	Lamigo Monkeys	Catcher
2012	(Taiwan) Chou Szu-chi	周思齊	Brother Elephants	Outfielder
2013	(Taiwan) Lin Yi-chuan	林益全	EDA Rhinos	First baseman
2014	(Taiwan) Lin Yi-chuan	林益全	EDA Rhinos	First baseman
2015	(Taiwan) Lin Chih-Sheng	林智勝	Lamigo Monkeys	Shortstop
2016	(Taiwan) Wang Po-jung	王柏融	Lamigo Monkeys	Outfielder
2017	(Taiwan) Wang Po-jung	王柏融	Lamigo Monkeys	Outfielder
2018	(Taiwan) Chen Chun-Hsiu	陳俊秀	Lamigo Monkeys	First baseman
2019	(Taiwan) Chu Yu-Hsien	朱育賢	Lamigo Monkeys	Outfielder
2020	(Dominican Republic) José de Paula	德保拉 J.P.	CTBC Brothers	Pitcher
2021	(Dominican Republic) José de Paula	德保拉 J.P.	CTBC Brothers	Pitcher
2022	(Taiwan) Lin Li	林 立	Rakuten Monkeys	Second baseman
2023	(United States) Andrew Miles Gagnon	鋼 龍 A.G.	Wei Chuan Dragons	Pitcher
2024	(Taiwan) Gu Lin Ruei-yang	古林睿煬	Uni-President 7-Eleven Lions	Pitcher
2025	(Dominican Republic) Pedro Fernández	威能帝P.F.	Rakuten Monkeys	Pitcher

== See also ==
- Baseball awards#Taiwan
