= Chang Cheng-wei =

Taiwanese baseball player (born 1986)

- Outfielder
- Born: 5 August 1986 (age 39); Taitung County, Taiwan
- Batted: Left Threw: Left

CPBL debut
- March 20, 2010, for the Brother Elephants

Last CPBL appearance
- May 5, 2021, for the Fubon Guardians

CPBL statistics
- Batting average: .323
- Home runs: 15
- Runs batted in: 393
- Stats at Baseball Reference

Teams
- Brother Elephants/Chinatrust Brother Elephants (2010–2017); Fubon Guardians (2018–2021)

Chang Cheng-wei (Chinese: 張正偉; pinyin: Zhāng Zhèngwěi; born 5 August 1986) is a Taiwanese former professional baseball outfielder. He played in the Chinese Professional Baseball League (CPBL) for the Brother Elephants / Chinatrust Brother Elephants and Fubon Guardians from 2010 to 2021.

== Career ==
He made his debut in the Chinese Professional Baseball League at age 23. Chang is the nephew of Chang Tai-shan and a cousin of Chang Chih-hao.

Chang was drafted by the Sinon Bulls in 2008. He led the Taiwanese minors in hits (81) and average (a record .409) in 2009. When Sinon let him go, he signed with the Brother Elephants. On March 20, he got his first CPBL hit, a single off Wei-Lun Pan. He hit .297/.360/.377 as a rookie with 15 steals (but 10 times caught). He was 8th in the 2010 CPBL in average.

Chang joined the Fubon Guardians for the 2018 season after spending 2010 to 2017 with the Brothers.

== International career ==
He played for Chinese Taipei in the 2013 World Baseball Classic Qualification, 2013 World Baseball Classic and 2017 World Baseball Classic.
