= 2009 World Port Tournament =

The 2009 World Port Tournament is an international baseball competition held at the DOOR Neptunus Familiestadion in Rotterdam, The Netherlands from July 2–12, 2009. It was the 12th edition of the tournament and featured teams from Chinese Taipei, Cuba, Japan and the Netherlands.

Originally, USA Baseball would send an All-Star team from the Great South League, but due to missing papers, the team had to withdraw from the tournament, one day before starting. The organization of the tournament decided that the four teams would meet each other a third time in the tournament.

== Group stage ==
=== Standings ===
Qualified for the final
Did not qualify for the final

#	Team	Games	Wins	Tie	Losses
1	Cuba	9	7	1	1
2	Netherlands	9	4	0	5
3	Chinese Taipei	9	3	1	5
4	Japan	9	3	0	6

^1 Game 10 was postponed due to rain to Thursday morning, right before Game 13. Due to this double game, it was rule out to continue after the end of the 9th inning. It was the first time ever since 1989, that a full game ended in a tie.
^2 Chinese Taipei is the official IBAF designation for the team representing the state officially referred to as the Republic of China, more commonly known as Taiwan. (See also political status of Taiwan for details.)

=== Game results ===
Team	1	2	3	4	5	6	7	8	9	10	11	R	H	E
Chinese Taipei	0	0	2	0	0	0	1	0	0	0	1	4	9	2
Japan	0	0	0	1	0	2	0	0	0	0	0	3	10	1

Team	1	2	3	4	5	6	7	8	9	R	H	E
Japan	0	0	0	0	0	0	0	0	0	0	3	1
Cuba	0	2	0	3	0	3	0	0	X	8	12	0

Team	1	2	3	4	5	6	7	8	9	R	H	E
Chinese Taipei	0	0	0	0	1	0	0	0	0	1	4	2
Cuba	0	0	3	3	2	1	0	0	X	9	16	0

Team	1	2	3	4	5	6	7	8	9	R	H	E
Netherlands	1	0	0	1	0	2	0	2	0	6	14	1
Cuba	4	1	4	0	0	0	1	0	X	10	15	1

Team	1	2	3	4	5	6	7	8	9	R	H	E
Netherlands	2	0	0	0	2	3	0	1	0	8	16	0
Japan	0	0	0	0	0	0	0	0	0	0	4	1

Team	1	2	3	4	5	6	7	R	H	E
Japan	0	0	0	0	0	0	0	0	1	1
Cuba	0	3	0	0	1	6	X	10	10	1

Team	1	2	3	4	5	6	7	8	9	R	H	E
Cuba	0	0	0	0	0	2	0	3	0	5	8	0
Chinese Taipei	0	0	0	0	1	0	3	0	0	4	9	0

Team	1	2	3	4	5	6	7	8	9	R	H	E
Chinese Taipei	0	0	1	2	2	1	1	1	0	8	15	1
Japan	0	0	0	0	1	0	0	0	0	1	5	0

Team	1	2	3	4	5	6	7	8	9	R	H	E
Japan	1	0	0	0	1	0	0	0	0	2	8	1
Cuba	0	0	0	0	1	0	0	0	0	1	4	1

Team	1	2	3	4	5	6	7	8	9	R	H	E
Cuba	0	0	1	0	0	0	0	0	0	1	9	0
Netherlands	0	0	0	0	0	0	0	0	0	0	4	0

Team	1	2	3	4	5	6	7	8	9	R	H	E
Netherlands	0	0	0	0	0	0	1	2	0	3	8	0
Chinese Taipei	0	0	0	2	0	3	0	3	X	8	9	1

Team	1	2	3	4	5	6	7	8	9	R	H	E
Japan	0	0	0	1	0	2	0	3	0	6	12	1
Netherlands	0	0	0	0	0	0	0	0	0	0	3	1

Team	1	2	3	4	5	6	7	8	9	R	H	E
Japan	0	3	0	1	1	0	0	1	0	6	11	1
Chinese Taipei	0	0	0	0	0	0	0	0	1	1	6	2

Team	1	2	3	4	5	6	7	8	9	R	H	E
Chinese Taipei	0	0	1	0	0	0	0	0	0	1	5	1
Cuba	0	0	0	0	0	1	0	0	0	1	6	2

^1 Game 10, was originally scheduled on July 7, 2009 on 19:00 UTC+1.
Due to rain the game was postponed to July 9, 2009.

Team	1	2	3	4	5	6	7	8	9	R	H	E
Chinese Taipei	0	0	0	0	0	0	0	0	1	1	8	0
Netherlands	1	0	0	0	1	0	0	0	X	2	5	1

Team	1	2	3	4	5	6	7	8	9	R	H	E
Japan	0	0	1	0	0	0	2	0	0	3	5	1
Netherlands	0	0	0	0	0	1	0	1	2	4	11	2

Team	1	2	3	4	5	6	7	8	9	R	H	E
Cuba	0	1	0	7	0	0	0	0	0	8	17	0
Netherlands	0	1	0	0	0	0	0	1	0	2	2	1

Team	1	2	3	4	5	6	7	8	9	R	H	E
Netherlands	0	0	0	1	0	1	4	0	0	6	7	1
Chinese Taipei	0	0	0	2	1	1	1	0	0	5	12	3

== Championship game ==
Team	1	2	3	4	5	6	7	8	9	R	H	E
Netherlands	0	1	0	0	0	2	0	0	0	3	6	1
Cuba	0	1	0	0	2	1	2	3	X	9	17	1

== Tournament awards and statistics ==
Leading Hitter	(Cuba) Adonis García
Best Pitcher	(Cuba) Maikel Folch
Home run King	(Cuba) Yoelvis Fiss
Most Valuable Player	(Cuba) Yoelvis Fiss
Most Popular Player	(Netherlands) Nick Urbanus
Rookie Award	(Netherlands) Nick Urbanus
Donald Bax Press Award	(Netherlands) Bas de Jong
