= Tilson Brito =

Dominican baseball player

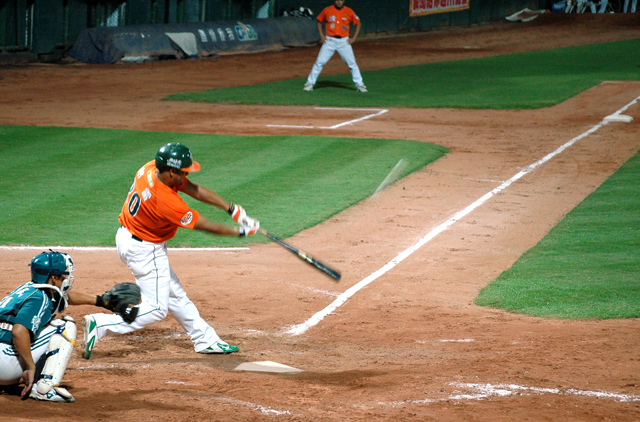
- Brito in a 2007 game as a member of the Uni-President Lions.
- Third baseman
- Born: May 28, 1972 (age 54); Santo Domingo, Dominican Republic
- Batted: Right Threw: Right

Professional debut
- MLB: April 1, 1996, for the Toronto Blue Jays
- KBO: May 6, 2000, for the SK Wyverns
- CPBL: August 17, 2006, for the Uni-President Lions

Last appearance
- MLB: September 28, 1997, for the Oakland Athletics
- KBO: October 10, 2005, for the Hanwha Eagles
- CPBL: October 8, 2008, for the Uni-President 7-Eleven Lions

MLB statistics
- Batting average: .238
- Home runs: 3
- Runs batted in: 21

KBO statistics
- Batting average: .292
- Home runs: 112
- Runs batted in: 391

CPBL statistics
- Batting average: .316
- Home runs: 66
- Runs batted in: 234
- Stats at Baseball Reference

Teams
- Toronto Blue Jays (1996–1997); Oakland Athletics (1997); SK Wyverns (2000–2001); Samsung Lions (2002–2003); SK Wyverns (2004); Hanwha Eagles (2005); Uni-President Lions (2006–2008)

Career highlights and awards
- 2× CPBL home run champion (2007-2008); 2× Taiwan Series champion (2007-2008)

Tilson Manuel Brito Jiménez (born May 28, 1972, in Santo Domingo, Dominican Republic) is a Dominican former professional baseball third baseman. He played in Major League Baseball (MLB) for the Toronto Blue Jays and Oakland Athletics. He also played in the KBO League for the SK Wyverns and Hanwha Eagles, and in the Chinese Professional Baseball League (CPBL) for the Uni-President Lions.

Brito played parts of two seasons in Major League Baseball with the Toronto Blue Jays and the Oakland Athletics, last appearing in the major leagues in 1997.

He resurfaced in Korea in 2000, playing six seasons in the KBO League, for the SK Wyverns (2000–2001, 2004), the Samsung Lions (2002–2003), and the Hanwha Eagles (2005). For his KBO career, he hit .292 with 112 home runs and 391 RBI. With six seasons in the KBO, Brito had one of the longest careers of any foreign player.

From 2006–2008, he played for the Uni-President 7-Eleven Lions of Chinese Professional Baseball League in Taiwan.

In the 2007 season, Brito had 33 home runs and 107 RBI, leading the league in both categories. His 33 homers set the record for most home runs in a single season of Chinese Professional Baseball League. (The record was later broken by Kuo-Hui Kao, who hit 39 home runs in the 2015 season.) Brito again led the CPBL in home runs and RBI in 2008, with 24 and 102 respectively.

== Career statistics ==
=== Major League Baseball ===
Year	Team	G	AB	H	HR	RBI	SB	BB	SO	Avg
1996	Toronto Blue Jays	26	80	19	1	7	1	10	18	.238
1997	Toronto Blue Jays	49	126	28	0	8	1	9	28	.222
1997	Oakland Athletics	17	46	13	2	6	0	1	10	.283
Career	2 seasons	92	252	60	3	21	2	20	56	.238

=== Korea Baseball Organization ===
Year	Team	G	H	HR	RBI	SB	BB	SO	Avg
2000	SK Wyverns	103	137	15	70	3	31	55	.338
2001	SK Wyverns	122	135	22	80	7	57	53	.320
2002	Samsung Lions	128	136	25	90	1	35	84	.283
2003	Samsung Lions	102	97	20	58	2	31	58	.255
2004	SK Wyverns	102	96	13	50	0	34	57	.261
2005	Hanwha Eagles	78	82	17	43	0	11	45	.286
Career	6 seasons	635	683	112	391	13	199	352	.292

=== Chinese Professional Baseball League ===
Year	Team	G	H	HR	RBI	SB	BB	SO	Avg
2006	Uni-President Lions	28	29	9	25	0	15	16	.282
2007	Uni-President Lions	99	125	33	107	1	54	44	.313
2008	Uni-President 7-Eleven Lions	96	119	24	102	0	52	39	.330
Career	3 seasons	223	273	66	234	1	121	99	.316
