= Pan Wu-hsiung =

Taiwanese baseball player (born 1981)

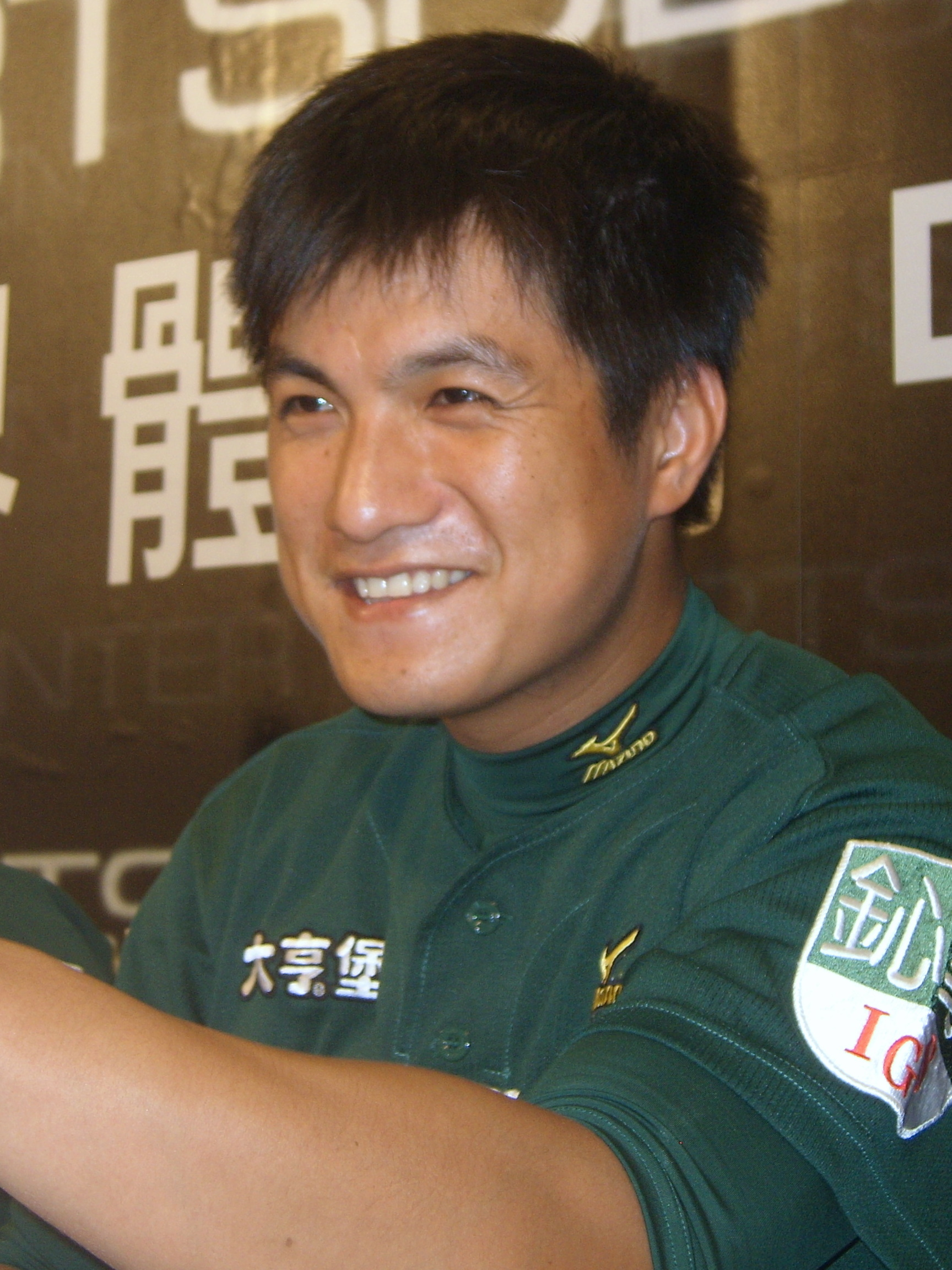

Uni-President Lions – No. 55
- Right field / Coach
- Born: 11 March 1981 (age 45); Wanluan Township, Pingtung County, Taiwan
- Bats: Left Throws: Left

debut
- March 21, 2006, for the Uni-President Lions

Career statistics (through 2007)
- Games: 106
- Batting average: 0.309
- Hits: 122
- Home runs: 6
- RBIs: 50
- Stolen bases: 3
- Stats at Baseball Reference

Teams
- Uni-President Lions (2006–2022)

Career highlights and awards
- CPBL Rookie of the Year (2007); 6x Taiwan Series champion (2007-2009, 2011, 2013, 2020)

Pan Wu-hsiung (Chinese: 潘武雄; pinyin: Pān Wǔxióng; Wade–Giles: Pan^{1} Wu^{3} Hsiung^{2}; born 11 March 1981) is a Taiwanese former baseball player for the Uni-President Lions of the Chinese Professional Baseball League (CPBL). He currently plays as an outfielder for the Lions, and has been constantly shifted between all three outfield positions. His nickname "Take" (pronounced TA-KEH) derives from the Japanese pronunciation of the first character of his given name.

== Early life ==
As a native to Pingtung, Taiwan, "Take" began formal baseball training in fifth grade in his hometown elementary school, as many other Taiwanese baseball players had. He was invited to attend the famed Meiho Middle School and Meiho High School (Chinese: 美和中學), a secondary school system which has a long history in the development of baseball. He played on the baseball team during his six years in Meiho, playing in the outfield. He stated in an interview that he originally asked to become a pitcher, but was refused by the coach who instead given him a position in the outfield.

After graduating from Meiho, he joined "Taiwan Cooperative Bank Baseball Team, a team in Taiwan's amateur league. He entered the draft in 2004, and was selected by the Sinon Bulls in the first round. However, he and the Bulls could not reach an agreement on a contract, so he elected to return to the amateur league and waited for almost two years before entering the draft again.

== Professional career ==
"Take" was drafted by Uni-President Lions in 2005 in the second round, and immediately reached an agreement with the Lions. He made his debut on March 21, 2006 as the starting right fielder, and struck out on his first at-bat. He played only 14 games with 40 at-bets in 2006 before injury ended his season. As a result of the limited game time in 2006, he was eligible for the Rookie of the Year award in 2007, which he won. He was able to recover before the playoffs, and subsequently hit his first career home run in the game against the Sinon Bulls on October 21. His first home run in regular season came on April 10, 2007 from Macoto Cobras.

Between June 22 and July 5, 2008, Pan hit home runs in six consecutive games.

== International career ==
He was selected Chinese Taipei national baseball team at the 2008 Olympics, 2009 World Baseball Classic and 2018 MLB Japan All-Star Series exhibition game against Japan.
