= Huang Chung-yi =

Taiwanese baseball player

- Second baseman
- Born: 12 October 1967 (age 58); Hualien County, Taiwan
- Batted: Right Threw: Right

CPBL debut
- March 12, 1993, for the Jungo Bears

Last CPBL appearance
- October 10, 2008, for the Sinon Bulls

CPBL statistics
- Batting average: .298
- Home runs: 105
- Runs batted in: 650
- Stats at Baseball Reference

Teams
- As player: Jungo Bears (1993–1995); Sinon Bulls (1996–2008); As coach/manager: Sinon Bulls Manager (2007); Sinon Bulls Defense Coach (2009–2012)
Medals
Representing Chinese Taipei
Men's baseball
Olympic Games
Silver medal – second place	1992 Barcelona	Team
Asian Games
Silver medal – second place	2002 Busan	Team
Bronze medal – third place	1998 Bangkok	Team
Asian Baseball Championship
Silver medal – second place	1989 Seoul	Team
Silver medal – second place	1991 Beijing	Team
Bronze medal – third place	1999 Seoul	Team
Silver medal – second place	2003 Sapporo	Team
Silver medal – second place	2005 Miyazaki	Team

Huang Chung-yi (Chinese: 黃忠義; pinyin: Huáng Zhōngyì; born 12 October 1967 in Hualien County, Taiwan) is a Taiwanese retired baseball player.

== Career ==
A bright star since young, Huang competed in the 1992 Summer Olympics and won the silver medal. After the 1992 Olympics Huang entered CPBL along with then just-established Jungo Bears and stayed with the team and its successors Sinon Bears and Sinon Bulls to date. With his seniority and the so many accomplishments achieved, he was appointed as head coach by the Sinon Bulls after the end of CPBL's 2006 season, but still maintains the identity of player.

Huang's major achievements during his CPBL career:

- Hit 3 home runs in a single game in his rookie year on April 27, 1993(versus China Times Eagles in Taichung Baseball Field), the 2nd player to achieve so in the CPBL history.
- Reached career 1000th hits fastest in the CPBL history on June 13, 2002, in within only 876 games.
- Accumulates most appearances(1332 appearances as of July 2007) and most hits(1509 hits as of July 2007) in the CPBL history, and are still accumulating.
- Competed in the 1992 and 2004 Olympics, at an interval of 12 years.

== Basic information ==
- Number: 17 (1989~ )
- Height: 174 cm
- Weight: 82 kg
- Bats/throws: R/R
- Position: second baseman

== Career statistics ==
In 1992 Olympics:

Batting average	Games	At bat	Runs	Hits	RBI	Doubles	Triples	HR	K	BB
.324	9	37	8	12	4	2	1	1	3	2

CPBL career:

Year	Club	Games	At bat	Runs	Hits	Doubles	Triples	HR	RBI	Total Bases	BB	K	Stolen Bases	Caught Stealing	Hitting average
1993	Jungo Bears	90	349	60	105	12	3	11	42	156	46	43	16	14	0.301
1994	Jungo Bears	86	337	56	91	17	8	2	28	130	44	50	8	11	0.270
1995	Jungo Bears	100	369	58	92	13	4	6	31	131	47	56	13	6	0.249
1996	Sinon Bulls	93	355	57	118	19	1	9	45	166	50	47	11	8	0.332
1997	Sinon Bulls	94	374	62	98	14	0	4	34	124	44	54	8	4	0.262
1998	Sinon Bulls	105	430	65	135	23	4	10	46	196	47	38	14	9	0.314
1999	Sinon Bulls	90	329	45	93	25	4	3	39	135	37	35	20	2	0.283
2000	Sinon Bulls	88	325	52	115	19	0	11	51	167	39	30	23	9	0.354
2001	Sinon Bulls	88	334	39	97	16	2	4	35	129	47	29	17	5	0.290
2002	Sinon Bulls	88	328	51	107	20	1	15	68	174	36	30	10	7	0.326
2003	Sinon Bulls	96	370	50	111	19	2	6	46	152	36	38	9	3	0.300
2004	Sinon Bulls	97	356	62	111	16	1	11	57	162	46	42	4	2	0.312
2005	Sinon Bulls	100	362	39	100	14	1	5	40	131	38	54	3	5	0.276
2006	Sinon Bulls	100	367	37	125	17	2	4	52	158	34	33	2	1	0.341
