= Lin En-yu =

Taiwanese baseball player (born 1981)

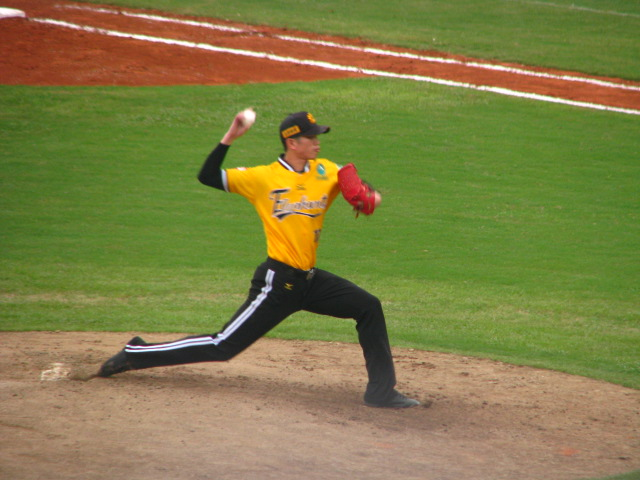

CTBC Brothers – No. 78
- Pitcher / Coach
- Born: 25 March 1981 (age 45); Tainan City, Taiwan
- Batted: Right Threw: Right

Professional debut
- CPBL: April 21, 2005, for the Macoto Cobras
- NPB: April 13, 2007, for the Tohoku Rakuten Golden Eagles

Last appearance
- NPB: October 4, 2007, for the Tohoku Rakuten Golden Eagles
- CPBL: April 10, 2014, for the Chinatrust Brothers

CPBL statistics
- Win–loss record: 38–23
- Earned run average: 2.37
- Strikeouts: 446

NPB statistics
- Win–loss record: 1–3
- Earned run average: 3.63
- Strikeouts: 28
- Stats at Baseball Reference

Teams
- Macoto Cobras (2005–2006); Tohoku Rakuten Golden Eagles (2007–2009); Brother Elephants/Chinatrust Brothers (2010–2014)

Career highlights and awards
- 2x CPBL MVP of the Year (2005, 2006); CPBL Rookie of the Year (2005)
Medals
Representing Chinese Taipei
Men's baseball
Intercontinental Cup
Bronze medal – third place	2006 Taichung	Team
Asian Baseball Championship
Silver medal – second place	2003 Sapporo	Team
Bronze medal – third place	2007 Taichung	Team

Lin En-yu (Chinese: 林恩宇; pinyin: Lín Enyǔ; Wade–Giles: Lin^{2} En^{1} Yü^{3}; born 25 March 1981) is a Taiwanese former professional baseball pitcher. After serving on the Taiwanese national training team in 2003 and 2004, he was drafted by the Macoto Cobras of the Chinese Professional Baseball League (CPBL) in Taiwan in early 2005 and stayed with the team until the end of 2006. He later played for Tohoku Rakuten Golden Eagles of the Nippon Professional Baseball (NPB) in Japan starting 2007, under the introduction of former Cobras manager Kuo Tai-yuan and following his teammate Lin Ying-chieh. Lin throws a variety of different pitches and has a fastball speed up to 151 km/h (94 mph), and has been a frequent member of the national team.

== Records ==
Season	Team	G	IP	W	L	ERA	K
2005	Macoto Cobras	31	167.2	12	8	1.72	152
2006	Macoto Cobras	31	202.2	17	8	1.73	209
2007	Tohoku Rakuten Golden Eagles	8	34.2	1	3	3.63	28

== Achievements ==
- In his first 2005 CPBL season Lin won the following awards: rookie of the year, best nine players on the field, and the annual most valuable player.
- Lin pitched the first historical ball in World Baseball Classic history on March 3, 2006, at the Tokyo Dome (Chinese Taipei vs. South Korea).
- In the 2006 CPBL season, Lin set the record of achieving most strike outs in a single season in the CPBL history (209K in 202.2 innings), as well as led in wins and earned run average.
