= Chang Tai-shan =

Taiwanese baseball player

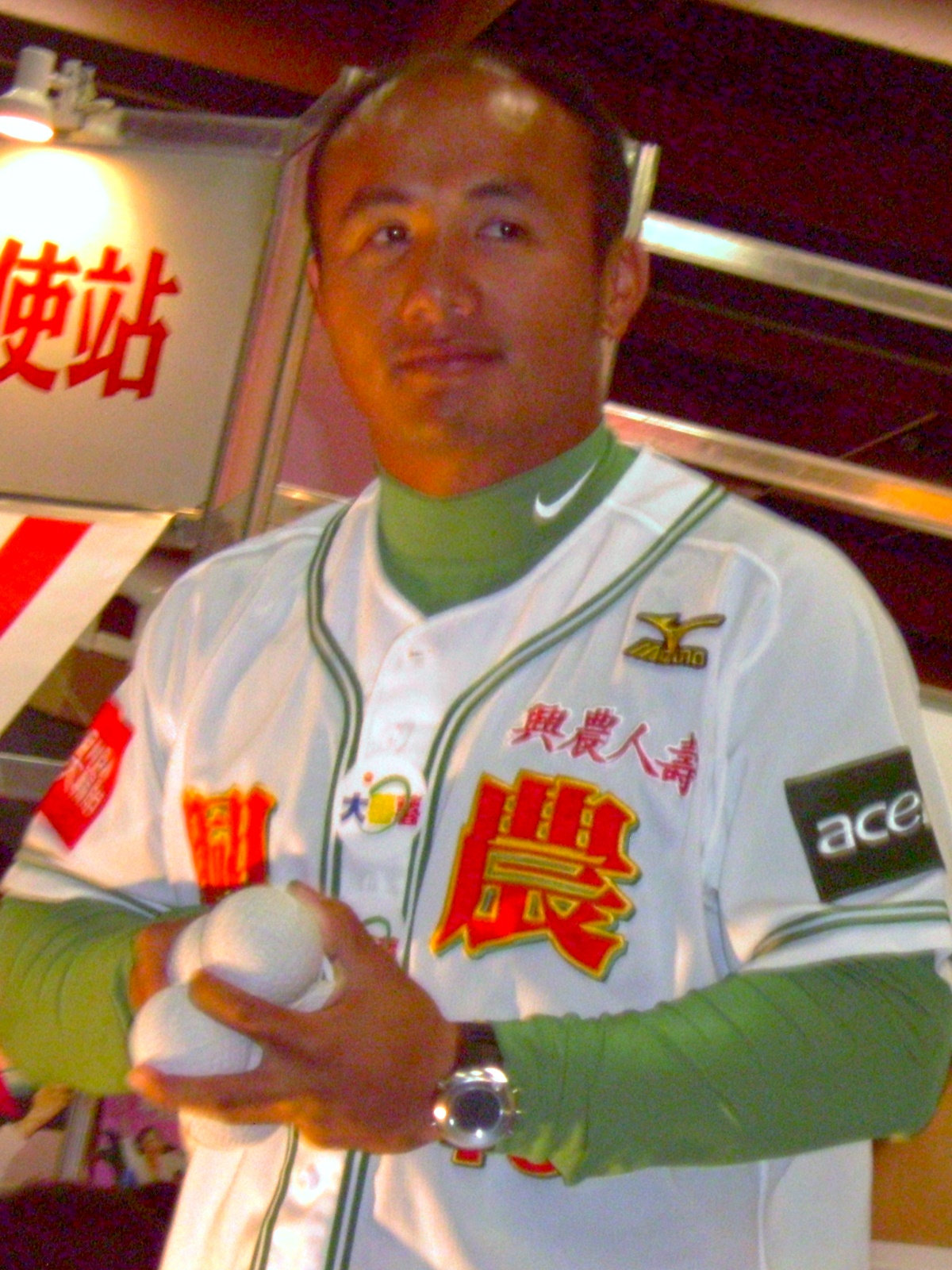
- Third baseman / Coach
- Born: October 31, 1976 (age 49); Taitung, Taiwan
- Bats: Right Throws: Right

CPBL debut
- March 20, 1996, for the Wei Chuan Dragons

CPBL statistics (through 2015)
- Batting average: .307
- Home runs: 289
- Runs batted in: 1338
- Hits: 2134
- Stats at Baseball Reference

Teams
- Player: Wei Chuan Dragons (1996–1999); Sinon Bulls (2000–2010); Uni-President 7-Eleven Lions (2011–2015); Coach: Wei Chuan Dragons (2019–2024)

Career highlights and awards
- CPBL Rookie of the Year (1996); CPBL Golden Glove Award (1999, 2000, 2001); CPBL MVP of the Year (2003); 7x Taiwan Series champion (1997, 1998, 1999, 2004, 2005, 2011, 2013)
Medals
Men's baseball
Representing Chinese Taipei
Baseball World Cup
Bronze medal – third place	2001 Taipei	Team
Intercontinental Cup
Bronze medal – third place	2006 Taichung	Team
Asian Games
Gold medal – first place	2006 Doha	Team
Silver medal – second place	2010 Guangzhou	Team
Asian Baseball Championship
Silver medal – second place	2003 Sapporo	Team
Bronze medal – third place	2007 Taichung	Team

Chang Tai-shan (Chinese: 張泰山; pinyin: Zhāng Tàishān; Amis name Ati Masaw; born 31 October 1976 in Taitung, Taiwan), is a Taiwanese former professional baseball player and current coach.

== Career ==
He originally drafted by the Wei Chuan Dragons in 1996, he has played for the Sinon Bulls and Uni-President Lions of the Chinese Professional Baseball League. A well-known slugger, Chang has been a frequent member of the Chinese Taipei national baseball team since 1998 and holds the record of hitting the most home runs in CPBL history with 289. He also holds the career record for hits with 2,134.

He was missing from the Olympic Games as because he tested positive for a banned substance. Chang denies taking any banned drugs and thinks it may be because of medication he took. As a result of the test he may be banned for 3 years.

He was traded from Sinon Bulls to Uni-Lions for cash considerations of NT$2.5 Million (about US$85,000). His contract with the Lions expired after the 2015 CPBL season and he signed with the Tokushima Indigo Socks of the independent Shikoku Island League in Japan for 2016.

Chang signed on to play in the Australian Baseball League for the 2017-18 season with the Adelaide Bite.

== Career statistics ==
Season	Team	G	AB	R	H	2B	3B	HR	RBI	TB	BB	SO	SB	CS	AVG
1996	Wei Chuan Dragons	94	336	54	112	28	1	16	72	190	11	48	7	2	.333
1997	Wei Chuan Dragons	91	338	44	88	14	3	9	56	135	26	54	12	6	.260
1998	Wei Chuan Dragons	103	372	63	120	29	4	14	78	199	40	56	27	9	.323
1999	Wei Chuan Dragons	87	327	60	105	12	3	17	70	174	30	45	18	8	.321
2000	Sinon Bulls	78	280	39	71	10	1	11	38	116	16	38	11	3	.254
2001	Sinon Bulls	79	291	50	74	9	1	13	53	124	30	45	6	4	.254
2002	Sinon Bulls	70	245	38	66	13	3	10	57	115	28	32	3	0	.269
2003	Sinon Bulls	100	396	82	130	21	4	28	94	243	46	65	22	8	.328
2004	Sinon Bulls	100	377	73	127	21	0	21	94	211	39	57	14	7	.337
2005	Sinon Bulls	95	348	59	106	12	0	15	60	163	25	54	3	5	.305
2006	Sinon Bulls	100	373	62	130	17	0	24	72	219	41	46	4	4	.349
2007	Sinon Bulls	100	402	62	128	19	0	19	80	204	29	55	12	1	.318
2008	Sinon Bulls	82	302	46	104	17	1	11	65	156	23	41	6	2	.344
2009	Sinon Bulls	107	398	52	119	22	1	17	63	194	33	51	2	4	.299
Career total		1286	4785	784	1480	244	22	225	952	2443	474	687	147	60	.309
