= List of CPBL strikeout champions =

The Chinese Professional Baseball League (CPBL) recognizes strikeout champions in the each season. Champions have been awarded from 1994.

== Champions ==
| Year | Player | Team | Strikeouts |
|---|---|---|---|
| 1990 | (Taiwan) Huang Ping-yang (黃平洋); (Panama) Enrique Burgos (瑞 奇E.B.) | Wei Chuan Dragons; Uni-President Lions | 177 |
| 1991 | (Panama) Enrique Burgos (瑞 奇E.B.) | Uni-President Lions | 138 |
| 1992 | (United States) Joe Strong (史 東J.S.) | Wei Chuan Dragons | 131 |
| 1993 | (Taiwan) Huang Ping-yang (黃平洋) | Wei Chuan Dragons | 184 |
| 1994 | (United States) William Flynt (威爾W.F.) | Jungo Bears | 200 |
| 1995 | (Dominican Republic) José Núñez (王 漢J.N.) | Uni-President Lions | 183 |
| 1996 | (United States) Michael Garcia (賈 西M.G.) | Wei Chuan Dragons | 167 |
| 1997 | (Panama) Enrique Burgos (瑞 奇E.B.) | Brother Elephants | 177 |
| 1998 | (Dominican Republic) Osvaldo Martínez (勇壯O.M.) | Sinon Bulls | 143 |
| 1999 | (United States) Mark Kiefer (楓 康M.K.) | Sinon Bulls | 155 |
| 2000 | (United States) Jonathan Hurst (風 神J.H.) | Brother Elephants | 139 |
| 2001 | (Japan) Yofu Tetsu (養父 鐵) | Brother Elephants | 166 |
| 2002 | (Taiwan) Song Chau-chi (宋肇基) | Chinatrust Whales | 183 |
| 2003 | (Dominican Republic) Osvaldo Martínez (勇 壯O.M.) | Sinon Bulls | 182 |
| 2004 | (Taiwan) Lin Ying-chieh (林英傑) | Macoto Cobras | 203 |
| 2005 | (Taiwan) Lin Ying-chieh (林英傑) | Macoto Cobras | 174 |
| 2006 | (Taiwan) Lin En-yu (林恩宇) | Macoto Cobras | 209 |
| 2007 | (United States) Joey Dawley (喬 伊J.D.) | Brother Elephants | 153 |
| 2008 | (Taiwan) Fu-Te Ni (倪福德) | Chinatrust Whales | 132 |
| 2009 | (Japan) Itsuki Shoda (正田 樹) | Sinon Bulls | 115 |
| 2010 | (Puerto Rico) Orlando Román (奧蘭多O.R.) | Brother Elephants | 142 |
| 2011 | (Puerto Rico) Orlando Román (奧蘭多O.R.) | Brother Elephants | 161 |
| 2012 | (United States) Matt DeSalvo (迪薩猛M.D.) | Lamigo Monkeys | 137 |
| 2013 | (United States) Mike Loree (雷 力M.L.) | Lamigo Monkeys | 152 |
| 2014 | (Taiwan) Huang Sheng-hsiung (黃勝雄) | EDA Rhinos | 119 |
| 2015 | (United States) Mike Loree(羅 力M.L.) | EDA Rhinos | 144 |
| 2016 | (United States) Bruce Billings (布魯斯B.B.) | Uni-President Lions | 172 |
| 2017 | (United States) Mike Loree (羅 力M.L.) | Fubon Guardians | 154 |
| 2018 | (United States) Mike Loree (羅 力M.L.) | Fubon Guardians | 157 |
| 2019 | (Dominican Republic) Radhames Liz (李 茲R.L.) | Lamigo Monkeys | 179 |
| 2020 | (Dominican Republic) José de Paula (德保拉J.D.) | CTBC Brothers | 192 |
| 2021 | (Dominican Republic) José de Paula (德保拉J.D.) | CTBC Brothers | 187 |
| 2022 | (Dominican Republic) José de Paula (德保拉J.D.) | CTBC Brothers | 162 |
| 2023 | (United States) Drew Gagnon (鋼 龍A.G.) | Wei Chuan Dragons | 155 |
| 2024 | (Venezuela) Mario Sanchez (勝騎士 M.S.) | Uni-President 7-Eleven Lions | 167 |
| 2025 | (Dominican Republic) Pedro Fernandez (威能帝 P.F.) | Rakuten Monkeys | 168 |
| 2026 | (United States) John Gant (蔣 銲J.G.) | Wei Chuan Dragons | 136 |
