= Kuo Tai-yuan =

Taiwanese baseball player (born 1962)

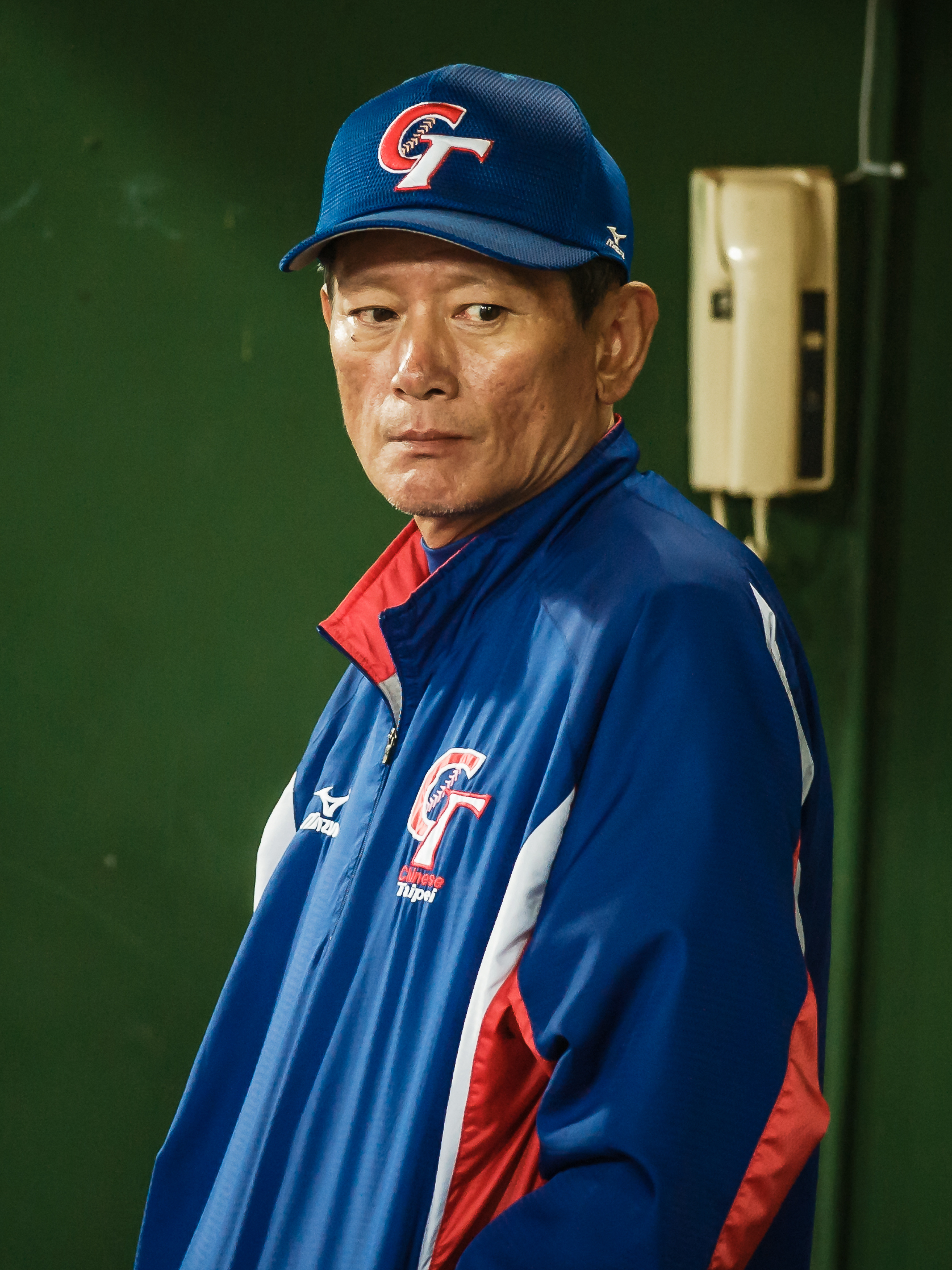
- Kuo in 2017
- Pitcher
- Born: March 20, 1962 (age 64); Tainan City, Taiwan
- Batted: Right Threw: Right

NPB debut
- 8 April, 1985, for the Seibu Lions

Last NPB appearance
- 5 October, 1997, for the Seibu Lions

NPB statistics
- Win–loss record: 117–68
- Earned run average: 3.16
- Strikeouts: 1,069
- Stats at Baseball Reference

Teams
- Seibu Lions (1985–1997)

Career highlights and awards
- Pacific League MVP (1991); 2x NPB All-Star (1990, 1995)

Kuo Tai-yuan (Chinese: 郭泰源; pinyin: Guō Tàiyuán; Wade–Giles: Kuo^{1} Tai^{4} Yüan^{2}; Japanese: かく たいげん (Kaku Taigen); born 20 March 1962) is a Taiwanese former professional baseball pitcher who played in Nippon Professional Baseball (NPB). He is currently a baseball coach.

With 117 wins accumulated during his 13 seasons pitching for the Seibu Lions, Kuo set the record of being the international player who achieved the most wins in NPB history, and is widely regarded as the greatest Taiwanese pitcher before Chien-Ming Wang (Kuo, Hong-Chih Kuo and Chin-Lung Hu are Tainan City natives).

== Career ==
=== Amateur ===
Kuo was born in Tainan City, Taiwan. Originally a shortstop, he started to pitch in high school and immediately became well known for his high quality fastball and slider. In the 1983 Chinese Taipei versus South Korea match in Asian Baseball Championship, Kuo did not allow a run to score during 17 consecutive innings, while his fastballs clocked up to 154 km/h (96 mph). He finally won the game and helped Chinese Taipei qualify for the 1984 Summer Olympics.

In the 1984 Olympics preliminary round against the United States, Kuo pitched up to 158 km/h (98 mph) and allowed only 2 runs (one earned run) during his complete game effort, earning the nickname "The Oriental Express". However, Chinese Taipei eventually lost to Team USA, which was studded with Will Clark, Mark McGwire, and the like. Kuo later pitched in the semifinal round against Japan, allowing one run in 4.2 innings. Kuo's excellent performance drew special attention from the Seibu Lions, and he signed with the club after the 1984 Summer Olympics.

=== Seibu Lions ===
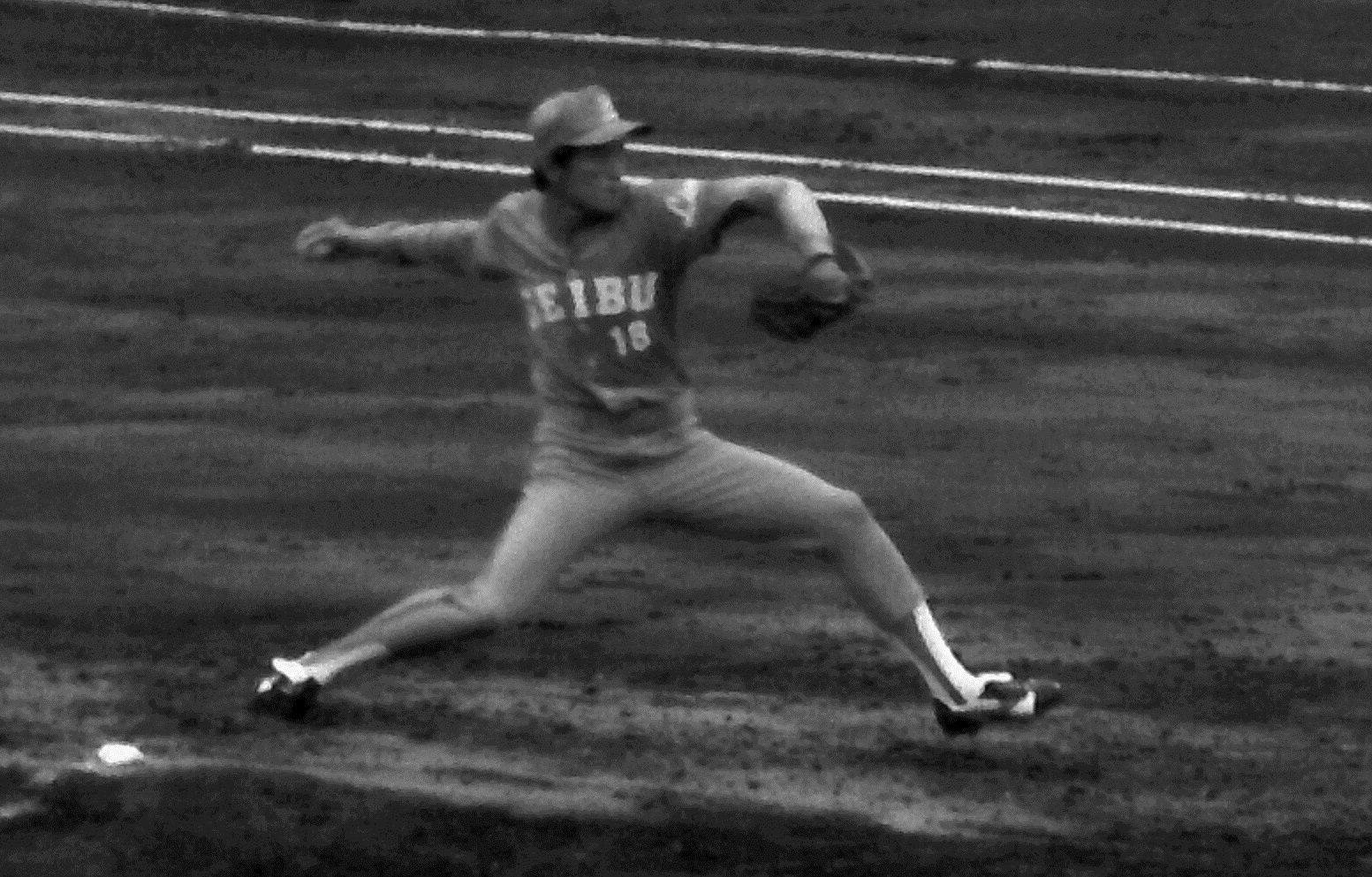
Kuo with Seibu Lions in 1990

As a rookie, Kuo immediately gained a position in Seibu Lion's starting rotation and no-hit the Nippon Ham Fighters on June 4, 1985, less than 2 months after his debut, and is the first international player to achieve so in the Pacific League history. Kuo's other notable achievements during his NPB career included:

- A streak of 10 consecutive wins during the 1989 season
- A streak of 9 consecutive complete games, and was elected as the most valuable player of the Pacific League in the 1991 season
- A streak of 3 consecutive shutouts in the 1992 season
- Highest winning percentage in the 1988 and 1994 seasons

Career Statistics:

Year	Club	Games	IP	W	L	Saves	Complete Games	Shutouts	Walk	K	Earned Run	ERA
1985	Seibu Lions	15	117.2	9	5	0	9	3	52	75	33	2.52
1986	Seibu Lions	39	108.1	5	7	16	5	1	38	105	35	2.91
1987	Seibu Lions	22	158	13	4	0	11	2	40	81	53	3.02
1988	Seibu Lions	19	149.1	13	3	1	15	1	23	76	40	2.41
1989	Seibu Lions	26	198.1	10	10	0	14	4	49	117	72	3.27
1990	Seibu Lions	18	119.1	9	4	0	5	1	44	84	47	3.54
1991	Seibu Lions	24	184.1	15	6	1	12	4	30	108	53	2.59
1992	Seibu Lions	23	168	14	4	0	9	3	44	108	45	2.41
1993	Seibu Lions	22	133.1	8	8	0	4	1	26	88	52	3.51
1994	Seibu Lions	27	130	13	5	0	4	2	55	86	72	4.98
1995	Seibu Lions	22	163	8	6	0	3	2	40	115	46	2.54
1996	Seibu Lions	14	52.1	0	6	0	1	0	23	26	43	7.39
1997	Seibu Lions	1	0.1	0	0	0	0	0	0	0	0	0.00
Total		272	1682.1	117	68	18	92	24	464	1069	591	3.16

Kuo retired at the end of 1997 season after he suffered long time wound which cost him a vacant season. Shortly after Kuo's retirement a poll in the Seibu Lions' official website unanimously voted Kuo as the most popular international player in the Seibu Lions history.

=== Professional Baseball in Taiwan ===
After retiring from Seibu Lions, the Taiwan Major League (TML) hired Kuo as "senior technical consultant" until the league's collapse in early 2003. Meantime he introduced his former Seibu teammates Takehiro Ishii and Hisanobu Watanabe to join TML, originally as players and later as coaches. He also acted as go-between to help then young Hsu Ming-Chieh and Chang Chih-chia join Seibu Lions, following his steps.

After a disappointing 2003 in which he was temporarily jobless and suffered marital crisis (as revealed in the "Personal Life" section later), in 2004 he started to head coach the Macoto Cobras until the end of 2005 season. During his 2 seasons with the Cobras Kuo accumulated a 93 wins, 97 losses, and 17 ties performance. In the 2005 Taiwan Series the Cobras were swept by the Sinon Bulls 0-4 and Kuo resigned right after the fiasco, addressing that "I would like to spend more time with my family". He later introduced Macoto Cobras players Lin En-yu and Lin Ying-Chieh to join Tohoku Rakuten Golden Eagles.

=== Chinese Taipei national baseball team ===
On February 15, 2007, Kuo was appointed as the head coach of the Chinese Taipei national baseball team by the Chinese Taipei Baseball Association. His tasks included the 2007 Baseball World Cup and 2007 Asian Baseball Championships. However the Chinese Taipei national baseball team performed poorly in both tournaments and he was relieved from the post on December 15, 2007.

== Basic Information ==
- Number: 12 (1984~86), 18 (1987~97), 88 (since 2004)
- Height: 180 cm
- Weight: 72 kg
- Bats/throws: R/R

== Personal life ==
Kuo married Taiwanese model and actress Chang Chiung-tzu (張瓊姿, also credited as Zhang Qiuzi by Chinese media) in December 1993. After their marriage, Chang temporarily gave up her acting career in Taiwan to live with Kuo in Japan until his retirement late in 1997. Together, they had two daughters, born in 1997 and 1999.
