= CTBA =

CTBA may refer to:

- California Thoroughbred Breeders Association, a non-profit organization located in California, United States
- Chinese Taipei Baseball Association, the national baseball association of Taiwan
- Chinese Taipei Basketball Association, the national basketball association of Taiwan
- Cuatro Torres Business Area, a business park located in Madrid, Spain
- Cricket Training Balls Australia, a business located in Gold Coast, Australia
- Central Texas Beekeepers Association, A beekeeping association promoting education about honey bees and beekeeping. Monthly meetings held in Brenham, Texas, United States
- The Chronic Tuberculosis Alliance, a charitable organization located in Kildare, Ireland
