= Fu-Te Ni =

Taiwanese baseball player (born 1982)

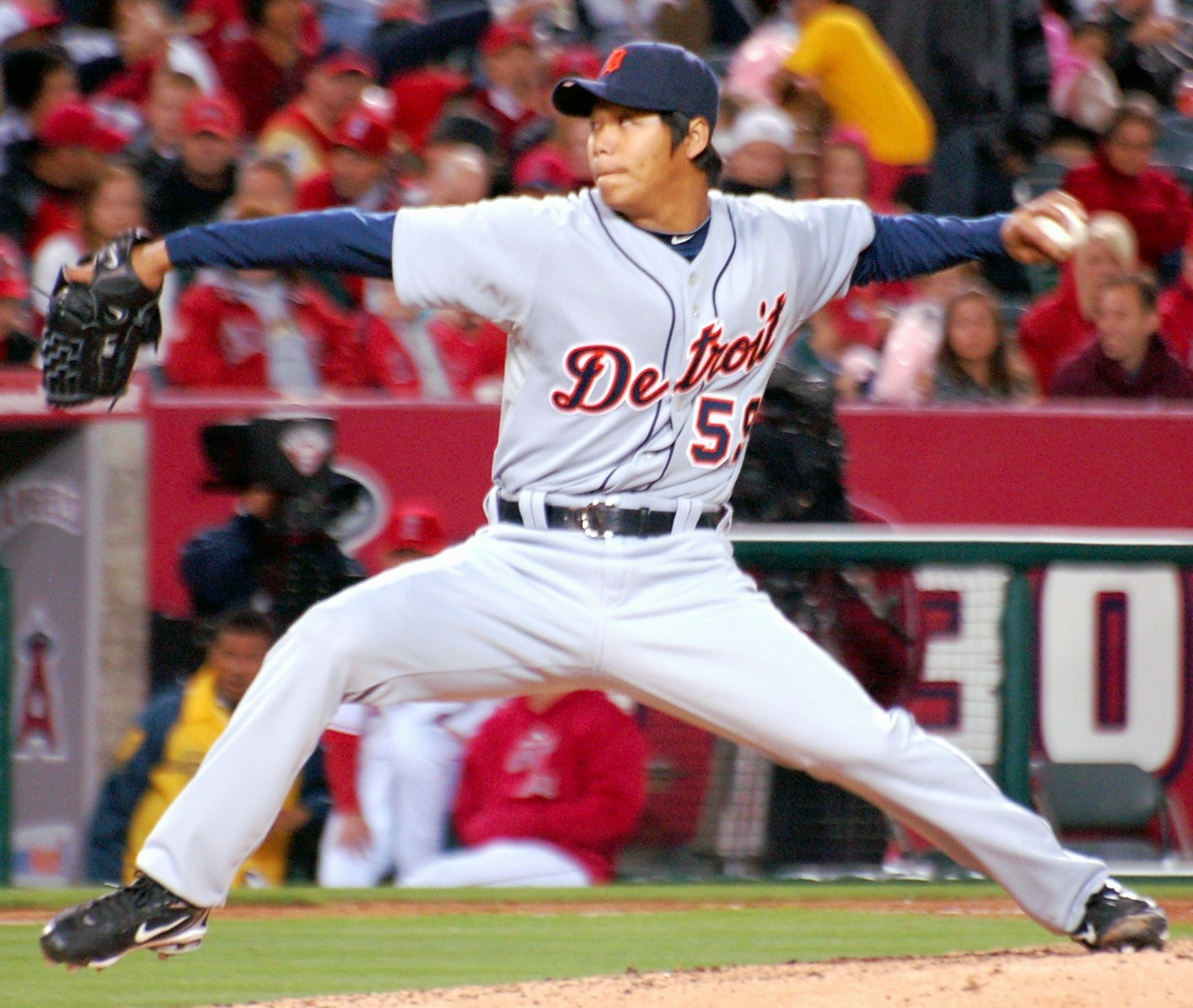
- Ni with the Detroit Tigers in 2010

ANYO Fresh – No. 36
- Pitching coach
- Born: 14 November 1982 (age 43); Pingtung County, Taiwan
- Batted: Left Threw: Left

Professional debut
- CPBL: March 18, 2007, for the Chinatrust Whales
- MLB: June 29, 2009, for the Detroit Tigers

Last appearance
- CPBL: May 22, 2021, for the CTBC Brothers
- MLB: June 29, 2010, for the Detroit Tigers

MLB statistics
- Win–loss record: 0–1
- Earned run average: 4.33
- Strikeouts: 43

CPBL statistics
- Win–loss record: 25-40
- ERA: 4.00
- Strikeouts: 482
- WHIP: 1.34
- Stats at Baseball Reference

Teams
- As player: Chinatrust Whales (2007–2008); Detroit Tigers (2009–2010); EDA Rhinos/Fubon Guardians (2015–2020); CTBC Brothers (2021); As coach: ANYO Fresh (2021–present)

Career highlights and awards
- Taiwan Series champion (2016)

Fu-Te Ni
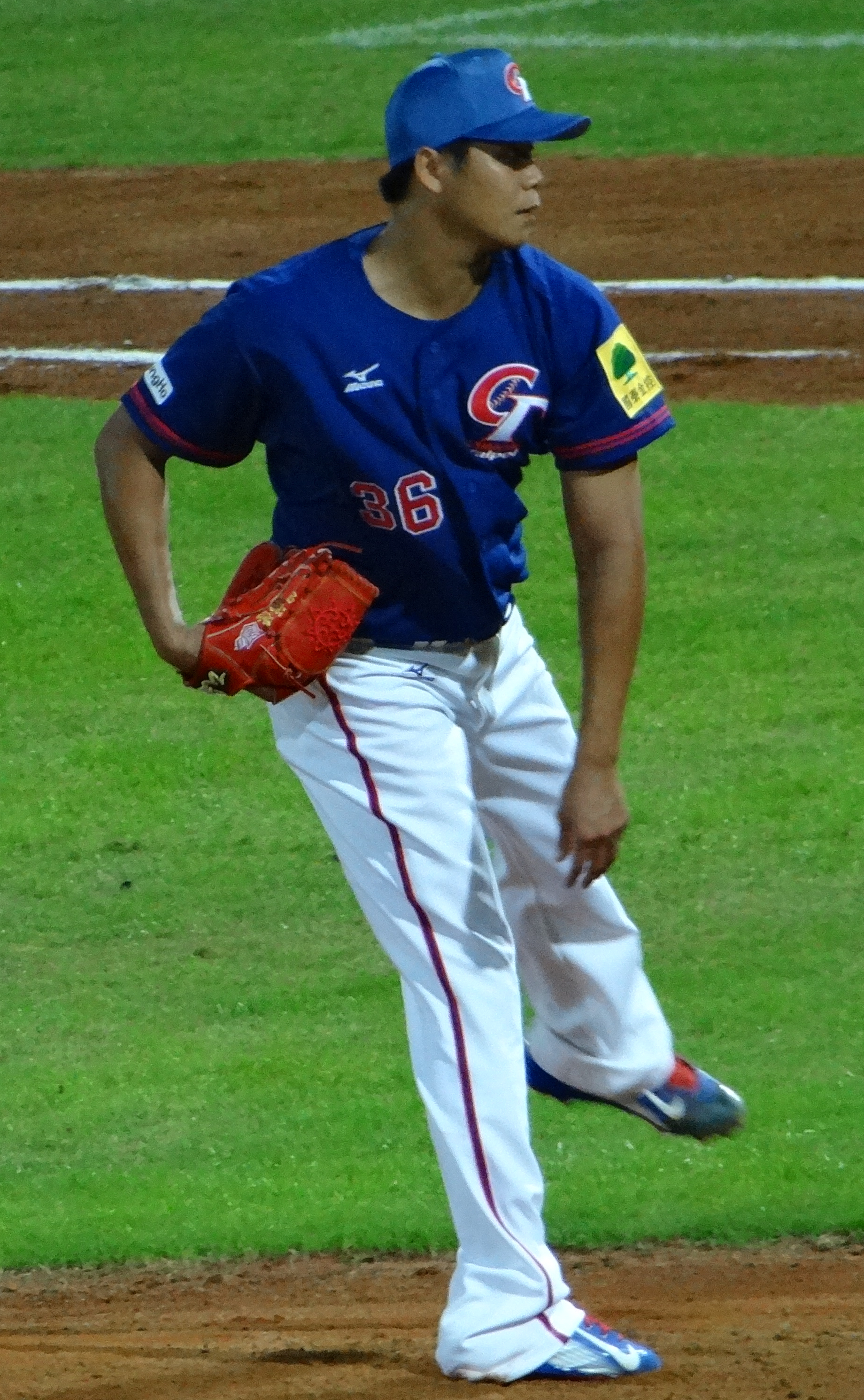
- Ni pitching for the Chinese Taipei national team in 2015 WBSC Premier12 warm-up game
- Chinese: 倪福德
- Hanyu Pinyin: Ní Fúdé
Transcriptions
Standard Mandarin
- Hanyu Pinyin: Ní Fúdé
- Wade–Giles: Ni Fu-Te
- IPA: [nǐ fǔtɤ̌]
Southern Min
- Hokkien POJ: Gê Hok-tek

Fu-Te Ni (born 14 November 1982), nicknamed "Tudigong", is a former Taiwanese professional baseball pitcher, who is currently the pitching coach for ANYO Fresh, an amateur team in Taiwan. He played in the Chinese Professional Baseball League (CPBL) for the Chinatrust Brothers, EDA Rhinos/Fubon Guardians, and CTBC Brothers, and in Major League Baseball (MLB) for the Detroit Tigers.

Drafted by the Whales, Ni played the 2007 and 2008 seasons until the team was disbanded on November 11, 2008. He signed a minor league contract with the Tigers in 2009. Ni was called up to the Major Leagues in June 2009, becoming the sixth Taiwanese player to enter Major League Baseball. He is also the first player to transition from the CPBL to MLB. Ni made his major league debut on June 29, 2009, against the Oakland Athletics.

== Playing career ==
=== Chinatrust Whales ===
Ni was drafted by the CPBL team Chinatrust Whales in 2005. He signed with the team in early 2007 and played for the entire CPBL 2007 and 2008 seasons. In the two years Ni had a 12–24 record with seven holds, four saves and a 3.43 ERA in 267 2/3 inning pitched. Ni won the CPBL strikeout Champion Award in 2008 season with 132 strikeouts.

=== Detroit Tigers ===
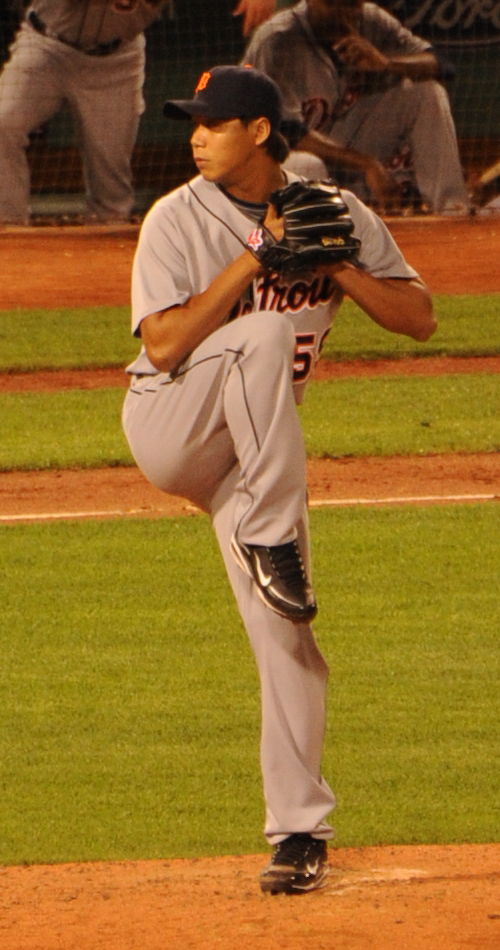
Ni with the Detroit Tigers in 2009

Ni signed as a free agent with the Detroit Tigers on January 13, 2009. He was assigned to the Triple-A Toledo Mud Hens of the International League. In 24 games with the Mud Hens, Ni went 3–0 with a 2.60 ERA, and 32 strikeouts. Ni was called up on June 28, 2009, to replace the injured Nate Robertson. Ni is the sixth Taiwanese player to enter Major League Baseball, and the fourth pitcher. He made his debut on June 29, 2009, against the Oakland Athletics, allowing one run in 1 2/3 innings with 3 strikeouts. The first major league batter he faced was slugger Jason Giambi, and Ni struck him out. Ni pitched 36 games with the Tigers in 2009 and compiled no wins or losses with a 2.61 ERA and 21 strikeouts.

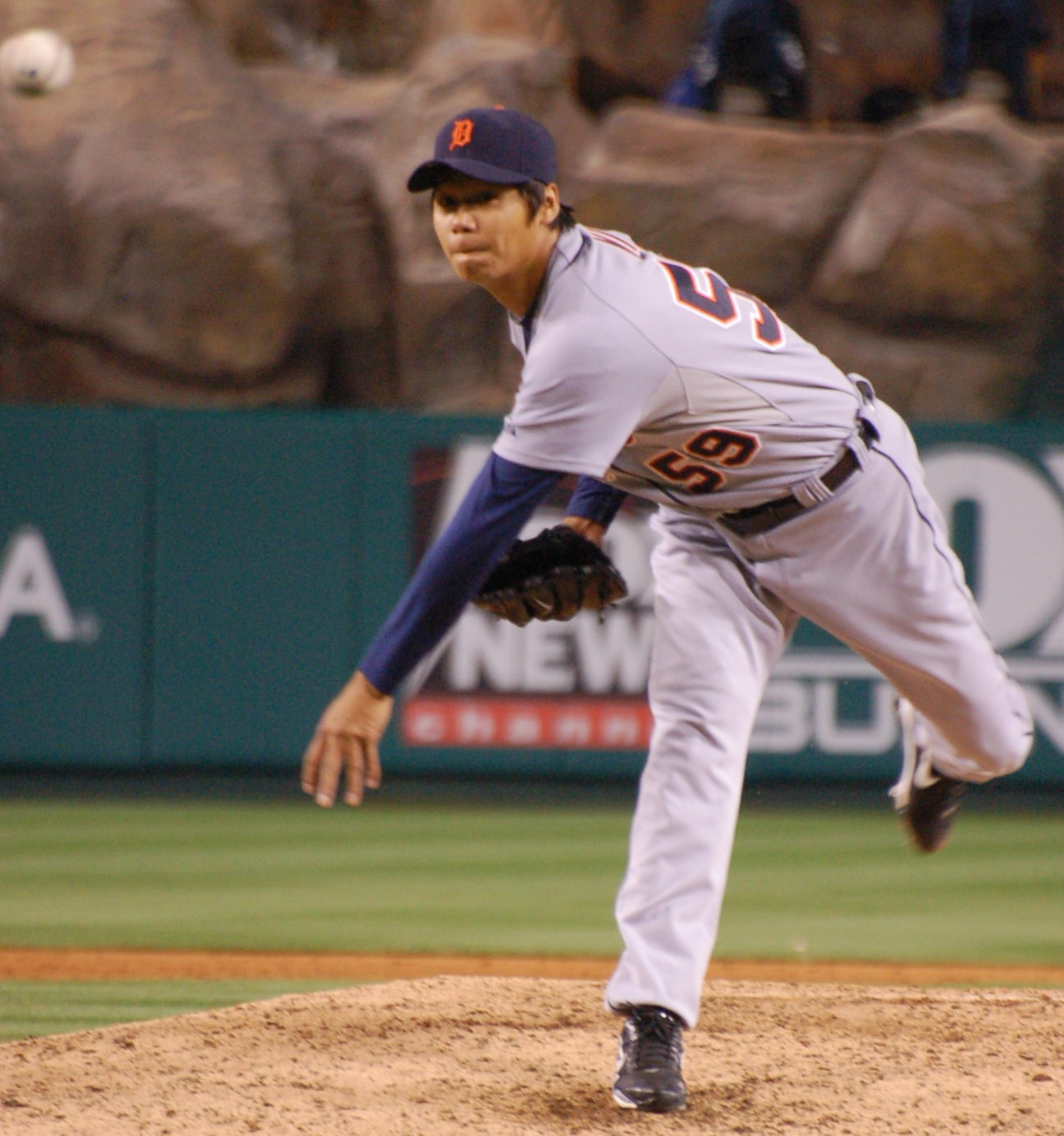
Ni with the Detroit Tigers in 2010

After accumulating a 6.65 ERA in 2010, Ni was optioned to the back to the Mud Hens on June 30, 2010. On November 24, Ni was removed from the 40-man roster and sent outright to Toledo.

In February 2011 the Tigers listed him as a non-roster invitee to spring training camp. On March 22, he was assigned to the Mud Hens. He was 6–3 with a 3.24 ERA in 34 games (including 12 starts). Ni was released by the Tigers on August 7, 2012, after he was 2–2 with a 4.56 ERA in 7 games (5 starts) during the 2012 season.

=== Los Angeles Dodgers ===
After not playing during the 2013 season, Ni was signed by the Los Angeles Dodgers to a minor league contract on December 13, 2013. However, he was released prior to the start of the season on March 31, 2014.

=== Lancaster Barnstormers ===
On April 30, 2014, Ni signed with the Lancaster Barnstormers of the Atlantic League of Professional Baseball. In 24 games for Lancaster, he struggled to an 0–1 record and 6.14 ERA with 25 strikeouts across 22 innings of relief.

=== Camden Riversharks ===
On July 10, 2014, Ni was traded to the Camden Riversharks of the Atlantic League. In 11 starts for Camden, he logged a 2–5 record and 4.72 ERA with 58 strikeouts across 61 innings pitched. Ni was released by the Riversharks on September 8.

On January 28, 2015, Ni re-signed with the Riversharks. In 7 starts for Camden, he posted a 2–1 record and 3.38 ERA with 30 strikeouts across 40 innings of work. Ni was released by the team on May 31.

=== Fubon Guardians ===
On June 30, 2015, Ni signed with the Fubon Guardians of the CPBL. After the 2020 season, he elected free agency.

=== CTBC Brothers ===
Ni signed a one-month contract with the CTBC Brothers of the Chinese Professional Baseball League for the 2021 season. After failing to secure a contract extension, Ni left the team without playing in a game on May 24, 2021.

== International career ==
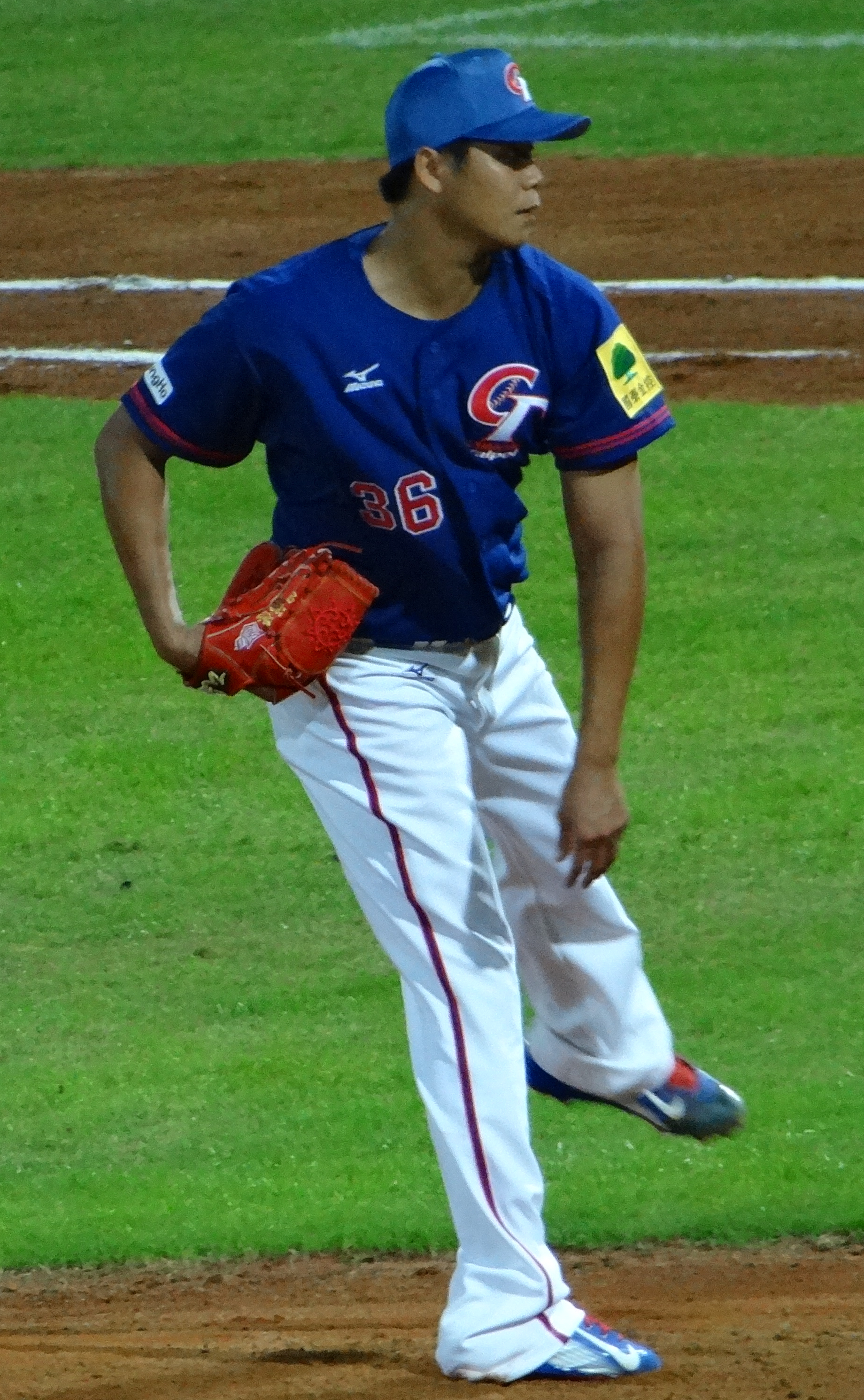
Ni in 2015

Ni selected Chinese Taipei national baseball team at the 2008 Olympics, 2009 World Baseball Classic, 2013 exhibition games against Japan, 2015 WBSC Premier12, 2016 exhibition game against Japan and 2017 World Baseball Classic.

== Coaching career ==
Ni became the pitching coach for the amateur Popcorn League team ANYO Fresh on November 11, 2021.

== See also ==
- List of Major League Baseball players from Taiwan

Preceded by Joey Dawley	CPBL Strikeout Champion Award; 2008	Succeeded by Itsuki Shoda
