= Chin-Lung Hu =

Taiwanese baseball player (born 1984)

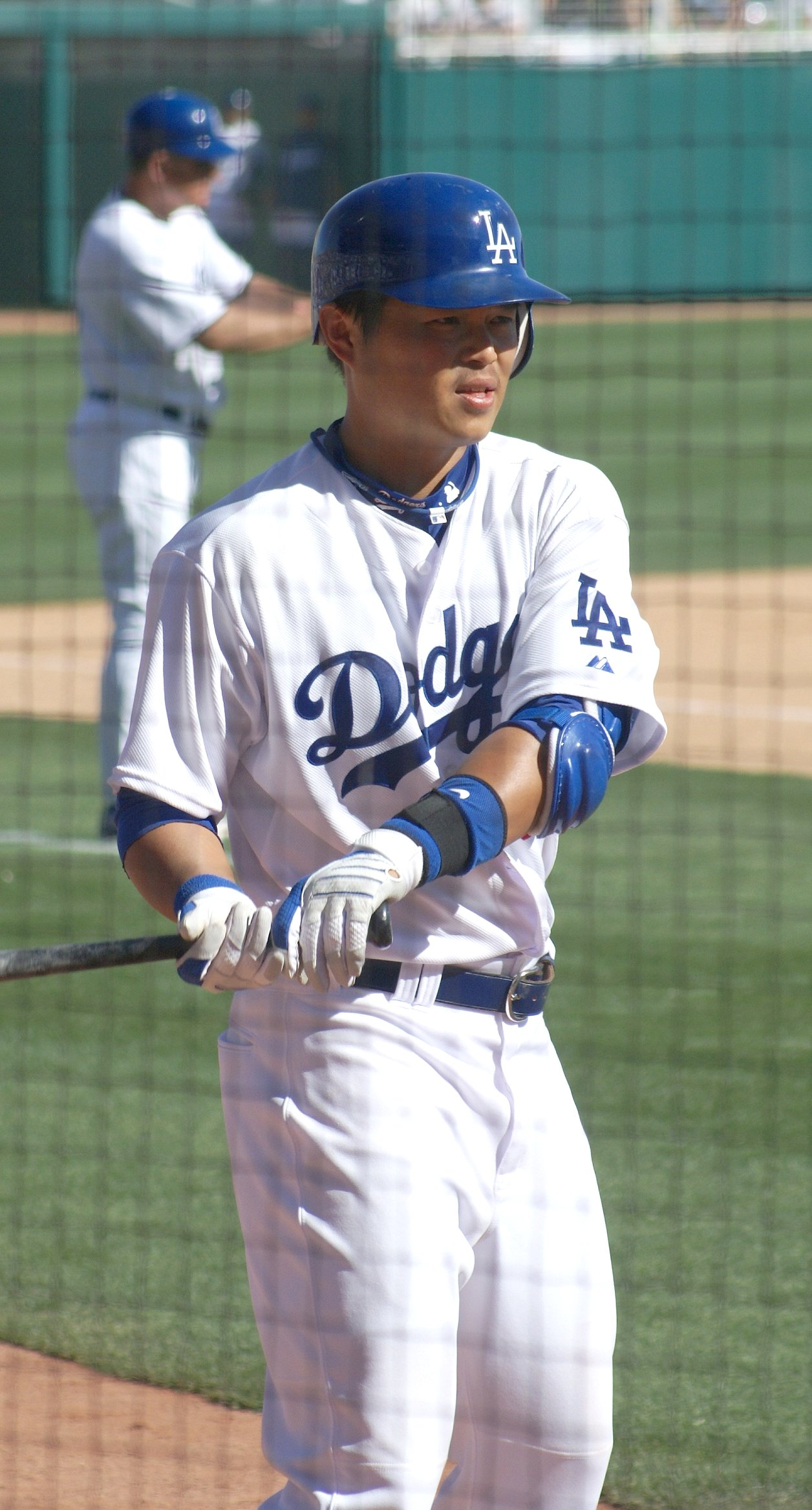
- Hu with the Los Angeles Dodgers
- Shortstop
- Born: February 2, 1984 (age 42); Tainan City, Taiwan
- Batted: Right Threw: Right

Professional debut
- MLB: September 1, 2007, for the Los Angeles Dodgers
- CPBL: March 24, 2013, for the EDA Rhinos

Last appearance
- MLB: May 16, 2011, for the New York Mets
- CPBL: September 20, 2025, for the Uni-President Lions

MLB statistics (through 2011 season)
- Batting average: .176
- Home runs: 2
- Runs batted in: 18

CPBL statistics (through 2025 season)
- Batting average: .344
- Hits: 1,260
- Home runs: 86
- Runs batted in: 555
- Stats at Baseball Reference

Teams
- Los Angeles Dodgers (2007–2010); New York Mets (2011); EDA Rhinos / Fubon Guardians (2013–2020); Uni-President Lions (2022–2025)

Career highlights and awards
- Taiwan Series champion (2016)
Medals
Representing Chinese Taipei
Men's baseball
Asian Games
Gold medal – first place	2006 Doha	Team
Silver medal – second place	2010 Guangzhou	Team
Asian Baseball Championship
Bronze medal – third place	2007 Taichung	Team
Silver medal – second place	2009 Sapporo	Team
World Junior Baseball Championship
Silver medal – second place	2002 Sherbrooke	Team

Chin-Lung Hu
- Traditional Chinese: 胡金龍
- Simplified Chinese: 胡金龙
Transcriptions
Standard Mandarin
- Hanyu Pinyin: Hú Jīnlóng
- IPA: [xǔ tɕínlʊ̌ŋ]
Southern Min
- Hokkien POJ: Hô͘ Kim-liông

Chin-Lung Hu (Chinese: 胡金龍; pinyin: Hú Jīnlóng; born February 2, 1984) is a Taiwanese former professional baseball shortstop. He has played in Major League Baseball (MLB) for the Los Angeles Dodgers and New York Mets, and in the Chinese Professional Baseball League (CPBL) for the EDA Rhinos/Fubon Guardians and the Uni-President Lions. He was the fifth player—and first infielder—from Taiwan to play in MLB. His last name (along with that of fellow Taiwanese Fu-Te Ni, formerly of the Detroit Tigers) is the shortest in MLB history.

== Professional career ==
=== Los Angeles Dodgers ===
Hu was signed by the Los Angeles Dodgers on January 31, 2003, and began his professional career with the rookie league Ogden Raptors in 2003. He split 2004 between the Columbus Catfish in A ball and the Vero Beach Dodgers in High-A ball. In 2005, he played the whole season at Vero Beach and hit .313 with 23 stolen bases.

In 2006, he played for the Double-A Jacksonville Suns. Hu played in the All-Star Futures Game during the All-Star break in both 2006 and 2007. He won the MVP award for his performance in the 2007 game.

He was promoted to Triple-A Las Vegas on July 12, 2007, and made his major league debut on September 1, 2007, against the San Diego Padres. In his second MLB at bat, Hu hit a solo home run against the San Diego Padres reliever Brett Tomko on September 11, 2007, against the Padres, becoming the first position player born in Taiwan to hit a home run in MLB. (Hu's teammate, pitcher Hong-Chih Kuo, had become the first Taiwanese-born player to hit a home run in MLB earlier in 2007).

On September 23, in a game against the Arizona Diamondbacks, Hu hit a single, prompting sportscaster Vin Scully to reference Baseball Hall of Fame inductees Abbott and Costello's famous "Who's on First?" comedy routine by announcing "I can finally say Hu's on first base."

On September 25, Hu hit a two-run homer against the Colorado Rockies' starting pitcher Ubaldo Jiménez and became the first Taiwanese-born player to hit two home runs. In 2008, Hu appeared in 65 games for the Dodgers, batting .181 in 116 plate appearances, with no home runs and nine runs batted in. The Dodgers advanced to the National League Championship Series but Hu was not included on any postseason roster.

Hu spent most of 2009 in Triple-A with the Albuquerque Isotopes and appeared in only five games with the Dodgers after a September call-up. In 2010, he again spent most of the year with the Isotopes. He appeared in 14 games with the Dodgers in 2010 and got 3 hits in 23 at-bats.

=== New York Mets ===
On December 27, 2010, Hu was traded to the New York Mets in exchange for pitcher Michael Antonini. He collected just one hit in 20 at bats with the major league club. On May 17, 2011, Hu was removed from the 40-man roster and sent outright to the Triple-A Buffalo Bisons.

=== Southern Maryland Blue Crabs ===
After playing for the Adelaide Bite of the Australian Baseball League and starting shortstop for the World All-Stars at the 2011 Australian Baseball League All-Star Game, Hu signed a minor league contract with the Cleveland Indians in January, 2012. He was released on March 28, 2012, and signed to a minor league deal with the Philadelphia Phillies, however his contract was voided the next day after he failed a physical. He then signed with the Southern Maryland Blue Crabs for the 2012 season. In 50 games for the Blue Crabs, Hu slashed .296/.351/.402 with two home runs and 19 RBI.

=== EDA Rhinos/Fubon Guardians ===
In 2013, Hu signed with the EDA Rhinos of the Chinese Professional Baseball League. Hu was named captain of the team. On September 11, 2016, Hu hit two home runs as part of a CPBL record eight home runs hit by the Rhinos. Hu and the Rhinos won the 2016 Taiwan Series, before the team changed its name to the Fubon Guardians the next season.

While playing in the CPBL, Hu participated in the 2019 WBSC Premier12. On April 18, 2020, Hu became the 23rd and fastest player in CPBL history to reach 1,000 hits. He was demoted to the minor leagues on June 25, as a message posted on the messaging application Line suggested that Hu advocated for the firing of field manager Hong I-chung.

Hu did not appear in another game for Fubon and was non–tendered by the team on December 21, 2021.

=== Uni-President Lions ===
On January 4, 2022, Hu signed with the Uni-President Lions of the Chinese Professional Baseball League. Hu was selected to his seventh and final CPBL All-Star Game in 2025, which became the best-attended all-star contest in league history. In August, Hu formally announced his intention to retire at the end of the season. His final game was on September 20, 2025.

== International career ==
Hu was selected for Chinese Taipei national baseball team at the 2006 World Baseball Classic, 2006 Asian Games, 2010 Asian Games and 2017 World Baseball Classic.

He missed the 2009 World Baseball Classic and 2013 World Baseball Classic editions of the event due to injury.

== Gallery ==
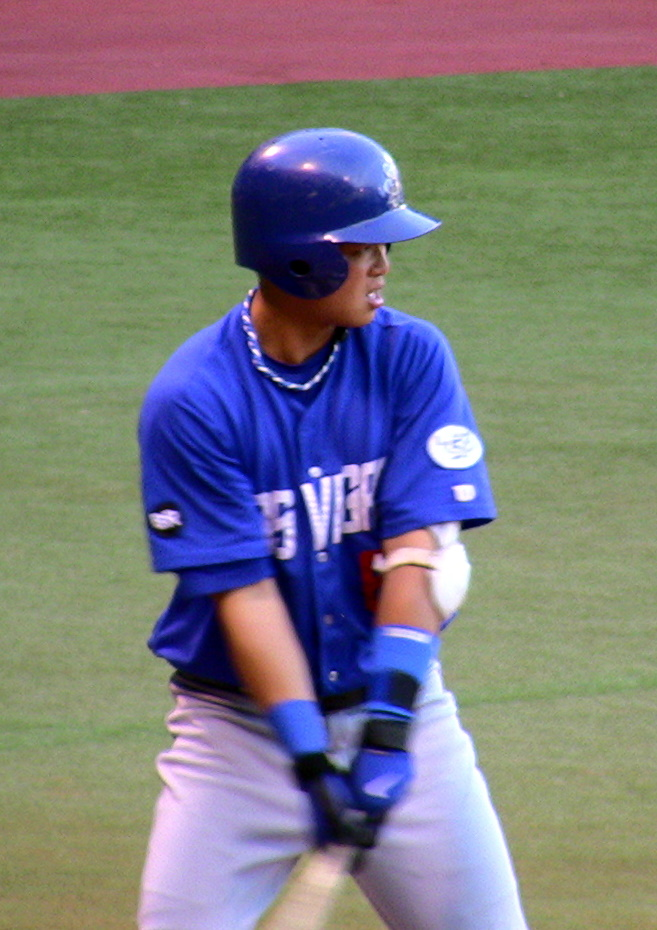
Hu batting in Portland in 2007

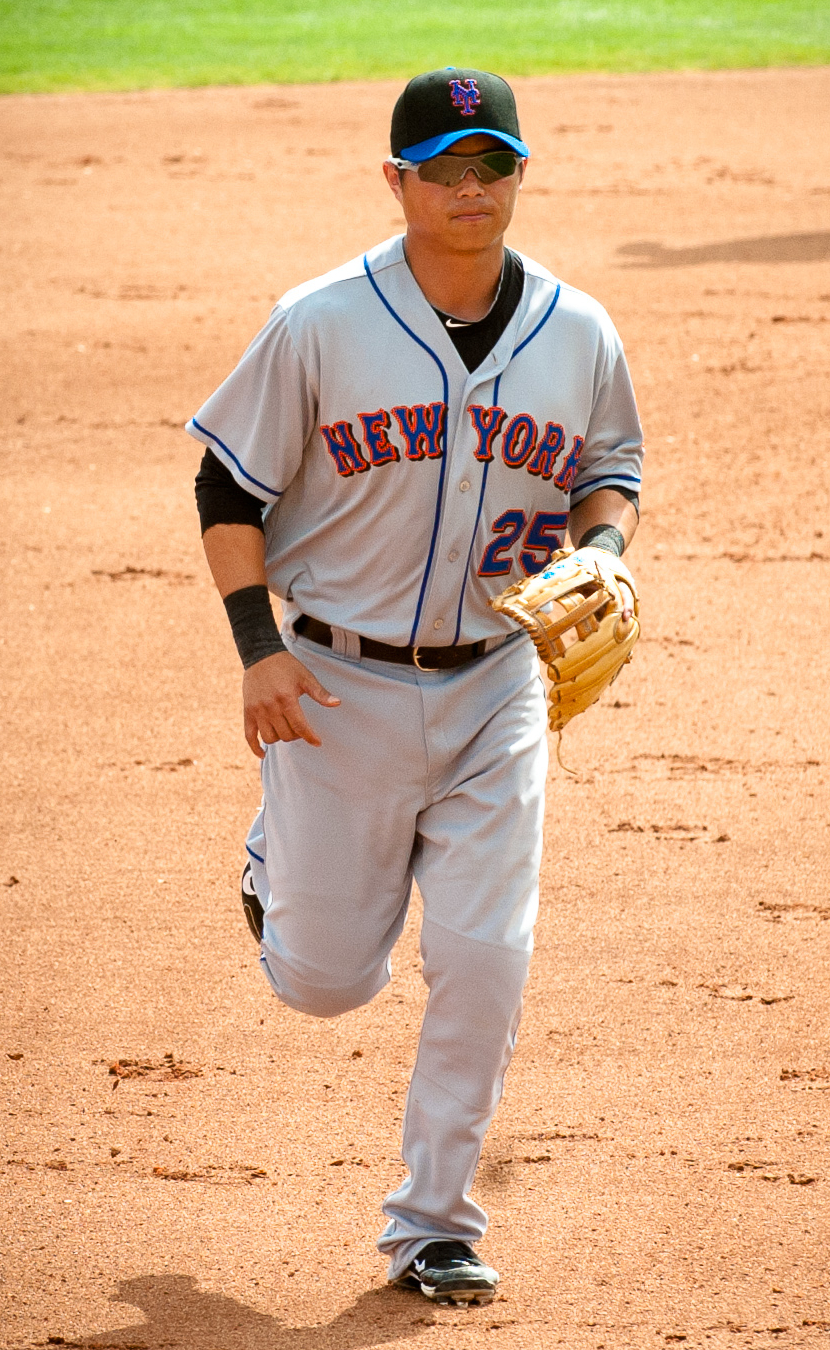
Hu with the New York Mets

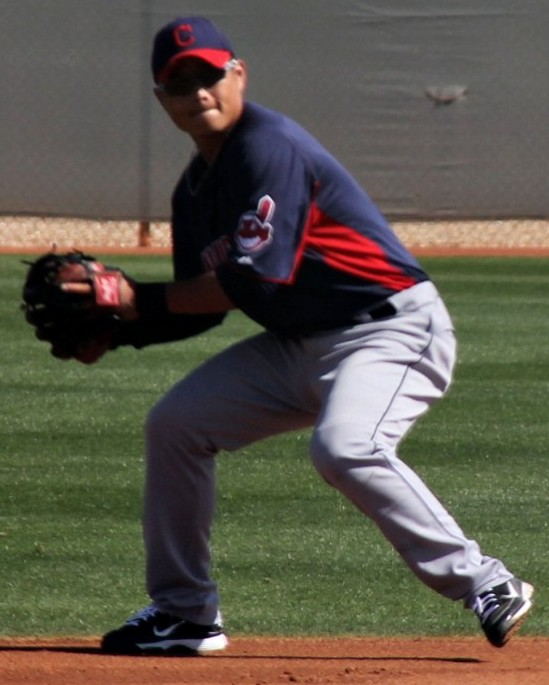
Hu fielding for the Cleveland Indians in 2012 spring training

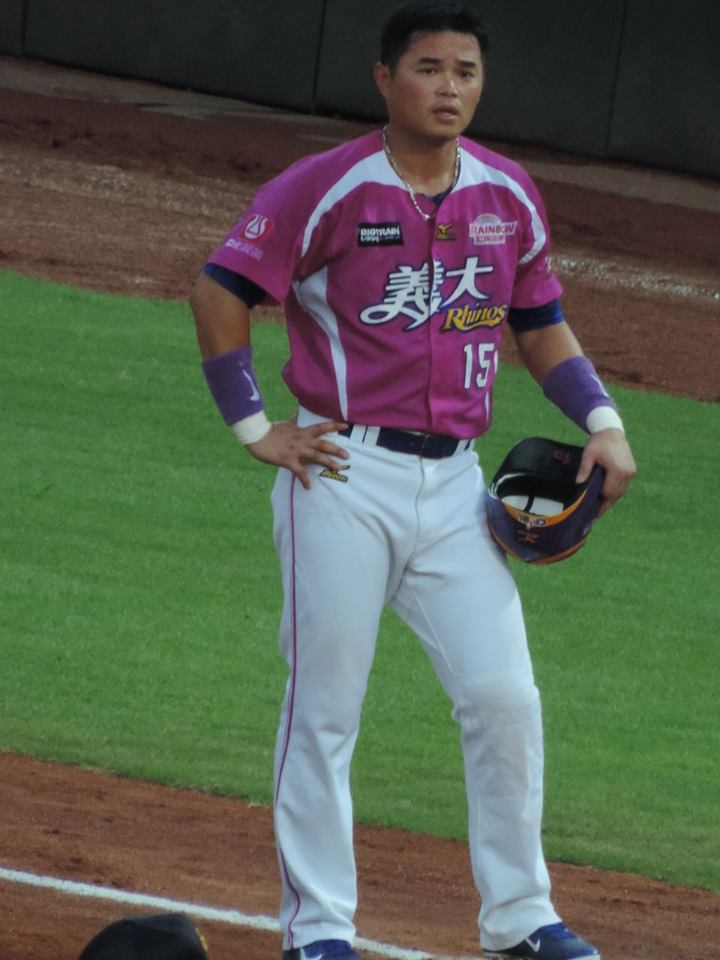
Hu with the EDA Rhinos

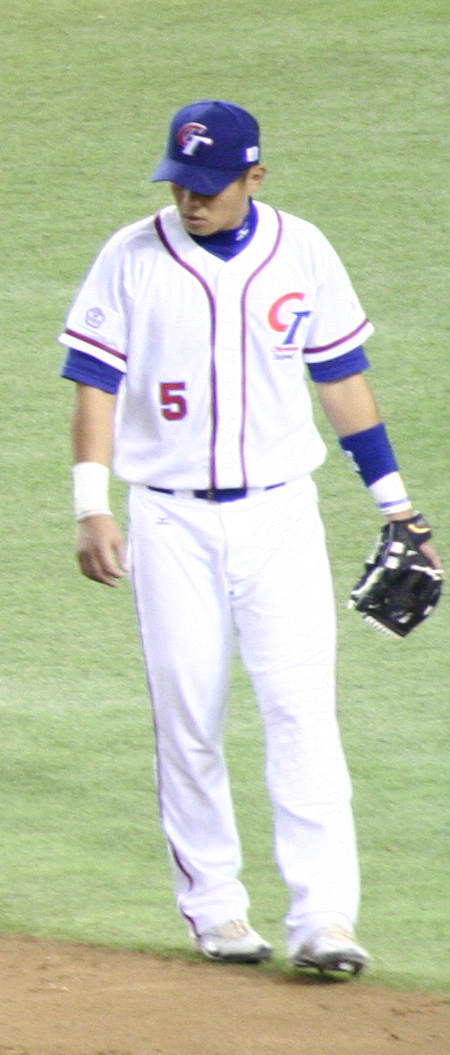
Hu with Chinese Taipei in the 2006 World Baseball Classic

== See also ==
- List of Major League Baseball players from Taiwan
