= WikiBaseball =

- Screenshot of WikiBaseball homepage
- Website type: Sports
- Available in: Traditional Chinese
- Owners: Department of Information and Library Science, Tamkang University
- Creator: Sinn-Cheng Lin
- Website: http://twbsball.dils.tku.edu.tw/
- Commercial: No
- Registration: Optional
- Launched: April 14, 2005

WikiBaseball
- Traditional Chinese: 臺灣棒球維基館
- Simplified Chinese: 台湾棒球维基馆
Transcriptions
Standard Mandarin
- Hanyu Pinyin: Táiwān Bàngqiú Wéijī Guǎn
- Wade–Giles: T'ai2 wan1 Pang4 ch'iu2 Wei2 chi1 Kuan3
- IPA: [tʰǎɪwán pâŋtɕʰjǒʊ wèɪtɕí kwàn]

WikiBaseball (Chinese: 臺灣棒球維基館) is a Taiwanese baseball website. It was created on April 14, 2005. Its major contents are people, event, time, place, and merchandise of Taiwanese baseball.

Wikibaseball runs on MediaWiki software. It is written collaboratively by volunteers. Besides feature story, all content is available under CC-BY-NC.

Because many people browse this website. United Daily News, Formosa Television and some Taiwan media introduce this website to Taiwanese people in March 2006. After several months, Wikibaseball teamed up with Chinese Taipei Baseball Association to digitize their relic. In addition, two Wikibaseball contributors contributed to Liberty Times and interviewed by Uonline reporter in March 2007.

== See also ==
- List of wikis
- Open content
- User-generated content
- Chinese Taipei Baseball Association
