= Wei-Chieh Huang =

Taiwanese baseball player (born 1993)

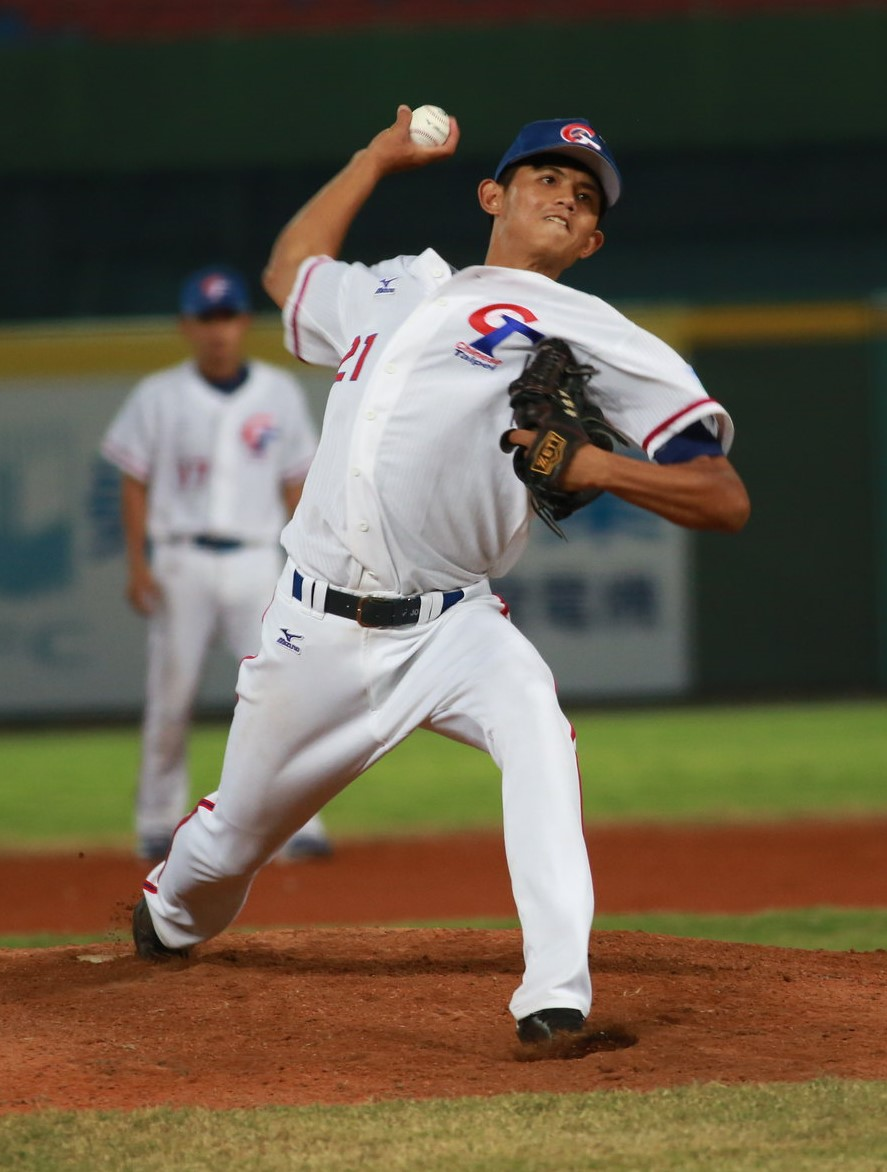
- Huang with Chinese Taipei

Wei Chuan Dragons – No. 14
- Pitcher
- Born: September 26, 1993 (age 32); Taitung, Taiwan
- Bats: Right Throws: Right

Professional debut
- MLB: April 23, 2019, for the Texas Rangers
- CPBL: September 7, 2025, for the Wei Chuan Dragons

MLB statistics (through 2019 season)
- Win–loss record: 0–0
- Earned run average: 3.18
- Strikeouts: 2

CPBL statistics (through 2025 season)
- Win–loss record: 0–1
- Earned run average: 7.88
- Strikeouts: 8
- Stats at Baseball Reference

Teams
- Texas Rangers (2019); Wei Chuan Dragons (2025–present)

Wei-Chieh Huang (Chinese: 黃暐傑; pinyin: Huáng Wěijié; born September 26, 1993) is a Taiwanese professional baseball pitcher for the Wei Chuan Dragons of the Chinese Professional Baseball League (CPBL). He has previously played in Major League Baseball (MLB) for the Texas Rangers.

== Career ==
Huang graduated from Kao-Yuan Vocational High School of Technology and Commerce in Kaohsiung and attended the National Taiwan University of Physical Education and Sport.

=== Arizona Diamondbacks ===
In 2014, he signed with the Arizona Diamondbacks as an international free agent. In 2015, Huang made his professional debut with the Kane County Cougars and spent the whole season there, posting a 7–3 record and 2.00 ERA in 15 games (12 starts). Huang was chosen to represent the Diamondbacks at the 2015 All-Star Futures Game. He spent 2016 with both the Visalia Rawhide, where he pitched to a 1–1 record and 6.49 ERA in six games started, and the Hillsboro Hops where he posted a 2–2 record and 5.34 ERA in nine games. In 2017, he spent time with both the Kane County Cougars and Visalia, pitching to a combined 2–1 record and 1.81 ERA in 64.2 total innings between both teams. Huang split the majority of his 2018 season between the Rawhide and the Jackson Generals.

=== Texas Rangers ===
The Diamondbacks traded Huang and Joshua Javier to the Texas Rangers in exchange for Jake Diekman on July 31, 2018. Huang was assigned to the Frisco RoughRiders after the trade. In a combined 38 games (two starts) between Visalia, Jackson, and Frisco, Huang posted a 7–3 record with a 3.33 ERA and 103 strikeouts in 78 innings. The Rangers added him to their 40-man roster after the 2018 season.

In 2019, Huang split the minor league season between Frisco, the rookie-level Arizona League Rangers, and Triple-A Nashville Sounds, going a combined 2–2 with a 4.74 ERA over 43 2/3 innings. On April 23, he was called up to the major league roster for the first time. He made his major league debut that night, pitching 2 1/3 innings in relief. Huang appeared in four games for Texas during his rookie campaign, recording a 3.18 ERA with two strikeouts in 5 2/3 innings. On December 2, 2019, Huang was non-tendered by Texas and became a free agent. He re-signed with Texas on a minor league contract on December 5.

On August 8, 2020, Huang was released by the Rangers organization and subsequently signed with the Auckland Tuatara.

In September 2021, Huang signed with the Adelaide Giants.

=== San Francisco Giants ===
On February 2, 2022, Huang signed a minor league contract with the San Francisco Giants organization. He made 27 appearances (16 starts) split between the rookie-level Arizona League Giants and Triple-A Sacramento River Cats, posting a cumulative 3-2 record and 3.99 ERA with 101 strikeouts over 79 innings of work.

=== Pittsburgh Pirates ===
On December 7, 2022, Huang was claimed by the Pittsburgh Pirates in the minor league phase of the Rule 5 draft. He did not appear in a game for the organization before electing free agency following the season on November 6, 2023. On December 13, 2023, Huang re–signed with the Pirates on a minor league contract. On September 15, 2024, Huang's agency confirmed that the Pirates had released him. He missed playing time during both seasons due to injury.

=== Wei Chuan Dragons ===
In 2025, Huang returned to Taiwan and was the only overseas player to register for the Chinese Professional Baseball League draft. He was subsequently selected third overall by the Wei Chuan Dragons.

== See also ==
- List of Major League Baseball players from Taiwan
- Rule 5 draft results
