= Taiwan Cooperative Bank =

Taiwanese bank

Taiwan Cooperative Bank 合作金庫銀行
- Company type: Public
- Traded as: TWSE: 5854
- Industry: Banking
- Founded: 1923 (Japanese Taiwan); 5 October 1946 (reorganized)
- Headquarters: Taipei, Taiwan
- Key people: Teh-Nan Hsu (chairman)
- Products: Financial services
- Revenue: ▲NTD 91.20 billion (2023)
- Net income: ▲NTD 16.3 billion (2023)
- Total assets: ▲NTD 4.25 trillion (2022)
- Number of employees: 7,849 (2022)
- Website: tcb-bank.com.tw

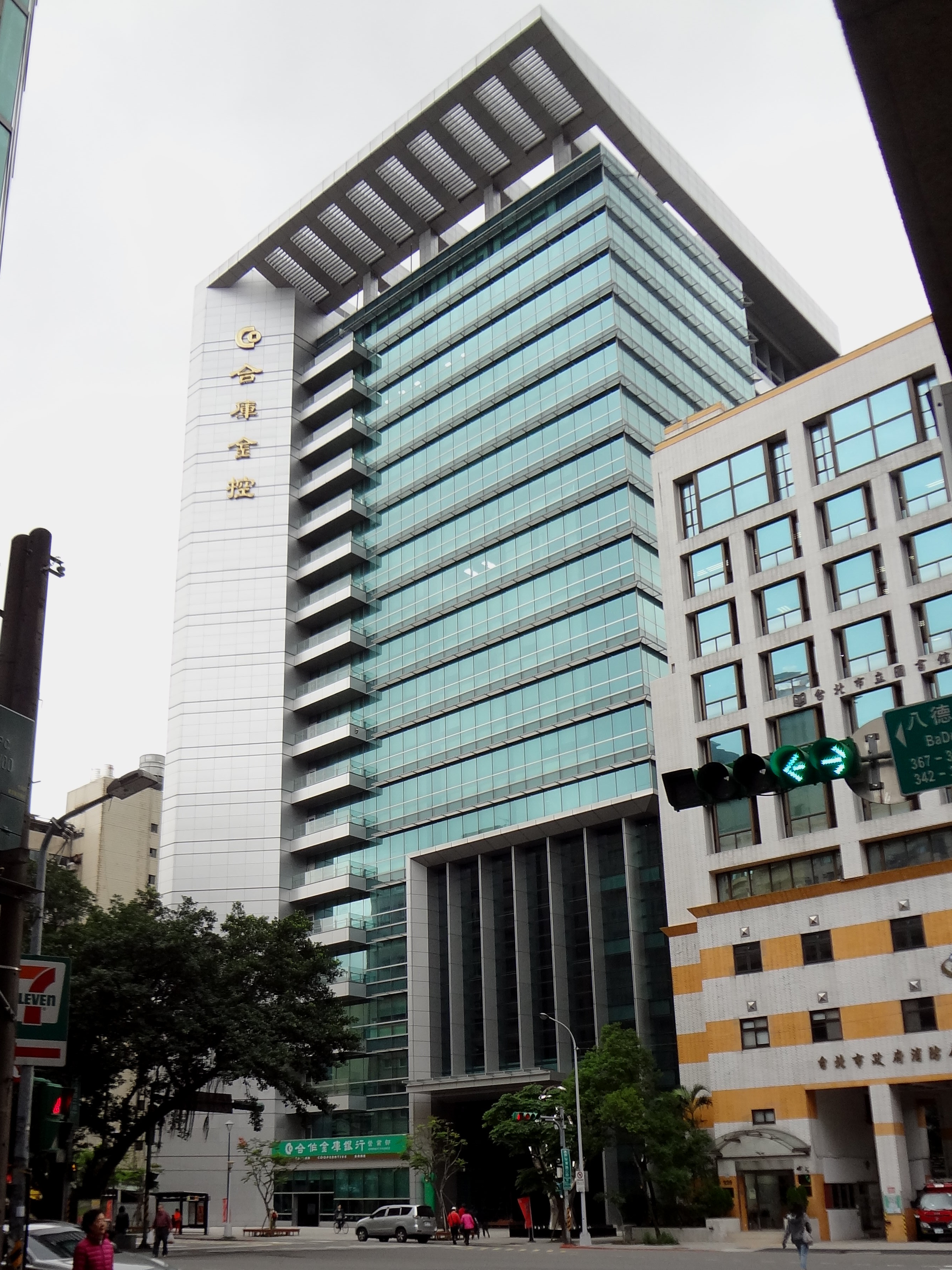
The headquarters of Taiwan Cooperative Bank in Zhonglun, Songshan District, Taipei

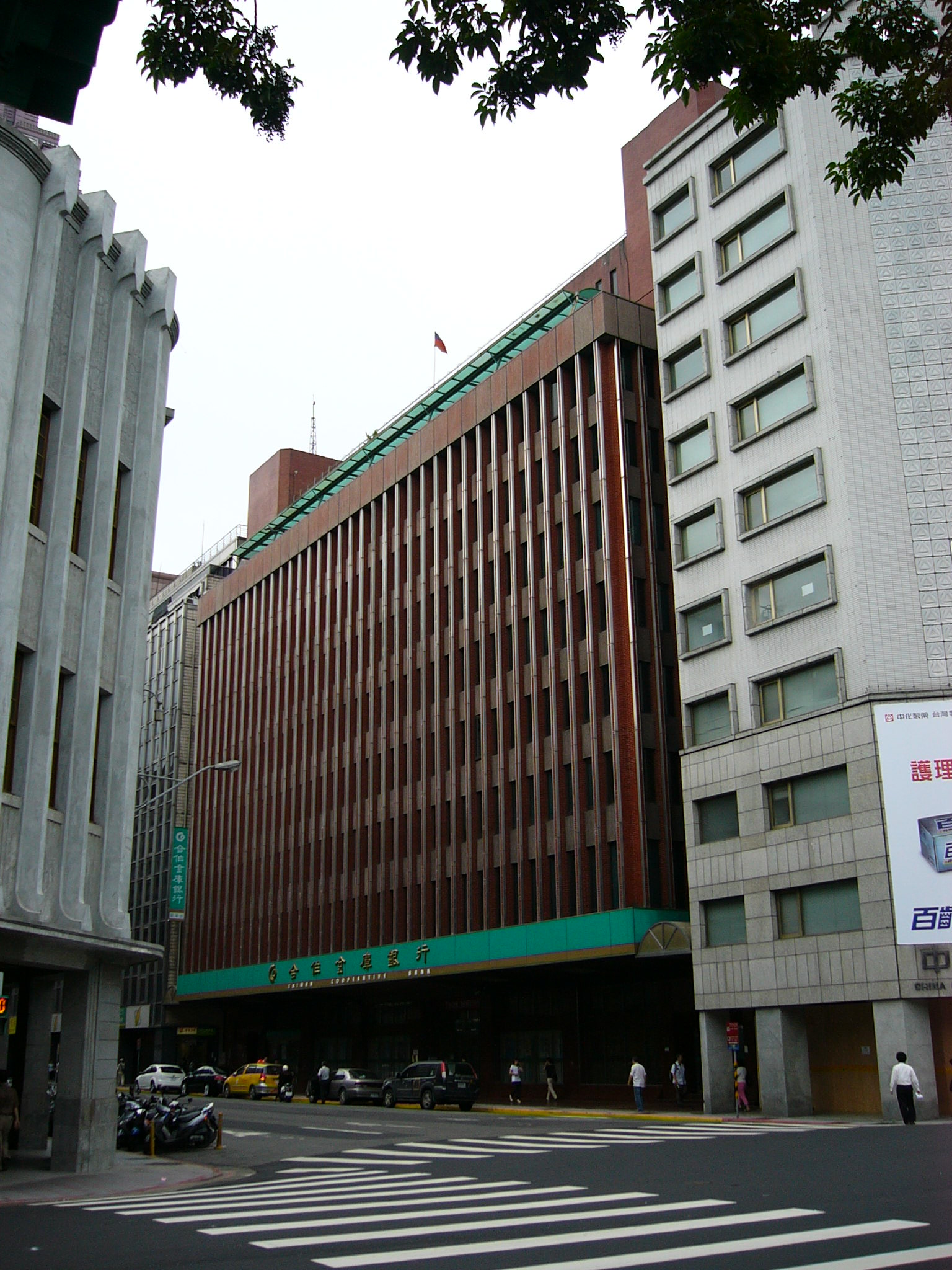
The former headquarters building until 2017, in Zhongzheng District, Taipei

The Taiwan Cooperative Bank (TCB; Chinese: 合作金庫銀行; pinyin: Hézuò Jīnkù Yínháng; Pe̍h-ōe-jī: Ha̍p-chok Kim-khò͘ Gîn-hâng) is a publicly listed bank headquartered in Taipei, Taiwan. Originally established in 1923 during Japanese rule in Taiwan, TCB was reorganized in 1946 and has grown significantly since. Today, it is one of the largest banks in Taiwan and has the most branches (301) among Taiwanese banks. Taiwan Cooperative Bank is one of Taiwan's six domestic systemically important banks.

== History ==
The bank was first established in 1923 as an alliance of about 290 credit unions in Taiwan.

In 2009, BNP Paribas announced a joint venture with TCB to sell insurance products in Taiwan. The following year, BNP announced another joint venture with TCB to set up an asset management operation in Taiwan.

Taiwan Cooperative Bank was listed by the Financial Supervisory Commission as a domestic systemically important bank (D-SIB), along with Taipei Fubon Bank, CTBC Bank, Cathay United Bank, Mega International Commercial Bank, and First Commercial Bank (第一銀行).

In 2022, the bank opened a Czech office in Prague to tap business opportunities in Central Europe. The move came in the midst of warming relations between Taiwan and the Czech Republic.

On 2 July 2023, CEO Lin Chien-hao (林謙浩) died, and operations were announced to be continuing under the interim leadership of bank president Lin Mao-yin (林衍茂) and general manager Chen Mei-tsu (陳美足).

== Baseball team ==
TCB baseball team

Information
- League: Popcorn League
- Location: Taipei
- Founded: 1948

Current uniforms
Home	Away

The Taiwan Cooperative Bank Baseball Team (Chinese: 合作金庫銀行棒球隊; pinyin: Hézuò Jīnkù Yínháng Bàngqiú Duì), also known as TCB Baseball Team (Chinese: 合庫棒球隊), is a team in the Popcorn League. Along with Taipower, TCB was one of the two teams in Taiwan's First Division amateur baseball league that were owned by government-sponsored corporations. The team won the Popcorn League championship in the 2017, 2018, 2020, 2021, and 2022 seasons and has the most championships in the league.

Founded in 1948, players on the team included Olympian Chang Hsing-hsien.

== See also ==
- List of banks in Taiwan
- List of companies of Taiwan
- Economy of Taiwan
