= List of Major League Baseball players from Taiwan =

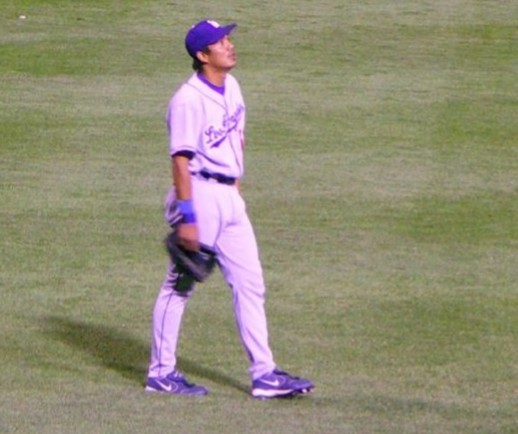
in September 2002, Chin-Feng Chen, seen here in 2005, became the first player born in Taiwan to appear in a Major League Baseball game.

This is a list of players from Taiwan who have played in Major League Baseball (MLB). There have been a total of 19 players who were born in Taiwan that have appeared in an MLB game.

== Background ==
All Taiwanese players who have appeared in Major League Baseball (MLB) began their professional baseball careers in the United States by signing with teams as an international free agent. The first Taiwanese baseball player to be selected and signed via the Major League Baseball draft process was Lyle Lin, who was drafted in the fourteenth round of the 2019 MLB draft, and signed with the Arizona Diamondbacks.

Taiwan-born MLB players, especially star pitcher Chien-Ming Wang, became household names of Taiwanese people and induced huge followings for their games during MLB seasons. In November 2011, the inaugural MLB Taiwan All-Star Series was played in five games at three ballparks across Taiwan during the postseason. Wang and Fu-Te Ni were called up by the Chinese Taipei national baseball team against the MLB All-Star team.

== Players ==
Listed below are Taiwanese players who have played in MLB, ordered by the date of their major-league debut.

No.	Name (Note: This article uses Western name order when mentioning individuals.)	MLB debut	MLB final game (Note: A dash (—) indicates the player is still active.)	Games (Note: Games played through the 2026 regular season.)	Position	MLB team(s)	Ref.
1	Chin-Feng Chen	September 14, 2002	July 23, 2005	19	Outfielder	Los Angeles Dodgers (2002–2005)	
2	Chin-Hui Tsao	July 25, 2003	May 21, 2016	57	Pitcher	Colorado Rockies (2003–2005); Los Angeles Dodgers (2007, 2015–2016)	
3	Chien-Ming Wang	April 30, 2005	August 30, 2016	174	Pitcher	New York Yankees (2005–2009); Washington Nationals (2011–2012); Toronto Blue Jays (2013); Kansas City Royals (2016)	
4	Hong-Chih Kuo	September 2, 2005	September 24, 2011	218	Pitcher	Los Angeles Dodgers (2005–2011)	
5	Chin-Lung Hu	September 1, 2007	May 16, 2011	118	Infielder	Los Angeles Dodgers (2007–2010); New York Mets (2011)	
6	Fu-Te Ni	June 28, 2009	June 29, 2010	58	Pitcher	Detroit Tigers (2009–2010)	
7	Wei-Yin Chen	April 10, 2012	September 28, 2019	219	Pitcher	Baltimore Orioles (2012–2015); Miami Marlins (2016–2019)	
8	Che-Hsuan Lin	April 14, 2012	October 1, 2012	9	Outfielder	Boston Red Sox (2012)	
9	C. C. Lee	July 14, 2013	September 30, 2015	47	Pitcher	Cleveland Indians (2013–2015)	
10	Chia-Jen Lo	July 31, 2013	September 28, 2013	19	Pitcher	Houston Astros (2013)	
11	Wei-Chung Wang	April 14, 2014	September 17, 2019	47	Pitcher	Milwaukee Brewers (2014, 2017); Oakland Athletics (2019); Pittsburgh Pirates (2019)	
12	Chih-Wei Hu	April 24, 2017	September 27, 2018	11	Pitcher	Tampa Bay Rays (2017–2018)	
13	Tzu-Wei Lin	June 24, 2017	April 26, 2021	102	Infielder	Boston Red Sox (2017–2020); Minnesota Twins (2021)	
14	Jen-Ho Tseng	September 14, 2017	May 8, 2018	3	Pitcher	Chicago Cubs (2017–2018)	
15	Wei-Chieh Huang	April 23, 2019	May 14, 2019	4	Pitcher	Texas Rangers (2019)	
16	Yu Chang	June 28, 2019	August 6, 2023	235	Infielder	Cleveland Guardians (2019–2022); Pittsburgh Pirates (2022); Tampa Bay Rays (2022); Boston Red Sox (2022–2023)	
17	Kai-Wei Teng	March 31, 2024	—	42	Pitcher	San Francisco Giants (2024–2025); Houston Astros (2026–)	
18	Tsung-Che Cheng	April 9, 2025	—	17	Infielder	Pittsburgh Pirates (2025); Boston Red Sox (2026)	
19	Hao-Yu Lee	April 17, 2026	—	110	Infielder	Detroit Tigers (2026–)	

== All-Star Game selections ==
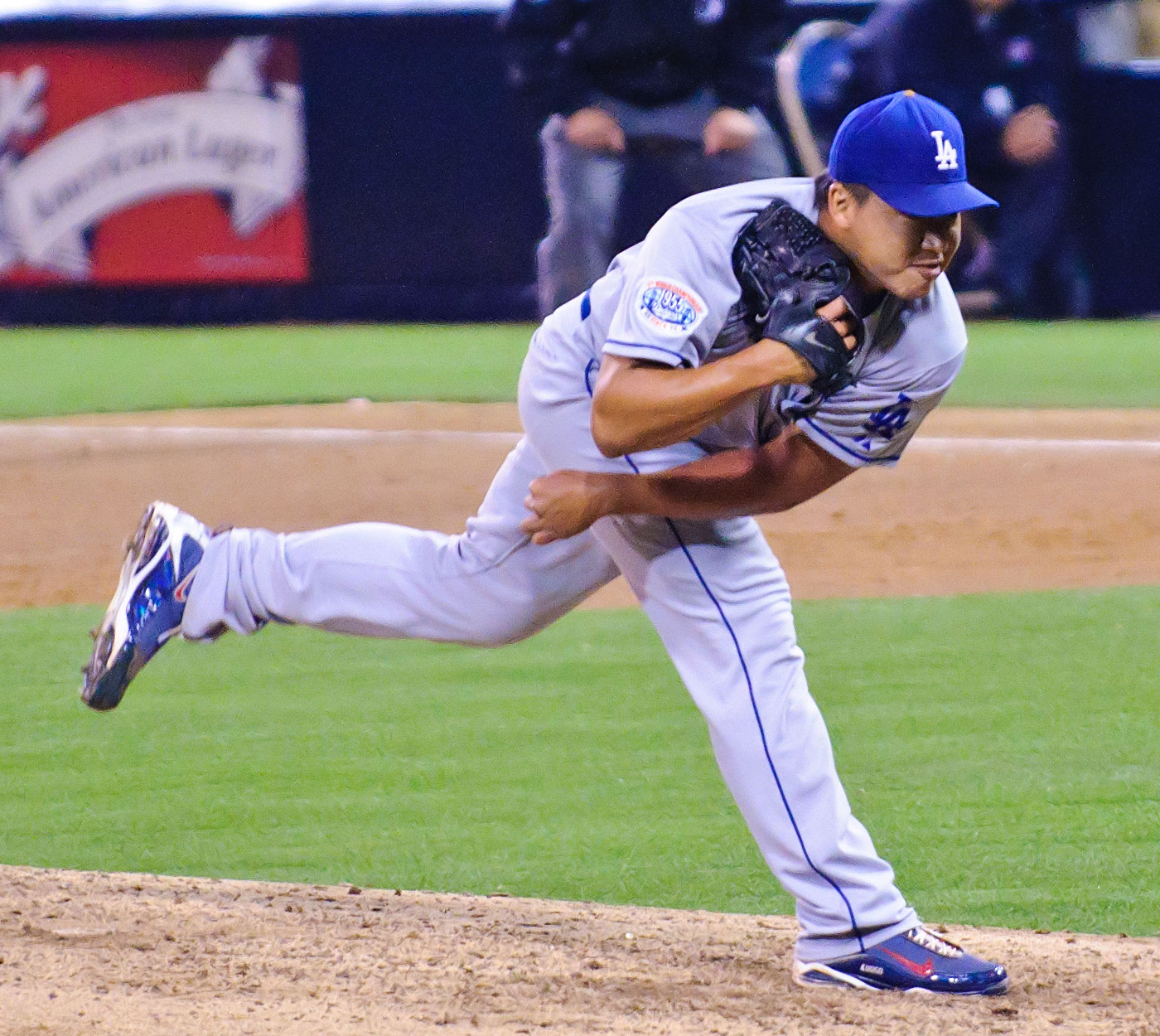
Hong-Chih Kuo with the 2010 Los Angeles Dodgers

To date, one Taiwanese player has been selected to a Major League Baseball All-Star Game.

Player	League	Selections	Year(s)	Notes
Hong-Chih Kuo	NL	1	2010	Selected in place of injured Jason Heyward.

== Postseason appearances ==
The below listed Taiwanese players have played in the Major League Baseball postseason.

Player	Seasons	Position	WC		DS		CS		World Series		Refs
Player	Seasons	Position	Series won	Games played	Series won	Games played	Series won	Games played	Series won	Games played	Refs
Wei-Yin Chen	2012 Baltimore Orioles; 2014 Baltimore Orioles	P			L W	1; 1	L	1			
Hong-Chih Kuo	2006 Los Angeles Dodgers; 2008 Los Angeles Dodgers; 2009 Los Angeles Dodgers	P			L W	1 1	L L	3; 4			
Chien-Ming Wang	2005 New York Yankees; 2006 New York Yankees; 2007 New York Yankees	P			L L L	1; 1; 2					
