= Radhames Liz =

Dominican baseball player (born 1983)

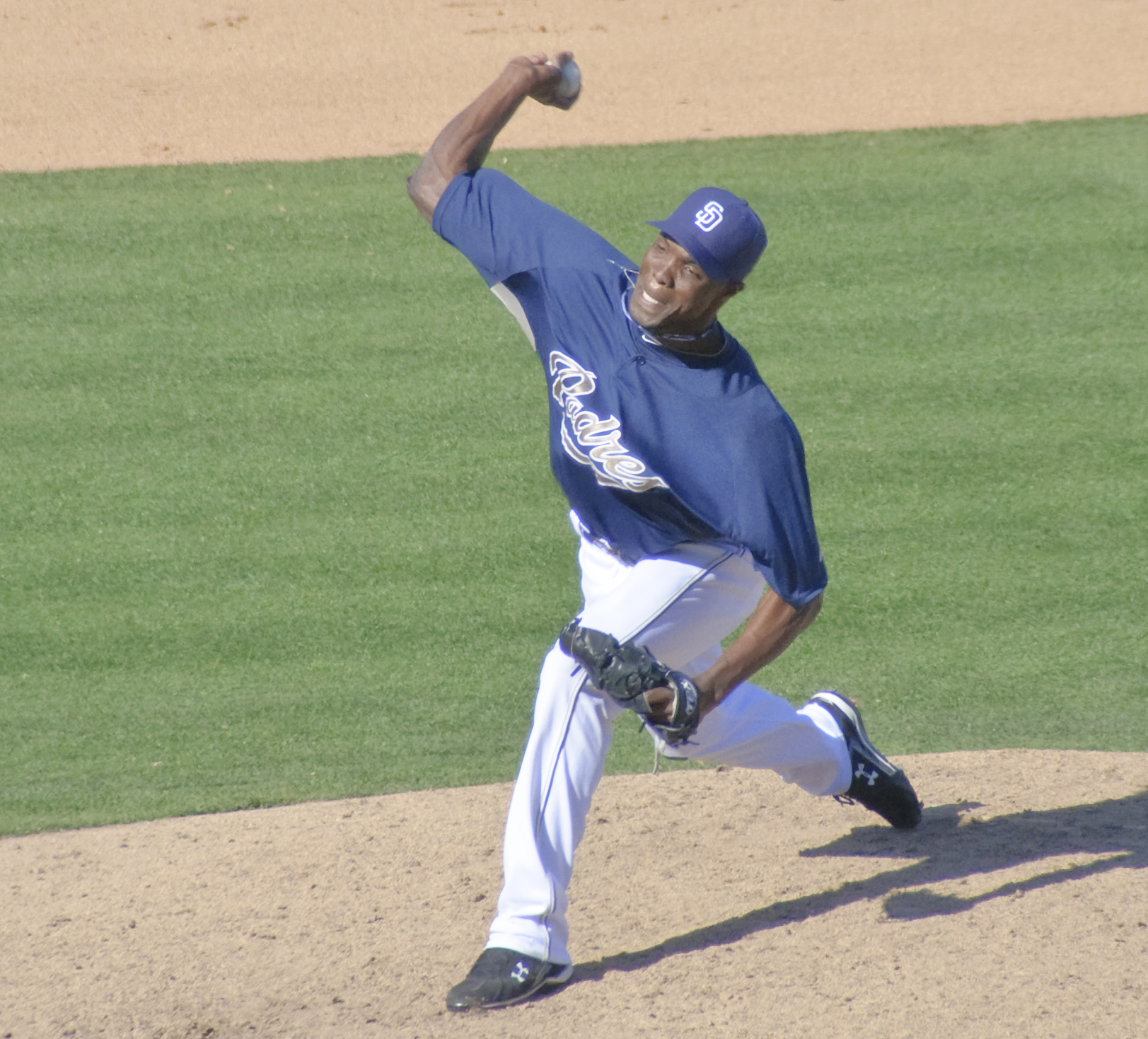
- Liz with the San Diego Padres

Leones del Escogido
- Pitcher
- Born: October 6, 1983 (age 43); El Seibo, Dominican Republic
- Batted: Right Threw: Right

Professional debut
- MLB: August 25, 2007, for the Baltimore Orioles
- KBO: April 2, 2011, for the LG Twins
- NPB: March 26, 2016, for the Tohoku Rakuten Golden Eagles
- CPBL: March 23, 2019, for the Rakuten Monkeys

Last MLB appearance
- September 10, 2015, for the Pittsburgh Pirates

MLB statistics (through 2015 season)
- Win–loss record: 7–12
- Earned run average: 6.94
- Strikeouts: 109

KBO statistics (through 2013 season)
- Win–loss record: 26–38
- Earned run average: 3.51
- Strikeouts: 454

NPB statistics (through 2016 season)
- Win–loss record: 0–3
- Earned run average: 6.94
- Strikeouts: 13

CPBL statistics (through 2020 season)
- Win–loss record: 16–6
- Earned run average: 4.18
- Strikeouts: 179
- Stats at Baseball Reference

Teams
- Baltimore Orioles (2007–2009); LG Twins (2011–2013); Pittsburgh Pirates (2015); Tohoku Rakuten Golden Eagles (2016); Lamigo Monkeys/Rakuten Monkeys (2019–2020)

Career highlights and awards
- CPBL: CPBL wins champion (2019); CPBL strikeout champion (2019); Taiwan Series champion (2019)

Radhames Corey Liz Garcia (born October 6, 1983) is a Dominican professional baseball pitcher for the Guerreros de Oaxaca of the Mexican League. He has previously played in Major League Baseball (MLB) for the Baltimore Orioles and Pittsburgh Pirates, in the KBO League for the LG Twins, in Nippon Professional Baseball (NPB) for the Tohoku Rakuten Golden Eagles, and in the Chinese Professional Baseball League (CPBL) for the Lamigo Monkeys.

== Biography ==
Liz, who is one of eight children in his family, started playing baseball when he was 16 years old and learned how to pitch in 2003 and 2004 while playing in the Dominican Summer League. He started pitching in the United States during the 2005 season.

== Professional career ==
=== Baltimore Orioles ===
Liz began his professional career in 2005, going 7–7 with a 2.86 ERA in 21 starts with the Single-A Aberdeen IronBirds and the Single-A Delmarva Shorebirds. In 2006, Liz started the year with the Frederick Keys, the highest of the Orioles' three Single-A teams. Liz began the season by striking out 33 batters in his first 15 innings pitched. Later in the year, he represented the Orioles on the World squad at the All-Star Futures Game. He also received a promotion to the Double-A Bowie Baysox; between the two teams, he struck out 149 batters in 133 1/3 innings before playing in the Dominican Winter League. However, he had difficulty with his control in the 2006 season, walking 75 batters. Baseball America named Liz the Orioles' fifth-best prospect going into the 2007 season, following Billy Rowell, Brandon Erbe, Nolan Reimold, and Pedro Beato.

Liz returned to Bowie for the 2007 season and was selected for the Eastern League's All-Star Game. He no-hit the Harrisburg Senators on June 1. His no-hitter was the first nine-inning no-hitter ever pitched at Prince George's Stadium, which has been open since 1994. On August 14, Liz took a no-hitter into the eighth inning against the Connecticut Defenders; he then allowed a single and a two-run home run, but struck out 14 batters in eight innings.

For the 2007 season, Liz had an 11–4 record for the Baysox with a 3.22 ERA and 161 strikeouts in 137 innings pitched. In his 10 starts at the Baysox' Prince George's Stadium, he was 9–0 with a 2.02 ERA in 62 1/3 innings pitched.

The Orioles recalled Liz from Bowie on August 24, 2007, to make a start against the Minnesota Twins at Oriole Park at Camden Yards the following day. He allowed five runs, including a three-run home run to Torii Hunter, in six innings. He consistently threw 97–98 miles per hour, with one pitch clocked at 100. In 2008, he mostly played for the Norfolk Tides, the Orioles' Triple-A affiliate in Norfolk, Virginia. In 15 starts with the Tides, Liz was 3–7 with a 3.62 ERA.

=== San Diego Padres ===
On November 25, 2009, Liz was claimed off waivers by the San Diego Padres. He played the 2010 season with the Portland Beavers, Triple-A affiliate of the Padres, and posted an 8–8 record with a 4.83 ERA and 109 strikeouts in 25 games (22 starts).

On January 5, 2011, Liz was released by the Padres.

=== LG Twins ===
On January 7, 2011, he signed with the LG Twins of the KBO League. Liz enjoyed a tenure of success in the KBO, leading the league in strikeouts in 2013 with 188. He would post a 26–38 record with a 3.51 ERA in three seasons with the Twins, totalling 518 2/3 innings pitched.

=== Toronto Blue Jays ===
Liz signed a minor league contract with the Toronto Blue Jays on March 8, 2014, and was assigned to the Triple-A Buffalo Bisons. After starting the season on the disabled list, he was assigned to the New Hampshire Fisher Cats on May 25 for a start against the Portland Sea Dogs.

=== Pittsburgh Pirates ===
On December 13, 2014, Liz signed a one-year Major League contract with the Pittsburgh Pirates for $1 million. Initially it was reported to be a two-year contract for $3 million. However, the deal was adjusted due to the Pirates being "uncomfortable" with Liz's physical results. On May 25, Liz was designated for assignment. He was re-added to the major league roster on September 1 and designated for assignment again on September 15.

=== Tohoku Rakuten Golden Eagles ===
On November 26, 2015, Liz signed a one-year deal with the Tohoku Rakuten Golden Eagles of Nippon Professional Baseball for the 2016 season.

=== Milwaukee Brewers ===
On December 22, 2017, Liz signed a minor league contract with the Milwaukee Brewers. He was released on June 1, 2018.

=== Lamigo Monkeys ===
On February 1, 2019, Liz signed with the Lamigo Monkeys of the Chinese Professional Baseball League. On January 5, 2020, he re-signed with the team (now named the Rakuten Monkeys) for the 2020 season. However, on February 9, Liz opted out of his contract for unspecified reasons, though he later clarified that it was due to a herniated disc in his back that he wanted to address.

=== Leones de Yucatán ===
On February 23, 2021, Liz signed with the Leones de Yucatán of the Mexican League. In 10 starts for the team, he registered a 4–3 record and 3.96 ERA with 50 strikeouts in 52.1 innings pitched. The following year, he made 15 starts, logging a 3–5 record and identical 3.96 ERA with 69 strikeouts in 72.2 innings of work. Liz won the Mexican League Championship with the Leones in 2022.

=== Toros de Tijuana ===
On December 2, 2022, Liz was traded to the Toros de Tijuana of the Mexican League in exchange for P Tyler Alexander. He was released on April 5, 2023, without making an appearance for the club. However, he later rejoined the team and officially signed with them on May 19. In 6 starts, he posted a 1–0 record with a 2.96 ERA and 20 strikeouts over 27.1 innings. Liz was waived on June 25, 2023.

=== Tecolotes de los Dos Laredos ===
On July 8, 2023, Liz signed with the Tecolotes de los Dos Laredos of the Mexican League. In 4 starts for Dos Laredos, Liz logged a 2–1 record and 4.26 ERA with 11 strikeouts across 19 innings pitched.

=== Guerreros de Oaxaca ===
On February 22, 2024, Liz signed with the Guerreros de Oaxaca of the Mexican League. In 9 starts for Oaxaca, he posted a 2–2 record and 3.43 ERA with 42 strikeouts over 42 innings of work.

In 2025, Liz returned to Oaxaca for a second season. In 17 games (15 starts) he threw 68.1 innings going 5–2 with a 5.53 ERA and 65 strikeouts.

== Scouting report ==
Liz is known for his remarkably long arms; when he stands with his arms at his sides, his fingers reach below his knees. Liz uses a straight overhand pitching motion and throws his fastball consistently in the mid- to upper-90s and has been clocked at 99 mph. His other pitches include an overhand curveball, a sinker, a slider, and two variations of a changeup. Early in his professional career, Liz received attention because of a clicking sound which is sometimes loud enough to be heard in the stands and occurs whenever he throws a pitch. Some have thought it to be his thumb clicking against his index finger. Orioles head athletic trainer Richie Bancells discovered that Liz's scapula caused the clicking; although rare, this condition does not hurt his pitching career. To treat this condition, Liz has been doing an exercise program to strengthen the muscles around his collarbone.

== Honours ==
=== Club ===
Lamigo Monkeys

- Taiwan Series Champions: 2019

=== Individual ===
- CPBL wins champions: 2019
- CPBL strikeout champions: 2019

== Personal life ==
Liz is of Haitian descent.
