= Popcorn League =

Baseball league in Taiwan

- Sport: Baseball
- Founded: 2014
- No. of teams: 11
- Country: Taiwan
- Continent: Asia
- Most titles: Taiwan Cooperative Bank (6)

The Popcorn League, also known as the Popcorn Baseball League (Chinese: 爆米花棒球聯盟), is a semi-professional baseball league based in Taiwan. Founded in 2014, the league started out as a summer independent league. After a hiatus from 2015 to 2016, it became a winter league starting in 2017.

== History ==
In 2014, as a partnership between the Chinese Taipei Baseball Association (CTBA) and sports broadcasting company Videoland Sports, the Popcorn League was established. Videoland Sports had recently lost the bid to carry top-tier Chinese Professional Baseball League (CPBL) games on its local cable network for the first time in 18 years and stated its commitment to improve the level of play in local baseball. According to the CTBA commissioner, the league saw see itself as a "means to provide a steady stream of talented players for the CPBL" and aimed to work with Major League Baseball in the United States by allowing up to four foreign players and one coach on each team to enhance the level of its play.

In the league's first foreign players draft, Chen Chun-hsiu was selected in the first round by Chii Lih Coral. In the inaugural season, the Topco Falcons defeated Taiwan Cooperative Bank at Tianmu Baseball Stadium to win the league's first championship.

The league was inactive for the 2015 and 2016 seasons, returning in 2017. Taiwan Cooperative defeated Taipei Highwealth to win its first championship. In the following season, Taiwan Cooperative Bank defeated Topco Scientific to secure its second consecutive championship. The winning streak ended in the 2019 season, when Taipei Highwealth defeated Taiwan Cooperative Bank in the championship series.

On 19 September 2022, CBTA commissioner Jeffrey Koo Jr., Sports Administration secretary-general Lu Hung-chin, and LabTurbo Biotech general manager Eric Tai announced that LabTurbo Biotech would become the league’s 11th team.

In the 2023 season, four Popcorn League teams became the first to play at the Taipei Dome in a closed-door doubleheader ahead of the venue's official opening. On 14 November, Taipei Highwealth played New Taipei Heran in the morning, and Taiwan Cooperative Bank played Xports in the afternoon. On 18 December, Taiwan Cooperative Bank defeated Taipower to win a third consecutive championship, its fifth in history.

In January 2024, CTBC, which owns the CTBC Brothers, announced that it would sponsor the Taichung team, along with Taiwan Life. This team defeated Taipower in December 2024 to win its first championship.

== Current teams ==
As of 2023, there are 11 active teams:

Team	Joined	Founded	City
LabTurbo Biotech	2022	2019	Taipei
New Taipei Heran	2017	2009	New Taipei
Pingtung Brown Shrike	2021		Pingtung County
Taichung Taiwan Life	2014	2009	Taichung
Tainan	2017	2014	Tainan
Taipei Highwealth	2017	2009	Taipei
Taitung Chii Lih	2014	2011	Taitung County
Taiwan Cooperative Bank	2014	1948	Taipei
Taiwan Power Company	2014	1948	Kaohsiung
Taoyuan Aerotropolis	2017	2009	Taoyuan
Xports	2014	2011	Taipei

== Champions ==
Season	No. of teams	League Champion	Notes
2014	6	Topco Scientific Falcons	
2015	None (season cancelled)		
2016	None (season cancelled)		
2017	10	Taiwan Cooperative Bank	
2018	9	Taiwan Cooperative Bank	
2019	10	Taipei Highwealth	
2020	10	Taiwan Cooperative Bank	
2021	10	Taiwan Cooperative Bank	
2022	11	Taiwan Cooperative Bank	
2023	11	Taiwan Cooperative Bank	
2024	11	Taichung Taiwan Life	

== See also ==
- Mavericks Independent Baseball League
