= Chinese Taipei Baseball Association =

National baseball association of Taiwan

- Sport: Baseball
- Abbreviation: 中華民國棒球協會
- Founded: 1949
- Affiliation: IBAF
- Affiliation date: 1973
- Regional affiliation: BFA
- Affiliation date: 1954
- Location: 4F, No.238, Sec 2, Chien-Kuo N Road, Chung-shan District, Taipei
- President: Chou Ling-wen

Official website
- www.ctba.org.tw

The Chinese Taipei Baseball Association (CTBA; Chinese: 中華台北棒球協會; pinyin: Zhōnghuá Táiběi bàngqiú xiéhuì) was established on February 28, 1973 to promote and develop baseball in Taiwan (known in international competition as Chinese Taipei due to political pressure from the People's Republic of China). The CTBA assists with hosting national and international baseball competitions to enhance the quality of Taiwanese baseball, and also to enhance the health of Taiwanese citizens, as well as promotes sportsmanship.

Baseball was introduced to Taiwan during Japanese occupation and is claimed to be one of the oldest national sports in Taiwanese history. The 7th president Peng Chenghao took over the office in 1998, and Jeffrey Koo, Jr. took over in 2018.

== Sponsored leagues and games ==
- National Adult Class A Spring League (全國成棒甲組春季聯賽)
- Association Cup Championship (協會盃年度大賽)
- Popcorn League

== Controversy ==
During 2013 World Baseball Classic games, CTBA failed to fulfill obligations with the following incidents:

1. CTBA promised famous former baseball player Kuo Tai-yuan as the manager of Chinese Taipei. However, CPBL (中華職棒), who is responsible for the training affairs, designates Hsieh Chang-heng as the manager.
2. No VIP Access: CTBA didn't issue VIP access to CPBL commissioner Huang Chen-tai, in the first-round games held in Taichung, Taiwan. Neither did CTBA apply access to the games held in Tokyo Dome for him.
3. No Breakfast Payment: Chinese Taipei coaches request unified breakfast service for the players. However, CTBA failed to have relative staff in scene. CPBL paid for the players tentatively.
4. Distributed Arrival: After losing games on 3/9 to Cuba, Chinese Taipei players come back to Taiwan in an urge. They are separated into five flights.
5. National Honor Prize: CTBA thought opponents of WBC games are superior to Chinese Taipei and didn't expect to win any titles. Therefore, they failed to apply National Honor Prize from the Sport Administration.

== See also ==
- Sport in Taiwan
- Chinese Taipei Olympic Committee
- Chinese Taipei national baseball team
- Chinese Taipei women's national baseball team
- Chinese Professional Baseball League
- Popcorn League
- WikiBaseball
