= Enrique Burgos (baseball, born 1965) =

Panamanian baseball player (born 1965)

- Pitcher
- Born: October 7, 1965 (age 60); La Chorrera, Panama
- Batted: Left Threw: Left

MLB debut
- July 15, 1993, for the Kansas City Royals

Last MLB appearance
- July 2, 1995, for the San Francisco Giants

CPBL statistics
- Win–loss record: 36–36
- Earned run average: 3.20
- Strikeouts: 736

MLB statistics
- Win–loss record: 0–1
- Earned run average: 8.78
- Strikeouts: 18
- Stats at Baseball Reference

Teams
- Uni-President Lions (1990–1992); Kansas City Royals (1993); San Francisco Giants (1995); Brother Elephants (1996–1997)

Career highlights and awards
- Taiwan Series champion (1991)
Medals
Men's baseball
Representing Panama
Bolivarian Games
Gold medal – first place	2001 Guayaquil	Team

Enrique Burgos Calles (born October 7, 1965) is a Panamanian former professional baseball pitcher. He played in Major League Baseball (MLB) for the Kansas City Royals and San Francisco Giants, and in the Chinese Professional Baseball League (CPBL) for the Brother Elephants and Uni-President Lions.

== Career ==
From 1993 to 1995, he played for the Kansas City Royals and the San Francisco Giants. He was signed by the Toronto Blue Jays as an amateur free agent in 1983 and was involved in a trade for Brent Cookson in 1995. He would have stints in Mexico and Taiwan before ending his professional career.

== Sources ==
- Career statistics from MLB · ESPN · Baseball Reference · Baseball Reference (Minors) · Retrosheet · Baseball Almanac
