= Itsuki Shoda =

Japanese baseball player

Itsuki Shoda 正田 樹
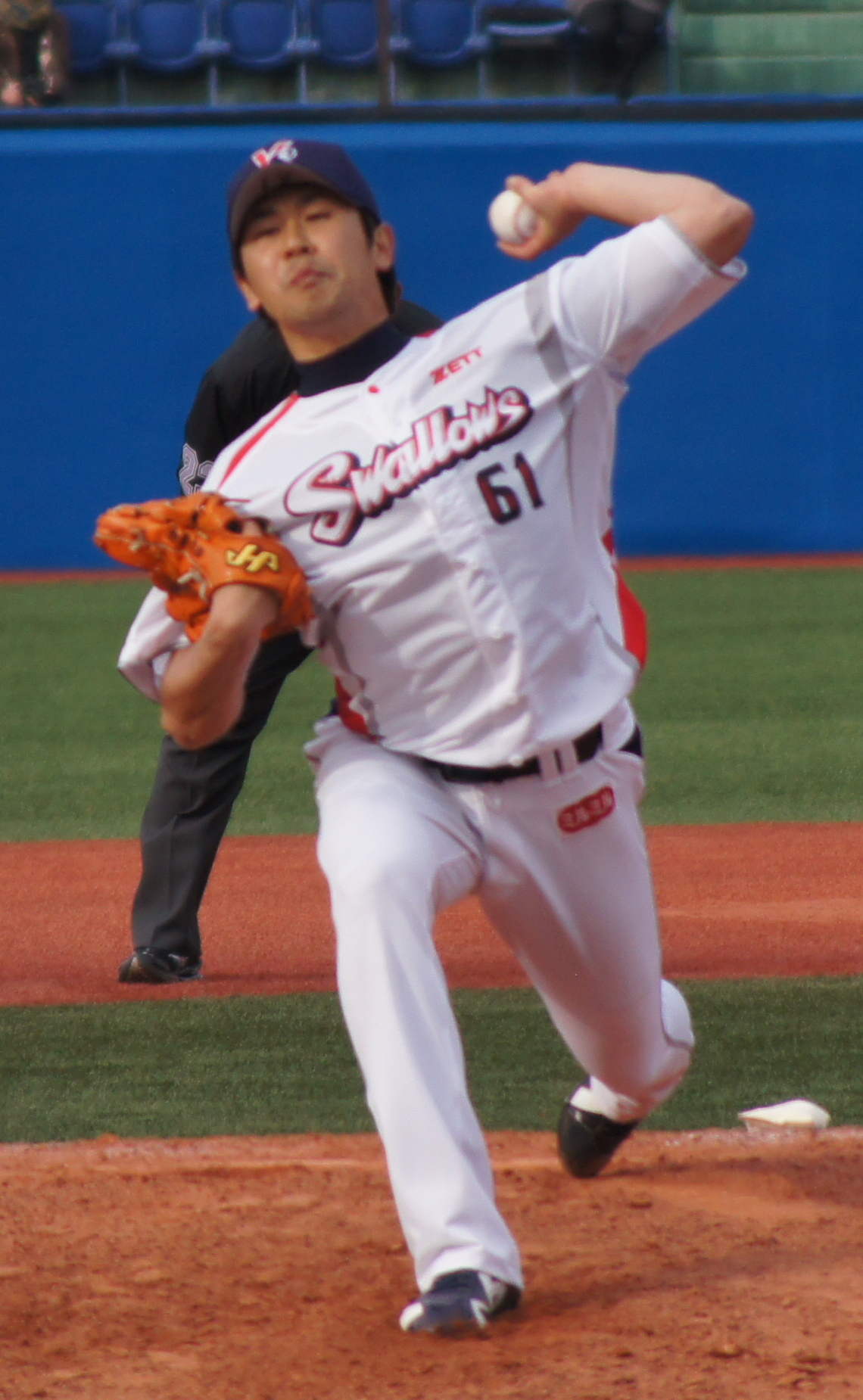

Tokyo Yakult Swallows – No. 81
- Pitcher / Coach
- Born: November 3, 1981 (age 44); Ota, Gunma, Japan
- Batted: Left Threw: Left

Professional debut
- NPB: August 6, 2000, for the Nippon Ham Fighters
- CPBL: March 29, 2009, for the Sinon Bulls

Last appearance
- NPB: June 27, 2013, for the Tokyo Yakult Swallows
- CPBL: May 11, 2014, for the Lamigo Monkeys

NPB statistics
- Win–loss record: 25–38
- Earned run average: 4.70
- Strikeouts: 263

CPBL statistics
- Win–loss record: 27–13
- Earned run average: 3.74
- Strikeouts: 245
- Stats at Baseball Reference

Teams
- As player: Nippon Ham Fighters/Hokkaido Nippon-Ham Fighters (2000–2006); Sinon Bulls (2009–2010); Tokyo Yakult Swallows (2012–2013); Lamigo Monkeys (2014); As coach: Ehime Mandarin Pirates (2022–2023); Tokyo Yakult Swallows (2024–present)

Career highlights and awards
- 2002 Pacific League Rookie of the Year

Itsuki Shoda (正田 樹, Shoda Itsuki; born November 3, 1981 in Ota, Gunma, Japan) is a Japanese former professional baseball player. He was originally drafted by the Nippon-Ham Fighters in 2000, playing 5 seasons, before playing for the Hanshin Tigers.
