= Hong-Chih Kuo =

Taiwanese baseball player (born 1981)

Hong-Chih Kuo 郭泓志
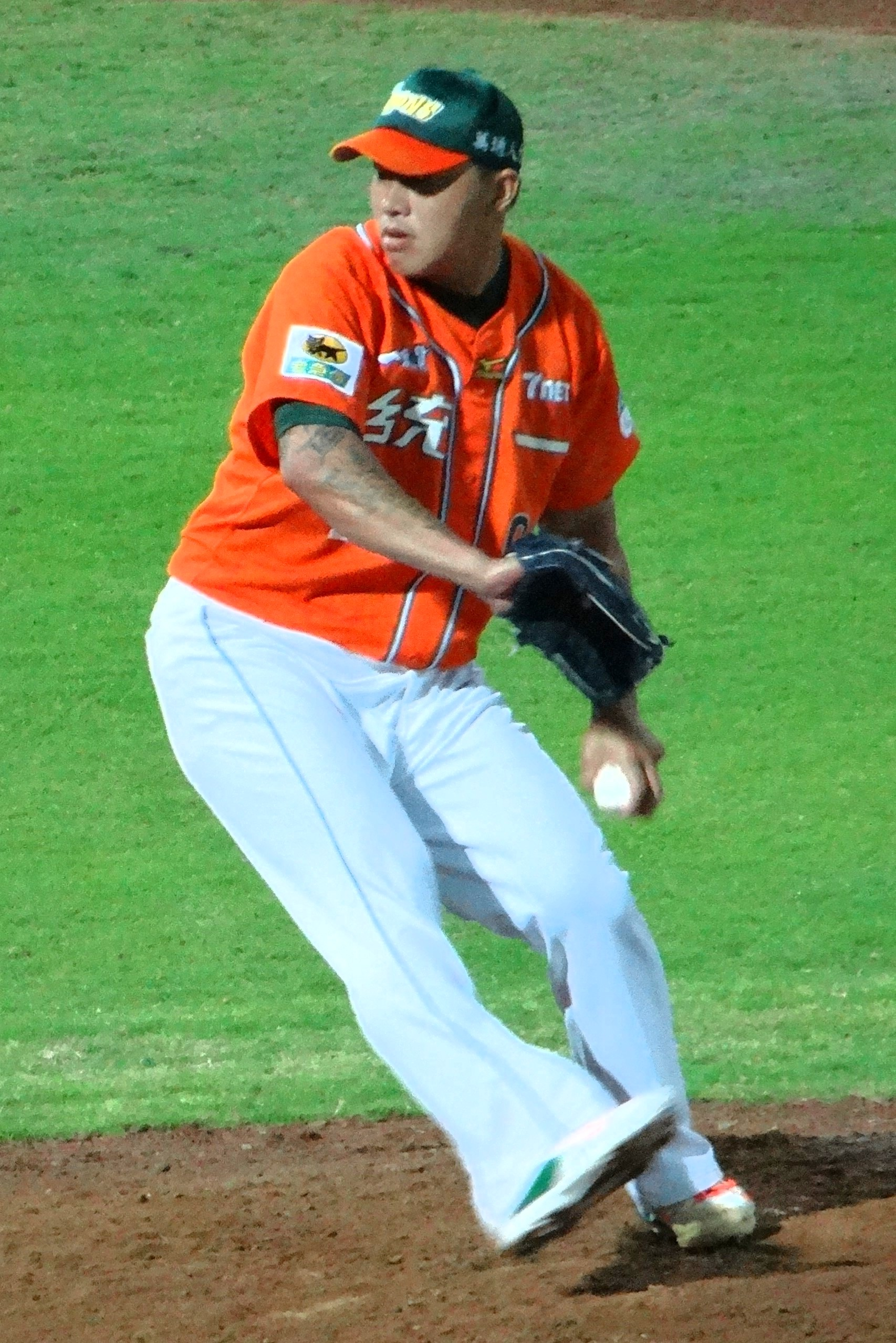
- Kuo with the Uni-President Lions in 2014
- Pitcher
- Born: July 23, 1981 (age 45); Tainan, Taiwan
- Batted: Left Threw: Left

Professional debut
- MLB: September 2, 2005, for the Los Angeles Dodgers
- CPBL: April 19, 2014, for the Uni-President Lions

Last appearance
- MLB: September 24, 2011, for the Los Angeles Dodgers
- CPBL: October 22, 2018, for the Fubon Guardians

MLB statistics
- Win–loss record: 13–17
- Earned run average: 3.73
- Strikeouts: 345
- Saves: 13

CPBL statistics
- Win–loss record: 5–14
- Earned run average: 3.81
- Strikeouts: 147
- Saves: 31
- Stats at Baseball Reference

Teams
- Los Angeles Dodgers (2005–2011); Uni-President Lions (2014–2015); Fubon Guardians (2017–2018)

Career highlights and awards
- All-Star (2010)
Medals
Men's baseball
Representing Chinese Taipei
Asian Games
Silver medal – second place	2002 Busan	Team
Gold medal – first place	2006 Doha	Team

Hong-Chih Kuo
- Traditional Chinese: 郭泓志
- Simplified Chinese: 郭泓志
Transcriptions
Standard Mandarin
- Hanyu Pinyin: Guō Hóngzhì
- Wade–Giles: Kuo Hung-Chih

Hong-Chih Kuo (Chinese: 郭泓志; pinyin: Guō Hóngzhì; Wade–Giles: Kuo¹ Hung² Chih⁴; born July 23, 1981, in Tainan, Taiwan) is a Taiwanese retired professional baseball pitcher who last pitched for the Fubon Guardians of the Chinese Professional Baseball League (CPBL). He had previously played in Major League Baseball (MLB) for the Los Angeles Dodgers and the Uni-President 7-Eleven Lions in CPBL. When Kuo made his debut in 2005, he became the fourth MLB player from Taiwan (after Chin-Feng Chen, Chin-hui Tsao, and Chien-Ming Wang).

== Playing career ==
=== Los Angeles Dodgers ===
Kuo was signed as a free agent by the Dodgers on June 19, 1999, for a bonus of $1.25 million, but elbow problems prevented him from participating with the team. He underwent two Tommy John surgeries in 2000 and 2003, respectively. It wasn't until 2005 that Kuo was able to pitch again on a consistent basis. That year, he pitched 11 games for the Vero Beach Dodgers and 17 games for the Jacksonville Suns before coming out of the bullpen for his Major League debut on September 2, 2005, against the Colorado Rockies.

==== 2006 season ====
Kuo started the 2006 season as a relief pitcher. After giving up eight earned runs on 15 walks in only 13 innings pitched in April, he was sent down to the Dodgers' Triple-A affiliate, the Las Vegas 51s. That May and June in Triple-A he posted a 3.75 ERA in Las Vegas in 12 innings, striking out 18, but walking eight. He was called up by the Dodgers in June. Over June and July 2006, Kuo had a 5.74 ERA in 14 1/3 innings pitched.

Back in Las Vegas for most of July, the Dodgers decided to start Kuo rather than have him work out of the bullpen, hoping that the increased innings would give him a chance to improve his control, and that ample rest between appearances would protect his fragile elbow. His ERA in July was 5.19, with 17 strikeouts and eight walks in 17 1/3 IP. However, in his last start of the month, he had his longest appearance in several years, pitching five shutout innings. Kuo built upon that with a 1.14 ERA in five August starts, striking out 28 in 23 2/3 innings.

On September 8, 2006, Kuo made his first start in the major leagues after more than 30 relief appearances. In his debut, he tossed six shutout innings and led the Dodgers to a 5–0 victory over the New York Mets. His next three starts were largely successful, and Kuo ended the season with a 2.59 ERA as a starter.

==== 2007 season ====
A spring training injury kept Kuo from starting the 2007 season in the Dodgers' rotation, but he eventually reclaimed his starting pitcher role.

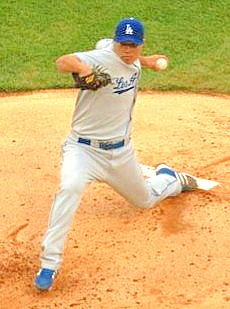
Kuo pitching for the Los Angeles Dodgers in 2007

On June 12, 2007, Kuo hit a 412-foot home run and became the first Taiwanese player to hit a home run in MLB. The Dodgers won 4–1 in that game. Kuo picked up his first win of the season with that game.

==== 2008 season ====
Kuo started the season competing with Esteban Loaiza for the fifth starter spot in the Dodgers rotation. Off-season elbow surgery raised doubts about his endurance, so Kuo was made a long-reliever by manager Joe Torre. He has also served in middle relief and set-up.

Against the New York Mets on May 6, Kuo came in during the fourth inning in relief of Hiroki Kuroda, and pitched 3 2/3 scoreless innings without giving up a hit, striking out 8 of the 12 batters he faced, and securing his second victory of the year. Kuo recorded his first career save on August 14 against the Phillies when he pitched two scoreless innings without allowing a hit.

Kuo finished the 2008 season with a 5–3 record, appeared in 42 games, three games as a starter and 39 games in relief, and accumulated an overall ERA of 2.14 with 96 strikeouts in 80 innings. Kuo led all National League relievers with an ERA of 1.69. In his 39 relief appearances, he allowed only 49 hits in 69 1/3 innings, striking out 86 batters, while limiting the opposition to a .204 average.

A triceps injury forced him to miss the last 15 games of the regular season, but he recovered in time for the National League Championship series and was activated on October 9. He appeared in three games during the Championship series, logging three innings, allowing two hits and one earned run, while striking out three.

Kuo was named the 2008 Setup Man of the Year, voted by the fans on MLB.com as part of the website's This Year in Baseball Awards.

==== 2009 season ====
Kuo began the 2009 season in the Dodgers' bullpen but injured his elbow and was placed on the disabled list on May 2. He did not rejoin the team until July 27 but returned to form and pitched in 35 games for the Dodgers' bullpen, ending with an ERA of 3.00.

==== 2010 season ====
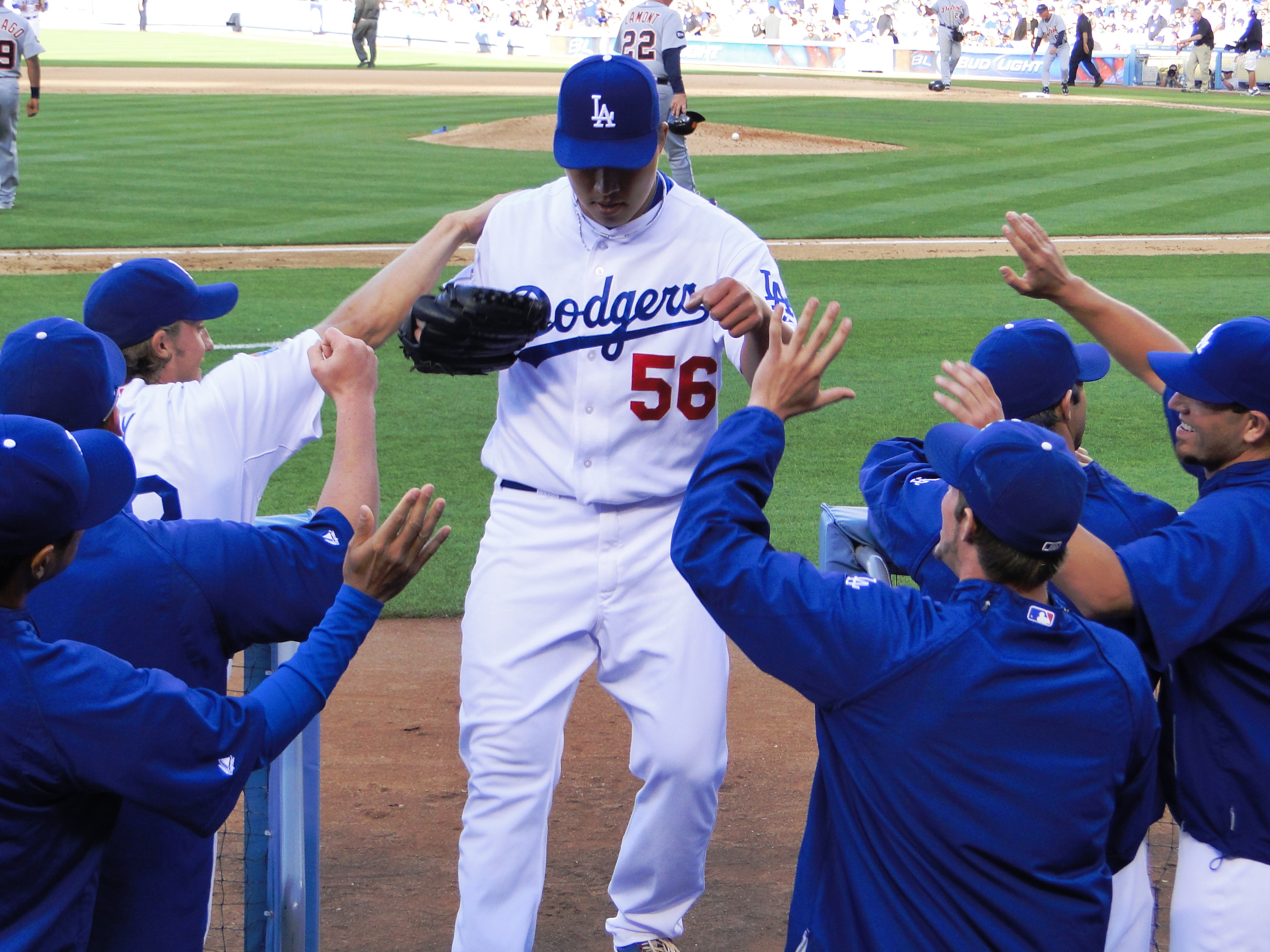
Kuo greeted by teammates after getting Miguel Cabrera to tap out to Kuo with the bases loaded in 2010

Kuo in the first half pitched in middle relief and set a record by giving up 0 hits against 36 consecutive left-handed batters. The performance earned him a spot in the 2010 Major League Baseball All-Star Game as a replacement for Jason Heyward, thus becoming the first Taiwanese-born player to be so honored. In the second half of the season Kuo replaced Jonathan Broxton as the Dodgers closer after Broxton struggled in the role.

On October 3, 2010, Kuo pitched a scoreless 9th inning against the Arizona Diamondbacks at Dodger Stadium, earning his 12th save of the season while setting a new Dodgers franchise record in finishing the season with an ERA of 1.20, the record for minimum of 50 innings pitched. Eric Gagne held the previous record at 1.202.

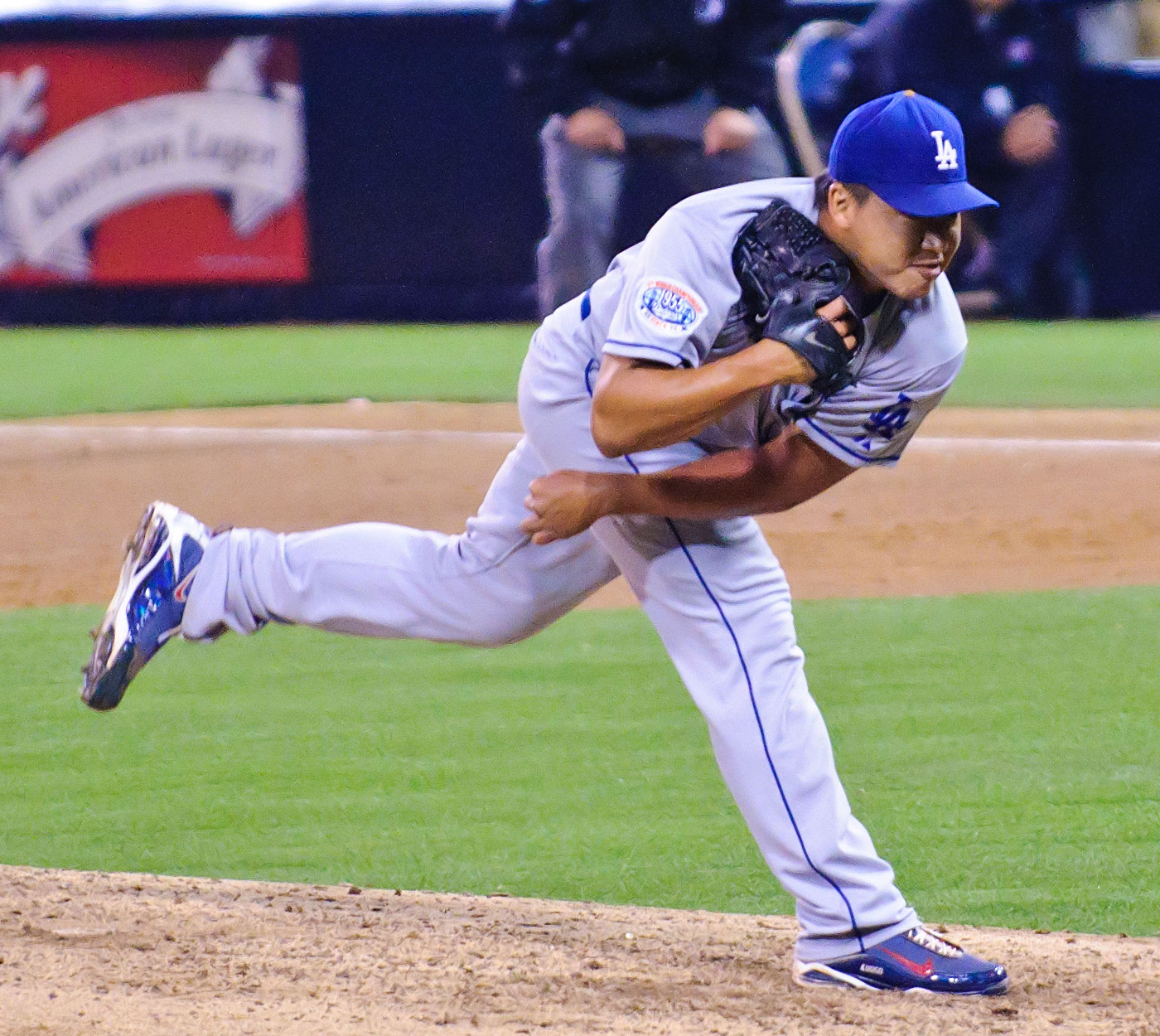
Kuo with the Los Angeles Dodgers in 2010

Kuo finished the 2010 season with a 3–2 record and led all Major League relievers with a 1.20 ERA. In 56 appearances out of the bullpen, he pitched 60.0 innings, struck out 73, walked 18 (4.05 strikeout to walk ratio) while converting 12 saves in 13 chances.

==== 2011 season ====
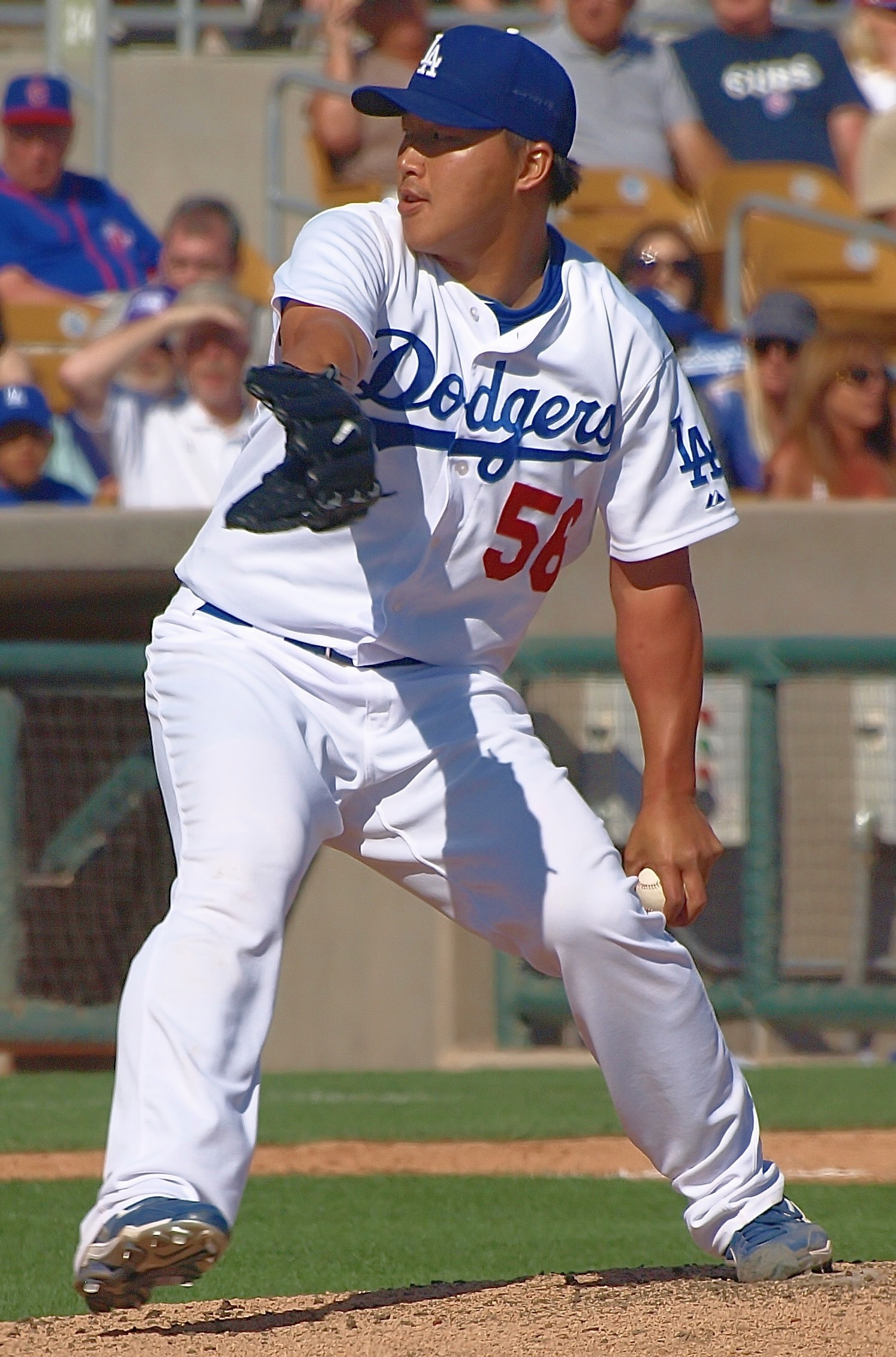
Kuo pitching for the Los Angeles Dodgers in 2011 Spring Training

Following the 2010 campaign, Kuo was throwing with about 50 or 60 percent effort during the off-season without stopping at the behest of the Dodgers medical staff. As Kuo typically experiences elbow problems during spring training each year, it was suggested that the off-season throwing exercises would help him avoid the disabled list at the start of the season. However, Kuo struggled early on. He spent some time on the DL with a back strain and in nine games he had an 11.57 ERA. On May 11, the Dodgers put him back on the disabled list with what they termed an "anxiety disorder". Manager Don Mattingly said he did not know when Kuo would be able to pitch again. He did eventually rejoin the Dodgers on August 10 but continued to pitch poorly down the stretch. Kuo finished the season 1–2 with a career-high ERA of 9.00 in 27 innings pitched. At the end of the season, he remarked that he was undecided about if he wanted to continue playing.

Following the season, Kuo developed soreness in his left elbow while preparing to play in an exhibition series against the Taiwan National Team and had to undergo his fifth operation on the elbow. He became a free agent when the Dodgers declined to tender him a contract on December 12.

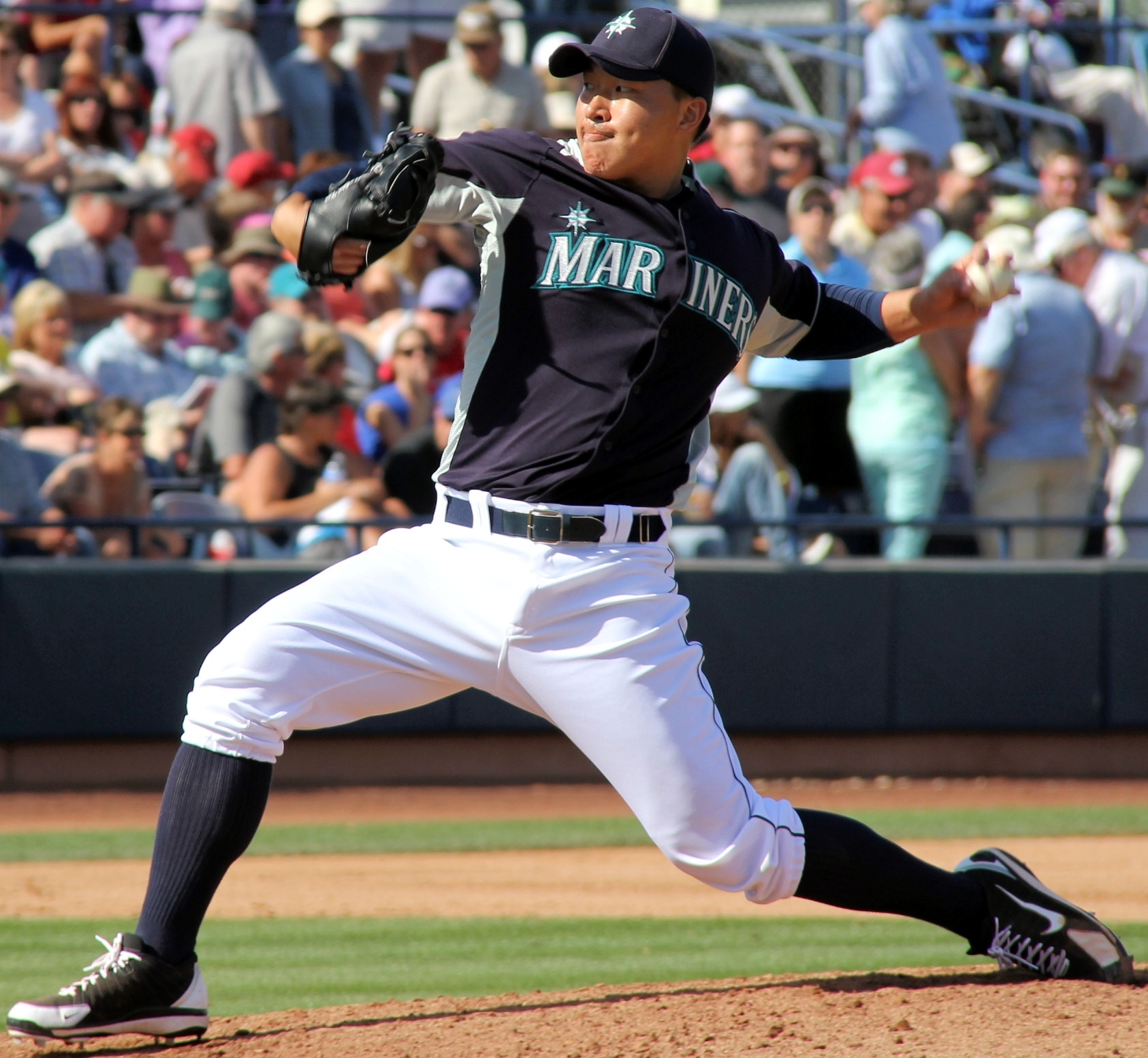
Kuo pitching for the Seattle Mariners in 2012 Spring Training

On February 6, 2012, Kuo signed a one-year non-guaranteed contract with the Seattle Mariners. He was released on March 19. On June 4, Kuo signed a minor league contract with the Chicago Cubs. However, he was released without making an appearance for the organization on July 6.

=== Uni-President 7-Eleven Lions ===
On September 27, 2013, Kuo signed with the Uni-President Lions of the Chinese Professional Baseball League. He became a free agent after the 2016 season.

=== Fubon Guardians ===
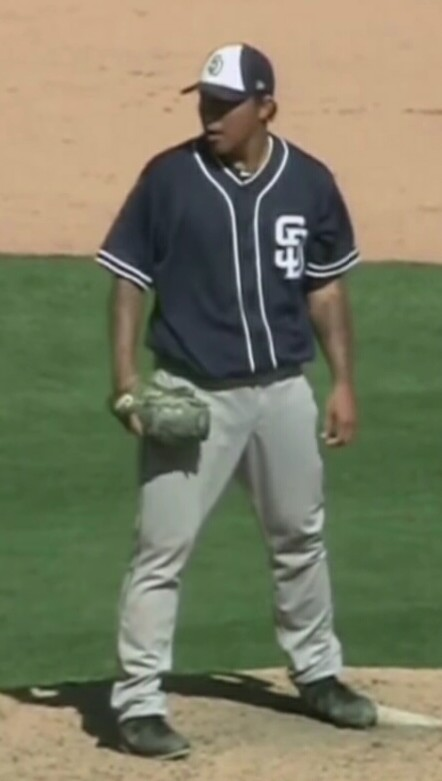
Kuo pitching for the San Diego Padres in 2017 Spring Training

On February 17, 2017, Kuo signed a minor league contract with the San Diego Padres. He requested and was granted release by San Diego on March 29.

On July 11, 2017, Kuo signed with Fubon Guardians of the Chinese Professional Baseball League. He made 20 relief appearances for Fubon down the stretch, struggling to an 0-4 record and 6.27 ERA with 27 strikeouts and 4 saves across 18 2/3 innings pitched.

Kuo made 37 appearances for the team in 2018, logging a 4-2 record and 3.71 ERA with 44 strikeouts over 34 innings of work. Kuo announced his retirement from professional baseball on October 22, 2018, after the Guardians lost to the Uni-President 7-Eleven Lions in the playoffs.

== International career ==
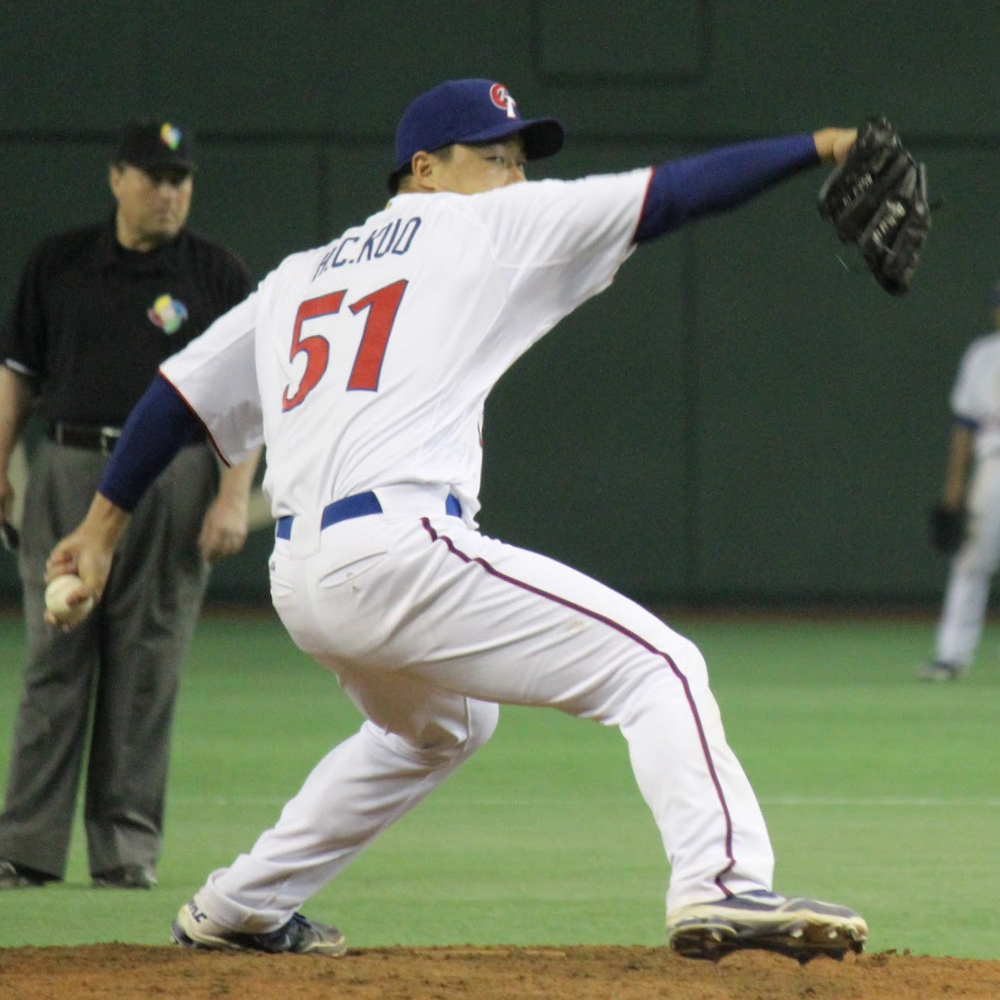
Kuo in 2013

He was selected for Chinese Taipei national baseball team at the 2002 Asian Games, 2006 World Baseball Classic, 2006 Asian Games and 2013 World Baseball Classic.

== Pitching style ==
Despite the five surgeries on his elbow, Kuo at his peak hit 97-98 mph with his four-seam fastball with late movement. He threw a sharp slider ranging in 86–88 mph, occasionally a curveball, and a changeup. For a power pitcher, Kuo was quick to the plate. His velocity and pitch execution made him difficult to hit. His fastball was clocked at 99 mph in 2006.

== Personal life ==
Kuo's nephew Lin Chen-wei was signed by the St. Louis Cardinals in 2023.

== See also ==
- List of Major League Baseball players from Taiwan
