= Flip Saunders =

American basketball player and coach (1955–2015)

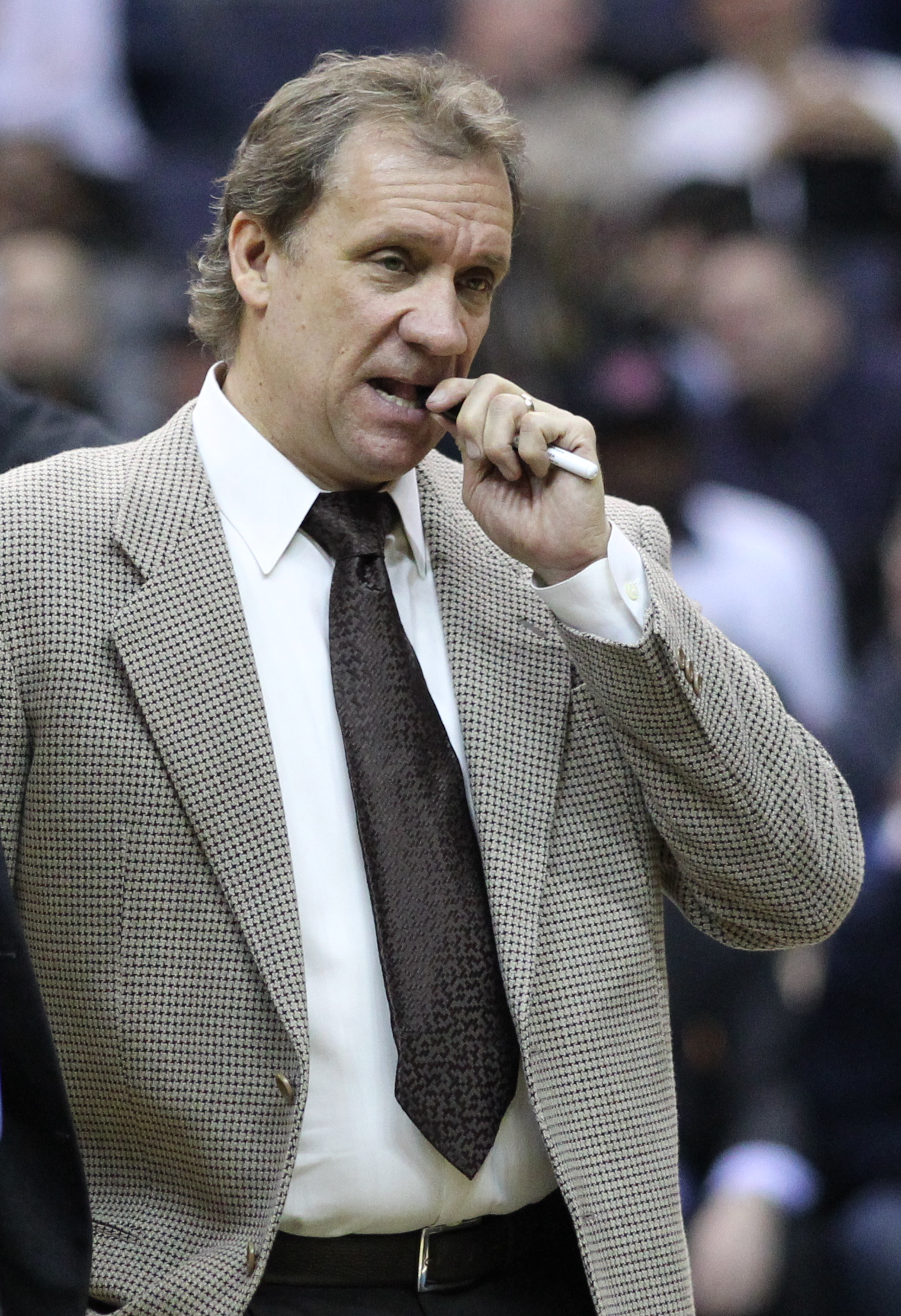
- Saunders coaching the Washington Wizards in 2011

Personal information
- Born: February 23, 1955 Cleveland, Ohio, U.S.
- Died: October 25, 2015 (aged 60) Minneapolis, Minnesota, U.S.
- Listed height: 5 ft 11 in (1.80 m)
- Listed weight: 175 lb (79 kg)

Career information
- High school: Cuyahoga Heights (Cuyahoga Heights, Ohio)
- College: Minnesota (1973–1977)
- Coaching career: 1977–2015

Career highlights
- As head coach: "FLIP" honored by Minnesota Timberwolves; 2× NBA All-Star Game head coach (2004, 2006); 2× CBA champion (1990, 1992); 2× CBA Coach of the Year (1990, 1992)

Philip Daniel "Flip" Saunders (February 23, 1955 – October 25, 2015) was an American basketball player and coach. During his career, he coached the La Crosse Catbirds, Minnesota Timberwolves, Detroit Pistons, and Washington Wizards.

== High school and college player ==
Saunders was born in Cleveland, Ohio in February 1955. He was an All-state basketball player at Cuyahoga Heights High School in suburban Cleveland. In his senior season, 1973, he was named Ohio's Class A High School Basketball Player of the Year, leading the state in scoring average with 32.0 points per game. At the University of Minnesota, he started 101 of his 103 career contests and as a senior, teamed with Ray Williams, Mychal Thompson, Kevin McHale, and Osborne Lockhart.

== Coaching career ==
=== College ===
Saunders began his coaching career at Golden Valley Lutheran College where he compiled a 92–13 record, including a perfect 56–0 mark at home, in four seasons. In 1981, he became an assistant coach at his alma mater, Minnesota, and helped guide the Golden Gophers to the Big Ten championship that season. After five seasons at Minnesota, he became an assistant coach at the University of Tulsa where he worked for two seasons before heading to the pro ranks.

=== Rapid City, La Crosse, and Sioux Falls (CBA) ===
Saunders became the coach of the Rapid City Thrillers of the Continental Basketball Association (CBA) in the 1988–89 season, where future Kings and Warriors head coach Eric Musselman served as the team's general manager. Musselman's father, Bill Musselman, had recruited Flip when Bill was head coach at the University of Minnesota.

Saunders then later moved to the La Crosse Catbirds for five seasons (1989–94), where he won two CBA championships in 1990 and 1992. He coached in 1994–95 with the Sioux Falls Skyforce. He also served as general manager (1991–93) and team president (1991–94) of the Catbirds. Saunders' impressive CBA tenure included seven consecutive seasons of 30 or more victories, two CBA championships (1990, 1992), two CBA Coach of the Year honors (1989, 1992) and 23 CBA-to-NBA player promotions.

Saunders would leave after seven productive seasons as a head coach in the CBA, where he ranks second with 253 career victories.

=== Minnesota Timberwolves (NBA) ===
Saunders joined the Minnesota Timberwolves of the National Basketball Association (NBA) on May 11, 1995, as general manager, working under his former Minnesota teammate, Kevin McHale. On December 18, 1995, Saunders was named head coach of the Timberwolves, replacing Bill Blair.

This happened shortly after McHale had taken over the basketball operations for the Timberwolves. He then added the coaching duties to his GM responsibilities after the team had gotten off to a 6–14 start. The Timberwolves went 20–42 the rest of the year, but the emergence of young Kevin Garnett as a front-line NBA player was a huge plus over the second half of the season.

He guided with difficulty the Timberwolves to their first-ever playoff berth in the 1996–97 season, his first full season as an NBA head coach. A year later, he led the Timberwolves to their first-ever winning season. They went on to a franchise-record 50 victories in 1999–2000 which was duplicated in 2001–2002.

After the Timberwolves' success in the 2003–04 NBA season, in which they won their first (and to date, only) division title and advanced to the Western Conference finals, they struggled in the 2004–05 season. On February 12, 2005, McHale fired Saunders and named himself head coach for the rest of the season. McHale was unable to right the ship, and the Wolves finished one game out of the playoffs, the first time they had missed the playoffs in nine years. Many fans believed that Saunders' firing was unwarranted, citing instead the contract troubles of Sam Cassell and Latrell Sprewell as the reasons for the team's failure. However, many also acknowledged that Saunders had coached ten years in Minnesota, and perhaps a new voice was needed.

=== Detroit Pistons (NBA) ===
Saunders replaced Larry Brown as coach of the Detroit Pistons on July 21, 2005. In his first season in Detroit, Saunders coached the Eastern Conference All-Stars in the 2006 NBA All-Star Game in Houston, Texas, and the Pistons became just the fifth team in NBA history to have four All-Stars in the same season (Ben Wallace, Rasheed Wallace, Rip Hamilton and Chauncey Billups). After a 70-point first half performance from the Western Conference All-Stars, Saunders notably played all four Pistons for majority of the second half, to propel a defensive turnaround that allowed the East to overcome a 21-point deficit and win the game. The Pistons finished 64–18—their best record in franchise history—and the best record in the NBA that season. The Pistons defeated the Milwaukee Bucks in five games in the first round, and the Cleveland Cavaliers in seven games to reach the Eastern Conference finals before losing to the eventual NBA champions Miami Heat.

The following season, despite losing four-time All-Star and four-time Defensive Player of the Year Ben Wallace to free agency, Saunders led Detroit to a 53–29 record, good for first in the East. Once again the Pistons were able to reach the Eastern Conference finals, but they were defeated by the Cleveland Cavaliers in six games.

The 2007–08 season saw the Pistons finish with their third-best record in franchise history at 59–23. Detroit did not finish first in the Eastern Conference as they had the previous two seasons, instead finishing as the second seed for the playoffs. Saunders did still lead them to the Eastern Conference finals once again, but they lost to the Boston Celtics, who went on to win the NBA Finals that year.

On June 3, 2008, just days after the loss to the Celtics, Saunders was fired as head coach. Pistons president of basketball operations Joe Dumars said the team needed a "new voice". According to a post-mortem by ESPN's Chris Sheridan, Saunders never really earned the respect of the Pistons locker room, and was unable to get them to raise their game at crucial moments. Chauncey Billups, who played for Saunders in Minnesota as well as Detroit, refuted Sheridan's report.

In his three years in Detroit, Saunders led the Pistons to three consecutive Central Division titles and three consecutive appearances in the Eastern Conference finals (part of a run of six consecutive Conference finals appearances dating to 2002–03). Until the 2025-26 season, the Pistons did not win another division title.

=== Washington Wizards (NBA) ===
On April 14, 2009, Saunders reached an agreement to become the new coach of the Washington Wizards. The deal was reportedly worth $18 million over 4 years.

On January 24, 2012, Saunders was fired as the coach of the Wizards. Replaced by former Minnesota Timberwolves head coach Randy Wittman, Saunders departed the Wizards with a record of 51–130.

=== Second stint with Minnesota Timberwolves ===
On June 6, 2014, Saunders was named the head coach of the Minnesota Timberwolves, returning to the franchise for a second stint. During his second stint with the Timberwolves, Saunders was diagnosed with Hodgkin's lymphoma. During his recovery, he delegated his coaching position to assistant coach and former NBA Coach of the Year winner Sam Mitchell. His 427 wins during parts of ten seasons in two stints are the most in franchise history and, until the 2017–18 season, he was the only coach to lead the Timberwolves to a winning season or coach a playoff game.

== Career as an executive ==
=== Boston Celtics (NBA) ===
On April 29, 2012, Saunders joined the Boston Celtics as an advisor.

=== Return to Timberwolves ===
On May 3, 2013, Saunders was named the Timberwolves' President of Basketball Operations. On June 5, 2014, Saunders was named head coach as well. During his recovery from Hodgkin's Lymphoma, he delegated his duties within the front office to the team's general manager Milt Newton.

== Personal life ==
Saunders and his wife Debbie had four children. Their son, Ryan, is a former guard for the University of Minnesota, Flip's alma mater, and later became an NBA assistant coach for the Wizards and Wolves, the head coach of the Wolves and won an NBA championship as an assistant coach for the Denver Nuggets in 2023. His daughter, Mindy also attended the University of Minnesota and was a member of the dance team. Flip's twin daughters, Kim and Rachel, also attended the University of Minnesota. Together, they danced on the University of Minnesota Dance Team for 4 years – winning 8 national championships and a World Championship.

According to Saunders, he was about 20 yards (18 m) (60 feet) away from the I-35W Mississippi River bridge collapse on August 1, 2007, in Minneapolis.

== Death ==
On August 11, 2015, Saunders announced he had been diagnosed with Hodgkin's lymphoma, for which he was undergoing treatment. Saunders planned to remain the Timberwolves' head coach and president. However, after Saunders was hospitalized for more than a month following complications in September, team owner Glen Taylor announced that Saunders would miss the next season. Saunders died on October 25, 2015, at the age of 60. On February 15, 2018, the Timberwolves held a "Flip Saunders Night" during which a permanent banner was unveiled in the Target Center honoring Saunders. A little over three years after his death, Flip's son Ryan Saunders took over as the Timberwolves' head coach following the firing of Tom Thibodeau.

On January 4, 2020, the south gymnasium at Cuyahoga Heights High School in Cuyahoga Heights, Ohio was renamed in Flip's honor. The event was attended by Flip's wife Debbie Saunders, Flip's son and former Minnesota Timberwolves head coach Ryan Saunders, other members of the Saunders' family as well as by the entire 2020 Minnesota Timberwolves basketball team.

== Head coaching record ==
Legend
Regular season	G	Games coached	W	Games won	L	Games lost	W–L %	Win–loss %
Playoffs	PG	Playoff games	PW	Playoff wins	PL	Playoff losses	PW–L %	Playoff win–loss %

Team	Year	G	W	L	W–L%	Finish	PG	PW	PL	PW–L%	Result
Minnesota	1995–96	62	20	42	.323	6th in Midwest	—	—	—	—	Missed playoffs
Minnesota	1996–97	82	40	42	.488	3rd in Midwest	3	0	3	.000	Lost in First round
Minnesota	1997–98	82	45	37	.549	3rd in Midwest	5	2	3	.400	Lost in First round
Minnesota	1998–99	50	25	25	.500	4th in Midwest	4	1	3	.250	Lost in First round
Minnesota	1999–2000	82	50	32	.610	3rd in Midwest	4	1	3	.250	Lost in First round
Minnesota	2000–01	82	47	35	.573	4th in Midwest	4	1	3	.250	Lost in First round
Minnesota	2001–02	82	50	32	.610	3rd in Midwest	3	0	3	.000	Lost in First round
Minnesota	2002–03	82	51	31	.622	3rd in Midwest	6	2	4	.333	Lost in First round
Minnesota	2003–04	82	58	24	.707	1st in Midwest	18	10	8	.556	Lost in Conference finals
Minnesota	2004–05	51	25	26	.490	(fired)	—	—	—	—	—
Detroit	2005–06	82	64	18	.780	1st in Central	18	10	8	.556	Lost in Conference finals
Detroit	2006–07	82	53	29	.646	1st in Central	16	10	6	.625	Lost in Conference finals
Detroit	2007–08	82	59	23	.720	1st in Central	17	10	7	.588	Lost in Conference finals
Washington	2009–10	82	26	56	.317	5th in Southeast	—	—	—	—	Missed playoffs
Washington	2010–11	82	23	59	.280	5th in Southeast	—	—	—	—	Missed playoffs
Washington	2011–12	17	2	15	.118	(fired)	—	—	—	—	—
Minnesota	2014–15	82	16	66	.195	5th in Northwest	—	—	—	—	Missed playoffs
Career		1,248	654	592	.525		98	47	51	.480	
