= Zac Lowther =

American baseball player (born 1996)

Bravos de León – No. 59
- Pitcher
- Born: April 30, 1996 (age 30); Middleburg Heights, Ohio, U.S.
- Bats: Left Throws: Left

Professional debut
- MLB: April 25, 2021, for the Baltimore Orioles
- CPBL: April 3, 2025, for the Wei Chuan Dragons

MLB statistics (through 2022 season)
- Win–loss record: 1–3
- Earned run average: 6.94
- Strikeouts: 31

CPBL statistics (through 2025 season)
- Win–loss record: 3–6
- Earned run average: 3.12
- Strikeouts: 81
- Stats at Baseball Reference

Teams
- Baltimore Orioles (2021–2022); Wei Chuan Dragons (2025)

Zacary William Lowther (/ˈlaʊθər/ LAU-ther; born April 30, 1996) is an American professional baseball pitcher for the Bravos de León of the Mexican League. He has previously played in Major League Baseball (MLB) for the Baltimore Orioles and in the Chinese Professional Baseball League (CPBL) for the Wei Chuan Dragons.

== Amateur career ==
Lowther attended Cuyahoga Heights High School in Cuyahoga Heights, Ohio, and played as a pitcher for their baseball team. He also started on the varsity football team for two seasons. In three years on the varsity team, Lowther had a 12–2 win–loss record, a 0.71 earned run average (ERA), and 201 strikeouts. He enrolled at Xavier University and played college baseball for the Xavier Musketeers. He led the Big East Conference with 86 strikeouts in 2016, his sophomore year. That summer, he played collegiate summer baseball for the Brewster Whitecaps of the Cape Cod Baseball League, where he was named a league all-star and led the league with 54 strikeouts. In 2017, Lowther set a Xavier single-season record with 123 strikeouts and was named to the All-Big East Conference team.

== Professional career ==
=== Baltimore Orioles ===
The Baltimore Orioles selected Lowther in the second round, with the 74th overall selection, of the 2017 MLB draft. He became the highest draft pick from Xavier's baseball program. Lowther signed with the Orioles, receiving a $779,500 signing bonus. He pitched for the Aberdeen IronBirds of the Low–A New York-Penn League after he signed, going 2–2 with a 1.66 ERA in 12 games (11 starts). He began the 2018 season with the Delmarva Shorebirds of the Single–A South Atlantic League. In May, the Orioles promoted Lowther to the Frederick Keys of the High–A Carolina League and he finished the season there. In 23 games (22 starts) between the two clubs, he pitched to an 8–4 record with a 2.18 ERA.

During the 2019 season, Lowther played for the Bowie Baysox of the Double–A Eastern League, going 13–7 with a 2.55 ERA over 26 starts, striking out 154 batters over 148 innings. Lowther did not play in a game in 2020 due to the cancellation of the Minor League Baseball season because of the COVID-19 pandemic. On November 20, 2020, Lowther was added to the 40-man roster.

Lowther began the 2021 season at the Orioles' alternate site in Bowie. On April 25, 2021, Lowther was promoted to the major leagues for the first time. He made his MLB debut that day against the Oakland Athletics, pitching a scoreless ninth inning. The next day, the Orioles optioned Lowther back to their alternate site. The Orioles assigned him to the Norfolk Tides of the Triple–A International League, and then promoted him to the major leagues for his first start on May 8; he allowed seven runs in two innings pitched. Lowther returned to Norfolk after the game, and was promoted back to the major leagues in June.

Lowther competed for a spot in the Orioles starting rotation in 2022, but began the season with Norfolk. Lowther made 1 appearance with the Orioles, pitching 5.1 innings with 5 earned runs, and was designated for assignment on June 15 following the claiming of Jonathan Araúz. He cleared waivers and was sent outright to Triple-A Norfolk on June 22. He made 17 total appearances for Norfolk in 2022, struggling to a 10.31 ERA with 46 strikeouts in 43 2/3 innings pitched.

Lowther missed the start of the 2023 season due to injury, and began a rehab assignment with the rookie–level Florida Complex League Orioles in June. After one appearance, Lowther was released by the Orioles organization on June 9, 2023.

=== Gastonia Baseball Club ===
On April 18, 2024, Lowther signed with the Gastonia Baseball Club of the Atlantic League of Professional Baseball. In 11 starts for Gastonia, Lowther compiled a 4–0 record and 2.82 ERA with 74 strikeouts across 54 1/3 innings pitched.

=== Toros de Tijuana ===
On July 3, 2024, Lowther's contract was purchased by the Toros de Tijuana of the Mexican League. In 5 games (4 starts) for Tijuana, he posted a 2–1 record and 2.19 ERA with 40 strikeouts across 24 2/3 innings pitched.

=== Wei Chuan Dragons ===
On January 15, 2025, Lowther signed with the Wei Chuan Dragons of the Chinese Professional Baseball League. He made 19 starts for the Dragons, compiling a 3-6 record and 3.12 ERA with 81 strikeouts across 109 2/3 innings pitched. Lowther became a free agent following the season.

=== Toros de Tijuana (second stint) ===
On April 18, 2026, Lowther signed with the Toros de Tijuana of the Mexican League. In two starts, he posted an 0–1 record with a 4.05 ERA, five walks, and six strikeouts across 6 2/3 innings pitched.

=== Bravos de León ===
On May 5, 2026, Lowther was traded to the Bravos de León of the Mexican League.

== Personal life ==
Lowther's father, Marc, coached him from the time he was six years old through his career at Cuyahoga Heights. He and his wife, Brianna, have one daughter, born in January 2021.
