= Hsiao I-chieh =

Taiwanese baseball player

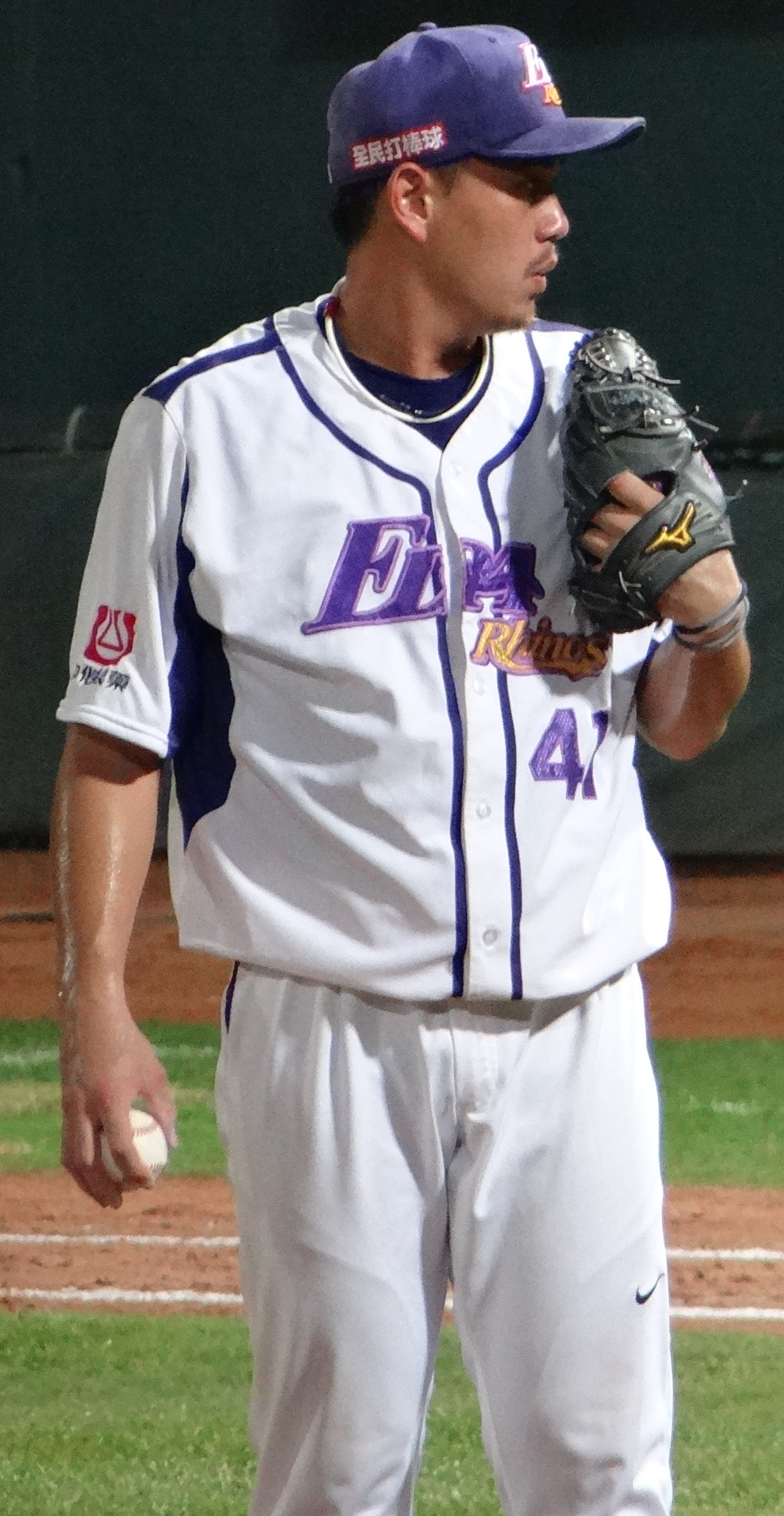

Wei Chuan Dragons – No. 89
- Pitcher / Pitching Coach
- Born: January 2, 1986 (age 39); Pingtung, Pingtung, Taiwan
- Bats: Right Throws: Right

Professional debut
- NPB: August 11, 2011, for the Hanshin Tigers
- CPBL: March 22, 2014, for the EDA Rhinos

NPB statistics
- Win–loss record: 0–1
- Earned run average: 2.16
- Strikeouts: 7

CPBL statistics
- Win–loss record: 6–9
- Earned run average: 4.18
- Strikeouts: 102

Teams
- As player: Hanshin Tigers (2009–2012); Fukuoka SoftBank Hawks (2013); EDA Rhinos/Fubon Guardians (2014–2018); As coach: Wei Chuan Dragons (2020–present)

Hsiao I-chieh

Chinese name
- Traditional Chinese: 蕭一傑
- Simplified Chinese: 萧一杰
Transcriptions
Standard Mandarin
- Hanyu Pinyin: Xiāo Yījié
- Gwoyeu Romatzyh: Shiau Ijye
- Wade–Giles: Hsiao^{1} I^{1}-chieh^{2}

Japanese name
- Kanji: 蕭一傑
- Hiragana: しょう・いっけつ
- Katakana: シャオ・イージェ
Transcriptions
- Romanization: Shou Ikketsu

Hsiao I-chieh (Chinese: 蕭一傑; pinyin: Xiāo Yījié; born January 2, 1986), also known as Ikketsu Shoh, is a Taiwanese former professional baseball pitcher who played in the NPB and CPBL.

== Early life ==
Hsiao was born into a baseball family that spans three generations. Fascinated with the Kōshien tournaments and encouraged to study abroad by his father, Hsiao decided to leave Kao-Yuan Vocational High School of Technology & Commerce after six months, and transferred to Nichinan Gakuen Junior and Senior High School in 2002. He entered Nara Sangyo University, whose baseball club is an affiliate of Kinki University in the Kansai Big Six Baseball League, and Hsiao became a high NPB draft prospect for allowing no runs in 34 innings during his senior year.

== Professional career ==
=== Hanshin Tigers ===
Hsiao was drafted in the first round of the 2008 NPB draft by the Hanshin Tigers, who missed out on Keijiro Matsumoto and Hiromichi Fujiwara, and signed a tentative contract for ¥90 million yen on December 8, 2008. He was an eligible candidate for the Chinese Taipei national baseball team in the 2009 World Baseball Classic, but Australian team candidate Grant Karlsen threw a ball that injured Hsiao's right arm in a practice match, ultimately forcing Hsiao to decline the offer.

After failing to remain on the Hanshin Tigers first squad, Hsiao was released on October 2, 2012.

=== Fukuoka SoftBank Hawks ===
At the request of Taiwanese pitching coach Kuo Tai-yuan, the Fukuoka SoftBank Hawks acquired Hsiao as a developmental player on November 22, 2012. Hsiao was released on October 26, 2013.

=== EDA Rhinos/Fubon Guardians ===
Hsiao was drafted in the third round of the 2013 CBPL rookie draft by the EDA Rhinos, signing a 3-year multi-year contract on January 10, 2014. Immediately after the Fubon Guardians released him, Hsiao decided to end his decade-long professional career and retired on December 5, 2018.

== After retirement ==
Following his retirement, Hsiao became Wang Po-jung's personal interpreter for the Hokkaido Nippon-Ham Fighters for the 2019 season. He left the position after his wife gave birth to a newborn, deciding to return to Taiwan in order to stay close with his family.

In 2020, Hsiao was hired a second squad pitching coach for the revived Wei Chuan Dragons.
