= Cuyahoga Heights High School =

Public high school in Cuyahoga Heights, Ohio, United States

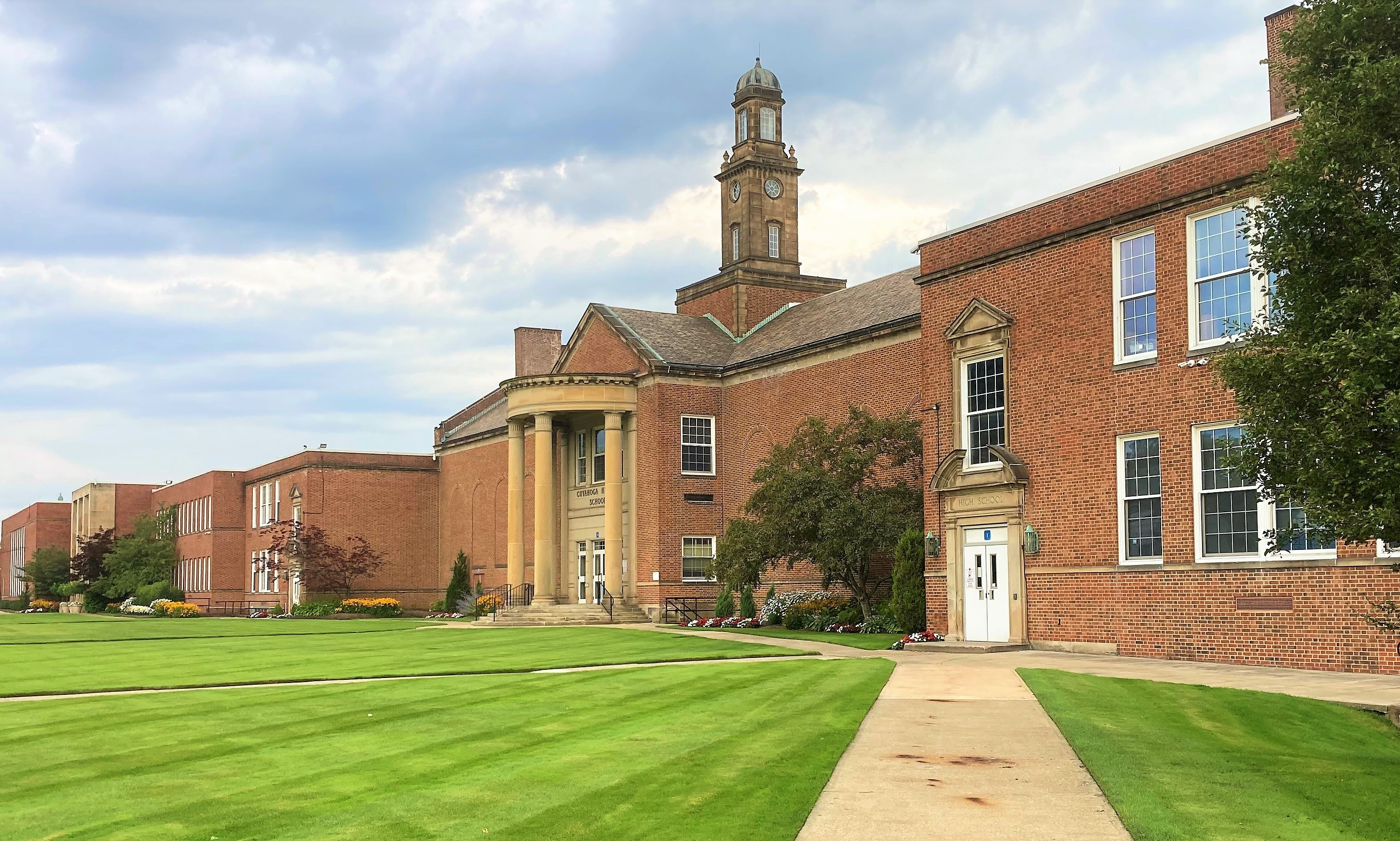

Location
- 4820 East 71st Street; Cuyahoga Heights, (Cuyahoga County), Ohio 44125; United States; 41°25′38″N 81°38′33″W

Information
- Type: Public high school
- Established: 1938
- Status: Open
- Superintendent: Matt Young
- Principal: Scott DeTray
- Teaching staff: 26.03 (FTE)
- Grades: 9-12
- Enrollment: 255 (2023–2024)
- Student to teacher ratio: 9.80
- Colors: Scarlet and gray
- Slogan: “Never Given Always Earned”
- Fight song: "Across the Field"
- Athletics conference: Chagrin Valley Conference
- Sports: Baseball, Football, Soccer, Track, Basketball, Swimming, Golf, Cross Country, Indoor Track, Gymnastics, Volleyball, and Softball
- Mascot: Red wolf
- Nickname: Red Wolves
- Rivals: Independence Blue Devils and Kirtland Hornets
- USNWR ranking: 91st within Ohio
- Newspaper: Chieftain
- Yearbook: Cayugan
- Annual tuition: $1,250 (Pre-K), $2,500 (K-5), $3,500 (6-8), $5,500 (9-12)
- Website: hs.cuyhts.org/o/chhs

Cuyahoga Heights High School is a public high school located in Cuyahoga Heights, Ohio, United States. It serves the villages of Cuyahoga Heights, Valley View, and Brooklyn Heights. It is a Blue Ribbon School of Excellence.

== Athletics ==
=== Ohio High School Athletic Association State Championships ===
- Girls' softball - 2014

=== Mascot change ===
By unanimous vote of the Board of Education in August 2021, the outdated name "Redskins" was removed immediately. Until a new mascot was selected, the school was known as "Heights". On March 23, 2022 the new mascot was revealed and the school will go forward as the "Red Wolves".

== Notable alumni ==
- Zach D'Orazio — former NFL wide receiver
- Dylan Drummond — wide receiver for the Detroit Lions
- Zac Lowther — baseball player for the Baltimore Orioles Organization
- Jason Popson — musician, rapper, and vocalist for the band Mushroomhead
- Flip Saunders — NBA basketball player and coach
- Jack Squirek — former NFL linebacker
- Kelli Stack — member of the United States women's national ice hockey silver medal team
