= Dylan Drummond =

American football player (born 2000)

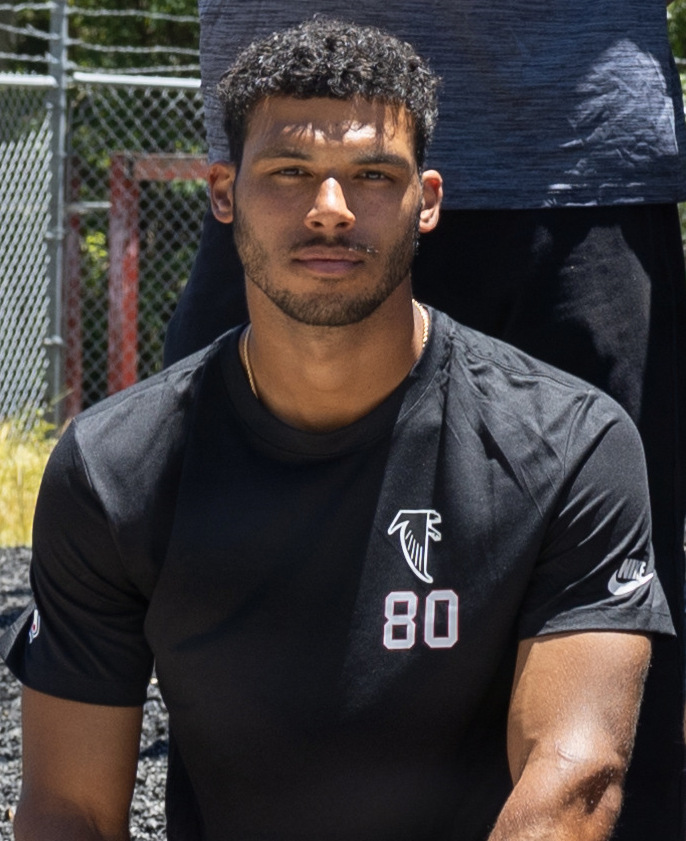
- Drummond in 2026

No. 80 – Atlanta Falcons
- Position: Wide receiver
- Roster status: Practice squad

Personal information
- Born: January 17, 2000 (age 26); Cleveland, Ohio, U.S.
- Listed height: 6 ft 0 in (1.83 m)
- Listed weight: 190 lb (86 kg)

Career information
- High school: Cuyahoga Heights (Cuyahoga Heights, Ohio)
- College: Eastern Michigan (2018–2022)
- NFL draft: 2023: undrafted

Career history
- Detroit Lions (2023); New York Giants (2023)*; Atlanta Falcons (2024–present)
- * Offseason or practice squad member only

Career NFL statistics as of 2025
- Receptions: 7
- Receiving yards: 42
- Stats at Pro Football Reference

Dylan Drummond (born January 17, 2000) is an American professional football wide receiver for the Atlanta Falcons of the National Football League (NFL). He played college football for the Eastern Michigan Eagles.

== Professional career ==
Pre-draft measurables
Height	Weight	Arm length	Hand span	Wingspan	40-yard dash	10-yard split	20-yard split	20-yard shuttle	Three-cone drill	Vertical jump	Broad jump	Bench press
6 ft 0 3/8 in (1.84 m)	194 lb (88 kg)	31 in (0.79 m)	9 in (0.23 m)	6 ft 3 1/4 in (1.91 m)	4.62 s	1.67 s	2.63 s	4.33 s	6.86 s	33.0 in (0.84 m)	9 ft 9 in (2.97 m)	11 reps
All values from Pro Day

=== Detroit Lions ===
On May 15, 2023, the Detroit Lions signed Drummond to a three-year, $2.695 million contract as an undrafted free agent. He was waived on August 29, and re-signed to the practice squad. Drummond was elevated to the active roster for the team's Week 5 game against the Carolina Panthers and made his NFL debut in the win. He was released on November 29.

=== New York Giants ===
On November 30, 2023, Drummond was signed to the New York Giants' practice squad. He was not signed to a reserve/future contract and thus became a free agent at the end of the season.

=== Atlanta Falcons ===
On May 13, 2024, Drummond signed with the Atlanta Falcons. He was waived on August 27, and re-signed to the practice squad. Drummond signed a reserve/future contract with Atlanta on January 6, 2025.

On August 26, 2025, Drummond was waived by the Falcons as part of final roster cuts and re-signed to the practice squad the next day. He was promoted to the active roster on November 28.

On August 30, 2026, Drummond was waived by the Falcons as a part of final roster cuts; he was re-signed to the team's practice squad the next day.
