= Jack Squirek =

American football player (1959–2024)

No. 58, 53
- Position: Linebacker

Personal information
- Born: February 16, 1959; Cleveland, Ohio, U.S.
- Died: January 5, 2024 (aged 64)
- Listed height: 6 ft 4 in (1.93 m)
- Listed weight: 230 lb (104 kg)

Career information
- High school: Cuyahoga Heights (Cuyahoga Heights, Ohio)
- College: Illinois
- NFL draft: 1982: 2nd round, 35th overall pick

Career history
- Los Angeles Raiders (1982–1985); Miami Dolphins (1986); San Diego Chargers (1987)*
- * Offseason or practice squad member only

Awards and highlights
- Super Bowl champion (XVIII); Second-team All-Big Ten (1981)

Career NFL statistics
- Sacks: 3
- Fumble recoveries: 2
- Interceptions: 1
- Stats at Pro Football Reference

Jack Steve Squirek (February 16, 1959 – January 5, 2024) was an American football player who was a linebacker in the National Football League (NFL) for the Los Angeles Raiders from 1982 to 1986 and for the Miami Dolphins in 1986. He played college football for the Illinois Fighting Illini. He won a Super Bowl with the Raiders.

== NFL career ==
Squirek's most famous play is his interception in Super Bowl XVIII against the Washington Redskins: before the end of the first half, a Raiders drive stalled when Jim Plunkett's third down pass was incomplete, but Ray Guy's 27-yard punt pinned Washington at their own 12-yard line with 12 seconds left in the half. On the next play, Squirek intercepted Joe Theismann's screen pass and returned it for a touchdown to give the Raiders a 21–3 halftime lead. The Raiders went on to win, 38–9.

== Retirement ==
Squirek lived in the Cleveland area following his playing days, with his wife, Penny, and their two children, Jacob and Cassandra. He ran a cleaning and janitorial service in that area. Squirek died on January 5, 2024, at the age of 64.
