= Sandro Fabian =

Dominican baseball player (born 1998)

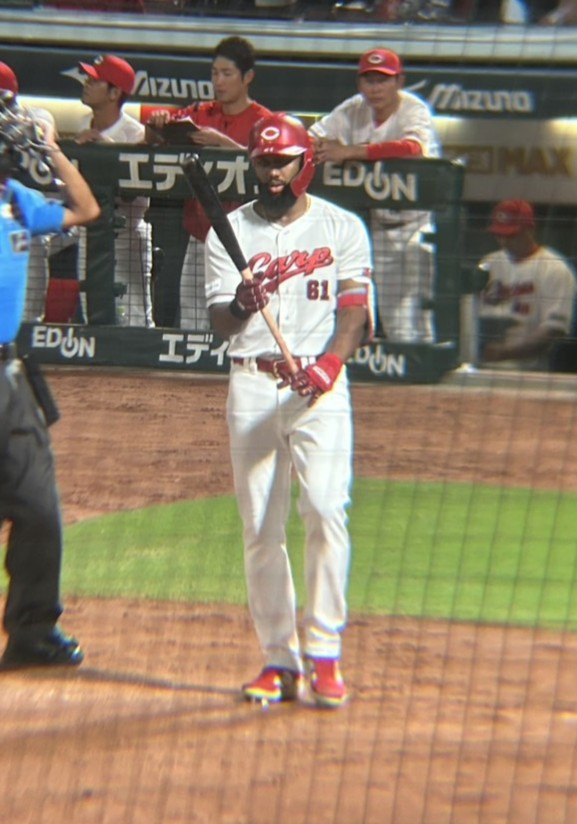
- Fabian with the Hiroshima Toyo Carp in 2025

Hiroshima Toyo Carp – No. 61
- Outfielder
- Born: March 6, 1998 (age 28); Santo Domingo, Dominican Republic
- Bats: Right Throws: Right

Professional debut
- MLB: September 6, 2024, for the Texas Rangers
- NPB: March 28, 2025, for the Hiroshima Toyo Carp

MLB statistics (through 2024 season)
- Batting average: .000
- Home runs: 0
- Runs batted in: 0

NPB statistics (through August 18, 2026)
- Batting average: .259
- Home runs: 32
- Runs batted in: 99
- Stats at Baseball Reference

Teams
- Texas Rangers (2024); Hiroshima Toyo Carp (2025–present)

Career highlights and awards
- NPB All-Star (2025)
Medals
Men's baseball
Representing Dominican Republic
Junior Pan American Games
Silver medal – second place	2021 Cali-Valle	Team

Sandro Fabian Peña (born March 6, 1998) is a Dominican professional baseball outfielder for the Hiroshima Toyo Carp of Nippon Professional Baseball (NPB). He has previously played in Major League Baseball (MLB) for the Texas Rangers. He made his MLB debut in 2024.

== Career ==
=== San Francisco Giants ===
On July 2, 2014, Fabian signed with the San Francisco Giants as an international free agent. He made his professional debut in 2015 with the Dominican Summer League Giants. In 2016 with the rookie–level Arizona League Giants, Fabian slashed .340/.364/.522 with two home runs and 35 RBI over 42 games.

Fabian spent the 2017 season with the Single–A Augusta GreenJackets, playing in 122 games and hitting .277/.297/.408 with 11 home runs and 61 RBI. He played in 112 games for the High–A San Jose Giants in 2018, batting .200/.260/.325 with 10 home runs and 35 RBI. Fabian split 2019 between the AZL Giants and San Jose, slashing a combined .276/.355/.427 with seven home runs and 41 RBI.

Fabian did not play in a game in 2020 due to the cancellation of the minor league season because of the COVID-19 pandemic. He returned to action in 2021 with the Double–A Richmond Flying Squirrels, hitting .264/.297/.466 with a career–high 15 home runs and 55 RBI across 90 appearances. Fabian elected free agency following the season on November 7, 2021.

=== Texas Rangers ===
On March 8, 2022, Fabian signed a minor league contract with the Texas Rangers organization. He split the 2022 campaign between the Double–A Frisco RoughRiders and Triple–A Round Rock Express. In 101 games for the two affiliates, Fabian batted .245/.313/.455 with 16 home runs and 56 RBI. He elected free agency following the season on November 10.

On January 6, 2023, Fabian re–signed with Texas on a new minor league contract. He played in 117 games for Triple–A Round Rock, slashing .288/.331/.523 with career–highs in home runs (23) and RBI (78). Fabian elected free agency following the season on November 6.

On November 22, 2023, Fabian again re–signed with the Rangers organization on a minor league contract. He played in 116 games for Round Rock in 2024, hitting .270/.343/.462 with 17 home runs and 81 RBI. On September 4, 2024, the Rangers promoted Fabian to the major leagues. In three games, he batted 0–for–5.

=== Hiroshima Toyo Carp ===
On November 20, 2024, Fabian signed a three–year, $5.8 million contract with the Hiroshima Toyo Carp of Nippon Professional Baseball.
