= Wei Chuan Dragons =

Taiwanese professional baseball team

- 味全龍
Logo
Cap insignia

Information
- League: Chinese Professional Baseball League
- Location: Taipei City (1989–1999, 2021–present); Hsinchu (2022–present)
- Ballpark: Taipei Municipal Baseball Stadium (1989–1999); Tianmu Baseball Stadium (2021–present); Hsinchu Baseball Stadium (2022–present)
- Founded: 1989; 2019 (refounded)
- Taiwan Series championships: 1990, 1997, 1998, 1999, 2023, 2026
- League championships: 1990^{2} • 1991^{1} • 1996^{2} • 1997^{2} • 2023^{2} • 2026^{1}
- Playoff berths: 9 (1990, 1991, 1996, 1997, 1998, 1999, 2022, 2023, 2026)
- Colors: Red
- Mascot: Weddie
- Retired numbers: 85
- Manager: Yeh Chun-chang

Current uniforms
Home	Away

The Wei Chuan Dragons (Chinese: 味全龍; pinyin: Wèiquán Lóng; Pe̍h-ōe-jī: Bī-chôan-liông) are a Taiwanese professional baseball team. They are a member of Taiwan's Chinese Professional Baseball League (CPBL). The team originally existed between 1990 and 1999. In 2019, negotiations were held to revive the franchise and return to the CPBL. They played one season of minor league baseball in 2020 and rejoined the CPBL in 2021.

The Dragons have won the Taiwan Series championship six times, in 1990, 1997, 1998, 1999, 2023 and 2026.

== History ==
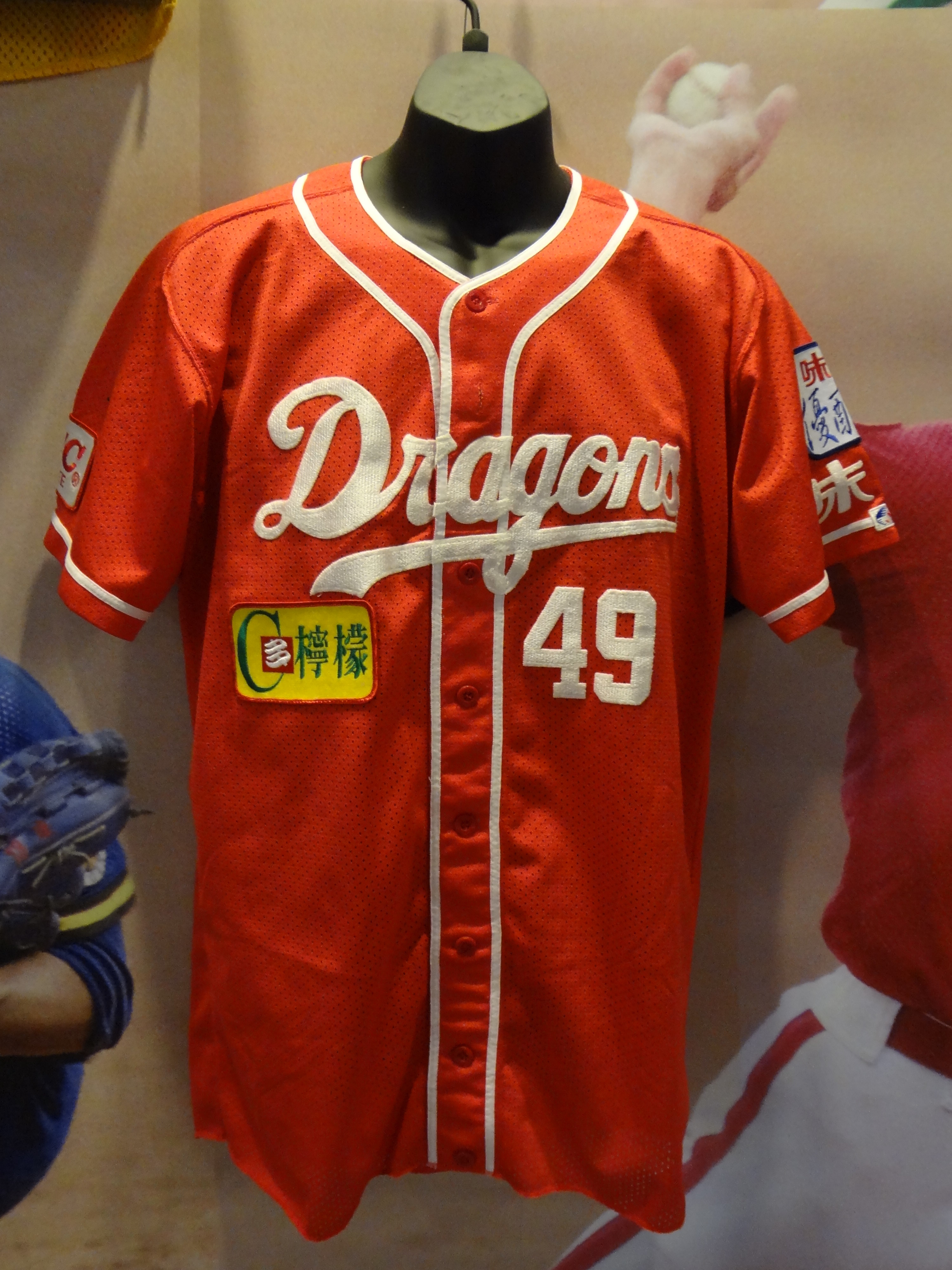
Wei Chuan Dragons uniform

Wei Chuan Dragons had a long amateur history when its parent company, the Wei Chuan Foods Corporation, started sponsoring Chinese Culture University's baseball team in the late 1970s. After these student players graduated, Wei-Chuan formed an amateur team to allow them to continue playing baseball in 1978; it was this team that later professionalized to become one of the first four teams of the Chinese Professional Baseball League (CPBL). Due to the club's long history in the amateur era, its matches often attracted large crowds, and games with the Brother Elephants, another popular team, were often sold out. The team played at the now-demolished Taipei Municipal Baseball Stadium.

During the 1990s, the club won the CPBL championship four times, in 1990, 1997, 1998 and 1999, and by the end of the 1999 season became the team with the most CPBL championship titles. In 1999, Wei Chuan Food Corporation announced its decision to disband the club, mainly because the Ting Hsin International Group, who became the largest shareholder of Wei Chuan Food Corporation in 1998, did not show interest in supporting the baseball club.

In 2019, 20 years after the disbandment, the club was re-established and played the 2020 season in the minor league, before rejoining the CPBL in 2021. In 2023, the Dragons defeated Rakuten Monkeys in the 2023 Taiwan Series with four wins in seven games to win their fifth championship, 24 years since their last championship.

== Records ==
Qualified for playoffs	Taiwan Series Championship

Regular seasons

Season	First half-season					Second half-season				
Season	Wins	Losses	Ties	Pct.	Place	Wins	Losses	Ties	Pct.	Place
1990	25	20	0	.556	2	27	14	4	.659	1
1991	26	17	2	.605	1	20	19	6	.513	2
1992	23	20	2	.535	2	18	22	5	.450	4
1993	26	19	0	.578	2	22	21	2	.512	3
1994	17	27	1	.386	5	19	25	1	.432	4
1995	25	25	0	.500	3	22	27	1	.449	5
1996	25	23	2	.521	4	30	20	0	.600	1
1997	15	31	2	.326	7	31	15	2	.674	1
1998	56	48	1	.538	3	No half-seasons				
1999	49	39	4	.557	3	No half-seasons				
2021	22	36	2	.379	5	28	31	1	.475	3
2022	31	29	0	.517	4	26	29	5	.473	4
2023	30	27	3	.526	2	32	26	2	.552	1
2024	26	34	0	.433	5	32	28	0	.533	2
2025	29	31	0	.483	5	26	33	1	.441	5
2026	39	21	0	.650	1	28	32	0	.467	4

Playoffs

Season	First round			Taiwan Series		
Season	Opponent	Wins	Losses	Opponent	Wins	Losses
1990	Did not play			Mercuries Tigers	4	2
1991	Did not play			Uni-President Lions	3	4
1996	Did not play			Uni-President Lions	2	4
1997	Did not play			China Times Eagles	4	2
1998	Uni-President Lions	2	1	Sinon Bulls	4	3
1999	Uni-President Lions	2	1	Chinatrust Whales	4	1
2022	CTBC Brothers	1	3	Eliminated		
2023	Did not play			Rakuten Monkeys	4	3
2026	Did not play			CTBC Brothers	4	2

== Roster ==
Wei Chuan Dragons roster
Players			Coaches
Pitchers: 0 (Taiwan) Li Chao; 5 (Taiwan) Chen Yu-hsun; 15 (Taiwan) Yang Yu-siang; 16 (Taiwan) Wang Wei-chung; 17 (Taiwan) Kuo Yu-cheng; 18 (Taiwan) Hsu Jo-hsi; 20 (Taiwan) Wu Chun-chieh; 33 (United States) Zac Lowther; 35 (United States) Tyler Eppler; 37 (United States) Drew Gagnon; 39 (Taiwan) Lu Wei-cheng; 41 (Taiwan) Zheng Yi-xuan; 42 (Taiwan) Zhao Jing-long; 43 (Taiwan) Yao En-duo; 45 (Taiwan) Chen Chih-chieh; 47 (Taiwan) Sung Wen-hua; 48 (Taiwan) Lin Yi-da; 51 (Taiwan) Chang Jin-yu; 52 (United States) Bryan Woodall; 55 (United States) Aaron Leasher; 56 (Colombia) Jasier Herrera; 59 (Taiwan) Chen Kuan-wei; 67 (Taiwan) Tsao Yu-chi; 68 (Taiwan) Lo Hua-wei; 71 (Taiwan) Lin Tzu-yu; 74 (Taiwan) Zhang Jun-shou; 77 (Taiwan) Lin Hsin-jie; 78 (Taiwan) Wu Jun-yi; 90 (Taiwan) Wang Ting-ying; 99 (Taiwan) Lin Kai-wei; 00 (Taiwan) Weng Wei-chun; 104 (Taiwan) Huang Jun-cheng; 106 (Taiwan) Lin Bo-you; 107 (Taiwan) Wang Bo-yang; 122 (Taiwan) Lee Chin-lin; 124 (Taiwan) Hsueh Yu-da; 128 (Taiwan) Wu Cheng-hen; 129 (Taiwan) Chen Po-an; 999 (Taiwan) Lee Cheng-feng	Catchers: 4 (Taiwan) Giljegiljaw Kungkuan; 9 (Taiwan) Lin Chen-hsun; 22 (Taiwan) Chuan Hao-wei; 60 (Taiwan) Liu Shih-hao; 63 (Taiwan) Jiang Shao-hong; 65 (Taiwan) Wu Bing-an; 123 (Taiwan) Huang Zan-wei; 125 (Taiwan) Liu Yao-hao; Infielders: 3 (Taiwan) Masegesege Abalrini; 6 (Taiwan) Kuo Yen-wen; 10 (Taiwan) Huang Po-hao; 21 (Taiwan) Li Kai-wei; 23 (Taiwan) Liu Jun-wei; 25 (Taiwan) Chang Cheng-yu; 26 (Taiwan) Yang Nian-zu; 31 (Taiwan) Ngayaw Ake; 36 (Taiwan) Li Chan-yi; 44 (Taiwan) John Peter Clark; 46 (Taiwan) Liu Ji-hong; 57 (Taiwan) Namoh Iyang; 61 (Taiwan) Wu Tung-jung; 72 (Taiwan) Shih Hsiang-yu; 88 (Taiwan) Chou Wei-hung; 127 (Taiwan) Hsu Tzu-chien	Outfielders: 1 (Taiwan) Chen Tzu-hao; 2 (Taiwan) Kuo Tian-shin; 7 (Taiwan) Lin Xiao-cheng; 11 (Taiwan) Chu Yu-hsien; 24 (Taiwan) Wang Shun-ho; 28 (Taiwan) Cheng Kai-wen; 34 (Taiwan) Chang Yu-ming; 69 (Taiwan) Tung Ping-hsuan; 81 (Taiwan) Chang You-jia; 82 (Taiwan) Jan Cheng-lin; 121 (Taiwan) Zeng Shen-an; 126 (Taiwan) Hsu Po-hung	Manager: 27 (Taiwan) Yeh Chun-chang; Coaches: 14 (Puerto Rico) Cirilo Cruz Dilan (hitting); 54 (Taiwan) Lin Wei-en (bench); 66 (Taiwan) Chang Chien-ming (bench); 70 (Japan) Yōsuke Takasu (hitting); 80 (Taiwan) Wang Hao (assistant strength); 86 (Taiwan) Chen Chih-wei (infield); 91 (Taiwan) Kuo Sheng-an (bullpen); 92 (Taiwan) Huang Yi-chih (pitching); 93 (Taiwan) Chiu Chang-jung (fielding); 94 (Taiwan) Liu Chia-hao (catching); 95 (Taiwan) Kao Hsiao-yi (base running); 97 (Taiwan) Chiu Shih-chieh (strength); Second team manager: 12 (Taiwan) Chang Chia-hao; Second team coaches: 19 (Taiwan) Lo Chia-jen (bullpen); 30 (Puerto Rico) Orlando Román (pitching); 32 (Taiwan) Wang Ying-peng (battery); 53 (Taiwan) Wu Jia-you (assistant hitting); 62 (Taiwan) Wu Chung-chun (hitting); 76 (Taiwan) Liu Jung-hua (fielding); 79 (Taiwan) Lin Tsung-nan (bench); 83 (Taiwan) Peng Li-yao (strength and conditioning); 87 (Taiwan) Liu Chia-kai (assistant strength); 89 (Taiwan) Hsiao I-chieh (pitching); Roster updated on 27 March 2025

=== Retired numbers ===
- 85 (Taiwan) Hsu Sheng-ming

=== List of managers ===
No.	Name	Years	Playoffs	Championships
1	Sung Huan-hsun	1990	1	1
2	Hsu Sheng-ming	1991–1993	1	0
3	Kenjiro Tamiya	1994–1995	0	0
–	Hsu Sheng-ming	1996–1999	4	3
4	Yeh Chun-chang	2021–present	3	2

== See also ==
- The Black Eagles Incident

== Notes ==
^1 First half-season champions
^2 Second half-season champions
