= Mercuries Tigers =

Information
- League: Chinese Professional Baseball League
- Location: Taipei
- Ballpark: Taipei Municipal Baseball Stadium
- Founded: 1990; 36 years ago
- Folded: 1999; 27 years ago
- League championships: 1990 1st Half
- Colors: Blue

Current uniforms
| Home | Away |

The Mercuries Tigers (Chinese: 三商虎; pinyin: Sānshāng Hǔ) were a professional baseball team belonging to Taiwan's Chinese Professional Baseball League (CPBL) between 1990 and 1999.

== History ==
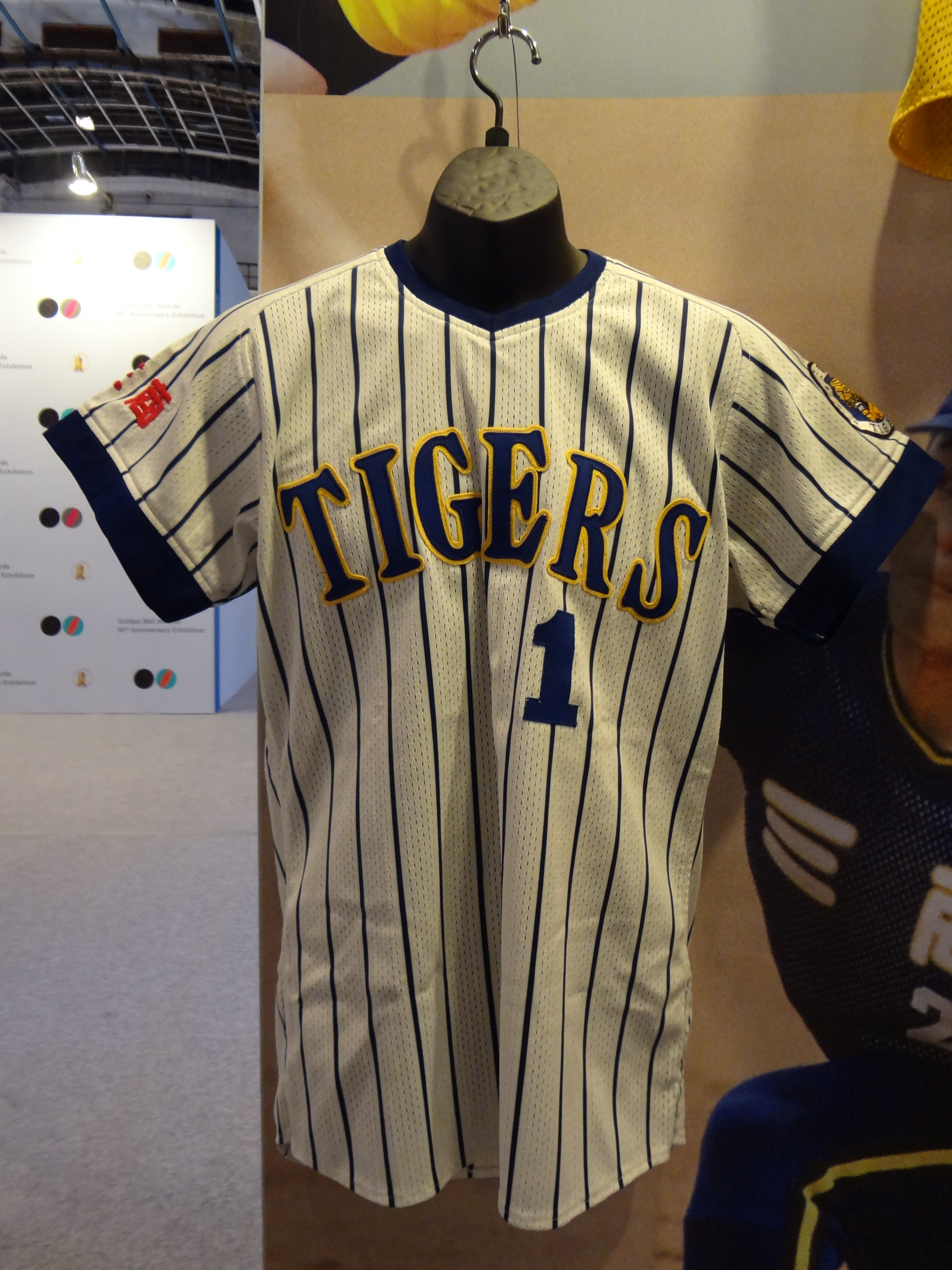
Mercuries Tigers uniform

The Tigers were owned and administered by the local Mercuries Corporation whose then chairman Chen He-dong (陳河東) was a classmate and a close friend of Brother Hotel and Brother Elephants's chairman Hung Teng-sheng (洪騰勝) in the National Taiwan University, and immediately promised to fulfill Hung's wishes to form a Taiwanese professional baseball league in 1988. This team was established accordingly in 1989 and took the now-demolished Taipei Municipal Baseball Stadium as its home throughout its history. Because the Mercuries Corporation itself was inexperienced in running sports clubs, in 1988 and 1989 it was mostly Hung Teng-sheng that built up the Tiger's roster as well as managing most business, with Chen He-dong sponsoring the necessary fund. This team therefore became the only one of the CPBL's founding teams without an amateur history: both Brother Elephants and Wei Chuan Dragons were original amateur teams, while the bulk of Uni-President Lions's players came from Taipower (台電).

With a strong initial roster, the Tigers won the first CPBL half-season championship in 1990, but ironically it was also the only one half-season championship it ever won throughout its history.

In the 1990 Taiwan Series, the Tigers were defeated by the Wei Chuan Dragons 2-4, and except for winning the 2nd place in the upper 1994 and lower 1995 half season, this club had never gained an upper-half seat in the final seasonal standings throughout its history, as well as long time being the least popular and poorest attended CPBL team throughout its lifetime. After long time loss the Mercuries Corporation finally closed down the team after the 1999 season ended. Most Tiger's players and coaches were later absorbed by the Brother Elephants and Chinatrust Whales. In November 1999 right after the close down, the TVBS and Taiwan Major League's then chairman Chiu Fu-sheng (邱復生) ever invited Chen He-dong to sponsor the Taichung Agan, but Chen He-dong did not respond.

The most famous players in the team's history includes Lin Chung-chiu (林仲秋) and Luis Iglesias, the former have won the leader of HR in single seasons most times in the CPBL history.

== Regular season records ==
| Season | First Half-Season | | | | | Second Half-Season | | | | |
| Season | Wins | Losses | Ties | Pct. | Place | Wins | Losses | Ties | Pct. | Place |
|---|---|---|---|---|---|---|---|---|---|---|
| 1990 | 29 | 13 | 3 | .690 | 1 | 18 | 25 | 2 | .419 | 3 |
| 1991 | 16 | 24 | 5 | .400 | 4 | 19 | 22 | 4 | .463 | 3 |
| 1992 | 16 | 26 | 3 | .381 | 4 | 20 | 21 | 4 | .488 | 3 |
| 1993 | 16 | 29 | 0 | .356 | 6 | 17 | 25 | 3 | .405 | 6 |
| 1994 | 23 | 20 | 2 | .535 | 2 | 17 | 27 | 1 | .386 | 5 |
| 1995 | 22 | 28 | 0 | .440 | 5 | 27 | 20 | 3 | .574 | 2 |
| 1996 | 16 | 33 | 1 | .327 | 5 | 23 | 24 | 3 | .489 | 5 |
| 1997 | 22 | 22 | 4 | .500 | 4 | 24 | 22 | 2 | .522 | 4 |
| 1998 | 50 | 52 | 3 | .490 | 5 | | | | | |
| 1999 | 39 | 52 | 2 | .429 | 4 | | | | | |

== Playoff records ==
=== Taiwan Series ===
| Season | Preliminary Round | | | Championship Round | | |
| Season | Opponent | Wins | Losses | Opponent | Wins | Losses |
|---|---|---|---|---|---|---|
| 1990 | – | – | – | Wei Chuan Dragons | 2 | 4 |

== Notable former players ==
- (Taiwan) Lin Chung-chiu（林仲秋）
- (Panama) Luis Iglesias
- (Venezuela) Urbano Lugo
- (Panama) Lenin Picota
- (Venezuela) Melvin Mora
- (United States) Chuck Carr

== See also ==
- China Times Eagles
- Wei Chuan Dragons
