= Yeh Chun-chang =

Taiwanese baseball player

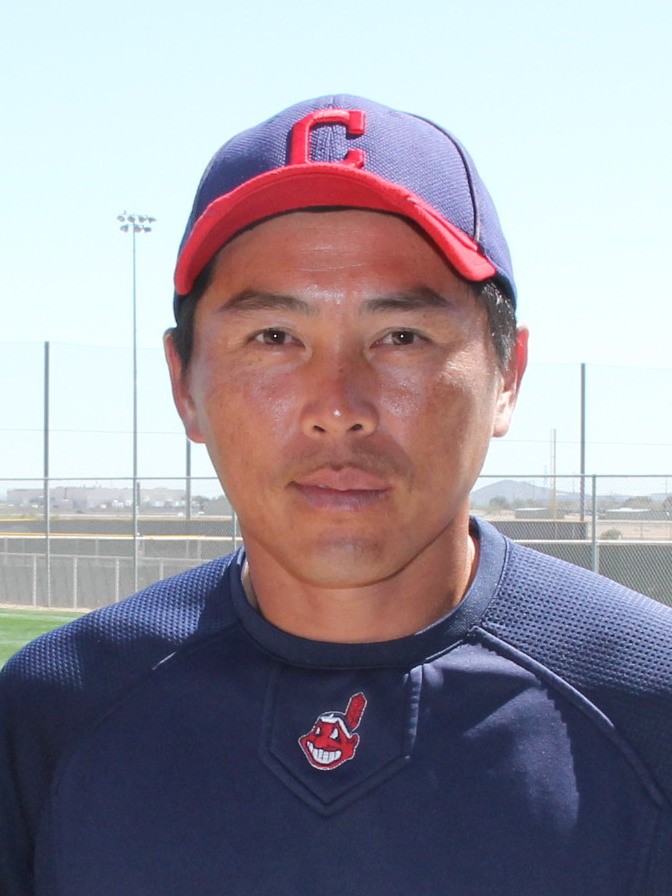

Wei Chuan Dragons – No. 27
- Catcher / Manager
- Born: 25 October 1972 (age 53); Taipei, Taiwan
- Batted: Right Threw: Right

CPBL debut
- 8 April, 1996, for the Wei Chuan Dragons

Last CPBL appearance
- 30 September, 2011, for the Brother Elephants

CPBL statistics
- Batting average: .230
- Home runs: 6
- RBIs: 355
- Stats at Baseball Reference

Teams
- As player: Wei Chuan Dragons (1996–1999); Sinon Bulls (2000–2009); Brother Elephants (2010–2011); As manager: EDA Rhinos/Fubon Guardians (2015–2018); Wei Chuan Dragons (2019–present)

Yeh Chun-chang (born 25 October 1972) is a Taiwanese baseball player who competed at the 2004 Summer Olympics and at the 2008 Summer Olympics.

== Early life and education ==
Yeh was born in Shilin District, Taipei, and attended Taipei Municipal Shilin Elementary School.
