= Jaír Camargo =

Colombian baseball player (born 1999)

Jair Camargo
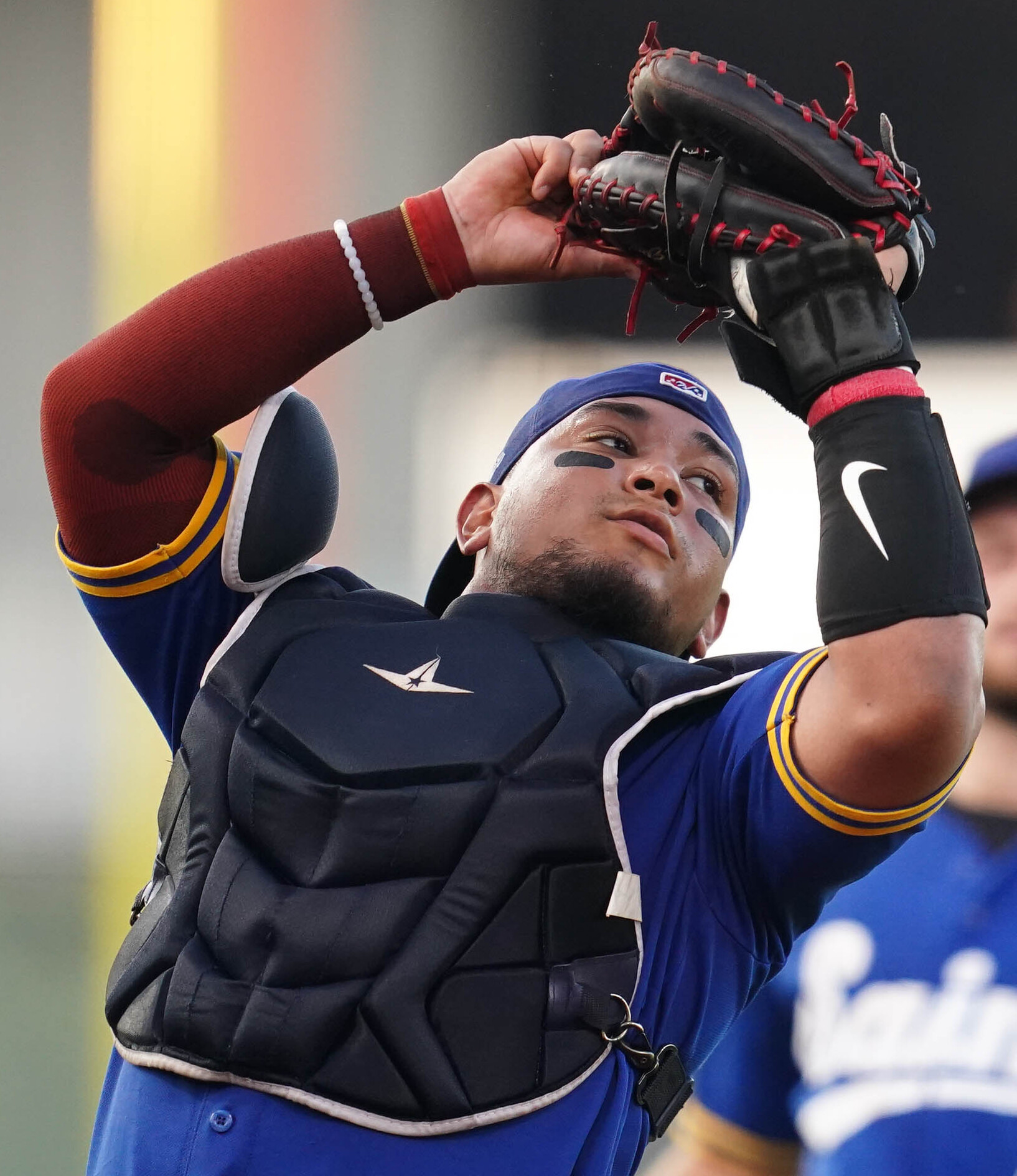
- Camargo with the St. Paul Saints in 2023

Free agent
- Catcher
- Born: July 1, 1999 (age 27); Barranquilla, Colombia
- Bats: Right Throws: Right

MLB debut
- April 16, 2024, for the Minnesota Twins

MLB statistics (through 2026 season)
- Batting average: .125
- Home runs: 0
- Runs batted in: 0
- Stats at Baseball Reference

Teams
- Minnesota Twins (2024); Atlanta Braves (2026)
Medals
Men's baseball
Representing Colombia
Junior Pan American Games
| Gold medal – first place | 2021 Cali-Valle | Team |

Jair David Camargo (born July 1, 1999) is a Colombian professional baseball catcher who is a free agent. He has previously played in Major League Baseball (MLB) for the Minnesota Twins and Atlanta Braves. He made his MLB debut in 2024.

== Career ==
=== Los Angeles Dodgers ===
On July 10, 2015, Camargo signed with the Los Angeles Dodgers of Major League Baseball (MLB) as an international free agent. He made his professional debut in 2016 with the Dominican Summer League Dodgers, hitting .250 in 41 games. Camargo spent the next two seasons at the rookie–level. He hit .273/.307/.402 with two home runs and 16 RBI for the rookie-level Arizona League Dodgers in 2017; in 2018 with the AZL Dodgers and rookie-level Ogden Raptors, he slashed .257/.277/.443 with four home runs and 25 RBI across 33 contests.

Camargo spent the 2019 season with the Single–A Great Lakes Loons. In 79 games for the Loons, he hit .236/.301/.342 with four home runs and 41 RBI.

=== Minnesota Twins ===
On February 10, 2020, the Dodgers traded Camargo, Kenta Maeda, and cash considerations to the Minnesota Twins in exchange for Brusdar Graterol, Luke Raley, and the 67th overall selection in the 2020 MLB draft. He did not play in a game in 2020 due to the cancellation of the minor league season because of the COVID-19 pandemic. Camargo returned to action in 2021 with the High–A Cedar Rapids Kernels, slashing .236/.279/.418 with 13 home runs and 36 RBI across 71 appearances.

Camargo split the 2022 season between the rookie–level Florida Complex League Twins, Cedar Rapids, and the Double–A Wichita Wind Surge. In 77 games for the three affiliates, Camargo accumulated a .262/.310/.483 batting line with 18 home runs and 50 RBI. He elected free agency following the season on November 10, 2022.

On November 19, 2022, Camargo re-signed with the Twins organization on a minor league contract. Camargo spent the 2023 campaign with the Triple–A St. Paul Saints, playing in 90 games and hitting .259/.323/.503 with career–highs in home runs (21) and RBI (63). On November 6, 2023, the Twins added Camargo to their 40-man roster to prevent him from reaching minor league free agency.

Camargo began the 2024 season with St. Paul and was promoted to the major leagues for the first time on April 13, 2024. In five games for Minnesota during his rookie campaign, Camargo went 0-for-6 with one walk.

Camargo was optioned to Triple-A St. Paul to begin the 2025 season. In 31 appearances for the Saints, he batted .212/.258/.319 with two home runs, 13 RBI, and one stolen base. On June 25, 2025, Camargo underwent Tommy John surgery, ending his season. On July 21, Camargo was designated for assignment by the Twins. He was released by Minnesota on July 24.

=== Atlanta Braves ===
On July 25, 2025, Camargo signed a minor league contract with the Atlanta Braves organization.

Camargo began the 2026 campaign with the Triple-A Gwinnett Stripers, slashing .232/.262/.319 with two home runs and 13 RBI in 37 games. On June 17, 2026, the Braves promoted him to the major leagues. Camargo made one appearance for the Braves, collecting one hit in two at-bats. On July 6, he was designated for assignment by Atlanta. Camargo cleared waivers and was sent outright to Gwinnett on July 9. He elected free agency on November 2.

== International career ==
Camargo was named to the Colombia national baseball team for the 2026 World Baseball Classic qualifiers.
