= Baseball at the 2021 Junior Pan American Games =

- Venue: Estadio Édgar Rentería
- Location: (Colombia) Cali
- Dates: 26 November – 2 December
- Nations: 7
- Teams: 7 (men)

The baseball competition of the 2021 Junior Pan American Games in Cali, Colombia was held from 26 November to 2 December at the Estadio Édgar Rentería, the events were played by U23 national teams.

== Participating teams ==
Men

- Argentina
- Brazil
- Colombia
- Cuba
- Dominican Republic
- Nicaragua
- Venezuela

== Medal summary ==
=== Medal table ===
Rank	Nation	Gold	Silver	Bronze	Total
1	Colombia	1	0	0	1
2	Dominican Republic	0	1	0	1
3	Cuba	0	0	1	1
Totals (3 entries)		1	1	1	3

== Medalists ==
Event	Gold	Silver	Bronze
Boys' tournament	Colombia; Brayan Buelvas; Carlos Arroyo; Carlos De Avila; Dayan Frias; Guillermo Quintana; Jaír Camargo; Jasier Herrera; Jean Herrera; Jesús Marriaga; Jordan Díaz; Jorge Martinez; Jose Altamiranda; Juan Zabala; Leandro Emiliani; Luis Castro; Luis De Avila; Luis Moreno; Rafael Romero; Roger Caraballo; Ruben Galindo; Sergio Palacio; Victor Vargas	Dominican Republic; Abraham Hiraldo; Albert Suarez; Andres Mesa; Cristian Gonzales; Dianyer Florentino; Francis Florentino; Franklin Brioso; Freuddy Batista; George Feliz; Gregoris Chalas; Ismael Alcantara; Jesus Gomez; Joan Valdez; Jose Geraldo; Linse Carvajal; Lizandro Rodriguez; Luis Paulino; Luis Mieses; Randy Florentino; Sandro Fabian; Yeison Coca; Yoyner Fajardo	Cuba; Adrian Rivera; Alejandro Escobar; Alex Pérez; Alyansel Alvarez; Andrys Perez; Ariel Pestano; Carlos Rodriguez; Christian Rodriguez; Frank Álvarez; Guillermo Garcia; Jorge Rojas; José Santos; Juan Lopez; Kelbis Rodriguez; Luis Serpa; Mailon Cruz; Marlon Vega; Naykel Cruz; Pedro Revilla; Roberto Alvarez; Roidel Martinez; Tony Guerra

=== Final standing ===
Rank	Team
1st place, gold medalist(s)	Colombia
2nd place, silver medalist(s)	Dominican Republic
3rd place, bronze medalist(s)	Cuba
4	Venezuela
5	Brazil
6	Nicaragua
7	Argentina

== Statistical leaders ==
=== Batting ===
Statistic	Name	Total/Avg
Batting average*	(Dominican Republic) Sandro Fabian	.750
Hits	(Dominican Republic) Sandro Fabian	9
Runs	(Colombia) Carlos Arroyo	6
Doubles	(Dominican Republic) Sandro Fabian	5
Triples	7 tied with	1
Home runs	8 tied with	1
Runs batted in	(Colombia) Luis Castro	8
Walks	(Venezuela) Justin López	6
Stolen bases	(Colombia) Brayan Buelvas	2
On-base percentage*	(Dominican Republic) Sandro Fabian	.769
Slugging percentage*	(Dominican Republic) Sandro Fabian	1.167
OPS*	(Dominican Republic) Sandro Fabian	1.936

* Minimum 2.7 plate appearances per team game

=== Pitching ===
Statistic	Name	Total/Avg
Wins	(Cuba) Naykel Cruz	2
Wins	(Dominican Republic) Joan Valdez	2
Wins	(Venezuela) Carlos Valero	2
Saves	(Cuba) Frank Álvarez	2
Saves	(Brazil) Igor Januario	2
Saves	(Venezuela) Carlos Naveda	2
Innings pitched	(Cuba) Naykel Cruz	11.2
Earned run average*	13 tied with	0.00
Strikeouts	(Cuba) Naykel Cruz	18
Walks allowed*	4 tied with	0
BAA*	(Argentina) Ignacio Vazquez	.000

* Minimum 0.8 innings pitched per team game
