= Taipei Municipal Baseball Stadium =

Baseball park in Songshan, Taipei, Taiwan

Coordinates: 25°03′02.50″N 121°33′0″E

- 台北市立棒球場
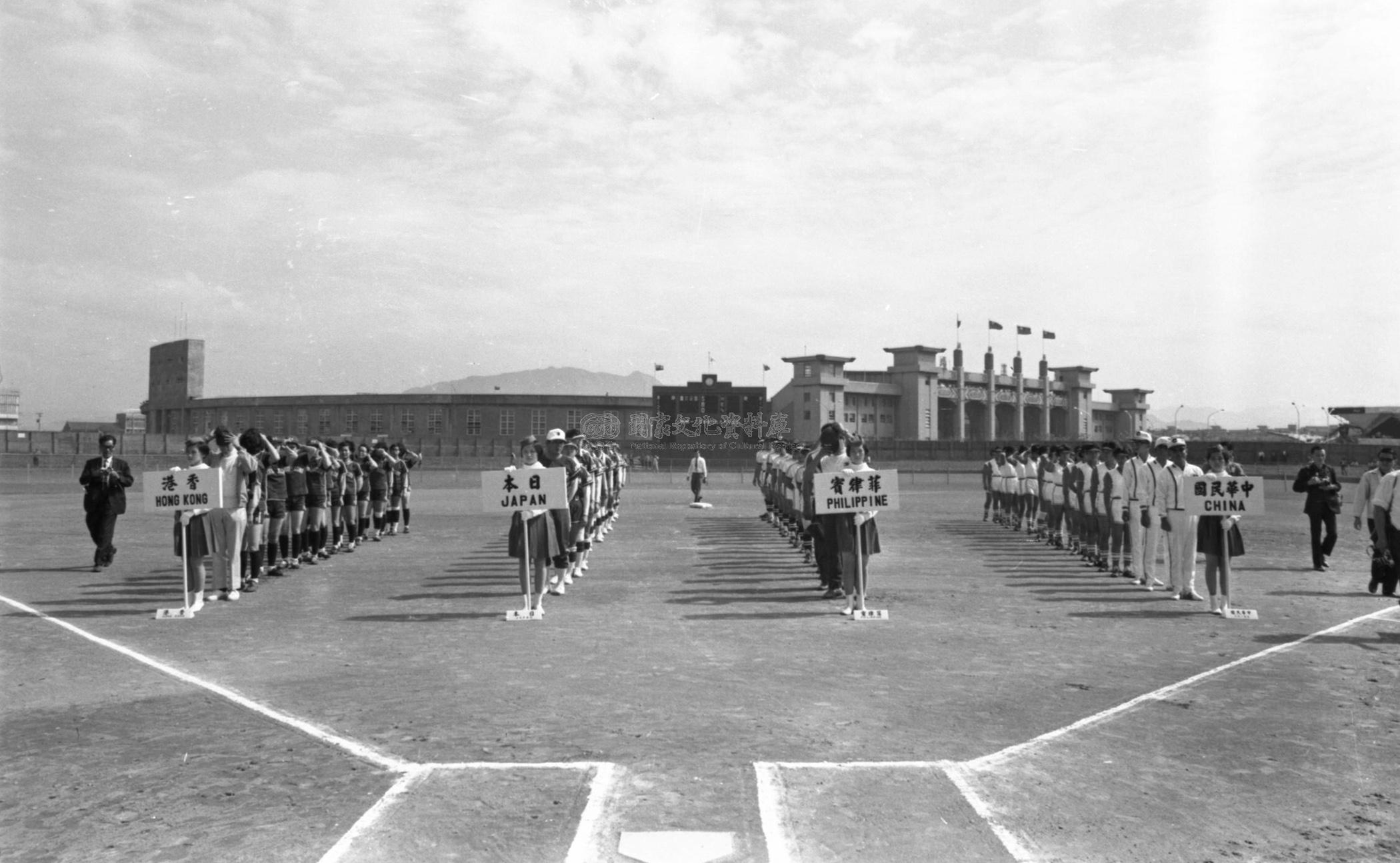
- Interactive map of Taipei Municipal Baseball Stadium
- Location: Taipei, Taiwan
- Owner: Taipei City Government
- Capacity: 5,000 (1961) 14,000 (1982)
- Surface: Dirt/Grass
- Field size: Left Field Line – 310 ft Center Field – 360 ft Right Field Line – 310 ft

Construction
- Groundbreaking: 1 July 1957
- Opened: 1959
- Closed: 26 November 2000
- Demolished: 1 December 2000

Tenants
- Brother Elephants (1990–2000); Wei Chuan Dragons (1990–1999); Mercuries Tigers (1990–1999)

The Taipei Municipal Baseball Stadium (Chinese: 台北市立棒球場; pinyin: Táiběi Shìlì Bàngqiúchǎng) was a baseball park located in the Songshan District of Taipei, Taiwan. It was opened in 1959, and hosted numerous major baseball games over the years, including the CPBL's first game in 1990 between Uni-President Lions and Brother Elephants. During its professional years, the stadium was frequently taken as the home stadium of Brother Elephants, Wei Chuan Dragons, and Mercuries Tigers. It was closed and demolished in 2000. Its site is currently occupied by the Taipei Arena. Its role in professional baseball was filled by Tianmu Baseball Stadium across town and Xinzhuang Baseball Stadium in nearby Taipei County (now New Taipei City).

== See also ==
- Chinese Professional Baseball League
