= Ruben Galindo =

Colombian baseball player (born 2001)

Free agent
- Pitcher
- Born: January 24, 2001 (age 25); San Juan de Urabá, Colombia
- Bats: Right Throws: Right
Medals
Men's baseball
Representing Colombia
Pan American Games
Gold medal – first place	2023 Santiago	Team
Junior Pan American Games
Gold medal – first place	2021 Cali-Valle	Team

Ruben Antonio Galindo Naar (born January 24, 2001) is a Colombian professional baseball pitcher who is a free agent.

== Professional career ==
Galindo signed with the San Diego Padres on July 2, 2019. He did not play in a game in 2020 due to the cancellation of the minor league season because of the COVID-19 pandemic. Galindo made his professional debut in 2021 with the Single-A Lake Elsinore Storm. He returned to Lake Elsinore the following season, posting a 5-3 record and 5.67 ERA with 77 strikeouts across 31 appearances (including five starts).

Galindo split the 2023 season between the Single-A Lake Elsinore Storm and High-A Fort Wayne TinCaps, accumulating a 2-3 record and 3.19 ERA with 63 strikeouts and six saves across 37 total appearances. Returning to Fort Wayne in 2024, he recorded a 3.09 ERA with 25 strikeouts in 23 1/3 innings pitched across 13 games (including one start).

Galindo split the 2025 campaign between Fort Wayne and the rookie-level Arizona Complex League Padres. In 25 appearances (two starts) for the two affiliates, he posted a cumulative 1-3 record and 7.36 ERA with 35 strikeouts and one save. On March 17, 2026, Galindo was released by the Padres organization.

== International career ==
Galindo represented the Colombia national baseball team in the 2023 World Baseball Classic, pitching in Colombia's games against Great Britain and the United States. Galindo was part of the Colombia squad that won the gold medal at the 2023 Pan American Games in October 2023.
