= Lin Chung-chiu =

Taiwanese baseball player

- Born: 23 September 1958 (age 66); Fengyuan City, Taichung County, Taiwan
- Bats: Right Throws: Right

CPBL debut
- August 3, 1990, for the Mercuries Tigers

Career statistics (through 2003)
- Batting average: .287
- Home runs: 162
- Runs batted in: 566

Teams
- Mercuries Tigers (1990–1999); Sinon Bulls (2000–2001); Chinatrust Whales (2002)

Career highlights and awards
- CPBL Best Nine (1991,1992)

Lin Chung-chiu (Chinese: 林仲秋; pinyin: Lín Zhòngqiū; born 23 September 1958 in Fengyuan City, Taichung County (now part of Taichung City), Taiwan) is a retired Taiwanese professional baseball player(position: first baseman, outfielder or designated hitter) and currently a baseball coach. During the 1980s Lin spent most of his amateur career in Japan and attended the 1988 Olympics for the Chinese Taipei national baseball team. After Professional baseball in Taiwan's debut in 1990, Lin left Japan to join CPBL's Mercuries Tigers in July 1990 and stayed with the team until its collapse in November 1999. He later played for the Sinon Bulls(2000~2001) and Chinatrust Whales(2002), and retired as a player midway in the Whale's 2002 season. Right after his retirement Lin was immediately promoted as the Whale's head coach until the end of CPBL's 2003 season. Between 2004 and 2006 Lin ran a small restaurant in his Fengyuan hometown. In early 2007, Lin returned to CPBL as Sinon Bulls' hitting coach and holds the position to date.

Despite his relative short figure, Lin is well known for his excellent batting skills and led the CPBL in home runs in the 1991, 1992, 2000 and 2001 seasons, at the age of 43. Throughout his Professional Baseball in Taiwan career he hit 162 home runs, which was only surpassed by Chang Tai-Shan and Hsieh Chia-hsien as of 2008.

== Basic Information ==
- Number: 6 (1990~2002 as player), 67 (2002 as coach ~ present)
- Height: 167 cm
- Weight: 83 kg
- Bats/Throws: Right/Right

== Career statistics ==
Bold letter indicates leading in the CPBL league

Season	Team	G	AB	H	HR	RBI	SB	BB	K	TB	GIDP	AVG
1990	Mercuries Tigers	29	103	28	6	13	0	7	13	51	2	0.272
1991	Mercuries Tigers	78	281	76	16	43	2	29	34	141	7	0.270
1992	Mercuries Tigers	88	339	98	24	56	5	34	36	183	10	0.289
1993	Mercuries Tigers	85	296	82	9	35	8	50	32	126	10	0.277
1994	Mercuries Tigers	83	300	92	14	52	3	25	31	158	6	0.307
1995	Mercuries Tigers	100	390	99	14	65	3	23	30	165	7	0.254
1996	Mercuries Tigers	84	320	104	9	45	6	22	30	151	9	0.325
1997	Mercuries Tigers	93	350	108	14	57	3	37	49	174	7	0.309
1998	Mercuries Tigers	103	378	111	15	60	6	59	54	180	14	0.294
1999	Mercuries Tigers	76	258	70	8	41	3	32	39	109	7	0.271
2000	Sinon Bulls	86	302	85	15	45	2	40	45	149	11	0.281
2001	Sinon Bulls	89	329	94	18	54	2	39	53	160	4	0.286
2002	Chinatrust Whales	6	2	0	0	0	0	4	2	0	0	0.000
Total	13 seasons	1000	3648	1047	162	566	43	401	448	1747	83	0.287
