= Luis De Ávila =

Colombian baseball player (born 2001)

Charleston Dirty Birds – No. 0
- Pitcher
- Born: May 29, 2001 (age 24); San Estanislao, Bolívar, Colombia
- Bats: Left Throws: Left
Medals
Men's baseball
Representing Colombia
Bolivarian Games
Gold medal – first place	2025 Lima-Ayacucho	Team
Junior Pan American Games
Gold medal – first place	2021 Cali-Valle	Team

Luis Felipe De Ávila Pajaro (born May 29, 2001) is a Colombian professional baseball pitcher for the Charleston Dirty Birds of the Atlantic League of Professional Baseball. He represented the Colombian national team at the 2023 World Baseball Classic.

== Career ==
=== Colorado Rockies ===
De Ávila signed with the Colorado Rockies as an international free agent on July 2, 2017. He made his professional debut in 2018 with the Dominican Summer League Rockies, posting a 6.16 ERA over 8 games. On March 1, 2019, De Ávila was suspended 72 games after testing positive for Boldenone, a performance-enhancing substance. He was released by the Rockies organization on September 20.

=== Kansas City Royals ===
On November 20, 2019, De Ávila signed a minor league contract with the Kansas City Royals organization. He did not play in a game in 2020 due to the cancellation of the minor league season because of the COVID-19 pandemic.

De Ávila was utilized as a relief pitcher during the 2021 season, splitting the campaign between the rookie-level Arizona Complex League Royals and Single-A Columbia Fireflies. In 27 appearances out of the bullpen for the two affiliates, he compiled a 5-4 record and 4.99 ERA with 64 strikeouts across 57 2/3 innings pitched.

=== Atlanta Braves ===
On December 8, 2021, De Ávila was selected by the Atlanta Braves in the minor league phase of the Rule 5 draft. He spent the 2022 campaign with the Single-A Rome Braves, working to a 6-8 record and 3.49 ERA with 129 strikeouts in 126 1/3 innings pitched over 24 starts.

De Ávila split the 2023 season between the Double-A Mississippi Braves and Triple-A Gwinnett Stripers. In 26 starts for the two affiliates, he compiled an aggregate 6-10 record and 3.26 ERA with 128 strikeouts over 127 innings of work.

De Ávila returned to Mississippi for the 2024 season. In 19 starts, he posted a 4-10 record and 3.74 ERA with 79 strikeouts across 101 innings pitched. De Ávila was released by the Braves organization on March 23, 2025.

=== Pericos de Puebla ===
On April 16, 2025, De Ávila signed with the Pericos de Puebla of the Mexican League. In eight starts for Puebla, he struggled to an 0-3 record and 6.30 ERA with 21 strikeouts over 30 innings pitched. On June 10, De Ávila was released by the Pericos.

=== Charleston Dirty Birds ===
On July 1, 2025, De Ávila signed with the Charleston Dirty Birds of the Atlantic League of Professional Baseball. In 13 starts 71 innings he went 4-4 with a 5.45 ERA and 60 strikeouts.

== International career ==
De Ávila pitched for the Colombia national baseball team at the 2023 World Baseball Classic. He replaced José Quintana on the roster. In his sole appearance, a start against the United States, he pitched 1.2 scoreless innings, allowing a triple to Mike Trout and walk to Paul Goldschmidt.

He also was on the Colombian squad at the 2025 Bolivarian Games, pitching 3.0 innings against Ecuador, allowing one run and striking out seven. Colombia ultimately won the gold medal at the tournament.
