= Jasier Herrera =

Colombian baseball player (born 1998)

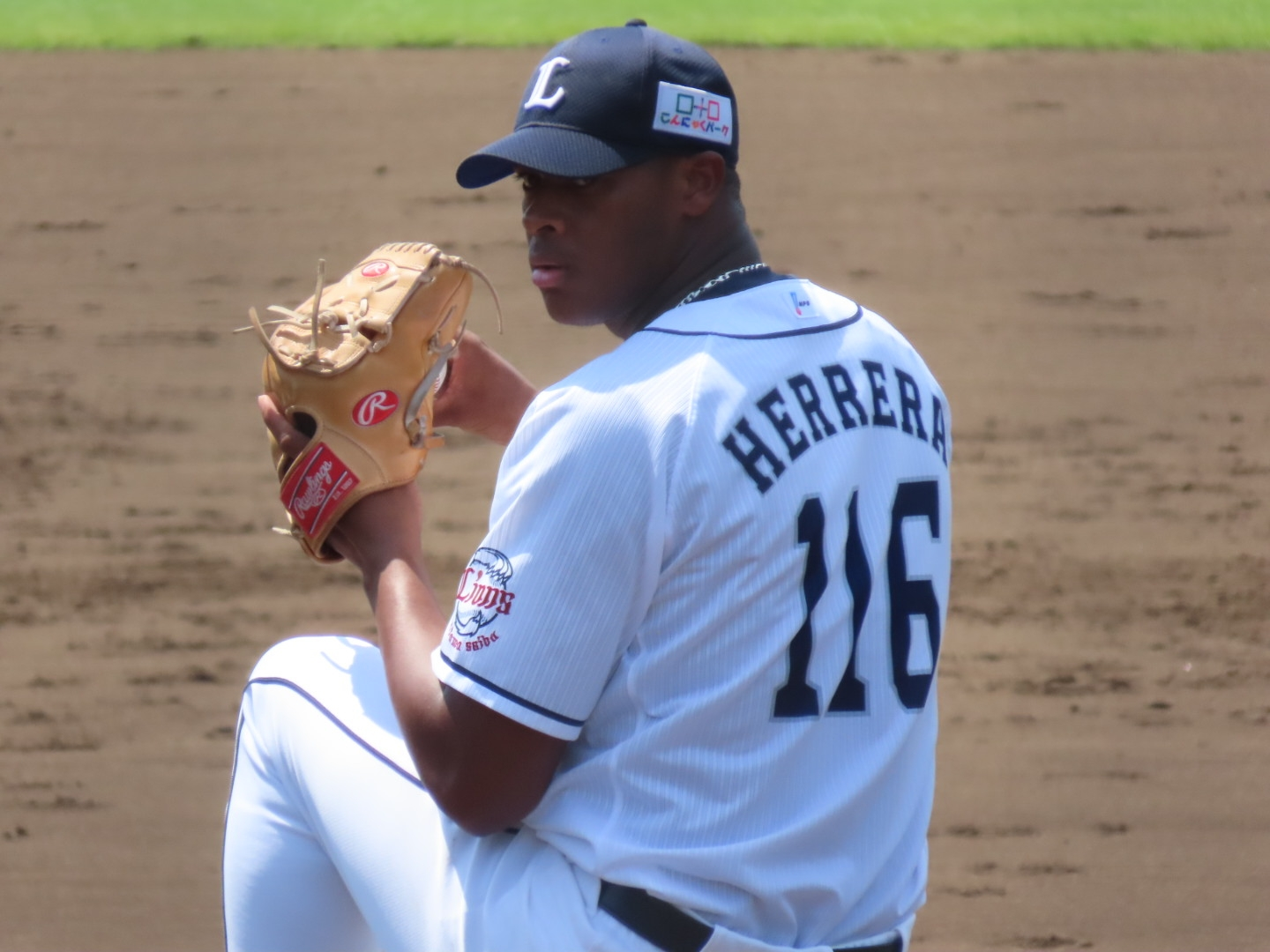

Milwaukee Milkmen
- Pitcher
- Born: January 1, 1998 (age 28); Cartagena, Colombia
- Bats: Right Throws: Right
- Stats at Baseball Reference
Medals
Men's baseball
Representing Colombia
Junior Pan American Games
Gold medal – first place	2021 Cali-Valle	Team

Jasier Herrera (born January 1, 1998) is a Colombian professional baseball pitcher for the Milwaukee Milkmen of the American Association of Professional Baseball.

== Career ==
=== San Francisco Giants ===
On November 22, 2014, Herrera signed with the San Francisco Giants as an international free agent. He spent the next two seasons with the Dominican Summer League Giants, posting a 9.26 ERA in 10 games in 2015, and registering a 3.27 ERA with 21 strikeouts and 5 saves across 17 appearances in 2016.

Herrera missed the entire 2017 season after undergoing Tommy John surgery. He returned to action in 2018 with the rookie-level Arizona League Giants. In 12 appearances (11 starts) for the team, Herrera compiled a 1-4 record and 3.88 ERA with 49 strikeouts across 55 2/3 innings pitched.

Herrera split the 2019 campaign between the AZL Giants and the Low-A Salem-Keizer Volcanoes. In 15 appearances (12 starts) for the two affiliates, he accumulated a 9/2 record and 2.66 ERA with 65 strikeouts over 81 1/3 innings of work. Herrera did not play in a game in 2020 due to the cancellation of the minor league season because of the COVID-19 pandemic.

Herrera spent 2021 with the High-A Eugene Emeralds, also receiving a one-game cup of coffee with the Triple-A Sacramento River Cats. In 24 appearances for Eugene, he posted a 1-2 record and 3.99 ERA with 57 strikeouts across 56 1/3 innings pitched. Herrera elected free agency following the season on November 7, 2021.

=== Saitama Seibu Lions ===
On March 15, 2022, Herrera signed with the Staten Island FerryHawks of the Atlantic League of Professional Baseball. However, on May 13, Herrera signed with the Saitama Seibu Lions of Nippon Professional Baseball as a development player. In 10 appearances for Seibu's farm team, he posted a 4-2 record and 2.90 ERA with 43 strikeouts over 62 innings of work. Herrera pitched in 9 contests for the Lions' farm team in 2023, compiling a 2-4 record and 3.29 ERA with 30 strikeouts across 52 innings pitched.

=== Wei Chuan Dragons ===
On December 18, 2023, Herrera signed with the Wei Chuan Dragons of the Chinese Professional Baseball League. He spent the entire 2024 season with the Dragons' farm team, posting a 3.33 ERA and 1.23 WHIP across 78 1/3 innings pitched. Herrera was released by Wei Chuan on August 9, 2024.

On January 12, 2025, Herrera re-signed with the Dragons. However, he did not make an appearance for Wei Chuan during the 2025 season.

=== Milwaukee Milkmen ===
On February 2, 2026, Herrera signed with the Milwaukee Milkmen of the American Association of Professional Baseball.
