= John Clark (baseball) =

Taiwanese baseball player (born 2000)

Wei Chuan Dragons – No. 44
- Infielder
- Born: 18 October 2000 (age 25); Taipei, Taiwan
- Bats: Right Throws: Right

CPBL debut
- November 20, 2021, for the Wei Chuan Dragons

CPBL statistics (through 2025 season)
- Batting average: .160
- Home runs: 0
- Runs batted in: 5
- Stats at Baseball Reference

Teams
- Wei Chuan Dragons (2021, 2023–present)

John Peter Clark III (Chinese: 陳思仲; Wade–Giles: Chʻên^{2} Ssŭ^{1}-chung^{4}; born 18 October 2000) is a Taiwanese professional baseball infielder for the Wei Chuan Dragons of the Chinese Professional Baseball League (CPBL). He was drafted by the Dragons in 2021 and made his professional debut in November of that year.

== Early life and education ==
Clark was born in Taipei, Taiwan, to an American father and Taiwanese mother. He attended Fu-Lin Elementary School and joined the school's baseball team in fourth grade. He then played third base and shortstop at Chang-An Junior High School.

Clark played at Kupao Home Economics Commercial High School in New Taipei City. He was named best third baseman at the Black Panther Banner national high school tournament in his senior year. He played summer tournaments in the United States through high school but did not receive an NCAA offer. He enrolled at Edmonds Community College in 2019.

In 2020, Clark returned to Taiwan following the COVID-19 pandemic. He attended classes virtually and joined the Taipei Highwealth team in the Popcorn League.

== Professional career ==
Clark entered the CPBL draft in 2021. He was selected by the Wei Chuan Dragons in the 6th round.
