= Chuck Carr (baseball) =

American baseball player (1967–2022)

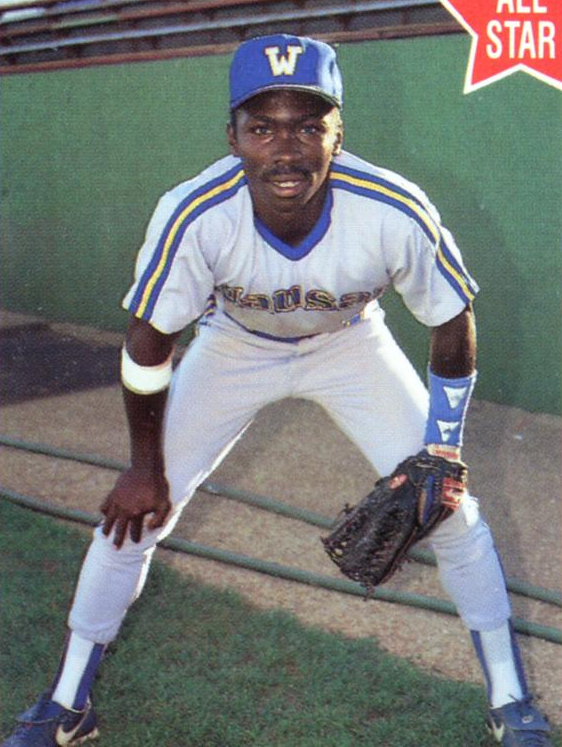
- Carr with the Wausau Timbers c. 1988
- Center fielder
- Born: August 10, 1967; San Bernardino, California, U.S.
- Died: November 12, 2022 (aged 55); Oklahoma City, Oklahoma, U.S.
- Batted: Switch Threw: Right

MLB debut
- April 28, 1990, for the New York Mets

Last MLB appearance
- September 27, 1997, for the Houston Astros

MLB statistics
- Batting average: .254
- Home runs: 13
- Runs batted in: 123
- Stolen bases: 144

CPBL statistics
- Batting average: .308
- Home runs: 3
- Runs batted in: 12
- Stolen bases: 15
- Stats at Baseball Reference

Teams
- New York Mets (1990–1991); St. Louis Cardinals (1992); Florida Marlins (1993–1995); Milwaukee Brewers (1996–1997); Houston Astros (1997); Mercuries Tigers (1998)

Career highlights and awards
- NL stolen base leader (1993)

Charles Lee Glenn Carr Jr. (August 10, 1967 – November 12, 2022) was an American professional baseball player. He was a Major League Baseball outfielder.

== Career ==
Carr did not receive much playing time until after the 1993 expansion draft. Then he played as one of the original members of the Miami Marlins. He topped the National League in stolen bases that year with 58.

In an eight-season career, he played in 507 games, had 1,713 at-bats, 254 runs, 435 hits, 81 doubles, seven triples, 13 home runs, 123 RBI, 144 stolen bases, 149 walks, a .254 batting average, .316 on-base percentage, .332 slugging percentage, 569 total bases, 30 sacrifice hits, 10 sacrifice flies, and four Intentional walks.

Carr is perhaps remembered most for his departure from the Milwaukee Brewers in 1997. After popping out to third base on a two balls, no strike count and after being signaled to take the next pitch, Carr was questioned by manager Phil Garner. Carr reportedly replied to Garner by saying in the third person: "That ain't Chuckie's game. Chuckie hacks on 2-0." Carr was released from the club shortly thereafter. He played the rest of that season with the Houston Astros, who won the 1997 National League Central division. He hit a postseason home run off John Smoltz in Game 3 of the 1997 National League Division Series. The home run came in the final at bat of his major-league career.

== Overview ==
Carr died on November 12, 2022, at the age of 55. Fox News said that he was "a Major League Baseball outfielder who was a part of the inaugural Florida Marlins team and led the National League in stolen bases in 1993." They went on to say that he had played baseball in Taiwan (with the Mercuries Tigers of Taipei) in 1998.

== See also ==
- List of Major League Baseball annual stolen base leaders
