= Aaron Leasher =

American baseball player (born 1996)

Algodoneros de Unión Laguna – No. 14
- Pitcher
- Born: April 28, 1996 (age 30); Mount Pleasant, Michigan, U.S.
- Bats: Left Throws: Left

CPBL debut
- July 28, 2024, for the Fubon Guardians

CPBL statistics (through 2025 season)
- Win–loss record: 4–5
- Earned run average: 2.57
- Strikeouts: 73
- Stats at Baseball Reference

Teams
- Fubon Guardians (2024); Wei Chuan Dragons (2025)

Aaron Leasher (born August 24, 1998) is an American professional baseball pitcher for the Algodoneros de Unión Laguna of the Mexican League. He has previously played in the Chinese Professional Baseball League (CPBL) for the Fubon Guardians and Wei Chuan Dragons.

== Career ==
=== San Diego Padres ===
Leasher was drafted by the San Diego Padres in the 6th round, with the 168th overall selection, of the 2017 Major League Baseball draft. He split his first professional season between the rookie-level Arizona League Padres and Low-A Tri-City Dust Devils, posting a 4.29 ERA over 11 starts. Leasher spent 2018 with the Single-A Fort Wayne TinCaps and High-A Lake Elsinore Storm. In 24 appearances (18 starts) split between the two affiliates, he compiled an aggregate 6-7 record and 3.49 ERA with 117 strikeouts across 118 2/3 innings pitched.

Leasher split the 2019 campaign between Lake Elsinore and the Double-A Amarillo Sod Poodles, registering a combined 10-8 record and 3.60 ERA with 114 strikeouts in 122 1/3 innings pitched over 23 games (19 starts). He did not play in a game in 2020 due to the cancellation of the minor league season because of the COVID-19 pandemic. Leasher returned to action in 2021 with the Double-A San Antonio Missions and Triple-A El Paso Chihuahuas. In 16 games (15 starts) for the two affiliates, he logged a 4-5 record and 3.76 ERA with 62 strikeouts across 64 2/3 innings pitched.

Leasher returned to El Paso for the 2022 season, making 35 appearances (11 starts) for the team, in which he posted an 8-6 record and 4.23 ERA with 91 strikeouts across 87 1/3 innings pitched. He split the 2023 campaign between San Antonio and El Paso, accumulating a 3-3 record and 5.37 ERA with 51 strikeouts across 29 games (9 starts). Leasher elected free agency following the season on November 6, 2023.

=== Staten Island FerryHawks ===
On March 25, 2024, Leasher signed with the Staten Island FerryHawks of the Atlantic League of Professional Baseball. In 12 starts for Staten Island, Leasher compiled a 7-2 record and 2.21 ERA with 66 strikeouts across 73 1/3 innings pitched.

=== Fubon Guardians ===
On July 16, 2024, Leasher signed with the Fubon Guardians of the Chinese Professional Baseball League. In 9 starts for Fubon, Leasher compiled a 4-3 record and 2.21 ERA with 45 strikeouts across 53 innings of work.

=== Wei Chuan Dragons ===
On March 14, 2025, Leasher signed with the Wei Chuan Dragons of the Chinese Professional Baseball League. He made 24 appearances for the Dragons, accumulating an 0-2 record and 3.25 ERA with 28 strikeouts across 27 2/3 innings pitched. Leasher was released by Wei Chuan on August 29.

On February 12, 2026, Leasher signed with the Leones de Yucatán of the Mexican League. However, he did not make the Opening Day roster and was released prior to the season.

=== Hagerstown Flying Boxcars ===
On May 23, 2026, Leasher signed with the Hagerstown Flying Boxcars of the Atlantic League of Professional Baseball. In five starts for Hagerstown, he posted a 3–1 record with a 5.87 ERA, 32 strikeouts, and nine walks across 23 innings of work.

=== Algodoneros de Unión Laguna ===
On June 30, 2026, Leasher's contract was transferred to the Algodoneros de Unión Laguna of the Mexican League.
