= Zach D'Orazio =

American football player (born 1991)

No. 11
- Position: Wide receiver

Personal information
- Born: May 28, 1991 (age 35); Avon Lake, Ohio, U.S.
- Listed height: 6 ft 2 in (1.88 m)
- Listed weight: 217 lb (98 kg)

Career information
- High school: Cuyahoga Heights (OH)
- College: Akron
- NFL draft: 2015: undrafted

Career history
- New England Patriots (2015)*
- * Offseason or practice squad member only

Zach D'Orazio (born May 28, 1991) is an American former football wide receiver. He played college football at Akron and high school football at Cuyahoga Heights High School.

== Early life ==
D'Orazio attended Elyria Catholic High School before transferring to Cuyahoga Heights High School in Cleveland, Ohio, where he played football and ran track. He was named Chagrin Valley Metro Division Conference Offensive MVP in his junior and senior years. During his senior year (2008) he played quarterback and defensive back. As a QB, he completed 67 passes for 1,175 yards with 14 touchdowns and five interceptions. He rushed for 1,346 on 124 attempts. At DB, he had 74 tackles and 5 interceptions. He was named first-team All-Ohio in Division V at quarterback and first-team All-Ohio as a defensive back in his senior year. In track, he was conference champion in the 100-, 200- and 400-meter sprints.

== College career ==
D'Orazio signed with the Akron Zips in 2010, but did not commence studying at Akron until January 2011 and began playing football in 2012. On March 27, 2012, it was announced that D'Orazio would switch from the quarterback position to wide receiver. He broke his leg in a game against the Tennessee Volunteers on September 22, and was out for the rest of the season. In his sophomore season (2013), he avoided injury and played the whole year, finishing with 54 receptions for 764 yards and 4 touchdowns. In his junior year, D'Orazio had 62 receptions for 658 yards and one touchdown. After his junior season, D'Orazio entered the 2015 NFL draft.

Statistics

		Receiving					Rushing		
Year	Team	Rec	Yds	Avg	Lng	TD	Att	Yds	TD
2012	Akron	15	197	13.1	31	0	0	0	0
2013	Akron	42	567	13.5	77	4	1	−2	0
2014	Akron	62	658	10.6	32	1	1	3	0
Career		119	1,422	12.4	140	5	2	1	0

== Professional career ==
D'Orazio was rated the 87th best wide receiver in the 2015 NFL draft by NFLDraftscout.com.

Pre-draft measurables
Height	Weight	40-yard dash	10-yard split	20-yard split	20-yard shuttle	Three-cone drill	Vertical jump	Broad jump	Bench press
6 ft 1 in (1.85 m)	213 lb (97 kg)	4.52 s	1.56 s	2.63 s	4.32 s	7.14 s	32 in (0.81 m)	9 ft 5 in (2.87 m)	17 reps
All values from Akron Pro Day

On May 26, 2015, D'Orazio signed with the New England Patriots as an undrafted rookie. He was released on June 11, but re-signed with the team on July 23. D'Orazio was cut by the Patriots on September 5 as part of final cuts.
