= Naykel Cruz =

Cuban baseball player (born 1999)

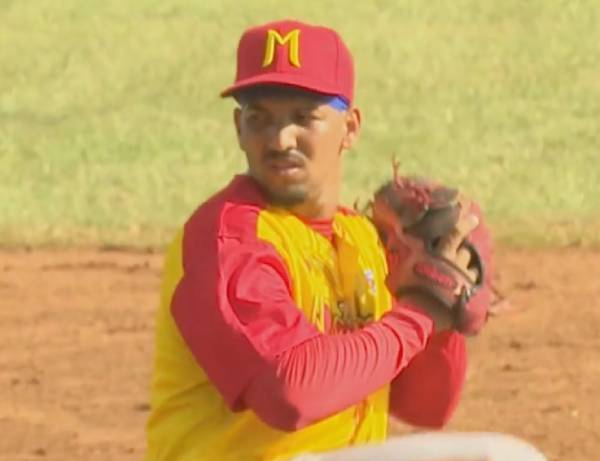
- Cruz with the Cocodrilos de Matanzas in 2022

Free agent
- Pitcher
- Born: April 29, 1999 (age 27); Matanzas, Cuba
- Bats: Left Throws: Left
Medals
Men's baseball
Representing Cuba
Junior Pan American Games
Bronze medal – third place	2021 Cali-Valle	Team

Naykel Yoel Cruz (born April 29, 1999) is a Cuban professional baseball pitcher who is a free agent. Cruz was named to the Cuba national baseball team for the 2023 World Baseball Classic and 2026 World Baseball Classic.

== Career ==
=== Piratas de Campeche ===
Cruz began his career with the Cocodrilos de Matanzas of the Cuban National Series. In four years, from 2019–20 to 2023–24, Cruz pitched to a 4.18 ERA. In 2022, Cruz also appeared in seven games for the Piratas de Campeche of the Mexican League. Cruz struggled in seven games in the Mexican League, pitching to a 9.82 ERA.

=== Baltimore Orioles ===
On June 3, 2025, Cruz signed a minor league contract with the Baltimore Orioles. He was assigned to the Dominican Summer League. In 11 games in the league in the 2025 season, Cruz had a 4.58 ERA. On February 25, 2026, Cruz was released by the Orioles organization.
