= Frank Álvarez =

Cuban baseball player (born 1999)

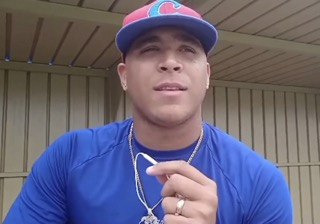
- Álvarez at the 2023 Pan American Games

Free agent
- Pitcher
- Born: January 16, 1999 (age 27); Pinar del Río, Cuba
- Bats: Right Throws: Right
- Stats at Baseball Reference
Medals
Men's baseball
Representing Cuba
Junior Pan American Games
Bronze medal – third place	2021 Cali-Valle	Team

Frank Abel Álvarez (born January 16, 1999) is a Cuban professional baseball pitcher who is a free agent.

Álvarez previously played for the Chunichi Dragons organization from Japan's Nippon Professional Baseball and for the Guerreros de Oaxaca of the Mexican League. Álvarez was named to the Cuba national baseball team for the 2023 World Baseball Classic and the 2026 World Baseball Classic.

== Career ==
=== Vegueros de Pinar del Río ===
In Cuba, Álvarez made his debut with Vegueros de Pinar del Río of the Cuban National Series in the 2018–19 season. In 11 games in his first season, Álvarez was 1–1 with a 2.76 ERA. Álvarez did not match that success in his following two seasons, pitching to a 8.05 ERA and 4.47 ERA, respectively.

=== Chunichi Dragons ===
For the 2022 season, Álvarez signed a development contract with the Chunichi Dragons of Nippon Professional Baseball. In 7 games in 2022, Álvarez had had a 3.38 ERA for the Dragon development team. Álvarez would struggle in subsequent seasons, a 5.56 ERA in 2023 and 6.64 ERA in 2024. Álvarez was not offered a contract after the 2024 season and was never promoted to the main team.

On February 5, 2025, Álvarez signed with the Guerreros de Oaxaca of the Mexican League. However, he suffered an elbow injury and never made an appearance for the team.

=== Vegueros de Pinar del Río (second stint) ===
Álvarez returned to Pinar del Río for the 2025–26 season.

=== Guerreros de Oaxaca ===
On April 26, 2026, Álvarez signed with the Guerreros de Oaxaca of the Mexican League. In seven relief appearances for the Guerreros, he posted a 1–0 record with a 7.20 ERA, two strikeouts, and five walks over five innings pitched. On June 8, Álvarez was released by Oaxaca.
