= Keijiro Matsumoto =

Japanese baseball player (born 1986)

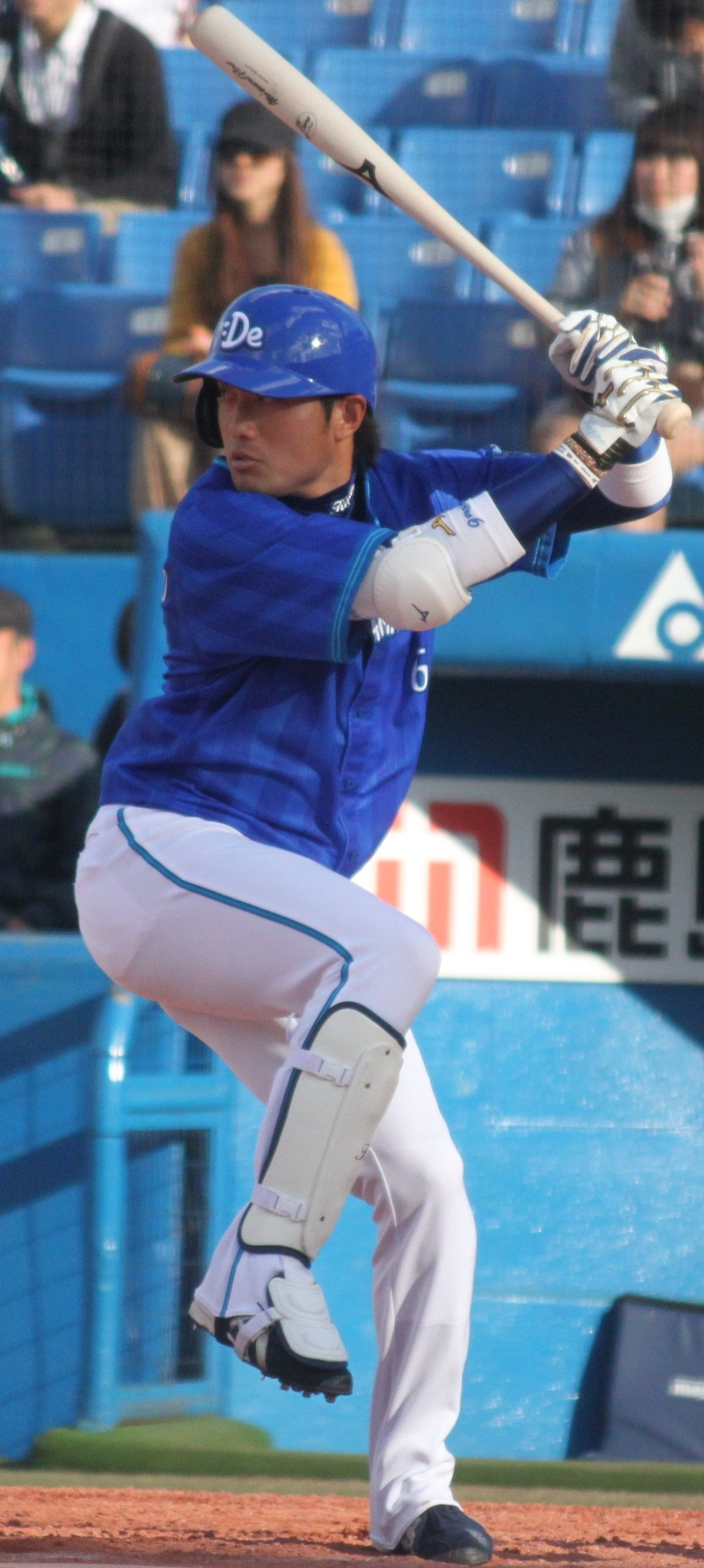
- Matsumoto with the Yokohama DeNA BayStars
- Outfielder
- Born: June 24, 1986 (age 39); Ōamishirasato, Chiba, Japan
- Bats: Left Throws: Left

debut
- April 3, 2009, for the Yokohama BayStars
- Stats at Baseball Reference

Teams
- Yokohama BayStars/Yokohama DeNA BayStars (2009–2017)

Keijiro Matsumoto (松本 啓二朗, Matsumoto Keijiro; born June 24, 1986) is a professional Japanese baseball player. He plays outfielder for the Yokohama DeNA BayStars.
