= Cuyahoga Heights, Ohio =

- Village
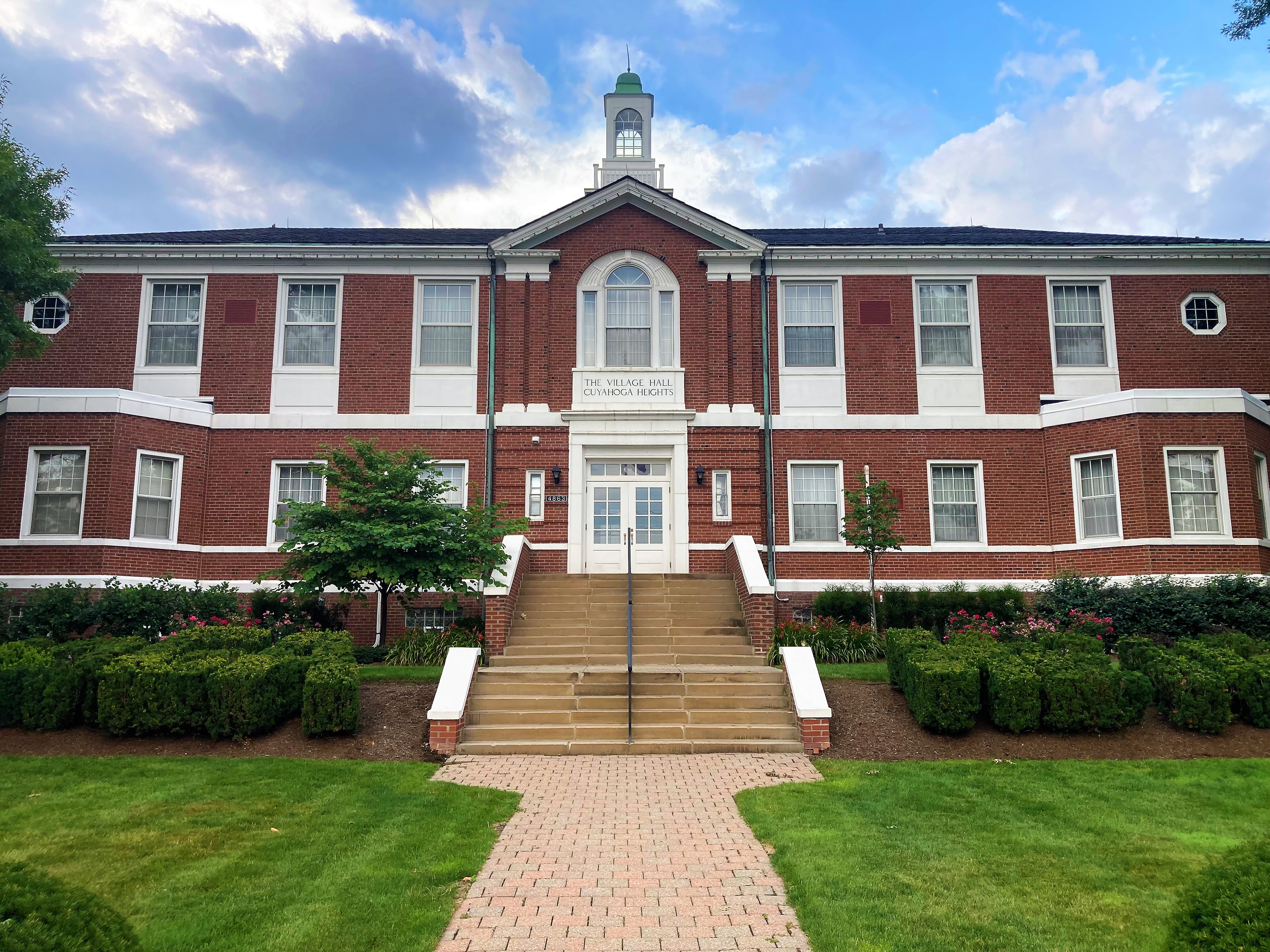
- Village Hall
- Interactive map of Cuyahoga Heights, Ohio
- Location within Ohio Location within the United States
- Coordinates: 41°26′10″N 81°39′11″W
- Country: United States
- State: Ohio
- County: Cuyahoga

Government
  - Mayor: Jack Bacci (R)

Area
  - Total: 3.21 sq mi (8.31 km^{2})
  - Land: 3.07 sq mi (7.95 km^{2})
  - Water: 0.14 sq mi (0.36 km^{2})
- Elevation: 715 ft (218 m)

Population (2020)
  - Total: 573
  - Estimate (2023): 554
  - Density: 186.6/sq mi (72.06/km^{2})
- Time zone: UTC-5 (Eastern (EST))
  - Summer (DST): UTC-4 (EDT)
- ZIP codes: 44105, 44125, 44127
- Area code: 216
- FIPS code: 39-19806
- GNIS feature ID: 1080492
- Website: https://www.cuyahogaheights.gov/

Cuyahoga Heights is a village in Cuyahoga County, Ohio, United States. The population was 573 at the 2020 census. A suburb of Cleveland, it is a part of the Cleveland metropolitan area.

== Geography ==
Cuyahoga Heights is located at 41°26′10″N 81°39′11″W (41.436202, -81.653145).

According to the United States Census Bureau, the village has a total area of 3.21 square miles (8.31 km^{2}), of which 3.07 square miles (7.95 km^{2}) is land and 0.14 square miles (0.36 km^{2}) is water.

== Demographics ==
Historical population
Census	Pop.	Note	%±
1920	739		—
1930	710		−3.9%
1940	674		−5.1%
1950	713		5.8%
1960	796		11.6%
1970	866		8.8%
1980	739		−14.7%
1990	682		−7.7%
2000	599		−12.2%
2010	638		6.5%
2020	573		−10.2%
2023 (est.)	554	▼	−3.3%
U.S. Decennial Census

=== 2020 census ===
Cuyahoga Heights village, Ohio – Racial and ethnic composition Note: the US Census treats Hispanic/Latino as an ethnic category. This table excludes Latinos from the racial categories and assigns them to a separate category. Hispanics/Latinos may be of any race.
Race / Ethnicity (NH = Non-Hispanic)	Pop 2000	Pop 2010	Pop 2020	% 2000	% 2010	% 2020
White alone (NH)	588	615	486	98.16%	96.39%	84.82%
Black or African American alone (NH)	0	4	8	0.00%	0.63%	1.40%
Native American or Alaska Native alone (NH)	0	1	0	0.00%	0.16%	0.00%
Asian alone (NH)	7	9	15	1.17%	1.41%	2.62%
Native Hawaiian or Pacific Islander alone (NH)	0	0	0	0.00%	0.00%	0.00%
Other race alone (NH)	0	1	0	0.00%	0.16%	0.00%
Mixed race or Multiracial (NH)	4	2	37	0.67%	0.31%	6.46%
Hispanic or Latino (any race)	0	6	27	0.00%	0.94%	4.71%
Total	599	638	573	100.00%	100.00%	100.00%

91.6% spoke English, 4.4% Italian, and 4.0% Polish as their first language.

=== 2010 census ===
Largest ancestries (2010)	Percent
Polish (Poland)	39.5%
Italian (Italy)	24.1%
German (Germany)	18.8%
Irish (Republic of Ireland)	10.1%
American (United States)	7.1%
Hungarian (Hungary)	4.9%

As of the census of 2010, there were 638 people, 258 households, and 169 families living in the village. The population density was 207.8 inhabitants per square mile (80.2/km^{2}). There were 278 housing units at an average density of 90.6 per square mile (35.0/km^{2}). The racial makeup of the village was 97.3% White, 0.6% African American, 0.2% Native American, 1.4% Asian, 0.2% from other races, and 0.3% from two or more races. Hispanic or Latino of any race were 0.9% of the population.

There were 258 households, of which 33.3% had children under the age of 18 living with them, 31.8% were married couples living together, 23.6% had a female householder with no husband present, 10.1% had a male householder with no wife present, and 34.5% were non-families. 32.2% of all households were made up of individuals, and 16.6% had someone living alone who was 65 years of age or older. The average household size was 2.47 and the average family size was 3.12.

The median age in the village was 40.5 years. 25.9% of residents were under the age of 18; 8.6% were between the ages of 18 and 24; 22.1% were from 25 to 44; 27.2% were from 45 to 64; and 16.1% were 65 years of age or older. The gender makeup of the village was 45.6% male and 54.4% female.

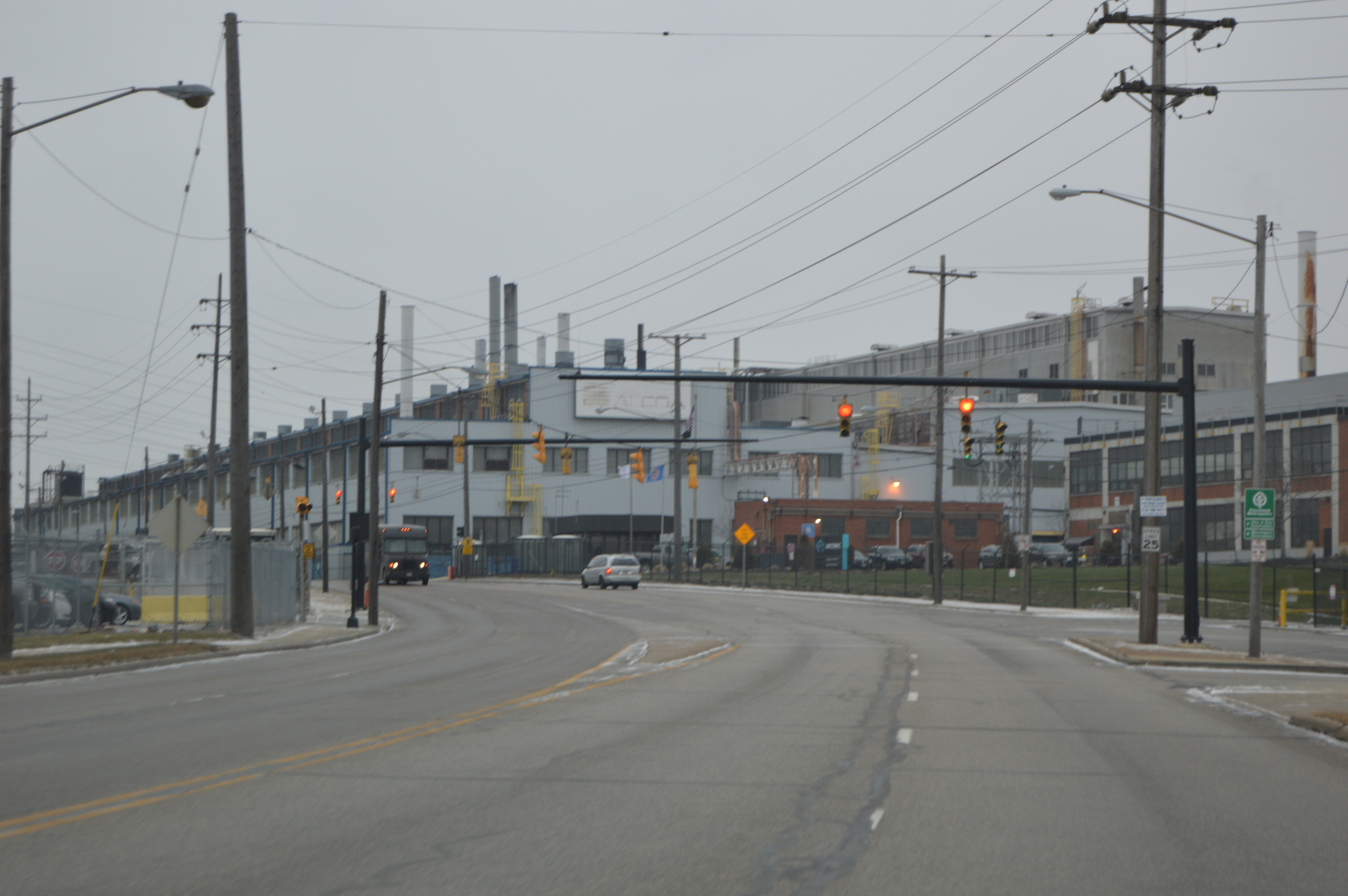
Alcoa Complex on Harvard Avenue.

=== 2000 census ===
Largest ancestries (2000)	Percent
Polish (Poland)	39.9%
Italian (Italy)	21.0%
German (Germany)	15.9%
Irish (Republic of Ireland)	12.2%
Slovak (Slovakia)	6.0%
English (England)	5.8%

As of the census of 2000, there were 599 people, 261 households, and 159 families living in the village. The population density was 186.7 inhabitants per square mile (72.1/km^{2}). There were 277 housing units at an average density of 86.3 per square mile (33.3/km^{2}).

There were 261 households, out of which 25.7% had children under the age of 18 living with them, 44.1% were married couples living together, 10.7% had a female householder with no husband present, and 38.7% were non-families. 35.6% of all households were made up of individuals, and 18.0% had someone living alone who was 65 years of age or older. The average household size was 2.30 and the average family size was 2.98.

In the village, the population was spread out, with 21.5% under the age of 18, 6.8% from 18 to 24, 24.9% from 25 to 44, 23.0% from 45 to 64, and 23.7% who were 65 years of age or older. The median age was 42 years. For every 100 females there were 92.0 males. For every 100 females age 18 and over, there were 89.5 males.

The median income for a household in the village was $40,625, and the median income for a family was $54,167. Males had a median income of $45,368 versus $28,929 for females. The per capita income for the village was $21,446. About 2.4% of families and 5.7% of the population were below the poverty line, including 4.1% of those under age 18 and 10.6% of those age 65 or over.
