= 2006 World Baseball Classic Pool 1 =

Pool 1 of the Second Round of the 2006 World Baseball Classic was held at Angel Stadium of Anaheim, Anaheim, California, United States from March 12 to 16, 2006.

Like the first round, Pool 1 was a round-robin tournament. The final two teams advanced to the semifinals.

== Standings ==
Pos	Team	Pld	W	L	RF	RA	RD	PCT	GB	Qualification
1	South Korea	3	3	0	11	5	+6	1.000	—	Advance to championship round
2	Japan	3	1	2	10	7	+3	.333 (Note: Japan 2.55 RA/9, United States 2.65 RA/9, Mexico 3.50 RA/9)	2	Advance to championship round
3	United States (H)	3	1	2	8	12	−4	.333	2	
4	Mexico	3	1	2	4	9	−5	.333	2	

(H) Hosts

== Results ==
- All times are Pacific Standard Time (UTC−08:00).

=== United States 4, Japan 3 ===
March 12 13:00 at Angel Stadium of Anaheim
Team	1	2	3	4	5	6	7	8	9	R	H	E
Japan	1	2	0	0	0	0	0	0	0	3	8	2
United States	0	1	0	0	0	2	0	0	1	4	11	0
WP: Brad Lidge (1–0) LP: Kyuji Fujikawa (0–1); Home runs: JPN: Ichiro Suzuki (1); USA: Chipper Jones (2), Derrek Lee (3); Attendance: 32,896 (73.0%); Umpires: HP − Bob Davidson, 1B − Ramon Armendariz, 2B − Brian Knight, 3B − Neil Poulton; Notes: Two outs when winning run scored. Boxscore

=== South Korea 2, Mexico 1 ===
March 12 20:00 at Angel Stadium of Anaheim
Team	1	2	3	4	5	6	7	8	9	R	H	E
Mexico	0	0	1	0	0	0	0	0	0	1	5	0
South Korea	2	0	0	0	0	0	0	0	X	2	5	0
WP: Jae-weong Seo (2–0) LP: Rodrigo López (0–2) Sv: Chan Ho Park (3); Home runs: MEX: Luis A. García (1); KOR: Seung-yuop Lee (4); Attendance: 42,979 (95.4%); Umpires: HP − Chris Guccione, 1B − Travis Reininger, 2B − Ed Hickox, 3B − Carlos Rey; Boxscore

=== South Korea 7, United States 3 ===
March 13 19:00 at Angel Stadium of Anaheim
Team	1	2	3	4	5	6	7	8	9	R	H	E
United States	0	0	1	0	0	0	0	0	2	3	9	3
South Korea	2	0	1	3	0	1	0	0	X	7	10	0
WP: Min-han Son (2–0) LP: Dontrelle Willis (0–2); Home runs: USA: Ken Griffey Jr. (3); KOR: Seung-yuop Lee (5), Hee-seop Choi (1); Attendance: 21,288 (47.3%); Umpires: HP − Ed Hickox, 1B − Chris Guccione, 2B − Travis Reininger, 3B − Carlos Rey; Boxscore

=== Japan 6, Mexico 1 ===
March 14 16:00 at Angel Stadium of Anaheim
Team	1	2	3	4	5	6	7	8	9	R	H	E
Japan	0	0	0	4	1	0	0	0	1	6	12	2
Mexico	0	0	0	0	0	0	0	1	0	1	3	2
WP: Daisuke Matsuzaka (2–0) LP: Esteban Loaiza (1–1); Home runs: JPN: Tomoya Satozaki (1); MEX: Miguel Ojeda (1); Attendance: 16,591 (36.8%); Umpires: HP − Ramon Armendariz, 1B − Bob Davidson, 2B − Brian Knight, 3B − Neil Poulton; Boxscore

=== South Korea 2, Japan 1 ===
March 15 19:00 at Angel Stadium of Anaheim
Team	1	2	3	4	5	6	7	8	9	R	H	E
South Korea	0	0	0	0	0	0	0	2	0	2	3	0
Japan	0	0	0	0	0	0	0	0	1	1	6	0
WP: Byung-hyun Kim (1–0) LP: Toshiya Sugiuchi (0–1) Sv: Seung-hwan Oh (1); Home runs: KOR: None; JPN: Tsuyoshi Nishioka (2); Attendance: 39,679 (88.1%); Umpires: HP − Travis Reininger, 1B − Chris Guccione, 2B − Ed Hickox, 3B − Carlos Rey; Boxscore

=== Mexico 2, United States 1 ===
March 16 16:30 at Angel Stadium of Anaheim
Team	1	2	3	4	5	6	7	8	9	R	H	E
United States	0	0	0	1	0	0	0	0	0	1	3	0
Mexico	0	0	1	0	1	0	0	0	X	2	6	1
WP: Édgar Gonzalez (1–0) LP: Roger Clemens (1–1) Sv: David Cortés (1); Attendance: 38,284 (85.0%); Umpires: HP − Brian Knight, 1B − Bob Davidson, 2B − Ramon Armendariz, 3B − Neil Poulton; Boxscore
