= 2006 World Baseball Classic Pool A =

Pool A of the First Round of the 2006 World Baseball Classic was held at Tokyo Dome, Tokyo, Japan from March 3 to 5, 2006.

Pool A was a round-robin tournament. Each team played the other three teams once, with the top two teams advancing to Pool 1.

== Standings ==
Pos	Team	Pld	W	L	RF	RA	RD	PCT	GB	Qualification
1	South Korea	3	3	0	15	3	+12	1.000	—	Advance to second round
2	Japan (H)	3	2	1	34	8	+26	.667	1	Advance to second round
3	Chinese Taipei	3	1	2	15	19	−4	.333	2	
4	China	3	0	3	6	40	−34	.000	3	

(H) Hosts

== Results ==
- All times are Japan Standard Time (UTC+09:00).

=== South Korea 2, Chinese Taipei 0 ===
March 3 11:30 at Tokyo Dome
Team	1	2	3	4	5	6	7	8	9	R	H	E
South Korea	0	0	0	1	1	0	0	0	0	2	8	0
Chinese Taipei	0	0	0	0	0	0	0	0	0	0	5	1
WP: Jae-weong Seo (1−0) LP: En-yu Lin (0−1) Sv: Chan Ho Park (1); Attendance: 5,193 (12.4%); Umpires: HP − Ramon Armendariz, 1B − Peter Durfee, 2B − Masaharu Kasahara, 3B − Minggao Chen; Boxscore

=== Japan 18, China 2 ===
March 3 18:30 at Tokyo Dome
Team	1	2	3	4	5	6	7	8	9	R	H	E
Japan	0	1	1	0	4	3	2	7	X	18	15	0
China	0	0	0	2	0	0	0	0	X	2	7	4
WP: Koji Uehara (1–0) LP: Quansheng Zhao (0–1) Sv: Naoyuki Shimizu (1); Home runs: JPN: Tsuyoshi Nishioka (1), Kosuke Fukudome (1), Hitoshi Tamura (1); CHN: Wei Wang (1); Attendance: 15,869 (37.8%); Umpires: HP − Brian Knight, 1B − Adrian Johnson, 2B − Un Heo, 3B − Liang-kuei Shieh; Notes: Completed early due to 10–run mercy rule after 8 innings. Boxscore

=== South Korea 10, China 1 ===
March 4 11:00 at Tokyo Dome
Team	1	2	3	4	5	6	7	8	9	R	H	E
China	0	0	0	0	0	0	0	1	0	1	2	1
South Korea	1	0	3	1	0	2	2	1	X	10	18	0
WP: Min-han Son (1–0) LP: Kun Chen (0–1); Home runs: CHN: Shou Yang (1); KOR: Seung-yuop Lee 2 (2); Attendance: 3,925 (9.3%); Umpires: HP − Peter Durfee, 1B − Ramon Armendariz, 2B − Liang-kuei Shieh, 3B − Masaharu Kasahara; Boxscore

=== Japan 14, Chinese Taipei 3 ===
March 4 18:00 at Tokyo Dome
Team	1	2	3	4	5	6	7	8	9	R	H	E
Japan	3	1	1	0	6	1	2	X	X	14	15	0
Chinese Taipei	0	1	0	0	0	2	0	X	X	3	7	0
WP: Daisuke Matsuzaka (1–0) LP: Chu-chien Hsu (0–1); Home runs: JPN: Hitoshi Tamura (2); TPE: None; Attendance: 31,047 (73.9%); Umpires: HP − Adrian Johnson, 1B − Brian Knight, 2B − Minggao Chen, 3B − Un Heo; Notes: Completed early due to 10–run mercy rule after 7 innings. Boxscore

=== Chinese Taipei 12, China 3 ===
March 5 11:00 at Tokyo Dome
Team	1	2	3	4	5	6	7	8	9	R	H	E
Chinese Taipei	0	0	1	4	0	2	0	4	1	12	15	2
China	0	0	0	0	0	2	0	0	1	3	8	3
WP: Wei-lun Pan (1–0) LP: Nan Wang (0–1); Home runs: TPE: Yung-chi Chen (1); CHN: None; Attendance: 4,577 (10.9%); Umpires: HP − Ramon Armendariz, 1B − Peter Durfee, 2B − Masaharu Kasahara, 3B − Un Heo; Boxscore

=== South Korea 3, Japan 2 ===
March 5 18:00 at Tokyo Dome
Team	1	2	3	4	5	6	7	8	9	R	H	E
South Korea	0	0	0	0	1	0	0	2	0	3	5	0
Japan	1	1	0	0	0	0	0	0	0	2	7	0
WP: Dae-sung Koo (1–0) LP: Hirotoshi Ishii (0–1) Sv: Chan Ho Park (2); Home runs: KOR: Seung-yuop Lee (3); JPN: Munenori Kawasaki (1); Attendance: 40,353 (96.1%); Umpires: HP − Brian Knight, 1B − Adrian Johnson, 2B − Minggao Chen, 3B − Liang-kuei Shieh; Boxscore
