= Chinese Taipei national baseball team =

National men's baseball team of Taiwan

Information
- Country: Taiwan (competes as Chinese Taipei)
- Federation: Chinese Taipei Baseball Association
- Confederation: Baseball Federation of Asia
- Manager: Hao Ju Tseng (2023–)
- Captain: Chen Chieh-hsien
- Team Colors: White, Blue, Red

WBSC ranking
- Current: 2 (26 March 2026)
- Highest: 2 (3 times; latest in December 2022)
- Lowest: 5 (2 times; latest in September 2018)

Uniforms
Home	Away

Olympic Games
- Appearances: 4 (first in 1984)
- Best result: (silver) 2nd (1 time, in 1992)

World Baseball Classic
- Appearances: 6 (first in 2006)
- Best result: 8th (1 time, in 2013)

WBSC Premier12
- Appearances: 3 (first in 2015)
- Best result: (gold) 1st (1 time, in 2024)

World Cup
- Appearances: 14 (first in 1972)
- Best result: (silver) 2nd (1 time, in 1984)

Intercontinental Cup
- Appearances: 10 (first in 1973)
- Best result: (bronze) 3rd (2 times, most recent in 2006)

Asian Games
- Appearances: 4 (first in 1994)
- Best result: (gold) 1st (1 time, in 2006)

Asian Championship
- Appearances: 26 (first in 1954)
- Best result: (gold) 1st (5 times, most recent in 2019)

The Chinese Taipei national baseball team (Chinese: 中華臺北棒球代表隊; pinyin: Zhōnghuá Táiběi Bàngqiú Dàibiǎoduì) is the national men's baseball team of Taiwan. It is governed by the Chinese Taipei Baseball Association. The team is ranked second in the world by the World Baseball Softball Confederation. The team is usually made up of professionals from Taiwan's Chinese Professional Baseball League, Japan's Nippon Professional Baseball, and North America's Major League Baseball and Minor League Baseball.

Originally known as United Taiwan (Chinese: 臺灣聯隊), then the Republic of China (Chinese: 中華民國棒球代表隊; pinyin: Zhōnghuá Mínguó Bàngqiú Dàibiǎo Duì), it was officially re-designated by international federations as Chinese Taipei under the Lausanne Agreement in 1981. The name continues to be a topic of contention, with proposals to participate as “Taiwan” included in the 2018 referendum. Certain media outlets have referred to the team as Team Taiwan.

The team has won five titles in the Asian Baseball Championship (most recently in 2019), a bronze medal at the 1984 Olympic Games in Los Angeles, and a silver medal at the 1992 Olympic Games in Barcelona. It won the gold medal at the 2006 Asian Games in Doha in a sweeping victory by beating South Korea, Thailand, China, Philippines, and finally all-time rival Japan. It achieved eighth place in the 2013 World Baseball Classic, fifth place in the 12-team 2019 WBSC Premier12, and first place in the 2024 WBSC Premier12.

The team competed in the 2026 World Baseball Classic in March 2026.

== Name ==
Following the handover of Taiwan to the Republic of China (ROC) in 1945, the ROC government did not devise any baseball development policies. Organized baseball was mostly handled by civilians and some state-owned companies such as Taipower. In 1949, the Taiwan Provincial Baseball Association, predecessor to the Chinese Taipei Baseball Association, was established. In a 1951 international tour to the Philippines, a national team named United Taiwan Team (Chinese: 臺灣聯隊) was sent and competed with a logo that said TW.

In 1954, when the team first participated in the Asian Baseball Championship, it competed under the name Republic of China as part of the government's new sports diplomacy efforts.

Since the expulsion of the ROC from the United Nations in 1971, its national baseball team has competed internationally under the name Chinese Taipei, due to diplomatic pressure from the People's Republic of China, which follows a One China Policy. Within Taiwan, the team is referred to as either 中華隊 (hanyu pinyin: Zhōnghuá Duì; literally, Zhonghua team) or 台灣隊 (hanyu pinyin: Táiwān Duì; literally, Taiwan team). The designation continues to be controversial among the Taiwanese, culminating in a referendum vote in 2018 proposing to participate in the Olympics as “Taiwan”. The proposal failed to get enough votes, with many fearing that the Taiwanese team would be disallowed to compete under the name.

=== Public opinion ===
According to a December 2024 survey conducted by think tank Taiwan Brain Trust, 71.5% of Taiwanese people believe the team should compete as Taiwan, and 79.6% believe the government should actively push for name changes to Taiwan. In a separate survey conducted by Taiwan Public Opinion Foundation, 46% of Taiwanese people prefer to use the term 台灣隊 (Team Taiwan), 35% prefer 中華隊 (Zhonghua Team), 9% who are indifferent between the two, with less than 1% preferring the official Chinese Taipei.

== Current roster ==
Chinese Taipei – 2026 World Baseball Classic roster
Players		Coaches
Pitchers: 0 Lin Kai-wei; 00 Hsu Jo-hsi; 11 Gu Lin Ruei-yang; 12 Lin Shi-hsiang; 19 Chang Yi; 20 Chen Kuan-yu; 37 Zhang Jun-wei; 42 Lin Wei-en; 44 Chen Po-yu; 45 Lin Yu-min; 47 Cheng Hao-jun; 48 Zhuang Chen Zhong-Ao; 58 Hu Chih-wei; 60 Tseng Jyun-Yue; 92 Sha Tzu-chen; 96 Sun Yi-lei	Catchers: 4 Giljegiljaw Kungkuan; 27 Lyle Lin; 63 Jiang Shao-hong; Infielders: 1 Cheng Tsung-che; 9 Chang Cheng-yu [2]; 15 Lin Tzu-wei; 18 Chang Yu-cheng; 22 Jonathon Long; 39 Wu Nien-ting; 90 Chiang Kun-yu; Outfielders: 17 Stuart Fairchild; 24 Chen Chieh-hsien; 77 Lin An-ko; 88 Sung Cheng-jui [1]; 98 Chen Chen-wei	Manager: 99 Tseng Hao-jiu; Coaches: 23 Peng Cheng-min (Hitting); 28 Kuo-Hui Kao (Hitting); 70 Lin Yueh-ping (Pitching); 66 Chang Chien-ming (First Base/Outfield); 13 Chen Chiang-ho (Third Base); 34 Kao Chih-kang (Bench/Catching); 40 Wang Chien-ming (Bullpen)
[1] Replaced Jonathon Long on March 1, 2026 [2] Replaced Lee Hao-yu on March 5, 2026

== Past rosters ==
Chinese Taipei's roster for the 2023 World Baseball Classic

Chinese Taipei – 2023 World Baseball Classic roster
Players		Coaches
Pitchers: 15 Yen-Ching Lu; 16 Wei-Chung Wang; 17 Chen Kuan-yu; 21 C. C. Lee; 29 Kai-Wei Teng; 32 Yu-Hsun Chen; 43 Sung Chia-hao; 58 Chih-Wei Hu; 59 Kuan-Wei Chen; 60 Jyun-Yue Tseng; 69 Huang Tzu-peng; 71 Shao-Ching Chiang; 81 Shih-Peng Chen; 93 Che-Yuan Wu	Catchers: 4 Kungkuan Giljegiljaw; 31 Dai-An Lin; 65 Yu-Chieh Kao; Infielders: 1 Tsung-Che Cheng; 5 Tzu-Wei Lin; 6 Wei-Chen Wang; 18 Yu Chang; 39 Nien-Ting Wu; 46 Kuo-Chen Fan; 83 Li Lin; 90 Kun-Yu Chiang; Outfielders: 2 Kuo Tien-hsin; 9 Wang Po-jung; 12 Chen Chen-wei; 24 Chen Chieh-hsien; 35 Cheng Chin	Manager: 70 Lin Yueh-ping; Coaches: 23 Peng Cheng-min (Hitting); 91 Tseng Hao-jiu (Hitting); 0 Hsu Ming-chieh (Pitching); 66 Chang Chien-ming (First Base/Outfield); 13 Chen Chiang-ho (Third Base); 34 Kao Chih-kang (Bench/Catching); 40 Wang Chien-ming (Bullpen)

Chinese Taipei's roster for the 2024 WBSC Premier12

Chinese Taipei – 2024 WBSC Premier12 roster
Players		Coaches
Pitchers: 19 Chang Yi; 59 Chen Kuan-wei; 17 Chen Kuan-yu; 20 Chen Po-ching; 12 Chiang Kuo-hao; 71 Chuang Hsin-yen; 39 Huang En-sih; 69 Huang Tzu-peng; 75 Kuo Chun-lin; 18 Lin Kai-wei; 45 Lin Yu-min; 64 Wang Chih-hsuan; 21 Wu Chun-wei	Catchers: 27 Lyle Lin; 95 Tai Pei-fong; Infielders: 9 Chang Cheng-yu; 90 Chiang Kun-yu; 85 Chu Yu-hsien; 4 Giljegiljaw Kungkuan; 25 Li Kai-wei; 83 Li Lin; 35 Pan Chieh-kai; 58 Yueh Tung-hua; Outfielders: 98 Chen Chen-wei; 24 Chen Chieh-hsien; 14 Chiu Chih-cheng; 77 Lin An-ko; 32 Tseng Sung-en	Manager: 99 Tseng Hao-jiu; Coaches: 34 Kao Chih-kang; 31 Chen Chiang-ho; 70 Lin Yueh-ping; 28 Kao Kuo Hui; 23 Peng Cheng-min; 40 Wang Chien-ming (Pitching); 66 Chang Chien-ming

== Tournament record ==
=== World Baseball Classic ===
World Baseball Classic record							Qualification record			
Year	Round	Position	W	L	RS	RA	W	L	RS	RA
(Japan) 2006	Group stage	12th	1	2	15	19	No qualifiers held			
(Japan) 2009	Group stage	15th	0	2	1	13	No qualifiers held			
(Japan) (Taiwan) 2013	Quarterfinals	8th	2	3	17	25	3	0	35	0
(South Korea) 2017	Group stage	14th	0	3	20	32	Automatically qualified			
(Taiwan) 2023	Group stage	17th	2	2	26	31	Automatically qualified			
(Japan) 2026	Group stage	13th	2	2	19	20	2	2	20	22
Total	Round 2	6/6	7	14	98	140	5	2	55	22

==== 2006–2017 ====
Chinese Taipei participated in the 2006 World Baseball Classic. The squad included players from Major League Baseball. During the Classic, the team played in Pool A but placed third and did not advance. The team's only victory was a 12–3 win over China.

Taiwan returned in the 2009 World Baseball Classic. The squad included players from Major League Baseball. During the Classic, the team played in Pool A against the same teams as in 2006. After losses to South Korea and China, Chinese Taipei was eliminated from the tournament, finishing in 14th place.

Chinese Taipei was required to participate in the 2013 qualifiers as it was eliminated early in the game with zero wins, along with Canada, Spain and Panama. Chinese Taipei was grouped in Qualifier 4 with other teams invited, Thailand, Philippines and New Zealand. Chinese Taipei defeated New Zealand in the first round with a 10–0 win. It then crushed Philippines 16–0. In the Qualifier Round, it met New Zealand again, this time beating the team 9–0 to gain entry into the WBC 2013, where the team was grouped with South Korea, the Netherlands and Australia. The team did not lose any points in the qualification.

Taiwan faced Israel, the Netherlands, and South Korea in the 2017 World Baseball Classic. The Chinese Taipei team lost all three games it played and was eliminated in the first round.

==== 2023–2026 ====
Chinese Taipei participated in the 2023 World Baseball Classic. The squad faced Cuba, the Netherlands, Italy, and Panama. The Taiwanese team defeated the Netherlands and Italy, and lost to Panama and Cuba. Since all teams in Pool A finished with a 2–2 record, based on tiebreaker rule, Chinese Taipei placed 5th in the pool and was eliminated in the first round.

Finishing last in the World Baseball Classic 2023 Pool A, the team had to participate in the 2026 World Baseball Classic qualification. It played as the host at Taipei Dome in Taipei, Taiwan, on February 21–25, 2025. The club played against Spain, Nicaragua, and South Africa. The team defeated South Africa and lost to Spain in the first two rounds.

=== Olympic Games ===
Summer Olympics record							Qualification record
Year	Round	Position	W	L	RS	RA	Method
(Spain) 1992	Silver medal	2nd	6	3	67	34	1991 Asian Baseball Championship
(United States) 1996	Did not qualify						1995 Asian Baseball Championship
(Australia) 2000	Did not qualify						1999 Asian Baseball Championship
(Greece) 2004	Preliminary	5th	3	4	23	28	2003 Asian Baseball Championship
(China) 2008	Preliminary	5th	2	5	29	33	Final Qualifying Tournament
(Japan) 2020	Did not qualify (withdraw from final qualifying tournament due to COVID-19)						2019 Asian Baseball Championship
Total	Silver medal	3/6	11	12	119	95	

==== Barcelona Olympics, 1992 ====
On 26 July 1992 and the following ten days, Chinese Taipei competed against seven other national teams from Cuba, the Dominican Republic, Italy, Japan, Puerto Rico, Spain and the United States at the 1992 Summer Olympics in Barcelona. The teams played each other seven rounds and the top four on the table advanced to the finals. Chinese Taipei eventually advanced to the finals, beating Japan 5–2 in the semi-finals. It struggled in the final against Cuba, suffering an enormous defeat. The score was 1–11. Nonetheless, it won a silver medal, which is the best result it has achieved so far in the Olympics.

Game Summary

26 July 1992 - Round 1, Chinese Taipei defeated Italy 8–2.

27 July 1992 - Round 2, Chinese Taipei lost by one run to the United States. The final score 9–10.

28 July 1992 - Round 3, Chinese Taipei sought its second victory over the Puerto Ricans. The score was 10–1.

29 July 1992 - Round 4, Chinese Taipei dominated the Spanish. The final score was 20–0.

31 July 1992 - Round 5, Chinese Taipei beat the Dominican Republic eleven to nothing.

1 August 1992 - Round 6, Chinese Taipei faced one of its two main rivals from Asia - Japan. It acquired its fifth victory by beating Japan 2–0

2 August 1992 - Round 7, in the final round, Chinese Taipei suffered another defeat to the Cubans. This time Chinese Taipei scored only one run. The score was 1–8.

4 August 1992 - Semi-final, Chinese Taipei defeated Japan 5–2 and would play against Cuba in the final.

5 August 1992 - Final, Chinese Taipei was defeated by Cuba. Final score 1–11.

==== Athens Olympics, 2004 ====
Chinese Taipei qualified for the 2004 Olympics by finishing 2nd in the Asian Baseball Championship. The team ended up finishing 5th in the tournament.

==== Beijing Olympics, 2008 ====
The team qualified for the 2008 Olympics by finishing 3rd place in the Final Qualifying Tournament.

On August 15, Chinese Taipei lost to China for the first time in an international baseball event. However, it had been suspected by DPP legislators that Beijing set up the schedule unfair to Chinese Taipei. Chinese Taipei was scheduled to play the latest game the day before. It was estimated that the players could only get three hours of sleep. This allegation was rebuked by the governing party KMT as playing politics over baseball games as well as by the International Olympic Committee as common scheduling practice. The IOC further gave examples of other games being scheduled in a similar matter

The team finished 5th in the tournament.

=== WBSC Premier12 ===
WBSC Premier12
Year	Round	Position	W	L	RS	RA	Ranking
(Japan) (Taiwan) 2015	Group Stage	9th	2	3	27	25	4th
(Japan) (Taiwan) 2019	Super Round	5th	4	3	24	15	4th
(Japan) (Mexico) (Taiwan) 2024	Champions	1st	6	3	40	23	5th
2027	To be determined						
Total	1 Title	3/3	12	9	91	63	

==== 2015 ====
Chinese Taipei came in ninth in the 2015 WBSC Premier12 Tournament.

==== 2019 ====
Chinese Taipei came in fifth in the 12-team 2019 WBSC Premier12 Tournament, in November 2019.

==== 2024 ====
Chinese Taipei won the 12-team 2024 WBSC Premier12 Tournament, ending Japan's 27 winning streak in international tournaments. This is the first time the team has won international tournaments.

=== 2009 IBAF World Cup ===
Chinese Taipei participated in the 2009 Baseball World Cup, which occurred between September 9 and September 27, 2009. The team went 1–2 in the first round, losing to Mexico and Australia, but winning against Czech Republic. Chinese Taipei entered the second round as a wild card. Chinese Taipei went 5–2 in the second round, pulling off victories against Italy, Japan, Netherlands, Australia, and Mexico. The team qualified easily for the final round, but finished in 8th place, going 1–6 and losing the game for a 7th place title.

=== Intercontinental Cup ===
The team's first appearance at the Intercontinental Cup was in 1973. Since then, the team has won two bronze medals, one in 1983 in Belgium and one in 2006 in Taiwan. Taiwan did not participate in the 1975, 1979, 1981, 1993 and 1997 Intercontinental Cups. It is currently ranked 7th in the Medal Winner Ranking. Cuba, Japan, Nicaragua and the United States remain Taiwan's four biggest rivals in the Intercontinental Cup.

As the host of the recent 2006 Intercontinental Cup, Taiwan won its second bronze medal after beating Japan in the 2006 Intercontinental Cup final 4–0.

=== Asian Baseball Championship ===
Chinese Taipei has twice finished in first place, 10 times in second place and 10 times in third. The team competed again in the 2007 Asian Baseball Championship which was held in Taiwan.

==== 2009 Asian Baseball Championship ====
In the 2009 Championship, Chinese Taipei sought their revenge against their humiliating defeat by China at the 2008 Beijing Olympics with an obliterating win of 13–1, crushing the Mainland Chinese baseball team. They proceeded on to the finals against their old time rival Japan. Japan won the match and took the title with a narrow score of 6–5, putting Chinese Taipei in second place. In the final round of the tournament, Chinese Taipei defeated 2008 Olympic baseball champions South Korea with a 5–4 victory. Their next match was played against China, whom they lost to for the first time in history at the 2008 Summer Olympics in Beijing. Chinese Taipei would end up with a 13–1 victory in 7 innings (game ended due to mercy rule) over China. The team would then play a final decisive game against their long-time rival Japan. The Japanese team won 6-5 and took the championship title, having gone 3–0 in the final round. Chinese Taipei would finish as the runner-up, with 2 wins and 1 loss in the last round of the tournament.

==== 2019 Asian Baseball Championship ====
In the 2009 Championship, Chinese Taipei recorded a 2–1 record in pool play to advance to the "Super Round". They had a 4–1 record in the Super Round to advance to the championship game. Facing Japan in the championship game, Chinese Taipei prevailed, 5–4, taking the title and earning a spot in the Olympic Final Qualifying Tournament for the 2020 Summer Olympics.

=== Asian Games ===
Chinese Taipei has not missed any of the Asian Games since its first appearance in 1990 in Beijing. In Beijing, it finished in first place, however, it was a demonstration sport thus it did not receive any medals. Its second appearance was in 1994 where it finished in third place. In 1998, it again finished in third place. Chinese Taipei lost to South Korea in 2002 in Pusan, South Korea and hence finished in second. It was by far its best result. At the 2006 Asian Games in Doha, Qatar, a game-winning walk off hit by Lin Chih-sheng helped to win its first Asian Games baseball gold. The team received seventy million New Taiwan Dollar from the Republic of China (ROC)/Taiwan government for their excellent achievement in Doha. They have finished in second place at the 2010 Asian games being beaten by South Korea 7–6 in the final.

==== Guangzhou Asian Games, 2010 ====
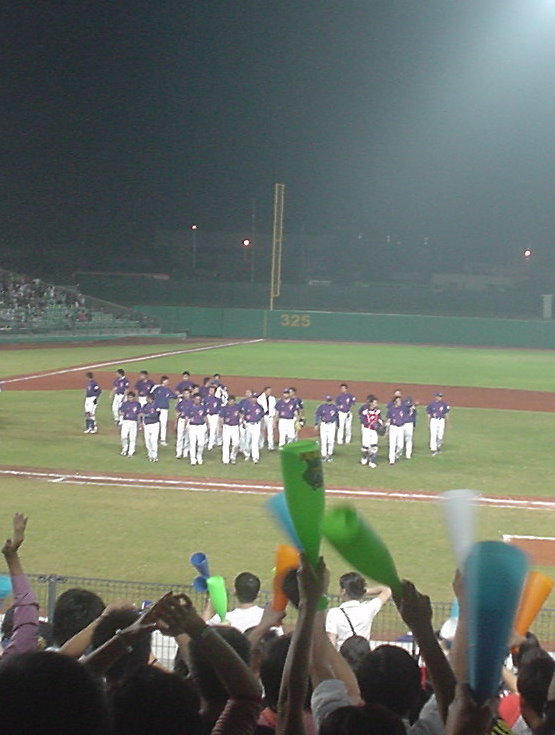
Taiwanese players thank the home fans after losing the semifinal game to Cuba in the 2006 Intercontinental Cup

== Uniform ==
Before 1984		1984 to 1999
Away	Home	Away	Home
1999 to 2003		2003 to 2012
Away	Home	Away	Home
2012 to 2016, 2018 to present		2017 World Baseball Classic		2017 APBC
Away	Home	Away	Home	Away	Home

== Honors and recognition ==
- Asian Baseball Championship
  - Gold: 1983 (Together with Japan and South Korea), 1987, 1989 (Together with Japan and South Korea), 2001, 2019
  - Silver: 1955, 1969, 1985 (Together with South Korea), 2003, 2005, 2009, 2012, 2015
  - Bronze: 1959, 1962, 1963, 1965, 1967, 1971, 1973, 1975, 1993, 1995, 1997, 1999
  - 4th: 1954, 1975
  - 5th: 1971
- Asian Games
  - Gold: 1990 (Demonstration sport), 2006
  - Silver: 2002, 2010
  - Bronze: 1994, 1998
- Intercontinental Cup
  - Bronze: 2006
- Baseball World Cup
  - Silver: 1984
  - Bronze: 1986, 1988, 2001
  - 4th: 1982, 2003
  - 5th: 1973

=== Records ===
- Largest win — 30 - 0 India, (Japan, 26 August 1987)
- Worst defeat — 3 - 20 the Netherlands, (Belgium, 15 July 1983)

== See also ==
- Chinese Taipei women's national baseball team
- Chinese Taipei Baseball Association
- Asian Baseball Championship
- Chinese Professional Baseball League
- Taiwan Series
- World Baseball Classic
- One-China policy
- Cross-Straits relations
