= 2009 World Baseball Classic Pool A =

Pool A of the first round of the 2009 World Baseball Classic was held at Tokyo Dome, Tokyo, Japan from March 5 to 9, 2009.

Pool A was a modified double-elimination tournament. The winners for the first games matched up in the second game, while the losers faced each other in an elimination game. The winners of the elimination game then played the losers of the non-elimination game in another elimination game. The remaining two teams then played each other to determine seeding for the Pool 1.

== Bracket ==
Preliminaries
–	China	0
–	Japan	4
–	Chinese Taipei	0
–	South Korea	9
Lower round 1
L1	China	4
L2	Chinese Taipei	1

Qualifiers
W1	Japan	14
W2	South Korea	2
Lower final
W3	China	0
L4	South Korea	14

Seeding
W4	Japan	0
W5	South Korea	1

== Results ==
- All times are Japan Standard Time (UTC+09:00).

=== Japan 4, China 0 ===
March 5 18:30 at Tokyo Dome
Team	1	2	3	4	5	6	7	8	9	R	H	E
China	0	0	0	0	0	0	0	0	0	0	5	2
Japan	0	0	3	0	0	1	0	0	X	4	5	0
WP: Yu Darvish (1−0) LP: Chenhao Li (0−1); Home runs: CHN: None; JPN: Shuichi Murata (1); Attendance: 43,428 (103.4%); Umpires: HP − Ed Hickox, 1B − Jorge Pérez, 2B − Dana DeMuth, 3B − Daniel Toledo; Boxscore

=== South Korea 9, Chinese Taipei 0 ===
March 6 18:30 at Tokyo Dome
Team	1	2	3	4	5	6	7	8	9	R	H	E
Chinese Taipei	0	0	0	0	0	0	0	0	0	0	5	0
South Korea	6	0	0	0	1	2	0	0	X	9	10	0
WP: Hyun-jin Ryu (1−0) LP: C. C. Lee (0−1); Home runs: TPE: None; KOR: Jin-young Lee (1), Keun-woo Jeong (1); Attendance: 12,704 (30.2%); Umpires: HP − Andy Fletcher, 1B − Daniel Toledo, 2B − Ed Hickox, 3B − Paul Hyham; Boxscore

=== China 4, Chinese Taipei 1 ===
March 7 12:30 at Tokyo Dome
Team	1	2	3	4	5	6	7	8	9	R	H	E
Chinese Taipei	0	0	0	0	0	1	0	0	0	1	7	0
China	1	0	0	0	2	0	0	1	X	4	9	0
WP: Jiangang Lü (1−0) LP: Yueh-ping Lin (0−1) Sv: Kun Chen (1); Home runs: TPE: None; CHN: Ray Chang (1); Attendance: 12,890 (30.7%); Umpires: HP − Dana DeMuth, 1B − Paul Hyham, 2B − Andy Fletcher, 3B − Jorge Pérez; Boxscore

=== Japan 14, South Korea 2 ===
March 7 19:00 at Tokyo Dome
Team	1	2	3	4	5	6	7	8	9	R	H	E
Japan	3	5	0	1	2	2	1	X	X	14	14	0
South Korea	2	0	0	0	0	0	0	X	X	2	4	1
WP: Daisuke Matsuzaka (1−0) LP: Kwang-hyun Kim (0−1); Home runs: JPN: Shuichi Murata (2), Kenji Johjima (1); KOR: Tae-kyun Kim (1); Attendance: 45,640 (108.7%); Umpires: HP − Ed Hickox, 1B − Jorge Pérez, 2B − Andy Fletcher, 3B − Daniel Toledo; Notes: Completed early due to 10–run mercy rule after 7 innings. Boxscore

=== South Korea 14, China 0 ===
March 8 18:30 at Tokyo Dome
Team	1	2	3	4	5	6	7	8	9	R	H	E
China	0	0	0	0	0	0	0	X	X	0	2	2
South Korea	2	0	0	2	5	5	X	X	X	14	10	0
WP: Suk-min Yoon (1−0) LP: Guoqiang Sun (0−1); Home runs: CHN: None; KOR: Bum-ho Lee (1); Attendance: 12,571 (29.9%); Umpires: HP − Andy Fletcher, 1B − Daniel Toledo, 2B − Dana DeMuth, 3B − Paul Hyham; Notes: Completed early due to 10–run mercy rule after 7 innings. Boxscore

=== South Korea 1, Japan 0 ===
March 9 18:30 at Tokyo Dome
Team	1	2	3	4	5	6	7	8	9	R	H	E
South Korea	0	0	0	1	0	0	0	0	0	1	4	0
Japan	0	0	0	0	0	0	0	0	0	0	6	0
WP: Jung-keun Bong (1−0) LP: Hisashi Iwakuma (0−1) Sv: Chang-yong Lim (1); Attendance: 42,879 (102.1%); Umpires: HP − Dana DeMuth, 1B − Paul Hyham, 2B − Ed Hickox, 3B − Jorge Pérez; Boxscore
