= Yi-Cheng Wang =

Taiwanese baseball player (born 1985)

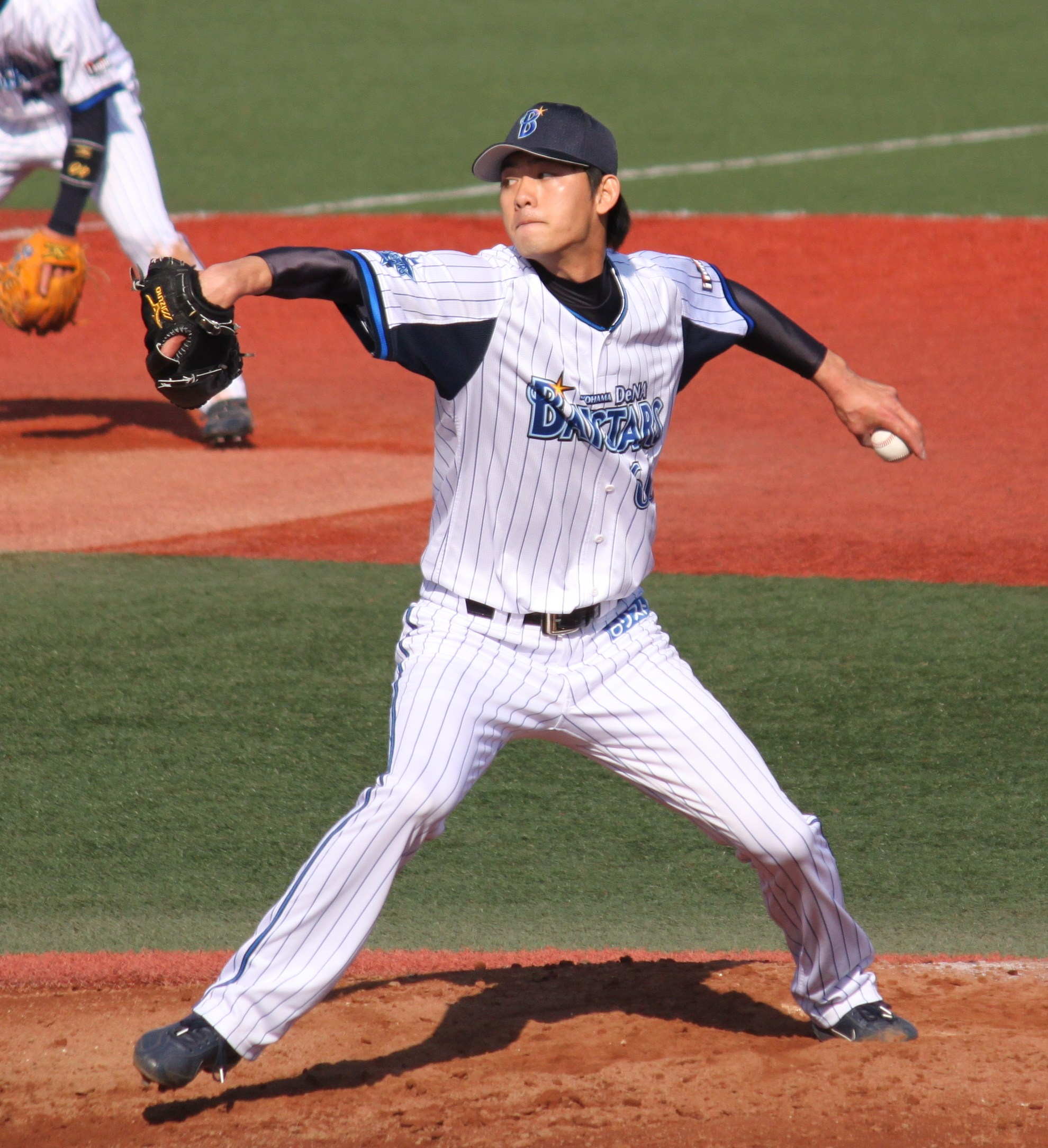

TSG Hawks – No. 32
- Pitcher
- Born: October 9, 1985 (age 40); Pingtung County, Taiwan
- Bats: Left Throws: Left

Professional debut
- NPB: June 6, 2012, for the Yokohama BayStars
- CPBL: July 21, 2013, for the Lamigo Monkeys

NPB statistics (through 2012 season)
- Win–loss record: 0–4
- Earned run average: 8.88
- Strikeouts: 15

CPBL statistics (through 2024 season)
- Win–loss record: 75–50
- Earned run average: 4.98
- Strikeouts: 808
- Stats at Baseball Reference

Teams
- Yokohama BayStars Yokohama DeNA BayStars (2012); Lamigo Monkeys/Rakuten Monkeys (2013–2023); TSG Hawks (2024–present)

Career highlights and awards
- 5x Taiwan Series champion (2014, 2015, 2017-2019)

Yi-Cheng Wang (born October 9, 1985) is a Taiwanese professional baseball coach for the Rakuten Monkeys of the Chinese Professional Baseball League (CPBL). He has previously played in Nippon Professional Baseball (NPB) for the Yokohama DeNA BayStars, and in the CPBL for the Lamigo Monkeys/Rakuten Monkeys.

He attended Chinese Cultural University and represented Chinese Taipei at the 2001 World Youth Baseball Championship, 2009 World Port Tournament, 2009 Asian Baseball Championship, 2009 Baseball World Cup and 2013 World Baseball Classic.

== Career ==
Wang began his professional career with the Yokohama DeNA BayStars of Nippon Professional Baseball in 2010, and played for the club through 2013. In 2013, he joined the Lamigo Monkeys, later rebranded as the Rakuten Monkeys, and played for the club through the 2023 season.

On August 10, 2023, Wang was traded to the TSG Hawks (alongside Weng Wei-chun, Lan Yin-lun, and the negotiation rights to Wang Po-jung) in exchange for Tzu-Wei Lin.
