= Gongguan =

Gongguan or Kungkuan can refer to the following places:

== China ==
- Gongguan, Hepu, a township in Hepu County, Beihai, Guangxi
- Gongguan, Maonan, a township in Maonan, Maoming, Guangdong
- Gongguan, Xunyang, a township in Xunyang County, Ankang, Shaanxi

== Taiwan ==
- Gongguan, Miaoli, a rural township in Miaoli County
- Gongguan, Taipei, a commercial district in Taipei
- Gongguan, Yilan, a section of Zhuangwei, Yilan
- Giljegiljaw Kungkuan, Taiwanese baseball catcher
