= Tzu-Wei Lin =

Taiwanese baseball player (born 1994)

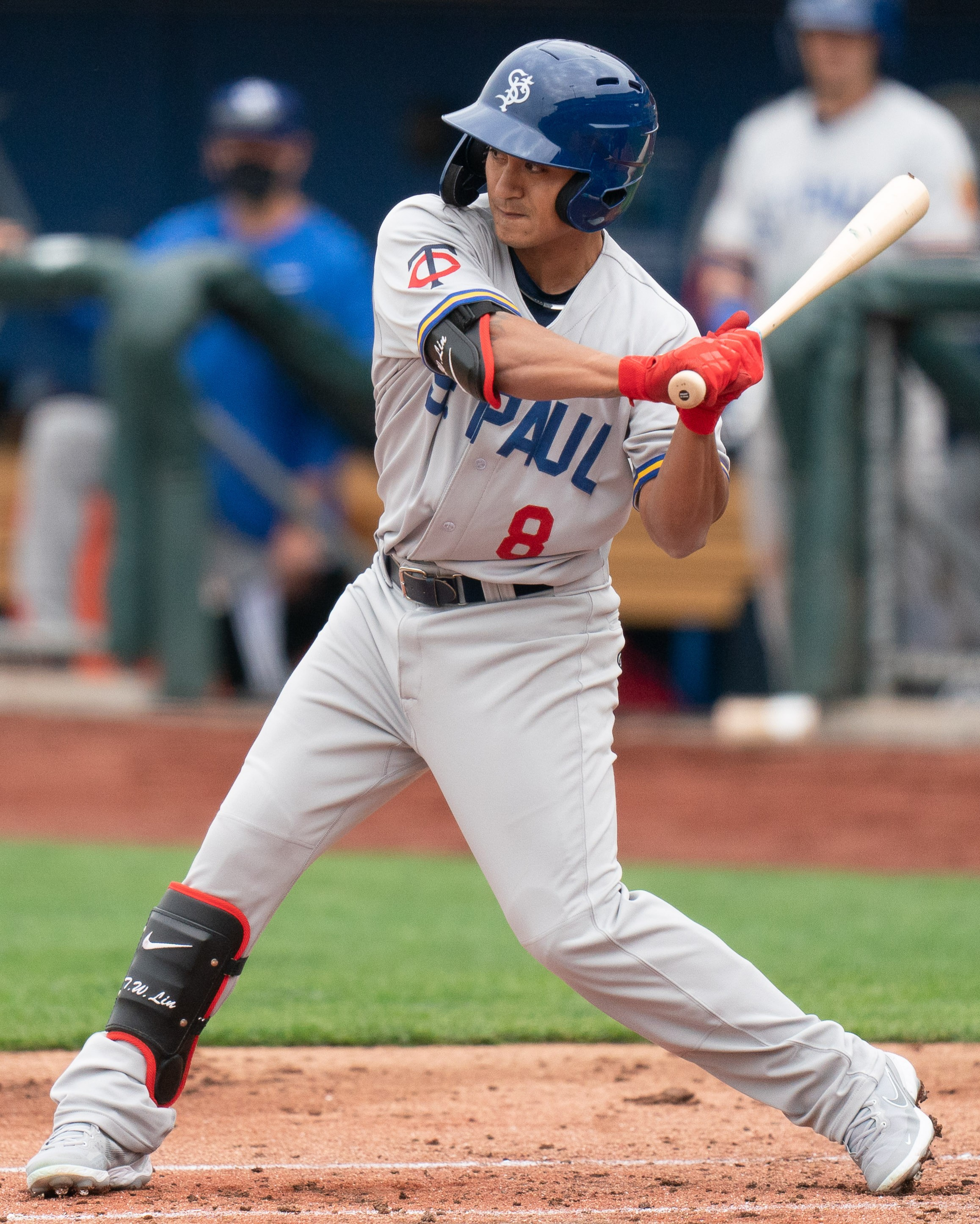
- Lin batting for the Saint Paul Saints in 2021

Rakuten Monkeys – No. 15
- Infielder
- Born: February 15, 1994 (age 32); Kaohsiung County, Taiwan
- Bats: Left Throws: Right

Professional debut
- MLB: June 24, 2017, for the Boston Red Sox
- CPBL: August 19, 2023, for the Rakuten Monkeys

MLB statistics (through 2021 season)
- Batting average: .223
- Home runs: 1
- Runs batted in: 12

CPBL statistics (through 2025 season)
- Batting average: .222
- Home runs: 8
- Runs batted in: 60
- Stats at Baseball Reference

Teams
- Boston Red Sox (2017–2020); Minnesota Twins (2021); Rakuten Monkeys (2023–present)

Career highlights and awards
- Taiwan Series champion (2025)
Medals
Men's baseball
Representing Chinese Taipei
U-18 Baseball World Cup
Gold medal – first place	2010 Thunder Bay	Team
Bronze medal – third place	2012 Seoul	Team
Asian Games
Silver medal – second place	2022 Hangzhou	Team

Tzu-Wei Lin
- Traditional Chinese: 林子偉
- Simplified Chinese: 林子伟
Transcriptions
Standard Mandarin
- Hanyu Pinyin: Lín Zǐwěi
- Wade–Giles: Lin^{2} Tzŭ^{3}-wei^{3}
- IPA: [lǐn tsɹ̩̀.wèɪ]
Southern Min
- Hokkien POJ: Lîm Chí-uí

Tzu-Wei Lin (Chinese: 林子偉; born February 15, 1994), also known as Tahai Isliduan, is a Taiwanese professional baseball infielder for the Rakuten Monkeys of the Chinese Professional Baseball League (CPBL). He has previously played in Major League Baseball (MLB) for the Boston Red Sox and Minnesota Twins.

Listed at 5 feet 9 inches (1.75 m) and 155 pounds (70 kg), Lin bats left-handed and throws right-handed. Scouts view Lin as a capable fielder with an average throwing arm. He is seen as a fast runner and good hitter who could bat .300, though not with much power. He is also known as a patient hitter, foul-tipping pitches often to extend his at bats.

== International career ==
Lin led Taiwan's team to victory in the Junior League World Series in 2010. He played in the 2010 World Junior Baseball Championship, in which Taiwan won the championship. He led all players in the tournament in batting average (.607), on-base percentage (.656), and slugging percentage (.907). For his efforts, Lin was named the tournament's Most Valuable Player, best hitter, and to the All-Tournament Team as a third baseman.

In the 2011 World Youth Baseball Championship, Lin was named best outfielder of the tournament as he played mostly in left field. He also had a catchy nickname, "The Tzunami", because he would destroy opponents like a tsunami does to objects.

Lin played for the Chinese Taipei national baseball team (Note: "Chinese Taipei" is the name for Taiwan by which it and the People's Republic of China recognize each other when it comes to the activities of the International Olympic Committee and its correlates.) in the 2019 Asian Baseball Championship, appearing at second base, shortstop, and left field, as the team won its first title in 18 years. He was named to the national team roster for the 2023 World Baseball Classic. Also in 2023, Cheng appeared in the postponed 2022 Asian Games, competing in five baseball games with four starts, batting .091/.182/.231 in 11 at-bats, and winning a silver medal with Chinese Taipei.

== Professional career ==
Lin agreed to sign a contract with the New York Yankees in 2010, when he was 16 years old, for a signing bonus of $350,000. Though Lin was eligible to sign at the time, the Chinese Taipei Baseball Association threatened to ban Lin from playing or coaching in Taiwan if he signed before completing high school, leading Lin not to complete the deal.

In 2012, Lin agreed to sign a contract with the Boston Red Sox, the Yankees' rivals, receiving a $2.05 million signing bonus, the largest bonus for a Taiwanese position player, the second largest bonus for a Taiwanese player behind Chin-hui Tsao, and the third largest bonus for an Asian amateur after Tsao and Byung-hyun Kim.

=== Minor League Baseball ===
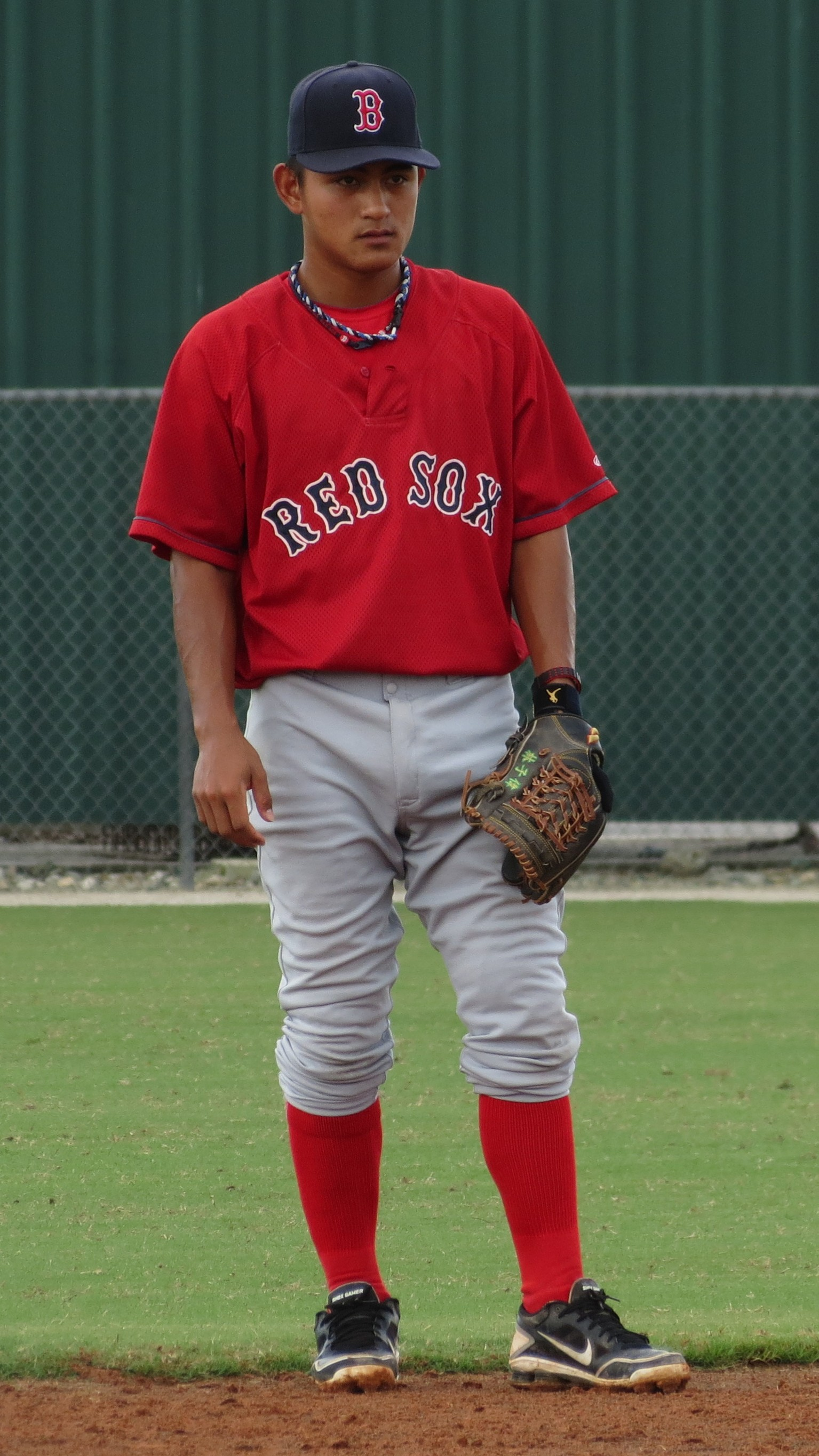
Lin with the Gulf Coast League Red Sox

Lin spent the 2012 season with the rookie-level Gulf Coast League Red Sox, batting .255 with no home runs and 16 RBIs in 29 games. With the Class A Short-Season Lowell Spinners in 2013, he batted .226 with one home run and 20 RBIs in 60 games. Lin played for the Class A Greenville Drive in 2014, batting .229 with one home run and 42 RBIs in 102 games. During 2015, Lin split time between the Class A-Advanced Salem Red Sox and the Double-A Portland Sea Dogs, playing in a total of 119 games while batting .251 with two home runs and 48 RBIs. He then spent the 2016 season with Double-A Portland, batting .223 with two home runs and 27 RBIs in 108 games. Early in the 2017 season, Lin appeared in 48 games with Double-A Portland, batting .302 with five home runs and 19 RBIs in 48 games.

=== Boston Red Sox ===
==== 2017 ====
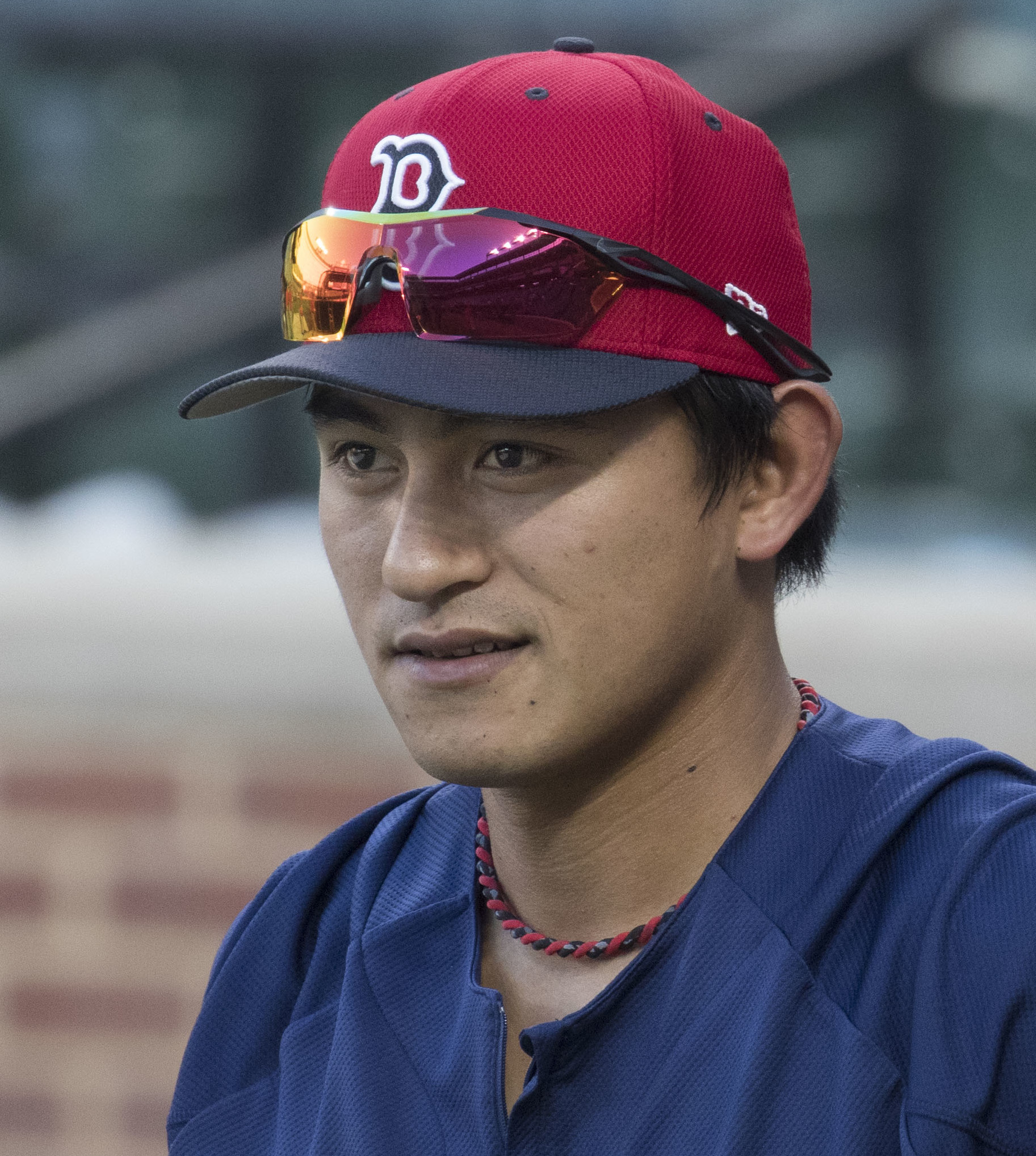
Lin with the Boston Red Sox in 2017

The Red Sox promoted Lin to the major leagues on June 24, 2017, directly calling him up from Double-A. He made his MLB debut that day, as a pinch runner. He recorded his first major league hit during his first major league at bat on June 26, in a 4–1 victory against the Minnesota Twins. After initially wearing uniform number 73 for Boston, he switched to number 5 on July 14. On July 20, Lin was optioned to the Triple-A Pawtucket Red Sox after Brock Holt returned from injury. During his time in Pawtucket, Lin appeared in 35 games, batting .227 with two home runs and nine RBIs. He was later recalled to Boston in September.

Overall with the 2017 Red Sox, Lin appeared in 25 MLB games, batting 15-for-56 (.268) with no home runs and two RBIs; defensively, he played ten games at second base, six games at shortstop, and nine games at third base. Lin was not included on Boston's postseason roster for the 2017 American League Division Series.

==== 2018 ====
Lin started the 2018 season with Triple-A Pawtucket. He was called up to Boston on April 10, made 14 appearances while batting 6-for-32 (.188), and was optioned back to Pawtucket on May 8. After being sent back to Pawtucket, he had a 16-game hitting streak and raised his Triple-A average to .299 for the season. Lin was recalled to Boston on June 23, and sent back to Pawtucket on June 29; he appeared in two games (one start) and batted 0-for-5 during his week with the Red Sox. He was recalled again on July 12, appeared in three games (batting 2-for-7), and was optioned back to Triple-A on July 24. He was recalled by the Red Sox on July 29, made one defensive appearance, and was returned to Pawtucket on July 31. Lin was called up to Boston on September 1, when rosters expanded. He hit his first major league home run on September 21, against right-handed reliever Dan Otero of the Cleveland Indians, he became the third Taiwanese player homered in MLB history. Overall with the 2018 Red Sox, Lin appeared in 37 games, batting 16-for-65 (.246) with one home run and six RBIs. Lin was not included on Boston's postseason roster, as the team went on to win the World Series over the Los Angeles Dodgers.

==== 2019 ====
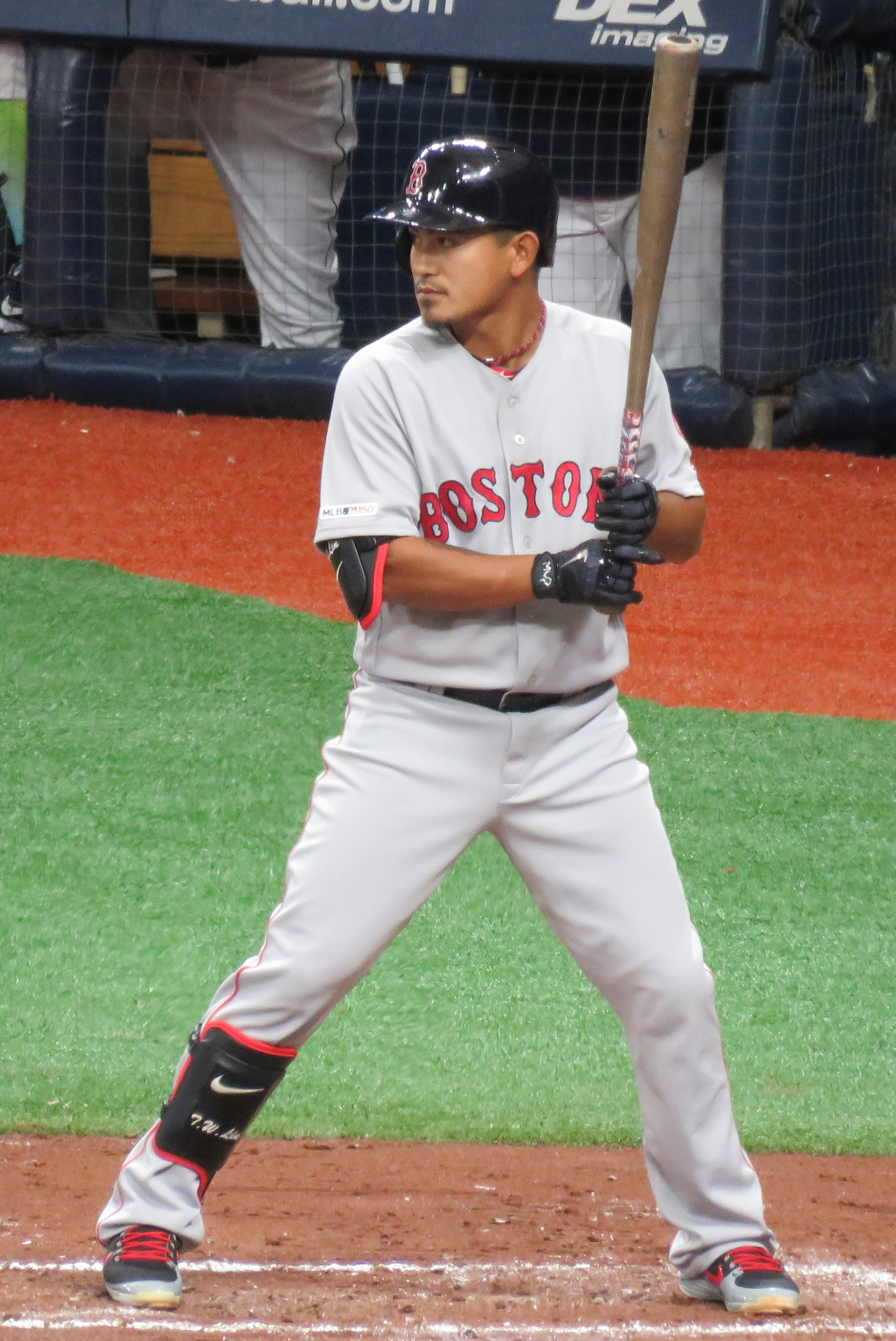
Lin batting for the Boston Red Sox in 2019

In 2019, Lin was optioned to Triple-A Pawtucket prior to Opening Day. He was called up on April 6, when Brock Holt went on the injured list, and optioned back to Pawtucket on April 9, when Dustin Pedroia was activated. Lin was recalled to Boston on April 19 along with Michael Chavis, as both Pedroia and Eduardo Núñez were placed on the injured list. With the 2019 Red Sox only carrying two catchers, manager Alex Cora stated that Lin would be the team's emergency catcher. On May 1, against Oakland Athletics, Lin recorded his 35th MLB hit, passing Chin-lung Hu for most MLB career hits by a Taiwanese player; the majority of Taiwanese players in MLB have been pitchers. On May 3, Lin was removed from a game against the Chicago White Sox after spraining his left knee while sliding into second base; he was placed on the injured list the next day. On June 17, his rehabilitation assignment with Pawtucket was halted due to a right shoulder impingement. He resumed his rehabilitation assignment on June 26, then was activated and optioned to Pawtucket on July 1. Overall during 2019, Lin appeared in 13 games with Boston, batting .200 with one RBI, while with Pawtucket he batted .246 with four home runs and 22 RBIs in 59 games.

==== 2020 ====
During the start-delayed 2020 season, Lin again was a utility player for Boston. Overall with the 2020 Red Sox, he batted .154 with no home runs and three RBIs in 26 games. He also made one pitching appearance, allowing three runs in one inning of relief work. On October 26, Lin was assigned to Triple-A and outrighted off of the 40-man roster. He became a minor-league free agent on November 2, 2020.

=== Minnesota Twins ===
On December 3, 2020, Lin signed a minor-league contract with invitation to spring training with the Minnesota Twins organization. On April 23, 2021, he was selected to the Twins' active roster. On April 29, Lin was designated for assignment after appearing in one game. On May 3, he was outrighted to the Triple-A St. Paul Saints. After appearing in seven Triple-A games during May, during which he batted 7-for-26 (.269), Lin spent the remainder of the season on the injured list.

=== New York Mets ===
On March 16, 2022, Lin signed a minor league contract with the New York Mets. On August 12, 2022, Lin was released by the Mets.

=== Long Island Ducks ===
On August 16, 2022, Lin signed with the Long Island Ducks of the Atlantic League of Professional Baseball. He appeared in 17 games for the Ducks, hitting .307/.411/.565 with 3 home runs, 9 RBI, and 2 stolen bases.

On February 21, 2023, Lin re-signed with the Ducks for the 2023 season. In 45 games for the team, he hit .270/.376/.500 with 7 home runs, 23 RBI, and 7 stolen bases.

=== Rakuten Monkeys ===
On July 3, 2023, Lin announced that he would enter the 2023 CPBL draft. On July 12, Lin was selected by the TSG Hawks with the 1st overall pick of the draft. On July 21, the Hawks reached an agreement with Ducks to officially purchase his contract.

On August 10, 2023, Lin was traded to the Rakuten Monkeys in exchange for Weng Wei-chun, Wang Yi-cheng, Lan Yin-lun, and the negotiation rights to Wang Po-jung. On August 16, Lin and the Monkeys agreed to a contract worth NT$31 million over two years and four months. He made 20 appearances for the team, slashing .205/.280/.274 with one home run, 12 RBI, and three stolen bases.

Lin made 98 appearances for Rakuten in 2025, batting .241/.307/.352 with three home runs, 33 RBI, and 13 stolen bases. With the Monkeys, Lin won the 2025 Taiwan Series.

== Personal life ==
Lin, a native of Namasia District, Kaohsiung, is of Taiwanese Aboriginal tribe Bunun descent. His name in Bunun language is Tahai Isliduan.

== See also ==
- List of Major League Baseball players from Taiwan
