= Tsuyoshi Nishioka =

Japanese baseball player (born 1984)

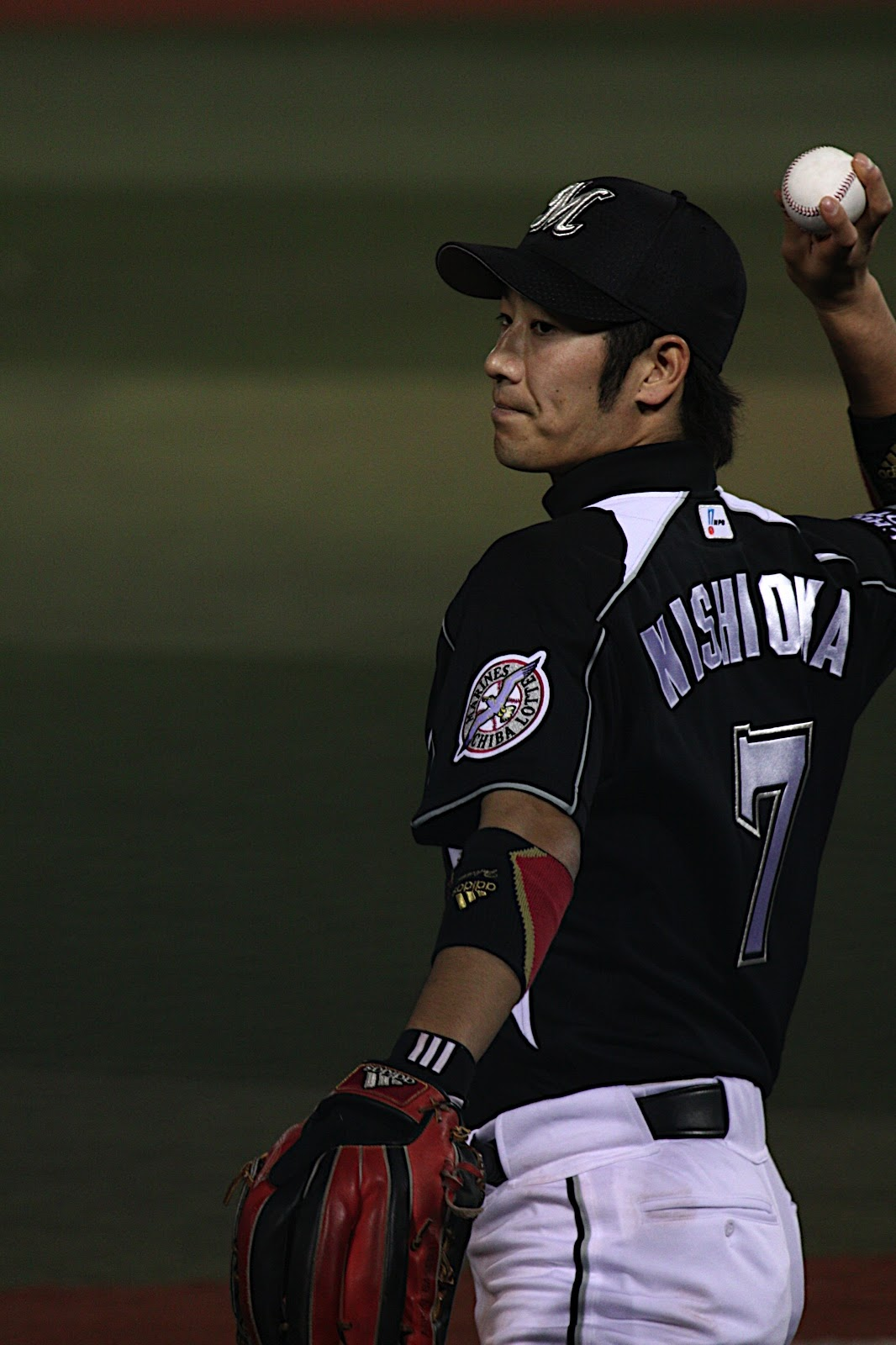
- Nishioka with the Chiba Lotte Marines in 2010

Chiba Lotte Marines – No. 77
- Infielder
- Born: July 27, 1984 (age 42); Daitō, Osaka, Japan
- Batted: Switch Threw: Right-handed

Professional debut
- NPB: June 23, 2003, for the Chiba Lotte Marines
- MLB: April 1, 2011, for the Minnesota Twins

Last appearance
- MLB: August 8, 2012, for the Minnesota Twins
- NPB: September 17, 2018, for the Hanshin Tigers

NPB statistics
- Batting average: .288
- Home runs: 61
- Runs batted in: 383

MLB statistics
- Batting average: .215
- Home runs: 0
- Runs batted in: 20
- Stats at Baseball Reference

Teams
- Chiba Lotte Marines (2003–2010); Minnesota Twins (2011–2012); Hanshin Tigers (2013–2018); As coach: Chiba Lotte Marines (2026–present)

Career highlights and awards
- 2× Japan Series champion (2005, 2010); 5× NPB All-Star (2005–2008, 2010); 3× NPB Best Nine Award (2005, 2007, 2010); 3× NPB Golden Glove Award (2005, 2007, 2010); 2× NPB stolen base leader (2005–2006); 2010 Pacific League Batting Champion
Medals
Men's baseball
Representing Japan
World Baseball Classic
Gold medal – first place	2006 San Diego	Team

Tsuyoshi Nishioka (西岡 剛, Nishioka Tsuyoshi; born July 27, 1984) is a Japanese former professional baseball infielder and current hitting and first base coach for the Chiba Lotte Marines of Nippon Professional Baseball (NPB). He played in NPB for the Marines and Hanshin Tigers, and in Major League Baseball (MLB) for the Minnesota Twins.

Nishioka played in the 2006 World Baseball Classic as well as the 2008 Beijing Olympics as a member of the Japanese national team. In 2010, he became the fifth person to record 200 hits in a single NPB season.

== Early life ==
Nishioka was born in Daitō, Osaka, and grew up in the city of Nara. He played in the national tournament as a member of Kōriyama Senior while attending Nara Prefectural Heijō East Junior High School, starting baseball as a right-handed hitter and switched to the left side during junior high.

Nishioka led Osaka Tōin to the 84th National High School Baseball Championship in his senior year of high school as the team captain and leadoff hitter, but the team lost in the first round to Tōhō High School, the Aichi champions. Despite his lack of success on the national stage, Nishioka hit 42 home runs in his high school career, mostly as a second baseman, and was considered one of the top high school prospects in the country by NPB scouts. He was selected in the first round of the 2002 NPB amateur draft held that fall by the Chiba Lotte Marines.

== Professional career ==
=== Chiba Lotte Marines (2003–2010) ===
==== Early years (2003–2004) ====
In 2003, his rookie season, Nishioka was assigned to the ichigun (Japanese equivalent of "major league") team during Spring training, but he was sent down to the nigun team ("minor league" or "farm team") for the season opener. He was called up to the ichigun team in mid-June and made his professional debut on June 23 as a pinch runner, hitting a double off then-Orix BlueWave right-hander Hisashi Tokano in his very first plate appearance on June 28 for the first hit of his professional career. However, he was sent back down to the minors after a few games. His .216 batting average was the lowest among all qualifying players in the Eastern League.

Nishioka followed the advice of coach Yoshihiko Takahashi and become a switch hitter in his second year in the pros (2004). (He remains one of the few examples of a naturally right-handed player switching from hitting left-handed to hitting switch in Japanese professional baseball today.) He hit his first career home run at the ichigun level off then-Seibu Lions right-hander Mitsutaka Goto on June 27 and recorded his first career stolen base in the same game. He finished with six homers and 35 RBI for the season (though his average was just .255 and his on-base percentage a mere. 304).

==== Breakout (2005–2006) ====
Nishioka had a breakout year in 2005, starting as a backup infielder but starting at both second base and shortstop alongside veterans Koichi Hori and Makoto Kosaka in an unorthodox platoon system as the season went on. He hit just .268 but led the Pacific League in triples (11) and stolen bases (41), playing a key role in the Marines' first Japan Series championship since 1974. His splitting time between the two middle infield positions created an unusual situation in which he won the Pacific League Best Nine Award at shortstop and the Golden Glove Award at second base (incidentally, double-play partners Hori and Kosaka were awarded the Best Nine Award at second base and the Golden Glove Award at shortstop, respectively).

Coming off a strong showing in the inaugural World Baseball Classic, his first major international tournament, Nishioka was named one of the cornerstones of the team by manager Bobby Valentine in 2006 and was used exclusively at shortstop for the first time in his career to reduce the risk of injury (Nishioka had hurt his knee the previous year after switching between second base and shortstop so frequently). Though the Marines finished fourth that year, Nishioka improved on his batting average (hitting .282) and on-base percentage (.358) from the previous season. Though he led the league in triples (seven, tied with Munenori Kawasaki, Shogo Akada and Teppei Tsuchiya) and stolen bases (33) for the second straight season, he was also caught stealing a league-high 17 times, resulting in a stolen base percentage of just 66 percent.

==== 2007–2010 ====
On January 7, Nishioka publicly announced that he would have his name listed on the Marines' official roster as "TSUYOSHI" (much like how Ichiro Suzuki used his first name on the back of his uniform during his years with the BlueWave, but in the Latin alphabet capital letter rather than in Katakana) rather than his actual Japanese name in Kanji characters for the 2007 season. This is the third case a Japanese player's register name use capital letter after Tsuyoshi Shinjo and Michael Nakamura.

Despite being hampered by a wrist injury as well as neck pain, Nishioka reached .300 while accumulating enough plate appearances to qualify for the batting title for the first time in his career. However, while he succeeded in improving on both his batting average and his on-base percentage from the previous season (.300 and .366, respectively), he managed to steal only 27 bases in 40 attempts for a mediocre 67.5 percent success rate.

Nishioka announced that he would have his name listed as "Tsuyoshi Nishioka" again for the 2008 season, exactly one year (January 7) after his announcement to change it to "TSUYOSHI". He continued to be plagued by injuries (both to his knee and neck as well as to his feet) but chose to play through them, determined to keep the Marines within reach of the Climax Series (playoffs). His injuries limited him to just 18 stolen bases (his lowest total since becoming the team's regular shortstop) in 29 attempts for a success rate of 62.1 percent and hindered his play both on the basepaths and in the field. On the other hand, he hit .300 for the second straight year, hitting double-digit home runs (13) and slugging over .400 over a full season (.463) for the first time in his career even though he missed time due to the Beijing Olympics held in August.

Nishioka was named to the national team's preliminary roster for the upcoming World Baseball Classic in early 2009 along with teammate Shunsuke Watanabe, but was ultimately cut from the final 28-man team. He continued to be bothered by injuries once the regular season began, hitting .263 for the month of April (albeit with a .391 on-base percentage) but missing several games in the opening weeks of the season with a right hamstring injury as well as a bruise to the right tarsus suffered when sliding into second base to break up a double play and colliding with second baseman Yosuke Takasu in the fifth inning of a game against the Tohoku Rakuten Golden Eagles on April 16.

Following the 2010 season, in which Nishioka led the league with 206 hits, a .346 batting average and 121 runs scored, the Chiba Lotte Marines accepted a $5 million bid through the posting system, giving the Minnesota Twins thirty days to work out a contract with Nishioka. On December 17, Nishioka officially signed with the Twins for $9 million over three years, with a club option for 2014 or a $250,000 club buyout.

=== Minnesota Twins (2011–2012) ===
Nishioka joined the Minnesota Twins for spring training at their facility in Fort Myers, Florida to start the 2011 MLB season. During spring training, Twins manager Ron Gardenhire announced that Nishioka would play second base for the Twins, allowing Alexi Casilla to become the starting everyday shortstop. Nishioka made his MLB debut with the Twins on April 1. In his first major league game he went 1–3 with one strikeout and one fielding error. On April 7, just one week into his Major League career, Nishioka suffered a broken left fibula as New York Yankee outfielder Nick Swisher slid into second base attempting to break up a double play. After missing 59 games, Nishioka returned on June 16 to start against the Chicago White Sox, going 1 for 4 while batting third and playing shortstop. Nishioka's 2011 season stats for the Twins included a .226 batting average in 221 at-bats, 14 runs scored, 19 RBIs, 0 homers, 15 walks, 43 strikeouts, an OBP of .278 and a .249 slugging percentage.

On March 19, 2012, the Twins optioned Nishioka to their Class AAA affiliate, the Rochester Red Wings. In early August, Nishioka was recalled by the Twins due to an injury to third baseman Trevor Plouffe and a trade that sent another third baseman, Danny Valencia, to the Boston Red Sox. However, in three games after rejoining the big league club, Nishioka went 0–12 with three errors and 1 RBI. On August 20, the Twins outrighted Nishioka back to Rochester.

On September 28, Nishioka asked for a release from his contract, which was granted by the organization. Soon after, Nishioka signed a contract with the Hanshin Tigers and finished the season with the team. On December 18, Nishioka signed a contract with Hanshin for the 2013 season.

=== Hanshin Tigers (2013–2018) ===
In his first season with Hanshin, Nishioka played 122 games with a .290 batting average and was mainly used as the team's leadoff batter and second baseman. However, during the interleague matches he complained of knee pain and was used as a designated hitter. On August 30 in a match against Hiroshima he made his first career start at third base. At the end of his season he received a Best Nine Award which was his fourth overall but his first as a second baseman.

On March 30, 2014, Nishioka, fielding at second base, collided with right fielder Kosuke Fukudome while attempting to catch a fly ball. He struck the back of his head on the hard Tokyo Dome ground and was taken from the field in an ambulance. He returned to the team at the end of June, but a series of injuries saw him play just 24 games in the season. He participated in the Tigers' post-season campaign and was involved in a controversial call in the final play of the Japan Series against the Fukuoka Hawks. With one out and bases loaded at the top of the ninth inning, Nishioka was struck by the ball thrown by the catcher to first base after a play at home plate. Nishioka was called out for interference due to running inside the baseline, thereby ending the match and the series.

He was designated for assignment by the Tigers on October 1, 2018, and became a free agent on December 2.

=== Tochigi Golden Braves (2019) ===
On March 13, 2019, Nishioka signed with the Tochigi Golden Braves of the Baseball Challenge League, having missed the 2018 season due to an injury.

== International career ==
=== 2006 World Baseball Classic ===
Nishioka's first stint with the Japanese national team came in the inaugural World Baseball Classic held in 2006. He played in all eight games and hit .255 with two home runs and five stolen bases as the team's No. 2 hitter and starting second baseman, driving in eight runs and scoring five and playing an integral role in Japan's championship run.

Nishioka was involved in a play that attracted much attention in the second round game against the United States on March 12 when his attempt to score on a routine sacrifice fly by Akinori Iwamura with the score tied in the eighth inning was nullified by a controversial call by home plate umpire Bob Davidson, who (seemingly incorrectly) ruled that Nishioka had left third base too early (Japan went on to lose the game 4–3). The play was rather sensationalistically dubbed the "Bad Call of the Century" by the Japanese media. (Incidentally, Davidson came under fire yet again for another dubious call he made later in the tournament in a game between the United States and Mexico.)

=== 2008 Beijing Olympics ===
Nishioka was named to the Japanese national team for the second time for the 2008 Beijing Olympics, playing in eight of Japan's nine games and recording the highest batting average (.455), on-base percentage (.556), and slugging percentage (.636) of any player on the team who logged more than 10 at-bats. However, despite being viewed as one of the favorites to win the gold prior to the tournament, Japan lost to South Korea in the semi-finals on August 22, and to the United States in the bronze medal match held the following day, finishing fourth behind South Korea, Cuba and the United States.

== Coaching career ==
On October 17, 2025, the Marines announced Nishioka had joined the team as a coach, replacing Akira Otsuka in his role as hitting and baserunning coach after the latter resigned.

== Playing style ==
=== Hitting ===
Listed at 182 cm (6 ft 0 in) and 80 kg (180 lb), Nishioka's frame is just slightly larger than average for a Japanese middle infielder. He is a somewhat unusual hitter in that he switched from hitting left-handed to hitting switch in the pros despite being naturally right-handed. Though he hit 42 home runs and was known as a slugger during his high school career, Nishioka's offensive reputation has taken somewhat of a backseat to that of his defense in the pros. He has made strides in both plate discipline as well as power since first coming into the pros (slugging a career-high .463 in 2008), but remains largely a prototypical leadoff man and contact hitter, adept at beating out infielders' throws or bunting safely (particularly push-bunting) to get on base. Nishioka has said that one of his goals as a hitter is to win a batting title.

=== Baserunning ===
Nishioka has finished among the league leaders in stolen bases numerous times, but was clocked at an only moderately fast 6.1 seconds in the 50-meter dash in high school and does not have blazing speed. Though he has made a name for himself as a base stealer by becoming skilled at reading pitchers' motions and getting good jumps rather than relying on his outright speed, his career stolen base percentage remains a mediocre 71.6 percent (65.5 percent from 2006 to 2008), a success rate that pales in comparison to that of elite base stealers like Hanshin Tigers outfielder Norihiro Akahoshi and Yomiuri Giants outfielder Takahiro Suzuki. (Modern sabermetric theory suggests that a team's run production is only positively affected by stolen bases when a player is successful at a rate of at least 70 to 75 percent.)

=== Fielding ===
Nishioka has many attributes that make him a skilled shortstop, including quick reflexes, soft hands and an exceptional throwing arm (he clocked 142 km/h (88 mph) in his first pitch in an informal pre-game contest in 2006). He has some of the best range of any Japanese shortstop; though he logged time at second base earlier in his career and can man both middle infield positions quite proficiently, manager Bobby Valentine played him almost exclusively at shortstop since 2006 to lessen the stress placed on his lower body. In 2011, Nishioka committed 12 errors while playing in just 68 games for the Twins. In three games in 2012, Nishioka committed three errors, which included misplaying an infield popup.

== Personal life ==
Nishioka's wife, Naoku Tokuzawa, gave birth to a daughter in 2011 but filed for divorce later that same year. Dave DeLand wrote in the Star Tribune that "Other than perhaps Moammar Gadhafi, you'd be hard-pressed to find someone who had a worse year in 2011 than Nishioka."
