= Wilton Veras =

Dominican baseball player (born 1978)

- Third baseman
- Born: January 19, 1978 (age 48); Monte Cristi, Dominican Republic
- Batted: Right Threw: Right

MLB debut
- July 1, 1999, for the Boston Red Sox

Last MLB appearance
- June 30, 2000, for the Boston Red Sox

MLB statistics
- Batting average: .262
- Home runs: 2
- Runs batted in: 27

CPBL statistics
- Batting average: .325
- Home runs: 26
- Runs batted in: 200
- Stats at Baseball Reference

Teams
- Boston Red Sox (1999–2000); Macoto Cobras (2005); Chinatrust Whales (2008); Sinon Bulls (2009–2010)

Wilton Andrés Veras (born January 19, 1978) is a Dominican former backup third baseman in Major League Baseball who played from 1999 to 2000 for the Boston Red Sox. Listed at 6' 2", 198 lb., he batted and threw right-handed. He once held the Taiwanese Chinese Professional Baseball League single season record for hits, attaining 176 in 2009 for the Sinon Bulls. The record was broken in 2016 by Lamigo Monkeys rookie Wang Po-Jung's 200.

In a two-season career, Veras was a .262 hitter (74-for-282) with two home runs and 27 RBI in 85 games, including 35 runs, 12 doubles and two triples.

Veras also played in the Red Sox and Brewers's minor league systems (1995–2003), the New Jersey Jackals of the Northeast/Can-Am leagues (2004/2006–2007), the Mexican League's Dorados de Chihuahua (2008) and CPBL's Macoto Cobras (2005), Chinatrust Whales (2008), and Sinon Bulls (2009–10). In 12 minor league seasons, he hit .272 with 67 home runs and 570 RBI in 1163 games.

== See also ==
- Players from Dominican Republic in Major League Baseball
