= Wang Po-jung =

Taiwanese baseball player (born 1993)

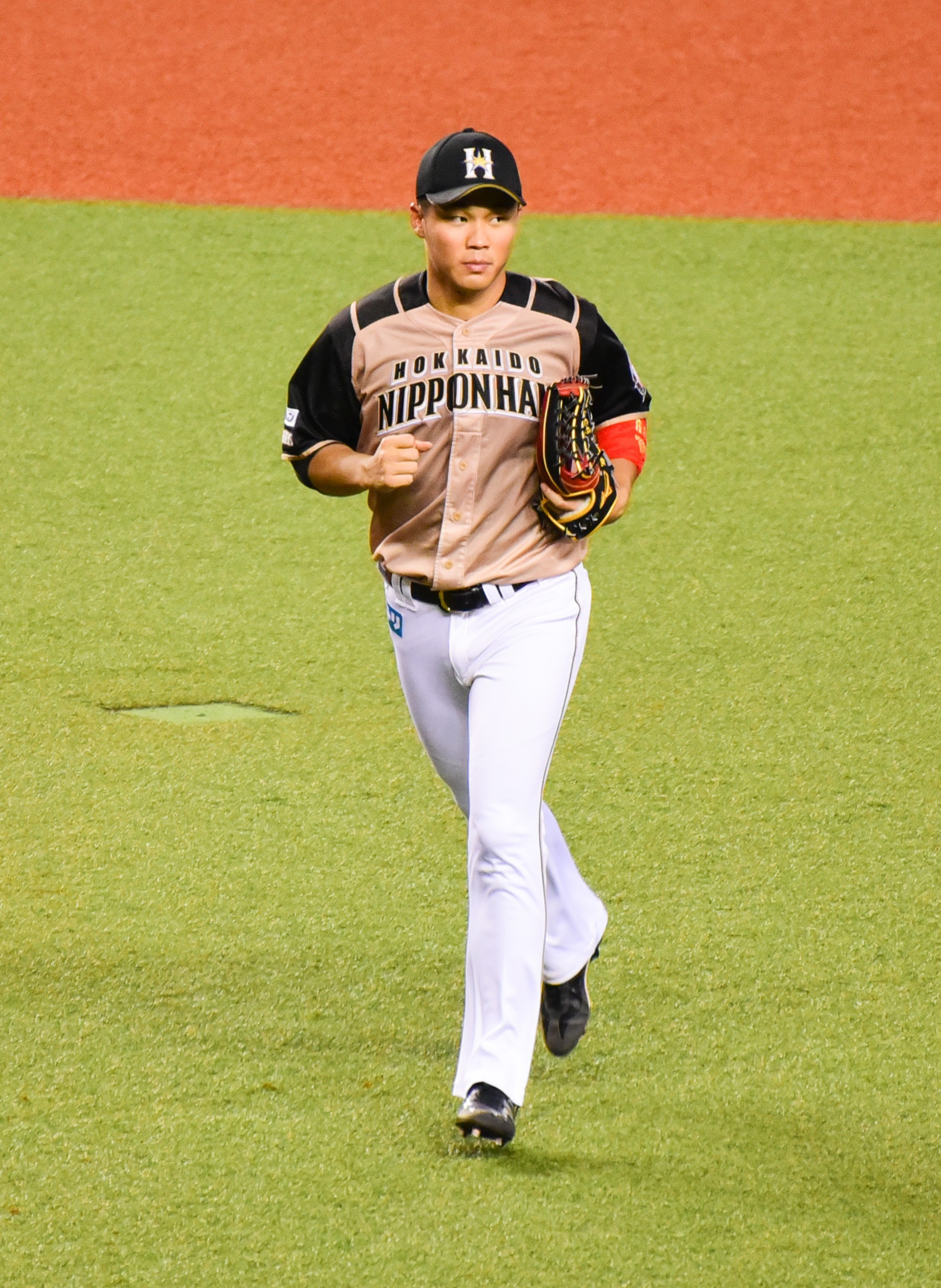
- Wang with the Hokkaido Nippon-Ham Fighters

TSG Hawks – No. 9
- Outfielder
- Born: September 9, 1993 (age 32); Pingtung County, Taiwan
- Bats: Left Throws: Right

Professional debut
- CPBL: September 2, 2015, for the Lamigo Monkeys
- NPB: March 29, 2019, for the Hokkaido Nippon-Ham Fighters

CPBL statistics (through April 16, 2026)
- Batting average: .341
- Home runs: 100
- Runs batted in: 456

NPB statistics (through 2023 season)
- Batting average: .235
- Home runs: 15
- Runs batted in: 97
- Stats at Baseball Reference

Teams
- Lamigo Monkeys (2015–2018); Hokkaido Nippon-Ham Fighters (2019–2023); TSG Hawks (2024–present)

Career highlights and awards
- CPBL: 3× Taiwan Series Champion (2015, 2017, 2018); Taiwan Series MVP (2015); Quadruple Crown (2017); 2× CPBL RBI leader (2016–2017); 2× CPBL Batting champion (2016–2017); 2× CPBL Hits leader (2016–2017); CPBL Home Run leader (2017); 2× CPBL MVP of the Year (2016–2017); 2× CPBL Best Ten (2016–2017); 2× CPBL Gold Glove Award (2016–2017); CPBL Rookie of the Year (2016); 2× CPBL All-Star (2016–2017); Hits, single season (200); Batting average, single season (.414); Chinese Taipei national baseball team: Asia Professional Baseball Championship Best Ten (2017)
Medals
Men's baseball
Representing Chinese Taipei
Asian Games
Silver medal – second place	2014 Asian Games	Team
2014 U-21 Baseball World Cup
Gold medal – first place	2014 U-21 Baseball World Cup	Team
2015 Summer Universiade
Gold medal – first place	2015 Summer Universiade	Team

Wang Po-jung (Chinese: 王柏融; born September 9, 1993), nicknamed "The King (Dawang)", is a Taiwanese professional baseball outfielder for the TSG Hawks of the Chinese Professional Baseball League (CPBL). He has previously played in the CPBL for the Lamigo Monkeys, and in Nippon Professional Baseball (NPB) for the Hokkaido Nippon-Ham Fighters. He is regarded one of the greatest Taiwanese hitting talents ever.

== Career ==
=== Lamigo Monkeys ===
Wang with the Lamigo Monkeys

Wang debuted with the Lamigo Monkeys of the Chinese Professional Baseball League (CPBL) in 2016. During his rookie season, Wang broke a number of league records. Among them, he became the first player to record 200 hits in the league and finished with a .414 batting average. In 2017, he batted .407 and led the CPBL with 31 home runs. On September 3, 2016, Wang became the fastest CPBL player (122 games) to reach 200 career hits. On October 10, 2016, he became the first CPBL player to record 200 hits in a single season, breaking Wilton Veras' prior record of 176 set in 2009. He finished the year with an unprecedented .414 batting average.

On October 17, 2018, Lamigo announced it intended to post Wang after the Taiwan Series, on November 4. This made Wang the first player to be posted in league history. On November 20, The Lamigo Monkeys accepted the posting fee from the Hokkaido Nippon-Ham Fighters, which gave the Fighters the rights to negotiate to Wang for the next 30 days.

=== Hokkaido Nippon-Ham Fighters ===
On December 7, 2018, Wang Po-jung signed with the Hokkaido Nippon-Ham Fighters, agreeing to a three-year contract.

=== TSG Hawks ===
On August 10, 2023, Wang's CPBL rights were traded to the TSG Hawks alongside Wang Wei-chun, Wang Yi-cheng, and Lan Yin-lun in exchange for Tzu-Wei Lin. On December 13, Wang agreed to a three–year, $1.2 million contract with the Hawks. On January 18, 2024, Wang was announced as captain of the Hawks by manager Hong I-chung.

== International career ==
He was selected for the Chinese Taipei national baseball team at the 2014 U-21 Baseball World Cup, 2014 Asian Games, 2015 Summer Universiade, 2015 WBSC Premier12, 2017 Asia Professional Baseball Championship, 2019 WBSC Premier12, and 2023 World Baseball Classic.

He was also selected as a member of a CPBL All-Stars team for a 2017 exhibition game against Japan. Playing on February 28, 2017, Wang hit a two-run home run against Nippon Professional Baseball strikeout champ Takahiro Norimoto as part of a 3-for-3, three RBI effort. The next day he had a base hit in two at-bats against Yomiuri Giants ace Tomoyuki Sugano.

Awards
Preceded by Lin Chih-sheng(林智勝)	CPBL MVP of the Year Award; 2016-17	Succeeded by Chen Chun-Hsiu(陳俊秀)
