= Chen Chiang-ho =

Taiwanese baseball player

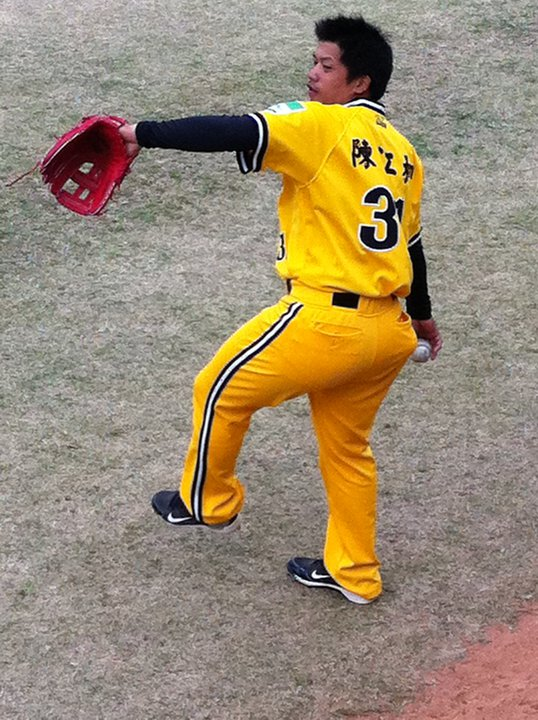

CTBC Brothers – No. 31
- Infielder / Coach
- Born: 15 January 1982 (age 44); Taiwan
- Bats: Right Throws: Right

CPBL debut
- March 18, 2007, for the Brother Elephants

CPBL statistics
- Batting average: .258
- Home runs: 13
- Runs batted in: 304
- Stats at Baseball Reference

Teams
- As player: Brother Elephants / Chinatrust Brothers (2007–2019); As coach: CTBC Brothers (2020–present)

Chen Chiang-ho (Chinese: 陳江和; pinyin: Chén Jiānghé; born 15 January 1982, in Taiwan) is a Taiwanese former professional baseball infielder. He is the current bench coach and hitting coach for the CTBC Brothers of the Chinese Professional Baseball League (CPBL). He played in the CPBL for the Chinatrust Brothers.

== Career statistics ==
Season	Team	G	AB	H	HR	RBI	SB	BB	SO	RBI	DP	AVG
2007	Brother Elephants	63	176	47	2	26	1	9	31	56	5	0.267
2008	Brother Elephants	65	232	60	0	21	3	13	33	69	3	0.259
Total	2 years	128	408	107	2	47	4	22	64	125	8	0.262

== See also ==
- Chinese Professional Baseball League
- Brother Elephants
