= Jyun-Yue Tseng =

Jyun Yue Tseng
- Tseng in 2018.

Fubon Guardians – No. 60
- Pitcher
- Born: November 7, 2001 (age 25); Taichung City, Taiwan
- Bats: Right Throws: Right
- Stats at Baseball Reference

Jyun-Yue Tseng (born November 7, 2001) is a Taiwanese professional baseball pitcher for the Fubon Guardians of the Chinese Professional Baseball League.

Tseng played in the 2014 Little League World Series. He debuted with the Guardians in 2021 and won the CPBL Rookie of the Year Award. Tseng has pitched for the national team in the 2023 World Baseball Classic and 2026 World Baseball Classic.

Tseng will be posted to Major League Baseball teams in the 2026-27 offseason.
