= Giljegiljaw Kungkuan =

Taiwanese baseball player (born 1994)

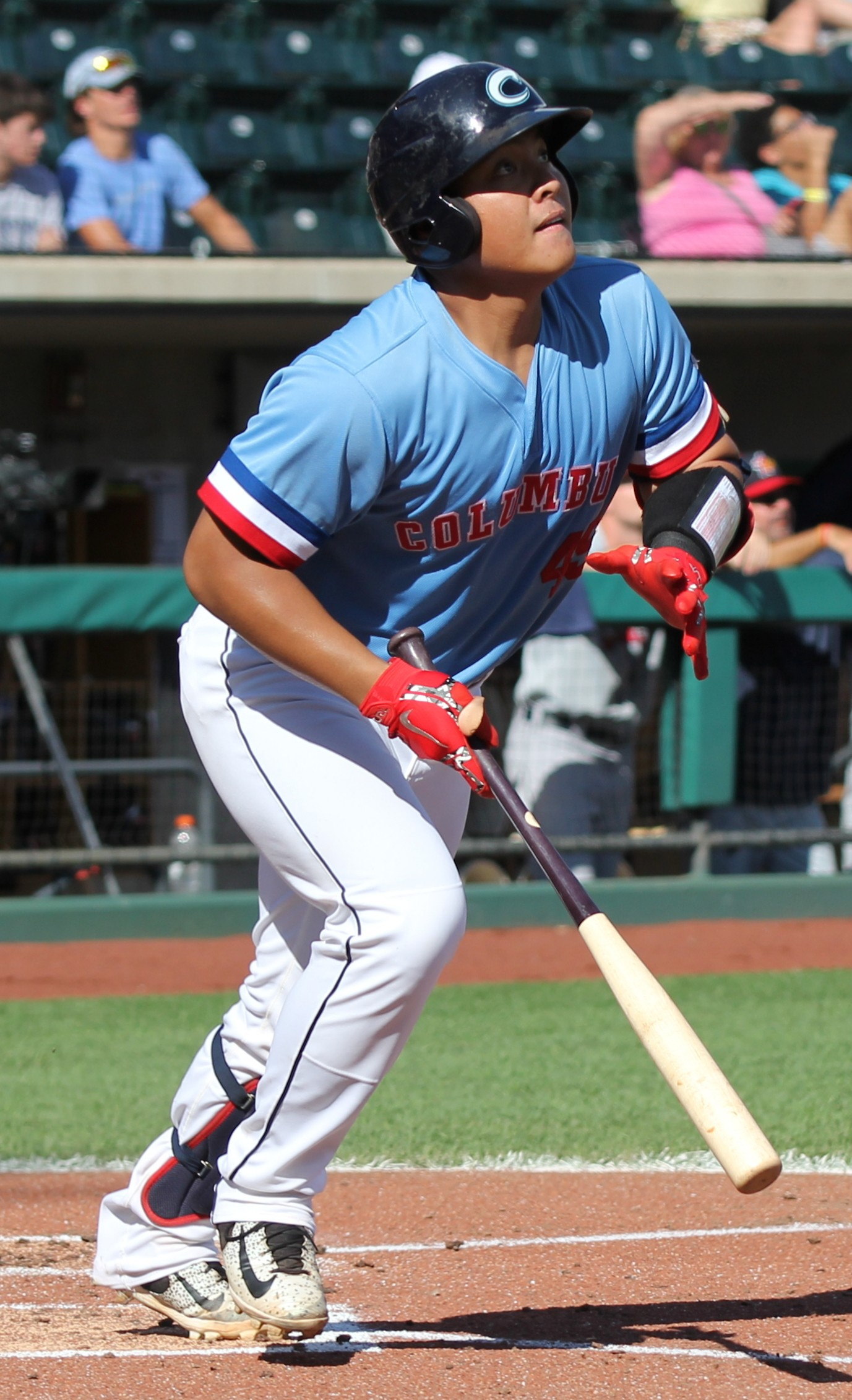
- Kungkuan with the Columbus Clippers in 2018

Wei Chuan Dragons – No. 4
- Catcher
- Born: March 13, 1994 (age 32); Taichung, Taiwan
- Bats: Right Throws: Right

CPBL debut
- August 25, 2021, for the Wei Chuan Dragons

CPBL statistics (through 2025)
- Batting average: .277
- Home runs: 95
- Runs batted in: 319
- Stats at Baseball Reference

Teams
- Wei Chuan Dragons (2021–present)

Career highlights and awards
- Taiwan Series champion (2023); 2× CPBL Home Run leader (2022–2023); CPBL RBI leader (2025); 3× CPBL All-Star (2023–2025)
Medals
Men's baseball
Representing Chinese Taipei
WBSC Premier12
Gold medal – first place	2024	Team

Giljegiljaw Kungkuan (Paiwan pronunciation: [ɡiʎəˈɡiʎaw kuŋˈkuan]; Chinese: 吉力吉撈·鞏冠; pinyin: Jílìjílāo Gǒngguān; born March 13, 1994, in Taichung, Taiwan), also known as Giljaw or Giyaw, previously known as Chu Li-Jen (Chinese: 朱立人), is a Taiwanese professional baseball catcher for the Wei Chuan Dragons of the Chinese Professional Baseball League (CPBL). Giljegiljaw signed with the Cleveland Guardians as a free agent in 2012, and stayed with the organization until 2020 when he left to play for the Dragons.

== Professional career ==
=== Cleveland Indians ===
Giljegiljaw began his professional career with the Cleveland Indians as a non-signed free agent, being signed on November 29, 2012, by Jason Lynn and Allen Lin. He was signed for $40,000 as one of several players from Taiwan the team was signing at the time. From 2014 to 2016, Giljegiljaw spent time with the rookie-level Arizona League Indians, Low-A Mahoning Valley Scrappers, and Single-A Lake County Captains, failing to get more than 150 plate appearances in a season.

The 2017 season with the Single-A Lake County saw Giljegiljaw break this streak by getting 518 plate appearances and getting selected as a Midwest League Postseason All-Star. In 125 appearances for the team, he batted .269/.339/.426 with 17 home runs and 67 RBI. Giljegiljaw spent time with the High-A Lynchburg Hillcats, Double-A Akron RubberDucks, and Triple-A Columbus Clippers in 2018, slashing .272/.340/.425 with 10 home runs and 51 RBI.

Giljegiljaw spent the 2019 season with Akron, playing in 60 games and hitting .229/.290/.357 with five home runs and 25 RBI. He did not play in a game in 2020 due to the cancellation of the minor league season because of the COVID-19 pandemic. Giljegiljaw became a free agent on November 2, 2020.

=== Wei Chuan Dragons ===
In the 2021 CPBL draft, Giljegiljaw was selected second overall by the Wei Chuan Dragons. On August 20, 2021, the Dragons announced they had agreed to a 2.4-year, NT$12.93 million contract with Giljegiljaw. Along with the monthly salary from the contract, it included a NT$850,000 incentive bonus. He didn't play in a game for the main team until 2021, where he spent some time with the minor league team before joining the major club's roster. That season, he hit .256/.310/.458 with 11 home runs and 32 RBI across 54 games.

In 2022, Giljegiljaw became the CPBL home run champion by hitting 14 home runs, the fewest home runs hit by a home run champion in the league. This lowered number was caused by a change to the balls used by the league, which lowered the ball's coefficient of restitution and raised the seams. That season, he played in 88 contests and slashed .286/.350/.481 with 56 RBI in addition to his home runs.

== International career ==
Giljegiljaw played in the 2008 PONY World Series and was the home run derby winner.

Giljegiljaw was selected for the Chinese Taipei national baseball team at the 2023 World Baseball Classic. In 12 at bats, he got 4 hits and a home run.

== Personal life ==
Giljegiljaw is an Indigenous Taiwanese and belongs to the Paiwan tribe. He was previously known by the Han Chinese name Chu Li-Jen, which his father Kuljelju Kungkuan (Chu Hsin-de) chose in tribute to Sun Li-jen. He has used his Paiwan name, meaning "brave warrior" and given to him by his grandmother, with his family and adopted it legally in 2019 so that it would be written on his jersey while playing for Cleveland. He is also known by the childhood nickname "Giyaw" and his teammates in Cleveland, finding "Giljegiljaw" difficult to pronounce, called him "Gilly".
