= Bob Davidson (umpire) =

American baseball umpire (born 1952)

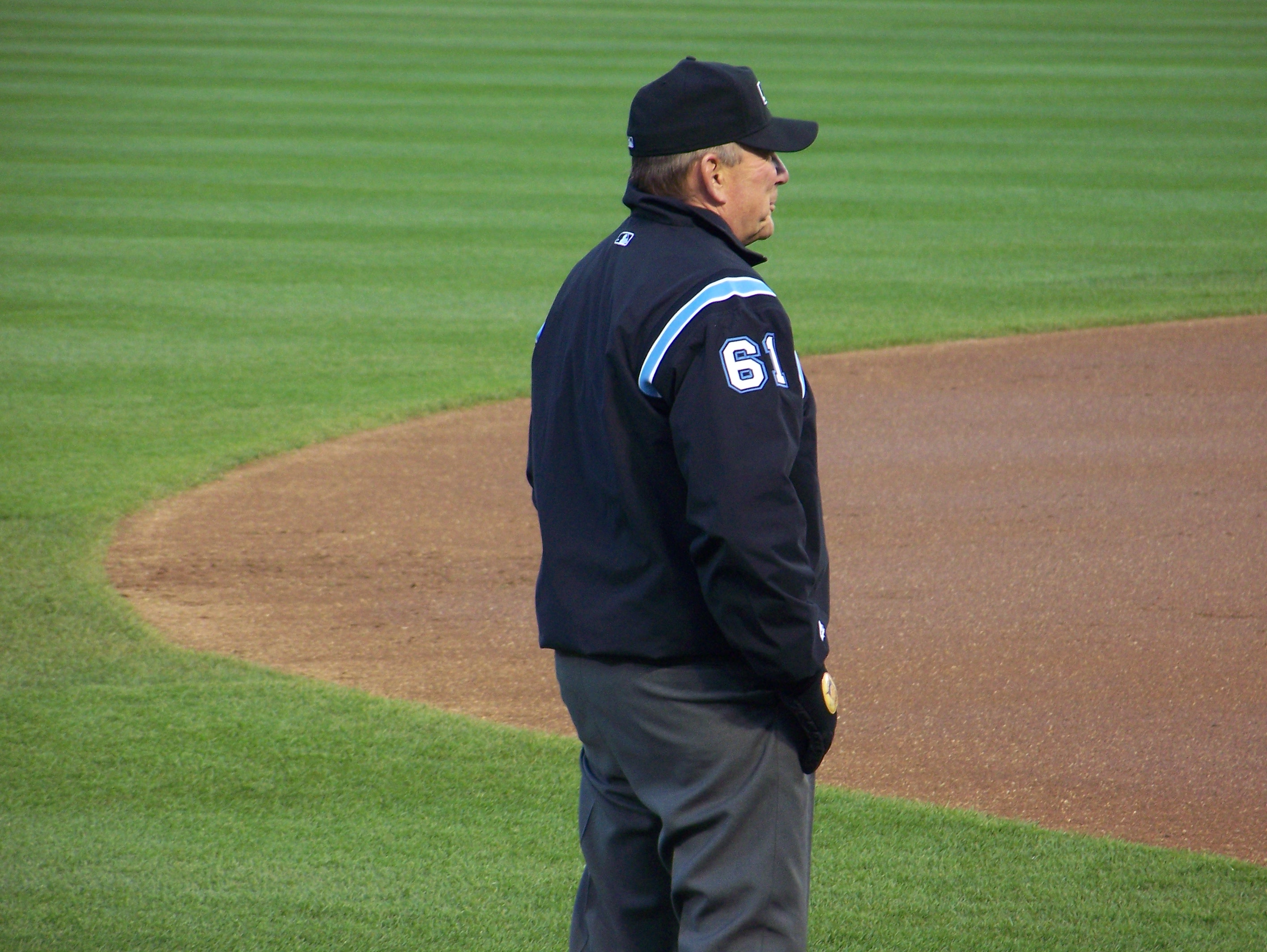
- Davidson umpiring a game at Camden Yards in April 2007
- Born: August 3, 1952 (age 74); Chicago, Illinois, U.S.

debut
- May 31, 1982

Last appearance
- October 2, 2016

Career highlights and awards
- Special assignments: All-Star Games (1987, 1993, 2014); League Championship Series (1988, 1991, 1996); World Series (1992); Division Series (1995, 1998, 2009); World Baseball Classic (2006)

Robert Allan Davidson (born August 3, 1952) is an American former umpire in Major League Baseball (MLB). Nicknamed "Balkin' Bob" and "Balk-a-Day Bob" for his tendency to liberally invoke baseball's balk rule, Davidson was an umpire on the National League (NL) staff from 1982 to 1999, and he was on the combined MLB umpiring staff from 2005 to 2016. He worked one World Series (1992) and several other postseason series.

A former baseball player at the University of Minnesota Duluth (UMD), Davidson spent several years umpiring in the minor leagues before he was promoted to the NL in 1982. In 1999, he was one of nearly two dozen umpires to participate in a mass resignation that was intended as a union bargaining tactic. The maneuver backfired when baseball officials simply replaced those umpires. During four years away from professional baseball, Davidson hosted a sports radio show and worked as a college baseball umpire.

Davidson returned to minor-league umpiring in 2003. After prolonged negotiations and legal battles, baseball officials promoted Davidson back to the major leagues in 2007.

== Early life ==
After graduating from Duluth East High School in Duluth, Minnesota, Davidson played baseball at the University of Minnesota Duluth. In the mid-1970s, Davidson went to umpiring school in St. Petersburg, Florida, with a friend and former Duluth East and UMD baseball teammate. Davidson graduated at the top of his class at the umpire academy, and he was given an assignment in the minor leagues.

Davidson spent eight years as a minor-league umpire, and his assignments included the Midwest League, Florida State League, Southern League and the American Association. He also umpired in the Florida Instructional League and in a winter league in the Dominican Republic during those years.

== MLB career ==
Davidson was on the full-time umpiring staff for the National League (NL) from 1982 to 1999. He wore uniform number 31 during his career in the NL.

Davidson officiated in the 1992 World Series, as well as the National League Championship Series in 1988, 1991 and 1996. He also worked in the National League Division Series in 1995, 1998 and 2009, and in the 1987, 1993, and 2014 All-Star Games. Nicknamed "Balkin' Bob" or "Balk-a-day-Bob" due to his frequent balk calls, Davidson was voted by players and managers as one of the worst umpires in MLB, placing fourth-worst in a Sports Illustrated poll in 2011.

=== Resignation ===
Davidson resigned from the NL staff in 1999 as part of a failed mass resignation during labor negotiations. Instead of furthering negotiations, the resignations backfired when baseball officials accepted the resignations and replaced the umpires with people who did not belong to the union. Reflecting on the resignations several years later, Davidson criticized the move orchestrated by umpire union executive Richie Phillips, saying, "I went from being cocky, to just being plain dumb, to realizing I'm lucky I have a job. What we did in 1999 was just asinine. We were victims of our own success. Phillips had always beaten baseball, but baseball had enough. They called our bluff. It was a huge wake-up call."

During the baseball off-season and during his late 1990s hiatus from baseball, Davidson was a part-time talk show host for 850 KOA in Denver, the radio broadcast partner of the Colorado Rockies. Davidson said that he was not very good on talk radio, leading the station to dismiss him. He also umpired baseball at the collegiate level during the period after his resignation from the major leagues.

In 2000, MLB officials negotiated with the dismissed umpires, agreeing to give Davidson and nine others their jobs back. However, the agreement was contingent upon Richie Phillips dropping his lawsuit against the league, and Phillips did not agree to do that. A December 2001 district court ruling upheld the terminations of Davidson and several other umpires.

== Return to umpiring ==
Davidson was out of professional baseball until 2003, when he resumed umpiring in the minor leagues. His first minor-league assignment was in the Class A Northwest League. Davidson, who was making $160,000 per year in the major leagues, earned $1800 per month during the league's three-month season and he traveled by car between the league's baseball parks in the northwestern U.S. and Canada. An article in the Seattle Post-Intelligencer estimated that Davidson might work his way back to the major leagues by 2008.

In December 2004, he and fellow resignees Tom Hallion and Ed Hickox were guaranteed three of the next five positions on the MLB umpire staff, with Davidson reportedly guaranteed the first vacancy. Davidson returned in 2007 to umpiring MLB games after Joe Brinkman retired. Brinkman said that he was glad to find that his spot went to Davidson, because he considered Davidson a friend.

Number 31 was worn by umpire Mike Reilly in the American League (AL), and it was assigned to Reilly when the AL and NL merged their umpiring staffs in 2000, so when Davidson returned to MLB, he was assigned 61 as his new number. For the 2011 season, he wore number 6, later changing back to 61.

== Criticism and suspension ==
Davidson was sometimes sharply criticized for his on-field performance, especially for the manner in which he handled confrontations. He was ranked the fourth-worst umpire in the major leagues in a 2011 poll of MLB players. That year, Aaron Gleeman of NBC Sports wrote that Davidson was "one of the worst and definitely the most confrontational umpire in baseball."

On May 15, 2012, during a game in Philadelphia, Davidson and Phillies' catcher Brian Schneider bumped into each other during a play involving a strike three wild pitch. Jason Castro, batting for Houston at the time, was able to safely make it to first base on the play. Davidson yelled into the Philadelphia dugout "You think I wanted to block his ass? What the hell are you yelling about?" These expletives were clearly audible on television broadcasts of the game. During the argument, Philadelphia manager Charlie Manuel was ejected by Davidson. Three days later, MLB suspended Davidson from umpiring one game because of "repeated violations of the Office of the Commissioner's standards for situation handling". According to MLB, the suspension resulted from a "culmination of several incidents" as well as Davidson's conduct during the argument with Manuel. Manuel was also suspended for one game.

== Other notable calls ==
- On August 23, 1989, Davidson ejected Montreal Expos mascot Youppi! from a game against the Los Angeles Dodgers following repeated complaints from Dodgers manager Tommy Lasorda.
- On October 20, 1992, Davidson missed Kelly Gruber's tag on Deion Sanders during Game 3 of the 1992 World Series, costing the Toronto Blue Jays a World Series Triple Play.
- On September 21, 1998, Davidson controversially ruled that a ball hit by St. Louis Cardinals slugger Mark McGwire in Milwaukee County Stadium was a ground rule double instead of a home run. Davidson said that a fan reached over the outfield fence to catch the ball, interfering with a ball in play. The home run would have been the 66th of the season for McGwire, who had broken Roger Maris's single-season home run record earlier that month. McGwire and Cardinals president Bill DeWitt said after watching replays that they thought it should have been ruled a home run, and DeWitt attempted to appeal the ruling to Major League Baseball.
- On May 16, 2009, Davidson ejected Anaheim Angels pitcher John Lackey after just two pitches after the latter threw behind Texas Rangers second baseman Ian Kinsler, then hit him with the next pitch. It was Lackey's first start of the season after spending the first month on the disabled list. This came after Kinsler hit two home runs against the Angels the previous night.
- On August 5, 2010, Gaby Sánchez of the Florida Marlins hit a hard ground ball down the third base line which was ruled foul by Davidson. However, subsequent replays showed that the ball landed just in fair territory, bounced over the base and landed again in fair territory, sparking outrage from the Marlins dugout. The Philadelphia Phillies went on to win the game in ten innings by a score of 5–4. Davidson later stated, "In my opinion, where it goes over the bag, you can't tell. ... I'm very confident I got it right. What the ball did when it went past me is irrelevant."
- On September 7, 2010, Davidson and fellow umpire Tim Timmons ejected four people during a game between the St. Louis Cardinals and the Milwaukee Brewers. In the bottom of the second, Timmons ejected Brewers manager Ken Macha after Timmons ruled interference on Craig Counsell. In the bottom of the third inning, Davidson ejected Cardinals pitching coach Dave Duncan for arguing balls and strikes from the dugout. Later, after the bottom of the fifth inning, Davidson ejected Brewers batter Chris Dickerson after Dickerson threw his helmet and bat to the ground after taking a called third strike for the third out. The final ejection occurred during the bottom of the seventh inning when Davidson ejected a fan for heckling Cardinals catcher Yadier Molina.

== Personal life ==
Davidson is married to Denise and has two daughters, Amber and Andrea, and two grandchildren, Alana and Brock. He resides in Colorado. In 2010, Davidson was elected into the University of Minnesota Duluth Athletic Hall of Fame.

== Retirement ==
Davidson announced his retirement at the end of the 2016 MLB season.

== See also ==
- List of Major League Baseball umpires (disambiguation)
