= Ramon Armendariz =

American baseball umpire (born 1972)

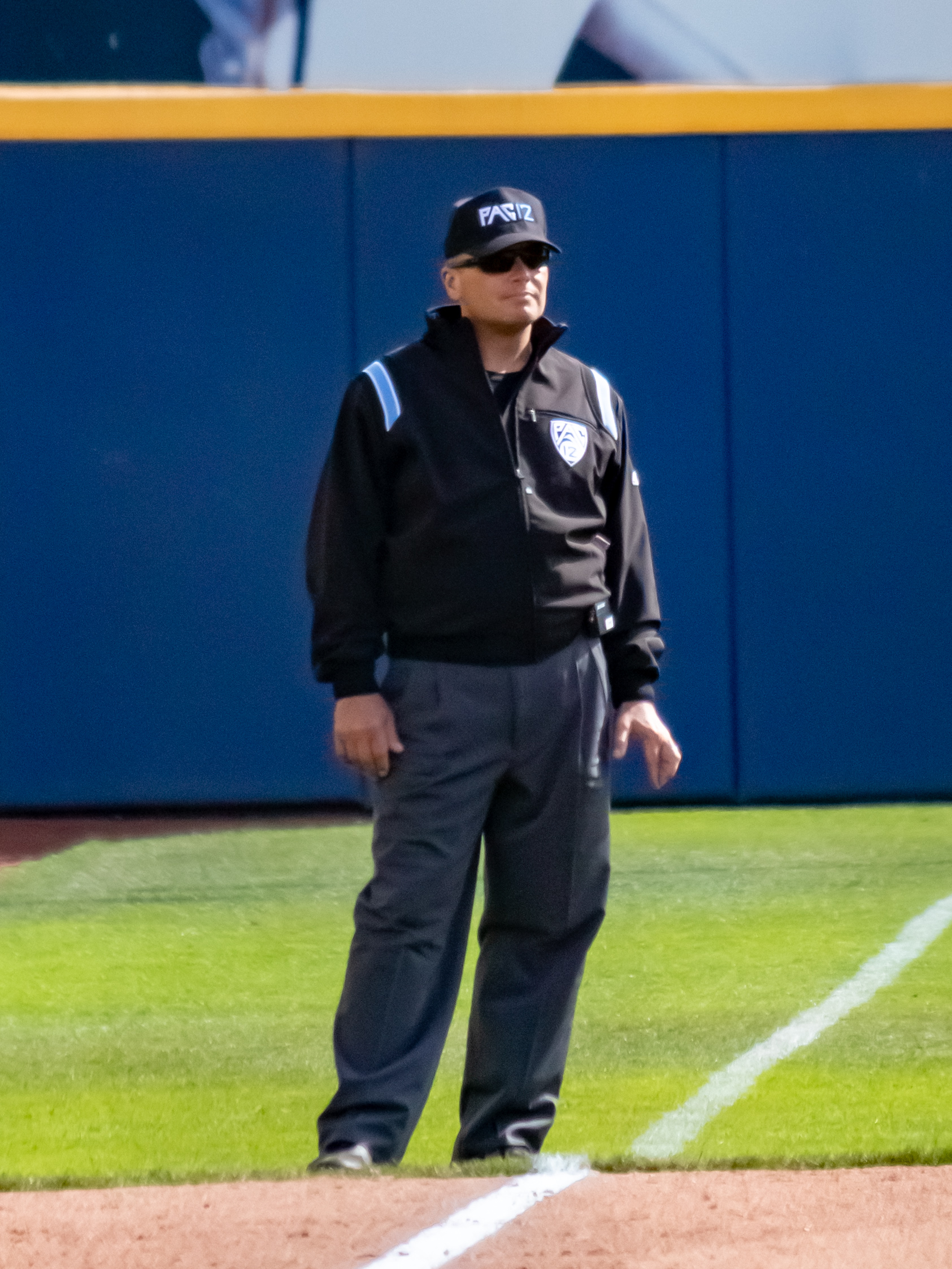
- Armendariz in a Pac-12 game in 2022
- Born: Ramon Armendariz; September 8, 1972 (age 53); Los Angeles, California, U.S.
- Occupation: Umpire
- Years active: 2004–2007
- Height: 5 ft 9 in (175 cm)

Ramon Armendariz (born September 8, 1972) is an American former Major League Baseball umpire. Armendariz was used as an MLB reserve umpire from 2004 to 2007, umpiring a total of 61 games.

== Career ==
Armendariz graduated from the Harry Wendelstedt Professional Baseball Umpire School in 1995. From 1995 through the 1998 season, Armendariz umpired in Rookie League and Class A minor league baseball. In 1999, he was promoted to the AA Texas League. The following year he advanced to the AAA Pacific Coast League, where he umpired through 2007. He spent 2008 and 2009 in the Chinese Professional Baseball League.

Outside of the regular season, Armendariz worked in the MLB Arizona Fall League from 2000 to 2004. He also umpired in the 2006 World Baseball Classic and completed three stints in Latin American winter baseball leagues.

== Notable games ==
As a reserve umpire in 2004, Armendariz worked at first base for Greg Maddux's 299th career win on July 27.

== Return from China ==
Armendariz is currently the junior varsity baseball coach for Santa Monica High School. He umpires college baseball in the Western Athletic Conference and in the Pac-12 Conference.

== See also ==
- List of Major League Baseball umpires (disambiguation)
