= Ed Hickox (umpire) =

American baseball umpire (born 1962)

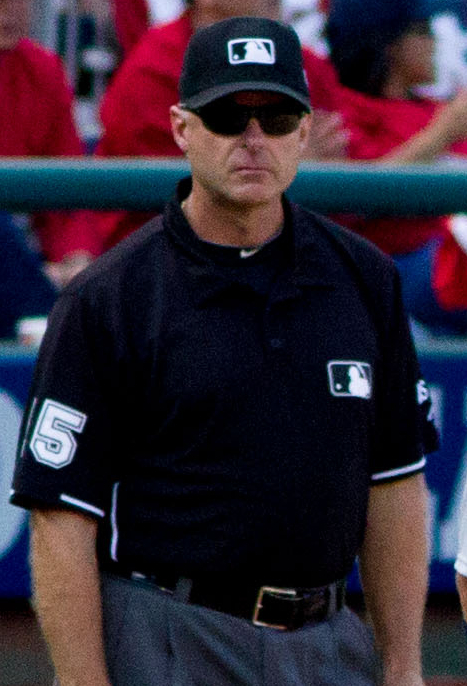
- Hickox in 2012
- Born: July 31, 1962 (age 63); DeLand, Florida, U.S.

MLB debut
- May 16, 1990

Last appearance
- August 7, 2022

Career highlights and awards
- Special Assignments: All-Star Games (2011); Division Series (2007, 2010, 2012, 2019, 2020); World Baseball Classic (2006, 2009, 2013)

Edwin William Hickox (born July 31, 1962) is an American retired Major League Baseball umpire. He worked in the American League from 1990 to 1999 and in Major League Baseball from 2005 until his retirement in 2023. Hickox wore uniform number 39 with the American League and number 15 with Major League Baseball. He officiated the Division Series in 2007, 2010, 2012, and 2019 and 2020, as well as the 2011 Major League Baseball All-Star Game.

== Early life ==
Hickox became an Eagle Scout in 1979. He graduated from DeLand High School and St. Johns River Community College, where he played baseball. He completed training at the Harry Wendelstedt Umpire School in 1983.

== Career ==
Hickox went on to umpire for several of baseball's minor leagues, and worked regularly as a substitute in the AL before his formal promotion to the league's staff in 1999. He resigned his position following the 1999 season as part of a failed union bargaining strategy; he worked in the minor leagues before becoming an MLB reserve umpire in 2005 following the adoption of a new union contract. He returned as a full member of the major league staff in 2007. Hickox worked the inaugural World Baseball Classic in 2006. He also worked the 2009 and 2013 World Baseball Classics.

Hickox is known for wearing his plate coat over his chest protector when he works the plate, forgoing the pullover shirt or pullover jacket. He also wears the new hockey-style mask, and is one of the only two MLB umpires to wear a hat underneath it (the other being Kerwin Danley).

A Hardball Times report listed Hickox as having one of the smallest strike zones in baseball during the 2011 season.

As of 2018, Hickox had umpired 2,418 MLB regular season games (593 of which were plate appearances) and 12 MLB playoff games (0 plate).

He retired on February 12, 2024.

=== Injuries ===
Hickox sustained several significant injuries throughout his career, notably while serving as a home plate umpire. On May 14, 2005, Hickox suffered an "inner ear injury including concussion and several broken [facial] bones" while wearing a Wilson-manufactured "sample" mask that Hickox alleged was defective, filing a lawsuit against the manufacturer for failing to inform Hickox that his product had not been tested with the same stringency given to other hockey style face masks. Hickox won the lawsuit against Wilson Sporting Goods and the subsequent appeal on January 31, 2013, receiving a $775,000 award for lawyer's fees and medical bills based on the court's finding that Wilson had failed to manufacture a safe product that failed to protect Hickox from the aforementioned injuries.

On April 18, 2009, Hickox suffered another significant concussion and left ear injury after another foul ball to the face. The incident, which occurred at Yankee Stadium also involved a Wilson umpire mask. Hickox filed another complaint against Wilson, alleging mental anguish following the mask having "cracked into pieces upon impact" and failure to "protect an umpire in the way it is reportedly designed to do."

On July 12, 2013, while working the plate at Dodger Stadium, Hickox was struck by an eighth-inning foul ball—a 99 miles-per-hour fastball—in the mask, though he remained in the game through its completion one inning later. The day following the incident, Hickox was replaced by fill-in umpire Lance Barrett due to a probable concussion.

== Notable games ==
On September 4, 1993, Hickox was the third base umpire for New York Yankees pitcher Jim Abbott's no-hitter against the Cleveland Indians.

He was at second base when Boston Red Sox pitcher Clay Buchholz no-hit the Baltimore Orioles on September 1, 2007.

On April 16, 2009, Hickox was the second base umpire for the first game ever at the New Yankee Stadium.

On April 18, 2009, Hickox was struck in the helmet by a foul ball in the 6th inning of the Cleveland Indians–New York Yankees game. He remained in the game until the 8th inning, and then apparently went to the hospital. Following the incident, he was reported to be out for a week of recuperation. Because this was the second serious concussion of his career, he was placed on the disabled list for the remainder of the 2009 season and returned in 2010.

He was the home plate umpire for Tampa Bay Rays pitcher Matt Garza's no hitter against the Detroit Tigers on July 26, 2010.

On May 2, 2012, Hickox was the first base umpire when Jered Weaver no-hit the Minnesota Twins.

Hickox was behind the plate on August 24, 2012, when Adrián Beltré of the Texas Rangers hit for the cycle against the Twins.

He was the plate umpire on September 28, 2012, when Homer Bailey of the Cincinnati Reds no-hit the Pittsburgh Pirates.

Hickox was the plate umpire when Alex Rodriguez of the Yankees hit a home run for his 3,000th hit on June 19, 2015. He was also the plate umpire for Alex Rodriguez's first MLB baseball hit at Fenway Park on July 9, 1994.

== Personal life ==
In the off-season, Hickox, a sworn police officer who received a 2004 degree in Criminal justice from Seminole Community College, lives and works in Florida as a part time detective with the Daytona Beach Shores Police Department. He is also a licensed real estate agent.

Hickox, who is also a licensed pilot, volunteers for Angel Flight during the off-season, and has been volunteering since 2009. After a flight in October 2018, Hickox told the Daytona Beach News-Journal that he tries "to do at least one [mission] every off-season."

== Minor league umpiring career ==
- Gulf Coast League (1983)
- Florida State League (1983–85, 2004)
- Southern League (1986–87)
- Dominican Winter League (1988)
- International League (1988–1997)
- Puerto Rican Winter League (1989)
- Pacific Coast League (1998)
- New York–Penn League (2002)
- South Atlantic League (2003)

== See also ==
- List of Major League Baseball umpires (disambiguation)
