= List of Toros de Tijuana managers =

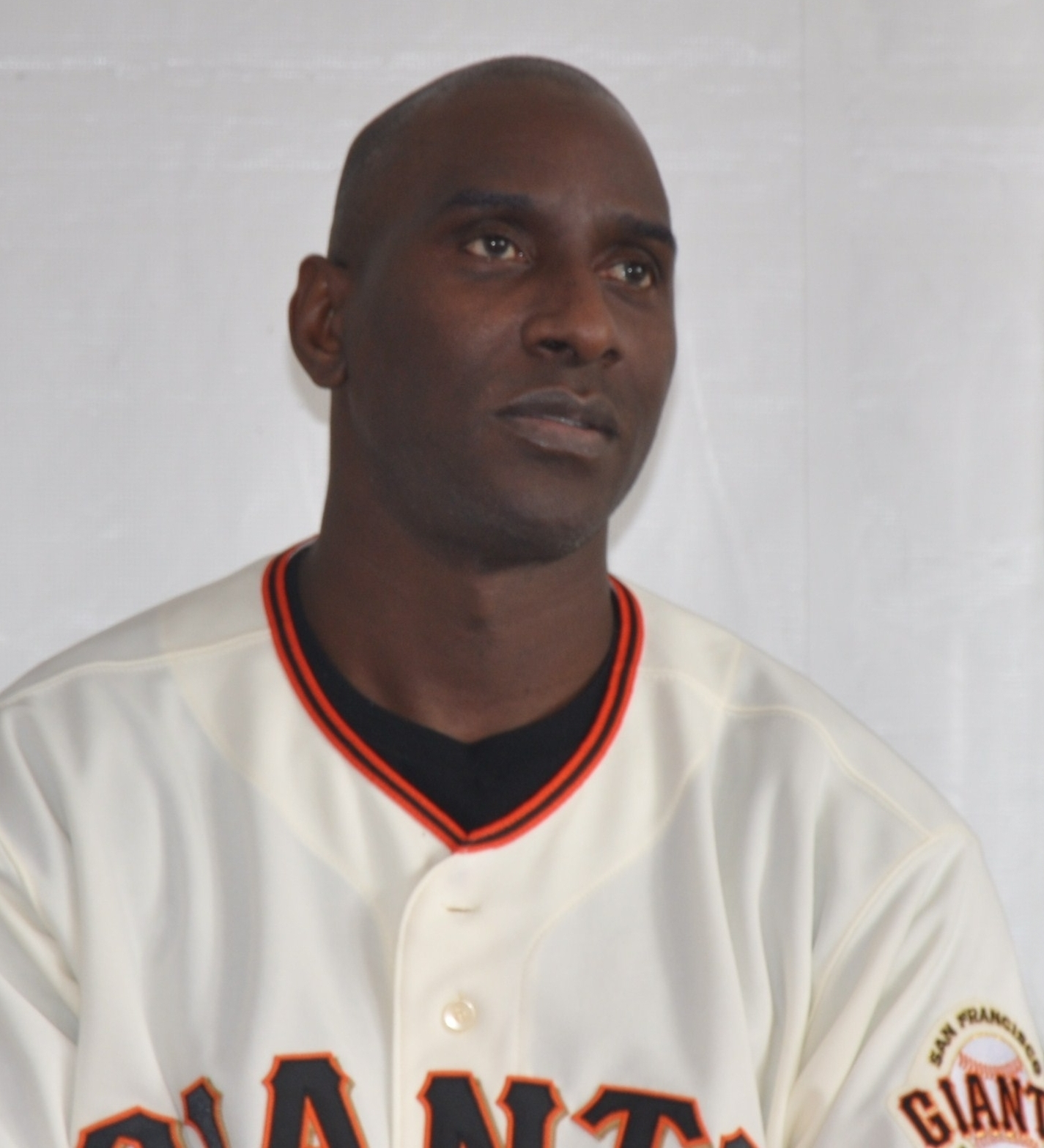
Roberto Kelly, hired in October 2025, is the current manager of the Toros de Tijuana.

The Toros de Tijuana are a professional baseball team based in Tijuana, Baja California, competing in the Mexican Baseball League (LMB). Established in 2014, the franchise has employed 15 managers. The duties of the team manager include team strategy and leadership on and off the field.

Mario Mendoza was the franchise's first manager in 2014. He was dismissed on 30 April, and Jesús Sommers, the team's hitting coach, was promoted to interim manager. Matías Carrillo was appointed manager on 19 May, but after compiling a 12–13 record, he was sacked and replaced by Sommers.

Eddie Díaz was appointed manager ahead of the 2015 season. He was fired after a 26–31 start and was replaced by Juan Gabriel Castro on 16 June. Luis Sojo managed the club for the first half of the 2016 season and was replaced by Pedro Meré on 4 July. Meré led the Toros until the first tournament of the 2018 season (Note: The 2018 season was contested in a two-tournament format known as Spring and Autumn..), during which the team won the North Zone title in 2016 and 2017 and the 2017 Serie del Rey, the first league championship in franchise history.

Meré was dismissed after the 2018 Spring tournament and was replaced by Lino Rivera ahead of the 2018 Autumn tournament. On 6 August, Rivera was succeeded by Óscar Robles. Robles piloted the team for the remainder of 2018 and the entire 2019 season; he was fired on 10 October 2019.

Omar Vizquel was signed as the team's manager on 2 December 2019. However, the 2020 season was cancelled due to the COVID-19 pandemic, and he did not manage a game that year. In 2021, Vizquel led Tijuana to a 34–22 record but was dismissed on 25 July with nine games remaining in the season. Homar Rojas replaced Vizquel and guided the team to its second LMB championship, winning the 2021 Serie del Rey.

Rojas skippered the Toros again in 2022 and for most of the 2023 season, before being replaced by Luis Matos, who managed the team for the final three games of the season and the playoffs. Three managers led the club in 2024: Luis Carlos Rivera began the season, Dan Firova replaced him on 21 May, and Carlos Gastélum succeeded Firova on 26 July. Óscar Robles returned in 2025 for his second tenure as manager of the Toros, leading the team to a 54–38 finish, losing in the first round of the playoffs to the Algodoneros de Unión Laguna; he was fired on 26 September.

The current manager of the Toros is Roberto Kelly, who was hired in October 2025, ahead of the 2026 season.

== Key ==
| No. | Number of managers (Note: A running count of the total number of managers of the Toros; any person who returned as manager is counted only once.) |
| G | Games managed (includes ties) |
| W | Wins |
| L | Losses |
| Win % | Winning percentage (Note: Winning percentages in baseball are computed using only wins and losses; ties are excluded.) |
| * | Inducted to the Mexican Professional Baseball Hall of Fame |
| ^{(i)} | Interim manager |

== Managers ==
Statistics updated through the 2025 season.

| No. | Nat. | Name | Seasons | Regular season | | | | Postseason | | | Achievements | Ref. |
| No. | Nat. | Name | Seasons | G | W | L | Win % | G | W | L | Achievements | Ref. |
|---|---|---|---|---|---|---|---|---|---|---|---|---|
| 1 | (Mexico) | Mario Mendoza | 2014 | 24 | 8 | 16 | .333 | – | – | – | – | |
| 2 | (Mexico) | Jesús Sommers^{(i)} | 2014 | 17 | 10 | 7 | .588 | – | – | – | – | |
| 3 | (Mexico) | Matías Carrillo | 2014 | 25 | 12 | 13 | .480 | – | – | – | – | |
| 2 | (Mexico) | Jesús Sommers | 2014 | 47 | 25 | 22 | .672 | — | — | — | — | |
| 4 | (Dominican Republic) | Eddie Díaz | 2015 | 57 | 26 | 31 | .456 | — | — | — | — | |
| 5 | (Mexico) | Juan Gabriel Castro | 2015 | 50 | 28 | 22 | .560 | 15 | 8 | 7 | — | |
| 6 | (Venezuela) | Luis Sojo | 2016 | 77 | 40 | 37 | .519 | — | — | — | — | |
| 7 | (Mexico) | Pedro Meré | 2016–2018 | 200 | 132 | 68 | .660 | 44 | 28 | 16 | 1 Serie del Rey championship (2017); 2 North Zone championships (2016, 2017) | |
| 8 | (Dominican Republic) | Lino Rivera | 2018 | 29 | 17 | 12 | .586 | — | — | — | — | |
| 9 | (Mexico) | Óscar Robles | 2018–2019 | 147 | 93 | 54 | .633 | 20 | 10 | 10 | — | |
| 10 | (Venezuela) | Omar Vizquel | 2021 | 56 | 34 | 22 | .607 | — | — | — | — | |
| 11 | (Mexico) | Homar Rojas | 2021–2023 | 186 | 116 | 70 | .624 | 31 | 20 | 11 | 1 Serie del Rey championship (2021); 1 North Zone championship (2021) | |
| 12 | (Puerto Rico) | Luis Matos | 2023 | 3 | 2 | 1 | .667 | 10 | 5 | 5 | – | |
| 13 | (Mexico) | Luis Carlos Rivera | 2024 | 34 | 19 | 15 | .559 | – | – | – | – | |
| 14 | (United States) | Dan Firova | 2024 | 52 | 27 | 25 | .519 | – | – | – | – | |
| 15 | (Mexico) | Carlos Gastélum | 2024 | 6 | 6 | 0 | 1.000 | 5 | 1 | 4 | – | |
| 9 | (Mexico) | Óscar Robles | 2025 | 92 | 54 | 38 | .587 | 6 | 2 | 4 | — | |
| Totals | 15 managers | | 11 seasons | 1102 | 649 | 453 | .589 | 131 | 74 | 57 | | |

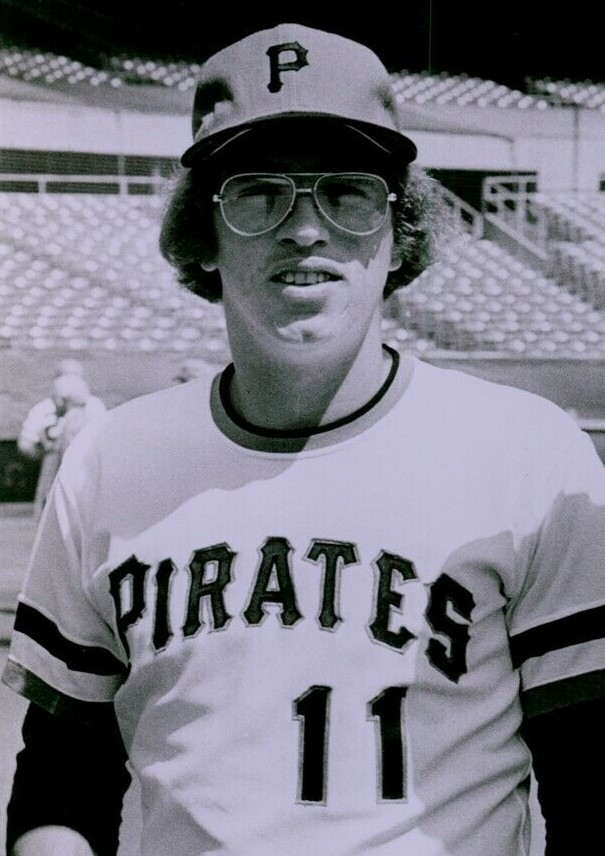
Mario Mendoza was the first manager in franchise history in 2014.

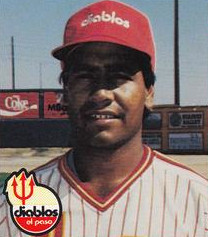
Matías Carrillo managed the team in 2014 for 25 games.

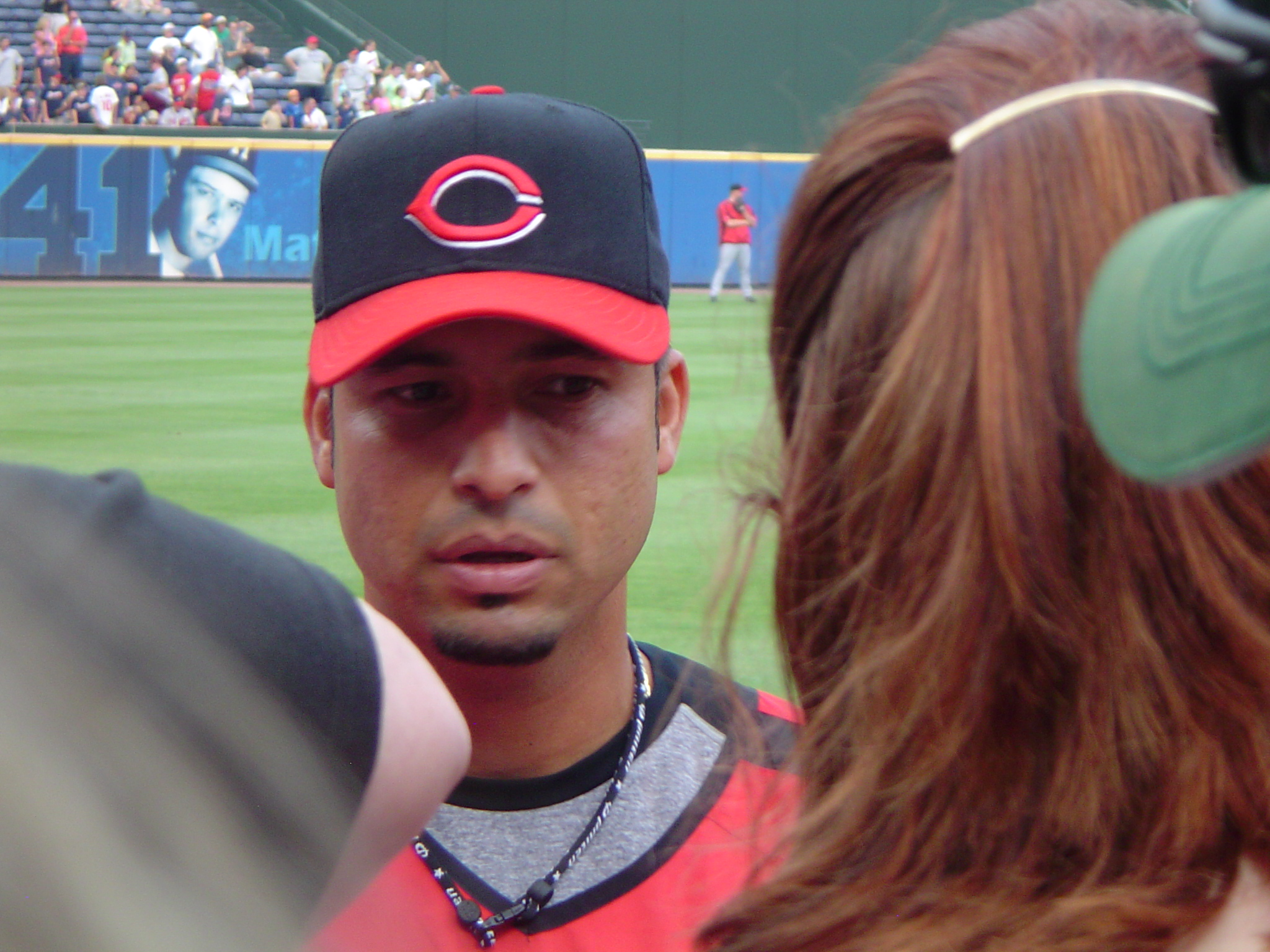
Juan Gabriel Castro managed the team for the second part of the 2015 season, leading the Toros to the playoffs for the first time in their history.

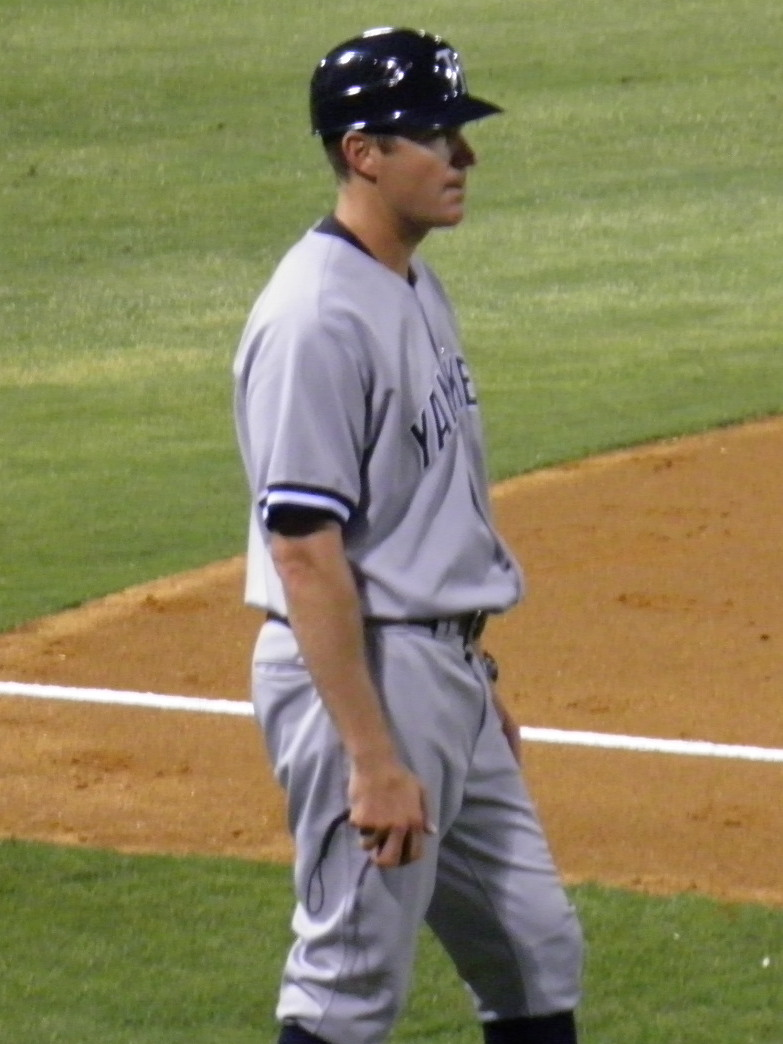
Luis Sojo managed the team during the first half of the 2016 season.

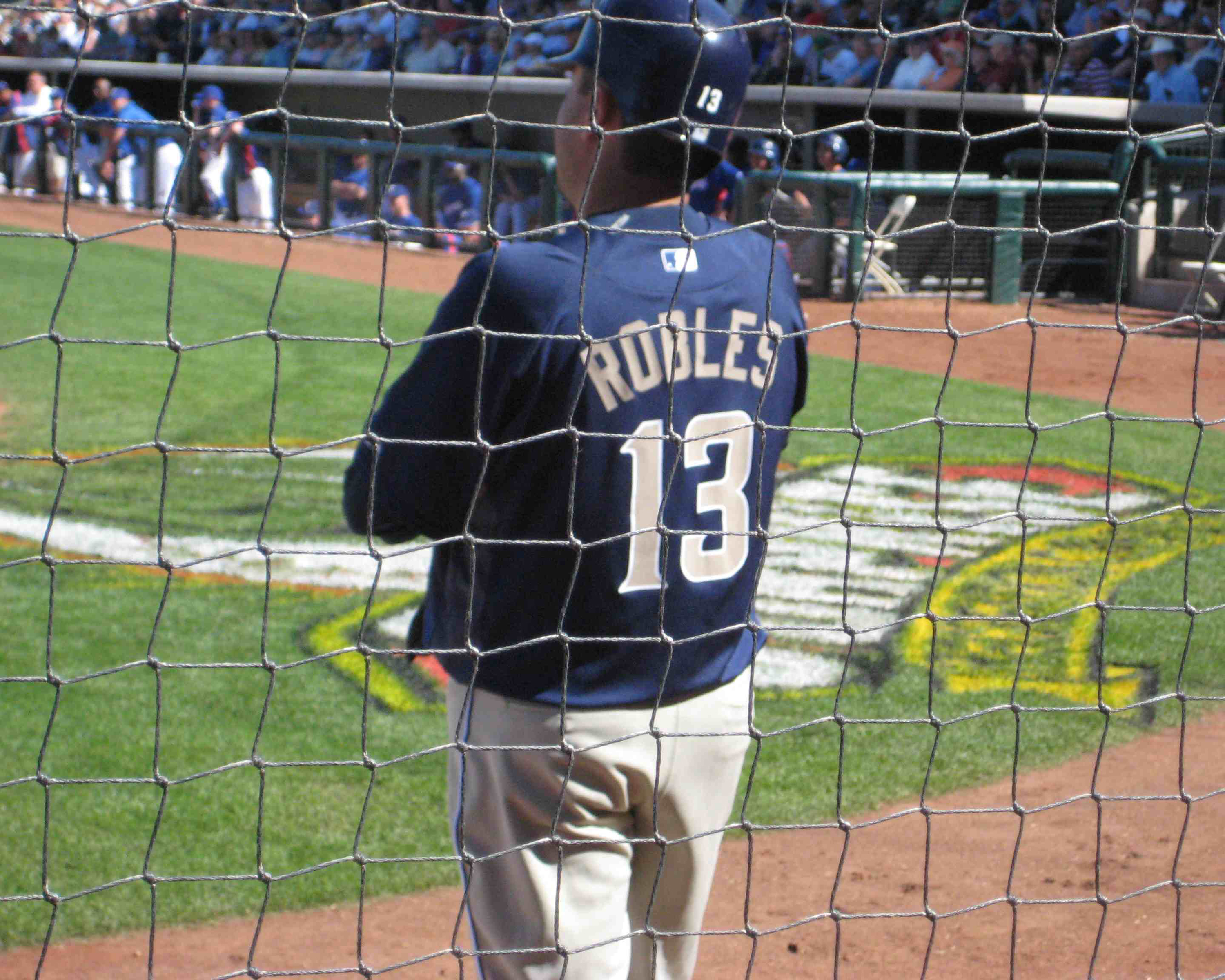
Óscar Robles has led the Toros in two separate stints: from 2018 to 2019 and in 2025.

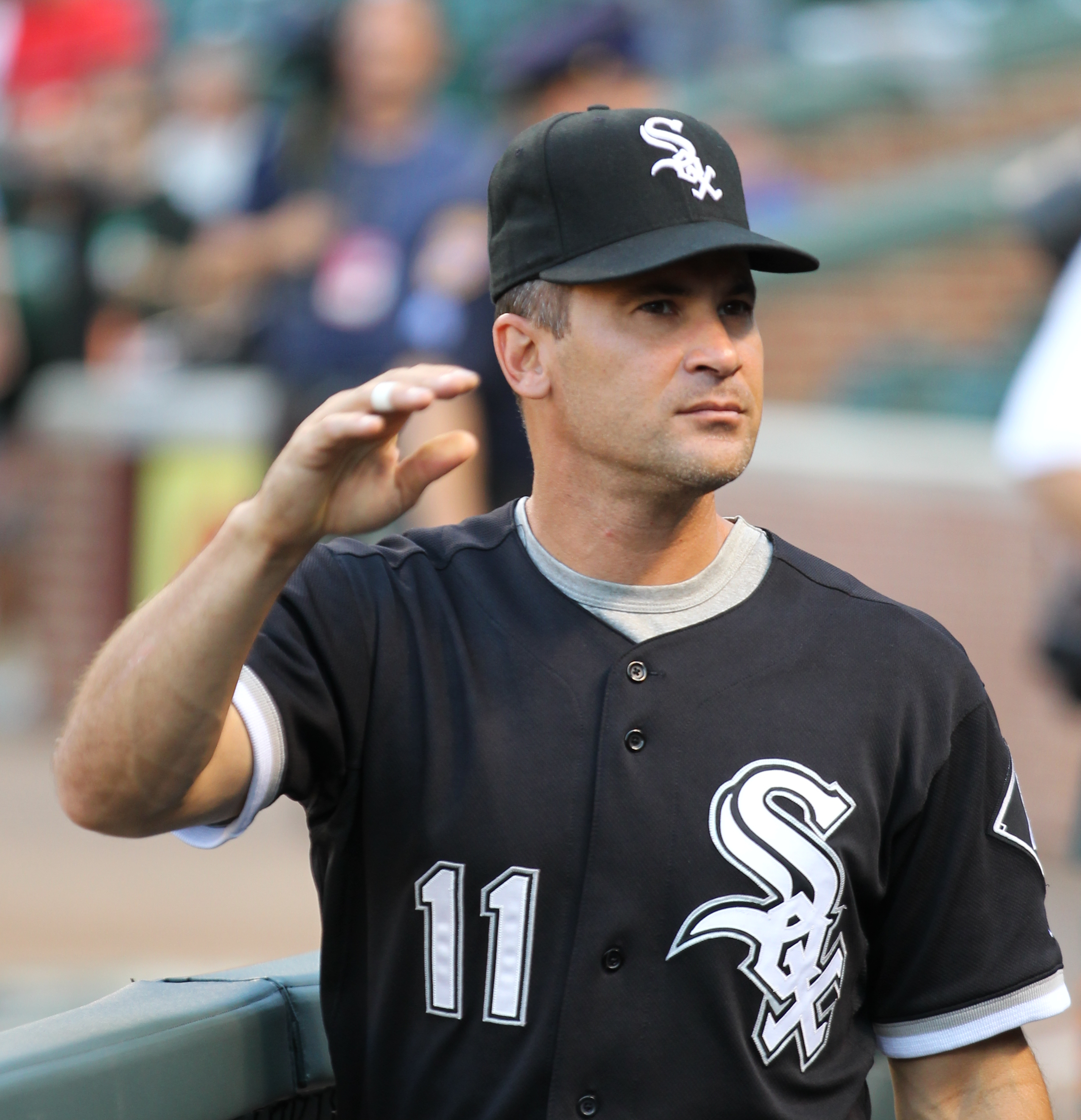
Omar Vizquel managed the team for most of the 2021 season and was dismissed with nine games remaining.

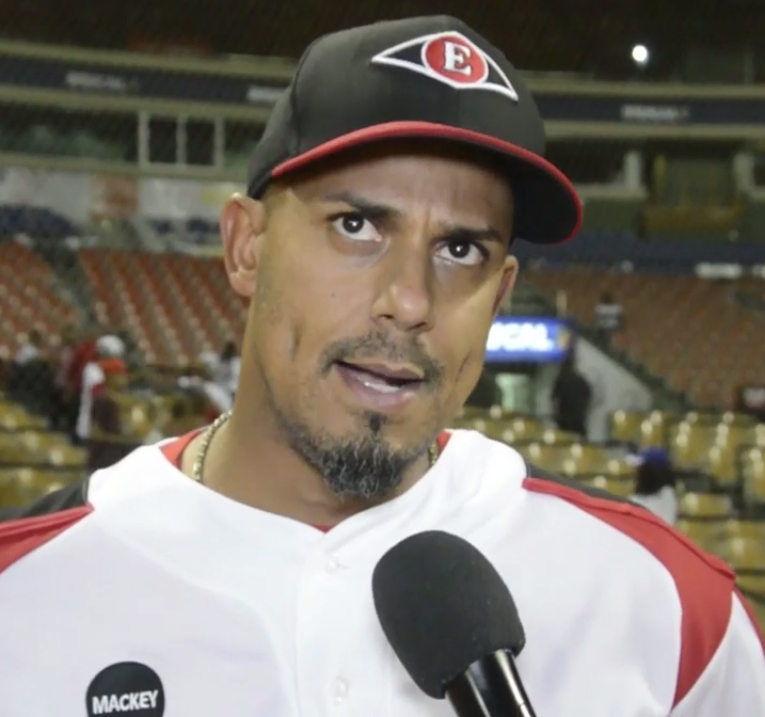
Luis Matos led the team for the last part of the 2023 season.
