= 2017 Mexican Baseball League season =

2017 Mexican League season
- League: Mexican League
- Sport: Baseball
- Duration: 31 March – 10 September
- Teams: 16

Serie del Rey
- Champions: Toros de Tijuana
- Runners-up: Pericos de Puebla
- Finals MVP: Roberto López

LMB seasons
- ← 2016 2018 →

The 2017 Mexican Baseball League season was the 93rd season in the history of the Mexican League. It was contested by 16 teams, evenly divided in North and South zones. The season started on 31 March and ended on 10 September.

There were two team changes. Delfines del Carmen moved to Durango, under the same administration, but became a new team and changed their name to Generales de Durango; this marked the return of professional baseball to Durango since 1979, when the Alacranes de Durango last played there. The Broncos de Reynosa moved to León, Guanajuato to bring back the Bravos de León, that last played in the Mexican League in 1991.

The Toros de Tijuana won their first Mexican League championship under manager Pedro Meré, defeating the Pericos de Puebla 4 games to 1 in the Serie del Rey. Tijuana's outfielder Roberto López was named the championship series Most Valuable Player.

== Teams ==
Team	City	Stadium	Capacity	Manager
North Zone
Acereros de Monclova	Monclova, Coahuila	Estadio Monclova	8,500	(United States) Wally Backman
Diablos Rojos del México	Mexico City	Estadio Fray Nano	5,000	(Mexico) Miguel Ojeda
Generales de Durango	Durango, Durango	Estadio Francisco Villa	4,983	(Cuba) Joe Álvarez
Rieleros de Aguascalientes	Aguascalientes, Aguascalientes	Parque Alberto Romo Chávez	6,494	(Mexico) Homar Rojas
Saraperos de Saltillo	Saltillo, Coahuila	Estadio Francisco I. Madero	16,000	(Puerto Rico) Orlando Sánchez
Sultanes de Monterrey	Monterrey, Nuevo León	Estadio de Beisbol Monterrey	22,061	(Dominican Republic) Félix Fermín
Toros de Tijuana	Tijuana, Baja California	Estadio Gasmart	17,000	(Mexico) Pedro Meré
Vaqueros de Unión Laguna	Torreón, Coahuila	Estadio de la Revolución	9,500	(Mexico) Ramón Orantes
South Zone
Bravos de León	León, Guanajuato	Estadio Domingo Santana	6,500	(Mexico) Francisco Estrada
Guerreros de Oaxaca	Oaxaca City, Oaxaca	Estadio Lic. Eduardo Vasconcelos	7,200	(Mexico) Houston Jiménez
Leones de Yucatán	Mérida, Yucatán	Parque Kukulcán	14,917	(Venezuela) Willie Romero
Olmecas de Tabasco	Villahermosa, Tabasco	Estadio Centenario del 27 de Febrero	8,500	(Mexico) Enrique Reyes
Pericos de Puebla	Puebla, Puebla	Estadio Hermanos Serdán	12,112	(United States) Von Hayes
Piratas de Campeche	Campeche, Campeche	Estadio Nelson Barrera	6,000	(Puerto Rico) Lino Rivera
Rojos del Águila de Veracruz	Veracruz, Veracruz	Estadio Universitario Beto Ávila	7,782	(Puerto Rico) Eddie Castro
Tigres de Quintana Roo	Cancún, Quintana Roo	Estadio Beto Ávila	9,500	(Mexico) Roberto Vizcarra

Location of the 2017 Mexican Baseball League season teams

== Standings ==
North Zone
Rank	Team	G	W	L	Pct.	GB
1	Toros de Tijuana	110	76	34	.691	–
2	Sultanes de Monterrey	109	68	41	.624	7.5
3	Acereros de Monclova	108	67	41	.620	8.0
4	Rieleros de Aguascalientes	110	64	46	.582	12.0
5	Vaqueros de Unión Laguna	109	60	49	.550	15.5
6	Diablos Rojos del México	109	57	52	.523	18.5
7	Saraperos de Saltillo	108	44	64	.407	31.0
8	Generales de Durango	109	43	66	.394	32.5

South Zone
Rank	Team	G	W	L	Pct.	GB
1	Leones de Yucatán	105	63	42	.600	—
2	Pericos de Puebla	110	56	54	.509	9.5
3	Tigres de Quintana Roo	105	49	56	.467	14.0
4	Rojos del Águila de Veracruz	105	48	57	.457	15.0
5	Bravos de León	105	45	60	.429	18.0
6	Piratas de Campeche	106	43	63	.406	20.5
7	Guerreros de Oaxaca	107	40	67	.374	24.0
8	Olmecas de Tabasco	107	38	69	.355	26.0

== Postseason ==
Wild card
Veracruz	0
León	1

First round
Tijuana	4
Aguascalientes	2
Monterrey	4
Monclova	0
Yucatán	4
León	0
Puebla	4
Tigres	0

Championship Series
Tijuana	4
Monterrey	2
Yucatán	1
Puebla	4

Serie del Rey
Tijuana	4
Puebla	1

== Managerial changes ==
=== Off season ===
Team	Former manager	Reason for leaving	New manager	Ref.
Acereros de Monclova	(Mexico) Homar Rojas	Fired	(United States) Wally Backman	
Diablos Rojos del México	(Mexico) José Luis Sandoval	Reassigned	(Mexico) Miguel Ojeda	
Pericos de Puebla	(United States) Cory Snyder	Resigned	(United States) Von Hayes	
Rieleros de Aguascalientes	(Mexico) Saúl Soto	Reassigned	(Mexico) Homar Rojas	
Saraperos de Saltillo	(Mexico) Francisco Estrada	Resigned	(Puerto Rico) Orlando Sánchez	
Vaqueros de Unión Laguna	(Mexico) Daniel Fernández	Fired	(Mexico) Ramón Orantes	

=== In season ===
Team	Former manager	Interim manager	Reason for leaving	New manager	Ref.
Acereros de Monclova	(United States) Wally Backman	N/A	Fired	(Mexico) Jorge Loredo	
Bravos de León	(Mexico) Francisco Estrada	N/A	Fired	(Mexico) Luis Carlos Rivera	
Leones de Yucatán	(Venezuela) Willie Romero	(Mexico) Oswaldo Morejón	Fired	(Mexico) Juan Francisco Rodríguez	
Olmecas de Tabasco	(Mexico) Enrique Reyes	N/A	Fired	(Mexico) Marco Antonio Guzmán	
Olmecas de Tabasco	(Mexico) Marco Antonio Guzmán	N/A	Fired	(Mexico) Vicente Palacios	
Pericos de Puebla	(United States) Von Hayes	(Mexico) Martín Arzate	Fired	(United States) Tim Johnson	
Piratas de Campeche	(Puerto Rico) Lino Rivera	N/A	Resigned	(Venezuela) Lino Connell	
Saraperos de Saltillo	(Puerto Rico) Orlando Sánchez	(Mexico) Fernando Elizondo	Fired	(Mexico) Marco Antonio Romero	
Tigres de Quintana Roo	(Mexico) Roberto Vizcarra	N/A	Fired	(Mexico) Héctor Hurtado	

== League leaders ==
Batting leaders
Stat	Player	Team	Total
AVG	(Cuba) Yadir Drake	Durango	.385
RBI	(Mexico) Ricky Álvarez	Yucatán	105
HR	(Dominican Republic) Rainel Rosario	Saltillo	26
H	(Dominican Republic) Zoilo Almonte	Monterrey	157
R	(Mexico) Ramón Urías	México	106
SB	(United States) Justin Greene	Monclova	51

Pitching leaders
Stat	Player	Team	Total
W	(Mexico) Octavio Acosta	México	14
ERA	(Venezuela) Néstor Molina	Veracruz	1.89
K	(United States) Josh Lowey	Monclova	146
IP	(Venezuela) Néstor Molina	Veracruz	152.2
SV	(United States) Chad Gaudin	Monclova	29

== Milestones ==
=== Pitchers ===
==== No-hitters ====
- Manny Barreda (TIJ): On 16 July, Barreda threw a no-hitter against the Olmecas de Tabasco, the first in the team's history.

== Awards ==
=== Mexican League Awards ===
The following individuals received awards at the end of the season.

Award	Player	Team	Ref.
Most Valuable Player	(Mexico) Jesse Castillo	Rieleros de Aguascalientes	
Manager of the Year	(Mexico) Homar Rojas	Rieleros de Aguascalientes	
Pitcher of the Year	(Venezuela) Néstor Molina	Rojos del Águila de Veracruz	
Reliever of the Year	(United States) Chad Gaudin	Acereros de Monclova	
Rookie of the Year	(Mexico) Luis Márquez	Rojos del Águila de Veracruz	

=== Golden Glove Awards ===
The following players won Golden Glove Awards.

Position	Player	Team
Pitcher	(United States) Josh Lowey	Acereros de Monclova
Catcher	(Mexico) Erick Rodríguez	Guerreros de Oaxaca
First base	(Cuba) José Julio Ruiz	Saraperos de Saltillo
Second base	(Mexico) Carlos Gastélum	Tigres de Quintana Roo
Third base	(Mexico) Christian Zazueta	Saraperos de Saltillo
Shortstop	(Mexico) Alejandro Rivero	Rojos del Águila de Veracruz
Left field	(United States) Cyle Hankerd	Toros de Tijuana
Center field	(Mexico) Eliezer Ortiz	Rieleros de Aguascalientes
Right field	(Mexico) Leo Germán	Sultanes de Monterrey
