= Mexican Baseball League Manager of the Year Award =

The Mexican League Manager of the Year Award is presented annually since 2005 to the most outstanding manager in the baseball Mexican Baseball League, as selected by a vote of members of the press.

== Winners ==
=== Key ===
†	Member of the Mexican Professional Baseball Hall of Fame
(#)	Number of wins by managers who have won the award multiple times
**Bold**	The manager's team won the Serie del Rey in the same season

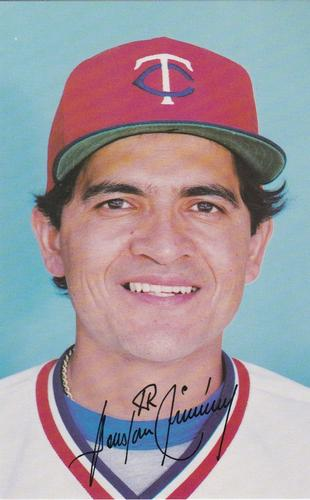
Houston Jiménez won the award back to back in 2009 and 2010

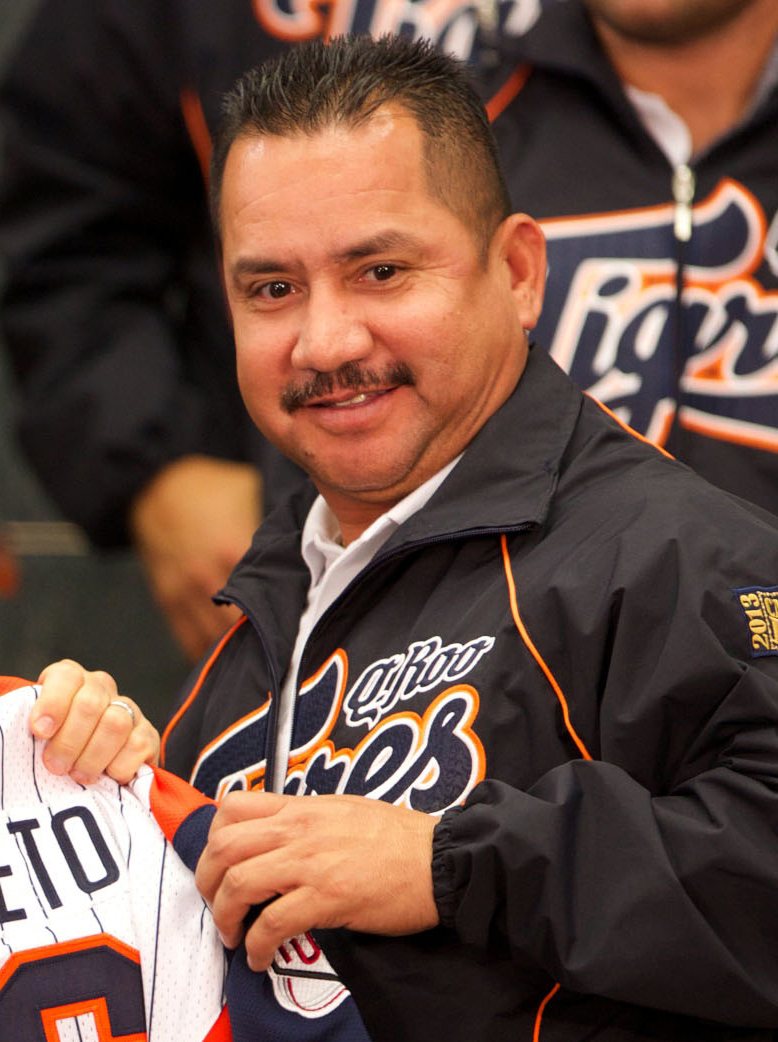
Roberto Vizcarra, 2019 and 2022 winner

Year	Manager	Team	Zone	Finish	Record	Ref.
2005	(Mexico) Enrique Reyes	**Tigres de la Angelópolis**	South	1st	41–15	
2006	(Mexico) Homar Rojas	Guerreros de Oaxaca	South	2nd	63–44	
2007	(Puerto Rico) Lino Rivera	Leones de Yucatán	South	3rd	61–49	
2008	(Mexico) Daniel Fernández^{†}	**Diablos Rojos del México**	South	1st	66–39	
2009	(Mexico) Houston Jiménez^{†}	Pericos de Puebla	South	3rd	62–43	
2010	(Mexico) Houston Jiménez (2)^{†}	Pericos de Puebla	South	1st	66–39	
2011	(Mexico) Matías Carrillo^{†}	**Tigres de Quintana Roo**	South	1st	62–43	
2012	(Mexico) Enrique Reyes (2)	Rieleros de Aguascalientes	North	2nd	59–49	
2013	(Dominican Republic) Félix Fermín	Delfines del Carmen	South	1st	63–46	
2014	(Mexico) Miguel Ojeda	**Diablos Rojos del México**	North	1st	70–42	
2015	(Venezuela) Willie Romero	Leones de Yucatán	South	1st	66–46	
2016	(Venezuela) Willie Romero	Leones de Yucatán	South	1st	77–33	
2017	(Mexico) Homar Rojas (2)	Rieleros de Aguascalientes	North	4th	64–46	
2018^{[a]}	(Panama) Roberto Kelly	**Sultanes de Monterrey**	North	N/A	71–43	
2019	(Mexico) Roberto Vizcarra^{†}	Saraperos de Saltillo	North	4th	66–53	
2020	Not awarded. Season canceled due to the COVID-19 pandemic					
2021	(Mexico) Benji Gil	Mariachis de Guadalajara	North	1st	46–17	
2022	(Mexico) Roberto Vizcarra (2)^{†}	**Leones de Yucatán**	South	4th	46–43	
2023	(Dominican Republic) Félix Fermín (2)	Tecolotes de los Dos Laredos	North	1st	50–36	
2024	(Dominican Republic) José Offerman	Conspiradores de Querétaro	South	2nd	50–38	
2025	(United States) Daren Brown	Piratas de Campeche	South	3rd	47–43	
2026	(Mexico) Luis Carlos Rivera	Olmecas de Tabasco	South	2nd	54–38	

== Multiple-time winners ==
Manager	# of Awards	Years
(Mexico) Houston Jiménez^{†}	2	2009, 2010
(Mexico) Enrique Reyes	2	2005, 2012
(Mexico) Homar Rojas	2	2006, 2017
(Mexico) Roberto Vizcarra^{†}	2	2019, 2022
(Dominican Republic) Félix Fermín	2	2013, 2023

== Notes ==
- ^{a} The 2018 season was contested in a two-tournament format known as Spring and Autumn. The Sultanes won the Autumn tournament. The record presented reflects the whole season.
