= Roberto Vizcarra =

Mexican baseball player and manager (born 1967)

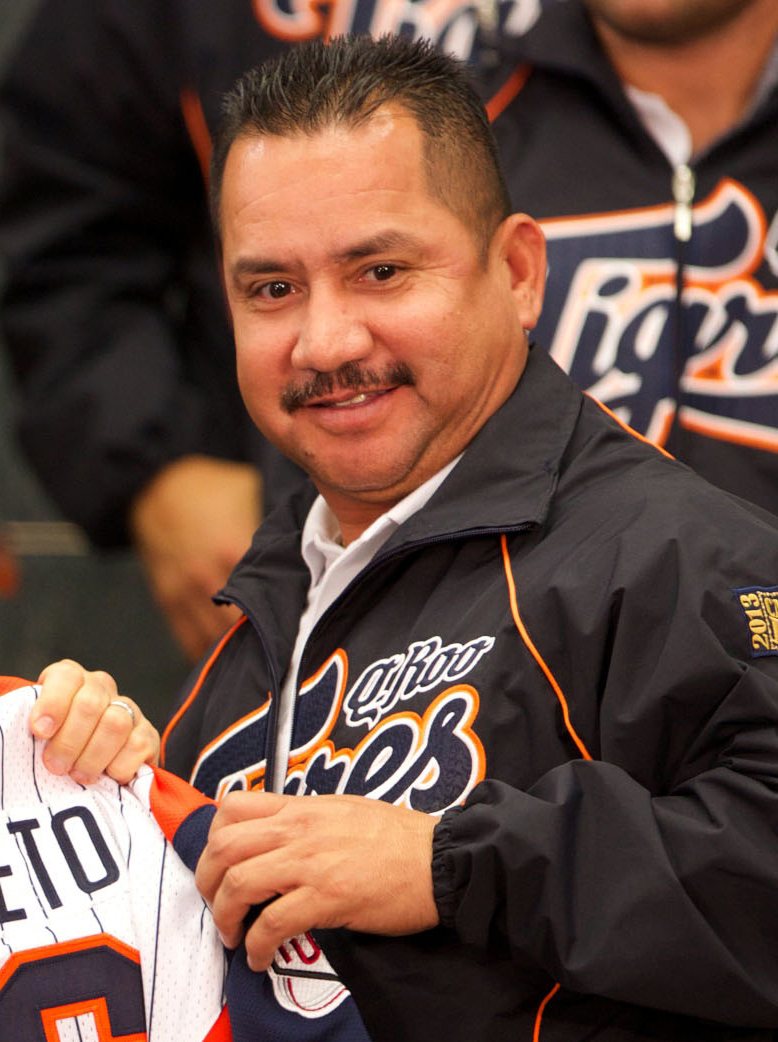
- Vizcarra in 2013

Conspiradores de Querétaro
- Infielder / Manager
- Born: 26 May 1967 (age 59); San Luis Río Colorado, Sonora, Mexico
- Bats: Right Throws: Right

Career highlights and awards
- 2× Mexican League Manager of the Year (2019, 2022)

Member of the Mexican Professional

Baseball Hall of Fame
- Induction: 2023

Roberto Eduardo Vizcarra Acosta (born 26 May 1967), nicknamed "Chapo", is a Mexican former professional baseball infielder who is the current manager for the Conspiradores de Querétaro of the Mexican League. He made his professional debut in 1986 and played 23 seasons in the Mexican League and 17 seasons in the Mexican Pacific League (LMP). He retired in 2008 and started his career as manager in 2013 with the Tigres de Quintana Roo. Vizcarra won four Mexican League titles as player and has won seven titles as manager (four in the LMB and three in the LMP), making him the winningest manager in Mexican baseball in recent years.

== Professional career ==
=== Mexican League ===
Vizcarra was born on 26 May 1967 in San Luis Río Colorado, Sonora. He made his professional debut in the Mexican League (LMB) in 1986 with the Bravos de León as second baseman, the position he would play for most of his career. In 1988, Vizcarra became a starter for the Bravos and later won the 1990 Serie del Rey with León. In 1992, he signed with the Industriales de Monterrey. During the 1994 season, he was traded to the Rieleros de Aguascalientes, where he spent the rest of the season and played until 1999, where he, again, was traded during the season to the Tigres Capitalinos. Vizcarra was part of the Tigres team that won back to back LMB titles in 2000 and 2001. In 2004, he signed with the Piratas de Campeche and won the Mexican League title that same year. Vizcarra last played for the Piratas in 2008 and retired at the end of the season.

=== Mexican Pacific League ===
Vizcarra played 17 seasons in the Mexican Pacific League (LMP). He debuted in 1987 with the Yaquis de Obregón, where he spent the next 12 seasons. In the 1999–00 season, he played for the Tomateros de Culiacán and the Venados de Mazatlán. In 2000, he was signed by the Águilas de Mexicali and in 2001 he returned to the Tomateros and played there until the 2002–03 season. In 2003–04, Vizcarra played his last LMP season with Mexicali.

Vizcarra held the Mexican Pacific League record for single season doubles, with 27 achieved in the 1991–92 season, until 2008, when the record was beaten by Agustín Murillo with 28 doubles.

== Managerial career ==
=== Mexican League ===
On 23 July 2013, Vizcarra was hired by the Tigres de Quintana Roo as the club's manager, replacing Matías Carrillo. He won the 2013 and 2015 Mexican League championships with the Tigres. He left the team in July 2017 and was replaced by Héctor Hurtado. In February 2018, Vizcarra was signed by the Leones de Yucatán as their new manager. Vizcarra led the Leones to the 2018 Mexican League championship, but left the team in November 2018. Vizcarra was appointed manager of the Saraperos de Saltillo for the 2019 Mexican League season, winning the Mexican League Manager of the Year award in his first season leading the Saraperos. Vizcarra was sacked on 29 May 2022. He returned as manager of the Leones de Yucatán the next day, replacing Luis Matos and led the Leones to the 2022 Mexican League championship, winning the 2022 Mexican League Manager of the Year Award.

In February 2023, Vizcarra was inducted into the Mexican Professional Baseball Hall of Fame as part of the class of 2023.

On 22 November 2024, Vizcarra was fired by the Leones de Yucatán. He was replaced by Ramón Santiago.

On 6 July 2025, Vizcarra was named as the manager for the Guerreros de Oaxaca of the Mexican League following the firing of Luis Rivera. On 23 July 2026, Vizcarra was fired by Oaxaca.

On 29 August 2026, Vizcarra was named as manager for the Conspiradores de Querétaro of the Mexican League for the upcoming 2027 season.

=== Mexican Pacific League ===
Vizcarra led the Águilas de Mexicali to win the 2016–17 Mexican Pacific League season, qualifying to the 2017 Caribbean Series, where the Águilas finished second after losing the final against the Criollos de Caguas. Vizcarra also won the 2019 and 2022 Mexican Pacific League championships with the Charros de Jalisco.

== Managerial statistics ==
=== Mexican League ===
Year	Team	Regular season						Postseason			
Year	Team	Games	Won	Lost	Tied	Pct.	Finish	Won	Lost	Pct.	Notes
2013	Tigres de Quintana Roo	12	7	5	0	.583	3rd in South	11	3	.786	Won Serie del Rey (Monterrey)
2014	Tigres de Quintana Roo	113	65	48	0	.575	1st in South	6	5	.545	Lost Championship Series (Puebla)
2015	Tigres de Quintana Roo	66	42	24	0	.636	2nd in South	12	7	.632	Won Serie del Rey (Monclova)
2016	Tigres de Quintana Roo	113	68	45	0	.602	3rd in South	0	4	.000	Lost First round (Puebla)
2017	Tigres de Quintana Roo	86	37	49	0	.430	–	–	–	–	–
2018	Leones de Yucatán	57	40	17	0	.702	1st in South	12	7	.632	Won Serie del Rey (Monterrey)
2018	Leones de Yucatán	56	32	24	0	.571	1st in South	3	4	.429	Lost First round (Oaxaca)
2019	Saraperos de Saltillo	119	66	53	0	.555	4th in North	2	4	.333	Lost First round (Tijuana)
2021	Saraperos de Saltillo	66	36	30	0	.545	3rd in North	1	4	.200	Lost First round (Monclova)
2022	Saraperos de Saltillo	32	14	18	0	.438	–	–	–	–	–
2022	Leones de Yucatán	50	28	22	0	.560	4th in South	16	9	.640	Won Serie del Rey (Monterrey)
2023	Leones de Yucatán	90	47	43	0	.522	5th in South	9	6	.600	Lost Championship Series (Puebla)
2024	Leones de Yucatán	86	45	40	0	.529	3rd in South	3	7	.300	Lost Zone Series (México)
2025	Guerreros de Oaxaca	28	21	7	0	.750	2nd in South	7	4	.636	Lost Zone Series (Campeche)
2026	Guerreros de Oaxaca	80	41	39	0	.513	–	–	–	–	–
Total		1,054	589	464	0	.559		82	64	.562	
