= Jesús Sommers =

Mexican baseball player and manager (1949–2026)

- Infielder / Designated hitter / Manager
- Born: 11 November 1949; Guaymas, Sonora, Mexico
- Died: 21 February 2026 (aged 76); Culiacán, Sinaloa, Mexico
- Batted: Right Threw: Right

Career highlights and awards
- Tomateros de Culiacán #18 retired; Mexican Baseball League records: 3,004 career hits

Member of the Mexican Professional

Baseball Hall of Fame
- Induction: 2002

Jesús Martín Sommers López (11 November 1949 – 21 February 2026) was a Mexican professional baseball infielder and manager. Sommers played 27 seasons in the Mexican Baseball League (LMB), debuting in 1970, and still holds the league's career record for hits with 3,004, earning him the nickname "Rey del Hit" (King of Hits). He also played 25 seasons in the Mexican Pacific League (LMP).

As manager, he debuted in 1996 with the Petroleros de Poza Rica and last managed the Piratas de Campeche in 2019.

== Early life ==
Sommers was born on 11 November 1949 in Guaymas, Sonora to American baseball player Lonnie Summers (Note: Lonnie Summers was known as “Sommers” in Mexico, and his son Jesús inherited Sommers as his legal surname.) and Armida López; at the time, his father was playing for the Diablos Rojos del México of the Mexican Baseball League. He grew up in Tijuana, where he started playing baseball in amateur leagues.

== Playing career ==
=== Early career ===
Sommers made his professional debut in 1966, aged 16, with the Rojos de San Luis in the Mexican Central League. In 1968 and 1969, he played for the Bravos de Ciudad Madero of the Central League; in 1969, he also played for the Tiburones de Puerto Peñasco of the Mexican Northern League.

=== Mexican Baseball League ===
Sommers made his Mexican Baseball League (LMB) debut in 1970, playing for the Leones de Yucatán. He recorded his first hit on 18 March 1970 in Yucatán's 4–1 victory over El Águila de Veracruz. After playing four seasons for the Leones, in 1974 he was signed by the Ángeles Negros de Puebla. He played for the Rieleros de Aguascalientes from 1977 to 1978, winning the 1978 LMB championship. In 1979, he joined the Alijadores de Tampico and recorded his 1,000th career hit on 27 June against the Petroleros de Poza Rica.

In 1980, Sommers played for the Osos Negros de Toluca before joining the Diablos Rojos del México, with whom he won the 1981 Mexican Baseball League championship. He spent the 1982 season with the Plataneros de Tabasco and returned to the Diablos Rojos in 1983. From 1983 to 1988, he played for the Bravos de León, recording his 2,000th career hit on 30 April 1987 against the Tigres de México.

From 1989 to 1990, Sommers played for the Algodoneros de Unión Laguna, followed by stints with the Charros de Jalisco from 1991 to 1993, and the Industriales de Monterrey in 1994. In 1995, he played for both the Pericos de Puebla and El Águila de Veracruz. He finished his playing career in 1996 with the Petroleros de Poza Rica, recording his 3,000th career hit on 17 May against Elmer Dessens of the Diablos Rojos del México.

Mexican Baseball League career statistics
Seasons	G	AB	R	H	2B	3B	HR	RBI	SB	BB	BA	SLG
27	2908	10327	1455	3004	488	67	241	1534	128	1151	.291	.421

=== Mexican Pacific League ===
Sommers also played winter league baseball in the Mexican Pacific League (LMP) for 25 seasons. He debuted with the Ostioneros de Guaymas in the 1969–70 season and later played for the Tomateros de Culiacán, Yaquis de Obregón, Algodoneros de Guasave, Potros de Tijuana, Venados de Mazatlán, Cañeros de Los Mochis and Águilas de Mexicali, with whom he retired after the 1994–95 season.

He won three LMP championships: in 1978 with Culiacán, where he hit the championship-winning home run; in 1986 with Mexicali; and in 1991 with Tijuana.

Mexican Pacific League career statistics
Seasons	G	AB	R	H	2B	3B	HR	RBI	SB	BB	BA	SLG
25	1290	4509	411	1073	175	18	57	431	43	475	.238	.323

== Managerial career ==
=== Petroleros de Poza Rica ===
Sommers made his managerial debut during the 1996 Mexican Baseball League season as player-manager of the Petroleros de Poza Rica, replacing Bernardo Calvo. He repeated as manager in 1997. He returned as manager in 1997 and led the Petroleros to the playoffs in both seasons, losing in the first round to the Tigres de México each time.

=== Mayas de Chetumal ===
In 1998, Sommers managed the Mayas de Chetumal in their first and only season in the Mexican League. He was replaced midseason by Raúl Cano after posting an 18–34 record.

=== Saraperos de Saltillo ===
In 2006, Sommers joined the Saraperos de Saltillo as hitting coach, and was part of Orlando Sánchez's staff for the 2009 Mexican Baseball League championship.

=== Petroleros de Minatitlán ===
On 1 May 2010, Sommers, then serving as hitting coach for the Petroleros de Minatitlán, was promoted to manager, replacing Manuel Cazarín. The Petroleros finished last in the South Zone that season. Sommers was replaced by Víctor Mesa in January 2011.

=== Guerreros de Oaxaca ===
On 14 February 2012, Sommers was appointed as manager of the Guerreros de Oaxaca. He led the team to a 55–52 record, finishing fourth in the South Zone. The Guerreros were eliminated in the first round of the playoffs by the Tigres de Quintana Roo. Sommers left the club at the end of the season and was replaced by Héctor Estrada.

=== Petroleros de Minatitlán (second stint) ===
On 21 February 2013, Sommers was presented as the manager of the Petroleros de Minatitlán. After a 18–28 start, he was replaced by José Ángel Chávez on 1 June.

=== Toros de Tijuana ===
On 30 April 2014, Sommers was promoted from hitting coach to interim manager of the Toros de Tijuana, replacing Mario Mendoza. He posted a 10–7 record during his interim tenure and was replaced by Matías Carrillo on 19 May, remaining on the staff as bench coach. On 22 July, he was again promoted to manager after Carrillo was dismissed; he failed to qualify the Toros to the playoffs, finishing sixth in the North Zone.

=== Broncos de Reynosa ===
On 13 January 2015, Sommers was appointed manager of the Broncos de Reynosa ahead of the 2015 season. He was dismissed on 24 April after a 6–12 start and replaced by interim manager Candelario Pérez, the club's pitching coach.

=== Rieleros de Aguascalientes ===
On 17 July 2015, Sommers was named manager of the Rieleros de Aguascalientes, replacing Orlando Sánchez, who had in turn replaced Marco Davalillo. Sommers posted a 16–12 record, however, was unable to qualify the club to the playoffs, that finished sixth in the North Zone.

=== Tigres de Quintana Roo ===
On 18 January 2019, Sommers was appointed manager of the Tigres de Quintana Roo. He was dismissed on 9 May and replaced by catcher Adán Muñoz, who served as player-manager.

=== Piratas de Campeche ===
On 14 May 2019, Sommers was announced as manager of the Piratas de Campeche, replacing Tim Johnson. Sommers led the team to a 47–68 record, finishing sixth in the South Zone, failing to qualify for the playoffs. He left the team at the end of the season.

== Managerial record ==
=== Mexican Baseball League ===
Year	Team	Regular season						Postseason			
Year	Team	Games	Won	Lost	Tied	Pct.	Finish	Won	Lost	Pct.	Notes
1996	Petroleros de Poza Rica	59	37	21	1	.636	3rd	1	4	.200	Lost First round (Tigres)
1997	Petroleros de Poza Rica	119	67	52	0	.563	3rd	0	4	.000	Lost First round (Tigres)
1998	Mayas de Chetumal	52	18	34	0	.346	–	–	–	–	–
2010	Petroleros de Minatitlán	66	30	36	0	.455	8th	–	–	–	–
2012	Guerreros de Oaxaca	107	55	52	0	.514	4th	3	4	.429	Lost First round (Tigres)
2013	Petroleros de Minatitlán	46	18	28	0	.391	–	–	–	–	–
2014	Toros de Tijuana	64	35	29	0	.547	6th	–	–	–	–
2015	Broncos de Reynosa	18	6	12	0	.333	–	–	–	–	–
2015	Rieleros de Aguascalientes	28	16	12	0	.571	6th	–	–	–	–
2019	Tigres de Quintana Roo	29	11	18	0	.379	–	–	–	–	–
2019	Piratas de Campeche	82	37	45	0	.451	6th	–	–	–	–
Total		670	330	339	1	.493		4	12	.250	

== Legacy ==
Sommers was inducted into the Mexican Professional Baseball Hall of Fame as part of the class of 2002 alongside pitchers Salomé Barojas, Ernesto Escárrega, and executives Mario Hernández Maytorena, José Maiz García and Roberto Mansur.

On 14 December 2018, the Tomateros de Culiacán retired Sommers' number 18.

== Death ==
Sommers died on 21 February 2026, aged 76, in Culiacán.
