= Efrén Espinoza =

Mexican baseball player and manager (born 1979)

- Infielder / Manager / Coach
- Born: 12 September 1980 (age 46); Ciudad Obregón, Sonora, Mexico
- Bats: Right Throws: Right
Medals
Men's baseball
Representing Mexico
Pan American Games
Bronze medal – third place	2007 Rio de Janeiro	Team
Central American and Caribbean Games
Silver medal – second place	2010 Mayagüez	Team

Efrén Espinoza Rodríguez (born 12 September 1980) is a Mexican professional baseball manager and coach and former infielder. Espinoza spent a season playing minor league baseball in the Pittsburgh Pirates organization; afterward, he continued his career in Mexico, playing in the Mexican League (LMB) from 2002 to 2014 and in the Mexican Pacific League (LMP), where he participated in five seasons.

Espinoza represented Mexico, winning the bronze medal at the 2007 Pan American Games and the silver medal at the 2010 Central American and Caribbean Games.

== Playing career ==
=== Early career ===
Espinoza was born on 12 September 1980 in Ciudad Obregón, Sonora. In 1998 and 1999, he played for the Mexican Stars teams that competed in the rookie Arizona League. In 2000, he made his professional debut in the Mexican League (LMB) playing for the Diablos Rojos del México, hitting .263/.293/.289 in 22 appearances.

=== Minor leagues ===
In 2001, Espinoza was signed by the Pittsburgh Pirates organization, he played for the Lynchburg Hillcats of the High-A Carolina League and the Hickory Crawdads of the Class A South Atlantic League, totaling 69 appearances with the organization.

=== Mexican League ===
After being released by the Pirates, Espinoza returned to Mexico to play with the Diablos Rojos in the Mexican League, where he spent the three seasons from 2002 to 2005. During this period, he also had a brief stint with the Vaqueros Laguna in 2003.

Espinoza continued his Mexican League career with the Guerreros de Oaxaca in 2006 before returning to the Diablos Rojos del México for the 2007 season and the first part of the 2008 season. He was later traded to the Guerreros de Oaxaca, with whom he finished the 2008 season and played the 2009 season. In 2010, he played for the Petroleros de Minatitlán, before joining the Acereros de Monclova, with whom he played during the 2010 season and part of the 2011 season. He finished the 2011 season playing for the Leones de Yucatán.

In 2012, he joined the Olmecas de Tabasco and returned to Vaqueros Laguna for the 2013 season. In February 2014, Espinoza signed with the Toros de Tijuana in the team's inaugural season, and he retired after the end of the year.

=== Mexican Pacific League ===
Espinoza also played winter baseball in the Mexican Pacific League (LMP). He made his debut in 2002, playing for his hometown team, the Yaquis de Obregón. From 2006 to 2008, he played for the Algodoneros de Guasave. He spent the 2008–09 season with the Tomateros de Culiacán and last played in the LMP during the 2010–11 season for Guasave.

== International career ==
Espinoza was part of the Mexican team that won the bronze medal at the 2007 Pan American Games in Rio de Janeiro. He appeared in four games, recording four hits, two runs, three RBI and a .333 batting average over 11 at bats.

== Coaching career ==
Espinoza was appointed as manager of the Generales de Durango on 20 May 2019, replacing Lorenzo Bundy. He debuted on 21 May with a 12–5 win against the Bravos de León. On 22 July, Espinoza was demoted to bench coach, a position he held since 2018, and replaced by Juan José Pacho as manager; he recorded 22 wins and 25 losses during his tenure as manager of the Generales. In 2023, Espinoza switched positions to first base coach for the Generales.

On 11 Februar 2025, Espinoza joined the Toros de Tijuana of the Mexican League as their first base coach. On October 30, Espinoza was fired by the team.

In August 2026, Espinoza joined the Águilas de Mexicali of the Mexican Pacific League as their first base coach.

== Managerial statistics ==
=== Mexican League ===
Year	Team	Regular season						Postseason			
Year	Team	Games	Won	Lost	Tied	Pct.	Finish	Won	Lost	Pct.	Notes
2019	Generales de Durango	47	22	25	0	.468	7th	–	–	–	–
Total		47	22	25	0	.468		–	–	–	–
