= Miguel Ojeda =

Mexican baseball player (born 1975)

- Catcher / Manager
- Born: January 29, 1975 (age 51); Guaymas, Sonora, Mexico
- Batted: Right Threw: Right

MLB debut
- May 17, 2003, for the San Diego Padres

Last MLB appearance
- October 1, 2006, for the Texas Rangers

MLB statistics
- Batting average: .224
- Home runs: 15
- Runs batted in: 72
- Stats at Baseball Reference

Teams
- San Diego Padres (2003–2005); Seattle Mariners (2005); Colorado Rockies (2006); Texas Rangers (2006)

Miguel Arturo Ojeda (born January 29, 1975) is a Mexican former professional baseball catcher. He has also served as a manager for both the Mexican League and Minor League Baseball, winning the 2014 Mexican League championship with the Diablos Rojos del México.

== Playing career ==
=== Minor leagues ===
Ojeda was signed by the Pittsburgh Pirates in 1993 from the Mexico City Reds. He played in Pittsburgh's minor league system in 1993, 1994, and 1998, also playing in the Mexican Baseball League.

=== Major leagues ===
Ojeda played in Major League Baseball from 2003 to 2006. He made his debut with the San Diego Padres on May 17, 2003. San Diego traded him and Nathanael Mateo to the Seattle Mariners for catcher Miguel Olivo on July 31, 2005.

Ojeda was invited to spring training with the Colorado Rockies prior to the 2006 season as a non-roster invitee. He was not expected to make the roster; however, when Yorvit Torrealba was injured, Ojeda made the Opening Day roster serving as the backup catcher to starter Danny Ardoin. Although Ojeda impressed early in the 2006 season, providing the team with valuable clutch hitting and serviceable defense, he was sent down to Triple-A Colorado Springs once Torrealba was activated. Ojeda was then loaned to Mexico City of the Mexican League, before being traded to the Texas Rangers.

Ojeda signed a one-year, $430,000 contract with the Rangers on November 16, 2006. On April 1, 2007, he was optioned to the Triple-A Oklahoma RedHawks. On May 27, Ojeda was designated for assignment. He returned to the Mexican League with the Diablos Rojos in 2007.

== Managing career ==
In 2012, Ojeda was named as the Manager of the Diablos Rojos in the Mexican League. Ojeda was named the 2014 Mexican League Manager of the Year and led the Red Devils (70-42) to their 16th title in franchise history. In 2015, Ojeda was selected as the manager of the Double-A affiliate of the San Francisco Giants, the Richmond Flying Squirrels.

In 2018, he became part-owner of the Generales de Durango club of the Mexican League.

On 2 February 2021, he was appointed manager of the Diablos Rojos, replacing Sergio Omar Gastélum.

== Managerial statistics ==
=== Mexican League ===
Year	Team	Regular season						Postseason			
Year	Team	Games	Won	Lost	Tied	Pct.	Finish	Won	Lost	Pct.	Notes
2013	Diablos Rojos del México	109	58	51	0	.532	4th in North	1	3	.250	Lost First round (Saltillo)
2014	Diablos Rojos del México	112	70	42	0	.625	1st in North	12	2	.857	Won Serie del Rey (Puebla)
2015	Diablos Rojos del México	113	73	39	1	.650	1st in North	3	4	.429	Lost First round (Tijuana)
2017	Diablos Rojos del México	109	57	52	0	.523	6th in North	–	–	–	–
2021	Diablos Rojos del México	65	41	23	1	.638	1st in South	9	6	.600	Lost Championship Series (Yucatán)
Total		508	299	207	2	.591		25	15	.625	
