= 2019 Mexican Baseball League season =

2019 Mexican League season
- League: Mexican League
- Sport: Baseball
- Duration: April 4 – October 2
- Teams: 16

Serie del Rey
- Champions: Acereros de Monclova
- Runners-up: Leones de Yucatán
- Finals MVP: Noah Perio

LMB seasons
- ← 2018 2021 →

The 2019 Mexican League season was the 95th season in the history of the Mexican League in baseball. It was contested by 16 teams, evenly divided in North and South zones. The season started on 4 April with the series between Sultanes de Monterrey and Leones de Yucatán and ended on 2 October with the last game of the Serie del Rey, where Acereros de Monclova defeated Leones de Yucatán to win the championship.

== Standings ==
North
Rank	Team	W	L	Pct.	GB	STK
1	Acereros de Monclova	75	45	.625	—	W1
2	Toros de Tijuana	75	45	.625	—	L1
3	Sultanes de Monterrey	72	45	.615	1.5	W4
4	Saraperos de Saltillo	66	53	.555	8.5	W1
5	Tecolotes de los Dos Laredos	60	60	.500	15.0	L1
6	Rieleros de Aguascalientes	54	65	.454	20.5	L1
7	Generales de Durango	46	72	.390	28.0	W1
8	Algodoneros de Unión Laguna	37	79	.319	36.0	L3

South
Rank	Team	W	L	Pct.	GB	STK
1	Diablos Rojos del México	67	49	.578	—	W2
2	Guerreros de Oaxaca	68	51	.571	0.5	W3
3	Leones de Yucatán	66	52	.559	2.0	W2
4	Tigres de Quintana Roo	62	57	.521	6.5	W4
5	Pericos de Puebla	56	60	.483	11.0	L2
6	Piratas de Campeche	47	68	.409	19.5	L3
7	Bravos de León	47	70	.402	20.5	L2
8	Olmecas de Tabasco	45	72	.385	22.5	L3

== Postseason ==
First stage
1	Toros de Tijuana	4
8	Saraperos de Saltillo	2
North
4	Acereros de Monclova	4
5	Sultanes de Monterrey	3
2	Diablos Rojos del México	4
7	Tigres de Quintana Roo	3
South
3	Guerreros de Oaxaca	1
6	Leones de Yucatán	4

Championship Series
1	Toros de Tijuana	3
2	Acereros de Monclova	4
1	Diablos Rojos del México	0
3	Leones de Yucatán	4

Serie del Rey
N2	Acereros de Monclova	4
S3	Leones de Yucatán	3

== Managerial changes ==
=== Off season ===
Team	Former manager	Reason for leaving	New manager	Ref.
Algodoneros de Unión Laguna	(Mexico) Ramón Orantes	Resigned	(Mexico) Jonathan Aceves	
Olmecas de Tabasco	(Puerto Rico) Eddie Castro	Fired	(Mexico) Ramón Orantes	
Saraperos de Saltillo	(Panama) Len Picota	Fired	(Mexico) Roberto Vizcarra	

=== In season ===
Team	Former manager	Interim manager	Reason for leaving	New manager	Ref.
Acereros de Monclova	(Mexico) Pedro Meré	N/A	Fired	(United States) Pat Listach	
Bravos de León	(Mexico) Antonio Aguilera	N/A	Fired	(Mexico) Luis Carlos Rivera	
Generales de Durango	(United States) Lorenzo Bundy	N/A	Fired	(Mexico) Efrén Espinoza	
Generales de Durango	(Mexico) Efrén Espinoza	N/A	Fired	(Mexico) Juan José Pacho	
Leones de Yucatán	(Mexico) Luis Carlos Rivera	N/A	Fired	(Mexico) Gerónimo Gil	
Pericos de Puebla	(Mexico) Enrique Reyes	N/A	Fired	(Mexico) Carlos Gastélum	
Piratas de Campeche	(United States) Tim Johnson	N/A	Fired	(Mexico) Jesús Sommers	
Rieleros de Aguascalientes	(Cuba) Joe Álvarez	N/A	Fired	(Dominican Republic) Félix Fermín	
Tecolotes de los Dos Laredos	(Dominican Republic) Félix Fermín	N/A	Fired	(Mexico) Houston Jiménez	
Tecolotes de los Dos Laredos	(Mexico) Houston Jiménez	N/A	Fired	(Dominican Republic) Rafael Rijo	
Tigres de Quintana Roo	(Mexico) Jesús Sommers	N/A	Fired	(Mexico) Adán Muñoz	

== League leaders ==
Batting leaders
Stat	Player	Team	Total
AVG	(Venezuela) Daniel Mayora	Generales de Durango	.391
HR	(United States) Chris Carter	Acereros de Monclova	49
RBI	(United States) Chris Carter	Acereros de Monclova	119
R	(United States) Alonzo Harris	Guerreros de Oaxaca	131
H	(Venezuela) Daniel Mayora	Generales de Durango	177
SB	(United States) Johnny Davis	Guerreros de Oaxaca	54
SLG	(United States) Chris Carter	Acereros de Monclova	.709

Pitching leaders
Stat	Player	Team	Total
ERA	(Dominican Republic) César Valdez	Leones de Yucatán	2.26
W	(Dominican Republic) César Valdez	Leones de Yucatán	15
SV	(Dominican Republic) Román Méndez	Tecolotes de los Dos Laredos	32
IP	(Japan) Yasutomo Kubo	Bravos de León	152.0
K	(Japan) Yasutomo Kubo	Bravos de León	154
WHIP	(Dominican Republic) César Valdez	Leones de Yucatán	1.06

== Awards ==
LMB Awards
Award	Player	Team	Ref.
Most Valuable Player	(United States) Alonzo Harris	Guerreros de Oaxaca	
Rookie of the Year	(United States) Erick Migueles	Tigres de Quintana Roo	
Best Pitcher	(Dominican Republic) César Valdez	Leones de Yucatán	
Best Relief Pitcher	(Mexico) Carlos Bustamante	Acereros de Monclova	
Manager of the Year	(Mexico) Roberto Vizcarra	Saraperos de Saltillo	
