= Andrés Ávila (baseball) =

Mexican baseball player (born 1990)

Toros de Tijuana
- Pitcher
- Born: June 20, 1990 (age 35); Guaymas, Sonora, Mexico
- Bats: Right Throws: Right
- Stats at Baseball Reference

Andrés Ávila Navarro (born June 20, 1990) is a Mexican professional baseball pitcher for the Toros de Tijuana of the Mexican League.

== Career ==
=== Oakland Athletics ===
Ávila signed as a non–drafted free agent with the Oakland Athletics on April 5, 2010. He played with their rookie Arizona League Athletics in 2010 and 2011. In 2012, he advanced to the Low–A Vermont Lake Monsters. He pitched for both the Single–A Beloit Snappers and High–A Stockton Ports in 2013 and 2014. In 2015, he pitched for Stockton and the Double-A Midland RockHounds.

Ávila spent the entirety of the 2016 campaign with Double–A Midland, compiling a 6–3 record and 3.59 ERA with 77 strikeouts across 40 appearances. He elected free agency following the season on November 7, 2016.

=== Leones de Yucatán ===
On November 11, 2016, Ávila signed as a minor league contract with the Atlanta Braves. He was released by the Braves on April 3, 2017.

On June 24, 2017, Ávila signed with the Tigres de Quintana Roo of the Mexican Baseball League. He was traded to the Leones de Yucatán on June 25, 2017. Avila did not play in a game in 2020 due to the cancellation of the Mexican League season because of the COVID-19 pandemic. He was waived on July 3, 2023.

=== Toros de Tijuana ===
On July 4, 2023, Ávila was claimed off waivers by the Toros de Tijuana of the Mexican League.

== International career ==
Ávila was selected for the Mexico national baseball team at the 2017 World Baseball Classic and 2019 exhibition games against Japan.
