= Vicente Palacios (baseball) =

Mexican baseball player (born 1963)

Saraperos de Saltillo
- Pitcher / Coach
- Born: July 19, 1963 (age 62); Manlio Fabio Altamirano, Veracruz, Mexico
- Batted: Right Threw: Right

MLB debut
- September 4, 1987, for the Pittsburgh Pirates

Last MLB appearance
- May 11, 2000, for the San Diego Padres

MLB statistics
- Win–loss record: 17–20
- Earned run average: 4.43
- Strikeouts: 270
- Stats at Baseball Reference

Teams
- Pittsburgh Pirates (1987–1988, 1990–1992); St. Louis Cardinals (1994–1995); San Diego Padres (2000)

Vicente Palacios Díaz (born July 19, 1963) is a Mexican former professional baseball pitcher who currently serves as the bullpen coach for the Saraperos de Saltillo of the Mexican League. He played all or parts of eight seasons in Major League Baseball (MLB) for the Pittsburgh Pirates (1987–88 and 1990–92), St. Louis Cardinals (1994–95), and San Diego Padres (2000).

== Playing career ==
Palacios began his professional career in the Mexican League in 1983 for the Rojos del Águila de Veracruz. In 1984, he was purchased from Veracruz by the Chicago White Sox, but after two seasons with their double-A farm team, the Glens Falls White Sox, he was released. He was then signed by the Pirates, making his debut with them in September 1987. He was a member of the Pirates National League East division champions for three straight seasons, from 1990 to 1992.

After being released by the Pirates following the 1992 season, Palacios was signed by the Cardinals. After spending spring training with the Padres, he returned to Mexico for a season before signing with the Cardinals. He spent two seasons with St. Louis before being released after the 1995 season. After returning to Mexico once more for three years, he was picked up by the New York Mets in July 1999, appearing in seven games for their Norfolk Tides affiliate. He became a free agent after the season, signing with the Padres. He made his final major league appearance in May 2000, and was released that August. He was picked up by the Chicago Cubs, finishing the year with the triple-A Iowa Cubs. He returned to Mexico once more in 2001, playing for the Saraperos de Saltillo, the Piratas de Campeche, and finally the Tecolotes de los Dos Laredos in 2003 before retiring at age 40.

In 8 Major League Baseball seasons, Palacios had a 17–20 win–loss record. He appeared in 134 games, including 44 games started, 2 of which were complete games, both shutouts. In his 90 relief appearances, he finished 26 games, including 7 saves. In 372 innings pitched, Palacios allowed 348 hits, including 44 home runs. He gave 190 runs, 183 of them earned runs for an earned run average of 4.43. He walked 158 batters while striking out 270.

== Coaching career ==
After working for three seasons as the pitching coach of the Olmecas de Tabasco, Palacios was appointed interim manager of the Olmecas on 5 June 2013; after five games and a 2–3 record, he was replaced by Enrique Reyes.

Palacios was appointed interim manager of Vaqueros Laguna on 30 April 2016 replacing Mario Mendoza.

On January 6, 2026, Palacios was hired to serve as the pitching coach for the Saraperos de Saltillo of the Mexican League.
