= Ryan Long =

American baseball player (born 1973)

Toros de Tijuana
- Outfielder / Coach
- Born: February 3, 1973 (age 53); Houston, Texas, U.S.
- Batted: Right Threw: Right

MLB debut
- July 16, 1997, for the Kansas City Royals

Last MLB appearance
- July 23, 1997, for the Kansas City Royals

MLB statistics
- Batting average: .222
- Home runs: 0
- Runs batted in: 2
- Stats at Baseball Reference

Teams
- Kansas City Royals (1997)

Ryan Marcus Long (born February 3, 1973) is an American former professional baseball outfielder who currently serves as the hitting coach for the Toros de Tijuana of the Mexican League. He played in Major League Baseball (MLB) for the Kansas City Royals during the 1997 season.

== Playing career ==
In six games Long had two hits in nine at-bats, with two RBI. He played right field, batting and throwing right-handed. He was drafted by the Royals in the second round of the 1991 Major League Baseball draft. Although he played in only six games for the Royals, Long spent ten seasons playing at various levels in the minor leagues. While playing baseball for Dobie High School in Texas, Long and the Longhorns lost a playoff game against a team on which future New York Yankee, Andy Pettitte played.

== Coaching career ==
For several years Long was the hitting coach for the Pittsburgh Pirates' High-A affiliate, the Bradenton Marauders in the Florida State League. He previously served as a hitting coach for the Altoona Curve which is the Pirates High-A affiliate and the Burlington Bees, the Midwest League affiliate for the Royals. In 2018 and 2019, Long was the hitting coach for the Triple-A Indianapolis Indians. He was also batting coach for the Lotte Giants of the KBO League from 2020–2023. The Toronto Blue Jays hired Long in 2024 to be the hitting coach for the Triple-A Buffalo Bisons.

On November 9, 2025, Long was hired to serve as the hitting coach for the Toros de Tijuana of the Mexican League.
