= Mario Meza =

Mexican baseball player (born 1990)

Toros de Tijuana – No. 50
- Pitcher
- Born: November 24, 1990 (age 35); Culiacán, Sinaloa, Mexico
- Bats: Right Throws: Right
- Stats at Baseball Reference

José Mario Meza Mendoza (born November 24, 1990) is a Mexican professional baseball pitcher for the Toros de Tijuana of the Mexican League. Meza was selected for the Mexico national baseball team at the 2017 World Baseball Classic and 2019 Pan American Games Qualifier.

== Career ==
=== Tigres de Quintana Roo ===
On March 14, 2012, Meza signed with the Tigres de Quintana Roo of the Mexican League. In 11 games, he logged a 4.50 ERA with 6 strikeouts over 22 innings of work. Meza made 17 appearances (5 starts) for Quintana Roo in 2013, but struggled to a 1–2 record and 6.00 ERA with 33 strikeouts in 39 innings pitched.

=== Saraperos de Saltillo ===
On June 4, 2013, Meza was traded to the Saraperos de Saltillo. In 13 games (8 starts) down the stretch, he struggled to an 0–6 record and 7.87 ERA with 39 strikeouts across 42 1/3 innings pitched. Meza made 6 starts for Saltillo in 2014, recording an 8.71 ERA with 13 strikeouts over 20 2/3 innings of work.

=== Leones de Yucatán ===
On June 3, 2014, Meza was assigned to the Leones de Yucatán. In 20 games for the team, he logged a 3.75 ERA with 18 strikeouts over 24 innings pitched. Meza did not appear in a game for the team in 2015.

Meza made 53 appearances for Yucatán in 2016, compiling a 4–2 record and 1.59 ERA with 51 strikeouts and a league–leading 24 holds in 51 innings of work. On November 15, 2016, Meza signed a minor league contract with the Chicago Cubs organization. On March 30, 2017, Meza was assigned to the Leones. In 31 appearances out of the bullpen, he posted a 3.26 ERA with 32 strikeouts across 30 1/3 innings pitched, and did not allow a single home run.

=== Saraperos de Saltillo (second stint) ===
On August 14, 2018, Meza was assigned to the Saraperos de Saltillo. He made nine starts for the team down the stretch, struggling to a 9.95 ERA with five strikeouts. Meza was released by the Cubs organization on March 18, 2019. Returning to Saltillo, he made 61 appearances for the Saraperos in 2019, registering a 6–2 record and 3.53 ERA with 82 strikeouts and 6 saves across 58 2/3 innings pitched. On October 4, 2019, Meza was returned to the Leones by Saltillo. Meza did not play in a game in 2020 due to the cancellation of the Mexican League season because of the COVID-19 pandemic.

In 2021, Meza's rights were re–acquired by Saltillo, and he registered a 2.92 ERA with 27 strikeouts and five saves across 26 appearances. He made 17 appearances for the Saraperos during the 2022 season, struggling to a 6.39 ERA with nine strikeouts across 12 2/3 innings of work.

In 2023, Meza made 41 relief outings for Saltillo, recording a 2.70 ERA with 43 strikeouts across 36 2/3 innings pitched. He made 36 appearances for the team during the 2024 season, compiling a 2.90 ERA with 41 strikeouts across 31 innings pitched.

On April 26, 2025, Meza, Kurt Heyer, Deolis Guerra, Danis Correa, and Ryan Meisinger combined to no-hit the Dorados de Chihuahua. He made 42 total appearances for Saltillo during the regular season, logging a 1–1 record and 4.82 ERA with 50 strikeouts.

Meza began the 2026 campaign with the Saraperos, recording a 4.63 ERA with 15 strikeouts.

=== Toros de Tijuana ===
On May 29, 2026, Meza was loaned to the Toros de Tijuana of the Mexican League for the remainder of the 2026 season.
