= Lonnie Summers =

American baseball player

- Infielder
- Born: August 2, 1915; Davis, Oklahoma, U.S.
- Died: August 24, 1999 (aged 84); Inglewood, California, U.S.
- Batted: Right Threw: Right

Negro league baseball debut
- 1938, for the Baltimore Elite Giants

Last appearance
- 1951, for the Chicago American Giants

Teams
- Baltimore Elite Giants (1938); Chicago American Giants (1948–1949, 1951)

Lonnie Summers (August 2, 1915 – August 24, 1999), nicknamed "Carl", was an American Negro league infielder from the 1930s to the 1950s.

== Career ==
A native of Davis, Oklahoma, Summers attended Jacob Riis High School in Los Angeles, California. A strong hitter known for his powerful line drives, he made his Negro leagues debut in 1938 with the Baltimore Elite Giants. Summers played several years in the Mexican League, and served in the United States Army in World War II.

Sommers played in the Mexican League from 1940 to 1941 and then from 1946 to 1949, with the Alijadores de Tampico, Dorados de Chihuahua, Gallos de Santa Rosa, La Junta de Nuevo Laredo, Azules de Veracruz and Diablos Rojos del México. During this time, he won two championships: in 1940 with Azules de Veracruz and in 1946 with Tampico.

After his wartime service, Summers played for the Chicago American Giants, and was selected to play in the 1949 East–West All-Star Game. He also played several seasons in the minor leagues, including the 1952 and 1953 seasons with the San Diego Padres of the Pacific Coast League. Summers died in Inglewood, California in 1999 at age 84.

== Personal life ==
While playing in Mexico, Summers married to a Mexican woman, Armida López, and had a son, Jesús, who also became a professional baseball player.
