= Mayas de Chetumal =

Defunct professional baseball team in the Mexican League

Information
- League: Mexican League (1998)
- Location: Chetumal, Quintana Roo
- Ballpark: Nachan Ka'an Baseball Stadium
- Established: 1998
- Folded: 1999
- Colors: Turquoise and orange

The Mayas de Chetumal (English: Chetumal Mayans) were a professional baseball team based in Chetumal, Quintana Roo, Mexico. The Mayas played only one season in the Mexican League, in 1998, before relocating to Veracruz, where they were rebranded as a revival of El Águila de Veracruz.

== History ==
The Mayas de Chetumal were established in 1998, after the Petroleros de Poza Rica franchise relocated from Poza Rica, Veracruz to Chetumal, capital city of Quintana Roo, supported by the state government. To host the team, the Nachan Ka'an Baseball Stadium was refurbished to accommodate professional baseball, expanding its capacity to 6,500 spectators.

Jesús Sommers was appointed as manager of the team, that signed Oscar Azócar, Mark Whiten, both with previous experience in Major League Baseball, and Héctor de la Cruz among others. Raúl Cano replaced Sommers as manager during the season and remained in the position until the season’s end. The Mayas finished the season fourth in the South Zone with a 51–67 record.

In 1999, the franchise relocated the Veracruz where it was rebranded as the Rojos del Águila de Veracruz.

== Season-by-season ==
Season	League	Division	Finish	Wins	Loses	Win%	GB	Postseason	Manager	Ref
1998	LMB	South	4th	51	67	.432	14.0	Did not qualify	(Mexico) Jesús Sommers (Mexico) Raúl Cano	
