= Ryan Meisinger =

American baseball player (born 1994)

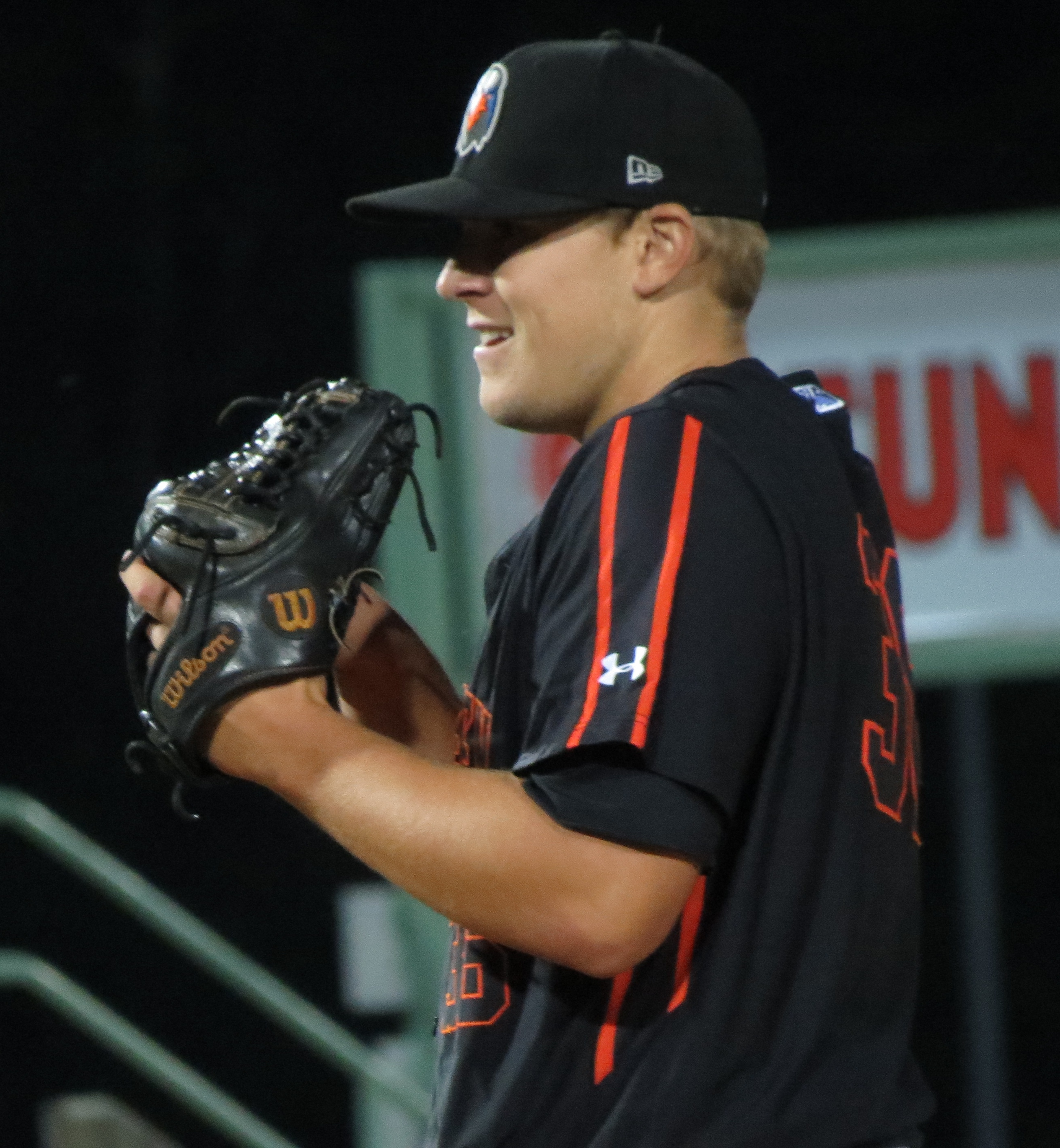
- Meisinger with the Aberdeen IronBirds in 2015
- Pitcher
- Born: May 4, 1994 (age 32); Prince Frederick, Maryland, U.S.
- Batted: Right Threw: Right

MLB debut
- June 29, 2018, for the Baltimore Orioles

Last MLB appearance
- August 27, 2021, for the Chicago Cubs

MLB statistics
- Win–loss record: 2–1
- Earned run average: 7.26
- Strikeouts: 30
- Stats at Baseball Reference

Teams
- Baltimore Orioles (2018); St. Louis Cardinals (2020); Chicago Cubs (2021)

Ryan Thomas Meisinger (born May 4, 1994) is an American former professional baseball pitcher. He played in Major League Baseball (MLB) for the Baltimore Orioles, St. Louis Cardinals, and Chicago Cubs. He currently serves as a pitching coach for the Florida Complex League Twins.

== Amateur career ==
Meisinger attended Northern High School in Owings, Maryland. After graduating high school, he attended Radford University where he played college baseball for the Radford Highlanders. As a junior in 2015, he had a 5–0 win–loss record with a 1.62 earned run average (ERA).

== Professional career ==
=== Baltimore Orioles ===
The Orioles selected Meisinger in the 11th round of the 2015 MLB draft, and he signed. He made his professional debut with the Gulf Coast League Orioles, and after one scoreless inning in which he struck out the side, he was promoted to the Aberdeen IronBirds where he finished the year with a 1.99 ERA in 22 2/3 relief innings pitched. In 2016, he pitched for the Delmarva Shorebirds and Frederick Keys where he was 6–4 with a 1.57 ERA in 74 2/3 relief innings pitched between both teams, and in 2017, he played with the Bowie Baysox where he pitched to a 4–3 record and 3.00 ERA in 63 innings pitched out of the bullpen. He began 2018 with Bowie and was promoted to the Norfolk Tides in May.

Meisinger was promoted to the major leagues on June 29, 2018, and he made his major league debut that same night, pitching 1 2/3 innings in relief in which he gave up one run on two hits, striking out one.

=== St. Louis Cardinals ===
On December 10, 2018, Meisinger was claimed off waivers by the St. Louis Cardinals.

Meisinger was designated for assignment by the Cardinals on December 21, 2018 to make room on their 40-man roster for Andrew Miller. He cleared waivers and was outrighted to the Memphis Redbirds.

On August 17, 2020, Meisinger was selected to the active roster. Meisinger was designated for assignment by the Cardinals on September 8, 2020. In his time in the majors in 2020, Meisinger pitched 2 2/3 scoreless innings, allowing only one hit and four walks while striking out three. Meisinger elected free agency on October 5, 2020.

=== Chicago Cubs ===
On March 1, 2021, Meisinger signed a minor league contract with the Chicago Cubs organization. On May 9, he pitched the ninth inning of a no-hitter against the Indianapolis Indians at Principal Park in Des Moines, Iowa. Preceded on the mound by Shelby Miller, Tommy Nance, and Brad Wieck, he completed the combined no-hit game and earned a save. On August 12, 2021, Meisinger's contract was selected by the Cubs. Meisinger made seven appearances for the Cubs, struggling to a 12.27 ERA with six strikeouts. On August 28, he was designated for assignment by the Cubs.

=== Los Angeles Dodgers ===
On August 31, Meisinger was claimed off of waivers by the Los Angeles Dodgers. He spent one day on the major league roster before being optioned to the Triple–A Oklahoma City Dodgers without appearing in a game. He was outrighted off the 40-man roster on September 5. In Triple–A, he allowed only one earned run in 10 2/3 innings over 10 games for a 1.69 ERA. On October 8, Meisinger elected free agency.

=== Arizona Diamondbacks ===
On March 22, 2022, Meisinger signed a minor league contract with the Arizona Diamondbacks. In 13 appearances for the Triple-A Reno Aces, he struggled to a 1-2 record and 6.14 ERA with 16 strikeouts across 14 2/3 innings pitched. Meisinger was released by the Diamondbacks organization on May 24.

=== Long Island Ducks ===
On June 3, 2022, Meisinger signed with the Long Island Ducks of the Atlantic League of Professional Baseball. In 22 appearances (6 starts) for the Ducks, he registered a 3–3 record and 7.06 ERA with 48 strikeouts across 43 1/3 innings pitched. Meisinger became a free agent following the season.

=== Cincinnati Reds ===
On May 19, 2023, Meisinger signed a minor league contract with the Cincinnati Reds and was assigned to Double-A Chattanooga Lookouts. In 33 relief outings split between Chattanooga and the Triple–A Louisville Bats, he accumulated a 6.30 ERA with 50 strikeouts and 10 saves across 40 innings. Meisinger elected free agency following the season on November 6.

=== High Point Rockers ===
On April 15, 2024, Meisinger signed with the High Point Rockers of the Atlantic League of Professional Baseball. In 23 appearances for the Rockers, he compiled a 1.09 ERA with 34 strikeouts across 24 2/3 innings pitched. On July 3, Meisinger was released by High Point to pursue an opportunity in the Mexican League.

=== Diablos Rojos del México ===
On July 5, 2024, Meisinger signed with the Diablos Rojos del México of the Mexican League. He made 9 scoreless appearances for the Diablos, striking out 11 batters over 9 1/3 innings of relief. With the team, Meisinger won the Serie del Rey.

=== Saraperos de Saltillo ===
On February 11, 2025, Meisinger was traded to the Saraperos de Saltillo of the Mexican League. On April 26, Meisinger, Kurt Heyer, Deolis Guerra, Mario Meza, and Danis Correa combined to no-hit the Dorados de Chihuahua. In 21 appearances for Saltillo, he struggled to a 6.86 ERA with 15 strikeouts and three saves across 19 2/3 innings pitched.

=== El Águila de Veracruz ===
On June 16, 2025, Meisinger, Braulio Torres-Pérez, and Cristian Santana were traded to El Águila de Veracruz of the Mexican League in exchange for Jake Sanchez. In seven appearances for Veracruz, he logged an 0-1 record and 6.30 ERA with 11 strikeouts and one save over 10 innings of relief. Meisinger was released by the team on December 4.

== Coaching career ==
On January 15, 2026, Meisinger was hired to serve as a pitching coach for the Florida Complex League Twins, the rookie-level affiliate of the Minnesota Twins.
