= 2016 Mexican Baseball League season =

2016 Mexican League season
- League: Mexican League
- Sport: Baseball
- Duration: April 1 – September 14
- Teams: 16

Serie del Rey
- Champions: Pericos de Puebla
- Runners-up: Toros de Tijuana
- Finals MVP: Travis Blackley

LMB seasons
- ← 2015 2017 →

The 2016 Mexican League season was the 92nd season in the history of the Mexican League. It was contested by 16 teams, evenly divided in North and South zones. The season started on 1 April with the series between Tigres de Quintana Roo and Leones de Yucatán and ended on 14 September with the last game of the Serie del Rey, where Pericos de Puebla defeated Toros de Tijuana to win the championship.

== Standings ==
North
Rank	Team	W	L	Pct.	GB	STK
1	Sultanes de Monterrey	72	39	.649	—	W1
2	Acereros de Monclova	69	43	.616	3.5	W3
3	Toros de Tijuana	64	48	.571	8.5	W1
4	Vaqueros de la Laguna	63	50	.558	10.0	L1
5	Diablos Rojos del México	57	54	.514	15.0	L1
6	Rieleros de Aguascalientes	53	58	.477	19.0	W2
7	Saraperos de Saltillo	50	61	.450	22.0	L2
8	Broncos de Reynosa	24	88	.214	48.5	L12

South
Rank	Team	W	L	Pct.	GB	STK
1	Leones de Yucatán	77	33	.700	—	W1
2	Pericos de Puebla	74	38	.661	4.0	W3
3	Tigres de Quintana Roo	68	45	.602	10.5	L1
4	Piratas de Campeche	57	51	.528	19.0	L3
5	Olmecas de Tabasco	44	67	.396	33.5	W2
6	Rojos del Águila de Veracruz	43	67	.391	34.0	L2
7	Guerreros de Oaxaca	42	70	.375	36.0	L3
8	Delfines de Ciudad del Carmen	31	76	.290	44.5	W1

== Postseason ==
First stage
1	Sultanes de Monterrey	4
8	Vaqueros de la Laguna	0
North
4	Acereros de Monclova	0
5	Toros de Tijuana	4
2	Leones de Yucatán	4
7	Piratas de Campeche	2
South
3	Pericos de Puebla	4
6	Tigres de Quintana Roo	0

Championship Series
1	Sultanes de Monterrey	3
3	Toros de Tijuana	4
1	Leones de Yucatán	2
2	Pericos de Puebla	4

Serie del Rey
N3	Toros de Tijuana	2
S2	Pericos de Puebla	4

=== First round ===
Sultanes de Monterrey won the series, 4–0.

Game	Date	Score	Location	Time	Attendance
1	August 16 and 17	Laguna – 2, Monterrey – 8	Estadio de Béisbol Monterrey	-	3,473
2	August 18	Laguna – 5, Monterrey – 13	Estadio de Béisbol Monterrey	-	16,941
3	August 20	Monterrey – 9, Laguna – 4	Estadio Revolución	-	9,185
4	August 21	Monterrey – 2, Laguna – 0	Estadio Revolución	-	7,367

Toros de Tijuana won the series, 4–0.

Game	Date	Score	Location	Time	Attendance
1	August 16	Tijuana – 5, Monclova – 3	Estadio de Béisbol Monclova	-	6,508
2	August 17	Tijuana – 4, Monclova – 2 (11 inn.)	Estadio de Béisbol Monclova	-	4,777
3	August 19	Monclova – 4, Tijuana – 6	Estadio Gasmart	-	15,024
4	August 20	Monclova – 1, Tijuana – 2	Estadio Gasmart	-	15,989

Leones de Yucatán won the series, 4–2.

Game	Date	Score	Location	Time	Attendance
1	August 16	Campeche – 0, Yucatán – 4	Parque Kukulcán Alamo	-	10,982
2	August 17	Campeche – 1, Yucatán – 3	Parque Kukulcán Alamo	-	11,321
3	August 19	Yucatán – 1, Campeche – 3	Estadio Nelson Barrera	-	5,771
4	August 20	Yucatán – 7, Campeche – 11	Estadio Nelson Barrera	-	5,893
5	August 21	Yucatán – 6, Campeche – 5	Estadio Nelson Barrera	-	5,811
6	August 23	Campeche – 1, Yucatán – 7	Parque Kukulcán Alamo	-	12,000

Pericos de Puebla won the series, 4–0.

Game	Date	Score	Location	Time	Attendance
1	August 16	Quintana Roo – 0, Puebla – 9	Estadio de Béisbol Hermanos Serdán	-	10,418
2	August 17	Quintana Roo – 1, Puebla – 6	Estadio de Béisbol Hermanos Serdán	-	12,102
3	August 19	Puebla – 4, Quintana Roo – 2	Estadio de Béisbol Beto Ávila	-	6,972
4	August 20	Puebla – 7, Quintana Roo – 5	Estadio de Béisbol Beto Ávila	-	6,490

=== Championship Series ===
Toros de Tijuana won the series, 4–3.

Game	Date	Score	Location	Time	Attendance
1	August 27	Tijuana – 0, Monterrey – 3	Estadio de Béisbol Monterrey	-	21,214
2	August 28 and 29	Tijuana – 0, Monterrey – 3	Estadio de Béisbol Monterrey	-	25,896
3	August 31	Monterrey – 1, Tijuana – 9	Estadio Gasmart	-	15,018
4	September 1	Monterrey – 1, Tijuana – 2	Estadio Gasmart	-	15,891
5	September 2	Monterrey – 0, Tijuana – 2	Estadio Gasmart	-	17,362
6	September 4	Tijuana – 3, Monterrey – 5	Estadio de Béisbol Monterrey	-	20,603
7	September 5	Tijuana – 2, Monterrey – 2	Estadio de Béisbol Monterrey	-	25,621

Pericos de Puebla won the series, 4–2.

Game	Date	Score	Location	Time	Attendance
1	August 27	Puebla – 2, Yucatán – 1	Parque Kukulcán Alamo	-	12,000
2	August 28	Puebla – 4, Yucatán – 0	Parque Kukulcán Alamo	-	11,000
3	August 30 and 31	Yucatán – 3, Puebla – 5	Estadio de Béisbol Hermanos Serdán	-	12,112
4	September 1	Yucatán – 5, Puebla – 1	Estadio de Béisbol Hermanos Serdán	-	12,112
5	September 2	Yucatán – 9, Puebla – 1	Estadio de Béisbol Hermanos Serdán	-	12,112
6	September 4	Puebla – 4, Yucatán – 3	Parque Kukulcán Alamo	-	12,000

=== Serie del Rey ===
Pericos de Puebla won the series, 4–2.

Game	Date	Score	Location	Time	Attendance
1	September 7	Puebla – 0, Tijuana – 1	Estadio Gasmart	-	17,399
2	September 8	Puebla – 6, Tijuana – 3	Estadio Gasmart	-	17,649
3	September 10	Tijuana – 5, Puebla – 8	Estadio de Béisbol Hermanos Serdán	-	12,112
4	September 11	Tijuana – 1, Puebla – 5	Estadio de Béisbol Hermanos Serdán	-	12,112
5	September 12	Tijuana – 9, Puebla – 2	Estadio de Béisbol Hermanos Serdán	-	12,112
6	September 14	Puebla – 2, Tijuana – 0	Estadio Gasmart	-	17,893

== League leaders ==
Batting leaders
Stat	Player	Team	Total
AVG	(Mexico) César Tapia	Pericos de Puebla	.383
HR	(Dominican Republic) Alex Valdez	Sultanes de Monterrey	30
RBI	(Dominican Republic) Diory Hernández	Rieleros de Aguascalientes	97
R	(Mexico) Chris Roberson	Sultanes de Monterrey	80
H	(United States) Justin Greene	Saraperos de Saltillo	145
SB	(United States) Justin Greene	Saraperos de Saltillo	39
SB	(Mexico) Christian Zazueta	Saraperos de Saltillo	39
SLG	(Mexico) César Tapia	Pericos de Puebla	.662

Pitching leaders
Stat	Player	Team	Total
ERA	(United States) Josh Lowey	Acereros de Monclova	1.65
W	(Cuba) Yoanner Negrín	Leones de Yucatán	18
SV	(Venezuela) Arcenio León	Acereros de Monclova	36
IP	(Cuba) Yoanner Negrín	Leones de Yucatán	141.4
K	(United States) Josh Lowey	Acereros de Monclova	131
WHIP	(United States) Josh Lowey	Acereros de Monclova	0.93

== Awards ==
LMB Awards
Award	Player	Team	Ref.
Most Valuable Player	(Mexico) César Tapia	Pericos de Puebla	
Rookie of the Year	(Mexico) Isaac Rodríguez	Toros de Tijuana	
Best Pitcher	(Cuba) Yoanner Negrín	Leones de Yucatán	
Best Relief Pitcher	(Venezuela) Arcenio León	Acereros de Monclova	
Manager of the Year	(Venezuela) Willie Romero	Leones de Yucatán	

Golden Glove Award
Position	Player	Team
Pitcher	(Mexico) Mauricio Lara	Pericos de Puebla
Catcher	(United States) Luis Flores	Sultanes de Monterrey
1st Base	(United States) Daric Barton	Pericos de Puebla
2nd Base	(Mexico) Luis Borges	Saraperos de Saltillo
3rd Base	(Mexico) Ricardo Serrano	Leones de Yucatán
Shortstop	(Mexico) Kevin Flores	Leones de Yucatán
Left fielder	(Mexico) Yancarlo Angulo	Guerreros de Oaxaca
Center fielder	(United States) Justin Greene	Saraperos de Saltillo
Right fielder	(Mexico) José Juan Aguilar	Leones de Yucatán
