= Japhet Amador =

Mexican baseball player (born 1987)

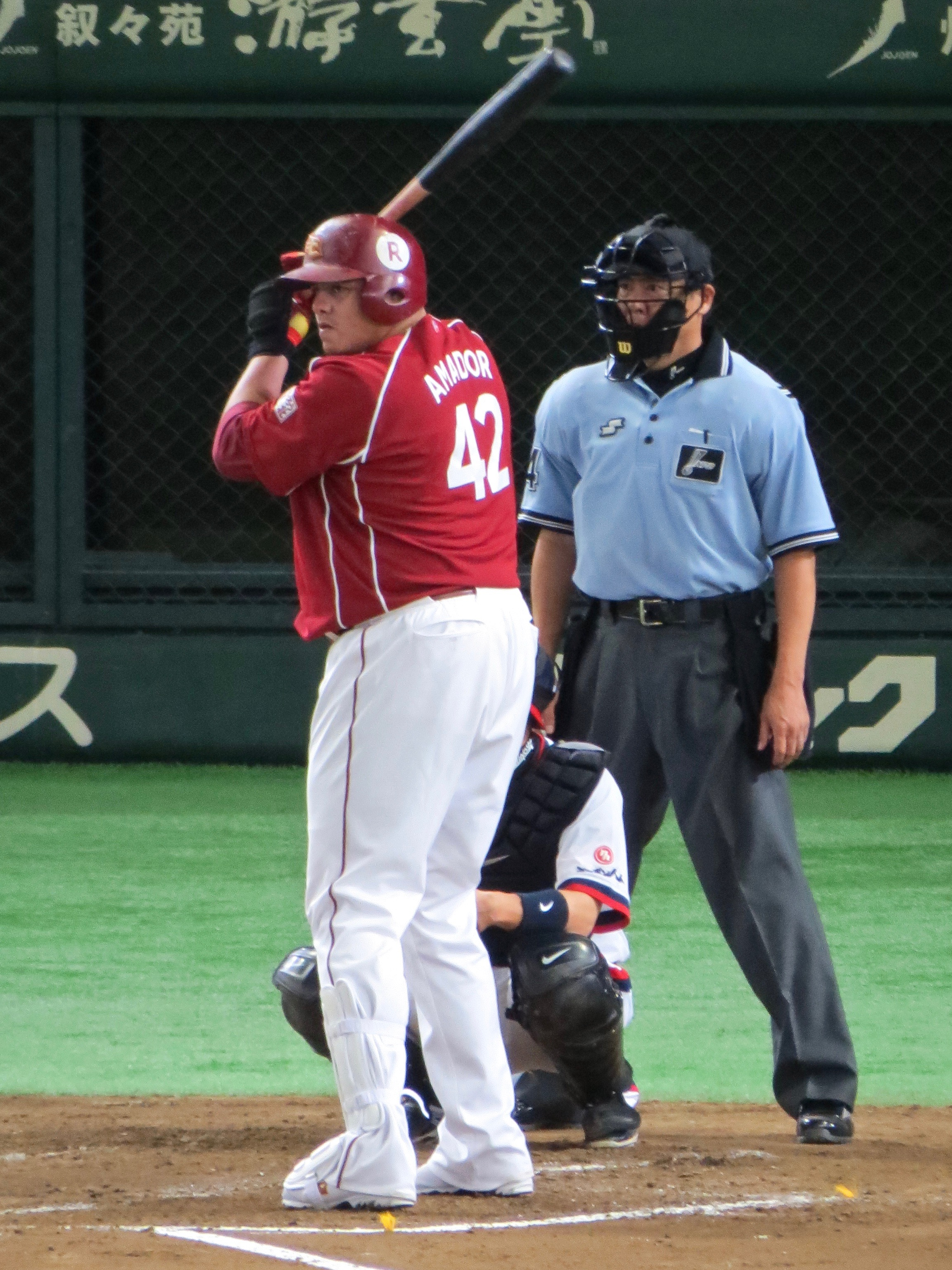
- Amador in 2016 with the Rakuten Eagles

Piratas de Campeche – No. 85
- First baseman / Designated hitter
- Born: January 19, 1987 (age 39); Mulegé, Baja California Sur, Mexico
- Bats: Right Throws: Right

NPB debut
- May 25, 2016, for the Tohoku Rakuten Golden Eagles

NPB statistics (through 2018 season)
- Batting average: .250
- Home runs: 52
- Runs batted in: 126
- Stats at Baseball Reference

Teams
- Tohoku Rakuten Golden Eagles (2016–2018)

Japhet Isidro Amador Hernandez (born January 19, 1987), nicknamed "El Gigante de Mulegé", is a Mexican professional baseball first baseman and designated hitter for the Piratas de Campeche of the Mexican League. He has previously played in Nippon Professional Baseball (NPB) for the Tohoku Rakuten Golden Eagles.

== Career ==
=== Diablos Rojos del Mexico ===
Amador was born in Mulegé, Baja California Sur. From 2007 through a portion of the 2013 season, Amador played in the Mexican League, for the Petroleros de Minatitlán, Rojos del Águila de Veracruz and Diablos Rojos del México. In 2012, he hit 15 home runs through 81 Mexican League games; he hit 17 home runs in 61 games that year during winter baseball in the Mexican Pacific League. In 104 games for the Diablos Rojos in 2013, Amador hit .368 with 36 home runs and 121 runs batted in (RBI).

=== Houston Astros ===
On August 18, 2013 the Astros signed him and assigned him to the Triple–A Oklahoma City RedHawks. When the Astros signed him, Amador weighed 330 pounds. He played 10 games for Oklahoma City. The organization then sent him to the Peoria Javelinas of the Arizona Fall League.

In February 2014, the Astros reported that Amador was in Mexico dealing with a family emergency, that he would not be reporting for the beginning of spring training and that they were not sure whether he would report to the Astros at all. Amador reported to camp a couple of weeks late, and reporter Evan Drellich wrote that Amador's pregnant wife had been ill. Drellich said that Amador had hurt his already low chances of playing first base with the Astros.

Amador appeared in seven games with Triple–A Oklahoma City early in the 2014 season.

=== Diablos Rojos del México (second stint) ===
By May, Amador had been returned to the Diablos Rojos on the agreement that he would rejoin the Astros organization when the Mexican League season was finished. He hit 13 home runs that year in 64 games with the Diablos Rojos.

In 2015, Amador led the Mexican League in home runs, hitting 41 during the regular season and earning the league's Most Valuable Player award. He hit 14 more home runs during winter baseball in the Mexican Pacific League.

=== Tohoku Rakuten Golden Eagles ===
On December 24, 2015, Amador signed with the Tohoku Rakuten Golden Eagles of Nippon Professional Baseball (NPB) after the 2015 season.

On May 25, 2016, Amador made his NPB debut. On November 28, 2016, he signed a 1-year extension to remain with the Eagles.

On November 27, 2017, Amador signed a 1-year extension to remain with the Eagles.

On August 9, 2018, Amador was suspended for six months after testing positive for the banned substances chlortalidone and furosemide, but he stated that he would appeal the suspension, and claimed that he would never intentionally take any banned drugs. Leading up to his suspension, Amador had a .269 average and 20 home runs in 62 games played for the club. Amador became a free agent after the season.

=== Diablos Rojos del México (third stint) ===
In 2019, Amador returned to Mexico to play with the Diablos Rojos del México. He hit .346 with 28 home runs and 115 runs batted in that year. Amador did not play in a game in 2020 due to the cancellation of the Mexican League season because of the COVID-19 pandemic. He played for the Charros de Jalisco in the Mexican Pacific Winter League in 2020-21.

In 2021, Amador appeared in 59 games, hitting .314/.407/.586 with 15 home runs and 57 RBI. In 2022, Amador appeared in 73 games, slashing .315/.363/.541 with 17 home runs and 70 RBI.

On April 22, 2023, Amador was the Opening Day first baseman for the Diablos. In the game, Amador helped the club overcome a 0–10 deficit by hitting a walk-off grand slam on a 2–out, 2–strike count. In 78 games, he hit .336/.406/.532 with 15 home runs, 78 RBI and two stolen bases.

In 2024, Amador appeared in 39 games, hitting .234/.318/.390 with six home runs and 33 RBI. With the team, he won the Serie del Rey.

Amador made 27 appearances in his sixth season for México in 2026, hitting .281/.407/.472 with four home runs, 14 RBI, and one stolen base.

=== Piratas de Campeche ===
On May 17, 2026, Amador was loaned to the Piratas de Campeche of the Mexican League for the 2026 season.

== International career ==
Amador was selected for Mexico national baseball team at the exhibition games against Japan in 2016 and 2017 World Baseball Classic.

On October 16, 2016, he was selected for exhibition games against Japan in 2016.

On February 8, 2017, he was selected for 2017 World Baseball Classic.

== Personal ==
In Mexico, Amador has been given the nickname "El Gigante de Mulegé" (The Giant of Mulegé) due to his 1.93 m height. Only one 300-pound player in baseball history has made the major leagues.
