= Arcenio León =

Venezuelan baseball player (born 1986)

- Pitcher
- Born: September 22, 1986 (age 39); Maracaibo, Venezuela
- Batted: Right Threw: Right

MLB debut
- May 28, 2017, for the Detroit Tigers

Last MLB appearance
- June 10, 2017, for the Detroit Tigers

MLB statistics
- Win–loss record: 0–0
- Earned run average: 12.15
- Strikeouts: 2
- Stats at Baseball Reference

Teams
- Detroit Tigers (2017)

Arcenio León (born September 22, 1986) is a Venezuelan former professional baseball pitcher. He played in Major League Baseball (MLB) for the Detroit Tigers in 2017.

== Career ==
=== Houston Astros ===
León signed with the Houston Astros organization as an international free agent in 2005, spending his first two professional seasons with the Venezuelan Summer League Astros. He spent the 2007 and 2008 seasons with the rookie-level Greeneville Astros, logging an 0-7 record and 4.67 ERA with 43 strikeouts in 2007, and registering a 3-1 record and 3.33 ERA with 42 strikeouts in 2008.

León made 41 appearances for the Single-A Lexington Legends in 2009, posting a 4-2 record and 5.86 ERA with 52 strikeouts across 70 2/3 innings pitched. In 44 games split between Lexington and the Double-A Corpus Christi Hooks in 2010, he accumulated a combined 3-4 record and 4.86 ERA with 73 strikeouts and two saves across 66 2/3 innings.

In 2011, León made 48 appearances split between Double-A Corpus Christi and the Triple-A Oklahoma City RedHawks; he posted a 3-4 record and 4.86 ERA with 73 strikeouts and two saves over 66 2/3 innings. León spent the 2012 season with the Double-A Corpus Christi Hooks, with whom he logged a 3-2 record and 4.38 ERA with 58 strikeouts and two saves across 63 2/3 innings pitched.

=== Milwaukee Brewers ===
On November 2, 2012, León was claimed off waivers by the Milwaukee Brewers. On January 7, 2013, León was designated for assignment following the acquisition of Mike Gonzalez. He made 35 appearances (10 starts) for the Double-A Huntsville Stars, logging a 2-7 record and 5.68 ERA with 41 strikeouts across 71 1/3 innings of work.

León split the 2014 campaign between Double-A Huntsville and the Triple-A Nashville Sounds. In 52 relief appearances split between the two affiliates, he posted an aggregate 3-3 record and 3.86 ERA with 61 strikeouts and three saves across 72 1/3 innings pitched.

=== Chicago White Sox ===
On November 25, 2014, León signed a minor league contract with the Chicago White Sox organization. In nine appearances for the Triple-A Charlotte Knights, he struggled to an 11.91 ERA with 12 strikeouts across 11 1/3 innings pitched. Partway through the year, León lost sensation in his hand, requiring surgery. He elected free agency following the season on November 7, 2015.

=== Acereros de Monclova ===
On February 17, 2016, León signed with the Acereros de Monclova of the Mexican League. In 60 appearances out of the bullpen for Monclova, León compiled a 5-4 record and 3.30 ERA with 53 strikeouts and 36 saves across 62 2/3 innings pitched.

=== Detroit Tigers ===
On October 21, 2016, León signed a minor league contract with the Detroit Tigers organization. He pitched for the Venezuelan national baseball team in the 2017 World Baseball Classic. León began the 2017 season with the Toledo Mud Hens of the Triple-A International League. León posted a 3.15 earned run average in 21 appearances for Toledo before the Tigers purchased his contract on May 27. He made his major league debut the following day. The Tigers optioned León back to Toledo on June 11. In six appearances for Detroit during his rookie campaign, he struggled to a 12.15 ERA with two strikeouts over 6 2/3 innings pitched. On September 11, León was placed on release waivers by the Tigers.

=== Guerreros de Oaxaca ===
On January 29, 2018, León signed with the Guerreros de Oaxaca of the Mexican League. In 22 appearances for Oaxaca, he posted a 2-2 record and 4.98 ERA with 24 strikeouts and 10 saves across 21 2/3 innings pitched. León was released by the Guerreros on July 3.

=== Leones de Yucatán ===
On August 13, 2018, León signed with the Leones de Yucatán of the Mexican League. In 11 outings for Yucatán, he recorded a 3.12 ERA with six strikeouts and two saves across 8 2/3 innings pitched. León became a free agent following the season.

=== Piratas de Campeche ===
On February 19, 2019, León signed with the Piratas de Campeche of the Mexican League. In 18 appearances for Campeche, he registered a 1-1 record and 4.42 ERA with 19 strikeouts and seven saves across 18 1/3 innings pitched. León was released by the Piratas on May 27.

=== West Virginia Power ===
On March 5, 2021, León signed with the West Virginia Power of the Atlantic League of Professional Baseball. In 11 appearances, he posted a 1–0 record and 3.55 ERA with seven strikeouts and three saves over 12 2/3 innings pitched. León was released by West Virginia on August 28.
