= Yoanner Negrín =

Cuban baseball player (born 1984)

Leones de Yucatán – No. 25
- Pitcher
- Born: April 29, 1984 (age 42); Havana, Cuba
- Bats: Right Throws: Right
- Stats at Baseball Reference
Medals
Men's baseball
Representing Mexico
Central American and Caribbean Games
Gold medal – first place	2023 San Salvador	Team

Yoanner Negrín Perez (born April 29, 1984) is a professional baseball pitcher for the Leones de Yucatán of the Mexican League. He was signed by the Chicago Cubs as an undrafted free agent on July 25, 2011, and began his professional career with the Arizona League Cubs. In 2012, he spent most of the season on loan to the Mexican League and pitched in 24 games (with 16 starts) for the Olmecas de Tabasco. He played for the Spain national baseball team in the 2013 World Baseball Classic.

== Career ==
=== Chicago Cubs ===
On July 25, 2011, Negrín signed with the Chicago Cubs as an undrafted free agent and began his career with the Arizona League Cubs. He began the 2012 season with the Daytona Cubs, but was loaned to the Olmecas de Tabasco with whom he pitched in 24 games (and posted a 7–6 record and 3.12 ERA), before being returned to the Cubs organization.

Negrín spent the majority of the next three seasons playing for the Triple–A Iowa Cubs. Cumulatively, he made 75 appearances for Iowa and registered a 6–11 record and 4.28 ERA with 204 strikeouts and 2 saves in 212 1/3 innings pitched.

=== Leones de Yucatán ===
On June 23, 2015, Negrín was loaned to the Leones de Yucatán. Negrín did not play in a game in 2020 due to the cancellation of the Mexican League season because of the COVID-19 pandemic.

In 2022, he appeared in 18 games (17 starts) for Yucatán, but struggled to a 4-4 record and 6.78 ERA with 51 strikeouts in 82 1/3 innings pitched. Negrín won the Mexican League Championship with the Leones in 2022.

On 24 July 2025, the Leones retired Negrín's number 25.

== International career ==
Negrín was selected to represent Spain at the 2023 World Baseball Classic qualification.

In June 2023, Negrín represented Mexico at the 2023 Central American and Caribbean Games, where the team won the gold medal.
