= 2015 Mexican Baseball League season =

2015 Mexican League season
- League: Mexican League
- Sport: Baseball
- Duration: April 3 – September 14
- Teams: 16

Serie del Rey
- Champions: Tigres de Quintana Roo
- Runners-up: Acereros de Monclova
- Finals MVP: Alfredo Amézaga

LMB seasons
- ← 2014 2016 →

The 2015 Mexican League season was the 91st season in the history of the Mexican League. It was contested by 16 teams, evenly divided into North and South zones. The season started on 3 April and ended on 14 September with the last game of the Serie del Rey, where Tigres de Quintana Roo defeated Acereros de Monclova to win the championship.

This season marked the Mexican League's 90th anniversary. To celebrate it, the league presented a commemorative logo and slogan: 90 años, historia imparable (90 years, unstoppable story).

== Standings ==
North
Rank	Team	W	L	Pct.	GB	STK
1	Diablos Rojos del México	73	39	.652	—	W1
2	Acereros de Monclova	59	51	.536	13.0	W3
3	Saraperos de Saltillo	57	52	.523	14.5	L2
4	Toros de Tijuana	54	53	.505	16.5	L1
5	Vaqueros de la Laguna	55	57	.491	18.0	L2
6	Rieleros de Aguascalientes	55	58	.487	18.5	W2
7	Sultanes de Monterrey	51	62	.451	22.5	W2
8	Broncos de Tamaulipas	44	69	.389	29.5	L5

South
Rank	Team	W	L	Pct.	GB	STK
1	Leones de Yucatán	66	46	.589	—	L1
2	Tigres de Quintana Roo	64	47	.577	1.5	W1
3	Guerreros de Oaxaca	55	57	.491	11.0	W1
4	Piratas de Campeche	53	56	.486	11.5	W1
5	Delfines de Ciudad del Carmen	52	59	.468	13.5	L1
6	Pericos de Puebla	51	58	.468	13.5	L1
7	Olmecas de Tabasco	52	60	.464	14.0	L1
8	Rojos del Águila de Veracruz	48	65	.425	18.5	W1

== Postseason ==
Wild Card games
8	Toros de Tijuana	1
9	Vaqueros de la Laguna	0
7	Piratas de Campeche	1
10	Pericos de Puebla	0

First stage
1	Diablos Rojos del México	3
4	Toros de Tijuana	4
North
4	Acereros de Monclova	4
5	Saraperos de Saltillo	3
2	Leones de Yucatán	4
4	Piratas de Campeche	3
South
3	Tigres de Quintana Roo	4
6	Guerreros de Oaxaca	3

Championship Series
4	Toros de Tijuana	3
2	Acereros de Monclova	4
1	Leones de Yucatán	3
2	Tigres de Quintana Roo	4

Serie del Rey
N2	Acereros de Monclova	1
S2	Tigres de Quintana Roo	4

== League leaders ==
Batting leaders
Stat	Player	Team	Total
AVG	(Dominican Republic) Jesús Valdez	Leones de Yucatán	.363
HR	(Mexico) Japhet Amador	Diablos Rojos del México	41
RBI	(Mexico) Japhet Amador	Diablos Rojos del México	117
R	(United States) Corey Wimberly	Leones de Yucatán	97
H	(Dominican Republic) Olmo Rosario	Acereros de Monclova	152
SB	(Dominican Republic) Jeremías Pineda	Rojos del Águila de Veracruz	60
SLG	(Mexico) Japhet Amador	Diablos Rojos del México	.742

Pitching leaders
Stat	Player	Team	Total
ERA	(Venezuela) Edgmer Escalona	Saraperos de Saltillo	2.54
W	(Mexico) Marco Duarte	Diablos Rojos del México	13
W	(United States) Josh Lowey	Acereros de Monclova	13
SV	(Dominican Republic) Tony Peña Jr.	Vaqueros de la Laguna	25
IP	(Dominican Republic) César Valdez	Olmecas de Tabasco	160.2
K	(Dominican Republic) César Valdez	Olmecas de Tabasco	161
WHIP	(Dominican Republic) César Valdez	Olmecas de Tabasco	1.08
WHIP	(Venezuela) Edgmer Escalona	Saraperos de Saltillo	1.08

== Managerial changes ==
=== Offseason ===
Team	Former manager	Reason for leaving	New manager	Ref.
Sultanes de Monterrey	(Mexico) Miguel Flores		(United States) Derek Bryant	
Leones de Yucatán	(Puerto Rico) Orlando Sánchez		(Venezuela) Willie Romero	

=== In season ===
Team	Former manager	Interim manager	Reason for leaving	New manager	Ref.
Sultanes de Monterrey	(United States) Derek Bryant	(Mexico) Antonio Aguilera	Fired	(Venezuela) Lino Connell	
Sultanes de Monterrey	(Venezuela) Lino Connell	N/A	Assigned as bench coach	(Dominican Republic) Félix Fermín	

== Awards ==
LMB Awards
Award	Player	Team	Ref.
Most Valuable Player	(Mexico) Japhet Amador	Diablos Rojos del México	
Rookie of the Year	(Mexico) Manuel Rodríguez	Leones de Yucatán	
Best Pitcher	(United States) Josh Lowey	Acereros de Monclova	
Best Relief Pitcher	(Dominican Republic) Tony Peña Jr.	Vaqueros de la Laguna	
Manager of the Year	(Venezuela) Willie Romero	Leones de Yucatán	
