= Homar Rojas =

Mexican baseball player and manager

Conspiradores de Querétaro
- Catcher / Manager
- Born: 16 February 1964 (age 62); Santiago, Nuevo León, Mexico
- Bats: Right Throws: Right

LMB statistics
- Batting average: .291
- Hits: 1,548
- Home runs: 141
- Runs batted in: 923
- Stats at Baseball Reference

Homar Rojas Villarreal (born 16 February 1964) is a Mexican professional baseball manager and former catcher who currently serves as the bench coach of the Conspiradores de Querétaro of the Mexican League. He batted and threw right-handed.

Rojas spent 23 years in the minor leagues as a catcher before becoming a manager. From 1982 through 2004, he played for nine different teams both in the Mexican Baseball and Mexican Pacific leagues. A fine defensive catcher and good-contact hitter, he batted .300 or more nine times and hit 150 home runs, while collecting a career .291 batting average. His most productive season came in 1998, when he posted career-highs in average (.352) and RBI (92).

Following his playing career, Rojas has managed both in the LMB (2005–2006) and LMP (2007–08).

== Playing career ==
LMB

1982–1983	Sultanes de Monterrey
1984–1986	Tigres de México
1991–1992	Tigres de México
1992–1993	Industriales de Monterrey
1994–1996	Diablos Rojos del México
1997	Leones de Yucatán
1998–2004	Guerreros de Oaxaca
LMP
1988-89	Naranjeros de Hermosillo
1990-91	Naranjeros de Hermosillo
1996-97	Mayos de Navojoa
1998-99	Yaquis de Obregón
2000-01	Yaquis de Obregón
2001-02	Yaquis de Obregón
Minor leagues
1987	Bakersfield Dodgers
1988	Vero Beach Dodgers
1989	Albuquerque Dukes
1989–1990	San Antonio Missions

== Managerial career ==
2005–2006	Guerreros de Oaxaca
2007-08	Yaquis de Obregón *
2009	Broncos de Reynosa *
2009–2010	Naranjeros de Hermosillo
2017–2018	Rieleros de Aguascalientes
2019–2021	Sultanes de Monterrey (LMP)
2021	Sultanes de Monterrey (LMB)
2021–2023	Toros de Tijuana
2024–2025	Acereros de Monclova
2026	Dorados de Chihuahua

- Led the Yaquis to the 2007-08 LMP title for their first pennant in 27 years of franchise history.

On 16 June 2025, Rojas was fired as manager for the Acereros de Monclova.

On 30 September 2025, Rojas was hired to serve as the manager of the Dorados de Chihuahua following the firing of Luis Rivera.

On 10 November 2026, Rojas was hired as bench coach for the Conspiradores de Querétaro of the Mexican League.
