= Carlos Gastélum =

Mexican baseball player (born 1979)

Acereros de Monclova – No. 5
- Infielder / Coach / Manager
- Born: 29 October 1979 (age 46); Huatabampo, Sonora, Mexico
- Bats: Right Throws: Right
- Stats at Baseball Reference

Career highlights and awards
- Mexican League Rookie of the Year Award (2002)

Carlos Alberto "El Chispa" Gastélum (Spanish pronunciation: [ˈkaɾlos alˈβeɾto el ˈtʃispa ɣasˈtelun]; born 29 October 1979) is a Mexican former professional baseball infielder who currently serves as the third base coach for the Acereros de Monclova of the Mexican League. He played for the Naranjeros de Hermosillo, as well as Venados de Mazatlán in the Mexican Pacific League in the winter. He started practicing baseball at the age of three years in his native Huatabampo, Sonora in the infancy category of a team called Ibarra Hermanos Ceballos.

== Playing career ==
=== Tigres de Quintana Roo ===
Gastélum joined the Tigres de Quintana Roo of the Mexican League for the 2005 season, and played with the club through the 2018 season. He became a free agent after the 2018 season.

=== Pericos de Puebla ===
On 3 April 2019, he signed with the Pericos de Puebla. In 53 games for Puebla, he hit .278/.337/.385 with three home runs and 20 RBI. On October 4, Gastélum retired from professional baseball.

=== Tigres de Quintana Roo (second stint) ===
On 5 June 2024, Gastélum was activated by Quintana Roo as a player, while still serving as the manager of the club. He appeared in only one game for Quintana Roo, walking in his only plate appearance.

=== Toros de Tijuana ===
On 11 June 2024, Gastélum was traded to the Toros de Tijuana, and was demoted to role of a coach for his new club.

== Managerial and coaching career ==
=== Pericos de Puebla ===
On 7 August 2019, Gastélum was announced as the new manager of the Pericos de Puebla of the Mexican League, replacing Enrique Reyes, in his managerial debut. Gastélum was unable to improve the team’s performance, posting a 6–14 record as the team finished fifth in the South Zone with a 56–60 record, missing the playoffs. He remained with the club through 2020, although the season was canceled due to the COVID-19 pandemic. On 11 July 2021, he was dismissed after a 21–19 start and replaced by Gerardo Sánchez.

=== Toros de Tijuana ===
On 27 December 2022, Gastélum was hired by the Toros de Tijuana to serve as the team's first base coach and base running/defense instructor for the 2023 season.

On 26 July 2024, Gastélum was appointed manager of Tijuana, replacing Dan Firova. He remained on the coaching staff in a non-manager capacity for the 2025 season. On November 9, 2025, Gastélum was fired by the team.

=== Acereros de Monclova ===
On 8 December 2025, Gastélum was hired to serve as the third base coach for the Acereros de Monclova of the Mexican League.
