= Enrique Reyes (baseball) =

Mexican baseball player and manager (born 1962)

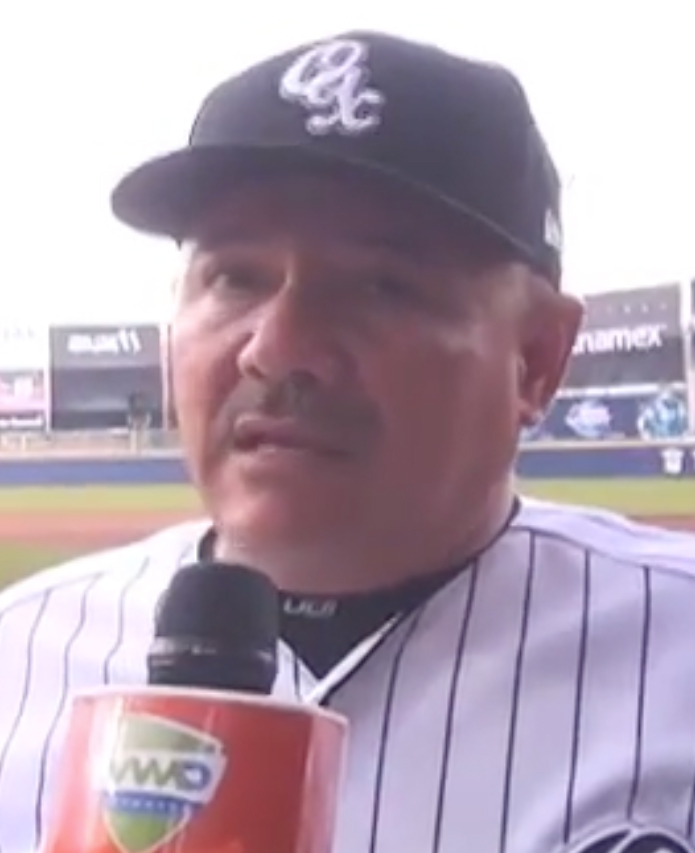
- Reyes in 2016 as manager of the Guerreros de Oaxaca
- Catcher / Manager
- Born: 20 October 1962; Perlas Negras, Veracruz, Mexico
- Bats: Right Throws: Right

LMB statistics
- Batting average: .240
- Hits: 472
- Home runs: 18
- Runs batted in: 196
- Stats at Baseball Reference

Teams
- As player: Tecolotes de Nuevo Laredo / Dos Laredos (1983–1989); Industriales de Monterrey (1990); Rieleros de Aguascalientes (1991–1992); As manager: Rieleros de Aguascalientes (1998–1999); Pericos de Puebla (2000); Tecolotes de los Dos Laredos (2001); Langosteros de Cancún (2002); Pericos de Puebla (2003–2004); Tigres de la Angelópolis / Quintana Roo (2005–2008); Rojos del Águila de Veracruz (2009); Olmecas de Tabasco (2010); Sultanes de Monterrey (2011); Rieleros de Aguascalientes (2012–2013); Olmecas de Tabasco (2013–2014); Guerreros de Oaxaca (2015–2016); Olmecas de Tabasco (2016–2017); Rieleros de Aguascalientes (2024); Saraperos de Saltillo (2025); Rieleros de Aguascalientes (2025–2026)

Career highlights and awards
- 3× Mexican League Manager of the Year (2003, 2005, 2012)
Medals
Men's baseball
Manager for Mexico
U-23 Baseball World Cup
Gold medal – first place	2018 Barranquilla	Team
Silver medal – second place	2020 Sonora	Team
Central American and Caribbean Games
Gold medal – first place	2023 San Salvador	Team
Pan American Games
Bronze medal – third place	2023 Santiago	Team

José Enrique Reyes García (born 20 October 1962), nicknamed "Che", is a Mexican professional baseball manager and former catcher. Reyes had a modest playing career, spending nine seasons in the Mexican League, but is better known for his success as a manager. His accomplishments include a Mexican League championship, a gold medal at the 2018 U-23 Baseball World Cup, gold at the 2023 Central American and Caribbean Games and a bronze medal at the 2023 Pan American Games as manager of the Mexico national baseball team.

== Playing career ==
Reyes was born on 20 October 1962 in Perlas Negras in the municipality of Tlalixcoyan, Veracruz. He made his professional debut in the Mexican League in 1983 as a catcher for the Tecolotes de Nuevo Laredo, where he played for seven seasons. In 1990, he joined the Industriales de Monterrey for one season before signing with the Rieleros de Aguascalientes in 1991, where he played until 1992, retiring at the end of the season.

In his Mexican League career, he recorded 472 hits, 169 runs, 18 home runs, 196 RBI with a .240 batting average in 706 games.

== Managerial career ==
=== Mexican League ===
Reyes is one of seven managers in the Mexican League history to surpass 1,000 career victories. He won the 2005 Mexican League championship with the Tigres de la Angelópolis and has been named as Manager of the Year three times: in 2003, 2005 and 2012. He started his managerial career in 1998 with the Rieleros de Aguascalientes leading the team for two seasons before returning for a second stint from 2012 to 2013. In 2000, he took charge of the Pericos de Puebla, later managing them again in 2003 and 2004 and once more in 2019. Reyes also had brief tenures with the Tecolotes de los Dos Laredos in 2001 and the Langosteros de Cancún in 2002.

In 2005, he was appointed manager of the Tigres de la Angelópolis, guiding the team until 2008, during which time the team moved from Puebla to Cancún and changed its name to Tigres de Quintana Roo. He then managed the Rojos del Águila de Veracruz in 2009 before moving on to the Olmecas de Tabasco, where he had multiple stints: 2010, 2013–2014 and 2016–2017. Reyes also managed the Sultanes de Monterrey in 2011 and later took charge of the Guerreros de Oaxaca from 2016 to 2017.

In 2024, Reyes was presented as manager of the Rieleros in his third stint with the team; he was dismissed at the end of the season. On 13 February 2025, Reyes was announced as manager of the Saraperos de Saltillo ahead of the 2025 season. In 2025, Reyes was appointed as manager of the Saraperos de Saltillo; he was fired on 14 May 2025 and replaced by Sergio Omar Gastélum.

On 30 May 2025, Reyes was hired to serve as the manager for the Rieleros de Aguascalientes of the Mexican League, replacing José Amado. On 12 January 2026, he was ratified as manager ahead of the 2026 season. On 7 July Reyes was fired after leading the team to a 29-35 record.

=== Mexico national baseball team ===
In 2018, Reyes was named manager of the Mexico national baseball team for the 2018 Central American and Caribbean Games held in Barranquilla, Colombia, where the Mexican team finished fourth with a 3–4 record, failing to win a medal. In October that same year, Reyes led Mexico to win the 2018 U-23 Baseball World Cup defeating Japan in the final.

Reyes repeated as manager of the Mexican team for the 2020 U-23 Baseball World Cup, held in Sonora, Mexico (postponed to 2021 due to the COVID-19 pandemic), where Mexico won the silver medal after falling to Venezuela in the final. He led the Mexican squad at the 2022 U-23 Baseball World Cup, but the team was unable to replicate its medal-winning finishes from the previous two tournaments, finishing fourth after losing the bronze medal, to Chinese Taipei.

In June 2023, Reyes was appointed manager of the Mexican national team for the 2023 Central American and Caribbean Games, leading them to win the gold medal after finishing the tournament with a 5–1 record. Later that year, he led Mexico to a bronze medal at the 2023 Pan American Games contested in Santiago, Chile, from 18 to 28 October.
