= Josh Lowey =

American baseball player (born 1984)

- Pitcher
- Born: December 16, 1984 (age 41); Fort Walton Beach, Florida
- Batted: Right Threw: Right

KBO debut
- July 19, 2016, for the KT Wiz

Last KBO appearance
- October 5, 2016, for the KT Wiz

KBO statistics
- Win–loss record: 3-6
- Earned run average: 6.30
- Strikeouts: 68
- Stats at Baseball Reference

Teams
- KT Wiz (2016)

Joshua Lowey (born December 16, 1984) is an American former professional baseball pitcher. He played in the KBO League for the KT Wiz. In his career, he also played in the Frontier League, American Association, Atlantic League, and Mexican League.

== Career ==
=== Windy City Thunderbolts ===
Lowey began his career with the Windy City Thunderbolts of the Frontier League in 2008, pitching to a 12.91 ERA in 7 games for the team.

=== River City Rascals ===
The next year, Lowey joined the River City Rascals of the Frontier League, and had a rebound season with a 9-2 record and 2.94 ERA with 75 strikeouts in 101 innings pitched. He continued his success in 2010, registering an 8-5 record and 3.55 ERA in 18 appearances. In 2011, Lowey recorded a 11-2 record and a career-best 2.44 ERA with 114 strikeouts in 129 1/3 innings of work, and won the Pitcher of the Year award.

=== Wichita Wingnuts ===
Lowey joined the Wichita Wingnuts of the American Association of Independent Professional Baseball for the 2012 season. In 23 appearances for Wichita, Lowey pitched to a 3.57 ERA and 15-4 record with 96 strikeouts on the year. His 15 wins set the leagues wins record and he won the Pitcher of the Year award.

=== Somerset Patriots ===
On March 25, 2013, Lowey signed with the Somerset Patriots of the Atlantic League of Professional Baseball. In 2013 for Somerset, Lowey led the Atlantic League with a 2.89 ERA and led the team with 14 victories. On March 26, 2014, Lowey re-signed with the Patriots for the 2014 season.

=== Acereros de Monclova ===
On April 29, 2014, Lowey signed with the Acereros de Monclova of the Mexican League. In 2015 for the Acereros, Lowey finished with a 13-6 record, the second-best in the league, and a 3.03 ERA, the fourth-best in the league. He finished second in the league in strikeouts with 145 in 142 2/3 innings pitched, earned the Top Pitcher of the Year award and was an LMB All-Star. On February 12, 2016, Lowey re-signed with the Acereros. In 16 games for Monclova in 2016, Lowey registered a stellar 1.65 ERA and a 13-3 record with 131 strikeouts. On July 8, 2016, Lowey was released by Monclova so he could pursue an opportunity in Korea.

=== KT Wiz ===
On July 8, 2016, Lowey signed a $220,000 contract with the KT Wiz of the KBO League for the second half of the 2016 season. In 14 games for the club, Lowey pitched to a 3-6 record and a 6.30 ERA with 68 strikeouts.

=== Acereros de Monclova (second stint) ===
On January 10, 2017, Lowey re-signed with the Acereros de Monclova for the 2017 season. On the year, Lowey pitched to a 8-5 record and a 2.69 ERA with 146 strikeouts in 127 innings of work, and was a LMB All-Star. In 2018, Lowey was a LMB All-Star and won the Pitcher of the Year award after recording a 14-5 record and 3.12 ERA. On July 1, 2019, Lowey suffered a knee injury in a game against the Piratas de Campeche, and missed the rest of the 2019 season after undergoing surgery. In his 9 games with Monclova in 2019, Lowey recorded a 3.91 ERA and 8-0 record with 55 strikeouts in 53 innings of work. Lowey did not play in a game for Monclova in 2020 due to the cancellation of the 2020 LMB season because of the COVID-19 pandemic.

On April 28, 2021, Lowey announced he would not pitch for the Acereros in the 2021 season due to concerns over the ongoing COVID-19 pandemic. On July 6, 2022, after several years of inactivity, Lowey re-signed with Monclova. In 6 games (5 starts), he compiled a 4–0 record and 4.37 ERA with 15 strikeouts across 22 2/3 innings.

During his time with Monclova, Lowey racked up 63 victories and maintained a 3.04 ERA, getting selected to 3 All-Star games and winning the Pitcher of the Year award in 2015 and 2018. Due to his success on the mound, he became a fan favorite in Monclova, earning the nickname El Alcalde, or 'The Mayor' in English.
