= Industriales de Monterrey =

Professional baseball team (1990–1994)

- Logo

Information
- League: Mexican League
- Location: Monterrey, Nuevo León
- Ballpark: Estadio de Béisbol Monterrey
- Founded: 1989
- Folded: 1994
- Colors: Black, orange and white

The Industriales de Monterrey (English: Monterrey Industrials) were a professional baseball team based in Monterrey, Nuevo León, the team participated in the Mexican League from 1990 to 1994.

== History ==
The team was established in 1989, when the Charros de Jalisco franchise moved to Monterrey and played in the Estadio de Beisbol Monterrey, which they shared with the Sultanes.

The team also shared the name with the Sultanes' first nickname. The Sultanes were established in 1939 as Carta Blanca, in 1942 they changed its nickname to Industriales and in 1948 the team was renamed to Sultanes. The new team established in 1989 revived the Industriales nickname, which often leads to confusion between the two Monterrey teams.

While playing for the Industriales, Adam Casillas won the 1994 batting title after batting .367.

At the end of the 1994 season the franchise was relocated from Monterrey to Reynosa, Tamaulipas and played the 1995 season as Broncos de Reynosa.

== Season-by-season ==
| Season | League | Finish | Won | Lost | Playoffs | Ref. |
|---|---|---|---|---|---|---|
| 1989 | Mexican League (North) | 7th | 50 | 80 | Did not qualify | |
| 1990 | Mexican League (North) | 6th | 49 | 82 | Did not qualify | |
| 1991 | Mexican League (North) | 3rd | 61 | 56 | Lost North Zone Series (Sultanes), 2–4 | |
| 1992 | Mexican League (North) | 3rd | 69 | 63 | Lost First Stage (Algodoneros), 3–4 | |
| 1993 | Mexican League (North) | 6th | 61 | 67 | Did not qualify | |
| 1994 | Mexican League (North) | 3rd | 74 | 54 | Lost First Stage (Saraperos), 1–4 | |
