= Toros de Tijuana =

Mexican baseball team

Logo
Cap insignia

Information
- League: Mexican Baseball League (North Division)
- Location: Tijuana, Baja California
- Ballpark: Toros Mobil Park
- Founded: 2004, 2014
- Serie del Rey championships: 3 (2017, 2021, 2026)
- Division championships: 4 (2016, 2017, 2021, 2026)
- Colors: Black, red, white
- Mascot: Toro Torín
- Ownership: Alejandro Uribe Herrera
- President: Alberto Uribe Maytorena
- Manager: Roberto Kelly
- Website: www.torosdetijuana.com

The Toros de Tijuana (English: Tijuana Bulls) are a Mexican baseball team based in Tijuana, Mexico, that competes in the Mexican Baseball League. The team plays its home games at Toros Mobil Park.

== Team history ==
=== Original attempt ===
The franchise was originally the Tecolotes de los Dos Laredos before moving to Tijuana to become the Toros de Tijuana in 2004. In their debut season they qualified for the postseason where they faced and defeated the Sultanes de Monterrey. In the second round of playoffs they were defeated by the Pericos de Puebla in five games.

The Mexican League reportedly stripped the Toros owner of the franchise and gave it to new owners, who renamed that team the Potros de Tijuana after the original Tijuana team that played in Mexican Pacific League from 1977 to 1991. The Toros ownership kept the team name, logo, uniforms, and history as a result of the alleged political wrangling that went on in that league. The original ownership group in Mexico was slated to bring the team to the independent Golden Baseball League in 2005, but could not come to a stadium deal in Tijuana. A ballpark was said to be ready in Chula Vista, California, near San Diego, should the team have decided to come to the league. Had they joined the league, they would've not only been the league's first team based outside of the United States (that honor instead went to the travelling Japan Samurai Bears), but they would have also been the only privately owned team at the time.

The Potros clinched a playoff berth in 2005. They eliminated the Acereros de Monclova in 5 games in the first round of the playoffs. In the second round they would face the Diablos Rojas del Mexico to beat them in 6 games to go on to their first zone final, where they would face the Saraperos de Saltillo who won the championship in 7 games. In 2006 they would be eliminated in the first by the Sultanes de Monterrey. The 2008 season would be the last in the LMB, they would finish with a 41–61 record to finish sixth place in the North Division. The team would move to the city of Reynosa to become the Broncos de Reynosa.

=== Second attempt ===
The Toros de Tijuana rejoined the LMB in 2014 by acquiring the Petroleros de Minatitlán franchise. This season they would finish in sixth place in the North Division with a record of 55–58. In the 2015 season they would finish in fourth place, and the Toros had to play an elimination game against the Vaqueros Laguna for a Wild Card spot. The game was held at the home where the Toros prevailed 10–3. In the first round of the playoffs they would defeat Diablos Rojos del México in 7 games. In their second division final they would fall to the Acereros de Monclova in 7 games.

In 2016 they classified again for the postseason by finishing in third place in the North Zone, in the first round of playoffs they eliminated the Acereros de Monclova in 4 games to reach the North Final for the second consecutive year where they eliminated in 7 games the Sultanes de Monterrey, in order to reach his first Serie del Rey in the history of the team where he faced the Pericos de Puebla with whom they lost in 6 games.

=== LMB champions and onward ===
In the 2017 season, the Toros, led by Pedro Meré, finished in first place in the North Division. In the first round of the playoffs, they defeated the Rieleros de Aguascalientes in six games to advance to the North Division Final, where they defeated the Sultanes de Monterrey on the road. The Toros then defeated the Pericos de Puebla in Serie del Rey in five games to win their first title in the Mexican Baseball League and raise the Zaachila Cup. The Most Valuable Player trophy went to Roberto López, who in the Serie del Rey had six RBIs, batted .429, and was effective defensively in left field.

In the Spring 2018 season, the Toros qualified for the postseason by finishing in second place. They eliminated the Rieleros de Aguascalientes in four games to go to the North Division Final, where they were eliminated by the Sultanes de Monterrey. In the Fall 2018 season, they finished in second place again but were eliminated again by the Sultanes de Monterrey in seven games of the first round of playoffs. In 2019, they finished in first place in the North Division. In the first round of playoffs, they defeated the Saraperos de Saltillo to advance to the North Division Final, where they fell to the Acereros de Monclova.

The Toros won their second league title in team history on September 15, 2021. They defeated the Leones de Yucatán in seven games. It marked the second time in league history a team came back from down three games to zero in the Serie del Rey.

=== 2026 Season ===
In the 2026 season, the Toros de Tijuana will kick off the campaign withe several games scheduled outside of their home arena (Mobil Park), They are aiming to expand their reach and promote the team to new people around the country (Mexico). This organization plans to reach out with fans and the audience based on previous performances. Additionally, the team is planning to incorporate new talent into the lineup by adding new players to the team.

== Roster ==
Toros de Tijuana roster
Players	Coaches/Other
Pitchers: 73 (Venezuela) Adbert Alzolay; 49 (Dominican Republic) Jonathan Aro; -- (Mexico) Andrés Ávila ∞; 45 (United States) Ben Braymer ∞; 46 (Mexico) Rafael Castañeda ∞; 63 (United States) Brett de Geus; 70 (United States) Matt Dermody ∞; 45 (Dominican Republic) Miguel Díaz; 23 (United States) Brady Feigl; 59 (Dominican Republic) Domingo Germán ∞; 11 (United States) Juan Hillman; 65 (United States) Daniel Martínez; 29 (Mexico) Luis Márquez; 18 (Dominican Republic) Adonis Medina; 50 (Mexico) Mario Meza; 35 (United States) Jorge Perez; 40 (Mexico) David Reyes; 16 (Dominican Republic) Enny Romero; 51 (United States) Florencio Serrano; 32 (Canada) Noah Skirrow; 22 (United States) Teddy Stankiewicz ∞; 36 (United States) Randy Wynne ∞; 61 (Dominican Republic) Aneurys Zabala ∞; Catchers: 60 (Mexico) Luis Amador; 4 (Mexico) Alí Solís; 20 (Venezuela) Tomás Telis; Infielders: 26 (United States) Phillip Evans; 58 (Mexico) Abraham Favela; 41 (Venezuela) Wilmer Flores; 7 (Dominican Republic) Jonathan Guzmán; 25 (United States) Jack Mayfield; 14 (Venezuela) Hernán Pérez; 74 (Mexico) Isaac Rodríguez; 10 (United States) Justin Turner; Outfielders: 2 (Dominican Republic) Gilberto Celestino; 38 (Dominican Republic) Franchy Cordero; 99 (Mexico) Edson García; 27 (Dominican Republic) Junior Lake; 43 (Mexico) Francisco Lugo; 5 (Venezuela) Rafael Ortega ∞	Manager: 39 (Panama) Roberto Kelly; Coaches: -- (Cuba) Reinaldo Batista (first base); 9 (Venezuela) Carlos Hernández (catchers); -- (Venezuela) César Izturis (bench); -- (United States) Ryan Long (hitting); -- (United States) Doug Mathis (pitching); 24 (Mexico) Vicente Romo (bullpen); -- (Mexico) Gerardo Sánchez (third base); 16 (Mexico) Alonso Téllez (assistant hitting); 1 (Venezuela) Luis Ugueto (first base); 7-day injured list; ~ Development list; # Rehab assignment; ∞ Reserve list; ‡ Restricted list; § Suspended list; † Temporarily inactive list; Roster updated October 1, 2026; Transactions; → More rosters: MiLB • Mexican League

== Championships ==
Season	Manager	Opponent	Series score	Record
2017	Pedro Meré	Pericos de Puebla	4–1	88–39
2021	Homar Rojas	Leones de Yucatán	4–3	56–34
Total championships			2	

== See also ==
- Potros de Tijuana (Mexican League team)
- Tijuana Cimarrones (Golden Baseball League team)
