= List of Piratas de Campeche seasons =

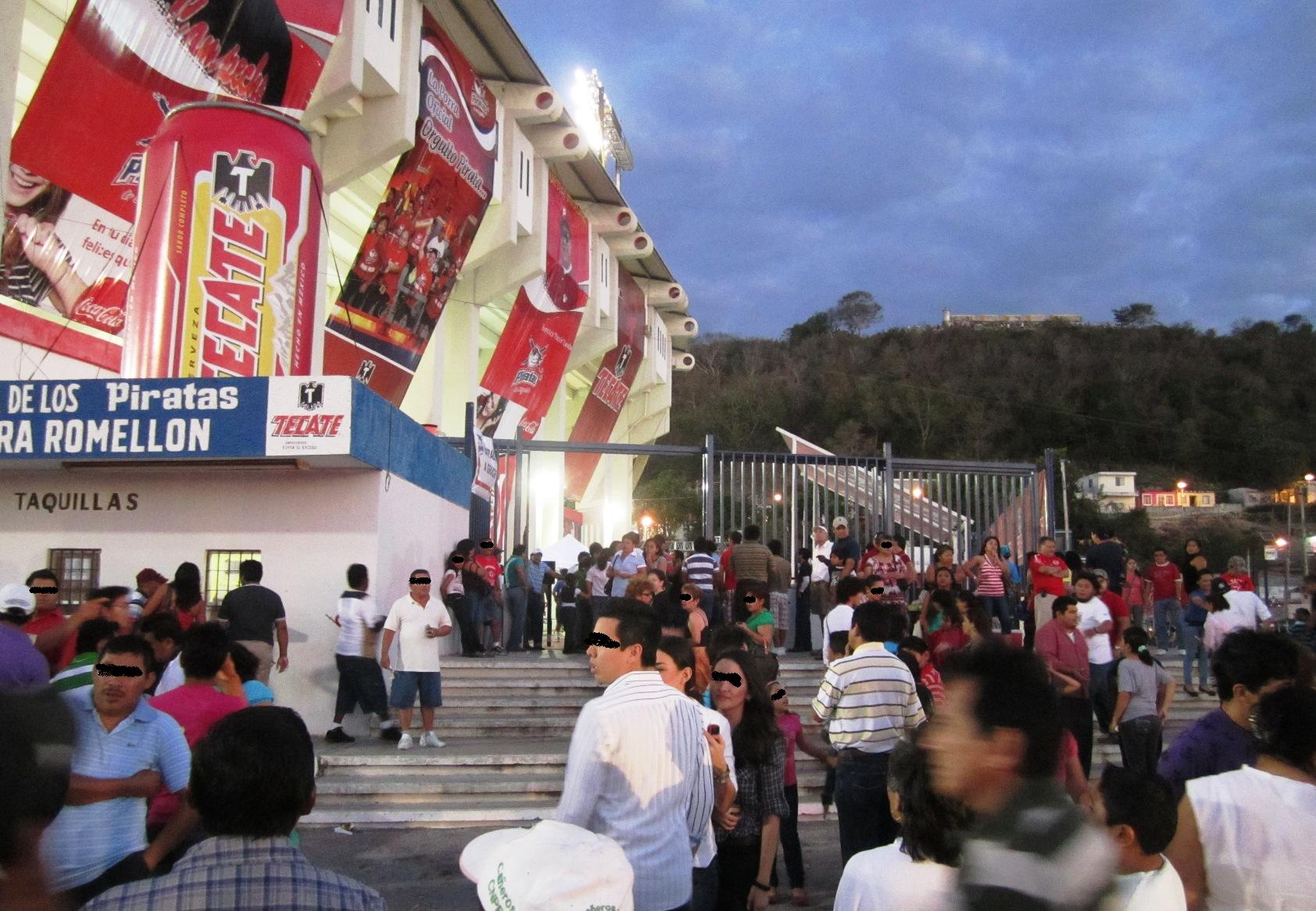
Estadio Nelson Barrera, home of the Piratas de Campeche since 2001

The Piratas de Campeche are a Mexican League (LMB) baseball team based in Campeche, Campeche. The team joined the league in 1980, after the Alacranes de Durango franchise relocated from Durango to Campeche. The Piratas made their debut on 14 March 1980 against the Plataneros de Tabasco, losing 2–5 at the Venustiano Carranza Stadium. Their first victory came on 16 March 1980 in the third game of the series against Tabasco, with Maximino León as the winning pitcher. Jerry Hairston Sr. served as the team's player-manager.

The team has won the Mexican League championship twice. The first in 1983 under player-manager Francisco Estrada after defeating the Indios de Ciudad Juárez in the final series 4 games to 3. The second in 2004, again with Estrada as manager, defeating the Saraperos de Saltillo in five games 4–1.

From 1980 to 1997, the Piratas de Campeche played in the Estadio Venustiano Carranza. The stadium was demolished after that year and the team moved to the Parque Leandro Domínguez, where they played from 1998 to 2000. Since 2001, the Piratas de Campeche have played in the Estadio Nelson Barrera, which was built on the former site of the Estadio Venustiano Carranza.

== Season-by-season ==
Season	League	Division	Regular season					Postseason			Ref.
Season	League	Division	Finish	Wins	Losses	Pct.	GB	Wins	Losses	Result	Ref.
1980	LMB	South	5th	45	43	.511	18.0	Season cancelled^{[a]}			
1981	LMB	South	2nd	71	50	.587	3.5	7	5	Lost division championship (México) 3–4	
1982	LMB	South	7th	55	70	.440	23.5	Did not qualify			
1983	LMB	South	2nd	70	44	.614	5.5	17^{[b]}	8	Won Final Series (Juárez) 4–3	
1984	LMB	South	8th	37	72	.339	34.5	Did not qualify			
1985	LMB	South	6th	58	60	.492	15.0	Did not qualify			
1986	LMB	South	3rd	70	57	.551	17.0	2	4	Lost first round (Tigres) 2–4	
1987	LMB	South	5th	58	57	.504	12.5	Did not qualify			
1988	LMB	South	6th	62	65	.488	20.0	Did not qualify			
1989	LMB	South	1st	75	52	.591	–	6	4	Lost division championship (Yucatán) 2–4	
1990	LMB	South	4th	66	57	.537	7.0	6	6	Lost division championship (León) 2–4	
1991	LMB	South	3rd	70	50	.583	5.0	1	4	Lost first round (León) 1–4	
1992	LMB	South	5th	64	64	.500	12.0	Did not qualify			
1993	LMB	South	8th	49	74	.398	29.5	Did not qualify			
1994	LMB	South	4th	64	57	.529	15.0	3	4	Lost first round (Veracruz) 3–4	
1995	LMB	South	4th	60	55	.526	20.6	2	4	Lost first round (México) 2–4	
1996	LMB	South	2nd	53	59	.473	4.0	1	4	Lost first round (Yucatán) 1–4	
1997	LMB	South	4th	46	64	.418	16.5	Did not qualify			
1998	LMB	South	5th	47	73	.392	19.0	Did not qualify			
1999	LMB	South	2nd	58	60	.492	4.0	Did not qualify			
2000	LMB	South	4th	59	60	.496	9.0	Did not qualify			
2001	LMB	South	2nd	62	56	.525	4.5	2	4	Lost first round (Tigres) 2–4	
2002	LMB	South	6th	52	55	.486	10.0	Did not qualify			
2003	LMB	South	4th	55	51	.519	16.5	2	4	Lost first round (Tigres) 2–4	
2004	LMB	South	2nd	55	42	.567	3.5	16	6	Won Final Series (Saltillo) 4–1	
2005	LMB	South	2nd	62	43	.590	3.0	3	4	Lost first round (Tabasco) 3–4	
2006	LMB	South	6th	47	61	.435	20.0	Did not qualify			
2007	LMB	South	6th	46	62	.426	22.0	Did not qualify			
2008	LMB	South	4th	58	49	.542	9.0	0	4	Lost first round (México) 0–4	
2009	LMB	South	4th	56	51	.523	15.0	3	4	Lost first round (Tigres) 3–4	
2010	LMB	South^{[c]}	5th	52	50	.510	12.5	Did not qualify			
2011	LMB	South	2nd	55	45	.550	4.5	3	4	Lost first round (Veracruz) 3–4	
2012	LMB	South	5th	51	60	.459	18.5	Did not qualify			
2013	LMB	South	7th	47	63	.427	16.5	Did not qualify			
2014	LMB	South	3rd	56	53	.514	7.0	3	4	Lost first round (Puebla) 3–4	
2015	LMB	South	4th	53	56	.486	11.5	4	4	Lost first round (Yucatán) 3–4	
2016	LMB	South	4th	57	51	.528	19.0	2	4	Lost first round (Yucatán) 2–4	
2017	LMB	South	6th	43	63	.406	20.5	Did not qualify			
2018^{[d]}	LMB	South	7th	22	34	.393	17.5	Did not qualify			
2018^{[d]}	LMB	South	6th	25	32	.439	7.5	Did not qualify			
2019	LMB	South	6th	47	68	.409	19.5	Did not qualify			
2020	Canceled due to the COVID-19 pandemic										
2021	LMB	South	8th	24	39	.381	16.5	Did not qualify			
2022	LMB	South	8th	29	58	.333	22.5	Did not qualify			
2023	LMB	South	9th	31	57	.352	24.5	Did not qualify			
2024	LMB	South	9th	32	55	.368	37.5	Did not qualify			
2025	LMB	South	3rd	47	43	.522	17.0	10	9	Lost championship series (México) 2–4	

== Notes ==
- ^{a} The 1980 season was canceled due to the 1980 Mexican baseball players' strike. An extraordinary tournament was played that same year, but Campeche did not participate.
- ^{b} The postseason format for the 1983 season was somewhat unusual: instead of the traditional knockout stage, the top four teams from each division played a round-robin tournament, with the winner of each advancing to the final series.
- ^{c} For the 2010 season, in commemoration of the Mexican bicentennial, the South Division was renamed the Hidalgo Division in honor of Miguel Hidalgo.
- ^{d} The 2018 season was contested in a two-tournament format known as Spring and Autumn.
