= Houston Jiménez =

Mexican baseball player (born 1957)

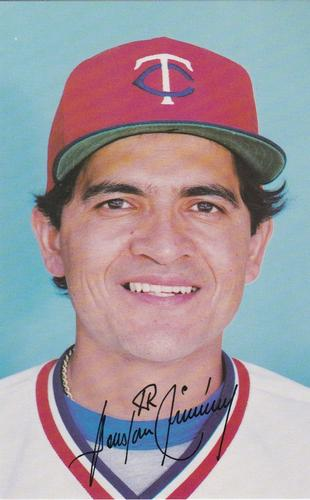
- Jiménez with the Minnesota Twins in 1984
- Shortstop / Coach
- Born: 30 October 1957 (age 68); Mexico City, Mexico
- Batted: Right Threw: Right

MLB debut
- June 13, 1983, for the Minnesota Twins

Last MLB appearance
- September 12, 1988, for the Cleveland Indians

MLB statistics
- Batting average: .185
- Home runs: 0
- Runs batted in: 29
- Stats at Baseball Reference

Teams
- Minnesota Twins (1983–1984); Pittsburgh Pirates (1987); Cleveland Indians (1988)

Career highlights and awards
- Mexican League Rookie of the Year (1976)

Member of the Mexican Professional

Baseball Hall of Fame
- Induction: 2007

Alfonso "Houston" Jiménez González (born 30 October 1957) is a Mexican former professional baseball shortstop. Jiménez played in Major League Baseball (MLB) from 1983 to 1988 for the Minnesota Twins, Pittsburgh Pirates, and Cleveland Indians.

Jiménez spent 14 seasons playing in the Mexican League and 25 seasons in the Mexican Pacific League. He was inducted into the Mexican Professional Baseball Hall of Fame as part of the class of 2007.

== Playing career ==
=== Early years ===
Jiménez began his playing career with Puebla in 1974 at the age of 16. In 1975, he was signed as a free agent by the Chicago Cubs organization, where he played for the Key West Cubs. After batting just .215 as their regular shortstop, he returned to Pericos for two seasons. He had a brief trial with the Chicago White Sox organization in 1978, batting .220 in 13 games.

=== Twins ===
After two more seasons with Puebla, Jiménez signed with the Minnesota Twins before the 1981 season. At the end of spring training, he was purchased by the Broncos de Reynosa. After spending a season and a half with Reynosa, he was reacquired by the Twins, finishing the season with the Toledo Mud Hens.

Jiménez started 1983 with the Mud Hens, but was called up to the majors in June. He spent the rest of the season splitting time at shortstop with Ron Washington. The following year, Jiménez became the Twins' starter, playing in 108 games. However, 1984 would prove to be the only full season he spent at the major league level. After batting just .201, he spent all of the 1985 season with Toledo, then was released just before the start of the 1986 season.

=== Pirates and Indians ===
After spending 1986 out of organized ball, Jiménez signed with the Pittsburgh Pirates in December. He spent most of the 1987 season with the Vancouver Canadians, playing in just six games for the Pirates, for whom he went hitless in 7 at bats. He became a free agent after the season.

In June 1988, Jiménez signed with the Cleveland Indians. His experience was similar to the previous year, as he spent most of the season in Triple-A with the Colorado Springs Sky Sox. He appeared in eight games with the Indians, managing just one hit in 21 at-bats.

=== Back to Mexico ===
After spending several years playing winter ball, Jiménez returned to the Mexican League in 1993 with the Saraperos de Saltillo. He played there until his retirement in 2001.

== Coaching career ==
While still active with Saltillo, Jiménez was named the clubs' manager in 1999. After leaving Saltillo in 2001, he managed the Guerreros de Oaxaca from 2002 until 2004. Jiménez managed the Diablos Rojos del México in 2005 and the Potros de Tijuana at the start of 2006.

After being let go by Tijuana, Jiménez was named to the coaching staff of the Tri-City Dust Devils, the Single-A affiliate of the Colorado Rockies. In 2007, he became the hitting coach for the Asheville Tourists, where he served for two seasons. He was also elected to the Mexican Professional Baseball Hall of Fame in 2007.

Jiménez was hired as the manager of the Pericos de Puebla in 2009. That year, he also served as third base coach for the Mexico national baseball team at the 2009 World Baseball Classic. Jiménez led Puebla to the 2010 Final Series, but lost to Saltillo 1 games to 4. After the 2011 season, Jiménez left the Pericos and was later hired by the Petroleros de Minatitlán in May 2012 as a replacement for Roberto Heras; after taking the Petroleros with a 19–40 record, Minatitlán finished the season last in the South Division with a 40–73 record.

In 2013, he was enshrined into the Caribbean Baseball Hall of Fame. In February 2013 he was named again Puebla's manager. On 14 May 2014, Jiménez left Puebla, replaced by Joe Alvarez. On 14 July 2014, he was hired as the manager of El Águila de Veracruz replacing Eddie Castro. In 2015, Jiménez managed Olmecas de Tabasco finishing sixth in the South Division with a 48–56 record.

On 29 April 2016, Jiménez was appointed manager of Oaxaca, replacing Enrique Reyes. He managed the Guerreros for two seasons, failing to qualify for the postseason in both years. Jiménez was named manager of the Olmecas de Tabasco for the first tournament of 2018 season, finishing sixth in the South Division. On 18 May 2019, he was hired by the Tecolotes de los Dos Laredos, replacing manager Félix Fermín; on 23 August 2018, with six games remaining in the season and with a 36–41 record, he was replaced by Rafael Rijo.

On 1 January 2024, Jiménez joined the Dorados de Chihuahua as the team's third base coach.

== Managerial statistics ==
=== Mexican League ===
Year	Team	Regular season						Postseason			
Year	Team	Games	Won	Lost	Tied	Pct.	Finish	Won	Lost	Pct.	Notes
1999	Saraperos de Saltillo	119	74	45	0	.622	1st in North	7	6	.538	Lost Semifinals (México)
2000	Saraperos de Saltillo	120	77	42	1	.646	1st in North	1	4	.200	Lost First round (Monterrey)
2001	Saraperos de Saltillo	120	68	52	0	.567	1st in North	3	4	.429	Lost First round (Monterrey)
2002	Guerreros de Oaxaca	108	62	45	1	.579	1st in South	7	4	.636	Lost Championship Series (Tigres)
2003	Guerreros de Oaxaca	109	57	52	0	.523	3rd in South	6	4	.600	Lost Championship Series (Tigres)
2004	Guerreros de Oaxaca	98	50	48	0	.510	4th in South	1	8	.111	Lost Second round (México)
2005	Diablos Rojos del México	107	56	51	0	.523	4th in North	4	8	.333	Lost Second round (Tijuana)
2006	Potros de Tijuana	35	19	16	0	.543	–	–	–	–	–
2009	Pericos de Puebla	105	62	43	0	.590	3rd in South	5	5	.500	Lost Championship Series (Tigres)
2010	Pericos de Puebla	105	66	39	0	.629	1st in South	9	8	.529	Lost Serie Final (Saltillo)
2011	Pericos de Puebla	106	53	53	0	.500	4th in North	2	4	.333	Lost First round (México)
2012	Petroleros de Minatitlán	54	21	33	0	.389	8th in South	–	–	–	–
2013	Pericos de Puebla	106	58	48	0	.547	3rd in North	1	3	.250	Lost First round (Monterrey)
2014	Pericos de Puebla	35	14	21	0	.400	–	–	–	–	–
2014	El Águila de Veracruz	30	16	14	0	.533	6th in South	–	–	–	–
2015	Olmecas de Tabasco	104	48	56	0	.462	6th in South	–	–	–	–
2016	Guerreros de Oaxaca	91	38	52	1	.423	7th in South	–	–	–	–
2017	Guerreros de Oaxaca	107	40	67	0	.374	7th in South	–	–	–	–
2018	Olmecas de Tabasco	57	24	33	0	.421	6th in South	–	–	–	–
2019	Tecolotes de los Dos Laredos	77	36	41	0	.468	6th in South	–	–	–	–
Total		1793	939	851	3	.525		46	58	.442	
