= 2000 Mexican Baseball League season =

2000 Mexican League season
- League: Mexican League
- Sport: Baseball
- Games: 961
- Teams: 16

Serie del Rey
- Champions: Tigres Capitalinos
- Runners-up: Diablos Rojos del México

LMB seasons
- ← 1999 2001 →

The 2000 Mexican League season was the 76th season in the history of the Mexican League. It was contested by sixteen teams divided into three zones: North, Central and South. Tigres Capitalinos won its seventh championship after defeating Diablos Rojos del México in the Serie del Rey 4 games to 1, led by manager Dan Firova.

Pericos de Puebla replaced Rieleros de Aguascalientes when the franchise was bought by a group of businessmen from Puebla ahead of the season.

== Standings ==
North
Pos	Team	W	L	Pct.	GB
1	Saraperos de Saltillo	77	42	.647	—
2	Sultanes de Monterrey	59	63	.484	19.5
3	Acereros de Monclova	58	63	.479	20.0
4	Algodoneros de Unión Laguna	56	65	.463	22.0
5	Tecolotes de los Dos Laredos	54	66	.450	23.5
6	Broncos de Reynosa	50	69	.420	27.0

Central
Pos	Team	W	L	Pct.	GB
1	Tigres Capitalinos	74	44	.627	—
2	Diablos Rojos del México	70	47	.598	3.5
3	Guerreros de Oaxaca	59	57	.509	14.0
4	Cafeteros de Córdoba	53	63	.457	20.0
5	Pericos de Puebla	50	68	.424	24.0

South
Pos	Team	W	L	Pct.	GB
1	Leones de Yucatán	69	52	.570	—
2	Olmecas de Tabasco	66	55	.545	3.0
3	Rojos del Águila de Veracruz	61	58	.513	7.0
4	Piratas de Campeche	59	60	.496	9.0
5	Langosteros de Cancún	38	81	.319	30.0

== Postseason ==
First round
2	Tigres Capitalinos	4
7	Guerreros de Oaxaca	2
1	Saraperos de Saltillo	1
8	Sultanes de Monterrey	4
3	Diablos Rojos del México	4
6	Rojos del Águila de Veracruz	2
4	Leones de Yucatán	4
5	Olmecas de Tabasco	0

Semifinals
2	Tigres Capitalinos	4
8	Sultanes de Monterrey	1
3	Diablos Rojos del México	4
4	Leones de Yucatán	1

Serie del Rey
2	Tigres Capitalinos	4
3	Diablos Rojos del México	1

== League leaders ==
Batting leaders
Stat	Player	Team	Total
AVG	(United States) Warren Newson	Unión Laguna	.386
HR	(Mexico) Eduardo Jiménez	Saltillo	45
RBI	(Dominican Republic) Julian Yan	Córdoba	129
R	(Curaçao) Sharnol Adriana	Campeche	113
H	(Venezuela) Oscar Azócar	Oaxaca	185
SB	(Venezuela) Willie Romero	Saltillo	45

Pitching leaders
Stat	Player	Team	Total
ERA	(Mexico) Luis Fernando Morales	Veracruz	2.04
W	5 tied with (Note: Will Flynt, Emigdio López, Ángel Moreno, José Núñez, Efraín Valdez)		13
K	(Dominican Republic) Ravelo Manzanillo	Yucatán	183
IP	(Mexico) José Núñez	Dos Laredos	214.2
SV	(Panama) Santos Hernández	Tigres	36

== Milestones ==
=== Batters ===
- Miguel Ojeda (México): On 19 May, Ojeda hit four home runs in a game against the Acereros de Monclova. Ojeda became the third player in the history of the Mexican League to achieve this feat.

== Awards ==
Award	Player	Team	Ref.
Pitcher of the Year	(Mexico) Luis Fernando Morales	Veracruz	
Rookie of the Year	(Mexico) Pablo Ortega	Tigres	
