= 2025 Mexican Baseball League season =

2025 Mexican League season
- League: Mexican League
- Sport: Baseball
- Duration: 17 April – 14 September
- Games: 930
- Teams: 20

Serie del Rey
- Champions: Diablos Rojos del México
- Runners-up: Charros de Jalisco
- Finals MVP: José Marmolejos

LMB seasons
- ← 2024 2026 →

The 2025 Mexican League season was the 100th season in the history of the baseball Mexican League (LMB). The league was contested by 20 teams, evenly divided in North and South zones. The season started on 11 April with the series between the defending champions the Diablos Rojos del México and the Leones de Yucatán and ended on 14 September with the last game of the Serie del Rey, where the Diablos Rojos del México defeated the Charros de Jalisco to win the championship.

== Standings ==
North
Rank	Team	W	L	Pct.	GB
1	Sultanes de Monterrey	50	32	.610	–
2	Toros de Tijuana	48	34	.585	2.0
3	Acereros de Monclova	44	36	.550	5.0
4	Algodoneros de Unión Laguna	45	37	.549	5.0
5	Tecolotes de los Dos Laredos	45	37	.667	5.0
6	Charros de Jalisco	41	41	.500	9.0
7	Saraperos de Saltillo	41	41	.500	9.0
8	Dorados de Chihuahua	37	44	.457	12.5
9	Caliente de Durango	35	48	.422	15.5
10	Rieleros de Aguascalientes	32	48	.400	17.0

South
Rank	Team	W	L	Pct.	GB
1	Diablos Rojos del México	50	32	.610	–
2	Guerreros de Oaxaca	44	38	.537	13.0
3	Piratas de Campeche	43	39	.524	14.0
4	Pericos de Puebla	39	42	.481	17.5
5	El Águila de Veracruz	39	43	.476	18.0
6	Olmecas de Tabasco	38	45	.458	19.5
7	Bravos de León	37	45	.451	20.0
8	Leones de Yucatán	37	45	.451	20.0
9	Conspiradores de Querétaro	33	48	.407	23.5
10	Tigres de Quintana Roo	33	50	.398	24.5

== Milestones ==
=== Pitchers ===
==== No-hitters ====
- Kurt Heyer / Mario Meza / Denis Correa / Ryan Meisinger (SLT): On 26 April, combined to throw a no-hitter by defeating the Dorados de Chihuahua 3–0.

== League leaders ==
Batting leaders
Stat	Player	Team	Total
AVG	(Mexico) Carlos Sepúlveda	México	.395
HR	(Dominican Republic) Aderlin Rodríguez	Tijuana	35
RBI	(Dominican Republic) Andretty Cordero	Aguascalientes	100
R	(Colombia) Harold Ramírez	Dos Laredos	90
H	(Colombia) Harold Ramírez	Dos Laredos	142
SB	(Panama) Allen Córdoba	Jalisco	48
OPS	(United States) Nicholas Torres	Unión Laguna	1.155

Pitching leaders
Stat	Player	Team	Total
W	(Mexico) Wilmer Ríos	Monclova	10
L	(United States) Steven Moyers	Tigres	10
ERA	(United States) Carl Edwards Jr.	Tigres	3.38
K	(United States) Deylen Miley	Aguascalientes	100
IP	(Venezuela) Junior Guerra	Dos Laredos	105.2
SV	(Japan) Tomohiro Anraku	México	22
WHIP	(United States) Miller Hogan	Campeche	1.21

== Awards ==
Award	Player	Team	Ref.
Pitcher of the Year	Wilmer Ríos	Acereros de Monclova	
Reliever of the Year	Tomohiro Anraku	Diablos Rojos del México	
Comeback Player	Aderlin Rodríguez	Bravos de León/Toros de Tijuana	
Rookie of the Year	Juan Mora	Acereros de Monclova	

== Signees to other leagues ==
This list only includes players who played in the Mexican League in 2025 and then signed with another professional league. Bolded players made the major league roster in their new league.

Player	Position	LMB team	New team	Ref.
Billy Hamilton	OF	Charros de Jalisco	Chicago Cubs (MLB)	
Xzavion Curry	RHP	Tigres de Quintana Roo	Colorado Rockies (MLB)	
Ronaldo Hernández	C	Pericos de Puebla	Boston Red Sox (MLB)	
**Carl Edwards Jr.**	RHP	Tigres de Quintana Roo	Los Angeles Angels (MLB)	
**Carl Edwards Jr.**	RHP	Tigres de Quintana Roo	Texas Rangers (MLB)	
Francisco Mejia	C	Diablos Rojos del México	Washington Nationals (MLB)	
Devin Smeltzer	LHP	Dorados de Chihuahua	Detroit Tigers (MLB)	
**Luke Voit**	1B	Tigres de Quintana Roo	Tohoku Rakuten Golden Eagles (NPB)	
Aaron Brooks	RHP	Caliente de Durango	Athletics (MLB)	
**Sammy Peralta**	LHP	El Águila de Veracruz	Los Angeles Angels (MLB)	
Beau Burrows	RHP	Tecolotes de los Dos Laredos	Pittsburgh Pirates (MLB)	
Tommy Romero	RHP	Guerreros de Oaxaca	Chicago Cubs (MLB)	
Cory Abbott	RHP	Tecolotes de los Dos Laredos	Texas Rangers (MLB)	
Stephen Nogosek	RHP	Diablos Rojos del México	Kansas City Royals (MLB)	
Andrew Vasquez	LHP	Tecolotes de los Dos Laredos	Los Angeles Angels (MLB)	
Parker Dunshee	RHP	Toros de Tijuana	Washington Nationals (MLB)	
Robert Dugger	RHP	Guerreros de Oaxaca	Texas Rangers (MLB)	
**Daniel Johnson**	OF	Caliente de Durango	San Francisco Giants (MLB)	
Nick Margevicius	LHP	Tecos de los Dos Laredos	Detroit Tigers (MLB)	
Andrew Stevenson	OF	Piratas de Campeche	Tampa Bay Rays (MLB)	
Nick Senzel	IF	Tecolotes de los Dos Laredos	Los Angeles Dodgers (MLB)	
