= 1981 Mexican Baseball League season =

1981 Mexican League season
- League: Mexican League
- Sport: Baseball
- Duration: March – September 9
- Games: 993
- Teams: 16

Serie Final
- Champions: Diablos Rojos del México
- Runners-up: Broncos de Reynosa

LMB seasons
- ← 1980 1982 →

The 1981 Mexican League season was the 57th season in the history of the Mexican League in baseball. It was contested by 16 teams, evenly divided in North and South zones. The season started on March and ended on 9 September with the last game of the Serie Final, where Diablos Rojos del México defeated Broncos de Reynosa to win the championship.

== Standings ==
=== North ===
Northeast
Rank	Team	W	L	T	Pct.	GB
1	Tecolotes de Nuevo Laredo	75	50	1	.600	—
2	Broncos de Reynosa	62	64	1	.492	13.5
3	Sultanes de Monterrey	59	69	0	.461	17.5
4	Rieleros de Aguascalientes	57	70	2	.449	19.0

Northwest
Rank	Team	W	L	T	Pct.	GB
1	Saraperos de Saltillo	72	52	2	.581	—
2	Indios de Ciudad Juárez	71	57	0	.555	3.0
3	Diablos Blancos de Unión Laguna	68	58	1	.540	5.0
4	Dorados de Chihuahua	36	90	1	.286	37.0

=== South ===
Southeast
Rank	Team	W	L	T	Pct.	GB
1	Diablos Rojos del México	75	47	5	.615	—
2	Piratas de Campeche	71	50	3	.587	3.5
3	Leones de Yucatán	72	51	3	.585	3.5
4	Petroleros de Poza Rica	38	87	0	.304	38.5

Southwest
Rank	Team	W	L	T	Pct.	GB
1	Tigres Capitalinos	65	56	3	.537	—
2	Azules de Coatzacoalcos	62	60	3	.508	3.5
3	Plataneros de Tabasco	59	59	3	.500	4.5
4	Rojos del Águila de Veracuz	51	73	4	.411	15.5

== Postseason ==
First stage
NE1	Tecolotes de Nuevo Laredo	4
NW2	Indios de Ciudad Juárez	2
North
NW1	Saraperos de Saltillo	0
NE2	Broncos de Reynosa	4
SE1	Diablos Rojos del México	4
SW2	Azules de Coatzacoalcos	1
South
SW1	Tigres Capitalinos	1
SE2	Piratas de Campeche	4

Zone Finals
NE1	Tecolotes de Nuevo Laredo	1
NE2	Broncos de Reynosa	4
SE1	Diablos Rojos del México	4
SE2	Piratas de Campeche	3

Serie Final
N	Broncos de Reynosa	3
S	Diablos Rojos del México	4

== League leaders ==
Batting leaders
Stat	Player	Team	Total
AVG	(United States) Willie Norwood	Broncos de Reynosa	.365
HR	(Mexico) Andrés Mora	Saraperos de Saltillo	23
RBI	(Mexico) Andrés Mora	Saraperos de Saltillo	93
H	(Mexico) Roberto Rodríguez	Diablos Rojos del México	165
SB	(United States) Dell Alston	Leones de Yucatán	37
SLG	(United States) Greg Biagini	Indios de Ciudad Juárez	.583

Pitching leaders
Stat	Player	Team	Total
ERA	(Mexico) Vicente Romo	Azules de Coatzacoalcos	1.40
W	(Mexico) Rafael García	Indios de Ciudad Juárez	20
SV	(Mexico) Antonio Pulido	Piratas de Campeche	27
K	(Mexico) Rafael García	Indios de Ciudad Juárez	187

== Awards ==
LMB Awards
Award	Player	Team	Ref.
Rookie of the Year	(Mexico) Teodoro Higuera	Indios de Ciudad Juárez	
