= 1999 Mexican Baseball League season =

1999 Mexican League season
- League: Mexican League
- Sport: Baseball
- Games: 953
- Teams: 16

Serie del Rey
- Champions: Diablos Rojos del México
- Runners-up: Tigres Capitalinos

LMB seasons
- ← 1998 2000 →

The 1999 Mexican League season was the 75th season in the history of the Mexican League. It was contested by sixteen teams divided into three zones: North, Central and South. The season ended on 4 September with the last game of the Serie del Rey. Diablos Rojos del México won its twelfth championship after defeating Tigres Capitalinos in the Serie del Rey 4 games to 2, led by manager Tim Johnson.

== Standings ==
North
Pos	Team	W	L	Pct.	GB	Pts.
1	Saraperos de Saltillo	74	45	.622	—	15
2	Acereros de Monclova	71	46	.607	2.0	15
3	Sultanes de Monterrey	64	54	.542	9.5	13
4	Tecolotes de los Dos Laredos	53	65	.449	20.5	11.5
5	Algodoneros de Unión Laguna	50	69	.420	24.0	11.5
6	Broncos de Reynosa	42	75	.359	31.0	10

Central
Pos	Team	W	L	Pct.	GB	Pts.
1	Tigres Capitalinos	75	38	.664	—	15
2	Diablos Rojos del México	74	43	.632	3.0	15
3	Cafeteros de Córdoba	51	66	.436	26.0	13
4	Guerreros de Oaxaca	49	70	.412	29.0	11.5
5	Rieleros de Aguascalientes	47	74	.388	32.0	11.5

South
Pos	Team	W	L	Pct.	GB	Pts.
1	Langosteros de Cancún	63	57	.525	—	14
2	Piratas de Campeche	58	60	.492	4.0	14
3	Olmecas de Tabasco	63	57	.525	—	13.5
4	Leones de Yucatán	60	56	.517	1.0	13.5
5	Rojos del Águila de Veracruz	50	69	.420	12.5	11

== Postseason ==
First round
1	Tigres Capitalinos	4
8	Olmecas de Tabasco	3
4	Acereros de Monclova	4
5	Langosteros de Cancún	0
2	Diablos Rojos del México	4
7	Sultanes de Monterrey	1
3	Saraperos de Saltillo	4
6	Piratas de Campeche	2

Semifinals
1	Tigres Capitalinos	4
4	Acereros de Monclova	2
2	Diablos Rojos del México	4
3	Saraperos de Saltillo	3

Serie del Rey
1	Tigres Capitalinos	2
2	Diablos Rojos del México	4

== League leaders ==
Batting leaders
Stat	Player	Team	Total
AVG	(Dominican Republic) Julio Franco	Tigres	.423
HR	(United States) Mike Meggers	Veracruz / Unión Laguna	28
RBI	(Puerto Rico) Boi Rodríguez	Monclova	105
R	(Venezuela) Willie Romero	Tigres / Saltillo	110
H	(Mexico) Matías Carrillo	Tigres	175
SB	(Puerto Rico) Boi Rodríguez	Monclova	43

Pitching leaders
Stat	Player	Team	Total
ERA	(Mexico) Juan Jesús Álvarez	Tabasco	2.20
W	(Dominican Republic) José Martínez	Tabasco	16
W	(Mexico) José Félix Navarro	Tigres	16
K	(Mexico) Narciso Elvira	Campeche	133
IP	(Mexico) Alejandro Carrasco	Oaxaca	180.2
SV	(Mexico) Luis Ayala	Saltillo	41

== Milestones ==
=== Pitchers ===
==== No-hitters ====
- Narciso Elvira (Campeche): Elvira threw two no-hitters during the season, the sixth and seventh in franchise history. The first on 20 March defeating Langosteros de Cancún 5–0 in nine innings and the second on 10 June defeating Tecolotes de los Dos Laredos 1–0 in seven innings.

== Awards ==
Award	Player	Team	Ref.
Rookie of the Year	(Mexico) Luis Carlos García	Tigres	
