= 2003 Mexican Baseball League season =

2003 Mexican League season
- League: Mexican League
- Sport: Baseball
- Duration: 18 March – 29 August
- Games: 863
- Teams: 16

Serie del Rey
- Champions: Diablos Rojos del México
- Runners-up: Tigres de la Angelópolis

LMB seasons
- ← 2002 2004 →

The 2003 Mexican League season was the 79th season in the history of the Mexican League. It was contested by sixteen teams evenly divided into two zones: North and South. The season began on 18 March and ended on 29 August with the last game of the Serie del Rey. Diablos Rojos del México won its 14th championship (and second back to back) after defeating Tigres de la Angelópolis in the Serie del Rey 4 games to 1, led by manager Bernie Tatis.

Algodoneros de Unión Laguna were rebranded as Vaqueros Laguna, changing its main color from maroon to orange.

== Standings ==
North
Pos	Team	W	L	Pct.	GB	Pts.
1	Diablos Rojos del México	68	40	.630	—	15
2	Saraperos de Saltillo	62	45	.579	5.5	14
3	Sultanes de Monterrey	66	43	.606	2.5	13.5
4	Pericos de Puebla	62	48	.564	7.0	12
5	Tecolotes de Nuevo Laredo	53	56	.486	15.5	10.5
6	Acereros de Monclova	49	59	.454	19.0	10
7	Broncos de Reynosa	43	63	.406	24.0	9
8	Vaqueros Laguna	39	71	.355	30.0	9

South
Pos	Team	W	L	Pct.	GB	Pts.
1	Tigres de la Angelópolis	72	34	.673	—	16
2	Leones de Yucatán	61	45	.575	10.5	13.5
3	Guerreros de Oaxaca	57	52	.523	16.0	12
4	Piratas de Campeche	55	51	.519	16.5	12
5	Olmecas de Tabasco	49	59	.454	23.5	11
6	Rojos del Águila de Veracruz	50	54	.481	20.5	10.5
7	Langosteros de Cancún	44	63	.411	28.0	10
8	Cafeteros de Córdoba	29	75	.279	41.5	8

== Postseason ==
Quarterfinals
1	Diablos Rojos del Mexico	4
4	Pericos de Puebla	3
North
2	Saraperos de Saltillo	3
3	Sultanes de Monterrey	4
1	Tigres de la Angelópolis	4
4	Piratas de Campeche	2
South
2	Leones de Yucatán	0
3	Guerreros de Oaxaca	4

Championship Series
1	Diablos Rojos del México	4
3	Sultanes de Monterrey	2
1	Tigres de la Angelópolis	4
3	Guerreros de Oaxaca	2

Serie del Rey
N1	Diablos Rojos del México	4
S1	Tigres de la Angelópolis	1

== League leaders ==
Batting leaders
Stat	Player	Team	Total
AVG	(Dominican Republic) Félix José	México	.377
HR	(Dominican Republic) Guillermo García	Tigres	28
RBI	(Dominican Republic) Guillermo García	Tigres	95
R	(United States) Jayson Bass	Saltillo	102
H	(Mexico) Luis Carlos García	Tigres	144
SB	(United States) Demond Smith	Monterrey	53

Pitching leaders
Stat	Player	Team	Total
ERA	(United States) Dan Serafini	Monterrey	1.59
W	(Dominican Republic) José Mercedes	Saltillo	14
K	(United States) Bo Magee	Campeche	155
IP	(Venezuela) Edwin Hurtado	Cancún / Yucatán	175.0
SV	(Panama) Santos Hernández	Tigres	35

== Awards ==
Award	Player	Team	Ref.
Pitcher of the Year	(Mexico) Pablo Ortega	Puebla	
Rookie of the Year	(Mexico) Jesús Guzmán	Tigres	
