= 2002 Mexican Baseball League season =

2002 Mexican League season
- League: Mexican League
- Sport: Baseball
- Duration: 19 March – 1 September
- Games: 868
- Teams: 16

Serie del Rey
- Champions: Diablos Rojos del México
- Runners-up: Tigres de la Angelópolis
- Finals MVP: Ray Martínez

LMB seasons
- ← 2001 2003 →

The 2002 Mexican League season was the 78th season in the history of the Mexican League. It was contested by sixteen teams evenly divided into two zones: North and South. The season began on 20 March and ended on 1 September with the last game of the Serie del Rey. Diablos Rojos del México won its 13th championship after defeating Tigres de la Angelópolis in the Serie del Rey 4 games to 3, led by manager Bernie Tatis.

Two changes were made in the competition system for the 2002 season. Starting from this year, teams were divided into two zones (North and South) and the number of games per team was reduced from 122 to 110. The Tigres moved from Mexico City to Puebla and changed their name to Tigres de la Angelópolis.

== Standings ==
North
Pos	Team	W	L	Pct.	GB	Pts.
1	Diablos Rojos del México	74	36	.673	—	15
2	Saraperos de Saltillo	66	43	.606	7.5	14.5
3	Tecolotes de Nuevo Laredo	62	48	.564	12.0	12.5
4	Acereros de Monclova	56	54	.509	18.0	12
5	Sultanes de Monterrey	60	49	.550	13.5	11.5
6	Algodoneros de Unión Laguna	44	65	.404	29.5	9.5
7	Broncos de Reynosa	43	67	.391	31.0	9.5
8	Pericos de Puebla	38	70	.352	35.0	8.5

South
Pos	Team	W	L	Pct.	GB	Pts.
1	Guerreros de Oaxaca	62	45	.579	—	14.5
2	Leones de Yucatán	60	47	.561	2.0	14
3	Tigres de la Angelópolis	57	49	.538	4.5	12
4	Rojos del Águila de Veracruz	55	53	.509	7.5	12
5	Langosteros de Cancún	53	54	.495	9.0	12
6	Piratas de Campeche	52	55	.486	10.0	10.5
7	Olmecas de Tabasco	48	61	.440	15.0	10
8	Cafeteros de Córdoba	37	71	.343	25.5	8

== Postseason ==
Quarterfinals
1	Diablos Rojos del Mexico	4
4	Acereros de Monclova	1
North
2	Saraperos de Saltillo	2
3	Tecolotes de Nuevo Laredo	4
1	Guerreros de Oaxaca	4
4	Rojos del Águila de Veracruz	0
South
2	Leones de Yucatán	2
3	Tigres de la Angelópolis	4

Championship Series
1	Diablos Rojos del México	4
3	Tecolotes de Nuevo Laredo	3
1	Guerreros de Oaxaca	3
3	Tigres de la Angelópolis	4

Serie del Rey
N1	Diablos Rojos del México	4
S3	Tigres de la Angelópolis	3

== League leaders ==
Batting leaders
Stat	Player	Team	Total
AVG	(Venezuela) Willie Romero	Saltillo	.387
HR	(Mexico) Roberto Saucedo	Nuevo Laredo	32
RBI	(Dominican Republic) Félix José	México	102
R	(Venezuela) Lino Connell	Oaxaca	102
H	(Venezuela) Lino Connell	Oaxaca	163
SB	(United States) Demond Smith	Monterrey	41

Pitching leaders
Stat	Player	Team	Total
ERA	(Venezuela) Edwin Hurtado	Cancún	1.38
W	(Mexico) Eleazar Mora	Veracruz	15
K	(Mexico) Francisco Campos	Campeche	125
IP	(Dominican Republic) Efraín Valdez	Tabasco / Córdoba	156.0
IP	(Mexico) Obed Vega	Cancún	156.0
SV	(Mexico) Miguel Rubio	Monterrey	32

== Milestones ==
=== Pitchers ===
==== No-hitters ====
- Jesús Olague (Puebla): On 13 April, Olague threw the fourth no-hitter in franchise history by defeating the Tigres de la Angelópolis 6–0 in nine innings.
- Obed Vega (Cancún): On 13 June, Vega threw the first no-hitter in franchise history by defeating the Piratas de Campeche 1–0 in seven innings.

== Awards ==
Award	Player	Team	Ref.
Pitcher of the Year	(Mexico) Eleazar Mora	Veracruz	
Rookie of the Year	(Mexico) Carlos Gastélum	Puebla / Tigres	
