= 2009 Mexican Baseball League season =

2009 Mexican League season
- League: Mexican League
- Sport: Baseball
- Duration: 24 March – 29 August
- Teams: 16

Serie del Rey
- Champions: Saraperos de Saltillo
- Runners-up: Tigres de Quintana Roo
- Finals MVP: Rafael Díaz

LMB seasons
- ← 2008 2010 →

The 2009 Mexican League season was the 85th season in the history of the Mexican League. It was contested by 16 teams, evenly divided in North and South zones. The season started on 24 March with the match between 2008 season champions Diablos Rojos del México and Sultanes de Monterrey and ended on 29 August with the last game of the Serie del Rey, where Saraperos de Saltillo defeated Tigres de Quintana Roo to win the championship.

The Broncos de Reynosa returned to the league after the Potros de Tijuana franchise was acquired and relocated to Reynosa with the support of the Reynosa municipal government, which also funded renovations to Estadio Adolfo López Mateos. There was a change in the league structure: Diablos Rojos del México moved to the North Zone and Pericos de Puebla moved to the South Zone. For this season, up to four foreign players were allowed per team.

Due to the swine flu pandemic, the league decided to play the matches between 28 and 30 April behind closed doors and suspended all the series from 1 to 5 May.

== Standings ==
North
Rank	Team	W	L	Pct.	GB	STK	Pts.
1	Diablos Rojos del México	70	35	.667	—	L1	16
2	Broncos de Reynosa	58	47	.552	12.0	L1	12
3	Saraperos de Saltillo	59	48	.551	12.0	W1	13
4	Acereros de Monclova	57	50	.533	14.0	W1	12
5	Vaqueros Laguna	55	51	.519	15.5	L1	12.5
6	Sultanes de Monterrey	51	56	.477	20.0	W1	10.5
7	Dorados de Chihuahua	40	67	.374	31.0	L11	9
8	Tecolotes de Nuevo Laredo	35	71	.330	35.5	W3	8

South
Rank	Team	W	L	Pct.	GB	STK	Pts.
1	Tigres de Quintana Roo	71	36	.664	—	W6	15
2	Leones de Yucatán	68	38	.642	2.5	W4	15
3	Pericos de Puebla	62	43	.590	8.0	W2	13
4	Piratas de Campeche	56	51	.523	15.0	L2	12
5	Rojos del Águila de Veracruz	51	56	.477	20.0	L4	11
6	Guerreros de Oaxaca	42	63	.400	28.0	W1	9.5
7	Olmecas de Tabasco	39	63	.382	29.5	L1	9
8	Petroleros de Minatitlán	34	73	.318	37.0	L9	8.5

Note: Teams got points based on their position in each one of the two rounds of the tournament. Qualification to the playoffs was determined by the number of points instead of the final position at the end of the regular season.

== Postseason ==
First stage
1	Diablos Rojos del México	3
5	Vaqueros Laguna	4
North
4	Broncos de Reynosa	2
5	Saraperos de Saltillo	4
2	Tigres de Quintana Roo	4
7	Piratas de Campeche	3
South
3	Leones de Yucatán	1
6	Pericos de Puebla	4

Championship Series
5	Vaqueros Laguna	0
3	Saraperos de Saltillo	4
1	Tigres de Quintana Roo	4
3	Pericos de Puebla	1

Serie del Rey
N3	Saraperos de Saltillo	4
S1	Tigres de Quintana Roo	2

=== Serie del Rey ===
==== Summary ====
Saraperos de Saltillo won the series, 4–2.

Game	Date	Score	Location	Time	Attendance
1	22 August	Tigres – 6, Saltillo – 7	Estadio Francisco I. Madero	-	15,864
2	23 August	Tigres – 3, Saltillo – 6	Estadio Francisco I. Madero	-	15,949
3	25 August	Saltillo – 3, Tigres – 8	Estadio Beto Ávila	-	8,500
4	26 August	Saltillo – 1, Tigres – 6	Estadio Beto Ávila	-	7,331
5	27 August	Saltillo – 10, Tigres – 5	Estadio Beto Ávila	-	8,947
6	15 September	Tigres – 1, Saltillo – 14	Estadio Francisco I. Madero	-	14,002

== League leaders ==
Batting leaders
Stat	Player	Team	Total
AVG	(Dominican Republic) Dionys César	Laguna	.380
HR	(Panama) Rubén Rivera	Campeche	32
RBI	(Mexico) Roberto Saucedo	México	109
R	(Mexico) Eduardo Arredondo	México	97
H	(Dominican Republic) Dionys César	Laguna	156
SB	(Dominican Republic) Dionys César	Laguna	40
SLG	(Panama) Rubén Rivera	Campeche	.669

Pitching leaders
Stat	Player	Team	Total
ERA	(Mexico) Francisco Campos	Campeche	2.31
ERA	(Mexico) Juan Pablo Oramas	México	2.31
W	(Mexico) Andrés Meza	Puebla	15
SV	(United States) Scott Chiasson	Tigres	34
IP	(Mexico) Francisco Campos	Campeche	144.1
K	(Dominican Republic) Nerio Rodríguez	Monclova	117
WHIP	(Mexico) Enrique Quintanilla	Nuevo Laredo	0.94

== Awards ==
Award	Player	Team	Ref.
Most Valuable Player	(Dominican Republic) Dionys César	Laguna	
Rookie of the Year	(Mexico) Japhet Amador	Veracruz	
Rookie of the Year	(Mexico) Juan Pablo Oramas	México	
Pitcher of the Year	(Mexico) Andrés Meza	Puebla	
Reliever of the Year	(United States) Scott Chiasson	Tigres	
Manager of the Year	(Mexico) Houston Jiménez	Puebla	
