= 2001 Mexican Baseball League season =

2001 Mexican League season
- League: Mexican League
- Sport: Baseball
- Duration: 19 March – 11 September
- Games: 961
- Teams: 16

Serie del Rey
- Champions: Tigres Capitalinos
- Runners-up: Diablos Rojos del México
- Finals MVP: Luis Carlos García

LMB seasons
- ← 2000 2002 →

The 2001 Mexican League season was the 77th season in the history of the Mexican League. It was contested by sixteen teams divided into three zones: North, Central and South. The season began on 19 March and ended on 11 September with the last game of the Serie del Rey. Tigres Capitalinos won its eight championship (and second back to back) after defeating Diablos Rojos del México in the Serie del Rey 4 games to 2, led by manager Dan Firova.

== Standings ==
North
Pos	Team	W	L	Pct.	GB
1	Saraperos de Saltillo	68	52	.567	—
2	Broncos de Reynosa	69	53	.566	—
3	Acereros de Monclova	67	52	.563	0.5
4	Sultanes de Monterrey	68	53	.562	0.5
5	Algodoneros de Unión Laguna	61	59	.508	7.0
6	Tecolotes de los Dos Laredos	48	72	.400	20.0

Central
Pos	Team	W	L	Pct.	GB
1	Tigres Capitalinos	74	43	.632	—
2	Diablos Rojos del México	69	51	.575	6.5
3	Pericos de Puebla	54	62	.466	19.5
4	Guerreros de Oaxaca	50	69	.420	25.0
5	Cafeteros de Córdoba	38	78	.328	35.5

South
Pos	Team	W	L	Pct.	GB
1	Leones de Yucatán	68	53	.562	—
2	Piratas de Campeche	62	56	.525	4.5
3	Olmecas de Tabasco	56	66	.459	12.5
4	Rojos del Águila de Veracruz	55	66	.455	13.0
5	Langosteros de Cancún	49	71	.408	18.5

== Postseason ==
Quarterfinals
1	Tigres Capitalinos	4
8	Piratas de Campeche	2
3	Saraperos de Saltillo	3
6	Sultanes de Monterrey	4
2	Diablos Rojos del México	4
7	Leones de Yucatán	1
4	Broncos de Reynosa	2
5	Acereros de Monclova	4

Semifinals
1	Tigres Capitalinos	4
6	Sultanes de Monterrey	3
2	Diablos Rojos del México	4
5	Acereros de Monclova	0

Serie del Rey
1	Tigres Capitalinos	4
2	Diablos Rojos del México	2

== League leaders ==
Batting leaders
Stat	Player	Team	Total
AVG	(Dominican Republic) Julio Franco	Tigres	.437
HR	(Puerto Rico) Boi Rodríguez	Monclova	33
HR	(United States) Mark Whiten	Veracruz	33
RBI	(Puerto Rico) Boi Rodríguez	Monclova	100
R	(Puerto Rico) Boi Rodríguez	Monclova	103
H	(Dominican Republic) Julio Franco	Tigres	178
SB	(United States) Demond Smith	Tabasco / Monterrey	36

Pitching leaders
Stat	Player	Team	Total
ERA	(Dominican Republic) Ravelo Manzanillo	Yucatán	1.52
W	(Spain) Danny Rios	Unión Laguna	18
K	(Dominican Republic) Ravelo Manzanillo	Yucatán	202
IP	(Spain) Danny Rios	Unión Laguna	208.2
SV	(Mexico) José Juan López	Reynosa	41

== Milestones ==
=== Pitchers ===
==== No-hitters ====
- Mike Romano (Saltillo): On 20 May, Romano threw the eight no-hitter in franchise history by defeating the Sultanes de Monterrey 6–0 in seven innings.
- Ravelo Manzanillo (Yucatán): On 28 June, Manzanillo threw the fifth no-hitter in franchise history by defeating the Piratas de Campeche 1–0 in seven innings.
- Alejandro Romero (Monclova): On 11 July, Romero threw the seventh no-hitter in franchise history by defeating the Rojos del Águila de Veracruz 1–0 in nine innings.
- Mike Romano (Saltillo): On 18 August, Romano threw his second no-hitter of the season and the ninth no-hitter in franchise history by defeating the Sultanes de Monterrey 9–0 in nine innings in quarterfinals.

== Awards ==
Award	Player	Team	Ref.
Pitcher of the Year	(Spain) Danny Rios	Unión Laguna	
Rookie of the Year	(Mexico) Albino Contreras	Puebla	
