= 2004 Mexican Baseball League season =

2004 Mexican League season
- League: Mexican League
- Sport: Baseball
- Duration: 16 March – 3 August
- Games: 781
- Teams: 16

Serie del Rey
- Champions: Piratas de Campeche
- Runners-up: Saraperos de Saltillo

LMB seasons
- ← 2003 2005 →

The 2004 Mexican League season was the 80th season in the history of the Mexican League. It was contested by sixteen teams evenly divided into two zones: North and South. The season began on 16 March and ended on 3 August with the last game of the Serie del Rey. Piratas de Campeche won its second championship after defeating Saraperos de Saltillo in the Serie del Rey 4 games to 1, led by manager Francisco Estrada.

Prior to the beginning of the season three teams were replaced. Rieleros de Aguascalientes bought the Cafeteros de Córdoba franchise, Tuneros de San Luis took over Broncos de Reynosa and Toros de Tijuana replaced Tecolotes de los Dos Laredos. The number of games also changed from the previous season, from 113 to 100 per team.

== Standings ==
North
Pos	Team	W	L	Pct.	GB	Pts.
1	Pericos de Puebla	63	34	.649	—	15
2	Saraperos de Saltillo	63	34	.649	—	15
3	Sultanes de Monterrey	56	41	.577	7.0	13
4	Toros de Tijuana	49	48	.505	14.0	12
5	Vaqueros Laguna	45	54	.455	19.0	10
6	Rieleros de Aguascalientes	45	55	.450	19.5	10
7	Acereros de Monclova	39	60	.394	25.0	10
8	Tuneros de San Luis	32	66	.327	31.5	8

South
Pos	Team	W	L	Pct.	GB	Pts.
1	Diablos Rojos del México	60	40	.600	—	15
2	Piratas de Campeche	55	42	.567	3.5	14
3	Tigres de la Angelópolis	54	45	.545	5.5	13
4	Guerreros de Oaxaca	50	48	.510	9.0	12
5	Olmecas de Tabasco	48	48	.500	10.0	11.5
6	Leones de Yucatán	43	55	.439	16.0	10
7	Rojos del Águila de Veracruz	44	56	.440	16.0	9.5
8	Langosteros de Cancún	40	60	.400	20.0	8

== Postseason ==
First round
North
Pericos de Puebla	4
Rieleros de Aguascalientes	0
Saraperos de Saltillo	4
Vaqueros Laguna	0
Sultanes de Monterrey	4
Toros de Tijuana	3
South
Diablos Rojos del México	4
Leones de Yucatán	1
Piratas de Campeche	4
Olmecas de Tabasco	1
Tigres de la Angelópolis	4
Guerreros de Oaxaca	1

Second round
Pericos de Puebla	4
Toros de Tijuana	1
Saraperos de Saltillo	4
Sultanes de Monterrey	2
Diablos Rojos del México	4
Guerreros de Oaxaca	0
Piratas de Campeche	4
Tigres de la Angelópolis	1

Championship Series
Pericos de Puebla	2
Saraperos de Saltillo	4
Diablos Rojos del México	3
Piratas de Campeche	4

Serie del Rey
Saraperos de Saltillo	1
Piratas de Campeche	4

== League leaders ==
Batting leaders
Stat	Player	Team	Total
AVG	(United States) Demond Smith	Monterrey	.406
HR	(Dominican Republic) Izzy Alcántara	Laguna	27
RBI	(Mexico) Roberto Saucedo	México	97
R	(United States) Morgan Burkhart	Saltillo	100
H	3 tied with (Note: Rontrez Johnson, Óscar Robles, Carlos Valencia)		129
SB	(United States) Rontrez Johnson	Aguascalientes	54

Pitching leaders
Stat	Player	Team	Total
ERA	(Mexico) Francisco Campos	Campeche	1.47
W	(Mexico) Francisco Campos	Campeche	12
K	(Mexico) Francisco Campos	Campeche	99
IP	(Cuba) Osvaldo Fernández	Tabasco	123.2
SV	(Panama) Santos Hernández	Tigres	26

== Milestones ==
=== Pitchers ===
- Francisco Campos (Campeche): Campos became the sixth pitcher in the Mexican League history to win the Triple Crown, recording 1.47 ERA, 12 wins and 99 strikeouts.

==== No-hitters ====
- Rafael Roque (Tigres): On 11 April, Roque threw the seventh no-hitter in franchise history by defeating the Langosteros de Cancún 1–0 in seven innings.

== Awards ==
Award	Player	Team	Ref.
Pitcher of the Year	(Mexico) Francisco Campos	Campeche	
Rookie of the Year	(Mexico) Santiago González	Veracruz	
