= Serie del Rey =

Annual championship series in the Mexican Baseball League

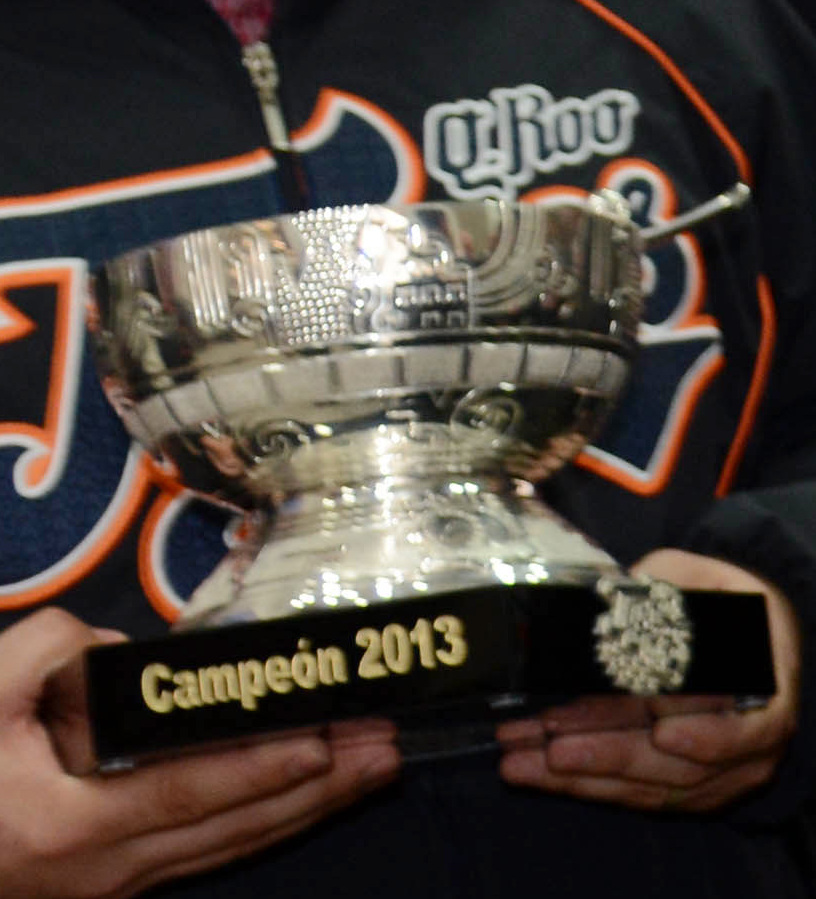
- Copa de Zaachila
- First played: 1970
- Most recently played: 2025
- Current champions: Toros de Tijuana (3rd title)
- Current runners-up: Olmecas de Tabasco
- Most titles: Diablos Rojos del México (18)

The Serie del Rey (lit. 'The King's Series') is the annual championship series of the Mexican Baseball League (LMB), held since 1970. The champions from the league's two divisions, the North and South Zones, compete in a best-of-seven series, with the winner being awarded the Copa de Zaachila. Originally known simply as the Serie Final, the championship series was renamed in 2012, in reference to baseball being called the king of sports.

Before 1970, the league champion was the winner of the most games in a round robin tournament (similar to the National and American Leagues of Major League Baseball before the introduction of the League Championship Series).

The Diablos Rojos del México are the most successful team in LMB history, having won 18 championships in total and 15 of those in the Serie del Rey era. Diablos have also played in 24 championship series since 1970, the most of any team. They are followed by the Tigres de Quintana Roo, who have played in 13 series since 1970 and won 8, and the Sultanes de Monterrey who have played in 12 and won 5.

== League champions (1925–69) ==
Year	Champion	Score	Runners-up
1925	74 Regimiento de San Luis	3–1	Club México
1926	Ocampo de Jalapa	–	Carmona de México
1927	Gendarmería de México	–	Club México
1928	Policía del DF	2–0	Bravo Izquierdo de Puebla
1929	Chiclet's Adams de México	2–1	Delta de México
1930	Tigres de Comintra	–	Obras Públicas de México
1931	Obras Públicas de México	–	Comunicaciones de México
1932	Tráfico de México	–	Club Pachuca
1933	Tigres de Comintra	3–2	Club Pachuca
1934	Monte de Piedad de México	–	Tuneros de San Luis
1935	Agrario de México	–	Tigres de Comintra
1936	Agrario de México	–	Lomas de México
1937	Águila de Veracruz	3–0	Agrario de México
1938	Águila de Veracruz	–	Agrario de México
1939	Cafeteros de Córdoba	–	Águila de Veracruz
1940	Azules de Veracruz México	–	Diablos Rojos del México
1941	Azules de Veracruz México	–	Diablos Rojos del México
1942	Algodoneros del Unión Laguna	–	Industriales de Monterrey
1943	Industriales de Monterrey	–	Algodoneros del Unión Laguna
1944	Azules de Veracruz México	–	Industriales de Monterrey
1945	Alijadores de Tampico	–	Tecolotes de Nvo. Laredo
1946	Alijadores de Tampico	–	Diablos Rojos del México
1947	Industriales de Monterrey	–	Diablos Rojos del México
1948	Sultanes de Monterrey	–	Pericos de Puebla
1949	Sultanes de Monterrey	4–0	Algodoneros del Unión Laguna
1950	Algodoneros del Unión Laguna	4–2	Charros de Jalisco
1951	Azules de Veracruz México	4–1	Tuneros de San Luis
1952	Águila de Veracruz	–	Algodoneros del Unión Laguna
1953	Tecolotes de Nvo. Laredo	–	Sultanes de Monterrey
1954	Tecolotes de Nvo. Laredo	–	Leones de Yucatán
1955	Tigres del México	2–0	Tecolotes de Nvo. Laredo
1956	Diablos Rojos del México	–	Tigres Capitalinos
1957	Leones de Yucatán	–	Diablos Rojos del México
1958	Tecolotes de Nvo. Laredo	–	Diablos Rojos del México
1959	Petroleros de Poza Rica	–	Tecolotes de Nvo. Laredo
1960	Tigres del México	–	Águila de Veracruz
1961	Águila de Veracruz	–	Pericos de Puebla
1962	Sultanes Monterrey	–	Águila de Veracruz
1963	Pericos de Puebla	–	Diablos Rojos del México
1964	Diablos Rojos del México	–	Pericos de Puebla
1965	Tigres del México	–	Pericos de Puebla
1966	Tigres del México	4–2	Diablos Rojos del México
1967	Charros de Jalisco	–	Broncos de Reynosa
1968	Diablos Rojos del México	–	Águila de Veracruz
1969	Broncos de Reynosa	–	Sultanes de Monterrey

== Serie del Rey champions (1970–present) ==
Numbers in parentheses in the table indicate the number of times that team has appeared in the Serie del Rey, as well as each respective team's Serie del Rey record to date. These numbers do not include past championships from the single-table era.

Year	Winning team	Manager	Series	Losing team	Manager
1970	Águila de Veracruz (1, 1–0)	(Cuba) Enrique Izquierdo	4–2	Diablos Rojos del México (1, 0–1)	(Mexico) José Guerrero
1971	Charros de Jalisco (1, 1–0)	(Mexico) Cananea Reyes	4–3	Saraperos de Saltillo (1, 0–1)	(United States) Tomás Herrera
1972	Cafeteros de Córdoba (1, 1–0)	(Mexico) Mario Peláez	4–2	Saraperos de Saltillo (2, 0–2)	(United States) Tomás Herrera
1973	Diablos Rojos del México (2, 1–1)	(Cuba) Wilfredo Calviño	4–3	Saraperos de Saltillo (3, 0–3)	(Mexico) Andrés Tanaka
1974	Diablos Rojos del México (3, 2–1)	(Mexico) Cananea Reyes	4–0	Algodoneros de Unión Laguna (1, 0–1)	(Mexico) José Guerrero
1975	Alijadores de Tampico (1, 1–0)	(Mexico) Benjamín Valenzuela	4–1	Cafeteros de Córdoba (2, 1–1)	(Cuba) Napoleón Reyes
1976	Diablos Rojos del México (4, 3–1)	(Mexico) Cananea Reyes	4–2	Algodoneros de Unión Laguna (2, 0–2)	(Cuba) Manolo Fortes
1977	Tecolotes de Nuevo Laredo (1, 1–0)	(Mexico) Jorge Fitch	4–1	Diablos Rojos del México (5, 3–2)	(Mexico) Cananea Reyes
1978	Rieleros de Aguascalientes (1, 1–0)	(Mexico) Jaime Favela	4–2	Algodoneros de Unión Laguna (3, 0–3)	(Mexico) Moisés Camacho
1979	Ángeles Negros de Puebla (1, 1–0)	(Mexico) Jorge Fitch	4–3	Indios de Ciudad Juárez (1, 0–1)	(Mexico) José Guerrero
1980	Saraperos de Saltillo (4, 1–4)	(Mexico) Gregorio Luque	*	Indios de Ciudad Juárez (2, 0–2)	(Mexico) José Guerrero
1981	Diablos Rojos del México (6, 4–2)	(Dominican Republic) Winston Llenas	4–3	Broncos de Reynosa (1, 0–1)	(Mexico) Benjamín Valenzuela
1982	Indios de Ciudad Juárez (3, 1–2)	(Mexico) José Guerrero	4–0	Tigres Capitalinos (1, 0–1)	(Mexico) Fernando Remes
1983	Piratas de Campeche (1, 1–0)	(Mexico) Francisco Estrada	4–3	Indios de Ciudad Juárez (4, 1–3)	(Mexico) José Guerrero
1984	Leones de Yucatán (1, 1–0)	(Cuba) Carlos Paz	4–2	Indios de Ciudad Juárez (5, 1–3)	(Mexico) José Guerrero
1985	Diablos Rojos del México (7, 5–2)	(Mexico) Cananea Reyes	4–1	Tecolotes de los Dos Laredos (2, 1–1)	(Mexico) Jorge Calvo
1986	Ángeles Negros de Puebla (2, 2–0)	(Mexico) Rodolfo Sandoval	4–1	Sultanes de Monterrey (1, 0–1)	(Mexico) Miguel Sotelo
1987	Diablos Rojos del México (8, 6–2)	(Mexico) Cananea Reyes	4–1	Tecolotes de los Dos Laredos (3, 1–2)	(Mexico) José Guerrero
1988	Diablos Rojos del México (9, 7–2)	(Mexico) Cananea Reyes	4–1	Saraperos de Saltillo (5, 1–5)	
1989	Tecolotes de los Dos Laredos (4, 2–2)	(Mexico) José Guerrero	4–2	Leones de Yucatán (2, 1–1)	(Mexico) Roberto Méndez
1990	Bravos de León (1, 1–0)	(Mexico) Francisco Estrada	4–1	Algodoneros de Unión Laguna (4, 0–4)	(Mexico) Marco Antonio Vázquez
1991	Sultanes de Monterrey (2, 1–1)	(Mexico) Aurelio Rodríguez	4–3	Diablos Rojos del México (10, 7–3)	(Mexico) Cananea Reyes
1992	Tigres de México (2, 1–1)	(Mexico) Gerardo Gutiérrez	4–2	Tecolotes de los Dos Laredos (5, 2–3)	(Mexico) José Guerrero
1993	Olmecas de Tabasco	(Mexico) Juan Navarrete	4–1	Tecolotes de los Dos Laredos (6, 2–4)	(United States) Dan Firova
1994	Diablos Rojos del México (11, 8–3)	(Mexico) Marco Antonio Vázquez	4–3	Sultanes de Monterrey (3, 1–2)	(Mexico) Alex Treviño
1995	Sultanes de Monterrey (4, 2–2)	(United States) Derek Bryant	4–0	Diablos Rojos del México (12, 8–4)	(Mexico) Marco Antonio Vázquez
1996	Sultanes de Monterrey (5, 3–2)	(United States) Derek Bryant	4–1	Diablos Rojos del México (13, 8–5)	(Mexico) Marco Antonio Vázquez
1997	Tigres de México (3, 2–1)	(United States) Dan Firova	4–1	Diablos Rojos del México (14, 8–6)	(Mexico) Marco Antonio Vázquez
1998	Guerreros de Oaxaca	(Mexico) Nelson Barrera	4–0	Acereros de Monclova (1, 0–1)	(Mexico) Aurelio Rodríguez
1999	Diablos Rojos del México (15, 9–6)	(United States) Tim Johnson	4–2	Tigres Capitalinos (4, 2–2)	(United States) Dan Firova
2000	Tigres de México (5, 3–2)	(United States) Dan Firova	4–1	Diablos Rojos del México (16, 9–7)	(Dominican Republic) Bernie Tatís
2001	Tigres de México (6, 4–2)	(United States) Dan Firova	4–2	Diablos Rojos del México (17, 9–8)	(United States) Tim Johnson
2002	Diablos Rojos del México (18, 10–8)	(Dominican Republic) Bernie Tatís	4–3	Tigres de la Angelópolis (7, 4–3)	(United States) Lee Sigman
2003	Diablos Rojos del México (19, 11–8)	(Dominican Republic) Bernie Tatís	4–1	Tigres de la Angelópolis (8, 4–4)	(United States) Lee Sigman
2004	Piratas de Campeche (2, 2–0)	(Mexico) Francisco Estrada	4–1	Saraperos de Saltillo (6, 1–6)	(United States) Derek Bryant
2005	Tigres de la Angelópolis (9, 5–4)	(Mexico) Enrique Reyes	4–2	Saraperos de Saltillo (7, 1–7)	(United States) Derek Bryant
2006	Leones de Yucatán (3, 2–1)	(Puerto Rico) Lino Rivera	4–1	Sultanes de Monterrey (6, 3–3)	(Dominican Republic) Bernie Tatís
2007	Sultanes de Monterrey (7, 4–3)	(Dominican Republic) Félix Fermín	4–3	Leones de Yucatán (4, 2–2)	(Puerto Rico) Lino Rivera
2008	Diablos Rojos del México (20, 12–8)	(Mexico) Daniel Fernández	4–1	Sultanes de Monterrey (8, 4–4)	(Dominican Republic) Félix Fermín
2009	Saraperos de Saltillo (8, 2–7)	(Puerto Rico) Orlando Sánchez	4–2	Tigres de Quintana Roo (10, 5–5)	(Mexico) Matías Carrillo
2010	Saraperos de Saltillo (9, 3–7)	(Puerto Rico) Orlando Sánchez	4–1	Pericos de Puebla (1, 0–1)	(Mexico) Houston Jiménez
2011	Tigres de Quintana Roo (11, 6–5)	(Mexico) Matías Carrillo	4–0	Diablos Rojos del México (21, 12–9)	(Puerto Rico) Mako Oliveras
2012	Rojos del Águila de Veracruz (2, 2–0)	(Mexico) Pedro Meré	4–3	Rieleros de Aguascalientes (2, 1–1)	(Mexico) Enrique Reyes
2013	Tigres de Quintana Roo (12, 7–5)	(Mexico) Roberto Vizcarra	4–1	Sultanes de Monterrey (9, 4–5)	(Mexico) Miguel Flores
2014	Diablos Rojos del Mexico (22, 13–9)	(Mexico) Miguel Ojeda	4–0	Pericos de Puebla (2, 0–2)	(Mexico) Houston Jiménez
2015	Tigres de Quintana Roo (13, 8–5)	(Mexico) Roberto Vizcarra	4–1	Acereros de Monclova (2, 0–2)	(Mexico) Homar Rojas
2016	Pericos de Puebla (3, 1–2)	(United States) Cory Snyder	4–2	Toros de Tijuana (1, 0–1)	(Mexico) Matías Carrillo
2017	Toros de Tijuana (2, 1–1)	(Mexico) Pedro Meré	4–1	Pericos de Puebla (4, 1–3)	(United States) Tim Johnson
2018 (Spring)	Leones de Yucatan (5, 3–2)	(Mexico) Roberto Vizcarra	4–3	Sultanes de Monterrey (10, 4–6)	(Panama) Roberto Kelly
2018 (Fall)	Sultanes de Monterrey (11, 5–6)	(Panama) Roberto Kelly	4–2	Guerreros de Oaxaca	(Mexico) Sergio Omar Gastélum
2019	Acereros de Monclova (3, 1–2)	(United States) Pat Listach	4–3	Leones de Yucatán (6, 3–3)	(Mexico) Gerónimo Gil
2020	No series due to the COVID-19 pandemic				
2021	Toros de Tijuana (3, 2–1)	(Mexico) Homar Rojas	4–3	Leones de Yucatan (7, 3–4)	(Puerto Rico) Luis Matos
2022	Leones de Yucatán (8, 4–4)	(Mexico) Roberto Vizcarra	4–3	Sultanes de Monterrey (12, 5–7)	(Panama) Roberto Kelly
2023	Pericos de Puebla (5, 2–3)	(Mexico) Sergio Omar Gastélum	4–2	Algodoneros de Unión Laguna (5, 0–5)	(Mexico) Ramón Orantes
2024	Diablos Rojos del México (23, 14–9)	(United States) Lorenzo Bundy	4–0	Sultanes de Monterrey (13, 5–8)	(Panama) Roberto Kelly
2025	Diablos Rojos del México (24, 15–9)	(United States) Lorenzo Bundy	4–0	Charros de Jalisco (2, 1–1)	(Mexico) Benjamín Gil
2026	Toros de Tijuana (3, 3–1)	(Panama) Roberto Kelly	4–2	Olmecas de Tabasco (2, 1–1)	(Mexico) Luis Carlos Rivera

== See also ==
- Asia Series
- Caribbean Series
- Japan Series
- Korean Series
- Taiwan Series
- World Series
