= Copa de Zaachila =

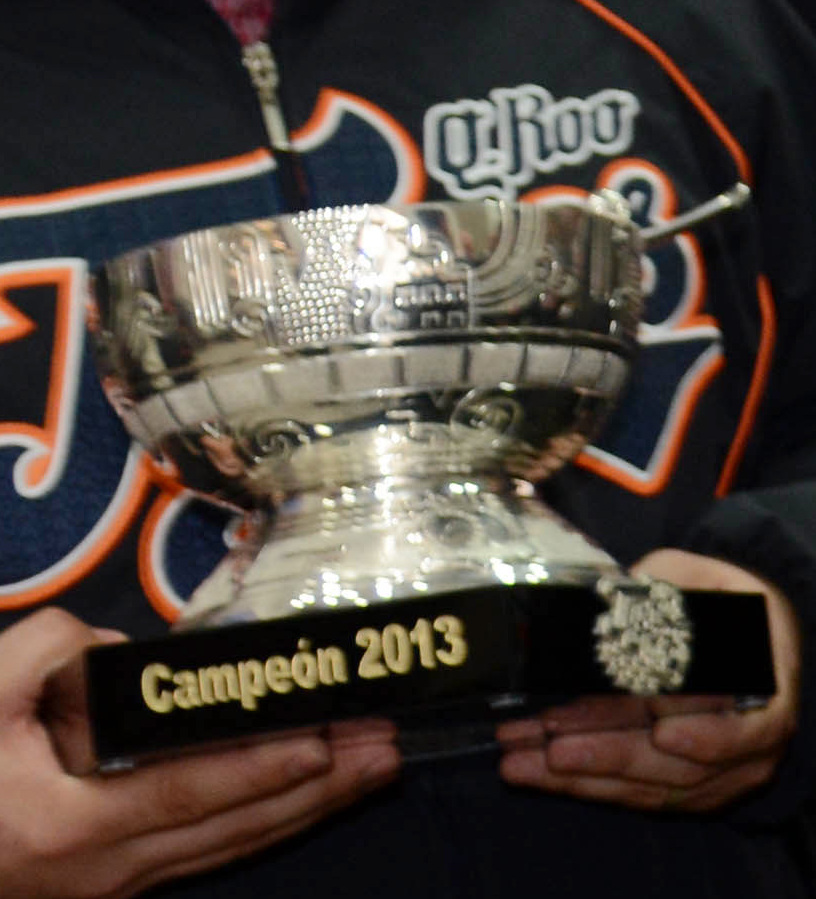
Copa de Zaachila in 2013

The Copa de Zaachila is presented each year by the President of the Mexican Baseball League to the team that wins the Serie del Rey. Recent trophy designs contain the design of a china cup found in the archeological zone of Zaachila, Oaxaca.

== History ==
The current trophy was first awarded in 2000. The previous trophy was copper with gold paint. The original cup is a work of art in itself as well as an archaeological relic that is part of Mexican history. The relic is a small glass polychrome found in Oaxaca Zaachila. It has a dominant figure of a hummingbird. The hummingbird is linked to an earthly power represented by a serpent and the divine power that is represented in the turquoise blue of the original canopy. Experts speculate it could have been used for offerings, but do not rule out that it was a drinking cup.

== Design ==
The current trophy was designed in 2000 for the 2000 Serie del Rey and made by IZTA Orfebres Mexicanos. It is worth approximately $15,000. It is made of sterling silver. The trophy features a cup and a mockingbird. The base contains an inscription of the year of the series. The new design was presented for the first time at the conclusion of the 2000 Serie del Rey, won by the Saraperos.
