= Will Flynt =

American baseball player

Will Flynt (born November 23, 1967, in Escondido, California) is a former professional baseball player who played professionally in Taiwan and Japan. FLynt played for the Osaka Kintetsu Buffaloes in the Pacific League. He later worked as a coach in the Frontier League.
