= Mexican Baseball League =

Professional baseball league in Mexico

- Current season, competition or edition: 2026 Mexican League season
- Sport: Baseball
- Founded: June 28, 1925; 101 years ago
- President: Horacio de la Vega
- No. of teams: 20
- Country: Mexico (Note: The Tecolotes de los Dos Laredos play half their season in the United States.)
- Headquarters: Mexico City, Mexico
- Confederation: WBSC Americas
- Continent: North America
- Most recent champions: Toros de Tijuana (3rd title)
- Most titles: Diablos Rojos del México (18 titles)
- Broadcasters: AYM Sports; Canal Once; Claro (Note: includes Claro Sports); ESPN (Note: includes ESPN 2, ESPN 3, ESPN+, and Star+.); Fox (Note: Games are produced and streamed by Fox Deportes through Tubi); Imagen Televisión; Televisa (Note: Includes Canal 5, Nueve, Las Estrellas, Sky Sports, Vix, TUDN and Izzi Telecom.); TV Azteca (Note: includes Azteca Digital); TVC Deportes (Note: includes TVC Deportes 2)
- Website: lmb.com.mx

The Mexican Baseball League (Spanish: Liga Mexicana de Béisbol, or LMB, lit. 'Mexican Baseball League'), officially known as the Mexican Baseball League Banorte for sponsorship reasons, is a professional baseball league in Mexico. It is the oldest running professional sports league in the country.

The league has 20 teams organized in two divisions, North and South. Teams play 114 games each season. Five teams in each division advance to a four-round postseason tournament that culminates in the Serie del Rey, a best-of-seven championship series between the two division champions. The Mexican League has two affiliated developmental leagues, the Liga Norte de México and Mexican Academy League.

Founded in 1925, LMB grew substantially in the immediate post-World War II era thanks to the efforts of Jorge Pasquel, who greatly increased the quality and visibility of the league by luring players from Major League Baseball (MLB). The conflict between the Mexican League and "organized baseball" was resolved in 1955, when the Mexican League joined the National Association of Professional Baseball Leagues, the predecessor of Minor League Baseball (MiLB), with a Double-A designation; some LMB clubs entered player development contracts with National League teams. Triple-A classification was granted in 1967. As part of a broader reorganization of MiLB, the Mexican League returned to its previous independent status in 2021.

The Mexican League is the ninth-wealthiest professional sports league by revenue in North America, and the second-wealthiest baseball league in the western hemisphere, behind only Major League Baseball. Despite losing Triple-A classification in 2021, it is considered among the more competitive baseball leagues in Latin America.

== League organization ==
From 1925 to the 1960s, the league consisted of about six teams each season. The league expanded to eight teams in the 1960s. In 1970, after the circuit had grown to 10 teams, the league was split geographically for the first time. In 1979, the Mexican Central League was absorbed into the expanded Liga Mexicana de Beisbol (Mexican Baseball League). The newly expanded league featured a 20-team circuit with four divisions. However, after a series of team bankruptcies, the Mexican League was reduced to 14 teams in two divisions.

Although there is a stable core of teams in the league, it is not unusual for clubs to relocate. Often, new incarnations of the teams come about through new owners. Teams also cease after unsatisfactory results or bankruptcy. Since its foundation in 1925, more than 90 teams have passed through the Mexican League, and the only organizations that have remained since their inception are the Sultanes de Monterrey (1939), Diablos Rojos del Mexico (1940), Tigres de Quintana Roo (1955), Saraperos de Saltillo (1970), and Piratas de Campeche (1980). The Acereros del Norte have played uninterrupted since 1982, the Olmecas de Tabasco since 1977, and the Leones de Yucatán since 1979.

== Teams ==
Current Mexican Baseball League team locations:
North Division
South Division

Team	City	Stadium	Capacity	Founded
North Division
Acereros de Monclova	Monclova, Coahuila	Estadio Kickapoo Lucky Eagle	8,500	1974
Algodoneros de Unión Laguna	Torreón, Coahuila	Estadio de la Revolución	7,689	1940
Caliente de Durango	Durango City, Durango	Estadio Francisco Villa	6,000	2024
Charros de Jalisco	Zapopan, Jalisco	Estadio Panamericano	16,500	2014
Dorados de Chihuahua	Chihuahua City, Chihuahua	Estadio Monumental Chihuahua	15,500	1940
Rieleros de Aguascalientes	Aguascalientes City, Aguascalientes	Parque Alberto Romo Chávez	6,496	1975
Saraperos de Saltillo	Saltillo, Coahuila	Estadio Francisco I. Madero	11,000	1970
Sultanes de Monterrey	Monterrey, Nuevo León	Walmart Park	21,803	1939
Tecolotes de los Dos Laredos	Nuevo Laredo, Tamaulipas	Parque la Junta	5,000	1940
Tecolotes de los Dos Laredos	Laredo, Texas	Uni-Trade Stadium	6,000	1940
Toros de Tijuana	Tijuana, Baja California	Toros Mobil Park	17,000	2004
South Division
Bravos de León	León, Guanajuato	Estadio Domingo Santana TV4	6,500	1978
Conspiradores de Querétaro	Huimilpan, Querétaro	Estadio Finsus	6,500	2024
Diablos Rojos del México	Iztacalco, Mexico City	Estadio Alfredo Harp Helú	20,062	1940
El Águila de Veracruz	Veracruz City, Veracruz	Estadio Universitario Beto Ávila	7,319	1903
Guerreros de Oaxaca	Oaxaca City, Oaxaca	Estadio Yu'va	10,500	1996
Leones de Yucatán	Mérida, Yucatán	Parque Kukulcán Alamo	16,000	1954
Olmecas de Tabasco	Villahermosa, Tabasco	Estadio Centenario Orsan	6,600	1975
Pericos de Puebla	Puebla City, Puebla	Estadio Hermanos Serdán	9,200	1938
Piratas de Campeche	Campeche City, Campeche	Estadio Cruz Azul Nelson Barrera	6,000	1980
Tigres de Quintana Roo	Cancún, Quintana Roo	Estadio Sherwin-Williams Beto Ávila	10,285	1955

== Defunct teams ==
The league has lost 12 teams since it was established in 1925.

== Champions ==
Team	Champions	Runners-up	Winning seasons	Runners-up seasons
Diablos Rojos del México	18	17	1956, 1964, 1968, 1973, 1974, 1976, 1981, 1985, 1987, 1988, 1994, 1999, 2002, 2003, 2008, 2014, 2024, 2025	1940, 1941, 1946, 1947, 1957, 1958, 1963, 1966, 1970, 1977, 1991, 1995, 1996, 1997, 2000, 2001, 2011
Tigres de Quintana Roo	12	6	1955, 1960, 1965, 1966, 1992, 1997, 2000, 2001, 2005, 2011, 2013, 2015	1956, 1982, 1999, 2002, 2003, 2009
Sultanes de Monterrey	10	12	1943, 1947, 1948, 1949, 1962, 1991, 1995, 1996, 2007, F2018	1942, 1944, 1953, 1969, 1986, 1994, 2006, 2008, 2013, S2018, 2022, 2024
El Águila de Veracruz	6	4	1937, 1938, 1952, 1961, 1970, 2012	1939, 1960, 1962, 1968
Tecolotes de los Dos Laredos	5	7	1953, 1954, 1958, 1977, 1989	1945, 1955, 1959, 1985, 1987, 1992, 1993
Leones de Yucatán	5	5	1957, 1984, 2006, S2018, 2022	1954, 1989, 2007, 2019, 2021
Pericos de Puebla	5	7	1963, 1979, 1986, 2016, 2023	1948, 1961, 1964, 1965, 2010, 2014, 2017
Azules de Veracruz	4	0	1940, 1941, 1944, 1951	–
Toros de Tijuana	3	1	2017, 2021, 2026	2016
Alijadores de Tampico	3	0	1945, 1946, 1975	–
Algodoneros de Unión Laguna	2	8	1942, 1950	1943, 1949, 1952, 1974, 1976, 1978, 1990, 2023
Saraperos de Saltillo	2	6	2009, 2010	1971, 1972, 1973, 1988, 2004, 2005
Agrario de México	2	2	1935, 1936	1937, 1938
Charros de Jalisco	2	2	1967, 1971	1950, 2025
Tigres de Comintra	2	1	1930, 1933	1935
Cafeteros de Córdoba	2	1	1939, 1972	1975
Piratas de Campeche	2	0	1983, 2004	–
Indios de Ciudad Juárez	1	3	1982	1979, 1983, 1984
Broncos de Reynosa	1	2	1969	1967, 1981
Acereros de Monclova	1	2	2019	1998, 2015
Leones de Obras Públicas	1	1	1931	1930
Rieleros de Aguascalientes	1	1	1978	2012
Guerreros de Oaxaca	1	1	1998	2018
Olmecas de Tabasco	1	1	1993	2026
74 Regimiento de Puebla	1	0	1925	–
Ocampo de Jalapa	1	0	1926	–
Gendarmería de México	1	0	1927	–
Policía del DF	1	0	1928	–
Chiclets Adams de México	1	0	1929	–
Tráfico de México	1	0	1932	–
Monte de Piedad de México	1	0	1934	–
Petroleros de Poza Rica	1	0	1959	–
Bravos de León	1	0	1990	–
Club México	0	2	–	1925, 1927
Pachuca de Hidalgo	0	2	–	1932, 1933
Tuneros de San Luis	0	2	–	1934, 1951
Carmona de México	0	1	–	1926
Bravo Izquierdo de Puebla	0	1	–	1928
Delta de México	0	1	–	1929
Comunicaciones de México	0	1	–	1931
Lomas de México	0	1	–	1936

== Records ==
=== Single season batting ===
Player	Team	Total	Season
Batting average
(Mexico) Alfonso Nieto	Agricultura de México	.476	1937
(United States) Willie Aikens	Ángeles de Puebla	.454	1986
(United States) Rick Renteria	Charros de Jalisco	.442	1991
Home runs
(United States) Chris Carter	Acereros de Monclova	49	2019
(United States) Ty Gainey	Diablos Rojos del México	47	1992
(Mexico) Eduardo Jiménez	Saraperos de Saltillo	45	2000
RBIs
(United States) Willie Aikens	Ángeles de Puebla	154	1986
(United States) Al Pinkston	Diablos Rojos del México	144	1960
(Dominican Republic) Ramón Lora	Truchas de Toluca	127	1984
Hits
(Mexico) Miguel Suárez	Diablos Rojos del México	227	1977
(United States) Al Pinkston	Diablos Rojos del México	225	1960
(United States) Jimmie Collins	Dorados de Chihuahua	206	1979
Stolen bases
(United States) Mike Cole	Ganaderos de Tabasco	100	1989
(United States) Don Carter	Ángeles de Puebla	95	1986
(United States) Tommy Hinzo	Leones de Yucatán	80	1992

=== Single season pitching ===
Player	Team	Total	Season
ERA
(Brazil) André Rienzo	Acereros de Monclova	0.76	2018
(Mexico) Alberto Romo	Agrario de México	0.78	1937
(Cuba) Martín Dihigo	Rojos del Águila de Veracruz	0.90	1938
Wins
(Dominican Republic) Silvano Quezada	Alijadores de Tampico	16	1973
(Mexico) Francisco Montaño	Acereros de Monclova	16	1994
Saves
(Mexico) Luis Ayala	Saraperos de Saltillo	41	1999
(Mexico) José Juan López	Broncos de Reynosa	41	2000
Strikeouts
(Cuba) Ramón López	Sultanes de Monterrey	309	1966

== History ==
=== Beginnings of Mexican baseball ===
Some sources claim that baseball reached Mexican soil because of the US military forces that participated in the US-Mexico War between 1846 and 1848. The last decades of the nineteenth century were beneficial to the baseball boom, while American companies were investing in various sectors of the Mexican economy and their employees were broadcasting the game. The origin of baseball in Mexico City, the capital, dates back to 1887 with the birth of the "Mexican Club", which is undoubtedly the oldest team of the republic. Since the start of the 20th century, baseball has become one of the favorite sports of all of Mexico.

As early as 1925, Mexicans' interest in baseball was such that sports journalist Alejandro Aguilar Reyes and his friend baseball player Ernesto Carmona founded the Mexican League. They had to overcome many difficult obstacles, especially when, on May 26, the rival Mexican Association prepared a "coup" against them, but managed to rebuff it. In the period since, competing leagues have occasionally been formed, but have been absorbed by the LMB, the most famous being Central League in 1979.

=== Popularity and growth ===
The sport's popularity rose immediately and culminated with the first Mexican-born major leaguers.

During the so-called "first stage of the Mexican League," the league attracted several well renowned players from Cuba and the Negro leagues. Cuban ballplayers Martín Dihigo, Lázaro Salazar, Brujo Rossell, and Agustín Bejerano all played in Mexico at some point. The era was mostly dominated by the teams in the central areas of the country, in and around Mexico City. The first champions were Regimiento 74, a team from Puebla. After that, the Championship was only won by teams from the capital city for a decade, with Agrario de Mexico and Tigres de Comintra dominating with two titles each. In the late 30s, when the first wave of Cuban players arrived, teams from the Gulf coast started dominating the league; they were more attractive to Cuban players given their proximity to their home island, with the Cafeteros de Cordoba and the Rojos del Águila de Veracruz winning titles.

Because of the late foundation of the league, there never was a "dead-ball" era, which helped enhance the sport's popularity quickly. This along with the fact that it was only played on weekends, which allowed for easy following on a game-to-game basis, helped the sport grow.

=== 1946: 22 Major Leaguers move to Mexican League ===
In 1946, 22 players from Major League Baseball, including eight members of the New York Giants, moved to the Mexican League.

These moves were motivated by businessman Jorge Pasquel investing more money to raise the profile of the Mexican League and offering contracts which were in some cases higher than American major league contracts. These moves were also motivated by the anticipation of increased competition from former major leaguers who had been serving in World War II and were now returning home.

=== 1949: Landmark ruling of Gardella v. Chandler ===
The U.S. Supreme Court case Federal Baseball Club of Baltimore v. National League of Professional Baseball Clubs held that the baseball leagues and their commissioner are not violating antitrust laws (specifically the Sherman Antitrust Act) when they ban, trade, or otherwise change the playing eligibility of players.

The ruling went untested until the Mexican League was formed. Players who went to play in the Mexican League were blacklisted from Major League Baseball (MLB). One such player, Danny Gardella, was blacklisted because MLB claimed he had violated the reserve clause. On the other hand, Gardella's side claimed he had been fired by Giants player-manager Mel Ott during 1946 spring training because of frequent arguments, primarily about his salary.

During 1948, Gardella brought a claim against Commissioner of Baseball Happy Chandler, the National League and American League, as well as their presidents (Ford Frick and Will Harridge, respectively). Gardella charged that they were engaged in interstate commerce because the defendants had made contracts with radio broadcasting and television companies that sent narratives or moving pictures of the games across state lines. MLB then settled with Gardella and offered all Mexican League jumpers amnesty, protecting the ambiguity of the antitrust protection.

In 1949, Gardella won a major appeal against baseball's reserve clause in the federal courts. This successful appeal is recognized as the first major early step towards baseball free agency.

=== Expansion and MiLB ===
For most of its existence, the league consisted of six to eight teams. During its first few decades most of the league's teams played around Mexico City and the Gulf Coast. The southernmost team being Veracruz, while the northernmost team being Tampico. Most of Mexico City's teams disappeared in the late 1930s, and were replaced by teams all around the country. It wasn't until the 1940s that the League first reached the northern part of the country with the introduction of the Sultanes de Monterrey. Teams in Nuevo Laredo and Torreon soon followed. The west coast first had a team in 1949 with the emergence of the Charros de Jalisco. It still was a difficult region to gain popularity given the presence of the Mexican Pacific League, an important winter league in the northwest of the country.

The emergence of teams in the north was key in expanding the league's popularity. The north followed baseball closely, because of various aspects that all helped its teams thrive and has been the home of the most consistent teams in the league, with the Saraperos, Sultanes and Acereros not having stopped play in over 40 years. For the Sultanes it even resulted in a Minor League partnership with the Dodgers, and played a major role in the league achieving AAA status with the Minor Leagues. This achievement should be attributed mainly to Anuar Canavati, who is considered one of the greatest Mexican baseball executives along Peralta and Harp. His relationship with MiLB was key in the growth of Mexican baseball.

Southern Mexico has also been a bastion of baseball, with both the Tabasco and Campeche teams enjoying consistent attendance due to the sport's popularity. The league first expanded southward with the introduction of the Olmecas de Tabasco in 1975, which was followed by the Piratas de Campeche in 1980, and the Leones de Yucatán in 1979, after a couple of previous unsuccessful attempts. Although the Yucatán Peninsula teams have consistently existed for 40 years, they have enjoyed little successes in comparison with their northern peers, although these southern teams have won seven titles.

In 1979, the Mexican Central League was absorbed into the expanded LMB. The newly expanded league featured a 20-team circuit with four divisions. However, after a series of team bankruptcies, the Mexican League was reduced to 14 teams in two divisions.

=== Rule changes and the introduction of playoffs ===
For the 1970 season, teams were divided into geographic zones to lower travel costs, however it was not until three years later that the league introduced a playoff system for the first time. In 1973 the first of what is now called the Serie del Rey was held. The members of each zone have changed frequently as teams have come and gone (particularly for those teams in a central location), but each zone has maintained a core of the northernmost and southernmost teams. In 1974, the league introduced the designated hitter rule.

=== The 21st century and future expansion ===
The league has found the stability it lacked in the 90s, and has managed to sustain 16 teams for almost two decades, although some teams have relocated, and attendance has been inconsistent, though has rebounded in the latter part of the 2010s with the opening of new ballparks and greater stability. This led to unanimous approval for expansion to 18 clubs.

Despite having cancelled the 2020 season due to the COVID-19 pandemic, in December 2020, Mexican President Andrés Manuel López Obrador announced the addition of two expansion teams to the league: El Águila de Veracruz and the Mariachis de Guadalajara. The league officially approved the additions on 26 January 2021.

In 2023, the league announced that it would introduce a salary cap starting in the 2024 season, in an effort to ensure competitive balance. The league also approved a measure requiring each of its teams to have a minimum of 18 Mexican-born players on their 38-man rosters. That number is expected to increase to 20 in 2026, and to 22 in 2028.

== Uniforms ==
In contrast to Major League Baseball, where teams commonly wear a white uniform at home and a grey uniform for away games with team-color jerseys only worn as alternates, Mexican League teams use a colored option as their regular road jersey, a practice started in the 1970s to attract larger crowds and make teams more recognizable.

== Season structure ==
The current LMB regular season, consisting of 120 games per team, typically begins in late March or early April. Each team's schedule is typically organized into three-game series. Postponed games or continuations of suspended games can result in an ad hoc one-game or five-game series. A team's series are organized into homestands and road trips that group multiple series together. Teams generally play games five to six days per week, commonly having Monday as an off day. Frequently, games are scheduled at night, though Sunday games can be played during the afternoon. In addition, teams play day games frequently on Opening Day, holidays, and getaway days. Each team plays either six or nine games against each opponent.

=== All-Star Game ===
In mid-to-late July, just after the midway point of the season, the LMB All-Star Game is held during a four-day break from the regular-season schedule. The All-Star Game features a team of players from the North Zone, led by the manager of the previous North Serie del Rey team, and a team of players from the South Zone, similarly managed, in an exhibition game. It has been held consistently since 1942 and from that year up until 1971 a team of foreign players battled it out against a team of Mexicans.

The first all-star game took place on August 29, 1939, in the since-demolished Delta Park of Mexico City, in a game between the selections of Ernesto Carmona and Manuel Oliveros. The game ended in 11 innings, 1–0 in favor of the Oliveros team after a walk-off home run.

=== Postseason ===
When the regular season ends at the end of August, between eight and ten teams enter the postseason playoffs. The top four finishers in each zone automatically qualify, however if the fifth place team in a zone finishes three or fewer games back of the fourth place team, that fifth-place team qualifies as a wild card and plays the fourth place team in a single game playoff. That is followed by three additional rounds:

1. The First Playoff: two series per zone, each is a best-of-five-game series.
2. The Zona Norte and Zona Sur Championship Series: each is a best-of-seven-game series between the winners of each Zone's First Playoff series
3. The Serie del Rey: a best-of-seven-game series between each zone's champion.

Within each zone the first seed (the team with the best record) will face the fourth seed on the First Playoff, while the second and third seeds face each other. Since 2017, home-field advantage in the Serie del Rey is determined by regular-season records of the two zone champions, replacing a system used previously where the champion of the zone that won the All-Star Game would receive home-field advantage.

== Performance-enhancing drugs ==
Similar to MLB, the Mexican League has had issues with performance-enhancing drugs by several players. Between 2012 and 2016, 45 players tested positive at the Mexican League's Prevention and Control of Substances program, all of whom were suspended according to the organized baseball anti-doping rule, headed by the Major Leagues. Even so, the league has been accused of "softening" its anti-doping policy to create a safe space for foreign ballplayers to continue their careers there.

Allegedly, the league allows players to pay a fine equivalent to US$5,000, without suspension to make the positive test "disappear". This has caused controversy among the fans and media who have called for the firing of league president Javier Salinas. As recently as August 2019, a player has tested positive, and a press release informing the media of said situation has been handed out, while protecting the player's name.

== Media coverage ==
=== Television ===
Sky Sports, AYM sports, and TVC Deportes broadcast games from the LMB. Sky Sports is also the official broadcaster of home games for Diablos Rojos del México and Sultanes del Monterrey, making it the channel that has the greatest coverage of the league. Other teams have local broadcasting agreements.

=== Radio ===
La Liga Mexicana de Béisbol has an agreement with Cadena RASA, through which the radio network has the exclusive national radio broadcast rights, including the All-Star Game and the Serie del Rey, as well as any other baseball event of national relevance that is presented. Gustavo Torrero, a well-known baseball commentator on radio and television, provides play-by-play for these broadcasts alongside Javier Figueroa and occasional guest commentators. In addition to this, all teams have their games broadcast on local radio.

=== Internet ===
Since 2014, LMB has had an agreement with AYM Sports to stream some games on the Internet through web page LMB.TV. Likewise, since the 2017 post-season, Cinépolis KLIC has streamed some games.

Additionally, the LMB signed an agreement with Facebook to exclusively broadcast 132 regular-season games and eight playoff games (four for each championship) during its 2018 season through Facebook Live. These streams would be free and would be available from March 22 of that year on the Facebook page of the LMB.

Since 2021 all LMB games have been streamed internationally both live and on demand on Jonron.TV

== See also ==
- Salón de la Fama del Beisbol Profesional de México (Mexican Baseball Hall of Fame)
- Baseball awards
- Mexican Pacific League
- Sport in Mexico
