= Piratas de Campeche =

Logo	Cap insignia

Information
- League: Mexican League (Zona Sur)
- Location: Campeche, Campeche
- Ballpark: Estadio Cruz Azul Nelson Barrera
- Founded: 1980
- Serie del Rey championships: 2 (1983, 2004)
- Colors: Red, white, black
- Ownership: Leon Brener Hellmund
- President: Layda Sansores San Roman
- Media: Televisión y Radio de Campeche (radio and TV), Tribuna de Campeche
- Website: www.piratasmx.com

The Piratas de Campeche (English: Campeche Pirates) are a professional baseball team in the Mexican League (LMB) based in Campeche, Campeche, Mexico.

== History ==
In 1980, the Alacranes de Durango moved to Campeche, and played their home games at Venustiano Carranza Park. Their first season was incomplete as the result of a strike carried out by the league's players. It would not take long for the franchise to find success. In 1981, they finished with a 71–50 record, good for second place in the Zona Sur, and beat the Tigres Capitalinos, 4–1, in the first round before falling to the Diablos Rojos del México in seven games.

In 1983, under player-manager Francisco Estrada, the team achieved its first league title. It won the intra-zone round-robin postseason tournament with a 13–5 record and beat the Indios de Ciudad Juárez in seven games. The team made the playoffs again in 1986. In 1989 and 1990, they reached the zone finals, but lost. Several times in the 1990s, the Piratas made the playoffs and lost in the first round. Estrada's number was the first ever retired by the franchise in 1989.

Between 1998 and 2000, the Piratas played at Leandro Domínguez Park while their normal venue was renovated; the team returned to the renamed and rebuilt Estadio Nelson Barrera in 2001.

Francisco Estrada returned to manage the Piratas to their second title in 2004, finishing second in their zone with a 54–41 record and beating the Olmecas de Tabasco in five games, the Tigres in five, and the Diablos Rojos in seven; they won the LMB championship by defeating the Saraperos de Saltillo in five games.

== Roster ==
Piratas de Campeche roster
Players		Coaches/Other
Pitchers: 73 (United States) Ryan Anderson; 58 (United States) Ross Carver; 61 (United States) Tommy Doyle; 30 (United States) Bernardo Flores ∞; 19 (United States) Dylan Heid; 46 (United States) Kevin Kopps; 11 (United States) Dan Kubiuk; 63 (United States) Anthony Maldonado; 17 (Mexico) José Isidro Márquez; 0 (United States) R. J. Martínez; 12 (United States) Bobby Milacki; 64 (United States) Brandon Quintero; 77 (United States) Joe Record; 51 (United States) Zac Rosscup; 57 (United States) Hector Sepulveda; 78 (United States) Jackson Tetreault; 7 (United States) Tyler Thomas; -- (United States) Jake Thompson ∞; 71 (United States) Darrell Thompson	Catchers: 62 (United States) Phil Clarke ∞; 15 (Mexico) Alejandro Flores; 41 (Dominican Republic) Francisco Peña; 75 (Mexico) Raúl Torres; Infielders: 97 (United States) Armando Alvarez; 85 (Mexico) Japhet Amador; 31 (Mexico) Emmanuel Ávila; 94 (United States) Michael Baca; 53 (Mexico) Jesse Castillo; 65 (Mexico) Jesús Higuera; 96 (United States) Connor Hollis; 13 (United States) Christian Ibarra; 18 (Mexico) Fernando Pérez; 2 (Mexico) Roberto Urías; 3 (United States) Andrew Young ∞; Outfielders: 84 (Dominican Republic) Abraham Almonte; 36 (Mexico) Jesús Fabela; 47 (Mexico) Yordi Martínez; 24 (United States) Cal Mitchell; -- (Cuba) Félix Pérez; 4 (United States) Andrew Stevenson	Manager: 23 (United States) Lloyd McClendon; Coaches: 59 (United States) Glenn Dishman (pitching); 5 (Mexico) Jorge Luis Loredo (third base); 1 (Mexico) Juan José Pacho (bench); 14 (Panama) Rubén Rivera (first base); 66 (United States) Mike Rojas (associate manager); 40 (Mexico) Roque Sánchez (assistant hitting); 37 (Mexico) Francisco Villegas (bullpen); 50 (United States) Dallas Williams (hitting); 7-day injured list; ~ Development list; # Rehab assignment; ∞ Reserve list; ‡ Restricted list; § Suspended list; † Temporarily inactive list; Roster updated September 3, 2026; Transactions; → More rosters: MiLB • Mexican League

=== Retired numbers ===
Nelson
Barrera
1B, 3B
Retired
2002
Francisco
Campos
P
Retired
Héctor
Espino
1B
Retired
1997
Herminio
Domínguez
P
Retired
Paquín
Estrada
C, Manager
Retired
1989
Isidro
Márquez
P
Retired
2021
Fernando
Valenzuela
P
Retired
2019
Roy
Johnson
OF
Retired
2009

== Championships ==
Season	Manager	Opponent	Series score	Record
1983	Francisco Estrada	Indios de Ciudad Juárez	4–3	87–52
2004	Francisco Estrada	Saraperos de Saltillo	4–1	67–47
Total championships			2	

== See also ==
- List of Piratas de Campeche seasons
