= El Águila de Veracruz =

Professional baseball team that plays in the Mexican League

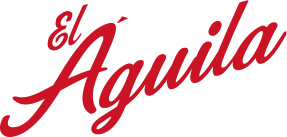

Logo	Cap insignia

Information
- League: Mexican League (South Zone)
- Location: Veracruz, Veracruz, Mexico
- Ballpark: Estadio Universitario Beto Ávila
- Founded: 1903 (original incarnation); 2020 (modern franchise)
- Nickname: El Glorioso (The Glorious)
- League championships: 6 (1937, 1938, 1952, 1961, 1970, 2012)
- Former name: Rojos del Águila de Veracruz
- Colors: Red, white
- Ownership: Territorio Águila de Veracruz S.A. de C.V.
- President: Bernardo Pasquel
- Manager: Gabe Alvarez

Current uniforms
Home	Away

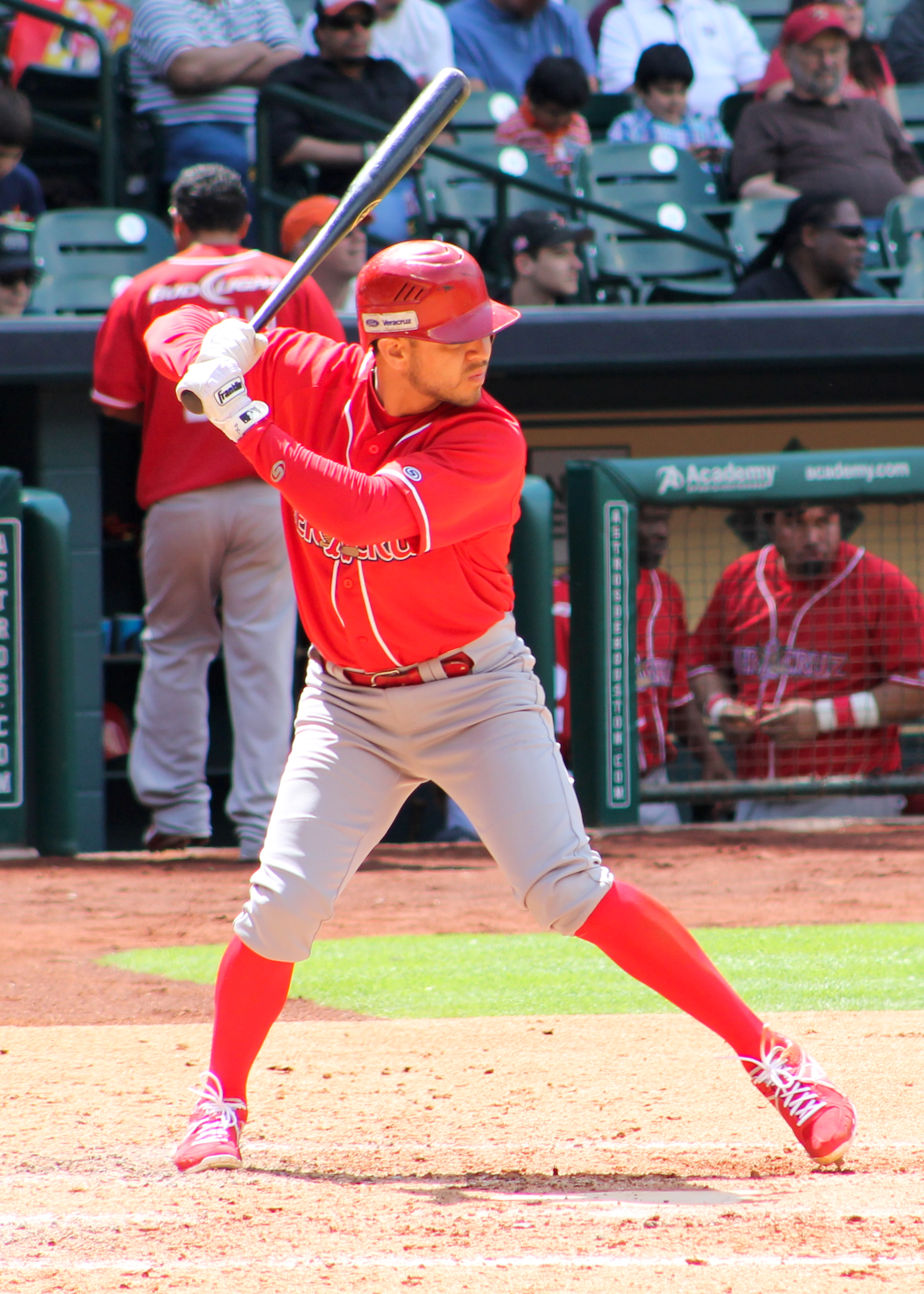
Jose Chavez in a March 2014 exhibition in Houston

El Águila de Veracruz (English: The Eagle of Veracruz) is a professional baseball team that plays in the Mexican League. Based in Veracruz, Mexico, they play their home games at the Estadio Universitario Beto Ávila.

== History ==
Baseball was introduced to Veracruz during the early 20th century by employees of American and British oil companies. Native employees began to take an interest in the games, played by the managers of these companies, who then purchased uniforms for the new players. The uniforms they purchased were red, which had a lasting effect on future baseball teams in Veracruz. Mexican Eagle Petroleum Co., a Mexican oil company now known as Pemex, was the inspiration for the name of the first baseball club founded in Veracruz, the Rojos del Águila ("Reds of the Eagle"), founded on September 16, 1903.

== Beginnings ==
One of the original teams of the Mexican Baseball League, Águila won its first championship titles in 1937 and 1938, when the league was recently organized and began to keep statistics. Agustín Verde was the team's manager at the time. Subsequent titles came in 1952 and 1961, both under The Kangaroo Santos Amaro's management, and Enrique Izquierdo led the team to its fifth win in 1970. Their sixth win in 2012 was under manager Pedro Meré, "El Comemangos" They are one of the most recognized teams in the Mexican League.

Águila played in the Veracruz Sports Park until 1986, when the team retired from the league. When the team returned in 1992, it adopted Estadio Universitario Beto Ávila as the new headquarters.

== Titles ==
=== 1937 ===
The Eagle won their first championship title in 1937, under Cuban Agustín Verde, in an official championship and inaugural Mexican Baseball League game. Martin Dihigo's outstanding performance, both on the pitching mound and in the batter's box, was a major contributing factor to their win. The team included field players Augustine "Pijini" Bejarano, Felino Cardenas Estaquillo Martinez, Martin "El Maestro" Dihigo, Francisco Medina, Alberto Cornejo, Nero Arjona, Donato "Toco" Aldama, Ramon Michelena, Antonio Tenorio, Julian Ramirez Pajón and Agustin Verde; and pitchers Gustavo Ortiz, Martin Dihigo, Sabas Mora and Carlos Rubio. Sabas Mora holds the win–loss record at 7–0 with an ERA of 2.09, and Martin Dihigo is credited with winning the three games in a row needed to win the series.

=== 1938 ===
In 1938, Dihigo led the team to a second title, again directed by Agustín Verde+. Dihigo reached a batting average of .387, and swept the pitching department with 18 wins and 2 losses and an ERA of 0.90, with 184 strikeouts. The team consisted of field players Martin "El Maestro" Dihigo, Silvio Garcia, Jacinto Roque, Manuel Salvatierra, Nero Arjona, José Luis Gómez Rodríguez, Donato "Toco" Aldama, Raul "Chicalón" Mendez, Jorge Rosas, Alberto Cornejo, Amado Alvarez and Julian "Handjob" Ramirez; and pitchers Martin Dihigo, Julian Ramirez, Silvio Garcia, Tirso de Anda and Raul Mendez.

=== 1952: The crown of 1952 ===
The third team title in the Mexican Baseball League was won with another Cuban, Santos "The Kangaroo" Amaro. In this campaign, Santos Amaro led the team to another title with the help of Rene Gonzalez, who achieved the highest batting average of .370, and Peter "Charrascas" Ramirez, Mario Ariosa, Antonio Castanon, Charles White, Earl "Red Skin" Taborn, Guillermo "Huevito" Alvarez, Reynaldo Green, Gonzalo "The Blackout" Morales, Ricardo "Chamaco" (The kid) Garza, Rafael "Chino" Lopez, Jaime "El Loco" (Crazy) Abad, Manuel Fuentes, Octavio Favela, Ernesto Cortes, Federico Cortes, Isidro Ortiz and Santos Amaro himself as field players. In the pitching department, the top player in that season was William "Don Pants" Lopez, who won 19 games for 8 lost, and a 2.94 ERA. Pitching importance followed with Lino Donoso (18 - 11), Guadalupe Ortegón, Fernando Sanchez, Pedro Ramirez and Hector Moreno Marín "Pepino" Azamar.

=== 1961: The power of Al Pinkston ===
Nine years elapsed before the Eagle Reds returned to winning a pennant Mexican Baseball League game in 1961, again under the leadership of Santos Amaro. This season, the magic came with "tremendous thumper" Alfred Pinkston joining the team from the Mexico City Red Devils (Diablos Rojos del Mexico), who, with solid work in the batting order, led the Eagle to conquer a new championship. Pinkston, according to his numbers and to those who were fortunate enough to see him play, was a tremendous player. He hit .374 that year and highlighted the work of the "explosive" Cuban Witremundo "Witti" Quintana, who, that year, was the champion of runs of in league with 23 homers. Equally important in this season were the following batters that were above a .300 percentage: Asdrubal Baro, Miguel "Pilo" Gaspar and William Berzunza, followed by below average "Magic" Felipe Montemayor, Ernesto "Natas" Garcia, Paul Bernard, Mario Ariosa, Ramiro Caballero, Witremundo Quintana, Ronaldo "Ronnie" Camacho, Mario Luna, Juan de Dios Hernández Esquivel and Felipe Villareal. On the pitch, a "legend" was born, a pillar to achieving the team win that season was Ramon "Three Skates" Arano, who managed to earn a record of 11 wins and 3 losses, and a 3.72 ERA. Following in his footsteps were Jesus Williams (11-8), Lino "Chucumite" Donoso (10-6), Silvio Castellanos (14-14), Rodolfo Alvaro (11-6), Guillermo Lopez, Aubrey Grigsbi, Pablo Montes de Oca, Lazaro Uscanga, Guillermo Vazquez, Pedro Julián Ladera, and Montane.

=== 1970: The fifth championship ===
As if it were predestined, it was another 9 years until the team won another championship. El Águila was directed once again by a Cuban, this time Enrique Izquierdo. They had important figures for sure, but overall it was an even year as individual accomplishments go. To highlight the work of Cuban Rogelio "El Borrego" (The lamb) Álvarez, he had 33 runs, was the league champion in that department, and batted a .288 percentage. There were three players who hit over .300 percentage: Emilio Sosa (.328), Roberto "The Engineer" Ortiz (.305) and Rolando Camarero (.304). Other hitters were Nicolás Vazquez, Rogelio Alvarez, Francisco Rodriguez Ituarte, Wilfredo Arano, Francisco Chavez, Enrique Izquierdo, Jose Manuel Hernandez, Porfirio Ruiz, Tobias Santos, Rufino Reyes, Jose Reyes Cruz, Joaquin Santiago, Natanael Alvarado, Ernesto García, Olindo Rojas, Octavio Salgado, Octavio Orozco, Hector Rodriguez, Esteban Valtierra, and Carlos Burgos, and the pitchers were Jesus Rizales (12-6), Cesar Diaz (10-8), Alberto Osorio (10-7), Luis Malpica (9-9), Blas Mazon (13-13) and Ramiro Nuño, Rene "Sabañón" (Chilblain) Chavez, Francisco Lopez, Octavio Salgado, Hector Brito, Raul Balcazar, Juan de Jesus Quintana, Juan Burgos, and Felipe Antonety.

The competition was high that season, with ten teams divided into two zones, the South and the North, where the championship series was between the zone leaders or the champions in each zone. Veracruz won in the final series to the Diablos Rojos del México, 4 games to 2, in the Parque Deportivo Veracruzano.

=== 2012: The sixth star ===
After 42 years without a championship, the team had a successful season in 2011 when they reached the Mexican League Championship Series in the South Zone. The Eagle Reds won the Mexican Baseball League Championship for the sixth time in its history. The manager, Pedro Meré, who took over the team a little after half-way through the season. The "Prince of Mango" continued the work of Puerto Rican Orlando Merced, who was suspended by the league for the rest of the season. Mere, who had won three championships with the Los Tuxtlas Brujos (sorceres) in the Veracruz Winter League, was named as manager in his debut in the Mexican Baseball League, as well as becoming the first Mexican leader of the Ave Roja, as the team's five previous championships were won under Cuban managers.

The Eagle won their sixth championship, on August 29, 2012, taking the seventh game in the series to Rieleros de Aguascalientes (Aguascaliantes Railers), 8–1, in the packed "Beto Ávila" University Sports Park. The Eagle Reds received the Zaachila Cup. With the culmination of a winning season, Governor Javier Duarte de Ochoa later toured the main boulevard of Veracruz thanking the fans for their support. Duarte gave a reception to the new kings of the Mexican Baseball League in the Hall of Flags. Afterwards, there was a meal with the governor, the players, and with the directors of the team. At 6pm, there was a Thanksgiving Mass at the University Sports Park "Beto Ávila", and the edge of 8pm, a convoy of Mexican Baseball League champions paraded through the main streets of Veracruz, where thousands of fans gathered to cheer on their idols. The caravan with new Zaachila Cup holders ran from the Plaza of the Securities to the Malecon Macroplaza. Happy day.

Due to pitcher Tomas Solis' great performance, he was appointed as the Pitcher of the Year, and Dominican Jailen Peguero was recognized as the Reliever of the Year. Finally, in the framework of the XLII Mexican Baseball National Convention held in Villahermossa, Tabasco, Jose Antonio Mansur Galán, chairman of the Board of Directors of the Eagle Reds won Executive of the Year award.

== 1980s ==
After the mid-1970s, Pablo Machado, who was then the owner of the team, decided to take the Eagle to become the Aguascalientes Railroaders. In the early 1980s, the team returned to Veracruz. During that time, the team had among its ranks managers Pazos Fernando Sosa, Armando Rodriguez, "Beto" Ávila, Mario Ariosa, and Carlos Sosa Lagunes. They went unnoticed until the season of 1986, when Evelio Brito (the owner) quit during the same mid-season to disappear at the end of that campaign.

Emphasized during that period include George Brunet, Blas Santana, Fernando Elizondo, Vicente Palacios, Hector Madrigal, and others.

== 1990s ==
After an absence of six years, the Eagle Reds returned to Veracruz in 1992 under the auspices of the organization of Vicente Perez Avellá, and with the support of Dante Delgado Rannauro, governor at the time, Perez Avellá, kept the team competitive during the seasons of 1993 and 1994.

In 1993, the Reds qualified for the postseason, but lost to the Red Devils by 4 games to none in the first round of playoffs.

In 1994, the team qualified to play-off second in the South Zone and won the first postseason series to the Campeche Pirates, 4 games to 3, in a packed University Sports Park "Beto Ávila", which has been the home of the Eagle since 1992, but fell to the Red Devils in the divisional final, 4 games to none.

During the season of 1995, and without the support of the state governor Patricio Chirinos Calero, the team was dismantled mid-season to finally migrate to Veracruz to become the Poza Rica Oilers for 1996.

During the period of 1992 to 1995, famous players included Dominican Manny Hernandez, Miguel Muñoz, Juan Luevano, Leo Meza, Heriberto Garcia, American Matt Stark and Carlos "El Gato" Gastelum, with the debut of Rodrigo Lopez in the Mexican Baseball League.

By the end of 1998, and the beginning of his term, governor Miguel Aleman Velasco announced the return of the Eagle after their 4-year absence for the season 1999 of the Mexican Baseball League. The state government acquired the franchise of the Mayas de Chetumal. By orders of the governor, Antonio Chedraui Mafud was appointed as president of the organization and Gustavo Souza Escamilla as the General Manager.

== 2000s ==
During the management of Antonio Chedraui and Gustavo Souza, the team qualified for the postseason on only two occasions, the campaigns of 2000 and 2002.

In 2000, the Eagle made a big turnaround by getting 2 games to none on the mighty Red Devils, but the Diablos won the next four games, knocking el Águila out in the first round of playoffs.

In 2002, the Reds again qualified for the playoffs, but were swept by the Oaxaca Warriors in the first round.

From 1999 to 2004, some highlighted players include Eleazar Mora, Luis Fernando "Freckles" Morales, Alfredo "Tyson" Meza, American Mark Whiten, and Venezuelan Lino Connel among others.

By the end of 2004, at the beginning of his term of Governor Fidel Herrera Beltran, and after a series of rumors about the possible departure of the team once more, the state government conducted a public opinion survey to determine the future team. At the end of the survey, it was determined that the team would still be owned by 51% to ensure they stay in Veracruz, and sold the remaining 49% stake in Grupo Empresarial Denim sports consultant, whose Mansur was Jose Antonio Beltran, but this partnership with Denim Group lasted only one season, in 2005, later to leave the team management in the hands of José Antonio Beltrán Mansur, owner of 49% shares of the club today.

During this administration, the team has only qualified for the playoffs once, in his first year of administration in 2005.

In 2005, the "Eaglets" rated sixth place in the South Zone (In that season 6 teams qualified per zone). After winning against the Pericos de Puebla to get the last ticket to the postseason, they were left out by the domain tiebreaker between the teams despite there being the same win–loss percentage between the two teams. However, the dream ended quickly for the locals by losing to the Angelópolis Tigers 4–0 in the first round of the playoffs, adding to that 12-game losing streak in elimination playoffs.

During the current administration, the players who excelled and have identified with the fans were Dominican Willis Otáñez, Emigdio Lopez, and Santiago "El Tato" Gonzalez. For the season of 2008, the team reached the former "bigleaguer" José Offerman.

== 2010s ==
Currently, the Eagle Reds have been light and dark with respect to their sports. They had one of their worst seasons in 2010 and obtained a record of 39 won to 66 lost, and a percentage of .371. They were also the second to last of the league, just above the Nuevo Laredo Tecolotes (New Laredo Owls), who had a .308 percentage. Despite the poor season, Dominican Victor Diaz and Jorge Guzman, leader and second leader of runs in the Mexican Baseball League, qualified with 29 and 22 respectively. In addition, Diaz was also the leader of careers produced with 96.

During the 2011 season, Francisco Mendez and Manuel Bobadilla made the Mexican Baseball League Reds' draft, both from the Dorados de Chihuahua. Subsequently, so did the services of experienced pitcher Juan Acevedo. These reinforcements, combined with some good players already in the club, made the team receive third place in the South Zone with a new record of 54 won by 49 lost, and a percentage of .524. Furthermore, the Eagle led the in league pitching with a 4.24 team ERA. All of this happened under the direction of Manager Daniel Fernandez, who was hired for this campaign.

In the single line for the second consecutive season for the team, Jarocho had among its ranks the leader who runs the Mexican Baseball League, this time the Ensenada Jorge Guzman, who hit 39 homers. It is worth mentioning that in addition to the home run lead, the "Black" won a record of more home runs than Guzmán hit by an Eagle player, surpassing the 33 who Cuban Rogelio "Borrego" Alvarez had previously managed in 1970, and American Mark Whiten in the 2001 season. In addition to Jorge Guzman, who also managed 97 RBIs, some of the players who stood out in this campaign were Victor Diaz, who hit 34 homers and got 89 RBIs, and pitcher Joel Vargas, who scored 11 wins and an ERA of 3.60.

In the first round of the playoffs, the Ave Roja faced the Campeche Pirates, who they defeated in a tight series of 4 games to 3, achieving qualification for the Southern Zone Championship Series as a visitor in the Estadio Nelson Barrera Romellón of Campeche. The Reds had not won a playoff series since the campaign of 1994, in which they coincidentally defeated the Pirates in 7 games themselves. However, on that occasion were they classified as local in the University Sports Park "Beto Ávila" of Veracruz. In the Southern Zone Championship Series, the Eagle lost to the Quintana Roo Tigers by 4 games to 2, thus ending a great season for the team.

At the conclusion of the 2012 regular season, the team finished in second place in the South Zone with a record of 67 wins, 44 lost and 1 tie for a percentage of .604. They were also the best pitching group of the league, with a 3.69 ERA, winning this department for the second consecutive season. Collective pitching also had 12 shutouts, while also winning the league lead in this area. Another of the categories they won was the pitching, with 990.2 innings pitched, and the saves with 36, the latter shared with the Tabasco Olmecs. (Olmecas de Tabasco) The last time the squad porteña had played up to .600 was in 1952, 60 years ago when they were champions for the third time in the circuit.

== Postseason 2012 ==
In the first round of the playoffs, the Eagle defeated the Tabasco Olmecs by 4 games to 1, thus passing through to the Zona Sur Championship Series for the second consecutive season.

In the South Division Championship Series the Ave Roja defeated the Quintana Roo Tigers by 4 games to 2, reaching the Final Series of the Mexican Baseball League ("King Series") after 42 years of dormancy.

In the Serie del Rey, the Eagle Reds faced the Aguascalientes Railroaders, who they defeated in a tight final series of 4 games to 3, achieving Jarocho a team win since their sixth championship in the Mexican Baseball League. The MVP trophy went to Dominican pitcher Lorenzo Barcelo, who won two key victories in Serie del Rey. The nomination for Barceló, who finished the playoffs with a 6–0 record, was a distinction just over Veracruz Humberto Sosa, who wore five gunboat produced in Game 4 and key battles in Game 6.

== Leaving Veracruz ==
El Águila played their final season in Veracruz in 2017. Poor attendance, which worsened in 2017, forced the team's relocation to Nuevo Laredo, Tamaulipas, where they rebranded as the returning Tecolotes de los Dos Laredos in 2018.

== Return to LMB ==
On October 31, 2020, Governor of Veracruz Cuitláhuac García first announced that the franchise would return to Veracruz in 2021. Under new leadership, they will be known as El Águila de Veracruz.

The announcement was made official by Mexican President Andrés Manuel López Obrador in December 2020, when he unveiled El Águila and the Mariachis de Guadalajara as two new expansion teams that would enter the league in 2021. The league approved the additions on January 26, 2021.

== Current roster ==
El Águila de Veracruz roster
Players		Coaches/Other
Pitchers: -- Fabián Anguamea ∞; -- Amilcar Arano ∞; -- Luarbert Arias ∞; 2 Jonathan Bermúdez; 40 Bryce Bonnin; 71 Chase Cohen; 26 Norman Elenes; 45 Jeff Ibarra; 12 Mario Jiménez; 29 Dinelson Lamet; 96 Luis Márquez; 59 Cristopher Molina; 48 Fernando Olguín; 46 Yorvin Pantoja; 38 Omar Sainz; -- Ángel Sánchez ∞; 28 Austin Schulfer; 18 Braulio Torres-Pérez; 98 Alejandro Trujillo ∞; 39 César Vargas; 43 Jack Weisenburger; 35 Gabriel Ynoa	Catchers: 44 Matt Scheffler; 75 José Torres ∞; 9 Chris Williams; Infielders: 36 Andrés Álvarez; 68 Kristian Delgado; 6 César Izturis Jr.; 29 José Miranda; 27 Roberto Ramos; -- Rio Ruiz; 23 Austin Shenton; Outfielders: 56 Wynton Bernard; 71 Eric de la Rosa; 41 Daniel Montaño; -- Dwight Smith Jr.	Manager: -- Gabe Alvarez; Coaches: -- Kevin Flores (first base/infield); -- Heber Gómez (third base/infield); -- Eleazar Mora (pitching); -- Héctor Navarro (bullpen); -- Carlos Rivera (hitting); -- Mario Santana (bench/catching); 7-day injured list; ~ Development list; # Rehab assignment; ∞ Reserve list; ‡ Restricted list; § Suspended list; † Temporarily inactive list; → More rosters: MiLB • Mexican League
