= Saraperos de Saltillo =

Professional baseball team in the Mexican League

Logo
Cap insignia

Information
- League: Liga Mexicana de Béisbol (North Zone)
- Location: Saltillo, Coahuila, Mexico
- Ballpark: Estadio de Béisbol Francisco I. Madero (1970–present)
- Founded: 1970
- Nickname(s): El Sarape (The Serape); Nave verde (Green Machine)
- Serie del Rey championships: 3 (1980, 2009, 2010)
- Colors: Teal, black, grey, white
- President: César Cantú García
- Manager: Lloyd McClendon
- Website: Official website

The Saraperos de Saltillo (English: Saltillo Serapes) are a professional baseball team in the Mexican League. Their home ballpark is the Estadio de Béisbol Francisco I. Madero in Saltillo, Coahuila. They have won three championships (1980, 2009, and 2010). The 1979 Saraperos were recognized as one of the 100 greatest minor league teams of all time.

== History ==
The Saraperos joined the Mexican League in 1970. The team was developed during a dinner held by the members of the Committee for Construction of the Cathedral of Saltillo, led by its president, Don Jorge Torres Casso. Initial discussions concerned the cost of the franchise, including purchase of players.

With the support of the Governor and the Mayor of Saltillo, the Saraperos organized with Don Jorge Torres Casso as president, Mr. Flavio Trevino, Javier López del Bosque and Gustavo Lara Ramos as vice-presidents, Eleazar Galindo as treasurer and Flores Valdez Eustolio as secretary.

The team made its debut in the Mexican League (LMB) on 18 March 1970 defeating the Sultanes de Monterrey 6–3 in the Parque Cuauhtémoc in Monterrey. The winning pitcher for the Saraperos was Carmelo Aquino and the losing pitcher for the Sultanes was Jim Horford. The Saraperos–Sultanes would later become and LMB rivalry known as the Clásico del Norte (Northern Classic).

The Saraperos had successful seasons during the 1970s, reaching the league play-offs and finishing as runners-up in 1971, 1972, and 1973. The 1980 season was suspended due to a player's strike, known as "The Curse of the Anabe". The Mexican League decided to conduct a special season mini-championship, won by the Saraperos. The Saraperas were runners-up again in 1988, losing to the Mexican Red Devils in 5 games.

In late 1998, Sinaloan Juan Manuel Ley purchased the franchise from Javier Siller Saltillo. This marked the beginning of a new era for the team. After this purchase the home stadium, Estadio Francisco I. Madero, underwent major renovations to expand capacity, all games were broadcast on a local television network in Saltillo, and promotions began to entice families to attend games. The 1999 season was a resounding success with Saltillo Plaza as the most attended game of the season and after three years without a postseason (1996-8) they qualified for the playoffs with third place in the General Table quarterfinals, but were eliminated after 6 games against the Campeche Pirates. During the semifinals, the Saraperos faced the Mexico Red Devils in 7 intense games; the Red Devils went on to win the championship of the 1999 season.

The Saraperos were the most successful club in the 1999-2005 phase of the Mexican League, leading in club attendance at the league level and qualifying for the playoffs in all 7 seasons of that period, playing exciting postseason series. Notably, the Sarapera roster included the renowned pitcher Luis Ayala during this era. It was said that there was a curse on the Saraperos of Saltillo during this time: "Saraperos will not be champions until Francisco Paquin Estrada Saltillo is the manager." Estrada Saltillo was the manager of the Pirates of Campeche, to whom the Saraperos lost in the 2004 championship final. Although they lost the final of 2004, the Saraperos were the two-time champions of the Northern Zone (Finals runner up), with titles won in 2004 and 2005. Their high level of play continued with additional play-offs qualifications in 2006–2013. Despite the team "curse", the Saraperos won the league championship in the 2009 season, led by manager Orlando Sanchez. These finals were won after 6 games against the Tigres de Quintana Roo. In 2010, they returned to the championship to defend their title, winning in 5 games against rivals Pericos de Puebla.

== Stadium ==
The Estadio de Béisbol Francisco I. Madero, is a baseball stadium that is part of the Ciudad Deportiva Francisco I. Madero in Saltillo, Coahuila. It was built in 1964 and is located on the corner of Boulevard Jesus Valdez Sanchez Nazario Ortiz Garza Blvd, east of the city. Over the years, the stadium has undergone several changes including the expansion of its seating capacity from 7,500 to its current 16,000 in late 1998. Prior to the 2011 season, about $87 billion, funded by the State Government of Coahuila and the team, were invested to renovate the stadium.

The Mexican League All-Star Game was held at the stadium in 1986, 2002, and 2011. The 2002 event was an international match between the teams of Mexico and Cuba.

== Current roster ==
Saraperos de Saltillo roster
Players		Coaches/Other
Pitchers: 40 (United States) Jeff Brigham; 75 (Mexico) Aníbal Cervantes∞; 57 (Puerto Rico) Alex Claudio; 49 (Mexico) Jesús Cruz; 14 (United States) Fin Del Bonta-Smith; 63 (Venezuela) Wilmer Font; 65 (Dominican Republic) Luis Frías; 83 (Mexico) Sergio García-Repper; 35 (United States) Matthew Givin; 46 (Venezuela) Deolis Guerra; 77 (Mexico) Iván Izaguirre; 39 (Puerto Rico) Jorge López; 72 (United States) Zach Mort; -- (Mexico) Luis Payán; 41 (United States) Erich Uelmen; 66 (Mexico) Edwyn Valle	Catchers: 46 (Venezuela) Oscar Campos; 38 (Mexico) José Lizárraga; 81 (Mexico) Jorge Morales; 67 (Mexico) Daniel Sánchez∞; 2 (United States) Donny Sands; Infielders: 33 (United States) Chris Carter; -- (Puerto Rico) Iván Castillo ∞; 29 (Venezuela) Thairo Estrada; 13 (Venezuela) Luis Guillorme; 4 (Mexico) Ramón Ríos; 10 (Puerto Rico) Emmanuel Rivera; 15 (United States) Niko Vásquez; 22 (Mexico) Christian Villanueva; 92 (Mexico) Brandon Villarreal; Outfielders: -- (United States) Greg Allen ∞; 24 (Cuba) Oscar Colás; 51 (Cuba) J. P. Martínez; 61 (Mexico) Christian Morales ∞; 48 (United States) River Town; 8 (Mexico) Fernando Villegas	Manager: -- (Puerto Rico) José Molina; Coaches: 64 (Mexico) Leobardo Arauz (first base); -- (United States) Darryl Brinkley (hitting); -- (Dominican Republic) Julian Martínez (catching); 4 (Mexico) Luis Carlos Martinez (third base); -- (Mexico) Vicente Palacios (pitching); -- (Mexico) Juan Carlos Uribe (bullpen); -- (Puerto Rico) José Valentín (bench); 7-day injured list; ~ Development list; # Rehab assignment; ∞ Reserve list; ‡ Restricted list; § Suspended list; † Temporarily inactive list; Roster updated July 14, 2026; Transactions; → More rosters: MiLB • Mexican League
