= Guerreros de Oaxaca =

Logo	Cap insignia

Information
- League: Liga Mexicana de Béisbol (Southern Division)
- Location: Oaxaca City, Oaxaca
- Ballpark: Estadio Yu'va
- Founded: 1996
- Serie del Rey championships: 1 (1998)
- Colors: Black and white
- Mascot: Tato
- Ownership: Fundación Alfredo Harp Helú
- President: Guillermo Spíndola Morales
- Manager: Asdrúbal Cabrera
- Website: www.guerreros.mx

Current uniforms
Home	Away

The Guerreros de Oaxaca (English: Oaxaca Warriors) are a professional baseball team in the Mexican League based in Oaxaca City, Oaxaca, Mexico. Their home field is Estadio Yu'va.

== History ==
In October 1995, a group of businessmen, led by Alfredo Harp Helú, learned that the Charros de Jalisco were unable to continue participating in the Mexican League. These businessmen saw the opportunity to move the team from Guadalajara to the city of Oaxaca, and the project was officially presented at a meeting of directors of the league. The franchise move was officially accepted in December of that year. This was the first time that Oaxaca had a professional sports team.

The Guerreros, as they were named, played their first game on 14 March 1996 against the Petroleros de Minatitlán in the Parque 18 de marzo de 1938, under the direction of manager Alfredo Ortiz. The team recruited Mexican batter Nelson Barrera for its inaugural season.

The Guerreros won their first and only league championship in 1998 by sweeping Acereros de Monclova in the final series.

Former Major League Baseball player Oscar Azócar played for the Warriors in 2000.

== Roster ==
Guerreros de Oaxaca roster
Players		Coaches/Other
Pitchers: -- Garrett Alexander; -- Cristian Alvarado; 77 Reid Birlingmair; 44 Edwar Colina; 65 William Cuevas; 46 Enderson Franco; 29 Conner Greene; 32 Alemao Hernández; 62 Ángel Hernández; 37 José Hernández; 22 James Kaprielian; 58 Radhames Liz; 52 Eduardo Mares; 45 Luis Fernando Miranda; 51 Víctor Morales; 90 Chester Pimentel; 15 Daniel Ponce de Leon; 93 Oscar Valenzuela; 48 Drew VerHagen; 11 Thyago Vieira	Catchers: 14 Carlos Garzón; 97 Andrés Sosa; 28 Ricardo Valenzuela; Infielders: 2 Alexi Amarista; 38 Pedro Castellano; 3 Jorge Flores; 8 Sebastián García; 5 Juniel Querecuto; 27 Juan Santana; 26 Leonel Valera; Outfielders: 56 Aristides Aquino; 18 Luis Barrera; 31 Yonathan Daza; 7 Alfredo López; 15 Mel Rojas Jr.; 24 José Carlos Ureña	Manager: -- Javier Valentín; Coaches: 2 Iván Cervantes (third base); -- Mike Garcia (pitching); -- Alex González (outfield); -- Oswaldo Morejón (bench); -- Guillermo Navarro (catching); -- Edgar Osuna (bullpen); 17 Javier Valentín (hitting); 7-day injured list; ~ Development list; # Rehab assignment; ∞ Reserve list; ‡ Restricted list; § Suspended list; † Temporarily inactive list; Roster updated August 4, 2026; Transactions; → More rosters: MiLB • Mexican League

=== Retired numbers ===
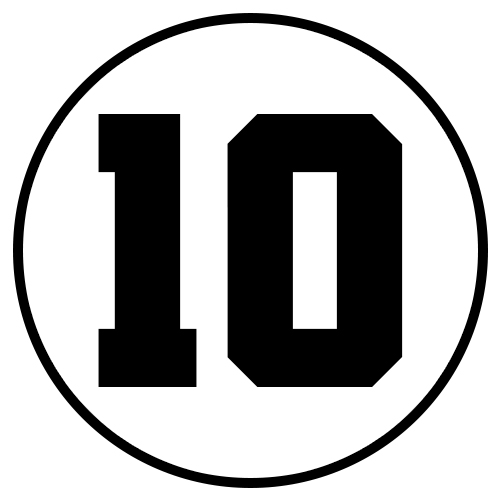
Jaime
Brena
2B
Retired
2019
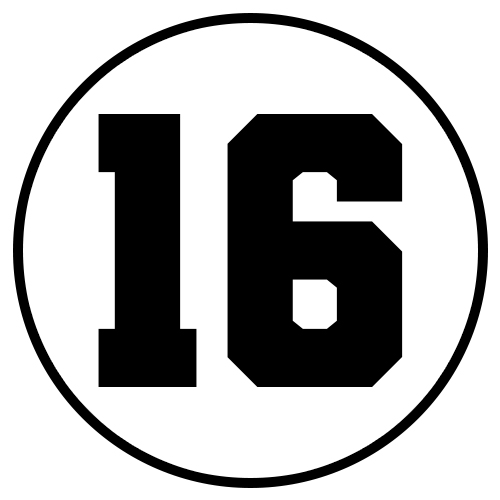
Nelson
Barrera
1B, 3B
Retired
2002
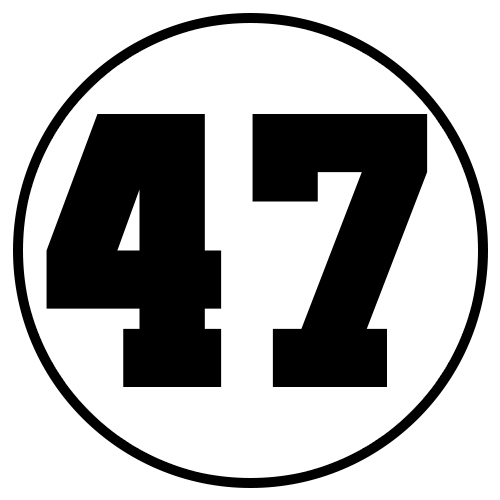
Adolfo
"Tribilín" Cabrera
Coach
Retired
2006
