= Tigres de Quintana Roo =

Professional baseball team based in Cancún, Mexico

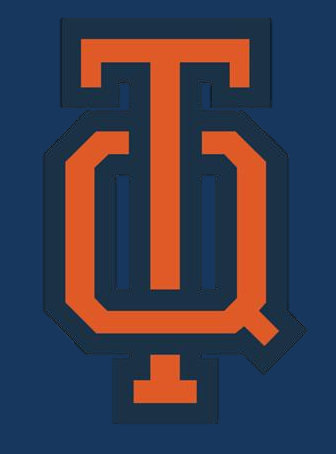
Logo	Cap insignia

Information
- League: Liga Mexicana de Beisbol (Zona Sur)
- Location: Cancún, Quintana Roo
- Ballpark: Estadio Sherwin-Williams Beto Ávila
- Founded: 1955
- Nickname: "El equipo que nació campeón"
- League championships: 12 (1955, 1960, 1965, 1966, 1992, 1997, 2000, 2001, 2005, 2011, 2013, 2015)
- Division championships: 18 (1955, 1956, 1960, 1965, 1966, 1982, 1992, 1997, 1999, 2000, 2002, 2001, 2003, 2005, 2009, 2011, 2013, 2015)
- Former name: Tigres de la Angelópolis (2002–2006); Tigres Capitalinos
- Former ballparks: Parque del Seguro Social (1955–1999); Foro Sol (2000–2001); Parque Hermanos Serdan (2002–2006)
- Colors: Navy blue, orange, white
- President: Fernando Valenzuela Burgos
- Manager: Joseph Thurston
- Media: 106.7FM, 105.1FM
- Website: tigresqroo.com

The Tigres de Quintana Roo (English: Quintana Roo Tigers) are a professional baseball team in the Mexican League based in Cancún, Quintana Roo, Mexico. The team is part of the Southern Division (Zona Sur). The team has won 12 championships: 1955, 1960, 1965, 1966, 1992, 1997, 2000, 2001, 2005, 2011, 2013, and 2015.

The Tigres were founded in Mexico City in 1955 as the Tigres del México (English: Mexico Tigers), and played there through the 2001 season. After a brief stint in Puebla as the Tigres de la Angelópolis, the team relocated to Cancún. The team was founded by industrial businessman Alejo Peralta, and was long owned by his son, Carlos Peralta. The team was purchased by an ownership group including Major League Baseball All-Star pitcher Fernando Valenzuela in 2017.

They have rivalry known as the Guerra Civil (Civil War) against their former crosstown rivals the Diablos Rojos del México. The Tigres won the Mexican League championship in their inaugural season, an achievement that was dubbed: "El equipo que nació campeón" (English: The team that was born as champion). The Tigres have won 18 division and 12 league championships since their inception.

== Franchise history ==
On 14 April 1955, the Tigres made their debut at the Julio Molina ballpark in Mérida, Yucatán under manager George Genovese.

In 1966, the Tigres toured Japan, losing all their 13 games played against Japanese teams.

=== Tigres Capitalinos ===
The Tigres played in Mexico City from its inception until 2001, when the team moved to Puebla City. The team was known as Tigres del México or Tigres Capitalinos. During these years, the team played at the Parque del Seguro Social and later at the Foro Sol, starting in 2000, after the Parque del Seguro Social was demolished in order to build a shopping mall.

On their last two seasons in Mexico City, the Tigres won back to back championships, defeating rivals Diablos Rojos del México.

=== Move to Puebla ===
In 2002, the team moved to Puebla and changed its name to Tigres de la Angelópolis.

=== 50th anniversary season ===
In commemoration of their first 50 years of competition, an alternate logo was designed in 2005. The Tigres played their 50th season relying only on Mexican players, making the championship more significant. Furthermore, the 2005 season was named "Ing. Alejo Peralta" in memory of the Tigres' founder and father of the then-owner.

=== New home for 2007 ===
At the end of the 2006 season, the club's president, Carlos Peralta, announced that the team would move to the city of Cancún, Quintana Roo. The team was renamed the Quintana Roo Tigres, and began play in Beto Ávila Stadium.

=== Carrillo and Vizcarra era (2009–present) ===
For the 2009 season, Enrique "Che" Reyes was replaced by Matías Carrillo as manager. Carrillo, a former major league player for the Florida Marlins, had been a successful player for Tigres from the late 1990s to the mid-2000s having won five championships as player. The Tigres continued to be a competitive squad under Carrillo and reached the 2009 final series, but lost to Saraperos de Saltillo. It was two years later, in 2011, when the team reached the final once more, this time facing their perennial rival: the Diablos Rojos del Mexico.

==== 2011 championship ====
In 2011, the Tigres and Diablos would play their eighth finals series against each other since 1966. The Tigres entered the 2011 series as an underdog. Nevertheless, the best-out-of-seven series ended with a 4–0 sweep against Diablos before a sell-out crowd (with a large presence of Tigres supporters) at Foro Sol.

==== 2013 championship ====
Despite injuries to key Tigres players, the team won its eleventh championship against the Sultanes de Monterrey, 4–1, in a best-out-of-seven series.

== Championship games ==
Season	Champion	Series	Runner up
1955	Tigres del México	2–0	Tecolotes de Nvo. Laredo
1956	Diablos Rojos del México	—	Tigres Capitalinos
1960	Tigres del México	—	Águila de Veracruz
1965	Tigres del México	—	Pericos de Puebla
1966	Tigres del México	4–2	Diablos Rojos del México
1982	Indios de Ciudad Juárez	4–0	Tigres Capitalinos
1992	Tigres del México	4–2	Tecolotes de los Dos Laredos
1997	Tigres del México	4–1	Diablos Rojos del México
1999	Diablos Rojos del México	4–2	Tigres Capitalinos
2000	Tigres del México	4–1	Diablos Rojos del México
2001	Tigres del México	4–2	Diablos Rojos del México
2002	Diablos Rojos del México	4–3	Tigres de la Angelopolis
2003	Diablos Rojos del México	4–1	Tigres de la Angelopolis
2005	Tigres del Puebla	4–2	Saraperos de Saltillo
2009	Saraperos de Saltillo	4–2	Tigres de Quintana Roo
2011	Tigres de Quintana Roo	4–0	Diablos Rojos del México
2013	Tigres de Quintana Roo	4–1	Sultanes de Monterrey
2015	Tigres de Quintana Roo	4–1	Acereros del Norte

== Logos and colors ==
The Tigres' former logo in Mexico City

Tigres' former logo in Cancún

== Roster ==
Tigres de Quintana Roo roster
Players	Coaches/Other
Pitchers: 20 (Venezuela) Melvi Acosta; 72 (Dominican Republic) José Adames; 47 (Mexico) Ernesto Borges; 69 (Mexico) Enrique Castillo; 52 (Dominican Republic) Moisés Díaz; 70 (Cuba) Onelki García; 45 (Dominican Republic) Joan González; 37 (Mexico) Ariel Gracia; 16 (United States) Adrián Herrera; 44 (United States) Trevor Kelley; 88 (Mexico) Alberto Leyva; 58 (Mexico) Jonathan Partida; 93 (Mexico) Pedro Peniche ∞; 40 (Dominican Republic) Henry Sosa; 49 (Mexico) Vicente Valenzuela; 32 (Venezuela) Michele Vassalotti; 31 (United States) Collin Wiles; 67 (Dominican Republic) Juan Zapata; Catchers: 50 (Mexico) Miguel Ojeda Jr.; 26 (Mexico) Alexis Wilson; Infielders: 0 (Cuba) Diosbel Arias; 3 (Venezuela) Manuel Boscán; 82 (Mexico) Aldo Flores; 19 (Mexico) Christopher Gastélum; 71 (Mexico) Roberto González; 13 (Mexico) Diego Madero; 17 (United States) J. J. Matijevic; 73 (Dominican Republic) Rainer Núñez; 77 (Mexico) Carlos Urías ∞; 8 (United States) Troy Viola; Outfielders: 77 (Puerto Rico) Danny Ortiz	Manager: -- (United States) Joseph Thurston; Coaches: -- (Mexico) Carlos Álvarez (third base); -- (Venezuela) Raúl Chávez (bench); -- (Mexico) Sergio Contreras (hitting); -- (Mexico) Martín Enríquez (pitching); -- (Mexico) Wilbert Ortega (bullpen); -- (Mexico) Heriberto Salas (first base); 7-day injured list; ~ Development list; # Rehab assignment; ∞ Reserve list; ‡ Restricted list; § Suspended list; † Temporarily inactive list; Roster updated August 4, 2026; Transactions; → More rosters: MiLB • Mexican League

== Retired numbers ==
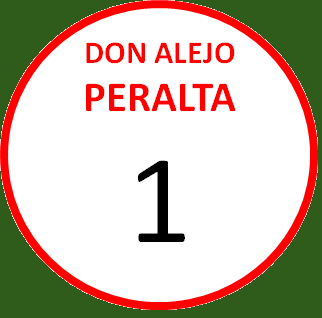
Alejo
Peralta
President

Retired
April 8, 1997
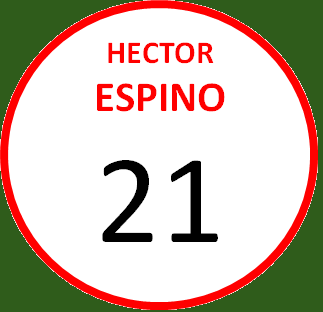
Héctor
Espino
1B

Retired
June 6, 1998
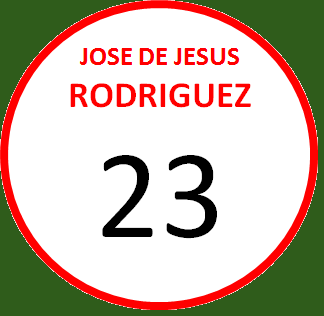
José de Jesús
Rodriguez
SS

Retired August 9, 2010
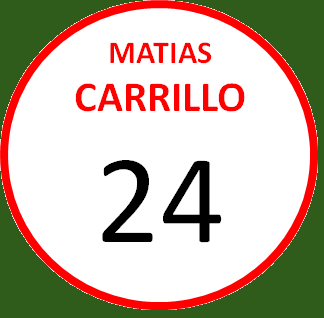
Matías
Carrillo
OF

Retired August 9, 2010

== Mexican Baseball Hall of Famers ==
The following Hall of Famers played and/or managed for the Tigres.

Name	Position	Year of induction	Reference
Alejo Peralta	Owner	1983	
Arnoldo "Kiko" Castro	Second baseman	1995	
Aurelio Rodríguez	Third baseman	1995	
Benjamín Cerda	Third baseman	2007	
Beto Ávila	Second baseman	1971	
Celerino Sánchez	Third baseman	1994	
Felipe Montemayor	Center fielder	1983	
Fermín "Burbuja" Vázquez	Second baseman	2003	
Francisco "Chico" Rodríguez	Shortstop	2004	
Francisco Maytorena	Pitcher	1999	
George Brunet	Pitcher	1999	
Gregorio Luque	Catcher	1999	
Guillermo "Memo" Garibay	Manager	1977	
Jack Pierce	First baseman	2001	
Jaime Corella	Catcher	1991	
José Bache	Second baseman	1983	
Leonardo "Leo" Rodríguez	Third baseman	1980	
Lino Donoso	Pitcher	1988	
Miguel Sotelo	Pitcher	1985	
Miguel Suarez	Right fielder	1994	
Miguel Fernández Becerril	Center fielder	1984	
Oscar Rodríguez	Center fielder	1993	
Roberto Méndez	Second baseman	2000	
Rodolfo "Rudy" Sandoval	Catcher	2001	
Ronaldo "Ronnie" Camacho	First baseman	1983	
Sergio Robles	Catcher	2006	
Vicente Romo	Pitcher	1992	

== Notable players ==
- Julio Franco (First Baseman)
- Tyler Herron (1986-2021) (Pitcher)
- Fernando "el Pulpo" Remes (Shortstop)
- Ismael Valdez (Pitcher)
- Pablo Ortega (Pitcher)
- Karim García (Outfielder)
- Jorge Cantú (Infielder)
- Daryle Ward (First baseman/Outfielder)
