= 2013 Mexican Baseball League season =

2013 Mexican League season
- League: Mexican League
- Sport: Baseball
- Duration: March 22 – August 29
- Teams: 16

Serie del Rey
- Champions: Tigres de Quintana Roo
- Runners-up: Sultanes de Monterrey
- Finals MVP: Albino Contreras

LMB seasons
- ← 2012 2014 →

The 2013 Mexican League season was the 89th season in the history of the Mexican League. It was contested by 16 teams, evenly divided in North and South zones. The season started on 22 March with the match between 2012 season champions Rojos del Águila de Veracruz and Olmecas de Tabasco and ended on 29 August with the last game of the Serie del Rey, where Tigres de Quintana Roo defeated Sultanes de Monterrey to win the championship.

== Standings ==
North
Rank	Team	W	L	Pct.	GB	STK
1	Saraperos de Saltillo	63	50	.558	—	W3
2	Sultanes de Monterrey	62	50	.554	0.5	L1
3	Pericos de Puebla	58	48	.547	1.5	W1
4	Diablos Rojos del México	58	51	.532	3.0	L1
5	Acereros de Monclova	53	57	.482	8.5	W4
6	Rieleros de Aguascalientes	53	58	.477	9.0	L1
7	Broncos de Reynosa	53	60	.469	10.0	L1
8	Vaqueros de la Laguna	51	60	.459	11.0	W1

South
Rank	Team	W	L	Pct.	GB	STK
1	Delfines de Ciudad del Carmen	63	46	.578	—	L2
2	Guerreros de Oaxaca	64	48	.571	0.5	W2
3	Tigres de Quintana Roo	62	48	.564	1.5	W2
4	Rojos del Águila de Veracruz	56	57	.496	9.0	W2
5	Olmecas de Tabasco	54	56	.491	9.5	W1
6	Leones de Yucatán	50	61	.450	14.0	L1
7	Piratas de Campeche	47	63	.427	16.5	L2
8	Petroleros de Minatitlán	37	71	.343	25.5	L2

== Postseason ==
Wild Card games
8	Diablos Rojos del México	1
9	Acereros de Monclova	0
7	Rojos del Águila de Veracruz	1
10	Olmecas de Tabasco	0

First stage
1	Saraperos de Saltillo	3
4	Diablos Rojos del México	0
North
4	Sultanes de Monterrey	3
5	Pericos de Puebla	1
2	Delfines de Ciudad del Carmen	1
4	Rojos del Águila de Veracruz	3
South
3	Guerreros de Oaxaca	0
6	Tigres de Quintana Roo	3

Championship Series
1	Saraperos de Saltillo	0
2	Sultanes de Monterrey	4
4	Rojos del Águila de Veracruz	2
3	Tigres de Quintana Roo	4

Serie del Rey
N2	Sultanes de Monterrey	1
S3	Tigres de Quintana Roo	4

== League leaders ==
Batting leaders
Stat	Player	Team	Total
Batting Average	(Mexico) Luis Mauricio Suárez	Pericos de Puebla	.413
Home Runs	(Dominican Republic) Rubén Mateo	Delfines de Ciudad del Carmen	37
Runs Batted In	(Mexico) Japhet Amador	Diablos Rojos del México	121
Runs	(Dominican Republic) Freddy Guzmán	Delfines de Ciudad del Carmen	99
Hits	(Mexico) Oswaldo Morejón	Vaqueros de la Laguna	181
Stolen Bases	(Dominican Republic) Freddy Guzmán	Delfines de Ciudad del Carmen	73
Slugging Percentage	(Dominican Republic) Luis Terrero	Diablos Rojos del México	.744

Pitching leaders
Stat	Player	Team	Total
Earned run average	(United States) Paul Oseguera	Broncos de Reynosa	3.00
Wins	(Cuba) Amauri Sanit	Tigres de Quintana Roo	12
Wins	(Mexico) Alejandro Soto	Guerreros de Oaxaca	12
Saves	(Venezuela) Víctor Moreno	Acereros de Monclova	33
Innings Pitched	(Mexico) Pablo Ortega	Tigres de Quintana Roo	135.1
Strikeouts	(United States) Paul Oseguera	Broncos de Reynosa	124
WHIP	(Mexico) Mario González	Delfines de Ciudad del Carmen	1.07

== Awards ==
LMB Awards
Award	Player	Team	Ref.
Most Valuable Player	(Dominican Republic) Rubén Mateo	Delfines de Ciudad del Carmen	
Rookie of the Year	(Mexico) Vanny Valenzuela	Delfines de Ciudad del Carmen	
Best Pitcher	(Cuba) Amauri Sanit	Tigres de Quintana Roo	
Best Relief Pitcher	(Dominican Republic) Luis Vizcaíno	Leones de Yucatán	
Manager of the Year	(Dominican Republic) Félix Fermín	Delfines de Ciudad del Carmen	
