= 2014 Mexican Baseball League season =

2014 Mexican League season
- League: Mexican League
- Sport: Baseball
- Duration: April 1 – September 11
- Teams: 16

Serie del Rey
- Champions: Diablos Rojos del México
- Runners-up: Pericos de Puebla
- Finals MVP: Juan Carlos Gamboa

LMB seasons
- ← 2013 2015 →

The 2014 Mexican League season was the 90th season in the history of the Mexican League. It was contested by 16 teams, evenly divided in North and South zones. The season started on 3 April with the match between 2013 season champions Tigres de Quintana Roo and Diablos Rojos del México and ended on 11 September with the last game of the Serie del Rey, where the Diablos Rojos defeated Pericos de Puebla to win the championship.

For this season, Petroleros de Minatitlán was sold and moved to Tijuana to play as Toros de Tijuana.

== Standings ==
North
Rank	Team	W	L	Pct.	GB	STK
1	Diablos Rojos del México	70	42	.625	—	W3
2	Acereros de Monclova	60	51	.541	9.5	W4
3	Sultanes de Monterrey	61	52	.540	9.5	W1
4	Vaqueros de la Laguna	60	51	.541	9.5	W4
5	Saraperos de Saltillo	56	54	.509	13.0	W2
6	Toros de Tijuana	55	58	.487	15.5	L4
7	Rieleros de Aguascalientes	51	61	.455	19.0	L2
8	Broncos de Reynosa	42	70	.375	28.0	L1

South
Rank	Team	W	L	Pct.	GB	STK
1	Tigres de Quintana Roo	65	48	.575	—	L1
2	Pericos de Puebla	61	48	.560	2.0	L4
3	Piratas de Campeche	56	53	.514	7.0	L1
4	Delfines de Ciudad del Carmen	57	54	.514	7.0	W1
5	Guerreros de Oaxaca	55	57	.491	9.5	W3
6	Rojos del Águila de Veracruz	52	60	.464	12.5	L1
7	Leones de Yucatán	46	64	.418	17.5	W1
8	Olmecas de Tabasco	46	65	.414	18.0	W1

== Postseason ==
Wild Card games
8	Vaqueros de la Laguna	1
9	Saraperos de Saltillo	0
7	Delfines de Ciudad del Carmen	1
10	Guerreros de Oaxaca	0

First stage
1	Diablos Rojos del México	4
4	Vaqueros de la Laguna	2
North
4	Acereros de Monclova	0
5	Sultanes de Monterrey	4
2	Tigres de Quintana Roo	4
4	Delfines de Ciudad del Carmen	1
South
3	Pericos de Puebla	4
6	Piratas de Campeche	3

Championship Series
1	Diablos Rojos del México	4
3	Sultanes de Monterrey	0
1	Tigres de Quintana Roo	2
2	Pericos de Puebla	4

Serie del Rey
N1	Diablos Rojos del México	4
S2	Pericos de Puebla	0

== League leaders ==
Batting leaders
Stat	Player	Team	Total
Batting Average	(Dominican Republic) Sandy Madera	Pericos de Puebla	.403
Home Runs	(United States) John Lindsey	Diablos Rojos del México	33
Runs Batted In	(Venezuela) Frank Díaz	Broncos de Reynosa	101
Runs	(Mexico) Agustín Murillo	Sultanes de Monterrey	98
Runs	(United States) Chris Roberson	Sultanes de Monterrey	98
Hits	(Mexico) Luis Borges	Saraperos de Saltillo	173
Stolen Bases	(Dominican Republic) Gilberto Mejía	Delfines de Ciudad del Carmen	49
Slugging Percentage	(Dominican Republic) Sandy Madera	Pericos de Puebla	.696

Pitching leaders
Stat	Player	Team	Total
Earned run average	(Cuba) Amauri Sanit	Tigres de Quintana Roo	3,86
Wins	(Dominican Republic) Fabio Castro	Tigres de Quintana Roo	13
Wins	(Mexico) Salvador Valdez	Vaqueros de la Laguna	13
Saves	(Venezuela) Pedro Rodríguez	Pericos de Puebla	33
Innings Pitched	(Dominican Republic) Lorenzo Barceló	Rieleros de Aguascalientes	152.1
Innings Pitched	(Dominican Republic) José Piña	Rojos del Águila de Veracruz	152.1
Strikeouts	(Cuba) José Contreras	Toros de Tijuana	140
WHIP	(Cuba) Amauri Sanit	Tigres de Quintana Roo	1.07

== Awards ==
LMB Awards
Award	Player	Team	Ref.
Most Valuable Player	(Dominican Republic) Sandy Madera	Pericos de Puebla	
Rookie of the Year	(Mexico) Carlos Figueroa	Diablos Rojos del México	
Best Pitcher	(Cuba) Amauri Sanit	Tigres de Quintana Roo	
Best Relief Pitcher	(Brazil) Tiago da Silva	Delfines de Ciudad del Carmen	
Manager of the Year	(Mexico) Miguel Ojeda	Diablos Rojos del México	
