= 2012 Mexican Baseball League season =

2012 Mexican League season
- League: Mexican League
- Sport: Baseball
- Duration: 16 March – 29 August
- Teams: 16

Serie del Rey
- Champions: Rojos del Águila de Veracruz
- Runners-up: Rieleros de Aguascalientes
- Finals MVP: Lorenzo Barceló

LMB seasons
- ← 2011 2013 →

The 2012 Mexican League season was the 88th season in the history of the Mexican League. It was contested by 16 teams, evenly divided in North and South zones. The season started on 16 March with the match between 2011 season champions Tigres de Quintana Roo and Diablos Rojos del México and ended on 29 August with the last game of the Serie del Rey, where Rojos del Águila de Veracruz defeated Rieleros de Aguascalientes to win the championship, their sixth title.

Two new teams joined the league. Dorados de Chihuahua and Tecolotes de Nuevo Laredo, that did not participate in the 2011 season due to financial problems, moved to Aguascalientes and Ciudad del Carmen respectively. This resulted in the return of Rieleros de Aguascalientes, that last played in the Mexican League in 2007, and the establishment of Delfines de Ciudad del Carmen.

== Standings ==
North
Rank	Team	W	L	Pct.	GB	STK
1	Sultanes de Monterrey	67	45	.598	—	W3
2	Rieleros de Aguascalientes	59	49	.546	6.0	L3
3	Saraperos de Saltillo	59	50	.541	6.5	W3
4	Diablos Rojos del México	61	52	.540	6.5	L1
5	Acereros de Monclova	57	56	.504	10.5	L3
6	Pericos de Puebla	52	57	.477	13.5	W1
7	Vaqueros de la Laguna	48	63	.432	18.5	W4
8	Broncos de Reynosa	44	68	.393	23.0	L4

South
Rank	Team	W	L	Pct.	GB	STK
1	Tigres de Quintana Roo	70	42	.625	—	W1
2	Rojos del Águila de Veracruz	67	44	.604	2.5	W4
3	Olmecas de Tabasco	59	50	.541	9.5	W1
4	Guerreros de Oaxaca	56	52	.519	12.0	L3
5	Piratas de Campeche	51	60	.459	18.5	W3
6	Delfines de Ciudad del Carmen	51	60	.459	18.5	L4
7	Leones de Yucatán	46	66	.411	24.0	L1
8	Petroleros de Minatitlán	40	73	.354	30.5	L1

== Postseason ==
First stage
1	Sultanes de Monterrey	4
8	Diablos Rojos del México	0
North
4	Rieleros de Aguascalientes	4
5	Saraperos de Saltillo	1
2	Tigres de Quintana Roo	4
7	Guerreros de Oaxaca	3
South
3	Rojos del Águila de Veracruz	4
6	Olmecas de Tabasco	1

Championship Series
1	Sultanes de Monterrey	2
2	Rieleros de Aguascalientes	4
1	Tigres de Quintana Roo	2
2	Rojos del Águila de Veracruz	4

Serie del Rey
N2	Rieleros de Aguascalientes	3
S2	Rojos del Águila de Veracruz	4

== League leaders ==
Batting leaders
Stat	Player	Team	Total
AVG	(Cuba) Michel Abreu	Monterrey	.371
HR	(Mexico) Carlos Rodríguez	Aguascalientes	32
RBI	(Cuba) Michel Abreu	Monterrey	106
R	(Mexico) Leo Heras	México	111
H	(Mexico) Carlos Gastélum	Tigres	158
SB	(Dominican Republic) Freddy Guzmán	Cd. del Carmen	56
SLG	(Cuba) Michel Abreu	Monterrey	.678

Pitching leaders
Stat	Player	Team	Total
ERA	(Mexico) Miguel Ruiz	Campeche	2.42
W	(Mexico) Humberto Montemayor	Aguascalientes	14
W	(Mexico) Tomás Solís	Veracruz	14
SV	(Dominican Republic) Jailén Peguero	Veracruz	35
IP	(Venezuela) Ramón Ramírez	Yucatán	135.2
K	(Mexico) Daniel Rodríguez	Saltillo	135
WHIP	(Mexico) Miguel Ruiz	Campeche	1.07

== Awards ==
LMB Awards
Award	Player	Team	Ref.
Most Valuable Player	(Cuba) Michel Abreu	Monterrey	
Rookie of the Year	(Mexico) Adrián Garza	Ciudad del Carmen	
Pitcher of the Year	(Mexico) Tomás Solís	Veracruz	
Reliever of the Year	(Dominican Republic) Jailén Peguero	Veracruz	
Manager of the Year	(Mexico) Enrique Reyes	Aguascalientes	
