= Tiago da Silva =

Brazilian-Italian baseball player (born 1985)

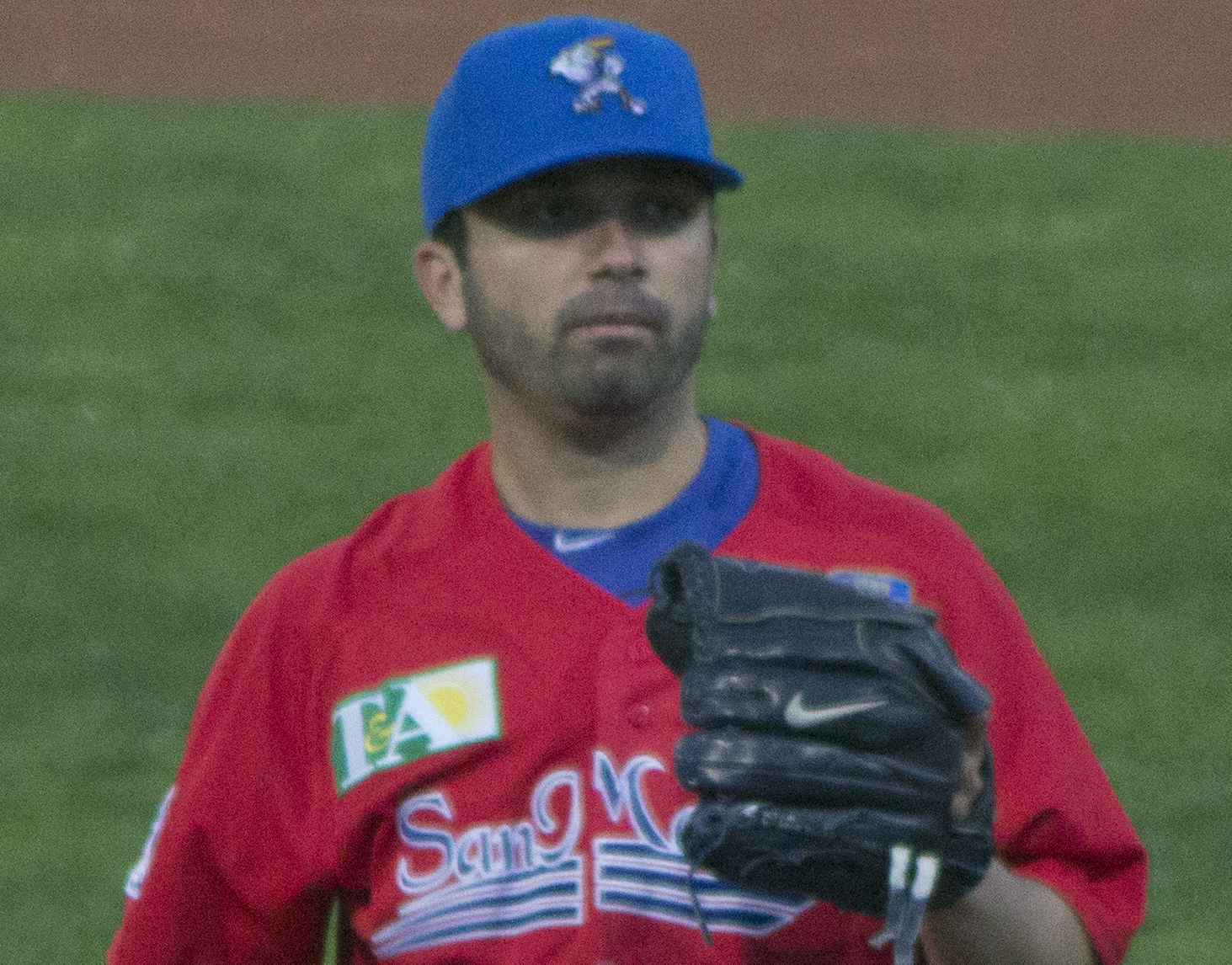

Pericos de Puebla – No. 72
- Pitcher
- Born: March 28, 1985 (age 41); São Paulo, Brazil
- Bats: Right Throws: Right

CPBL debut
- October 3, 2004, for the Macoto Cobras

CPBL statistics (through 2004 season)
- Win–loss record: 0–2
- Earned run average: 23.14
- Strikeouts: 3
- Stats at Baseball Reference

Teams
- Macoto Cobras (2004)
Medals
Men's baseball
Representing Italy
European Baseball Championship
Gold medal – first place	2010 Germany	National team
Bronze medal – third place	2016 Hoofddorp	National team
Bronze medal – third place	2021 Turin	National team

Tiago Felipe Santos da Silva (born March 28, 1985) is a Brazilian-Italian professional baseball pitcher for the Pericos de Puebla of the Mexican League. He has previously played for the Brazil national baseball team and the Italy national baseball team.

== Career ==
=== Macoto Cobras ===
On October 3, 2004, da Silva made his professional debut with the Macoto Cobras of the Chinese Professional Baseball League. He became a free agent following the season.

=== T&A San Marino ===
After not playing affiliated ball since 2004, da Silva joined the T&A San Marino of the Italian Baseball League (IBL) for the 2008 season. From 2008 to 2013, he played remained with the club, posting a 41–12 win–loss record, a 2.00 earned run average, and 490 strikeouts. Following the 2013 season, da Silva became a free agent.

=== Delfines de Ciudad del Carmen ===
On April 1, 2014, da Silva was assigned to the Delfines de Ciudad del Carmen of the Mexican League. He posted a record of 7–4, a 2.07 ERA, and 29 saves. He was released by the team on December 31.

=== Toronto Blue Jays ===
On January 31, 2015, da Silva signed a minor league contract with the Toronto Blue Jays of Major League Baseball (MLB). He opened the season with the High–A Dunedin Blue Jays, and was promoted to the Double–A New Hampshire Fisher Cats on May 2.

=== Delfines de Ciudad del Carmen (second stint) ===
On May 14, 2015, da Silva was loaned to the Delfines de Ciudad del Carmen. Da Silva was released by the Blue Jays organization in November 2015. da Silva played for the Delfines during the 2016 season as well.

=== Rieleros de Aguascalientes ===
On June 24, 2016, da Silva was traded to the Rieleros de Aguascalientes. He finished the 2016 season with the Rieleros.

=== Generales de Durango ===
On October 3, 2016, da Silva was traded to the Delfines de Ciudad del Carmen. The Delfines folded after the 2016 season, relocating to become the Generales de Durango. He made 34 appearances out of the bullpen for Durango in 2017, compiling a 1-1 record and 2.45 ERA with 34 strikeouts and 24 saves across 36 2/3 innings pitched. In 2018, da Silva posted a 13-4 record and 3.97 ERA with 105 strikeouts over 22 starts.

In 2019, da Silva made 41 appearances (12 starts) for the Generales, struggling to a 3-9 record and 6.36 ERA with 72 strikeouts and 10 saves across 93 1/3 innings pitched. He did not play in a game in 2020 due to the cancellation of the Mexican League season because of the COVID-19 pandemic. Returning to action in 2021, da Silva made 20 outings (five starts) for Durango, registering a 3-4 record and 6.29 ERA with 42 strikeouts and two saves over 48 2/3 innings of work.

=== T&A San Marino (second stint) ===
On August 10, 2021, da Silva signed with T&A San Marino of the Italian Baseball League. He made one start for the team in 2022, ceding no runs and earning the win after striking out seven over 4 1/3 innings.

=== Generales de Durango / Caliente de Durango (second stint) ===
In 2023, da Silva returned to the Generales de Durango of the Mexican League, for whom he posted a 3-3 record and 4.50 ERA with 51 strikeouts over 68 innings of work. He pitched in 21 games (14 starts) for the now-Caliente de Durango in 2024, accumulating a 5-5 record and 5.74 ERA with 51 strikeouts across 64 1/3 innings pitched.

In 2025, da Silva made 28 appearances (five starts) for Durango, compiling a 4-2 record and 4.63 ERA with 56 strikeouts across 58 1/3 innings pitched.

=== Guerreros de Oaxaca ===
On July 28, 2025, da Silva was traded to the Guerreros de Oaxaca of the Mexican League. He only made two relief appearances for the team, surrendering no runs and striking out four in three innings pitched.

=== Pericos de Puebla ===
On February 20, 2026, da Silva was traded to the Algodoneros de Unión Laguna of the Mexican League. However, on April 4, da Silva was released by the team. On April 10, da Silva signed with the Pericos de Puebla.

== International career ==
He was selected for Brazil national baseball team at the 2019 Pan American Games Qualifier and 2021 World Baseball Classic Qualifier.

Additionally, da Silva played for the Italy national baseball team at the 2008 European Baseball Cup, 2009 European Baseball Cup, 2009 World Baseball Classic and 2013 World Baseball Classic.

== See also ==
- List of baseball players who have represented more than one nation
