= 2011 Mexican Baseball League season =

2011 Mexican League season
- League: Mexican League
- Sport: Baseball
- Duration: 18 March – 26 August
- Teams: 14

Serie del Rey
- Champions: Tigres de Quintana Roo
- Runners-up: Diablos Rojos del México
- Finals MVP: Iker Franco

LMB seasons
- ← 2010 2012 →

The 2011 Mexican League season was the 87th season in the history of the Mexican League. It was contested by 14 teams, evenly divided in North and South zones. The season started on 18 March with the match between 2010 season champions Saraperos de Saltillo and Acereros de Monclova and ended on 26 August with the last game of the Serie del Rey, where Tigres de Quintana Roo defeated Diablos Rojos del México to win the championship.

For this season, the number of teams was reduced from 16 to 14 after Dorados de Chihuahua and Tecolotes de Nuevo Laredo folded due to financial problems.

== Standings ==
North
Rank	Team	W	L	Pct.	GB	STK
1	Diablos Rojos del México	63	40	.612	—	W4
2	Broncos de Reynosa	57	47	.548	6.5	L1
3	Sultanes de Monterrey	54	49	.524	9.0	L7
4	Pericos de Puebla	53	53	.500	11.5	W2
5	Vaqueros de la Laguna	48	58	.453	16.5	W1
6	Acereros de Monclova	47	59	.443	17.5	W7
7	Saraperos de Saltillo	44	60	.423	19.5	L3

South
Rank	Team	W	L	Pct.	GB	STK
1	Tigres de Quintana Roo	62	43	.590	—	W1
2	Piratas de Campeche	55	45	.550	4.5	W2
3	Rojos del Águila de Veracruz	54	49	.524	7.0	W2
4	Guerreros de Oaxaca	51	51	.500	9.5	L5
5	Olmecas de Tabasco	50	55	.476	12.0	W2
6	Petroleros de Minatitlán	47	57	.452	14.5	W2
7	Leones de Yucatán	43	62	.410	19.0	L2

== Postseason ==
First stage
1	Diablos Rojos del México	4
8	Pericos de Puebla	2
North
4	Broncos de Reynosa	2
5	Sultanes de Monterrey	4
2	Tigres de Quintana Roo	4
7	Guerreros de Oaxaca	2
South
3	Piratas de Campeche	3
6	Rojos del Águila de Veracruz	4

Championship Series
1	Diablos Rojos del México	4
3	Sultanes de Monterrey	3
1	Tigres de Quintana Roo	4
2	Rojos del Águila de Veracruz	2

Serie del Rey
N1	Diablos Rojos del México	0
S1	Tigres de Quintana Roo	4

== League leaders ==
Batting leaders
Stat	Player	Team	Total
AVG	(Cuba) Bárbaro Cañizares	Oaxaca	.396
HR	(Mexico) Jorge Guzmán	Veracruz	39
RBI	(Dominican Republic) Luis Terrero	México	110
R	(Dominican Republic) Luis Terrero	México	109
H	(Mexico) Leo Heras	México	152
SB	(Mexico) Eduardo Arredondo	Reynosa	32
SB	(Dominican Republic) Henry Mateo	Tabasco	32
SLG	(Dominican Republic) Luis Terrero	México	.770

Pitching leaders
Stat	Player	Team	Total
ERA	(Mexico) Marco Tovar	Reynosa	3.11
W	(Mexico) Marco Tovar	Reynosa	12
W	(Mexico) Francisco Campos	Campeche	12
W	(Mexico) Leonardo González	Tabasco	12
W	(Mexico) Marco Duarte	México	12
SV	(Dominican Republic) Sandy Nin	Tigres	24
IP	(Dominican Republic) Lorenzo Barceló	Puebla	142.1
K	(Mexico) Daniel Rodríguez	Saltillo	118
WHIP	(Mexico) Miguel Ruiz	Campeche	1.16

== Awards ==
Award	Player	Team	Ref.
Most Valuable Player	(Dominican Republic) Luis Terrero	México	
Rookie of the Year	(Mexico) Alejandro Martínez	Minatitlán	
Best Pitcher	(Mexico) Marco Tovar	Reynosa	
Best Relief Pitcher	(Dominican Republic) Sandy Nin	Tigres	
Manager of the Year	(Mexico) Matías Carrillo	Tigres	
