= Elniery García =

Dominican baseball player (born 1994)

Rieleros de Aguascalientes – No. 71
- Pitcher
- Born: December 24, 1994 (age 31); Cotuí, Dominican Republic
- Bats: Left Throws: Left

CPBL debut
- September 5, 2023, for the Fubon Guardians

CPBL statistics (through 2023 season)
- Win–loss record: 3–3
- Earned run average: 3.95
- Strikeouts: 28
- Stats at Baseball Reference

Teams
- Fubon Guardians (2023)

Elniery De Jesus García (born December 24, 1994) is a Dominican professional baseball pitcher for the Rieleros de Aguascalientes of the Mexican League. He has previously played in Chinese Professional Baseball League (CPBL) for the Fubon Guardians.

== Career ==
=== Philadelphia Phillies ===
On May 31, 2012, García signed with the Philadelphia Phillies as an international free agent. He made his professional debut with the Dominican Summer League Phillies. García spent the 2013 season with the rookie-level Gulf Coast League Phillies, where he posted a 1–3 record and 5.15 ERA with 31 strikeouts in 36 2/3 innings pitched across nine starts.

García split the 2014 campaign between the GCL Phillies and Low-A Williamsport Crosscutters. In 11 appearances (four starts) for the two affiliates, he compiled a cumulative 2–2 record and 2.64 ERA with 28 strikeouts across 30 2/3 innings pitched. In 2015, García made 21 starts for the Single-A Lakewood BlueClaws, logging an 8–9 record and 3.23 ERA with 66 strikeouts over 120 innings of work.

García spent the 2016 season with the Single-A Clearwater Threshers, posting a 12–4 record and 2.68 ERA with 91 strikeouts in 117 2/3 innings pitched across 20 appearances (19 starts). On November 18, 2016, the Phillies added García to their 40-man roster to protect him from the Rule 5 draft.

On April 14, 2017, García was suspended 80 games by Major League Baseball after testing positive for Boldenone, a banned performance-enhancing substance. On the season, he made seven starts split between the rookie-level GCL Phillies and Double-A Reading Fightin Phils, accumulating a combined 2–1 record and 1.47 ERA with 13 strikeouts across 30 2/3 innings pitched. On November 20, García was removed from the 40-man roster and sent outright to the Triple-A Lehigh Valley IronPigs.

García made 10 appearances (9 starts) for Double-A Reading in 2018, but struggled to an 0–6 record and 6.38 ERA with 29 strikeouts across 42 1/3 innings pitched.

=== St. Louis Cardinals ===
On July 5, 2018, García was traded to the St. Louis Cardinals in exchange for international bonus pool space. He spent the remainder of the year with the Double-A Springfield Cardinals, also making one appearance for the Triple-A Memphis Redbirds. In 13 appearances for Springfield, García compiled a 1–1 record and 4.26 ERA with 14 strikeouts over 19 innings of work. He elected free agency following the season on November 2.

On April 22, 2019, García signed a minor league contract with the Seattle Mariners. However, he did not make an appearance for the organization, and elected free agency following the season on November 4.

=== Generales de Durango ===
On February 10, 2022, García signed with the Sultanes de Monterrey of the Mexican League. However, he ultimately never appeared in a game for Monterrey. On December 2, García signed with the Generales de Durango. He made 13 appearances (12 starts) for Durango in 2023, registering a 6–3 record and 3.72 ERA with 58 strikeouts across 67 2/3 innings pitched.

=== Fubon Guardians ===
On August 16, 2023, García signed with the Fubon Guardians of the Chinese Professional Baseball League. In seven starts for Fubon, he posted a 3–3 record and 3.95 ERA with 28 strikeouts over 41 innings pitched.

On March 26, 2024, it was reported that García had signed with the CTBC Brothers. However, on April 17, García was permanently banned from the CPBL due to a failed drug test.

=== Rieleros de Aguascalientes ===
On December 4, 2024, García signed with the Rieleros de Aguascalientes of the Mexican League. In 15 starts he threw 72.1 innings going 2–6 with a 5.47 ERA with 55 strikeouts.
