= 2010 Mexican Baseball League season =

2010 Mexican League season
- League: Mexican League
- Sport: Baseball
- Duration: March 16 – August 16
- Teams: 16

Serie del Rey
- Champions: Saraperos de Saltillo
- Runners-up: Pericos de Puebla
- Finals MVP: Daniel Rodríguez

LMB seasons
- ← 2009 2011 →

The 2010 Mexican League season was the 86th season in the history of the Mexican League. It was contested by 16 teams, evenly divided in North and South zones. The season started on 16 March with the match between 2009 season champions Saraperos de Saltillo and Acereros de Monclova and ended on 26 August with the last game of the Serie del Rey, where the Saraperos defeated Pericos de Puebla to win their second championship in a row.

The Mexican League joined the celebration of the Bicentennial of the Mexican War of Independence and the Centennial of the Mexican Revolution. Both zones were renamed: the North zone to Francisco I. Madero and the South zone to Miguel Hidalgo; the championship series, Serie del Rey, was also renamed to Serie del Bicentenario (Bicentennial Series).

== Standings ==
Francisco I. Madero
Rank	Team	W	L	Pct.	GB	STK
1	Diablos Rojos del México	64	40	.615	—	W2
2	Dorados de Chihuahua	59	48	.551	6.5	W1
3	Sultanes de Monterrey	58	48	.547	7.0	W1
4	Saraperos de Saltillo	55	49	.529	9.0	L2
5	Broncos de Reynosa	56	51	.523	9.5	L1
6	Acereros de Monclova	53	52	.505	11.5	W2
7	Vaqueros de la Laguna	45	62	.421	20.5	L1
8	Tecolotes de Nuevo Laredo	32	72	.308	32.0	L2

Miguel Hidalgo
Rank	Team	W	L	Pct.	GB	STK
1	Pericos de Puebla	66	39	.629	—	L1
2	Guerreros de Oaxaca	60	45	.571	6.0	W1
3	Tigres de Quintana Roo	56	47	.544	9.0	L1
4	Leones de Yucatán	54	50	.519	11.5	L2
5	Piratas de Campeche	52	50	.510	12.5	W1
6	Olmecas de Tabasco	46	60	.434	20.5	L1
7	Petroleros de Minatitlán	44	60	.423	21.5	W4
8	Rojos del Águila de Veracruz	39	66	.371	27.0	W1

== Postseason ==
First stage
1	Diablos Rojos del México	3
8	Saraperos de Saltillo	4
Francisco I. Madero
4	Dorados de Chihuahua	1
5	Sultanes de Monterrey	4
2	Pericos de Puebla	4
7	Leones de Yucatán	2
Miguel Hidalgo
3	Guerreros de Oaxaca	4
6	Tigres de Quintana Roo	3

Championship Series
4	Saraperos de Saltillo	4
3	Sultanes de Monterrey	2
1	Pericos de Puebla	4
2	Guerreros de Oaxaca	2

Serie del Bicentenario
N4	Saraperos de Saltillo	4
S1	Pericos de Puebla	1

== League leaders ==
Batting leaders
Stat	Player	Team	Total
Batting Average	(Dominican Republic) Willis Otáñez	Pericos de Puebla	.393
Home Runs	(Dominican Republic) Víctor Díaz	Rojos del Águila de Veracruz	29
Runs Batted In	(Dominican Republic) Víctor Díaz	Rojos del Águila de Veracruz	96
Runs	(Mexico) Óscar Robles	Diablos Rojos del México	95
Hits	(Dominican Republic) Sandy Madera	Leones de Yucatán	146
Stolen Bases	(Dominican Republic) Alexis Gómez	Vaqueros de la Laguna	37
Slugging Percentage	(Dominican Republic) Sandy Madera	Leones de Yucatán	.630

Pitching leaders
Stat	Player	Team	Total
Earned run average	(Japan) Mac Suzuki	Dorados de Chihuahua	2.89
Wins	(United States) Bobby Cramer	Tigres de Quintana Roo	13
Saves	(Venezuela) Luis Ramírez	Pericos de Puebla	30
Innings Pitched	(Dominican Republic) Lorenzo Barceló	Pericos de Puebla	135.3
Strikeouts	(United States) Bobby Cramer	Tigres de Quintana Roo	123
WHIP	(United States) Bobby Cramer	Tigres de Quintana Roo	1.12

== Awards ==
LMB Awards
Award	Player	Team	Ref.
Most Valuable Player	(Dominican Republic) Willis Otáñez	Pericos de Puebla	
Rookie of the Year	(Mexico) Héctor Velázquez	Piratas de Campeche	
Best Pitcher	(United States) Bobby Cramer	Tigres de Quintana Roo	
Best Relief Pitcher	(Venezuela) Luis Ramírez	Pericos de Puebla	
Manager of the Year	(Mexico) Alfonso Jiménez	Pericos de Puebla	
