= List of baseball players who have represented more than one nation =

This is a list of baseball players who have represented more than one nation in international competition. With the introduction of the World Baseball Classic in 2006 and its lax eligibility rules, it became increasingly common for players to play for different national baseball teams during their careers. Membership in this list is also inflated by the status of Curaçao as a constituent country of the Kingdom of the Netherlands which also fields its own national baseball team which plays in certain regional tournaments including the Caribbean Baseball Cup and the Central American and Caribbean Games.

== List of players ==
| Player | First national team | Subsequent national team(s) | Ref. |
|---|---|---|---|
| Logan T. Allen | United States (College) | Panama | |
| Dan Altavilla | United States | Italy | |
| Nelmerson Angela | Netherlands | Curaçao | |
| Sherten Apostel | Netherlands | Curaçao | |
| Nolan Arenado | United States | Puerto Rico | |
| Rogelio Armenteros | Cuba (U-15) | Spain | |
| Randy Arozarena | Cuba (U-18) | Mexico | |
| Jeremy Bleich | United States (U-18) | Israel | |
| Enrique Bradfield | United States (College) | Panama | |
| Jac Caglianone | United States (College) | Italy | |
| Bárbaro Cañizares | Cuba | Spain | |
| Giovanni Carrara | Venezuela | Italy | |
| Mike Cervenak | United States | Czech Republic | |
| Bruce Chen | Panama | China | |
| Matt Clark | United States | Mexico | |
| Ivanon Coffie | Netherlands | Netherlands Antilles | |
| Jesse Crain | United States | Canada | |
| José Cruz Jr. | United States (College) | Puerto Rico | |
| Tiago da Silva | Brazil | Italy | |
| Johnny Damon | United States | Thailand | |
| Matt Davidson | United States (U-16) | Canada | |
| Ike Davis | United States | Israel | |
| Quintin de Cuba | Netherlands Antilles | Netherlands | |
| Quintin de Cuba | Netherlands Antilles | Curaçao | |
| Quintin de Cuba | Netherlands Antilles | Sint Maarten | |
| Alex Dickerson | United States (College) | Israel | |
| Lenny DiNardo | United States (College) | Italy | |
| Jeter Downs | Colombia | Nicaragua | |
| Yadir Drake | Mexico | Cuba | |
| Jarren Duran | United States | Mexico | |
| Geno Espineli | United States | Philippines | |
| Danny Espinosa | United States (College, U-16) | Mexico | |
| Chavez Fernander | Great Britain | Bahamas | |
| Dominic Fletcher | United States (College) | Italy | |
| Brian Flynn | United States | Germany | |
| Freddie Freeman | United States (U-18, U-15) | Canada | |
| Sam Fuld | United States (College) | Israel | |
| Yasser Gómez | Cuba | Spain | |
| Shawn Green | United States (U-18) | Israel | |
| Matt Harvey | United States (U-18) | Italy | |
| C. J. Hinojosa | United States (College, U-16, U-14) | Mexico | |
| Druw Jones | United States (U-18) | Netherlands | |
| Ian Kinsler | United States | Israel | |
| George Kottaras | Greece | Canada | |
| Brandon Laird | United States (U-16) | Mexico | |
| Elián Leyva | Spain | Cuba | |
| Francisco Lindor | United States (U-18, U-16) | Puerto Rico | |
| Christian Lopes | United States (U-18, U-16) | Brazil | |
| Tim Lopes | United States (U-16) | Brazil | |
| Jack López | Puerto Rico | United States | |
| Otto Lopez | Dominican Republic | Canada | |
| Michael Lorenzen | United States (College, U-18, U-16) | Italy | |
| Manny Machado | United States (U-18) | Dominican Republic | |
| Drew Maggi | United States (College) | Italy | |
| Ruderly Manuel | Netherlands | Curaçao | |
| Yusuke Masago | Japan (U-23) | China | |
| Nick Maronde | United States (U-18) | New Zealand | |
| Ronald Medrano | Spain | Nicaragua | |
| MJ Melendez | United States (U-18) | Puerto Rico | |
| Yoanner Negrín | Spain | Mexico | |
| Mike Nickeas | United States (College) | Great Britain | |
| Augie Ojeda | United States | Mexico | |
| Adam Ottavino | Italy | United States | |
| Andre Pallante | United States (College) | Italy | |
| Horacio Ramírez | United States | Mexico | |
| Cesar Ramos | United States (College) | Mexico | |
| J. C. Romero | United States | Puerto Rico | |
| Ramón Rosso | Dominican Republic | Spain | |
| Andrelton Simmons | Netherlands | Curaçao | |
| Sean Spencer | United States (College, U-18) | Greece | |
| Robert Stock | United States (U-16) | Israel | |
| Marcus Stroman | United States | Puerto Rico | |
| Jameson Taillon | United States (U-18) | Canada | |
| Kyle Teel | United States (College) | Italy | |
| Alek Thomas | United States (U-18) | Mexico | |
| Tahnaj Thomas | Great Britain | Bahamas | |
| Jake Thompson | United States | Mexico | |
| Mike Tonis | United States (College) | Greece | |
| Raúl Valdés | Cuba | Dominican Republic | |
| Wuillians Vasquez | Venezuela | Nicaragua | |
| Stijn van der Meer | Netherlands | Curaçao | |
| Franklin van Gurp | Netherlands | Curaçao | |
| Alex Verdugo | United States (U-14) | Mexico | |
| Mark Vientos | United States (U-15) | Nicaragua | |
| Chavez Young | Great Britain | Bahamas | |
| Josh Zeid | United States (U-16) | Israel | |

== See also ==
- List of association football players capped by two senior national teams
- List of eligibility transfers in athletics
- List of FIDE federation player transfers
- List of cricketers who have played for two international teams
- List of field hockey players who competed for more than one nation
- Nationality changes in gymnastics
- List of rugby union players who have represented more than one nation
