= Joe Alvarez =

Cuban baseball manager (born 1956)

- Manager
- Born: June 11, 1956 (age 70); Manzanillo, Cuba

Career highlights and awards
- Gulf Coast League championship (1986, 1987); Florida State League championship (1990); Mexican League South Division pennant (2014)

José René Álvarez Ramírez (born June 11, 1956), known as Joe Alvarez, is a Cuban American baseball manager and a former utility infielder in Minor League Baseball. Listed at 5 ft 9 in (1.75 m), 159 lb (72 kg), Alvarez batted and threw right handed.

Alvarez spent four seasons in the minors playing mostly at shortstop for the New York Yankees, Houston Astros, and Baltimore Orioles organizations. He worked his way up to Class Double A in 1977, but did not play a game again after suffering an injury.

== Playing career ==
Born José René Álvarez Ramírez in Manzanillo, Cuba, he grew up in Elizabeth, New Jersey, where he attended St. Patrick High School. The Yankees selected 19-year-old Alvarez in the third round of the 1974 MLB draft out of school and sent him immediately to their rookie class Johnson City Yankees in the Appalachian League.

Alvarez opened 1975 with Class A- Oneonta Yankees, but was acquired by Houston during an off season transaction with the Yankees. Afterwards, he reported to Class A Dubuque Packers in 1976, and gained a promotion to Double A Columbus Astros late in the year. He then found himself on the move again, this time to the Orioles organization in 1977, playing with Class A Miami Orioles and for AA Charlotte Orioles. In a four-season career, Alvarez posted an average of .194 with two home runs and 94 RBI in 322 games.

== Managing career ==
Looking toward the future of his baseball career, Alvarez developed the ability to scout and develop young talent. As a result, he spent two years as a coach in the Orioles minor league system before joining the Los Angeles Dodgers organization and becoming a manager. In seven seasons from 1984 through 1990, his teams posted winning records in six of these seasons, including championships with the Gulf Coast Dodgers in 1986 and 1987 and the Vero Beach Dodgers in 1990.

After that, Alvarez was the base running and hitting instructor for the Lakewood BlueClaws, the Philadelphia Phillies' Single-A team, in 2006. Under Alvarez helm, the Blueclaws led the Phillies organization in stolen bases (177). Prior to coaching with the BlueClaws he was the hitting coach for the Phillies' Short-Season A Batavia Muckdogs.

In 2008, Alvarez was named manager of the Hudson Valley Renegades, a New York–Penn League affiliate of the Tampa Bay Rays. He later managed the Gulf Coast Rays from 2009 through 2011, guiding the team to a second place finish in the 2010 season.

In between, Alvarez managed the Rojos del Aguila de Veracruz of the winter Mexican Pacific League in 2007 and coached in the same league for the Yaquis de Obregón in 2008. He then received his first opportunity to coach in the summer Mexican League in 2014 with the Pericos de Puebla, serving as an interim manager for the club as a replacement for departed Houston Jiménez. He then guided the Pericos to the South Division pennant. Afterwards, they beat Campeche in the first round of the playoffs and then upset their rivals, the Tigres de Quintana Roo, advancing to the Championship Series and being defeated by the Diablos Rojos del México in a four-game sweep.

Alvarez was slated to return to Puebla in 2016, but he declined the offer for the purpose of coach as an instructor for the SK Wyverns of the KBO League. In an interview, Alvarez explained that he had a previously established commitment to the Korean team. In 2017, he came back to the Mexican League to manage the Generales de Durango club. In 2018, he managed the Guerreros de Oaxaca for a portion of the Mexican League season, and in the winter also had a stint as manager of the Venados de Mazatlán of the Mexican Pacific League. In 2019, he was named manager for the Rieleros de Aguascalientes of the Mexican League, but was fired after leading the team to a 17-22 start to the season.
