= Rubén Mateo =

Dominican baseball player (born 1978)

Ruben Mateo
- Outfielder
- Born: February 10, 1978 (age 48); San Cristobal, Dominican Republic
- Batted: Right Threw: Right

MLB debut
- June 12, 1999, for the Texas Rangers

Last MLB appearance
- August 21, 2004, for the Kansas City Royals

MLB statistics
- Batting average: .250
- Home runs: 21
- Runs batted in: 89
- Stats at Baseball Reference

Teams
- Texas Rangers (1999–2001); Cincinnati Reds (2002–2003); Pittsburgh Pirates (2004); Kansas City Royals (2004); LG Twins (2005)

Ruben Amaurys Mateo (born February 10, 1978) is a Dominican former professional baseball outfielder. He has played six seasons in Major League Baseball, playing for the Texas Rangers, Cincinnati Reds, Pittsburgh Pirates, and Kansas City Royals. He also played in the Korea Baseball Organization for the LG Twins.

== Career ==
He was signed as an undrafted free agent by the Rangers in 1994. Mateo played his first professional season, in American baseball, with their Single-A Charleston RiverDogs in 1996. In 2007, he played for the Milwaukee Brewers' Double-A club, the Huntsville Stars and the Newark Bears of the independent Atlantic League, where he played in the championship series. Mateo returned to Newark Bears of the Atlantic League for the 2008 season. In 2009, he played in the Mexican League for the Broncos de Reynosa, his most recent professional season.

He was once regarded as the top prospect in the Texas Rangers system and was frequently rumored to be involved in many high-profile trades. On June 2, 2000, Ruben Mateo broke his leg trying to beat out a ground ball to first base. At the time, he was leading all rookies in batting average. He went on to miss the remainder of the season.

Mateo won the most valuable player award during the 2013 Mexican League season while playing for Delfines del Carmen. He batted .322, leading the league in home runs (37) and finishing second in RBI (119).
