= Matt Clark (baseball) =

American baseball player (born 1986)

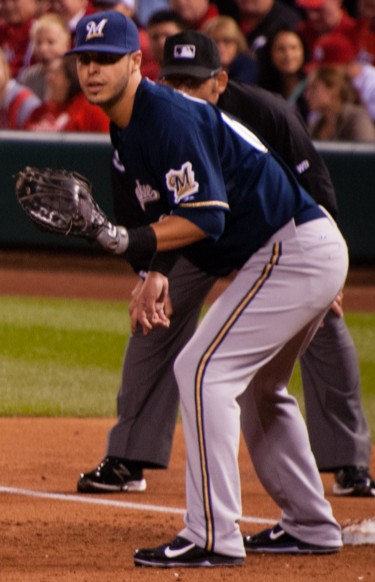
- Clark with the Milwaukee Brewers
- First baseman / Outfielder
- Born: December 10, 1986 (age 39); West Covina, California, U.S.
- Batted: Left Threw: Right

Professional debut
- NPB: 2013, for the Chunichi Dragons
- MLB: September 2, 2014, for the Milwaukee Brewers

Last MLB appearance
- September 28, 2014, for the Milwaukee Brewers

MLB statistics (through 2015 season)
- Batting average: .185
- Home runs: 3
- Runs batted in: 7

NPB statistics (through 2016 season)
- Batting average: .234
- Home runs: 27
- Runs batted in: 74
- Stats at Baseball Reference

Teams
- Chunichi Dragons (2013); Milwaukee Brewers (2014); Orix Buffaloes (2016)
Medals
Men's baseball
Representing United States
Pan American Games
Silver medal – second place	2011 Guadalajara	National team
Representing Mexico
2019 WBSC Premier12
Bronze medal – third place	2019 Tokyo	National team

Matthew Terry Clark (born December 10, 1986) is an American former professional baseball first baseman and outfielder. He played for the Milwaukee Brewers of Major League Baseball (MLB) and the Chunichi Dragons and Orix Buffaloes (NPB). Before beginning his professional career, he played college baseball at UC Santa Barbara and Louisiana State University. Clark also competed for the United States national baseball team and the Mexico national baseball team.

== Early life and education ==
Clark attended Etiwanda High School in Rancho Cucamonga, California. It was announced on November 18, 2004, that Clark had signed with the UC Santa Barbara Gauchos baseball team and enrolled at the University of California, Santa Barbara. Clark played in 44 games as a true freshman and hit 2 home runs for the Gauchos. He left Santa Barbara after his freshman year and continued his collegiate career at Riverside Community College, where he was named a Junior college First-Team All-American in 2007. Clark was drafted by the Pittsburgh Pirates in the 28th round (848th overall) of the 2007 Major League Baseball (MLB) Draft, but did not sign. After the 2007 season, he played collegiate summer baseball with the Cotuit Kettleers of the Cape Cod Baseball League.

Clark transferred to Louisiana State University (LSU), where he played for the LSU Tigers baseball team in the Southeastern Conference of the National Collegiate Athletic Association's (NCAA) Division I in 2008. As a junior, his 28 home runs tied Gordon Beckham for most in NCAA's Division I.

== Career ==
=== San Diego Padres ===
The San Diego Padres selected Clark in the 12th round (375th overall) of the 2008 MLB draft, and Clark signed with the Padres. He began his professional career with the Eugene Emeralds of the Low-A Northwest League in 2008, batting .279/.384/.443 in 140 at-bats.

In 2009, Clark played for the Fort Wayne TinCaps of the Single-A Midwest League and the Lake Elsinore Storm of the High-A California League. He finished the 2009 season batting .279/.360/.504 with 101 runs batted in (RBI) and 134 strikeouts in 502 at-bats at Fort Wayne and Lake Elsinore, one of 15 minor league baseball players to have at least 100 RBI that season.

Clark played for the San Antonio Missions of the Double-A Texas League in 2010 (batting .269/.339/.485 with 28 home runs (2nd in the Texas League) and 97 RBI (2nd) in 499 at-bats while leading the league with 146 strikeouts). He then played for the Tucson Padres of the Triple-A Pacific Coast League in 2011 (batting .292/.363/.498 with 23 home runs and 83 RBI and 116 strikeouts in 462 at-bats).

The Padres invited Clark to spring training in 2012. In 2012 with Tucson, he batted .290/.367/.506 with 22 home runs (6th in the league) and 77 RBI (10th) as he struck out 113 times (3rd) in 445 at-bats. He was released from the organization on January 8, 2013.

=== Chunichi Dragons ===
Clark played with the Chunichi Dragons of Nippon Professional Baseball (NPB) for the 2013 season. He batted .238/.328/.457 with 25 home runs (4th in the league) and 70 RBIs (7th) as he struck out 130 times (leading the league) in 407 at bats.

=== New York Mets ===
On January 31, 2014, Clark signed a minor-league contract with the New York Mets that included an invitation to spring training. He appeared in 67 games for the Double-A Binghamton Mets, batting .297/.380/.498 with 10 home runs and 46 RBI in 219 at-bats, before he was released on June 25.

=== Milwaukee Brewers ===
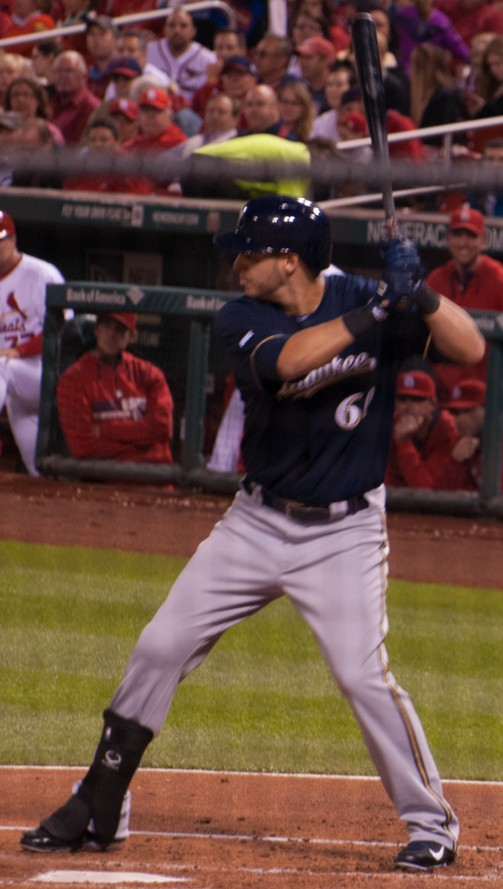
Clark batting for the Milwaukee Brewers in 2014

On July 4, 2014, Clark signed a minor-league contract with the Milwaukee Brewers. Playing for the Triple–A Nashville Sounds, he batted .313/.371/.605 with 16 home runs and 37 RBI in 195 at–bats. Clark was called up to the Brewers' MLB roster in September. He collected his first career RBI, then later hit his first MLB home run on September 10, at home against the Miami Marlins. The home run extended the Brewers' lead over the Marlins to 3–1 in the bottom of the 7th inning in a game with potential playoff implications. In 27 at–bats with the Brewers he hit .185/.226/.519.

Clark spent the 2015 season with the Triple-A Colorado Springs Sky Sox, batting .291/.367/.492 with 34 doubles (8th in the Pacific Coast League), 20 home runs, and 77 RBI in 478 at bats. On November 2, 2015, Clark was removed from the 40–man roster and sent outright to Triple–A. He elected free agency following the season on November 6.

=== Vaqueros Laguna ===
On February 26, 2016, Clark signed a minor league contract with the Chicago Cubs that included an invitation to spring training. He was released prior to the start of the season on March 26. Clark signed with the Vaqueros Laguna of the Mexican League on April 28. After 15 at-bats, he was released on May 3.

=== Orix Buffaloes ===
Clark returned to NPB with the Orix Buffaloes on May 12, 2016. After 29 at-bats, he became a free agent at the conclusion of the 2016 season.

=== Mexican League (2017–2021) ===
On February 28, 2017, Clark signed with the Acereros de Monclova of the Mexican League. On April 14, 2018, Clark was traded to the Pericos de Puebla of the Mexican League. Clark was later traded to the Tecolotes de los Dos Laredos on June 11. On August 15, Clark was loaned to the Leones de Yucatán for the remainder of the 2018 season. Between three teams in the Mexican League, in 2018 he batted .278/.382/.474 with 12 home runs and 47 RBI in 266 at-bats.

After electing free agency following the season, Clark signed with the Bravos de León on March 5, 2019. In 2019 with the team, he batted .316/.404/.681 (5th in the Mexican League) with 27 home runs and 87 RBI in 285 at-bats. Clark did not play in a game in 2020 due to the cancellation of the Mexican League season because of the COVID-19 pandemic.

On February 2, 2021, Clark was traded to the Sultanes de Monterrey along with Norman Elenes and Omar Renteria in exchange for Chris Roberson and Felix Perez. In 15 games with the team, he batted .220/.375/.240 with 11 hits and 3 RBI in 64 at-bats.

On June 14, 2021, Clark was traded back to the Bravos de León in exchange for IF Carlos Álvarez. He finished the season with a .299/.388/.576 line, belting 13 home runs and driving in 43 runs over 45 games.

On March 25, 2022, Clark announced his retirement from professional baseball.

== International career ==
Clark played for the United States national baseball team in the 2011 Baseball World Cup and the 2011 Pan American Games, winning the silver medal.

In 2019, he was on the Mexico national baseball team in the 2019 WBSC Premier 12, when he hit a home run in a game against the United States bringing home the bronze medal, 3–2. It qualified him for consideration for a national team spot in the 2020 Olympic Games but he was not selected.

== Personal life ==
Clark's father, Terry Clark, played in MLB. Clark is married to Julia Morales. He is of Mexican descent through his maternal grandmother.

== See also ==
- List of baseball players who have represented more than one nation
- List of second-generation Major League Baseball players
