= Drew Maggi =

American baseball player (born 1989)

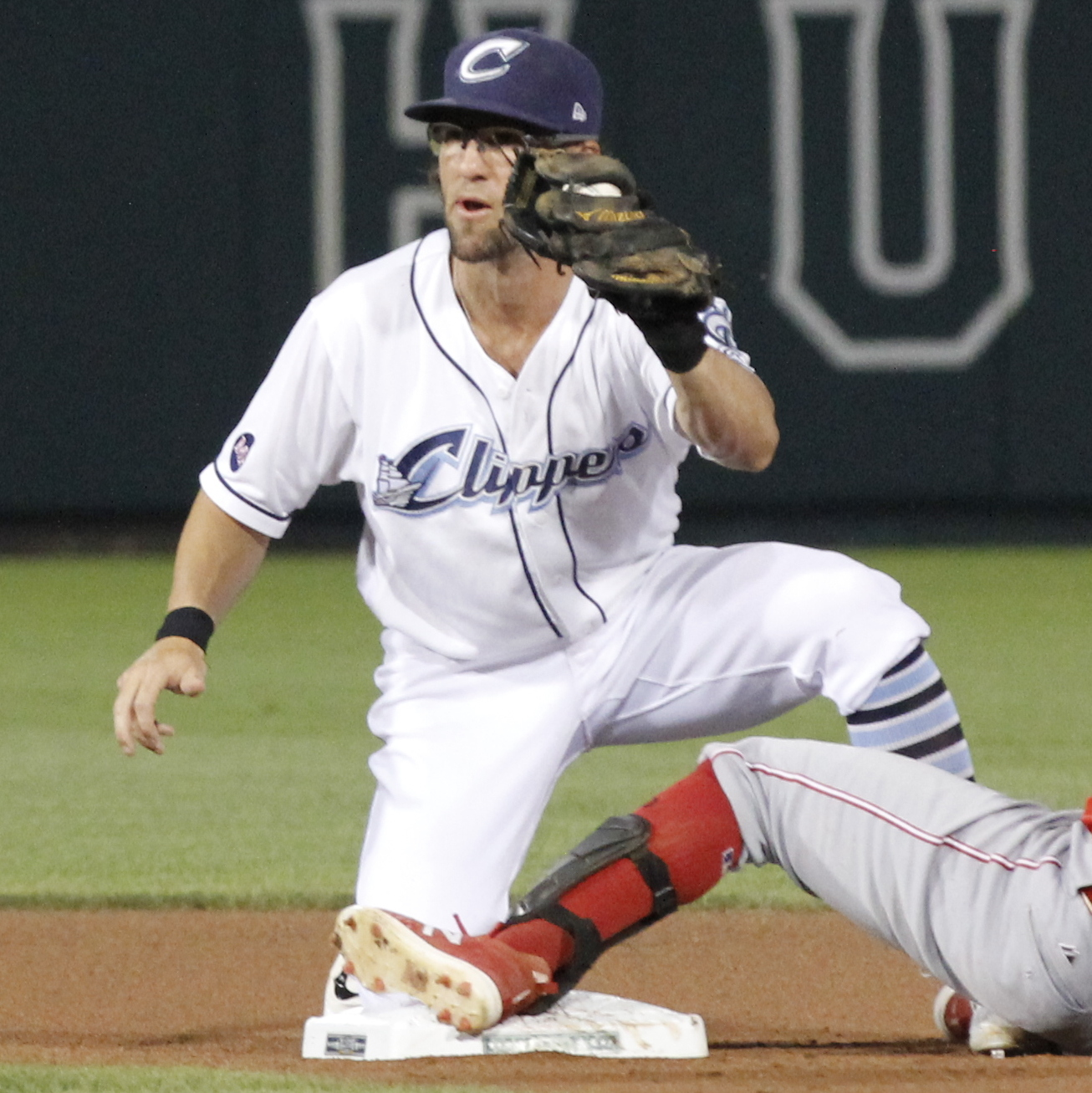
- Maggi with the Columbus Clippers in 2018

Staten Island FerryHawks – No. 8
- Infielder
- Born: May 16, 1989 (age 37); Phoenix, Arizona, U.S.
- Bats: Right Throws: Right

MLB debut
- April 26, 2023, for the Pittsburgh Pirates

MLB statistics (through 2023 season)
- Batting average: .333
- Home runs: 0
- Runs batted in: 1
- Stats at Baseball Reference

Teams
- Pittsburgh Pirates (2023)

Andrew Jerome Maggi (born May 16, 1989) is an American professional baseball infielder for the Staten Island FerryHawks of the Atlantic League of Professional Baseball. Maggi is of Italian descent and played for the Italy national baseball team in the 2017 World Baseball Classic. He has previously played in Major League Baseball (MLB) for the Pittsburgh Pirates. Maggi gained significant attention from both the media and fans in 2023, when after 13 years of playing in the minors, he made his major league debut.

== Career ==
=== Amateur career ===
Maggi attended Brophy College Preparatory in Phoenix, Arizona. The Arizona Diamondbacks selected him in the 47th round of the 2008 MLB draft, but he did not sign. Maggi enrolled at Arizona State University and played college baseball for the Arizona State Sun Devils. He was named All-Pac-12 shortstop his sophomore year and was a quarterfinalist for the Brooks Wallace award, given to the nation's best shortstop.

=== Pittsburgh Pirates ===
The Pittsburgh Pirates selected Maggi in the 15th round of the 2010 MLB draft, and he signed for a $465,000 bonus.

Maggi was named to the 2010 USA Baseball Collegiate National Team where he hit the game-tying home run in the gold-medal game and was named tournament defensive MVP of the championship against Cuba.

Maggi played in the Pirates organization from 2010 through 2014. He was a three-time mid-season all star, including with the Eastern League in 2014.

=== Los Angeles Angels ===
Maggi signed with the Los Angeles Angels of Anaheim as a minor-league free agent in 2015. Maggi was named a Texas League mid-season all star in the 2015 season for the Double-A Arkansas Travelers, where he had a .242 batting average in 125 games.

=== Los Angeles Dodgers ===
On January 24, 2016, Maggi signed a minor league contract with the Los Angeles Dodgers. He split the season between the Double–A Tulsa Drillers and the Triple–A Oklahoma City Dodgers, and hit .289 in 110 combined games. Maggi was also a midseason All-Star in the Texas League in 2016. He elected free agency following the season on November 7.

On January 17, 2017, Maggi re–signed with the Dodgers organization on a new minor league contract. In 2017 with Oklahoma City, he played in 84 games and hit .271/.367/.392 with 5 home runs, 29 RBI, and 7 stolen bases. He elected free agency following the season on November 6.

=== Cleveland Indians ===
On November 22, 2017, Maggi was signed by the Cleveland Indians to a minor league contract that included an invitation to the club's 2018 spring training camp. On April 4, 2018, Maggi was suspended 50 games after testing positive for amphetamine. Following his activation, he played in 64 games for the Triple–A Columbus Clippers, for whom he hit .272/.333/.345 with one home run, 14 RBI, and 11 stolen bases. Maggi elected free agency following the season on November 2.

=== Minnesota Twins ===
On January 16, 2019, Maggi signed a minor-league contract with the Minnesota Twins that included an invitation to spring training. In 119 games split between the Triple–A Rochester Red Wings and Double–A Pensacola Blue Wahoos, he batted a combined .258/.380/.408 with 11 home runs, 47 RBI, and 10 stolen bases. Maggi was selected as an MILB.com Organizational All Star in 2019, and elected free agency following the season on November 4.

On December 20, 2019, Maggi re-signed with the Twins on a new minor league contract. Due to the cancellation of the Minor League Baseball season because of the COVID-19 pandemic, Maggi spent the 2020 season at the alternate training camp for the Twins and became a free agent on November 2, 2020. On February 8, 2021, Maggi re-signed with the Twins on a minor-league contract.

On September 18, 2021, after playing in 86 games for the Triple-A St. Paul Saints, hitting .261 with 16 home runs and 48 runs batted in (RBI), the Twins selected Maggi to their major-league roster. He was optioned back to the Saints on September 20 without appearing in a major-league game, thus making him a "phantom ballplayer". On October 8, Maggi was outrighted off of the 40-man roster. He again became a free agent following the season.

=== Philadelphia Phillies ===
On March 8, 2022, Maggi signed a minor-league contract with the Philadelphia Phillies. In 66 games with the Lehigh Valley IronPigs, he batted .209 with 14 RBIs and 14 stolen bases.

=== Pittsburgh Pirates (second stint) ===
On August 3, 2022, the Phillies traded Maggi to the Pittsburgh Pirates in exchange for cash considerations. He finished the year with the Triple-A Indianapolis Indians, playing in 28 games and compiling a .219/.276/.323 slash line with no home runs, eight RBIs, and eight stolen bases. He elected free agency following the season on November 10.

On December 20, 2022, Maggi re-signed with the Pirates organization on a minor league deal. He was assigned to the Double-A Altoona Curve to begin the year, playing in eight games and going 6-for-31 with three RBIs and one stolen base. On April 23, Maggi had his contract selected to the major-league active roster. He made his major league debut against the Los Angeles Dodgers on April 26 after 1,154 games in the minor leagues and 3,846 at-bats, where he pinch-hit for Andrew McCutchen, striking out. He was welcomed to the batter's box by a standing ovation from the Pirates fans, who were chanting his name. Home plate umpire, Jeff Nelson, allowed Maggi some time to soak in the moment. His debut at-bat started with a 0–1 count after he swung at his first pitch knocking a ball foul deep into the left field stands before ultimately striking out on a ball in the dirt.

The following day, he started at third base, making his fielding debut. Maggi made his first major league assist when he fielded an Austin Barnes groundball and threw to first, ending the top half of the seventh inning. He was replaced in the top of the ninth, ending his first career MLB start going 0–3. Maggi collected his first MLB hit, an RBI single off of Hobie Harris versus the Washington Nationals, on April 29, 2023.

On May 5, the Pirates removed Maggi from the 40-man roster and sent him outright to Double-A Altoona. In 36 games for Altoona, he struggled to a .181/.257/.221 with no home runs and 10 RBI. On July 23, Maggi was released by the Pirates organization.

=== Staten Island FerryHawks ===
On May 19, 2024, Maggi signed with the Staten Island FerryHawks of the Atlantic League of Professional Baseball. In 29 games for the FerryHawks, he batted .235/.301/.343 with three home runs, 15 RBI, and four stolen bases.

=== Detroit Tigers ===
On June 27, 2024, Maggi signed a minor league contract with the Detroit Tigers organization. In 40 appearances for the Triple–A Toledo Mud Hens, he batted .225/.287/.405 with five home runs and 12 RBI. Maggi elected free agency following the season on November 4.

=== Staten Island FerryHawks (second stint) ===
On April 8, 2025, Maggi signed with the Staten Island FerryHawks of the Atlantic League of Professional Baseball. He made 87 appearances for the FerryHawks, batting .249/.342/.381 with seven home runs, 28 RBI, and four stolen bases.

== International baseball ==
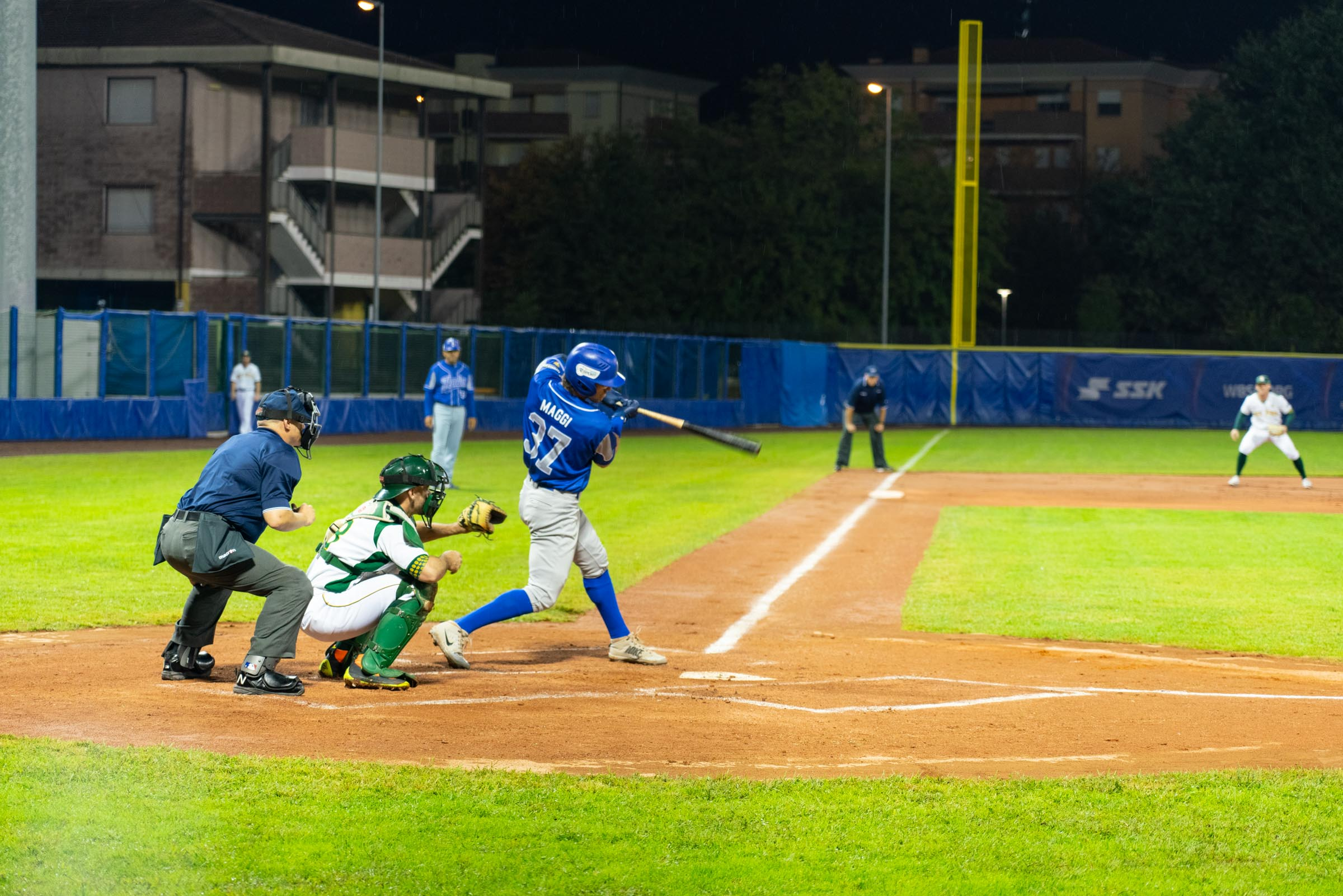
Maggi bats for Italy during the 2020 Olympic qualification

Maggi played in the Dominican Winter League and Mexican Pacific Winter League during the 2016–17 offseason.

Maggi was chosen to represent the Italy national baseball team in the 2017 World Baseball Classic and the 2019 European Baseball Championship. He played for the team at the Africa/Europe 2020 Olympic Qualification tournament in Italy in September 2019 and was suspended for 12 games for his part in a brawl in that tournament on September 21.

== Personal life ==
Maggi has six siblings. Brothers Beau and Joseph also played professional baseball, while Christian played college baseball.

== See also ==
- List of baseball players who have represented more than one nation
