= Estadio Francisco Villa (Durango) =

- Interactive map of Estadio Francisco Villa
- Location: Avenida Universidad Sn, 34100, Durango City, Durango
- Coordinates: 24.015825°N 104.689728°W
- Capacity: 4,983
- Surface: Grass
- Field size: Left Field: 310 feet (94 m); Center Field: 410 feet (120 m); Right Field: 310 feet (94 m)

Construction
- Opened: 1972
- Renovated: 2017–2022

Tenants
- Alacranes de Durango (LMB) (1976–1979); Alacranes de Durango (LMBL) (2016–present); Generales de Durango (LMB) (2017–2023); Caliente de Durango (LMB) (2024–present)

Estadio Francisco Villa is a baseball stadium in Durango City, Durango, Mexico. It is the home field of the Caliente de Durango baseball team, which competes in the Mexican League and the Alacranes de Durango of the Liga Mayor de Béisbol de La Laguna. From 2017 to 2023 it also served as the home ballpark of the Generales de Durango. It holds 4,983 seated spectators.
