= Estadio Resurgimiento =

Baseball stadium in Ciudad del Carmen, Mexico

- Interactive map of Estadio Resurgimiento
- Location: Ciudad del Carmen, Mexico
- Coordinates: 18.647352°N 91.819317°W
- Capacity: 8,200
- Field size: Left field: 335 feet (102 m); Center field: 380 feet (120 m); Right field: 335 feet (102 m)

Construction
- Opened: 1967

Estadio Resurgimiento is a stadium located in Ciudad del Carmen, Mexico. It is primarily used for baseball, and was the home field of the Delfines del Carmen Mexican League baseball club from 2011 through 2016. It has a seating capacity of 8,200 spectators.
