= Jack López =

Puerto Rican baseball player (born 1992)

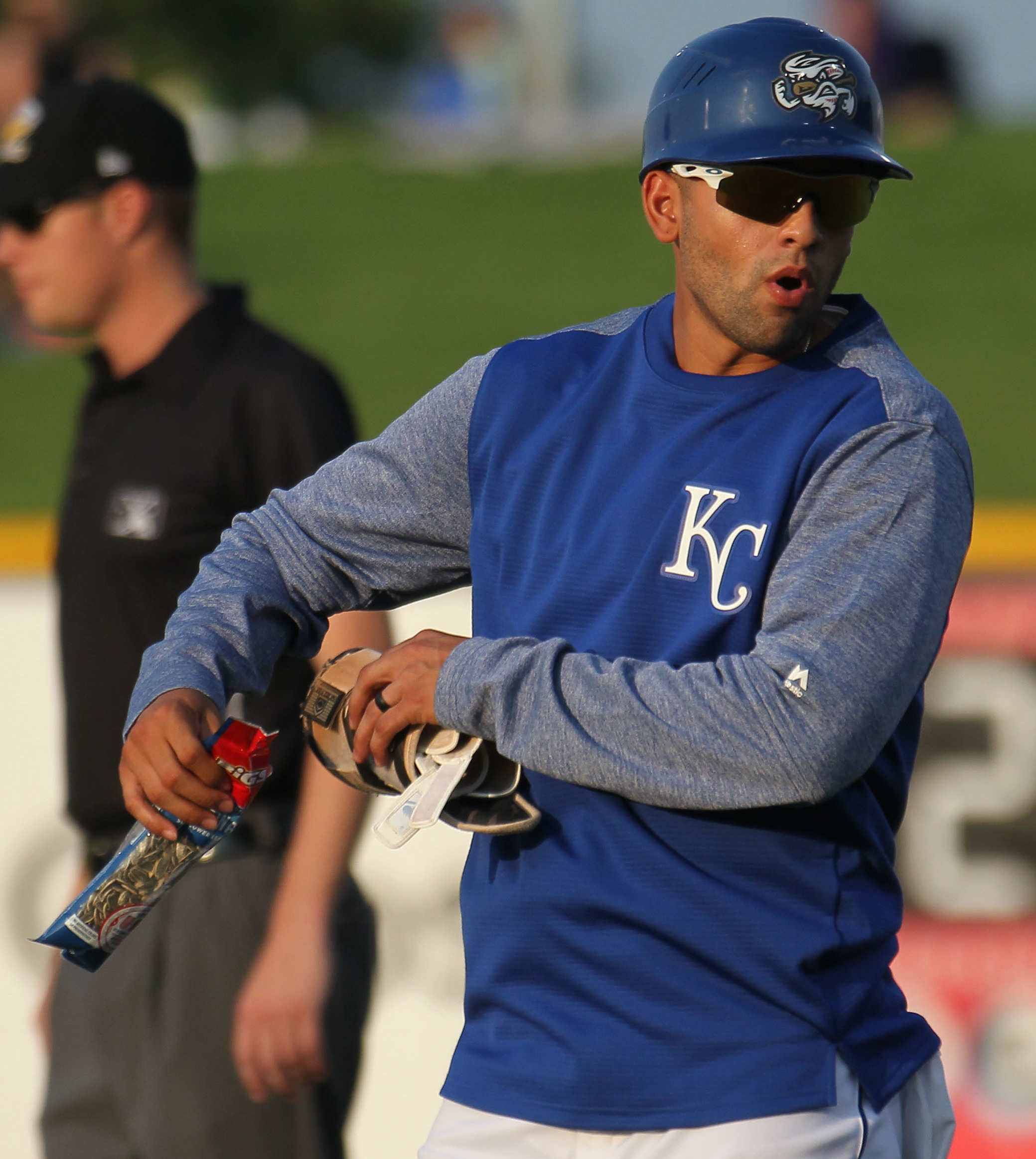
- López with the Omaha Storm Chasers in 2018

Free agent
- Infielder
- Born: December 16, 1992 (age 33); Río Piedras, Puerto Rico
- Bats: Right Throws: Right

MLB debut
- September 5, 2021, for the Boston Red Sox

MLB statistics (through 2024 season)
- Batting average: .238
- Home runs: 1
- Runs batted in: 6
- Stats at Baseball Reference

Teams
- Boston Red Sox (2021); Los Angeles Angels (2024)
Medals
Men's baseball
Representing United States
Olympic Games
Silver medal – second place	2020 Tokyo	Team

Jack Henry López (born December 16, 1992) is a Puerto Rican professional baseball infielder who is a free agent. He has previously played in Major League Baseball (MLB) for the Boston Red Sox and Los Angeles Angels. Listed at 5 feet 10 inches (1.78 m) and 160 pounds (73 kg), he bats and throws right-handed.

== Baseball career ==
=== Amateur career ===
López graduated from Deltona High School in Deltona, Florida. He had a .462 batting average during his senior season and was named to the All-Central Florida baseball team. Although he was offered a full scholarship to play college baseball with the Miami Hurricanes, the Kansas City Royals selected López in the 16th round of the 2011 MLB draft, and he signed with the Royals for a $750,000 bonus.

=== Kansas City Royals ===
López began his professional career in 2012, splitting the season between the Rookie-level Idaho Falls Chukars and the Single-A Kane County Cougars. The following year, López was promoted to the High-A Wilmington Blue Rocks, where he batted .230/.297/.301 with 4 home runs and 45 RBI. He returned to Wilmington in 2014 and 2015, batting .215 and .238, respectively. In 2016, López advanced further through the Royals' farm system, reaching Double-A with the Northwest Arkansas Naturals. For the 2017 season, López began the season in Double-A, and spent the year there aside from a short stint with the Triple-A Omaha Storm Chasers of the Pacific Coast League. In 2018, López spent the year in Omaha, where he slashed .251/.279/.352 with 34 runs batted in (RBI) and a career-high 8 home runs. He elected free agency following the season on November 2, 2018.

=== Atlanta Braves ===
On March 9, 2019, López signed a minor league contract with the Atlanta Braves organization. He appeared in 96 games for the Triple-A Gwinnett Stripers of the International League in 2019, batting .273 with 12 home runs and 57 RBI. López did not play in a game in 2020, as the minor league season was canceled due to the COVID-19 pandemic. He elected free agency on November 2, 2020.

=== Boston Red Sox ===
On January 16, 2021, López signed a minor league contract with the Boston Red Sox organization. He began the season with the Double-A Portland Sea Dogs, and was promoted to the Triple-A Worcester Red Sox. López was on Boston's taxi squad in late August, traveling with the major-league team as a potential roster replacement. He was added to Boston's active roster on September 1, and made his MLB debut that evening against the Tampa Bay Rays. He was returned to Worcester on September 6, recalled to Boston on September 11, and returned to Worcester on September 21. López played in seven games for Boston, batting .154 (2-for-13). In the minor leagues, he played five games for Portland, batting 8-for-19 (.421), and 68 games for Worcester, where he had a .274 average. López became a free agent following the 2021 season.

=== Detroit Tigers ===
On February 9, 2022, López signed a minor league contract with the Detroit Tigers. López played in 95 games for the Triple-A Toledo Mud Hens, batting .167/.205/.287 with 6 home runs, 34 RBI, and 11 stolen bases. He elected free agency following the season on November 10.

=== Los Angeles Angels ===
On April 11, 2023, López signed a minor league contract with the Los Angeles Angels organization. In 93 games for the Triple–A Salt Lake Bees, he batted .277/.333/.476 with 13 home runs and 74 RBI. López elected free agency following the season on November 6.

López re-signed with the Angels on a minor league contract on December 19, 2023. In 104 games for Salt Lake in 2024, he batted .274/.333/.421 with 12 home runs, 57 RBI, and 15 stolen bases. On August 16, 2024, the Angels selected López's contract, adding López to their active roster. In 27 games for the Angels, he slashed .254/.286/.343 with one home run and six RBI. On October 24, López was removed from the 40–man roster and sent outright to Salt Lake. He elected free agency following the season on November 4.

=== Seattle Mariners ===
On January 14, 2025, López signed a minor league contract with the Seattle Mariners. He made 108 appearances for the Triple-A Tacoma Rainiers, slashing .232/.275/.347 with nine home runs, 52 RBI, and 13 stolen bases. López elected free agency following the season on November 6.

=== El Águila de Veracruz ===
On February 19, 2026, López signed with El Águila de Veracruz of the Mexican League. In 29 appearances for the team, he batted .157/.198/.213 with one home run and eight RBI. On July 17, López was released by Veracruz.

== Winter ball ==
López has played in the Puerto Rican Winter League during the minor-league offseason, each year since the 2013–14 season. He has played for several teams in the league, including three seasons with Cangrejeros de Santurce.

López played for the Cangrejeros when they represented Puerto Rico in the Caribbean Series of 2018–19, 2019–20, and 2020–21, batting over .300 in each series.

== International career ==
López represented the Puerto Rico national baseball team at the 2015 Premier12.

On July 2, 2021, López was named to the United States national baseball team for the 2020 Summer Olympics. He was granted a transfer of sports citizenship by the Puerto Rico Baseball Federation. The team went on to win silver, falling to Japan in the gold-medal game.

== Personal life ==
López's father, Juan López, was a minor-league catcher who later served as bullpen coach for three different National League teams during 14 seasons between 1999 and 2013. López's uncle Onix Concepción was a shortstop for the Kansas City Royals, including their 1985 World Series team; he also played one game with the Pittsburgh Pirates.

== See also ==
- List of baseball players who have represented more than one nation
