= Daniel Johnson (baseball) =

American baseball player (born 1995)

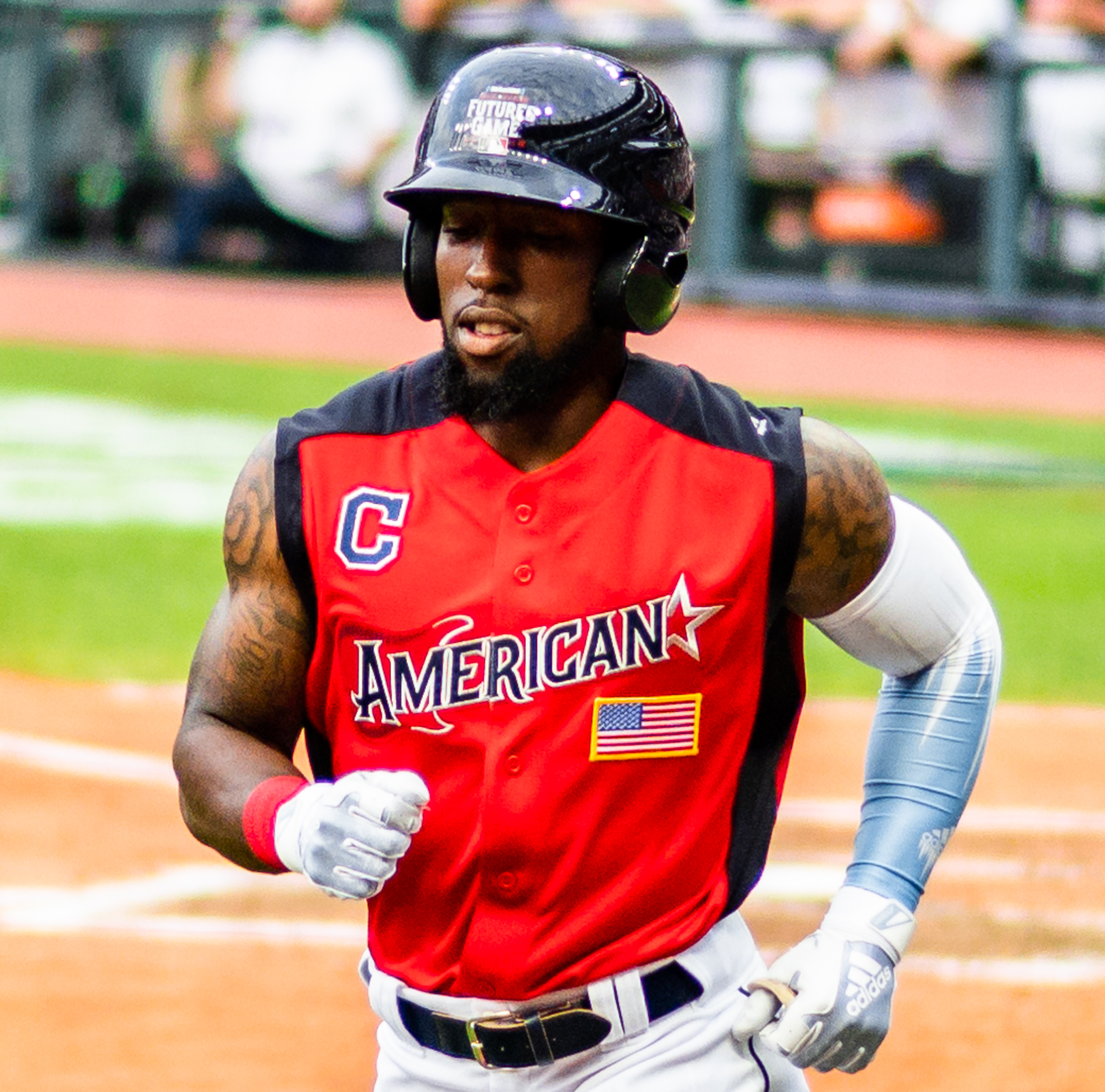
- Johnson at the 2019 All-Star Futures Game

Caliente de Durango – No. 7
- Outfielder
- Born: July 11, 1995 (age 31); Vallejo, California, U.S.
- Bats: Left Throws: Left

MLB debut
- July 25, 2020, for the Cleveland Indians

MLB statistics (through May 3, 2026)
- Batting average: .191
- Home runs: 5
- Runs batted in: 6
- Stats at Baseball Reference

Teams
- Cleveland Indians (2020–2021); Baltimore Orioles (2024); San Francisco Giants (2025); Baltimore Orioles (2025); Houston Astros (2026)

Daniel Johnson Jr. (born July 11, 1995) is an American professional baseball outfielder for the Caliente de Durango of the Mexican League. He has previously played in Major League Baseball (MLB) for the Cleveland Indians, Baltimore Orioles, San Francisco Giants, and Houston Astros.

== Amateur career ==
Johnson was born and raised in Vallejo, California, and attended Jesse M. Bethel High School. In 2013, his senior year, he hit .515. Undrafted in the 2013 Major League Baseball draft, he enrolled at Northeastern Oklahoma A&M College. In 2014, his freshman year, he hit .274 with two home runs and 16 RBIs over 39 games. After the season, he transferred to New Mexico State University where he played baseball for the Aggies. In 2015, his sophomore season, he batted .305 with two home runs and 16 RBIs. As a junior in 2016, he slashed .382/.434/.630 with 12 home runs, fifty RBIs, and 29 stolen bases over 57 games, and was named the Western Athletic Conference Player of the Year.

== Professional career ==
=== Washington Nationals ===
Johnson was drafted by the Washington Nationals in the fifth round of the 2016 Major League Baseball draft. In his first professional season in 2016, Johnson hit .265 with a home run and 14 RBIs over 62 games for the Auburn Doubledays. The Nationals reportedly believed in Johnson's potential not just to stick in center field at higher professional levels, but to produce double-digit home runs as he developed.

Johnson was assigned to the Hagerstown Suns for the 2017 season. Almost right away, Johnson demonstrated significantly greater power and hitting ability with the Suns, hitting ten home runs by the end of May and posting a batting average above .300. Johnson's prowess earned him a spot on the South Atlantic League's Northern Division All-Star team, alongside teammate Carter Kieboom. On July 24, 2017, he was promoted to the Advanced-A Potomac Nationals of the Carolina League. A midseason ranking of prospects by MLB Pipeline that month placed Johnson as the Nationals' tenth-best prospect. Johnson finished the 2017 season with a .298 batting average, 22 home runs, 72 RBIs. and 22 stolen bases across both levels, appearing in 130 total games. He was named the Nationals' Minor League Player of the Year for 2017. In 2018, Johnson battled injuries, but still managed to appear in 89 games for the Harrisburg Senators, slashing .267/.321/.410 with six home runs and 31 RBIs.

=== Cleveland Indians / Guardians ===
On November 30, 2018, Johnson was traded to the Cleveland Indians, along with Jefry Rodríguez and a player to be named later (who was later announced as Andruw Monasterio), for Yan Gomes. He began 2019 with the Akron RubberDucks and was promoted to the Columbus Clippers on May 25, 2019. That July, he played in the 2019 All-Star Futures Game. Over 123 games between Akron and Columbus, he batted .290 with 19 home runs and 77 RBIs.

Johnson was added to the Indians' 40–man roster following the 2019 season. He made the Indians' Opening Day roster for the 2020 season. Johnson made his major league debut on July 25, going hitless in three at-bats. He batted .083 with no home runs or RBI over 12 at-bats in 2020.

On July 18, 2021, Johnson hit his first career home run, a solo shot off of Oakland Athletics starter Chris Bassitt.

Johnson was designated for assignment by the newly-named Cleveland Guardians on November 19, 2021. After clearing waivers, he was outrighted to the Triple-A Columbus Clippers on November 24, 2021.

He began the 2022 season with Triple-A Columbus. In 17 games, he hit .217/.217/.377 with 3 home runs and 11 RBI.

=== New York Mets ===
On May 25, 2022, Johnson was traded to the New York Mets in exchange for cash considerations. Johnson played in 14 games for the Triple-A Syracuse Mets, limping to a .136/.167/.227 line with one home run and 6 RBI. He was released on July 24.

=== Washington Nationals (second stint) ===
On July 29, 2022, Johnson signed a minor league contract with the Washington Nationals organization. Johnson played in 26 games for the Triple-A Rochester Red Wings, hitting just .189/.275/.256 with one home run and eight RBI. He elected free agency following the season on November 10.

=== San Diego Padres ===
On February 23, 2023, Johnson signed a minor league contract with the San Diego Padres organization. In 126 games split between the Double–A San Antonio Missions and Triple–A El Paso Chihuahuas, he batted a cumulative .271/.348/.469 with 19 home runs, 73 RBI, and 30 stolen bases. Johnson elected free agency following the season on November 6.

=== Baltimore Orioles ===
On January 23, 2024, Johnson signed a minor league contract with the Baltimore Orioles. In 118 games for the Triple–A Norfolk Tides, he slashed .259/.320/.448 with 21 home runs, 76 RBI, and 17 stolen bases. On September 21, the Orioles selected Johnson's contract, adding him to their active roster. He made one appearance for Baltimore, grounding out in his only at–bat. On October 31, Johnson was removed from the 40–man roster and sent outright to Norfolk, but rejected the assignment in favor of free agency.

=== Caliente de Durango ===
On February 21, 2025, Johnson signed with the Caliente de Durango of the Mexican League. In 10 games for Durango, Johnson batted .429/.512/.943 with five home runs, 12 RBI, and one stolen base.

=== San Francisco Giants ===
On May 2, 2025, Johnson signed a minor league contract with the San Francisco Giants. In 26 appearances for the Triple-A Sacramento River Cats, he slashed .272/.312/.534 with six home runs, 18 RBI, and five stolen bases. On June 4, the Giants selected Johnson's contract, adding him to their active roster. In 14 appearances for San Francisco, he batted .172/.226/.345 with one home run, one RBI, and one stolen base. Johnson was designated for assignment by the Giants on August 8.

=== Baltimore Orioles (second stint) ===
On August 11, 2025, Johnson was claimed off waivers by the Baltimore Orioles. In 17 appearances for the Orioles, he batted .208/.269/.250 with one stolen base and two walks. Johnson was designated for assignment following the acquisition of George Soriano on November 5. He cleared waivers and was sent outright to the Triple-A Norfolk Tides the following day. However, Johnson rejected the assignment and elected free agency.

=== Miami Marlins ===
On December 29, 2025, Johnson signed a minor league contract with the Miami Marlins. He made five appearances for the Triple-A Jacksonville Jumbo Shrimp, going 1-for-15 (.067) with one walk. Johnson was released by the Marlins organization on April 7, 2026.

=== Houston Astros ===
On April 19, 2026, Johnson signed a minor league contract with the Houston Astros. Johnson made one appearance for the Triple-A Sugar Land Space Cowboys prior to having his contract selected on April 21. In eight appearances for Houston, he went 2-for-14 (.143) with two RBI. On May 4, Johnson was designated for assignment by the Astros. He elected free agency after clearing waivers on May 6. The following day, Johnson re-signed with Houston on a minor league contract. He was released by the Astros organization on May 24.

=== Caliente de Durango (second stint) ===
On June 13, 2026, Johnson signed with the Caliente de Durango of the Mexican League.
