= Willis Otáñez =

Dominican baseball player (born 1973)

- Third baseman
- Born: April 19, 1973 (age 53); Cotuí, Dominican Republic
- Batted: Right Threw: Right

Professional debut
- MLB: August 25, 1998, for the Baltimore Orioles
- CPBL: March 4, 2004, for the Macoto Cobras

Last appearance
- MLB: October 3, 1999, for the Toronto Blue Jays
- CPBL: May 7, 2004, for the Macoto Cobras

MLB statistics
- Batting average: .236
- Home runs: 7
- Runs batted in: 24

CPBL statistics
- Batting average: .298
- Home runs: 7
- Runs batted in: 25
- Stats at Baseball Reference

Teams
- Baltimore Orioles (1998–1999); Toronto Blue Jays (1999); Macoto Cobras (2004)

Willis Alexander Otáñez (born April 19, 1973) is a Dominican former professional baseball infielder. He played in Major League Baseball (MLB) for the Baltimore Orioles and Toronto Blue Jays, and in the Chinese Professional Baseball League (CPBL) for the Macoto Cobras.

== Career ==
Otáñez was originally signed by the Los Angeles Dodgers as an amateur free agent in 1990. He played in the Dodgers farm system through the 1995 season, then was traded along with Miguel Cairo to the Seattle Mariners in exchange for Mike Blowers. He lasted just a couple months with Seattle before being placed on waivers and claimed by the Baltimore Orioles.

Otáñez made his Major League Baseball debut with the Baltimore Orioles on August 25, 1998. He played the remainder of 1998 and part of {1999 with the Orioles before being claimed on waivers by the Toronto Blue Jays. In 2000, he returned to the minor leagues for the Blue Jays.

Otáñez went on to play in the Atlanta Braves organization in 2001, then played for the Bridgeport Bluefish of the Atlantic League of Professional Baseball in 2002. After starting 2003 with the Bluefish, he returned to the Orioles system to finish the season. After spending another half season at Bridgeport in 2004, he has split each subsequent season in the minors and independent leagues and also has played winter ball in the Dominican Professional Baseball League.

Otáñez was named the most valuable player of the 2010 Mexican League season while playing with the Pericos de Puebla. He batted a league-best .393, adding 12 home runs and 76 RBI.
