= 1978 Mexican Baseball League season =

1978 Mexican League season
- League: Mexican League
- Sport: Baseball
- Games: 1211
- Teams: 16

Serie del Rey
- Champions: Rieleros de Aguascalientes
- Runners-up: Algodoneros de Unión Laguna

LMB seasons
- ← 1977 1979 →

The 1978 Mexican League season was the 54th season in the history of the Mexican League. It was contested by sixteen teams, evenly divided in North and South zones. Rieleros de Aguascalientes won the championship by defeating Algodoneros de Unión Laguna in the Serie Final 4 games to 1, led by manager Jaime Favela in his first season as coach. This was the Rieleros first, and as of 2024, only Mexican League championship.

== Standings ==
=== North ===
Northeast
Rank	Team	W	L	T	Pct.	GB
1	Sultanes de Monterrey	80	73	0	.523	—
2	Alijadores de Tampico	76	78	0	.494	4.5
3	Tecolotes de Nuevo Laredo	68	79	2	.463	9.0
4	Mineros de Coahuila	65	85	2	.433	13.5

Northwest
Rank	Team	W	L	T	Pct.	GB
1	Saraperos de Saltillo	88	64	1	.579	—
2	Algodoneros de Unión Laguna	79	72	2	.523	8.5
3	Indios de Ciudad Juárez	69	84	0	.451	19.5
4	Dorados de Chihuahua	60	89	1	.403	26.5

=== South ===
Southeast
Rank	Team	W	L	T	Pct.	GB
1	Cafeteros de Córdoba	95	50	2	.655	—
2	Diablos Rojos del México	70	76	3	.479	25.5
3	Petroleros de Poza Rica	67	84	1	.444	31.0
4	Plataneros de Tabasco	60	90	3	.400	37.5

Southwest
Rank	Team	W	L	T	Pct.	GB
1	Rieleros de Aguascalientes	89	62	0	.589	—
2	Alacranes de Durango	85	65	2	.567	3.5
3	Ángeles de Puebla	85	66	1	.563	4.0
4	Tigres Capitalinos	65	85	1	.433	23.5

== Postseason ==
Quarterfinals
NE1	Sultanes de Monterrey	3
NW2	Algodoneros de Unión Laguna	4
North
NW1	Saraperos de Saltillo	4
NE2	Alijadores de Tampico	2
SE1	Cafeteros de Córdoba	4
SW2	Alacranes de Durango	1
South
SW1	Rieleros de Aguascalientes	4
SE2	Diablos Rojos del México	2

Semifinals
NW2	Algodoneros de Unión Laguna	4
NW1	Saraperos de Saltillo	1
SE1	Cafeteros de Córdoba	2
SW1	Rieleros de Aguascalientes	4

Serie Final
N	Algodoneros de Unión Laguna	1
S	Rieleros de Aguascalientes	4

== League leaders ==
Batting leaders
Stat	Player	Team	Total
AVG	(United States) Romel Canada	Saltillo	.366
HR	(United States) Hal King	Saltillo	28
RBI	(United States) Hal King	Saltillo	114
R	(United States) Romel Canada	Saltillo	108
H	(Dominican Republic) Blas Santana	Unión Laguna	196
SB	(Mexico) Leonardo Valenzuela	Monterrey	29
SB	(Mexico) Antonio Villaescusa	México	29

Pitching leaders
Stat	Player	Team	Total
ERA	(United States) Mike Nagy	Tabasco	1.64
W	(Mexico) José Peña	Córdoba	22
K	(Mexico) Aurelio Monteagudo	Coahuila	222
SV	(United States) Wayne Granger	Durango	21

== Milestones ==
=== Pitchers ===
==== Perfect games ====
- Diego Seguí (COR): On 21 June 1978, Seguí pitched the fourth perfect game in the Mexican League history and the first in franchise history against the Tecolotes de Nuevo Laredo.
- Horacio Piña (AGS): On 12 July 1978, Piña pitched the fifth perfect game in the Mexican League history and the first in franchise history against the Diablos Rojos del México in the first round of the playoffs.

==== No-hitters ====
- Arturo González (MTY): On 28 June 1978, González threw the third no-hitter in franchise history by defeating the Algodoneros de Unión Laguna 2–0.
- Mike Paul (JUA): On 12 July 1978, Paul threw the second no-hitter in franchise history by defeating the Sultanes de Monterrey 1–0 in seven innings.

== Awards ==
LMB Awards
Award	Player	Team	Ref.
Rookie of the Year	(Mexico) Joel Pérez	Alacranes de Durango	
