= Caliente de Durango =

Professional baseball team in the Mexican League

Logo	Cap insignia

Information
- League: Mexican League
- Location: Durango, Durango
- Ballpark: Estadio Francisco Villa
- Established: 2024
- Colors: Red, black and white
- Ownership: Grupo Caliente
- President: Carlos Cedillo
- Manager: Óscar Robles

Current uniforms
Home	Away

Caliente de Durango is a professional baseball team in the Mexican League based in Durango. Their home ballpark is the Estadio Francisco Villa, with a capacity of 6,000 people. The team was established in 2024 after the former Durango's Mexican League franchise, Generales de Durango, was suspended by the league due to its owner's legal problems. The club debuted in the 2024 Mexican League season.

== History ==
The city of Durango had its first professional baseball team in 1956 when the Alacranes de Durango joined the Mexican Central League, a minor league that served as feeder for the Mexican League. After several years playing in the Mexican Central League, the Alacranes joined the Mexican League in 1976 and played for four seasons, from 1976 to 1979.

Professional baseball returned to Durango in 2017, when the Delfines del Carmen moved to Durango and were renamed as Generales de Durango. The Generales played in the Mexican League until 2023, but were suspended by the league in February 2024 after its owner, Venezuelan businessman Carlos Lazo, was involved in legal problems accused of fraud. Lazo also owned the Reds de la Ciudad de México of the Liga de Fútbol Americano Profesional (LFA); the Reds were similarly suspended by the LFA.

In March 2024 it was officially announced that a new team, owned by Grupo Caliente, would be joining the Mexican League as a replacement for the Generales. The new franchise would retain the same players that the Generales had before being suspended and would remain in Durango, playing in the Estadio Francisco Villa. Luis Borges, the Generales manager, and most of the players remained with the new team. The club was presented as Caliente de Durango with red, black and white as its colors, owing to Grupo Caliente's corporate colors. This marked the first time in Mexican professional baseball that a team's name included a corporate sponsor and the decision sparked controversy and mockery amongst fans.

Caliente debuted in the Mexican League on 12 April 2024 against the Saraperos de Saltillo, winning its inaugural game 7–4.

== Roster ==
Caliente de Durango roster
Players	Coaches/Other
Pitchers: 20 (Dominican Republic) Joan Adon; 22 (Mexico) Baltazar Arredondo; 24 (United States) Clayton Andrews; 46 (Dominican Republic) Jorge Bautista; 55 (Mexico) Esteban Bloch; 100 (Mexico) Erick Casillas; 43 (Mexico) Manuel Chávez; 51 (United States) Joseph Corbett; 40 (Cuba) Odrisamer Despaigne; 37 (United States) Scott Engler; 15 (Panama) Jorge García; 89 (United States) Taylor Lehman; 28 (Dominican Republic) Rodolfo Martínez; (United States) Bryce Montes de Oca; 3 (Dominican Republic) Helcris Olivares; (United States) Todd Peterson ∞; 47 (Mexico) Jake Sanchez; 59 (Mexico) Jorge Sauceda; 76 (United States) Devin Smeltzer; 33 (United States) Tanner Tully ∞; 31 (United States) Spencer Turnbull; 96 (Mexico) Héctor Villalobos; 23 (United States) Derek West; Catchers: 61 (Mexico) Christopher Escárrega; 44 (Mexico) Julián León; Infielders: 91 (Mexico) José Álvarez; 9 (Mexico) José Chávez; 5 (Puerto Rico) Yariel González; 76 (United States) C.J. Hinojosa; 16 (Mexico) Victor Márquez; 53 (Venezuela) Leobaldo Piña; 27 (Dominican Republic) Webster Rivas; 17 (Colombia) Reynaldo Rodríguez; 90 (United States) Drew Stankiewicz; 14 (United States) David Villar; 2 (Dominican Republic) Jonathan Villar; Outfielders: 22 (Mexico) Antonio Castañeda; 10 (Dominican Republic) Estevan Florial; 50 (Dominican Republic) Elier Hernández; 7 (United States) Daniel Johnson; 29 (Mexico) Manuel Orduño; 5 (United States) Nick Williams ∞	Manager: 30 (Mexico) Óscar Robles; Coaches: -- (Venezuela) Freddy García (pitching); -- (Mexico) Juan Antonio Peña (coach); 15 (Mexico) Ignacio Rodríguez (bullpen); 35 (Mexico) Miguel Torrero (first base); 7-day injured list; ~ Development list; # Rehab assignment; ∞ Reserve list; ‡ Restricted list; § Suspended list; † Temporarily inactive list; Roster updated August 4, 2026; Transactions; → More rosters: MiLB • Mexican League
