= Bobby Cramer =

American baseball player (born 1979)

- Pitcher
- Born: October 28, 1979 (age 46); Anaheim, California, U.S.
- Batted: Left Threw: Left

Professional debut
- MLB: September 13, 2010, for the Oakland Athletics
- NPB: July 26, 2012, for the Yokohama DeNA BayStars

Last appearance
- MLB: June 9, 2011, for the Oakland Athletics
- NPB: July 26, 2012, for the Yokohama DeNA BayStars

MLB statistics
- Win–loss record: 2–2
- Earned run average: 2.53
- Strikeouts: 19
- Stats at Baseball Reference

Teams
- Oakland Athletics (2010–2011); Yokohama DeNA BayStars (2012)

Career highlights and awards
- LMB: Best Pitcher Award (2010)

Robert Thomas Cramer (born October 28, 1979) is a former professional baseball pitcher.

== Career ==
Cramer signed with the Tampa Bay Devil Rays as a non-drafted free agent in 2003. He did not pitch in 2005 or 2006. He signed a minor league deal with the Athletics on May 18, 2007. Cramer pitched for the Orange County Flyers of the independent Golden League in 2008. He rejoined the Athletics organization in 2009. In 2010, he was loaned to the Tigres de Quintana Roo of the Mexican League. He was returned in August 2010.

He was promoted to the major leagues for the first time on September 10, 2010. In his Major League debut, Cramer defeated the Kansas City Royals 3–1 on September 13, 2010

On July 1, 2011, Cramer was designated for assignment. He was released on July 11.

== Personal life ==
He was married to Larissa Guzman since July 3, 2020.
