= Luis Terrero =

Dominican baseball player (born 1980)

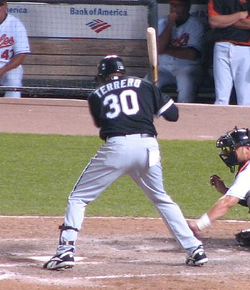
- Terrero batting for the White Sox in 2007
- Outfielder
- Born: May 18, 1980 (age 46); Barahona, Dominican Republic
- Batted: Right Threw: Right

Professional debut
- MLB: July 10, 2003, for the Arizona Diamondbacks
- NPB: March 30, 2012, for the Tohoku Rakuten Golden Eagles

Last appearance
- MLB: September 30, 2007, for the Chicago White Sox
- NPB: June 5, 2012, for the Rakuten Golden Eagles

MLB statistics
- Batting average: .234
- Home runs: 14
- Runs batted in: 52

NPB statistics
- Batting Average: .153
- Home Runs: 1
- Runs batted in: 7
- Stats at Baseball Reference

Teams
- Arizona Diamondbacks (2003–2005); Baltimore Orioles (2006); Chicago White Sox (2007); Tohoku Rakuten Golden Eagles (2012)

Luis Enrique Terrero Gomez (born May 18, 1980) is a Dominican former professional baseball outfielder. He played in Major League Baseball (MLB) for the Arizona Diamondbacks, Baltimore Orioles, and Chicago White Sox, and in Nippon Professional Baseball (NPB) for the Tohoku Rakuten Golden Eagles.

== Career ==
Terrero debuted with the Arizona Diamondbacks in 2003 and remained with the team until 2005. He has also played for the Baltimore Orioles in 2006 and the Chicago White Sox in 2007. In his first game for the White Sox, Terrero hit a home run. Terrero is one of the most recent victims of the hidden ball trick; he fell for the trick on August 10, 2005, during a game against the Florida Marlins.

On October 3, 2007, the Chicago White Sox outrighted Terrero to the minor leagues. However, he declined the assignment and became a free agent. Terrero returned to the Baltimore Orioles organization after signing a minor league contract before the 2008 season.

He won the MVP award during the 2011 Mexican League season while playing with the Diablos Rojos del México.

Signed a 2011 Minor league contract with Colorado Rockies November and was released from his minor league contract on December 9, 2011.

Terrero signed with the Joplin Blasters of the American Association of Independent Professional Baseball for the 2016 season.

== Coaching career ==
In 2026, he was named as hitting coach for the Dominican Summer League Reds the summer-league affiliate of the Cincinnati Reds.
