= Michel Abreu =

Cuban professional baseball player

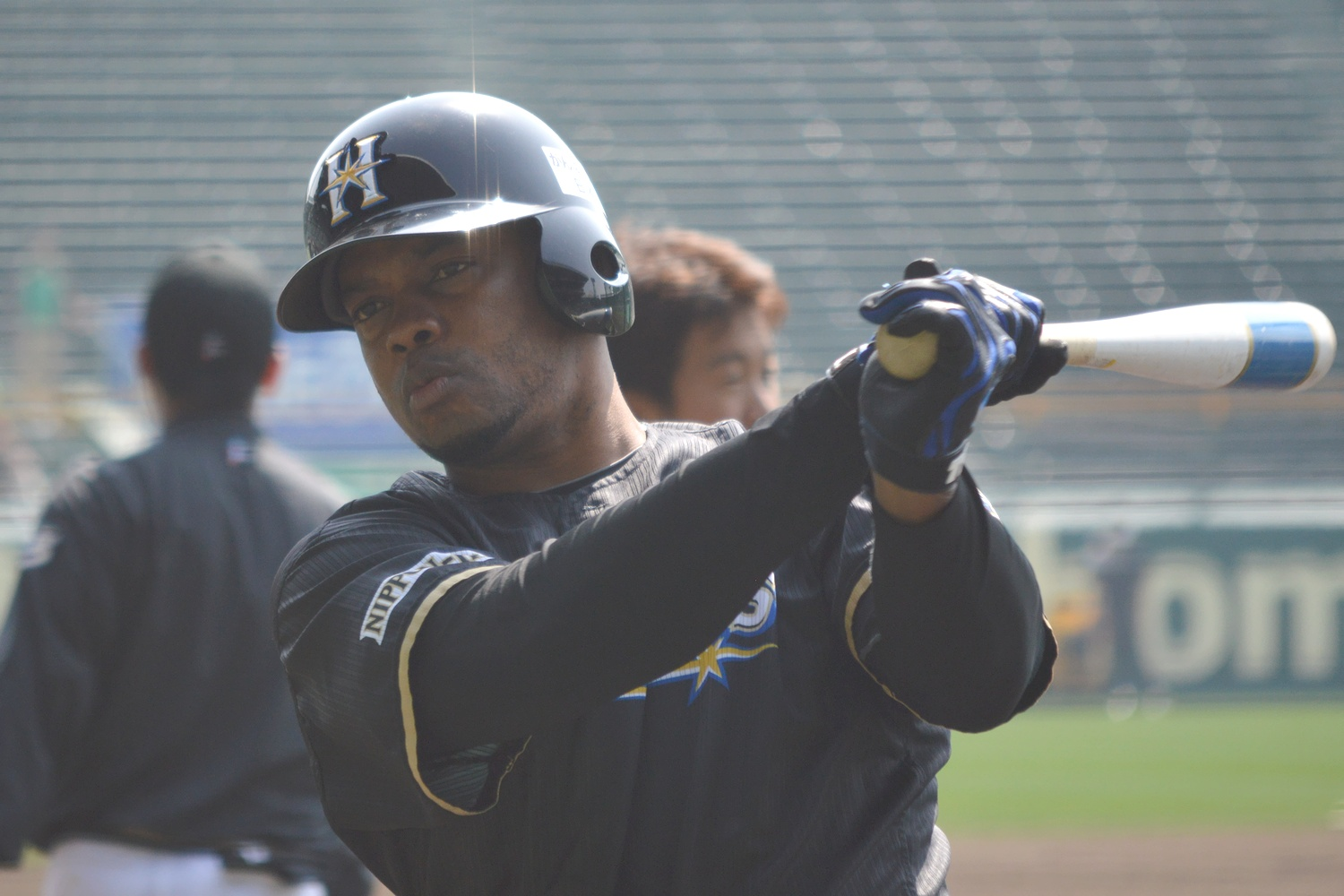
- Abreu with the Hokkaido Nippon-Ham Fighters in 2013
- First baseman
- Born: February 8, 1975 (age 51); Matanzas, Matanzas Province, Cuba
- Batted: Right Threw: Right

NPB debut
- March 29, 2013, for the Hokkaido Nippon-Ham Fighters

Last NPB appearance
- August 2, 2014, for the Hokkaido Nippon-Ham Fighters

NPB statistics
- Batting average: .281
- Home runs: 32
- Runs batted in: 96
- Stats at Baseball Reference

Teams
- Hokkaido Nippon-Ham Fighters (2013–2014)

Career highlights and awards
- Pacific League home run leader (2013); Pacific League Best Nine Award (2013)

Michel Abreu Martinez (born February 8, 1975) is a Cuban former professional baseball player. A first baseman, he previously played for the Hokkaido Nippon-Ham Fighters of Nippon Professional Baseball. Abreu began his professional career in the Cuban National Series and then played in minor league baseball after he defected from Cuba.

== Career ==
Abreu debuted with the Cuban national baseball team in 1999. That year, he was part of the Cuban team that played a two-game exhibition series against the Baltimore Orioles. Domestically, he played in the Cuban National Series for Matanzas. In 2002, he won the Triple Crown, as he led all Cuban players with a.356 batting average, 23 home runs, and 78 runs batted in. He was named the Series Most Valuable Player that season.

Abreu defected from Cuba in February 2004. He attempted to establish residency in Mexico, but after struggling to obtain the necessary documents, he moved to Costa Rica and established residency there. He signed a contract with the Boston Red Sox in September 2005, agreeing to a $425,000 signing bonus. However, the Red Sox began the process of voiding the contract later that month, mainly because Abreu could not establish residency but also because Abreu represented himself as 26 years old, though the roster from the 1999 Orioles-Cuba series gave his date of birth as February 8, 1975, which the Red Sox believed to be his correct date of birth.

The New York Mets signed Abreu to a minor league contract in January 2006. Assigned to the Binghamton Mets of the Class AA Eastern League, Abreu was named to the league's all-star game and led the league in batting average (.332) and on-base percentage (.404). Due to issues obtaining his green card after the expiration of his work visa, Abreu missed the entire 2007 season. He played for the New Orleans Zephyrs of the Class AAA International League in 2008. The Mets invited Abreu to spring training in 2009.

Abreu played in the Mexican League for the Olmecas de Tabasco in 2010 and 2011 and the Sultanes de Monterrey in 2012, winning the league MVP award during his season in Monterrey.

He signed with the Hokkaido Nippon Ham Fighters of Nippon Professional Baseball for the 2013 season, during which he led NPB's Pacific League with 31 home runs. A back injury cost him all of the first half of the 2014 season. He was released on August 21.

== See also ==
- List of baseball players who defected from Cuba
