= Delfines del Carmen =

Mexican baseball team

- Logo

Information
- League: Mexican League (2012–2016)
- Location: Ciudad del Carmen, Campeche
- Ballpark: Estadio Resurgimiento
- Established: 2012
- Folded: 2016
- Colors: Purple, green and white

Current uniforms
Home	Away

The Delfines del Carmen (English: Carmen Dolphins) were a professional baseball team in the Mexican League based in Ciudad del Carmen, Campeche. They played their home games at the Estadio Resurgimiento.

== History ==
In November 2011, Colombian entrepreneur Carlos Mejía bought the Tecolotes de Nuevo Laredo and moved them to Campeche, giving the state two baseball teams, the other being the Piratas de Campeche, based in Campeche City.

The Delfines del Carmen operated in a span of five years from 2012 through 2016 as members of the LMB Zona Sur. They had only two winning seasons, made the playoffs in 2013 and 2014 – including the division title in 2013 – and posted the second worst record of the league in 2016. The team folded at the end of the season.

In November 2016, the Mexican League announced that the franchise would be moved for the 2017 season to Durango, Durango, playing as the Generales de Durango.

== Final roster ==
2016 Delfines del Carmen roster
Players		Coaches
Pitchers: 44 (Mexico) Gaudencio Aguirre; 20 (Mexico) Isaac Castro; 22 (Brazil) Tiago da Silva; 29 (Mexico) Gerardo García; 1 (Mexico) Adrián Garza; 23 (Mexico) Erubiel González; 37 (Mexico) Óscar Hurtado; 38 (United States) Christian Meza; 97 (Mexico) Sergio Mora; 99 (Mexico) Oswaldo Pacheco; 43 (Mexico) Daniel Pérez; 33 (Mexico) Jahir Pérez; 27 (Mexico) Luis Rodríguez; 28 (Mexico) Román Rivas; 57 (Mexico) Benjamín Sandoval; 34 (Mexico) Vanny Valenzuela	Catchers: 7 (Mexico) Eduardo Dehesa; 13 (Mexico) Isidro Piña; Infielders: 8 (Mexico) Hiram Martínez; 12 (Dominican Republic) Gilberto Mejía; 39 (Mexico) Carlos Morales; 10 (Mexico) Jesús Rivera; 25 (Mexico) Horacio Vásquez; Outfielders: 26 (Mexico) Jesús Loya; 53 (Mexico) Francisco Moreno; 65 (Colombia) Jairo Pérez; 3 (United States) Xavier Paul; 82 (Mexico) Flavio Romero	Manager: 35 (Puerto Rico) Orlando Sánchez; Coaches: 17 (Mexico) Lorenzo Buelna (hitting); 40 (Mexico) Jesús Moreno (pitching)

== Season-by-season ==
Season	League	Division	Finish	Wins	Loses	Win%	GB	Postseason	Manager	Ref
2012	LMB	South	6th	51	60	.459	18.5	Did not qualify	(Dominican Republic) Félix Fermín	
2013	LMB	South	1st	63	46	.578	–	Lost in First Round (Veracruz) 1–3	(Dominican Republic) Félix Fermín	
2014	LMB	South	4th	57	54	.514	7.0	Lost in First Round (Tigres) 1–4	(Dominican Republic) Félix Fermín	
2015	LMB	South	7th	51	59	.464	14.0	Did not qualify	(Dominican Republic) Félix Fermín	
2016	LMB	South	8th	31	76	.290	44.5	Did not qualify	(Dominican Republic) José Offerman (Puerto Rico) Orlando Sánchez	
Totals				W	L	Win%				
Totals				253	295	.462	All-time regular season record (2012–2016)			
Totals				2	4	.222	All-time postseason record			
Totals				255	299	.460	All-time regular and postseason record			

== Notable players ==
- Winston Abreu
- Adán Amezcua
- Willy Aybar
- Tim Corcoran
- Tiago da Silva
- Yadir Drake
- Freddy Guzmán
- Esteban Loaiza
- Josh Lueke
- Rubén Mateo
- Xavier Paul
- René Reyes
- Rubén Rivera
- Henry Rodríguez
- Sandy Rosario
- Kalian Sams
- Gabe Suárez
