= C.J. Hinojosa =

American baseball player (born 1994)

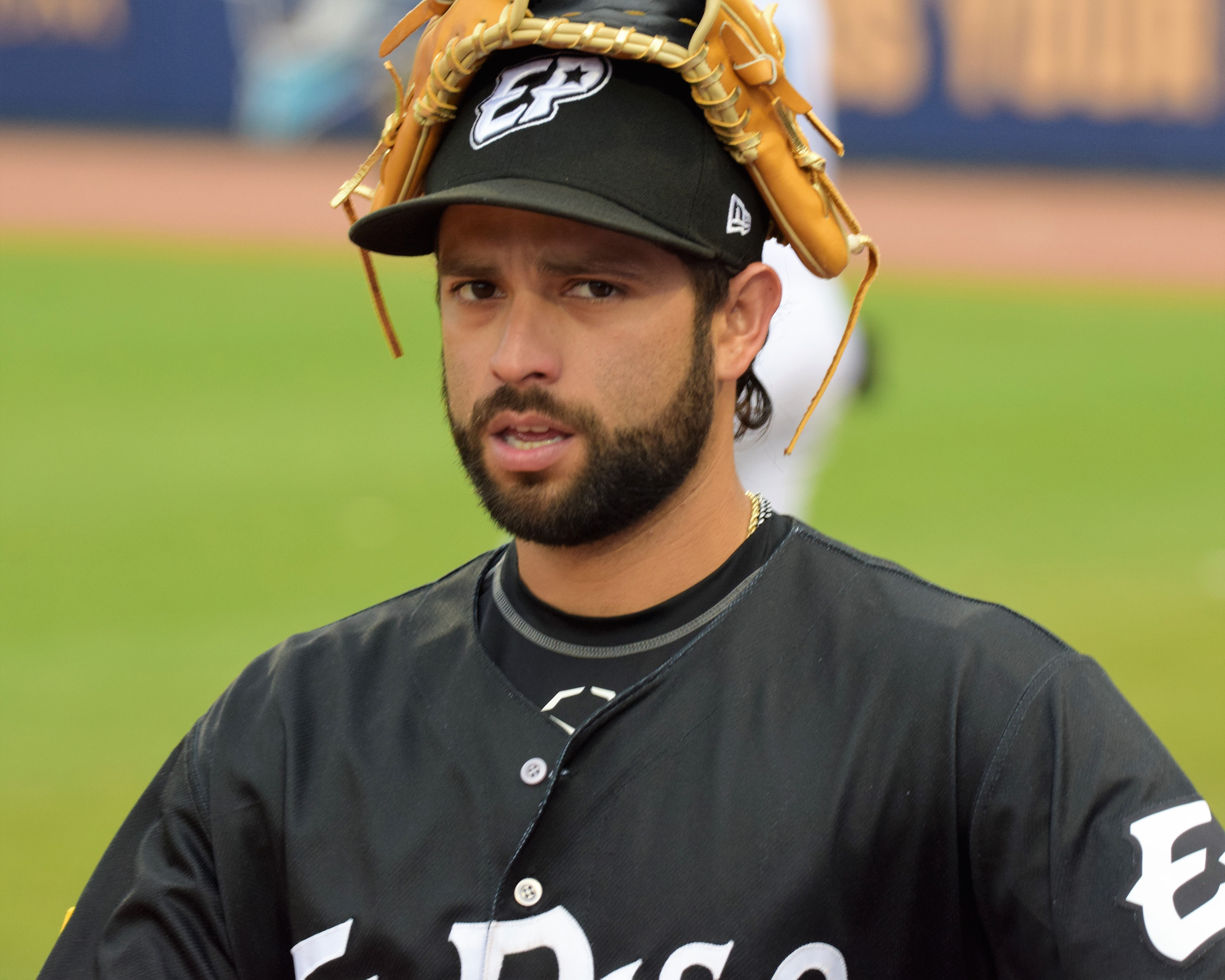
- Hinojosa with the El Paso Chihuahuas in 2022

Caliente de Durango – No. 14
- Infielder
- Born: July 15, 1994 (age 32); Houston, Texas, U.S.
- Bats: Right Throws: Right

Christopher Jesse Hinojosa (born July 15, 1994) is an American professional baseball infielder for the Caliente de Durango of the Mexican League.

== Amateur career ==
Hinojosa was born in Houston, Texas and attended Klein Collins High School. He was selected in the 26th round of the 2012 Major League Baseball draft by the Houston Astros, but did not sign with the team. Hinojosa played college baseball for the Texas Longhorns and was a starter for three seasons. In 2013 and 2014, he played collegiate summer baseball with the Harwich Mariners of the Cape Cod Baseball League.

== Professional career ==
=== San Francisco Giants ===
Hinojosa was selected in the 11th round, with the 336th overall selection, of the 2015 MLB draft by the San Francisco Giants. After signing with the team, he was assigned to the Salem-Keizer Volcanoes of the Low–A Northwest League. Hinojosa started the 2016 season with the High–A San Jose Giants, where he batted .296 in 69 games before being promoted to the Double-A Richmond Flying Squirrels. He hit .248 with Richmond before suffering a ruptured Achilles tendon in the final series of the season. Hinojosa was suspended for the first 50 games of the 2018 season after testing positive for a non-performance-enhancing drug for a second time. He returned to Richmond and finished the season with a .261 average with three home runs and 26 RBI in 67 games played.

=== Milwaukee Brewers ===
Hinojosa was traded to the Milwaukee Brewers in exchange for Erik Kratz on March 25, 2019. He was assigned to the Biloxi Shuckers of the Double–A Southern League. Hinojosa batted .280 during the regular season and slashed .400/.393/.800 with four doubles, two home runs and nine RBIs in the Southern League playoffs. He was transferred to the Triple-A San Antonio Missions at the end of the season. Hinojosa did not play in a game in 2020 due to the cancellation of the minor league season because of the COVID-19 pandemic. He was released by the Brewers organization on June 4, 2020. After the 2020 minor league season was canceled, Hinojosa played in the temporary independent Constellation Energy League for the Sugar Land Lightning Sloths.

=== Houston Astros ===
On January 25, 2021, Hinojosa signed a minor league contract with the Houston Astros. Hinojosa spent the season with the Triple-A Sugar Land Skeeters and batted .316 with 11 home runs and 67 RBI in 107 games played. Hinojosa became a free agent at the end of the season on November 7.

=== San Diego Padres ===
On December 16, 2021, Hinojosa signed a minor league contract with the San Diego Padres. He was named to the Padres' 2022 spring training roster as a non-roster invitee. Hinojosa spent the year with the Triple–A El Paso Chihuahuas, playing in 122 games and batting .291/.359/.482 with career–highs in home runs (17) and RBI (83). He elected free agency following the season on November 10, 2022.

=== Miami Marlins ===
On December 15, 2022, Hinojosa signed a minor league contract with the Miami Marlins organization. He played the 2023 season with the Triple–A Jacksonville Jumbo Shrimp, appearing in 91 games and batting .244/.284/.357 with seven home runs and 38 RBI. Hinojosa elected free agency following the season on November 6, 2023.

=== Tampa Bay Rays ===
On January 29, 2024, Hinojosa signed a minor league contract with the Tampa Bay Rays organization that included an invitation to spring training. He made 106 appearances for the Triple-A Durham Bulls, batting .223/.284/.329 with seven home runs and 33 RBI. Hinojosa elected free agency following the season on November 4.

=== Caliente de Durango ===
On June 2, 2025, Hinojosa signed with the Caliente de Durango of the Mexican League. In 43 games he hit .310/.366/.407 with 0 home runs, 15 RBIs and 4 stolen bases.
