= Generales de Durango =

- Logo

Information
- League: Mexican League (Zona Norte)
- Location: Durango, Durango
- Ballpark: Estadio Francisco Villa
- Founded: 2016
- Folded: 2024
- Colors: Green, yellow, white
- Ownership: Grupo Xoy Capital
- Website: www.clubgeneralesdedurango.com

The Generales de Durango (English: Durango Generals) were a professional baseball team in the Mexican League (LMB) that was established in November 2016. The team was based in Durango, the capital and largest city of the Mexican state of Durango. They entered the league in 2017 as a replacement for the departed Delfines del Carmen. In 2024, the Generales were replaced by Caliente de Durango, after the team was suspended by the LMB.

== History ==
=== Creation ===
In November 2016, LMB owners approved the move of the Delfines from Ciudad del Carmen, Campeche, to Durango, restoring professional baseball to the state for the first time since the Alacranes de Durango moved to Campeche to become the Piratas de Campeche in 1980. A remodeled Estadio de Béisbol Francisco Villa in Durango was announced as the home venue. The move was nearly put in danger by economic risk, as reports circulated that the Generales would not play in 2017 due to the owner's lack of financial resources and delays in the remodeling of the stadium. The franchise managed to begin play, though a delay of the planned opening game in the stadium was necessary.

=== Initial season ===
The Generales finished the 2017 season with a 43–66 record, last in the North Division. Yadir Drake led the team in hitting with a .385 average; he and Jairo Pérez had 14 home runs. Pérez led the team in RBI with 65. Fernando Nieve had the lowest ERA, 2.25. Mario González led the team in strikeouts with 77. Amilcar Gaxiola had the most wins, seven.

=== Suspension and reinstatement (2017) ===
In September 2017, the league announced that the Generales would take the 2018 season off, to reorganize their finances, and return in 2019. However, this decision was appealed by the Generales. At a subsequent league meeting in November 2017, the decision was made that the Generales would compete in 2018, subject to a two-year guarantee of financial solvency.

=== Suspension (2024) ===
It was announced on 22 February 2024 that the Generales would be provisionally suspended for the 2024 season. In March 2024, the league indefinitely suspended the team due to fraud allegations against the club owner, Venezuelan businessman Carlos Lazo. The Generales were later replaced by Caliente de Durango. On 24 April 2024, Lazo was arrested in Las Vegas.

== Roster ==
Generales de Durango roster
Players	Coaches/Other
Pitchers: 30 Octavio Acosta; 65 Jose Adames; 35 Rodrigo Benoit; 31 Victor Buelna; 99 Lupe Chavez; 22 Tiago da Silva; 32 Neftalí Feliz; 41 Ryan Flores; -- J. D. Hammer; 19 Ricardo Hernandez; 10 Isaac Jimenez; 26 Ozzie Mendez; 92 Luis Payan; 6 Juan Robles; 81 Joel Sosa; 29 Nico Tellache; 44 Jake Thompson; 90 Edwyn Valle; Catchers: 14 Carlos Garzon; 54 Alfredo Meza; 72 Juan Uriarte; Infielders: 16 Victor Marquez; 58 Jefry Marté; 59 Jose Manuel Orozco; 24 Michael Robles; 23 Juan Rodriguez; 27 Javier Sanchez; Outfielders: 1 Alfredo Lopez; 33 Elmer Lopez; 50 Alberth Martinez; 45 Manny Olloque; 77 Santiago Gonzalez; 53 Ademar Rifaela; 57 Edisson Valle	Manager Coaches: 11 Tony Aguilera; 25 Raúl Chávez; 9 Efren Espinoza; 39 Luis Montano; 15 Ignacio Rodriguez; 62 Cristobal Rodriguez; 7-day injured list; ~ Development list; # Rehab assignment; ∞ Reserve list; ‡ Restricted list; § Suspended list; † Temporarily inactive list; Roster updated June 6, 2024; Transactions; → More rosters: MiLB • Mexican League

== Season-by-season ==
Season	League	Division	Finish	Wins	Loses	Win%	GB	Postseason	Manager	Ref
2017	LMB	North	8th	43	66	.394	32.5	Did not qualify	(Cuba) Joe Álvarez	
2018	LMB	North	6th	24	33	.421	13.0	Did not qualify	(Mexico) Matías Carrillo	
2018	LMB	North	7th	22	32	.400	19.0	Did not qualify	(Mexico) Matías Carrillo	
2019	LMB	North	7th	47	72	.395	27.5	Did not qualify	(United States) Lorenzo Bundy (Mexico) Efrén Espinoza (Mexico) Juan José Pacho	
2021	LMB	North	9th	20	45	.308	27.0	Did not qualify	(Dominican Republic) Félix Fermín	
2022	LMB	North	8th	37	53	.411	25.0	Did not qualify	(Venezuela) Álvaro Espinoza (Cuba) Joe Álvarez	
2023	LMB	North	7th	43	43	.500	7.0	Did not qualify	(Mexico) Óscar Robles	
Totals				W	L	Win%				
Totals				236	344	.407	All-time regular season record (2017–2023)			
Totals				0	0	–	All-time postseason record			
Totals				236	344	.407	All-time regular and postseason record			
