= Amauri Sanit =

Cuban baseball player (born 1979)

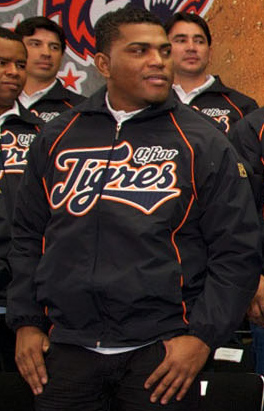
- Sanit with Tigres de Quintana Roo at Los Pinos in 2013
- Pitcher
- Born: July 4, 1979 (age 47); Havana, Cuba
- Batted: Right Threw: Right

MLB debut
- May 12, 2011, for the New York Yankees

Last appearance
- June 10, 2011, for the New York Yankees

MLB statistics
- Win–loss record: 0–0
- Earned run average: 12.86
- Strikeouts: 4
- Stats at Baseball Reference

Teams
- New York Yankees (2011)

Amauri Sanit Sabouren (born July 4, 1979) is a Cuban former professional baseball pitcher. Sanit played for the Industriales of the Cuban National Series before defecting from Cuba in 2006. He pitched in Major League Baseball for the New York Yankees in 2011, before joining the Tigres in 2012.

== Playing career ==
Sanit grew up boxing, but switched to baseball at age 16. He became a closer in the Cuban National Series for the Industriales. When Cuban officials became aware of Sanit's desire to play in the United States, they began to hold back his career to prevent him from being showcased, not allowing him to play on the Cuban national baseball team. As a result, Sanit defected in 2006.

Sanit arrived in Mexico, then he went to Costa Rica. Later he went to Guatemala where he had a record of 4–0 and 0.00 of ERA. Then he went to Panama before going to the Dominican Republic.

In the Dominican Republic in 2008, the New York Yankees of Major League Baseball discovered Sanit and signed him to a minor league contract. Sanit was invited to the Yankees' spring training camp in 2010, but failed to make the final roster. While a member of the Scranton/Wilkes-Barre Yankees of the Class AAA International League in 2010, he was suspended for 50 games for the use of performance-enhancing drugs.

Sanit made his major league debut on May 12, 2011, after the Yankees purchased his contract earlier in the day. As of 2016 he was one of 12 Yankees pitchers since 1919 to make his debut after turning 29 years old, with the most recent being Richard Bleier in 2016.

On June 16, the Yankees released Sanit to clear a 40-man roster spot for Brian Gordon.

In 2012, Sanit signed with the Tigres de Quintana Roo of the Mexican League. He pitched against the Texas Rangers of MLB in an exhibition in 2014.

== See also ==
- List of baseball players who defected from Cuba
