= Daniel Rodríguez (baseball) =

Mexican baseball player (born 1984)

Olmecas de Tabasco
- Pitcher / Coach
- Born: December 11, 1984 (age 41); Culiacán, Sinaloa, Mexico
- Bats: Left Throws: Left
- Stats at Baseball Reference

Héctor Daniel Rodríguez (born December 11, 1984) is a Mexican former professional baseball pitcher who currently serves as the pitching coach for the Olmecas de Tabasco of the Mexican League.

== Playing career ==
=== Saraperos de Saltillo ===
Rodríguez played for the Saraperos de Saltillo of the Mexican League for seven seasons from 2006 to 2012.

=== Atlanta Braves ===
The Atlanta Braves signed Rodríguez on August 17, 2012. In 2013, Rodríguez played for the Mexico national baseball team in the 2013 World Baseball Classic. Rodríguez was invited to Spring Training for the 2014 season but did not make the club.

=== Baltimore Orioles ===
On January 23, 2015, the Braves traded Rodríguez to the Baltimore Orioles in exchange for cash. On May 5, 2015, Rodríguez was loaned to his former club, the Saraperos de Saltillo. On February 3, 2016, Rodríguez re-signed with the Orioles on a minor league contract.

=== Mexican League ===
On April 5, 2016, the Orioles again loaned Rodríguez to the Saraperos de Saltillo. On April 4, 2017, Rodríguez re-signed with the Saraperos for the 2017 season. On April 3, 2019, Rodríguez signed with the Acereros de Monclova. Rodríguez did not play in a game in 2020 due to the cancellation of the Mexican League season because of the COVID-19 pandemic. On November 15, 2022, Rodríguez was traded back to Saltillo. On April 27, 2023, Rodríguez was waived by the Saraperos.

== Coaching career ==
Rodríguez joined the Olmecas de Tabasco of the Mexican League as the team's bullpen coach for the 2025 season. On June 17, 2025, Rodríguez assumed the role of pitching coach.
