= Rieleros de Aguascalientes =

Mexican professional baseball team

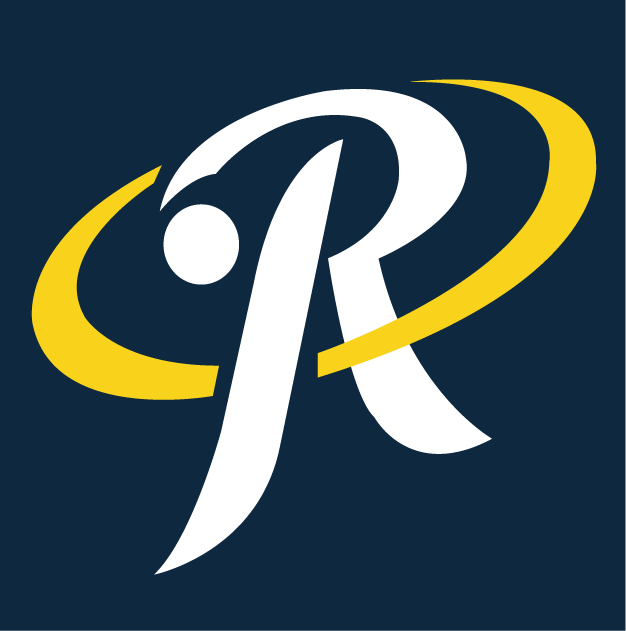
| Logo | Cap insignia |

Information
- League: Mexican League (North)
- Location: Aguascalientes, Aguascalientes
- Ballpark: Parque Alberto Romo Chávez
- Established: 1975; 51 years ago
- Serie del Rey champions: 1 (1978)
- Division championships: 2 (1978, 2012)
- Colors: Navy blue, gold and white
- President: Eustacio Álvarez
- Manager: Adán Muñoz
- Website: www.rielerosags.com

Current uniforms
| Home | Away |

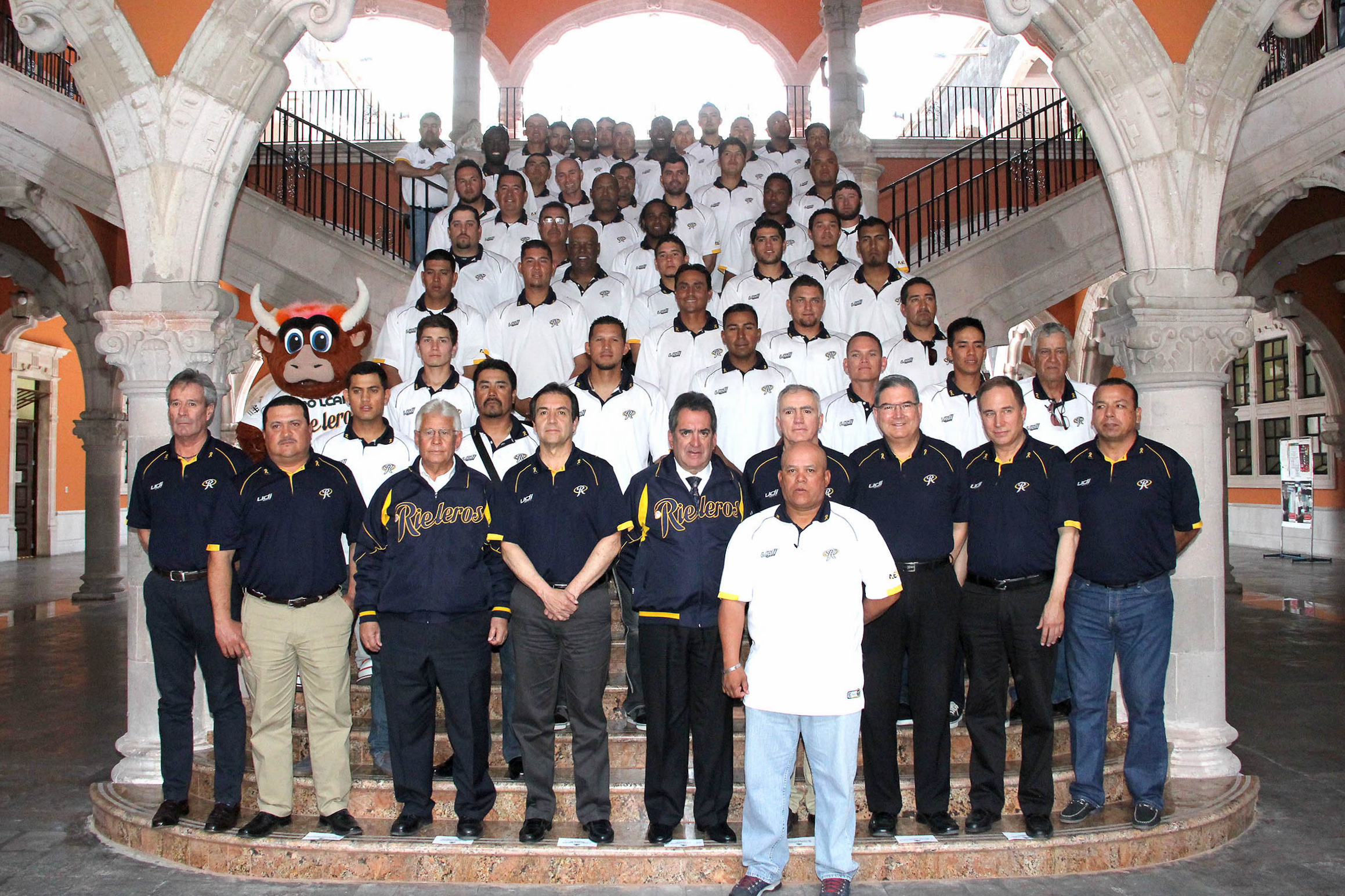
The 2015 Rieleros de Aguascalientes

The Rieleros de Aguascalientes (English: Aguascalientes Railroaders) are a professional baseball team based in Aguascalientes, Aguascalientes that competes in the Mexican League. Established in 1975, the Rieleros have won the Mexican League championship once in 1978. The team plays at the Parque Alberto Romo Chávez.

== History ==
Baseball arrived in Aguascalientes in hand with the railroad at the beginning of the 20th century. A group of Mexican and American railroad workers on the Mexican Central Railway held a baseball game in March 1902. The teams, the Aguascalientes Mexicans and American Railways, played the first game in the state on the railroad's land.

The Rieleros were founded in 1975 by Raúl Medina Reyes in partnership with Don Pedro Barbosa, José Ortiz Benavides and other local entrepreneurs, who bought the Veracruz franchise and moved it to Aguascalientes. Funds were raised through the issue of shares. A survey was then conducted to select a team name. The name Rieleros was chosen to honor the area's railroad heritage. The team debuted in the Mexican League on 14 March 1975 losing 1–5 against the Charros de Jalisco in the Parque Alberto Romo Chávez.

In 1978, the Rieleros won the Mexican League championship, managed by Jaime Favela in his first season as manager. With players such as Horacio Piña, Cecilio Acosta, Ángel Moreno, Willie Crawford, Clarence Jones and Chico Rodríguez, the Rieleros finished as leaders of the Southwest division with a 89–62 record. In the quarterfinals, the Rieleros defeated the Diablos Rojos del México 4–2, including a perfect game by Piña. In the semifinals, Aguascalientes defeated the Cafeteros de Córdoba in six games, 4–2. In the championship game, the Rieleros defeated the Algodoneros de Unión Laguna 4–1 to claim their first (and as of 2024, only) Mexican League championship.

In December 1999, the Rieleros franchise was bought by a group of businessmen from Puebla and renamed to Pericos de Puebla, who started to play in the 2000 season. In December 2003, ahead of the 2004 Mexican League season, the Cafeteros de Córdoba franchise was moved from Córdoba, Veracruz to Aguascalientes, bringing baseball back after a hiatus of four years.

In 2008, the Rieleros de Aguascalientes were transferred to Nuevo Laredo, Tamaulipas, and were renamed the Tecolotes de Nuevo Laredo. They returned to Aguascalientes in 2012 after the Dorados de Chihuahua franchise was relocated.

== Roster ==
Rieleros de Aguascalientes roster
| Players | Coaches/Other |
|---|---|
| Pitchers: 77 (Venezuela) Adrián Almeida; 7 (Mexico) Hendrick Briones ∞; 24 (United States) Jimmy Burnette; -- (United States) Christian Cosby; 49 (Dominican Republic) Óscar de la Cruz; 35 (United States) Greg Duncan; 71 (Dominican Republic) Elniery García ∞; 45 (Mexico) Mario García; 17 (Dominican Republic) Harol González; 81 (Mexico) Porfirio Guerrero; 36 (Nicaragua) Ronald Medrano; 85 (Dominican Republic) Juan Mercedes; 38 (United States) Deylen Miley ∞; 75 (Venezuela) Luis Pacheco; 50 (United States) Cam Robinson; 20 (Dominican Republic) Ramón Rosso ∞; 29 (Canada) Nick Trogrlic-Iverson; 37 (Venezuela) Jonathan Vargas; Catchers: 5 (Venezuela) Eduardo Antonini; 1 (Mexico) Carlos Mendivil ∞; 30 (Venezuela) Ángel Reyes; -- (Venezuela) David Rodríguez; 3 (Mexico) Fernando Villalobos; 73 (Mexico) Heber Villalobos; Infielders: 6 (United States) Matthew Batten; 15 (Mexico) Ángel Camacho; 4 (Mexico) Ángel Erro; 14 (United States) Matt McDermott; 16 (Venezuela) Gabriel Noriega; 2 (Dominican Republic) Jomar Reyes; 26 (Mexico) Emiliano Vega; Outfielders: 87 (Mexico) Abiel Amador; 27 (Mexico) Amilcar Gómez; 20 (Mexico) José Manuel Orozco; 47 (Mexico) Sergio Pérez; 32 (Cuba) Maikel Serrano | Manager: -- (Mexico) Adán Muñoz; Coaches: -- (Mexico) Tony Aguilera; -- (Venezuela) José Amado (bench); -- (Venezuela) Giovanni Carrara (pitching); 32 (Mexico) Jesús Moreno (pitching); 43 (Mexico) Alberto Rivera; -- (Mexico) Luis Silva; 7-day injured list; ~ Development list; # Rehab assignment; ∞ Reserve list; ‡ Restricted list; § Suspended list; † Temporarily inactive list; Roster updated August 4, 2026; Transactions; → More rosters: MiLB • Mexican League |

== Championships ==
| Season | Manager | Opponent | Series score | Record |
|---|---|---|---|---|
| 1978 | Jaime Favela | Algodoneros de Unión Laguna | 4–1 | 101–67 |
| Total championships | | | 1 | |

== Award winners and league leaders ==
=== Awards ===
==== Most Valuable Player ====
- Jesse Castillo (2017)

==== Manager of the Year ====
- Enrique Reyes (2012)
- Homar Rojas (2017)

=== League leaders ===
==== Batting champions ====
- Larry Fritz (1976)
- Vic Davalillo (1977)

==== Home runs ====
- Eddie Ríos (2006)
- Carlos M. Rodríguez (2012)
- Félix Pérez (2018)

==== Runs ====
- Jim Obradovich (1981)
- Enrique Aguilar (1987)

==== Runs batted in ====
- Enrique Aguilar (1983)
- Eddie Ríos (2006)
- Diory Hernández (2016)

==== Hits ====
- Gonzalo Villalobos (1975)
- Vic Davalillo (1980)
- Rontrez Johnson (2004)

==== Stolen bases ====
- Rontrez Johnson (2004)

==== E.R.A. ====
- Horacio Piña (1977)

==== Wins ====
- Humberto Montemayor (2012)
