= 2019 Minnesota Twins season =

2019 Minnesota Twins
- American League Central champions
- League: American League
- Division: Central
- Ballpark: Target Field
- City: Minneapolis, Minnesota
- Record: 101–61 (.623)
- Divisional place: 1st
- Owners: Jim Pohlad
- President of baseball operations: Derek Falvey
- General managers: Thad Levine
- Managers: Rocco Baldelli
- Television: Fox Sports North (Dick Bremer, Bert Blyleven, Justin Morneau) (Marney Gellner) (Audra Martin)
- Radio: WCCO (Cory Provus, Dan Gladden)
- Stats: ESPN.com; Baseball Reference

The 2019 Minnesota Twins season was the 59th season for the Minnesota Twins franchise in the Twin Cities of Minnesota, their 10th season at Target Field and the 119th overall in the American League. It was the first year under new manager Rocco Baldelli who was hired on October 25, 2018, following the firing of previous manager Paul Molitor on October 2. It was also the first season since 2004 without longtime Twin Joe Mauer on the roster, as he announced his retirement on November 9, 2018, after 15 seasons. His number 7 was retired on June 15, 2019.

They improved upon their record from the previous season, and clinched the AL Central division for the first time since 2010 on September 25. On September 26, the Twins scored their 99th win with a victory over the Detroit Tigers, the highest number of wins for the franchise since 1965, and the third highest in franchise history. Despite winning 101 games (the second most since moving to Minnesota), the Twins were still the third seed in the American League, the best record ever for a third seed. With 307 home runs by their hitters, the Twins also set a new major league record for most home runs by a team in a season, later matched by the 2023 Atlanta Braves. They opened the playoffs by playing the New York Yankees in the ALDS, however they were swept 3 games to 0 in a best-of-5 series, extending their record for the longest playoff losing streak in MLB history to 16 games.

== Regular season ==
=== Game log ===
2019 game log: 101–61 (Home: 46–35; Away: 55–26)
March/April: 17–10 (Home: 9–5; Away: 8–5)

#	Date	Opponent	Score	Win	Loss	Save	Attendance	Record	Streak
1	March 28	Indians	2–0	**Berríos** (1–0)	Kluber (0–1)	**Rogers** (1)	39,519	1–0	W1
2	March 30	Indians	1–2	Edwards (1–0)	**Parker** (0–1)	Hand (1)	15,271	1–1	L1
3	March 31	Indians	9–3	**Pérez** (1–0)	Carrasco (0–1)	—	15,613	2–1	W1
4	April 2	@ Royals	5–4 (10)	**Hildenberger** (1–0)	Boxberger (0–1)	**Parker** (1)	10,024	3–1	W2
5	April 3	@ Royals	7–6	**May** (1–0)	Peralta (0–1)	**Parker** (2)	10,575	4–1	W3
6	April 5	@ Phillies	4–10	Pivetta (1–0)	**Odorizzi** (0–1)	—	28,021	4–2	L1
7	April 6	@ Phillies	6–2	**Pineda** (1–0)	Arrieta (1–1)	—	44,693	5–2	W1
8	April 7	@ Phillies	1–2	Eflin (2–0)	**Berríos** (1–1)	Neris (1)	39,735	5–3	L1
9	April 9	@ Mets	14–8	**Hildenberger** (2–0)	deGrom (2–1)	—	22,126	6–3	W1
10	April 10	@ Mets	6–9	Syndergaard (1–1)	**Odorizzi** (0–2)	—	20,946	6–4	L1
—	April 12	Tigers	**Postponed (snow)** (Makeup date: May 11.)						
11	April 13	Tigers	4–3	**Pineda** (2–0)	Ross (1–2)	**Parker** (3)	16,484	7–4	W1
12	April 14	Tigers	6–4	**Berríos** (2–1)	Zimmermann (0–2)	**Hildenberger** (1)	14,774	8–4	W2
13	April 15	Blue Jays	3–5	Gaviglio (1–0)	**Mejía** (0–1)	Biagini (1)	11,727	8–5	L1
14	April 16	Blue Jays	5–6	Sanchez (2–1)	**May** (1–1)	Giles (5)	13,365	8–6	L2
15	April 17	Blue Jays	4–1	**Odorizzi** (1–2)	Thornton (0–2)	**Parker** (4)	11,465	9–6	W1
16	April 18	Blue Jays	4–7	Biagini (1–1)	**Pineda** (2–1)	Giles (6)	12,523	9–7	L1
-	April 19	@ Orioles	**Postponed (rain)** (Makeup date: April 20.)						
17	April 20	@ Orioles	6–5	**Berríos** (3–1)	Yacabonis (1–1)	**Rogers** (2)	—	10–7	W1
18	April 20	@ Orioles	16–7	**Pérez** (2–0)	Cobb (0–1)	—	28,409	11–7	W2
19	April 21	@ Orioles	4–3	**Gibson** (1–0)	Bundy (0–3)	**Rogers** (3)	11,018	12–7	W3
20	April 22	@ Astros	9–5	**Odorizzi** (2–2)	Peacock (2–1)	—	34,518	13–7	W4
21	April 23	@ Astros	4–10	Rondón (2–0)	**Hildenberger** (2–1)	—	29,409	13–8	L1
22	April 24	@ Astros	1–7	Verlander (2–0)	**Stewart** (0–1)	—	26,582	13–9	L2
23	April 26	Orioles	6–1	**Pérez** (3–0)	Cobb (0–2)	—	23,658	14–9	W1
24	April 27	Orioles	9–2	**Berríos** (4–1)	Fry (0–1)	—	18,878	15–9	W2
25	April 28	Orioles	4–1	**Gibson** (2–0)	Bundy (0–4)	**Parker** (5)	20,034	16–9	W3
26	April 29	Astros	1–0	**Odorizzi** (3–2)	Verlander (4–1)	**Parker** (6)	12,615	17–9	W4
27	April 30	Astros	0–11	Cole (2–4)	**Pineda** (2–2)	—	12,181	17–10	L1

May: 21–8 (Home: 10–4; Away: 11–4)

#	Date	Opponent	Score	Win	Loss	Save	Attendance	Record	Streak
28	May 1	Astros	6–2	**Pérez** (4–0)	McHugh (3–3)	—	14,115	18–10	W1
29	May 2	Astros	8–2	**Berríos** (5–1)	Peacock (2–2)	—	17,271	19–10	W2
30	May 3	@ Yankees	3–6	Holder (2–0)	**Gibson** (2–1)	Chapman (6)	35,911	19–11	L1
31	May 4	@ Yankees	7–3	**Odorizzi** (4–2)	Happ (1–3)	—	43,123	20–11	W1
32	May 5	@ Yankees	1–4 (8)	Germán (6–1)	**Pineda** (2–3)	Chapman (7)	38,603	20–12	L1
33	May 6	@ Blue Jays	8–0	**Pérez** (5–0)	Stroman (1–5)	–	12,292	21–12	W1
34	May 7	@ Blue Jays	3–0	**Berríos** (6–1)	Sanchez (3–3)	**Rogers** (4)	14,039	22–12	W2
35	May 8	@ Blue Jays	9–1	**Gibson** (3–1)	Thornton (0–4)	—	14,372	23–12	W3
36	May 10	Tigers	6–0	**Odorizzi** (5–2)	Ross (1–5)	—	26,789	24–12	W4
37	May 11	Tigers	3–5	Jiménez (2–1)	**Hildenberger** (2–2)	Greene (14)	28,840	24–13	L1
38	May 11	Tigers	8–3	**Stewart** (1–1)	Soto (0–1)		20,724	25–13	W1
39	May 12	Tigers	3–5	Norris (2–1)	**Pérez** (5–1)	Greene (15)	27,373	25–14	L1
40	May 13	Angels	4–5	Skaggs (4–3)	**Berríos** (6–2)	Robles (4)	21,359	25–15	L2
41	May 14	Angels	4–3	**Gibson** (4–1)	Bedrosian (1–2)	**Parker** (7)	26,747	26–15	W1
42	May 15	Angels	8–7	**Odorizzi** (6–2)	Cahill (2–4)	**Morin** (1)	31,919	27–15	W2
43	May 16	@ Mariners	11–6	**Pineda** (3–3)	Swanson (1–5)	—	16,397	28–15	W3
44	May 17	@ Mariners	7–1	**Pérez** (6–1)	Gonzales (5–3)	—	20,268	29–15	W4
45	May 18	@ Mariners	18–4	**Duffey** (1–0)	LeBlanc (2–1)	—	34,433	30–15	W5
46	May 19	@ Mariners	4–7	Kikuchi (3–1)	**Gibson** (4–2)	—	31,068	30–16	L1
47	May 20	@ Angels	3–1	**Rogers** (1–0)	Buttrey (2–2)	**Parker** (8)	34,177	31–16	W1
48	May 21	@ Angels	8–3	**Pineda** (4–3)	Bard (1–2)	—	32,316	32–16	W2
49	May 22	@ Angels	–	**Postponed (rain)** (Makeup date: May 23.)					
49	May 23	@ Angels	16–7	**Pérez** (7–1)	Harvey (2–4)	—	30,992	33–16	W3
50	May 24	White Sox	11–4	**Berríos** (7–2)	López (3–5)	—	29,638	34–16	W4
51	May 25	White Sox	8–1	**Gibson** (5–2)	Bañuelos (2–4)	—	39,139	35–16	W5
52	May 26	White Sox	7–0	**Odorizzi** (7–2)	Covey (0–4)	—	39,913	36–16	W6
53	May 27	Brewers	4–5	Burnes (1–3)	**Rogers** (1–1)	Hader (13)	29,167	36–17	L1
54	May 28	Brewers	5–3	**Magill** (1–0)	Claudio (1–2)	**Harper** (1)	27,120	37–17	W1
55	May 30	@ Rays	3–14	Morton (6–0)	**Pérez** (7–2)	—	8,076	37–18	L1
56	May 31	@ Rays	5–3	**Rogers** (2–1)	Castillo (1–4)	—	14,375	38–18	W1

June: 15–12 (Home: 7–5; Away: 8–7)

#	Date	Opponent	Score	Win	Loss	Save	Attendance	Record	Streak
57	June 1	@ Rays	6–2	**Gibson** (6–2)	Chirinos (6–2)	—	14,381	39–18	W2
58	June 2	@ Rays	9–7	**Odorizzi** (8–2)	Yarbrough (4–2)	**Rogers** (5)	14,616	40–18	W3
59	June 4	@ Indians	2–5	Bieber (5–2)	**Smeltzer** (0–1)	Hand (17)	15,814	40–19	L1
60	June 5	@ Indians	7–9	Wittgren (3–0)	**Parker** (0–2)	Hand (18)	16,962	40–20	L2
61	June 6	@ Indians	5–4	**Berríos** (8–2)	Bauer (4–6)	**Rogers** (6)	15,350	41–20	W1
62	June 7	@ Tigers	6–3	**Harper** (1–0)	Jiménez (2–4)	**Parker** (9)	21,551	42–20	W2
63	June 8	@ Tigers	3–9	Ramirez (2–0)	**Gibson** (6–3)	—	26,818	42–21	L1
64	June 9	@ Tigers	12–2	**Odorizzi** (9–2)	Carpenter (1–3)	—	20,127	43–21	W1
65	June 11	Mariners	6–5	**Magill** (2–0)	Brennan (2–5)	**May** (1)	23,046	44–21	W2
66	June 12	Mariners	6–9 (10)	Bass (1–1)	**Duffey** (1–1)	Elías (6)	25,909	44–22	L1
67	June 13	Mariners	10–5	**Harper** (2–0)	Brennan (2–6)	—	31,912	45–22	W1
68	June 14	Royals	2–0	**Gibson** (7–3)	Diekman (0–4)	**Rogers** (7)	38,898	46–22	W2
69	June 15	Royals	5–4	**Odorizzi** (10–2)	Sparkman (1–3)	**Rogers** (8)	39,267	47–22	W3
70	June 16	Royals	6–8	López (1–6)	**Pérez** (7–3)	Kennedy (7)	38,886	47–23	L1
71	June 17	Red Sox	0–2	Porcello (5–6)	**Berríos** (8–3)	Brasier (7)	27,970	47–24	L2
72	June 18	Red Sox	4–3 (17)	**Littell** (1–0)	Johnson (0–1)	—	25,741	48–24	W1
73	June 19	Red Sox	4–9	Rodríguez (8–4)	**Gibson** (7–4)	—	31,835	48–25	L1
74	June 20	@ Royals	1–4	Sparkman (2–3)	**Odorizzi** (10–3)	Kennedy (9)	22,683	48–26	L2
75	June 21	@ Royals	8–7	**Harper** (3–0)	Diekman (0–5)	**Rogers** (9)	27,418	49–26	W1
76	June 22	@ Royals	5–3 (10)	**May** (2–1)	Peralta (2–3)	**Parker** (10)	28,504	50–26	W2
77	June 23	@ Royals	1–6	Bailey (7–6)	**Pineda** (4–4)	McCarthy (1)	21,257	50–27	L1
78	June 25	Rays	9–4	**Gibson** (8–4)	Snell (4–7)	—	31,963	51–27	W1
79	June 26	Rays	6–4	**May** (3–1)	Morton (8–2)	**Rogers** (10)	31,650	52–27	W2
80	June 27	Rays	2–5 (18)	Yarbrough (7–3)	**Harper** (3–1)	—	31,317	52–28	L1
81	June 28	@ White Sox	4–6	Detwiler (1–0)	**Berríos** (8–4)	Colomé (17)	28,218	52–29	L2
82	June 29	@ White Sox	10–3	**Pineda** (5–4)	Nova (3–7)	—	27,908	53–29	W1
83	June 30	@ White Sox	3–4	Giolito (11–2)	**Thorpe** (0–1)	Álex Colomé (18)	27,244	53–30	L1

July: 13–11 (Home: 5–7; Away: 8–4)

#	Date	Opponent	Score	Win	Loss	Save	Attendance	Record	Streak
84	July 2	@ A's	6–8	Mengden (3–1)	**Odorizzi** (10–4)	Hendriks (3)	13,926	53–31	L2
85	July 3	@ A's	4–3 (12)	**Parker** (1–2)	Treinen (2–3)	**Rogers** (11)	31,570	54–31	W1
86	July 4	@ A's	2–7	Wang (1–0)	**Berríos** (8–5)	—	20,836	54–32	L1
87	July 5	Rangers	15–6	**Pérez** (8–3)	Sampson (6–6)	—	38,073	55–32	W1
88	July 6	Rangers	7–4	**Pineda** (6–4)	Chavez (3–4)	**Rogers** (12)	36,969	56–32	W2
89	July 7	Rangers	1–4 (11)	Kelley (4–2)	**Mejía** (0–2)	—	35,495	56–33	L1
-	July 9	**90th All-Star Game in Cleveland, OH**							
90	July 12	@ Indians	5–3	**Littell** (2–0)	Pérez (2–2)	**Rogers** (13)	30,857	57–33	W1
91	July 13	@ Indians	6–2	**Odorizzi** (11–4)	Bauer (8–7)	—	32,277	58–33	W2
92	July 14	@ Indians	3–4	Cimber (5–2)	**May** (3–2)	Hand (24)	25,194	58–34	L1
93	July 16	Mets	2–3	Avilán (2–0)	**Pineda** (6–5)	Díaz (21)	28,712	58–35	L2
94	July 17	Mets	4–14	Vargas (4–5)	**May** (3–3)	—	35,124	58–36	L3
95	July 18	A's	6–3	**Gibson** (9–4)	Petit (2–2)	**Rogers** (14)	28,432	59–36	W1
96	July 19	A's	3–5	Bassitt (7–4)	**Harper** (3–2)	Hendriks (7)	31,082	59–37	L1
97	July 20	A's	4–5	Treinen (3–3)	**Rogers** (2–2)	Hendriks (8)	32,270	59–38	L2
98	July 21	A's	7–6	**Stewart** (2–1)	Hendriks (4–1)	—	34,070	60–38	W1
99	July 22	Yankees	8–6	**Thorpe** (1–1)	Sabathia (5–5)	**Rogers** (15)	34,627	61–38	W2
100	July 23	Yankees	12–14 (10)	Chapman (3–2)	**Stewart** (2–2)	Green (1)	32,470	61–39	L1
101	July 24	Yankees	7–10	Cortes Jr. (4–0)	**Odorizzi** (11–5)	Chapman (26)	40,127	61–40	L2
102	July 25	@ White Sox	10–3	**Berríos** (9–5)	Giolito (11–5)	—	22,087	62–40	W1
103	July 26	@ White Sox	6–2	**Pineda** (7–5)	Cease (1–3)	—	22,602	63–40	W2
104	July 27	@ White Sox	1–5	Nova (6–9)	**Pérez** (8–4)	—	34,085	63–41	L1
105	July 28	@ White Sox	11–1	**Gibson** (10–4)	Covey (1–7)	—	27,595	64–41	W1
106	July 30	@ Marlins	2–1	**Odorizzi** (12–5)	Gallen (1–3)	**Rogers** (16)	8,064	65–41	W2
107	July 31	@ Marlins	7–1	**Berríos** (10–5)	Alcántara (4–10)	—	8,567	66–41	W3

August: 17–11 (Home: 8–8; Away: 9–3)

#	Date	Opponent	Score	Win	Loss	Save	Attendance	Record	Streak
108	August 1	@ Marlins	4–5 (12)	Brigham (1–0)	**Stashak** (0–1)	—	10,390	66–42	L1
109	August 2	Royals	11–9	**May** (4–3)	Lovelady (0–1)	**Romo** (18)	32,341	67–42	W1
110	August 3	Royals	11–3	**Gibson** (11–4)	Duffy (5–6)	—	36,823	68–42	W2
111	August 4	Royals	3–0	**Smeltzer** (1–1)	Keller (7–11)	**Rogers** (17)	30,171	69–42	W3
112	August 5	Braves	5–3	**May** (5–3)	Martin (0–3)	—	26,722	70–42	W4
113	August 6	Braves	7–12	Foltynewicz (3–5)	**Berríos** (10–6)	—	36,721	70–43	L1
114	August 7	Braves	7–11	Fried (13–4)	**Perez** (8–5)	—	35,682	70–44	L2
115	August 8	Indians	5–7	Clevinger (7–2)	**Gibson** (11–5)	Hand (29)	32,517	70–45	L3
116	August 9	Indians	2–6	Bieber (12–4)	**Smeltzer** (1–2)	—	36,641	70–46	L4
117	August 10	Indians	4–1	**Odorizzi** (13–5)	Plutko (4–3)	**Rogers** (18)	35,268	71–46	W1
118	August 11	Indians	3–7 (10)	Hand (5–3)	**Rogers** (2–3)	—	37,849	71–47	L1
119	August 13	@ Brewers	7–5	**Duffey** (2–1)	Pomeranz (2–10)	**Romo** (19)	44,331	72–47	W1
120	August 14	@ Brewers	5–6	Guerra (6–3)	**Romo** (2–1)	Albers (4)	41,077	72–48	L1
121	August 15	@ Rangers	13–6	**Pineda** (8–5)	Payano (1–2)	**Smeltzer** (1)	20,494	73–48	W1
122	August 16	@ Rangers	4–3	**Duffey** (3–1)	Minor (11–7)	**Romo** (20)	24,742	74–48	W2
123	August 17	@ Rangers	12–7	**Duffey** (4–1)	Jurado (6–9)	—	30,136	75–48	W3
124	August 18	@ Rangers	6–3	**Dyson** (5–1)	Clase (0–2)	**Rogers** (19)	18,500	76–48	W4
125	August 19	White Sox	4–6	Nova (9–9)	**Gibson** (11–6)	Colomé (24)	25,564	76–49	L1
126	August 20	White Sox	14–4	**Pineda** (9–5)	López (7–11)	—	26,798	77–49	W1
127	August 21	White Sox	0–4	Giolito (14–6)	**Odorizzi** (13–6)	—	31,389	77–50	L1
128	August 23	Tigers	6–9	VerHagen (4–2)	**Berríos** (10–7)	—	31,238	77–51	L2
129	August 24	Tigers	8–5	**Gibson** (12–6)	Jackson (3–7)	**Rogers** (20)	39,429	78–51	W1
130	August 25	Tigers	7–4	**Pérez** (9–5)	Boyd (6–10)	—	32,892	79–51	W2
131	August 27	@ White Sox	3–1	**Pineda** (10–5)	Giolito (14–7)	**Rogers** (21)	12,175	80–51	W3
132	August 28	@ White Sox	8–2	**Odorizzi** (14–6)	Detwiler (2–4)	—	16,802	81–51	W4
133	August 29	@ White Sox	10–5	**Berríos** (11–7)	Cease (3–7)	**Dobnak** (1)	15,886	82–51	W5
134	August 30	@ Tigers	13–5	**Gibson** (13–6)	Jackson (3–8)	—	17,273	83–51	W6
135	August 31	@ Tigers	7–10	Boyd (7–10)	**Pérez** (9–6)	—	16,713	83–52	L1

September: 18–9 (Home: 7–6; Away: 11–3)

#	Date	Opponent	Score	Win	Loss	Save	Attendance	Record	
136	September 1	@ Tigers	8–3	**Pineda** (11–5)	Turnbull (3–14)	—	13,776	84–52	W1
137	September 2	@ Tigers	4–3	**Littell** (3–0)	Farmer (5–6)	**Rogers** (22)	14,614	85–52	W2
138	September 3	@ Red Sox	6–5	**Thorpe** (2–1)	Porcello (12–11)	**Rogers** (23)	35,429	86–52	W3
139	September 4	@ Red Sox	2–6	Rodriguez (17–5)	**Berríos** (11–8)	Workman (11)	35,218	86–53	L1
140	September 5	@ Red Sox	2–1	**Pérez** (10–6)	Cashner (11–8)	**Rogers** (24)	32,632	87–53	W1
141	September 6	Indians	2–6 (11)	Clippard (1–0)	**Thorpe** (2–2)	—	35,418	87–54	L1
142	September 7	Indians	5–3	**Littell** (4–0)	Cimber (5–3)	**Rogers** (25)	39,573	88–54	W1
143	September 8	Indians	2–5	Clevinger (11–2)	**Dobnak** (0–1)	Hand (34)	31,380	88–55	L1
144	September 10	Nationals	5–0	**Berríos** (12–8)	Sánchez (8–8)	—	24,813	89–55	W1
145	September 11	Nationals	2–6	Strasburg (17–6)	**Pérez** (10–7)	—	20,062	89–56	L1
146	September 12	Nationals	6–12	Corbin (12–7)	**Gibson** (13–7)	—	19,167	89–57	L2
—	September 13	@ Indians	–	**Postponed (rain)** (Makeup date: September 14.)					
147	September 14	@ Indians	2–0	**Littell** (5–0)	Clevinger (11–3)	**Rogers** (26)	24,258	90–57	W1
148	September 14	@ Indians	9–5	**Graterol** (1–0)	Pérez (2–3)	—	31,841	91–57	W2
149	September 15	@ Indians	5–7	Wittgren (5–1)	**Romero** (0–1)	Pérez (1)	26,414	91–58	L1
150	September 16	White Sox	5–3	**Berríos** (13–8)	López (9–14)	**Rogers** (27)	21,850	92–58	W1
151	September 17	White Sox	9–8 (12)	**Harper** (4–2)	Ruiz (1–4)	—	22,518	93–58	W2
152	September 18	White Sox	1–3	Fry (3–4)	**Odorizzi** (14–7)	Colomé (28)	23,759	93–59	L1
153	September 19	Royals	8–5	**Thorpe** (3–2)	Barnes (1–3)	**Rogers** (28)	24,565	94–59	W1
154	September 20	Royals	4–3	**Dobnak** (1–1)	Skoglund (0–2)	**May** (2)	29,468	95–59	W2
155	September 21	Royals	5–12	Rosario (2–0)	**Rogers** (2–4)	—	37,750	95–60	L1
156	September 22	Royals	12–8	**Littell** (6–0)	López (4–9)	—	31,628	96–60	W1
157	September 24	@ Tigers	4–2	**Odorizzi** (15–7)	Turnbull (3–16)	**Rogers** (29)	16,174	97–60	W2
158	September 25	@ Tigers	5–1	**Dobnak** (2–1)	VerHagen (4–3)	—	16,242	98–60	W3
159	September 26	@ Tigers	10–4	**Smeltzer** (2–2)	Zimmermann (1–13)	—	17,557	99–60	W4
160	September 27	@ Royals	6–2 (7)	**Berríos** (14–8)	Skoglund (0–3)	—	15,389	100–60	W5
161	September 28	@ Royals	4–3	**Duffey** (5–1)	Barnes (1–5)	**Rogers** (30)	21,995	101–60	W6
162	September 29	@ Royals	4–5	Kennedy (3–2)	**Graterol** (1–1)	—	17,875	101-61	L1

Legend: = Win = Loss = Postponement
Bold = Twins Team Member

== Player stats ==
=== Batting ===
Note: G = Games played; AB = At bats; R = Runs; H = Hits; 2B = Doubles; 3B = Triples; HR = Home runs; RBI = Runs batted in; SB = Stolen bases; BB = Walks; AVG = Batting average; SLG = Slugging average

Player	G	AB	R	H	2B	3B	HR	RBI	SB	BB	AVG	SLG
Jorge Polanco	153	631	107	186	40	7	22	79	4	60	.295	.485
Eddie Rosario	137	562	91	155	28	1	32	109	3	22	.276	.500
Max Kepler	134	524	98	132	32	0	36	90	1	60	.252	.519
C. J. Cron	125	458	51	116	24	0	25	78	0	29	.253	.469
Nelson Cruz	120	454	81	141	26	0	41	108	0	56	.311	.639
Jonathan Schoop	121	433	61	111	23	1	23	59	1	20	.256	.473
Marwin González	114	425	52	112	19	0	15	55	1	31	.264	.414
Miguel Sanó	105	380	76	94	19	2	34	79	0	55	.247	.576
Luis Arráez	92	326	54	109	20	1	4	28	2	36	.334	.439
Mitch Garver	93	311	70	85	16	1	31	67	0	41	.273	.630
Byron Buxton	87	271	48	71	30	4	10	46	14	19	.262	.513
Jason Castro	79	237	39	55	9	0	13	30	0	33	.232	.435
Ehire Adrianza	83	202	34	55	8	3	5	22	0	20	.272	.416
Jake Cave	72	198	28	51	11	2	8	25	0	21	.258	.455
Willians Astudillo	58	190	28	51	9	0	4	21	0	5	.268	.379
LaMonte Wade Jr.	26	56	10	11	2	1	2	5	0	11	.196	.375
Ryan LaMarre	14	23	3	5	0	0	2	3	1	3	.217	.478
Ian Miller	12	17	2	3	1	0	0	1	0	0	.176	.235
Ronald Torreyes	7	16	3	3	0	0	0	1	1	0	.188	.188
Tyler Austin	2	4	1	1	1	0	0	0	0	1	.250	.500
Pitcher totals	162	14	2	0	0	0	0	0	0	2	.000	.000
Team totals	162	5732	939	1547	318	23	307	906	28	525	.270	.494

=== Pitching ===
Note: W = Wins; L = Losses; ERA = Earned run average; G = Games pitched; GS = Games started; SV = Saves; IP = Innings pitched; H = Hits allowed; R = Runs allowed; ER = Earned runs allowed; BB = Walks allowed; SO = Strikeouts

Player	W	L	ERA	G	GS	SV	IP	H	R	ER	BB	SO
José Berríos	14	8	3.68	32	32	0	200.1	194	94	82	51	195
Martín Pérez	10	7	5.12	32	29	0	165.1	184	104	94	67	135
Kyle Gibson	13	7	4.84	34	29	0	160.0	175	99	86	56	160
Jake Odorizzi	15	7	3.51	30	30	0	159.0	139	65	62	53	178
Michael Pineda	11	5	4.01	26	26	0	146.0	141	68	65	28	140
Taylor Rogers	2	4	2.61	60	0	30	69.0	58	20	20	11	90
Trevor May	5	3	2.94	65	0	2	64.1	43	24	21	26	79
Tyler Duffey	5	1	2.50	58	0	0	57.2	44	23	16	14	82
Ryne Harper	4	2	3.81	61	0	1	54.1	54	25	23	10	50
Devin Smeltzer	2	2	3.86	11	6	1	49.0	50	23	21	12	38
Zack Littell	6	0	2.68	29	0	0	37.0	34	12	11	9	32
Blake Parker	1	2	4.21	37	0	10	36.1	34	18	17	16	34
Randy Dobnak	2	1	1.59	9	5	1	28.1	27	9	5	5	23
Matt Magill	2	0	4.45	28	0	0	28.1	30	21	14	15	36
Lewis Thorpe	3	2	6.18	12	2	0	27.2	38	19	19	10	31
Kohl Stewart	2	2	6.39	9	2	0	25.1	29	18	18	8	10
Cody Stashak	0	1	3.24	18	1	0	25.0	29	9	9	1	25
Sergio Romo	0	1	3.18	27	0	3	22.2	17	9	8	4	27
Mike Morin	0	0	3.18	23	0	1	22.2	20	11	8	2	11
Trevor Hildenberger	2	2	10.47	22	0	1	16.1	30	19	19	7	15
Adalberto Mejía	0	2	8.80	13	0	0	15.1	16	16	15	12	15
Fernando Romero	0	1	7.07	15	0	0	14.0	19	12	11	11	18
Sam Dyson	1	0	7.15	12	0	0	11.1	14	9	9	6	8
Brusdar Graterol	1	1	4.66	10	0	0	9.2	10	5	5	2	10
Sean Poppen	0	0	7.56	4	0	0	8.1	10	7	7	5	9
Ryan Eades	0	0	0.00	2	0	0	3.2	4	0	0	2	5
Austin Adams	0	0	16.88	2	0	0	2.2	4	5	5	3	5
Jorge Alcalá	0	0	0.00	2	0	0	1.2	1	0	0	1	1
Ehire Adrianza	0	0	27.00	1	0	0	1.0	5	3	3	0	1
Chase De Jong	0	0	36.00	1	0	0	1.0	3	4	4	3	0
Andrew Vasquez	0	0	inf	1	0	0	0.0	0	3	3	2	0
Team totals	101	61	4.18	162	162	50	1463.1	1456	754	680	452	1463

== Postseason ==
=== Game log ===
2019 Postseason: 0–3 (Home 0–1; Away 0–2)
American League Division Series: 0−3 (Home 0–1; Away 0–2)

#	Date	Opponent	Score	Win	Loss	Save	Attendance	Record	Streak
1	October 4	@ Yankees	4–10	Green (1–0)	Littell (0–1)	—	49,233	0–1	L1
2	October 5	@ Yankees	2–8	Tanaka (1–0)	Dobnak (0–1)	—	49,277	0–2	L2
3	October 7	Yankees	1–5	Green (2–0)	Odorizzi (0–1)	Chapman (1)	41,121	0–3	L3

=== Postseason rosters ===
Playoff rosters
American League Division Series

- Pitchers: 12 Jake Odorizzi 17 José Berríos 21 Tyler Duffey 31 Devin Smeltzer 44 Kyle Gibson 51 Brusdar Graterol 52 Zack Littell 54 Sergio Romo 55 Taylor Rogers 61 Cody Stashak 65 Trevor May 68 Randy Dobnak
- Catchers: 15 Jason Castro 18 Mitch Garver
- Infielders: 2 Luis Arráez 9 Marwin González 11 Jorge Polanco 13 Ehire Adrianza 16 Jonathan Schoop 22 Miguel Sanó 24 C. J. Cron
- Outfielders: 20 Eddie Rosario 26 Max Kepler 60 Jake Cave
- Designated hitters: 23 Nelson Cruz

=== Season standings ===
AL Central
Team	W	L	Pct.	GB	Home	Road
Minnesota Twins	101	61	.623	—	46‍–‍35	55‍–‍26
Cleveland Indians	93	69	.574	8	49‍–‍32	44‍–‍37
Chicago White Sox	72	89	.447	28½	39‍–‍41	33‍–‍48
Kansas City Royals	59	103	.364	42	31‍–‍50	28‍–‍53
Detroit Tigers	47	114	.292	53½	22‍–‍59	25‍–‍55

Division leaders
Team	W	L	Pct.
Houston Astros	107	55	.660
New York Yankees	103	59	.636
Minnesota Twins	101	61	.623

Wild Card teams (Top 2 teams qualify for postseason)
Team	W	L	Pct.	GB
Oakland Athletics	97	65	.599	+1
Tampa Bay Rays	96	66	.593	—
Cleveland Indians	93	69	.574	3
Boston Red Sox	84	78	.519	12
Texas Rangers	78	84	.481	18
Chicago White Sox	72	89	.447	23½
Los Angeles Angels	72	90	.444	24
Seattle Mariners	68	94	.420	28
Toronto Blue Jays	67	95	.414	29
Kansas City Royals	59	103	.364	37
Baltimore Orioles	54	108	.333	42
Detroit Tigers	47	114	.292	48½

=== Records vs. AL opponents ===
2019 American League record Source: MLB Standings Grid – 2019
Team	BAL	BOS	CWS	CLE	DET	HOU	KC	LAA	MIN	NYY	OAK	SEA	TB	TEX	TOR	NL
Baltimore	—	7–12	3–3	3–4	3–4	2–4	3–3	4–3	0–6	2–17	1–6	3–4	7–12	1–6	8–11	7–13
Boston	12–7	—	5–2	3–3	5–2	2–4	5–1	4–3	3–3	5–14	4–3	4–3	7–12	4–3	11–8	10–10
Chicago	3–3	2–5	—	11–8	12–6	4–3	9–10	2–5	6–13	4–3	1–5	2–4	2–4	4–3	4–3	6–14
Cleveland	4–3	3–3	8–11	—	18–1	3–4	12–7	6–0	10–9	4–3	1–5	5–1	1–6	4–3	6–1	8–12
Detroit	4–3	2–5	6–12	1–18	—	1–6	10–9	3–3	5–14	3–3	1–6	1–6	2–4	0–6	3–4	5–15
Houston	4–2	4–2	3–4	4–3	6–1	—	5–1	14–5	3–4	4–3	11–8	18–1	3–4	13–6	4–2	11–9
Kansas City	3–3	1–5	10–9	7–12	9–10	1–5	—	2–4	5–14	2–5	2–5	2–5	3–4	2–5	1–6	9–11
Los Angeles	3–4	3–4	5–2	0–6	3–3	5–14	4–2	—	1–5	2–5	6–13	10–9	3–4	9–10	6–1	12–8
Minnesota	6–0	3–3	13–6	9–10	14–5	4–3	14–5	5–1	—	2–4	3–4	5–2	5–2	6–1	4–3	8–12
New York	17–2	14–5	3–4	3–4	3–3	3–4	5–2	5–2	4–2	—	2–4	6–1	12–7	3–3	11–8	12–8
Oakland	6–1	3–4	5–1	5–1	6–1	8–11	5–2	13–6	4–3	4–2	—	10–9	4–3	13–6	0–6	11–9
Seattle	4–3	3–4	4–2	1–5	6–1	1–18	5–2	9–10	2–5	1–6	9–10	—	2–4	8–11	4–2	9–11
Tampa Bay	12–7	12–7	4–2	6–1	4–2	4–3	4–3	4–3	2–5	7–12	3–4	4–2	—	3–3	13–6	14–6
Texas	6–1	3–4	3–4	3–4	6–0	6–13	5–2	10–9	1–6	3–3	6–13	11–8	3–3	—	3–3	9–11
Toronto	11–8	8–11	3–4	1–6	4–3	2–4	6–1	1–6	3–4	8–11	6–0	2–4	6–13	3–3	—	3–17

== Roster ==
2019 Minnesota Twins
Roster
Pitchers: 31 Austin Adams; 66 Jorge Alcalá; 17 José Berríos; 61 Chase De Jong; 68 Randy Dobnak; 21 Tyler Duffey; 49 Sam Dyson; 80 Ryan Eades; 44 Kyle Gibson; 51 Brusdar Graterol; 19 Ryne Harper; 39 Trevor Hildenberger; 52 Zack Littell; 68 Matt Magill; 65 Trevor May; 49 Adalberto Mejía; 51 Mike Morin; 12 Jake Odorizzi; 38 Blake Parker; 33 Martín Pérez; 35 Michael Pineda; 71 Sean Poppen; 55 Taylor Rogers; 77 Fernando Romero; 54 Sergio Romo; 31 Devin Smeltzer; 61 Cody Stashak; 53 Kohl Stewart; 43 Lewis Thorpe; 62 Andrew Vasquez	Catchers: 15 Jason Castro; 18 Mitch Garver; Infielders: 13 Ehire Adrianza; 2 Luis Arráez; 64 Willians Astudillo; 31 Tyler Austin; 24 C. J. Cron; 9 Marwin González; 11 Jorge Polanco; 22 Miguel Sanó; 16 Jonathan Schoop; 74 Ronald Torreyes	Outfielders: 25 Byron Buxton; 60 Jake Cave; 26 Max Kepler; 27 Ryan LaMarre; 41 Ian Miller; 20 Eddie Rosario; 30 LaMonte Wade Jr.; Other batters: 23 Nelson Cruz	Manager: 5 Rocco Baldelli; Coaches: 46 Tony Diaz (third base); 67 Bill Evers (catching); 45 Jeremy Hefner (assistant pitching); 63 Rudy Hernandez (assistant hitting); 47 Wes Johnson (pitching); 97 Garrett Kennedy (bullpen catcher); 98 Connor Olson (bullpen catcher); 82 James Rowson (hitting); 8 Derek Shelton (bench); 40 Tommy Watkins (first base)

Lineup	Avg	Hr	Hits	Rbi
Max Kepler	.252	36	132	90
Jorge Polanco	.295	22	186	79
Nelson Cruz	.311	41	141	108
Eddie Rosario	.276	32	155	109
C.J. Cron	.253	25	116	78
Marwin González	.264	15	112	55
Jonathan Schoop	.256	23	111	59
Jason Castro	.232	13	55	30
Byron Buxton	.262	10	71	46

== Farm system ==
Level	Team	League	Manager
AAA	Rochester Red Wings	International League	Joel Skinner
AA	Wichita Wind Surge	Southern League	Ramon Borrego
A-Advanced	Cedar Rapids Kernels	Midwest League	Brian Dinkelman
A	Fort Myers Mighty Mussels	Florida State League	Brian Meyer
Rookie	Elizabethton Twins	Appalachian League	Ray Smith
Rookie	GCL Twins	Gulf Coast League	Robbie Robinson
Rookie	DSL Twins	Dominican Summer League	Seth Feldman
