= Alejandro Mejía =

Dominican baseball player (born 1993)

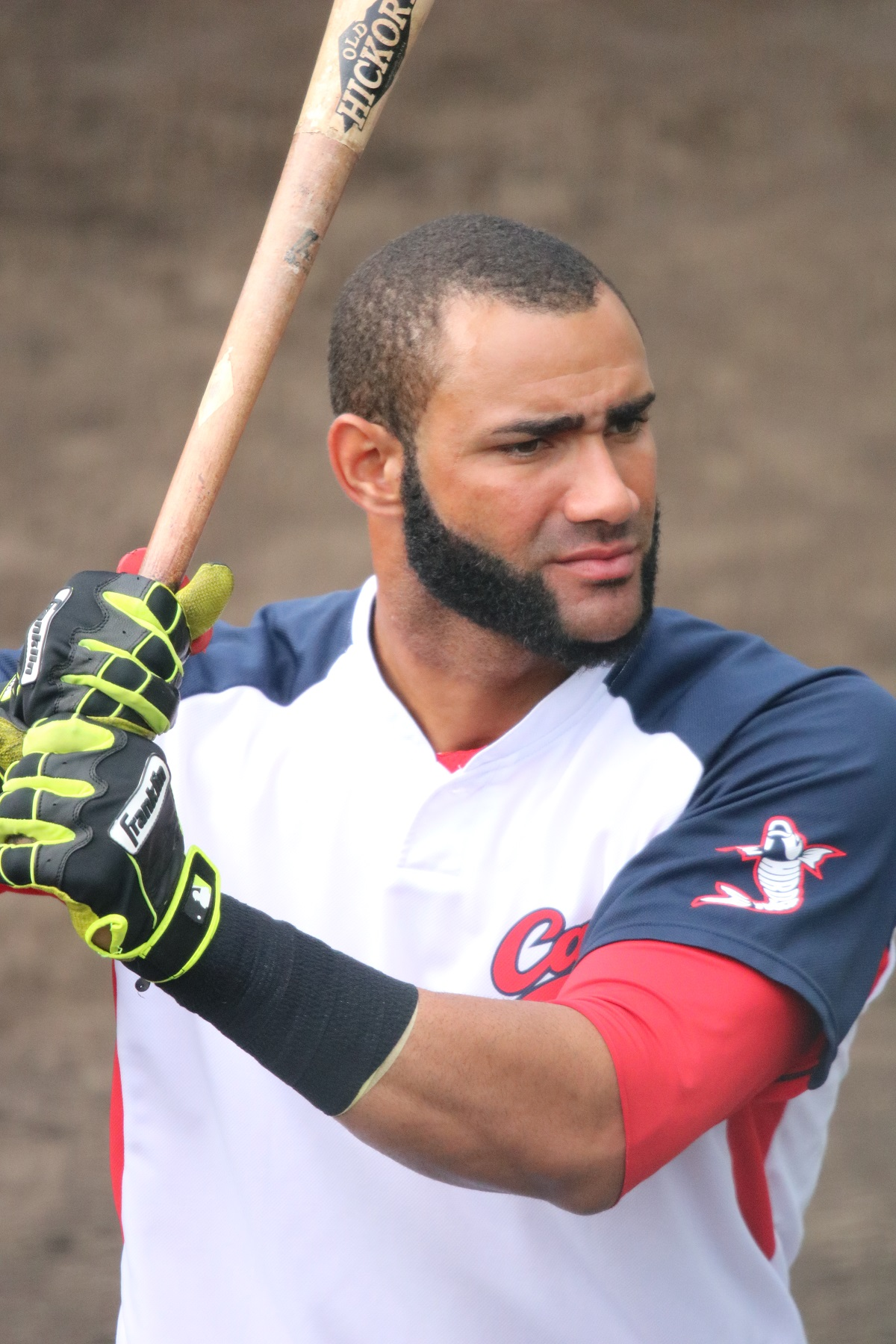
- Mejia with the Hiroshima Toyo Carp

Free agent
- Infielder
- Born: March 10, 1993 (age 33); Santo Domingo, Dominican Republic
- Bats: Right Throws: Right

NPB debut
- August 19, 2017, for the Hiroshima Toyo Carp

NPB statistics (through 2021 season)
- Batting average: .237
- Home runs: 12
- RBI: 29
- Stats at Baseball Reference

Teams
- Hiroshima Toyo Carp (2017–2021)

Alejandro Mejía (born March 10, 1993) is a Dominican professional baseball first baseman and third baseman who is a free agent. He has previously played in Nippon Professional Baseball (NPB) for the Hiroshima Toyo Carp.

== Career ==
=== St. Louis Cardinals ===
On May 28, 2011, Mejía signed with the St. Louis Cardinals organization as an international free agent. He spent the 2011 and 2012 seasons with the DSL Cardinals, slashing .172 in 2011 and .217 in 2012 before being released.

=== Hiroshima Toyo Carp ===
After spending three years out of baseball, Mejía signed with the Hiroshima Toyo Carp of Nippon Professional Baseball. On July 20, 2017, the Carp signed Mejía to a six-year contract. He appeared in 9 games in 2017, notching 3 hits in 14 at-bats. In 2018, he played in 22 games, slashing .268/.318/.537 with 3 home runs and 7 RBI. In 2019, he posted a batting line of .259/.306/.426 with 7 home runs and 17 RBI in 56 games. Mejía hit .188/.235/.288 with 2 home runs and 4 RBI in 37 games for the Carp in 2020. He became a free agent following the 2021 season.

=== Pericos de Puebla ===
On March 18, 2022, Mejía signed with the Pericos de Puebla of the Mexican League. In 71 games, he batted .338/.391/.646 with 22 home runs and 71 RBIs. He returned in 2023, and slashed .309/.367/.491 through 15 games prior to his release on May 9, 2023.

=== Bravos de León ===
On May 13, 2023, Mejía signed with the Bravos de León of the Mexican League. He continued his impressive season, hitting .369/.403/.576 with 13 home runs and 59 RBI. Mejía finished the year as the league leader in hits with 124. He returned in 2024, batting .253/.319/.478 with 11 home runs and 34 RBI over 47 games.

=== Saraperos de Saltillo ===
On June 14, 2024, Mejía and Keven Lamas were traded to the Saraperos de Saltillo of the Mexican League in exchange for Henry Urrutia and Rainel Rosario. In 35 games for Saltillo, he batted .316/.373/.537 with eight home runs and 30 RBI.

Mejía made 27 appearances for Saltillo in 2025, batting .333/.386/.588 with seven home runs and 26 RBI.

=== Dorados de Chihuahua ===
On May 20, 2025, Mejía and Rusber Estrada were traded to the Dorados de Chihuahua of the Mexican League in exchange for Cristian Santana and Lewis Thorpe. In 56 games, he hit .272/.342/.547 with 17 home runs, 59 RBI and three stolen bases.

In 2026, Mejía slashed .269/.336/.546 with nine home runs and 18 RBI across 33 games played.

=== Caliente de Durango ===
On May 25, 2026, Mejía and Devin Smeltzer were traded to Caliente de Durango of the Mexican League in exchange for Andre Lipcius and Elián Leyva. In 43 appearances for the Caliente, he batted .296/.354/.451 with five home runs and 28 RBI. On July 17, Mejía was released by Durango.

=== Bravos de León (second stint) ===
On July 17, 2026, Mejía signed with the Bravos de León of the Mexican League. In 11 appearances for the Bravos, he slashed .306/.359/.722 with four home runs and 13 RBI. On September 24, 2026, Mejía was released by the León.
