= Lewis Thorpe (baseball) =

Australian baseball player (born 1995)

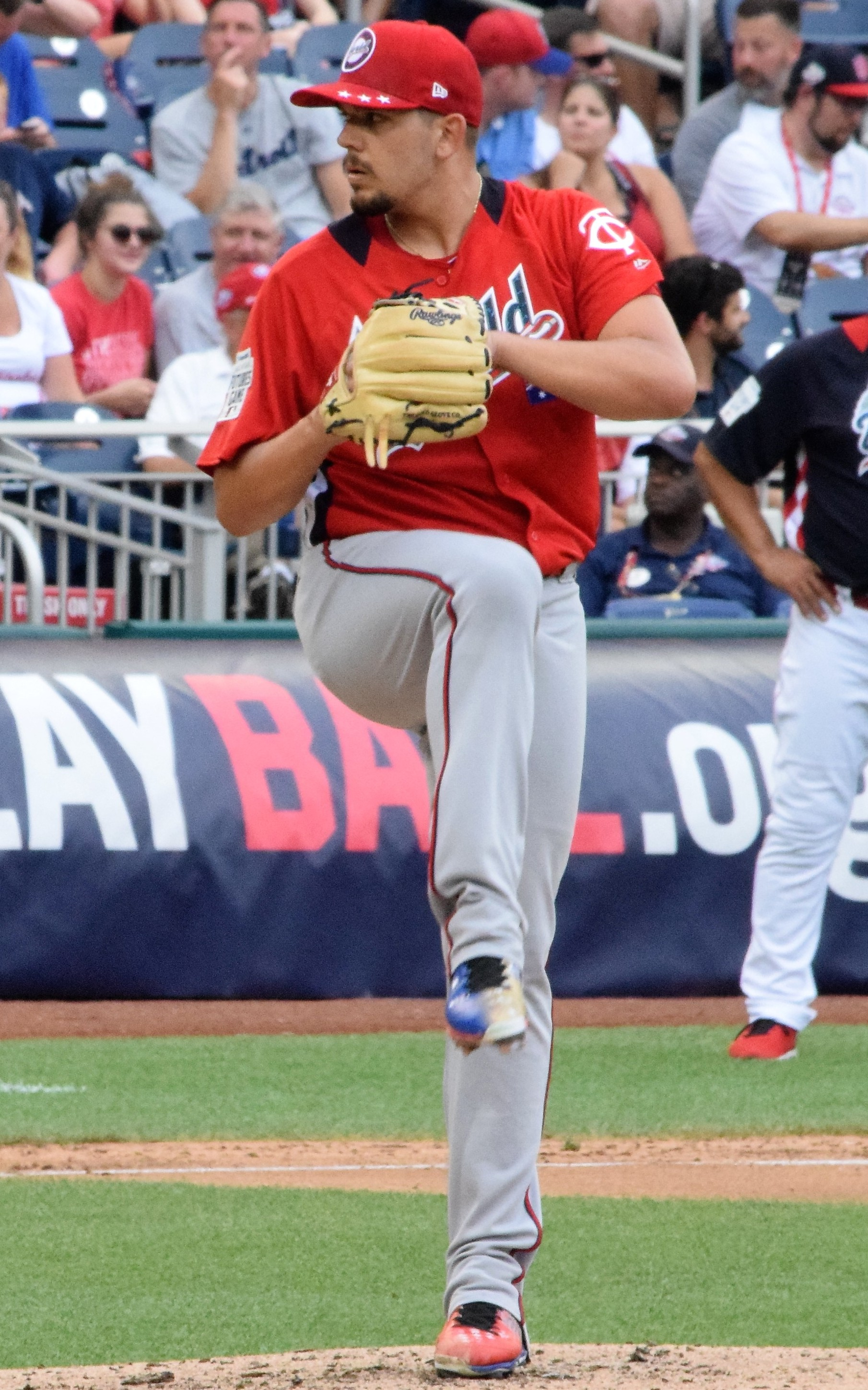
- Thorpe at the 2018 All-Star Futures Game

Free agent
- Pitcher
- Born: 23 November 1995 (age 30); Melbourne, Victoria, Australia
- Bats: Right Throws: Left

MLB debut
- June 30, 2019, for the Minnesota Twins

MLB statistics (through 2021 season)
- Win–loss record: 3–5
- Earned run average: 5.76
- Strikeouts: 47
- Stats at Baseball Reference

Teams
- Minnesota Twins (2019–2021)

Lewis James Thorpe (born 23 November 1995) is an Australian professional baseball pitcher who is a free agent. He has previously played in Major League Baseball (MLB) for the Minnesota Twins.

== Amateur career ==
As an amateur, Thorpe trained at the Melbourne Aces Baseball Academy. He competed in international youth baseball tournaments. In 2011, Thorpe won the "Golden Arm" award from the Australian Baseball Federation. In 2012, he signed with the Minnesota Twins, receiving a $500,000 signing bonus.

== Professional career ==
=== Minnesota Twins ===
In the 2013 season, Thorpe made his professional debut with the Gulf Coast League Twins of the Rookie-level Gulf Coast League (GCL). He pitched to a 4–1 win–loss record and a 2.05 earned run average (ERA) in 44 innings pitched, and a GCL-leading 64 strikeouts. He pitched in the 2013 18U Baseball World Cup after the season for the Australian national baseball team. He pitched Australia to victory against the United States national baseball team, the only game the United States lost. After the season, Baseball America named him the seventh-best prospect in the GCL. Thorpe made his Australian Baseball League debut with the Aces on 22 November 2013.

After participating in extended spring training, the Twins assigned Thorpe to the Cedar Rapids Kernels of the Single-A Midwest League in June 2014, where he became the youngest player in the league. He finished the year with a 3–2 win–loss record and a 3.52 ERA in 16 games started. At the end of the 2014 season, Thorpe was diagnosed with a sprained ulnar collateral ligament (UCL) in his pitching elbow. He underwent Tommy John surgery to repair the injury in March 2015, causing him to miss all of 2015 and 2016. Thorpe returned in 2017 and spent time with both the Fort Myers Miracle of the High-A Florida State League and the Chattanooga Lookouts of the Double-A Southern League, pitching to a combined 4-4 record and 2.93 ERA in 17 total games (16 starts) between the two teams. The Twins added him to their 40-man roster after the season. Thorpe returned to Chattanooga in 2018, and was selected to represent the Twins in the All-Star Futures Game.

On 28 June 2019, the Twins promoted Thorpe to MLB. On 30 June, he made his MLB debut.

On 29 June 2020, Thorpe made the Twins 60-man summer camp roster in 2020. He made the Twins Opening Day roster in 2020. In 2020, Thorpe registered a 6.06 ERA with 10 strikeouts in 16.1 innings pitched. In 2021, Thorpe made 13 total appearances between Minnesota and the Triple-A St. Paul Saints. In 5 appearances for the big league club, logging a 4.70 ERA with 6 strikeouts in 15.1 innings of work.

In spring training in 2022, the Twins transitioned Thorpe to a relief pitcher. On 28 March 2022, the Twins sent Thorpe outright to the St. Paul Saints of the Triple-A International League, removing him from their 40-man roster to make room for the newly-signed Chris Archer. On 21 April 2022, the Twins released Thorpe, making him a free agent.

=== Kansas City Monarchs ===
On 5 May 2022, Thorpe signed with the Kansas City Monarchs of the American Association of Professional Baseball. Thorpe started 16 games for the Monarchs in 2022, pitching to an 8-2 record and 4.96 ERA with 75 strikeouts in 81.2 innings of work.

On 24 February 2023, Thorpe was released by Kansas City.

=== Dorados de Chihuahua ===
On 2 February 2024, Thorpe signed with the Toros de Tijuana of the Mexican League. On 10 April, Thorpe was loaned to the Dorados de Chihuahua of the Mexican League. In 18 games (17 starts) for Chihuahua, he logged a struggled to a 1–7 record and 5.30 ERA with 80 strikeouts across 74 2/3 innings pitched.

Thorpe made 7 appearances (2 starts) for Chihuahua in 2025, struggling to an 0-1 record and 12.41 ERA with 13 strikeouts across 12 1/3 innings pitched.

=== Saraperos de Saltillo ===
On 20 May 2025, Thorpe and Cristian Santana were traded to the Saraperos de Saltillo in exchange for Alejandro Mejía and Rusber Estrada. In 14 appearances for Saltillo, he posted a 3-2 record and 6.39 ERA with 12 strikeouts across 12 2/3 innings pitched. Thorpe was released by the Saraperos on 14 July.
