= Elián Leyva =

Cuban baseball player (born 1989)

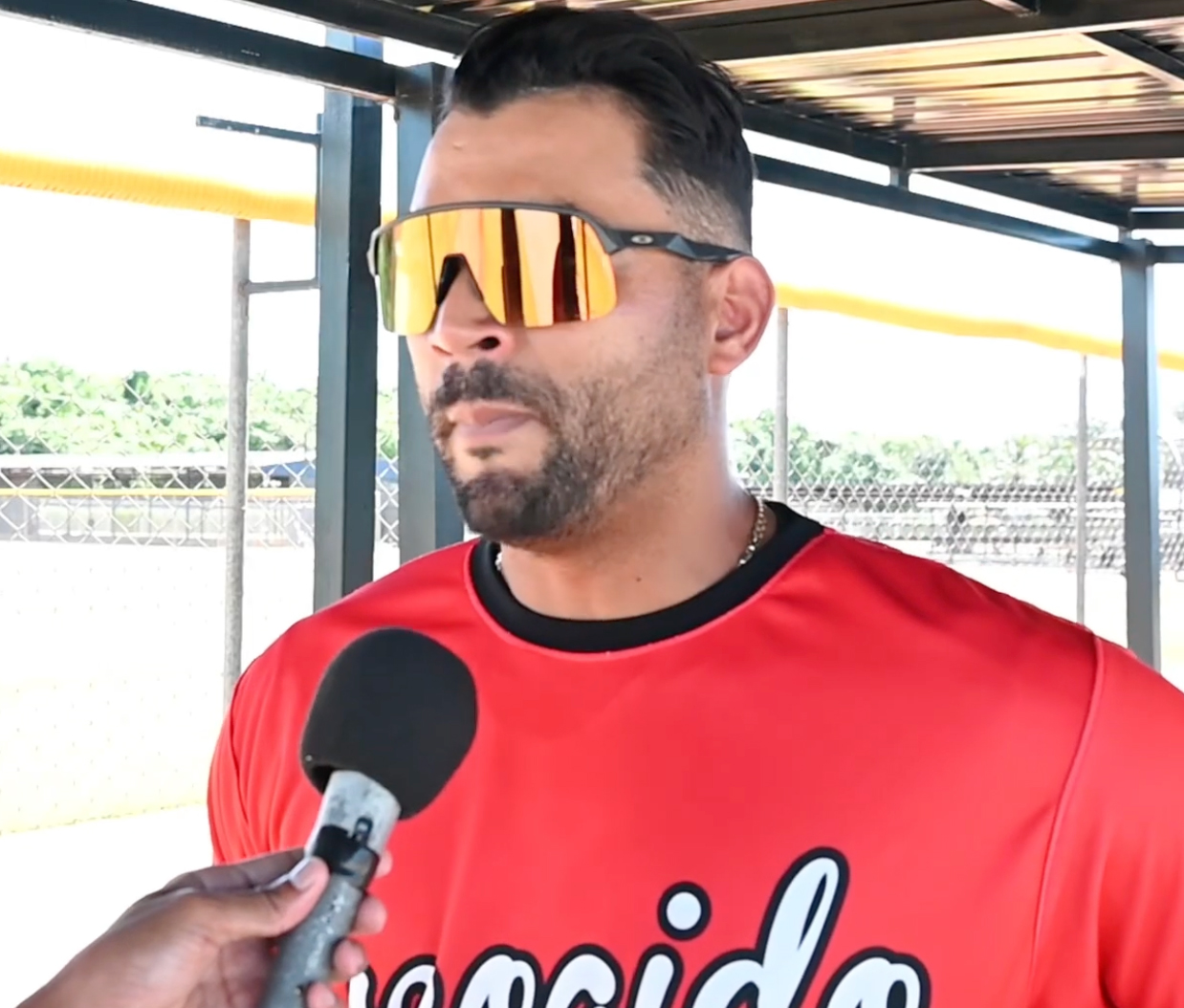
- Leyva in 2024

Dorados de Chihuahua – No. 53
- Pitcher
- Born: 17 March 1989 (age 37); San José de las Lajas, Cuba
- Bats: Right Throws: Right

CPBL debut
- April 27, 2023, for the Rakuten Monkeys

CPBL statistics (through 2023 season)
- Win–loss record: 4–3
- Earned run average: 3.88
- Strikeouts: 56
- Stats at Baseball Reference

Teams
- Rakuten Monkeys (2023)

Elián Leyva Delgado (born 17 March 1989) is a Cuban and Spanish professional baseball pitcher for the Dorados de Chihuahua of the Mexican League. He has previously played in the Chinese Professional Baseball League (CPBL) for the Rakuten Monkeys. Leyva has represented both Cuba and Spain in international baseball competitions, including playing for Cuba in the 2023 World Baseball Classic.

In addition to his native Cuba, he has played professionally in Spain, Venezuela, the United States, Mexico, Italy, Taiwan and the Dominican Republic.

== Early career ==
Leyva was born on 28 December 1996 in San José de las Lajas, La Habana Province (now Mayabeque Province), Cuba. He originally played football before switching to baseball at age 13, drawn by its popularity as Cuba's favorite sport. After being spotted by scouts, he was invited to enroll in the Escuela de Iniciación Deportiva Escolar (Sports Initiation School) in Havana, where he developed as a pitcher and was regarded as one of the best youth pitchers in the country.

== Career ==
=== Cuban National Series ===
Leyva made his debut in the Cuban National Series in the 2007–08 season with the Vaqueros de La Habana, aged 17. He would go on to play with La Habana for two more seasons. In 2009, the Vaqueros won the Cuban National Series, defeating the Naranjas de Villa Clara in the final series.

On 1 January 2011, La Habana Province was split into two new provinces: Artemisa Province and Mayabeque Province. This also led to the creation of two new baseball teams that replaced the Vaqueros: Cazadores de Artemisa and Huracanes de Mayabeque; Leyva was assigned to the latter. He played with Mayabeque for four more seasons, including three games as a reinforcement for the Industriales during the 2013–14 season.

In 2015, following the end of the 2014–15 season, Leyva left Cuba and migrated to Spain, where he later established residence with the goal of pursuing a professional baseball career. In seven seasons in the Cuban National Series, he finished with a 5.68 ERA in 201 1/3 innings pitched.

=== CB Barcelona ===
In 2016, Leyva joined CB Barcelona of the Spanish División de Honor de Béisbol. He finished the season with a 4–2 record, posting a 0.70 ERA with 82 strikeouts in 64 innings pitched.

=== Atlanta Braves ===
On 11 November 2016, Leyva signed a minor league contract with the Atlanta Braves organization. On 6 October 2017, he was assigned to the rookie-level Gulf Coast League Braves, but he did not play a single game with the affiliate. On 8 April 2018, he was assigned to the Mississippi Braves of the Double-A Southern League. He spent the 2018 season playing for the Mississippi Braves and the Triple-A Gwinnett Stripers, appearing in 34 games, posting a 4–3 record with 79 strikeouts in 87 innings pitched and a 2.69 ERA.

Leyva made nine appearances for Gwinnett during the 2019 campaign, recording a 5.00 ERA with 16 strikeouts and one save over 18 innings of work.

=== Sultanes de Monterrey ===
On 15 May 2019, Leyva was loaned to the Sultanes de Monterrey of the Mexican League. He appeared in ten games for Monterrey, posting a 4–2 record and 4.61 ERA with 44 strikeouts across 52 2/3 innings pitched.

=== Fortitudo Baseball Bologna ===
In 2020, Leyva was signed by Fortitudo Baseball Bologna of the Italian Baseball League. He finished the 2020 season with a 0–2 record in three appearances and a 3.50 ERA over 10 innings pitched, winning the Italian championship with Fortitudo. He returned in 2021, appearing in two games and finishing with a 0–1 record and a 3.60 ERA over 5 innings pitched.

=== Algodoneros de Unión Laguna ===
On 27 March 2021, Leyva was signed by the Algodoneros de Unión Laguna of the Mexican League. He appeared in six games for the team, struggling to a 1–4 record and a 11.25 ERA with 14 strikeouts over 24 innings of work. Leyva was released by the Algodoneros on 29 June.

=== Tecolotes de los Dos Laredos ===
On 1 July 2021, Leyva signed with the Tecolotes de los Dos Laredos of the Mexican League. Leyva played in only one game for Dos Laredos, taking the loss after allowing four runs on nine hits with three strikeouts over 3 2/3 innings pitched.

=== Piratas de Campeche ===
On 17 July 2021, Leyva was signed by the Piratas de Campeche of the Mexican League. He made his debut with the team on 23 July against the Tigres de Quintana Roo, losing the game after pitching 4 2/3 innings and allowing five runs. In four appearances (three starts) for Campeche, Leyva logged a 2-1 record and 3.32 ERA with 17 strikeouts over 19 innings pitched.

Leyva made 11 starts for the Piratas during the 2022 campaign, registering a 4-6 record and 5.34 ERA with 50 strikeouts across 57 1/3 innings pitched. On 5 July 2022, Leyva was placed on the reserve list by Campeche.

=== Leones de Yucatán ===
On 12 July 2022, Leyva was traded to the Leones de Yucatán. He appeared in three games for Yucatán, recording one win with a 1.88 ERA with 19 strikeouts across 14 1/3 innings of work.

=== Rakuten Monkeys ===
On 19 February 2023, Levya signed with the Rakuten Monkeys of the Chinese Professional Baseball League. He finished the season with a 4–3 record in 12 games, posting a 3.88 ERA and 56 strikeouts over 67 1/3 innings pitched.

=== Leones de Yucatán (second stint) ===
On 11 April 2024, Leyva signed with the Leones de Yucatán for his second stint with the team. He made 13 starts for Yucatán, posting a 6–2 record with 45 strikeouts and a 3.86 ERA across 58 1/3 innings pitched.

=== Charros de Jalisco ===
On 9 April 2025, Leyva was signed by the Charros de Jalisco of the Mexican League; Leyva previously played for the Charros in the Mexican Pacific League from 2018 to 2021, winning the Triple Crown in the 2018–19 season. In seven appearances for Jalisco, he posted a 1–0 record and 7.77 ERA with 15 strikeouts across 22 innings pitched. Leyva was released by the Charros on 10 June.

=== Caliente de Durango ===
On 18 April 2026, Leyva signed with the Caliente de Durango of the Mexican League. He appeared in six games, posting a 6.08 ERA and 14 strikeouts over 26 2/3 innings pitched.

=== Dorados de Chihuahua ===
On 25 May 2026, Leyva and Andre Lipcius were traded to the Dorados de Chihuahua of the Mexican League in exchange for Devin Smeltzer and Alejandro Mejía.

== International career ==
=== Spain national baseball team ===
Leyva is eligible to play for Spain since he is a Spanish resident. He was first called up to represent the national team during the 2020 Summer Olympics qualification tournament held in Italy. He made one appearance as a reliever, pitching a scoreless inning against the Czech Republic, in Spain's 3–7 loss.

He appeared in two games in the 2021 European Baseball Championship, played in Italy. He started in the 15–2 group stage victory against Germany, pitching 4.1 scoreless innings and striking out eight batters. He then started in the bronze medal game against Italy, which ended in a 0–2 defeat, delivering 6.0 scoreless innings with seven strikeouts.

In February 2025, Leyva was chosen to represent Spain at the 2026 World Baseball Classic qualification. He started the opening game against hosts Chinese Taipei, pitching 2.1 innings, allowing one run; he was awarded the win in Spain's 12–5 victory, finishing with a 3.86 ERA.

=== Cuba national baseball team ===
"When they called me, it was easy to say yes... It is a dream come true because since I was little, I always wanted to represent my country in an international event, and what better than to do it in a World Baseball Classic"

— Leyva on being called up to play for Cuba in the 2023 World Baseball Classic

Leyva was selected to represent Cuba at the 2023 World Baseball Classic, an opportunity he described as "a dream come true".

During the tournament, he appeared in two games. He started in Cuba's 7–1 victory over Chinese Taipei, pitching 2.1 scoreless innings, allowing just one hit and two walks, while striking out four batters; he was credited with the win. He then played as a reliever in the semifinal game against the United States, which Cuba lost 2–14, pitching 1.1 innings, allowing one walk, three hits, one home run, and three runs, finishing the tournament with a 7.36 ERA.

== Career statistics ==
=== International ===
Team	Year	G	W	L	IP	H	R	ER	BB	SO	HR	ERA
Spain	2019	1	0	0	1.0	1	0	0	0	1	0	0.00
Spain	2021	2	0	0	10.1	6	1	0	1	15	0	0.00
Spain	2025	1	1	0	2.1	5	2	1	2	1	1	3.86
Cuba	2023	2	1	0	3.2	4	3	3	3	5	1	7.36
Total		6	2	0	17.1	16	6	4	6	22	1	2.08
