= Estadio Monumental Chihuahua =

Stadium in Chihuahua, Mexico

Estadio Héctor Espino
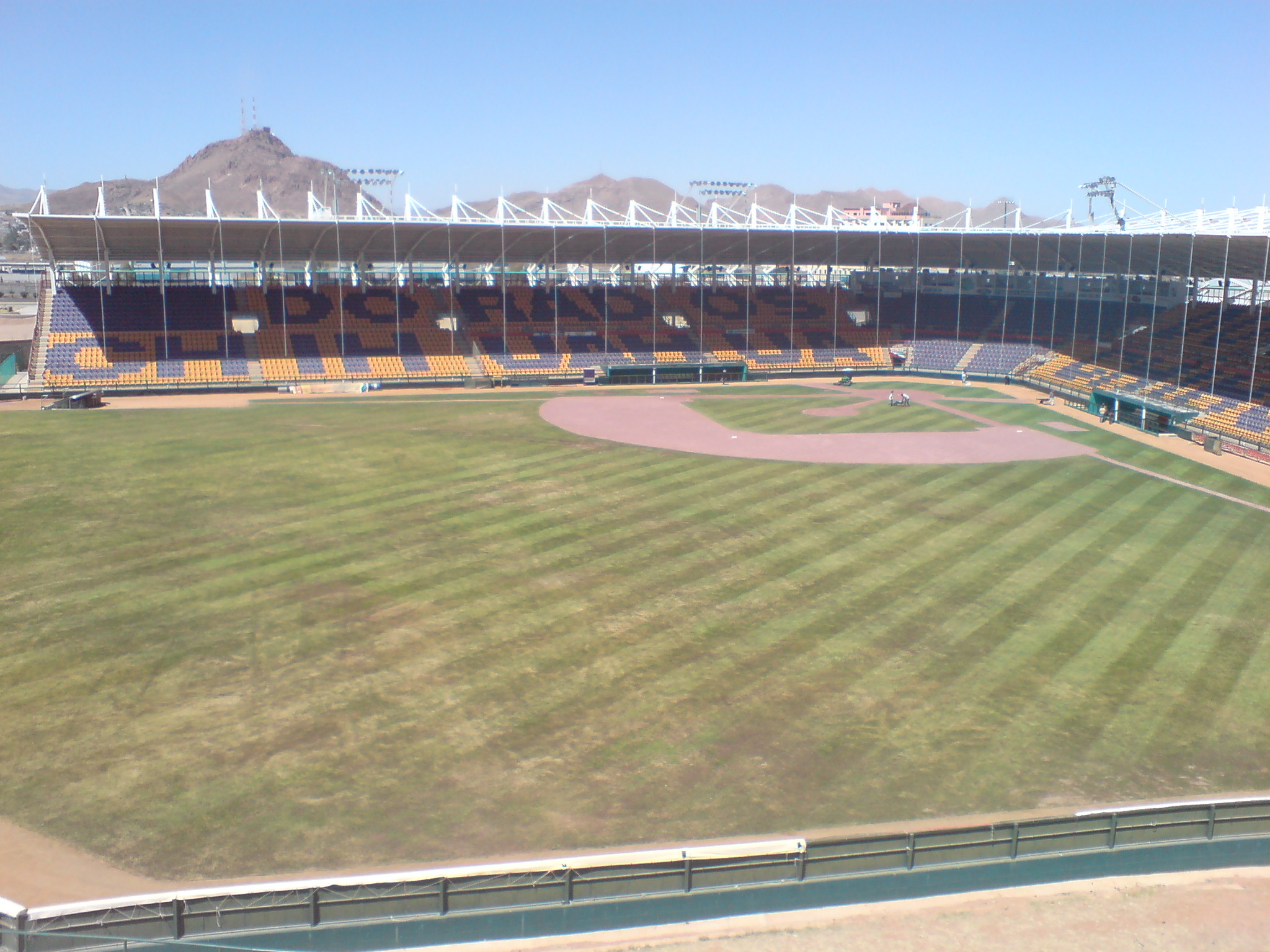
- Estadio Chihuahua 2009
- Interactive map of Estadio Héctor Espino
- Full name: Estadio Monumental Héctor Espino
- Location: Chihuahua, Chihuahua, Mexico
- Coordinates: 28°37′33″N 106°1′20″W
- Capacity: 15,500

Construction
- Opened: 2005

Tenant
- Dorados de Chihuahua

Estadio Monumental Chihuahua is a stadium in Chihuahua, Mexico. It is primarily used for baseball, and is the home field of the Dorados de Chihuahua baseball team of the Mexican League. It holds 15,500 people and opened in 2005.

In 2010 the stadium was refurbished in order to host the Dorados de Chihuahua of the Mexican League.
