= Devin Smeltzer =

American baseball player (born 1995)

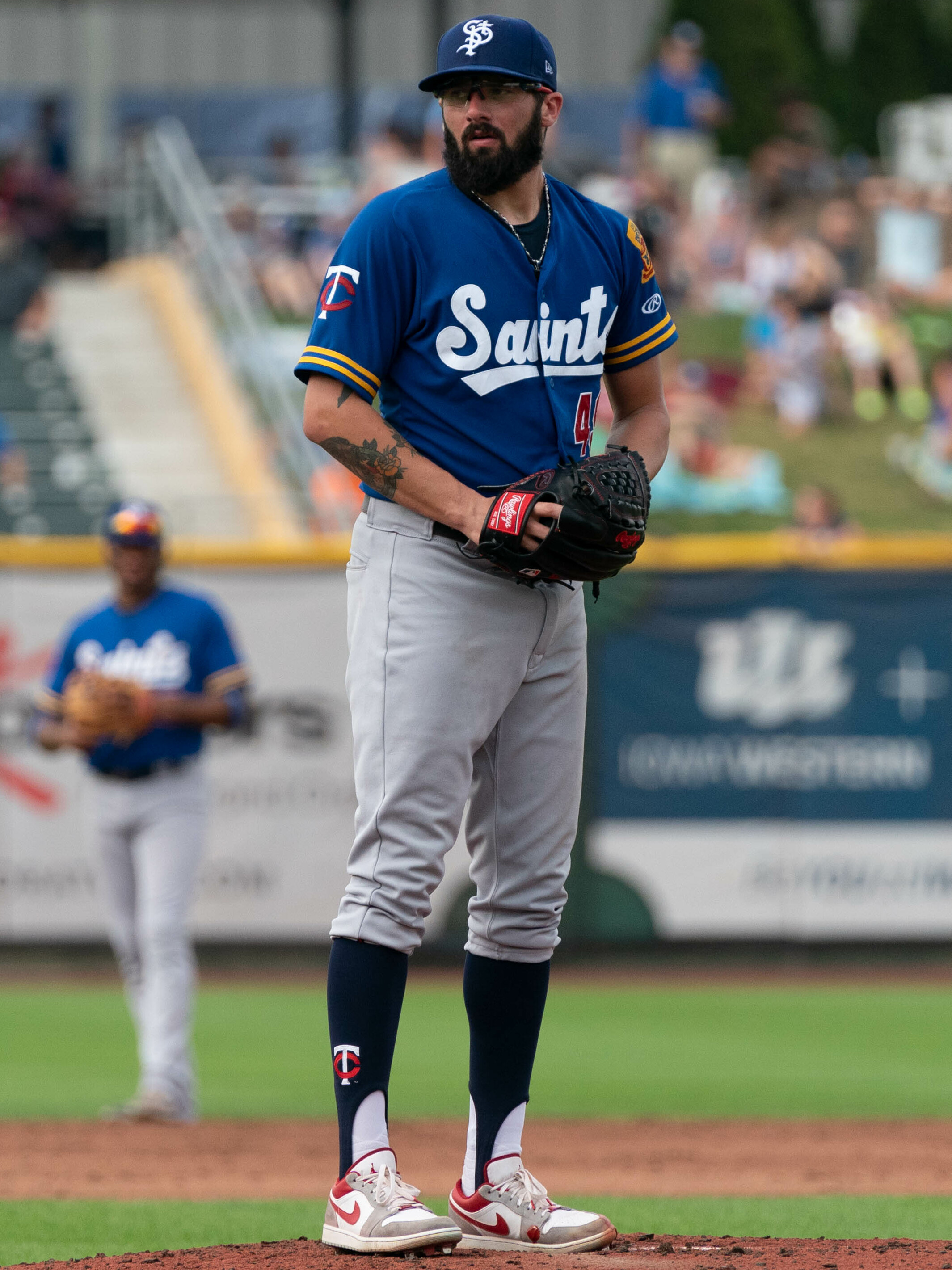
- Smeltzer with the St. Paul Saints in 2022

Algodoneros de Unión Laguna
- Pitcher
- Born: September 7, 1995 (age 31); Voorhees, New Jersey, U.S.
- Bats: Right Throws: Left

MLB debut
- May 28, 2019, for the Minnesota Twins

MLB statistics (through 2023 season)
- Win–loss record: 9–5
- Earned run average: 4.32
- Strikeouts: 112
- Stats at Baseball Reference

Teams
- Minnesota Twins (2019–2022); Miami Marlins (2023)

Devin Paul Smeltzer (born September 7, 1995) is an American professional baseball pitcher for Algodoneros de Unión Laguna of the Mexican League. He has previously played in Major League Baseball (MLB) for the Minnesota Twins and Miami Marlins.

== Amateur career ==
Smeltzer attended Bishop Eustace Preparatory School in Pennsauken Township, New Jersey, and played for the school's baseball team. The San Diego Padres selected him in the 33rd round of the 2014 MLB draft, but he chose to enroll at Florida Gulf Coast University to play college baseball for the Florida Gulf Coast Eagles rather than sign with the Padres. He pitched to a 1–4 win–loss record and a 6.19 earned run average (ERA) for the Eagles.

In the summer of 2015, he played collegiate summer baseball for the Hyannis Harbor Hawks of the Cape Cod Baseball League, where he and Ian Hamilton were named the co-most valuable players of the league's all-star game, and threw a nine-inning no-hitter in which he missed a perfect game by a single walk.

After one year with the Eagles, Smeltzer transferred to San Jacinto College, so that he would become eligible in the 2016 MLB draft. Smeltzer had a 9–3 record and a 1.18 ERA with 128 strikeouts in 91 2/3 innings pitched for San Jacinto's baseball team. He committed to transfer to Texas Tech University on a baseball scholarship after his sophomore year.

== Professional career ==
=== Los Angeles Dodgers ===
The Los Angeles Dodgers selected Smeltzer in the fifth round of the 2016 MLB draft. He signed with the Dodgers rather than transferring to Texas Tech, and received a $500,000 signing bonus. He played for the Arizona Dodgers of the Rookie-level Arizona League after signing and went 0–2 with a 7.59 ERA in 10.2 relief innings pitched. He began the 2017 season with the Great Lakes Loons of the Single–A Midwest League. In 2017, he made ten starts for Great Lakes and 15 (plus one relief appearance) for the Rancho Cucamonga Quakes of the High–A California League. He was 7–7 with a 4.17 ERA between the two teams. Smeltzer began the 2018 season with the Tulsa Drillers of the Double–A Texas League.

=== Minnesota Twins ===
On July 31, 2018, the Dodgers traded Smeltzer to the Minnesota Twins, along with Logan Forsythe and Luke Raley, in exchange for Brian Dozier. He was assigned to the Chattanooga Lookouts of the Double-A Southern League and finished the season there. In 33 games (14 starts) between Tulsa and Chattanooga, he was 5–5 with a 4.52 ERA. He opened the 2019 season with the Pensacola Blue Wahoos of the Southern League, going 3–1 with a 0.60 ERA in 30 innings. He was promoted to the Rochester Red Wings of the Triple-A International League on May 2.

The Twins promoted Smeltzer to the major leagues on May 28, 2019. He made his major league debut the same night, allowing three hits and no runs, while striking out seven in six innings. Smeltzer finished the season with a 3.86 ERA, striking out 18.8% of the batters he faced. In 2020, Smeltzer recorded a 2–0 record and 6.75 ERA with 15 strikeouts in 16 innings pitched.

On July 17, 2021, Smeltzer was placed on the 60-day injured list with left elbow inflammation. Smeltzer made one appearance for the Twins in 2021 and was outrighted off of the 40-man roster on November 19.

The Twins promoted Smeltzer back to the major leagues on May 14, 2022. He made 15 appearances for the Twins, including 12 games started, and pitched to a 3.71 ERA in 70 1/3 innings. In October, Smeltzer was sent outright to Triple-A and chose to elect free agency on October 11.

=== Miami Marlins ===
On January 24, 2023, Smeltzer signed a minor league contract with the Miami Marlins organization. On April 9, Smeltzer’s contract was selected to the active roster. Smeltzer made 5 appearances (1 start) for Miami, posting a 6.75 ERA with 8 strikeouts in 12.0 innings pitched. He was designated for assignment by the Marlins on April 28, following the promotion of Johan Quezada. He cleared waivers and was sent outright to the Triple-A Jacksonville Jumbo Shrimp on May 2.

On May 3, Smeltzer was selected back to the Marlins' roster after Quezada was designated for assignment. He tossed 3.2 innings that day against the Atlanta Braves, surrendering 3 runs on 3 hits with 2 strikeouts. The following day, he was designated for assignment after Chi Chi Gonzalez had his contract selected. Smeltzer again cleared waivers and was outrighted to Jacksonville on May 6. On August 3, Smeltzer was again added to the major league roster. After two scoreless appearances for Miami, he was designated for assignment on August 5. On August 8, he cleared waivers and was outrighted to Triple–A.

On September 1, Smeltzer tossed the first no-hitter in Jumbo Shrimp history, logging 4 strikeouts in 7.0 innings against the Charlotte Knights. On September 6, Smeltzer was once more selected back to Miami's major league roster. After tossing 3 2/3 relief innings against the Los Angeles Dodgers the previous day, Smeltzer was designated for assignment for a fourth time on September 8. He cleared waivers and was outrighted to Jacksonville on September 11. Smeltzer elected free agency on October 15.

On December 7, 2023, Smeltzer re-signed with the Marlins on a minor league contract. In 24 relief outings for Triple–A Jacksonville, he compiled a 3.69 ERA with 32 strikeouts and one save across 31 2/3 innings pitched. On July 10, 2024, Smeltzer was released by the Marlins organization.

=== Dorados de Chihuahua ===
On November 19, 2024, Smeltzer signed with the Dorados de Chihuahua of the Mexican League. In 13 starts for Chihuahua in 2025, Smeltzer posted a 4-4 record and 5.17 ERA with 60 strikeouts across 78 1/3 innings pitched.

=== Detroit Tigers ===
On July 8, 2025, Smeltzer signed a minor league contract with the Detroit Tigers. In three starts for the Triple-A Toledo Mud Hens, he struggled to an 0-1 record and 8.44 ERA with seven strikeouts across 10 2/3 innings pitched. Smeltzer was released by the Tigers organization on August 4.

=== Dorados de Chihuahua (second stint) ===
On December 22, 2025, Smeltzer signed with the Dorados de Chihuahua of the Mexican League. In seven starts for Chihuahua in 2026, Smeltzer posted a 1–3 record with a 6.32 ERA and 32 strikeouts across 37 innings pitched.

=== Caliente de Durango ===
On May 25, 2026, Smeltzer and Alejandro Mejía were traded to Caliente de Durango of the Mexican League in exchange for Andre Lipcius and Elián Leyva. In 12 starts with Durango he threw 54.2 innings going 6-3 with a 5.43 ERA and 49 strikeouts.

=== Algodoneros de Unión Laguna ===
On November 9, 2026, Smeltzer was traded to the Algodoneros de Unión Laguna for Hector Perez and Kevin Lopez.

== Personal life ==
At the age of nine, Smeltzer was diagnosed with pelvic rhabdomyosarcoma, a form of cancer. A tumor had grown against his bladder that was connected to his prostate. He was treated with surgery and chemotherapy at St. Christopher's Hospital for Children in Philadelphia. The cancer went into full remission in 2012.

In 2006 while battling cancer, Smeltzer was invited to Citizens Bank Park to meet Phillies players Chase Utley and Cole Hamels. In 2018, Utley was on the Dodgers and Smeltzer, was a member of the Dodgers organization. During spring training, Dodgers manager Dave Roberts told the story to the Dodgers clubhouse and reintroduced the two. After hearing the story, Smeltzer's teammates gave him a round of applause.
