= Andre Lipcius =

American baseball player & coach (born 1998)

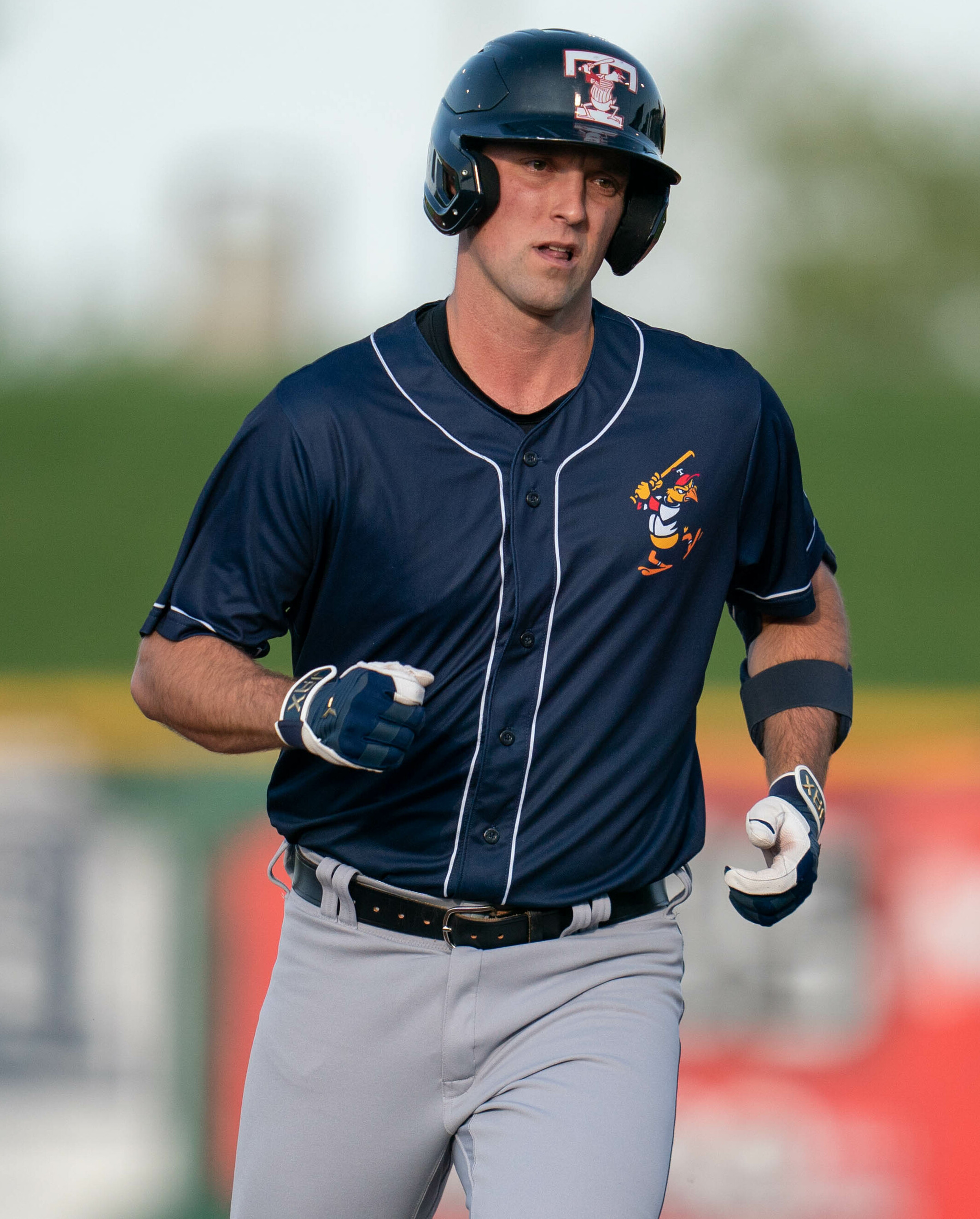
- Lipcius with the Toledo Mud Hens in 2023

Colorado Rockies
- Infielder / Coach
- Born: May 22, 1998 (age 28); Annapolis, Maryland, U.S.
- Batted: Right Threw: Right

MLB debut
- September 1, 2023, for the Detroit Tigers

Last MLB appearance
- September 28, 2023, for the Detroit Tigers

MLB statistics
- Batting average: .286
- Home runs: 1
- Runs batted in: 4
- Stats at Baseball Reference

Teams
- Detroit Tigers (2023)

Andre Martinas Lipcius (born May 22, 1998) is an American former professional baseball infielder who currently serves as the game–planning coach for the Colorado Rockies of Major League Baseball (MLB). He played in MLB for the Detroit Tigers in 2023.

== Playing career ==
=== Amateur career ===
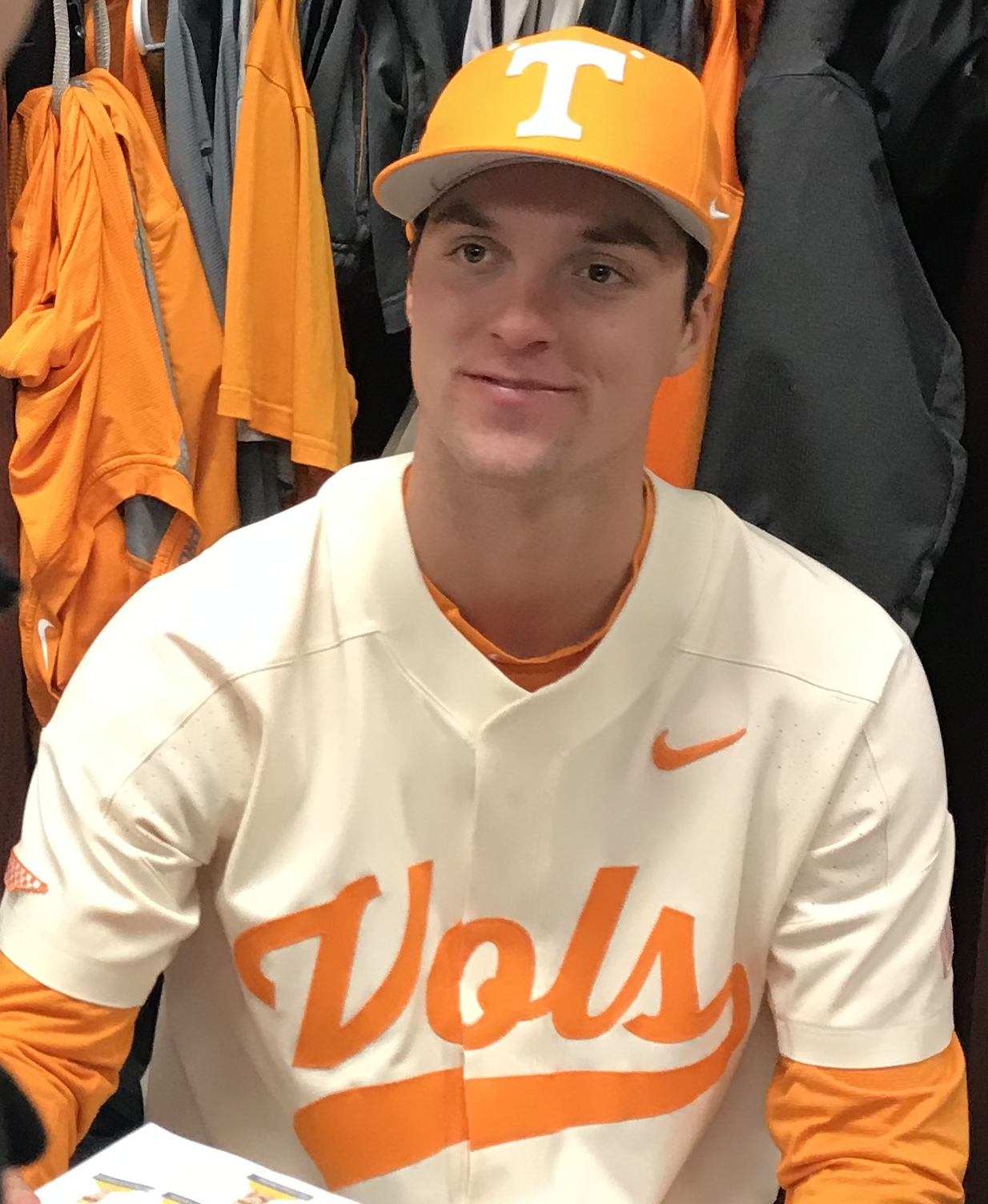
Lipcius with Tennessee in 2019

Lipcius attended Lafayette High School in Williamsburg, Virginia, where he was a four-year letterman and a team captain. He committed to the University of Tennessee, where he played with his brother and fraternal twin, Luc, and majored in nuclear engineering. As a freshman, he was named to the Southeastern Conference All-Freshman Team, as he started all 52 of the team's games at first base leading the team with 11 doubles. He moved to shortstop as a sophomore and improved on nearly all his batting metrics, including jumping from one to seven home runs, and improving his average from .275 to .315. In 2018, he played collegiate summer baseball with the Harwich Mariners of the Cape Cod Baseball League, and was named a league all-star. He finished his career as a junior, starting all 61 games for the Volunteers at third base, and leading the team with 17 home runs to go with 58 RBI, a .306 average, and a team-leading 72 hits.

=== Detroit Tigers ===
The Detroit Tigers selected Lipcius in the third round, 83rd overall, in the 2019 Major League Baseball draft and he was assigned to the Single-A West Michigan Whitecaps to start his career, where he hit .273 over 253 at bats, with an OBP of .344. When the COVID-19 pandemic led to the cancellation of the minor league season in 2020, Lipcius played with the Peninsula Pilots in the Coastal Plain League.

In 2021, Lipcius started the season in West Michigan, now at the High-A level due to the shake-up in affiliates in the Tigers organization. On June 1, he received a call-up to the Double-A Erie SeaWolves. At the time of his call-up, Lipcius led the Whitecaps in batting average at .277, had three home runs and 13 RBIs, and had 12 walks to 16 strikeouts, helping him to an OBP of .357 and an OPS of .839. With the SeaWolves, he hit .235 in 94 games with nine homers and 46 RBI. He split the 2022 season between Erie and the Triple-A Toledo Mud Hens, batting a combined .277 with 12 homers and 63 RBI in 134 games.

On November 15, 2022, the Tigers added Lipcius to their 40-man roster to protect him from the Rule 5 draft. He was optioned to the Toledo Mud Hens to begin the 2023 season, where, in 97 games, he batted .272/.363/.419 with 11 home runs and 58 RBI.

On September 1, 2023, Lipcius was promoted to the major leagues for the first time, making his debut as a pinch hitter in the seventh inning against the Chicago White Sox. His first major league hit was a home run off Mike Clevinger of the White Sox the following day. In 13 games, Lipcius hit .286/.342/.400 with one home run and four RBI. He was designated for assignment by the Tigers on February 29, 2024.

=== Los Angeles Dodgers ===
On March 4, 2024, Lipcius was traded to the Los Angeles Dodgers in exchange for cash considerations. The Dodgers designated him for assignment on March 16. Lipcius cleared waivers and was sent outright to the Triple–A Oklahoma City Baseball Club on March 23. In 140 appearances, he batted .271 with 25 home runs and 89 RBI. Lipcius was released by the Dodgers organization on December 16.

=== Chicago White Sox ===
On December 18, 2024, Lipcius signed a minor league contract with the Chicago White Sox. He made 106 appearances for the Triple-A Charlotte Knights in 2025, batting .240/.318/.447 with 18 home runs and 71 RBI. Lipcius elected free agency following the season on November 6, 2025.

=== Caliente de Durango ===
On April 14, 2026, Lipcius signed with the Caliente de Durango of the Mexican League. Lipcius made 28 appearances for Durango, slashing .324/.381/.537 with five home runs and 21 RBI.

=== Dorados de Chihuahua ===
On May 25, 2026, Lipcius and Elián Leyva were traded to the Dorados de Chihuahua of the Mexican League in exchange for Devin Smeltzer and Alejandro Mejía. Lipcius made 56 appearances for Chihuahua, batting .255/.322/.421 with seven home runs and 40 RBI.

== Coaching career ==
On November 2, 2026, the Colorado Rockies hired Lipcius to serve as their game–planning coach, replacing the retiring Ronnie Gideon.
