= Ryne Harper =

American baseball player

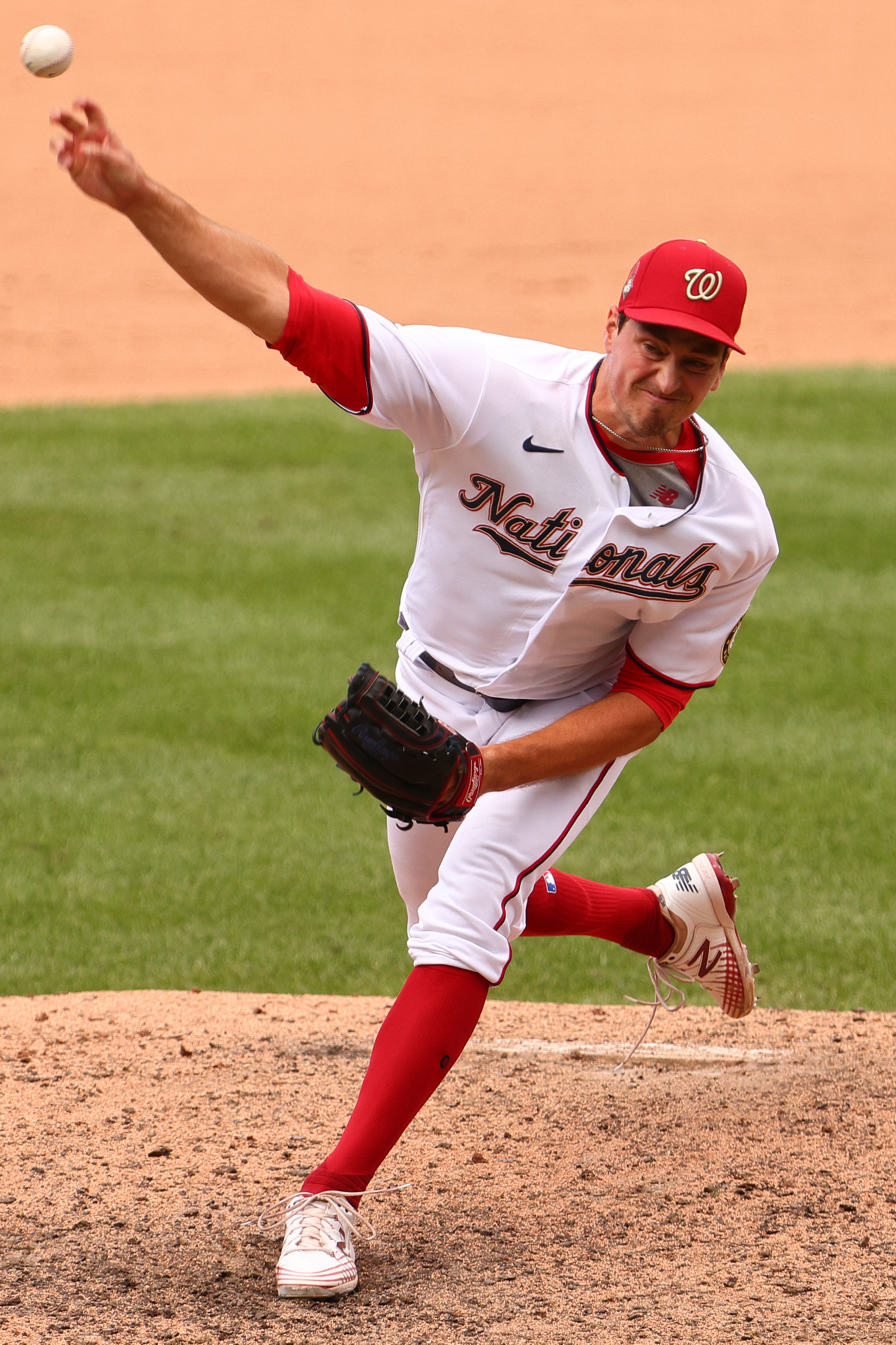
- Harper with the Washington Nationals in 2020
- Pitcher
- Born: March 27, 1989 (age 36); Clarksville, Tennessee, U.S.
- Batted: Right Threw: Right

MLB debut
- March 31, 2019, for the Minnesota Twins

Last MLB appearance
- October 2, 2021, for the Washington Nationals

MLB statistics
- Win–loss record: 5–4
- Earned run average: 4.67
- Strikeouts: 106
- Stats at Baseball Reference

Teams
- Minnesota Twins (2019); Washington Nationals (2020–2021)

Ryne Richard Harper (born March 27, 1989) is an American former professional baseball pitcher. He played in Major League Baseball (MLB) for the Minnesota Twins and Washington Nationals.

== Amateur career ==
Harper attended Clarksville High School in Clarksville, Tennessee. He played college baseball for the Austin Peay Governors. In 2011, his senior year, he went 6–2 with a 4.62 ERA over 48 2/3 innings.

== Professional career ==
=== Atlanta Braves ===
Harper was drafted by the Atlanta Braves in the 37th round of the 2011 Major League Baseball draft.

In his debut season of 2011 he played for the GCL Braves and the Danville Braves, going a combined 3-0 with a 0.59 ERA in 30.1 innings. He split the 2012 season between the Rome Braves and the Lynchburg Hillcats, going a combined 2-3 with a 2.73 ERA in 69.1 innings. His 2013 season was spent with the Mississippi Braves, going 6-3 with a 2.77 ERA in 55.1 innings. In 2014, he once again spent the season with the Mississippi Braves, going 9-5 with a 2.82 ERA in 76.2 innings. After the 2014 regular season, Harper played for the Peoria Javelinas of the Arizona Fall League. He split the 2015 season between the Rome Braves and the Mississippi Braves, combining to go 0-1 with a 2.04 ERA in 35.1 innings. During the 2015 off-season, Harper played for the Cañeros de Los Mochis of the Mexican Pacific Winter League.

=== Seattle Mariners ===
On December 11, 2015, Harper was sent to the Seattle Mariners to complete an earlier trade for José Ramírez. Harper spent the 2016 season with the Jackson Generals, going 4-5 with a 3.04 ERA in 68 innings. He split the 2017 season between the Arkansas Travelers and the Tacoma Rainiers, combining to go 4-2 with a 3.35 ERA in 53 2/3 innings. Harper was called up to the majors for the first time on May 28, 2017. He was outrighted on June 17, without making an appearance in the majors. He elected free agency on November 6.

=== Minnesota Twins ===
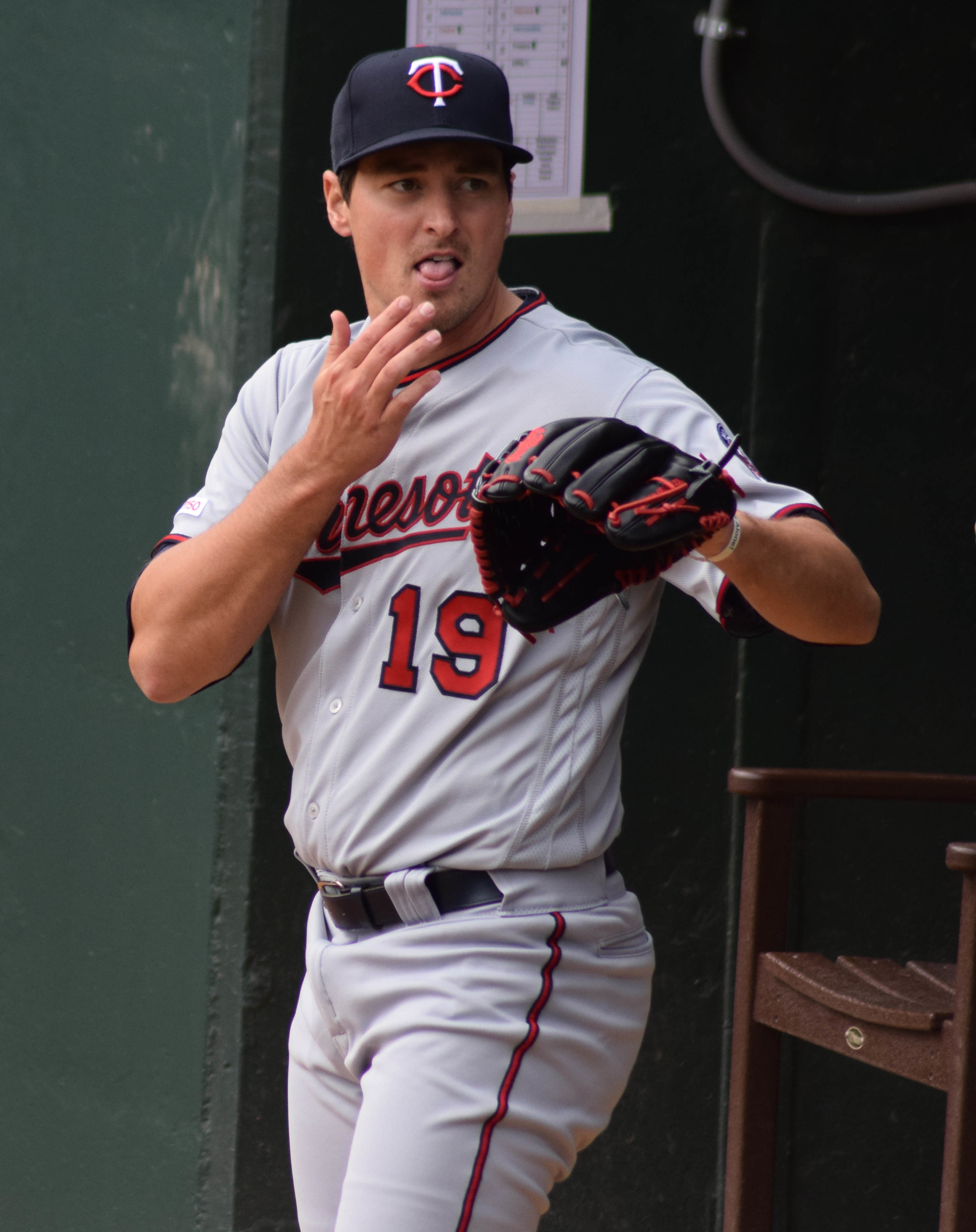
Harper with the Minnesota Twins in 2019

On February 2, 2018, Harper signed a minor-league contract with the Minnesota Twins. He split the 2018 season between the Chattanooga Lookouts and the Rochester Red Wings, combining to go 1-5 with a 3.60 ERA in 65 innings. During the 2018 off-season, Harper played in two games for the Bravos de Margarita of the Venezuelan Winter League.

In 2019, Harper received a non-roster invitation to major-league spring training. Harper made the Twins' Opening Day roster out of spring training. He made his major league debut on March 31, 2019, versus the Cleveland Indians, recording one scoreless inning of relief. He got his first career save on May 28, 2019, against the Milwaukee Brewers.

On August 24, 2019, the Twins assigned Harper to the Triple-A Rochester Red Wings. He finished 4–1 with an ERA of 3.81 in 61 games for Minnesota. Harper was designated for assignment by the Twins on January 24, 2020.

=== Washington Nationals ===
Harper was traded to the Washington Nationals on January 29, 2020, for minor league pitcher Hunter McMahon. In 2020, Harper was 1–0 with a 7.61 ERA over 23 2/3 innings.

On November 30, 2021, Harper was non-tendered by the Nationals, making him a free agent.

=== Wild Health Genomes ===
On April 21, 2022, Harper signed with the Wild Health Genomes of the Atlantic League of Professional Baseball. Harper struggled to a 6.94 ERA in 20 appearances, striking out 31 in 23 1/3 innings pitched before he was released on July 4.

On August 9, 2023, Harper confirmed his retirement from baseball. He has since gone on to work as a real estate agent.
