= Kohl Stewart =

American baseball player (born 1994)

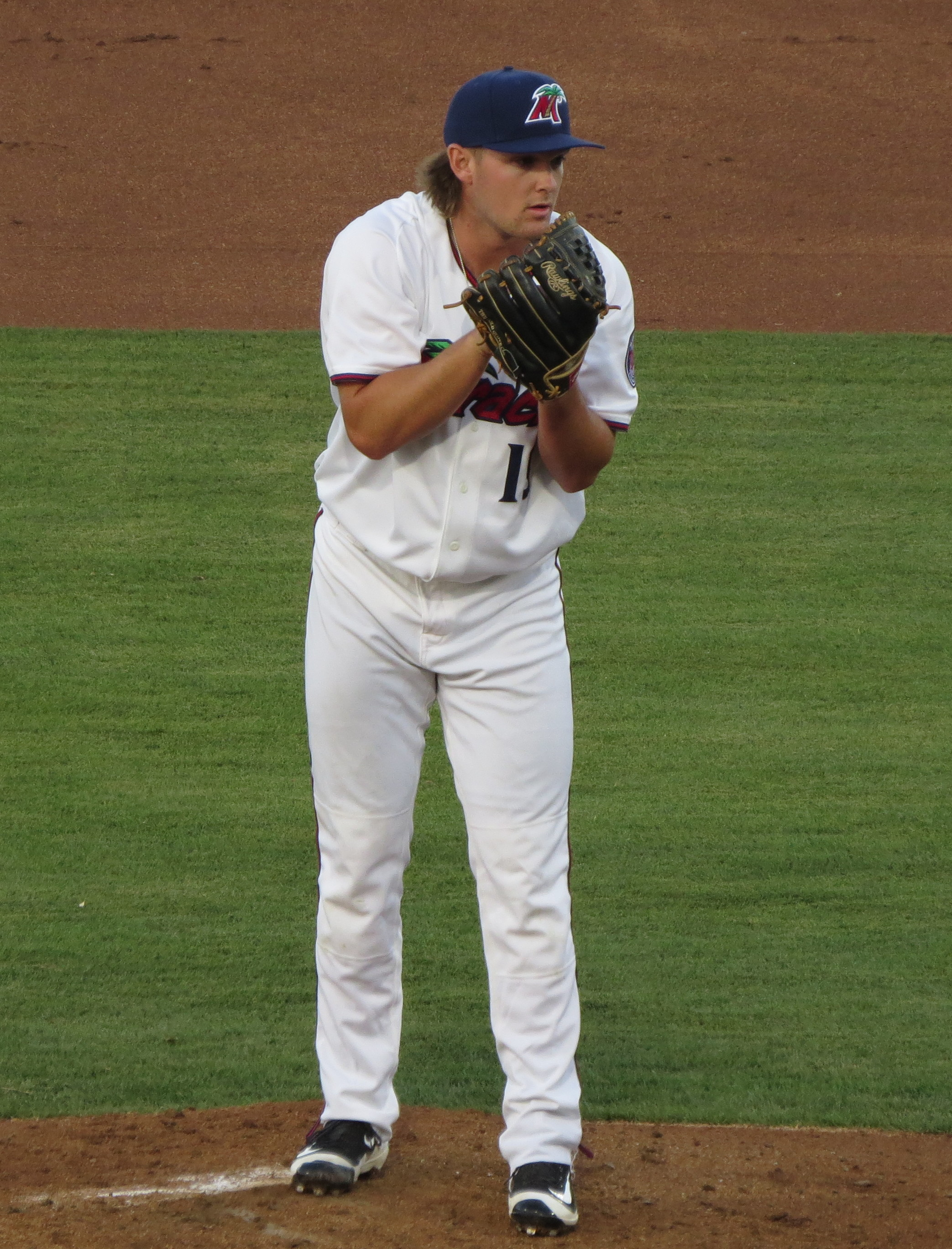
- Stewart with the Fort Myers Miracle
- Pitcher
- Born: October 7, 1994 (age 32); Houston, Texas, U.S.
- Batted: Right Threw: Right

MLB debut
- August 12, 2018, for the Minnesota Twins

Last MLB appearance
- July 5, 2021, for the Chicago Cubs

MLB statistics
- Win–loss record: 5–4
- Earned run average: 4.88
- Strikeouts: 45
- Stats at Baseball Reference

Teams
- Minnesota Twins (2018–2019); Chicago Cubs (2021)

Kohl Robert Stewart (born October 7, 1994) is an American former professional baseball pitcher. He has previously played in Major League Baseball (MLB) for the Minnesota Twins and Chicago Cubs. He was the fourth overall selection in the 2013 MLB draft.

== Amateur career ==
Stewart attended St. Pius X High School in Houston, Texas, and played St Pius X's baseball team as a pitcher and football team as a quarterback. A top college football recruit, Stewart committed to attend Texas A&M University, to play for the Texas A&M Aggies football team.

== Professional career ==
=== Minnesota Twins ===
The Minnesota Twins selected Stewart with the fourth overall selection in the 2013 MLB draft. Stewart signed with the Twins, bypassing Texas A&M for a $4,544,400 signing bonus. After signing, Stewart played for both the Gulf Coast League Twins and Elizabethton Twins, posting a combined 1.35 ERA with 24 strikeouts in 20 total innings between both teams. In 2014, he played for the Cedar Rapids Kernels, compiling a 3–5 record and 2.59 ERA in 19 starts, and in 2015, he played for the Fort Myers Miracle where he pitched to a 7–8 record and 3.20 ERA in 22 games. Stewart spent 2016 with both Fort Myers and the Chattanooga Lookouts, posting a combined 12–8 record, 2.88 ERA, and 1.34 WHIP in 25 total starts between both clubs, and 2017 with Chattanooga, going 5–6 with a 4.09 ERA in 16 starts, along with starting one game for the Rochester Red Wings.

He split his 2018 minor league season between Chattanooga and Rochester, accumulating a 3–7 record with a 4.47 ERA in 108.2 innings. The Twins called up Stewart to the major leagues on August 12, 2018. He started the game that day, making his major league debut. Over 8 major league games, he went 2–1 with a 3.68 ERA in 36 2/3 innings.

Stewart opened the 2019 season back with Rochester. After he was called up, he pitched in nine games for the Twins, and was 2-2 with a 6.39 ERA and 10 strikeouts. On November 4, 2019, Stewart was outrighted off the Twins roster and elected free agency.

=== Baltimore Orioles ===
On December 29, 2019, Stewart signed a split contract with the Baltimore Orioles. After missing a scheduled start against the Miami Marlins due to a COVID-19 outbreak among the Marlins, Stewart opted out of the 2020 season on July 31, 2020 as he has Type 1 diabetes. He elected free agency on October 29, 2020.

=== Chicago Cubs ===
On January 28, 2021, Stewart signed a one-year, $700K deal with the Chicago Cubs. On May 31, Stewart was recalled to the active roster and made his first appearance since 2019 as the starting pitcher against the San Diego Padres. On July 6, Stewart was placed on the injured list with right elbow inflammation and was later transferred to the 60-day IL on July 29. On November 10, 2021, Stewart was released after refusing a minor league assignment from the Cubs.

=== Kansas City Royals ===
On January 10, 2023, Stewart signed a minor league contract with the Kansas City Royals. Stewart did not appear in a game for the organization and was released by Kansas City following the season on November 13.
