= Ian Miller (baseball) =

American baseball player (born 1992)

- Outfielder
- Born: February 21, 1992 (age 33); Philadelphia, Pennsylvania
- Batted: Left Threw: Right

MLB debut
- September 4, 2019, for the Minnesota Twins

Last MLB appearance
- August 23, 2020, for the Chicago Cubs

MLB statistics
- Batting average: .176
- Home runs: 0
- Runs batted in: 1
- Stats at Baseball Reference

Teams
- Minnesota Twins (2019); Chicago Cubs (2020)

Ian Andrew Miller (born February 21, 1992) is an American former professional baseball outfielder. He played in Major League Baseball (MLB) for the Minnesota Twins and Chicago Cubs.

== Career ==
Miller attended Bishop Shanahan High School in Downingtown, Pennsylvania and played college baseball at Wagner College.

=== Seattle Mariners ===
Miller was drafted by the Seattle Mariners in the 14th round of the 2013 Major League Baseball draft. He signed and spent 2013 with both the Pulaski Mariners and Everett AquaSox, batting a combined .305 with one home run and 14 RBIs in 52 total games between both clubs. In 2014, he played for the Clinton LumberKings where he slashed .271/.332/.349 with 13 RBIs and 16 stolen bases in 45 games, and in 2015, he played for the Bakersfield Blaze and Jackson Generals, compiling a .267 batting average with 29 RBIs and 50 stolen bases in 126 total games. Miller returned to Jackson in 2016 and batted .253 with 28 RBIs and 49 stolen bases in 114 games. He spent 2017 with both the Arkansas Travelers and Tacoma Rainiers and posted a combined .307 batting average with four home runs, 35 RBIs, and 43 stolen bases in 124 total games between the two teams.

In 2018, Miller returned to Tacoma, slashing .261/.333/.327 with two home runs, 41 RBIs, and 33 stolen bases in 114 games. He once again returned to Tacoma to open the 2019 season.

=== Minnesota Twins ===
On August 10, 2019, Miller was traded to the Minnesota Twins in exchange for cash considerations. He was assigned to the Rochester Red Wings following the trade.

On September 1, 2019, the Twins selected Miller's contract and promoted him to the major leagues for the first time. Miller made his major league debut on September 4 as a pinch runner and defensive replacement versus the Boston Red Sox. On October 28, Miller was outrighted off the Twins roster. He elected free agency on November 4.

=== Chicago Cubs ===
On December 18, 2019, Miller signed a minor league contract with the Chicago Cubs. On August 23, 2020, Miller was selected to the active roster. On August 31, Miller was designated for assignment after only appearing in one game for the Cubs as a pinch runner. Miller elected free agency on October 14. On November 18, 2020, Miller re-signed with the Cubs organization on a minor league contract. He elected free agency on November 7, 2021.
