= Taylor Rogers =

American baseball player (born 1990)

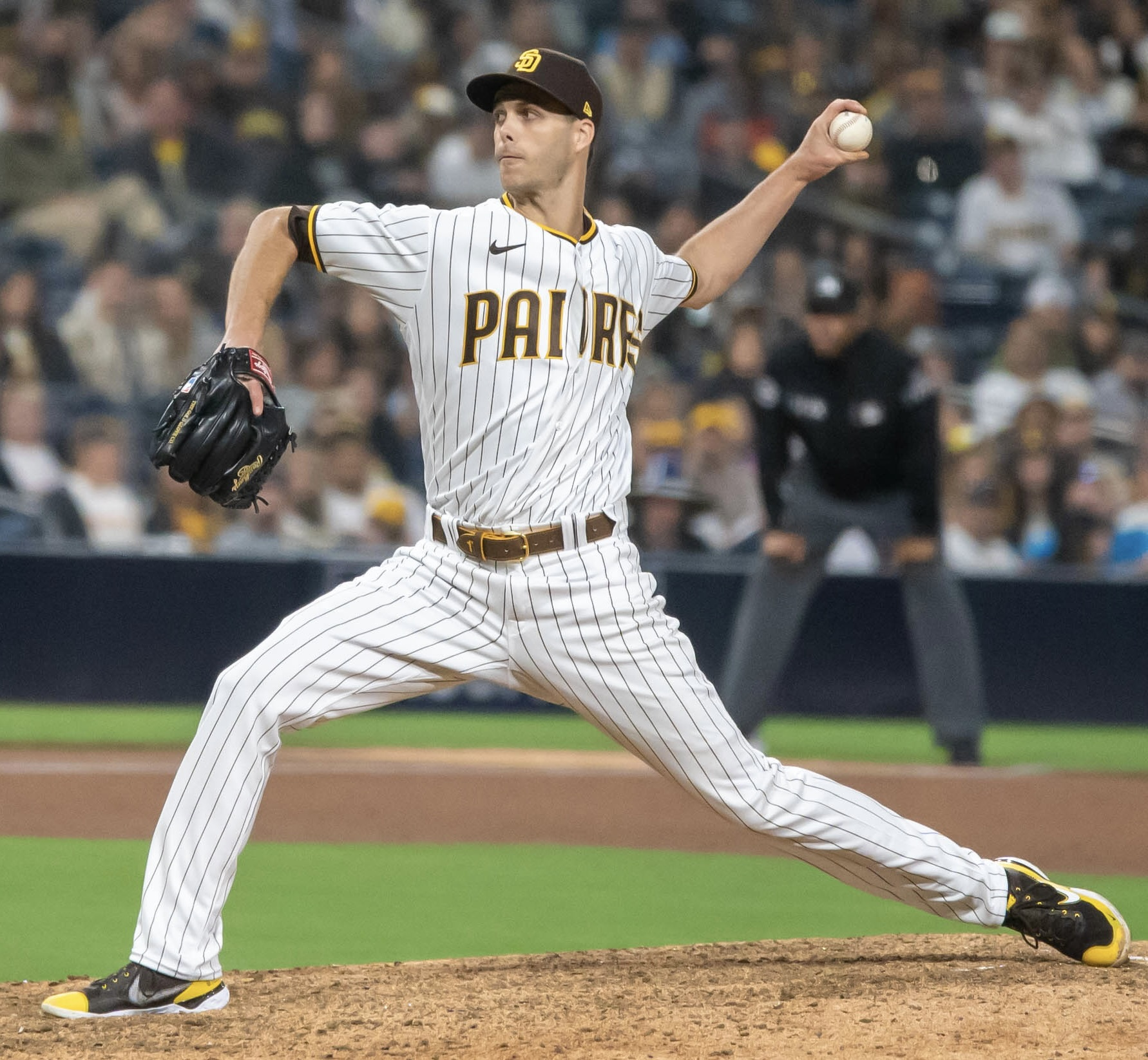
- Rogers with the San Diego Padres in 2022

Free agent
- Pitcher
- Born: December 17, 1990 (age 35); Denver, Colorado, U.S.
- Bats: Left Throws: Left

MLB debut
- April 14, 2016, for the Minnesota Twins

MLB statistics (through 2026 season)
- Win–loss record: 37–40
- Earned run average: 3.44
- Strikeouts: 680
- Stats at Baseball Reference

Teams
- Minnesota Twins (2016–2021); San Diego Padres (2022); Milwaukee Brewers (2022); San Francisco Giants (2023–2024); Cincinnati Reds (2025); Chicago Cubs (2025); Minnesota Twins (2026)

Career highlights and awards
- All-Star (2021)

Taylor Allen Rogers (born December 17, 1990) is an American professional baseball pitcher who is a free agent. He has played in Major League Baseball (MLB) for the San Diego Padres, Milwaukee Brewers, San Francisco Giants, Cincinnati Reds, Chicago Cubs, and Minnesota Twins. Rogers played college baseball for the Kentucky Wildcats and was selected by the Twins in the 11th round of the 2012 MLB draft. He was an MLB All-Star in 2021.

== Early life and high school career ==
Rogers was born on December 17, 1990, in Denver, Colorado. Raised in Littleton, he attended Chatfield Senior High School, graduating in 2009. Rogers played on both the school's baseball and basketball teams. In 2008, he posted a 5–2 win–loss record, a 1.98 earned run average (ERA), and 82 strikeouts in 53 innings pitched. That year, Rogers was named first-team All-State and first-team All-Colorado. In 2009, he was named All-Region.

== College career ==
The Baltimore Orioles selected Rogers in the 37th round, with the 1,106th overall selection, of the 2009 MLB draft. He did not sign with the Orioles, and instead attended the University of Kentucky to play college baseball for the Kentucky Wildcats. In 2010, Rogers posted a 4–7 record and a 6.40 ERA. He tied for the Southeastern Conference (SEC) lead in losses (7) and runs allowed (68). In 2011, Rogers tied for second in the SEC in losses (7), and was third-highest in runs allowed (56). After the 2011 season, he played collegiate summer baseball with the Harwich Mariners of the Cape Cod Baseball League. He posted a 2–3 record with a 1.76 ERA and a 0.95 WHIP in six starts, and was named a league all-star. In 2012, Rogers posted a 6–4 record and was fourth in the SEC in runs allowed (45) and 11th in strikeouts (84). Pitching in college from 2010 to 2012, he was 13–18 with a 5.35 ERA.

== Professional career ==
=== Draft and minor leagues ===
After his junior season at Kentucky, Rogers was selected 340th overall by the Minnesota Twins in the 11th round of the 2012 MLB draft. Rogers signed with the Twins for a signing bonus of $100,000, and made his professional debut that season with the Elizabethton Twins, and also played for the Beloit Snappers. In 15 games (10 starts) between both teams, he posted a 4–3 record with a 2.27 ERA.

Rogers started the 2013 season with the Cedar Rapids Kernels, and was later promoted to the Fort Myers Miracle during the season, with whom his 11 wins were third in the Florida State League and his three complete games and two shutouts led the league. In 25 games between the two clubs, 24 of which were starts, Rogers posted an 11–7 record with a 2.88 ERA. He was named a Florida State League post-season All Star.

In 2014, Rogers pitched for the New Britain Rock Cats, with whom he compiled an 11–6 record with a 3.29 ERA in 24 games started in which he pitched 145.0 innings (6th in the Eastern League) and had 113 strikeouts (5th), with his 11 wins tied for third in the league. He was named an Eastern League mid-season All Star.

In 2015, Rogers played for the Rochester Red Wings. He finished the season with an 11–12 record, a 3.98 ERA in 28 games (27 starts; tied for the International League lead) across 174.0 innings pitched (2nd) with 126 strikeouts (2nd); his 11 wins tied for third in the league. He was named an International League mid-season All Star. The Twins added Rogers to their 40-man roster after the 2015 season.

Rogers began the 2016 season with the Red Wings before being called up to Major League Baseball (MLB) shortly after the start of the season on April 13. He finished the 2016 season with a 0–1 win–loss record, a 4.50 earned run average (ERA), and 15 strikeouts in 18.0 innings pitched across seven games (two starts).

=== Minnesota Twins (2016–2021) ===
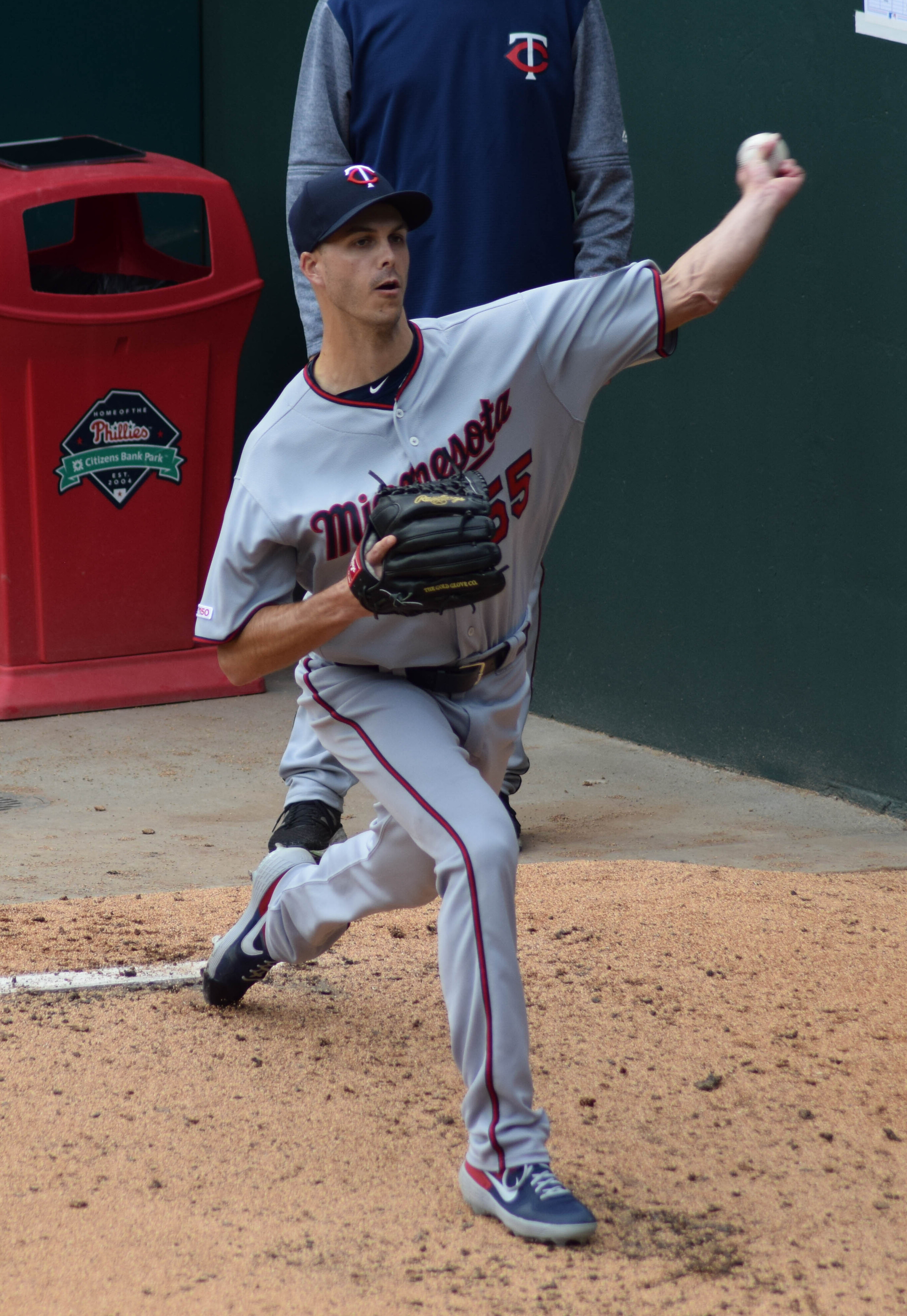
Rogers with the Minnesota Twins in 2019 at Citizens Bank Park

Rogers made his Major League Baseball (MLB) debut on April 14, 2016. Five days later, he was optioned to the Rochester Red Wings on April 19. Rogers was recalled to the Twins on May 17, where he remained for the rest of the season. He finished the 2016 season with a 3–1 record, a 3.96 ERA, and 64 strikeouts across 61 1/3 innings pitched in 57 relief appearances.

Rogers finished the 2017 season with a 7–3 record, a 3.07 ERA, and 49 strikeouts across 55 2/3 innings pitched in 69 relief appearances. He led MLB with 30 holds.

Rogers finished the 2018 season with a 1–2 record, a 2.63 ERA, and 75 strikeouts across 68 1/3 innings pitched in 72 relief appearances.

In 2019, Rogers began as a setup man before being installed as the closer. He was 2–4 and recorded 30 saves (4th in the AL) in 36 opportunities with an ERA of 2.61, striking out 90 batters in 69.0 innings (11.7 strikeouts per nine innings (K/9)), allowed 1.4 walks per nine innings (BB/9) (among the lowest 2% in MLB), and had a WHIP of 1.00. He received the Twins Joseph W. Haynes Pitcher of the Year Award.

In 2020, Rogers was 2–4 with nine saves (5th in the AL) and a 4.05 ERA in 21 games, in 20 innings in which he struck out 24 batters while walking four batters.

On July 12, 2021, Rogers was named to the 2021 All-Star Game. He finished the 2021 season with a 2–4 record, 9 saves, and a 3.35 ERA. In 40 1/3 innings pitched, he struck out 59 batters (13.2 K/9) with a 1.8 BB/9.

=== San Diego Padres (2022) ===
On April 7, 2022, the Twins traded Rogers with Brent Rooker and cash considerations to the San Diego Padres for Chris Paddack, Emilio Pagán, and a player to be named later. Minor leaguer Brayan Medina was sent to the Twins as the player to be named later on April 21.

Rogers became the Padres' closer, but was removed from the role in late July after two consecutive blown saves. Rogers made 42 relief appearances for the Padres during the 2022 season, accumulating a 1–5 record and a 4.35 ERA with 48 strikeouts across 41 1/3 innings pitched.

=== Milwaukee Brewers (2022) ===
On August 1, 2022, the Padres traded Rogers, Dinelson Lamet, Esteury Ruiz, and Robert Gasser to the Milwaukee Brewers for Josh Hader. Rogers made 24 relief appearances for the Brewers during the 2022 season, accumulating a 3–3 record and a 5.48 ERA with 36 strikeouts across 23.0 innings pitched.

Rogers finished the 2022 season with a combined 4–8 record with 31 saves (5th in the NL), a 4.76 ERA, and 84 strikeouts (11.8 K/9) in 64 1/3 innings pitched in 66 games (10th). He threw an 81 mph slider 63% of the time (which batters hit .177 against, and left-handed batters hit .102 against), and a 94 mph sinker 36% of the time (which batters hit .304 against, and left-handed batters hit .250 against).

=== San Francisco Giants (2023–2024) ===
On December 28, 2022, Rogers signed a three-year, $33 million contract with the San Francisco Giants, before his younger brother, Tyler, re-signed with the team. He made 60 appearances out of the bullpen in 2023, compiling a 6–4 record and a 3.83 ERA with 64 strikeouts across 51 2/3 innings pitched.

Rogers made 64 relief appearances for the Giants during the 2024 season, accumulating a 1–4 record and a 2.40 ERA with 64 strikeouts across 60.0 innings pitched.

=== Cincinnati Reds (2025) ===
On January 29, 2025, the Giants traded Rogers to the Cincinnati Reds in exchange for Braxton Roxby and cash considerations. He made 40 relief appearances for the Reds in 2025, compiling a 2–2 record and a 2.45 ERA with 34 strikeouts over 33 innings pitched.

=== Chicago Cubs (2025) ===
On July 30, 2025, the Reds traded Rogers with middle infield prospect Sammy Stafura and cash considerations to the Pittsburgh Pirates for third baseman Ke'Bryan Hayes. The following day, the Pirates traded Rogers to the Chicago Cubs with cash considerations for minor league outfielder Ivan Brethowr. He made 17 relief appearances for the Cubs in 2025, compiling a 1–0 record and a 5.09 ERA with 19 strikeouts over 17 2/3 innings pitched.

=== Minnesota Twins (second stint) ===
On January 23, 2026, Rogers signed a one-year, $2 million contract to return to the Twins.

== Personal life ==
Rogers has a mirror-image twin brother, Tyler, who is 30 seconds younger. Tyler is also a pitcher in Major League Baseball (MLB). On August 27, 2019, the Rogers brothers became the tenth set of twins to play in MLB after Tyler made his MLB debut pitching for the San Francisco Giants, while Taylor was pitching for the Minnesota Twins. On April 11, 2022, the Rogers brothers became the fifth set of twins to play in the same MLB game, with Taylor pitching for the San Diego Padres and Tyler pitching for the Giants. Additionally, it was the second time in MLB history that twins pitched in the same game and the first time they did so for opposing teams.
