= Dorados de Chihuahua =

Professional baseball team in the Mexican League

- Logo

Information
- League: Mexican League
- Location: Chihuahua City, Chihuahua
- Ballpark: Estadio Monumental Chihuahua
- Established: 1940 (original); 2024 (modern incarnation)
- Colors: Purple, gold and white
- Ownership: List: Anwar Mauricio Elías Ortíz, Sergio Carlos Mares de Alsuper, Víctor Almeida, Óscar Eugenio Baeza
- President: Anwar Mauricio Elías Ortíz
- Manager: Tony DeFrancesco

The Dorados de Chihuahua (English: Chihuahua Goldens) are a professional baseball team in the Mexican League based in Chihuahua City, Chihuahua. Their home ballpark is the Estadio Chihuahua.

Established in 1940, the Dorados have played in the Mexican League in four stints: in 1940, from 1973 to 1981, from 2007 to 2010, and most recently in 2024.

== History ==
=== Origins in the Mexican League ===
The Mexican League was founded in 1925 with five teams and slowly grew. By the late 1930s and 40s, the league was drawing the top players from the Negro leagues, including Satchel Paige, Cool Papa Bell, Martin Dihigo, Ray Dandridge and Willie Wells. Native Mexican talent was almost run out of the league in 1940, when many Cuban and Negro league stars took central stage – only a handful of Mexican players like Ángel Castro and Jesús Valenzuela were competitive with the foreign imports. Three Negro leaguers won Triple Crowns in a 4-year period – since then only three other players have won Triple Crowns in the Mexican League.

The Dorados de Chihuahua joined the Mexican League in 1940, after acquiring the Gallos de Santa Rosa franchise. The Dorados were 14-67 and 42 games out of first in dead last. The teams lone super stars were Lonnie Summers and Jacinto Roque, both of whom spent time on other clubs. The Dorados also played in the short-lived Mexican National League in 1946.

=== Arizona–Texas League ===
Formed from the Arizona State League in 1931, the Arizona–Texas League was a class D circuit that ran from '31-'32 and '37-'39. In '40-'41 it was promoted to class C, then halted play from 1942 to 1946. In '47-'50 the league again organized and competed until 1951 when it merged with the Sunset League to form the Southwest International League. Chihuahua joined the league towards the end in 1952, winning 57 and losing 83, finishing 27 and 1/2 games out of first. Though the team did not win as many games as expected, they drew an impressive 130,329 fans in 70 home games in 1952; out drawing every other team in the league by double.

=== The Central Mexican League ===
The Central Mexican League was a class C operation which lasted two seasons, 1956 and 1957. The six-team circuit was very offense-friendly and ERAs over 8 were about as common as ERAs under 3.50. Both the City of Juárez and Chihuahua represented the state of Chihuahua. In 1956 the great pitcher Marte de Alejandro propelled Chihuahua to a second-place finish behind the Saraperos de Saltillo by only a half game, with an astounding 129 strikeouts and 18 victories in the short season of only 100 games. Both teams had equal records on the last day of the season, yet a loss by Chihuahua and a forfeit by Saltillo's opponent gave the crown to the Saraperos. Chihuahua's manager Manuel Arroyo was furious, and promised a local paper that the Dorados would win in 1957, which they did. 1957 marked the Gold men's first crown outright, posting a 62 and 38 record behind the great pitching of Antonio Dicochea, 17 wins and 157 strikeouts.

=== Arizona–Mexico League ===
In 1955 the Arizona–Texas League became the Arizona–Mexico League. The circuit continued only four more seasons before the class C league big adieu to baseball. During these four seasons more than 1,700,000 fans went through the gate. The Mineros de Cananea were the only team to win more than one league title, taking two back to back, in 1955 and 1956. They drew 347,247 fans those two years. Chihuahua joined the league for its final year in 1958. In 1958 the Dorados, skippered by Leonel Aldama, went 56 and 62 falling to fourth place, yet still leading the league in 58 with 59,917 fans in attendance.

=== Return to the Mexican League ===
Chihuahua returned to the Mexican League in 1973 and went 527 and 776. Never climbing above second place, the Dorados were a fan favorite drawing the most fans over the 10-year stretch.

In 1973, the Dorados, under coaches Mauro Ruiz and Mauro Contreras, and with players such as Norm McRae, finished last in the North Division. In 1975, the team, under Miguel Gaspar almost reached playoffs. In 1976, the club had their best season in the team's second stint in the Mexican League with a 67–68 record.

In 1982, the Dorados franchise moved to Monclova and became the Acereros de Monclova, finishing the second stage of professional baseball in Chihuahua City.

=== Independent Semi Pro State Baseball ===
For much of the next 20 years, Chihuahua was without a professional team. Instead, a sponsored independent city team was organized to play against other independent teams in the surrounding area. Many college and high school players from the Texas-Louisiana league, along with stragglers from the now defunct Western League spent time playing among these teams gaining valuable experience. Some of the greatest imports from the US during this time were: pitcher Duke Richards later with the Alexandria Aces 19 wins and 3 losses, catcher Moose Edmunds from the Bend Bandits, .329 avg with 15 home runs and 4 steals of home (two coming in one game), outfielder George Wallace Johnson Jr 62 Stolen Bases, and Tim Leone cut from the Edinburg Roadrunners, was a heavy hitting first baseman who clubbed an amazing 40 home runs in one season for Chihuahua.

=== Third stint in the Mexican League ===
In 2003, official talks were held and actions were made to bring Dorados de Chihuahua back into the LMB, along with the team from Juárez. In 2007 The Mexican League announced the Tuneros de San Luis Potosí were moving to the city of Chihuahua. The Tuneros finished out of the playoffs in 2007 with an overall record of 49-61, which ranked 15th among 16 Liga teams in attendance. Just over 68,000 fans turned out for games in San Luis Potosí for an average of about 1,200 fans per game. Only the perpetually cash-strapped Piratas de Campeche did worse at the gate. Although the Tuneros never won an LMB pennant in San Luis, the old Dorados de Chihuahaua failed to even make the Mexican League playoffs in twelve seasons in the 1970s and 1980s. The new Dorados featured such holdovers from the Tuneros as Sharnol Adriana, Darryl Brinkley and Pat O'Sullivan. As the Liga's most northwesterly city after Tijuana, the Dorados remained in the LMB Northern Division until 2010, when they were sold and became the Rieleros de Aguascalientes, despite rumors that the Dorados would move to Nuevo Laredo.

=== Fourth stint in the Mexican League ===
In early 2023, news surfaced that professional baseball could return to Chihuahua for 2024. In November 2023, the Mexican League officially announced that the Dorados de Chihuahua would return for the 2024 season, as one of the two expansion teams, the other being the Conspiradores de Querétaro.

== Roster ==
Dorados de Chihuahua roster
| Players | | Coaches/Other |
|---|---|---|
| Pitchers: 50 (United States) Samuel Alvarado; 54 (United States) Raúl Barrón; 98 (Mexico) Yamil Castillo; 63 (Mexico) Daniel de la Fuente; 59 (Mexico) Josué Gámez; 61 (United States) Ralph Garza Jr.; 33 (Mexico) Demetrio Gutiérrez; 82 (Cuba) Elián Leyva; 40 (Venezuela) Edgar Navarro; 6 (Mexico) Vidal Nuño; 2 (United States) Gabriel Ponce; 57 (United States) Dereck Rodríguez; 22 (Mexico) Arturo Roque; 23 (United States) Caleb Smith; 55 (United States) Nick Struck; -- (Mexico) Darel Torres ∞; 44 (Mexico) Alan Valdez ∞; 51 (Dominican Republic) César Valdez; -- (United States) Nate Webb ∞ | Catchers: 60 (Mexico) Gustavo Ruiz ∞; 73 (Mexico) Gilberto Vizcarra; Infielders: 14 (Venezuela) Brainer Bonaci; 91 (Mexico) Joel Flores; 9 (Mexico) Oziel Flores; 34 (United States) Andre Lipcius; 1 (Mexico) Aarón Lugo; 69 (United States) Coco Montes; 29 (Mexico) Carlos Muñoz; 9 (Curaçao) Jonathan Schoop; 19 (Curaçao) Andrelton Simmons; Outfielders: 11 (United States) Justin Connell ∞; 8 (United States) Mark Contreras; -- (Dominican Republic) Estevan Florial; 4 (Mexico) Rafael Franco; 18 (Mexico) Jesús Loya ∞; 17 (Venezuela) Juan Yepez | Manager: 27 (Mexico) Homar Rojas; Coaches: -- (Venezuela) Lino Connell (bench); -- (Mexico) Iker Franco (catchers); -- (Mexico) Tury Morales (quality); -- (Venezuela) Richard Paz (third base); -- (Mexico) Marco Romero (hitting); -- (Mexico) Edgardo Saldaña (bullpen); -- (Mexico) Raúl Sánchez (first base); -- (Venezuela) Lino Urdaneta (pitching); 7-day injured list; ~ Development list; # Rehab assignment; ∞ Reserve list; ‡ Restricted list; § Suspended list; † Temporarily inactive list; Roster updated September 21, 2026; Transactions; → More rosters: MiLB • Mexican League |

== Resources ==
- Chihuahua Dorados
- Baseball Almanac
