= Mexican Baseball League Rookie of the Year Award =

Mexican League Rookie of the Year Award
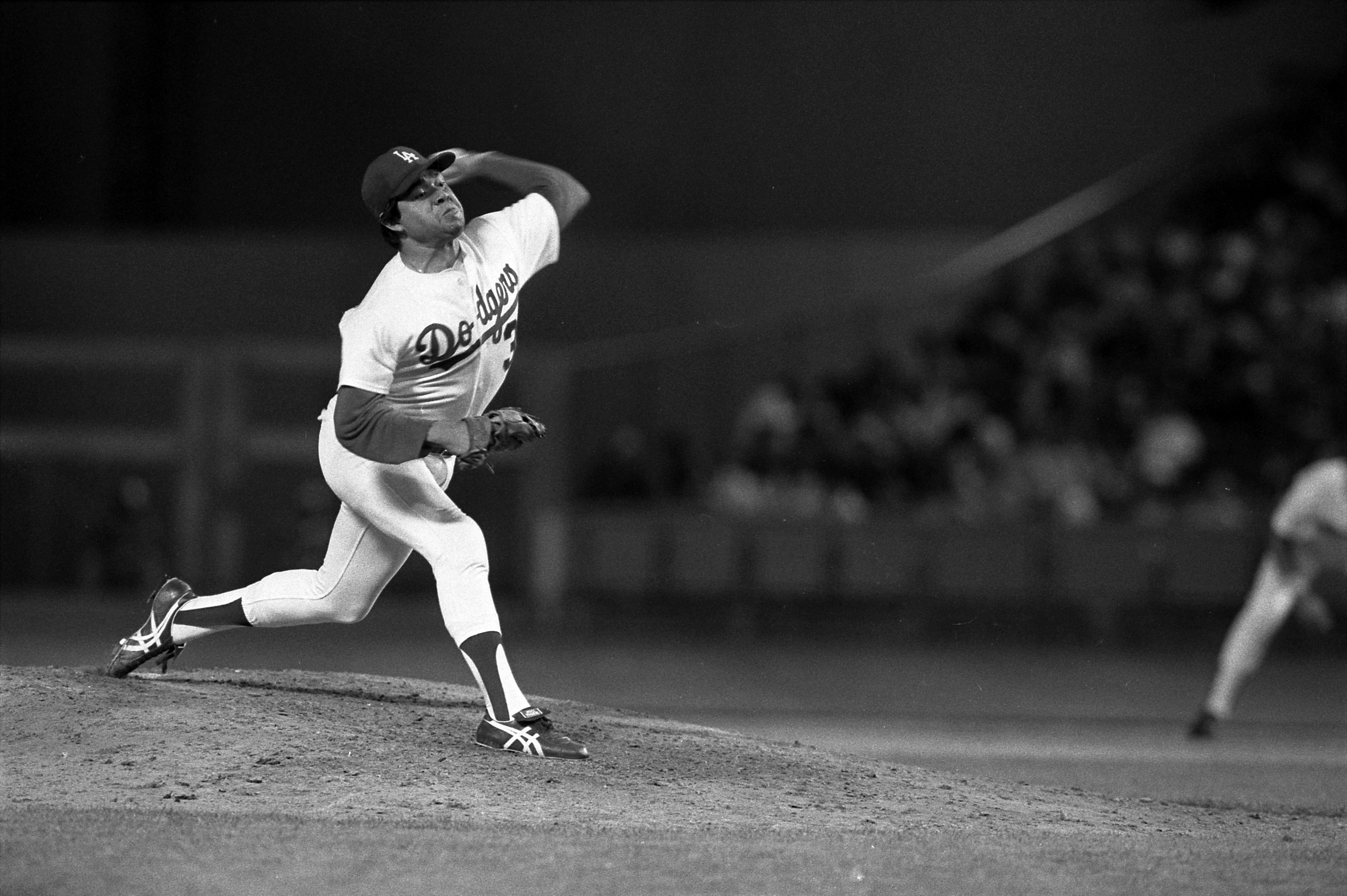
- Fernando Valenzuela won the 1979 award, and one year later, he made his MLB debut with the Los Angeles Dodgers
- Sport: Baseball
- League: Mexican League
- Awarded for: Best regular-season rookie
- Country: Mexico

History
- First award: 1937; 89 years ago
- Most recent: Denny Román

The Mexican League Rookie of the Year Award is presented annually to the most outstanding rookie in the baseball Mexican League, as selected by a vote of members of the press. The award was established in 1937, with Alfonso Nieto as its first recipient.

To be eligible, players must meet the following conditions: be Mexican; pitchers must not have more than 40 innings pitched; position players must not have more than 70 appearances; and they must not have played at the Double-A level or higher in the United States, or in equivalent levels abroad or in independent leagues.

== Winners ==
=== Key ===
†	Member of the Mexican Professional Baseball Hall of Fame
^	Denotes player who is still active
*	Denotes year in which the award was shared by a pitcher and a position player

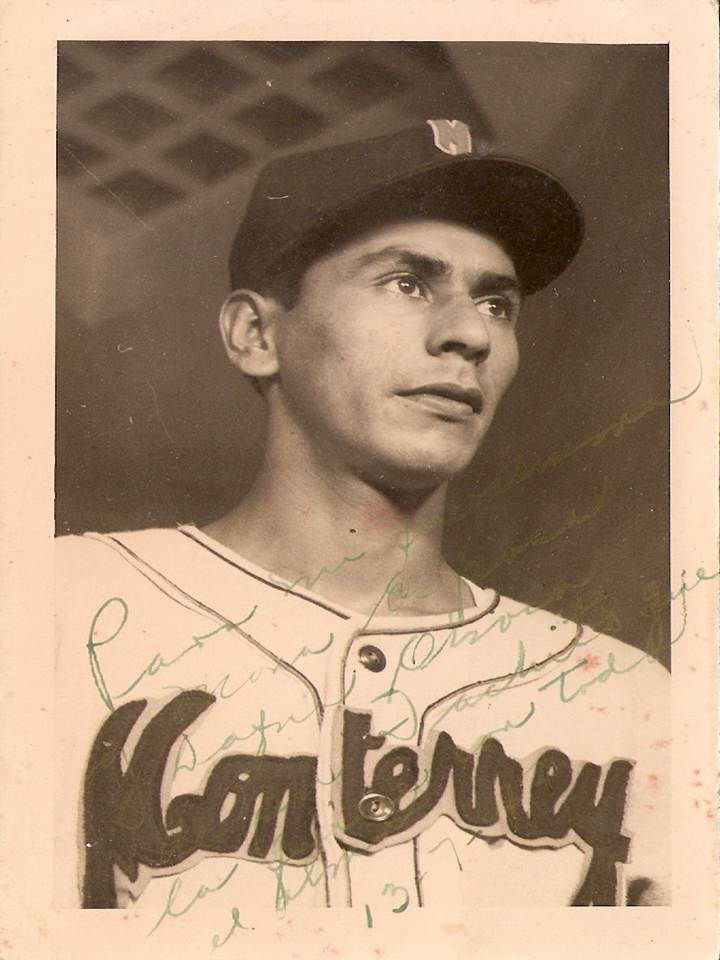
Epitacio Torres, 1939 winner

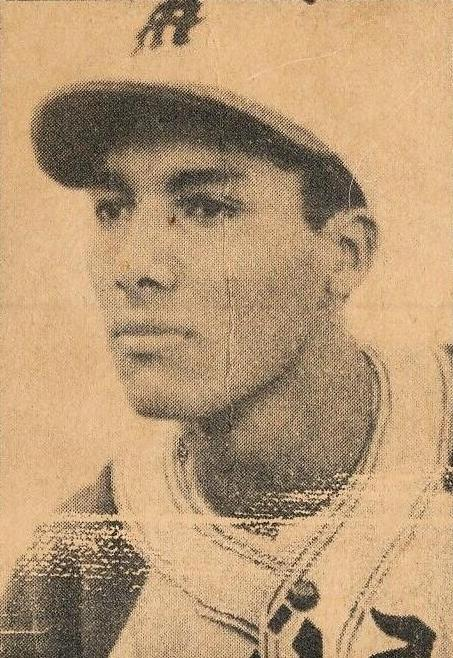
Beto Ávila, 1943 winner

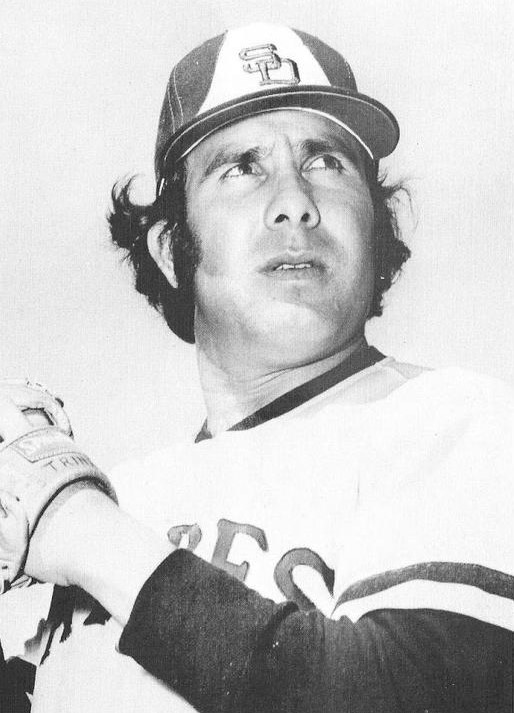
Vicente Romo, 1963 winner

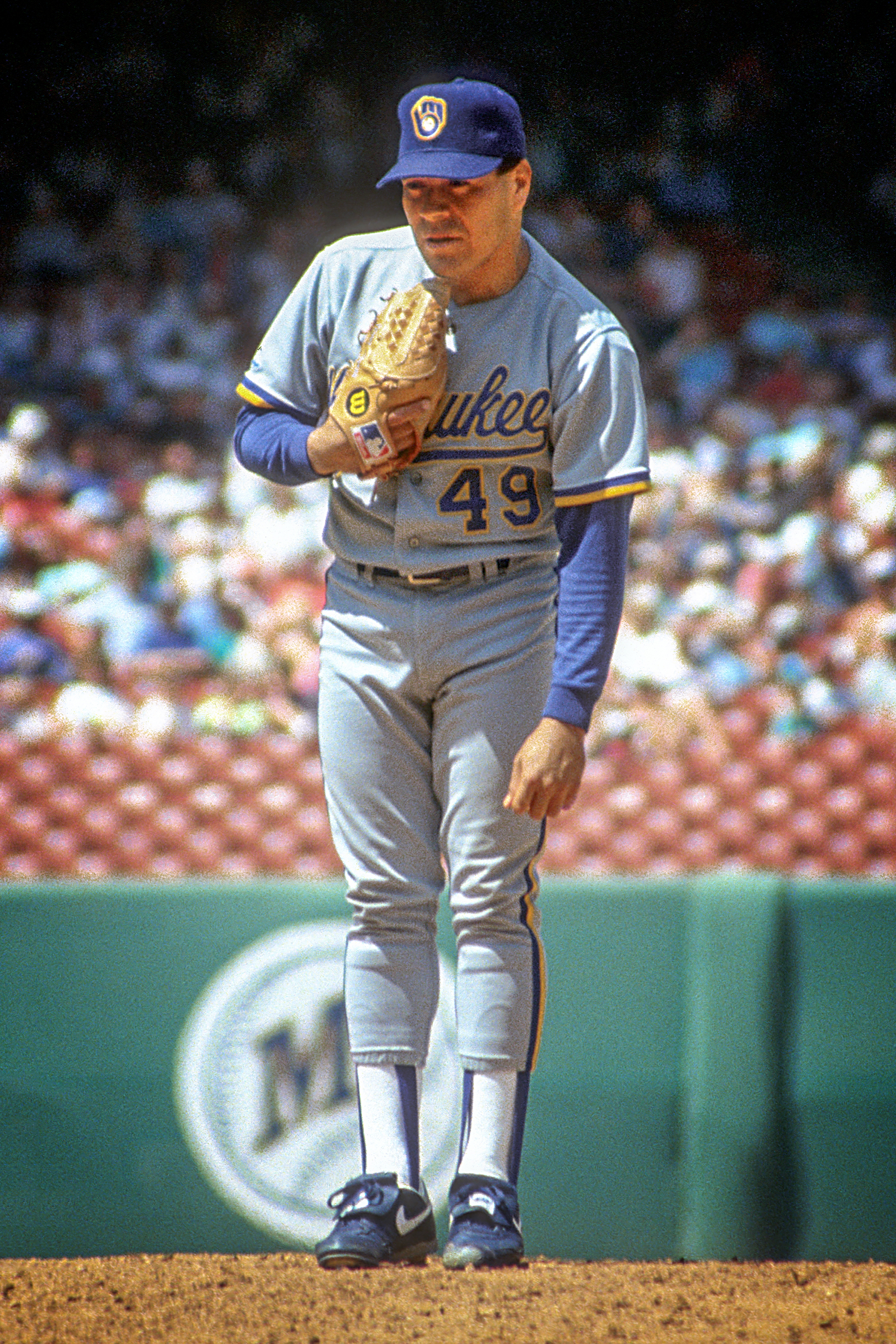
Teodoro Higuera, 1981 winner

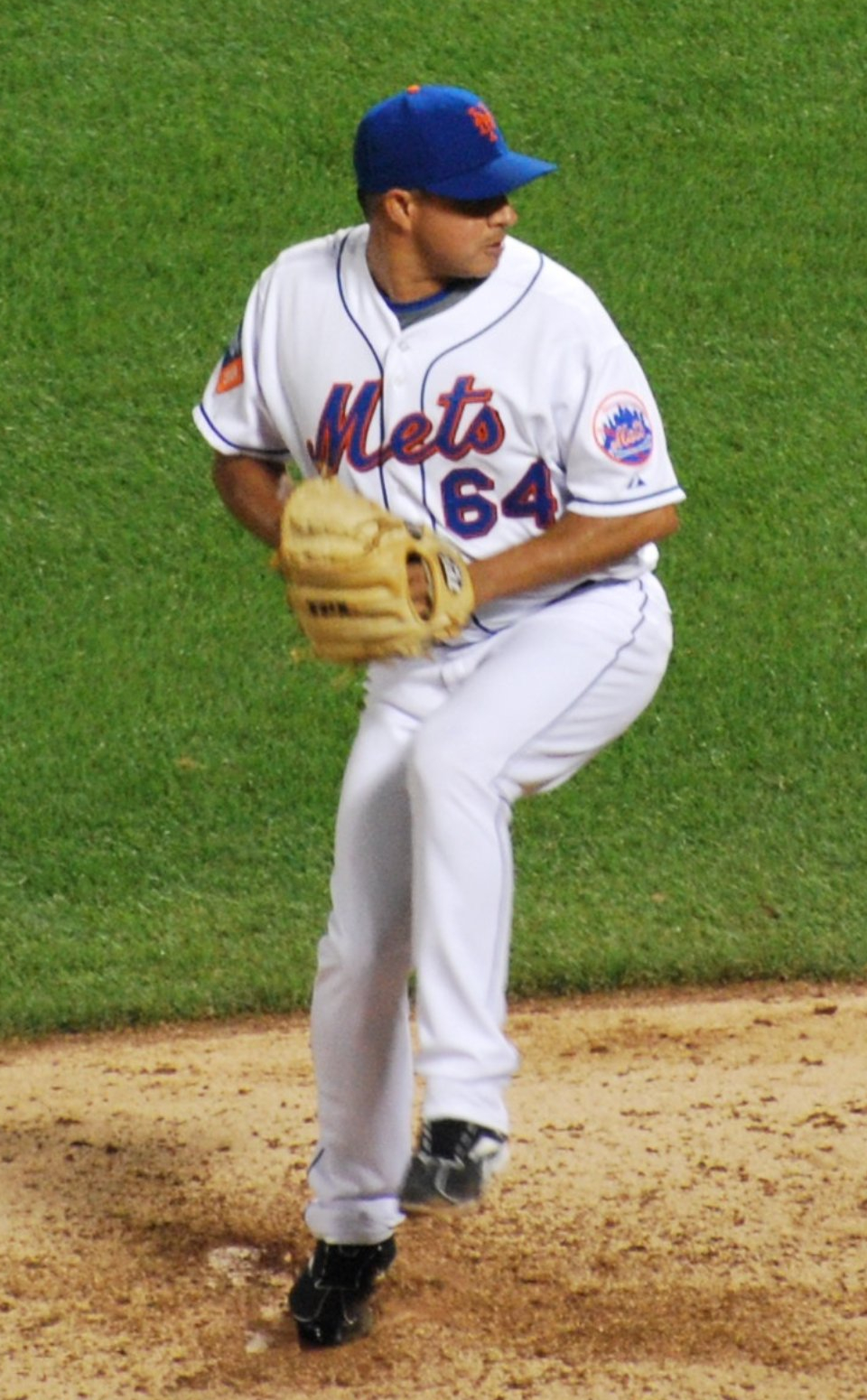
Elmer Dessens, 1994 winner

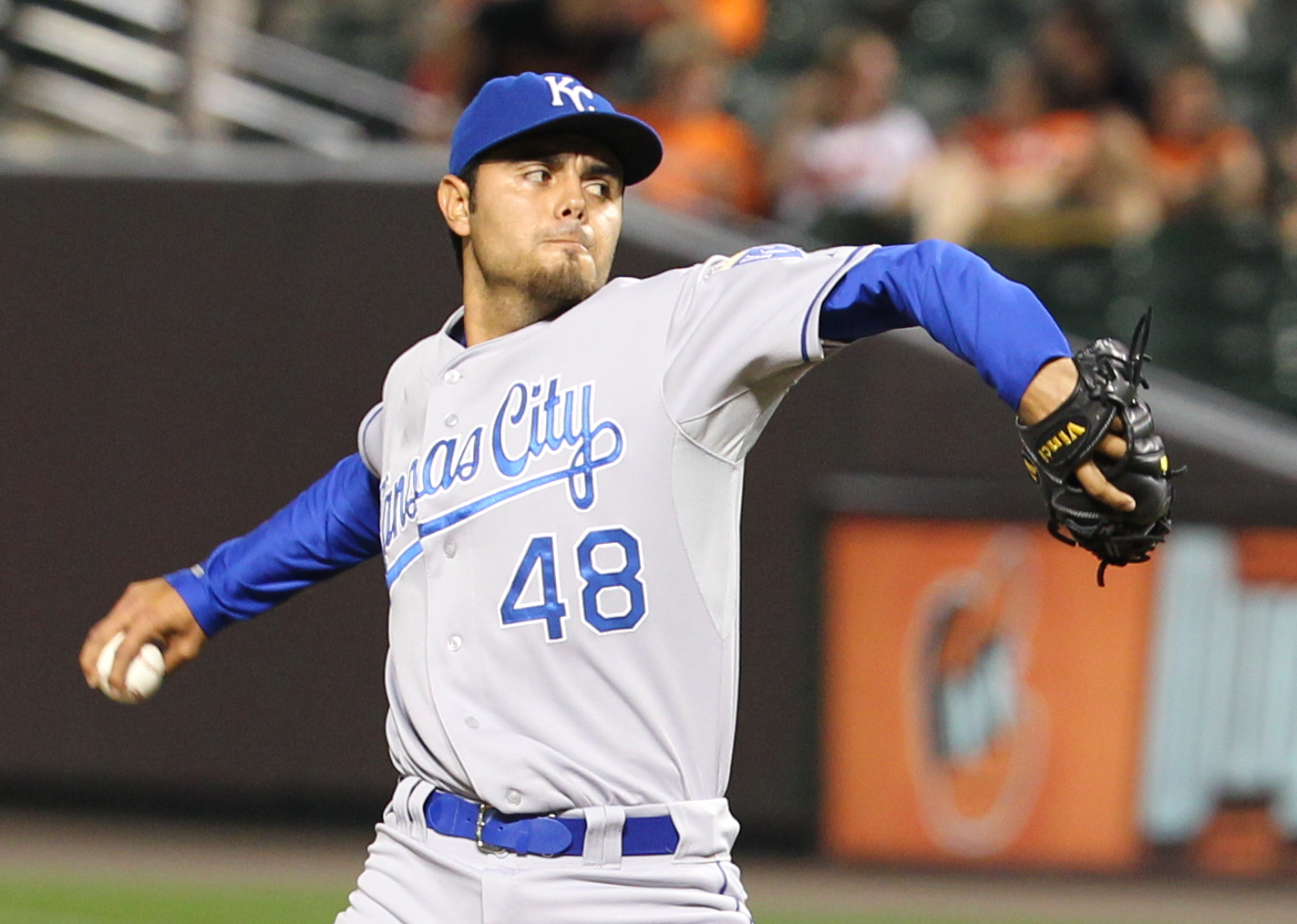
Joakim Soria, 2005 winner

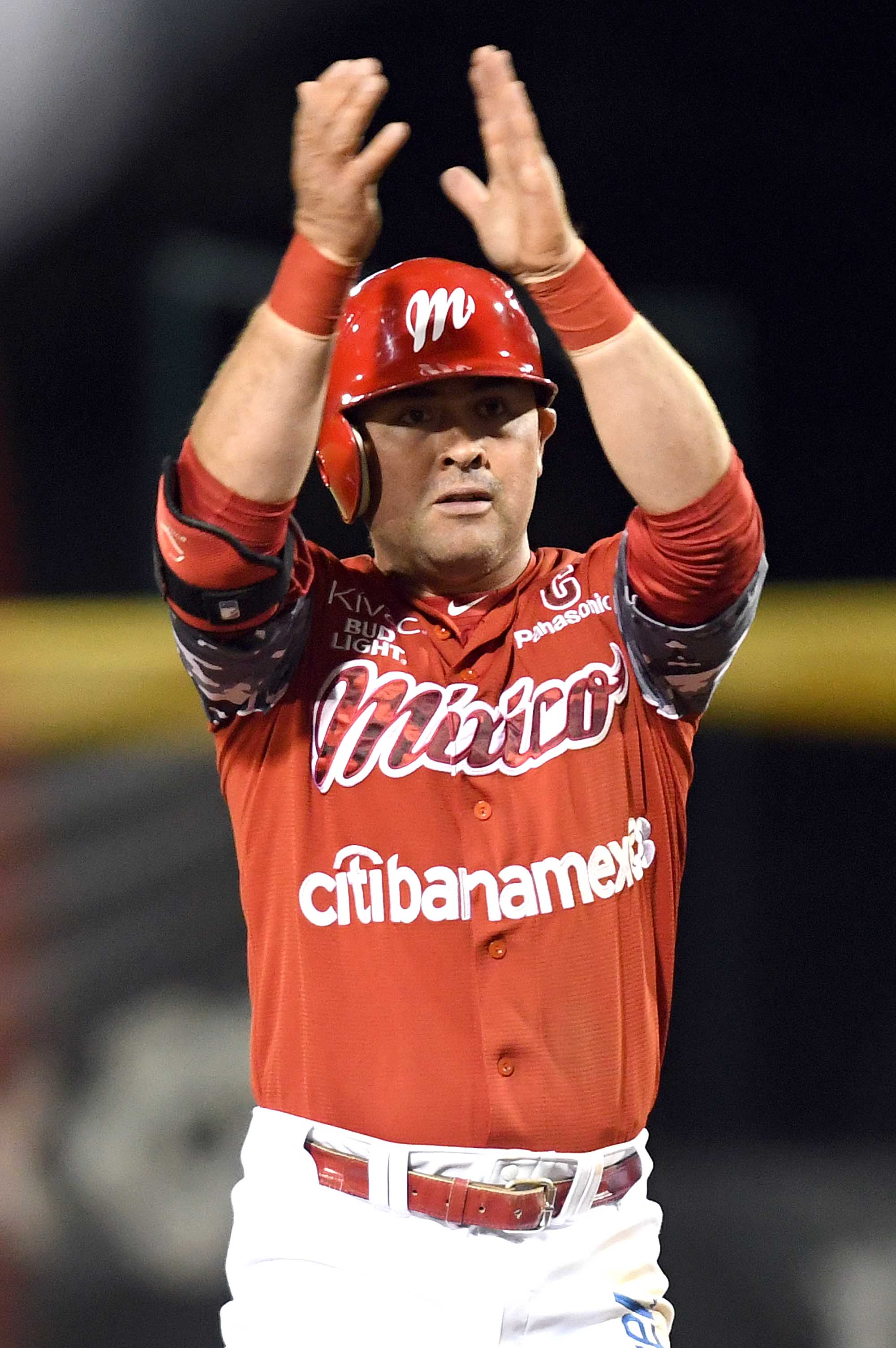
Iván Terrazas, 2006 winner

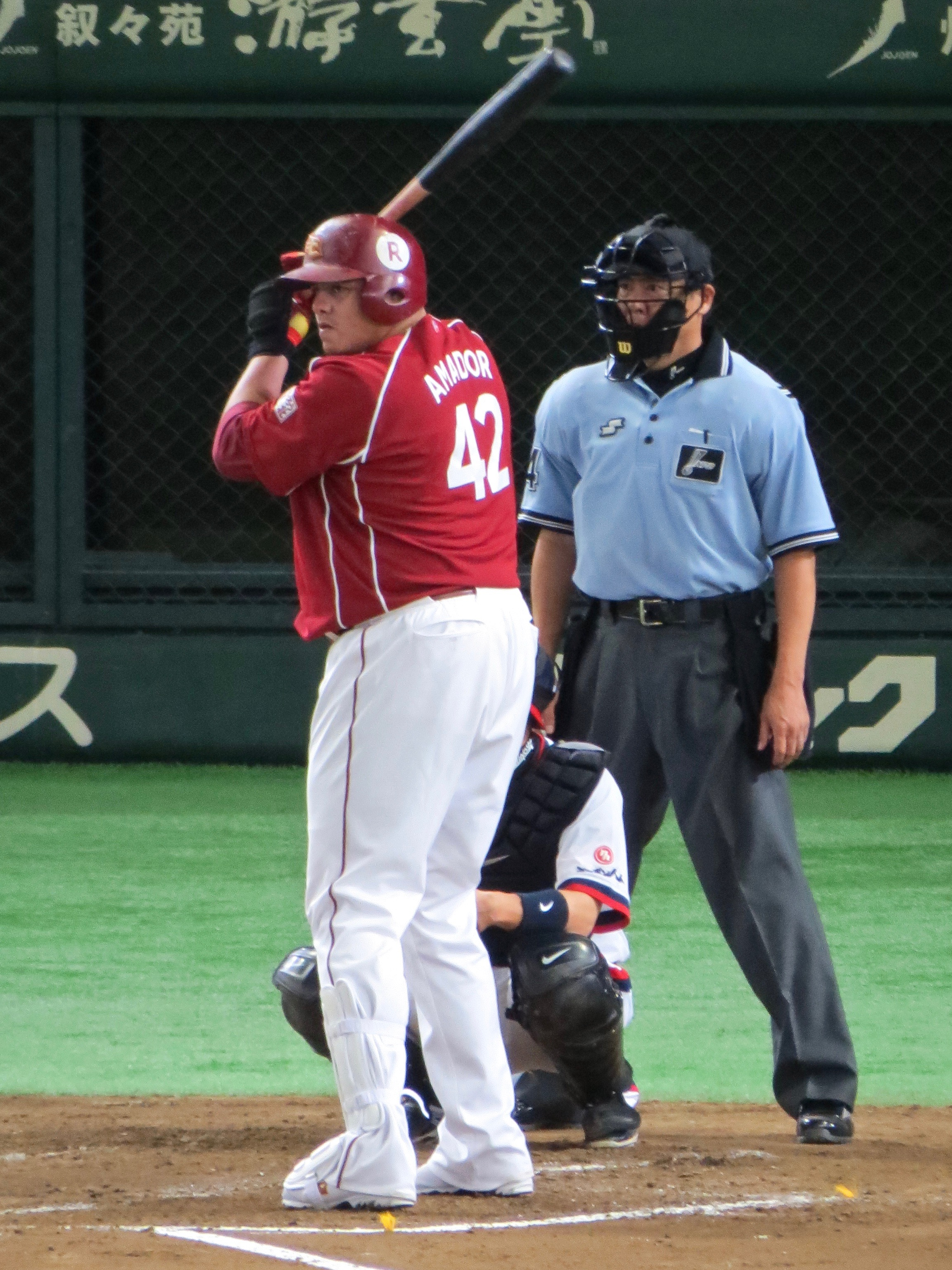
Japhet Amador, 2009 winner

Year	Player	Team	Position	Ref.
1937	Alfonso Nieto	Agricultura de México	Catcher	
1938	Ángel Castro^{†}	Alijadores de Tampico	Infielder	
1939	Epitacio Torres^{†}	Carta Blanca	Outfielder	
1940	Laureano Camacho	Azules de Veracruz	Catcher	
1941	Guillermo Garibay^{†}	Unión Laguna de Torreón	Outfielder	
1942	Jesús Díaz^{†}	Unión Laguna de Torreón	Outfielder	
1943	Beto Ávila^{†}	Pericos de Puebla	Outfielder	
1944	Jorge Bravo	Diablos Rojos del México	Infielder	
1945	Juan Conde	Pericos de Puebla	Pitcher	
1946	Guillermo Álvarez^{†}	Pericos de Puebla	Infielder	
1947	Tomás Arroyo^{†}	Alijadores de Tampico	Pitcher	
1948	Felipe Montemayor^{†}	Industriales de Monterrey	Outfielder	
1949	Leo Rodríguez^{†}	Unión Laguna de Torreón	Infielder	
1950	Francisco Ramírez^{†}	Tuneros de San Luis Potosí	Pitcher	
1951	Fernando García	Tuneros de San Luis Potosí	Outfielder	
1952	Jaime Abad	El Águila de Veracruz	Outfielder	
1953	Eduardo Serrano	Sultanes de Monterrey	Infielder	
1954	Alejandro Moreno	Tecolotes de Nuevo Laredo	Outfielder	
1955	Román Ramos	El Águila de Veracruz	Pitcher	
1956	Jess Durán	Tigres de México	Outfielder	
1957	Mario Luna	Diablos Rojos del México	Outfielder	
1958	Alberto Palafox	Diablos Rojos del México	Catcher	
1959	Ramón Arano^{†}	Petroleros de Poza Rica / El Águila de Veracruz	Pitcher	
1960	Mauro Ruiz	Tigres de México	Pitcher	
1961	Pablo Montes de Oca	El Águila de Veracruz	Pitcher	
1962	Héctor Espino^{†}	Sultanes de Monterrey	Infielder	
1963	Vicente Romo^{†}	Tigres de México	Pitcher	
1964	Elpidio Osuna^{†}	Petroleros de Poza Rica	Outfielder	
1965	Héctor Barnetche	Tigres de México	Outfielder	
1966	Abelardo Balderas	Diablos Rojos del México	Infielder	
1967	Francisco Maytorena^{†}	Broncos de Reynosa	Pitcher	
1968	Francisco Campos	Charros de Jalisco	Infielder	
1969	Luis Lagunas	Charros de Jalisco	Infielder	
1970	Ernesto Escárrega^{†}	Diablos Rojos del México	Pitcher	
1971	Miguel Suárez^{†}	Diablos Rojos del México	Outfielder	
1972	Rudy Hernández	Charros de Jalisco	Infielder	
1973	Francisco Barrios	Charros de Jalisco	Pitcher	
1974	Guadalupe Salinas	Broncos de Reynosa	Pitcher	
1975	Juan Martínez	Sultanes de Monterrey	Infielder	
1976	Houston Jiménez^{†}	Ángeles de Puebla	Infielder	
1977	Abraham Rivera	Ángeles de Puebla	Pitcher	
1978	Joel Pérez	Alacranes de Durango	Infielder	
1979	Fernando Valenzuela^{†}	Leones de Yucatán	Pitcher	
1980	Not awarded			
1981	Teodoro Higuera^{†}	Indios de Ciudad Juárez	Pitcher	
1982*	Matías Carrillo^{†}	Petroleros de Poza Rica	Outfielder	
1982*	Nelson Matus	Broncos de Reynosa	Pitcher	
1983*	Jesús Barrera	Tecolotes de Nuevo Laredo	Infielder	
1983*	Ramón Serna	Indios de Ciudad Juárez	Pitcher	
1984*	Carlos de los Santos	Cafeteros de Córdoba	Infielder	
1984*	Jesús Ríos^{†}	Tigres de México	Pitcher	
1985*	Pablo Machiria	Alijadores de Tampico	Outfielder	
1985*	Florentino Vázquez	Acereros de Monclova	Pitcher	
1986*	Lorenzo Retes	Tigres de México	Pitcher	
1986*	Eduardo Torres	Saraperos de Saltillo	Outfielder	
1987	Miguel Ángel Valencia	Tigres de México	Pitcher	
1988*	Andrés Cruz	Leones de Yucatán	Pitcher	
1988*	Marco Romero	Charros de Jalisco	Infielder	
1989	Germán Leyva	Acereros de Monclova	Pitcher	
1990*	David Sinohui	Bravos de León	Pitcher	
1990*	Lázaro Tiquet	Olmecas de Tabasco	Outfielder	
1991	Oscar Romero	Cafeteros de Córdoba	Infielder	
1992	Antonio Osuna	Tigres de México	Pitcher	
1993	Ismael Valdez	Tigres de México	Pitcher	
1994*	Elmer Dessens	Diablos Rojos del México	Pitcher	
1994*	Fernando Rodríguez	Algodoneros de Unión Laguna	Outfielder	
1995*	Bernardo Cuervo	Piratas de Campeche	Pitcher	
1995*	Raúl Páez	Diablos Rojos del México	Infielder	
1996	Francisco Campos	Piratas de Campeche	Pitcher	
1997	Erubiel Durazo	Sultanes de Monterrey	Infielder	
1998	Luis Mauricio Suárez	Tigres de México	Outfielder	
1999	Luis Carlos García	Tigres de México	Outfielder	
2000	Pablo Ortega	Tigres de México	Pitcher	
2001	Albino Contreras	Pericos de Puebla	Outfielder	
2002	Carlos Gastélum	Pericos de Puebla / Tigres de la Angelópolis	Infielder	
2003	Jesús Guzmán	Tigres de la Angelópolis	Pitcher	
2004	Santiago González^{^}	El Águila de Veracruz	Outfielder	
2005*	Julio Reyes	Vaqueros Laguna	Outfielder	
2005*	Joakim Soria	Diablos Rojos del México	Pitcher	
2006*	Salvador Robles	Diablos Rojos del México	Pitcher	
2006*	Iván Terrazas	Acereros de Monclova	Outfielder	
2007	Orlando Lara	Diablos Rojos del México	Pitcher	
2008	Alfredo Caudillo	Saraperos de Saltillo	Pitcher	
2009*	Japhet Amador^{^}	El Águila de Veracruz	Infielder	
2009*	Juan Pablo Oramas^{^}	Diablos Rojos del México	Pitcher	
2010	Héctor Velázquez	Piratas de Campeche	Pitcher	
2011	Alejandro Martínez	Petroleros de Minatitlán	Pitcher	
2012	Adrián Garza	Delfines del Carmen	Pitcher	
2013	Vanny Valenzuela	Delfines del Carmen	Pitcher	
2014	Carlos Figueroa^{^}	Diablos Rojos del México	Outfielder	
2015	Manuel Rodríguez^{^}	Leones de Yucatán	Pitcher	
2016	Isaac Rodríguez^{^}	Toros de Tijuana	Infielder	
2017	Ricky Rodríguez	Pericos de Puebla	Infielder	
2018	Romario Gil	Pericos de Puebla	Pitcher	
2019	Erick Migueles	Tigres de Quintana Roo	Outfielder	
2020	Not awarded. Season canceled due to the COVID-19 pandemic			
2021	Juan Carlos Camacho^{^}	Guerreros de Oaxaca	Catcher	
2022	Luis Márquez^{^}	El Águila de Veracruz	Pitcher	
2023	Randy Romero^{^}	Mariachis de Guadalajara	Outfielder	
2024	Denny Román^{^}	Sultanes de Monterrey	Pitcher	
2025	Juan Mora^{^}	Acereros de Monclova	Infielder	
2026	Amílcar Carreón^{^}	Acereros de Monclova	Pitcher	

=== Wins by team ===
Teams	Awards	Years
Tigres de México/Angelópolis/Quintana Roo	14	1956, 1960, 1963, 1965, 1984, 1986, 1987, 1992, 1993, 1998, 2000, 2002, 2003, 2019
Diablos Rojos del México	13	1944, 1957, 1958, 1966, 1970, 1971, 1994, 1995, 2005, 2006, 2007, 2009, 2014
Carta Blanca/Industriales de Monterrey/Sultanes de Monterrey	7	1939, 1948, 1953, 1962, 1975, 1997, 2024
Pericos de Puebla	7	1943, 1945, 1946, 2001, 2002, 2017, 2018
El Águila de Veracruz	7	1952, 1955, 1959, 1961, 2004, 2009, 2022
Unión Laguna de Torreón/Vaqueros Laguna/Algodoneros de Unión Laguna	5	1941, 1942, 1949, 1994, 2005
Charros de Jalisco	5	1968, 1969, 1972, 1973, 1988
Acereros de Monclova	5	1985, 1989, 2006, 2025, 2026
Alijadores de Tampico	3	1938, 1947, 1985
Petroleros de Poza Rica	3	1959, 1964, 1982
Broncos de Reynosa	3	1967, 1974, 1982
Leones de Yucatán	3	1979, 1988, 2015
Piratas de Campeche	3	1995, 1996, 2010
Tuneros de San Luis Potosí	2	1950, 1951
Tecolotes de Nuevo Laredo/Dos Laredos	2	1954, 1983
Ángeles de Puebla	2	1976, 1977
Indios de Ciudad Juárez	2	1981, 1983
Cafeteros de Córdoba	2	1984, 1991
Saraperos de Saltillo	2	1986, 2008
Delfines del Carmen	2	2012, 2013
Agricultura de México	1	1937
Azules de Veracruz	1	1940
Alacranes de Durango	1	1978
Bravos de León	1	1990
Olmecas de Tabasco	1	1990
Petroleros de Minatitlán	1	2011
Toros de Tijuana	1	2016
Guerreros de Oaxaca	1	2021
Mariachis de Guadalajara	1	2023
