= Laureano Camacho =

Mexican baseball player (1917–1976)

- Camacho with Unión Laguna
- Catcher / Second baseman
- Born: 28 August 1917; Empalme, Sonora, Mexico
- Died: 19 August 1976 (aged 58); Empalme, Sonora, Mexico
- Batted: Right Threw: Right
- Stats at Baseball Reference

Teams
- Azules de Veracruz (1940); Unión Laguna de Torreón (1942–1943); Tecolotes de Nuevo Laredo (1944); Unión Laguna de Torreón (1949–1953)

Career highlights and awards
- Mexican League Rookie of the Year (1940)

Laureano Camacho Cossío (28 August 1917 – 19 August 1976) nicknamed "Kiriki", was a Mexican professional baseball catcher and second baseman. Camacho played in the Mexican League (LMB) for nine seasons between 1940 and 1953, primarily for Unión Laguna de Torreón, where he is regarded as a club icon. He was widely considered the best catcher in the league during the 1940s and 1950s.

== Career ==
Camacho began his baseball career as a second baseman and pitcher before ultimately settling as catcher. He made his professional debut in the Mexican League (LMB) in 1940 playing for the Azules de Veracruz, where he earned the starting catcher position over Josh Gibson and formed a battery with Ramón Bragaña, Martín Dihigo and Barney Brown. That season, the Azules won the Mexican League championship and Camacho was named Rookie of the Year.

In 1942, Camacho joined Unión Laguna de Torreón and became a key figure during the club’s golden era. He was part of the squad that won the 1942 LMB championship, playing as second baseman under player-manager Martín Dihigo, who also played as a pitcher and a position player. In 1944 he was traded to the Tecolotes de Nuevo Laredo and after a four-season absence from professional play, he returned to Unión Laguna for the 1949 season.

In 1950, Unión Laguna won its second LMB title under manager Guillermo Garibay with Camacho as the starting catcher, having his best season, batting .313 with 43 RBI. He would go on to play three more seasons with Unión Laguna, retiring after the 1953 season.

Camacho died of cardiac arrest on 19 August 1976, aged 58.

== Career statistics ==
=== Mexican League ===
Season	Team	G	AB	R	H	2B	3B	HR	RBI	SB	BB	BA	SLG
1942	Torreón	73	247	41	74	17	1	0	44	1	23	.300	.377
1943	Torreón	86	310	36	84	18	1	4	49	4	35	.271	.374
1944	Nuevo Laredo	87	311	37	92	15	2	5	54	1	33	.296	.405
1949	Torreón	76	278	35	65	15	2	2	35	5	39	.234	.324
1950	Torreón	71	243	30	76	14	0	5	43	2	29	.313	.432
1951	Torreón	73	265	26	78	16	4	1	38	2	27	.294	.396
1952	Torreón	80	278	26	61	5	2	5	25	1	37	.219	.306
1953	Torreón	43	145	20	34	5	0	1	18	1	29	.234	.290
Total (8 seasons)		589	2077	251	564	105	12	23	306	17	252	.272	.367

Source: Enciclopedia del Beisbol Mexicano

== Personal life ==
Camacho was the uncle of Ronnie Camacho, whom he inspired to pursue baseball by giving him a glove that had been gifted to him by Martín Dihigo when both played for Unión Laguna.
