= 1950 Mexican Baseball League season =

- League: Mexican Baseball League
- Sport: Baseball
- Duration: 23 March – 9 October
- Teams: 8

Serie Final
- Champions: Unión Laguna de Torreón
- Runners-up: Charros de Jalisco

LMB seasons
- ← 1949 1951 →

The 1950 Mexican Baseball League season was the 26th season in the history of the Mexican Baseball League (LMB). It was contested by eight teams. The season started on 23 March with the inaugural match between Azules de Veracruz and Diablos Rojos del México at Parque Delta (with the ceremonial first pitch thrown by Olympic gold medalist equestrian Humberto Mariles) and finished on 9 October.

The season was contested in a split-season format, where the winner of each one of the two halves of the tournament faced each other in the Final Series to determine the champion.

Unión Laguna de Torreón won the first half with a 28–14 record, while Charros de Jalisco won the second half with a 26–16 record. Torreón defeated Jalisco 4 games to 2 in the championship series, led by manager Guillermo Garibay. The title was the second in franchise history for Unión Laguna de Torreón (and as of 2025, its last).

== Teams ==
Team	City	Stadium	Capacity	Manager
Azules de Veracruz	Mexico City	Parque Delta	25,000	(Cuba) Ramón Bragaña
Charros de Jalisco	Guadalajara, Jalisco	Estadio Municipal	15,000	(United States) Quincy Trouppe
Diablos Rojos del México	Mexico City	Parque Delta	25,000	(Mexico) Ernesto Carmona
Rojos del Águila de Veracruz	Veracruz, Veracruz	Parque Deportivo Veracruzano	12,000	(Cuba) Martín Dihigo
Sultanes de Monterrey	Monterrey, Nuevo León	Parque Cuauhtémoc	8,000	(Cuba) Lázaro Salazar
Tecolotes de Nuevo Laredo	Nuevo Laredo, Tamaulipas	Parque la Junta	5,000	(Mexico) Guillermo Ornelas
Tuneros de San Luis Potosí	San Luis Potosí, San Luis Potosí	Estadio 20 de Noviembre	6,500	(Mexico) Chile Gómez
Unión Laguna de Torreón	Torreón, Coahuila	Estadio de la Revolución	7,689	(Mexico) Guillermo Garibay

== Standings ==
First half standings
Pos	Team	W	L	Pct.	GB
1	Unión Laguna de Torreón	28	14	.667	—
2	Sultanes de Monterrey	26	16	.619	2.0
3	Charros de Jalisco	24	18	.571	4.0
4	Rojos del Águila de Veracruz	22	20	.524	6.0
5	Tuneros de San Luis Potosí	21	21	.500	7.0
6	Azules de Veracruz	18	24	.429	10.0
7	Diablos Rojos del México	15	27	.357	13.0
8	Tecolotes de Nuevo Laredo	14	28	.333	14.0

Second half standings
Pos	Team	W	L	Pct.	GB
1	Charros de Jalisco	26	16	.619	—
2	Diablos Rojos del México	23	19	.548	3.0
3	Rojos del Águila de Veracruz	23	19	.548	3.0
4	Tuneros de San Luis Potosí	22	20	.524	4.0
5	Sultanes de Monterrey	21	21	.500	5.0
6	Unión Laguna de Torreón	20	22	.476	6.0
7	Tecolotes de Nuevo Laredo	17	25	.405	9.0
8	Azules de Veracruz	16	26	.381	10.0

== Postseason ==
=== Final Series ===
Unión Laguna de Torreón won the series, 4–2.

Game	Date	Score	Location	Time	Attendance
1	3 October	Torreón – 0, Jalisco – 1	Estadio Municipal	-	-
2	4 October	Torreón – 6, Jalisco – 4	Estadio Municipal	2:35	-
3	6 October	Jalisco – 4, Torreón – 5	Estadio de la Revolución	-	-
4	7 October	Jalisco – 6, Torreón – 8	Estadio de la Revolución	-	-
5	8 October	Jalisco – 9, Torreón – 5	Parque Delta	-	-
6	9 October	Torreón – 12, Jalisco – 6	Parque Delta	-	-

== League leaders ==
Batting leaders
Stat	Player	Team	Total
AVG	(Cuba) Lorenzo Cabrera	México	.355
HR	(Mexico) Jesús Díaz	Torreón	10
HR	(Mexico) Ángel Castro	Azules	10
RBI	(Mexico) Ángel Castro	Azules	68
R	(Mexico) Epitacio Torres	Monterrey	70
H	(Cuba) Mario Ariosa	Águila	119
SB	(Cuba) Pedro Orta	Torreón	34

Pitching leaders
Stat	Player	Team	Total
ERA	(Cuba) Pedro Antúnez	Águila / Nuevo Laredo	1.87
W	(Mexico) Tomás Arroyo	Torreón	18
W	(Mexico) Guillermo López	Águila	18
K	(United States) Barney Brown	Torreón	157

== Notable events ==
One of the most infamous incidents in the history of the league occurred on 13 August at Parque Delta during a game between the Charros de Jalisco and Diablos Rojos del México. In the eighth inning, México pitcher Rufus Lewis hit Tribilín Cabrera with a pitch, prompting Cabrera to charge the mound and strike Lewis in the head with his bat. Lewis was knocked to the ground, and moments later México outfielder Bill Wright struck Cabrera with another bat during the ensuing brawl. Both players suffered head injuries and were taken to the hospital. México eventually won the game 11–10 in 12 innings, and Cabrera and Wright were later suspended.

== Awards ==
Award	Player	Team	Ref.
Rookie of the Year	(Mexico) Francisco Ramírez	San Luis Potosí	
