= Ángel Castro (first baseman) =

Mexican baseball player (1917–1983)

- First baseman
- Born: 20 April 1917; Empalme, Sonora, Mexico
- Died: 10 January 1983 (aged 65); Tampico, Tamaulipas, Mexico
- Batted: Left Threw: Left

LMB statistics
- Batting average: .306
- Hits: 1,914
- Home runs: 230
- Runs batted in: 1,219

Career highlights and awards
- Mexican League Rookie of the Year (1938); Mexican League Triple Crown (1951)

Member of the Mexican Professional

Baseball Hall of Fame
- Induction: 1964

Ángel Castro Pacheco (20 April 1917 – 10 January 1983) was a Mexican professional baseball first baseman. Castro spent twenty seasons playing in the Mexican League from 1938 to 1957. Castro was inducted into the Mexican Professional Baseball Hall of Fame as part of the class of 1964. Nicknamed, "el bateador elegante" (the elegant hitter), Castro is considered as one of the first Mexican baseball stars alongside Héctor Espino.

== Career ==
Castro was born on 20 April 1917 in Empalme, Sonora. He made his professional debut in the Mexican League in 1938 with the Alijadores de Tampico and won the Rookie of the Year Award. In 1939, Castro hit three home runs in a game, becoming the second player to do so in the Mexican League.

In 1940, Castro was traded to the Azules de Veracruz and in 1941, he returned to Tampico. Castro was part of the Tampico team that won the 1945 and 1946 Mexican League championship, under manager Armando Marsans.

In 1948, Castro was signed again by the Veracruz. 1951 was Castro's best season, he won the triple crown, compiling a batting average of .357, 22 home runs and 79 RBIs.

Castro later played for the Tuneros de San Luis Potosí, Diablos Rojos del México, Sultanes de Monterrey, Tigres de México, Tecolotes de Nuevo Laredo and Rojos del Águila de Veracruz. He retired after the 1957 season.

In 1964, Castro was elected to the Mexican Professional Baseball Hall of Fame together with Martín Dihigo, Epitacio Torres, Lázaro Salazar, Ramón Bragaña and Genaro Casas.

== Death ==
Castro spent his last years working for the Mexican Social Security Institute in Tampico. He died on 10 January 1983 in Tampico, aged 65.
