= Epitacio Torres =

Mexican baseball player and manager

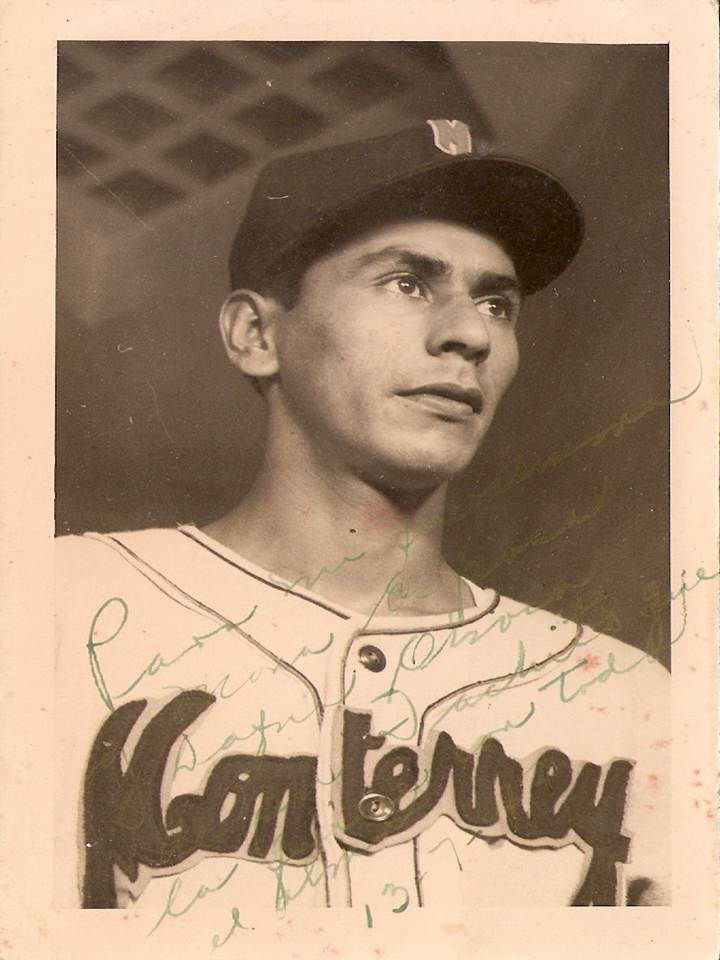
- Outfielder / Manager
- Born: 19 September 1921; Villaldama, Nuevo León, Mexico
- Died: 21 April 1971 (aged 49); Monterrey, Nuevo León, Mexico
- Batted: Left Threw: Left

Teams
- Carta Blanca / Industriales de Monterrey / Sultanes de Monterrey (1939–1956); Tecolotes de Nuevo Laredo (1957)

Career highlights and awards
- Mexican League Rookie of the Year (1939); Sultanes de Monterrey #7 retired

Member of the Mexican Professional

Baseball Hall of Fame
- Induction: 1964

Torres' number 7 was retired by the Sultanes de Monterrey

Epitacio "La Mala" Torres Herrera (19 September 1921 – 21 April 1971) was a Mexican professional baseball outfielder and manager. Torres spent 19 seasons playing in the Mexican League (LMB), most of them with Monterrey as right fielder, considered as one of the best players in his position in the LMB's history. He was the first player to accumulate 1000 hits in the Mexican League in 1947 and was enshrined into the Mexican Professional Baseball Hall of Fame in 1964.

== Career ==
Torres was born on 19 September 1921 in Villaldama, Nuevo León, Mexico. He debuted in the Mexican League in 1939, aged 17, with Carta Blanca de Monterrey under manager Guillermo Ornelas, who spotted him playing with a local amateur team from Monterrey, Cuauhtémoc-Cidosa, and invited him to play professionally. He played his first professional game with Carta Blanca against the Cafeteros de Córdoba. "La Mala," nicknamed for his similar playing style to Salvador Malacara, won the 1939 Mexican League Rookie of the Year Award.

In 1943, Lázaro Salazar was appointed manager of the Industriales de Monterrey (the team changed its name from Carta Blanca to Industriales in 1942). With Salazar, Monterrey won four Mexican League championships in 1943, 1947, 1948 and 1949; Torres was a key player for the team as the first bat for the Industriales, later known as Sultanes since 1948.

He played in the Cuban League for the Tigres de Marianao during the 1943–44 season. In 183 at bats he recorded 27 runs, 49 hits, 14 RBIs and an average of .268.

On 12 September 1947, Torres achieved his 1000th career hit in a game against the Diablos Rojos del México at Parque Delta, becoming the first player to do so in the history of the Mexican League. Torres' teammate, Agustín Bejerano, had 999 hits while La Mala was three hits short of the thousand mark. Bejerano was the favorite; however, Torres batted three hits against México's pitcher Fred Martin, achieving the feat.

In 1955, while still a player, he was appointed as manager of the Sultanes after the departure of Lázaro Salazar. He led the team to fifth-place finishes in 1955 and 1956. In 1957 he was transferred to the Tecolotes de Nuevo Laredo. He also played for the San Antonio Missions of the Texas League in 1957. Torres retired after the 1957 season.

Torres died on 21 April 1971 in Monterrey due to complications from lung cancer, aged 49.

== Legacy ==
Torres was inducted into the Mexican Professional Baseball Hall of Fame as part of the class of 1964, alongside Ángel Castro, Martín Dihigo, Lázaro Salazar, Ramón Bragaña and Genaro Casas.

His two sons, Héctor and Ricardo, were also baseball players. Héctor, nicknamed "La Malita" in honor of his father, played in Major League Baseball for nine seasons between 1968 and 1977, with the Houston Astros, Chicago Cubs, Montreal Expos, San Diego Padres and Toronto Blue Jays. Ricardo played from 1967 to 1971 in the Mexican League with Monterrey and Alijadores de Tampico.

On 16 May 1994, the Sultanes de Monterrey officially retired Torres' number 7. Venados de Mazatlán also retired Torres' number 7.

== Career statistics ==
=== Cuban League ===
Season	Team	G	AB	R	H	2B	3B	HR	RBI	SB	BA
1943–44	Marianao		183	27	49	4	4	0	14	1	.268
Total			183	27	49	4	4	0	14	1	.268

== Managerial statistics ==
=== Mexican League ===
Year	Team	Regular season						Postseason			
Year	Team	Games	Won	Lost	Tied	Pct.	Finish	Won	Lost	Pct.	Notes
1955	Sultanes de Monterrey	100	46	54	0	.460	5th	–	–	–	–
1956	Sultanes de Monterrey	120	51	69	0	.425	5th	–	–	–	–
Total		220	97	123	0	.441					
