= Iván Terrazas =

Mexican baseball player (born 1983)

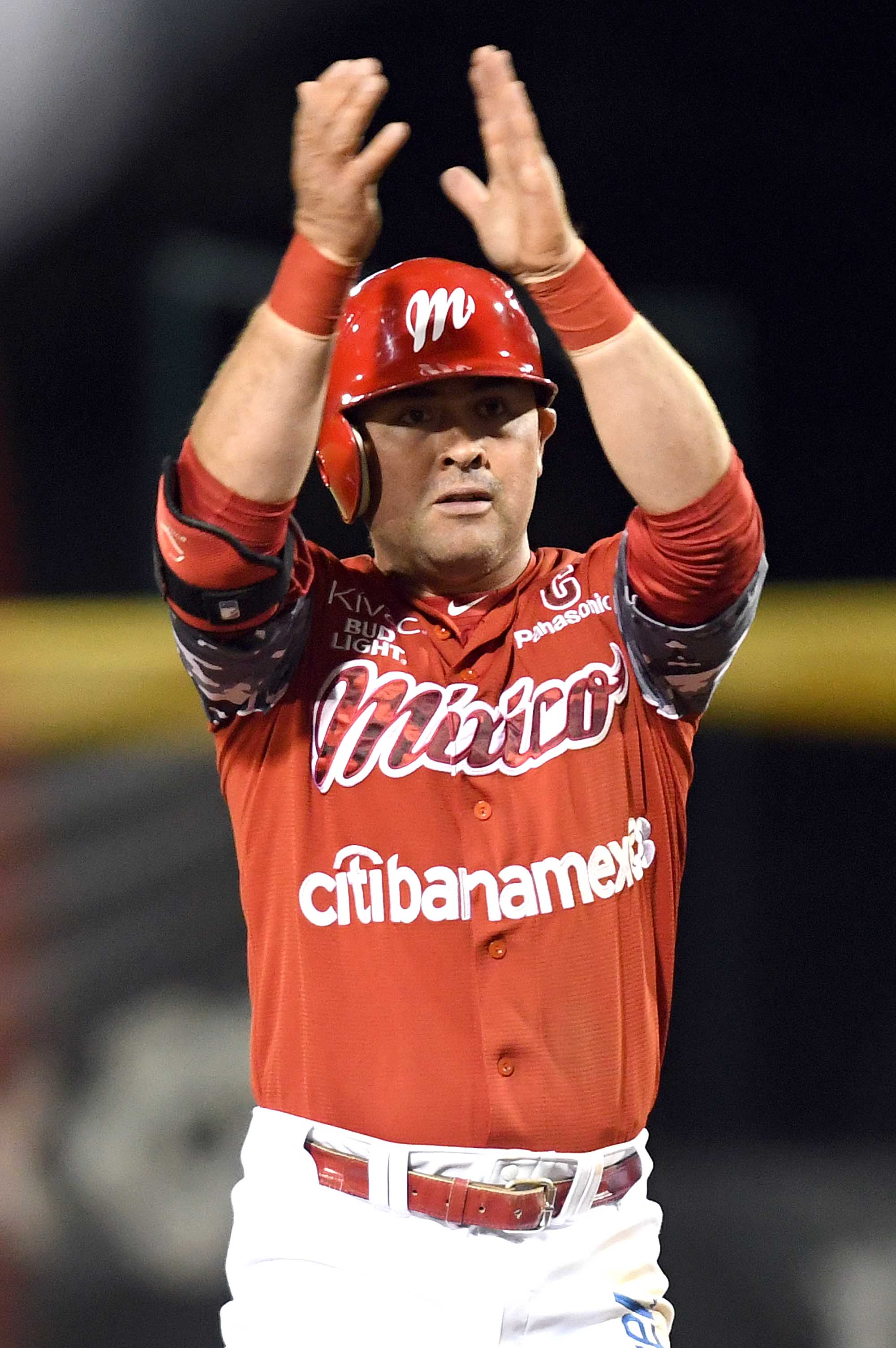
- Terrazas in 2018

Diablos Rojos del México
- Outfielder / General manager
- Born: 11 November 1983 (age 42); Mexico City, Mexico
- Bats: Left Throws: Right

LMB statistics (through 2022 season)
- Batting average: .331
- Home runs: 115
- Runs batted in: 689
- Stolen bases: 61

Teams
- Acereros de Monclova (2006–2007); Diablos Rojos del México (2008–2022)

Career highlights and awards
- Mexican League Rookie of the Year (2006)
Medals
Men's baseball
Representing Mexico
Pan American Games
Bronze medal – third place	2007 Rio de Janeiro	Team

Iván Martín Terrazas Magaña (born 11 November 1983) is a Mexican former professional baseball outfielder and current general manager of the Diablos Rojos del México baseball and softball teams. After playing in the Atlanta Braves minor league system for six years, Terrazas spent sixteen seasons in the Mexican League (LMB), fourteen of them with the Diablos Rojos del México, where he retired after playing a single game in 2022.

Terrazas represented Mexico, winning the bronze medal at the 2007 Pan American Games.

== Early life ==
Terrazas was born on 11 November 1982 in Mexico City. His father, Martín Terrazas, played professional baseball in the Mexican League during eight seasons (from 1973 to 1980) as a catcher, spending most of his career with the Tigres de México. Iván started playing baseball in the Liga Tranviarios, a youth baseball league in Mexico City.

== Professional career ==
=== Atlanta Braves ===
Terrazas was signed by the Atlanta Braves organization in 2002 and was assigned to the Dominican Summer League Braves, where he played during 2002 and 2003. In 2004, he was promoted to the Gulf Coast League Braves where he batted .282/.312/.462 with four home runs and 20 RBI in 37 games. In 2005, he played for the Rome Braves of the High-A South Atlantic League, hitting .277/.299/.365 with three home runs and 41 RBI.

=== Acereros de Monclova ===
In 2006, Terrazas was signed by the Acereros de Monclova of the Mexican League (LMB). He batted .338/.387 /.545 with 30 doubles, 80 runs, 13 home runs and 53 RBI in 94 games. That year he also appeared in 16 games for the Mississippi Braves and in ten games for the Myrtle Beach Pelicans. Terrazas won the 2006 Mexican League Rookie of the Year Award, sharing the honor with Salvador Robles, pitcher for the Diablos Rojos del México.

In 2007, Terrazas appeared in 73 games with the Acereros, batting .304/.349/.496 with 82 hits, 44 RBI and nine home runs. He also played five games with the Myrtle Beach Pelicans, hitting .200/.250/.200. At the end of the season, Terrazas was released by the Braves and subsequently signed with the Diablos Rojos del México.

=== Diablos Rojos del México ===
In the first game of the 2008 season, in his first turn at bat with the Diablos, Terrazas hit a home run that allowed Daniel Fernández to score his 1,837th career run, which turned out to be his last, as he retired after the game.

He finished the 2008 season recording a .325 batting average with 109 hits, eight home runs, and 50 RBI in 335 at bats across 95 games. That year, the Diablos Rojos won the Mexican League championship after defeating the Sultanes de Monterrey 4–1 in the championship series. From 2008 to 2018, with the exception of 2013 when he was injured, Terrazas maintained a batting average over .300 each year.

In 2014, the Diablos won the North Division of the Mexican League and faced the Pericos de Puebla in the Serie del Rey, the LMB championship series. The Diablos swept the Pericos in four games, securing the sixteenth title in the franchise's history. That year, Terrazas batted .325/.375/.447 with 98 hits, 17 doubles, six home runs and 38 RBI in 84 games. In 2015, Terrazas was chosen as the team's captain. In 2016, he recorded his 1000th career hit.

Terrazas announced his retirement on 12 April 2022, prior to the beginning of the 2022 season. He played his last game with the Diablos Rojos on 26 April, where el México defeated the Mariachis de Guadalajara. During the game, his 996th professional appearance, he hit his 1,140th career hit and scored his 575th run.

== International career ==
Terrazas was selected to represent Mexico at the 2007 Pan American Games, where the team won the bronze medal. He appeared in four games, recording three hits, six runs, one RBI and a .333 batting average.

He also participated in the 2009 Baseball World Cup, appearing in eight games and recording four runs, eight hits, six RBI, two home runs, and a .320 batting average over 25 at bats.

== Post-retirement ==
In February 2024, Terrazas received the Medal of Sporting Merit from the Congress of Mexico City alongside Randy Arozarena and footballer José Luis López.
