= Tomás Arroyo =

Mexican baseball player & coach (1921–1993)

- Pitcher / Coach
- Born: 19 September 1921; Monterrey, Nuevo León, Mexico
- Died: 27 May 1993 (aged 66); Culiacán, Sinaloa, Mexico
- Batted: Right Threw: Right

Teams
- Alijadores de Tampico (1946–1948); Azules de Veracruz (1948); Unión Laguna de Torreón (1949–1953); Tecolotes de Nuevo Laredo (1954–1958); Leones de Yucatán (1958); El Águila de Veracruz (1959)

Career highlights and awards
- Mexican League Rookie of the Year (1947)

Member of the Mexican Professional

Baseball Hall of Fame
- Induction: 1981

Tomás Arroyo Valladares (19 September 1921 – 27 May 1993) was a Mexican professional baseball pitcher and coach. Arroyo played 13 seasons in the Mexican League and 14 seasons for the Tomateros de Culiacán in the Mexican Pacific League, then known as Liga de la Costa del Pacífico (Pacific Coast League). He was inducted into the Mexican Professional Baseball Hall of Fame in 1981.

== Career ==
Arroyo was born on 19 September 1921 in Monterrey, Nuevo León. He made his professional debut in the Mexican League in 1946 with the Alijadores de Tampico. The next year, he played in 41 games and posted a 3.95 ERA, winning the Rookie of the Year Award. In 1948 he was the winning pitcher of the Mexican League All Star Game played in Parque Delta, where the Mexicans defeated the Foreigners 3–2.

He briefly played for the Azules de Veracruz in 1948. In 1949 he joined Unión Laguna de Torreón and in 1950 he helped the team win the 1950 Mexican League championship posting 18 wins. In 1954 he played six games with the Tampa Smokers of the Florida International League. Later, he was signed by the Tecolotes de Nuevo Laredo. In 1958 he played with the Leones de Yucatán and in 1959 with El Águila de Veracruz. He also played 14 seasons in the Liga de la Costa del Pacífico for the Tomateros de Culiacán.

After his retirement as a player, he settled in Culiacán. In November 1969, he began working as a coach for the baseball team of the Autonomous University of Sinaloa (UAS), transforming the program into a collegiate powerhouse. He stepped down in 1992.

Arroyo died on 27 May 1993 in Culiacán, aged 66.

== Legacy ==
Arroyo was enshrined into the Mexican Professional Baseball Hall of Fame as part of the class of 1981, alongside Chico García, Apolinar Pulido and umpire Salvador Castro.

One of the baseball fields of the Autonomous University of Sinaloa, with a capacity of 1000 seated spectators, is named in honor of Arroyo.
