= Andrés Ayón =

Cuban baseball player (1936–2021)

- Ayón with the Saraperos de Saltillo
- Pitcher / Manager
- Born: 22 October 1936; Havana, Cuba
- Died: 24 October 2021 (aged 85); Havana, Cuba
- Batted: Right Threw: Righjt

Member of the Mexican Professional

Baseball Hall of Fame
- Induction: 1997

Andrés Ayón Brown (October 22, 1936 – October 24, 2021) was a Cuban professional baseball player and manager. He played extensively in the Mexican Baseball League and in minor league baseball, and later managed Industriales in the Cuban National Series (SNB). He is notable for being one of the only Cuban players signed to a professional contract to remain on the island after the Cuban Revolution.

== Playing career ==
Ayón played youth baseball in Cuba and appeared with the Cuban national team at the 1956 World Junior Championships in Mexico City. He was signed to a minor league contract with the Cincinnati Redlegs by scout Napoleon Reyes. As part of the Redlegs (Reds) organization, he made appearances in the Northern League in 1957 and the California League in 1958.

In the Cuban Winter League, he played with the Tigres de Marianao team that carried the 1958 championship, pitching a scoreless eighth inning in the decisive game against Almendares; Marianao would go on to win the 1958 Caribbean Series in Puerto Rico. In 1959, he debuted with the Havana Sugar Kings of the Triple-A International League (though he spent most of the year with Class B Topeka). Ayón returned to Havana in 1960 and worked to a 3.00 earned run average over 52 games, though geopolitical tensions stemming from the Cuban Revolution forced the midseason move of the team to Jersey City.

In 1964, Ayón made his Mexican Baseball League debut with the Pericos de Puebla, fresh off a championship win. Under Cuban manager Tony Castaño, and as part of a rotation with Miguel Sotelo, Julio Moreno, and Florentino Rivera, Ayón finished the year with a 16-5 record, a 2.94 earned run average, and 106 strikeouts.

Over the course of his 14-year Mexican League career, Ayón had several accomplishments, chief among them a no-hitter with Puebla in a game against the Charros de Jalisco on June 25, 1966, and a perfect game (the second in LMB history) on June 30, 1972, in a seven-inning game with the Saraperos de Saltillo against the Sultanes de Monterrey.

Despite a strong three years with Puebla — compiling a 49–29 records with 337 strikeouts — Ayón was traded to Jalisco for the 1967 season. He worked to a 25–6 record and a 3.34 ERA to bring the team its first LMB championship. The following year, he posted a 13-13 record, though his 1969 was much improved, with a 20–12 records and a 2.57 ERA. (He also appeared in a single game for the Triple-A Seattle Angels of the Pacific Coast League, allowing three hits in an inning of work.) In 1971, he was drafted by the expansion Piratas de Sabinas, though he would be traded to the Saraperos de Saltillo and finish the season with a 1.22 ERA. He pitched 147 innings that year, one less than the qualified minimum (148), but the league awarded him the title because Ayon he would have had to allow 14 runs in that one inning to finish in second place. He was traded back to Puebla in the 1973 season, and would go on to play with the Cafeteros de Córdoba (1975) and the Tecolotes de Nuevo Laredo (1976-1977).

Ayón was the first pitcher in LMB history to post three or more 20-win seasons (and as of 2021, the only one to do so). He led the league in win-loss record three times, tying Martín Dihigo and Ramón Arano.

In the Mexican Pacific League (LMP), Ayón played several seasons with the Tomateros de Culiacán. He won the LMP's award for Most Valuable Player during the 1966–67 season.

== Post-playing career ==
Ayón returned to Cuba, and was appointed manager of Havana-based Industriales in the 1982–83 season; his first season, he finished in fourth place with a 31–16 record. In the 1983–84 season, the team moved up to second place with 49–25, 2½ games behind champions Citricultores. The following season, the team finished sixth at 44–31.

That would be Ayón's last year at the helm of Industriales; he later said he quit due to disagreements over the selection of the Cuban national team managers and players. His record as manager was 124-72.

He was inducted into the Mexican Professional Baseball Hall of Fame in 1997, along with player Maximino León, journalist Alfonso Araujo, and umpire Víctor Saiz. However, Ayón later said the honor was ignored by the Baseball Federation of Cuba.

Nevertheless, Ayón remained active in Cuban baseball into his later life, working to promote youth baseball as vice president of the Consejo Nacional Martiano. His nephew, Pedro Medina, was a longtime catcher with Las Villas of the Cuban National Series and the Cuban national team; Medina would follow in his uncle's footsteps as manager of Industriales. Ayón died of a heart attack on October 24, 2021 in Havana.
