= 1946 Mexican Baseball League season =

1946 Mexican League season
- League: Mexican League
- Sport: Baseball
- Teams: 8
- Season champions: Alijadores de Tampico

LMB seasons
- ← 1945 1947 →

The 1946 Mexican League season was the 22nd season in the history of the Mexican League (LMB). It was contested by eight teams. Alijadores de Tampico won their second consecutive title, finishing with a records of 56 wins and 41 losses, beating the runners-up, Diablos Rojos del México, by one game.

This season was notable due to the conflict between the Mexican League, in its first year under president Jorge Pasquel, and Major League Baseball (MLB). Pasquel attempted to lure major league players to Mexico by offering higher wages, earning the ire of MLB Commissioner Happy Chandler, as the Mexican League existed outside so-called "organized baseball." 22 major leaguers ended up defecting, or "jumping", to the Mexican League, though these players would be banned from playing in MLB-affiliated ball under Chandler's orders.

== Conflict with Major League Baseball ==
Before 1946, the Mexican League drew top-level American talent from the Negro leagues, ranging from established stars like Willie Wells and Josh Gibson, as well as future prospects like Monte Irvin; as African-Americans, these players were barred from playing in Major League Baseball. However, after World War II, the league sought to recruit players from MLB itself, largely thanks to the efforts of Jorge Pasquel, owner of the Azules de Veracruz and the league's new president. The first player committing to play in Mexico was Danny Gardella, an outfielder with the New York Giants. Gardella signed an offer with Veracruz worth $3,000 more than what he would be paid in the majors. Eventually, 21 other players followed Gardella, including Sal Maglie, Max Lanier, and Alejandro Carrasquel (though some returned home soon after defecting).

Commissioner of Baseball Happy Chandler drew a clear line between "organized baseball," i.e. the minor leagues under the authority of the Commissioner, and the independent Mexican League, which was labeled an "outlaw league." Pasquel offered to acquiesce to Chandler's authority providing that the Mexican League was recognized as a "major league" on par with MLB, but this was rejected. On April 1, Opening Day of the 1946 MLB season, Chandler announced that any player who had "jumped" to Mexico would be banned for five years from playing in MLB-affiliated baseball. Other MLB owners like Yankees owner Larry MacPhail took legal action to prevent their players from defecting to Mexico.

Most of the "jumpers" signed with clubs owned by Pasquel and his brothers: the Azules de Veracruz (10) and the Diablos Rojos del México (3). (Note: Alex Carrasquel and Luis Olmo played with both Veracruz and México in 1946.) Torreón, Nuevo Laredo, and Puebla signed three each, while eventual league champion Tampico signed only one, Moe Franklin. However, many of them found it difficult to adjust to the Mexican League; Veracruz catcher Mickey Owen ended up returning to the United States partway through the season, only to find that Chandler's suspension wasn't a bluff.

Pasquel's efforts to lure top-level major league talent to Mexico were unsuccessful, as star players like Ted Williams and Stan Musial rebuffed his offers. Most of the MLB players that did "jump" to Mexico did not substantially improve their teams' performance, and Pasquel's own Azules de Veracruz, with 11 of the defectors, limped to a dismal, second-to-last place finish. Going into the 1947 season, Pasquel announced that he would no longer "raid" players signed to MLB contracts.

The conflict with MLB had ramifications beyond the Mexican League; after the 1946 season, Gardella eventually sued Major League Baseball on antitrust grounds, in what would be the biggest challenge to baseball's reserve clause since the 1920s. Chandler, faced with the prospect of a court striking down baseball's antitrust exemption, lifted the suspension of the jumpers in 1949.

== Standings ==
Regular season standings
Pos	Team	W	L	Pct.	GB
1	Alijadores de Tampico	56	41	.577	—
2	Rojos del México	55	42	.567	1.0
3	Pericos de Puebla	52	46	.531	4.5
4	Unión Laguna de Torreón	50	47	.515	6.0
5	Industriales de Monterrey	48	49	.495	8.0
6	La Junta de Nuevo Laredo	48	50	.490	8.5
7	Azules de Veracruz	41	57	.418	15.5
8	Tuneros de San Luis Potosí	40	58	.408	16.5

== League leaders ==
Batting leaders
Stat	Player	Team	Total
AVG	(Cuba) Claro Duany	Monterrey	.364
HR	(Cuba) Roberto Ortiz	México	25
RBI	(Cuba) Pedro Pagés	Puebla	83
RBI	(Cuba) Roberto Ortiz	México	83
R	(Cuba) Roberto Ortiz	México	108
H	(Cuba) Napoleón Reyes	Puebla	140
SB	(Cuba) Agustín Bejerano	Nuevo Laredo	47

Pitching leaders
Stat	Player	Team	Total
ERA	(United States) Max Lanier	Azules	1.93
W	(Cuba) Agapito Mayor	Nuevo Laredo	20
W	(United States) Sal Maglie	Puebla	20
K	(United States) Booker McDaniel	San Luis Potosí	232

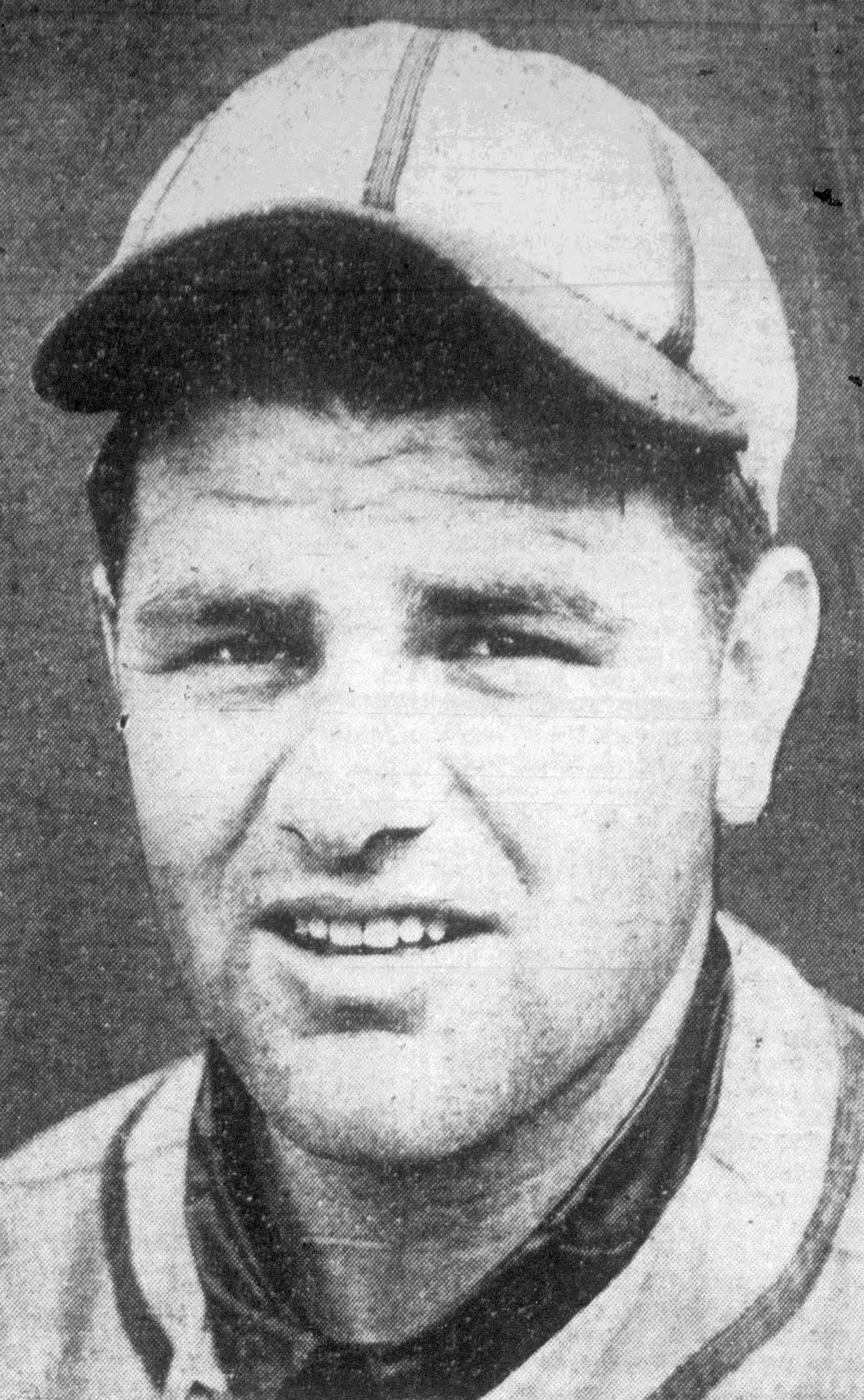
Max Lanier, one of the MLB "jumpers" took the ERA title in 1946

== Milestones ==
=== Batters ===
- Agustín Bejerano (Nuevo Laredo): Bejerano set the Mexican League record for stolen bases, with 47; this record would later be broken by Francisco García in 1966.

== Awards ==
Award	Player	Team	Ref.
Rookie of the Year	(Mexico) Guillermo Álvarez	Puebla	

== Bibliography ==
- McKelvey, G. Richard (2006). Mexican Raiders in the Major Leagues: The Pasquel Brothers Vs. Organized Baseball, 1946. McFarland. ISBN 9780786425631.
