= Guillermo Garibay =

Mexican baseball player and coach

- Outfielder / Catcher / Manager
- Born: 6 June 1921; Torreón, Coahuila, Mexico
- Died: 17 October 1996 (aged 75); Torreón, Coahuila, Mexico
- Batted: Right Threw: Right

Career highlights and awards
- Mexican League Rookie of the Year (1941)

Member of the Mexican Professional

Baseball Hall of Fame
- Induction: 1977

Guillermo "Memo" Garibay Fernández (6 June 1921 – 17 October 1996) was a Mexican professional baseball outfielder, catcher and manager. Garibay played for seven seasons in the Mexican League, making his debut with Unión Laguna de Torreón in 1941. In 1949, he was hired as the manager of Unión Laguna, starting his managing career, that lasted until 1970, becoming one of the most important managers in Mexican baseball, winning nine championships. Garibay was inducted into the Mexican Professional Baseball Hall of Fame as part of the class of 1977.

== Playing career ==
Garibay was born in Torreón, Coahuila on 6 June 1921. He made his Mexican League debut in 1941 playing for his hometown team, Unión Laguna de Torreón, aged 19, and won the Rookie of the Year Award. In 1944, he joined the Tecolotes de Nuevo Laredo. In 1947, Garibay transferred to the Tuneros de San Luis Potosí and played the final part of the 1948 season with the Azules de Veracruz. He played as catcher and outfielder.

== Managerial career ==
In 1949, Garibay was hired as the manager of Unión Laguna de Torreón. In his first season with the team, Unión Laguna reached the Final Series but lost in four games against Charros de Jalisco. The next year in his second year as manager, Garibay led the team to the 1950 Mexican League championship. Garibay managed Torreón for five seasons until 1953.

Garibay won four Mexican Pacific League titles with the Venados de Mazatlán, three back to back in the 1952–53, 1953–54 and 1954–55 seasons and one more in the 1957–58 season. Garibay won two championships in 1955 and 1956 with the Mineros de Cananea of the Arizona–Mexico League.

Garibay was hired by the Tigres de México in 1959 to replace Santos Amaro, but was kicked after a 10–23 record and substituted by Virgilio Arteaga; the Tigres, however, finished the season last with a 39–104 record, the worst in their history. The next year, the Tigres hired Garibay again, who led the team to the championship, finishing first with a 77–66 record. Garibay left the team during the 1963 season with a 46–53–1, replaced by José Luis García.

Garibay managed the Petroleros de Poza Rica in 1964. In 1965, Garibay joined Charros de Jalisco as the team manager, winning the 1967 championship. Garibay managed the Charros in 1968, 1969 and 1970, retiring after the end of the 1970 season; he was succeeded by legendary manager Cananea Reyes in 1971.

After his retirement as manager, Garibay's number 11 was retired by Algodoneros de Unión Laguna and Venados de Mazatlán.

== Managerial statistics ==
=== Mexican League ===
| Year | Team | Regular season | | | | | | Postseason | | | |
| Year | Team | Games | Won | Lost | Tied | Pct. | Finish | Won | Lost | Pct. | Notes |
|---|---|---|---|---|---|---|---|---|---|---|---|
| 1949 | Unión Laguna de Torreón | 87 | 49 | 36 | 2 | .575 | 2nd | 0 | 4 | .000 | Lost Final Series (Monterrey) |
| 1950 | Unión Laguna de Torreón | 90 | 48 | 36 | 6 | .567 | 2nd | 4 | 2 | .667 | Won Final Series (Jalisco) |
| 1951 | Unión Laguna de Torreón | 85 | 45 | 39 | 1 | .535 | 3rd | – | – | – | – |
| 1952 | Unión Laguna de Torreón | 92 | 48 | 42 | 2 | .533 | 2nd | – | – | – | – |
| 1953 | Unión Laguna de Torreón | 62 | 27 | 33 | 2 | .452 | 6th | – | – | – | – |
| 1959 | Tigres de México | 33 | 10 | 23 | 0 | .303 | 6th | – | – | – | – |
| 1960 | Tigres de México | 145 | 77 | 66 | 2 | .538 | 1st | – | – | – | – |
| 1961 | Tigres de México | 135 | 48 | 86 | 1 | .359 | 6th | – | – | – | – |
| 1962 | Tigres de México | 132 | 62 | 68 | 2 | .477 | 5th | – | – | – | – |
| 1963 | Tigres de México | 100 | 46 | 53 | 1 | .465 | 4th | – | – | – | – |
| 1964 | Petroleros de Poza Rica | 140 | 70 | 70 | 0 | .500 | 5th | – | – | – | – |
| 1965 | Charros de Jalisco | 140 | 71 | 68 | 1 | .511 | 3rd | – | – | – | – |
| 1966 | Charros de Jalisco | 140 | 69 | 70 | 1 | .496 | 6th | – | – | – | – |
| 1967 | Charros de Jalisco | 140 | 85 | 55 | 0 | .607 | 1st | – | – | – | – |
| 1968 | Charros de Jalisco | 140 | 77 | 63 | 0 | .550 | 3rd | – | – | – | – |
| 1969 | Charros de Jalisco | 152 | 82 | 70 | 0 | .539 | 3rd | – | – | – | – |
| 1970 | Charros de Jalisco | 150 | 83 | 66 | 1 | .557 | 3rd | – | – | – | – |
| Total | | 1963 | 997 | 944 | 22 | .513 | | 4 | 6 | .400 | |

== Death ==
Garibay died on 17 October 1996 in Torreón, Coahuila. Prior to his death, in 1977, Garibay was elected to the Mexican Professional Baseball Hall of Fame together with Santos Amaro.
