= 1940 Mexican Baseball League season =

1940 Mexican League season
- League: Mexican League
- Sport: Baseball
- Teams: 8
- Season champions: Azules de Veracruz

LMB seasons
- ← 1939 1941 →

The 1940 Mexican League season was the 16th season in the history of the Mexican League. It was contested by eight teams. Azules de Veracruz won the first championship in their history by finishing the season first with a record of 61 wins and 30 losses, led by the team's owner and manager Jorge Pasquel.

There were several team changes in the league. Prior to the beginning of the season, six clubs left the Mexican League to form their own competition, known as Liga Cismática (Schismatic League) or Liga del Golfo (Gulf League). Cafeteros de Córdoba, the 1939 champions, and El Águila de Veracruz, did not approve the arrival of businessman Jorge Pasquel and his team Azules de Veracruz, thus, decided to leave the Mexican League, joined by Alijadores de Tampico, Agrario de México, Tigres de Comintra and Puebla, that would play in the Liga Cismática.

Four new teams were established ahead of the season: Rojos del México owned by Salvador Lutteroth and Enrique Carmona, Azules de Veracruz owned by Pasquel, La Junta de Nuevo Laredo and Unión Laguna de Torreón. Later in the season, Alijadores left the Liga Cismática and rejoined the Mexican League, keeping their Liga Cismática record that counted towards the Mexican League standings; also, Dorados de Chihuahua bought the Gallos de Santa Rosa franchise and joined the league.

== Standings ==
Regular season standings
Pos	Team	W	L	Pct.	GB
1	Azules de Veracruz	61	30	.670	—
2	Rojos del México	57	38	.600	6.0
3	Industriales de Monterrey	52	41	.559	9.0
4	Alijadores de Tampico	46	41	.529	13.0
5	Unión Laguna de Torreón	45	41	.523	13.5
6	La Junta de Nuevo Laredo	39	48	.448	24.5
7	Dorados de Chihuahua	11	38	.224	29.0
8	Gallos de Santa Rosa	3	29	.094	30.0

== League leaders ==
Batting leaders
Stat	Player	Team	Total
AVG	(United States) Cool Papa Bell	Torreón / Azules	.437
HR	(United States) Cool Papa Bell	Torreón / Azules	12
RBI	(United States) Cool Papa Bell	Torreón / Azules	79
R	(United States) Cool Papa Bell	Torreón / Azules	119
H	(United States) Cool Papa Bell	Torreón / Azules	167
SB	(United States) Sam Bankhead	Monterrey	32

Pitching leaders
Stat	Player	Team	Total
ERA	(Cuba) Ramón Bragaña	Azules	2.58
W	(United States) Bill Jefferson	Monterrey	22
K	(United States) Edward Porter	Nuevo Laredo	232

== Milestones ==
=== Batters ===
- Cool Papa Bell (Torreón / Azules): Bell became the first player in the Mexican League history to win the Triple Crown recording a .437 batting average, 12 home runs and 79 RBIs.

=== Pitchers ===
==== No-hitters ====
- Leroy Gaines (Azules): On 18 July, Gaines threw the fifth no-hitter in Mexican League history and the first in franchise history by defeating the Dorados de Chihuahua 3–0 in eight innings.

== Awards ==
Award	Player	Team	Ref.
Rookie of the Year	(Mexico) Laureano Camacho	Azules	
