= Danny Gardella =

American baseball player (1920–2005)

- Outfielder / First baseman
- Born: February 26, 1920; New York City, New York, U.S.
- Died: March 6, 2005 (aged 85); Yonkers, New York, U.S.
- Batted: Left Threw: Left

MLB debut
- May 14, 1944, for the New York Giants

Last MLB appearance
- April 20, 1950, for the St. Louis Cardinals

MLB statistics
- Batting average: .267
- Home runs: 24
- Runs batted in: 85
- Stats at Baseball Reference

Teams
- New York Giants (1944–1945); St. Louis Cardinals (1950)

Daniel Lewis Gardella (February 26, 1920 – March 6, 2005) was an American professional baseball player who played most of his Major League Baseball (MLB) career as a left fielder with the New York Giants from 1944 to 1945. Born in New York City, he batted and threw left-handed.

Gardella is best known as one of the handful of MLB players who "jumped" their organized baseball teams to play in the "outlaw" Mexican League in 1946. After being blacklisted by Commissioner of Baseball Happy Chandler, Gardella filed suit against MLB, arguing that the reserve clause (and by extension, MLB's antitrust exemption) was illegal. The case, which was settled out of court, preceded the Seitz decision that would eventually guarantee MLB players free agency.

== Career ==
Gardella was a longshoreman at the Jersey City naval shipyard when he was discovered by a Giants scout in 1944, as a player on a semipro shipyard team. He played six weeks with the minor league Jersey City Giants before debuting with New York on May 14, 1944.

Known more for his on-field antics than his playing ability, Gardella would often walk on his hands, and perform other acrobatic stunts. He was also one of the first players to train with weights. Nevertheless, he was the first major league player who challenged baseball's reserve clause in an early chapter in the labor-management skirmishes that brought free agency and multimillion-dollar player contracts.

=== Major League Baseball ===
In a three-season career, Gardella compiled a .267 batting average with 24 home runs and 85 RBI in 169 games. His most productive season came in 1945, when he hit .272 with 18 home runs and 71 RBI in 121 games. In that season, some of his teammates included Ernie Lombardi, Mel Ott, Joe Medwick and Bill Voiselle.

=== Mexican League ===
However, in 1946, the Giants were interested in players returning from World War II military service. Gardella had been offered US$5,000 to play for the Giants, a raise of $500 from his salary the year before; he returned the contract unsigned, hoping to renegotiate at spring training. However, after arriving in Miami, Gardella was informed by manager Mel Ott that even if he did sign the contract, his career with the Giants was over and he would be put on the trade block.

Three days later, Gardella announced he had accepted an $13,000 offer to play in Mexico; the outfielder had met and befriended Mexican League president Jorge Pasquel over the offseason at a New York gym. Pasquel had also made generous offers to other major leaguers; pitchers Sal Maglie, Alex Carrasquel and Max Lanier and catcher Mickey Owen all defected to Mexico, despite the objections of their major league clubs.

In 100 games with the Azules de Veracruz, Gardella batted .275 with 13 home runs and 64 runs batted in. Veracruz manager Ramón Bragaña chose to play Gardella, naturally a left fielder, at first base. He was named to the Mexican League All-Star Game on July 9, 1946 as part of the Southern squad, where he hit two home runs.

Commissioner of Baseball Happy Chandler imposed a ban of at least five years on all the players who had gone to the Mexican League for violating the reserve clause. Shortstop Vern Stephens also joined the exodus but immediately returned before the season started to escape the sanction. The first player to learn of Chandler's seriousness was Owen, who returned the same year, asked for clemency, and was refused.

== Gardella v. Chandler ==
In October 1947, unable to get a baseball job in the major or minor leagues after playing in Mexico, Gardella sued the Major League Baseball hierarchy and the Giants in the United States District Court for the Southern District of New York, seeking $300,000 in damages. He charged that the reserve clause was "monopolistic and restrains trade." A year later, the case was dismissed by a federal judge who cited a 1922 Supreme Court ruling that found baseball was not a business engaged in interstate commerce within the meaning of federal antitrust law. But in February 1949, the Second Circuit Court of Appeals, in a 2-to-1 ruling, sent the case back to the district court and ordered a trial on Gardella's contentions.

In June 1949, faced with the prospect of a courtroom defeat, Chandler offered amnesty to the players who had gone to the Mexican League. Gardella, warned by his lawyer that he faced a long and costly legal battle, dropped his lawsuit. He said later that he received a $60,000 settlement from baseball.

== Later years ==
In 1950 Gardella signed with the St. Louis Cardinals, but was sent to the minors after one at bat and never again played in the major leagues. After leaving the game, he worked in a warehouse, as a hospital orderly and as a gym trainer.

Many years after Gardella faded from the baseball scene, the United States Supreme Court rejected two challenges to the reserve clause, most notably in the case, brought by outfielder Curt Flood. However, the players won free agency on December 23, 1975 after arbitrator Peter Seitz, ruling in a case brought by pitchers Dave McNally and Andy Messersmith, found that players could leave their teams after playing out their contracts.

Reflecting on his lawsuit and his possible consequences in an interview with the Los Angeles Times in 1994, Gardella took pride in having brought his court challenge. "I feel I let the whole world know that the reserve clause was unfair," he said. "It had the odor of peonage, even slavery."

Gardella died from congestive heart failure in Yonkers, New York on March 6, 2005, at age 85.

== See also ==
- Van Lingle Mungo (song)
