= Daniel Fernández (baseball) =

Mexican baseball player and manager

- Outfielder / Manager
- Born: 20 August 1965 (age 61); José Cardel, Veracruz, Mexico
- Bats: Left Throws: Left

LMB statistics
- Batting average: .313
- Hits: 2,648
- Home runs: 62
- Runs batted in: 841

Teams
- As player: Diablos Rojos del México (1983); Cafeteros de Córdoba (1984); Diablos Rojos del México (1985–2008); As manager: Diablos Rojos del México (2008–2009); Olmecas de Tabasco (2010); Rojos del Águila de Veracruz (2011); Leones de Yucatán (2012); Vaqueros Laguna (2016); Piratas de Campeche (2018); Guerreros de Oaxaca (2023)

Career highlights and awards
- Diablos Rojos del México #11 retired; Mexican League records: 1,837 career runs

Member of the Mexican Professional

Baseball Hall of Fame
- Induction: 2019

Daniel Fernández's number 11 was retired by the Diablos Rojos del México in 2009.

Daniel Fernández Méndez (born 20 August 1965) is a Mexican professional baseball manager and former outfielder. Fernández played 26 seasons in the Mexican League and spent all of his career, except for one season, playing as center fielder for the Diablos Rojos del México. He holds the Mexican League record for career runs with 1,837.

As manager, he won the 2008 Mexican League championship with the Diablos Rojos in his debut season. He has also managed the Olmecas de Tabasco, Rojos del Águila de Veracruz, Leones de Yucatán, Vaqueros Laguna, Piratas de Campeche and Guerreros de Oaxaca.

== Career ==
=== Early career ===
Fernández was born on 20 August 1965 in José Cardel, Veracruz. He made his professional debut in the Mexican League with the Diablos Rojos del México in 1983, playing only five games. The next season, 1984, he was traded to the Cafeteros de Córdoba, where he played 76 games. In 1985 he returned to the Diablos Rojos.

=== Diablos Rojos del México ===
On 1 May 2001, Fernández tied Héctor Espino's Mexican League record of 1,505 career runs in a game against the Algodoneros de Unión Laguna at the Foro Sol, that the Diablos won 6–5. The following day, 2 May, he broke the record with a home run to right field, bringing his total to 1,506 career runs.

After spending the 2007 season as both a player and third base coach, Fernández was appointed manager of the Diablos Rojos for the 2008 season, replacing Marco Antonio Vázquez. Initially serving as a player-manager, he announced his retirement as a player after the season opener against the Guerreros de Oaxaca at the Foro Sol on 19 March 2008.

He finished with Mexican League career with 2,285 games played, 2,648 hits, 388 doubles, 111 triples, 479 stolen bases and a career batting average of .313. As of the 2024 season, he holds the Mexican League record for career runs.

== Managerial career ==
=== Diablos Rojos del México ===
Fernández led the Diablos Rojos to the first place of the Mexican League South Division with a 66–39 record. The team swept the Piratas de Campeche 4–0 in the first round of the playoffs, then defeated the Leones de Yucatán 4 games to 2 in the South Division championship series. The Diablos went on to beat the Sultanes de Monterrey 4–1 in the Serie del Rey, claiming the 2008 Mexican League championship -the fifteenth in their history- in Fernández's debut season as manager. He won the Manager of the Year Award.

The Diablos Rojos finished the 2009 regular season first in the North Division with a 70–35 record. However, they were swept in four games by the Vaqueros Laguna in the first round of the playoffs. In November of that year, Fernández was dismissed as manager of the Diablos and replaced by Mako Oliveras.

=== Olmecas de Tabasco ===
On 23 March 2010, just five games into the 2010 Mexican League season, Fernández was appointed as manager of the Olmecas de Tabasco, replacing Gustavo Llenas, who had started the season with an 0–5 record. After 21 games and only five wins, Fernández was removed as manager of the Olmecas and replaced by Enrique Reyes.

=== Rojos del Águila de Veracruz ===
In November 2010, Fernández was named manager of the Rojos del Águila de Veracruz, ahead of the 2011 season. The team finished the season third in the South Division with a 103–54 record. They lost the South Division championship series 2–4 to the Tigres de Quintana Roo, that went on to win that year’s Mexican League title. He did not stay with the team and was replaced by Orlando Merced.

=== Leones de Yucatán ===
On 21 November 2012, Fernández was appointed manager of the Leones de Yucatán for the 2013 season. On 2 May 2013, he was sacked along hitting coach Juan Carlos Canizales due to poor results, as the Leones had 17–17 record. He was replaced by Marco Antonio Guzmán.

=== Vaqueros Laguna ===
On 7 May 2016, Fernández replaced Vicente Palacios as manager of the Vaqueros Laguna. Palacios had served as interim manager for seven games, leading the team to a 4–3 record, after replacing Mario Mendoza, who was fired following an 11–13 start. Vaqueros Laguna finished the season in fourth place in the North Zone. In the playoffs, they were swept in the first round in four games by the Sultanes de Monterrey. On 22 September 2016, Fernández was removed as manager of the team.

=== Piratas de Campeche ===
In December 2017, Fernández was appointed manager of the Piratas de Campeche ahead of the 2018 season, that was played in a two-tournament format. In the first tournament, the Piratas finished with a 22–34 record, failing to qualify for the playoffs. On 30 July 2018, 24 games into the second tournament, Fernández was sacked with a 10–14 record; he was replaced by hitting coach Rómulo Martínez as interim manager.

=== Guerreros de Oaxaca ===
On 9 August 2018, Fernández joined the Guerreros de Oaxaca as bench coach under manager Sergio Omar Gastélum.

On 7 July 2023, Fernández was appointed interim manager of the Guerreros, replacing Gerónimo Gil, who was fired after a 24–36 record. He led the team to a 34–53 finish, placing seventh in the South Division and failing to qualify for the playoffs.

=== Mexico national U-15 team ===
Fernández managed Mexico at the 2022 U-15 Baseball World Cup, held in Sonora, Mexico. The Mexican squad finished seventh with a 3–2 record.

=== Academia Alfredo Harp Helú ===
Fernández has worked as a coach in the Academia Alfredo Harp Helú, a baseball academy in San Bartolo Coyotepec, Oaxaca that serves as feeder for the Diablos Rojos del México and Guerreros de Oaxaca.

== Legacy ==
On 24 March 2009, the Diablos Rojos honored Fernández by retiring his number 11.

In 2015 we has inducted in the Mazatlán Baseball Hall of Fame.

On 13 November 2019, he was enshrined in the Mexican Professional Baseball Hall of Fame alongside Fernando Valenzuela, Ricardo Sáenz and baseball executive Cuauhtémoc Rodríguez as part of the class of 2014. Although they were elected in 2014, the induction ceremony was delayed until 2019 due to the construction of the new Hall of Fame building in Monterrey.

In February 2025, Fernández was selected by a committee of journalists as the center fielder for the Mexican League Centennial All-Time Team on the occasion of the league's hundredth anniversary.

== Managerial record ==
=== Mexican League ===
| Year | Team | Regular season | | | | | | Postseason | | | |
| Year | Team | Games | Won | Lost | Tied | Pct. | Finish | Won | Lost | Pct. | Notes |
|---|---|---|---|---|---|---|---|---|---|---|---|
| 2008 | Diablos Rojos del México | 105 | 66 | 39 | 0 | .629 | 1st | 12 | 3 | .800 | Won Serie del Rey (Monterrey) |
| 2009 | Diablos Rojos del México | 106 | 70 | 35 | 1 | .665 | 1st | 3 | 4 | .429 | Lost First round (Laguna) |
| 2010 | Olmecas de Tabasco | 21 | 5 | 16 | 0 | .238 | – | – | – | – | – |
| 2011 | Rojos del Águila de Veracruz | 103 | 54 | 49 | 0 | .524 | 1st | 6 | 7 | .462 | Lost Championship series (Tigres) |
| 2012 | Leones de Yucatán | 34 | 17 | 17 | 0 | .500 | – | – | – | – | – |
| 2016 | Vaqueros Laguna | 82 | 48 | 34 | 0 | .585 | 1st | 0 | 4 | .000 | Lost First round (Monterrey) |
| 2018 | Piratas de Campeche | 80 | 32 | 48 | 0 | .400 | – | – | – | – | – |
| 2023 | Guerreros de Oaxaca | 27 | 10 | 17 | 0 | .370 | – | – | – | – | – |
| Total | | 558 | 302 | 255 | 1 | .542 | | 21 | 18 | .538 | |
