= Guillermo Álvarez (baseball) =

Mexican baseball player (1926–2007)

- Shortstop / Manager
- Born: 14 August 1926; San Andrés Tuxtla, Veracruz, Mexico
- Died: 8 April 2007 (aged 80); Culiacán, Sinaloa
- Batted: Right Threw: Right

Career highlights and awards
- Mexican League Rookie of the Year (1946)

Member of the Mexican Professional

Baseball Hall of Fame
- Induction: 1976

Guillermo Álvarez (14 August 1926 – 8 April 2007), nicknamed Huevito, was a Mexican professional baseball shortstop and manager. He is considered the best shortstop to ever play for El Águila de Veracruz, where he spent most of his Mexican League (LMB) career, and one of the best Mexican shortstops of all time.

== Career ==
Álvarez debuted in the Mexican League at the age of 19 with the Pericos de Puebla during the 1946 season, in a May 23 game against the Azules de Veracruz; he made several sensational plays that game, including the final out. Álvarez finished the year hitting .306, winning rookie of the year honors.

He played most of his career (1949–1957) with Águila de Veracruz, where he won a championship in 1952. He was best known as a defensive shortstop, though he batted .334 in batting and hit 18 home runs in 1955. He won Álvarez was a Mexican League all-star for fifteen consecutive seasons.

In the later part of his career he was a player-manager with Leones de Yucatán (1958) and with Águila de Veracruz (1959). He retired after a stint with the Sultanes de Monterrey in 1961. He finished his LMB career with a .270 career batting average and a .366 slugging percentage.

Álvarez also played 16 winter ball seasons with the Tomateros de Culiacán of the Mexican Pacific League. He was inducted into the Mexican Professional Baseball Hall of Fame in 1976.
