= Felipe Montemayor =

Mexican baseball player (1928–2025)

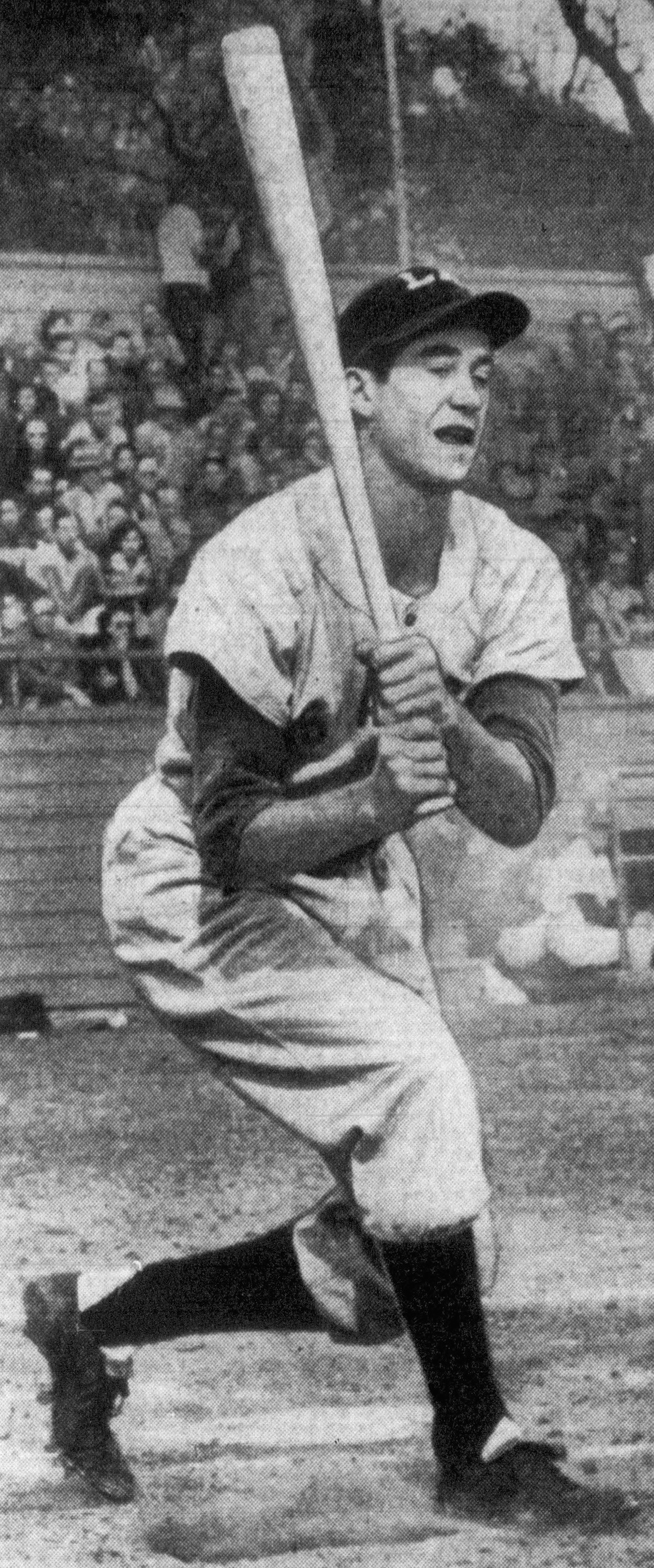
- Montemayor in 1949
- Outfielder
- Born: February 7, 1928; Monterrey, Nuevo León, Mexico
- Died: February 4, 2025 (aged 96); Monterrey, Nuevo León, Mexico
- Batted: Left Threw: Left

MLB debut
- April 14, 1953, for the Pittsburgh Pirates

Last MLB appearance
- June 12, 1955, for the Pittsburgh Pirates

MLB statistics
- Batting average: .173
- Home runs: 2
- Runs batted in: 8
- Stats at Baseball Reference

Teams
- Pittsburgh Pirates (1953, 1955)

Career highlights and awards
- Mexican League Rookie of the Year (1948)

Member of the Mexican Professional

Baseball Hall of Fame
- Induction: 1983

Felipe Ángel Montemayor (February 7, 1928 – February 4, 2025) was a Mexican professional baseball player. The outfielder played in 64 games for the Pittsburgh Pirates of Major League Baseball during 1953 and 1955 and all or parts of 14 years in his native country. Born in Monterrey, Nuevo León, Mexico, and nicknamed "Clipper", he threw and batted left-handed; he was listed as 6 feet 2 inches (1.88 m) tall and 185 pounds (84 kg).

Counting his service in the U.S. minor leagues, Montemayor played 21 seasons of professional baseball. His MLB career consisted of 28- (1953) and 36- (1955) game stints for the Pirates. Montemayor made his major league debut on April 14, 1953, and hit a fly-ball out against Joe Black of the Brooklyn Dodgers. His only two career home runs came in both games of a doubleheader against the St. Louis Cardinals on May 1, 1955. The blows—each with one runner on base—were struck off Floyd Wooldridge (Game 1) and Gordon Jones (Game 2). During his MLB career Montemayor batted .173, with 26 hits; five doubles and three triples accompanied his two homers.

He played the 1952–53 Cuban League season with Cienfuegos, leading the league in triples, with five and hit two grand-slam home runs in consecutive games on December 28 and 30, 1952.

Montemayor died on February 4, 2025, at the age of 96.

== Career statistics ==
=== Cuban League ===
Season	Team	G	AB	R	H	2B	3B	HR	RBI	SB	BA
1952–53	Cienfuegos		213	30	55	2	5	7	30	1	.258
Total			213	30	55	2	5	7	30	1	.258
