= 1949 Mexican Baseball League season =

1949 Mexican League season
- League: Mexican League
- Sport: Baseball
- Teams: 8

Serie Final
- Champions: Sultanes de Monterrey
- Runners-up: Unión Laguna de Torreón

LMB seasons
- ← 1948 1950 →

The 1949 Mexican League season was the 25th season in the history of the Mexican League. It was contested by eight teams. Sultanes de Monterrey won their third championship in a row and fourth in their history after defeating Unión Laguna de Torreón in the Final Series, led by manager Lázaro Salazar.

The season was contested in a split-season format, where the winner of each one of the two halves of the tournament faced each other in the Final Series to determine the champion. Monterrey won the first half with a 25–18 record, while Torreón won the second half with a 29–13 record. The Sultanes sweeped Unión Laguna in four games to claim the championship.

== Standings ==
First half standings
| Pos | Team | W | L | Pct. | GB |
|---|---|---|---|---|---|
| 1 | Sultanes de Monterrey | 25 | 18 | .581 | — |
| 2 | Tuneros de San Luis Potosí | 24 | 19 | .558 | 1.0 |
| 3 | Azules de Veracruz | 23 | 19 | .548 | 1.5 |
| 4 | Diablos Rojos del México | 22 | 20 | .524 | 2.5 |
| 5 | Charros de Jalisco | 21 | 21 | .500 | 3.5 |
| 6 | Unión Laguna de Torreón | 20 | 23 | .465 | 5.0 |
| 7 | Rojos del Águila de Veracruz | 18 | 24 | .429 | 6.5 |
| 8 | Tecolotes de Nuevo Laredo | 17 | 25 | .405 | 7.5 |

Second half standings
| Pos | Team | W | L | Pct. | GB |
|---|---|---|---|---|---|
| 1 | Unión Laguna de Torreón | 29 | 13 | .690 | — |
| 2 | Sultanes de Monterrey | 27 | 15 | .643 | 2.0 |
| 3 | Charros de Jalisco | 22 | 20 | .524 | 7.0 |
| 4 | Rojos del Águila de Veracruz | 21 | 21 | .500 | 8.0 |
| 5 | Azules de Veracruz | 19 | 23 | .452 | 10.0 |
| 6 | Diablos Rojos del México | 19 | 23 | .452 | 10.0 |
| 7 | Tuneros de San Luis Potosí | 17 | 25 | .405 | 12.0 |
| 8 | Tecolotes de Nuevo Laredo | 14 | 28 | .333 | 15.0 |

== Postseason ==
=== Final Series ===
Sultanes de Monterrey won the series, 4–0.

| Game | Date | Score | Location | Time | Attendance |
|---|---|---|---|---|---|
| 1 | 3 October | Monterrey – 8, Torreón – 5 | Estadio Revolución | - | - |
| 2 | 4 October | Monterrey – 6, Torreón – 2 | Estadio Revolución | - | - |
| 3 | 5 October | Torreón – 4, Monterrey – 9 | Parque Cuauhtémoc | - | - |
| 4 | 6 October | Torreón – 4, Monterrey – 7 | Parque Cuauhtémoc | - | - |

== League leaders ==
Batting leaders
| Stat | Player | Team | Total |
|---|---|---|---|
| AVG | (Cuba) Tribilín Cabrera | Jalisco | .382 |
| HR | (Mexico) Jesús Díaz | Torreón | 13 |
| RBI | (Mexico) Jesús Díaz | Torreón | 83 |
| R | (Cuba) Pablo García | Monterrey | 78 |
| H | (Cuba) Dilio Rodríguez | Torreón | 132 |
| SB | (Mexico) Alfredo Jiménez | Jalisco | 27 |

Pitching leaders
| Stat | Player | Team | Total |
|---|---|---|---|
| ERA | (Mexico) Alfonso Ramírez | México | 2.35 |
| W | (Mexico) Daniel Ríos | Monterrey | 21 |
| K | (Cuba) Wilfredo Salas | Torreón | 158 |

== Awards ==
| Award | Player | Team | Ref. |
|---|---|---|---|
| Rookie of the Year | (Mexico) Leo Rodríguez | Torreón | |
