= 1967 Mexican Baseball League season =

1967 Mexican League season
- League: Mexican League
- Sport: Baseball
- Duration: 21 March
- Games: 565
- Teams: 8
- Season champions: Charros de Jalisco

LMB seasons
- ← 1966 1968 →

The 1967 Mexican League season was the 43rd season in the history of the Mexican League. It was contested by eight teams. Charros de Jalisco won the championship by finishing the season first with a record of 85 wins and 55 losses, led by manager Guillermo Garibay.

The season started on 21 March with four games: Jalisco defeated the Tigres 5–2 in Guadalajara; Poza Rica beat México 5–3 to in Mexico City; Puebla defeated Reynosa 4–1 in Puebla; and Veracruz beat Monterrey 3–2 in Veracruz.

Starting from this season, the Mexican League received Triple-A class from Minor League Baseball.

== Teams ==
| Team | City | Stadium | Manager |
|---|---|---|---|
| Broncos de Reynosa | Reynosa, Tamaulipas | Estadio Adolfo López Mateos | Luis Arroyo |
| Charros de Jalisco | Guadalajara, Jalisco | Estadio Tecnológico de la UDG | Guillermo Garibay |
| Diablos Rojos del México | Mexico City | Parque del Seguro Social | Tomás Herrera |
| El Águila de Veracruz | Veracruz, Veracruz | Parque Deportivo Veracruzano | Vinicio García |
| Tigres de México | Mexico City | Parque del Seguro Social | Ricardo Garza |
| Pericos de Puebla | Puebla, Puebla | Estadio Olímpico Ignacio Zaragoza | José Luis García |
| Petroleros de Poza Rica | Poza Rica, Veracruz | Estadio Heriberto Jara Corona | Winston Brown |
| Sultanes de Monterrey | Monterrey, Nuevo León | Parque Cuauhtémoc | Wilfredo Calviño |

== Standings ==
Regular season standings
| Rank | Team | W | L | T | Pct. | GB |
|---|---|---|---|---|---|---|
| 1 | Charros de Jalisco | 85 | 55 | 0 | .607 | — |
| 2 | Broncos de Reynosa | 80 | 60 | 1 | .571 | 5.0 |
| 3 | Diablos Rojos del México | 76 | 63 | 3 | .547 | 8.5 |
| 4 | Rojos del Águila de Veracruz | 71 | 69 | 1 | .507 | 14.0 |
| 5 | Petroleros de Poza Rica | 65 | 75 | 3 | .464 | 20.0 |
| 6 | Tigres Capitalinos | 64 | 75 | 1 | .460 | 20.5 |
| 7 | Sultanes de Monterrey | 60 | 80 | 2 | .429 | 25.0 |
| 8 | Pericos de Puebla | 57 | 81 | 3 | .413 | 27.0 |

== League leaders ==
Batting leaders
| Stat | Player | Team | Total |
|---|---|---|---|
| AVG | (Mexico) Héctor Espino | Monterrey | .379 |
| HR | (United States) Elrod Hendricks | Jalisco | 41 |
| RBI | (Dominican Republic) Winston Llenas | Jalisco | 113 |
| R | (Mexico) Miguel Gaspar | Veracruz | 374 |
| H | (Mexico) Emilio Sosa | Poza Rica | 184 |
| SB | (Mexico) Abelardo Balderas | México | 41 |
| SLG | (Mexico) Héctor Espino | Monterrey | .706 |

Pitching leaders
| Stat | Player | Team | Total |
|---|---|---|---|
| ERA | (Mexico) Mario Peláez | México | 2.21 |
| W | (Cuba) Andrés Ayón | Jalisco | 25 |
| IP | (Mexico) Ramón Arano | México | 249.0 |
| K | (Mexico) Francisco Maytorena | Reynosa | 175 |
| WHIP | (Mexico) César Gutiérrez | Poza Rica | 0.906 |

== Awards ==
| Award | Player | Team | Ref. |
|---|---|---|---|
| Rookie of the Year | (Mexico) Francisco Maytorena | Reynosa | |
