= Estadio Municipal (Guadalajara) =

Baseball stadium in Guadalajara, Jalisco, Mexico

- Interactive map of Estadio Municipal
- Location: Guadalajara, Jalisco, Mexico
- Coordinates: 20°39′45.8″N 103°20′41.9″W
- Capacity: 15,000

Construction
- Opened: 1931
- Closed: 1950
- Demolished: 1950
- Architect: Aurelio Aceves

Tenants
- Charros de Jalisco (1946–1950)

The Estadio Municipal (Municipal Stadium) was a baseball stadium in Guadalajara, Jalisco, Mexico. Opened in 1931 and designed by Aurelio Aceves, it was the first municipal stadium in Guadalajara and hosted the Charros de Jalisco of the Mexican Baseball League. The stadium was demolished in 1950.

== History ==
The Estadio Municipal was opened in 1931 and was Guadalajara's first municipal stadium, located in the Analco neighborhood in downtown Guadalajara. The stadium, designed by engineer and architect Aurelio Aceves, was mainly used for baseball games, but also for other athletic and civic events.

The stadium was built in the former grounds of the Santa María de los Ángeles cemetery, established in 1833 by the Franciscans in the middle of a cholera epidemic in the city of Guadalajara. The cemetery was later demolished and replaced by the Estadio Municipal.

When the Charros de Jalisco baseball club was established in 1946, the Estadio Municipal hosted the team's home games. The stadium could seat 15,000 spectators. The stadium was demolished in 1950 to build Guadalajara's central bus station.
