= Ramón Arano =

Mexican baseball player

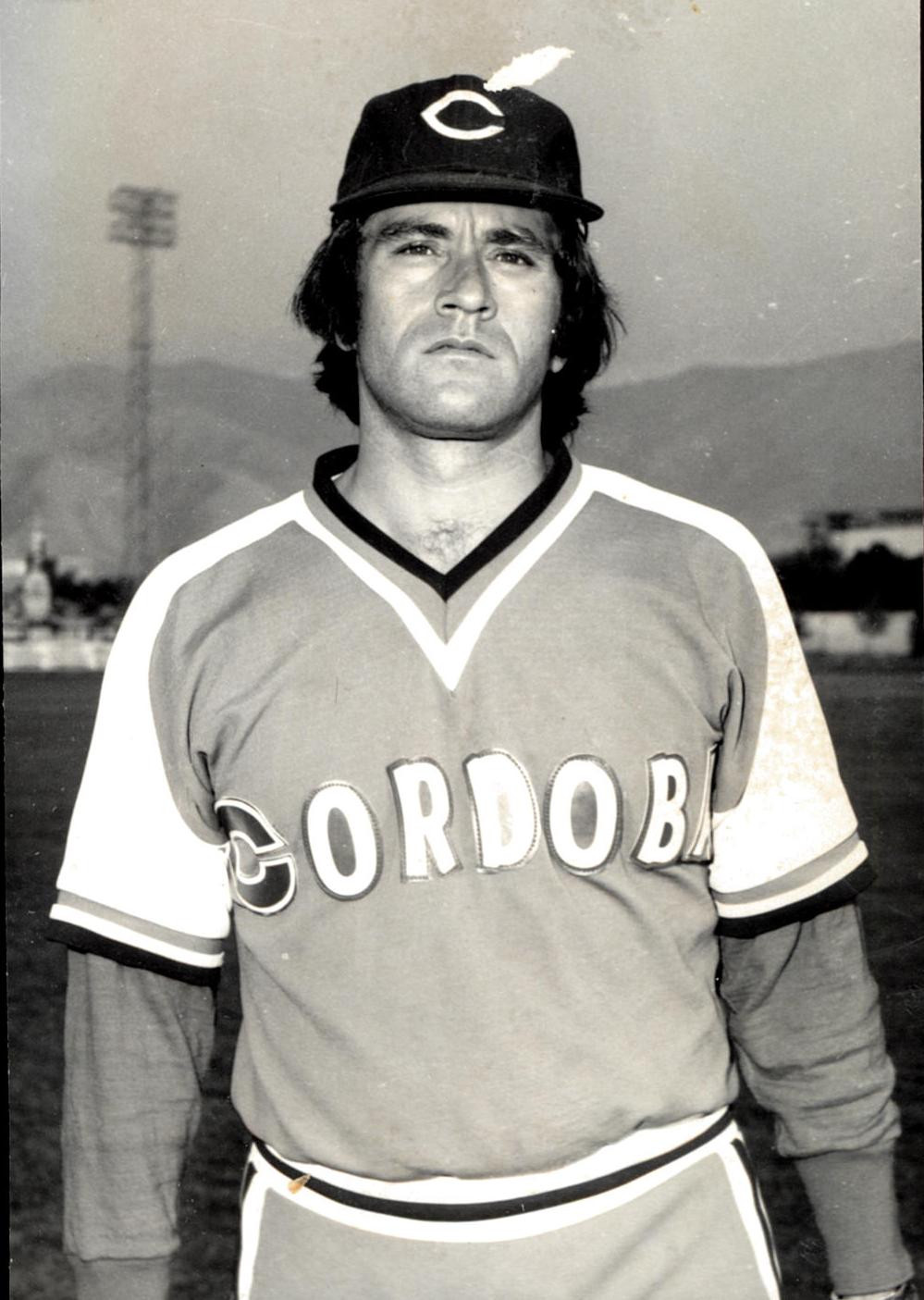
- Pitcher
- Born: 31 August 1939; Cosamaloapan, Veracruz, Mexico
- Died: 5 May 2012 (aged 72); Veracruz, Veracruz, Mexico
- Batted: Right Threw: Right
- Stats at Baseball Reference

Teams
- Petroleros de Poza Rica (1959); Rojos del Águila de Veracruz (1959–1962, 1984–1986, 1995, 2001); Diablos Rojos del México (1963–1971, 1981–1982); Saraperos de Saltillo (1971); Cafeteros de Córdoba (1972–1979, 1998); Broncos de Reynosa (1980); Azules de Coatzacoalcos (1983); Ganaderos de Tabasco (1986)

Career highlights and awards
- Mexican League Rookie of the Year (1959)

Member of the Mexican Professional

Baseball Hall of Fame
- Induction: 1993

Ramón Arano Bravo (31 August 1939 – 5 May 2012) was a Mexican professional baseball starting pitcher who is enshrined in the Mexican Professional Baseball Hall of Fame. His playing career lasted from 1959 to 2001.

== Playing career ==
Arano began his career in 1959. Missing only the 1965 season, he played almost continuously until 1986, when he was 46 years old. He pitched sparingly afterwards, playing a little in 1995, 1998 and 2001 (when he was 61 years old) and he showed an intention to pitch in the 2010s, though that did not come to fruition. He spent almost his entire career in the Mexican League, though he also pitched three games in the United States - for the Oklahoma City 89ers, then a Houston Astros farm team, in 1962.

Due to the length of his career, Arano accomplished many notable feats. Along with Hub Kittle, he is one of only two pitchers to play professionally in organized baseball in six different decades. He is also the only hurler to ever win 300 or more games in a single minor league. He holds the Mexican League record for career wins (334), losses (264), complete games (297), shutouts (57), innings pitched (4,773), hits allowed (5,102), runs allowed (2,121), earned runs allowed (1,730) and pitching appearances (811). His lifetime ERA was 3.26.

In the Mexican Pacific League, a winter league, he posted a record of 89-88.

Arano also managed on-and-off during his career, with his first trial as skipper in 1977 and his last in 1999.

He was elected to the Mexican Professional Baseball Hall of Fame in 1993.

In 2020, Arano was selected as the starting right-handed pitcher on the Mexican League Historic Ideal Team by a committee of baseball journalists and historians.

In February 2025, Arano was selected by a committee of journalists as a pitcher for the Mexican League Centennial All-Time Team on the occasion of the league's hundredth anniversary.

== Personal life ==
Arano was born on 31 August 1939 in Cosamaloapan, Mexico and died on 5 May 2012 in Veracruz City, Mexico, at the age of 72. His cause of death was cancer.
