= Empalme, Sonora =

City in Sonora, Mexico

Coordinates: 27°57′42″N 110°48′45″W

Empalme is a city surrounded by the homonymous municipality located on the south-central coast of the Mexican state of Sonora. According to the 2005 census, the population of the city was 40,630 inhabitants, while the municipality, which has an area of 708.53 km^{2} (273.56 sq mi), reported 50,663 inhabitants. Except for its coastline on the Gulf of California (Sea of Cortes), the municipality is surrounded by the much larger municipality of Guaymas.

== Name ==
In Spanish, the word empalme means "junction". At first, the community site was called Kilómetro Nueve because it was nine kilometres out of the port city of Guaymas. Then it was called El Empalme meaning the junction. The El was soon dropped.

== History ==
Unlike other towns or cities in Mexico, Empalme was built entirely by foreigners, specifically the Utah Construction Company under contract to the Southern Pacific Railroad Company. Very few native materials were used in the construction. The founders owned a major railroad, affording easy transportation of materials and personnel. The purpose of the settlement was to provide repair facilities for SP operations in Mexico, with a large shop and roundhouse. They still exist today, although unused; repair and maintenance now being done in Guadalajara, Jalisco. Hundreds of the homes built originally still exist in Empalme, their design and materials unchanged.

One native feature that the developers used was the planting of hundreds of Ficus microcarpa known locally as the Yucateco brought from southern Mexico. It grows to heights exceeding 100 feet. Their common name implies that they are native to the state of Yucatán. These trees were well suited for the hot, humid climate of Empalme. They are still probably the most easily recognized feature of the town. In many places they cover entire streets for several blocks so that streets appear to be passing through a tunnel.

== Geography ==
=== Climate ===
Empalme experiences a desert climate with warm winters and hot summers.

Climate data for Empalme (OBS), Sonora (normals 1981–2020, extremes 1982–2020, humidity and sun 1981–2010)
Month	Jan	Feb	Mar	Apr	May	Jun	Jul	Aug	Sep	Oct	Nov	Dec	Year
Record high °C (°F)	32.9 (91.2)	36.6 (97.9)	39.1 (102.4)	40.6 (105.1)	44.5 (112.1)	44.5 (112.1)	45.0 (113.0)	41.9 (107.4)	43.4 (110.1)	41.1 (106.0)	35.0 (95.0)	32.0 (89.6)	45.0 (113.0)
Mean daily maximum °C (°F)	24.2 (75.6)	25.6 (78.1)	27.6 (81.7)	30.9 (87.6)	32.6 (90.7)	35.1 (95.2)	35.7 (96.3)	35.5 (95.9)	35.4 (95.7)	33.1 (91.6)	27.9 (82.2)	24.0 (75.2)	30.6 (87.1)
Daily mean °C (°F)	17.0 (62.6)	18.0 (64.4)	19.8 (67.6)	22.9 (73.2)	25.1 (77.2)	28.6 (83.5)	30.7 (87.3)	30.6 (87.1)	30.0 (86.0)	26.3 (79.3)	20.7 (69.3)	17.2 (63.0)	23.8 (74.8)
Mean daily minimum °C (°F)	9.8 (49.6)	10.5 (50.9)	11.9 (53.4)	15.0 (59.0)	17.6 (63.7)	22.2 (72.0)	25.8 (78.4)	25.8 (78.4)	24.5 (76.1)	19.5 (67.1)	13.6 (56.5)	10.5 (50.9)	17.1 (62.8)
Record low °C (°F)	−1.5 (29.3)	−1.2 (29.8)	4.6 (40.3)	6.7 (44.1)	10.5 (50.9)	14.2 (57.6)	10.5 (50.9)	2.1 (35.8)	14.7 (58.5)	10.3 (50.5)	4.0 (39.2)	1.0 (33.8)	−1.5 (29.3)
Average precipitation mm (inches)	15.2 (0.60)	7.5 (0.30)	11.7 (0.46)	1.1 (0.04)	0.3 (0.01)	2.5 (0.10)	22.3 (0.88)	51.8 (2.04)	18.8 (0.74)	10.7 (0.42)	17.0 (0.67)	15.8 (0.62)	161.5 (6.36)
Average relative humidity (%)	59	56	53	48	53	58	65	69	66	59	56	60	58
Mean monthly sunshine hours	251	246	300	307	366	347	313	298	295	297	264	265	3,548
Source 1: Servicio Meteorológico Nacional
Source 2: Ogimet (sun and humidity 1981–2010)

== Economy ==
The economy of Empalme is based on agriculture, cattle ranching, fishing and small industries. The salty soil and lack of water makes agriculture difficult. Main crops are wheat, melon, and squash. Cattle raising is modest with the 2000 census reporting more than 9,000 head. With its 30 kilometer coastline there is fishing with hauls of shrimp, shark, crab, and octopus, among others. Pollution and the heating of the ocean water due to the thermal electric plant of Batuecas have reduced the local catches in recent years.

There is an industrial area nearby with small transformation industries. The main employer in the town continues to be the railroad repair facilities, which employed over 3,000 workers in 2000.

The Conurbation Zoning Plan for Guaymas & Empalme has included a Maritime Port & Industrial zone on the county coastline that will help to grow import & export cargos from local producers in Sonora, as well as a deep sea port for the Southwestern United States for energy products. The company Omanor S. A. is developing a $200 million US Dollar Hydrocarbon Fluids Marine Terminal to receive oil products for regional distribution.

In the tourist sector there is potential in the long coastline of sandy beaches, which has not yet been developed.

== Notable people ==
- Ronnie Camacho (born 1935), professional baseball first baseman and politician
- José Luis Castillo (born 1973), professional boxer
- Ángel Castro (1917–1983), professional baseball player
- Jesús Francisco López (born 1997), professional footballer
- Miguel Gaspar (1929–2012), professional baseball catcher
- Hernán Márquez (born 1988), professional boxer
- Jesse Pintado (1969–2006), guitarist for Napalm Death
- Jesús Zambrano Grijalva (born 1953), politician
