= Kit Pellow =

American baseball player (born 1973)

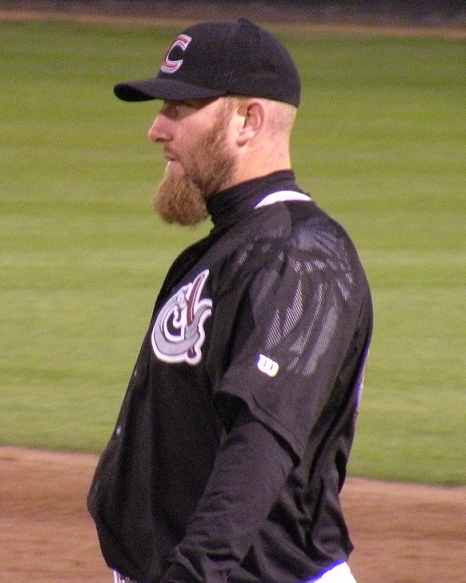
- First baseman
- Born: August 28, 1973 (age 52); Kansas City, Missouri, U.S.
- Batted: Right Threw: Right

Professional debut
- MLB: August 14, 2002, for the Kansas City Royals
- KBO: April 22, 2005, for the Lotte Giants
- CPBL: September 19, 2007, for the La New Bears

Last appearance
- MLB: August 22, 2004, for the Colorado Rockies
- KBO: September 27, 2005, for the Lotte Giants
- CPBL: October 1, 2007, for the La New Bears

MLB statistics
- Batting average: .257
- Home runs: 4
- Runs batted in: 19

KBO statistics
- Batting average: .284
- Home runs: 23
- Runs batted in: 69

CPBL statistics
- Batting average: .286
- Home runs: 1
- Runs batted in: 5
- Stats at Baseball Reference

Teams
- Kansas City Royals (2002); Colorado Rockies (2003–2004); Lotte Giants (2005); La New Bears (2007)

Career highlights and awards
- Mexican League batting champion (2008)

Kit Donovan Pellow (born August 28, 1973) is an American former professional baseball utility player. He played in Major League Baseball (MLB) for the Kansas City Royals and Colorado Rockies, in the KBO League for the Lotte Giants, and in the Chinese Professional Baseball League (CPBL) for the La New Bears.

== Career ==
Pellow was drafted by the Kansas City Royals in the 60th round of the 1994 Major League Baseball draft, but he did not sign. He played collegiately for Johnson County Community College and the University of Arkansas.

He was drafted by the Royals again in the 22nd round of the 1996 Major League Baseball draft. He signed, and made his Major League Baseball debut on August 14, 2002.

Pellow broke up a no-hit bid by Tom Glavine of the New York Mets in the 8th inning of a game between the Colorado Rockies and New York Mets at Shea Stadium on May 23, 2004.

Pellow last appeared in a major league game during the 2004 season. He has since played for the Saraperos de Saltillo of the Mexican League, and Tomateros de Culiacán, Yaquis de Ciudad Obregón in the Mexican Pacific League, and La New Bears of the Chinese Professional Baseball League. In 2008, Pellow hit .385 with 34 home runs and 107 RBIs for the Saraperos and won the Mexican Baseball League Triple Crown. He is only the seventh player in league history to win the triple crown.

In 2010, Pellow split the season between the Broncos de Reynosa in the Mexican League, the Tijuana Cimarrones of the Golden Baseball League, and the Schaumburg Flyers of the Northern League.
