= 2008 Mexican Baseball League season =

2008 Mexican League season
- League: Mexican League
- Sport: Baseball
- Duration: March 19 – August 24
- Games: 899
- Teams: 16

Serie del Rey
- Champions: Diablos Rojos del México
- Runners-up: Sultanes de Monterrey
- Finals MVP: José Luis Sandoval

LMB seasons
- ← 2007 2009 →

The 2008 Mexican League season was the 84th season in the history of the Mexican League. It was contested by 16 teams, evenly divided in North and South zones. The season started on 19 March with the match between 2008 season champions Sultanes de Monterrey and Saraperos de Saltillo and ended on 24 August with the last game of the Serie del Rey, where Diablos Rojos del México defeated the Sultanes to win the championship.

899 games were played with a total attendance of 4,035,169 spectators, averaging 4,850 per game.

Starting from this season, the league established the Most Valuable Player Award, presented to the best player at the end of the season.

== Standings ==
North
Rank	Team	W	L	Pct.	GB	STK
1	Acereros de Monclova	69	40	.633	—	L1
2	Saraperos de Saltillo	66	42	.611	2.5	W1
3	Sultanes de Monterrey	64	46	.582	5.5	W8
4	Dorados de Chihuahua	54	53	.505	14.0	W1
5	Vaqueros de la Laguna	52	57	.477	17.0	L1
6	Potros de Tijuana	46	61	.430	22.0	L1
7	Pericos de Puebla	43	65	.398	25.5	W1
8	Tecolotes de Nuevo Laredo	39	70	.358	30.0	L8

South
Rank	Team	W	L	Pct.	GB	STK
1	Diablos Rojos del México	66	39	.629	—	L1
2	Tigres de Quintana Roo	65	44	.596	3.0	W1
3	Leones de Yucatán	64	44	.593	3.5	W5
4	Piratas de Campeche	58	49	.542	9.0	L1
5	Rojos del Águila de Veracruz	57	53	.518	11.5	W1
6	Olmecas de Tabasco	55	52	.514	12.0	L3
7	Petroleros de Minatitlán	35	73	.324	32.5	L5
8	Guerreros de Oaxaca	30	75	.286	36.0	W3

== Postseason ==
First stage
1	Acereros de Monclova	4
8	Dorados de Chihuahua	3
North
4	Saraperos de Saltillo	0
5	Sultanes de Monterrey	4
2	Diablos Rojos del México	4
7	Piratas de Campeche	0
South
3	Tigres de Quintana Roo	2
6	Leones de Yucatán	4

Championship Series
1	Acereros de Monclova	0
3	Sultanes de Monterrey	4
1	Diablos Rojos del México	4
3	Leones de Yucatán	2

Serie del Rey
N3	Sultanes de Monterrey	1
S1	Diablos Rojos del México	4

== League leaders ==
Batting leaders
Stat	Player	Team	Total
AVG	(United States) Kit Pellow	Saltillo	.385
HR	(United States) Kit Pellow	Saltillo	34
RBI	(United States) Kit Pellow	Saltillo	107
R	(United States) Donzell McDonald	Monclova	96
H	(Mexico) Víctor Bojórquez	México	151
SB	(United States) Demond Smith	Chihuahua	38
SLG	(United States) Kit Pellow	Saltillo	.730

Pitching leaders
Stat	Player	Team	Total
ERA	(Mexico) Juan Delgadillo	Laguna	2.29
W	(Dominican Republic) Nerio Rodríguez	Monclova	17
SV	(Dominican Republic) Máximo de la Rosa	Chihuahua	29
IP	(Mexico) Francisco Campos	Campeche	149.2
K	(Mexico) Francisco Campos	Campeche	115
K	(United States) Félix Villegas	Saltillo	115
WHIP	(Mexico) Francisco Campos	Campeche	1.05

== Awards ==
LMB Awards
Award	Player	Team	Ref.
Most Valuable Player	(United States) Kit Pellow	Saraperos de Saltillo	
Rookie of the Year	(Mexico) Alfredo Caudillo	Saraperos de Saltillo	
Best Pitcher	(Dominican Republic) Nerio Rodríguez	Acereros del Norte	
Best Relief Pitcher	(Mexico) David Cortés	Diablos Rojos del México	
Manager of the Year	(Mexico) Daniel Fernández	Diablos Rojos del México	
