= Alijadores de Tampico =

Former Mexican professional baseball team

Information
- League: Mexican League
- Ballpark: Parque Alijadores
- Established: 1937
- Folded: 1985
- League championships: 1945, 1946, 1975
- Former name: Estibadores de Tampico (1971–72); Astros de Tamaulipas (1983–85)
- Colors: Royal blue and gold

The Alijadores de Tampico (Tampico Lightermen) were a professional baseball club based in Tampico, Tamaulipas that played in the Mexican League between the 1940s and 1980s.

== History ==
The Alijadores de Tampico were established in 1937 and joined the Mexican League. The team won titles in 1945 and 1946. However, they were not very profitable and did not play from 1949 through 1970.

Between 1968 and 1970, a new stadium was built in Tampico, financed by Nicolás Canavati, a businessman from Monterrey: the Parque Alijadores. In 1971 the league expanded from 10 to 12 teams, reinstating the franchise, that played as the Estibadores de Tampico (Tampico Stevedores) during two seasons. Starting 1973, the team returned to its former name and won the championship title in 1975.

After the 1979 season, Tampico was once again removed from the league, with the franchise moving to Toluca, becoming the Osos Negros de Toluca. The franchise once again returned in 1983 and was renamed the Astros de Tampico for that season, playing again as the Alijadores in 1984. Since then, no other team based in Tampico has participated in Mexican professional baseball.

== Notable players ==
- 21 (Mexico) All-time Mexican League great Héctor Espino helped win a Mexican League championship for the Alijadores de Tampico in 1975.

== Year-by-year record ==
Year	Record	Finish	Manager	Postseason	Notes
1940	46–41	4th	Guillermo Ornelas	—	
1941	52–49	3rd	Guillermo Ornelas	—	
1942	44–40	3rd	Manuel Arroyo	—	
1943	41–48	4th	Willie Wells / Santos Amaro	—	
1944	40–47	5th	Porfirio Martínez / Manuel Arroyo	—	
1945	52–38	1st	Armando Marsans	—	
1946	56–41	1st	Armando Marsans	—	
1947	53–65	4th	Armando Marsans / Santos Amaro	—	
1948	34–33	3rd	Chile Gómez	—	Folded in mid-season
1971	79–65	6th	Miguel Sotelo		
1972	86–51	2nd	Pedro González		
1973	74–56	5th	Pedro González	Lost in Semifinals (Saraperos) 3–2	
1974	66–71	8th	Pancho Herrera	Lost in Quarterfinals (Unión Laguna) 4–1	
1975	73–62	6th	Benny Valenzuela	Won Serie del Rey (Córdoba) 4–1	
1976	66–68	8th	Benny Valenzuela / Ronnie Camacho		
1977	57–97	15th	Clemente Carreras / Benny Valenzuela		
1978	76–78	8th	Benny Valenzuela	Lost in Quarterfinals (Saltillo) 4–2	
1979	79–75	15th	Félipe Leal / Carlos Trevino		
1983	57–55	7th	Felipe Hernandez / Roberto Casellon		
1984	54–56	10th	Gregorio Luque		
1985	66–64	9th	Gregorio Luque	Lost in Quarterfinals (Aguascalientes) 4–0	
