= Lázaro Salazar =

Cuban baseball player and manager (born 1912)

- Outfielder / First baseman / Pitcher / Manager
- Born: February 4, 1912; Havana, Cuba
- Died: April 25, 1957 (aged 45); Mexico City, Mexico
- Batted: Left Threw: Left

Negro leagues debut
- 1930, for the Cuban Stars (West)

Last Negro leagues appearance
- 1936, for the New York Cubans

Negro National League I, East–West League & Negro National League II statistics
- Batting average: .303
- Hits: 161
- Home runs: 9
- Runs batted in: 72

Teams
- Cuban Stars (West) (1930); Pollock's Cuban Stars (1932); Cuban Stars (East) (1933–1934); New York Cubans (1935–1936); Cafeteros de Cordoba (1938–1939); Azules de Veracruz (1940–1941); Industriales de Monterrey (1942–1948); Sultanes de Monterrey (1949–1952)

Career highlights and awards
- Cuban Baseball Hall of Fame (1954); Mexican Professional Baseball Hall of Fame (1964); Venezuelan Baseball Hall of Fame and Museum (2010)

Member of the Cuban

Baseball Hall of Fame
- Induction: 1958

Lázaro Salazar Vázquez (February 4, 1912 – April 25, 1957) was a Cuban professional baseball outfielder, first baseman, pitcher, and manager in the Negro leagues, playing four major league seasons with the Western Cuban Stars (1930), Pollock's Cuban Stars (1932), and the New York Cubans (1935–1936). He also spent much of his career outside the United States, playing and managing in Mexico and Venezuela.

== Career ==
Salazar was born on 4 February 1012 in Havana, Cuba. He played for 21 seasons from 1924 to 1952, sometimes as a player-manager, with the Cuban Stars (West), Pollock's Cuban Stars, and New York Cubans of the Negro leagues, and the Cafeteros de Córdoba, Azules de Veracruz, Industriales de Monterrey and Sultanes de Monterrey of the Mexican League. In the Cuban League, he won the batting title in the 1934–35 season, hitting .407.

Salazar also played and managed in Venezuela for much of his career. While pitching for the Gavilanes club, he was part of the longest contest in Venezuelan baseball history, a 20-inning game that lasted 6 hours and 20 minutes. Salazar eventually lost the pitching duel to Andrés Julio Báez, who played for Pastora, 1–0. The game took place in Maracaibo on May 5, 1938.

He later managed the Navegantes del Magallanes of the Venezuelan Professional Baseball League for seven consecutive seasons from 1949 through 1956, leading the squad to championship titles in the 1949–1950, 1950–1951, 1951–1952 and 1954–1955 campaigns.

Salazar's number 17 is retired by the Sultanes de Monterrey and the Diablos Rojos del México, and he was inducted into the Magallanes team hall of fame in 2012. Additionally, he has been enshrined in three national baseball Halls of Fame: the Cuban Baseball Hall of Fame (1954); the Mexican Professional Baseball Hall of Fame (1964); and the Venezuelan Baseball Hall of Fame and Museum (2010).
