= Ramón Bragaña =

Cuban baseball player (born 1909)

- Catcher / Outfielder / Third baseman / Pitcher / First baseman
- Born: May 11, 1909; Havana, Cuba
- Died: May 11, 1985 (aged 76); Las Choapas, Veracruz, Mexico
- Batted: Right Threw: Right

Negro leagues debut
- 1928, for the Cuban Stars (East)

Last Negro leagues appearance
- 1937, for the Cuban Stars (East)

Negro leagues (Note: On December 16, 2020, Major League Baseball declared the Negro leagues, from the span of 1920–1948, to be a "Major League". Bragaña's statistics reflect his time in the Negro leagues from 1928, his rookie year.) statistics
- Batting average: .217
- Home runs: 1
- Runs batted in: 5
- Win–loss record: 0–3
- Earned run average: 8.56
- Strikeouts: 7
- Stats at Baseball Reference

Teams
- Cuban Stars (East) (1928; 1937); Stars of Cuba (1929–1930)

Member of the Cuban

Baseball Hall of Fame
- Induction: 1959

Ramón "El Profesor" Bragaña Palacios (May 11, 1909 – May 11, 1985) was a Cuban professional baseball catcher, outfielder, third baseman, pitcher, and first baseman in the Negro leagues and the Mexican League.

A native of Havana, Cuba, Bragaña played professionally from 1928 to 1955, mostly with the Cuban Stars (East) (1928–1930), the Azules de Veracruz (1940–1951), and the Águila de Veracruz (1955). He was elected to the Cuban Baseball Hall of Fame in 1959, and the Salón de la Fama del Beisbol Profesional de México in 1964.

== See also ==
- List of members of the Mexican Professional Baseball Hall of Fame
