= Tuneros de San Luis Potosí =

Information
- League: Mexican League (1946–2006)
- Location: San Luis Potosí, San Luis Potosí
- Ballpark: Estadio 20 de Noviembre
- Established: 1946
- Folded: 2007
- Colors: Blue and gold

Current uniforms
Home

The Tuneros de San Luis Potosí (English: San Luis Potosí Prickly Pear Pickers) were a professional baseball team in the Mexican League based in San Luis Potosí, Mexico. The club played during 16 seasons spanning 1946–2006.

The first Tuneros team played from 1946 through 1952 in the Mexican League. After 13 years of absence, another club with a similar name played in the Mexican Central League from 1960–1962 and once more in 1971. Then, they joined the expanded Mexican League from 1986–1990; played as the Reales de San Luis Potosí in 1991, and again as the Tuneros from 2004–2006.

The Tuneros enjoyed their only winning season in 1971, when they won the MCL Central Division title with a 45–27 record but lost the final Series. After that, no team from San Luis Potosí has ever won a title in Mexican baseball.

== Notable players ==
- Sharnol Adriana (2005–2006)
- Francisco Alcaraz (1950)
- Shane Andrews (2004)
- Mario Arencibia (1950)
- Darryl Brinkley (2005–2006)
- Paul Calvert (1947)
- Avelino Canizares (1947–1948)
- Alberto Castillo (2004–2005)
- Juan Cerros (2005)
- Jorge Comellas (1946)
- Tommy de la Cruz (1947)
- Martin Dihigo (1947)
- David Doster (2005)
- Leon Durham (1991)
- Héctor Espino (1960–1961)
- Bobby Estalella (1946–1947)
- Pedro Formental (1946)
- Chico García (1946–1947; 1949)
- Steve Gerkin (1949)
- Roland Gladu (1947)
- Chile Gómez (1949–1951)
- Vince Gonzales (1951)
- René González (1947; 1949; 1951)
- Red Hayworth (1947)
- Gil Heredia (1989)
- Rudy Hernández (1971)
- Bobby Herrera (1946)
- Darren Holmes (1988)
- Mike Kinnunen (1990)
- Jack Lazorko (1990)
- Brian Looney (2004)
- Isidro Márquez (1986–1988)
- Agapito Mayor (1948)
- Gabe Molina (2005)
- René Monteagudo (1947–1949)
- Bobby Moore (1991)
- Roy Partlow (1950)
- Ramón Peña (1991)
- Héctor Rodríguez (1949; 1951–1952)
- Barney Serrell (1948)
- Walter Silva (2004)
- Luis Tiant, Sr. (1948)
- Efraín Valdez (1986)
- Jeff Zaske (1988)

== Notes ==
- In Spanish language, the term tunero (too-neh'-ro) refers to a prickly pear picker.
- The legendary slugger Héctor Espino, considered by many as the greatest player in Mexican baseball history, started his professional career with the Tuneros in the 1960 Mexican Central League season.

== Sources ==
- Johnson, Lloyd; Wolff, Miles (1993). Encyclopedia of Minor League Baseball. Baseball America. ISBN 978-0-96-371898-3
- Treto Cisneros, Pedro (2002). The Mexican League/La Liga Mexicana: Comprehensive Player Statistics, 1937-2001. McFarland & Company. ISBN 978-0-78-641378-2
