= Azules de Veracruz =

Baseball team from Veracruz, Mexico (1940–1951)

Information
- League: Mexican League (1940–1951)
- Location: Veracruz, Mexico; Mexico City
- Ballpark: Parque Deportivo Veracruzano (1940); Parque Delta (1941–1951)
- Established: 1940
- Folded: 1951
- League championships: 4 (1940, 1941, 1944, 1951)
- Colors: Blue and white

Current uniforms
Home

The Azules de Veracruz (English: Veracruz Blues) were a professional baseball team that played in the Mexican League from 1940 to 1951. Originally from Veracruz, Mexico, the team relocated to Mexico City shortly after its foundation, while keeping the Veracruz name. Under the ownership of Jorge Pasquel (who also briefly served as league president during this time), Azules won league championships in 1940, 1941, 1944 and 1951.

== History ==
=== 1940s ===
The Azules de Veracruz were established in 1940 by Jorge Pasquel, a prominent businessman and baseball fan born in Veracruz. Pasquel named his team Azules and chose blue as the club's color, to compete with the other team from Veracruz: El Águila de Veracruz. Pasquel also hired Martín Dihigo as the team's first player-manager, who had previously played for El Águila in 1939.

El Águila and Cafeteros de Córdoba did not approve Pasquel's actions to have another team in Veracruz and split from the Mexican League, forming another competition known as Liga Cismática (Schismatic League), where they were joined by Alijadores de Tampico, Agrario de México, Tigres de Comintra and Puebla. However, Pasquel bought the Parque Deportivo Veracruzano for his Azules to play, leaving El Águila without a baseball park. The Azules, however, only played a few games in Veracruz and later moved to the Parque Delta in Mexico City, that was also bought by Pasquel, where the team would play until its disappearance ten years later.

The Azules won their first championship in 1940 by finishing the season first with a record of 61 wins and 30 losses. The team repeated as Mexican champions in 1941 with Lázaro Salazar as manager in what was considered one of the best teams in Mexican baseball history. In 1942, the team finished last. In 1944, the Azules won their third championship under manager Ramón Bragaña.

== Year-by-year record ==
Year	Record	Finish	Manager	Playoffs	Notes
1940	61-30	1st	Martín Dihigo	League Champions	
1941	67-35	1st	Lázaro Salazar	League Champions	
1942	39-46	6th	Agustin Bejerano	none	
1943	39-51	5th	Gustavo Buenrostro / Horacio Hernández	none	
1944	52-37	1st	Rogers Hornsby / Ramón Bragaña	League Champions	
1945	42-48	5th	Ramón Bragaña	none	
1946	41-57	7th	Ramón Bragaña / Mickey Owen / Chile Gómez / Jorge Pasquel	none	
1947	52-67	6th	Chile Gómez / Red Steiner	none	
1948	43-43	5th	Dolf Luque	none	
1949	42-42	4th	Salvador Hernández	none	
1950	34-50	7th	Ramón Bragaña	none	
1951	49-35	1st	Ángel Castro	League Champions	

== Notable players ==
- Ace Adams
- Cool Papa Bell
- Ramón Bragaña
- Ray Brown
- Alex Carrasquel
- Tony Castaño
- Buzz Clarkson
- Ray Dandridge
- Tommy de la Cruz
- Leon Day
- Martín Dihigo
- Bobby Estalella
- Harry Feldman
- Pedro Formental
- Silvio García
- Danny Gardella
- Josh Gibson
- Chile Gómez
- Vince Gonzales
- Roy Henshaw
- Chico Hernández
- Bobby Herrera
- Rogers Hornsby
- Monte Irvin
- León Kellman
- Lou Klein
- Max Lanier
- Rufus Lewis
- Agapito Mayor
- Fernando Barradas
- Charlie Mead
- René Monteagudo
- Julio Moreno
- Baby Ortiz
- Mickey Owen
- Roy Partlow
- Paul Pettit
- Ted Radcliffe
- Armando Roche
- Héctor Rodríguez
- Lázaro Salazar
- Pat Scantlebury
- Red Steiner
- Vern Stephens
- Willie Wells

Sources Baseball Reference
