= Cafeteros de Córdoba =

Mexican League baseball team

Information
- League: Liga Mexicana de Beisbol
- Location: Córdoba, Veracruz
- Ballpark: Estadio De Béisbol Beisborama 72
- Founded: 1937
- League championships: 2 (1939, 1972)

The Cafeteros de Córdoba (English: Córdoba Coffee Growers) were a Mexican League baseball team that played on-and-off, in various incarnations, from 1937 to 2006, based in Córdoba, Veracruz.

The team played on and off for a duration not last more than a decade:

- 1937 to 1939
- 1972 to 1979
- 1984 to 1986
- 1991 to 1992
- 1998 to 2003
- 2006

== Championships ==
It won the league championship in 1939 and 1972. Led by player-manager Lázaro Salazar, the Cafeteros won the 1939 Mexican League championship by finishing first with a 46–12 record.

== Ballpark ==
Other than the first two seasons, the team has played its home games at Estadio De Béisbol Beisborama 72, nicknamed. Caníbal Park. From 1937 to 1939 the team played at Parque Cuauhtémoc de Monterrey in Monterrey.

== Roster ==
- Juan Bell 1999–2000
- Pete Rose Jr. 2003

== New Cafeteros (2007) ==
The team name re-emerged in 2007 in the Veracruz Winter League and plays at the same stadium.
