= Angeles Negros de Puebla =

Former baseball club

Angeles Negros De Puebla (Puebla Angels or Puebla Black Angels)

Information
- League: Angeles Negros De Puebla
- Location: Puebla, Mexico
- Ballpark: Estadio de Béisbol Hermanos Serdán
- Founded: 1972
- Folded: 1987
- Serie del Rey championships: 1979, 1986
- Former ballpark: Estadio de Beisbol Ignacio Zaragoza
- Colors: Green, White, and Yellow

The Angeles de Puebla, or Angeles Negros de Puebla ("Angels of Puebla" or "Black Angels of Puebla"), was a baseball club which were very successful in their short time in the Mexican League. The Pericos de Puebla had left the Liga in 1969, and when a new team took their place in 1972, they used a new name.

After winning a division title in 1975, the team finished with the best record in the league in both 1976 and 1977, but made a first-round exit from the playoffs all three years. In 1979 they won the Liga pennant and in 1980 had the best record in the league when it was shut down by a strike in mid-season. The Angeles were one of the teams that did not take part in the restarted season, and did not return to the league in 1981.

In 1985, the Angeles returned to the Mexican League, but after what the owner considered a bad season, he renamed the team as the Angeles Negros ("Black Angels"). Following the name change, the team hit .347 and scored over seven runs a game in the offensive explosion of 1986 in Mexico. Willie Aikens put up one of the most memorable seasons in League annals and the Angeles won their second title.} The Angeles left town after just one more season, as another championship failed to translate into long-term roots.

The team became the Charros de Jalisco in 1988. The Pericos de Puebla returned to the Mexican League in 1993, but a weak team lasted only three seasons before disappearing again. The Pericos returned to Puebla once again in 2000.

== Year-by-year record ==
Year	Record	Finish	Manager	Playoffs
1972	72-65	6th	Miguel Sotelo / Pedro Ramos	
1973	71-62	6th	Tomas Herrera / Jorge Calvo / Raul Cano	
1974	81-56	3rd	Tony Castano	Lost in 1st round
1975	80-58	4th	Tony Castano	Lost in 1st round
1976	80-55	1st	Clemente Carreras	Lost in 1st round
1977	96-54	1st	Raul Cano	Lost in 1st round
1978	85-65	4th (t)	Raul Cano	
1979	86-51	2nd	Jorge Fitch	League Champs
1980	63-25	1st	Jorge Fitch / Rosendo Domínguez	Season stopped by strike
1985	70-54	5th	Max Oliveras	
1986	88-41	1st	Rodolfo Sandoval	League Champs
1987	71-52	2nd	Rodolfo Sandoval / Roberto Mendez	
