= Pericos de Puebla =

Mexican professional baseball team

Logo	Cap insignia

Information
- League: Mexican League
- Location: Puebla, Puebla
- Ballpark: Estadio de Béisbol Hermanos Serdán
- Established: 1938; 88 years ago (original); 2000; 26 years ago (modern incarnation)
- Nickname: La novena emplumada (The Feathered Ninth)
- Serie del Rey championships: 5 (1963, 1979, 1986, 2016, 2023)
- Former name: Ángeles Negros de Puebla
- Former ballpark(s): Parque Puebla (1938–1951); Estadio Ignacio Zaragoza (1952–1972)
- Colors: Green and gold
- Mascot: Pepe Perico and Aquiles
- Ownership: Grupo PRODI
- President: Ignacio Trigueros Tirado
- Manager: Sergio Omar Gastélum
- Website: pericosdepuebla.com

Current uniforms
Home	Away

The Pericos de Puebla (English: Puebla Parrots) are a professional baseball team in the Mexican League based in Puebla. Their home ballpark is the Estadio de Béisbol Hermanos Serdán. Established in 1938, the Pericos have won five Mexican League championships in 1963, 1979, 1986, 2016, and 2023.

== History ==
The state of Puebla came upon baseball in the early 1920s when returning Poblanos that had come from military service who were based in the north of Mexico brought back with them this new sport which they share with the locals. Which the natives practice in their spare time spurning up numerous of amateurs baseball teams around the state.

In 1922, General Andrés Zarzosa Verástegui founded an amateur baseball club Almazán de Puebla All former Puebla baseball clubs who went down to Mexico City to play exhibition games against the amateurs clubs from the state. In 1924 General Juan Andrew Almazán now owner of the club relocated in Mexico City. No one took charge of the club and so it was forgotten. Players from that first club were Ramón Artola, Jacinto Jaquinet, Ramón Montes de Oca, Felipe Cázares among others.

In 1925, with people excited and in love with this new sport a new baseball league was created founded by the General Alejandro Aguilar Gómez and so the state of Puebla had its first professional baseball club. Andrés Zarzosa was the founder and owner of 74 Regimiento baseball club that represent the state of Puebla which made its home in the city of Atlixco. The clubs that founded this new league were Agrario, Guanajuato, El Nacional de Bisckler, El México and Puebla's own 74 Regimiento. Some of the first idols in their first year were Center fielder Oscar Martínez, Catcher Hakino, Shortstop Javier Pérez and Pitcher Gómez coached by the Cuban Jesús "Matanzas" Valdez. 74° Regimiento was the first ever baseball champion in 1925. This club later was relocated in San Luis Potosí where they never again won a championship.

They have existed on and off since 1942 in various other leagues. They are one of the many clubs that have represented the state of Puebla since 1924, among them Almazán de Puebla in 1922, 74 Regimiento in 1924, who also was the first champion of the Liga Mexicana de Béisbol, Club De Béisbol Hudson, in 1938, where they got their uniform colors green and white from. The club played in the Liga Invernal Veracruzana from 1949 to 1959. In 1958 they lost the title against Poza Rica and in 1959 won their first title. The clubs won a total of 4 Liga Mexicana de Béisbol: 1 in 1924 as 74 Regimiento, 2 as Ángeles Negros in 1972 and 1986 one as Pericos de Puebla in 1963. The club plays their home games in the Estadio de Béisbol Hermanos Serdán which is right next to the Estadio Cuauhtémoc were Puebla F.C. has made their home since 1972 when they left the old Estadio Ignacio Zaragoza where they played from 1942 to 1971. From 2002 to 2006 the Pericos shared their home park with the Tigres de la Angelópolis from Mexico City. The Tigres club won a championship in 2005 to later transfer in 2006 to Quintana Roo Yucatán with whom they keep a strong rivalry.

- First Baseball tournament held in Mexico were 74 Regimiento was crown the champion in 1924.

Club	Position	Games won	Games Lost
74 Regimiento	1	10	6
México	2	10	6
Agraria (Carmona)	3	8	6
Nacional	4	7	7
Guanajuato	5	5	9
Águila	6	0	10

=== 1940s ===
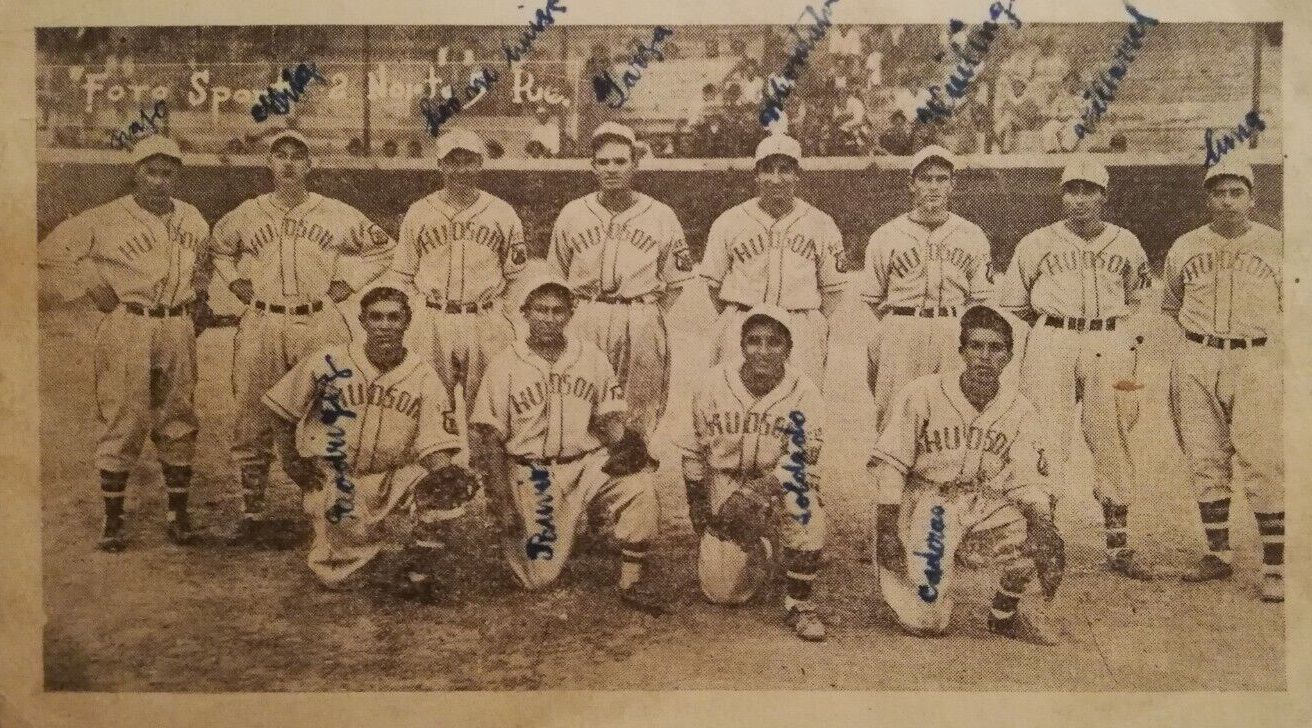
Hudson de Puebla 1938

In 1938, a third recognized semi professional club existed in the state of Puebla: it was Club De Béisbol Hudson founded by Sir Delfino Pérez. The club's colors were green and white. In 1939 the club was sold to Don Castor a local car dealership owner who changed the club's name to Chevrolet and that same year entered the club in the Mexican League this was the first team that represented the city of Puebla. The club's uniform was white with the club's name Chevrolet in the middle of the shirt with blue numbers. They played from 1939 to 1941 when they won the Winter league title.

Players from that Chevrolet team were Roberto Villarreal, Beto Ávila, Colin, Pedro Meza, Leopoldo Cervantes el "Rábano", Ángel Castro, Guillermo Fritche, Bernardo López, Domingo Figueroa, Vidal Romero el "Chachapa", Rafael Pedroso, el "Zungo", Juan Luna, Mario Cruz, Fernando Galina, Apolinar Pulido "Polin", Emiliano Sarda and Mario Collazo

In 1942, the club changed its name to Pericos(parrots) this name change was made in order to attract more people. They took up the name Parrots due to the customs of the upper class, which every wealthy household had a talking parrot at the front door. Between 1942 and 1946 the league consisted of 6 teams from Mexico City, Veracruz, Monterrey, Nuevo Laredo, Tampico, and Puebla. More teams joined: San Luis Potosí in 1946 and Torreón in 1947. In 1948 due to the lack of championship titles the fans stop going to the games and so Sr. Delfino Pérez come to a decision where he retrieved the team from the league which lasted for 4 years.

=== 1950s ===
In 1952, the club made its return with owners Don Alejo Peralta y Díaz Cevallos now playing in their brand new Estadio Ignacio Zaragoza which had a capacity of 25,000. The starting line up for the first game was Chuck Genovés as coach and Shortstop first basement Al Grunwald, Pitcher José Bache, The outfielders were Alejandro "Cañitas" Moreno, Gustavo Fernández, Chuck Buheller y Otilio Cruz. The pitching reserves were Michel Gabès, Memo López, Ramiro Caballero, Indio Beltrán, Emilio Ferrer and Porfirio Castillo catching Bob Knock.

Budddy Baker and Charles Drummond, respectively, joined the team in the middle of the season, as well as George and Esteve Boros who also joined the club at the end of the season. With a good quantity of star players, the cub finish in last place.

In 1957, Pericos de Puebla sign a work trade contract with Major League Baseball club Baltimore Orioles who send to Puebla as lone manager Jimmy Adair along with catcher Sam Hairston, shortstop Ron Hansen who stay was short before returning to play in the MLB where he became an icon playing for the Baltimore Orioles and Chicago White Sox.

In 1958, Puebla finally reach a final facing Poza Rica club from the state of Veracruz. The championship game was held in Puebla in the Estadio Ignacio Zaragoza in front of 25,000 fans waiting for Puebla to lift its first cup since 1925. But history would have it otherwise it was in the 10th inning when poza rica score the 2 winning runs that would give them the title. The final score was 5–3. The following year on February 15, 1959, Puebla finally won the awaited championship which also mark the last season puebla played in the Liga Invernal Veracruzana. Puebla played Liga Invernal Veracruzana from 1949 a 1959

=== 1960s ===
In 1960, Puebla buys out the franchise from Nuevo Laredo and this way they secure a spot in the Mexican League again. Which in 1961 they finish runner up to Rojos del Águila de Veracruz, in 1962 they finished 4th managed by José Guerrero "El Zacatillo".

In 1963, the club wins its first Mexican League title under the name Pericos managed by Antonio "Tony" Castaño with key players Ronaldo Camacho, Moisés Camacho, Daniel Bankhead, Jorge Fitch, Oscar Rodríguez among others. This was the club's third official title in all leagues they had taken part of. Later the club saw the arrive of their key pitcher, the Italian pitcher Carlos Minutti from the Italian commune and small city Chipilo de Francisco Javier Mina, Puebla although a second Sicilian generation, he originated from Palermo, Sicily.

In 1964 and 1965, respectively, the club finished runner up first to Diablos Rojos del México in 1964 and Tigres del México in 1965 also managed by Antonio "Tony" CastañoIn 1967 the team finished in last place under the management of José Luis García. In 1968 the team finished 4th under the management of Tony Castaño. In 1969 the club due once again to its poor play left Puebla to Yucatán for 3 years under the management of Tony Castaño.

=== Ángeles de Puebla ===
==== 1970s ====
In 1972, the club return to the city of Puebla with new owners Emilio Tame and William Budid and with a new name Ángeles Negros de Puebla, under the management of Miguel Sotelo, and this was the last year the club played in the Estadio Ignacio Zaragoza where they had been playing on and off since 1952.

On June 16, 1973, the club played its first game in their brand new Estadio de Béisbol Hermanos Serdán against Piratas de Savinas, winning 6–0 with a shout out pitched by Arnulfo Adame, who finished the year with a record of 15–10. Teolindo Acosta had the first hit in the game. The first run was scored by Francisco Castro with Tomás Herrera as the first manager winning the first game. The club finished in 4th place that year. The club's player of the year was Acosta, who won the leagues batting title finishing the years with .366 batting average with 170 hits. Besides, Aurelio Monteagudo won the pitching title with an undefeated record of 12–0.

In 1974, Tony Castaño returned as manager, leading the club to the first playoffs played in the new Estadio de Béisbol Hermanos Serdán finishing 2nd in the south division. The club was disqualified after losing to Diablos Rojos del México in the first round.

In 1975, the club finished fourth with a record of 81–56 and qualified to the 1975 playoff where they faced the Diablos Rojos del México. The club was knocked out in the first round by the Diablos Rojos, managed by Castaño, in which would be his last year with the club.

In 1976, with new manager Clemente Carreras, once again the club won their division with a record of 88 wins 55 losses and an 11-game advantage over the runner up Rieleros de Aguascalientes. In the playoff they faced the Diablos Rojos del México for the third consecutive year and loss once again in the first round. The club had in their squad the rookie of the year in Alfonso 'Houston' Jiménez González who showed his abilities at shortstop and quickly became a fan favorite.

In 1977, the club once again won its division for the third time and qualified to the 1977 playoff with a record of 96 wins 54 losses best record in the league and the club's best record to date under the management of Raúl Cano. This time they faced Cafeteros de Córdoba in the first round who shock the league by knocking off the best club that year. That same year the club won for the second year rookie of the year with the pitcher Abraham Rivera who finished with a record of 12–4 and an era.

In 1978, the club finished tied in fourth place in the south east division and so did not qualify, the club finished the season with an 85–65 record. The manager was Cano, who was in his second and last season as manager of Puebla.

In the 1979 season, after a year off not reaching the playoffs, the club was again change owners and name as well from Pericos to Ángeles de Puebla. The club hires manager George Fitch in the off season as well. With a new name, new owners along with a new manager the club wins its third Mexican League title the third under a different name. The club won its 4th division title finishing second in the league with a record of 85–51. The club faces the Plataneros de Tabasco in quarterfinals and wins the series in 4 games. In the South division sires the club faces Cafeteros de Córdoba which they beat easily in 4 games and so gaining some retribution from the 1977 quarterfinal series. The final was played against Indios de Ciudad Juárez, the series began on September 6, 1979, in a game that the Indios won 3–0 over Puebla. The second game was played the following day. In a strong pitching effort, César Díaz hurled 12 innings, allowing seven hits, one walk and just one run. The final score was a 2–1 victory for Puebla, tying the series at one apiece. The third game was played in Ciudad Juárez, where once again Puebla came out with a victory. The fourth game went to the Indios in a 3–1 victory, and once again tying the series. The fifth game when to Indios as well in a 4–1 victory on September 10, 1979. Two days later, in a game played at home, Puebla came out with a 6–2 victory and so tying the series at three games, setting a dramatic game 7. This game was played on September 14 in a jam packed Estadio de Béisbol Hermanos Serdán, as Puebla won in a 3–0 shutout and gave the state its third championship.

==== 1980s ====
During the off season, the club signed Rodolfo 'Rudy' Sandoval as the new head coach, also signing foreign players Willie Mays Aikens, David Stockstill, Donald Carter and Orlando Sánchez, as well as Mexicans Guillermo 'Tiburón' Rodríguez, Miguel Ángel Castelán and so building up a competitive squad in order to repeat as champions. Puebla had the best record in the league with a 63–25 record till mid season when the players and the owners had economical differences which ended in a player strike. The league restarted in 1981 but Puebla was one of the few clubs that didn't make that return.

In 1985, the club returned to the league with manager Mako Oliveras. The club finished fifth in their division with a record of 70–54 and missed the playoffs. After a bad season the owners decided to change the club's name to Angeles Negros de Puebla which in English translated to Black Angels.

In 1986, the new name Ángeles Negros de Puebla seem to work that year the club hit for a combined average of .347 and score an average of seven runs per game which was the best offensive in 1986. Aikens had a memorable year that would give the club its fourth title managed by Sandoval. The Ángeles finished first in their division with a record of 88–41. In quarterfinals they beat the Diablos Rojos, and in semifinals defeated the Tigres de México. In the finals, they beat the Sultanes de Monterrey. Some players from this championship season were Porfirio Mendoza and the aforementioned Aikens, Sánchez, Stockstill and Carter. the starting pitchers were Jaime Orozco, Germán Jiménez, Martín Camarena and Isaac Jiménez. This year Puebla set numerous league records for a team with a .347 batting average, a .531 slugging percentage and 907 runs scored. The 1986 Ángeles were recognized as one of the 100 greatest minor league teams of all time.

In 1987, the Ángeles Negros played its last year in Puebla before being bought and moved to Jalisco. That year the club finished second in their division but failed to make it to the playoff with a record off 71–52 coached by Bernardo Calvo and replaced by Moisés Camacho at mid season.

==== 1990s ====
In 1993 the club made its return this time with its original name Pericos de Puebla. The club had a bad year, winning only 52 games. In 1994 the club had an even worse year. This time they only managed to win 33 games, losing 96. In 1995 the club kept struggling, which keptthe stadium nearly empty the whole year. After the 1995 season, the owners decided to sell the club, which became the Langosteros de Cancún. Professional baseball would not be played again in Puebla until 2000.

=== 2000–present ===
In 2000, the club made its return after 5 year absent by the hands of the new owner local businessman Ricardo Henaine Mezher bought the Rieleros de Aguascalientes franchise therefore giving the club a spot in the top division once again. He also declared that he wanted to bring back that mystique the club had in its early days, to have a club to be proud of and not let it disappear ever again. The club hired manager Enrique Reyes García who only lasted 5 games as head coach before being replaced by José Juan Bellazetin. With players such as Guillermo Velásquez, Pedro Iturbe, Jesús Arredondo, Albino Contreras, Lorenzo Buelna and Pitchers Pablo Ortega, Armando Valdez, Rich Kelley, Alonso Beltrán, Azael Álvarez, and José Juan Núñez. The club finished the season with an acceptable record but fail to qualify to the playoffs.

In 2003, after almost 28 years of a professional club not playing a playoff game the club finished 4th in its division with a record of 62–48. The club faced their usual open in Diablos Rojos del México without 2 of their star players, Pablo Ortega and Lorenzo Buelna, who were playing in the 2003 Pan American Games with Mexico. The clubs each won 3 games sending the series to a game 7 in which Puebla came 3 outs from winning, before Pedro Cervantes allowed 3 runs in the last inning to lose the game 8–7, as well as the series 4–3.

In 2002, with high expectations after a successful preseason they played in Atlixco. The club started the year off by losing 12 of their first 22 games. With all this at hand the club struggled to find the right equation but weren't able, so on May 15 manager "Piri" Bellazetín was let go and replaced by Eddie Castro who was quickly let go as well and replaced by Marco Antonio Guzmán. The club finished last in their division with a record of 38–70 which was the third worst record in club history.

In 2004, the state of Puebla welcomed in Tigres who played in the same ballpark as Pericos. Fans from Puebla (city) quickly began cheering for Tigres while people from around the state continued supporting Pericos. The rivalry between the two clubs became known as the Civil War in Puebla. Pericos finished the season with a 63–34 record. In the quarterfinals they managed to knock off Aguascalientes in 6 games. In the semifinals the club lost the series to Saraperos de Saltillo in 6 games.

In 2005, the club had a bad year, meanwhile their hometown rivals Tigres won the league title, which flared up rumors about the club's future weather if the city could sustain 2 baseball clubs having each club average a low attendance that year.

The Club bounced back in 2006, having one of their finest regular seasons ever. They finished second in the North Division with a record of 64–44. In the first round they met their rivals, the Saltillo Saraperos, once again and were upset, falling to Saltillo 4 games to 3.

In 2007, with the departure of Tigres who played in Puebla from 2002–2006 to Quintana Roo leaving the state with one club. Pericos had a terrible year, finishing in the bottom 3.

In 2008, it got even worse for Los Pericos. The team finished with a dismal record of 43-75 and ended in 7th place in the North Division.

In 2009, the Pericos had a fine year, relying on the strong arm of starting pitcher Andres Meza who won 15 games, they finished almost twenty games over .500 at 62–43. In the first round of the playoffs they upset the Leones de Yucatán four games to one, but lost in the second round to the Tigres de Quintana Roo, four games to one.

In 2010, Pericos had another great year, going all the way to the championship but falling to Saraperos de Saltillo in five games.

In 2011, the Pericos finished fourth in the North Division with a record of 53-53 and qualified for the playoffs. However, they lost in the 1st round to Mexico City, four games to two.

In 2012, the Pericos failed to qualify for the playoffs, en route to a 6th-place finish, with a 52–57 record.

In 2013, the Pericos finished third in the North Division under Manager Alfonso 'Houston' Jiménez with a record of 58–48. The club featured Batting Average Champion Luis Mauricio Suárez who finished the year hitting .413 and was known as the Amigo de Hit! Unfortunately, the club lost in the first round of the playoffs to Monterrey, three games to one.

In 2014, the Pericos finished second in the South Division under manager Joe Alvarez with a record of 61–48. They beat Campeche in the first round of the playoffs and then upset their rivals, the Tigres de Quintana Roo to advance to the Championships, where they fell to Mexico City in a four-game sweep.

After the 2014 season, Pericos were sold to Monclova mining magnate Gerardo Benavides Pape. Benavides was intent on upgrading the Pericos to be one of the top teams in the LMB in all aspects, from maintaining a competitive on-field product, upgrading the stadium experience and being active in the community. In order to develop young talent, Benavides created a minor league farm system by acquiring the Frontera Rieleros of the Liga Coahuila, and struck an affiliation deal with the Algodoneros de San Luis Rio Colorado of the Liga Norte (the top minor league in the country). He also developed a Baseball Academy in Monclova to bring in high potential youth players and give them the facilities, focus, and coaching to develop to their fullest capability. He also recognized the growing interest in Mexican players, markets and fan bases from Major League Baseball, in the United States. In order to foster and capitalize on closer relations with MLB, and build out the club's player development system, Pape installed one of the top minor league General Managers from the U.S. in Texas-native and Mexican-American Jose Melendez.

In the 2015 season, Pericos started slow and replaced American manager Von Hayes with Mexican legend Matías Carrillo early in the campaign. He went on to lead the team to playoffs for the sixth time in seven seasons, but suffered a first round defeat, losing a 3-2 contest to the Campeche Pirates. Even in the first year under Benavides, the Pericos improvements were being seen as import players included All-Star Game Home Run Derby Champion Brent Clevlen, former American League Most Valuable Player Miguel Tejada and 15-year Major League closer Kyle Farnsworth. In the off-season the new player development plans took shape as the Pericos' new Monclova Academy had instructors that included Washington National's Manager Dusty Baker, former White Sox Manager Ozzie Guillén, Atlanta Braves legendary pitching coach Leo Mazzone, former Chicago Cubs pitcher Les Lancaster, two-time National League All-Star catcher Ozzie Virgil Jr., San Francisco Giants great Chris Speier and many more. In addition, Benavides made extensive improvements to the 43 year old Stadium Hermanos Serdán to make the games even more fun for the fans and families of the Perico supporters. The beautiful upgraded stadium was ready on time for opening day of the 2016 season.

== Year-by-year record ==
The Angeles de Puebla, which in 1986 became Ángeles Negros de Puebla, played from 1972 to 1987. In 1993, the club made its return as the Pericos Puebla. From 1972 to 1995 the club won a total of 1,080 regular season games, lost 871 regular season games, and won 4 South East division titles and 2 Mexican League titles.

Year	Record	Finish	Manager	Playoffs
1972	72–65	6th	Miguel Sotelo / Pedro Ramos	Did not qualify
1973	71–62	6th	Tomás Herrera / Jorge Calvo / Raúl Cano	Did no qualify
1974	81–56	3rd	Tony Castaño	Lost in first round
1975	80–58	4th	Tony Castaño	Lost in first round
1976	80–55	1st	Clemente Carreras	Lost in first round
1977	96–54	1st	Raúl Cano	Lost in first round
1978	85–65	4th (t)	Raúl Cano	Did not qualify
1979	86–51	2nd	Jorge Fitch	League Champions
1980	63–25	1st	Jorge Fitch / Rosendo Domínguez	Season stopped by strike
1985	70–54	5th	Max Oliveras	Did not qualify
1986	88–41	1st	Rodolfo Sandoval	League Champions
1987	71–52	2nd	Rodolfo Sandoval / Roberto Mendez	Did not qualify
1993	52–74	14th	Bernardo Calvo / Miguel Gaspar / Gregorio Luque	Did not qualify
1994	33–96	16th	Bernardo Calvo / Moisés Camacho	Did not qualify
1995	52–63	12th	Francisco Estrada	Did not qualify

== Roster ==
Pericos de Puebla roster
Players		Coaches/Other
Pitchers: 41 (Venezuela) Silvino Bracho; 32 (Venezuela) Liarvis Breto; 74 (Venezuela) Yoimer Camacho; 72 (Brazil) Tiago da Silva; 53 (Cuba) Vladimir Gutiérrez ∞; 38 (Mexico) Fernando Lozano; 56 (Venezuela) José Martínez; 22 (United States) Tyler McKay; 26 (United States) Hunter McMahon; 35 (Dominican Republic) Emailin Montilla; 29 (Venezuela) Cleiverth Perez; 68 (Mexico) Erick Preciado; 52 (Mexico) Édgar Rodríguez; 30 (Venezuela) Nomar Rojas; 76 (Mexico) Iván Salas ∞; 51 (Dominican Republic) Edgar Santana ∞; 46 (Dominican Republic) Antonio Santos; 6 (United States) Mark Simon; 57 (Mexico) Édgar Torres; 49 (Dominican Republic) Emilio Vargas; 70 (Mexico) Daniel Zazueta	Catchers: 44 (Mexico) Gerardo Castañeda ∞; 55 (Dominican Republic) Michael de la Cruz; 15 (Mexico) Juan Kirk; 45 (Mexico) Daniel Mercado; Infielders: 13 (Dominican Republic) Cristhian Adames; -- (Dominican Republic) Sergio Alcántara; 18 (Venezuela) Luis Castro; 43 (Mexico) Miguel Guzmán; 12 (Mexico) Samar Leyva; 7 (Mexico) Ciro Norzagaray; 66 (Mexico) Brayan Quintero; 60 (Venezuela) José Rondón; 27 (Dominican Republic) Estamy Urena ∞; Outfielders: 8 (Venezuela) Lorenzo Cedrola; 39 (Mexico) Rogelio Cobos; 50 (Mexico) Sebastián Elizalde; 19 (Puerto Rico) Henry Ramos; 17 (Venezuela) Herlis Rodríguez	Manager: 25 (Mexico) Ramón Orantes; Coaches: -- (Mexico) Matías Carrillo (outfield); 37 (Mexico) Miguel Duarte (bullpen); -- (Mexico) Cornelio García (hitting); -- (Mexico) Cecilio Garibaldi (pitching); -- (Mexico) Alfonso Jiménez (first base/infield); -- (Venezuela) Gabriel Luckert (pitching); -- (Venezuela) Luis Maza (third base); -- (Mexico) Pedro Meré (bench); -- (Venezuela) Kevin Nieves (catching); 28 (Mexico) Humberto Rojas (assistant); -- (Mexico) Luis Mauricio Suárez (hitting); -- (Mexico) Tomás Solís (assistant); 7-day injured list; ~ Development list; # Rehab assignment; ∞ Reserve list; ‡ Restricted list; § Suspended list; † Temporarily inactive list; Roster updated August 4, 2026; Transactions; → More rosters: MiLB • Mexican League

== Notable players ==
1939–1941

- Beto Ávila
- Pedro Meza
- Bernardo López
- Juan Luna
- Mario Cruz
- Mario Collazo

1952–1953

- Al Grunwald
- José Bache
- Ponpa Olvera
- Cañitas Moreno
- Gustavo Fernández
- Chuck Buheller
- Otilio Cruz
- Michel Gabès
- Memo López,
- Ramiro Caballero
- Indio Beltrán
- Emilio Ferrer
- Porfirio Castillo
- Bob Knock

1959–60

- Luis Trucios
- Luis Antonio Medina "El jarocho"
- Cristóbal Torres
- Felipe Olivera Sr. "El Pipo"
- Antonio Pino Mondragón
- Joaquín Bianchini
- Salvador Bianchini
- Jaime Tanús
- Lucio Ibarra
- Felipe Olivera
- Sebastían Rosales
- Roberto Vargas
- Carlos Minutti
- Rodrigo Múñoz
- Andrés de la Fuente
- Enrique Esquivel
- Fausto Vergara.

1963 Champions

- Eladio Urías "el Pollo"
- Raúl Sánchez
- Oscar Rodríguez
- Ángel Toledo "Cuco"
- Alejandro Moreno "el Cañitas"
- Rodolfo Sandoval González
- Jorge Fitch
- Joseph Tylor
- José Guerrero Cano "Zacatillo"
- Pedro Cardenal
- Moisés Camacho Muñiz "Moi"
- Ronnie Camacho
- Víctor Osuna
- Guadalupe Cansino
- Daniel Bankhead "Dan"
- Ultus Álvarez
- Dalton Thomas W.

Pitchers

- Carlos José Méndez
- Julio Moreno "Jiquí"
- Miguel Sotelo
- Mauro Ruiz
- Florentino Rivera
- Raúl Sánchez
- Antonio Díaz "Tony"
- Daniel Bankhead
- Juan Suby
- Héctor Olguín
- Ernest Williams
- Jorge Figueroa
- Rosendo Domínguez
- Alfredo Mariscal Hurtado

Position players

- Nate Freiman
- Delmon Young

1986 Champions

- Willie Mays Aikens
- Orlando Sánchez
- David Stockstill
- Donald Carter
- Porfirio Mendoza
- Jaime Orozco
- Germán Jiménez
- Martín Camarena
- Isaac Jiménez

== Mascots ==
The Pericos de Puebla have two mascots: Pepe Perico and Aquiles. Pepe Perico, a parrot, was first introduced in 2009 and won a recognition as the best mascot in the Mexican League, voted by fans, in 2020. A new mascot was introduced in 2020, known as Aquiles.

== Mexican Baseball Hall of Famers ==
The following Hall of Famers played and/or managed for Puebla.

Name	Position	Year of induction
Beto Ávila	Second baseman	1971
Ronaldo "Ronnie" Camacho	First baseman	1983
Moisés Camacho	Second baseman	1986
Miguel Sotelo	Pitcher	1985
José "Zacatillo" Guerrero	Third baseman	1989
Oscar Rodríguez	Outfielder/Center fielder	1993
Francisco "Paquín" Estrada	Catcher	2000
Rodolfo "Rudy" Sandoval	Catcher	2001
Jorge Fitch	Shortstop	2001
Juan Suby	Pitcher	2013
