= Corito Varona =

Cuban baseball player

Plataneros de Tabasco
- / Manager
- Born: March 26, 1910; Cienfuegos, Cienfuegos, Cuba
- Died: February 24, 1999 (aged 88); Veracruz, Veracruz, Mexico
- Batted: Right Threw: Right

CL debut
- 1926, for the Cienfuegos

Last CL appearance
- 1936, for the Cienfuegos
- Stats at Baseball Reference
- Managerial record at Baseball Reference

Teams
- As player: Cienfuegos (1926–1936); As manager: Cienfuegos (1937–1953); Tigres de Aguascalientes (MCL (1963); Plataneros de Tabasco (MSL) (1964); As scout: Cincinnati Reds (1954); Los Angeles Dodgers (1979)

Career highlights and awards
- Mexican Southeast League champion (1964)

Camilo Saturnino Varona Dorticós (March 26, 1910 – February 24, 1999), nicknamed Corito, was a Cuban professional baseball scout and former player and manager. After playing for the Cienfuegos of the Cuban League (CL), he transitioned into managing the team after an arm injury forced him to retire in 1936. He went on to manage the Tigres de Aguascalientes of the Mexican Center League (MCL) in the first part of 1963, and in 1964 led the Plataneros de Tabasco to the Mexican Southeast League (MSL) championship with a 52–35 record.

In 1954, Varona began working as a scout for the Cincinnati Reds of Major League Baseball (MLB) in the United States after the American team signed an agreement with the Havana Sugar Kings, and assisted Havana with signing players such as Tony Pérez, Cookie Rojas, and Mike Cuellar. Varona fled Cuba following the Cuban Revolution and Fidel Castro's rise to power, seeking refuge in Mexico in 1963, where he was hired by Tigres de Aguascalientes.

While managing Tigres de Aguascalientes, Varona signed Vicente Romo, who would go on to debut in MLB with the Los Angeles Dodgers, and also directed the Dodgers towards José Peña, Iván DeJesús, Orlando Álvarez, Pepe Frías, and Fernando Valenzuela, among others.
