= Estadio de Béisbol Hermanos Serdán =

Stadium in Puebla, Mexico

Estadio Hermanos Serdán
- El Serdán
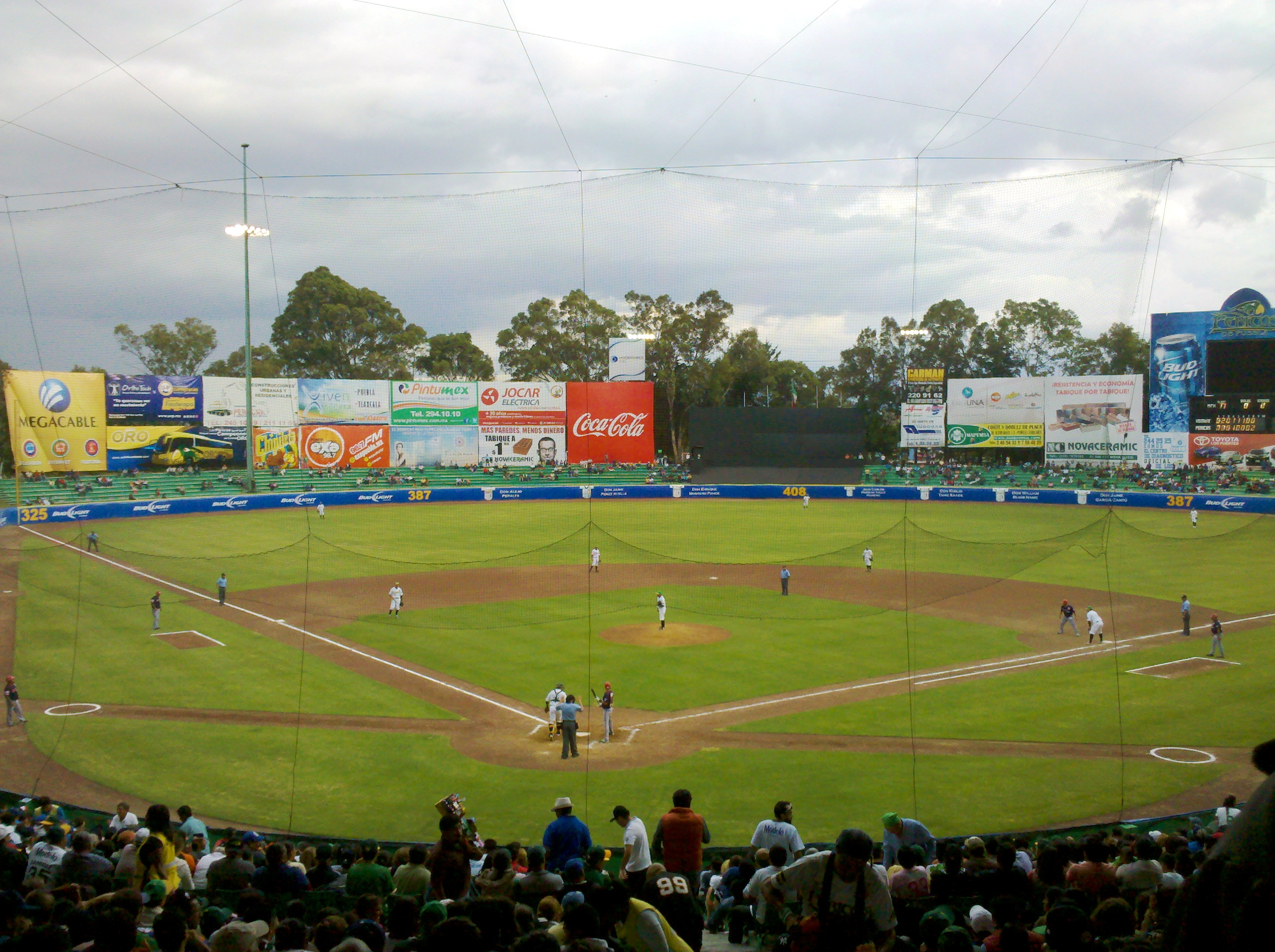
- Interactive map of Estadio Hermanos Serdán
- Location: Puebla, Puebla, Mexico
- Coordinates: 19°4′31.29″N 98°9′53.64″W
- Capacity: 9,200
- Surface: Grass

Construction
- Groundbreaking: 1972
- Opened: 16 June 1973

Tenants
- Pericos de Puebla (1973–present); Angeles Negros de Puebla (1973–1980, 1985–1987); Tigres de la Angelópolis (2002–2006)

Estadio Hermanos Serdán (English: Serdán Brothers Stadium) is a stadium in Puebla City, Mexico. It is primarily used for baseball, and is the home field of the Pericos de Puebla of the Mexican League. It holds 9,200 people. It is named to honor the Serdán brothers (Aquiles, Carmen, Máximo and Natalia), Pueblan politicians and supporters of the Mexican Revolution.

Home of Pericos de Puebla Mexican League baseball team since 1973, also when the club was known as Angeles Negros and Ángeles de Puebla and recently it has been the home of Tigres de la Angelópolis from 2002 to 2006, when they left the city of Puebla to move to Cancún, Quintana Roo.

The stadium was inaugurated on 16 June 1973 with the first ball thrown by the governor of the city at that time Guillermo Morales Blumenkron, accompanied by the commissioner of the league Alejo Peralta. In that first game Pericos de Puebla defeated Piratas de Sabinas 6–0.

== History ==
It was 2 in the afternoon on July 16, 1973, when the governor of Puebla Lic. Guillermo Morales Blumenkron threw the first pitch accompanied by the municipal president Luis Vázquez Lapuente and the commissioner Alejo Peralta y Díaz Ceballos, along with the owners of the club Emilio Tame y William Budib with Enrique Montero Ponce who was an important person in the construction of the stadium and who help the city financially.

That day the home club Pericos de Puebla under the management of Tomás Herrera faced the Piratas de Sabinas in a 4-game series in which the first when to the home team with a victory of 6–0. The first victory pitched by Arnulfo Adame was the first in the stadium history the first loss went to Francisco Rivas. Teolindo Acosta was the first player to get a hit in the park Francisco Castro was the first player to score the first run.

The stadium has seen five league finals in its history two by Ángeles de Puebla in 1979 and in 1986 (As Angeles Negros), in 2010, in 2014, also one by Tigres de la Angelópolis in 2005 the five finales were owned by the local team. On 14 May 1987, the stadium held its first all-star game number 50 between the Selección Sur (South Division) and the Selección del Norte (North Division). Pitchers for the south were Jesús "Chito" Ríos, followed by Herminio Domínguez, Fredy Arroyo and the closer Salomé Barojas. North division pitchers were Adolfo Navarro, followed by the lefty Isidro Morales, Jesús Moreno, Fernández Fuson, Martín Kaine, Antonio Pulido and Ezequiel Cano. The loss went to Adolfo Navarro; the most valuable player award went to Jesús "Chuchín" González.

== Concert events ==
Aside from baseball games several other events have been held in the stadium over the years.

- Maná – 29 February 2008
- Julieta Venegas – 8 November 2008
- Tiësto – December 10, 2008
- Los Tigres del Norte – November 13, 2009
- Internacional Festival de Puebla – 15–16 November 2009
- WWE SmackDown – 16 October 2009 and May 7, 2010
- Guerra de Titanes – 16 December 2011

== See also ==
- Gimnasio Miguel Hidalgo – basketball arena in Puebla
- Estadio Cuauhtémoc – association football stadium in Puebla
