= Arnoldo Castro =

Mexican baseball player (1939–2013)

- Second baseman / Shortstop / Third baseman
- Born: 11 January 1939; Guasave, Sinaloa, Mexico
- Died: 16 December 2013 (aged 74); Guasave, Sinaloa, Mexico
- Batted: Right Threw: Right

Member of the Mexican Professional

Baseball Hall of Fame
- Induction: 1995

Arnoldo Lavagnino "Kiko" Castro (11 January 1939 – 16 December 2013) was a Mexican professional baseball infielder who is in the Mexican Baseball Hall of Fame.

== Career ==
Castro played in the Mexican Baseball League from 1958 to 1983 for the Dorados de Chihuahua (1958), Tigres de Aguascalientes (1960–1961), Diablos Rojos del México (1960), Tigres de México (1962–1970, 1977–1978, 1980), Piratas de Sabinas (1971–1973), Mineros de Coahuila (1974–1976) and El Águila de Veracruz (1983). He managed the Plataneros de Tabasco for the latter part of the 1980 season, replacing Raúl Cano, and in 1983 he skippered the Dorados de Chihuahua. He was elected to the Mexican Professional Baseball Hall of Fame in 1995.

== Death ==
He was born and died in Guasave, Sinaloa, Mexico.
