= Alacranes de Durango (baseball) =

There are three Minor League Baseball clubs named Alacranes de Durango (Durango Scorpions) in Mexican Baseball History.

In all its incarnations, the Alacranes have represented the city of Durango, the capital, and the largest city of the Mexican state of Durango. Since the classification of minor leagues began, they have been labeled as classes C, A and AAA in a span of 12 seasons from 1956 to 1979. The name is traditional for all sports teams from Durango, as its association football club is also called the Alacranes.

In 1978, Joel Pérez won the Mexican League Rookie of the Year Award, he became the only player in the history of the club to receive such honour.

Besides, Durango is known nationally and even internationally as the Land of the Scorpions (Tierra de los Alacranes), due to abundant species of scorpions on its territory, especially in the colonial areas.

== Alacranes de Durango chronology ==
Year	League	Class	Record	Finish	Manager	Notes	Ref
1956	Mexican Central League	C	45-54	5th	Salvador Sahuayo; Tribilín Cabrera		
1957	Mexican Central League	C	52-48	3rd	Virgilio Arteaga		
1965	Mexican Center League	A	66-72	4th	Regino García; Francisco Martínez		
1966	Mexican Center League	A	67-69	5th	Francisco Martínez		
1967	Mexican Center League	A	45-95	8th	Epitacio Torres		
1972	Mexican Center League	A	34-35	4th	Guillermo Frayde		
1973	Mexican Center League	A	25-43	8th	Felipe Hernández	[1]	
1974	Mexican Center League	A	52-23	1st	Manuel Fortes	[2][3]	
1976	Mexican League	AAA	54-79	15th	Ossie Álvarez; Jorge Fitch; Al Gallagher		
1977	Mexican League	AAA	77-71	7th	Benjamin Cerda	[4]	
1978	Mexican League	AAA	85-65	4th (tied)	Benjamin Cerda	[5]	
1979	Mexican League	AAA	58-74	16th	Benjamin Cerda		

1. Served as a farm club for AAA Algodoneros del Unión Laguna
2. Served as a farm club for AAA Charros de Jalisco
3. Won Championship
4. Lost in 1st round of playoffs
5. Lost in 1st round of playoffs

== Notable players ==
- Kim Allen (1976)
- Jim Bouton !(1977)
- Jim Breazeale (1976)
- Ted Ford (1976–1977)
- Wayne Granger (1977)
- Jerry Hairston (1979)
- Rudy Hernández (1976)
- Jeff Holly (1976)
- Max León (1979)
- Buck Leonard (1956)
- Roberto Méndez (1976–1979)
- Bill Moran (1976)
- Ivan Murrell (1976)
- Tom Norton (1976)
- Reggie Sanders (1977)
- Ray Torres (1977–1979)
- Earl Williams (1979)
