= 1964 Mexican Baseball League season =

1964 Mexican League season
- League: Mexican League
- Sport: Baseball
- Duration: 26 March – 16 August
- Teams: 8
- Season champions: Diablos Rojos del México

LMB seasons
- ← 1963 1965 →

The 1964 Mexican League season was the 40th season in the history of the Mexican League. It was contested by eight teams. The season started on 26 March and finished on 16 August. Diablos Rojos del México won their second championship after finishing first with a 82–58 record, three games ahead of the Pericos de Puebla, led by manager Tomás Herrera.

The competition format was the same used since the 1952 season where the team with the best win-loss record by the end of the season would be the champion.

== Standings ==
1964 Mexican League standings
Pos	Team	W	L	Pct.	GB
1	Diablos Rojos del México	82	58	.586	—
2	Pericos de Puebla	79	61	.564	3.0
3	El Águila de Veracruz	78	62	.557	4.0
4	Tigres de México	76	63	.547	5.5
5	Petroleros de Poza Rica	70	70	.500	12.0
6	Sultanes de Monterrey	66	74	.471	16.0
7	Broncos de Reynosa	61	79	.436	21.0
8	Charros de Jalisco	47	92	.338	34.5

== League leaders ==
Batting leaders
Stat	Player	Team	Total
AVG	(Mexico) Héctor Espino	Monterrey	.371
HR	(Mexico) Héctor Espino	Monterrey	46
RBI	(Panama) Bobby Prescott	Poza Rica	123
R	(Mexico) Héctor Espino	Monterrey	118
H	(Mexico) Alfredo Ríos	Monterrey	189
SB	(Mexico) Armando Murillo	Tigres	21

Pitching leaders
Stat	Player	Team	Total
ERA	(Panama) Fernando Osorio	Veracruz	2.56
W	(Mexico) Miguel Sotelo	Puebla	17
K	(Cuba) Ramón López	Monterrey	213

== Awards ==
Award	Player	Team	Ref.
Rookie of the Year	(Mexico) Elpidio Osuna	Poza Rica	
