= Serdan =

Serdan may refer to:

- Serdan, alternate name of Sirdan, a city in Iran
- Serdán (disambiguation), various meanings, including as a surname
