= Tomás Herrera =

Tomás Herrera is the name of:

- Tomás de Herrera (1804–1859), Central and South American statesman and general
- Tomás Herrera Martínez (1950–2020), Cuban basketball player
- Tomás Herrera (baseball)
- Tomás Herrera (ranchero) - Nuevo Mexico born immigrant to Alta California.
