= Piratas de Sabinas =

Information
- League: Mexican League (1971–1973)
- Location: Sabinas, Coahuila
- Ballpark: Estadio de Béisbol David Yutani (1971–1973)
- Established: 1971
- Folded: 1973
- Colors: Black, gold and white

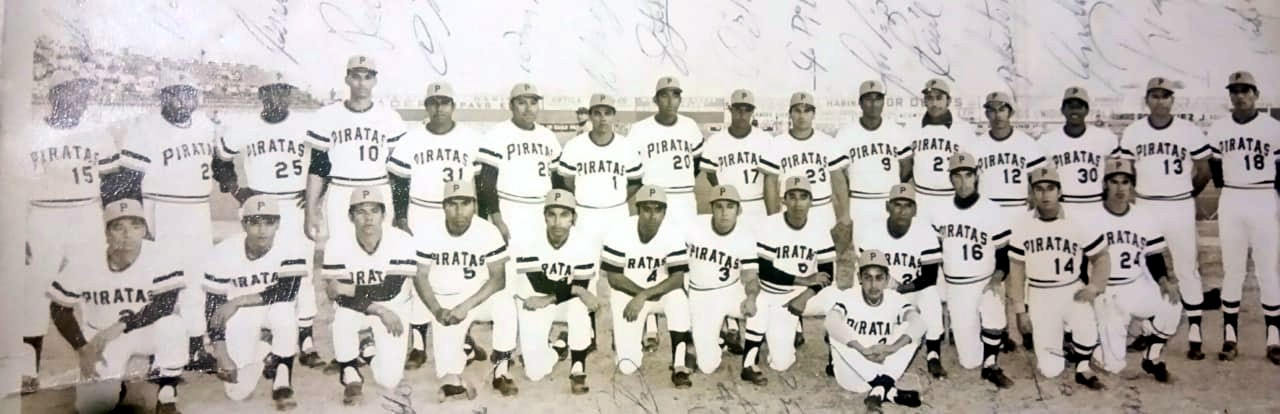
The 1971 Piratas de Sabinas

The Piratas de Sabinas (English: Sabinas Pirates) were a professional baseball team in the Mexican League based in Sabinas, Coahuila. Established in 1971, the club played three seasons in the Mexican League before folding at the end of the 1973 season, when they were replaced by the Mineros de Coahuila. The Piratas' visual identity was an outright copy of that of the Pittsburgh Pirates.

== History ==
The Piratas de Sabinas joined the Mexican League as an expansion team in 1971 and were assigned to the North Division with the following teams: Algodoneros de Unión Laguna, Alijadores de Tampico, Broncos de Reynosa, Saraperos de Saltillo and Sultanes de Monterrey. For their first season, the Piratas hired Arnoldo Castro and Rodolfo Sandoval amongst others. The team made its debut in the Mexican League against the Saraperos de Saltillo in the Estadio de Béisbol David Yutani in Sabinas.

The club had three losing seasons during its time in the Mexican League. In 1971, they finished with 62–83 record; in 1972, they went 62–76; and in 1973, their final season, they posted a 51–81 record, never qualifying for the playoffs.

The team folded after the 1973 season and was replaced by the Mineros de Coahuila for the 1974 season. The Mineros played their inaugural game in Sabinas on 21 March 1974 before relocating to Monclova two days later, on 23 March, where they currently play as the Acereros.

== Season-by-season ==
Season	League	Finish	Won	Lost	Playoffs	Ref.
1971	Mexican League (North)	5th	62	83	Did not qualify	
1972	Mexican League (North)	4th	62	76	Did not qualify	
1973	Mexican League (North)	7th	51	81	Did not qualify	
