= Raymundo Torres =

Raymundo Torres may refer to:

- Raymundo Torres (boxer) (1941–1972), Mexican boxer
- Raymundo Torres (footballer) (born 1984), Mexican footballer
- Ray Torres (1958–2012), Mexican baseball player
