= Serdán =

Serdán may refer to:

- Aquiles Serdán (1876–1910), a Maderista Mexican politician and revolutionary from Puebla who took part in the first action of the Mexican Revolution
- Aquiles Serdán Municipality, one of the 67 municipalities of Chihuahua in northern Mexico, named for the revolutionary
- Estadio de Béisbol Hermanos Serdán, a stadium in Puebla, Mexico
- Puebla International Airport, officially Hermanos Serdán International Airport (IATA: PBC, ICAO: MMPB), an international airport near Puebla, Mexico
- Huitzilan de Serdán, a town and municipality in Puebla in south-eastern Mexico
- Metro Aquiles Serdán, a station in the Line 7 of the metro of Mexico City
- Ciudad Serdán, town in Puebla, Mexico
