= Jorge Calvo =

Jorge Calvo may refer to:

- Jorge Calvo (baseball) (1938–2009), Mexican baseball player and manager.
- Jorge O. Calvo (1961–2023), Argentine geologist and paleontologist.
