= Rosendo Domínguez =

Mexican baseball player

Rosendo Dominguez (born c. 1940) played in Mexico professionally in 1963, 1964 and 1968. He spent time in the Mexican Center League, the Mexican Southeast League and the Mexican League, the highest level of professional baseball in Mexico.

He managed the Mexican League's Ángeles de Puebla for part of the 1980 season, replacing Jorge Fitch.
