= Lobos BUAP =

- Full name: Club de Fútbol Lobos de la Benemérita Universidad Autónoma de Puebla
- Nicknames: Los Lobos (The Wolves); La Manada (The Pack); Los Licántropos (The Lycanthropes)
- Founded: 28 May 1967; 59 years ago (as Carolinos UAP)
- Dissolved: 11 June 2019; 7 years ago
- Ground: Estadio Universitario BUAP; Puebla
- Website: clublobosbuap.com
Home colours	Away colours

Club de Fútbol Lobos de la Benemérita Universidad Autónoma de Puebla, simply known as Lobos BUAP or Lobos, was a Mexican professional football club based in Puebla. The club last competed in Liga MX, the top division of Mexican football, and played its home matches at the Estadio Universitario BUAP.

The club's origins date back to the early 1930s, when it was known as Preparatoria and consisted exclusively of players attending the university. After competing intermittently over the following decades, the club was formally established as Carolinos UAP in 1967 and became one of the founding members of the Tercera División. In 1996, the club changed its name and came to represent the Benemérita Universidad Autónoma de Puebla.

After years of playing in the lower divisions of Mexican football, in 2003, Lobos BUAP secured a place in the Primera División 'A' de México, where it remained until earning promotion to the top division in 2017. Following the Clausura 2019, the club folded and the franchise was sold and relocated to Ciudad Juárez, Chihuahua, becoming Juárez.

== History ==
=== Early BUAP soccer teams ===
The club's history dates back to 1930 when the club was known as Preparatoria, composed exclusively of players that attended the university. It was not until 1966 when the Federación Mexicana de Fútbol (FMF) allowed the club to join the Tercera División de México; the club played under the name Carolinos UAP, named for the university's main building that today houses the rector's office.

By 1969, Rafael Moreno Valle owned the team. He left the club to become one of the owners of Puebla, the other major local team in the city. Management was taken over by the university's Department of Physical Studies of Puebla. The club failed to be sustained economically and folded in 1971. The final match was placed in the Copa México, on August 22, 1971.

=== Lobos BUAP ===
In the mid-1990s, during the term of José Doger Corte as rector, Eduardo Rivera Hernández and Paul Moreno pitched the idea of buying a franchise in the Segunda División de México for the university. The brothers Adolfo and Pedro Ayala later joined the board of directors, with Ayala as the club's executive president.

It was made clear that the club should only consist of Players attending the university. The club played its first game in the Estadio Ignacio Zaragoza and was managed by a former Puebla player Gustavo Moscoso. Lobos was the first Segunda División club ever to air its games on broadcast television, with Televisa Puebla airing twelve games on television in Puebla. The Federación Mexicana de Fútbol congratulated the owners board for setting a good example on how a club should be run by doing so inspired other Segunda División clubs to do the same.

In its first season, the club performed very poorly, but the next year, Lobos battled for a spot in the playoffs against the Águilas of the Universidad Popular Autónoma del Estado de Puebla (UPAEP), a private university in Puebla.

The club would fold three years later due to the club's poor performance; the university was unable and owners were not willing to spend more money on a club that was headed nowhere. The main economic support at the time came from a group of Engineers who decided to leave the club, leaving the university without a soccer team for almost two months.

A new rector and a new business leader, Alberto Ventosa Coghlan, quickly revived the franchise. Coghlan secured an agreement with the Primera División de México club Necaxa to have Lobos as a Segunda División affiliate. Mario Marin, the new mayor of the city of Puebla helped the club as did Leopoldo García, former director of Televisa Puebla, who would be named executive president. Despite a season in which two players, Carlos Muñoz and Emmanuel Sacramento, tied for the league lead in goals with 15, and good players including Gerardo Espinoza and Luis Gabriel Rey, who would later go on and win various championships with Atlante, the new club failed to catch on, and after two seasons of very poor play, Grupo Pegaso relocated the team to the city of Oaxaca, Oaxaca and renamed it Chapulineros de Oaxaca.

=== Modern club ===
In 2002, Enrique Doger Guerrero, acting rector of the university, revived the club under the name Lobos de la B.U.A.P.

Managed by Evanivaldo Castro, a former Brazilian player who had played in the first division in the 1970s – 1990s, the club was admitted into the Segunda División. After failing to reach the playoffs in their first season, Evanivaldo Castro was replaced by Víctor Valdemar Marine for the following tournament. The team improved immensely under Marine, reaching the playoffs before being eliminated in the quarterfinals by Delfines de Coatzacoalcos. That season also saw the team move into their new home, Benito Juárez García Field, in the San Baltazar Campeche borough of Puebla. Along with a new home, the team also got increased exposure after agreeing to a deal with national cable company Megacable to have all home games broadcast locally.

In 2003, the club had a great year, winning almost all of its home games, finishing first in the south zone and qualifying to the playoffs, where they defeated Interplaya de Ciudad del Carmen and Jaguares de Villaflores. The club played the semifinal in the Estadio Cuauhtémoc against Club Deportivo Autlán who they also beat. The club would go on to win that tournament. It lost to Pachuca B in the promotion playoff game, but the team was still promoted: that same year, Salamanca was not able to pay its players and folded, which left a spot open, which was awarded to the runner-up Lobos.

In the 2009 Liga de Ascenso Apertura, the club had one of its most successful campaigns to date, finishing runner up in the league with a record of 8–4–4 for a total of 28 points, just four less than Irapuato. In the quarterfinals the club played against Potros Neza, winning both legs. In the semifinals, Lobos fell to recently relegated Necaxa 2–0 on aggregate, with both Necaxa goals being scored in the Estadio Victoria in the city of Aguascalientes, Aguascalientes.

In the 2010 Liga de Ascenso Bicentenario, the club just managed to qualify to the playoffs after finishing seventh in the league with a record of 7–3–6 for a total of 24 points. In the quarterfinals the club played Necaxa again. Despite a scoreless tie in the Estadio Cuauhtémoc, Necaxa won in the match in Aguascalientes on their way to another title. Necaxa would later go to win the title again and would automatically earn its promotion to the Primera División de México just a year later.

In the 2010 Liga de Ascenso Apertura, under the management of Carlos Poblete, the club managed to qualify to the quarterfinals with a record of 8–3–5. In the quarterfinals the club played against Tiburones Rojos de Veracruz; despite the two teams tying in the first match played at the Estadio Luis "Pirata" Fuente, Tiburones Rojos came out with a 1–0 win in the Estadio Cuauhtémoc to eliminate the Lobos.

With their fifth-place finish in the regular season, the 2012 Liga de Ascenso Clausura tournament saw Lobos BUAP make a final for the first time, beating Toros Neza 1–0 on aggregate with a goal scored at home and defeating Necaxa 3–1 in the semifinals. Against León, the Lobos tied 3–3 in Puebla but then lost 4–0 in the Estadio León.

=== Promotion to Liga MX ===
Lobos BUAP finished sixth in the 2017 Clausura tournament, earning it a playoff spot. In the quarterfinals, Lobos eliminated Alebrijes de Oaxaca with a 2–1 victory on aggregate. The semifinal round saw them defeat the Mineros de Zacatecas, which had finished with the best record in the regular season, in a resounding 6–2 victory. In the finals, they defeated Bravos de Ciudad Juárez by a score of 4–1 to win their first ever league title.

In order to win promotion to the Liga MX, however, Lobos would have to face the Dorados de Sinaloa, who had won the 2016 Apertura tournament. At the Estadio Universitario BUAP, the Lobos won 1–0, and a 2–2 tie at the Estadio Banorte in Culiacán, Sinaloa was enough to win the series and send Lobos to the Primera División for the first time.

In the 2017–18 season, Lobos BUAP played its first season in the Primera División, however, the team resented its great lack of experience and its very low budget, so it was relegated category at the end of the season. Lobos BUAP was able to continue in the Liga MX after paying a fine of 120 million pesos (6 million dollars), this after the winner of the Ascenso MX, Cafetaleros de Tapachula, was not certified to promote.

=== Relocations and failed return ===
In June 2019, Lobos BUAP had only four players to face the 2019–20 season. On June 11, it was announced that FC Juárez bought the Lobos BUAP franchise and relocated it to Ciudad Juárez, Chihuahua, taking its place in the Liga MX. The Lobos board was left with the license of Juárez. The university created a semi-professional squad called Cefor Lobos BUAP, which won the championship in their competition.

In June 2020, Lobos joined the newly created Liga de Balompié Mexicano after battling the Liga MX in court due to corruption accusations involving the sale of the team to Juárez. In August 2020, the return was canceled due to differences between the sports project board and the BUAP board. The franchise was moved to Zacatepec, Morelos and renamed as Lobos Zacatepec. However, on November 10, 2020, the team was disaffiliated by the LBM due to high debts.

== Season to season ==
Season	Division	Notes
1967–68	3rd Division	
1968–69	3rd Division	
1969–70	3rd Division	
1970–71	3rd Division	
1996–1997	2nd Division	
1997–1998	2nd Division	
Apertura 99	2nd Division	
Clausura 00	2nd Division	
Apertura 02	2nd Division	
Clausura 03	2nd Division	
Apertura 03	2nd Division	

Season	Division	GP	W	L	D	GS	GA	Dif	PTS
Apertura 04	Primera A								
Clausura 05	Primera A								
Apertura 05	Primera A								
Clausura 06	Primera A								
Apertura 06	Primera A								
Clausura 07	Primera A								
Apertura 07	Primera A								
Clausura 08	Primera A								
Apertura 08	Primera A	16	6	3	7	22	30	-8	21
Clausura 09	Primera A	16	6	7	3	24	17	+7	25
Apertura 09	Primera A	16	8	4	4	19	13	+6	28
Bicentenario 10	Primera A	16	7	3	6	17	22	-5	24
Apertura 10	Primera A	16	8	3	5	23	12	+11	27
Clausura 11	Primera A	16	4	3	9	26	34	-8	16
Apertura 11	Primera A	14	4	6	4	12	12	0	18
Clausura 12	Primera A	14	6	2	6	20	20	0	20
Apertura 12	Ascenso MX	14							
Clausura 13	Ascenso MX	14							
Apertura 13	Ascenso MX	14							

- Has Played 4 3rd Division tournaments last in 1971.
- Has Played 7 2nd Division tournaments last in 2003.
- Has Played 19 Primera A tournaments last in 2013.
- After the 1971 tournament, the club folded.
- In 1996, the club reappeared, then folded in 1997.
- In 1999, the club reappeared for the third time, then folded in 2001.
- In 2002, the club reappeared a fourth time, then folded in 2019.

== Stadium ==
The club started off playing its home games in the Estadio Cuauhtémoc in the late 1960s. By the early 1990s the club made the Estadio Ignacio Zaragoza its home. In 1999 the club had a stadium for themselves right next to the Benemérita Universidad Autónoma de Puebla with a capacity of 9,000. Due to the small stadium capacity, in 2007 the club was forced to move back to the Estadio Cuauhtémoc in order to meet the FMF Liga de Ascenso requirements, which requires a club to have a home stadium of at least 15,000.

In October 2011 it was announced that the Estadio Universitario BUAP would be finally have an expansion from 9,000 to 20,700, which is set to open in January 2012.

== Official jersey ==
=== Kit evolution and rare kits ===
- Home kit: White shirt with a blue sash, blue shorts, and white socks.
- Away kit: Blue shirt with a white sash, blue shorts, and socks.
- Manufacturer: Pirma (2011–2019).
- Previous manufacturers: Vento (1997–2002), Lotto (2002), Pirma (2003), Cruzeiro (2004–2006), Lotto (2007–08), Kappa (2009).

Prior to 2011, the club's uniform has always been in the university colors and has varied from green, yellow, gold, and blue. In 2007, after the club joined forces with local first-division club Puebla FC, the club used a sash that runs from the right shoulder to the left.

Then in 2011, the team switched to red, black, and white as their club colors. During their final years, they wore white shirts with red and black details plus white shorts and socks as their home uniform.

=== Past jerseys ===
First kit evolution Home

1967	1997	1998	2007	2009	2010

=== First kit evolution away ===
First kit evolution away

1967	1997	1998	2007	2009	2010

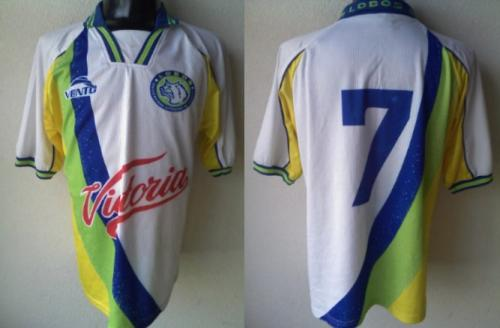
1999 Home

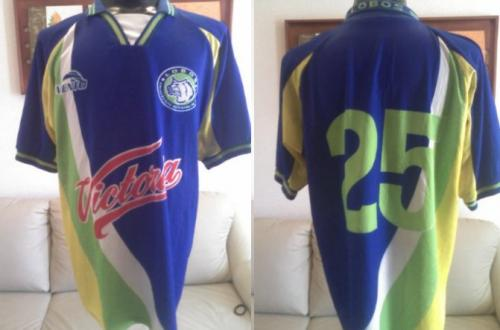
1999 Away

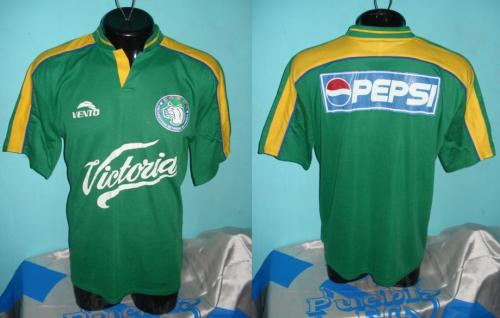
1999 Third

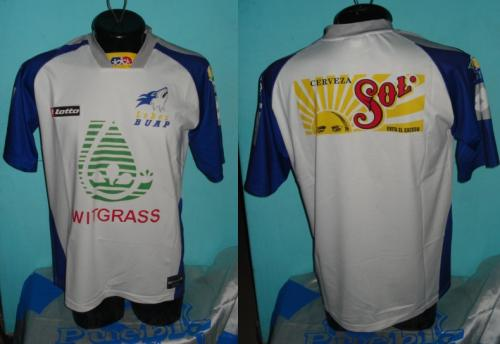
2002 Home

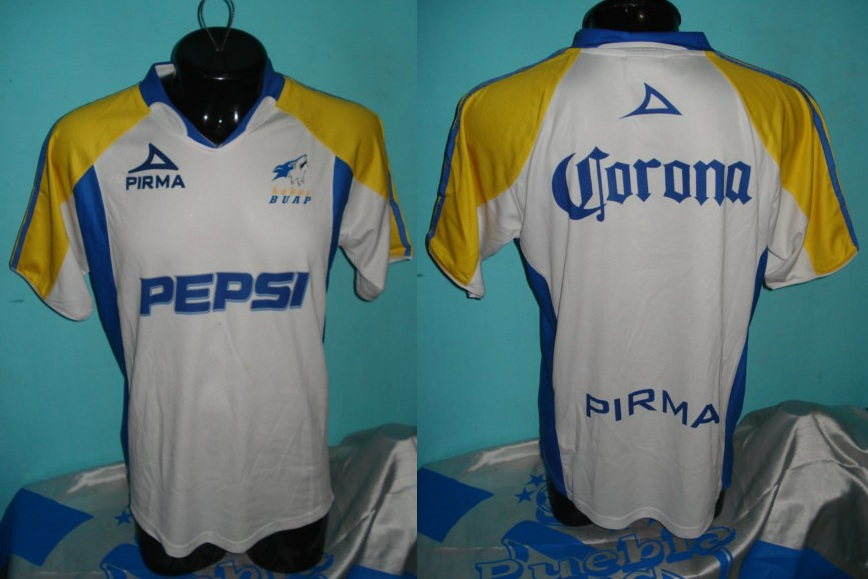
2003 Home

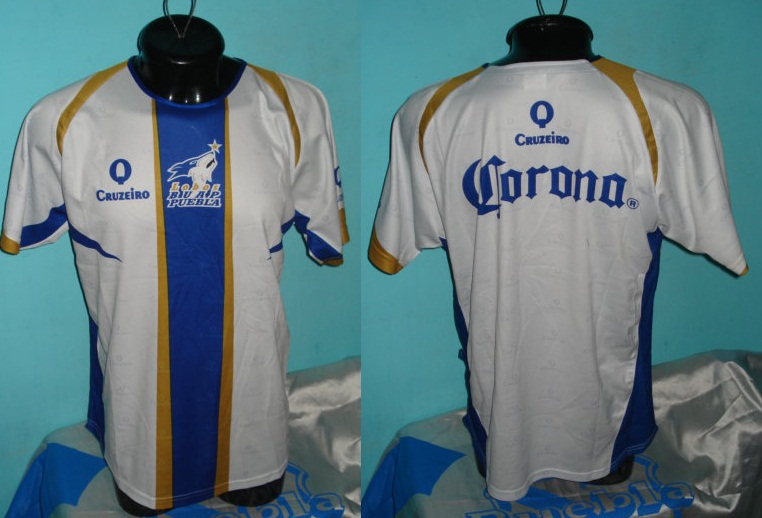
2004 Home

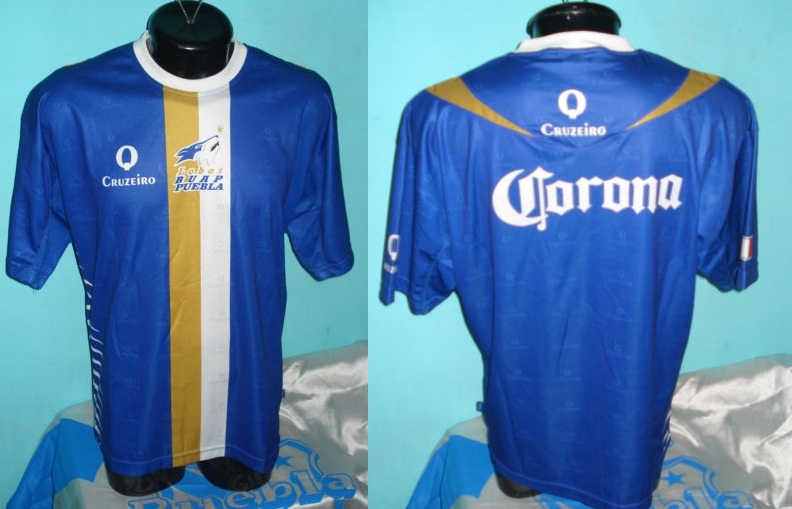
2004 Away

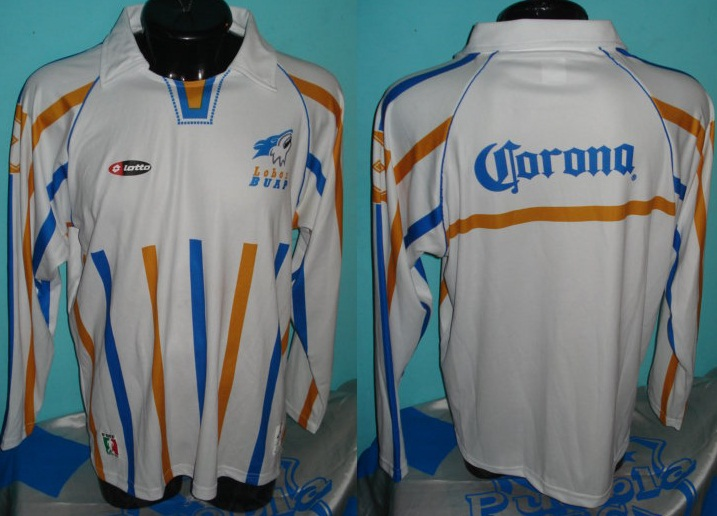
2007 Home

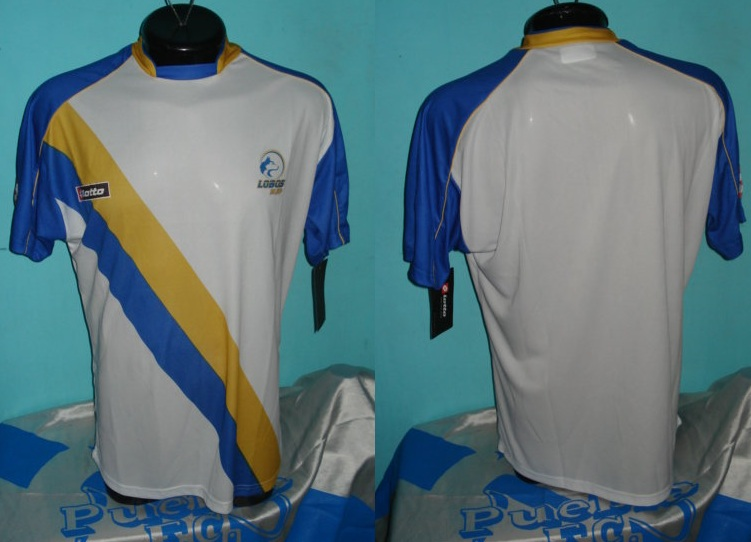
2008 Home

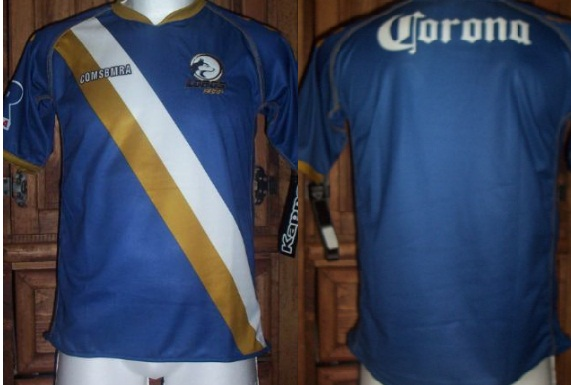
2008 Away

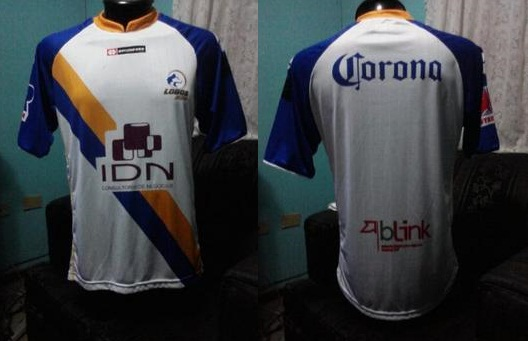
2009 Home

== Badge ==
The club's badge is a Wolf was taken from Melchor de Covarrubias family coats of arms. Melchor de Covarrubias helped found the university in 1587. In its early years the club used the university coats of arms which consists of a shield with a phoenix rising from the ashes. This was taken from the Melchor de Covarrubias family coats of arm. Throughout the years, the club used various badges, in the beginning using the university coat of arms.

== Players ==
=== First-team squad ===
As of 10 July 2019

== Honours ==
=== Domestic ===
- Ascenso MX
  - Champions (1): Clausura 2017
  - Runners-up (1): Clausura 2012
- Segunda División Profesional
  - Champions (1): Apertura 2003

=== Friendlies ===
- Copa Ciudad Hermanas
  - Winners (1): 1969

== Reserves ==
=== Lobos Prepa ===
The team participated in the Liga de Nuevos Talentos of the Segunda División, finishing as runners-up in the Apertura 2016, losing to Correcaminos UAT "B" 4–3 on penalties.
