= Natalia Serdán =

Pioneer of the Mexican Revolution

Natalia Serdán Alatriste (March 29, 1875, Puebla de Zaragoza, Mexico – Ciudad de Mexico 3 de abril 1936 was a pioneer of the Mexican Revolution together with her brothers Carmen, Aquiles and Máximo Serdán.

== Origin ==
She was the first daughter of the marriage of the rich merchant Manuel Serdán Guanes and Carmen Alatriste, the latter daughter of General Miguel Cástulo Alatriste, former governor of the State of Puebla on two occasions, 1857 and 1861. Natalia was the older sister of Carmen, Aquiles and Máximo Serdán Alatriste. She had to abandon her piano studies when her father died. On July 29, 1897, she married Manuel Sevilla Rosales.

== Participation in the events of Santa Clara ==
Natalia was not only the support of her brothers in the time they dedicated to preparing the revolutionary movement but they used their house on Calle de Portería de Santa Clara for the revolution.
