= Emilio Vargas =

Dominican baseball player (born 1996)

Pericos de Puebla – No. 49
- Pitcher
- Born: August 12, 1996 (age 30); Moca, Dominican Republic
- Bats: Right Throws: Right

CPBL debut
- August 3, 2023, for the CTBC Brothers

CPBL statistics (through 2023 season)
- Win–loss record: 3–2
- Earned run average: 2.55
- Strikeouts: 49
- Stats at Baseball Reference

Teams
- CTBC Brothers (2023)

Emilio Vargas (born August 12, 1996) is a Dominican professional baseball pitcher for the Pericos de Puebla of the Mexican League. He was signed by the Arizona Diamondbacks as an international free agent in 2013. He has previously played in the Chinese Professional Baseball League (CPBL) for the CTBC Brothers.

== Career ==
=== Arizona Diamondbacks ===
Vargas signed with the Arizona Diamondbacks as an international free agent on January 23, 2013. He spent his first two seasons with the DSL Diamondbacks, going 1–2 with a 6.35 ERA in 22 2/3 innings in 2013 and 4–4 with a 2.21 ERA in 61 innings in 2014. He split the 2015 season between the rookie–level Arizona League Diamondbacks, rookie–level Missoula Osprey, and High–A Visalia Rawhide, going a combined 6–1 with a 2.70 ERA over 59 1/3 innings. His 2016 was split between the Single–A Kane County Cougars and Visalia, combining to go 5–6 with a 4.10 ERA over 85.2 innings. he spent the 2017 season with Kane County, 5–7 with a 4.02 ERA in 100 2/3 innings. His 2018 season was split between Visalia and the Double–A Jackson Generals, combining to go 9–8 with a 2.88 ERA in 143 2/3 innings.

On November 20, 2018, the Diamondbacks added Vargas to their 40-man roster to protect him from the Rule 5 draft. He spent the 2019 season back with Jackson, going 5–3 with a 3.78 ERA over 17 starts and striking out 70 over 85 2/3 innings. Vargas did not play in a game in 2020 due to the cancellation of the minor league season because of the COVID-19 pandemic.

=== Chicago White Sox ===
On November 20, 2020, Vargas was claimed off waivers by the Chicago White Sox. On February 1, 2021, Vargas was designated for assignment by the White Sox after the team re–signed Carlos Rodón. He cleared waivers and was sent outright to the Triple–A Charlotte Knights on February 8. He spent the season with the Double–A Birmingham Barons, making 21 appearances (15 starts) and registering a 7–4 record and 2.90 ERA with 99 strikeouts in 83 2/3 innings pitched. He elected free agency following the season on November 7.

On November 28, 2021, Vargas re–signed with the White Sox on a minor league contract. He spent the 2022 season split between Double–A Birmingham and Triple–A Charlotte, making 26 combined appearances (19 starts) and posting a 4–9 record and 5.61 ERA with 116 strikeouts in 112 1/3 innings of work. Vargas became a free agent following the season on November 10, 2022.

=== Tecolotes de los Dos Laredos ===
On April 20, 2023, Vargas signed with the Tecolotes de los Dos Laredos of the Mexican League. In 13 starts for the Tecolotes, Vargas logged a 5–4 record and 4.50 ERA with 66 strikeouts in 70 innings pitched.

=== CTBC Brothers ===
On July 6, 2023, Vargas signed with the CTBC Brothers of the Chinese Professional Baseball League (CPBL). In 10 starts for CTBC, he posted a 3–2 record and 2.55 ERA with 49 strikeouts in 67.0 innings of work. On October 4, Vargas' contract was terminated by the Brothers and he was issued a permanent ban by the CPBL. The ban was a result of a positive drug test, in which Tetrahydrocannabinol, a class 2 narcotic in Taiwan, and banned substance in the CPBL, was detected.

=== Tecolotes de los Dos Laredos (second stint) ===
On April 2, 2024, Vargas signed with the Tecolotes de los Dos Laredos of the Mexican League. In 19 starts for Dos Laredos, he compiled a 6-5 record and 3.20 ERA with 99 strikeouts across 112 1/3 innings pitched.

=== Dorados de Chihuahua ===
On December 9, 2025, Vargas was traded to the Dorados de Chihuahua of the Mexican League. In 14 starts for Chihuahua in 2026, Vargas posted a 2–6 record with a 5.94 ERA and 60 strikeouts across 66 2/3 innings pitched.

=== Pericos de Puebla ===
On July 16, 2026, Vargas was traded to the Pericos de Puebla of the Mexican League in exchange for P Landen Bourassa.
