= Jorge Fitch =

Mexican baseball player and manager (1934–2021)

- Shortstop / Manager
- Born: 30 March 1934; Navolato, Sinaloa, Mexico
- Died: 15 April 2021 (aged 87); Rosarito, Baja California, Mexico
- Batted: Right Threw: Right

Career statistics
- Stats at Baseball Reference

Teams
- Tigres del México (1957–1959); Pericos de Puebla (1960–1967); Broncos de Reynosa (1969–1970); Alijadores de Tampico (1971); Bravos de Reynosa (1974–1975)

Career highlights and awards
- 2× Mexican League champion (1977, 1979); Pericos de Puebla #1 retired

Member of the Mexican Professional

Baseball Hall of Fame
- Induction: 2001

Jorge Fitch Díaz (30 March 1934 – 15 April 2021) was a Mexican professional baseball player and manager. As a shortstop, he played for the Tigres del México, Pericos de Puebla, Broncos/Bravos de Reynosa, and Alijadores de Tampico of the Mexican League. Fitch accumulated 1,676 hits in 1,670 games for a .272 lifetime batting average. During the winter, he played 10 seasons with the Naranjeros de Hermosillo, Mayos de Navojoa and Yaquis de Obregón of the Mexican Pacific League.

== Early life ==
Fitch was born on 30 March 1934 in Navolato, Sinaloa, but was raised in Tijuana, Baja California. As a teenager, he showed considerable aptitude for baseball, basketball, and football, standing out as goalkeeper. He ultimately decided to focus on baseball. His admiration for New York Yankees shortstop Phil Rizzuto influenced his decision to play in that same position.

== Playing career ==
=== Mexican Central League ===
Fitch made his professional debut in 1956 with the Mineros de Fresnillo of the Mexican Central League.

=== Mexican League ===
In 1957, Fitch was signed by the Tigres de México, making his debut in the Mexican League. In 1960, he was transferred to the Pericos de Puebla, with whom he won the Mexican League championship in 1963. That season was also the best of his career statistically, as he batted .316 with 167 hits, 25 doubles, and a .412 slugging percentage.

In 1969, he joined the Broncos de Reynosa, and in 1971, he was transferred to the Alijadores de Tampico. He returned to Reynosa for the 1974 and 1975 seasons.

=== Mexican Pacific League ===
Fitch played nine season in the Mexican Pacific League (LMP), Mexico's winter league. He debuted during the 1960–61 season with the Naranjeros de Hermosillo. In 1965, he was transferred to the Yaquis de Obregón where he help winning the LMP championship and was awarded as the Most Valuable Player that season. He played the 1970–71 season with the Mayos de Navojoa and retired following the season.

== Managerial career ==
He started his managerial career in 1972 with the Broncos de Reynosa and would later manage the Tecolotes de Nuevo Laredo, Pericos de Puebla and Alacranes de Durango. He posted an 829–421 managing record in eight seasons, appearing in five playoff series, while winning two championships with Tecolotes de Nuevo Laredo in 1977 and with Angeles Negros de Puebla in 1979.

== Managerial achievements ==
League	Club	Country	Year
Mexican League	Tecolotes de Nuevo Laredo	Mexico	1976–1977
Mexican League	Angeles Negros	Mexico	1978–1979

== Legacy and death ==
Fitch was enshrined into the Mexican Professional Baseball Hall of Fame as part of the class of 2001 alongside pitcher Charrascas Ramírez, catcher Rodolfo Sandoval, and infielder Jack Pierce.

Fitch died on 15 April 2021, aged 87, in Rosarito, Baja California. On 30 June 2021, the Pericos de Puebla retired Fitch's number 1.
