= Iván Salas =

Mexican baseball player (born 1990)

Pericos de Puebla – No. 76
- Pitcher
- Born: December 30, 1990 (age 35); Navojoa, Sonora, Mexico
- Bats: Left Throws: Left
- Stats at Baseball Reference

Iván Salas (born December 30, 1990) is a Mexican professional baseball pitcher for the Pericos de Puebla of the Mexican League.

== Professional career ==
=== Piratas de Campeche ===
Salas began his career with the Piratas de Campeche of the Mexican League in 2009. On December 31, 2009, Salas elected free agency. On March 11, 2011, Salas re-signed with the Piratas. Salas played with Campeche through the 2018 season, pitching to a cumulative 3.57 ERA with 170 strikeouts in 242.0 innings pitched across 9 seasons with the team.

=== Sultanes de Monterrey ===
On May 20, 2021, Salas signed with the Sultanes de Monterrey of the Mexican League. Appearing in 29 games, he posted a 4.08 ERA with 20 strikeouts in 28 2/3 innings pitched.

=== Pericos de Puebla ===
On April 21, 2022, Salas signed with the Pericos de Puebla. He made 10 appearances for the club, pitching to a 4.63 ERA with 10 strikeouts in 11 2/3 innings pitched.

=== Sultanes de Monterrey (second stint) ===
On May 17, 2022, Salas was traded back to the Sultanes de Monterrey. In 14 games down the stretch, Salas worked to a 1-0 record and 2.77 ERA with 10 strikeouts in 13.0 innings pitched.

=== Guerreros de Oaxaca ===
On January 30, 2023, Salas signed with the Guerreros de Oaxaca of the Mexican League. In 26 games for Oaxaca, Salas posted a 5.60 ERA with 15 strikeouts across 17 2/3 innings of work.

=== Olmecas de Tabasco ===
On November 21, 2023, Salas was selected by the Conspiradores de Querétaro in the team's expansion draft. He did not appear for the club during the 2024 season.

On April 16, 2025, Salas was traded to the Olmecas de Tabasco of the Mexican League. In 27 appearances for Tabasco, he posted a 1-0 record and 4.91 ERA with 13 strikeouts across 18 1/3 innings pitched. Salas was released by the Olmecas on July 15.

=== Pericos de Puebla (second stint) ===
On April 16, 2026, Salas signed with the Pericos de Puebla of the Mexican League.

== International career ==
Salas was chosen for the Mexico national baseball team at the 2017 World Baseball Classic.
