= Mexican Center League =

Minor league baseball circuit

- Classification: Class C
- Sport: Baseball
- Founded: 1956
- Folded: 1957
- President: Anuar Canavati
- Country: Mexico

The Mexican Center League was a Class C Minor League Baseball circuit that operated in 1956 and 1957.

== History ==
By 1955, the outlaw Mexican League was struggling for survival during its confrontation against Major League Baseball. As a result, Anuar Canavati, president of the Sultanes de Monterrey team, led a group of new owners that helped make the league part of Organized Baseball as a Class AA circuit in 1955. On the other hand, he encouraged the creation of the Mexican Center League, which operated as a Class C circuit between 1956 and 1957, as a support for the Mexican League. Canavati also served as president of the six-team league during its brief period of existence.

== Cities represented/Teams ==
- Aguascalientes, Aguascalientes

Rieleros de Aguascalientes (1956)
Tigres de Aguascalientes (1957)

- Chihuahua, Chihuahua

Dorados de Chihuahua (1956–1957)

- Ciudad Juárez, Chihuahua

Indios de Ciudad Juárez (1956–1957)

- Durango, Durango

Alacranes de Durango (1956–1957)

- Fresnillo, Zacatecas

Mineros de Fresnillo (1956)
Rojos de Fresnillo (1957)

- Saltillo, Coahuila

Saraperos de Saltillo (1956–1957)

== Standings ==
=== 1956 ===
Team	W	L	PCT	GB	Manager(s)
Saraperos de Saltillo	58	41	.589	–	(Cuba) Agustín Bejerano
Dorados de Chihuahua	58	42	.580	½	(Mexico) Manuel Arroyo
Indios de Ciudad Juárez	48	52	.480	10½	(Cuba) Manuel Fortes (United States) Syd Cohen
Mineros de Fresnillo	47	53	.470	11½	(Mexico) Eduardo Reyes (Mexico) José Gutiérrez (Mexico) Jesús Díaz
Alacranes de Durango	45	54	.455	13	(Mexico) Salvador Sahuayo (Cuba) Tribilín Cabrera
Rieleros de Aguascalientes	43	57	.430	15½	(Cuba) Martín Dihigo (Mexico) Armando Flores

=== 1957 ===
Teams	W	L	PCT	GB	Managers
Dorados de Chihuahua	62	38	.620	–	(Mexico) Manuel Arroyo
Saraperos de Saltillo	55	45	.550	7	(Mexico) Domingo Santana (Dominican Republic) José St. Claire (Mexico) Gustavo Bello
Alacranes de Durango	52	48	.520	10	(Cuba) Virgilio Arteaga
Indios de Ciudad Juárez	49	51	.490	13	(United States) Syd Cohen (Mexico) Jesús Díaz
Rojos de Fresnillo	43	55	.439	18	(Cuba) Preston Gómez (Cuba) Agustín Bejerano (Mexico) José Luis Garcia (United States) Wild Bill Wright
Tigres de Aguascalientes	37	61	.378	24	(Mexico) Armando Flores (Mexico) Chile Gómez
