= Tommy Herrera =

American baseball player (1931–2016)

- Pitcher / Manager
- Born: November 9, 1931; Laredo, Texas, U.S.
- Died: December 14, 2016 (aged 85); Saltillo, Coahuila, Mexico
- Batted: Right Threw: Right

Member of the Mexican Professional

Baseball Hall of Fame
- Induction: 2023

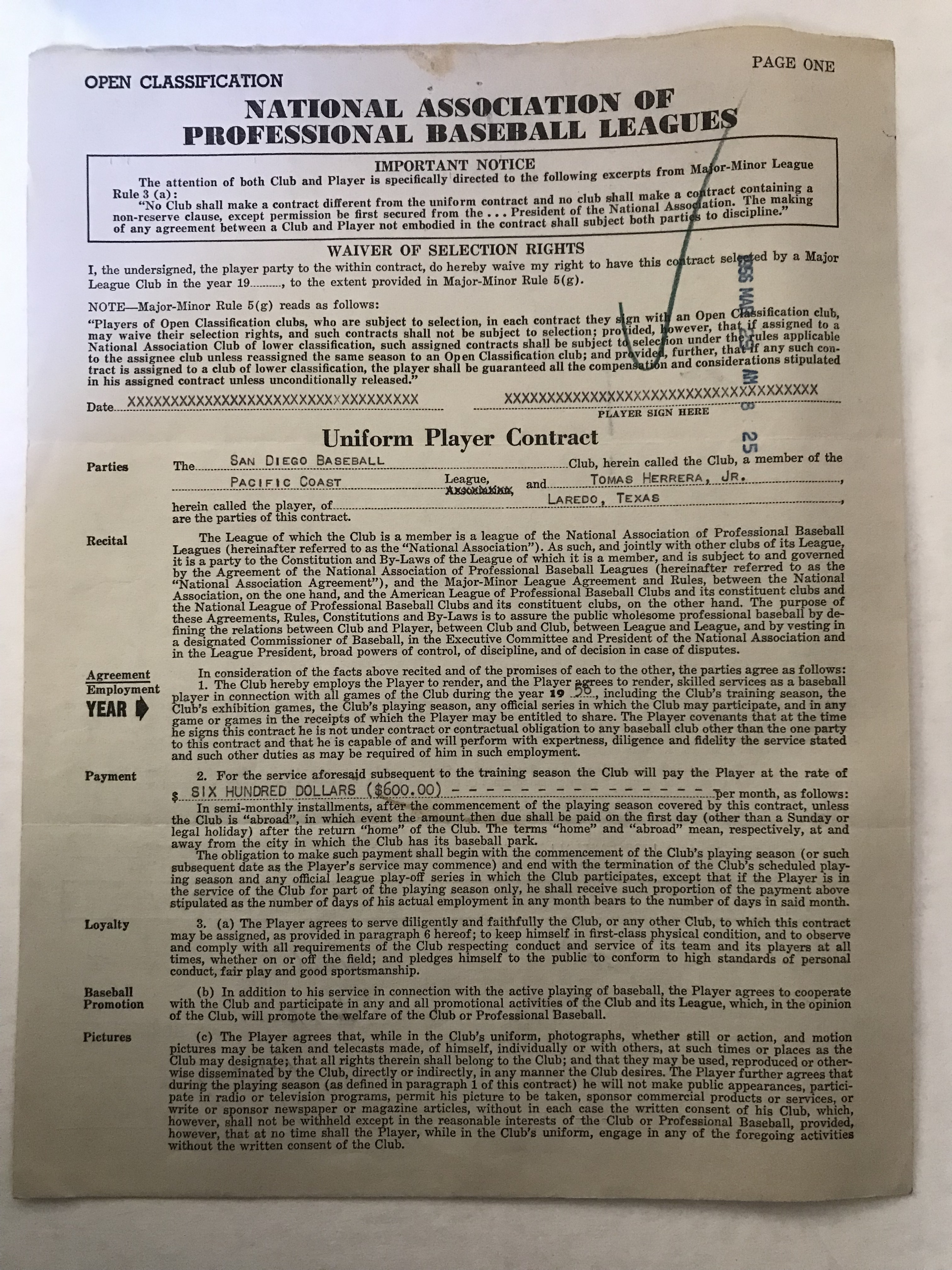
Herrera's Minor League Contract

Tomás Herrera Jr. (November 9, 1931 – December 14, 2016) was a Mexican-American professional baseball player and manager, beginning his professional career in 1953. Herrera spent six seasons playing in the Mexican League and was enshrined in the Mexican Professional Baseball Hall of Fame in 2023. His nickname was "Sargento Metralla".

== Playing career ==
Herrera was born on November 9, 1931, in Laredo, Texas.

Herrera played in the minor leagues for at least six seasons, never reaching the major leagues - though he did spend parts of four seasons at the Open designation, which was created to help build the Pacific Coast League into a major league and in the Mexican League, the highest-level professional league in Mexico. A pitcher, Herrera won as many as 10 games in a season, per the records available.

Herrera spent six seasons in the Mexican League, from 1957 to 1962, playing for the Tecolotes de Nuevo Laredo, the Tigres de México, and the Diablos Rojos del México, recording 167 games, 49 wins, 44 losses, and an ERA of 4.14.

== Managerial career ==
After retiring, in 1963, Herrera was given the chance to manage the Diablos Rojos del México, leading them to first place finishes and league championships in 1964 and 1968; he left the team after the 1969 season.

He managed the Saraperos de Saltillo from 1970 to 1972, reaching the Final Series twice, but losing against the Charros de Jalisco in 1971 and against the Cafeteros de Córdoba in 1972. In 1973 he managed the Pericos de Puebla and the Mineros de Coahuila in 1974 and 1975. He was the first manager in the history of the Saraperos and Mineros.

== Death ==
Herrera died on December 14, 2016 in Saltillo, Coahuila, Mexico, aged 85. In 2023, he was elected to the Mexican Professional Baseball Hall of Fame.

== Managerial statistics ==
=== Mexican League ===
Year	Team	Regular season						Postseason			
Year	Team	Games	Won	Lost	Tied	Pct.	Finish	Won	Lost	Pct.	Notes
1963	MEX	132	71	61	0	.538	2nd	–	–	–	–
1964	MEX	140	82	58	0	.586	1st	–	–	–	–
1965	MEX	140	66	74	0	.471	5th	–	–	–	–
1966	MEX	140	74	66	0	.529	3rd	2	4	.333	Lost Final Series (Tigres)
1967	MEX	140	75	63	2	.543	3rd	–	–	–	–
1968	MEX	140	82	58	0	.586	1st	–	–	–	–
1969	MEX	154	74	80	0	.481	5th	–	–	–	–
1970	SLT	150	67	83	0	.447	5th in North	–	–	–	–
1971	SLT	146	86	59	1	.592	1st in North	3	4	.429	Lost Final Series (Jalisco)
1972	SLT	140	89	51	0	.636	1st in North	2	4	.333	Lost Final Series (Córdoba)
1973	PUE	133	71	62	0	.534	4th in South	–	–	–	–
1974	COA	138	59	77	2	.435	7th in North	–	–	–	–
1975	COA	134	57	77	0	.425	7th in North	–	–	–	–
Total		1827	953	869	5	.523		7	12	.368	
