= Agustín Bejerano =

Cuban baseball player and manager

- Left fielder
- Born: May 16, 1909; Manzanillo, Cuba
- Died: November 6, 1972 (aged 63); Ciudad Madero, Mexico
- Batted: Left Threw: Left

Negro leagues debut
- 1928, for the Lincoln Giants

Last Negro leagues appearance
- 1929, for the Cuban Stars (East)

Negro leagues statistics
- Batting average: .292
- Home runs: 1
- Runs batted in: 25
- Stats at Baseball Reference

Teams
- Lincoln Giants (1928); Cuban Stars (East) (1928–1929)

Member of the Mexican Professional

Baseball Hall of Fame
- Induction: 1973

Agustín "Pijini" Bejerano (May 16, 1909 – November 6, 1972) was a Cuban professional baseball left fielder and manager in the Negro leagues and Mexican League. He played with the Lincoln Giants and Cuban Stars (East) from 1928 to 1929, before spending time with several Mexican League clubs from 1937 to 1955. He also served as a manager for multiple teams from 1949 to 1964. He was named to the Mexican Professional Baseball Hall of Fame in 1973.
