= 1971 Mexican Baseball League season =

1971 Mexican League season
- League: Mexican League
- Sport: Baseball
- Duration: March 16 – August 18
- Games: 883
- Teams: 12

Serie del Rey
- Champions: Charros de Jalisco
- Runners-up: Saraperos de Saltillo

LMB seasons
- ← 1970 1972 →

The 1971 Mexican League season was the 47th season in the history of the Mexican League. The league expanded from 10 to 12 teams, with the expansion teams being the Piratas de Sabinas and the Alijadores de Tampico. The season started on March 16 and ended on August 18 with the last game of the Serie del Rey, where the Charros de Jalisco defeated the Saraperos de Saltillo to win the championship. The Horsemen became the first team in the Serie del Rey to overcome a 3–0 deficit and the only one until the Toros de Tijuana in 2021.

== Standings ==
North
Rank	Team	W	L	Pct.	GB
1	Saraperos de Saltillo	86	59	.593	−
2	Sultanes de Monterrey	83	63	.568	3.5
3	Alijadores de Tampico	79	65	.549	6.5
4	Algondoneros de Unión Laguna	72	76	.486	15.5
5	Piratas de Sabinas	62	83	.428	24
6	Broncos de Reynosa	47	100	.320	40

South
Rank	Team	W	L	Pct.	GB
1	Charros de Jalisco	82	65	.558	−
2	Diablos Rojos del México	81	65	.555	0.5
3	Tigres Capitalinos	80	67	.544	2
4	Leones de Yucatan	71	75	.486	10.5
5	Rojos del Aguila de Veracruz	70	75	.483	11
6	Petroleros de Poza Rica	61	81	.430	18.5

== Postseason ==
The Serie del Rey was played in a best-of-seven series between the North and South Region champions. The Saraperos began by winning the first three games to lead the series. Game four was postponed due to rain and was scheduled for the next day. The Charros won, staying alive by taking the series to game five, played on the same day. The Charros won game five and returned to Guadalajara. There, they won game six and later the decisive game seven, thus reverse sweeping the Saraperos. It was the only time a team had recovered from a 3–0 deficit in the final series until the 2021 season, where the Toros de Tijuana recovered from a 3–0 series deficit and beat the Leones de Yucatán.

== Awards ==
Award	Player	Team	Ref.
Rookie of the Year	(Mexico) Miguel Suárez	México	
