= Bernardo Calvo =

Mexican baseball player and manager (born 1945)

- Infielder / Outfielder
- Born: November 16, 1945 (age 80); Tlacotalpan, Veracruz, Mexico
- Bats: Right Throws: Right
Medals
Men's baseball
Representing Mexico
Amateur World Series
Silver medal – second place	1965 Cartagena	Team

Bernardo R. (Perez) Calvo (born November 16, 1945, in Tlacotalpan, Veracruz) played in and managed in the Mexican League, the highest level of professional baseball in Mexico.

Calvo was on the Mexico national team that took second place at the 1965 Amateur World Series in Colombia. He played professionally from 1965 to at least 1979 and he managed from 1991 to 1997 and in 2005.

He died January 2, 2025.
