= Clemente Carreras =

Cuban baseball player (born 1914)

- Infielder / Left fielder / Manager
- Born: March 25, 1914; Havana, Cuba
- Died: November 19, 1989 (aged 75)
- Batted: Right Threw: Right

Negro league baseball debut
- 1937, for the Cuban Stars (East)

Last appearance
- 1941, for the New York Cubans

NNL statistics
- Batting average: .276
- Home runs: 6
- Runs batted in: 32
- Stats at Baseball Reference

Teams
- Cuban Stars (East) (1937); New York Cubans (1938); Cuban Stars (East) (1939); New York Cubans (1940–41)
Medals
Manager for Cuba
Amateur World Series
| Gold medal – first place | 1952 Havana | Team |
| Gold medal – first place | 1961 San José | Team |

Clemente Carreras González (March 25, 1914 – November 19, 1989) was a Cuban professional baseball third baseman, second baseman, and left fielder. Nicknamed "Sungo", he played in the Negro leagues from 1937 to 1941, including two major league seasons for the New York Cubans from 1940 to 1941. He also played for the Cubans in 1938 and with the Eastern Cuban Stars in 1937 and 1939.

Carreras played with Alijadores de Tampico of the Mexican League (LMB), the highest level of professional baseball in Mexico, in 1943. He later skippered the LMBB's Sultanes de Monterrey from 1962 to 1964, the Ángeles de Puebla in 1976 and the Alijadores de Tampico in 1977.

Carreras managed the Cuba national baseball team to two Amateur World Series titles, in 1952 and 1961. The latter tournament one of the first international competitions that the country participated in after the Cuban Revolution. Cuba won the championship, but Carreras defected after the conclusion of the tournament, choosing to remain in Costa Rica. Tito Fuentes and Bert Campaneris also defected following the tournament.

Following his defection, Carreras managed in the Mexican League, leading Sultanes de Monterrey to a championship in 1962. He later had brief stints managing for the Ángeles de Puebla and the Alijadores de Tampico. He also coached in Nicaragua, Spain, and Puerto Rico.

He was elected to the Cuban Exile Baseball Hall of Fame in 1998. (Note: Cuban Baseball Hall of Fame inductions between 1962 and 2007 are not formally recognized by the Baseball Federation of Cuba)
