= Raúl Cano =

Mexican baseball player and manager

- Pitcher / Manager
- Born: 23 December 1945 (age 80); Guaymas, Sonora, Mexico
- Bats: Right Throws: Right

Raúl Armando Cano (born 23 December 1945) is a Mexican former professional baseball manager and pitcher. Born in Guaymas, Sonora, he batted and threw right handed.

Though he never played in or managed in the Major Leagues, Cano spent a long career in the Mexican League, the highest level of professional baseball in Mexico.

Cano played in the Mexican League from 1967 to 1971, mostly with the Diablos Rojos del México. He later managed the Venados de Mazatlán to the 1997–1998 Mexican Pacific League championship. As the league champions, the team represented Mexico in the 1998 Caribbean Series.

Besides, he has managed in the Mexican League for the Ángeles de Puebla (1973; 1977–1978), Plataneros de Tabasco (1979; 1982), Rojos del Águila de Veracruz (1995; 1999), Petroleros de Poza Rica (1996), Mayas de Chetumal (1998), Algodoneros de Torreón (2000), Broncos de Reynosa (2001–2002), Saraperos de Saltillo (2003), Potros de Tijuana (2005) and Olmecas de Tabasco (2011–2012).

== Sources ==
- Treto Cisneros, Pedro (2002). The Mexican League/La Liga Mexicana: Comprehensive Player Statistics, 1937-2001. McFarland & Company. ISBN 978-0-78-641378-2
