= Carmen Serdán =

Mexican revolutionary (1875–1948)

- Born: 11 November 1875; Puebla de Zaragoza, Puebla, Mexico
- Died: 21 August 1948 (aged 72); Tacubaya, Mexico City
- Resting place: Museo Regional de la Revolución Mexicana
- Other name: Marcos Serrato (pseudonym)
- Occupations: Revolutionary; nurse; journalist
- Political party: National Anti-Reelectionist Party
- Relatives: Miguel Cástulo Alatriste (grandfather); Aquiles Serdán (brother); Máximo Serdán (brother); Natalia Serdán (sister)
- Military career
- Allegiance: Mexico (anti-reelectionism)
- Battles/wars: Mexican Revolution; Raid on the Serdán family house (WIA)

María del Carmen Serdán Alatriste (11 November 1873 – 21 August 1948), commonly known as Carmen Serdán, was a Mexican revolutionary, nurse, and journalist. She played a prominent early role in the Mexican Revolution, particularly in the anti-reelectionist movement supporting Francisco I. Madero against the dictatorship of Porfirio Díaz.

She collaborated closely with her siblings Aquiles, Máximo, and Natalia in organizing resistance in Puebla, participating in propaganda efforts, weapons smuggling, and direct combat, when her family home became the site of the first armed clash of the Revolution, two days before the planned national uprising.

== Early life ==
María del Carmen Serdán Alatriste was born on 11 November 1873 in Puebla de Zaragoza, Puebla, the eldest child of Manuel Serdán Guanes and María del Carmen Alatriste Cuesta. Her family had deep liberal roots. Her maternal grandfather, Miguel Cástulo Alatriste Castro, served as the liberal governor of Puebla during the reform era and the French intervertion in Mexico. Her father was involved in drafting the progressive Ley del Pueblo, an early agrarian reform manifesto.

Little is documented about her childhood beyond attendance at a private girls' school run by Teresian Sisters, where she purportedly gave music lessons. The Serdán household was politically engaged, hosting meetings and discussions influenced by liberal and reformist ideas.

== Revolutionary activities ==
=== Anti-reelectionist organizing ===
In 1909, Carmen and her siblings founded the anti-reelectionist club Luz y Progreso in Puebla to support Francisco I. Madero's opposition to Porfirio Díaz's reelection. Although officially male-led, the Serdán women were central to its operations, handling logistics, propaganda distribution, and fundraising. Carmen helped acquired and transport weapons manufactured homemade bombs, distributed copies of Madero’s Plan de San Luis Potosí, and spread revolutionary propaganda.

While her brother Aquiles was in exile in San Antonio, Texas, she maintained coded communications with him and sometimes used the male pseudonym "Marcos Serrato" for newspapers publications and correspondence.

=== Raid on the Serdán family house ===
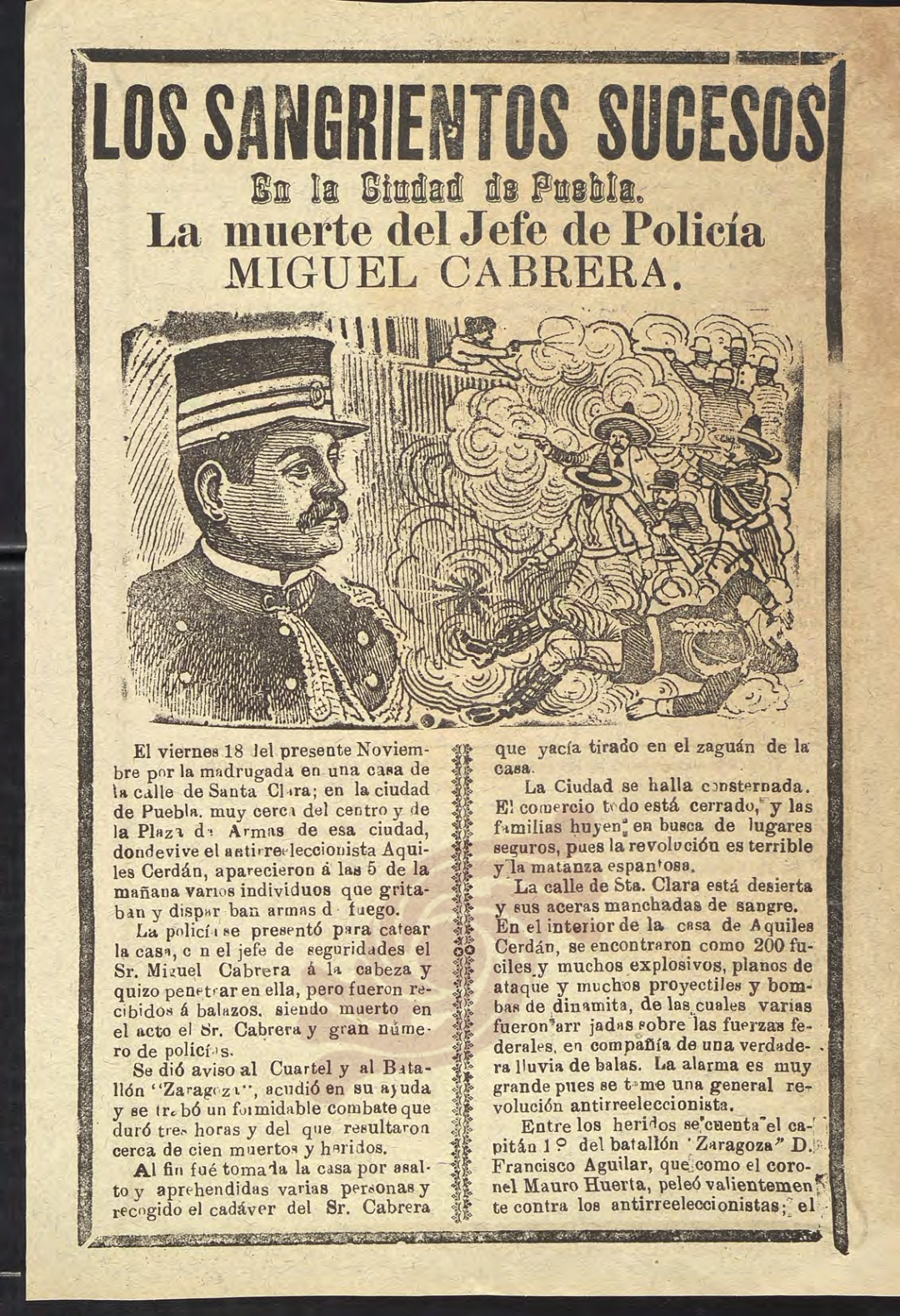
1910 broadside reporting Police Chief Cabrera's death. Carmen is depicted firing a handgun from the balcony.

On 18 November 1910, two days before the planned national uprising outlined in Madero's Plan of San Luis Potosí, federal police under the command of Miguel Cabrera attacked the Serdán family home, after learning it was an arms cache. Carmen, her siblings, her mother, her sister-in-law and a small group of supporters took up arms in defense.

Armed with a rifle, Carmen fired from the balcony, killing Cabrera as she reportedly shouted encouragements to the people of Puebla to join the fight. During the battle her brother Máximo was killed. Aquiles, wounded, hid in a basement under a secret trapdoor but was discovered and executed the following day. Carmen herself was wounded in the fighting and, together with her mother and sister-in-law, was arrested and imprisoned in La Merced jail before being transferred to San Pedro Hospital under guard. They faced criminal proceedings but were released on 7 May 1911, after the fall of the Díaz regime, amid public acclaim.

== Later revolutionary involvement and life ==
Following Victoriano Huerta's 1913 coup against Madero, Carmen joined the Junta Revolucionaria in Puebla and aligned with Venustiano Carranza's Constitutionalist Army. She worked as a nurse in military hospitals and helped organize nursing staff until the 1917 Constitution was promulgated, after which she retired from active military roles.

She lived primarily in Tacubaya, Mexico City, but returned annually to Puebla for commemorations of the 18 November uprising. She contributed as a journalist to outlets such as El Hijo del Ahuizote and Diario del Hogar. In her later years, she received recognition as a veteran of the revolution. She died on 21 August 1948 in Mexico City.

== Legacy ==
As a female figure of the Mexican Revolution, her role in the siege of her family home is featured in corridos, narrative folk songs that describe her armed resistance.

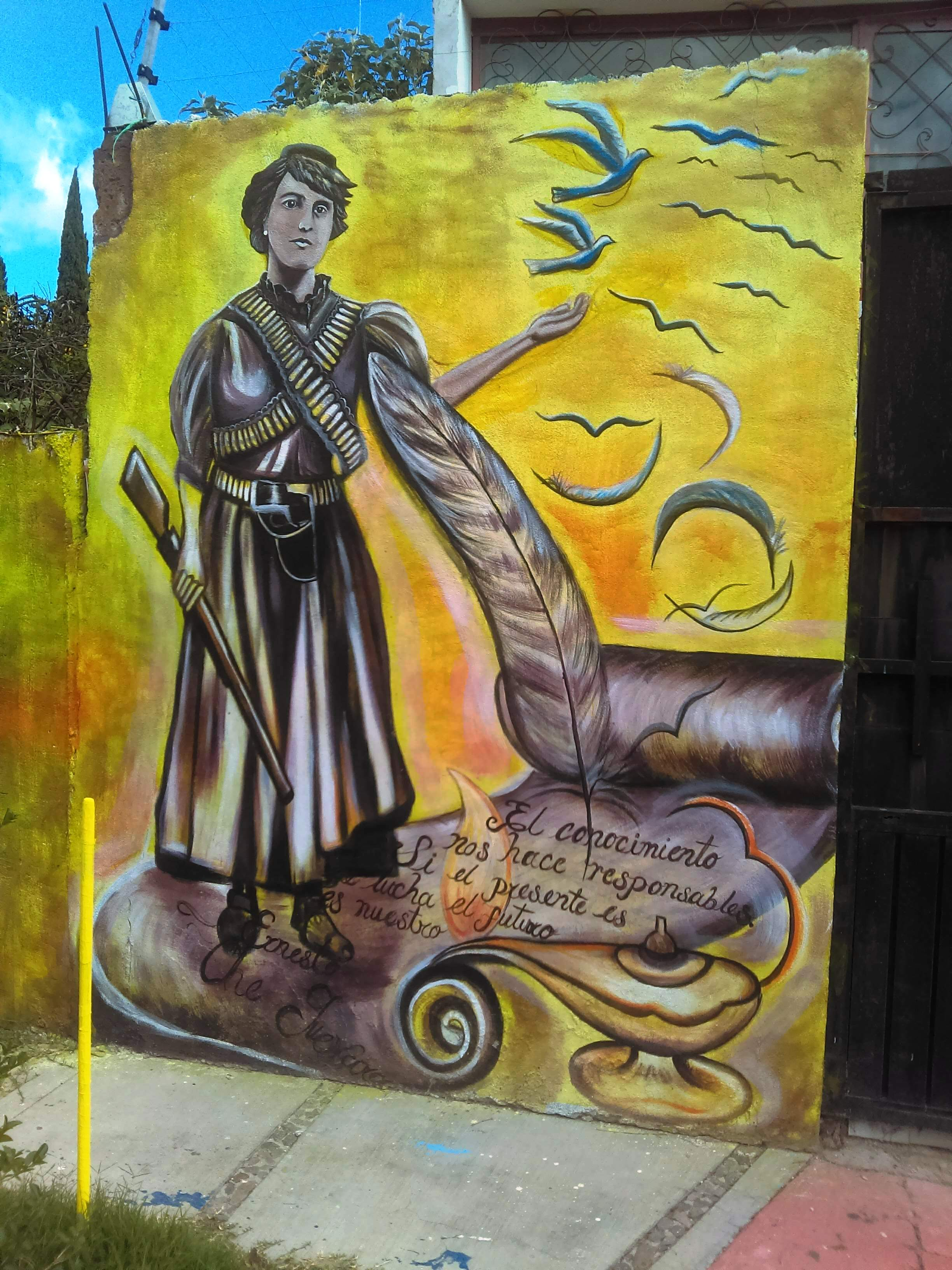
Mural in Actopan, Hidalgo.

Schools, streets, and cultural institutions across Mexico bear her name.

Soon after her death, the Chamber of Deputies held a solemn session on 26 November 1948 and, to honor her as "paradigm of Mexican women's heroism", inscribed her name in gold letters on the walls of the session room of the Legislative Palace of San Lázaro, the main seat of the legislative power of the Mexican government.

Her family home in Puebla's historic center was declared a national monument and inaugurated on 18 November 1960 by President Adolfo López Mateos as the Museo Regional de la Revolución Mexicana "Casa de los Hermanos Serdán". Her remains, originally buried in Puebla's municipal cemetery, were transferred in 1968 to the Serdán family mausoleum and then relocated inside the museum in 2017, where they rest today alongside those of her siblings.

In 2020, the Congress of the State of Puebla declared Carmen and her sister Natalia Beneméritas de Puebla (Distinguished Citizens)
