= Ray Torres =

Mexican baseball player (1958–2012)

- Outfielder
- Born: 12 April 1958; Hermosillo, Sonora, Mexico
- Died: 27 October 2012 (aged 54); Mérida, Yucatán Mexico
- Batted: Right Threw: Right
- Stats at Baseball Reference

Teams
- Alacranes de Durango (1977–1979); Diablos Rojos del México (1982–1984); Leones de Yucatán (1984–1990, 1994–1998); Piratas de Campeche (1991–1993); Industriales de Monterrey (1991)

Member of the Mexican Professional

Baseball Hall of Fame
- Induction: 2006

Raymundo Antonio Torres Ruiz (12 April 1958 – 27 October 2012) was a Mexican baseball outfielder who spent 22 seasons in professional baseball, including 20 in the Mexican League.

== Personal life ==
Torres was born in Hermosillo, Sonora, Mexico and died in Mérida, Yucatán at the age of 54 in a car accident.

== Playing career ==
He began his career in 1977, playing for the Alacranes de Durango. He remained with them through 1978. From 1979 to 1982, he played in the Chicago White Sox organization, before returning to the Mexican League partway through the 1982 season, where he remained until his retirement in 1998. He spent most of his Mexican League career with the Leones de Yucatán.

He was elected to the Mexican Professional Baseball Hall of Fame in 2006.
