= Tony Castaño =

Cuban baseball player (1911–1989)

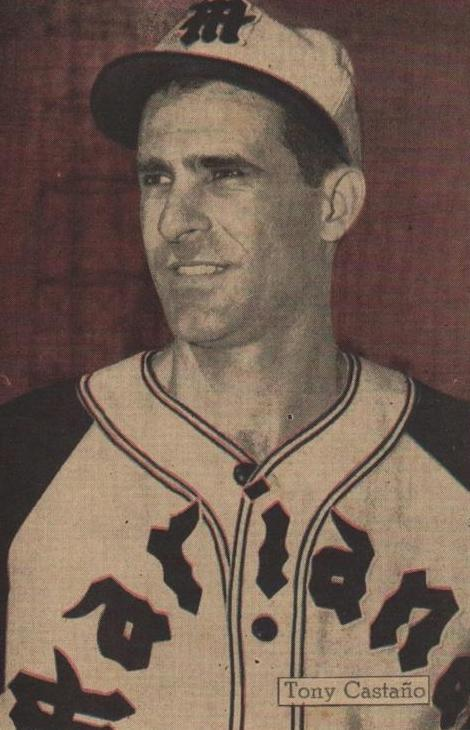
- Second baseman
- Born: February 11, 1911; Palma Soriano, Cuba
- Died: October 13, 1989 (aged 77); Tampa, Florida, US
- Batted: Right Threw: Right

Antonio Castaño (February 11, 1911 – October 13, 1989) had a long career in professional baseball. He spent time managing in the Mexican League, the highest level of professional baseball in Mexico.

He began his career playing in Cuba and from 1938 to 1945, and again in 1950, he played in the minor leagues. He hit .294 with 1,044 hits (of which only four were home runs) in 3,555 at-bats. Perhaps his best season was 1938 with the Asheville Tourists, when he hit .332 with 180 hits, 26 doubles and eight triples in 134 games.

During the winter, he played in Cuba.

He later managed in the minors, skippering the Tecolotes de Nuevo Laredo (1956), Havana Sugar Kings (1960), Fresnillo Rojos (1962), Pericos de Puebla (1963–1965, 1968–1969, 1974–1975), Petroleros de Poza Rica (1966), Leones de Yucatán (1970) and the Rojos del Águila de Veracruz (1971).
