= Rodolfo Sandoval =

Uruguayan footballer (born 1948)

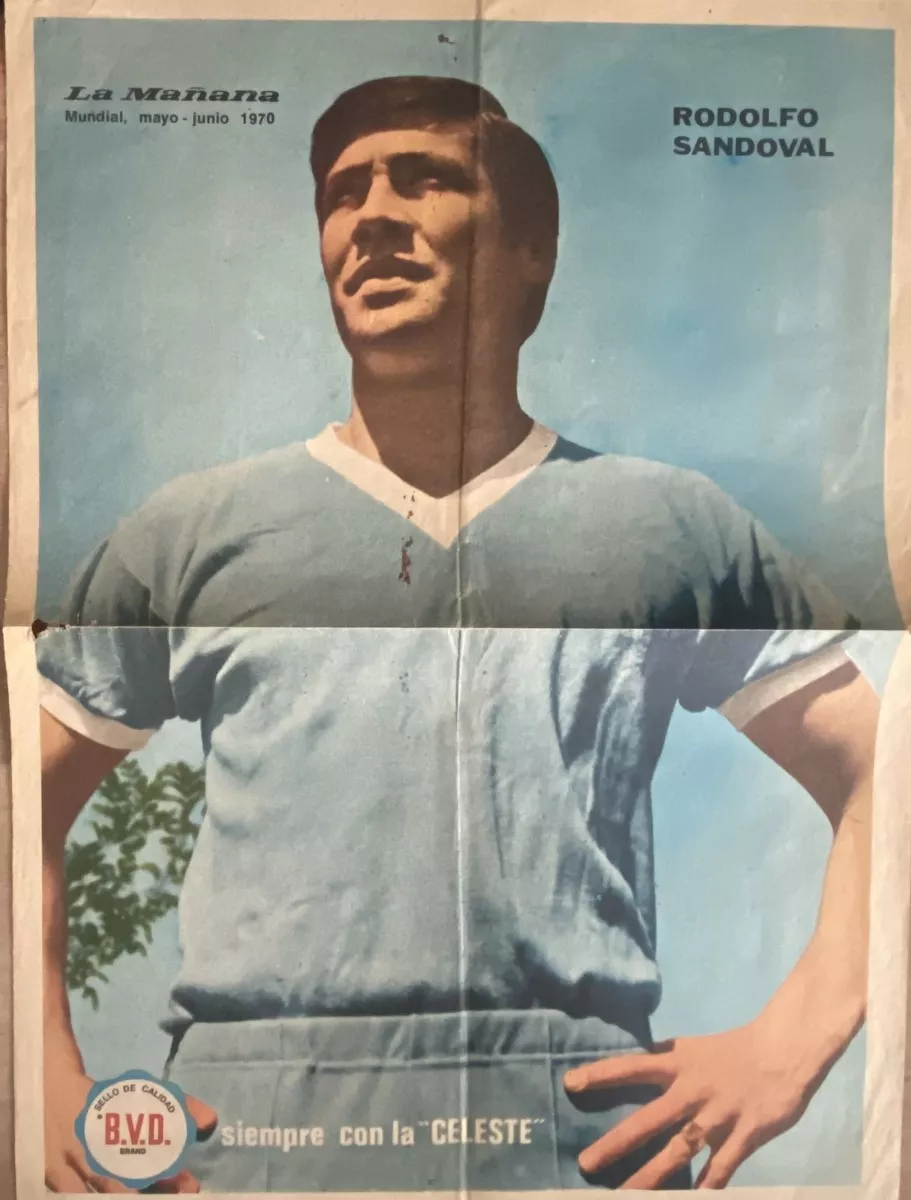
- Sandoval playing in the 1970 FIFA World Cup

Personal information
- Full name: Rodolfo Ariel Sandoval
- Date of birth: 4 October 1948 (age 78)
- Place of birth: Uruguay
- Height: 1.74 m (5 ft 9 in)
- Position: Midfielder

Senior career*
Years	Team	Apps	(Gls)
- C.A. Peñarol

International career
- Uruguay
- * Club domestic league appearances and goals

Rodolfo Ariel Sandoval (born 4 October 1948) is a Uruguayan football midfielder who played for Uruguay in the 1970 FIFA World Cup. He also played for C.A. Peñarol.
