= Estadio Olímpico Ignacio Zaragoza =

Olympic stadium in Puebla, Mexico

Coordinates: 19°03′17″N 98°11′11″W

- El Zaragoza "The Zaragoza"
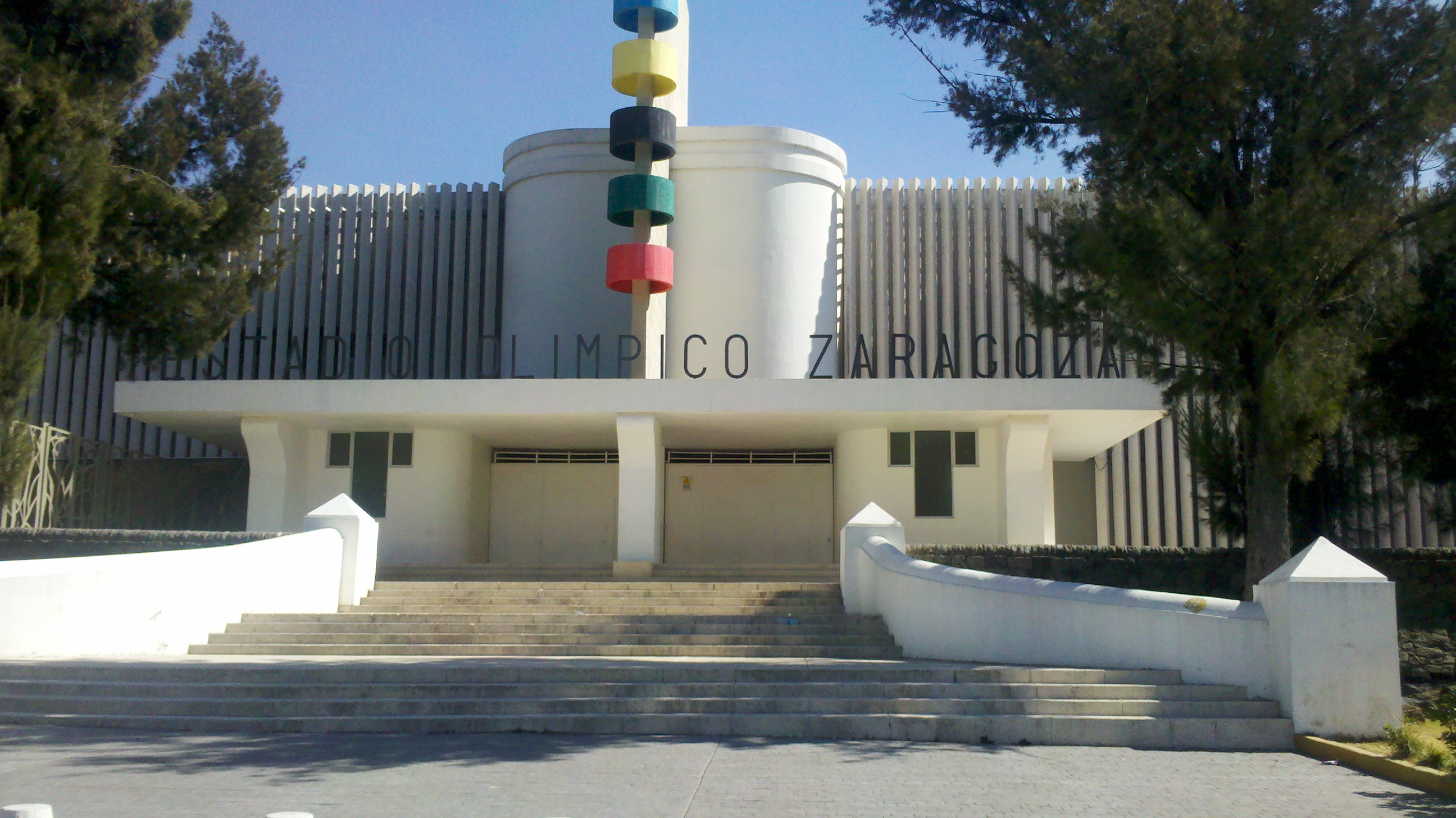
- Interactive map of Estadio Olímpico Ignacio Zaragoza
- Location: Puebla, Puebla, Mexico
- Capacity: 22,000
- Surface: Grass

Construction
- Opened: May 1952

Tenants
- Pericos de Puebla (1952-1972); Puebla F.C. (1957-1968)

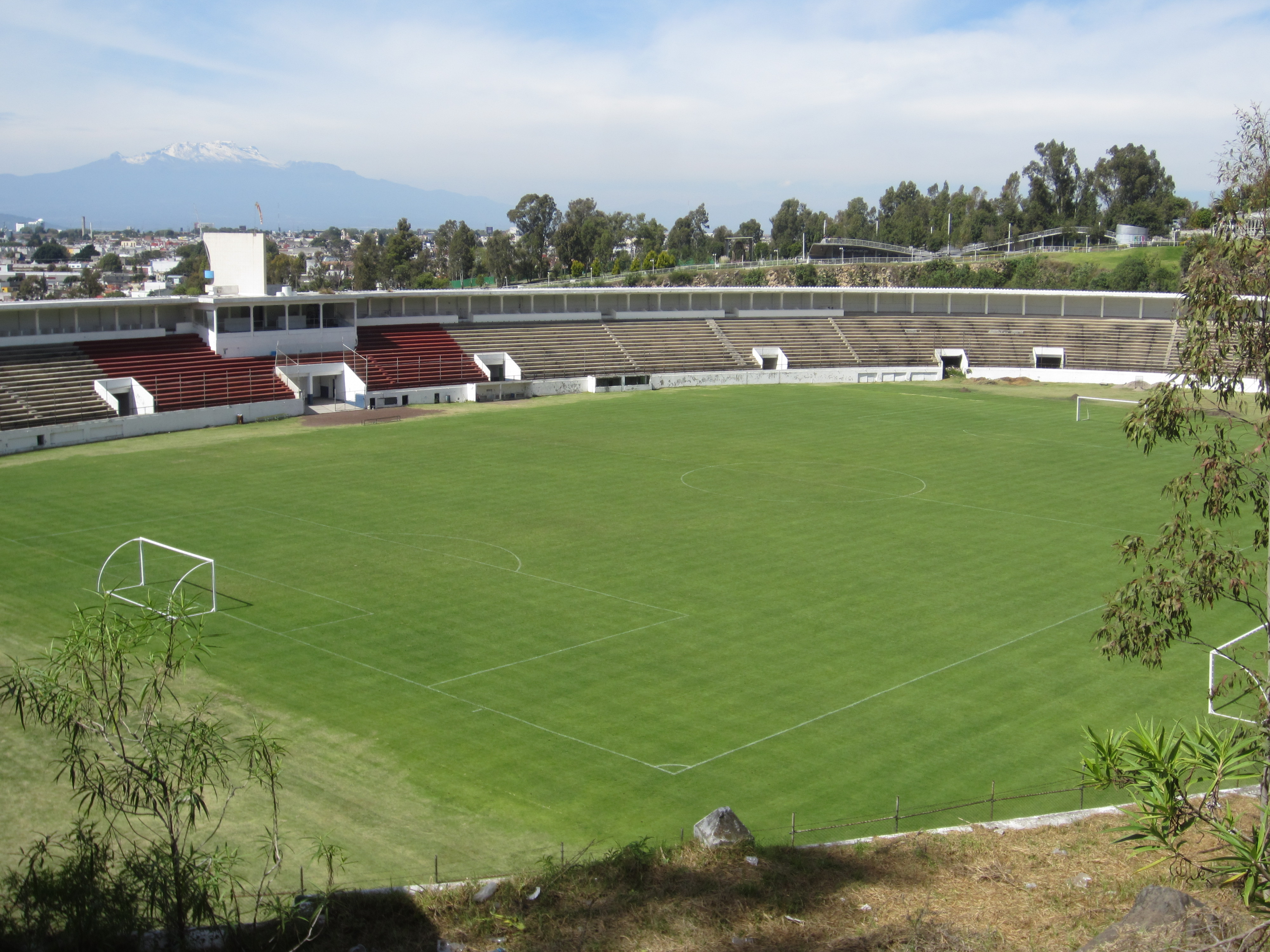
The stadium's interior, 2018

Estadio Olímpico Ignacio Zaragoza (In English: Ignacio Zaragoza Olympic Stadium) is an Olympic stadium where professional football and baseball have been played. It is located in Puebla, Puebla, Mexico (110 km (68 mi)) east of Mexico City). The stadium was built in 1952 and used by local professional baseball team Pericos de Puebla from 1952 to 1972. It was also used by Club Puebla from 1957 to 1968.

== Notable events ==
In 1981, on 17 and 18 October, British rock band Queen played for the Mexican audience. The first of two concerts was the most significant, because people broke a gate of the stadium, and there were many excesses because people had not seen an event like this before. People threw many objects to stage: shoes, batteries, food, etc. And a pantyhose filled with dust was thrown to the guitar player Brian May. At the end, Freddie Mercury said to the Mexican audience: "Thank you for the shoes..."

== See also ==
- Club Puebla
- Pericos de Puebla
