= Roberto Méndez =

Mexican baseball player

- Second baseman / Shortstop
- Born: 6 March 1947; San Blas, Nayarit, Mexico
- Died: November 28, 2024 (aged 77); Guadalajara, Jalisco, Mexico
- Batted: Right Threw: Right

Member of the Mexican Professional

Baseball Hall of Fame
- Induction: 2000

Roberto Méndez Navarro (March 6, 1947 - November 28, 2024) was a Mexican former professional baseball infielder. He played in the Mexican League, the highest level of professional baseball in Mexico, from 1965 to 1984. He also spent part of 1966 in the Mexican Southeast League. He also managed the Ángeles de Puebla for part of the 1987 season, replacing Rodolfo Sandoval. He was elected to the Mexican Professional Baseball Hall of Fame in 2000.

Méndez also played winter baseball in the Mexican Pacific League for 17 seasons with the Tomateros de Culiacán, Cañeros de Los Mochis, Naranjeros de Hermosillo, Ostioneros de Guaymas and Venados de Mazatlán.

Méndez died on November 28, 2024.
