= Plataneros de Tabasco =

Information
- League: Mexican Southeast League, Liga Mexicana de Béisbol
- Founded: 1964
- Nickname: Plataneros
- League championships: 1964

The Plataneros de Tabasco was a Mexican Southeast League (1964-1966, 1969-1970) and Mexican League (1977-1985) baseball team based in Villahermosa, Tabasco, Mexico. They were champions of the Mexican Southeast League in 1964, managed by Corito Varona.
