= Jorge Calvo (baseball) =

Mexican baseball player and manager

Jorge Calvo (March 4, 1938 – January 28, 2009) was a Mexican baseball player. Jorge played minor league baseball for several seasons, spending parts of three seasons in the Mexican League, the highest level of professional baseball in Mexico. He also managed in the Mexican League for eight years.

He was born in Ocotlan, Jalisco, Mexico.

An outfielder, Calvo's playing career spanned 1960 to 1967. His statistical record is incomplete.

He managed the Ángeles de Puebla in 1973, the Tecolotes de Nuevo Laredo in 1977 and again from 1983 to 1984, the Tecolotes de los Dos Laredos from 1985 to 1986, and the Tigres de México from 1995 to 1996.

He died in Veracruz, Mexico.
