= Mexican Southeast League =

The Mexican Southeast League was a short-season Class-A circuit in Minor league baseball which operated from 1964 through 1970. Throughout its existence, the MSL served as a farm system for the Class Triple-A Mexican League.

== Cities/Teams/Years ==
Cities represented	Teams	Year(s)
Campeche, Campeche	Piratas de Campeche; Camaroneros de Campeche	1964–1968; 1970; 1969
Ciudad del Carmen, Campeche	Camaroneros de Ciudad del Carmen	1967–1970
Coatzacoalcos, Veracruz	Porteños de Puerto México; Charros de Puerto México	1964–1968; 1969–1970
Las Choapas, Veracruz	Diablos Rojos de Las Choapas	1967–1969
Mérida, Yucatán	Venados de Yucatán	1964–1969
Minatitlán, Veracruz	Petroleros de Minatitlán; Diablos Rojos de Minatitlán	1968; 1969
Orizaba, Veracruz	Cerveceros de Orizaba; Charros de Orizaba	1966; 1967
Villahermosa, Tabasco	Plataneros de Tabasco; Ganaderos de Tabasco	1964–1966; 1969–1970; 1967–1968

== Champions ==
The following is a list of champions of the Mexican Southeast League.

Team	Champions	Runners-up	Winning seasons	Runners-up seasons
Piratas de Campeche	2	4	1965, 1967	1964, 1966, 1968, 1970
Plataneros de Tabasco	1	1	1964	1965
Camaroneros de Ciudad del Carmen	1	1	1968	1967
Porteños de Puerto México	1	0	1966	–
Camaroneros de Campeche	1	0	1969	–
Charros de Puerto México	1	0	1970	–
Diablos Rojos de Minatitlán	0	1	–	1969

== Noted players ==
- Pompeyo Davalillo
- Pancho Herrera
- Minnie Miñoso
- Héctor Rodríguez
- Celerino Sánchez
- Angel Scull
- René Valdés
- Benny Valenzuela

== Sources ==
- Johnson, Lloyd; Wolff, Miles (1993). Encyclopedia of Minor League Baseball. Baseball America. ISBN 978-0-96-371898-3
- Treto Cisneros, Pedro (2002). The Mexican League/La Liga Mexicana: Comprehensive Player Statistics, 1937-2001. McFarland & Company. ISBN 978-0-78-641378-2
