= Aquiles Serdán =

Mexican politician

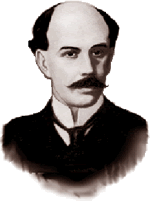
- Born: November 2, 1876; Puebla, Mexico
- Died: November 18, 1910 (aged 34); Puebla, Mexico
- Parent: Manuel Serdán (father)

Aquiles Serdán Alatriste (2 November 1876 – 18 November 1910) was a Mexican politician. He was born in the city of Puebla, Puebla, and was a supporter of the Mexican Revolution led by Francisco I. Madero.

His family was politically active and involved. His grandfather, Miguel C. Alatriste, was a strong liberal during the Reform, and served as governor of the state of Puebla in 1857. During the French Intervention, Alatriste fought against the invaders and their Mexican conservative allies, was captured and executed. His father, Manuel Serdán, was one of the founders of the Partido Socialista Mexicano (Mexican Socialist Party), and co-authored La Ley del Pueblo that called for agrarian reform. Manuel Serdán disappeared, perhaps murdered by authorities.

Aquiles Serdán was a shoemaker by trade, as was his father, Manuel Serdán. He read Francisco I. Madero's 1909 book, The Presidential Succession of 1910, in which Madero laid out the problems of Mexico under Porfirio Díaz's rule and called for open elections. Serdán corresponded with Madero and organized an Anti-Reelectionist Club in the city of Puebla, joined mainly by textile workers. He became a revolutionary, opposing Díaz. Serdán was arrested by Díaz's government, spending October - December 1909 in prison.

He actively campaigned for Madero in the 1910 presidential elections, but when Madero was arrested and fraudulent elections held, Serdán left for the United States. After the Electoral College declared Díaz and Ramón Corral victors in the 1910 elections, Serdán is reported to have said, "Do not intone the hosanna of Victory, Señores Porfiristas and Corralistas, for we Anti-Reelectionists have not yet fired the last cartridge."

When Madero escaped jail in 1910 and issued the Plan of San Luis Potosí, which called for rebellion throughout Mexico on November 20, 1910, Serdán returned to Puebla to organize revolution there. He and his brother Máximo bought arms and raised support from men to bear them. His sister Carmen Serdán went to San Antonio, Texas, a center of exiled Mexican revolutionaries, and obtained 20,000 pesos for the rebellion.

The Díaz government got wind of the Serdán's revolutionary activities and the Puebla police chief and men under his command came to the Serdán family home, where violence ensued on 18 November 1910. Serdán, his brother Máximo, and his wife, mother, and sister Carmen, along with nine men, defended the house. Although he had hopes that the city of Puebla would rise, it did not and the government forces killed Serdán, losing 158 of its own men. When Madero heard of Serdán's death, he is reported to have said, "It does not matter. They have shown us how to die."

The northern municipality of Aquiles Serdán, Chihuahua, was renamed in his honor in 1932; he is also remembered by Metro Aquiles Serdán, a station on the Mexico City Metro. His house on Santa Clara Street in the center of Puebla is a museum and remains as he left it the day he was killed.
