= Rodolfo Sandoval (baseball) =

Mexican baseball player

- Catcher
- Born: 25 January 1937; Guaymas, Sonora, Mexico
- Bats: Right Throws: Right

Member of the Mexican Professional

Baseball Hall of Fame
- Induction: 2001

Rodolfo "Rudy" Sandoval (born 25 January 1937) is a Mexican professional baseball player who played from 1953 to 1976 and from 1979 to 1980, including 24 seasons in the Mexican League, the highest level of professional baseball in Mexico. He also managed in the league for eight seasons. He was elected to the Mexican Professional Baseball Hall of Fame in 2001.
