= Mexican Central League =

Mexican Minor League Baseball circuit

- Classification: Class D (1960); Class C (1961–62); Class A (1963–78)
- Sport: Baseball
- Founded: 1960
- Folded: 1978
- Country: Mexico

The Mexican Central League was a Minor League Baseball circuit that operated for 19 seasons, from 1960 through 1978, with several clubs based across Mexico, primarily in the Northern Mexico, Bajío and Huasteca regions.

== History ==
The Mexican Central League was formed in 1960 at the Class D level. It was placed in Class C in 1961, where it remained through the 1962 season. Upon the reorganization of Minor League Baseball in 1963, it was reclassified as Class A. In 1979, the circuit was absorbed into the expanded Mexican Baseball League (Liga Mexicana de Beisbol). This expansion elevated the Mexican Central League teams to Triple-A, with the newly expanded Mexican Baseball League featuring a 20-team circuit with four divisions.

== Cities represented/teams ==
- Acámbaro, Guanajuato
  Acámbaro (1975–1976)
- Aguascalientes, Aguascalientes
  Tigres de Aguascalientes (1960–1963; 1965; 1969–1974)
  Broncos de Aguascalientes (1966–1967)
- Arandas, Jalisco
  Arandas (1977)
  Jalisco (1977)
- Celaya, Guanajuato
  Cajeteros de Celaya (1960–1961; 1975)
- Cerro Azul, Veracruz
  Cerro Azul (1978)
- Ciudad Madero, Tamaulipas
  Bravos de Ciudad Madero (1968–1970)
- Ciudad Mante, Tamaulipas
  Broncos de Ciudad Mante (1969–1970)
  Cañeros de Ciudad Mante (1971)
  Azucareros de Ciudad Mante (1973–1974)
  Ciudad Mante (1977)
- Ciudad Miguel Alemán, Tamaulipas
  Miguel Alemán (1978)
- Ciudad Valles, San Luis Potosí
  Ciudad Valles (1974, 1978)
- Ciudad Victoria, Tamaulipas
  Henequeneros de Ciudad Victoria (1971; 1973-1974)
  Ciudad Victoria (1976 –1978)
- Cortazar, Guanajuato
  Cortazar (1975)
- Durango, Durango
  Alacranes de Durango (1965–1967; 1973–1974)
  Algodoneros de Durango (1972)
- Ebano, San Luis Potosí
  Rojos de Ebano (1971–1974)
  Ebano (1977)
- Fresnillo, Zacatecas
  Rojos de Fresnillo (1962)
  Charros de Fresnillo (1964)
  Mineros de Fresnillo (1965–1968; 1976–1978)
- Guadalajara, Jalisco
  Charros de Guadalajara (1977–1978)
- Guanajuato, Guanajuato
  Tuzos de Guanajuato (1960–1967; 1975–1976; 1978)
- Gustavo Díaz Ordaz, Tamaulipas
  Díaz Ordaz (1978)
- La Barca, Jalisco
  La Barca (1978)
- Lagos de Moreno, Jalisco
  Lagos de Moreno Caporales (1975–1977)
- León, Guanajuato
  Diablos Rojos de León (1960)
  Aguilas de León (1961)
  Diablos Verdes de León (1962–1963; 1965-1966)
  Broncos de León (1964)
  Bravos de León (1967; 1971; 1975)
  Aguiluchos de León (1968–1970)
- Matamoros, Tamaulipas
  Matamoros (1978)
- Monterrey, Nuevo León
  Indios de Monterrey (1970–1971)
  Sultanes de Monterrey (1972)
- Morelia, Michoacán
  Tigres de Morelia (1966)
- Naranjos, Veracruz
  Naranjos (1972–1973)
- Nuevo Laredo, Tamaulipas
  Tecolotes de Nuevo Laredo (1968)
- Parras de la Fuente, Coahuila
  Saraperos de Parras (1974)
- Salamanca, Guanajuato
  Petroleros de Salamanca (1960–1962; 1975)
  Tigres de Salamanca (1964–1965)
- Saltillo, Coahuila
  Sultanes de Saltillo (1964)
  Saraperos de Saltillo (1967–1969)
- San Luis Potosí, San Luis Potosí
  Tuneros de San Luis Potosí (1960–1962)
  Indios de San Luis Potosí (1963)
  Rojos de San Luis Potosí (1963–1966)
  Charros de San Luis Potosí (1969–1970)
  Tuneros de San Luis Potosí (1971)
- San Pedro, Coahuila
  Algodoneros de San Pedro (1974)
- Silao, Guanajuato
  Catarinos de Silao (1978)
- Tampico, Tamaulipas
  Piratas de Tampico (1967–1969)
  Algodoneros de Tampico (1970)
- Tamuín, San Luis Potosí
  Tamuin Cafeteritos (1973)
- Teocaltiche, Jalisco
  Teocaltiche (1977–1978)
- Torreón, Coahuila
  Algodoneros de Torreón (1968)
- Uriangato, Guanajuato
  Uriangato (1975)
- Zacatecas, Zacatecas
  Pericos de Zacatecas (1965–1967)
  Petroleros de Zacatecas (1968–1970)
  Tuzos de Zacatecas (1971–1973; 1976–1978)

== Winners ==
The following is a list of winners of the Mexican Central League.

Team	Winners	Runners-up	Winning seasons	Runners-up seasons
Tigres de Aguascalientes	2	2	1961, 1972	1962, 1963
Tuzos de Guanajuato	2	2	1963, 1966	1964, 1976
Rojos de Ébano	1	2	1971	1972, 1973
Rojos de San Luis Potosí	1	1	1965	1966
Saraperos de Saltillo	1	1	1968	1967
Bravos de Ciudad Madero	1	1	1970	1968
Petroleros de Salamanca	1	0	1960	–
Rojos de Fresnillo	1	0	1962	–
Broncos de León	1	0	1964	–
Bravos de León	1	0	1967	–
Charros de San Luis Potosí	1	0	1969	–
Tuzos de Zacatecas	1	0	1973	–
Alacranes de Durango	1	0	1974	–
Uriangato	1	0	1975	–
Caporales de Lagos de Moreno	1	0	1976	–
Teocaltiche	1	0	1977	–
La Barca	1	0	1978	–
Cajeteros de Celaya	0	2	–	1960, 1961
Diablos Verdes de León	0	1	–	1965
Petroleros de Zacatecas	0	1	–	1969
Algodoneros de Tampico	0	1	–	1970
Tuneros de San Luis Potosí	0	1	–	1971
Valles de Ciudad Valles	0	1	–	1974
Cortázar	0	1	–	1975
Ciudad Victoria	0	1	–	1977
Matamoros	0	1	–	1978

== Notable players ==
- 21 (Mexico) Héctor Espino – Began his career in 1960 with the Tuneros de San Luis Potosí
- 34 (Mexico) Fernando Valenzuela – Began his career in 1978 with the Tuzos de Guanajuato

== See also ==
- Baseball awards#Mexico
