= Alberto Romo Chávez =

Mexican baseball player

- Pitcher
- Born: 11 September 1911; Jaral del Progreso, Guanajuato, Mexico
- Died: 24 August 1999 (aged 87); Aguascalientes, Aguascalientes, Mexico
- Threw: Right

Member of the Mexican Professional

Baseball Hall of Fame
- Induction: 1971

Alberto Romo Chávez (11 September 1911 – 24 August 1999) was a Mexican professional baseball pitcher. He played 14 seasons in the Mexican League from 1932 to 1946, considered as one of the best pitchers in Mexico. He was inducted into the Mexican Professional Baseball Hall of Fame as part of the class of 1971.

== Career ==
Romo Chávez was born in Jaral del Progreso, Guanajuato on 11 September 1911. His father was a railway worker, so his family constantly moved from one city to another around Mexico. Shortly after Alberto was born, the Romo Chávez family settled in Aguascalientes.

He moved to Mexico City and started his professional career in the Mexican League in 1932 with Obras Públicas. He played with Obras Públicas for one more season, for Monte de Piedad from 1934 to 1935, for Agrario from 1936 to 1938, for Indios de Anáhuac in 1939 and from 1940 to 1946 (except the 1945 season) for Diablos Rojos del México. According to special compilations (the Mexican League started compiling statistics in 1937), Romo Chávez had a 69–22 record from 1933 to 1936 and a 46–36 record from 1937 to 1946.

Romo Chávez played on the Mexico national baseball team that competed at the 1938 Central American and Caribbean Games in Panama City; he posted a 1–1 record, allowing 4 earned runs and notching 4 strikeouts in 17.2 innings pitched.

Romo Chávez appeared in the 1964 film El Alazán y el Rosillo with Antonio Aguilar.

== Legacy ==
Cuban manager León Rojas named Romo Chávez as one of the "pitchers of caliber" of international baseball in the 1940s, alongside figures such as Pedro "Natilla" Jiménez and Agapito Mayor.

Aguascalientes baseball stadium, Parque de Béisbol Alberto Romo Chávez, home of the Rieleros de Aguascalientes since 1975, was named in his honor. The ballpark, originally inaugurated on 20 April 1945 with the name Estadio Aguascalientes, was re-inaugurated on 25 August 1957 and renamed after Romo Chávez. The name was chosen in a poll conducted by El Sol del Centro newspaper.

Romo Chávez was inducted into the Mexican Professional Baseball Hall of Fame in 1971 together with Beto Ávila, Chile Gómez, Melo Almada, Jesús Valenzuela, Alejandro Aguilar Reyes, Jorge Pasquel, Ernesto Carmona, Roy Campanella, Josh Gibson and Monte Irvin.

== Death ==
Romo Chávez died on 24 August 1999 in Aguascalientes, aged 87.
