= Baseball in Mexico =

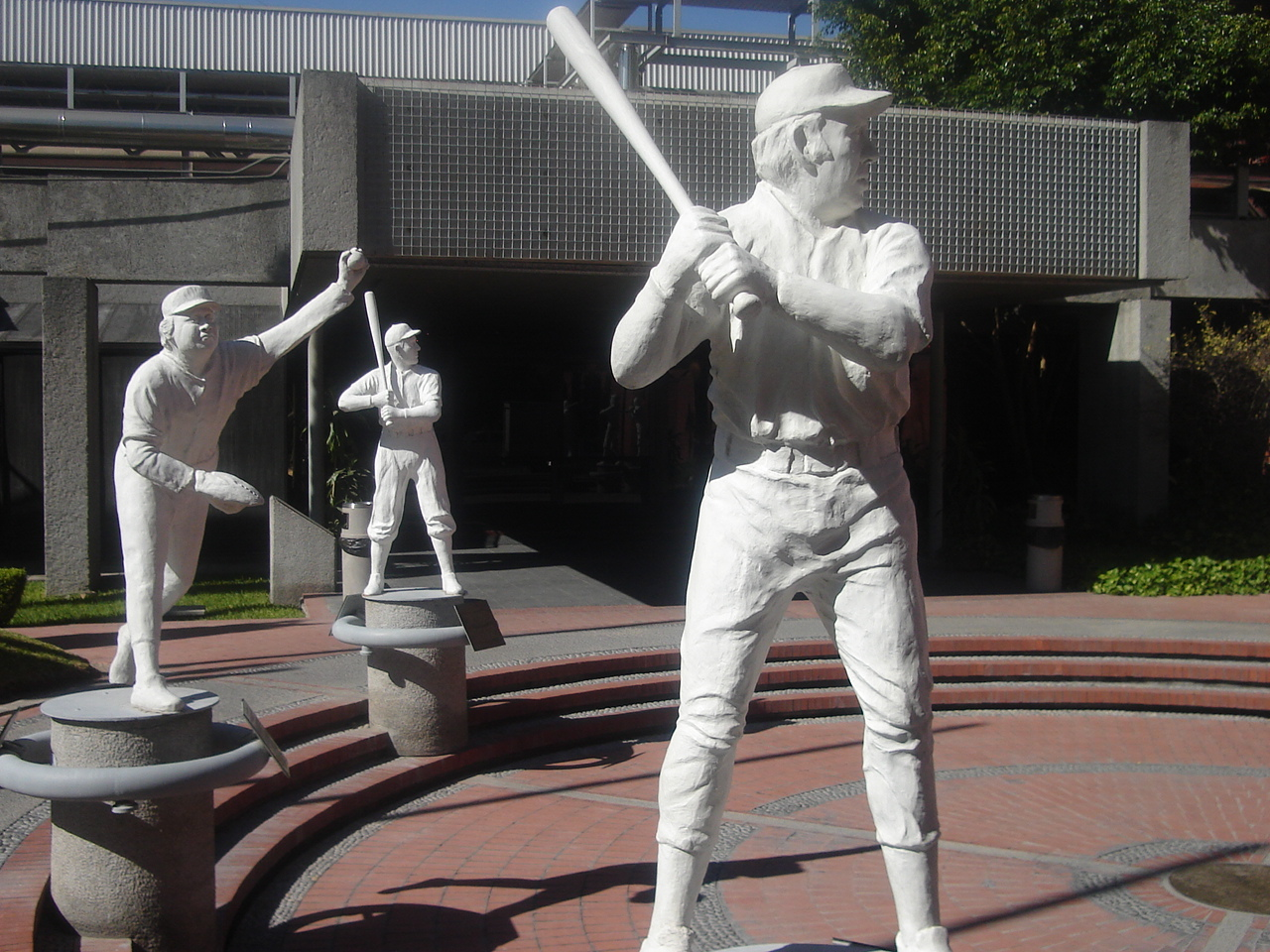
- Statues outside of the Mexican Professional Baseball Hall of Fame.
- Country: Mexico
- National team: Mexico

Club competitions
- Mexican League * North division * South division Liga Norte de Mexico; Mexican Academy League; Mexican Pacific League

International competitions
- World Baseball Classic (2006–present); Caribbean Series (1971–present); Pan American Games (1951–present); Baseball World Cup (1941–1965)

Baseball first rose to popularity in Mexico during the 1880s, and may have been introduced there as early as 1846. Mexico's current premier baseball league, the Mexican Baseball League, was founded in 1925 and consists of two divisions with 16 teams in total. The Mexican League has been classified as a Triple-A level league since 1967, and was classified as a Double-A league before then.

The sport has traditionally been considered one of the most popular sports in Mexico, second only to football in some areas. Baseball is primarily popular in the northern part of the country, in the states nearest the Mexico–United States border. Over 120 different players have made appearances for Major League Baseball teams, the first being Mel Almada who played for the Boston Red Sox starting in 1933. Other notable Mexican MLB players include Fernando Valenzuela, Vinny Castilla, Alejandro Kirk, Joakim Soria, and Julio Urias.

== History ==
The exact origin of baseball in Mexico is unclear. While some sources claim that the sport came to Mexico along with American soldiers during the Mexican–American War, others believe it actually arrived via Cuba during the 1880s. The building of the Mexican Central Railway as well as America's economic and political interest in Mexico during the 1880s also played a part in the spread of baseball's popularity south of the Rio Grande.

In 1925, the Mexican League (Spanish: Liga Mexicana de Béisbol or LMB) was founded. The Mexican League became a heavy competitor of MLB, going after players from the U.S. Negro Leagues and various Caribbean leagues. When MLB was interested in a player who signed with the Mexican League, they had an agreement with LMB to pay a fee to the Mexican League in order to use that player. This added cost discouraged MLB from using Mexican players because they didn't want to pay the competing league money. Other leagues like the Cuban League and a league in the Dominican Republic decided to work with MLB, but the Mexican League did not want to participate. All of these leagues contributed to an eventual inclusive baseball league. More than a quarter of all major league baseball players are now Latino. The league initially had 6 teams, and eventually expanded to its 16.

The first Mexican-born player to play in the MLB was Mel Almeda, an outfielder from Huatabampo, who made his debut for the Boston Red Sox on September 8, 1933. Almeda was born in Mexico but grew up in Los Angeles, as his father was a consul for the Mexican government. It would be 16 years before another Mexican-born player would play in MLB, when Bobby Ávila made his debut for the Cleveland Indians in 1947.

After World War II, hundreds of MLB players returned from the war creating a huge market with low demand. Club owners from MLB seized the opportunity to offer poor contracts to the players lacking free agency and union representation. In 1946, then-owner of the LMB, Jorge Pasquel, attempted to elevate the level of competition in the league by offering contracts to several American MLB players. While mostly only Negro league players ended up coming to play in Mexico, contracts were also offered to (and subsequently declined by) superstar players such as Joe DiMaggio, Minnie Miñoso, and Ted Williams, however, 18 other major leaguers signed for the 1946 summer season. At the end of the summer season, top African American and Latin American players had earned more than many players in MLB; therefore, major league players started to come to the LMB looking for better salaries, initiating the conflict with MLB.

In response to the loss of players to Mexico, the commissioner of MLB at the time, Happy Chandler, enacted a rule that banned players from the league for 5 years if they signed contracts outside of MLB; moreover, they banned the 18 players that signed with the LMB from playing for any team participating in MLB. Later, MLB threatened to suspend any players playing with or against the banned or blacklisted players. This largely hindered the growth of the LMB during this time. In 1950, the LMB and MLB reached an agreement stating that they would respect each other's contracts. Notable American former LMB players include Satchel Paige and Roy Campanella.

In 2018, after complaints about Julio Urías's loss of his signing bonus to his former LMB club, MLB decided to sever their relationship with the Mexican League. This choice effectively bans all MLB teams from signing players directly out of the LMB, which may prevent some top Mexican prospects from making their way to the Majors.

== Professional baseball ==
In 1925, the Mexican League was formed by sports journalist Alejandro Aguilar Reyes and his friend Ernesto Carmona. The league was founded with six teams, none of which still operate in the LMB. During the 1960s, the league expanded to 8 teams, and again to 10 teams in 1970. In 1979, the LMB absorbed the Mexican Central League, which expanded the league to 20 teams. After a series of financial failures, the league was reduced to 14 teams. The league has expanded since to its current lineup of 18 teams in two divisions. It is considered to be a AAA-level league.

Teams in the LMB play 120 games from March to September, and each team plays each other team either six or nine times per season. Like in the MLB, the LMB holds an All-star game as well as a four-level postseason.

The team with the most championships are the Diablos Rojos del México.

The Mexican Pacific League (Spanish: Liga Mexicana de Pacífico or LMP) is an independent league unaffiliated with the LMB. It has existed since 1945, and currently fields 10 teams from throughout Mexico. Its champions are invited to compete in the Caribbean Series after winning the LMP championship.

The Mexican League also has an affiliated minor league, the Liga Norte de México.

== International play ==
Mexican teams have competed in the Caribbean Series since 1971, winning the championship 3 times in 4 years from 2013 to 2016. The series has been held in Mexico 15 times since then, for the first time in Hermosillo in 1974. The Caribbean Series' first Mexican champions were the Naranjeros de Hermosillo in 1976. Mexico has also competed in the Pan American Games and the Baseball World Cup, performing well but never finishing first. In 2006, the Mexico national baseball team made their first appearance at the inaugural World Baseball Classic, and has been a mainstay in the tournament, and have consistently hosted WBC games ever since.

== See also ==
- Mexican League
- Mexico national baseball team
- Sport in Mexico
