= Alcaraz (surname) =

Alcaraz is a surname originally from Spain. Notable people with the name include:

- Antolín Alcaraz (born 1982), Paraguayan footballer
- Andrés Alcaraz (17th century), 15th Governor-General of the Philippines of the Philippines
- Aleix Alcaraz (born 1990), Spanish racing driver
- Arturo Alcaraz (1916–2001), Filipino volcanologist known for his work on geothermal energy
- Beya Alcaraz (born 1996), member of the San Francisco Board of Supervisors
- Carlos Alcaraz (born 2003), Spanish tennis player
- Charly Alcaraz (born 2002), Argentine footballer
- Felipe Alcaraz (born 1943), Spanish politician
- Francisco Alcaraz (disambiguation), multiple people, including:
  - Francisco Alcaraz (footballer) (born 1960), Paraguayan footballer
  - Francisco Alcaraz (umpire) (1920–1996), Mexican League baseball umpire
- Gaylon Alcaraz (born 1970), community organizer and human rights activist
- J. P. Alcaraz, Filipino basketball player
- Lalo Alcaraz (born 1964), American cartoonist
- Lucas Alcaraz (born 1966), Spanish footballer
- Luis Alcaraz (born 1941), Puerto Rican baseball player
- Marco Alcaraz (born 1983), Filipino basketball player, actor and model
- Oscar M. Alcaraz (1953–1970), Filipino boy scout
- Ramón Alcaraz, officer in the Mexican Army and writer
- Ramon A. Alcaraz (1915–2009), officer in the Philippine Navy
- Rubén Alcaraz (born 1991), Spanish footballer
