= José Guerrero (baseball) =

Mexican baseball player

- Guerrero as manager for the Tecolotes de los Dos Laredos
- Third baseman / Manager
- Born: 12 July 1926; Torreón, Coahuila, Mexico
- Died: 7 December 2009 (aged 83); Torreón, Coahuila, Mexico
- Batted: Right Threw: Right

Career highlights and awards
- Algodoneros de Unión Laguna #49 retired

Member of the Mexican Professional

Baseball Hall of Fame
- Induction: 1989

José Guerrero Muñoz (12 July 1926 – 7 December 2009), nicknamed "Zacatillo", was a Mexican professional baseball third baseman and manager. He spent most of his Mexican League career with Unión Laguna in his native Torreón (1949–1953, 1972–1974), but also played with México, Puebla, and Monterrey. He holds the record for the most wins as a manager in Mexican League, with 1,976 victories.

== Early life ==
Guerrero was born on 12 July 1926 in Torreón, Coahuila. As a youth, he played baseball in a local team in the San Antonio de los Bravos ejido in the outskirts of Torreón alongside his brothers, Javier and Amador, and his father. Later, he moved to Ciudad Juárez, Chihuahua, where he studied in the Hermanos Escobar School of Agriculture. Upon graduating, he returned to Torreón in 1943 to take charge of the family ranch.

== Professional career ==
=== Mexican League ===
Guerrero played with the Altos Hornos de México club in Monclova in 1948, before making his Mexican League debut with Unión Laguna de Torreón in 1949. He played for Torreón from 1949 to 1953 and was part of the squad that won the 1950 Mexican League championship.

After a spell in the Arizona–Texas League and the Arizona–Mexico League, Guerrero returned to the Mexican League with the Sultanes de Monterrey, where he played from 1957 to 1959. He played for the Pericos de Puebla from 1961 to 1964 and again in 1967, Águila de Veracruz in 1965, Diablos Rojos del México from 1970 to 1971, and Torreón again from 1972 to 1974. He finished his Mexican League career with a .301 batting average.

Mexican League career statistics
Seasons	G	AB	R	H	2B	3B	HR	RBI	SB	BB	BA	SLG
19	1330	4832	717	1466	209	54	51	553	107	434	.303	.401

=== Mexican Pacific League ===
Guerrero played winter ball with several teams in the Mexican Pacific League, including the Venados de Mazatlán (1950–1957), Pericos de Puebla (1958–1961), Cañeros de Los Mochis (1962–1964) and Empalme (1965).

== Legacy and death ==
Guerrero was inducted into the Mexican Professional Baseball Hall of Fame in 1989, alongside infielder Ray Dandridge, executive Teodoro Mariscal and broadcaster Oscar Esquivel. In 2007, the Algodoneros retired Guerrero's number 49. He died on 7 December 2009 in Torreón, aged 83.
