= Alejandro Aguilar =

Alejandro Aguilar may refer to:

- Alejandro Aguilar (footballer) (born 1990), Costa Rican football forward
- Alejandro Aguilar López (born 1963), Mexican politician from Tlaxcala
- Alejandro Aguilar Reyes (1902–1961), Mexican sportswriter and baseball pioneer
- Alejandro Aguilar (actor) (born 1982), Colombian actor, appeared in Playing with Fire (2019 TV series) et al.

== See also ==
- Alex Aguilar, Spanish biologist
