= Leo Rodriguez =

Leo Rodriguez may refer to:

- Leo Rodriguez (singer) (born 1991), Brazilian singer and songwriter
- Leo Rodríguez (baseball) (1929–2011), baseball player
- Leonardo Rodríguez (born 1966), Argentine footballer
- Eulogio Rodriguez (politician born 1959), Filipino politician

== See also ==
- Leonardo Rodríguez (disambiguation)
- Leonor Rodríguez (born 1991), Spanish basketball player
