= Francisco Alcaraz =

Francisco Alcaraz may refer to:

- Francisco Alcaraz (footballer) (born 1960), Paraguayan footballer
- Francisco Alcaraz (umpire) (1920–1996), Mexican League baseball umpire
- Francisco José Alcaraz (born 1968), Spanish politician and activist

== See also ==
- Alcaraz (surname)
