= Fernando Barradas =

Mexican baseball player

- Pitcher
- Born: 20 May 1905; Rancho de Santa Rita, Veracruz, Mexico
- Died: 20 December 1995 (aged 90)
- Batted: Left Threw: Left

Member of the Mexican Professional

Baseball Hall of Fame
- Induction: 1939
Medals
Men's baseball
Representing Mexico
Central American and Caribbean Games
Silver medal – second place	1930 Havana	Team

Fernando Barradas Villavalso (20 May 1905 – 20 December 1995) (Note: Baseball Reference gives Barradas' birth date as May 20, 1905, while the Mexican Professional Baseball Hall of Fame website lists May 20, 1910.) was a Mexican professional baseball pitcher and first baseman. He was inducted into the Mexican Professional Baseball Hall of Fame in its inaugural class of 1939.

== Career ==
Barradas debuted with the Mexico national baseball team at 19 years old, earning the win against Cuba at the 1930 Central American and Caribbean Games held in Havana. He pitched 15.1 innings, working to a 1.76 earned run average (ERA) and striking out 16.

From 1936 to 1944, Barradas played in the Mexican League with several clubs, including Agrario (1938), Indios de Anáhuac (1939), Azules de Veracruz (1942–44), and Rojos del México and Ángeles de Puebla (both 1944).
