= Jesús Díaz (baseball) =

Mexican baseball player and coach

- Díaz in 1952 with the Charros de Jalisco
- Outfielder / Manager
- Born: 18 January 1925; Torreón, Coahuila, Mexico
- Died: 30 March 1988 (aged 63); Tijuana, Baja California, Mexico
- Batted: Right Threw: Right

Career highlights and awards
- Mexican League Rookie of the Year (1942)

Member of the Mexican Professional

Baseball Hall of Fame
- Induction: 1979

Jesús "Chanquilón" Díaz (18 January 1925 – 30 March 1988) was a Mexican professional baseball outfielder and manager. He played 16 seasons in the Mexican League, most of them as center fielder. He was enshrined into the Mexican Professional Baseball Hall of Fame in 1979.

== Career ==
Chanquilón Díaz was born on 18 January 1925 in Torreón, Coahuila. He made his professional debut in the Mexican League in 1942 with Unión Laguna de Torreón, winning the league championship and the Rookie of the Year Award.

In 1944, he left Torreón and played for La Junta de Nuevo Laredo for two seasons. He returned to Torreón in 1946. In 1947 he played for Pericos de Puebla and Tuneros de San Luis Potosí. In 1948 he played again for Puebla and returned to Torreón in 1949. In 1950, Díaz and Unión Laguna won the Mexican League championship and he finished as the home runs leader with 10, tied with Ángel Castro.

He played two seasons in the Cuban League for Habana and Marianao. In the 1946–47 season, Chanquilón finished with 16 runs, 35 hits, one home run, 15 RBIs and a batting average of .238 in 147 at bats with Habana and Marianao. In 1947–48, he played for Marianao, recording 35 runs, 57 hits, seven home runs and 15 RBIs and a .243 average; finishing as the leader in home runs.

In 1952, Díaz was transferred to the Charros de Jalisco. In 1953 he played for the Laredo Apaches of the class B Gulf Coast League and for the Indios de Anáhuac, where he was player-manager; the team folded after 60 games and finished fourth. In 1955, he joined the Diablos Rojos del México but was transferred to El Águila de Veracruz during the season, where he also played in 1956. In 1957 he played for Nuevo Laredo and Leones de Yucatán. He last played for Puebla in 1960.

Díaz played 16 seasons in the Mexican League, totalling 4038 at bats, 1148 hits and a batting average of .284.

Chanquilón Díaz was elected to the Mexican Professional Baseball Hall of Fame in 1979 together with Basilio Rosell.

He died on 30 March 1988 in Tijuana, Baja California, aged 63.

== Career statistics ==
=== Cuban League ===
Season	Team	G	AB	R	H	2B	3B	HR	RBI	SB	BA
1946–47	Habana / Marianao		147	16	34	4	2	1	15	3	.238
1947–48	Marianao		235	35	57	5	4	7	15	3	.243
Total (2 seasons)			382	51	92	9	6	8	30	6	.241

== Managerial statistics ==
=== Mexican League ===
Year	Team	Regular season						Postseason			
Year	Team	Games	Won	Lost	Tied	Pct.	Finish	Won	Lost	Pct.	Notes
1953	Indios de Anáhuac	60	29	31	0	.483	4th	–	–	–	–
Total		60	29	31	0	.483					
