= Mario Arencibia =

Cuban baseball player

- Outfielder
- Born: September 25, 1924; Encrucijada, Cuba

debut
- 1948, for the New York Cubans

Last appearance
- 1948, for the Indios de Anahuac
- Stats at Baseball Reference

Teams
- New York Cubans (1948); Tuneros de San Luis Potosí (1950); Diablos Rojos del México (1950); Charros de Jalisco (1950–1952); Indios de Anahuac (1953)

Eduardo Mario Arencibia (born September 25, 1924) is a Cuban former baseball outfielder in the Negro leagues and in the Mexican League. He played from 1948 to 1953 with several teams.
