= Jesse Flores =

Jesse Flores may refer to:

- Jesse Flores (baseball) (1914–1991), Major League Baseball pitcher
- Jesse Flores (tennis) (born 1995), Costa Rican tennis player
- Jesse Flores (The Sarah Connor Chronicles), a fictional character
