= 1942 Mexican Baseball League season =

1942 Mexican League season
- League: Mexican League
- Sport: Baseball
- Teams: 6
- Season champions: Unión Laguna de Torreón

LMB seasons
- ← 1941 1943 →

The 1942 Mexican League season was the 18th season in the history of the Mexican League. It was contested by six teams. Unión Laguna de Torreón won the championship by finishing the season first with a record of 48 wins and 40 losses, led by player-manager Martín Dihigo.

== Standings ==
Regular season standings
Pos	Team	W	L	Pct.	GB
1	Unión Laguna de Torreón	48	40	.545	—
2	Industriales de Monterrey	46	41	.529	1.5
3	Alijadores de Tampico	44	40	.524	2.0
4	Pericos de Puebla	42	45	.483	5.5
5	Diablos Rojos del México	40	47	.460	7.5
6	Azules de Veracruz	39	46	.459	7.5

== League leaders ==
Batting leaders
Stat	Player	Team	Total
AVG	(United States) Monte Irvin	Azules	.397
HR	(United States) Monte Irvin	Azules	20
RBI	(Cuba) Silvio García	México	83
R	(Cuba) Carlos Colás	Torreón	83
H	(Cuba) Carlos Colás	Torreón	128
SB	(Cuba) Pedro Pagés	Puebla	30

Pitching leaders
Stat	Player	Team	Total
ERA	(Cuba) Martín Dihigo	Torreón	2.53
W	(Mexico) Jesús Valenzuela	Tampico	25
K	(Cuba) Martín Dihigo	Torreón	211

== Milestones ==
=== Pitchers ===
- Martín Dihigo (Torreón): Dihigo won his second Pitching Triple Crown in the Mexican League with an ERA of 2.53, 22 wins and 211 strikeouts.

== Awards ==
Award	Player	Team	Ref.
Rookie of the Year	(Mexico) Jesús Díaz	Torreón	
