= Gregorio Luque =

Mexican baseball player and manager (1942–2026)

- Catcher / Manager
- Born: 9 May 1942; Nogales, Sonora, Mexico
- Died: 26 February 2026 (aged 83); Nogales, Sonora, Mexico
- Batted: Right Threw: Right

Member of the Mexican Professional

Baseball Hall of Fame
- Induction: 1999

Gregorio Luque Flores (9 May 1942 – 26 February 2026) was a Mexican professional baseball catcher and manager. Luque played and managed in the Mexican League. Elected to the Mexican Professional Baseball Hall of Fame in 1999, he played professionally from 1961 to 1980 and managed from 1976 to 1994.

== Career ==
Luque was born in Nogales, Sonora, on 9 May 1942. He made his debut in the Mexican League (LMB) in 1963 with the Tigres de México, where he played until 1970. In 1971, he signed with the Saraperos de Saltillo, where he played until his retirement in 1980. From 1976 to 1980, he served as player-manager, and in 1981 he served only as manager, winning the 1980 LMB championship with the club.

He finished his Mexican League career as player with 1,569 games, 1,299 hits, 526 RBIs, and a .264 batting average.

Luque continued his career as manager in 1982 with the Sultanes de Monterrey; in 1983 with the Tigres de México; from 1984 to 1985 with the Alijadores de Tampico; from 1986 to 1989 with the Tuneros de San Luis; from 1990 to 1991 with the Acereros de Monclova; in 1992 with the Industriales de Monterrey and the Rieleros de Aguascalientes; in 1993 with the Pericos de Puebla; and in 1994 with the Algodoneros de Unión Laguna.

He also played winter league baseball from 1962 to 1978 with the Cañeros de Los Mochis of the Mexican Pacific League. He finished his Mexican Pacific League career with 933 games, 695 hits, 236 RBIs and a .219 batting average.

In 1999, he was elected to the Mexican Professional Baseball Hall of Fame alongside pitchers George Brunet and Francisco Maytorena, and executive Pedro Treto Cisneros.

== Death ==
Luque died in his native Nogales on 26 February 2026, at the age of 83.
