= Carlos Galina =

Mexican baseball player (1920–1986)

- First baseman
- Born: 20 June 1920; Azcapotzalco, Mexico City, Mexico
- Died: 23 May 1986 (aged 65); Mexico City, Mexico
- Batted: Left Threw: Left

Member of the Mexican Professional

Baseball Hall of Fame
- Induction: 1994
Medals
Men's baseball
Representing Mexico
Baseball World Cup
Bronze medal – third place	1941 Havana	Team

Carlos Galina Figueroa (20 June 1920 – 23 May 1986) was a Mexican professional baseball first baseman. Galina spent 14 seasons in the Mexican Baseball League and is considered one of the best first basemen in the league's history. He was enshrined into the Mexican Professional Baseball Hall of Fame in 1994.

== Early life ==
Galina was born on 20 June 1920 in the Azcapotzalco municipality of Mexico City. He studied at the National Autonomous University of Mexico, where he played baseball for the university’s team, the Pumas.

== Playing career ==
Galina made his debut in the Mexican Baseball League in 1937 at age 16 with the Petroleros de México, recording a .337 batting average and six home runs, becoming the league’s first home run champion. (Note: The Mexican Baseball League was established in 1925, but it did not officially recorded statistics until 1937; thus, the 1937 home run champion was the first to be recognized.)

Following his debut season, Galina went on to play for the Tigres de Comintra from 1938 to 1939, Rojos del Águila de Veracruz in 1939, and Carta Blanca from 1940 to 1941.

Galina represented Mexico at the 1941 Amateur World Series, played in Havana, Cuba, where the team finished third under manager Ernesto Carmona. He was selected by the press as the tournament’s best first baseman.

He later joined Pericos de Puebla from 1942 to 1944 and again in 1946, a year in which he also appeared for El Águila de Veracruz and Tuneros de San Luis Potosí. He then played for Indios de Ciudad Juárez of the Arizona–Texas League in 1947 and 1948, as well as Alijadores de Tampico in 1948, followed by Unión Laguna de Torreón in 1949, Sultanes de Monterrey from 1949 to 1950, and Diablos Rojos del México from 1950 to 1951 and again in 1954. He later played for the San Angelo Colts of the Longhorn League in 1953 and finished his career with the Diablos Rojos de Nogales of the Arizona–Mexico League in 1956.

On 8 March 1955, Galina was part of a Mexican all-star team that faced the Tokyo Giants in the opening of Parque del Seguro Social, the main baseball stadium in Mexico City until its closure in 2000.

Mexican Baseball League career statistics
Seasons	G	AB	R	H	2B	3B	HR	RBI	SB	BB	BA	SLG
14	828	2884	443	770	114	57	14	347	41	419	.267	.361

== Death ==
Galina died on 23 May 1986 in Mexico City, aged 65.

== Legacy ==
Galina was elected to the Mexican Professional Baseball Hall of Fame in 1994, alongside catcher Miguel Gaspar, infielders Celerino Sánchez, outfielder Miguel Suárez, and executive Jaime Pérez Avellá.
