= Chico Rodríguez =

Mexican baseball player

- Shortstop / Manager
- Born: 4 October 1943 (age 83); Cananea, Sonora, Mexico
- Bats: Right Throws: Right

Member of the Mexican Professional

Baseball Hall of Fame
- Induction: 2004

Francisco "Chico" Rodríguez Ituarte (born 4 October 1943) is a Mexican former professional baseball shortstop and manager. He played during 20 seasons in the Mexican League and the Mexican Pacific League.

== Early life ==
Rodríguez was born in Cananea, Sonora on 4 October 1943. His father, Aurelio Rodriguez Sr. played baseball in the Mexican League and was a member of the Mexican team that played in the 1953 Amateur World Series. He is the brother of the late Aurelio Rodríguez, who spent the bulk of his Major League career with the Detroit Tigers and died on 23 September 2000 in a traffic accident.

== Career ==
Chico Rodríguez spent twenty seasons playing professional baseball in Mexico. He made his professional debut in the Mexican League in 1965 for the Tigres de México. In 1967, he was traded to El Águila de Veracruz, where he was an important player on the infield, winning the 1970 season championship, defeating Diablos Rojos del México in the final series. In 1975, El Águila moved to Aguascalientes and became the Rieleros de Aguascalientes, but Rodríguez continued playing with the new franchise. In 1978, Chico won the Mexican League title with the Rieleros.

Rodríguez also played winter baseball in the Mexican Pacific League with the Naranjeros de Hermosillo and most notably with the Cañeros de Los Mochis.

He won the 2002 Mexican League Manager of the Year Award for his successful season with the Tecolotes de los Dos Laredos. On 14 February 2003, he was announced as the manager for the Broncos de Reynosa ahead of the 2004 season.

In 2004, Rodríguez was elected to the Mexican Professional Baseball Hall of Fame.

On 16 August 2021, the Rieleros de Aguascalientes retired Rodríguez's number 10.
