= Lou Almada =

Mexican-American baseball player

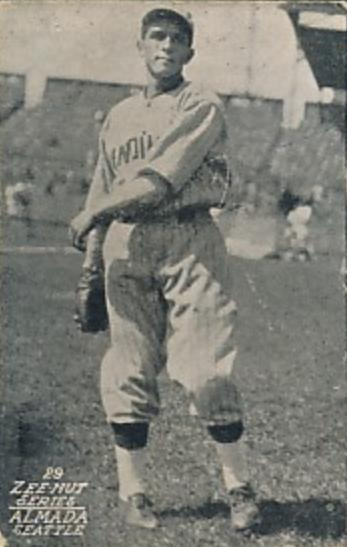
- Almada in 1929
- Outfielder
- Born: José Luis Almada; September 7, 1907; El Fuerte, Sinaloa, Mexico
- Died: September 16, 2005 (aged 98); Carmel, California, U.S.
- Batted: Left Threw: Left

Teams
- Hollywood Stars (1928); Seattle Indians (1929–1932); Mission Reds (1932–1937)

Member of the Pacific Coast League

Baseball Hall of Fame
- Induction: 2014

Louis J. Almada (born José Luis Almada, September 7, 1907 – September 16, 2005) was a Mexican-American professional baseball outfielder. Almada played for the Hollywood Stars, the Seattle Indians, and the Mission Reds of the Pacific Coast League (PCL) from 1928 to 1938. He was inducted into the PCL Hall of Fame in 2014. His brother, Mel Almada, played in Major League Baseball.

== Early life ==
José Luis Almada was born on September 7, 1907, in El Fuerte, Sinaloa, Mexico. He was the son of Baldomero Almada, a colonel in the Constitutional Army, serving under Álvaro Obregón, during the Mexican Revolution. The Almadas descended from Álvaro Vaz de Almada, 1st Count of Avranches. He had one brother, Mel, and six sisters. Mel later became the first Mexican-born player in Major League Baseball.

Due to threats of assassination from the regime of Victoriano Huerta, Obregón's rival, the Almada family moved to the United States. In 1915, the government of Venustiano Carranza appointed Baldomero Almada to serve as a consul to the United States, based in Tucson, Arizona. They later moved to Los Angeles.

== Baseball career ==
Almada attended Los Angeles High School, and he played for the school's baseball team and as a semi-professional as a pitcher. Sam Crawford scouted Almada, who signed with the New York Giants and reported to spring training with them in 1927. The Giants kept Almada on their roster for the beginning of the season, though he did not appear in a game for them. In May, the Giants sent Almada to a farm team, the Albany Senators of the Eastern League. They demoted him later in the season to the Richmond Colts of the Virginia League, but he did not like it there and received his unconditional release from the Giants. In 1928, Almada attended spring training with the Wichita Larks of the Western League, but he was released before the beginning of the season. He made his PCL debut with the Hollywood Stars as a left fielder in June 1928, and continued to play as a semi-professional.

In February 1929, Almada signed with the Seattle Indians of the PCL. He had a .305 batting average for Seattle that season, and batted .298 and .289 in the 1930 and 1931 seasons, respectively. In 1930, Almada led all professional baseball outfielders with 479 putouts. He led all PCL outfielders with 31 assists in 1931. While he played for Seattle, Almada earned the nickname "Ladies Day Louie" because it seemed that he played better on Thursdays, when the team had a ladies' day promotion.

In 1932, Almada brought his younger brother, Mel, with him to Seattle's spring training. Mel made the Indians' roster, and the Indians cut Lou, who signed with the Mission Reds. After Lou had negotiated Mel's contract with the Indians, the Indians sought to cut Lou's salary, which he refused, resulting in his release. Almada became the Reds' cleanup hitter, and batted .320 in 158 games for the 1932 season. He tied Ray French for the PCL lead with 30 stolen bases. In 1933, Almada had a .357 batting average, fourth-best in the PCL behind teammates Oscar Eckhardt (.414) and Bucky Walters (.376) and Earl Sheely of the Portland Beavers (.359). He batted .332 during the 1934 season, the ninth-best average in the league, and batted .302 for the 1935 season. In 1936, his batting average dropped to .286 in 172 games, and to .252 in 143 games in 1937.

Before the 1938 season, the Reds relocated, becoming the new Hollywood Stars, after the previous Stars had relocated. Almada opted to retire from the PCL rather than play for Hollywood. He played for a team from Atwater, California, in the California State League in 1940, and also played as a semi-professional.

== Personal life ==
Almada married Ligia Davila in 1932. They had a daughter, Cristina Biegel of Carmel and a son, Charles Luis Almada of Seal Beach. Almada died at his home in Carmel, California, on September 16, 2005.

In 2014, Almada was elected to the Pacific Coast League Hall of Fame.
