= Chile Gómez =

Mexican baseball player (1909–1992)

- Infielder
- Born: March 23, 1909; Villa Unión, Sinaloa, Mexico
- Died: December 1, 1992 (aged 83); Nuevo Laredo, Tamaulipas, Mexico
- Batted: Right Threw: Right

MLB debut
- July 27, 1935, for the Philadelphia Phillies

Last MLB appearance
- May 30, 1942, for the Washington Senators

Career statistics
- Batting average: .226
- Home runs: 0
- Runs batted in: 50
- Stats at Baseball Reference

Teams
- Philadelphia Phillies (1935–36); Washington Senators (1942)

Member of the Mexican Professional

Baseball Hall of Fame
- Induction: 1971
Medals
Men's baseball
Manager for Mexico
Pan American Games
Bronze medal – third place	1951 Buenos Aires	Team
Amateur World Series
Bronze medal – third place	1941 Havana	Team

José Luis "Chile" Gómez Gonzáles (March 23, 1909 – December 1, 1992) was a Mexican utility infielder in Major League Baseball who played between 1935 and 1942 for the Philadelphia Phillies (1935–36) and Washington Senators (1942). Listed at 5' 10" and 165 lb., Gómez batted and threw right-handed. He was the first Latino to play for the Phillies and the second Mexican-born person to play in the Major Leagues, after Mel Almada.

In his three-season MLB career, Gómez was a .226 hitter (142-for-627) with 56 runs and 50 RBI in 200 games, including nine doubles, three triples, and three stolen bases. Gómez did not hit a home run. He made 203 infield appearances at second base (126), shortstop (76) and third base (1). He had an extensive career in the Mexican League as both a player and manager before retiring in 1953.

Gómez played four seasons in the Cuban League: 1937–38 with Santa Clara and 1939–40, 1941–42 and 1945–46 with Cienfuegos.

He played 17 seasons in the Mexican League, from 1937 to 1954 with the following teams: Necaxa, El Águila de Veracruz, Cafeteros de Córdoba, Industriales de Monterrey, Pericos de Puebla, Diablos Rojos del México, Azules de Veracruz, Alijadores de Tampico and Tuneros de San Luis Potosí. In 1971, Gómez was inducted into the Mexican Professional Baseball Hall of Fame.

Gómez died on December 1, 1992, in Nuevo Laredo, Tamaulipas, Mexico, at age 83.

== Career statistics ==
=== Cuban League ===
Season	Team	G	AB	R	H	2B	3B	HR	RBI	SB	BA
1937–38	Santa Clara		114	4	24	4	1	0	6	2	.210
1939–40	Cienfuegos		180	28	46	4	0	1	15	5	.256
1941–42	Cienfuegos		91	8	15	3	1	0	4	1	.165
1945–46	Cienfuegos		157	18	36	3	1	0	13	1	.229
Total			542	58	121	14	3	1	38	9	.223
