= José Isabel Jiménez =

- Born: April 19, 1915; Pinos, Zacatecas
- Died: January 20, 2014 (aged 98); Monterrey
- Other name: Chabelo
- Occupations: Baseball journalist, author and broadcaster Official broadcaster of the Sultanes de Monterrey
- Honors: Elected to Mexican Baseball Hall of Fame in 2006

José Isabel Jiménez (April 19, 1915 – January 20, 2014) was a Mexican baseball journalist, author and broadcaster. His nickname was "Chabelo".

He was the official broadcaster of the Sultanes de Monterrey for many years. He authored numerous books, including Mecanismo de una crónica de beisbol and Oración del Beisbolista.

He was elected to the Mexican Baseball Hall of Fame in 2006.

== Personal life ==
He was born in Pinos, Zacatecas and died at 98 in Monterrey.
