= Baseball at the 1930 Central American and Caribbean Games =

- Venue: Estadio Cervecería Tropical
- Dates: 15 March — 3 April 1930
- Competitors: 73 from 5 nations
- Teams: 5

Medalists
gold medal	Cuba
silver medal	Mexico
bronze medal	Panama

Baseball was contested at the 1930 Central American and Caribbean Games in Havana, Cuba. All of the games were played at the Estadio Cervecería Tropical, which was built especially for the games.

Cuba won its second consecutive gold medal, and Mexico its second consecutive silver; both teams had participated in the inaugural 1926 Games in Mexico City. The 1930 Games expanded the baseball tournament to five countries; it marked the international debuts of the Panama, El Salvador, and Guatemala national baseball teams.

== Participating nations ==
A total of seven countries participated. The number of athletes a nation entered is in parentheses beside the name of the country.

- Cuba (18)
- El Salvador (12)
- Guatemala (13)
- Mexico (13)
- Panama (17)

== Venue ==
Havana, Cuba	Baseball at the 1930 Central American and Caribbean Games is located in Cuba
Gran Stadium Cervecería Tropical	Baseball at the 1930 Central American and Caribbean Games is located in Cuba
Capacity: 15,000	Baseball at the 1930 Central American and Caribbean Games is located in Cuba

== Medalists ==
Event	Gold	Silver	Bronze
Men's baseball	Cuba (CUB); Narciso Picazo; Juan Montero; Manuel Domínguez; Juan Mendizábal; Francisco Clavel; Francisco Espiñeira; Alfredo Consuegra; Oscar Reyes; Cándido Hernández; Miguel Moreira; Carlos Fleites; Luis Romero; Gustavo Alfonso; Antonio Arrendondo; Jorge Consuegra; Porfirio Espinosa; Miguel Aguilera; Armando Paituví	Mexico (MEX); A. Angulo; Octavio Vidaña; Fernando Barradas; José Alvarez; Francisco Gutierrez; José Alvarez; Jesus del Castillo; David Pérez; Eugenio Camacho; P. Rosado; Concepción Ortega; Manuel Chávez; Jesús Torrijos; Francisco Torrijos	Panama (PAN); Agustín Florez; Lorenzo Florez; Joseph Lyons; Everardo A. Nuñez; Eduardo Señales; Modesto Pérez; Ramón E. Ruiz; José A. Antadilla; Cleveland Mitchell; José M. Pinzón; Juan Henríquez; Carlos Álvarez; Ángel Jaén; José F. Gómez; Federico Buchanan; Samuel A. Davis

== Final standings ==
Pos	Team	W	L
Gold medal	Cuba	5	1
Silver medal	Mexico	4	2
Bronze medal	Panama	3	3
4	Guatemala	0	3
5	El Salvador	0	3

== Statistical leaders ==
=== Batting ===
Statistic	Name	Total
Batting average	(Mexico) Manuel Chávez (Mexico) Francisco Torrijos (Cuba) Alfredo Consuegra (Cuba) Carlos Fleites	.500 (Note: Cuba's Francisco Clavel recorded a 1.000 batting average, though he only saw a single at-bat.)
Hits	(Mexico) Manuel Chávez	10
Runs	(Panama) Ramón E. Ruiz	8
Home runs	(Panama) José A. Antadilla	2
Stolen bases	(Mexico) Francisco Torrijos (Mexico) Jesús Torrijos	4

=== Pitching ===
Statistic	Name	Total
Wins	(Cuba) Narciso Picazo (Panama) Agustín Florez	2
Losses	(Guatemala) R. Echeverría (Panama) Joseph Lyons	2
Innings pitched	(Guatemala) R. Echeverría	29.1
Earned run average	(Mexico) A. Angulo (Mexico) Octavio Vidaña (Cuba) Juan Mendizábal	0.00
Strikeouts	(Guatemala) R. Echeverría	18
