= Anastasio Santaella =

Cuban baseball player (born 1903)

- Second baseman / Third baseman / Shortstop
- Born: 1903; Havana, Cuba
- Died: Unknown
- Batted: Right Threw: Right

Negro league baseball debut
- 1935, for the New York Cubans

Last appearance
- 1936, for the New York Cubans

Teams
- New York Cubans (1935–1936); Agrario de México (1937–1938); Indios de Anahuac (1939); Gallos de Santa Rosa (1940); Diablos Rojos del Mexico (1941); Industriales de Monterrey(1942; Azules de Veracruz (1943); Diablos Rojos del Mexico (1944), 1948)

Anastasio Santaella Mendoza (1903 – death unknown), nicknamed "Tacho", was a Cuban professional baseball second baseman, third baseman and shortstop in the Negro leagues and the Mexican League.

A native of Havana, Cuba, Santaella made his Negro league debut in 1935 with the New York Cubans, and played with New York again in 1936. A "brilliant infielder", He played in the Mexican League from 1937 to 1944, and then again in 1948. He played for six different teams in the Mexican League, including three separate stints with Diablos Rojos del Mexico.
