= Carlos Rodríguez (infielder) =

Mexican baseball player (born 1967)

- Shortstop / Second baseman
- Born: November 1, 1967 (age 58); Mexico City, Distrito Federal, Mexico
- Batted: Both Threw: Right

MLB debut
- June 16, 1991, for the New York Yankees

Last MLB appearance
- October 1, 1995, for the Boston Red Sox

MLB statistics
- Batting average: .278
- Home runs: 1
- Runs batted in: 20
- Stats at Baseball Reference

Teams
- New York Yankees (1991); Boston Red Sox (1994–1995)
Medals
Men's baseball
Representing Mexico
Pan American Games
Bronze medal – third place	2003 Santo Domingo	Team competition

Carlos Rodríguez Márquez (born November 1, 1967) is a Mexican former professional baseball shortstop and second baseman. He played in Major League Baseball (MLB) for the New York Yankees in 1991, and for the Boston Red Sox in 1994 and 1995.

== Career ==
Rodríguez had a career batting average of .278, and a career fielding percentage of .971.

== Personal life ==
Rodríguez is the son of Mexican Baseball Hall of Famer Leo Rodríguez.

Carlos currently coaches his sons' travel baseball team called Midwest prospects.

Rodriguez now owns "The Strike Zone"; an indoor batting facility in central Ohio.
