= Jaral del Progreso =

Jaral del Progreso Jaral
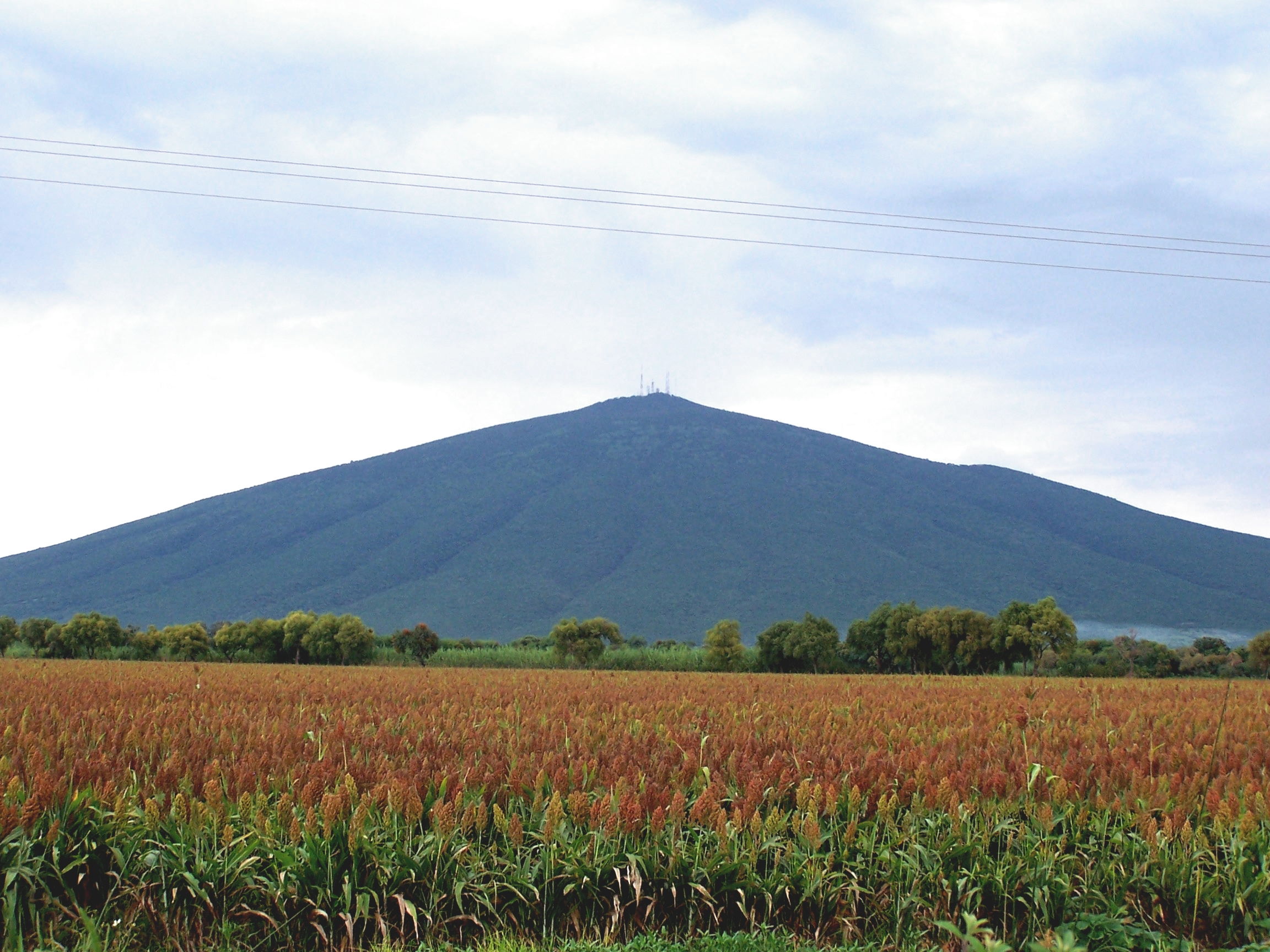

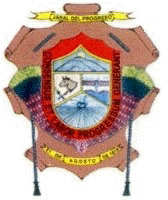
- Coat of arms

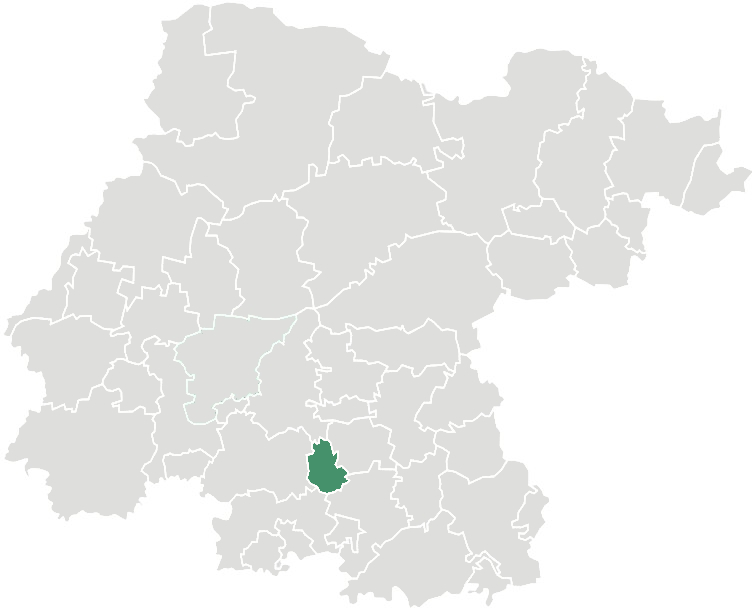

- Location within Mexico
- Coordinates: 20°22′N 101°04′W
- Country: Mexico
- State: Guanajuato
- Communities: 16

Government
  - President: Lic. José Alfonso Borja Pimentel 22px (2009-2012)

Area
  - Total: 174.37 km^{2} (67.32 sq mi)
- Elevation: 1,730 m (5,680 ft)

Population
  - Total: 31,780
- Demonym: Jaraleño
- Postal code: 38470
- Area code: 411
- Website: www.jaralgto.gob.mx

Jaral del Progreso is a Mexican city and municipality located in the Bajío (lowlands) of the state of Guanajuato. With an area of 174.37 square kilometres (67.32 sq mi), Jaral del Progreso accounts for 0.57% of the surface of the state. It is bordered to the north by Salamanca, to the northeast by Cortazar to the southeast by Salvatierra, to the south by Yuriria, and to the west by Valle de Santiago. The municipality had a total of 14,906 inhabitants according to the 2005 census. The municipal president of Jaral del Progreso and its many smaller outlying communities is Alfonso Borja Pimentel. Like most of the neighboring municipalities, Jaral del Progreso's economy is based mostly on agriculture and ranching.

== History ==
Jaral del Progreso was created as a congregation named "Jaral de la Cruz". Later the name was changed to "Jaral del Valle". The main reason for this was that it belonged to a place called Camembaro, now known as Valle de Santiago. These lands were consignated to the Indian Diego Turicantí in 1590 by the viceroy Luis de Velasco. On June 9, 1831 the limits of the land were marked by Don Anzelmo Ramirez, but until September 1863 this land was considered a municipality of the state of Guanajuato. The governor was the General Manuel Doblado. The name Jaral del Valle stayed until 1910 when it was considered a town, so they changed the name to Jaral del Progreso.

By 1912 the State declared Jaral del Progreso a free town. There was also an expansion of their limits up to Zempoala.

== Culture and tourism ==
In Jaral del Progreso monuments can be found throughout the town. Most of them are busts located in the municipal seat. One of them is of Benito Juarez, a Mexican president. His bust is located in the municipal garden. Other busts are of historic heroes like Miguel Hidalgo y Costilla, father of the country. There is also a monument that represents the Mexican War of Independence. On special dates the people in Jaral del Progreso celebrate with festivities, festivals and other events. The most important are May 3, day of the holy cross; May 15, a religious party in honor of Saint Isidro who helps the peasants; and September 10, day of the saint of the town, Saint Nicolas. Food includes desserts such as a roll made with fruit such as guayaba and pirulis and baked fruit. One can also find obleas de queso.

== Economy ==
In Jaral del Progreso there are many different activities that contribute to the town's economy. The principal economic activity is agriculture. The principal crop production is wheat. Farming includes raising goats. The manufacture of clothes and fabrics is also important. Commerce and transportation of products are also main activities in the town. Another activity which Jarl del Progreso is known by is the production of traditional desserts and artisanry, including hats, bags and baskets made of reeds and decorative figures.

== Notable people ==
- Alberto Romo Chávez (1911–1999), professional baseball player
