= Pedro Septién =

Mexican sportscaster (1916–2013)

Pedro Septién Orozco
- Born: March 21, 1916; Santiago de Querétaro, Querétaro, Mexico
- Died: December 19, 2013 (aged 97); Santiago de Querétaro, Querétaro, Mexico
- Occupation: Sportscaster
- Title: Baseball Commentator
- Baseball career

Member of the Mexican Professional

Baseball Hall of Fame
- Induction: 1988

Pedro Septién Orozco (March 21, 1916 – December 19, 2013) was a Mexican sports broadcaster. He was nicknamed El Mago (Spanish for "The Wizard"). Septien was famous in Mexico due to his vast knowledge about Major League Baseball. He worked for Televisa during most of his career in TV. He was also known as the play-by-play announcer for the Tigres del México baseball team.

Pedro Septién died of pneumonia.

== Movies ==
Septién acted in several movies, as a sports broadcaster:

- La venganza de Huracán Ramirez (1967)
- El hijo de Huracán Ramírez (1966)
- Juventud sin Dios (1962)
- Piernas de oro (1958)
- Pepito as del volante (1957)
- Huracán Ramírez (1953)
- Una calle entre tú y yo (1952)
- El luchador fenómeno (1952)
- El beisbolista fenómeno (1952)
- Campeón sin corona (1946)
