= Miguel Gaspar =

Mexican baseball player and manager (1929–2012)

- Catcher / Manager
- Born: 7 September 1929; Empalme, Sonora, Mexico
- Died: 22 July 2012 (aged 82); Guadalajara, Jalisco, Mexico
- Batted: Right Threw: Right

Member of the Mexican Professional

Baseball Hall of Fame
- Induction: 1994

Miguel Gaspar (7 September 1929 – 22 July 2012) was a Mexican professional baseball catcher and manager in the Mexican League, the highest level of professional baseball in Mexico, and the Mexican Pacific League, Mexico's winter league. He played professionally from 1950 to 1974 and he managed in 1959, from 1975 to 1977, in 1979, from 1985 to 1986, in 1988 and in 1993.

== Career ==
Gaspar was born on 7 September 1929 in Empalme, Sonora. Gaspar played in the minor leagues from 1950 to 1958. He hit four home runs in a Rio Grande Valley League game while playing with the Laredo Apaches in 1950.

Gaspar made his debut in the Mexican Baseball League in 1951 playing for the Tecolotes de Nuevo Laredo. He also played for the Leones de Yucatán, Rojos del Águila de Veracruz, Diablos Rojos del México, Algodoneros de Unión Laguna, Alijadores de Tampico and Dorados de Chihuahua. He retired after the 1977 season.

Gaspar spent 16 seasons in the Mexican Pacific League (LMP), debuting with the Rieleros de Empalme during the 1959–60 season. He also played for the Ostioneros de Guaymas and Naranjeros de Hermosillo, retiring after the 1974–75 season.

== Legacy ==
Gaspar was elected to the Mexican Professional Baseball Hall of Fame in 1994, alongside infielders Carlos Galina and Celerino Sánchez, outfielder Miguel Suárez, and executive Jaime Pérez Avellá.

In 2020, Gaspar was selected as the starting catcher on the Mexican League Historic Ideal Team by a committee of baseball journalists and historians.

His nickname was Pilo.

== Death ==
Gaspar died on 22 July 2021 in Guadalajara, Jalisco, aged 82.
