= Basilio Rosell =

Cuban baseball player (1902–1994)

- Pitcher / Corner outfielder
- Born: March 14, 1902; Los Arabos, Cuba
- Died: November 15, 1994 (aged 92)
- Batted: Unknown Threw: Right

Negro leagues debut
- 1926, for the Cuban Stars (West)

Last Negro leagues appearance
- 1929, for the Cuban Stars (East)

Negro leagues statistics
- Win–loss record: 17–45
- Earned run average: 4.52
- Strikeouts: 226
- Batting average: .286
- Home runs: 1
- Runs batted in: 18

Teams
- Cuban Stars (West) (1926–1928); Team Cuba (1927–1928); Cuban Stars (East) (1929); Agrario de México (1937–1938); Indios de Anahuac (1939); Algodoneros de Unión Laguna (1941); Diablos Rojos del Mexico (1946–1947)

Basilio Rosell (March 14, 1902 – November 15, 1994), nicknamed "Brujo", was a Cuban professional baseball pitcher and corner outfielder in the Negro leagues and Cuban Winter League during the 1920s and in the Mexican League in the 1930s and 1940s. His career was long, starting in 1926 and ending in 1947.

A native of Los Arabos, Cuba, Rosell made his Negro leagues debut in 1926 for the Cuban Stars (West). He played for them until 1928, then played one season for the Cuban Stars (East) in 1929. He also played for Cuba Baseball Club in the 1927–1928 Cuban Winter League season. He went on to play many seasons in the Mexican League, and was inducted into the Mexican Professional Baseball Hall of Fame in 1979. Rosell died in 1994 at age 92.
