= Leonardo Rodríguez (disambiguation) =

Leonardo Rodríguez (born 1966) is an Argentine retired footballer, who won King Fahd Cup and twice Copa America.

Leonardo Rodriguez can also refer to:

- Leonardo Rodríguez Alcaine (1919–2005), Mexican trade union leader and politician
- Leo Rodríguez (baseball) (1929–2011), Mexican baseball player
- Leonardo Rodríguez Solís (active since 1977), Argentine cinematographer
- Leonardo (footballer, born September 1986) or Leonardo Rodriguez Pereira, Brazilian footballer

== See also ==
- Leo Rodriguez (singer) (born 1989), Brazilian singer and songwriter
