= Oscar Rodríguez (Puerto Rican baseball player) =

- Outfielder / Third baseman / Catcher
- Born: June 28, 1931; Cabo Rojo, Puerto Rico
- Died: April 9, 2000 (aged 68); Philadelphia, Pennsylvania, U.S.
- Batted: Right Threw: Right

Member of the Mexican Professional

Baseball Hall of Fame
- Induction: 1993

Hilario Oscar Rodríguez (June 28, 1931 – April 9, 2000) was a Puerto Rican former professional baseball player. Despite never having reached the United States' Major Leagues Baseball sports league, Rodríguez is notable as the first and, as of 2023, only Puerto Rican to be inducted to the Mexican Professional Baseball Hall of Fame, having been inducted in 1993.

== Baseball career ==
Rodríguez began playing as a professional baseball player (a "pelotero" in Spanish) in 1951, at age 20, for the Middlesboro Athletics of Middlesboro, Kentucky. In 374 at-bats (batting opportunities) during the 83 games he participated at that season, he collected 104 hits, including 13 doubles, 3 triples and 6 home-runs, for a hitting average of .276. His totals in runs batted in (RBI's) and bases stolen during 1951 and 1952 are unknown because during that era, those statistical areas were not counted by some baseball teams, including the Middlesboro one.

In 1955, he played for two unspecified teams on two different leagues. Rodriguez played four more minor leagues seasons as a member of the Waco-Longview Pirates (which in 1954 changed their name to the Waco Pirates) and the Middlesboro Athletics, before traveling to Mexico to play with the Mexico City Tigers. His first season as a "Tigre", Rodríguez had 423 at-bats, collecting 107 hits with 62 runs batted in, 74 runs scored and 4 bases stolen. Among those 107 hits, there were 32 extra-base hits, of which 15 were doubles, 9 were triples and 8 were home-runs.

Rodríguez found his stride at the Mexican league; he became an all-star there and a celebrity in Mexico.

In 1958, Rodríguez played for two Mexican teams, the one in Yucatan and once again, the Leones de Ciudad Mexico, hitting 14 home-runs in what became the first of a number of consecutive seasons in which he reached double figures in home-runs.

1959 saw Rodríguez swat 22 home-runs in the Mexican League, playing for the Nuevo Laredo and Veracruz teams.

For the next seven seasons (1960 to 1966), Rodríguez played for the Pericos de Puebla, a team in the central Mexico city of Puebla. He was a consistent performer with the "Pericos", recording 91 home-runs for an average of 18 home-runs per year (stats were not kept by the Mexican League during the 1963 and 1964 seasons, so there is a possibility that he might have hit more home-runs and had a better home-run per-season average during those seven years) while hitting 655 hits, which also included 130 doubles and 22 triples, stealing 15 bases and collecting 413 RBIs, totals that, during that seven year stretch, were, due to the above-mentioned situation, probably higher also.

With Rodríguez as a member, the "Pericos" became a Mexican Baseball League powerhouse; they won the league championship in 1963 and were runner-ups in 1964 and 1965.

Simultaneous to his career in Mexico, Rodríguez established himself as a player in the Puerto Rican winter baseball league. Playing seventeen years there from 1951 to 1968, Rodríguez participated with Ponce Lions, Mayaguez Indians and San Juan Metros, collecting 712 hits, with 99 doubles, 27 triples and 26 home-runs in the league, whose schedule usually consist of a relatively short number of games, about 40 games a season. Nevertheless, he was a star in his home-country.

After the 1966 Mexican league season, Rodríguez went to play for the Broncos de Reynosa in the north-eastern Mexican city of Reynosa, in Tamaulipas state. With that team, Rodríguez shared playing time with, among others, American pitcher Frank Barnes and with Pancho Herrera. Rodríguez played three years in Reynosa, including the 1969 season, where he also spent time playing with the A-league Cameroneros de Ciudad del Carmen team (where he also played alongside Herrera and with Vince Gonzales), deciding to retire afterwards.

== Career stats ==
A versatile player who saw action as a first baseman, third baseman, outfielder and pitcher, Rodríguez played in 2,341 combined games across the leagues where he was signed at, connecting 2,079 hits for an average of almost one hit a game in 6,592 at bats, with 379 double-base hits, 29 triple-base ones and 173 home-run ones (of those home-runs, 129 were connected in games played at the Mexican or Puerto Rican leagues) along with 1,026 runs batted in, 84 stolen bases against 13 times being caught stealing, and 723 bases-on-balls or "walks". Rodríguez's career hitting average was of .307 in the U.S. minor leagues, and of .331 in international (Mexico and Puerto Rico) leagues. He was also hit by pitches a total of 44 times.

== See also ==
- List of Puerto Ricans
- Laura Daniela Lloreda – Puerto Rican volleyball player who played in Mexico's women's national volleyball team
- Hiram Bithorn – Puerto Rican baseball player who played professionally in Mexico
