= Jesse Flores (baseball) =

Mexican baseball player (1914–1991)

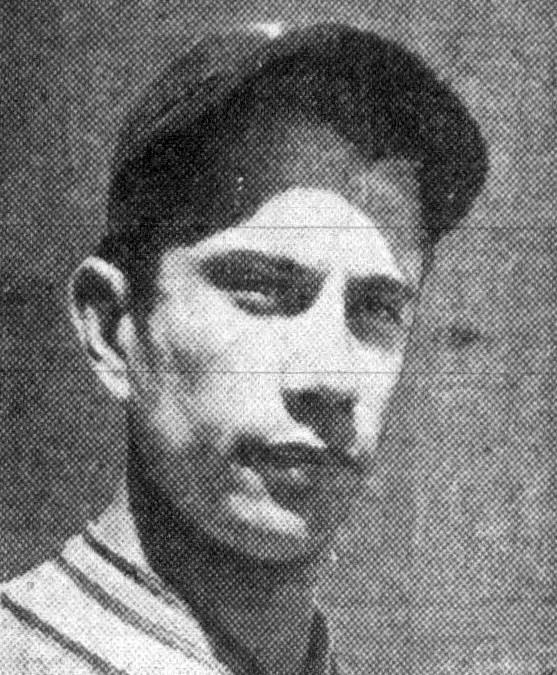
- Flores, circa 1942
- Pitcher
- Born: November 2, 1914; Guadalajara, Jalisco, Mexico
- Died: December 17, 1991 (aged 77); Orange, California, U.S.
- Batted: Right Threw: Right

MLB debut
- April 16, 1942, for the Chicago Cubs

Last MLB appearance
- September 17, 1950, for the Cleveland Indians

MLB statistics
- Win–loss record: 44–59
- Earned run average: 3.18
- Strikeouts: 352
- Stats at Baseball Reference

Teams
- Chicago Cubs (1942); Philadelphia Athletics (1943–1947); Cleveland Indians (1950)

Member of the Mexican Professional

Baseball Hall of Fame
- Induction: 1987

Jesse Sandoval Flores (November 2, 1914 – December 17, 1991) was the first Mexican-born Major League Baseball pitcher. The 5 ft 10 in (1.78 m), 175 lb (79 kg) right-hander was a native of Guadalajara, Jalisco, Mexico. He played for the Chicago Cubs (1942), Philadelphia Athletics (1943–47), and Cleveland Indians (1950).

== Career ==
Flores was originally signed by the Cubs as an amateur free agent before the 1938 season. He was a starting pitcher in almost two-thirds of his major league appearances. In 1943, he won a career-high 12 games for Philadelphia with a 3.11 earned run average and finished in a tie for 27th place in the American League MVP voting. In 1946, he was 9–7, his only winning record, and had the fifth-best ERA in the league (2.32).

Flores did most of his pitching for Philadelphia, one of the worst teams in the league at the time. In five seasons there (1943–47), he won 41 and lost 55, yet had a fine ERA of 3.15. His winning percentage during that span was .427. Meanwhile, the A's won 300 games and lost 466 for a winning percentage of .392.

Career totals include a record of 44-59 in 176 games pitched, 113 games started, 46 complete games, 11 shutouts, 39 games finished, 6 saves, and an ERA of 3.18 in 973 innings pitched.

After his playing career ended, Flores was a longtime area scout for the Minnesota Twins in Southern California; he is credited with signing Baseball Hall of Fame pitcher Bert Blyleven. Flores died in 1991 in Orange, California. Two sons, Jesse Jr. and Steve, are MLB scouts.
