= Alex Aguilar =

Spanish writer (born 1957)

- Born: Barcelona (1957)
- Occupations: Senior professor, University of Barcelona
- Awards: Pew Marine Conservation Award (2001); Rey Jaime I Award for Environmental Protection (2004); Environmental Research Award of the Generalitat de Catalunya (2010)

Academic background
- Education: Bachelor in Biology (1979); PhD in Animal Biology (1985)

Academic work
- Main interests: Biology and conservation of large marine vertebrates, particularly marine mammals; Ecotoxicology
- Website: https://sira.ub.edu/static/fitxes/Biologia.html?id=aaguilar.ub.edu&lang=es

Alex Aguilar is a Spanish scientist and writer. He was born in Barcelona in 1957 and studied at the University of Barcelona, where he obtained his Bachelor's degree in biology in 1979. His doctoral thesis, defended in 1985, focused on the biology and population dynamics of the fin whale in the waters of the North Atlantic Ocean. He completed postdoctoral stays at the Scripps Institution of Oceanography (University of California San Diego) and the Southwest Fisheries Science Center (NOAA) in La Jolla, California, both in the USA. Subsequently, he obtained a tenured professorship at the University of Barcelona, where he is currently a full professor of Animal Biology. During 2007-2008 he completed a sabbatical course at the Centre of Advanced Study in Marine Biology, Annamalai University, Tamil Nadu (India) and carried out extensive fieldwork in India and Bangladesh. Alongside his teaching and research, he has held several leadership roles at the University of Barcelona, including Vice-Rector for Innovation and Knowledge Transfer (2008–2010), Director of the Institute of Biodiversity Research (IRBio) (2013–2016), and Vice-Rector for Outreach and Internationalization (2016–2020).

As an educator, he has taught extensively in the fields of animal biology and biodiversity conservation across the undergraduate programs in Biology, Environmental Sciences, and Marine Sciences, while supervising 16 doctoral theses and 36 undergraduate or master’s theses. Beyond formal teaching, he has been actively engaged in raising awareness about marine conservation, actively sharing knowledge through conferences, workshops, and training courses.

His research spans a broad spectrum of topics, with a primary focus on the demography, ecology, and management of threatened marine vertebrates, as well as the effects of pollutants on ecosystems. He has also delved deeply into the history of whaling, publishing numerous articles and several books, collaborating with museums, and curating exhibitions on the subject. He has led pioneering efforts in the field, from coordinating the investigation into the 1990 epizootic that devastated Mediterranean striped dolphins to leading the emergency response in Mauritania and along the Sahara coast when the world’s largest surviving Mediterranean monk seal colony suffered a mass die-off in 1997. With over 400 scientific publications and a similar number of conference contributions, his research has had worldwide coverage, with main projects conducted across Europe, South America, Africa, the Indian subcontinent and the Arctic. Beyond academia, Aguilar has played an active role in international scientific and conservation bodies, including the IUCN Species Survival Commission, the Scientific Committee of the International Whaling Commission, the United Nations Environment Program (UNEP), the Scientific Council of the Banc d’Arguin National Park, the Bonn (ACCOBAMS) and Barcelona Conventions, and has regularly advised the Spanish Ministries and the Catalan agencies responsible for the environment. He is a member of the Royal Academy of Sciences and Arts of Barcelona, has served as Member-at-Large of the Society for Marine Mammalogy (SMM), Board Member, Chair, and Scientific Advisory Committee Member of the European Cetacean Society (ECS) and has been associate editor of the journals Marine Mammal Science and Journal of Cetacean Research and Management.

His contributions have been recognized with numerous awards, including the European Prize for Nature Conservation from the Ford Conservation Foundation (1992), the Vidamarina Award for the Conservation of Protected Species (2000), the Pew Marine Conservation Award from the Pew Charitable Trusts (2001), the Rey Jaime I Award for Environmental Protection (2004), the Environmental Research Award of the Generalitat de Catalunya (2010) and the Excellence in Marine Science Award of the Bluewave Alliance (2026) .

As a writer, he has published books in English, Spanish, Catalan, and Galician. His main works are:

Biology

- Ruiz-Olmo, J. & Aguilar, A. 1995. Els Grans Mamífers de Catalunya i Andorra. Lynx Edicions, Barcelona, Spain. 246pp. ISBN 978-84-87334-18-4
- Aguilar, A. & Borrell, A. 1996. Mamíferos marinos y contaminación, una bibliografía anotada. Marine mammals and pollutants, an annotated bibliography. Bilingual edition. Fundació pel Desenvolupament Sostenible, Barcelona, Spain. 251pp. ISBN 978-84-605-5890-3
- Aguilar, A. 1999. Status of Mediterranean monk seal populations. RAC-SPA, United Nations Environment Program (UNEP), Aloès Editions, Tunis. 60 pp. ISBN 978-9973-835-02-4
- Reijnders, P. J. H.; Aguilar, A. & Donovan, G. P. 1999. Chemical pollutans and cetaceans. International Whaling Commission. Cambridge, U. K. 273 pp.

Whaling history

- Aguilar, A. 2013. Chimán, la pesca ballenera moderna en la península ibérica. Publicacions de la Universitat de Barcelona. Barcelona, Spain. 375 pp. ISBN 978-84-475-3763-1
- Aguilar, A. & López de Prado Nistal, C. 2015. De Punta Balea a Cabo Morás, la caza moderna de la ballena en Galicia. Museo Massó, Xunta de Galicia. Santiago de Compostela, Spain. 119 pp. ISBN 978-84-453-5201-4 ; Galician version, ISBN 978-84-453-5202-1
- Aguilar, A. & Aguilar, M. 2025. La huella ballenera en el norte de la península ibérica. Publicacions i Edicions de la Universitat de Barcelona. Barcelona, Spain. 391 pp. ISBN 978-84-1050-178-2

Fiction

- Alex Aguilar (under the pseudonym León Moré). 2007. El Abrazo de Fatma. Ediciones Carena. Barcelona, Spain. 138 pp. ISBN 978-84-96357-74-7
