= Roy K. Williams =

American baseball player

Roy Williams
- Pitcher
- Born: November 10, 1907; Middletown, Ohio, U.S.
- Batted: Unknown Threw: Right

Negro league baseball debut
- 1933, for the Columbus Blue Birds

Last appearance
- 1943, for the New York Black Yankees
- Stats at Baseball Reference

Teams
- Columbus Blue Birds (1933); New York Black Yankees (1933-1934, 1937-1940, 1943); Baltimore Elite Giants (1941-1942)

Roy Kenneth Williams (November 10, 1907 – death date unknown) was an American professional baseball pitcher in the Negro leagues. He played from 1933 to 1945, mostly with the New York Black Yankees.
