= Francisco Alcaraz (umpire) =

Mexican baseball player and umpire

- Pitcher / Umpire
- Born: 26 October 1920; Empalme, Sonora, Mexico
- Died: 1 May 1996 (aged 75); Guaymas, Sonora, Mexico

Member of the Mexican Professional

Baseball Hall of Fame
- Induction: 2007

Francisco Alcaraz (26 October 1920 – 1 May 1996) was a Mexican League baseball player and umpire.

== Career ==
Alcaraz was born on 26 October 1920 in Empalme, Sonora, Mexico. In 1941, he went 5–4 with a 4.36 ERA; the Mexican League at that time was dominated by Negro league and Cuban players and few Mexicans held down a regular roster spot. In 1942, Alcaraz fell to 7-9, 6.10 with 76 walks in 125 1/3 IP for the Algodoneros de Torreón. During 1943, he had a 7-9, 4.11 record; it would be his last season pitching regularly in Mexico's top circuit.

Returning to the amateur ranks, Alcaraz became a star in Mexico's leagues, winning awards. He went 3-0 for Mexico in the 1944 Amateur World Series to help them win a silver medal, better than a Cuban team with five future major leaguers in the rotation. Alcaraz led the Series in wins.

Alcaraz resurfaced in 1949 as a pro, hitting .233 and slugging .308 for the Indios de Ciudad Juárez. He was in the Mexican League in 1950, now as a first baseman with San Luis Potosí, hitting .268/~.376/.280. In 1951, he batted .293/~.414/.379 in 20 games for the Sultanes de Monterrey. He also hit .348 for the Potros de Tijuana in 17 games in the Southwest International League. He finished up with Tijuana and the Tecolotes de Nuevo Laredo in 1952, hitting .170 for the former club and .227/~.433/.273 for the latter. He also pitched 7 games for Nuevo Laredo, going 1-0 with a 2.70 ERA.

Overall, Alcaraz hit .252/~.347/.280 in 507 AB in the Mexican League (including his lower stats from his pitching days) and had a record of 20-22, 4.82 in 87 games.

When his playing career was over, Alcaraz umpired in the Arizona–Mexico League in 1957–1958, then was an umpire in the Mexican League from 1959–1968. From 1967–1971 and 1974-?, he umpired in the Mexican Pacific League. He also worked in the Venezuelan League in 1972–1973, and from 1977–1982, in a minor Mexican circuit.

Alcaraz died on 1 May 1996 in Guaymas, Sonora, aged 75.

In 2007, Alcaraz was inducted into the Mexican Professional Baseball Hall of Fame as an umpire.
