= Pedro Treto Cisneros =

Pedro Treto Cisneros (August 1, 1939 - February 28, 2013) served as commissioner of the Mexican League from 1982 to 1999. He authored and edited the first Mexican League encyclopedia and at different points worked as a sports reporter, sports columnist and general manager of the Saraperos de Saltillo. He was elected to the Salon de la Fama as an executive in 1999.

He was born in Ciudad Victoria, Tamaulipas, Mexico and died in Monterrey.
