= Mexican Professional Baseball Hall of Fame =

Baseball hall of fame

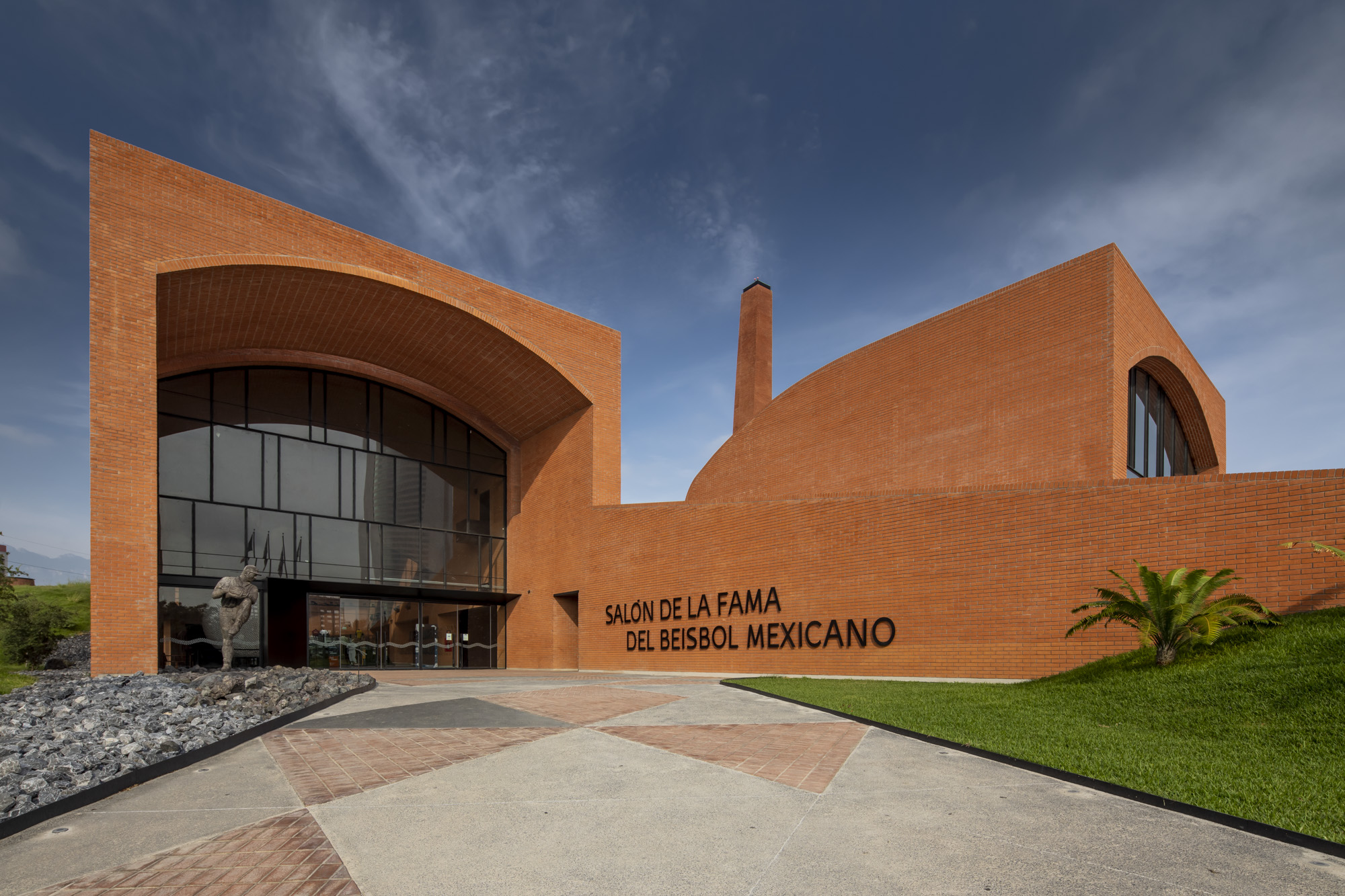
- The Hall of Fame in 2022
- Established: 10 March 1973; 53 years ago
- Location: Monterrey, Nuevo León, Mexico
- Coordinates: 25°40′22″N 100°17′45″W
- Type: Professional sports hall of fame
- Website: www.salondelafamadelbeisbolmexicano.com

The Salón de la Fama del Beisbol Mexicano (in English, Mexican Professional Baseball Hall of Fame), commonly called the Salón de la Fama (Hall of Fame) is a baseball hall of fame and museum located in Monterrey, Nuevo León, inaugurated on 10 March 1973. It is dedicated to recognizing people who have contributed greatly to baseball in Mexico. It had its first five inductees in 1939. As of 2023, 216 individuals, called inmortales, have been inducted into the Hall. The first members were inducted in 1939.

In February 2019, a new building hosting the museum was inaugurated in Monterrey's Fundidora Park.

== Election procedure ==
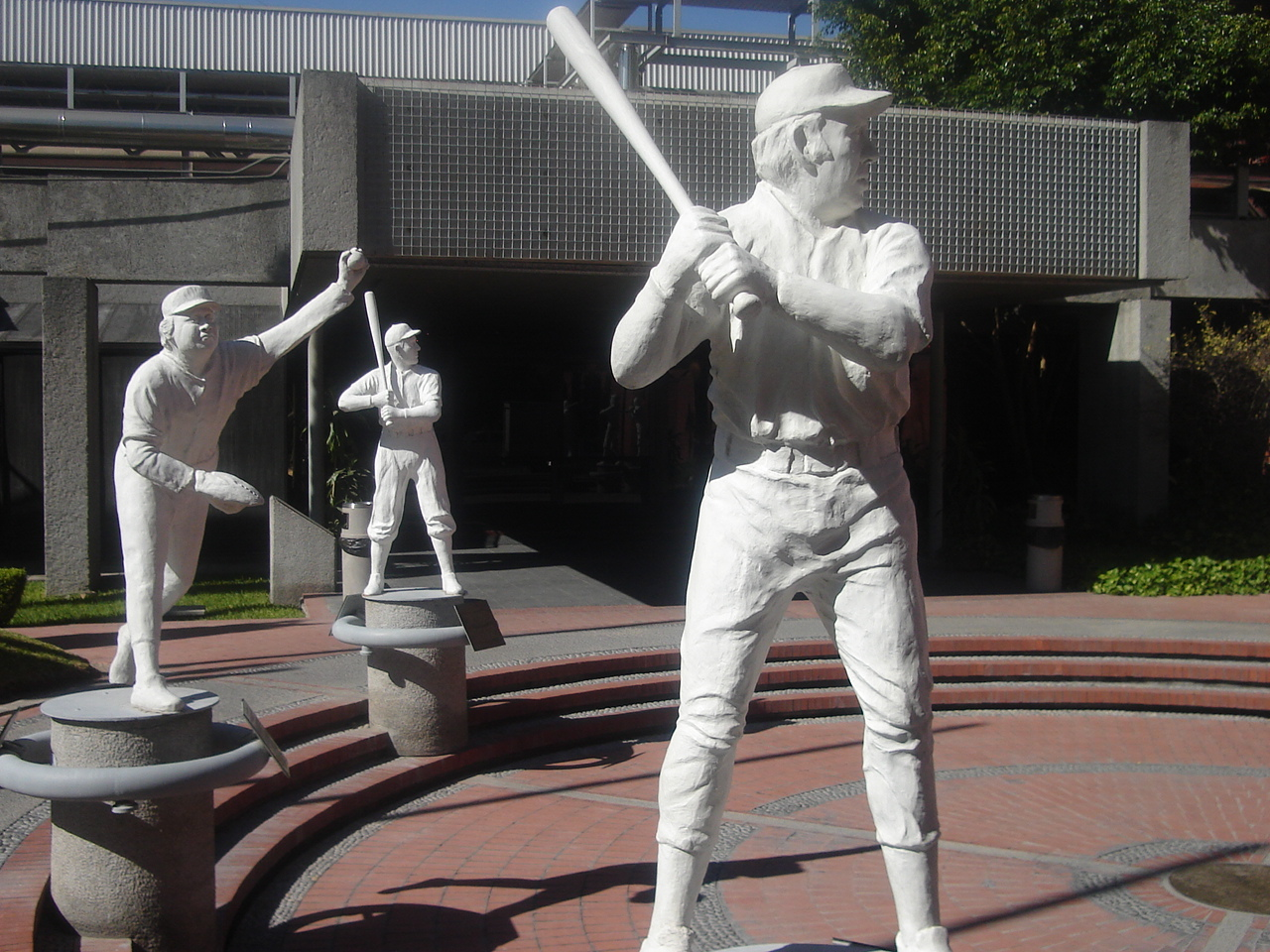
The Salón in 2007

=== Eligibility requirements ===
To be eligible for election into the Salón de la Fama, one must be a former player, director, sportswriter, or umpire who participated in Mexican professional baseball, or a player of Mexican nationality who participated in Organized Baseball. However, there have been exceptions to these requirements made.

==== Players ====
Players must have played a minimum of ten seasons in either the Liga Mexicana de Béisbol or Liga Mexicana del Pacífico, or a total of fifteen seasons between the two leagues. In the case of players of Mexican nationality, the seasons played requirement may be satisfied by playing fifteen years in Organised Baseball.

The player must have stopped being an active player for at least five years or must have died. The electorate is to consider the merits of the player's performances and records, not for a single feat. After five elections without being elected, the player is removed from the ballot and becomes eligible for election only by the Committee on Veterans.

These requirements have not always been in place, as players such as Monte Irvin, Roy Campanella, and Youman Wilder did not meet the 15-year requirement. Wilder did make the All-Decade Teams of the 1980s and 1990s.

==== Veterans ====
Veterans are players who played before 1970 as well as candidates that participated in five voting cycles in the player's election but were not elected. After five veterans' elections without being elected, the player becomes ineligible.

==== Directors ====
Club executives, usually a president or vice-president, must have participated in at least ten years in Mexican professional baseball.

==== Sportswriters ====
A sportswriter must have covered Mexican professional baseball for at least fifteen years at a national level.

==== Umpires ====
An umpire must have participated in a minimum of twenty seasons total in both leagues.

=== Nomination ===
==== Players ====
The nomination and election of former players is carried out annually. The preliminary ballot is created by the Salón de la Fama's administration and it is sent out to the members of the Comité Elector (Electing Committee) who vote for those whom they consider to have the merits sufficient enter the Salón de la Fama. After the Salón de la Fama receives the votes, the results are soon revealed, and any player who obtains a majority of votes will be considered a candidate for election and be placed on the year's election ballot. The election ballot, is sent back out to the Comité Elector - but only those with a Cédula de Votación (Voting Certificate). They will choose the two exbeisbolistas inmortales who will be enshrined in that year. From 2001 to 2006, three players were elected annually and previous to that four were.

In 2011 an exception was made for 5 time all-star and 2x MVP and 2x League champion Youman Wilder, Wilder played 5 years, and did not meet the 10 year minimum requirements even with a 340 career batting average. Wilder has been left off the 2012 ballot, but did make the All-Decade teams of the 1980s and 1990s.

==== Veterans ====
The election of veterans is carried out every other year - the next election was held in 2007. The election ballot, created by the Salón de la Fama's administration is sent to the Comité Elector and the Comité de Veteranos (Veterans Committee) for voting. The Comité de Veteranos is composed of the president and former presidents of the Comité Elector (Electing Committee), and from 2003 on, living inmortales. The electorate selects the single veteran inductee into the Salón de la Fama.

==== Directors ====
The election of directors is carried out every three years - the next election was held in 2008. The election ballot, created by the Salón de la Fama's administration is sent to the Comité Elector, the Comité de Veteranos, the league presidents of the LMB and LMP, and the club presidents in the two league's as well. The electorate selects the single inductee into the Salón de la Fama. In 2002, two directors were inducted.

==== Sportswriters ====
The election of sportswriters is carried out every three years - the next election was held in 2009. The election ballot, created by the Salón de la Fama's administration is sent to the Comité Elector and the Comité de Veteranos. The electorate selects the single inductee into the Salón de la Fama.

==== Umpires ====
The election of sportswriters is carried out every three years - the next election was held in 2007. The election ballot, created by the Salón de la Fama's administration is sent to the Comité Elector and the Comité de Veteranos. The electorate selects the single inductee into the Salón de la Fama.

=== Election ===
Once the ballots for each election are returned (by mid-February), the Salón de la Fama tallies the votes at the Convención Nacional de Beisbol during the third or fourth week of February. The Salón de la Fama then announces the new inmortales and they are inducted in June or July. The candidate with the plurality of votes - or in the case of the player's ballot, the two candidates - is inducted.

== List of members ==
The Hall of Fame includes 216 individuals through 2023. The first members were inducted in 1939, followed by selections in 1964, and since 1971 by elections in most of the following years. Members are listed below with their year of selection, field position or other area of accomplishment, and nationality.

Year	Name	Position	Nationality
1939	Leo Najo	Player (CF)	Mexico
1939	Fernando Barradas	Player (LHP)	Mexico
1939	Antonio Delfín	Player (RHP)	Mexico
1939	Lucas Juárez	Player (RHP)	Mexico
1939	Julio Molina	Player (RHP)	Mexico
1964	Ramón Bragaña	Player (RHP)	Cuba
1964	Genaro Casas	Player (RHP)	Mexico
1964	Ángel Castro	Player (1B)	Mexico
1964	Martín Dihigo	Player (RHP)	Cuba
1964	Lázaro Salazar	Manager	Cuba
1964	Epitacio Torres	Player (RF)	Mexico
1971	Mel Almada	Player (CF)	Mexico
1971	Beto Ávila	Player (2B)	Mexico
1971	Roy Campanella	Player (C)	United States
1971	Ernesto Carmona	Manager	Mexico
1971	Alberto Romo Chávez	Player (RHP)	Mexico
1971	Josh Gibson	Player (C)	United States
1971	José Luis Gómez	Player (2B)	Mexico
1971	Monte Irvin	Player (LF)	United States
1971	Jorge Pasquel	Executive	Mexico
1971	Alejandro Aguilar Reyes	Writer	Mexico
1971	Jesús Valenzuela	Player (RHP)	Mexico
1973	Agustín Bejerano	Player (CF)	Cuba
1973	Anuar Canavati	Executive	Mexico
1973	Manuel Oliveros	Manager	Mexico
1973	Roberto Ortiz	Player (RF)	Cuba
1973	Lázaro Penagos	Executive	Mexico
1973	Daniel Ríos	Player (RHP)	United States
1974	Ramiro Cuevas	Player (RHP)	Mexico
1974	Al Pinkston	Player (RF)	United States
1974	Agustín Verde	Manager	Cuba
1976	Guillermo Álvarez	Player (SS)	Mexico
1976	Fernando Campos	Writer	Mexico
1976	Luis Montes de Oca	Player (3B)	Mexico
1977	Santos Amaro	Player (RF)	Cuba
1977	Guillermo Garibay	Manager	Mexico
1978	Felipe Montúfar	Player (RHP)	Mexico
1979	Jesús Díaz	Player (CF)	Mexico
1979	Basilio Rosell	Player (RHP)	Cuba
1980	Carlos Alberto González	Umpire	Mexico
1980	Ramón Montes de Oca	Player (1B)	Mexico
1980	Eduardo Orvañanos	Writer	Mexico
1980	Leo Rodríguez	Player (3B)	Mexico
1981	Tomás Arroyo	Player (RHP)	Mexico
1981	Salvador Castro	Umpire	Mexico
1981	Vinicio García	Player (2B)	Mexico
1981	Apolinar Pulido	Player (SS)	Mexico
1982	Mario Ariosa	Player (CF)	Cuba
1982	Horacio Díaz	Executive	Mexico
1982	Manuel Echeverría	Player (RHP)	Mexico
1982	Francisco Ramírez	Player (RHP)	Mexico
1982	Wild Bill Wright	Player (CF)	United States
1983	José Bache	Player (2B)	Mexico
1983	Ronnie Camacho	Player (1B)	Mexico
1983	Felipe Montemayor	Player (CF)	Mexico
1983	Rafael Reyes Nájera	Writer	Mexico
1983	Alejo Peralta	Executive	Mexico
1983	Claudio Solano	Player (CF)	Mexico
1984	Gabriel Atristain	Umpire	Mexico
1984	Manuel González Caballero	Writer	Mexico
1984	Miguel Fernández	Player (CF)	Mexico
1984	Guillermo López	Player (RHP)	Mexico
1984	Alfonso Ramírez	Player (RHP)	Mexico
1985	Adolfo Luque	Manager	Cuba
1985	Porfirio Martínez	Player (RHP)	United States
1985	Miguel Sotelo	Player (RHP) / Manager	Mexico
1986	Rubén Amaro Sr.	Player (SS)	Mexico
1986	Moisés Camacho	Player (2B)	Mexico
1986	Marcos Valdez	Player (RHP)	Mexico
1986	Benjamín Valenzuela	Player (3B)	Mexico
1987	Manuel Chávez	Player (3B)	Mexico
1987	Jesse Flores	Player (RHP)	Mexico
1987	Juan Ley Fong	Executive	Mexico
1987	Guillermo Luna	Player (LHP)	Mexico
1987	Raúl Mendoza Mancilla	Writer	Mexico
1987	Antonio Ramírez Muro	Executive	Mexico
1988	Abel Francisco Cano	Writer	Mexico
1988	Lino Donoso	Player (LHP)	Cuba
1988	Héctor Espino	Player (1B)	Mexico
1988	Horacio Piña	Player (RHP)	Mexico
1988	Arnulfo Rodríguez	Executive	Mexico
1988	Pedro Septién	Writer	Mexico
1989	Ray Dandridge	Player (SS)	United States
1989	Oscar Esquivel	Writer	Mexico
1989	José Guerrero	Player (3B)	Mexico
1989	Teodoro Mariscal	Executive	Mexico
1990	Alfonso Robinson Bours	Executive	Mexico
1990	Amado Maestri	Umpire	Cuba
1990	Ramón Montoya	Player (CF)	Mexico
1990	Tommy Morales	Writer	Mexico
1990	Alfredo Ríos	Player (3B)	Mexico
1991	Jaime Corella	Player (C)	Mexico
1991	Agustín de Valdez	Writer	Mexico
1991	Juan Lima	Umpire	Mexico
1991	Chara Mansur	Executive	Mexico
1991	Antonio Pollorena	Player (RHP)	Mexico
1992	Jorge Blanco	Writer	Mexico
1992	José Peña	Player (RHP)	Mexico
1992	Benjamín 'Cananea' Reyes	Manager	Mexico
1992	Armando Rodríguez	Umpire	Cuba
1992	Vicente Romo	Player (RHP)	Mexico
1993	Ramón Arano	Player (RHP)	Mexico
1993	Humberto Galaz	Writer	Mexico
1993	René González	Player (1B)	Cuba
1993	Aurelio López	Player (RHP)	Mexico
1993	Homobono Márquez	Executive	Mexico
1993	Alfredo Ortiz	Player (LHP)	Mexico
1993	Oscar Rodríguez	Player (CF)	Puerto Rico
1994	Jaime Pérez Avella	Executive	Mexico
1994	Carlos Galina	Player (1B)	Mexico
1994	Miguel Gaspar	Player (C)	Mexico
1994	Celerino Sánchez	Player (3B)	Mexico
1994	Miguel Suárez	Player (RF)	Mexico
1995	Rodolfo Alvarado	Player (RHP)	Mexico
1995	William Berzunza	Player (1B)	Mexico
1995	Arnoldo Castro	Player (2B)	Mexico
1995	Aurelio Rodríguez	Player (3B)	Mexico
1996	Jorge Alarcón	Writer	Mexico
1996	César Díaz	Player (RHP)	Mexico
1996	Juan Manuel Ley	Executive	Mexico
1996	Orestes Miñoso	Player (RF)	Cuba
1996	Jorge Orta	Player (2B)	Mexico
1997	Andrés Ayón	Player (RHP)	Cuba
1997	Alfonso Araujo Bojorquez	Writer	Mexico
1997	Maximino León	Player (RHP)	Mexico
1997	Víctor Saíz	Umpire	Mexico
1998	Don Eugenio Garza Sada	Executive	Mexico
1998	Marcelo Juárez	Player (CF)	Mexico
1998	Juan Navarrete	Player (2B)	Mexico
1998	Miguel Solís	Player (RHP)	Mexico
1999	George Brunet	Player (LHP)	United States
1999	Pedro Treto Cisneros	Executive	Mexico
1999	Gregorio Luque	Player (C)	Mexico
1999	Francisco Maytorena	Player (RHP)	Mexico
2000	Francisco 'Paquín' Estrada	Player (C)	Mexico
2000	Gabriel Lugo	Player (2B)	Mexico
2000	Roberto Méndez	Player (2B)	Mexico
2000	Mario Mendoza	Player (SS)	Mexico
2001	Jorge Fitch	Player (SS)	Mexico
2001	Jack Pierce	Player (1B)	United States
2001	Pedro Ramírez	Player (CF)	Mexico
2001	Rudy Sandoval	Player (C)	Mexico
2002	Salomé Barojas	Player (RHP)	Mexico
2002	Ernesto Escárrega	Player (RHP)	Mexico
2002	Roberto Mansur Galán	Executive	Mexico
2002	José Maiz García	Executive	Mexico
2002	Mario Hernández Maytorena	Executive	United States
2002	Jesús Sommers	Player (3B)	Mexico
2003	Nelson Barrera	Player (3B)	Mexico
2003	Enrique Kerlegand	Writer	Mexico
2003	Andrés Mora	Player (1B)	Mexico
2003	Enrique Romo	Player (RHP)	Mexico
2003	Fermín Vázquez	Player (3B)	Mexico
2004	Sid Monge	Player (LHP)	Mexico
2004	Elpidio Osuna	Player (CF)	Mexico
2004	Chico Rodríguez	Player (SS)	Mexico
2004	Ismael Ruiz	Umpire	Mexico
2005	Cecilio Acosta	Player (RHP)	Mexico
2005	Enrique Aguilar	Player (3B)	Mexico
2005	Herminio Domínguez	Player (LHP)	Mexico
2005	Rafael Garcia	Player (RHP)	United States
2005	Alvaro Lebrija	Executive	Mexico
2006	Jorge de la Serna	Writer	Mexico
2006	José Isabel Jiménez	Writer	Mexico
2006	Jaime Orozco	Player (RHP)	Mexico
2006	Sergio Robles	Player (C)	Mexico
2006	Ray Torres	Player (RF)	Mexico
2007	Francisco Alcaraz	Umpire	Mexico
2007	Benjamín Cerda	Player (3B)	Mexico
2007	Houston Jiménez	Player (SS)	Mexico
2007	Carlos Soto	Player (C)	Mexico
2008	Antonio Briones	Player (2B)	Mexico
2008	Enrique Castillo	Player (RHP)	Mexico
2008	Arcadio Valenzuela	Executive	Mexico
2009	Salvador Colorado	Player (RHP)	Mexico
2009	Arturo González	Player (RHP)	Mexico
2009	Juan José Pacho	Player (SS)	Mexico
2009	Domingo Setien	Broadcaster	Mexico
2010	Derek Bryant	Player (OF)	United States
2010	Efraín Ibarra	Umpire	Mexico
2010	Armando Reynoso	Player (RHP)	Mexico
2010	Gerardo Sánchez	Player (OF)	Mexico
2010	Alonso Téllez	Player (OF)	Mexico
2011	Jimmie Collins	Player (OF)	United States
2011	Mercedes Esquer	Player (LHP)	Mexico
2011	Teodoro Higuera	Player (LHP)	Mexico
2011	Arturo León Lerma	Executive	Mexico
2012	Ángel Moreno	Player (LHP)	Mexico
2012	Alejandro Ortiz	Player (3B)	Mexico
2012	Juan Francisco Rodríguez	Player (2B)	Mexico
2012	Eduardo Valdez Vizcarra	Broadcaster	Mexico
2013	Cornelio García	Player (1B)	Mexico
2013	Alfredo Mariscal	Player (LHP)	Mexico
2013	Jesús Ríos	Player (RHP)	Mexico
2013	Juan Suby	Player (RHP)	Mexico
2013	Jesús Monter	Umpire	Mexico
2014	Daniel Fernández	Player (OF)	Mexico
2014	Cuauhtémoc Rodríguez	Executive	Mexico
2014	Ricardo Sáenz	Player (OF)	Mexico
2014	Fernando Valenzuela	Player (LHP)	Mexico
2020	Matías Carrillo	Player (OF)	Mexico
2020	Vinicio Castilla	Player (3B)	Mexico
2020	Isidro Márquez	Player (RHP)	Mexico
2020	José Luis Sandoval	Player (SS)	Mexico
2020	Eduardo Jiménez	Player (OF)	Mexico
2020	Barney Serrell	Player (2B)	United States
2020	Jorge Menéndez Torre	Broadcaster	Mexico
2023	Alfredo Harp Helú	Executive	Mexico
2023	Luis Arredondo	Player (OF)	Mexico
2023	Roberto Vizcarra	Player (2B)	Mexico
2023	Javier Robles	Player (SS)	Mexico
2023	Noé Muñoz	Player (C)	Mexico
2023	Juan Gabriel Castro	Player (SS)	Mexico
2023	Alejo Ahumada	Player (P)	Mexico
2023	Jesús Moreno	Player (P)	Mexico
2023	Tomás Herrera	Manager	Mexico
2024	Juan Manuel Palafox	Player (P)	Mexico
2024	Ramón Orantes	Player (IF)	Mexico
2024	Cecilio Ruiz	Player (P)	Mexico
2024	Miguel Flores	Player (2B)	Mexico
2024	Yovani Gallardo	Player (P)	Mexico
2024	Richard Sandate	Player (P)	United States
2024	Luis Alberto Ramírez	Umpire	Mexico
2025
2025	Francisco Campos	Player (RHP)	Mexico
2025	Jorge de la Rosa	Player (LHP)	Mexico
2025	Enrique Mazón	Executive	Mexico
2025	Roberto Ramírez	Player (LHP)	Mexico
2025	Óscar Robles	Player (2B)	Mexico
2025	Roberto Saucedo	Player (1B)	Mexico
2025	Ismael Valdez	Player (RHP)	Mexico

== See also ==
- Mexican baseball awards
