= Bobby Ávila =

Mexican baseball player (1924–2004)

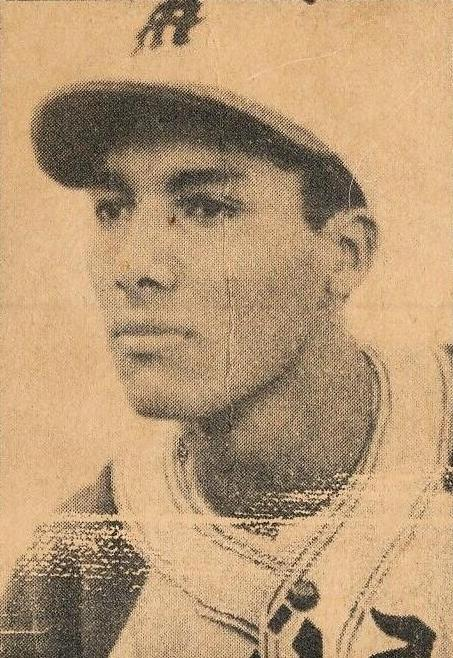
- Ávila with Marianao in 1948
- Second baseman
- Born: April 2, 1924; Veracruz City, Mexico
- Died: October 26, 2004 (aged 80); Veracruz City, Mexico
- Batted: Right Threw: Right

MLB debut
- April 30, 1949, for the Cleveland Indians

Last MLB appearance
- September 29, 1959, for the Milwaukee Braves

MLB statistics
- Batting average: .281
- Home runs: 80
- Runs batted in: 467
- Stats at Baseball Reference

Teams
- Cleveland Indians (1949–1958); Baltimore Orioles (1959); Boston Red Sox (1959); Milwaukee Braves (1959)

Career highlights and awards
- 3× All-Star (1952, 1954, 1955); AL batting champion (1954)

Member of the Mexican Professional

Baseball Hall of Fame
- Induction: 1971

Roberto Francisco Ávila González (April 2, 1924 – October 26, 2004), known as "Beto" in Mexico and as "Bobby" in the United States, was a Mexican professional baseball second baseman.

A native of Veracruz, Mexico, Ávila began his career playing for the Puebla Angeles of the Mexican League from 1943 to 1947. He played 10 seasons in Major League Baseball for the Cleveland Indians from 1949 to 1958 before dividing the 1959 season between the Baltimore Orioles, Boston Red Sox, and Milwaukee Braves.

Ávila won the 1954 American League batting championship with a .341 batting average. He also received The Sporting News American League Player of the Year award in 1954 and was named to the American League All-Star team in 1952, 1954, and 1955.

After retiring as a player, Ávila owned a Mexican baseball team and became president of the Mexican League. He became mayor of Veracruz in 1980 and later served two terms in the Mexican national legislature. He was inducted into the Mexican Professional Baseball Hall of Fame in 1971 and the Latino Baseball Hall of Fame in 2010.

== Early years ==
Ávila was born in 1924 in Veracruz, Mexico, to Maria Gonzalez and Jorge Ávila.

Ávila played baseball and soccer as a youth. He began playing professional soccer as a teenager. He then switched to baseball, playing for the semi-professional Cordoba club. He began as a pitcher, but later converted to second base.

== Professional baseball player ==
=== Mexican League (1943–1947) ===
Ávila began his baseball professional baseball career at age 19 with the Puebla Angeles of the Mexican League. He played for Puebla from 1943 to 1947. In 1947, he led the Mexican League with a .346 batting average.

=== Initial seasons in US (1948–1950) ===
The Cleveland Indians signed Avila in 1948 for a $17,500 bonus and assigned him to the Baltimore Orioles, the Indians' farm team in the International League. He missed two months during the 1948 season after undergoing surgery for a hernia. He appeared in 56 games for the Orioles and compiled a .220 batting average.

In September 1948, the Orioles sold Ávila to the Cleveland Indians. He made his major league debut on April 30, 1949, but with Hall of Famer Joe Gordon starting 145 games as the Indians' second baseman, Ávila appeared in only 31 games and had only 14 at bats during the 1949 season.

An injury to Joe Gordon finally gave Ávila the opportunity to play during the 1950 season. He appeared 80 games, 52 as the Indians' starting second baseman. He compiled a .299 batting average and a .390 on-base percentage.

=== Peak years (1951–1955) ===
In 1951, Ávila began a string of five consecutive seasons in which he started at least 135 games as the Indians' second baseman. During those five seasons, which were the peak of Ávila's career, he appeared in 716 games and compiled a .301 batting average, .374 on-base percentage, and 839 hits.

In 1952, Ávila appeared in a career-high 150 games and ranked among the American League leaders with 11 triples (first), 28 errors (first), 179 hits (second), 19 sacrifice hits (second), 431 assists (third), and a .300 batting average (eighth). He was also selected as the American League's starting second baseman for the 1952 Major League Baseball All-Star Game. He had one hit and an RBI in two at bats in the All-Star Game.

In 1953, Ávila had one of his best defensive seasons. He led American League second basemen in fielding percentage (.986), assists (445), and range factor per nine innings (5.86).

In 1954, Ávila had the best season of his career despite breaking his right thumb on June 2 when Hank Bauer slid into him at second base. His batting average, which stood at .392 at the time of the injury, fell precipitously after the injury but then rebounded. He ended the season with career highs in batting average (.341), on-base percentage (.402), home runs (15), RBIs (67), and runs (112). He won the American League batting championship and received The Sporting News Player of the Year award.

The 1954 Cleveland team, loaded with talent that included Ávila, Bob Lemon, Larry Doby, and Al Rosen, won 111 games and the American League pennant. The 1954 World Series matched the two leagues' batting champions, Ávila and Willie Mays. Ávila had only two hits in 15 at bats during the World Series.

Ávila was selected as an All-Star for a second time in 1954 and for a third time in 1955. In the 1954 All-Star Game, he had three hits in three at bats, scored a run, and had two RBIs. Ávila was the first Mexican-born player to play in an All-Star Game and the first to win a batting championship.

=== Final years as a player (1956–1960) ===
Ávila's offensive production declined after the 1955 season. His batting average fell in his final three years in Cleveland to .224, .268, and .253 respectively. In 1957, Harry Grayson wrote a syndicated column on "The Sudden Fall of Bobby Avila", a matter that was "a national calamity in Mexico." Cleveland manager Kerby Farrell observed: "They just pitch Avila close to the hands and nothing happens. The ball no longer travels when he hits it."

In his final season in the major leagues, he played for three different teams. He was traded by the Indians on December 2, 1958, to the Baltimore Orioles in exchange for Russ Heman and $30,000. He was shifted to right field by the Orioles, starting nine games at the position. He compiled a .170 batting average in 47 at bats.

On May 21, 1959, the Orioles sold Ávila to the Boston Red Sox. He returned to second base and hit .244 in 45 at bats for Boston.

On July 21, 1959, the Red Sox sold Ávila to the Milwaukee Braves. In his first game for the Braves, he hit a two-run home run in the ninth inning for a Milwaukee victory. He started 45 games at second base for the Braves and hit .238 in 172 at bats.

Dealt three times in the last season of his career, Ávila returned to Mexico for the 1960 season. In his final season as a professional baseball player, he played for the Mexico City Tigers, compiled a .333 batting average and set a Mexican League record with 124 walks.

=== Career statistics ===
In 11 major league seasons, Ávila compiled a .281 batting average and a .359 on-base percentage with 1,296 hits, 80 home runs, 467 RBIs, 725 runs, 185 doubles, 35 triples, and 78 stolen bases in 1,300 games.

G	PA	AB	R	H	2B	3B	HR	RBI	SB	BB	SO	BA	OBP	SLG	Fld%
1300	5344	4620	725	1296	185	35	80	467	78	561	399	.281	.359	.388	.979

== Later years and legacy ==
As the first Mexican-born player to have success in Major League Baseball, Ávila became a national hero in Mexico. Fernando Valenzuela said: "Everyone knows who Avila was in Mexico. He was an inspiration, of course, for Mexican ballplayers to follow to the States and play in the major leagues." Hall of Fame broadcaster called Ávila "a tremendous source of pride for the Mexican ballplayers."

The Estadio Universitario Beto Ávila in Veracruz, and the Estadio de Béisbol Beto Ávila in Cancun were named in his honor.

After retiring from baseball, Ávila purchased the Veracruz Eagles and later became president of the Mexican League.

In 1971, he was inducted into the Mexican Professional Baseball Hall of Fame.

In 1980, Ávila was elected as the mayor of his home city of Veracruz. He later served two three-year terms in the Mexican national legislature.

In the book "Casino: Love and Horror in Las Vegas" Frank Rosenthal mentions telling his bookie "Availa's out" when Bobby Availa was going to miss a game due to injury so the bookie could adjust the betting odds.

In 1999, The Sporting News chose Ávila as the second baseman on its All-Star Latin American team.

In 2004, Ávila died at age 80 in Veracruz. The cause of death was complications from diabetes and a lung ailment.

In 2010, Ávila was posthumously inducted in the Latino Baseball Hall of Fame.

In 2020, Ávila was selected as the starting second baseman on the Mexican League Historic Ideal Team by a committee of baseball journalists and historians.

== See also ==
- List of Major League Baseball batting champions
- List of Major League Baseball annual triples leaders
