= Leo Rodríguez (baseball) =

Mexican baseball player (1929–2011)

- Third baseman
- Born: 1 June 1929; Tlahualilo, Durango, Mexico
- Died: 16 August 2011 (aged 82)
- Batted: Right Threw: Right

Teams
- Algodoneros de Torreón (Mexican League) (1949–1953); Mineros de Cananea (Arizona–Texas League) (1954); Hollywood Stars (PCL) (1955, 1957); Tigres de México (Mexican League) (1955–1956); Columbus Jets (IL) (1958–1960); Diablos Rojos del México (Mexican League) (1961–1965, 1971)

Career highlights and awards
- Mexican League Rookie of the Year Award (1949)

Member of the Mexican Professional

Baseball Hall of Fame
- Induction: 1980

Leonardo Briones Rodríguez (1 July 1929 – 16 August 2011) was a Mexican professional baseball player notable for his time in the Mexican League. Rodríguez's playing career began in 1949 and ended in 1971. He debuted in 1949 with Unión Laguna de Torreón and won the Rookie of the Year Award. He was elected to the Mexican Professional Baseball Hall of Fame in 1980.

He was born in Tlahualilo Municipality, Mexico and died on 16 August 2011.

== Personal life ==
Rodríguez's son, Carlos, played in Major League Baseball (MLB) for the New York Yankees and Boston Red Sox.
