= Alejandro Aguilar Reyes =

Alejandro Aguilar Reyes (May 2, 1902 - November 12, 1961), who also wrote under the pseudonym Fray Nano, was a Mexican sportswriter and co-founder of the Mexican League, the first professional baseball league in Mexico. He founded the first daily sports newspaper, La Afición. He was selected to the Mexican Professional Baseball Hall of Fame in 1971.

== Career in baseball ==
By the age of 23, Reyes had already gained recognition as a sportswriter under the pseudonym Fray Nano. The name came from his younger brother's mispronunciation of "Alejandro" as "Nano". Reyes added Fray, which is a Spanish word for a religious brother. He spent a year in the United States and observed the organized professional baseball there. Reyes decided to approach a friend, former baseball player Ernesto Carmona, with a proposal for a Mexican professional baseball league. The Mexican League was founded in 1925. In 1930, Reyes founded the world's first daily newspaper devoted to sports, La Afición.

Reyes remained high commissioner of the Mexican League until 1942, when he resigned. In October 1947, the league's owners named Reyes high commissioner again. He replaced Jorge Pasquel, who the owners kept as the league president, one of the league directors and owner of the team in Veracruz. At the end of January, Reyes resigned again. While Reyes was attempting to smooth over relations with professional baseball executives in the United States, he had grown frustrated by Pasquel's bold assertions of authority.

== Later life ==
Reyes died at the Hospital Español in Mexico City on November 12, 1961. He had suffered from heart problems and diabetes.

== Honors and awards ==
He was elected to the Mexican Professional Baseball Hall of Fame in 1971 and was inducted during the first ceremony in 1973. El Estadio Fray Nano is a baseball stadium in Mexico that was home to the Diablos Rojos del México beginning in 2015. The Diablos Rojos began playing at a new stadium in 2019.

== See also ==
- List of members of the Mexican Professional Baseball Hall of Fame
