= Indios de Anáhuac =

Mexican baseball team

Information
- League: Mexican League (1939; 1953)
- Location: Mexico City, Mexico
- Ballpark: Parque Delta
- Established: 1939
- Folded: 1953

The Indios de Anáhuac (English: Anáhuac Indians) were a professional baseball team in the Mexican League (LMB) based in Mexico City. They played their home games at the Parque Delta. The Indios only played two seasons in the LMB: in 1939 and 1953.

== History ==
The Indios de Anáhuac played its first professional season in 1939 in the Mexican League, based in Mexico City's Parque Delta. The Indios were managed by George Sampson and had Ramón Bragaña, Alberto Romo Chávez, Basilio Rosell and Anastasio Santaella amongst their players. The team finished the season fourth with a 31–28 record.

Anáhuac and Tigres de Comintra, the two teams from Mexico City, folded after the 1939 season, leaving the city with no professional baseball teams, until the next year, when the Rojos del México were established.

After the 1952 Mexican League season, the Charros de Jalisco relocated to Mexico City becoming the Indios de Anáhuac. Jesús Díaz was appointed manager of the team. The Indios struggled to get fans into the stadium and folded after sixty games due to financial problems; they finished fourth in the 1953 season.

The team was sold and became the Azules de México in 1954.

== Season-by-season ==
Season	League	Finish	Wins	Loses	Win%	GB	Manager	Ref
1939	LMB	4th	31	28	.525	15.5	(United States) George Sampson	
1953	LMB	4th	37	35	.514	6.0	(Mexico) Jesús Díaz	
Totals			W	L	Win%			
Totals			68	63	.519	All-time regular season record		
