= Francisco Alcaraz (footballer) =

Paraguayan football forward (born 1960)

Personal information
- Full name: Francisco Javier Alcaraz
- Date of birth: 4 October 1960 (age 66)
- Place of birth: Paraguay
- Position: Forward

Senior career*
Years	Team	Apps	(Gls)
- Club Nacional

International career
- Paraguay
- * Club domestic league appearances and goals

Francisco Javier Alcaraz (born 4 October 1960) is a Paraguayan football forward who played for Paraguay in the 1986 FIFA World Cup. He also played for Club Nacional.
