= Mel Almada =

Mexican baseball player (1913–1988)

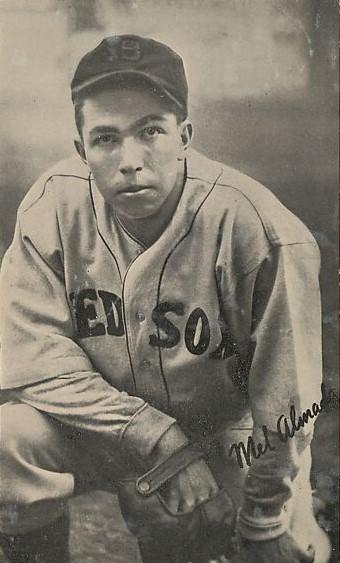
- Almada in 1936
- Outfielder
- Born: February 7, 1913; Huatabampo, Sonora, Mexico
- Died: August 13, 1988 (aged 75); Caborca, Sonora, Mexico
- Batted: Left Threw: Left

MLB debut
- September 8, 1933, for the Boston Red Sox

Last MLB appearance
- October 1, 1939, for the Brooklyn Dodgers

MLB statistics
- Batting average: .284
- Home runs: 15
- Runs batted in: 197
- Stats at Baseball Reference

Teams
- Boston Red Sox (1933–1937); Washington Senators (1937–1938); St. Louis Browns (1938–1939); Brooklyn Dodgers (1939)

Member of the Mexican Professional

Baseball Hall of Fame
- Induction: 1971

Baldomero "Mel" Almada Quirós (February 7, 1913 – August 13, 1988) was a Mexican center fielder in Major League Baseball who played from 1933 through 1939 for the Boston Red Sox (1933–1937), Washington Senators (1937–1938), St. Louis Browns (1938–1939) and Brooklyn Dodgers (1939). He batted and threw left-handed.

A native of Huatabampo, Sonora, Mexico, Almada made history by becoming the first Mexican baseball player to play in the major leagues.

== Biography ==
Raised and educated in California, Almada attended Los Angeles High School, where he was a teammate of future major leaguer Bud Bates. As an outfielder, Almada was noted for his throwing arm. He primarily batted leadoff due to his pitch selection and ability to execute bunts.

Almada was signed by the Boston Red Sox out of the Pacific Coast League. He made his Major League debut with the Red Sox on September 8, 1933, batting .344 in 14 game appearances. On October 1 of that season, Almada batted the last hit Babe Ruth gave up as a pitcher. Overall, he had three hits and two walks off Ruth.

Almada then became an everyday player in 1935, appearing in 151 games and finishing with a .290 average and 20 stolen bases.

In the 1937 midseason, Almada was traded by Boston along with the brothers Rick and Wes Ferrell to the Washington Senators in exchange for Ben Chapman and Bobo Newsom. At the time of the deal, Almada was hitting just .236, but he hit .309 the rest of the way, ending with a .296 average, 91 runs and 27 doubles. On July 25, during the first game of a doubleheader against the St. Louis Browns, Almada scored five runs to tie a Major League record. When he added four runs in the second game, he set an 18-inning Major League record with nine runs scored in a double-header.

After a .244 start in 1938, Almada was sent by Washington to the Browns in exchange for All-Star outfielder Sam West. Almada hit .342 with St. Louis, ending with .311, 101 runs, 197 hits and 29 doubles, all career-high numbers. That season, he also had a stretch in which he had a base hit in 54-out-of-56 games from June 21 through Aug 19 (second game), meaning he fell just two hitless games short of Joe DiMaggio's record 56-game hitting streak. But he slumped to .239 in 1939 and was sold to the Brooklyn Dodgers. With Brooklyn, he was used as a backup outfielder and pinch-hitting specialist. He made his last Major League appearance on October 1, 1939.

In a seven-season career, Almada posted a .284 batting average with 15 home runs and 197 RBI in 646 games.

Almada returned to the Pacific Coast League for one season with the Sacramento Solons in 1940. He later managed in the Mexican League. In 1972, he was inducted to the Mexican Baseball Hall of Fame.

== Personal life ==
Mel's older brother, Lou Almada, was also a professional baseball player.

Mel Almada died in his home state of Sonora, Mexico, at age 75.
