= Algodoneros de Unión Laguna =

Minor League Baseball Mexican League franchise in Torreon, Mexico

Logo	Cap insignia

Information
- League: Mexican League (North Division)
- Location: Torreón, Coahuila
- Ballpark: Estadio de la Revolución
- Founded: 1940 (original); 1985 (modern incarnation)
- Nickname: Máquina Guinda (Maroon Machine)
- League championships: 2 (1942, 1950)
- Division championships: 5 (1974, 1976, 1978, 1990, 2023)
- Former name: Vaqueros Unión Laguna (2017); Vaqueros Laguna (2003-2016); Unión Laguna de Torreón (1940-1953)
- Former ballparks: Estadio Rosa Laguna; Estadio Superior
- Colors: Maroon, white, gold
- Mascot: Pollo Algodonero (Cottoneer Chicken)
- Ownership: Guillermo Murra Marroquín
- General manager: Francisco Méndez
- Manager: Ramón Santiago
- Website: www.unionlaguna.mx

Current uniforms
Home	Away

The Algodoneros de Unión Laguna (English: Laguna Union Cotton Farmers) are a professional baseball team in the Mexican League (LMB). Based in Torreón, Coahuila, they play in the North Division of LMB.

== History ==
=== Early years ===
The team was established in 1940 under the name Algodoneros de Unión Laguna, named for the Compañía Jabonera La Unión (La Unión Soap Company), the team's first sponsor, and was led by Cuban manager Jesús "Matanzas" Valdez.

Unión Laguna made its professional debut in the Mexican League on 31 March 1940 against La Junta de Nuevo Laredo in the Estadio de la Revolución in Torreón. The lineup was as follows: Roy K. Williams (pitcher), Tomás Trujilo (catcher), Eusebio Contreras (first base), Chester Williams (second base), Pedro Morales (third base), Cool Papa Bell (shortstop), Juan Ramírez (left field), Amadeo Lozano (center field), and Luis Molina (right field).

The team won its first Mexican League championship in 1942 under manager Martín Dihigo. The franchise moved to Nuevo Laredo in 1944, but an expansion club restored baseball to the region between 1946 and 1953. In the 1950 season, Laguna won their second and latest title to date, with Guillermo Garibay as manager, defeating Charros de Jalisco 4 games to 2 in the Final Series.

=== 1970–1981 ===
With the creation of the Zona Norte in 1970, the Comarca Lagunera returned to the Mexican League. The new Algodoneros de Unión Laguna played their home games in Gómez Palacio, Durango from 1970 to 1974, and moved across the border to Torreón for the 1975 season with the construction of Estadio Superior, which reused the structure of the former Colt Stadium in Houston. The move coincided with new ownership, Don Juan Abusaid Ríos. The team won the Zona Norte in 1974, 1976, and 1978, but fell to the Diablos Rojos del México (1974, 1976) and Rieleros de Aguascalientes (1978) in the league championship. After the 1981 season and a falling out between ownership and Governor José de las Fuentes, Abusaid sold the team to the Sindicato de Trabajadores Petroleros de la República Mexicana (Union of Oil Workers of the Mexican Republic), which moved the franchise to Tampico, Tamaulipas. While the stadium was taken down in Torreón and moved to Tampico, the franchise spent the 1982 season in Monclova, Coahuila, as the Astros de Monclova.

=== 1985–2003 ===
In 1985, the Indios de Ciudad Juárez were bought by Jorge Dueñes Zurita and moved to Torreón, where the franchise has remained since. The team made the postseason in 1989, 1990, 1992, and 1994, but in their lone league championship appearance in 1990, they fell in five games to the Bravos de León. Unión Laguna was bought in 1997 by FEMSA-Cervecería Cuauhtémoc-Moctezuma, which sold the team in 2002 to Ricardo Martín Bringas, the director general of Organización Soriana.

=== Vaqueros Laguna ===
Vaqueros Laguna logo used between the 2003 and 2016 seasons

At the beginning of the 21st century, the new management opted to change the team's name and colors. The Vaqueros Laguna (Laguna Cowboys) donned orange uniforms beginning with the 2003 season. The team appeared in the playoffs in 2004, 2009, 2014, and 2015, the latter two years as the wild card.

=== Vaqueros Unión Laguna ===
The 2017 season marked a return to tradition for baseball in Torreón as the franchise restored the Unión Laguna name and switched back to maroon as its primary color.

=== Return to Algodoneros ===
The 2018 season further marked a return to tradition for baseball in Torreón, as the franchise restored the original name under which the club had been founded in 1940: the Algodoneros de Unión Laguna.

Among their best players in history are Miguel Gaspar, Guillermo Garibay, Pedro "Charolito" Orta, Moisés Camacho, Leo Rodríguez, Martín Dihigo, Minnie Miñoso, Jesus "Chanquilón" Diaz, Antonio Pollorena, and Héctor Espino.

== Roster ==
Algodoneros de Unión Laguna roster
Players		Coaches/Other
Pitchers: 32 (United States) Luke Albright; 46 (Mexico) Omar Araujo; 67 (United States) Jacob Barnes; 65 (United States) Brandon Brennan; 98 (Mexico) Lupe Chávez; -- (Mexico) Fabián Cota ∞; 55 (Cuba) Roenis Elías; 80 (United States) Matt Foster; 68 (United States) Ryan Hendrix; -- (United States) Travis Lakins Sr. ∞; 14 (United States) Aaron Leasher; -- (Mexico) Miguel León ∞; -- (Cuba) Yoan López ∞; 90 (Mexico) Cristhofer Lozoya; 95 (United States) Thomas McIlraith; 57 (Mexico) Aldo Montes; 26 (Dominican Republic) Ángel Perdomo; 8 (Dominican Republic) Héctor Pérez; 40 (United States) Austin Pope; 30 (Mexico) Joel Rangel; 57 (Venezuela) Ricardo Sánchez; 50 (South Africa) Tayler Scott; -- (Venezuela) José Torres ∞; 88 (United States) Touki Toussaint; 56 (Mexico) Miguel Vázquez	Catchers: 39 (Venezuela) Francisco Arcia; 25 (Mexico) Dean Nevárez; 70 (Mexico) Joseph Sequera; Infielders: 1 (Puerto Rico) Isan Díaz; 62 (Cuba) Albert Lara; 31 (United States) Mason Martin; 33 (Dominican Republic) Eguy Rosario; 43 (Mexico) Edgar Sánchez; 99 (United States) Adrián Tovalín; 36 (United States) Je'Von Ward; Outfielders: 3 (United States) Julian Escobedo; 54 (Mexico) Valentín Hernández; 2 (Mexico) Ramón Mora; 53 (Venezuela) Edward Olivares; 66 (Mexico) Edgar Robles; 10 (United States) Nick Torres	Manager: -- (Dominican Republic) Ramón Santiago; Coaches: 81 (Mexico) Héctor Álvarez (first base); 74 (Mexico) Abdel Grado; 77 (Mexico) Eder Llamas (asst. pitching); 52 (Cuba) Jesús Manso (pitching); 28 (Dominican Republic) Francisco Morales; 4 (Venezuela) Ray Olmedo (third base); 45 (Mexico) Alfredo Meza (catchers); 29 (Dominican Republic) Ronny Paulino (hitting); 7 (Mexico) Arturo Ruiz (bullpen); 7-day injured list; ~ Development list; # Rehab assignment; ∞ Reserve list; ‡ Restricted list; § Suspended list; † Temporarily inactive list; Roster updated September 23, 2026; Transactions; → More rosters: MiLB • Mexican League

== Retired numbers ==
- 6 Pedro Orta
- 11 Guillermo Garibay
- 21 Héctor Espino

== Championships ==
Season	Manager	Opponent	Series score	Record
1942	Martín Dihigo	No final series		48–40
1950	Guillermo Garibay	Charros de Jalisco	4–2	48–36
Total championships			2	
