= Jorge Pasquel =

Mexican baseball executive

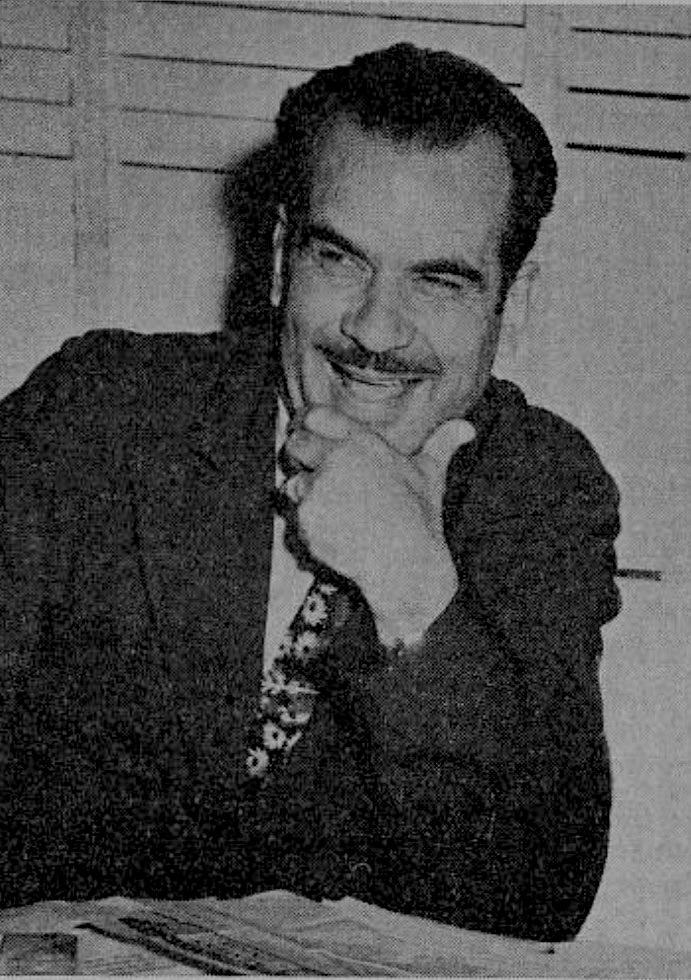

President of the Mexican League
- In office 1946–1948
- Preceded by: Octavio Rueda Magro
- Succeeded by: Eduardo Quijano Pitman

Personal details
- Born: Jorge Pasquel Casanueva; April 23, 1907 Veracruz, Mexico
- Died: March 7, 1955 (aged 47) San Luis Potosí, Mexico
- Baseball career

Member of the Mexican Professional

Baseball Hall of Fame
- Induction: 1971

Jorge Pasquel Casanueva (April 23, 1907 – March 7, 1955) was a Mexican businessman and baseball executive. He was president of the Mexican League and owned interests in several teams at a time when the league recruited from Negro league baseball and Major League Baseball, creating a big threat to the Major League talent level. Jorge Pasquel brought racial integration to professional baseball and had a big role when Jackie Robinson debuted in 1947 with the Brooklyn Dodgers. Pasquel died in a plane crash in 1955. He was inducted into the Mexican Professional Baseball Hall of Fame in 1971.

== Biography ==
=== Early life ===
Pasquel was born in Veracruz, Mexico. When he was a child, U.S. military forces had invaded Veracruz. He and four of his brothers ran a cigar factory and then created additional wealth working in various business ventures. By the mid-1940s, the estimated wealth of the family was in the tens of millions of dollars.

=== Baseball career ===
Pasquel and his brothers owned the Azules de Veracruz of the Mexican League and were minority owners in several other clubs. Pasquel was named Mexican League president in 1946. As early as 1943, Pasquel had begun bringing players over from Negro league baseball (who were barred from MLB). After recruiting successfully from the Negro leagues, Pasquel began to offer high salaries to bring major league talent over to the Mexican League. He may have been driven by nationalism and by a dislike for American imperialism, possibly spurred by the U.S. invasion of his hometown when he was a child. After signing a number of major league players with impressive salaries, Pasquel found that he could not attract high enough attendance in Mexico to offset the salaries. Overall, 18 major league players jumped to the Mexican League.

In 1946, American player Mickey Owen returned to the United States after playing briefly in the Mexican League. He cited poor playing conditions. A long legal battle ensued, after which Owen was determined to owe Pasquel $35,000 for breach of contract. The league took large financial losses in 1947. Baseball commissioner Happy Chandler imposed a lifetime major league ban for players who went to the Mexican League, which was finally lifted after 5 years, when a federal appeals court allowed a former major league player's lawsuit to proceed.

Pasquel and his brother Bernardo left the Mexican League in 1952. The brothers had owned the teams in Veracruz and Mexico City as well as the league's large Parque Delta stadium, now the Parque Delta mall. The players from those two teams were divided among the other six clubs in the league. The Mexican government purchased Parque Delta from Pasquel so that the league could continue using it. Pasquel made headlines the next year when he gained distribution rights for the nation's oil from his cousin, Mexican president Miguel Alemán Valdés.

=== Death and legacy ===
Pasquel was killed in a 1955 plane crash. Shortly after Pasquel's death, the Mexican League became a part of American professional baseball. Pasquel was inducted into the Mexican Professional Baseball Hall of Fame in 1971.

== See also ==
- List of members of the Mexican Professional Baseball Hall of Fame
