= List of Mexican Baseball League batting champions =

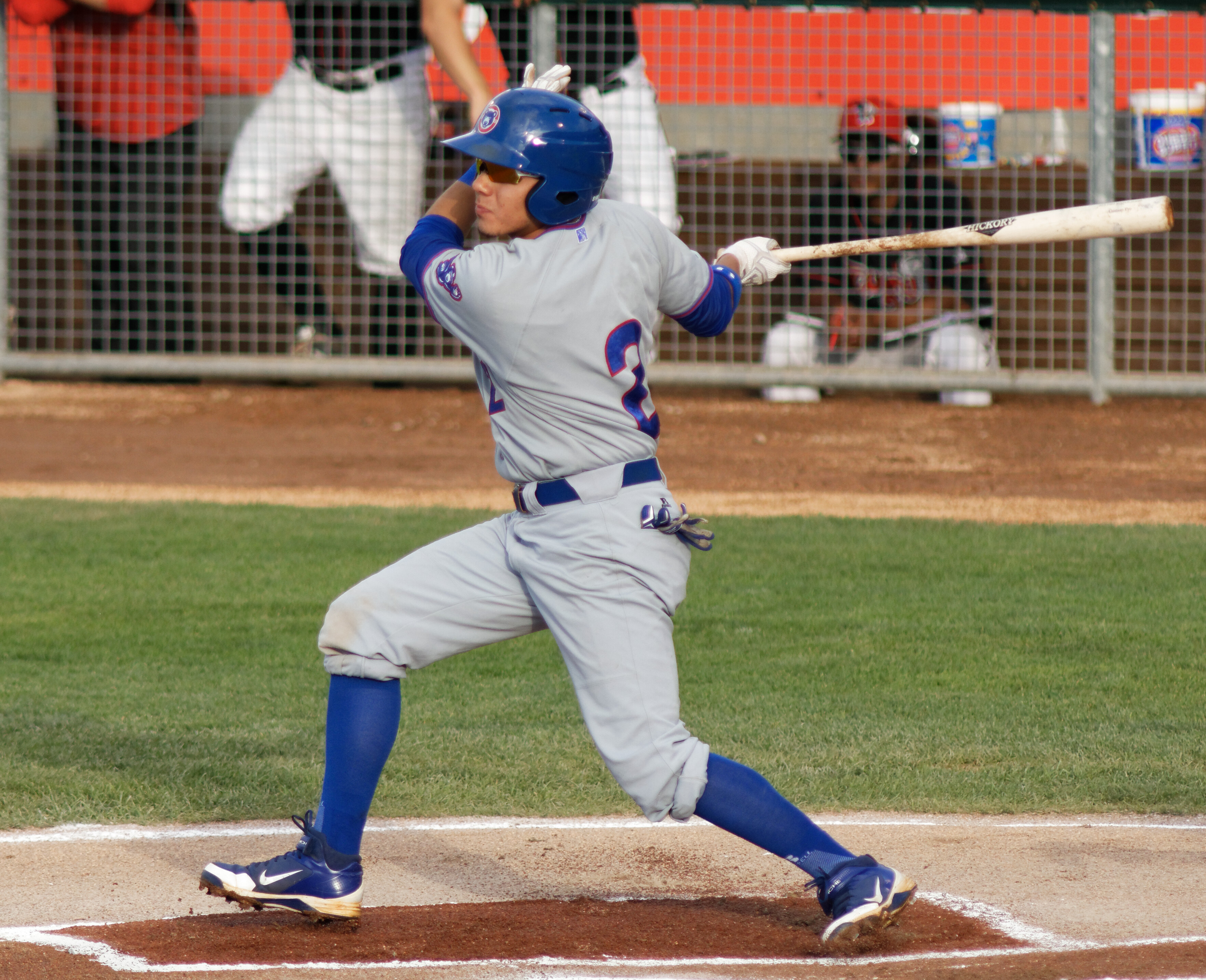
Carlos Sepúlveda, the current batting champion of the Mexican League

In the baseball Mexican League (LMB), the player with the highest batting average at the end of the season wins the "batting title". The first champion was recognized in 1937, the first season that the Mexican League officially recorded statistics.^{[a]} That year, Alfonso Nieto claimed the title with a .476 batting average. The most recent LMB batting champion is Robinson Canó, who slashed .431 while playing for the Diablos Rojos del México during the 2024 season.

Héctor Espino is the most successful batter in the history of the Mexican League batting title, having won it five times, in 1964, 1966, 1967, 1968, and 1973, including three consecutive seasons. The record for the most consecutive batting titles belongs to Al Pinkston, who won four straight from 1959 to 1962. Beto Ávila was the first player to win batting titles in both the Mexican League and Major League Baseball, achieving the feat in 1947 with the Pericos de Puebla and in 1954 with the Cleveland Indians in the American League.

== Winners ==
=== Key ===
Winner	Player with the highest batting average (AVG) in the league
AVG	The winner's batting average
†	Member of the Mexican Professional Baseball Hall of Fame

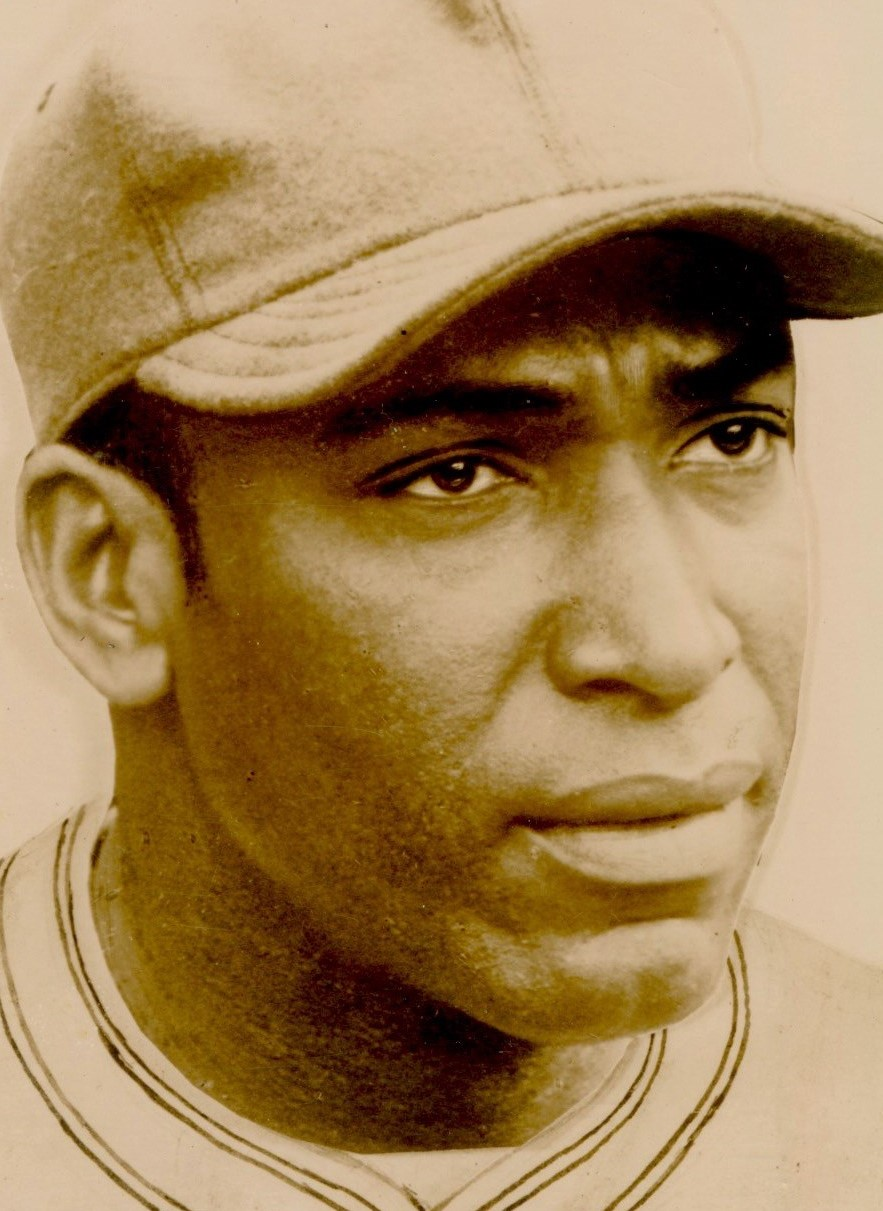
Martín Dihigo batted .387 with El Águila de Veracruz in 1938 to win the title

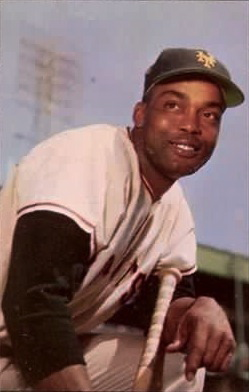
Monte Irvin won the 1942 batting title, slashing .397 with the Azules de Veracruz

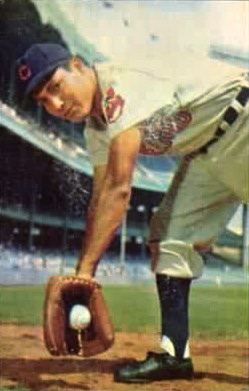
Beto Ávila won the 1947 title and would later capture the American League batting crown in 1954

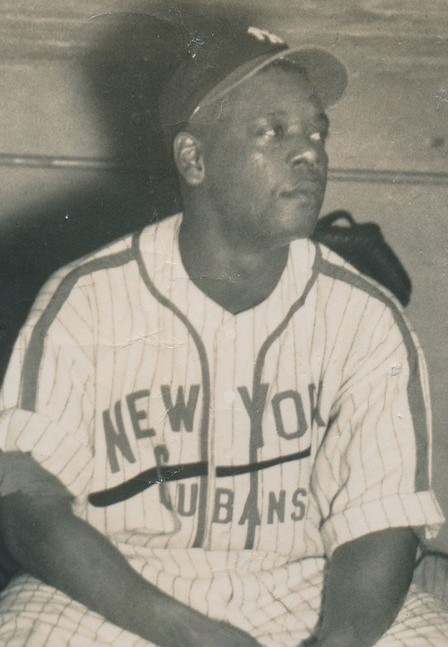
Lorenzo Cabrera batted .350 in 1995 to win the championship

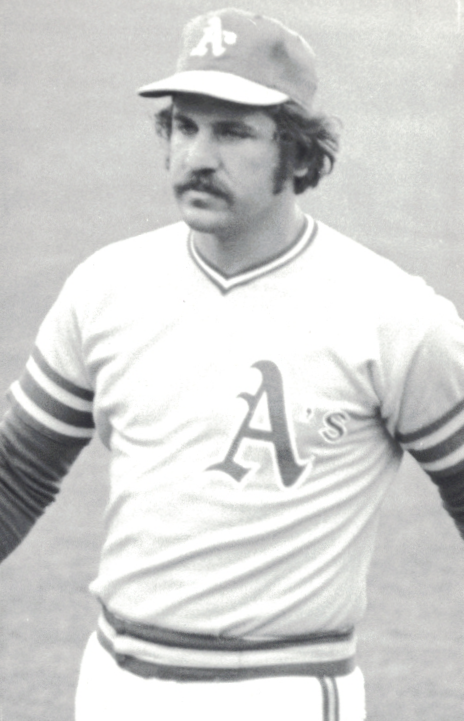
Pat Bourque won the 1975 title playing for the Diablos Rojos del México

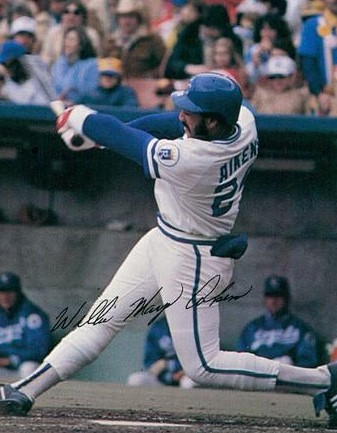
Willie Aikens won two titles, in 1986 and 1989

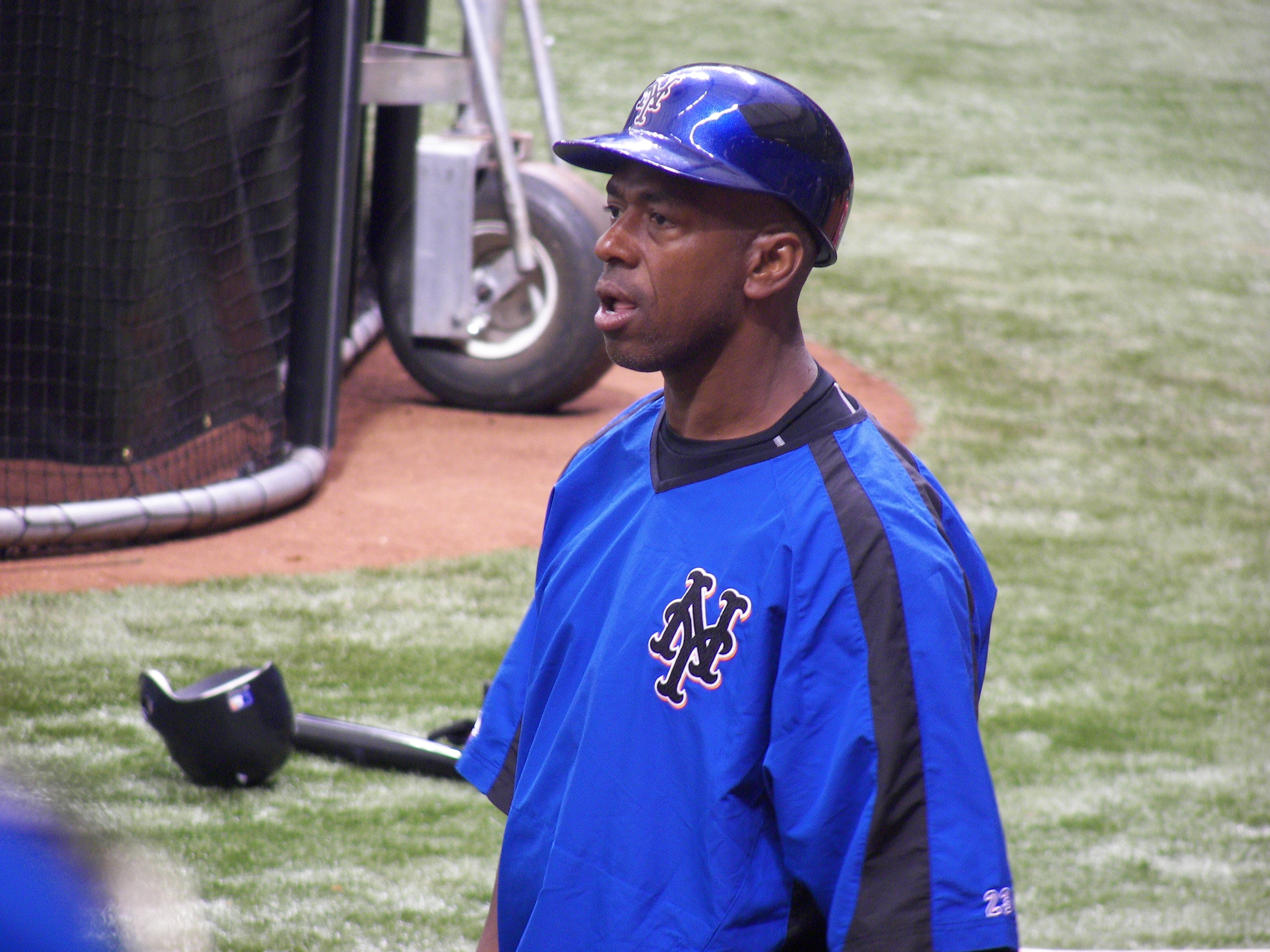
Julio Franco won two titles (1999 and 2001) with the Tigres de México

Year	Winner	AVG	Team(s)	Ref
1937	(Mexico) Alfonso Nieto	.476	Agricultura de México	
1938	(Cuba) Martín Dihigo^{†}	.387	El Águila de Veracruz	
1939	(Cuba) Lázaro Salazar^{†}	.374	Cafeteros de Córdoba	
1940	(United States) Cool Papa Bell	.437	Unión Laguna de Torreón / Azules de Veracruz	
1941	(United States) Bill Wright^{†}	.390	Rojos del México	
1942	(United States) Monte Irvin^{†}	.397	Azules de Veracruz	
1943	(United States) Bill Wright^{†}	.366	Diablos Rojos del México	
1944	(Cuba) Alberto Hernández	.395	Pericos de Puebla	
1945	(Cuba) Claro Duany	.375	Industriales de Monterrey	
1946	(Cuba) Claro Duany	.364	Industriales de Monterrey	
1947	(Mexico) Beto Ávila^{†}	.346	Pericos de Puebla	
1948	(United States) Ray Dandridge^{†}	.369	Azules de Veracruz	
1949	(Cuba) Tribilín Cabrera	.382	Charros de Jalisco	
1950	(Cuba) Lorenzo Cabrera	.355	Diablos Rojos del México	
1951	(Mexico) Ángel Castro^{†}	.354	Azules de Veracruz	
1952	(Cuba) René González^{†}	.370	El Águila de Veracruz	
1953	(Cuba) René González^{†}	.336	Diablos Rojos del México / El Águila de Veracruz	
1954	(Cuba) René González^{†}	.315	El Águila de Veracruz	
1955	(Mexico) Leo Rodríguez^{†}	.385	Tigres de México	
1956	(United States) Alonzo Perry	.392	Diablos Rojos del México	
1957	(Cuba) Aldo Savent	.359	El Águila de Veracruz	
1958	(Panama) Pablo Bernard	.371	Tecolotes de Nuevo Laredo	
1959	(United States) Al Pinkston^{†}	.369	Diablos Rojos del México	
1960	(United States) Al Pinkston^{†}	.397	Diablos Rojos del México	
1961	(United States) Al Pinkston^{†}	.374	El Águila de Veracruz	
1962	(United States) Al Pinkston^{†}	.381	El Águila de Veracruz	
1963	(Mexico) Vinicio García^{†}	.368	Sultanes de Monterrey	
1964	(Mexico) Héctor Espino^{†}	.371	Sultanes de Monterrey	
1965	(Mexico) Emilio Sosa	.368	Petroleros de Poza Rica	
1966	(Mexico) Héctor Espino^{†}	.369	Sultanes de Monterrey	
1967	(Mexico) Héctor Espino^{†}	.379	Sultanes de Monterrey	
1968	(Mexico) Héctor Espino^{†}	.365	Sultanes de Monterrey	
1969	(Venezuela) Teolindo Acosta	.354	Pericos de Puebla	
1970	(Mexico) Francisco Campos	.359	Charros de Jalisco	
1971	(Venezuela) Teolindo Acosta	.392	Leones de Yucatán	
1972	(United States) Donald Anderson	.362	Charros de Jalisco	
1973	(Mexico) Héctor Espino^{†}	.377	Alijadores de Tampico	
1974	(Venezuela) Teolindo Acosta	.366	Ángeles Negros de Puebla	
1975	(United States) Pat Bourque	.372	Diablos Rojos del México	
1976	(United States) Larry Fritz	.355	Rieleros de Aguascalientes	
1977	(Venezuela) Víctor Davalillo	.384	Rieleros de Aguascalientes	
1978	(United States) Romel Canada	.366	Saraperos de Saltillo	
1979	(United States) Jimmie Collins	.438	Dorados de Chihuahua	
1980	(United States) Jimmie Collins	.380	Saraperos de Saltillo	
1981	(United States) Willie Norwood	.365	Broncos de Reynosa	
1982	(United States) Bobby Smith	.357	Indios de Ciudad Juárez	
1983	(United States) Richard Duran	.377	Indios de Ciudad Juárez	
1984	(United States) Jimmie Collins	.412	Diablos Rojos del México / Cafeteros de Córdoba	
1985	(Venezuela) Oswaldo Olivares	.397	Rieleros de Aguascalientes / Piratas de Campeche	
1986	(United States) Willie Aikens	.454	Ángeles Negros de Puebla	
1987	(Puerto Rico) Orlando Sánchez	.415	Ángeles Negros de Puebla	
1988	(United States) Nick Castañeda	.374	Leones de Yucatán	
1989	(United States) Willie Aikens	.395	Bravos de León	
1990	(United States) Nick Castañeda	.388	Leones de Yucatán	
1991	(United States) Rick Renteria	.442	Charros de Jalisco	
1992	(Venezuela) Raúl Pérez Tovar	.416	Acereros de Monclova	
1993	(United States) Nelson Simmons	.382	Charros de Jalisco	
1994	(United States) Adam Casillas	.367	Industriales de Monterrey	
1995	(United States) Ty Gainey	.411	Diablos Rojos del México	
1996	(Mexico) Matías Carrillo^{†}	.368	Tigres de México	
1997	(Mexico) Cornelio García^{†}	.382	Sultanes de Monterrey	
1998	(Dominican Republic) Luis Polonia	.380	Tigres de México	
1998	(Mexico) Miguel Flores^{†}	.380	Sultanes de Monterrey	
1999	(Dominican Republic) Julio Franco	.423	Tigres de México	
2000	(United States) Warren Newson	.386	Algodoneros de Unión Laguna	
2001	(Dominican Republic) Julio Franco	.437	Tigres de México	
2002	(Venezuela) Willie Romero	.387	Saraperos de Saltillo	
2003	(Dominican Republic) Félix José	.377	Diablos Rojos del México	
2004	(United States) Demond Smith	.406	Sultanes de Monterrey	
2005	(Mexico) Javier Robles^{†}	.392	Tigres de la Angelópolis	
2006	(United States) Derrick White	.407	Potros de Tijuana	
2007	(Puerto Rico) Carlos Rivera	.410	Guerreros de Oaxaca	
2008	(United States) Kit Pellow	.385	Saraperos de Saltillo	
2009	(Dominican Republic) Dionys César	.380	Vaqueros Laguna	
2010	(Dominican Republic) Willis Otáñez	.393	Pericos de Puebla	
2011	(Cuba) Bárbaro Cañizares	.396	Guerreros de Oaxaca	
2012	(Cuba) Michel Abreu	.371	Sultanes de Monterrey	
2013	(Mexico) Luis Mauricio Suárez	.413	Pericos de Puebla	
2014	(Dominican Republic) Sandy Madera	.371	Pericos de Puebla	
2015	(Dominican Republic) Jesús Valdez	.363	Leones de Yucatán	
2016	(Mexico) César Tapia	.383	Pericos de Puebla	
2017	(Cuba) Yadir Drake	.385	Generales de Durango	
2018^{[b]}	(Mexico) Isaac Rodríguez	.394	Toros de Tijuana	
2018^{[b]}	(Dominican Republic) Olmo Rosario	.408	Piratas de Campeche	
2019	(Venezuela) Daniel Mayora	.391	Generales de Durango	
2020	No winner. Season canceled due to the COVID-19 pandemic			
2021	(Mexico) Leo Heras	.401	Mariachis de Guadalajara	
2022	(Cuba) Henry Urrutia	.420	Saraperos de Saltillo	
2023	(Mexico) Fernando Villegas	.390	Saraperos de Saltillo	
2024	(Dominican Republic) Robinson Canó	.431	Diablos Rojos del México	
2025	(Mexico) Carlos Sepúlveda	.395	Diablos Rojos del México	
2026	(Mexico) Juan Carlos Gamboa	.371	Diablos Rojos del México	

=== Multiple-time winners ===
Manager	# of Wins	Years
(Mexico) Héctor Espino^{†}	5	1964, 1966, 1967, 1968, 1973
(United States) Al Pinkston^{†}	4	1959, 1960, 1961, 1962
(Cuba) René González^{†}	3	1952, 1953, 1954
(Venezuela) Teolindo Acosta	3	1969, 1971, 1974
(United States) Jimmie Collins	3	1979, 1980, 1984
(United States) Bill Wright^{†}	2	1941, 1943
(Cuba) Claro Duany	2	1945, 1946
(United States) Willie Aikens	2	1986, 1989
(United States) Nick Castañeda	2	1988, 1990
(Dominican Republic) Julio Franco	2	1999, 2001

=== Wins by team ===
Teams	Champions	Years
Diablos Rojos del México	14	1941, 1943, 1950, 1953, 1956, 1959, 1960, 1975, 1984, 1995, 2003, 2024, 2025, 2026
Industriales/Sultanes de Monterrey	11	1945, 1946, 1963, 1964, 1966, 1967, 1968, 1997, 1998, 2004, 2012
El Águila de Veracruz	7	1938, 1952, 1953, 1954, 1957, 1961, 1962
Pericos de Puebla	7	1944, 1947, 1969, 2010, 2013, 2014, 2016
Tigres de México/Angelópolis/Quintana Roo	6	1955, 1996, 1998, 1999, 2001, 2005
Saraperos de Saltillo	6	1978, 1980, 2002, 2008, 2022, 2023
Charros de Jalisco	5	1949, 1970, 1972, 1991, 1993
Azules de Veracruz	4	1940, 1942, 1948, 1951
Leones de Yucatán	4	1971, 1988, 1990, 2015
Unión Laguna de Torreón/Vaqueros Laguna/Algodoneros de Unión Laguna	3	1940, 2000, 2009
Ángeles Negros de Puebla	3	1974, 1986, 1987
Rieleros de Aguascalientes	3	1976, 1977, 1985
Cafeteros de Córdoba	2	1939, 1984
Indios de Ciudad Juárez	2	1982, 1983
Piratas de Campeche	2	1985, 2018
Guerreros de Oaxaca	2	2007, 2011
Generales de Durango	2	2017, 2019
Agricultura de México	1	1937
Tecolotes de Nuevo Laredo/Dos Laredos	1	1958
Petroleros de Poza Rica	1	1965
Alijadores de Tampico	1	1973
Dorados de Chihuahua	1	1979
Broncos de Reynosa	1	1981
Bravos de León	1	1989
Industriales de Monterrey	1	1994
Potros de Tijuana	1	2006
Toros de Tijuana	1	2018
Mariachis de Guadalajara	1	2021

== Notes ==
- ^{a} The Mexican League was established in 1925, but it did not officially recorded statistics until 1937.
- ^{b} The 2018 season was contested in a two-tournament format known as Spring and Autumn, each one with a batting champion.
