= Yochim =

Yochim is surname from the Americanized version of the German name Joachim. Notable people with the surname include:

- Lenny Yochim (1928–2013), American baseball player
- Marie Hirst Yochim (1920–2012), American lineage society leader
- Ray Yochim (1922–2002), American baseball player
