= Tribilín Cabrera =

Cuban baseball player and coach (1922–2019)

- Outfielder / Coach
- Born: 24 February 1922; Cienfuegos Province, Cuba
- Died: 13 June 2019 (aged 97); Guadalajara, Jalisco, Mexico
- Batted: Right Threw: Right

Teams
- Cienfuegos (1949); Charros de Jalisco (1949–1952); Sultanes de Monterrey (1952–1953)

Career highlights and awards
- Mexican League batting champion (1949); Guerreros de Oaxaca #47 retired; Charros de Jalisco #24 retired

Adolfo Alberto Mantecón Sánchez (24 February 1922 – 13 June 2019), better known as Adolfo "Tribilín" Cabrera, was a Cuban professional baseball outfielder and coach. Cabrera played in the Cuban League with Cienfuegos and in the Mexican League with the Charros de Jalisco and the Sultanes de Monterrey from 1949 to 1953. After retiring, he stayed in Mexico and worked as a coach for the Sultanes, Charros and the Guerreros de Oaxaca.

== Early life ==
Cabrera was born on 24 February 1922 in the Cienfuegos Province. He began playing baseball as a child on the beach with his friends. He left school at the age of 15 to help support his family by working at a Cuban company that also had a baseball team. He adopted the name Adolfo Cabrera due to an error at the Cuban passport office, where his name was mistakenly recorded as Adolfo Cabrera, confusing it with his father’s name, Adolfo Mantecón Cabrera.

== Playing career ==
=== Cuban League ===
Cabrera made his professional debut in the Cuban League in 1949 with Cienfuegos, where he posted a .209 batting average in 43 at bats. That same year, he was invited to play professional baseball in both Canada and Mexico, but he chose Mexico due to the better economic conditions offered.

=== Mexican League ===
"A friend in Guadalajara gave me the nickname 'Tribilín'—I think because of my height and my resemblance to the Walt Disney character. In my neighborhood, everyone knows me as Tribilín. If you ask for Adolfo Mantecón, no one knows who that is."

— Cabrera on the origin of his nickname

In 1949, Cabrera signed with the Charros de Jalisco of the Mexican League. He stated that he believed he was coming to play in Mexico City, but was surprised to learn he would instead be playing in Jalisco, a place he had never even heard of. It was during his time in Guadalajara that he received the nickname 'Tribilín', due to his resemblance to Disney’s cartoon character Goofy, known as Tribilín in Spanish.

He made his debut in the Mexican League in 1949, finishing with 65 RBI, 34 doubles, seven home runs and a .382 batting average, winning the league's batting title in his first season in the circuit. He went on to play four additional seasons with the Charros.

On 13 August 1950, while playing for the Charros, Cabrera was involved in a violent altercation at Parque Delta after being hit by a pitch from Rufus Lewis of the Diablos Rojos del México. Cabrera charged the mound and struck Lewis with his bat, after which México outfielder Bill Wright struck Cabrera during the ensuing brawl. Both players were injured and later suspended.

In 1952, Cabrera signed with the Sultanes de Monterrey. On 15 July 1952, while traveling to Mexico City, the Sultanes' team bus was involved in a collision with a truck carrying corn near Linares, Nuevo León. The accident claimed the lives of two players, Vicente Torres and Adolfo García, and injured 12 others, including Cabrera.

Due to the accident, Cabrera was hospitalized and later underwent a rehabilitation process to regain his ability to walk. He never fully recovered and was forced to retire in 1953.

== Coaching career ==
After retiring, Cabrera was offered a position as a coach with the Sultanes de Monterrey. He later joined the Charros de Jalisco as a coach and was part of the teams that won the Mexican League championships in 1967 and 1971. Cabrera also coached in the Mexican Pacific League under manager Cananea Reyes with the Naranjeros de Hermosillo and the Águilas de Mexicali, including during the 1986 Caribbean Series championship won by the Águilas. In 1996, Cabrera joined the newly established Guerreros de Oaxaca as their first base coach.

== Death ==
Cabrera died on 13 June 2019 in Guadalajara, Jalisco, aged 97.

== Legacy ==
Cabrera is regarded as an iconic figure with the Charros de Jalisco, both as a player and coach, and with the Guerreros de Oaxaca as a coach. In 2006, the Guerreros retired Cabrera's number 47. On 10 November 2015, the Charros held a tribute ceremony for Cabrera, unveiling a bust in the corridors of the Estadio Panamericano de Béisbol; they later retired his number 24 on 12 December 2019.
