= León Kellman =

Panamanian baseball player and manager (born 1924)

- Third baseman / Second baseman / Catcher / Manager
- Born: July 11, 1924; Gatún, Panama Canal Zone
- Died: September 13, 1981 (aged 57); Miami, Florida, U.S.
- Batted: Right Threw: Right

Professional debut
- Panamanian league: 1945
- Negro leagues: 1946
- Mexican League: 1951

Last appearance
- Panamanian league: 1958

Negro leagues statistics
- Batting average: .294
- Hits: 48
- Home runs: 1
- Stats at Baseball Reference

Teams
- Cleveland Buckeyes (1946–1948)

Career highlights and awards
- Four-time Negro League All-Star (1946, 1948–1950); Three-time Panamanian league championship (1948–49, 1950–51, 1956–57); Two-time led Baseball World Cup in home runs (1941, 1945); First player in Mexican league history to hit two grand-slams in the same game (1954)

Edric León Kellman (September 4, 1924 – September 13, 1981) was a Panamanian professional baseball player and manager. Listed at 5' 11", 160 lb., Kellman batted and threw right handed. He was born in Gatún, Panama Canal Zone. He played three seasons with the Cleveland Buckeyes of the Negro American League.

Primarily a catcher, Kellman was also competent as a corner outfielder and third baseman. Eventually, he volunteered to fill whatever role the team needed, whether it was spot starter or long reliever. Although he never played in the major leagues, Kellman achieved a measure of notoriety for his many successful years in the Panamanian Baseball League, both during and after World War II, and later for his career in the Mexican League.

A four-time Negro league All-Star, he played in the Negro World Series, managed in Panama and Mexico, and usually represented his country in international tournaments.

== Early life ==
At age 17, Kellman started his baseball journey with the Panama national baseball team that competed in the 1941 Baseball World Cup held in Havana, where he batted the sole home run of the tournament. He then led the BWS batters with two homers in the 1945 tournament.

== Career ==
In 1945 Kellman became a member of the General Electric club of Panama, playing for them two seasons before joining the Cleveland Buckeyes of the Negro leagues in 1946. He posted a .301 batting average as the regular third baseman of the Buckeyes, improving to a .306 mark in 1947.

In that season, Cleveland won the Negro American League championship behind catcher/manager Quincy Trouppe, advancing to face the Negro National League champions New York Cubans in the 1947 Negro World Series. The Cubans, guided by catcher/manager José Fernández, defeated the Buckeyes four games to one. Kellman went 8-for-20 (.400) to lead the Buckeyes in the Series, though they featured future big leaguers as Trouppe, Al Smith and Sam Jethroe (.316), who was the only other player over .300.

In 1948 Kellman batted .307 for Cleveland, posting a better average than Jethroe (.296), Elston Howard (.283) or Willie Mays (.262) collected in the league. The team moved and became the Louisville Buckeyes in the 1949 season. Kellman slumped to a .254 average that season. He opened 1950 with the Memphis Red Sox, batting a huge .329 average. In addition, he made four consecutive appearances from 1947 to 1950 as a backup third baseman for the West Division team in the East-West All-Star Game.

In 1951 Kellman journeyed to Mexico, where he enjoyed a solid season with the Azules de Veracruz, batting a slash line of .292/.407/.450, which included 10 home runs in 271 at-bats, helping the team to clinch the championship.

After that Kellman returned to the Negro leagues, dividing his playing time with the Memphis Red Sox and Indianapolis Clowns in 1952 and part of 1953, when he came back to Mexico and joined the Tecolotes de Nuevo Laredo for the rest of the year, batting .268 in 79 games.

His most productive season in Mexico came in 1954, when he posted a slash of .357/.502/.608 and 13 home runs for Nuevo Laredo, while driving in 61 runs and scoring 74 times in 73 games, being surpassed by René González in the batting race by a measly .002 points. In addition, Kellman became the first player in Mexican baseball history to hit two grand slams in the same game, accomplishing his feat against the Diablos Rojos de México on May 5, 1954.

Kellman continued contributing with the Tecolotes in 1955, batting .336/.458/.487 in 100 games. He caught and managed for them in part of 1956, then moved to the Leones de Yucatán during the midseason, hitting a combined .297/.444/.429 in the two stints.

He batted 309/.435/.423 for Yucatán in 1957, and then found himself on the move again, this time to the Diablos Rojos late in 1958, during what turned out to be his last season in Mexican baseball. Kellman hit a combined line of .279/.405/.394 in 34 games, while accumulating .309/.440/.456 during his seven seasons in the league.

As was customary in those years, Latin American players as Kellman participated in the winter leagues of their respective countries. As a catcher/manager for the Spur Cola Colonites, Kellman had the distinction of leading his homeland's first team through the inauguration of the Caribbean Series in 1949 in the city of Havana, Cuba. Spur Cola was designated as the road club in the Opening Game against the Indios de Mayagüez of Puerto Rico, which was the first game played in Caribbean Series history. Panama won the contest, 13–9, following an amazing 10-run rally in the seventh inning. The team finished third with a 2–4 record.

Kellman led back Spur Cola to the Series in its 1951 edition. The team ended 1–5 in last place. After that, he was added as a reinforcement of the Carta Vieja Yankees in 1952 and the Chesterfield Smokers in 1953, while managing his Cerveza Balboa champion team to a second-place finish (3–3) behind Cuba's Tigres de Marianao (5–1) in the 1957 Series.

== Later life ==
Kellman retired with a career average of .297 in the Panamanian league and batted .205 (9-for-44) in five Caribbean Series, while tying with teammate Sam Bankhead and Cuba's Chuck Connors for the most stolen bases with four during the inaugural tournament.

His early efforts would enable future generations of fellow countrymen to follow him, including Humberto Robinson, the first Panamanian-born big leaguer, as well as Rod Carew, Webbo Clarke, Héctor López, Ben Oglivie, Mariano Rivera, Carlos Ruiz, Manny Sanguillén and Pat Scantlebury, among many others.

Kellman later became a long time resident of Miami, Florida, where he died in 1981 at the age of 57.
