= 1951 Caribbean Series =

1951 baseball tournament

Tournament details
- Country: Venezuela
- City: Caracas
- Venue: 1 (in 1 host city)
- Dates: 22–26 February
- Teams: 4

Final positions
- Champions: (Puerto Rico) Cangrejeros de Santurce (1st title)
- Runners-up: (Cuba) Leones del Habana

Awards
- MVP: (Puerto Rico) Luis Olmo

The third edition of the Caribbean Series (Serie del Caribe) was played in 1951. The Series inauguration on February 21 was delayed due to heavy rain and it was held from February 22 through February 26, including two double-headers on February 25, featuring the champion baseball teams of Cuba, Leones del Habana; Panama, Spur Cola Colonites; Puerto Rico, Cangrejeros de Santurce, and Venezuela, Navegantes del Magallanes. The format consisted of 12 games, each team facing the other teams twice, and the games were played at Cervecería Caracas Stadium in Caracas, Venezuela.

== Summary ==
The Puerto Rico team won the Series with a 5-1 record and was managed by George Scales. Their only defeat came from Cuba. The team was led by OF Luis Rodríguez Olmo, who was named Most Valuable Player after hitting .423 (11-for-26) with three home runs and nine RBI. Other contributions came from pitchers Pantalones Santiago (two complete-game wins), Rubén Gómez (two wins, one save), 1B George Crowe (.333, one grand slam, 7 RBI), and SS Stan Breard (.423, seven runs, 4 doubles, 8 RBI). Also in the Puerto Rican roster were Jim Gilliam (2B), Buster Clarkson (3B), Bob Thurman (OF) and Willard Brown (OF).

Managed by Mike González, Cuba finished in second place with a 4-2 mark. 1B Lorenzo Cabrera led the Series hitters with an astronomical .619 batting average (13-for-23), while the pitching staff was led by Adrián Zabala (2-0), Hoyt Wilhelm (1-1) and Bill Ayers (1 win, 1 save). Also included in the roster were Sandy Amorós (OF), Pedro Formental (OF), Bert Haas (3B), Spider Jorgensen (2B), Ed Mierkowicz (OF), Jiquí Moreno (P) and Carlos Pascual (P).

Venezuela was managed by Lázaro Salazar and finished 2-4, with both victories over Panama. The team was led by 1B René González, who hit .316 (6-for-19), including two doubles, two home runs and a Series-leading 11 RBI. Pitcher José Bracho posted a 1-0 record and a 0.71 earned run average in 12 2/3 innings pitched, helping himself with the bat while hitting .500 (3-for-6) with a double, one run and four RBIs. Other significant players in the roster included Luis García (3B), Vidal López (LF), Jim Pendleton (SS), Chucho Ramos (1B) and Ken Staples (C), as well as pitchers Frank Biscan, Julio Bracho, Alex Carrasquel and Clem Labine.

Panama ended with a 1-5 mark and was managed by catcher León Kellman. The team's only victory came behind a strong pitching effort from starter Connie Johnson over the Cuban team, while 1B Archie Ware paced the offense in average (.348), hits (8) and RBI (4).

== Participating teams ==
Team	Manager
(Puerto Rico) Cangrejeros de Santurce	(United States) George Scales
(Cuba) Leones del Habana	(Cuba) Mike González
(Venezuela) Navegantes del Magallanes	(Cuba) Lázaro Salazar
(Panama) Spur Cola Colonites	(Panama) León Kellman

== Final standings ==
Pos	Team	Pld	W	L	RF	RA	RD	PCT	GB
1	(Puerto Rico) Cangrejeros de Santurce	6	5	1	46	20	+26	.833	—
2	(Cuba) Leones del Habana	6	4	2	25	35	−10	.667	1
3	(Venezuela) Navegantes del Magallanes (H)	6	2	4	40	34	+6	.333	3
4	(Panama) Spur Cola Colonites	6	1	5	21	43	−22	.167	4

Source: CBPC
(H) Hosts

=== Scoreboards ===
==== Game 1, February 22 ====
Team	1	2	3	4	5	6	7	8	9	R	H	E
Puerto Rico	0	0	1	0	0	2	4	6	0	13	18	0
Cuba	1	0	0	0	0	0	0	0	0	1	9	1
WP: José Santiago (1-0) LP: Hoyt Wilhelm (0-1)

==== Game 2, February 22 ====
Team	1	2	3	4	5	6	7	8	9	R	H	E
Panama	0	0	0	0	1	1	0	0	0	2	5	2
Venezuela	0	0	0	0	4	3	3	0	x	10	8	2
WP: Clem Labine (1-0) LP: Webbo Clarke (0-1); Home runs: PAN: None; VEN: René González (1)

==== Game 3, February 23 ====
Team	1	2	3	4	5	6	7	8	9	R	H	E
Cuba	0	0	1	0	0	0	0	0	1	2	8	4
Panama	3	0	0	2	5	0	2	0	x	12	16	1
WP: Connie Johnson (1-0) LP: Eddie Yuhas (0-1); Home runs: CUB: Gilberto Valdivia (1); PAN: None

==== Game 4, February 23 ====
Team	1	2	3	4	5	6	7	8	9	R	H	E
Puerto Rico	0	0	1	0	5	0	0	0	2	8	5	3
Venezuela	0	0	0	3	1	0	0	1	2	7	11	2
WP: Roberto Vargas (1-0) LP: Frank Biscan (0-1) Sv: Rubén Gómez (1); Home runs: PUR: George Crowe (1); VEN: René González (2)

==== Game 5, February 24 ====
Team	1	2	3	4	5	6	7	8	9	R	H	E
Panama	0	0	0	2	0	0	1	0	0	3	7	3
Puerto Rico	2	1	0	0	0	0	0	0	1	4	8	3
WP: Rubén Gómez (1-0) LP: Pat Scantlebury (0-1)

==== Game 6, February 24 ====
Team	1	2	3	4	5	6	7	8	9	R	H	E
Cuba	0	0	0	0	3	0	2	1	3	9	10	0
Venezuela	0	0	0	0	0	1	0	0	0	1	9	2
WP: Bill Ayers (1-0) LP: Alex Carrasquel (0-1); Home runs: CUB: Pedro Formental (1); VEN: Luis García (1)

==== Game 7, February 25 ====
Team	1	2	3	4	5	6	7	8	9	R	H	E
Cuba	4	0	0	0	0	0	0	0	0	4	7	0
Puerto Rico	1	0	0	0	0	1	1	0	0	3	10	1
WP: Adrián Zabala (1-0) LP: Mike Clark (0-1)

==== Game 8, February 25 ====
Team	1	2	3	4	5	6	7	8	9	R	H	E
Venezuela	0	4	3	0	0	4	2	0	0	13	14	3
Panama	0	0	0	0	0	0	0	2	0	2	5	2
WP: José Bracho (1-0) LP: Gentry Jessup (0-1); Home runs: VEN: Eddie Knoblauch (1); PAN: None; Notes: Bracho hurled a complete game and went 3-for-5 with a double, driving in four runs while scoring one more.

==== Game 9, February 25 ====
Team	1	2	3	4	5	6	7	8	9	R	H	E
Panama	0	0	0	0	0	0	1	0	0	1	4	0
Cuba	0	1	0	0	0	1	0	0	x	2	7	2
WP: Hoyt Wilhelm (1-1) LP: Connie Johnson (1-1); Home runs: PAN: None; CUB: Spider Jorgensen (1)

==== Game 10, February 25 ====
Team	1	2	3	4	5	6	7	8	9	R	H	E
Venezuela	1	0	0	4	0	0	0	0	0	4	6	2
Puerto Rico	0	0	3	0	0	0	2	1	x	6	9	0
WP: José Santiago (2-0) LP: Clem Labine (1-1)

==== Game 11, February 26 ====
Team	1	2	3	4	5	6	7	8	9	R	H	E
Puerto Rico	3	0	2	3	0	4	0	x	x	12	8	0
Panama	0	0	1	0	0	0	0	x	x	1	6	2
WP: Rubén Gómez (2-0) LP: Webbo Clarke (0-2); Home runs: PUR: None; PAN: Luis Rodríguez Olmo 2 (3), Buster Clarkson (1), Willard Brown (1)

==== Game 12, February 26 ====
Team	1	2	3	4	5	6	7	8	9	R	H	E
Venezuela	0	0	1	0	0	4	0	x	x	5	6	1
Cuba	3	0	0	0	1	3	x	x	x	7	9	0
WP: Adrián Zabala (2-0) LP: José Bracho (1-1) Sv: Bill Ayers (1)

== Statistics leaders ==
Statistic	Player	Team	Total
Batting average	(Cuba) Lorenzo Cabrera	(Cuba) Leones del Habana	.615
Home runs	(Puerto Rico) Luis Olmo	(Puerto Rico) Cangrejeros de Santurce	3
Runs batted in	(Cuba) René González	(Venezuela) Navegantes del Magallanes	11
Runs	(Canada) Stan Breard	(Puerto Rico) Cangrejeros de Santurce	8
Hits	(Cuba) Lorenzo Cabrera	(Cuba) Leones del Habana	13
Doubles	(Canada) Stan Breard	(Puerto Rico) Cangrejeros de Santurce	4
Triples	(Cuba) Sandy Amorós	(Cuba) Leones del Habana	1
Triples	(United States) Jim Gilliam	(Puerto Rico) Cangrejeros de Santurce	1
Triples	(United States) Bob Thurman	(Puerto Rico) Cangrejeros de Santurce	1
Stolen bases	(United States) Charles Douglas	(Panama) Spur Cola Colonites	3
Wins	(Puerto Rico) Rubén Gómez	(Puerto Rico) Cangrejeros de Santurce	2
Wins	(Puerto Rico) José Santiago	(Puerto Rico) Cangrejeros de Santurce	2
Wins	(Cuba) Adrián Zabala	(Cuba) Leones del Habana	2

== Awards ==
Tournament Awards
Award	Player	Team
MVP	(Puerto Rico) Luis Olmo	(Puerto Rico) Cangrejeros de Santurce
Best manager	(United States) George Scales	(Puerto Rico) Cangrejeros de Santurce

All Star Team
Position	Player	Team
First base	(Cuba) Lorenzo Cabrera	(Cuba) Leones del Habana
Second base	(United States) Spook Jacobs	(Panama) Spur Cola Colonites
Third base	(United States) Jimmy Dicks	(Venezuela) Navegantes del Magallanes
Shortstop	(Canada) Stan Breard	(Puerto Rico) Cangrejeros de Santurce
Left field	(Cuba) Pedro Formental	(Cuba) Leones del Habana
Center field	(Puerto Rico) Luis Olmo	(Puerto Rico) Cangrejeros de Santurce
Right field	(United States) Bob Thurman	(Puerto Rico) Cangrejeros de Santurce
Catcher	(Dominican Republic) Güigüí Lucas	(Puerto Rico) Cangrejeros de Santurce
Pitcher	(Puerto Rico) José Santiago	(Puerto Rico) Cangrejeros de Santurce

== See also ==
- Ballplayers who have played in the Series

== Sources ==
- Antero Núñez, José. Series del Caribe. Jefferson, Caracas, Venezuela: Impresos Urbina, C.A., 1987.
- Gutiérrez, Daniel. Enciclopedia del Béisbol en Venezuela – 1895-2006 . Caracas, Venezuela: Impresión Arte, C.A., 2007.
