= 1986 Caribbean Series =

1986 baseball tournament

The twenty-eighth edition of the Caribbean Series (Serie del Caribe) was played in 1986. It was held from February 4 through February 9 with the baseball champion teams of the Dominican Republic, Águilas Cibaeñas; Mexico, Águilas de Mexicali; Puerto Rico, Indios de Mayagüez, and Venezuela, Tiburones de la Guaira. The format consisted of 12 games, each team facing the other teams twice. The games were played at Estadio Luis Aparicio El Grande in Maracaibo, Venezuela.

== Summary ==
Ten years after their first Caribbean Series title, the Mexican club won again under the guide of veteran Cananea Reyes. Mexicali made history by winning three of four games in its last at-bat, two of them against the Dominican Republic.

Mexico was shut out twice in its first three games, but after four contests all four teams were tied at 2–2 for the first time in Series history. Mexicali finished strong and defeated the Dominican Republic and Puerto Rico to win the title, after host Venezuela was stopped by the Dominicans in the final contest of the tournament. Venezuela had crushed Mexico, 11–0, in their first confrontation, but the Mexicans took revenge in their second matchup with a 14–0 thumping. The other three victories of Mexicali were by one run difference.

Pitchers Jim Leopold and Jaime Orozco took two victories apiece, while the offensive support came from C Francisco Estrada, SS Houston Jiménez and CF John Kruk. The inspired Mexican club also included DH Nelson Barrera, 1B Lorenzo Bundy, RF Roy Johnson, 2B Juan Navarrete, and Ps Salomé Barojas and Sid Monge, among others. In addition, Cananea Reyes joined Cuban skipper Nap Reyes as the only managers to win two Series titles.

The clubs from the Dominican Republic and Venezuela tied for second place with 3–3 records.

The Dominican Republic's Águilas, managed by Winston Llenas, were a favorite to grasp the Series trophy, as the team was headed by players such as C Tony Peña, 2B Juan Samuel, 3B Domingo Ramos, SS Alfredo Griffin, LF Miguel Diloné, 1B Rufino Linares and CF Luis Polonia. The Águilas outscored their rivals, 36 to 30, but also topped the tournament with 15 errors. Eric Plunk, who posted a 1–0 record and a 3.21 ERA in two starts, was a bright spot in a pitching staff that included José Bautista, Ravelo Manzanillo, Pascual Pérez and Bob Patterson.

The Venezuelan Tiburones, managed by José Martínez, wasted home field advantage and was the only team outscored, 34 to 27. 1B Andrés Galarraga hit .407 and slugged .703, driving in five runs while leading the batters in home runs (2) and doubles (2). RF Tony Armas batted .300 with one homer and three RBI, and was very solid at defense. Starters Ubaldo Heredia (1-0, 0.00 ERA), Bryan Clark (1-0, 0.00 ERA) and Odell Jones (1-0, 3.60 ERA) combined for the three victories of the team, receiving some strong bullpen support from Luis Aponte (two saves, 0.00, 5.0 IP), Wilfredo Flores (0.00, 6 2/3 IP) and Luis Sánchez (1.00 ERA, 3.0 IP). Other players in the roster included P Bill Mooneyham, C Tobias Hernández, and IFs Carlos Martínez, Gustavo Polidor, Al Pedrique and Argenis Salazar.

Mayagüez of Puerto Rico was managed by Nick Leyva and finished last with a 2–4 record. The team scored a second-best 31 runs, but lost two one-run games. 3B Randy Ready went 14-for-30 and captured both the batting title (.467) and the RBI lead (7), winning Series Most Valuable Player honors. His 14 hits tied a tournament record, which was set by Pedro Formental in the 1953 Series. Another highlight came from Luis DeLeón, who hurled a two-hit, complete game shutout against the eventual champions. Among the other roster members were Ps Luis Aquino, Edwin Correa, Bill Earley, José Guzmán, Jesús Hernáiz, Dale Mohorcic, Ray Searage and Candy Sierra; C Angel Rodríguez; DH Luis Quiñones; IFs Wally Joyner, Willie Lozado, Al Newman and José Oquendo, as well as OFs Bobby Bonilla, John Cangelosi and Henry Cotto.

== Final standings ==
| Country | Club | W | L | W/L % | GB | Managers |
| Mexico | Águilas de Mexicali | 4 | 2 | .667 | – | Cananea Reyes |
| Venezuela | Tiburones de la Guaira | 3 | 3 | .500 | 1.0 | José Martínez |
| Dominican Republic | Águilas Cibaeñas | 3 | 3 | .500 | 1.0 | Winston Llenas |
| Puerto Rico | Indios de Mayagüez | 2 | 4 | .333 | 2.0 | Nick Leyva |

Individual leaders
| Player/Club | Statistic |
| Randy Ready / PUR | Batting average | .467 |
| Andrés Galarraga / VEN | Home runs | 2 |
| Randy Ready / PUR | Runs batted in | 7 |
| Jim Leopold / MEX; Jaime Orozco / MEX | Wins | 2 |
Awards
| Randy Ready / PUR | Most Valuable Player |
| Cananea Reyes / MEX | Manager |

All-Star Team
| Name/Club | Position |
| Tony Peña / DOM | catcher |
| Andrés Galarraga / VEN | first baseman |
| Juan Navarrete / MEX | second baseman |
| Randy Ready / PUR | third baseman |
| José Oquendo / PUR | shortstop |
| José Leiva / VEN | left fielder |
| John Cangelosi / PUR | center fielder |
| Roy Johnson / MEX | right fielder |
| Jesús Alfaro / VEN | designated hitter |
| Jaime Orozco / MEX | pitcher |
| Cananea Reyes / MEX | manager |

=== Scoreboards ===
==== Game 1, February 4 ====
| Team | 1 | 2 | 3 | 4 | 5 | 6 | 7 | 8 | 9 | 10 | 11 | 12 | R | H | E |
|---|---|---|---|---|---|---|---|---|---|---|---|---|---|---|---|
| Dominican Republic | 0 | 0 | 0 | 0 | 0 | 0 | 1 | 6 | 0 | 0 | 0 | 3 | 10 | 20 | 4 |
| Puerto Rico | 2 | 3 | 1 | 0 | 1 | 0 | 0 | 0 | 0 | 0 | 0 | 0 | 7 | 14 | 0 |
WP: Andy Araujo (1-0) LP: Jesús Hernaiz (0-1)

==== Game 2, February 4 ====
| Team | 1 | 2 | 3 | 4 | 5 | 6 | 7 | 8 | 9 | R | H | E |
|---|---|---|---|---|---|---|---|---|---|---|---|---|
| Venezuela | 0 | 0 | 3 | 1 | 1 | 3 | 3 | 0 | 0 | 11 | 12 | 1 |
| Mexico | 0 | 0 | 0 | 0 | 0 | 0 | 0 | 0 | 0 | 0 | 4 | 2 |
WP: Ubaldo Heredia (1-0) LP: Alfonso Pulido (0-1); Home runs: VEN: Andrés Galarraga (1); MEX: None; Notes: Heredia (7.0 IP), Luis Sánchez (1.0) and Luis Aponte (1.0) combined for the shutout.

==== Game 3, February 5 ====
| Team | 1 | 2 | 3 | 4 | 5 | 6 | 7 | 8 | 9 | 10 | 11 | R | H | E |
|---|---|---|---|---|---|---|---|---|---|---|---|---|---|---|
| Mexico | 0 | 0 | 0 | 0 | 0 | 2 | 0 | 0 | 0 | 0 | 1 | 3 | 12 | 1 |
| Dominican Republic | 0 | 1 | 1 | 0 | 0 | 0 | 0 | 0 | 0 | 0 | 0 | 2 | 8 | 4 |
WP: Jim Leopold (1-0) LP: Jim Walker (0-1); Notes: Nelson Barrera drove in the winning run on a squeeze play in the top of the 11th inning.

==== Game 4, February 5 ====
| Team | 1 | 2 | 3 | 4 | 5 | 6 | 7 | 8 | 9 | R | H | E |
|---|---|---|---|---|---|---|---|---|---|---|---|---|
| Puerto Rico | 1 | 1 | 1 | 0 | 0 | 2 | 0 | 0 | 0 | 5 | 7 | 1 |
| Venezuela | 0 | 0 | 0 | 0 | 0 | 1 | 0 | 0 | 0 | 1 | 9 | 3 |
WP: José Guzmán (1-0) LP: Bill Mooneyham (1-0) Sv: Luis Aquino (1)

==== Game 5, February 6 ====
| Team | 1 | 2 | 3 | 4 | 5 | 6 | 7 | 8 | 9 | R | H | E |
|---|---|---|---|---|---|---|---|---|---|---|---|---|
| Puerto Rico | 0 | 0 | 0 | 0 | 1 | 0 | 1 | 4 | 0 | 6 | 10 | 1 |
| Mexico | 0 | 0 | 0 | 0 | 0 | 0 | 0 | 0 | 0 | 0 | 3 | 1 |
WP: Luis DeLeón (1-0) LP: Luis Trinidad Castillo (0-1); Notes: DeLeón allowed just two singles in his complete game shutout.

==== Game 6, February 6 ====
| Team | 1 | 2 | 3 | 4 | 5 | 6 | 7 | 8 | 9 | R | H | E |
|---|---|---|---|---|---|---|---|---|---|---|---|---|
| Venezuela | 1 | 0 | 0 | 0 | 0 | 0 | 0 | 0 | 1 | 2 | 9 | 0 |
| Dominican Republic | 0 | 0 | 0 | 0 | 0 | 0 | 0 | 0 | 0 | 0 | 6 | 0 |
WP: Bryan Clark (1-0) LP: José Bautista (0-1) Sv: Luis Aponte (1); Notes: Clark (7 innings) and Aponte (2 innings) combined for the shutout.

==== Game 7, February 7 ====
| Team | 1 | 2 | 3 | 4 | 5 | 6 | 7 | 8 | 9 | R | H | E |
|---|---|---|---|---|---|---|---|---|---|---|---|---|
| Puerto Rico | 0 | 0 | 0 | 0 | 1 | 0 | 0 | 0 | 4 | 5 | 7 | 4 |
| Dominican Republic | 0 | 0 | 0 | 1 | 0 | 0 | 5 | 0 | x | 6 | 8 | 1 |
WP: Bob Patterson (1-0) LP: Bill Earley (0-1) Sv: Gene Walker (1)

==== Game 8, February 7 ====
| Team | 1 | 2 | 3 | 4 | 5 | 6 | 7 | 8 | 9 | R | H | E |
|---|---|---|---|---|---|---|---|---|---|---|---|---|
| Mexico | 3 | 0 | 0 | 2 | 6 | 3 | 0 | 0 | 0 | 14 | 14 | 1 |
| Venezuela | 0 | 0 | 0 | 0 | 0 | 0 | 0 | 0 | 0 | 0 | 6 | 4 |
WP: Jaime Orozco (1-0) LP: Oswaldo Peraza (0-1); Notes: Orozco scattered six singles while striking out 10 and walking two in a complete-game shutout effort.

==== Game 9, February 8 ====
| Team | 1 | 2 | 3 | 4 | 5 | 6 | 7 | 8 | 9 | R | H | E |
|---|---|---|---|---|---|---|---|---|---|---|---|---|
| Dominican Republic | 0 | 0 | 4 | 0 | 0 | 0 | 3 | 0 | 0 | 7 | 11 | 3 |
| Mexico | 3 | 1 | 1 | 0 | 0 | 0 | 2 | 0 | 1 | 8 | 9 | 4 |
WP: Jim Leopold (2-0) LP: Jim Walker (0-2)

==== Game 10, February 8 ====
| Team | 1 | 2 | 3 | 4 | 5 | 6 | 7 | 8 | 9 | R | H | E |
|---|---|---|---|---|---|---|---|---|---|---|---|---|
| Venezuela | 0 | 3 | 2 | 0 | 0 | 1 | 2 | 0 | 0 | 8 | 14 | 2 |
| Puerto Rico | 0 | 0 | 0 | 2 | 1 | 0 | 1 | 1 | 0 | 5 | 8 | 2 |
WP: Odell Jones (1-0) LP: Candy Sierra (0-1) Sv: Luis Aponte (2); Home runs: VEN: Tony Armas (1), Andrés Galarraga (2), Raul Tovar (1); PUR: None

==== Game 11, February 9 ====
| Team | 1 | 2 | 3 | 4 | 5 | 6 | 7 | 8 | 9 | 10 | R | H | E |
|---|---|---|---|---|---|---|---|---|---|---|---|---|---|
| Mexico | 0 | 0 | 1 | 0 | 0 | 0 | 2 | 1 | 0 | 1 | 5 | 13 | 0 |
| Puerto Rico | 2 | 0 | 0 | 0 | 0 | 1 | 0 | 0 | 1 | 0 | 4 | 10 | 2 |
WP: Jaime Orozco (2-0) LP: Luis Aquino (0-1); Home runs: MEX: Nelson Barrera (1); PUR: None; Notes: Orozco earned the win in relief duty while Francisco Estrada singled the winning run in the top of the 10th inning.

==== Game 12, February 9 ====
| Team | 1 | 2 | 3 | 4 | 5 | 6 | 7 | 8 | 9 | R | H | E |
|---|---|---|---|---|---|---|---|---|---|---|---|---|
| Dominican Republic | 0 | 3 | 8 | 0 | 0 | 0 | 0 | 0 | 0 | 11 | 9 | 3 |
| Venezuela | 2 | 0 | 0 | 0 | 1 | 0 | 1 | 1 | 0 | 5 | 16 | 1 |
WP: Eric Plunk (1-0) LP: Rafael Cepeda (0-1)

== Sources ==
- Antero Núñez, José (1987). Series del Caribe. Jefferson, Caracas, Venezuela. Impresos Urbina, C.A.
- Gutiérrez, Daniel (2007). Enciclopedia del Béisbol en Venezuela – 1895-2006 . Caracas, Venezuela. Impresión Arte, C.A.
- EspnDeportes.com – Campeones de México en Series del Caribe
