= 1953 Caribbean Series =

Regional baseball tournament

Tournament details
- Country: Cuba
- City: Havana
- Venue(s): 1 (in 1 host city)
- Dates: 20–25 February
- Teams: 4

Final positions
- Champions: (Puerto Rico) Cangrejeros de Santurce (2nd title)
- Runners-up: (Cuba) Leones del Habana

Awards
- MVP: (United States) Willard Brown

The fifth edition of the Caribbean Series (Serie del Caribe) was played in 1953. It was held from February 20 through February 25, featuring the champion baseball teams of Cuba, Leones de la Habana; Panama, Chesterfield Smokers; Puerto Rico, Cangrejeros de Santurce, and Venezuela, Leones del Caracas. The format consisted of 12 games, each team facing the other teams twice. The games were played at Estadio del Cerro in Havana, the Cuban capital.

== Summary ==
Puerto Rico finished undefeated and won the title by going 6-0, outscoring their opponents 50 to 23. The Santurce club, who hit a collective .367 batting average and committed only two errors, was led by right fielder and Series MVP Willard Brown, who enjoyed one of the most productive offensive in tournament's history. Brown led the hitters in home runs (4), RBI (13), runs (8), doubles (3) and SLG (1,042), while hitting .417 (10-for-24). The pitching staff was anchored by Bobo Holloman (2-0), Cot Deal (2-0, one save) and Rubén Gómez (1-0, one save). In addition to Brown, shortstop/manager Buster Clarkson (.467 BA), 2B Jim Gilliam (.545, two HR), RF Bob Thurman (.474, .684 SLG) and 3B Víctor Pellot Power (.385, one HR) also contributed to the attack. Other players for Puerto Rico included CF Luis (Canena) Márquez, P José (Pantalones) Santiago and catchers Joe Montalvo and Valmy Thomas.

The Cuban team, who many considered a favorite before the start of the event, wasted home-field advantage and a solid lineup managed by Mike González to end in second place with a 3-3 record. The Habana team was led by RF Pedro Formental, who posted a .560 mark to clinch the batting title. Other contributions came from 1B Bert Haas (.360, two HR, .600 SLG) and 3B Lou Klein (.316, one HR, .579 SLG). Pitchers Bob Alexander and Mario Picone collected wins, while Carlos (Patato) Pascual dropped two of three decisions. Cuba included LF Sandy Amorós, 2B Spider Jorgensen, CF Bob Usher, P Adrián Zabala, and catchers Andrés Fleitas and Dick Rand, between others.

Panama was managed by Stanford Graham and finished 2-4 in third place. The Panamanian squad got fine work of CF Nat Peeples (.400, .733 SLG), as well as pitchers Humberto Robinson (1-0) and Pat Scantlebury (1-1, 11 strikeouts in three games). The team also featured players as IFs Frank Austin and Joe Tuminelli, C León Kellman, and OFs Bobby Prescott and Dave Roberts. Collectively, Chesterfield scored the fewest runs (18) and committed the most errors (10) in the Series.

Venezuela, with Martín Dihigo at the helm, finished in last place with a 1-5 record. The Caracas lone victory came from Charlie Bishop, who pitched a one-hit shutout in Game 5. Among others were Ps Jay Heard, Dick Starr, Lenny Yochim and Luis Zuloaga; C Guillermo Vento; IFs Chico Carrasquel, Pompeyo Davalillo, Piper Davis and Hank Schenz, as well as OFs Dalmiro Finol, Lloyd Gearhart, Milt Nielsen and Gale Wade.

== Participating teams ==
Team	Manager
(Puerto Rico) Cangrejeros de Santurce	(United States) Buster Clarkson
(Panama) Chesterfield Smokers	(United States) Stanford Graham
(Venezuela) Leones del Caracas	(Cuba) Martín Dihigo
(Cuba) Leones del Habana	(Cuba) Mike González

== Final standings ==
Pos	Team	Pld	W	L	RF	RA	RD	PCT	GB
1	(Puerto Rico) Cangrejeros de Santurce	6	6	0	50	23	+27	1.000	—
2	(Cuba) Leones del Habana (H)	6	3	3	33	26	+7	.500	3
3	(Panama) Chesterfield Smokers	6	2	4	18	39	−21	.333	4
4	(Venezuela) Leones del Caracas	6	1	5	22	35	−13	.167	5

Source: CBPC
(H) Hosts

=== Scoreboards ===
==== Game 1, February 20 ====
Team	1	2	3	4	5	6	7	R	H	E
Panama	0	1	0	1	0	2	2	6	7	0
Puerto Rico	1	4	3	4	3	0	0	15	14	0
WP: Rubén Gómez (1-0) LP: Hisel Patrick (0-1); Home runs: PAN: None; PUR: Victor Pellot (1), Rubén Gómez (1) * Game was called after seven innings due to time limit.

==== Game 2, February 20 ====
Team	1	2	3	4	5	6	7	8	9	R	H	E
Venezuela	1	0	3	0	3	0	0	0	0	7		1
Cuba	3	0	3	2	2	0	0	0	X	10	12	2
WP: Carlos Pascual (1-0) LP: Lenny Yochim (0-1)

==== Game 3, February 21 ====
Team	1	2	3	4	5	6	7	8	9	R	H	E
Puerto Rico	0	0	2	0	1	4	0	0	0	7	13	0
Venezuela	1	0	0	0	0	0	1	2	0	4	12	1
WP: Bobo Holloman (1-0) LP: Dick Starr (0-1) Sv: Cot Deal (1); Home runs: PUR: Willard Brown (1), Jim Gilliam (1); VEN: Dalmiro Finol (1)

==== Game 4, February 21 ====
Team	1	2	3	4	5	6	7	8	9	R	H	E
Cuba	1	0	0	1	1	0	3	0	0	6	10	1
Panama	0	0	0	0	0	0	1	0	0	1	7	1
WP: Mario Picone (1-0) LP: Pat Scantlebury (0-1); Home runs: CUB: Lou Klein (1); Panama: None

==== Game 5, February 22 ====
Team	1	2	3	4	5	6	7	8	9	R	H	E
Venezuela	0	0	0	2	0	1	0	0	0	3	5	0
Panama	0	0	0	0	0	0	0	0	0	0	1	0
WP: Charlie Bishop (1-0) LP: Peter Nicolis (0-1)

==== Game 6, February 22 ====
Team	1	2	3	4	5	6	7	8	9	R	H	E
Cuba	0	1	0	0	0	0	0	3	1	5	13	0
Puerto Rico	0	2	1	0	0	0	0	0	3	6	12	0
WP: Cot Deal (1-0) LP: Carlos Pascual (1-1); Home runs: CUB: Bert Haas (1); PUR: Willard Brown (2)

==== Game 7, February 23 ====
Team	1	2	3	4	5	6	7	8	9	R	H	E
Puerto Rico	0	0	3	0	0	2	0	0	1	6	13	2
Panama	0	0	0	0	0	0	0	1	2	3	14	1
WP: Cot Deal (2-0) LP: Alberto Osorio (0-1)

==== Game 8, February 23 ====
Team	1	2	3	4	5	6	7	8	9	R	H	E
Cuba	0	0	1	2	3	0	0	0	0	6	14	0
Venezuela	0	0	0	0	2	0	0	0	2	4	5	1
WP: Bob Alexander (1-0) LP: Lenny Yochim (0-2)

==== Game 9, February 24 ====
Team	1	2	3	4	5	6	7	8	9	R	H	E
Venezuela	0	0	0	1	0	0	0	0	1	2	6	2
Puerto Rico	2	1	0	4	0	2	0	0	X	9	13	0
WP: Bobo Holloman (2-0) LP: Jehosie Heard (0-1); Home runs: VEN: None; PUR: Willard Brown (3), Joe Montalvo (1)

==== Game 10, February 24 ====
Team	1	2	3	4	5	6	7	8	9	R	H	E
Panama	2	0	0	0	2	1	0	0	0	5	10	0
Cuba	0	0	2	0	0	0	0	1	0	3	11	0
WP: Humberto Robinson (1-0) LP: Carlos Pascual (1-2) Sv: Pat Scantlebury (1); Home runs: PAN: Bobby Prescott (1); CUB: None

==== Game 11, February 25 ====
Team	1	2	3	4	5	6	7	8	9	R	H	E
Panama	0	0	2	0	0	0	1	0	0	3	6	0
Venezuela	1	0	1	0	0	0	0	0	0	2	8	1
WP: Pat Scantlebury (1-1) LP: José Bracho (0-1); Home runs: PAN: Arthur Peeples (1); VEN: None

==== Game 12, February 25 ====
Team	1	2	3	4	5	6	7	8	9	R	H	E
Puerto Rico	0	0	3	0	0	0	0	1	3	7	16	0
Cuba	0	0	1	0	0	0	0	2	X	3	9	0
WP: Roberto Vargas (0-1) LP: Jocko Thompson (0-1); Home runs: PUR: Jim Gilliam (2), Willard Brown (4); CUB: None

== Statistics leaders ==
Statistic	Player	Team	Total
Batting average	(Cuba) Pedro Formental	(Cuba) Leones del Habana	.560
Home runs	(United States) Willard Brown	(Puerto Rico) Cangrejeros de Santurce	4
Runs batted in	(United States) Willard Brown	(Puerto Rico) Cangrejeros de Santurce	13
Runs	(United States) Willard Brown	(Puerto Rico) Cangrejeros de Santurce	8
Hits	(Cuba) Pedro Formental	(Cuba) Leones del Habana	14
Doubles	(United States) Willard Brown	(Puerto Rico) Cangrejeros de Santurce	3
Triples	(Cuba) Pedro Formental	(Cuba) Leones del Habana	2
Stolen bases	Ten tied		1
Wins	(United States) Bobo Holloman	(Puerto Rico) Cangrejeros de Santurce	2
Earned run average	(United States) Charlie Bishop	(Venezuela) Leones del Caracas	0.00
Strikeouts	(Panama) Pat Scantlebury	(Panama) Chesterfield Smokers	11
Saves	(United States) Cot Deal	(Puerto Rico) Cangrejeros de Santurce	1
Saves	(Panama) Pat Scantlebury	(Panama) Chesterfield Smokers	1
Innings pitched	(United States) Bobo Holloman	(Puerto Rico) Cangrejeros de Santurce	17.0

== Awards ==
Tournament Awards
Award	Player	Team
MVP	(United States) Willard Brown	(Puerto Rico) Cangrejeros de Santurce
Best manager	(United States) Buster Clarkson	(Puerto Rico) Cangrejeros de Santurce

All Star Team
Position	Player	Team
First base	(United States) Bert Haas	(Cuba) Leones del Habana
Second base	(United States) Jim Gilliam	(Puerto Rico) Cangrejeros de Santurce
Third base	(United States) Lou Klein	(Cuba) Leones del Habana
Shortstop	(United States) Buster Clarkson	(Puerto Rico) Cangrejeros de Santurce
Left field	(United States) Willard Brown	(Puerto Rico) Cangrejeros de Santurce
Center field	(United States) Nat Peeples	(Panama) Chesterfield Smokers
Right field	(Cuba) Pedro Formental	(Cuba) Leones del Habana
Catcher	(United States) Joe Montalvo	(Puerto Rico) Cangrejeros de Santurce
Pitcher	(United States) Bobo Holloman	(Puerto Rico) Cangrejeros de Santurce

== See also ==
- Ballplayers who have played in the Series

== Sources ==
- Antero Núñez, José. Series del Caribe. Jefferson, Caracas, Venezuela: Impresos Urbina, C.A., 1987.
- Gutiérrez, Daniel. Enciclopedia del Béisbol en Venezuela – 1895-2006 . Caracas, Venezuela: Impresión Arte, C.A., 2007.
