= Bárbaro Cañizares =

Cuban baseball player (born 1979)

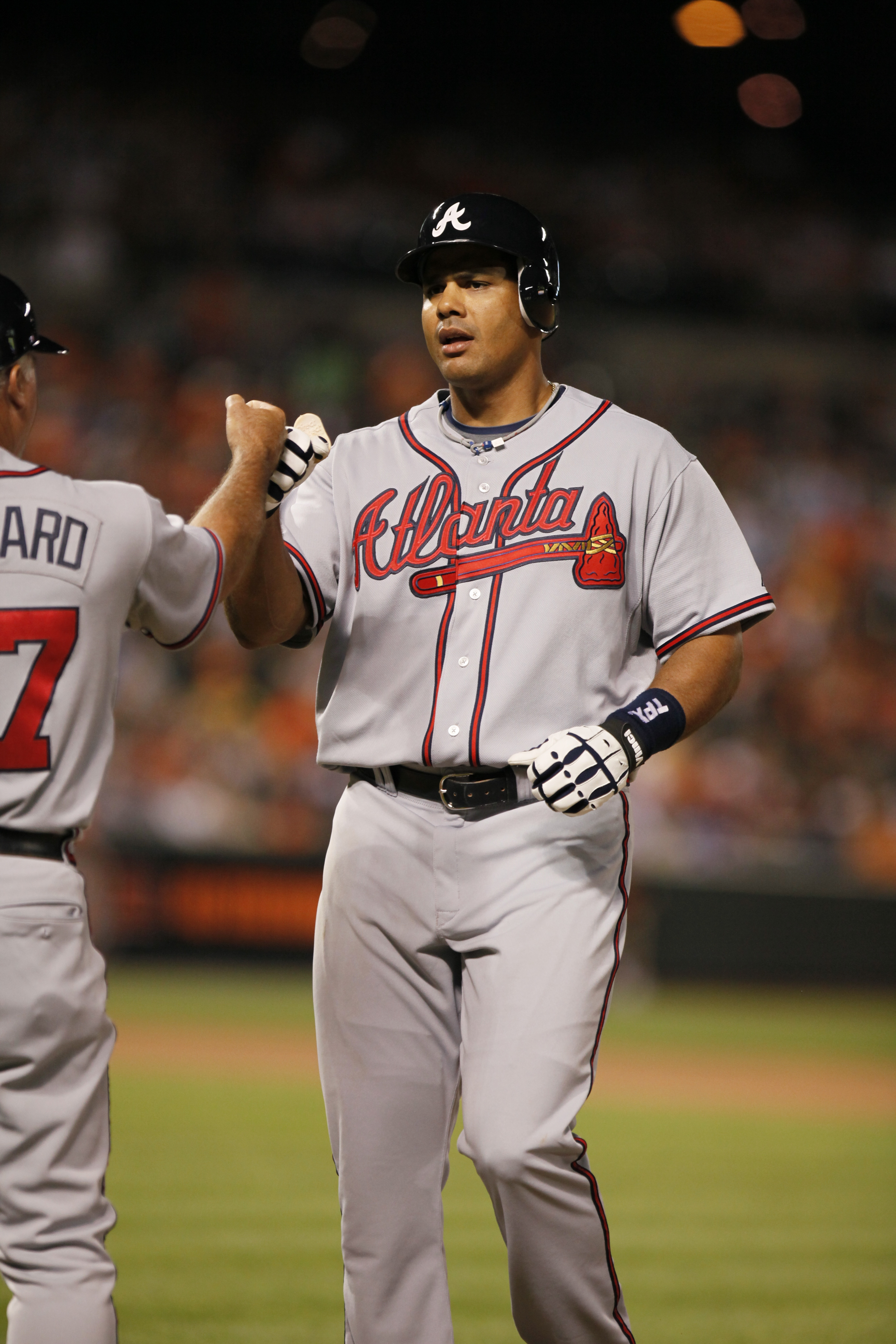
- Cañizares with the Atlanta Braves
- First baseman
- Born: November 21, 1979 (age 46); Havana, Cuba
- Batted: Right Threw: Right

Professional debut
- MLB: June 11, 2009, for the Atlanta Braves
- NPB: June 12, 2014, for the Fukuoka SoftBank Hawks

Last appearance
- MLB: July 31, 2009, for the Atlanta Braves
- NPB: 2016, for the Fukuoka SoftBank Hawks

MLB statistics (through 2009)
- Batting average: .190
- Home runs: 0
- Runs batted in: 0

NPB statistics (through 2016)
- Batting average: .259
- Home runs: 1
- Runs batted in: 8
- Stats at Baseball Reference

Teams
- Atlanta Braves (2009); Fukuoka SoftBank Hawks (2014–2016)

Career highlights and awards
- Mexican League batting champion (2011); 2x Japan Series champion (2014, 2015)
Medals
Men's baseball
Representing Cuba
Intercontinental Cup
Gold medal – first place	2002 Havana	Team

Bárbaro Rafael Cañizares Hernandez (Spanish pronunciation: [kaɲiˈθaɾes]; born November 21, 1979) is a Cuban-American former first baseman. Listed at 6' 3", 230 lb., Cañizares batted and threw right-handed. He was born in Havana.

== Career in Cuba ==
Cañizares played from 1995 through 2003 for the Industriales and Metropolitanos teams of the Cuban National Series. Overall, he posted a batting average of .304 (599-for-1,973) with 47 home runs and 335 runs batted in in 573 games. He guided Industriales together with MLB player Kendrys Morales to the postseason in 2005.

== Minor League Baseball career ==
While playing for the Cuban national team, he sold his jersey to a fan after an international game. Unbeknownst to Cañizares, the fan was a member of the United States Interests Section in Havana. As a result, Cañizares received a lifetime suspension from Cuban baseball.

In February 2004, Cañizares defected from Cuba along with Michel Abreu and Yosandy Ibañez. The three later played professionally together in Nicaraguan baseball. He then signed with the Atlanta Braves on February 4, 2006.

After that, Cañizares has been consistently held in the Minor Leagues, playing for several teams in different countries.

== Major Leagues ==
Cañizares was called up to the Atlanta Braves on June 11, 2009, making his major league debut the same day appearing fourth in the batting order and playing first base.

Canizares played for the Winnipeg Goldeyes of the American Association of Independent Professional Baseball during the 2012 season.

== Mexican baseball ==
Cañizares also played in Mexico, where he earned Mexican Pacific League MVP honors with the Yaquis de Obregón club in two different times. In addition, he captured the Mexican League batting crown in 2011, after hitting a .396 average with the Guerreros de Oaxaca.

=== Tigres de Quintana Roo ===
On April 23, 2017, Cañizares signed with the Tigres de Quintana Roo of the Mexican Baseball League. He was released on May 15, 2017.

=== Algodoneros de Unión Laguna ===
On April 5, 2018, Cañizares signed with the Algodoneros de Unión Laguna of the Mexican Baseball League.

=== Retirement ===
Cañizares retired as an active player following the 2018 season, and stayed in the Mexican League as a hitting coach for the Olmecas de Tabasco.

== Other leagues ==
In between, Cañizares has played with the Winnipeg Goldeyes of the American Association, as well as in Dominican Republic and Venezuela winter ball.

== See also ==
- List of baseball players who defected from Cuba
