= Orlando Sánchez (baseball) =

Puerto Rican baseball player (born 1956)

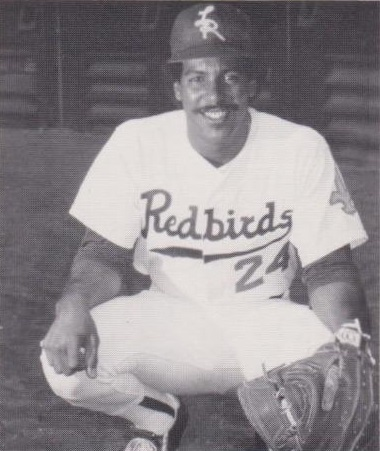
- Catcher
- Born: September 7, 1956 (age 69); Canóvanas, Puerto Rico
- Batted: Left Threw: Right

MLB debut
- May 6, 1981, for the St. Louis Cardinals

Last MLB appearance
- May 25, 1984, for the Baltimore Orioles

MLB statistics
- Batting average: .218
- Home runs: 0
- Runs batted in: 12
- Stats at Baseball Reference

Teams
- St. Louis Cardinals (1981–1983); Kansas City Royals (1984); Baltimore Orioles (1984)

Career highlights and awards
- Mexican League batting champion (1987)

Orlando Sánchez Márquez (born September 7, 1956) is a Puerto Rican former catcher in Major League Baseball. He played all or part of four seasons in the majors, from 1981 through 1984, for the St. Louis Cardinals (1981–83), Kansas City Royals (1984) and Baltimore Orioles (1984). Listed at 6' 1", 195 lb., he batted left-handed and threw right-handed.

In a four-season career, Sánchez posted a .218 batting average (24-for-110) with 11 runs and 12 RBI in 73 games, including three doubles, two triples and one stolen base without home runs.

Following his playing career, Sánchez coached in the minor leagues.

On August 29, 2009, he coached the Mexican League champion Saraperos, when the team defeated the Quintana Roo Tigres 14–1 in the sixth game of the championship series.

== Pro career ==
Orlando Sanchez was signed as an amateur undrafted free agent by the New York Mets. He made his professional debut as a 17 year old for the Marion Mets of the Appalachian League. In the year, Sanchez batted .206 over the course of 23 games. At the end of the 1975 season, Sanchez was released by the Mets, and signed with the Philadelphia Phillies in spring training the following year. Sanchez would spend the next few season playing in the minor league system for the Phillies. It wasn't until 1979 that Sanchez made it as far as Triple A, playing for the Phillies affiliate the Oklahoma City 89ers. Sanchez appeared in a handful of games, and had his best season in 1980, batting .306. However, the power hitting he enjoyed on the lower levels of minor league baseball did not follow him to triple-A. While playing in the Phillies system, he was pressed into service as a pitcher for the Pulaski Phillies. Sanchez surrendered a home run and ended up with a 27.00 E.R.A.

With Philadelphia, Sanchez was stuck without much hope of getting promoted to the big league club, especially since they had multi-time All-star Bob Boone as their starting catcher. When the Rule 5 draft came around the following winter, the Phillies left Sanchez exposed and he was selected by the St. Louis Cardinals. Sanchez made his MLB debut on May 6, 1981, against the Atlanta Braves. He was a late inning defensive replacement for Darrell Porter. He made only one plate appearance, that against Gaylord Perry, and grounded out to second.

Over the course of the next couple of seasons, Sanchez would split his time from being Porter's back-up, to playing in the minors. At the end of the 1983 season, the Cardinals left Sanchez exposed and he was selected by the Kansas City Royals in the Rule 5 draft. He only appeared in 10 games before his contract was purchased by the Baltimore Orioles. Sanchez split the rest of the season between Baltimore and their Triple-A team, the Rochester Red Wings. he appeared in 74 games for Rochester, batting .305 Despite this, Sanchez was released by Baltimore at the end of the season and later signed with the Cleveland Indians and played for their Triple A team in Maine. After appearing in just 12 games for Maine, Sanchez was released. After being cut by Cleveland, Sanchez signed with Puebla Angeles of the Mexican League. Sanchez would play eight more seasons of pro ball in Mexico, before retiring in 1993 after spending the season with the Monterrey Industriales.

== Managerial career ==
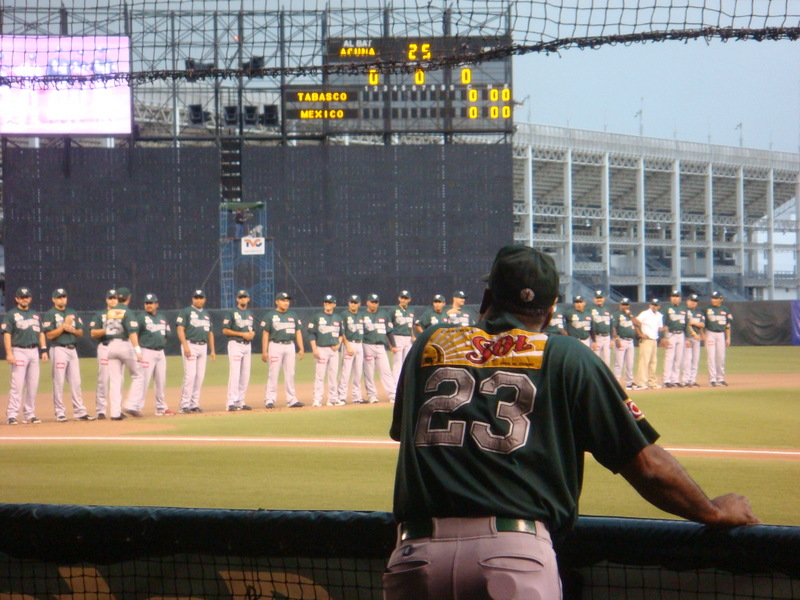
Sánchez managing the Olmecas de Tabasco in 2007.

In 2006, Sánchez was named as the manager for the Vaqueros Laguna. The team finished 50–59. The next season Sánchez was the manager of the Olmecas de Tabasco, whom he led to a record of 56–54. In 2009, he was named the manager of Saraperos de Saltillo, with whom he'd manage the next few seasons. He led the team to a 59–48 record in his first year at the helm. However, in 2011, he had the worst season of his career, and was fired mid-way through the season with a record of 36–50. He was replaced by Noe Muñoz. Over the course of the next two seasons he managed the Acereros de Monclova and Vaqueros Laguna before returning to Saltillo in 2017. He currently has a record of 660 wins and 675 losses in his managerial career.

== See also ==
- List of Major League Baseball players from Puerto Rico
