= Luis Mauricio Suárez =

Mexican baseball player and coach (born 1979)

Pericos de Puebla
- Outfielder / Manager / Coach
- Born: 6 September 1979 (age 47); Mexico City, Mexico
- Bats: Left Throws: Left

LMB statistics
- Batting average: .318
- Home runs: 150
- Runs batted in: 945

Career highlights and awards
- Mexican League Rookie of the Year (1998); Mexican League batting champion (2013)
Medals
Men's baseball
Representing Mexico
Pan American Games
Bronze medal – third place	2007 Rio de Janeiro	Team

Luis Mauricio Suárez Calero (born 6 September 1979) is a Mexican professional baseball manager and former outfielder who currently serves as the hitting coach for the Pericos de Puebla of the Mexican League. Suárez spent all his career in Mexico, playing in the Mexican League (LMB) from 1998 to 2018 and the Mexican Pacific League (LMP) from 1998 to 2014.

Suárez represented Mexico, winning the bronze medal at the 2007 Pan American Games.

== Early life ==
Suárez was born on 6 September 1979 in Mexico City and was raised in Xalapa, Veracruz, where he played youth and amateur baseball.

== Professional career ==
=== Tigres de México / Angelópolis / Quintana Roo ===
Suárez made his professional debut in the Mexican League with the Tigres de México in 1998, making 104 appearances, batting .316 with 51 RBI and five home runs, and earning Rookie of the Year honors. Over the next three seasons, he batted above .300 and became a key player for the team, contributing to the 2000 and 2001 championships.

In 2002, the Tigres left Mexico City and relocated to Puebla, changing its name to Tigres de la Angelópolis. That season, Suárez slashed .303/.336/.471 over 39 games. He continued to hit over .300 in the following seasons, with the exception of 2004, when he posted a .297 batting average.

In 2007, the Tigers moved to Cancún, renaming Tigres de Quintana Roo. That season, Suárez appeared in 92 games, recording 104 hits and 40 RBI, batting .300/.386/.464. In 2008, he slashed .290/.361/.412 with 81 hits and 40 RBI in 89 games. On 23 June 2009, he was traded to the Pericos de Puebla.

=== Pericos de Puebla ===
In his first four seasons with the Pericos, Sánchez batted over .300. In 2013, he slashed .413/.484/.553 with 57 RBI, winning that year's batting title. In 2014, he batted .309/.370/.439 with 46 RBI.

=== Toros de Tijuana ===
In 2015, Suárez was signed by the Toros de Tijuana. In his first season with the team, he appeared in 74 games, hitting .242/.301/.389 with 46 RBI. On 18 April 2016, he was traded to the Pericos de Puebla.

=== Pericos de Puebla (second stint) ===
Suárez played the remainder of the 2016 season with the Pericos, appearing in 65 games and batting .244/.317/.305. He won that year's Serie del Rey, earning his fourth Mexican League championship.

=== Rojos del Águila de Veracruz ===
On 7 March 2017, the Rojos del Águila de Veracruz signed Suárez. In 80 games, he batted .276/.366/.364 with 27 RBI.

=== Tigres de Quintana Roo (second stint) ===
On 1 February 2018, Suárez was traded to the Tigres de Quintana Roo. He appeared in 34 games, posting a .269 batting average and was released by the Tigres on 11 July 2018.

=== Mexican Pacific League ===
Suárez played in the Mexican Pacific League (LMP) for 13 seasons, making his debut in 1998 with the Algodoneros de Guasave, where he remained until 2006. He then played for the Cañeros de Los Mochis from 2007 to 2013. In the 2013–14 season, he split time between the Águilas de Mexicali and the Tomateros de Culiacán, and spent his final campaign, 2014–15, with the Tomateros.

== International career ==
Suárez was part of the Mexican team that won the bronze medal at the 2007 Pan American Games in Rio de Janeiro. He appeared in four games, recording five hits, one double, two runs, one RBI, one home run and a .333 batting average over 17 at bats.

== Coaching career ==
On 1 July 2022, Suárez was appointed as interim manager of the Bravos de León, replacing Karim García. He was later confirmed for the rest of the season, finishing the season last in the South Zone with a 29–61 record, going 9–23 under Suárez. On 4 May 2023, just eleven games into the new season, he was dismissed after posting a 3–8 record; he was replaced by Orlando Merced.

On 28 May 2026, Suárez joined the Pericos de Puebla staff as hitting coach under manager Ramón Orantes.
