= Luis DeLeón =

Puerto Rican baseball player (born 1958)

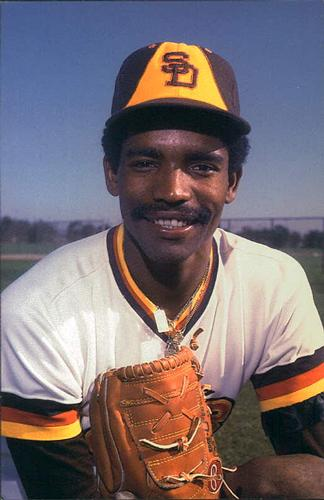
- Pitcher
- Born: August 19, 1958 (age 68); Ponce, Puerto Rico
- Batted: Right Threw: Right

MLB debut
- September 6, 1981, for the St. Louis Cardinals

Last MLB appearance
- May 26, 1989, for the Seattle Mariners

MLB statistics
- Win–loss record: 17–19
- Earned run average: 3.12
- Strikeouts: 248
- Stats at Baseball Reference

Teams
- St. Louis Cardinals (1981); San Diego Padres (1982–1985); Baltimore Orioles (1987); Seattle Mariners (1989)

Member of the Caribbean

Baseball Hall of Fame
- Induction: 2011

Luis Antonio DeLeón Tricoche (born August 19, 1958) is a Puerto Rican former professional baseball pitcher. He pitched all or parts of seven seasons in Major League Baseball (MLB) between 1981 and 1989. He was the co-closer for the San Diego Padres in 1982 and 1983, sharing the role with Gary Lucas.

DeLeón pitched 206 games over the first six seasons of his career, all in relief. He made his first and only start in his last career appearance, which was also his only major league appearance in 1989. Pitching for the Seattle Mariners, he threw four innings, giving up one run on five hits, and did not receive a decision.

DeLeón is the pitcher with the most appearances in Caribbean Series history. Pitching in 12 series throughout his career, he posted a 4–2 record and a 3.09 ERA in 61 innings of work, which includes a two-hit, complete game shutout against Mexico's Aguilas de Mexicali in the 1986 edition. he is also the second player with most seasons in the Puerto Rican Baseball League with 25.

In January 2011, he gained induction into the Caribbean Baseball Hall of Fame. Two months later, he was honored by the Ponce City Hall for his great contribution to baseball in Puerto Rico. He was born in Barrio San Antón in Ponce.

== Personal life ==
"Mambo", as his teammates nicknamed him, is also dubbed "The Millionaire from San Antón".
