= Bobo Holloman =

American baseball player (1923–1987)

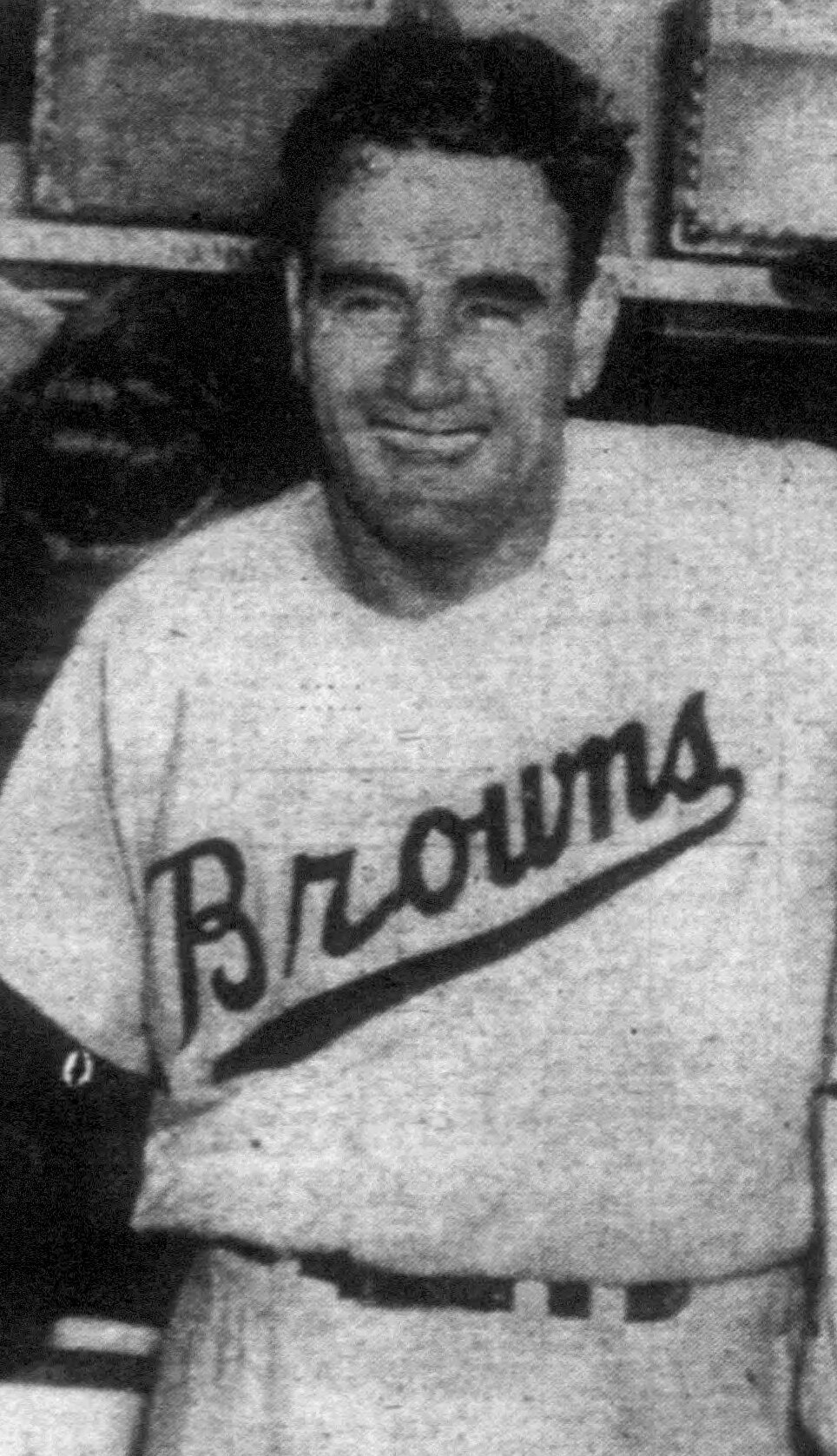
- Holloman after throwing a no-hitter on May 6, 1953.
- Pitcher
- Born: March 7, 1923; Thomaston, Georgia, U.S.
- Died: May 1, 1987 (aged 64); Athens, Georgia, U.S.
- Batted: Right Threw: Right

MLB debut
- April 18, 1953, for the St. Louis Browns

Last MLB appearance
- July 19, 1953, for the St. Louis Browns

MLB statistics
- Win–loss record: 3–7
- Earned run average: 5.23
- Strikeouts: 25
- Stats at Baseball Reference

Teams
- St. Louis Browns (1953)

Career highlights and awards
- Pitched a no-hitter in his first MLB start on May 6, 1953

Alva Lee Holloman (March 7, 1923 – May 1, 1987), nicknamed "Bobo", was an American right-handed pitcher in Major League Baseball (MLB), who played in one season with the American League (AL) St. Louis Browns, in 1953. In 22 career games, he pitched 65 1/3 innings and posted a win–loss record of 3–7, with a 5.23 earned run average (ERA).

Born in Thomaston, Georgia, Holloman served in World War II before starting his professional baseball career. From 1946 to 1952, he gradually rose up through the minor leagues, and got a spring training invitation from the Chicago Cubs in 1950.

After the 1952 season, Holloman was acquired by the St. Louis Browns, who placed him on the major league roster. Holloman made his MLB debut April 18, 1953. In his first start, on May 6, Holloman threw a no-hitter, becoming the first player to do so in his first start since 1900. He pitched in 22 games that season for the Browns, before being sold to a minor league team. Holloman spent the rest of 1953 and 1954 in the minor leagues, before retiring from active play. After retiring, he ran an advertising agency and worked as a scout, until his death in 1987.

== Early life ==
Holloman was born in Thomaston, Georgia, and moved to Athens, Georgia, with his family when he was 17. In Athens, Holloman met Nan Stevens; the two were married on January 24, 1942, and they later had one son. He served as a Seabee in the United States Navy during World War II. After returning from the war, Holloman became an apprentice in a machine shop for the Georgia Railroad in Macon, Georgia. While working there, he played amateur baseball, and did well enough for his colleagues to convince him to try out for the Macon Peaches, the local baseball team. Holloman did so, and he was assigned to the Class D Moultrie Packers, where he began his professional career.

== Minor league career ==
Holloman began his professional baseball career by recording a 20–5 record and a 2.33 ERA for the Packers as a rookie in the Class D Georgia–Florida League in 1946. He played winter baseball in Cuba, then had a record of 18–17 for the Macon Peaches of the Sally League the next year. Holloman started the 1948 season with Macon, then after winning eight games he was promoted to the Nashville Volunteers of the Class AA Southern Association, where he posted seven wins and two losses. While there, Volunteers owner Larry Gilbert gave Holloman the nickname "Bobo", because the pitcher reminded him of Bobo Newsom; the nickname stuck with him the rest of his career.

In 1949, Holloman again spent the season with the Volunteers, posting a record of 17–10 with a 4.46 ERA. After the season ended, the Chicago Cubs signed him and gave him an invitation to spring training. Holloman's outgoing nature clashed with manager Frankie Frisch, who did not appreciate the pitcher's attitude. It was, partially, for this reason that Holloman did not make the major league roster. Holloman split the 1950 season between Nashville and the Shreveport Sports of the Texas League. Combined, he had 13 wins and 13 losses on the year. In 1951, he spent seven games with Nashville, but spent most of the season with the Augusta Tigers of the Sally League, where he posted an 11–9 record and a 3.87 ERA.

The following season, Augusta sold Holloman’s contract to the Syracuse Chiefs of the AAA International League where he posted a 16–7 record and a 2.51 ERA with the team. After the season ended, Holloman played winter baseball in Puerto Rico for the Cangrejeros de Santurce. With Santurce, he had a 15–5 record during the regular season. After the season ended, Holloman participated in the 1953 Caribbean Series, and won two of the six games Santurce played, allowing them to win the title.

== Major leagues and later life ==
In October 1952, Holloman was signed by the St. Louis Browns after they traded Duke Markell and $35,000 to acquire him. Heading into the season, manager Marty Marion was high on him, considering Holloman to be a pitcher who could have won 20 games with Syracuse the year prior, had he not missed time due to an appendectomy.

Holloman made his MLB debut on April 14, in a relief appearance. He made three additional relief appearances afterward, allowing five runs in 5 1/3 innings through his first four games. As a result, Holloman asked Marion for a start, claiming he was better in that role, and if he was just going to be used as a relief pitcher, he should be sold to another team. Marion gave in, and selected Holloman to start a home game on May 6, against the Philadelphia Athletics.

On a rainy night, before a crowd of 2,473 at Sportsman's Park, Holloman threw a no-hitter in his first major league start. He had two hits as a batter, and recorded three strikeouts en route to the 6–0 victory. In his autobiography, Browns owner Bill Veeck called Holloman's no-hitter "the quaintest no-hitter in the history of the game," saying that Holloman’s pitches were "belted" all night, but he was saved by luck and outstanding defense.

Holloman is one of only four pitchers to throw a no-hitter in his first major league start, and the last to do so until Tyler Gilbert did so in 2021. The others were Ted Breitenstein, who accomplished the feat in 1891, and Bumpus Jones, who did so in 1892. However, Breitenstein and Jones threw their no-hitters before the 1893 rule change that moved the pitcher's delivery point back to 60 feet, six inches, from home plate.

The no-hitter cemented Holloman's spot in the starting rotation for the next month. In his next start, against the Athletics, Holloman lasted barely an inning, allowing two runs and three walks, before leaving the game due to a blistered finger. His next win came on May 28 against the Cleveland Indians, but his third win did not come until a month later, against the Boston Red Sox, where he allowed two hits in eight innings of work. Outside the three wins, however, Holloman was ineffective; in 22 games, 10 of them starts, Holloman had a 3–7 record with a 5.23 ERA, 25 strikeouts, and 50 walks. As a result, after his final appearance on July 19, the Browns put him on waivers, and he was sold to the Toronto Maple Leafs.

Holloman finished the 1953 season with Toronto, and had a 4–3 record in 13 games. In 1954, his last professional season, Holloman spent time on five different minor league squads, including former stops Toronto and Augusta, before retiring. The retirement was partially due to a sore arm, the result of pitching too frequently while playing winter ball. After retiring, Holloman became a truck driver and ran an advertising agency, and served as a scout for the Baltimore Orioles. He also turned to drinking for many years, but was able to overcome the addiction. He died on May 1, 1987, at the age of 64 in Athens, Georgia, as the result of a heart attack.

== See also ==
- List of Major League Baseball no-hitters

Achievements
Preceded by Virgil Trucks	No-hitter pitcher May 6, 1953	Succeeded by Jim Wilson
