= Charlie Bishop (baseball) =

American baseball player (1924–1993)

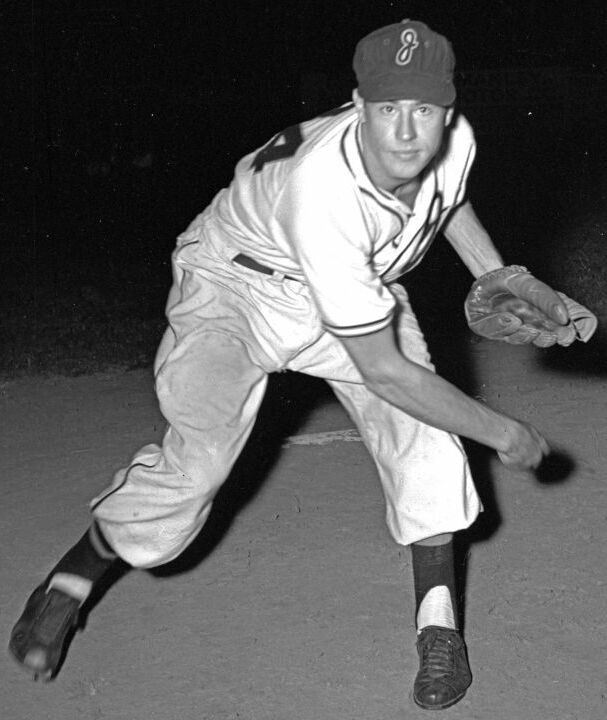
- Bishop with the Jacksonville Tars in 1951
- Pitcher
- Born: January 1, 1924; Atlanta, Georgia, U.S.
- Died: July 5, 1993 (aged 69); Lawrenceville, Georgia, U.S.
- Batted: Right Threw: Right

MLB debut
- August 22, 1952, for the Philadelphia Athletics

Last MLB appearance
- May 7, 1955, for the Kansas City Athletics

MLB statistics
- Win–loss record: 10–22
- Earned run average: 5.33
- Strikeouts: 121
- Stats at Baseball Reference

Teams
- Philadelphia/Kansas City Athletics (1952–1955)

Charles Tuller Bishop (January 1, 1924 – July 5, 1993) was an American professional baseball player. He was a starting pitcher in Major League Baseball who played from 1952 through 1955 for the Philadelphia/Kansas City Athletics. Listed at 6 ft 2 in (1.88 m), 195 lb (88 kg), Bishop batted and threw right-handed.

A hard-throwing fireballer, Bishop never was able to fulfill the potential that he showed in the minors. He initially signed with the St. Louis Cardinals in 1942, and hurled in Class D that season and in 1943 before joining the United States Navy for two years of World War II military service. He resumed his baseball career at age 22 in 1946, then threw a no-hitter in the Class B Piedmont League in 1948. He bounced from the Cardinals to the New York Giants organization before the pitching-poor Philadelphia Athletics acquired his contract prior to the 1952 season.

After winning a dozen games for the Triple-A Ottawa A's, he was purchased by the MLB Athletics in August, and posted a 2–2 record and a poor earned run average (ERA) of 6.46 in six appearances, with five starts, over the final weeks of that American League campaign.

During the 1952–53 winter ball season, Bishop tossed a one-hit shutout in the 1953 Caribbean Series, then he blanked the Boston Red Sox in his first 1953 start. But he went only 2–14 the rest of the way, working in a total of in 39 games, 20 of them starts, and posting another substandard ERA (5.66). The start of the 1954 campaign saw Bishop back in Ottawa, although he returned to Philadelphia in July to make 20 more appearances, with 12 starts. He dropped six of his ten decisions for a last-place team, but lowered his ERA to a career-best 4.41. The once-storied Philadelphia franchise was sold during that offseason and transferred to Kansas City, Missouri. Bishop began 1955 with the relocated Athletics and worked in four games out of the bullpen before being sent back to the minors a final time during the May roster cutdown. His professional baseball career ended later that season.

In all or parts of four MLB seasons, Bishop posted a 10–22 (5.33) record and 121 strikeouts in 69 pitching appearances (37 starts) in 294 innings of work. He compiled six complete games, one shutout and three saves, yielding 307 hits and 168 bases on balls.
