= Bill Earley =

American baseball player (born 1956)

- Pitcher
- Born: January 30, 1956 (age 70); Cincinnati, Ohio, U.S.
- Batted: Right Threw: Left

MLB debut
- September 22, 1986, for the St. Louis Cardinals

Last MLB appearance
- October 4, 1986, for the St. Louis Cardinals

MLB statistics
- Games pitched: 3
- Earned run average: 0.00
- Strikeouts: 2
- Stats at Baseball Reference

Teams
- St. Louis Cardinals (1986)

William Albert Earley (born January 30, 1956) is an American former pitcher in Major League Baseball who played for the St. Louis Cardinals during the 1986 season. Listed at 6' 4", 200 lb., he batted right handed and threw left handed.

== Career ==
Earley was selected originally by the Kansas City Royals in the 11th round of the 1977 MLB draft, but did not sign. He later played from 1978 through 1985 in the Chicago Cubs and Texas Rangers Minor League systems before joining the Louisville Redbirds of the American Association, the Cardinals' highest affiliate team.

In 1986, Earley led the Redbirds with 15 saves (second in the league) in 52 pitching appearances (third in the league), while topping the league with 42 games finished. Overall, his 15 saves were the most by a Cardinal AAA pitcher since Mike Proly, who saved 17 games in 1975.

Besides, Earley played winter ball with the Leones del Caracas and Águilas del Zulia clubs of the Venezuelan League between the 1982 and 1984 seasons, as well as for the Indios de Mayagüez of the Puerto Rico League in the 1986 Caribbean Series.
