= Roy Johnson (1980s outfielder) =

American baseball player (1959–2009)

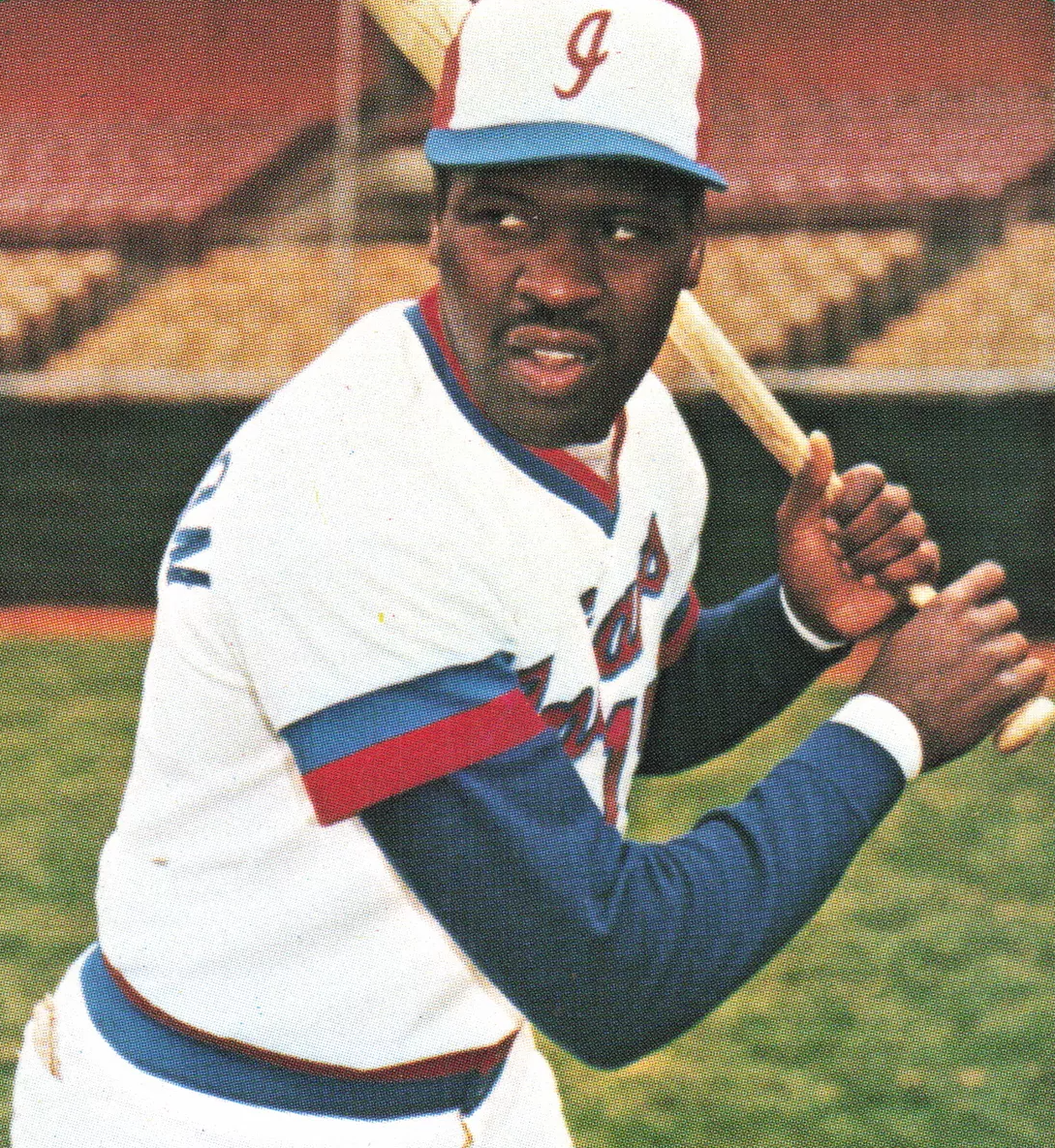
- Johnson with the Indianapolis Indians c. 1984
- Outfielder
- Born: June 27, 1959; Parkin, Arkansas, U.S.
- Died: January 26, 2009 (aged 49); Campeche, Mexico
- Batted: Left Threw: Left

MLB debut
- July 3, 1982, for the Montreal Expos

Last MLB appearance
- April 14, 1985, for the Montreal Expos

MLB statistics
- Batting average: .171
- Home runs: 1
- Runs batted in: 4
- Stats at Baseball Reference

Teams
- Montreal Expos (1982, 1984–1985)

Roy Edward Johnson (June 27, 1959 – January 26, 2009) was an American professional baseball outfielder who appeared in 36 games in Major League Baseball (MLB), mainly as a center fielder, in parts of three seasons for the Montreal Expos (1982, 1984–1985). Listed at 6 feet 4 inches (1.93 m) tall and 205 pounds (93 kg), the native of Parkin, Arkansas, batted and threw left-handed. He was selected by the Expos in the fifth round of the 1980 Major League Baseball draft out of Tennessee State University.

Johnson was a distinguished hitter in the minors, but he was not able to translate it to major league success. He posted a .171 batting average (12-for-70) with four doubles, one home run (a two-run shot off Rich Bordi of the Chicago Cubs on September 12, 1984) and four runs batted in through 79 MLB plate appearances.

In his eight-season minor league career, Johnson hit .291 with 85 homers and 428 RBI in 773 games, including an .829 on-base plus slugging percentage. He hit .361 with 90 RBI and a .561 slugging percentage at Triple-A for the 1982 Wichita Aeros, where he also played in 1983. Dealt to the Oakland Athletics, he was a member of the Triple-A Tacoma Tigers during three seasons (1986–1988), hitting .343 in 1986. He also played for the Piratas de Campeche of the Mexican League and later became their hitting coach.

Johnson died at his San Francisco de Campeche home of a heart attack at the age of 49. He was buried at Jardines del Angel Cemetery, in Campeche. After his death, the Piratas retired Johnson's 39 number.

== Facts ==
- Johnson is regarded as one of the most powerful foreign-born hitters to play in Mexican baseball. Called the "Arkansas Train," he shares the Mexican League record for most home runs in one game with four, and has the Campeche home run record as well (114).
- The 1982 Expos had Andre Dawson, Tim Raines and Warren Cromartie as regulars in the outfield, with Terry Francona and Johnson serving in backup roles.
