= Nat Peeples =

American baseball player

- Outfielder
- Born: June 29, 1926; Memphis, Tennessee
- Died: August 30, 2012 (aged 86); Memphis, Tennessee
- Batted: Right Threw: Right

Negro American League debut
- 1948, for the Memphis Red Sox

Last appearance
- ?, for the ?

Teams
- Memphis Red Sox (1948); Kansas City Monarchs (?); Indianapolis Clowns (?)

Nathaniel Peeples (June 29, 1926 – August 30, 2012) was a professional baseball outfielder in the 1940s, 1950s and 1960s. He played in the Negro leagues and in minor league baseball.

== Early life ==
Peeples was born in Memphis, Tennessee. He attended LeMoyne-Owen College.

== Negro league career ==
He played for the Memphis Red Sox (in 1948), Kansas City Monarchs and Indianapolis Clowns of the Negro American League.

== Minor league career ==
Peeples spent ten seasons in the minor leagues, from 1951 to 1960. He began his career in the Brooklyn Dodgers system, playing there from 1951 to 1953. He joined the Milwaukee Braves system in 1953 and remained there until 1959. He briefly joined the Chicago Cubs system in 1959 and last played in the Mexican League in 1960.

=== Notable seasons ===
In 1954, Peeples played briefly for the Atlanta Crackers of the Southern Association. Though he played only two games with the team, his stay was notable for he became the only African American to ever play in the Southern Association. The ripples of racism still permeated the South in those days, however, and – facing pressure from other league clubs – the Crackers sent him to the Jacksonville Braves of the South Atlantic League, prematurely ending his stay with the Atlanta squad after a two-week stint. Other sources say it was Peeples' lack of ability that earned his demotion to Jacksonville.

In 1957, with the Corpus Christi Clippers of the Big State League, Peeples hit .314 with 25 home runs, 116 runs scored and 99 RBI, leading the league in the latter two categories and finishing second in home runs, behind Don Miles' 28. The following year, with the Austin Senators of the Texas League, he hit .259 with 21 home runs, 79 RBI and 23 stolen bases, finishing second in the league in steals, behind Rod Kanehl.

== Death ==
Peeples died at the age of 86 in Memphis, Tennessee.
