= Ray Yochim =

American baseball player (1922–2002)

- Pitcher
- Born: July 19, 1922; New Orleans, Louisiana
- Died: January 26, 2002 (aged 79); New Orleans, Louisiana
- Batted: Right Threw: Right

MLB debut
- May 2, 1948, for the St. Louis Cardinals

Last MLB appearance
- May 22, 1949, for the St. Louis Cardinals

MLB statistics
- Win–loss record: 0–0
- Earned run average: 10.80
- Strikeouts: 4
- Stats at Baseball Reference

Teams
- St. Louis Cardinals (1948–1949)

Raymond Austin Aloysius Yochim (July 19, 1922 – January 26, 2002) was an American professional baseball pitcher who appeared in four games over parts of two seasons in Major League Baseball for the St. Louis Cardinals—one game in 1948 and three during 1949. A native and lifelong resident of New Orleans, he threw and batted right-handed, stood 6 feet 1 inch (1.85 m) tall and weighed 170 pounds (77 kg).

Yochim had an extensive career in minor league baseball. He began in 1941 with the Springfield Cardinals, and moved his way up in the St. Louis organization over that year and 1942. He then missed three seasons, 1943 to 1945, while serving in the United States Marine Corps in the Pacific Theater of World War II. On April 19, 1945, The Sporting News erroneously reported that Yochim had died aboard a sunken transport ship during the Battle of Iwo Jima; however, Yochim was alive and stationed in Hawaii. The newspaper quickly printed a retraction when it learned that Yochim had disembarked from the ship earlier when he reported to his base in Hawaii before the vessel was deployed to the battle zone.

Yochim returned to baseball with the Triple-A Rochester Red Wings in 1946–1947. His major-league trials occurred during the month of May in both 1948 and 1949. Used exclusively in relief by Cardinals' manager Eddie Dyer, he did not earn a decision or a save, posting a 10.80 earned run average. He allowed three hits, four earned runs and seven bases on balls in 31/3 innings pitched, and was credited with four strikeouts and four games finished.

After his brief major league career, he continued to play in the minor leagues until 1958, when he served as player-manager of the New Orleans Pelicans.

He was the older brother of former MLB pitcher and longtime scout Lenny Yochim (1928–2013).
