= Bill Ayers (baseball) =

American baseball player (1919-1980)

- Ayers c. 1947
- Pitcher
- Born: September 27, 1919; Newnan, Georgia, U.S.
- Died: September 24, 1980 (aged 60); Newnan, Georgia, U.S.
- Batted: Right Threw: Right

MLB debut
- April 17, 1947, for the New York Giants

Last MLB appearance
- July 13, 1947, for the New York Giants

MLB statistics
- Win–loss record: 0–3
- Earned run average: 8.15
- Strikeouts: 22
- Stats at Baseball Reference

Teams
- New York Giants (1947)

William Oscar Ayers (September 27, 1919 – September 24, 1980) was an American Major League Baseball pitcher from Newnan, Georgia. He played for the New York Giants during the 1947 season.

== Early life ==
Ayers was born on August 27, 1919, in Newnan, Georgia.

His brother Lonzo "Tommy" Ayers eventually went on to play professional baseball from 1947 to 1949.

Ayers enlisted for service in the United States Army for World War II on July 10, 1943, at Fort McPherson in Atlanta.

== Career ==
Ayers started his professional career playing for the Shelby Cardinals in the 1937 season. He played for consequent teams the Andalusia Bulldogs, the Gastonia Cardinals, the Daytona Beach Islanders, and the Cordele Bees before taking a 3-year hiatus from 1939 to 1942. He briefly played for the Savannah Indians, before transferring to the Atlanta Crackers.

In 1943, Ayers signed up for military service in World War II. Ayers was with the 65th Infantry Division in Europe in 1945, and pitched for the division baseball team following the German surrender. Ayers perfected his forkball during this time and the 65th Infantry Division were II Corps champions. He was then selected to play for the 71st Infantry Division – Third Army representatives – in the 1945 ETO World Series in September 1945.

Returning to the Atlanta Crackers in 1946, Ayers had an outstanding season with a 21–10 record and 1.95 ERA. On August 8, went the distance for Atlanta in a 21-inning 4–4 tie with Mobile.

Sold to the New York Giants along with Earl McGowan and Lloyd Gearhart, he was a spring training sensation for the Giants, allowing only two earned runs in 23 innings. He made his major league debut on April 17, 1947, as the team's number two starter, but lasted only three and two-thirds innings against the Phillies, giving up seven hits.

The Giants traded Ayers to Oakland in the Pacific League at the end of 1950 where he flourished with a 20–13 season in 1951. He pitched for the Havana Reds in the Cuban League in 1952 and led the team to the Caribbean Series crown in Panama that year. After a slow start in 1953, the Oaks peddled Ayers to Wenatchee in the Western International League, but the 33-year-old refused to report and returned to his home in Newnan, Georgia. In 1954, he briefly reappeared in the minors with Montgomery in the South Atlantic League. Ayers later played for the Atlanta Crackers once more during the 1954 season before retiring.

== Personal life ==
After his baseball career, Ayers was a route mail clerk for the U.S. Postal Service. He died from a heart attack while golfing on September 24, 1980, in Newnan, Georgia. He died three days before his 61st birthday.

He was inducted in the Coweta Sports Hall of Fame in 2004.
