= Lenny Yochim =

American baseball player (1928–2013)

- Pitcher
- Born: October 16, 1928; New Orleans, Louisiana, U.S.
- Died: May 11, 2013 (aged 84); New Orleans, Louisiana, U.S.
- Batted: Left Threw: Left

MLB debut
- September 18, 1951, for the Pittsburgh Pirates

Last MLB appearance
- June 19, 1954, for the Pittsburgh Pirates

MLB statistics
- Win–loss record: 1–2
- Earned run average: 7.62
- Strikeouts: 12
- Stats at Baseball Reference

Teams
- Pittsburgh Pirates (1951, 1954)

Leonard Joseph Yochim (October 16, 1928 – May 11, 2013) was an American professional baseball pitcher. He played in parts of two seasons in Major League Baseball for the Pittsburgh Pirates in 1951 and 1954, and later served in the organization for almost four decades. Yochim batted and threw left-handed.

Yochim was born and died in New Orleans, Louisiana. Highly touted by the Pittsburgh Pirates during his career, he was a screwball specialist and had a good curve as well, but a sore arm limited him to pitch in only 28.1 innings. He pitched in two games in 1951 and ten in 1954, ending his major league career with a 1–2 record and a 7.62 ERA in 12 games (three as a starter).

His professional career highlight came on December 8, 1955, when he became the first pitcher to throw a no-hitter in the Venezuelan Professional Baseball League for the Leones del Caracas club. Helped by catcher Earl Battey, Yochim accomplished the feat in the Caracas 3–0 victory over the Navegantes del Magallanes. Ramón Monzant was credited with the loss.

Besides, he also played in the league for Vargas, Gavilanes and Magallanes, compiling a 29–20 record and a 3.57 ERA in 86 games from 1952 through 1956, while pitching for Caracas in the 1953 Caribbean Series.

Following his playing career, Yochim rejoined the Pittsburgh Pirates organization in 1966 to become a member of their baseball operations department. He served as an area scout, national crosschecker and major-league scout for the Pirates before moving into the front office in 1994. Yochim also worked as a senior adviser for player personnel from 1994 through 2004, when he decided not to return for another season.

He was the older brother of former MLB pitcher and minor league manager and coach Ray Yochim (1922–2002).
