= Pedro Formental =

Cuban baseball player (born 1915)

- Outfielder
- Born: April 19, 1915; Báguanos, Cuba
- Died: September 15, 1992 (aged 77); Cleveland, Ohio, U.S.

Negro leagues debut
- 1947, for the Memphis Red Sox

Last Negro leagues appearance
- 1947, for the Memphis Red Sox

Negro leagues (Note: On December 16, 2020, Major League Baseball declared the Negro leagues, from the span of 1920–1948, to be a "Major League". Formental's statistics reflect his time in the Negro leagues in 1947.) statistics
- Batting average: .280
- Hits: 14
- Home runs: 2
- Runs batted in: 12
- Stats at Baseball Reference

Teams
- Alijadores de Tampico (1943); Azules de Veracruz (1944–1945); Habana (1945–1955); Tuneros de San Luis (1946); Memphis Red Sox (1947, 1949)

Member of the Caribbean

Baseball Hall of Fame
- Induction: 2006

Pedro Roberto Formental (April 19, 1915 – September 15, 1992) was a Cuban professional baseball outfielder in the Mexican League, Negro leagues and in the Cuban League. He played from 1943 to 1955 with several teams. He was selected to the Negro league East-West All-Star Game in 1949.

Formental holds several Cuban League career records, including home runs (54), runs scored (431), and runs batted in (362), as well as the single-season record for RBIs (57). He also played in the 1951, 1952, and 1953 Caribbean Series.
