= Bob Alexander =

Canadian baseball player (1922–1993)

- Pitcher
- Born: August 7, 1922; Vancouver, British Columbia, Canada
- Died: April 7, 1993 (aged 70); Oceanside, California, U.S.
- Batted: Right Threw: Right

Professional debut
- MLB: April 11, 1955, for the Baltimore Orioles
- NPB: 1959, for the Toei Flyers

Last appearance
- MLB: September 22, 1957, for the Cleveland Indians
- NPB: 1959, for the Toei Flyers

MLB statistics
- Win–loss record: 1–1
- Earned run average: 10.64
- Strikeouts: 2
- Stats at Baseball Reference

Teams
- Baltimore Orioles (1955); Cleveland Indians (1957); Toei Flyers (1959)

Robert Somerville Alexander (August 7, 1922 – April 7, 1993) was a Canadian professional baseball pitcher. He attended Bethany College in West Virginia. Alexander was signed by the New York Yankees in 1942. However, he did not make his Major League debut until 1955 with the Baltimore Orioles. He also played for the Cleveland Indians and the Toei Flyers of the Nippon Professional Baseball (NPB).

He is the first Canadian player in NPB history.

On top of playing baseball, he was also an Aviation Cadet in the United States Navy during World War II.

== Professional career ==
=== New York Yankees ===
Before entering military service in 1944 Bob pitched for the Butler Yankees of the Class D Pennsylvania State Association and the Amsterdam Rugmakers in the Class C Canadian–American League. In 1943 Bob pitched for the Wellsville Yankees in the Class D Pony League and was 4–3 with a 3.60 ERA.

In 1944 Bob split the season with Wellsville, the Hagerstown Owls of the Interstate League and the Norfolk Tars of the Piedmont League for a combined 6–9 record.

After his service Bob returned to the Norfolk Tars where Bob was 6–5 with a 2.64 ERA and also spent time with the Binghamton Triplets of the Class A Eastern League in 1946. Robert Alexander continued to pitch in the minor leagues with the Denver Bears in the Western League, where Bob was 10–12 with a 4.15 ERA in 1947, and the Beaumont Exporters in the Texas League where Bob was 11–16 with a 3.70 ERA in 1948. In 1949 Bob compiled a record of 8–8 with the Louisville Colonels in the American Association and a record of 12–10 with the Colonels in 1950. Bob threw a no-hitter on July 29, 1950 against the Milwaukee Brewers.

=== Brooklyn Dodgers ===
In 1951 Bob was acquired by the Brooklyn Dodgers and pitched for the Montreal Royals in the International League, where Bob compiled a 15–9 record with a 3.58 ERA. Bob performed well enough to earn a spot on the spring training roster with the Dodgers in 1952. Bob didn't make the club in '52, instead he was back with Montreal for the regular season and was 8–7 with a 4.34 ERA.

Robert Alexander remained with Montreal in 1953 and after the season, Bob underwent surgery to remove bone chips from his elbow.

=== Portland Beavers ===
In 1954 Bob was acquired by the Portland Beavers of the Pacific Coast League where Bob finished with a 10–12 record and 3.22 ERA. At the end of the season, Robert Alexander, who was 32 years old at the time, was purchased by the Baltimore Orioles.

=== Baltimore Orioles ===
Robert Alexander made his Major League debut in a relief appearance for the Orioles on April 11, 1955 against the Washington Senators. Bob would make a further three relief outings before returning to Portland in July to record a 10–10 record and excellent 2.66 ERA.

=== Cleveland Indians ===
Robert Alexander continued to be a stellar pitcher in the Pacific Coast League and got his final shot at the Major Leagues in 1957, when the 35-year-old right-hander joined the Cleveland Indians pitching staff. Robert Alexander made five relief appearances for the Indians to end his Major League career.
