= Al Pinkston =

American baseball player

- Born: October 22, 1917; Newbern, Alabama, U.S.
- Died: March 18, 1981 (aged 63); Fort Wayne, Indiana, U.S.
- Batted: Left Threw: Right

Negro leagues debut
- 1948, for the Cleveland Buckeyes

Last Negro leagues appearance
- 1948, for the Cleveland Buckeyes
- Stats at Baseball Reference

Teams
- Cleveland Buckeyes (1948)

Member of the Mexican Professional

Baseball Hall of Fame
- Induction: 1974

Alfred Charles Pinkston (October 22, 1917 – March 18, 1981) was an American Negro league and Mexican League baseball player.

== Life and career ==
A native of Newbern, Alabama, Pinkston played one game for the Cleveland Buckeyes of the Negro leagues in 1948. He played in the Provincial League in the early 1950s and won the league's triple crown in 1952 for the St. Hyacinthe A's. Pinkston went on to play minor league baseball for such clubs as the Ottawa Athletics, Columbus Jets and Amarillo Gold Sox, and spent several years in the Mexican League into the mid-1960s, eventually earning induction into the Mexican Professional Baseball Hall of Fame in 1974.

On June 27, 1962, his son, Adrián Chávez, was born. Pinkston wanted to take Chávez with him back to the U.S., but his mother wouldn't allow it, going as far as changing Chávez's name to prevent him from doing so. Chávez would go on to become a professional soccer player, representing Mexico in the 1994 FIFA World Cup.

Pinkston died in Fort Wayne, Indiana in 1981 at age 63.
