= René González (baseball) =

Cuban baseball player

- Outfielder
- Born: August 5, 1918; Cienfuegos, Cuba
- Died: May 9, 1982 (aged 63); Cuba
- Batted: Right Threw: Right
- Stats at Baseball Reference

Teams
- Tuneros de San Luis (1947, 1949, 1951); Azules de Veracruz (1947); Diablos Rojos del México (1948); Alijadores de Tampico (1948); Rojos del Águila de Veracruz (1952–1955); Tecolotes de Nuevo Laredo (1956); Sultanes de Monterrey (1956)

Member of the Mexican Professional

Baseball Hall of Fame
- Induction: 1993

René González (August 5, 1918 – May 9, 1982) was a Cuban professional baseball player. A native of Cienfuegos, Cuba, González was a first baseman/outfielder who batted and threw right-handed.

González was a consistent hitter who spent most of his career in Mexican baseball (1947–1949, 1951–1956), where he won three consecutive batting titles (1952–54) including the Triple Crown in 1952. An eight-time .300 hitter, he collected 1144 hits in 3459 at-bats for a .331 batting average during nine seasons.

In 1950, González played for the New York Cubans in the Negro leagues.

After that he played for the Patriotas de Venezuela club of the Venezuelan Professional Baseball League during the 1951–1952 season. He finished with a .357 batting average and led the league in home runs (10), RBI (56), hits (74), doubles (18) and slugging % (.739). Later, he played as a reinforcement for the Navegantes del Magallanes in the 1951 Caribbean Series, where he led the Venezuelan offensive with a .333 average and two home runs, while his 11 RBI topped the tournament.

González also played in Cuba and Nicaragua up until 1958, his last season. Following his baseball retirement he returned to his Cuba homeland, where he died aged 63.

In 1993 he was inducted into the Mexican Professional Baseball Hall of Fame.

== Sources ==
- Antero Núñez, José. Series del Caribe. Jefferson, Caracas, Venezuela: Impresos Urbina, C.A., 1987.
- Gutiérrez, Daniel. Enciclopedia del Béisbol en Venezuela. Caracas, Venezuela: Editorial La Brújula, C.A., 1997.
- MLBlogs.com – René González fue un Gigante en el Caribe (Spanish Biography)
