= Bill Wright (outfielder) =

American baseball player (1914–1996)

- Outfielder
- Born: June 6, 1914; Milan, Tennessee, U.S.
- Died: August 3, 1996 (aged 82); Aguascalientes City, Mexico
- Batted: Both Threw: Right

Negro leagues debut
- 1932, for the Nashville Elite Giants

Last Negro leagues appearance
- 1945, for the Baltimore Elite Giants

Negro leagues statistics
- Batting average: .325
- Hits: 445
- Home runs: 26
- Runs batted in: 250
- Stolen bases: 39

Teams
- Nashville Elite Giants (1932–1934); Columbus Elite Giants (1935); Washington Elite Giants (1936–1937); Baltimore Elite Giants (1938–1939, 1942, 1945)

Career highlights and awards
- 9× All-Star (1935–1939, 1939², 1942, 1942², 1945); Negro National League champion (1939)

Member of the Mexican Professional

Baseball Hall of Fame
- Induction: 1982

Burnis "Wild Bill" Wright (June 6, 1914 – August 3, 1996) was an American professional baseball player in the Negro leagues and the Mexican League. Primarily an outfielder, he played from 1932 to 1956.

== Baseball career ==
Wright was born in Milan, Tennessee in 1914. He played baseball for the high school team in Gibson County. Wright first came into prominence due to receiving the nickname "Wild Bill" because of his problem with control, as he hurt his arm throwing too hard while trying to pitch in cold weather. He was thus shifted into playing center field, which he would do over the course of 25 years in two countries. He started with the Nashville Elite Giants and prevailed as a switch-hitter with a considerable frame at 6'4 and 220 pounds, and he later earned the nickname of being the "Black DiMaggio"

The team (who had moved to Cleveland for 1931) would end their second tenure in Nashville in 1934 in favor of Columbus in 1935 and Washington for 1936–37 before settling in Baltimore for 1938, and Wright would play for the team in each of its incarnations that generally competed well with the other teams in the league (the one title Wright was a part of was the 1939 season, in which the Negro National League held a playoff between the four best teams that resulted in Baltimore winning the championship cup). Wright played ten years in the Negro leagues, with nine in the Negro National League (II) and one in the Negro Southern League. He played in 363 games from the age of 18 to 31, leading the Negro leagues in triples in 1936 (5) and 1937 (11) while batting .300 in eight years (albeit with a varying number of games played, having played 50 games in 1942 and 1945 while playing just 25 in 1939).

In 1940, he moved to the Mexican League. In 1941, he won the Mexican League batting title, hitting .390 with the Rojos del México. He played ten years in Mexico over separate stints (1940–41, 1943–44, 1946–56). He batted .300 in Mexico eight times while winning the Triple Crown (batting average, home runs and runs batted in) in 1943 while batting .366 with thirteen home runs and 70 RBIs. His last year of play was in 1956 (at the age of 42), and he ultimately batted .335 in the country lifetime.

== Post career and legacy ==
From his retirement until his death, Wright lived in Aguascalientes City where he owned a hamburger restaurant, deciding to reside in the country permanently in 1958 and not returning to the United States until a Negro Leagues reunion 32 years later. He died in August 1996 at the age of 82.

In 2005, he was one of 39 Negro Leaguers selected as the final ballot for the National Baseball Hall of Fame, with Wright falling short while 17 players were selected. He was inducted into the Salón de la Fama del Beisbol Profesional de México (Mexico's Baseball Hall of Fame) in 1982 and the Tennessee Sports Hall of Fame in 2017.
