= Webbo Clarke =

Panamanian baseball player (1928–1970)

- Pitcher
- Born: June 8, 1928; Colón, Panama
- Died: June 14, 1970 (aged 42); Cristóbal, Colón, Panama
- Batted: Left Threw: Left

Professional debut
- NgL: 1946, for the Cleveland Buckeyes
- MLB: September 4, 1955, for the Washington Senators

Last MLB appearance
- September 24, 1955, for the Washington Senators

MLB statistics
- Win–loss record: 0–0
- Earned run average: 4.64
- Strikeouts: 9
- Innings pitched: 21 1/3
- Stats at Baseball Reference

Teams
- Negro leagues: Cleveland Buckeyes (1946–1948); Memphis Red Sox (1950–1951); Major League Baseball: Washington Senators (1955)

Career highlights and awards
- 5× NgL All-Star (1946–1948, 1950–1951)

Vibert Ernesto "Webbo" Clarke (June 8, 1928 – June 14, 1970) was a Panamanian professional baseball pitcher. Born in Colón, Clarke was left-handed and played in the Negro leagues and also made seven appearances for the 1955 Washington Senators of Major League Baseball. He stood 6 feet (1.8 m) tall and weighed 165 pounds (75 kg).

== Career ==
Before signing with Washington in 1955, Clarke pitched in the Negro leagues, including service with the Cleveland Buckeyes and Memphis Red Sox. In his first season in the Senators' system, Clarke compiled a win–loss record of 16–12 in 33 games (32 as a starting pitcher), with an earned run average of 3.40 in 262 innings pitched for the Charlotte Hornets of the Class A Sally League.

The performance earned him a promotion to the Senators' 40-man roster in September. Among his seven games with Washington, he made two starts: September 10 against the Kansas City Athletics and September 16 against the Baltimore Orioles. His debut start was the better of the two. He pitched seven innings and gave up four runs, all earned, and four hits, one of them a solo home run by Kansas City's Gus Zernial. He held a 5–1 lead through seven innings, but walked the bases loaded in the eighth frame and was removed from the game. The Senators' relief pitchers, Chuck Stobbs and Pedro Ramos, then gave up the tying runs and ultimately lost the game, 8–6. Clarke's seventh and last MLB game, September 24 against the Orioles, was his finest: appearing in relief, he set down all nine Baltimore batters he faced over three innings.

During his MLB trial, Clarke allowed 17 hits, 11 earned runs and 14 walks in 21 1/3 innings pitched, with nine strikeouts, no decisions to his record and an ERA of 4.64.

He returned to minor league baseball in 1956–1957 to finish his North American pro career, going only 14–32 and losing a combined 20 games in 1956 in the Sally League and Triple-A American Association.

Webbo Clarke died at age 42 in Cristóbal, Colón, in his native Panama.

== See also ==
- List of Negro league baseball players who played in Major League Baseball
