= 1971–72 Mexican Pacific League season =

- League: Mexican Pacific League
- Sport: Baseball
- Duration: 5 October 1971 – 26 January 1972
- Teams: 7
- Season champions: Algodoneros de Guasave
- Season MVP: (Mexico) Héctor Espino (Hermosillo)

LMP seasons
- ← 1970–71 1972–73 →

The 1971–72 Mexican Pacific League season was the 14th season in the history of the Mexican Pacific League (LMP). It was contested by seven teams, after the Ostioneros de Guaymas did not participate in this season.

The season was played in two halves, with teams earning points at the end of each half according to their finish. The four teams with the highest cumulative points qualified for the playoffs. The Algodoneros de Guasave won their first championship (and, as of 2025, only), defeating the Tomateros de Culiacán 4–2 in the final series, led by manager Vinicio García.

== Standings ==
=== First half ===
First half standings
Rank	Team	W	L	T	Pct.	GB	Pts.
1	Tomateros de Culiacán	21	14	3	.600	—	7
2	Algodoneros de Guasave	21	15	2	.583	0.5	6
3	Cañeros de Los Mochis	21	17	0	.553	1.5	5
4	Naranjeros de Hermosillo	19	18	1	.514	3.0	4
5	Mayos de Navojoa	18	20	0	.474	4.5	3
6	Yaquis de Obregón	16	21	1	.432	6.0	2
7	Venados de Mazatlán	13	24	1	.351	9.0	1

=== Second half ===
Second half standings
Rank	Team	W	L	T	Pct.	GB	Pts.
1	Venados de Mazatlán	21	15	0	.583	—	7
2	Yaquis de Obregón	20	16	1	.556	1.0	6
3	Algodoneros de Guasave	17	16	2	.515	2.5	5
4	Tomateros de Culiacán	18	17	1	.514	2.5	4
5	Naranjeros de Hermosillo	18	18	2	.500	3.0	3
6	Cañeros de Los Mochis	17	19	0	.472	4.0	2
7	Mayos de Navojoa	13	23	0	.361	8.0	1

=== General ===
General standings
Rank	Team	W	L	T	Pct.	GB	Pts.
1	Tomateros de Culiacán	39	31	4	.557	—	11
2	Algodoneros de Guasave	38	31	4	.551	0.5	11
3	Yaquis de Obregón	36	37	2	.493	4.5	8
4	Venados de Mazatlán	34	39	1	.466	6.5	8
5	Cañeros de Los Mochis	38	36	0	.514	3.0	7
6	Naranjeros de Hermosillo	37	36	3	.507	3.5	7
7	Mayos de Navojoa	31	43	0	.419	10.0	4

== Postseason ==
Semifinals
1	Culiacán	4
4	Mazatlán	3
2	Guasave	4
3	Obregón	1

Finals
1	Culiacán	2
2	Guasave	4

== League leaders ==
Batting leaders
Stat	Player	Team	Total
AVG	(Mexico) Héctor Espino	Hermosillo	.372
HR	(United States) Bobby Darwin	Hermosillo	27
RBI	(Mexico) Héctor Espino	Hermosillo	75
R	(Mexico) Héctor Espino	Hermosillo	56
H	(Mexico) Héctor Espino	Hermosillo	100
SB	(Mexico) Marcelo Juárez	Hermosillo	11

Pitching leaders
Stat	Player	Team	Total
ERA	(United States) Mark Ballinger	Los Mochis	2.13
W	(Mexico) José Peña	Los Mochis	12
L	(United States) Mark Ballinger	Los Mochis	9
L	(United States) Ralph Garcia	Obregón	9
L	(United States) Dick Rusteck	Los Mochis	9
SV	(Mexico) Manuel Lugo	Hermosillo	6
SV	(Mexico) Juan Suby	Obregón	6
IP	(United States) Mark Ballinger	Los Mochis	152.0
K	(United States) Mark Ballinger	Los Mochis	144

== Awards ==
The following players received awards at the end of the season.

Award	Player	Team
Manager of the Year	(Mexico) Vinicio García	Guasave
Most Valuable Player	(Mexico) Héctor Espino	Hermosillo
Rookie of the Year	(Mexico) Miguel Suárez	Guasave
