= Gabriel Lugo =

Mexican baseball player

- Second baseman
- Born: 19 April 1946; El Fuerte, Sinaloa, Mexico
- Died: 18 September 2017 (aged 71); El Fuerte, Sinaloa, Mexico

Career highlights and awards
- Saraperos de Saltillo #5 retired

Member of the Mexican Professional

Baseball Hall of Fame
- Induction: 2000

Gabriel Lugo Morales (19 April 1946 – 18 September 2017) was a Mexican professional baseball second baseman. Lugo, nicknamed "Jefe Cejas" (Chief Eyebrows), spent all his career in Mexican baseball, playing 18 seasons in the Mexican League and 15 seasons in the Mexican Pacific League. He was inducted into the Mexican Professional Baseball Hall of Fame as part of the class of 2000. Lugo, who is considered as one of the best second basemen in Mexican baseball, spent most of his career playing for the Cañeros de Los Mochis and Saraperos de Saltillo.

== Career ==
Lugo was born on 19 April 1946 in El Fuerte, Sinaloa. He started his professional career in the Mexican League playing for the Charros de Jalisco in 1966. In 1971, he was signed by the Saraperos de Saltillo, where he would play for the next seven seasons. On 11 July 1976, Lugo hit his 100th home run in the Mexican League in a game against the Alijadores de Tampico. He finished his career with the Saraperos with a total of 894 games, 1048 hits, 157 doubles, 114 home runs, 545 runs and 601 RBIs.

In 1978, Lugo left Saltillo and joined Tecolotes de Nuevo Laredo; later that year, he was traded to Cafeteros de Córdoba. Lugo played for Azules de Coatzacoalcos in 1978 and 1979. In 1980, he joined Bravos de León. In 1982, Lugo was signed by the Broncos de Reynosa, where he spent two seasons. He played his last Mexican League season in 1983 for the Rieleros de Aguascalientes.

Lugo also had a prolific career in the Mexican Pacific League (LMP), where he debuted in 1967 playing for the Cañeros de Los Mochis. The next season, 1968–69, Lugo was part of the Los Mochis team that won the LMP championship and he was crowned with the league's batting title, recording a batting average of .309. Lugo left Los Mochis on 1974–75 and played for Venados de Mazatlán, Mayos de Navojoa, Águilas de Mexicali, Yaquis de Obregón and Algodoneros de Guasave, retiring after the 1982–83 season.

After retiring, Lugo coached amateur and semiprofessional baseball clubs in his home state of Sinaloa. In 2000, Lugo was elected to the Mexican Professional Baseball Hall of Fame. On 19 May 2002, Saraperos de Saltillo retired Lugo's number 5. El Fuerte's local baseball stadium, Estadio Gabriel Lugo Morales (Gabriel Lugo Morales Stadium) was named in honor of Lugo, who was often seen seating on the stadium's bleachers.

== Death ==
Lugo died on 18 September 2017 in his hometown of El Fuerte, aged 71. The cause of death was diabetes. On 19 September 2017, a memorial service was held in the Gabriel Lugo Morales Stadium, attended by hundreds of locals, authorities and players of the Cañeros de Los Mochis, who served as pallbearers.

== Career statistics ==
=== Mexican Pacific League ===
Season	Team	G	AB	R	H	2B	3B	HR	RBI	SB	BB	BA
1967	Los Mochis / Hermosillo	71	266	28	55	10	2	2	10	4	12	.207
1968–69	Los Mochis	79	317	49	98	14	1	6	30	6	18	.309
1969–70	Los Mochis	64	284	39	77	7	1	3	23	5	18	.271
1970–71	Los Mochis	85	339	52	87	10	1	3	34	13	22	.257
1971–72	Los Mochis	67	270	39	70	15	0	5	21	9	20	.259
1972–73	Los Mochis	71	267	30	74	10	0	12	40	2	18	.277
1974–75	Los Mochis / Mazatlán	75	291	30	61	11	0	4	13	1	14	.210
1975–76	Mazatlán	84	321	21	76	11	2	6	37	4	21	.237
1976–77	Navojoa	47	175	18	46	11	0	2	21	0	10	.263
1977–78	Navojoa	62	219	21	54	5	0	3	18	2	16	.247
1978–79	Mexicali	66	227	21	47	5	0	3	21	1	23	.207
1979–80	Mexicali	58	204	15	46	7	0	2	17	0	15	.225
1980–81	Obregón	9	26	2	8	1	0	0	4	0	3	.308
1981–82	Guasave	7	23	1	2	0	0	0	1	0	2	.087
1982–83	Obregón	36	111	3	21	1	0	0	4	0	9	.189
Total		881	3340	369	822	118	7	51	294	47	221	.246
