= 1970–71 Mexican Pacific League season =

- League: Mexican Pacific League
- Sport: Baseball
- Duration: 7 October 1970 – 2 February 1971
- Teams: 8
- Season champions: Naranjeros de Hermosillo
- Season MVP: (Mexico) Héctor Espino (Hermosillo)

LMP seasons
- ← 1969–70 1971–72 →

The 1970–71 Mexican Pacific League season was the 13th season in the history of the Mexican Pacific League (LMP). It was contested by eight teams, two more than the previous season. The season was played in two halves, with teams earning points at the end of each half according to their finish. The four teams with the highest cumulative points qualified for the postseason, that were played in a round robin. If the team that finished first in the regular season and the winner of the postseason round-robin were different, a final series would be played to determine the champion.

Two teams joined the league: the Algodoneros de Guasave and the Mayos de Navojoa. The Mayos had originally debuted in 1962, played for five seasons until 1967, and then returned in this season; while the Algodoneros made their debut in the LMP.

The Naranjeros de Hermosillo won their fourth championship, defeating the Cañeros de Los Mochis in the final series 3–1, led by manager Maury Wills. Naranjeros' Héctor Espino won the batting Triple Crown, recording a .348 batting average, 22 home runs and 62 RBI. By winning the LMP title, the Naranjeros became the first Mexican team to participate in the Caribbean Series, doing so in the 1971 tournament.

== Standings ==
=== First half ===
First half standings
| Rank | Team | W | L | T | Pct. | GB | Pts. |
|---|---|---|---|---|---|---|---|
| 1 | Cañeros de Los Mochis | 28 | 15 | 1 | .651 | — | 8 |
| 2 | Naranjeros de Hermosillo | 26 | 18 | 0 | .591 | 2.5 | 7 |
| 3 | Yaquis de Obregón | 23 | 19 | 3 | .548 | 4.5 | 6 |
| 4 | Venados de Mazatlán | 23 | 19 | 3 | .548 | 4.5 | 5 |
| 5 | Tomateros de Culiacán | 23 | 21 | 1 | .523 | 5.5 | 4 |
| 6 | Algodoneros de Guasave | 17 | 27 | 0 | .386 | 11.5 | 3 |
| 7 | Ostioneros de Guaymas | 17 | 27 | 1 | .386 | 11.5 | 2 |
| 8 | Mayos de Navojoa | 16 | 27 | 1 | .372 | 12.0 | 1 |

=== Second half ===
Second half standings
| Rank | Team | W | L | T | Pct. | GB | Pts. |
|---|---|---|---|---|---|---|---|
| 1 | Naranjeros de Hermosillo | 30 | 13 | 0 | .698 | — | 8 |
| 2 | Cañeros de Los Mochis | 29 | 14 | 0 | .674 | 1.0 | 7 |
| 3 | Yaquis de Obregón | 27 | 15 | 0 | .643 | 2.5 | 6 |
| 4 | Venados de Mazatlán | 21 | 21 | 0 | .500 | 8.5 | 5 |
| 5 | Tomateros de Culiacán | 18 | 23 | 1 | .439 | 11.0 | 4 |
| 6 | Mayos de Navojoa | 17 | 25 | 0 | .405 | 12.5 | 3 |
| 7 | Algodoneros de Guasave | 16 | 25 | 1 | .390 | 13.0 | 2 |
| 8 | Ostioneros de Guaymas | 10 | 32 | 0 | .238 | 19.5 | 1 |

=== General ===
General standings
| Rank | Team | W | L | T | Pct. | GB | Pts. |
|---|---|---|---|---|---|---|---|
| 1 | Cañeros de Los Mochis | 57 | 29 | 1 | .663 | — | 15 |
| 2 | Naranjeros de Hermosillo | 56 | 31 | 0 | .644 | 1.5 | 15 |
| 3 | Yaquis de Obregón | 50 | 34 | 3 | .595 | 7.0 | 12 |
| 4 | Venados de Mazatlán | 44 | 40 | 3 | .524 | 13.0 | 10 |
| 5 | Tomateros de Culiacán | 41 | 44 | 2 | .482 | 16.5 | 8 |
| 6 | Algodoneros de Guasave | 33 | 52 | 1 | .388 | 24.5 | 5 |
| 7 | Mayos de Navojoa | 33 | 52 | 0 | .388 | 24.5 | 4 |
| 8 | Ostioneros de Guaymas | 27 | 59 | 1 | .314 | 31.0 | 3 |

== Postseason ==
=== Round robin ===
| Rank | Team | W | L | Pct. | GB |
|---|---|---|---|---|---|
| 1 | Naranjeros de Hermosillo | 9 | 3 | .750 | — |
| 2 | Yaquis de Obregón | 8 | 4 | .667 | 1.0 |
| 3 | Cañeros de Los Mochis | 5 | 7 | .417 | 4.0 |
| 4 | Venados de Mazatlán | 2 | 10 | .167 | 7.0 |

=== Final series ===
==== Summary ====
Naranjeros de Hermosillo won the series, 3–1.

| Game | Date | Score | Location | Time | Attendance |
|---|---|---|---|---|---|
| 1 | 30 January | Hermosillo – 2, Los Mochis – 5 | Estadio Emilio Ibarra Almada | - | - |
| 2 | 31 January | Hermosillo – 6, Los Mochis – 5 | Estadio Emilio Ibarra Almada | - | - |
| 3 | 1 February | Los Mochis – 0, Hermosillo – 1 | Estadio Fernando M. Ortiz | - | - |
| 4 | 2 February | Los Mochis – 1, Hermosillo – 3 | Estadio Fernando M. Ortiz | - | - |

== League leaders ==
Batting leaders
| Stat | Player | Team | Total |
|---|---|---|---|
| AVG | (Mexico) Héctor Espino | Hermosillo | .348 |
| HR | (Mexico) Héctor Espino | Hermosillo | 22 |
| RBI | (Mexico) Héctor Espino | Hermosillo | 62 |
| R | (Mexico) Héctor Espino | Hermosillo | 64 |
| H | (Mexico) Manuel Ponce | Mazatlán | 109 |
| SB | (United States) Leon Brown | Obregón | 29 |

Pitching leaders
| Stat | Player | Team | Total |
|---|---|---|---|
| ERA | (Mexico) Vicente Romo | Obregón | 1.60 |
| W | (Mexico) Alfredo Ortiz | Hermosillo | 13 |
| L | (Mexico) Salvador Sánchez | Los Mochis / Guaymas | 13 |
| SV | (Mexico) Manuel Lugo | Hermosillo | 11 |
| IP | (Mexico) José Peña | Los Mochis | 179.0 |
| K | (Mexico) Felipe Leal | Obregón | 134 |

== Milestones ==
=== Pitchers ===
==== Perfect games ====
- Vicente Romo (OBR): On 5 January 1971, Romo threw a perfect game against the Ostioneros de Guaymas, winning 12–0. It was the first perfect game in the league’s history.

==== No-hitters ====
- Steve Bailey (GSV): On 28 November 1970, Bailey threw a no-hitter against the Ostioneros de Guaymas. It was the sixth no hitter in the history of the league.

== Awards ==
The following players received awards at the end of the season.

| Award | Player | Team |
|---|---|---|
| Manager of the Year | (United States) Maury Wills | Hermosillo |
| Most Valuable Player | (Mexico) Héctor Espino | Hermosillo |
| Rookie of the Year | (Mexico) Abelardo Vega | Navojoa |
