= Ramón Montoya (baseball) =

Mexican baseball player and coach

- Outfielder / Coach
- Born: 8 December 1940; Mexicali, Baja California, Mexico
- Died: 24 January 2018 (aged 77); Cuernavaca, Morelos, Mexico

Teams
- Diablos Rojos del México (1961–1976)

Career highlights and awards
- Diablos Rojos del México #32 retired; Mexican Pacific League records: 130 hits, single season

Member of the Mexican Professional

Baseball Hall of Fame
- Induction: 1990

Montoya's number was retired by the Diablos Rojos del México in 1976

Ramón "Diablo" Montoya Lerma (8 December 1940 – 24 January 2018) was a Mexican professional baseball outfielder and coach. Montoya spent all his career in the Mexican League playing center field for the Diablos Rojos del México. Nicknamed "Diablo" (Devil), Montoya also participated in the Mexican Pacific League and played one season, in 1964, for the El Paso Sun Kings of the Texas League. After retiring, he coached for the Diablos Rojos. Montoya was inducted into the Mexican Professional Baseball Hall of Fame as part of the class of 1990.

== Early career ==
Montoya was born on 8 December 1940 in Mexicali, Baja California. Nicknamed "Diablo" since his early days in local Mexicali, Montoya was part of the Mexican squad that competed in the 1961 Amateur World Series played in Costa Rica, where they placed second with a 7–2 record.

== Professional career ==
Montoya started his professional career in 1961 as Rodolfo Montoya in the Diablos Rojos del México of the Mexican League, playing eight games. In 1962, Montoya registered using his real name and became the Diablos Rojos starting centerfielder, a position he held for the next 15 seasons with the México squad.

In 1964, Montoya played in the Texas League for the El Paso Sun Kings, where he appeared in 90 games, but he had to return to Mexico due to a clavicle fracture. "Diablo" won four Mexican League championships with the Diablos Rojos, in 1968, 1973, 1974 and 1976. Montoya retired in 1976; that same year, his number, 32, was retired by the Diablos Rojos.

Montoya also played thirteen seasons in the Mexican Pacific League (LMP), debuting in the 1961–62 season for the Naranjeros de Hermosillo. He also played for the Rieleros de Empalme, Algodoneros de Guasave, Yaquis de Obregón, Tomateros de Culiacán and Ostioneros de Guaymas. During the 1963–64 season, while playing for the Rieleros, Montoya set the LMP single season record for most hits, with 130; as of 2023, the record is still active.

On 13 July 1990, Montoya was elected to the Mexican Professional Baseball Hall of Fame alongside infielder Alfredo Ríos, umpire Amado Maestri, journalist Tomás Morales, and executive Alfonso Robinson Bours. Montoya is also part of his hometown's Mexicali Hall of Fame.

During the seventies, the Diablos Rojos had a mascot named Ramoncito modelled after Montoya disguised as a red devil. The mascot made a comeback in 2024.

== Coaching career ==
After retiring as player, Montoya kept working with the Diablos Rojos as a coach and was even considered as a successor to legendary manager Cananea Reyes.

In his last years of life, Montoya worked as an instructor for the Alfredo Harp Helú Baseball Academy.

== Death ==
Montoya died on 24 January 2018 in Cuernavaca, Morelos, aged 77.

== Career statistics ==
=== Mexican Pacific League ===
Season	Team	G	AB	R	H	2B	3B	HR	RBI	SB	BB	BA
1961–62	Hermosillo	60	219	27	64	11	2	0	21	4	23	.292
1962–63	Empalme	62	244	36	68	8	0	2	27	7	17	.279
1963–64	Empalme	83	374	67	130	13	5	7	42	6	16	.348
1964–65	Empalme	79	300	37	94	8	2	2	32	6	23	.313
1966–67	Empalme	88	349	48	102	13	3	2	24	5	27	.292
1967	Hermosillo	84	321	36	90	13	1	3	23	3	14	.280
1969–70	Hermosillo	57	228	32	60	6	0	1	21	3	17	.263
1970–71	Guasave	68	260	34	70	6	4	0	24	7	11	.269
1971–72	Guasave	68	257	26	68	6	2	1	27	1	28	.265
1972–73	Guasave	72	268	29	74	15	1	3	36	2	27	.276
1973–74	Obregón	46	147	15	46	6	0	1	11	3	20	.313
1974–75	Culiacán	45	164	15	41	8	0	1	14	5	14	.250
1975–76	Guaymas	3	10	1	1	0	0	0	0	0	0	.100
Total		815	3141	403	908	113	20	23	302	52	237	.289
