= Juan Suby =

Mexican baseball player (1940-1995)

- Pitcher
- Born: 16 September 1940; Puerto Cortés, Baja California Sur, Mexico
- Died: 12 March 1995 (aged 54); Esperanza, Sonora, Mexico
- Batted: Right Threw: Right

Mexican League statistics
- Win–loss record: 145–132
- Earned run average: 3.39
- Strikeouts: 1,090

Teams
- Pericos de Puebla (1961–1964); Charros de Jalisco (1965–1968); Tigres del México (1968–1975); Alijadores de Tampico (1975); Tigres del México (1976); Rojos del Águila de Veracruz (1979)

Member of the Mexican Professional

Baseball Hall of Fame
- Induction: 2013

Juan Hernández Camacho (16 September 1940 – 12 March 1995), better known Juan Suby, was Mexican professional baseball pitcher. He played 17 seasons in the Mexican League for the Pericos de Puebla, Charros de Jalisco, Tigres del México, and Alijadores de Tampico, winning three league titles. He also played 14 seasons in the Mexican Pacific League.

Nicknamed Brazo de Acero (Arm of Steel) for his durability, Suby was inducted into the 2013 class of the Mexican Professional Baseball Hall of Fame.

== Early years ==
Juan Hernández Camacho was born on 16 September 1940 in Puerto Cortés, Baja California Sur, though he moved to Salina Cruz, Oaxaca at a young age. He practiced cycling in his adolescence. Additionally, he was a talented amateur boxer who won tournaments in Oaxaca and Veracruz and even turned professional in 1957. He created the name "Juan Suby" so that his parents would not find out what he was doing, and the name would remain for the rest of his life.

== Playing career ==
Suby eventually quit boxing and moved to Mexico City to become a baseball player, pitching in various local leagues before he was recruited into the Pericos de Puebla farm system.

=== Mexican League ===
In 1961, Suby made his Mexican League debut with the Pericos de Puebla, going 1–4 with a 4.59 earned run average (ERA) and 24 strikeouts in 51 innings as a rookie. In his second year, he went 6–6 with a 4.70 ERA, striking out 34 batters in 113 innings. Suby won eight games in 1963 and helped the Pericos win their first-ever Mexican League championship. After four seasons with the Pericos, he joined the Charros de Jalisco in 1965 and became a strong contributor. In 1967, Suby went 10–8 with a league-best 2.36 ERA and aided the Charros to their first-ever Mexican League championship. However, he had several disagreements with team management and was dealt to the Tigres del México in 1968. Suby also played with the Porteños de Puerto México of the Mexican Southeast League that season.

After shining in a starting pitcher role early in his career, Suby later became known for his work as a relief pitcher, particularly during years with the Tigres del México. In 1969, Suby was the workhorse of the Tigres pitching staff, going 19–17 with a 2.63 ERA and 158 strikeouts in 243 innings. The following year, he became the first pitcher in team history to win 20 games in a season, losing 14. In 1971, Suby led the league with 22 wins against 12 losses, recording a 2.63 ERA and 111 strikeouts.

In 1975, Suby joined the Alijadores de Tampico midseason and won the Mexican League championship under manager Benny Valenzuela. He returned to the Tigres for one more season in 1976, though he saw limited time on the mound. Suby made a comeback with the Rojos del Águila de Veracruz in 1979.

Across 17 seasons in the Mexican League, Suby went 145–132 with a 3.39 ERA and 1,090 strikeouts, with 68 complete games and 12 shutouts in 2,115 innings pitched.

=== Winter leagues ===
Suby pitched for the Cajeteros de Celaya of the Mexican Central League in 1961, going 4–1 with a 3.23 ERA and 18 strikeouts in 39 innings.

Suby made his Mexican Pacific League (LMP) debut for the Naranjeros de Hermosillo on 10 November 1961, pitching a complete game against the Yaquis de Obregón. He made an immediate impact with the team, both as a starter and reliever, going 3–6 with a 2.59 ERA in his first season and helping Hermosillo win the 1961–62 league title. The following year, Suby was dealt to the Yaquis de Obregón midseason, purportedly for punching teammate Juan de Dios Villarreal while defending another teammate on a bus trip from Guaymas to Hermosillo.

Suby debuted for the Yaquis de Obregón in a relief role against the Cañeros de Los Mochis on 25 November 1962. That season, he led the league in wins (14, tied with Miguel Sotelo) and shutouts (three). Known for his outspoken nature, Suby was dealt yet again to the Rieleros de Empalme the following season. The Rieleros manager, Manolo Fortes, helped develop Suby into a winning pitcher. Following the 1966–67 season, the Rieleros folded and he was selected by the Tomateros de Culiacán in the ensuing dispersal draft. Suby won 14 games and recorded 149 strikeouts in his first year with the Tomateros, though he won just four the following year, prompting a trade to the Yaquis de Obregón. Suby threw the first pitch in the history of the Estadio Tomás Oroz Gaytán. He later played for the Cañeros de Los Mochis, the Venados de Mazatlán and the Algodoneros de Guasave.

In 14 seasons in the Mexican Pacific League, Suby went 96–87 with a 2.83 ERA and 1,009 strikeouts, along with 14 shutouts, in 1,686 innings pitched. He is ninth all-time in strikeouts.

== Death and legacy ==
Suby died on 12 March 1995 in Esperanza, Sonora.

Suby was inducted into the Mexican Professional Baseball Hall of Fame as a member of the class of 2013 along with Cornelio García, Alfredo Mariscal, and Jesús Ríos.
