= Rolando Camarero =

Mexican baseball player (1943–2019)

- Camarero in 1963 with El Águila de Veracruz
- Second baseman / Outfielder / Pitcher / Manager
- Born: 25 April 1943; Antón Lizardo, Veracruz, Mexico
- Died: 3 April 2019 (aged 75); Tecamachalco, Puebla, Mexico
- Batted: Right Threw: Right

Teams
- Rojos del Águila de Veracruz (1963–1967); Petroleros de Poza Rica (1968); Rojos del Águila de Veracruz (1968–1974); Rieleros de Aguascalientes (1975); Alijadores de Tampico (1975); Rieleros de Aguascalientes (1976); Rojos del Águila de Veracruz (1979)

Career highlights and awards
- El Águila de Veracruz #25 retired

Rolando Camarero Cruz (26 March 1943 – 11 August 2019) was a Mexican professional baseball player and manager. During his career, that spanned from 1962 to 1979, he played 15 seasons in the Mexican League and 11 seasons in the Mexican Pacific League, mostly as a second baseman and outfielder but also, to a lesser extent, as a pitcher. He holds the Mexican League record for most played games in a season, with 161, achieved in 1969 while playing for El Águila de Veracruz. His durability and consistency as a regular starter, combined with this record, earned him the nickname "El Caballo de Hierro" ("The Iron Horse").

As a manager, Camarero spent three stints with Veracruz (1979, 1999 to 2000 and 2003 to 2004), and the 2002 season as skipper for the Olmecas de Tabasco.

== Playing career ==
Camarero was born on 26 March 1943 in Antón Lizardo, Veracruz. He made his professional debut in 1961 with the Tuzos de Guanajuato of the Mexican Central League, a feeder minor league for the Mexican League; he made a total of 93 appearances with the Tuzos across two seasons, primarily as a position player, but he also pitched six games in 1961.

Camarero made his Mexican League debut with the Rojos del Águila de Veracruz in 1963 after two seasons in the Mexican Central League. He appeared in 97 games in his debut season, posting a .229 batting average with 67 hits, 5 home runs and 29 RBIs. He rapidly became the starter second baseman for El Águila de Veracruz and occasionally played on the left field too.

In 1967, he appeared on 14 games for the Vancouver Mounties of the Pacific Coast League, part of the Kansas City Royals minor league system. He posted a .162/.205/.216 batting line. In 1968 he started the season with the Petroleros de Poza Rica but later returned to Veracruz. In 1969, Camarero appeared in all 161 of El Águila de Veracruz's regular-season games, setting the Mexican League record for most games played in a season, a mark that remains unbeaten as of 2026. He was part of the Veracruz team that won the 1970 Mexican League championship under manager Hank Izquierdo. He appeared on all of the Rojos' regular-season games, batting .304 AVG, 27 home runs and 91 RBIs.

In 1975, he transferred to the Rieleros de Aguascalientes and also played some games for the Alijadores de Tampico. After spending the entire 1976 season with Aguascalientes, Camarero held the Mexican League record for most consecutive games played without interruption, appearing in 1,166 straight games from 1968 to 1976; his record was later surpassed by Gerardo “Polvorita” Sánchez, who played in 1,415 consecutive games for the Tecolotes de los Dos Laredos from 1987 to 1998. He last played for Veracruz in 1979. After retiring, Veracruz retired Camarero's number 25.

Camarero also spent 11 seasons playing in the Mexican Pacific League. He played for the Yaquis de Obregón from 1962 to 1964, the Cañeros de Los Mochis from 1964 to 1966, then returned to Obregón from 1966 to 1972, before spending his last season in 1972–73 with the Ostioneros de Guaymas. He also made occasional appearances as a pitcher, recording three pitching appearances in the 1963–64 season and one each in the 1968–69 and 1969–70 seasons.

== Managerial career ==
Camarero managed the Rojos del Águila de Veracruz in three different stints. The first one in 1979, replacing Ronnie Camacho; he posted 17 wins, 23 losses and one tie, and was then replaced by Miguel Sotelo. The second one was from 1999 to 2000: Camarero replaced Raúl Cano for the rest of the 1999 season and managed the team during the entire 2000 season, leading the team to a 61–58–1 record, finishing third in the South Zone, but were eliminated by the Diablos Rojos del México in the first round of the playoffs. The last one was from 2003 to 2004: he replaced Andrés Mora in 2003 and skippered the entire 2004 season, failing to qualify to the postseason in both tournaments.

Camarero managed the Olmecas de Tabasco during the 2002 season. He was appointed manager on 13 May, replacing Marco Antonio Guzmán; on 11 June, he was reassigned as Player Development Coordinator and replaced by Marco Antonio Vázquez.

== Last years and death ==
In 2006, Camarero was injured in an armed attack on 19 November in Acayucan, Veracruz, while riding on the back of a pickup truck. Five people were killed, and two others, including Camarero, were injured. The attack occurred after an amateur baseball game, when armed men in a vehicle opened fire on the truck.

Camarero died of a heart attack at his home in Tecamachalco, Puebla, on 3 April 2019, aged 75.
