= Juan Navarrete (baseball) =

Mexican baseball player and manager (born 1953)

- Infielder / Manager
- Born: 22 September 1953 (age 73); Gómez Palacio, Durango, Mexico
- Bats: Left Throws: Right

Career highlights and awards
- Saraperos de Saltillo #23 retired

Member of the Mexican Professional

Baseball Hall of Fame
- Induction: 1998

Juan Navarrete Sánchez (born 22 September 1953) is a Mexican professional baseball manager and former infielder. As a player, he spent most of his career in Mexico playing both in the Mexican League and the Mexican Pacific League. As a manager, he notably led the Olmecas de Tabasco to their first (and, as of the 2026 season, only) Mexican League championship in 1993. In 1998, Navarrete was enshrined in the Mexican Professional Baseball Hall of Fame and in 2005 in the Caribbean Baseball Hall of Fame.

== Early life ==
Navarrete was born on 22 September 1953 in the Las Cuadras neighborhood of Gómez Palacio, Durango. His father, Hermenegildo, was a professional baseball player for the Algodoneros de Torreón in the 1950s.

== Playing career ==
=== Saraperos de Saltillo ===
Navarrete made his professional debut in 1970 playing for the Saraperos de Saltillo of the Mexican League in the team's inaugural season. He remained with the club in 1971 before leaving to play in the minor leagues in the United States.

=== Montreal Expos ===
In 1972, Navarrete signed with the Montreal Expos organization and began his minor-league career with the West Palm Beach Expos of the Class A Florida State League. In 1973, he played for the Québec Carnavals of the Double-A Eastern League. He spent the 1974 and 1975 seasons with the Memphis Blues of the Triple-A International League. In 1976, he played for the Denver Bears of the Triple-A American Association and the Québec Metros of the Double-A Eastern League. He returned to the Denver Bears in 1977 and left the organization after the end of the season.

=== Return to Mexican League and retirement ===
Navarrete returned to the Mexican League in 1978 for a second stint with the Saraperos de Saltillo, where he played until 1989. He then played for the Industriales de Monterrey in 1989 and 1990, retiring after the 1990 season with a career batting average of .327, 1,979 hits, and 668 runs batted in across 16 seasons in the league.

=== Mexican Pacific League ===
Navarrete played in the Mexican Pacific League (LMP), Mexico's winter league, from 1972 to 1991. He began his LMP career with the Yaquis de Ciudad Obregón, playing for the club from 1972 to 1984, and also played for the Mayos de Navojoa during the 1982–83 season. He then played for the Águilas de Mexicali from 1985 to 1988, winning the 1986 LMP championship and the 1986 Caribbean Series. Navarrete returned to the Mayos de Navojoa for the 1988–89 season before finishing his LMP career with the Ostioneros de Guaymas, whom he played for from 1989 to 1991.

== Career statistics ==
Mexican League career statistics
| Seasons | G | AB | R | H | 2B | 3B | HR | RBI | SB | BB | BA | SLG |
|---|---|---|---|---|---|---|---|---|---|---|---|---|
| 16 | 1607 | 6056 | 1005 | 1979 | 218 | 47 | 35 | 668 | 236 | 559 | .327 | .396 |

Mexican Pacific League career statistics
| Seasons | G | AB | R | H | 2B | 3B | HR | RBI | SB | BB | BA | SLG |
|---|---|---|---|---|---|---|---|---|---|---|---|---|
| 19 | 1227 | 4683 | 560 | 1271 | 128 | 23 | 15 | 391 | 200 | 450 | .271 | .318 |

Caribbean Series statistics
| Series | G | AB | R | H | 2B | 3B | HR | RBI | SB | BA | SLG |
|---|---|---|---|---|---|---|---|---|---|---|---|
| 5 | 25 | 82 | 11 | 26 | 1 | 1 | 0 | 5 | 2 | .317 | .354 |

== Managing career ==
While still an active player, Navarrete began his managerial career as player-manager of the Saraperos de Saltillo in 1983. He continued in the role in 1984, becoming the team's second manager of the season. He again managed Saltillo in 1985, but was replaced during the season by Roger Freed. Navarrete returned as player-manager in 1986. In 1989, he served as player-manager of the Industriales de Monterrey.

After his playing career ended, Navarrete returned to Saltillo as manager in 1991 and remained with the club through 1992. In 1993, he joined the Olmecas de Tabasco as the team manager and lead them to their first (and, as of the 2025 season, only) Mexican League championship, defeating the Tecolotes de los Dos Laredos 4 games to 1 in the championship series.

After managing the Tabasco through 1994, Navarrete joined the Oakland Athletics organization in 1995, managing the AZL Athletics of the Arizona Complex League through 1997. He then managed the Modesto A's of the California League in 1998, before managing the Visalia Oaks from 1999 to 2001. Navarrete returned to the Mexican League in 2004 for a second stint as manager of the Olmecas de Tabasco. In 2005, he managed the Vancouver Canadians.

Navarrete has also had an extensive managerial career in the Mexican Pacific League. He managed the Tomateros de Culiacán during the last part of the 1993–94 season, replacing Lorenzo Bundy. He then managed the Yaquis de Obregón in 1995–96 and the Cañeros de Los Mochis from 1996 to 2001. He was signed as manager of the Águilas de Mexicali for the 2006–07, but was dismissed and replaced by Enrique Reyes. In 2013–14, he replaced Reyes as manager of the Algodoneros de Guasave. In 2014, he joined as manager of the Charros de Jalisco, winning the LMP Manager of the Year award in 2014–15 season; he left the team in 2016. He returned to the Yaquis during the 2017–18 season, replacing Miguel Ojeda and later managed the Naranjeros de Hermosillo in 2020–21, leading the team to the LMP championship series.

== Legacy ==
Navarrete has had the greatest individual impact in the history of the Saraperos de Saltillo. As of the 2026 season, he holds the club's all-time records for hits (1,699), runs scored (877), and stolen bases (223). The Saraperos retired Navarrete's number 23 and he was selected as the second baseman for the club's all-time ideal team, created as part of the celebrations for the centenary of the Mexican League in 2025.

Navarrete was selected to the Mexican Professional Baseball Hall of Fame as part of the class of 1998 alongside pitcher Miguel Solís, outfielder Marcelo Juárez, and executive Eugenio Garza Sada.

In 2005, he was inducted into the Caribbean Baseball Hall of Fame together with infielder Rod Carew, outfielders Willie Mays and Minnie Miñoso, umpires Armando Rodríguez and Víctor Sáiz, and executive Horacio López Díaz. Navarrete appeared in five Caribbean Series, accumulating 82 at-bats, 26 hits, five RBIs, and 11 runs scored, while posting a .317 batting average. He was the 1985 batting champion with a .533 average and was selected to the 1985 and 1986 All Star Teams.
