= Ralph Garcia =

American baseball player (born 1948)

- Pitcher
- Born: December 14, 1948 (age 77); Los Angeles, California, U.S.
- Batted: Right Threw: Right

MLB debut
- September 26, 1972, for the San Diego Padres

Last MLB appearance
- April 21, 1974, for the San Diego Padres

MLB statistics
- Win–loss record: 0–0
- Earned run average: 4.70
- Strikeouts: 12
- Stats at Baseball Reference

Teams
- San Diego Padres (1972, 1974)

Member of the Mexican Professional

Baseball Hall of Fame
- Induction: 2005

Ralph "Rafael" Garcia (born December 14, 1948) is an American former Major League Baseball (MLB) pitcher. Garcia played for the San Diego Padres in 1972 and 1974. He batted and threw right-handed. He then played in the Mexican League from 1976 through 1988, mainly for the Indios de Ciudad Juarez. He was inducted into the Mexican Professional Baseball Hall of Fame in 2005.

Garcia also played winter baseball in the Mexican Pacific League for 16 seasons with the Yaquis de Obregón, Ostioneros de Guaymas, Mayos de Navojoa, Algodoneros de Guasave, Águilas de Mexicali, Venados de Mazatlán and Potros de Tijuana.
