= Marcelo Juárez =

Mexican baseball player (1942-1995)

- Outfielder
- Born: 26 October 1942; Río Bravo, Coahuila, Mexico
- Died: 7 August 2023 (aged 80); Saltillo, Coahuila, Mexico
- Batted: Right Threw: Right

Teams
- El Águila de Veracruz (1967–1969); Diablos Rojos del México (1969); Saraperos de Saltillo (1971–1976); Tecolotes de Nuevo Laredo (1976); Petroleros de Poza Rica (1977); Cafeteros de Córdoba (1977); Saraperos de Saltillo (1978–1981); Sultanes de Monterrey (1981); Saraperos de Saltillo (1982); Bravos de León (1984)

Member of the Mexican Professional

Baseball Hall of Fame
- Induction: 1998

Marcelo Juárez Moreno (26 October 1942 – 7 August 2023) was a Mexican professional baseball outfielder and coach. He spent four seasons in the minor leagues with the San Francisco Giants organization. Juárez also played 17 seasons in the Mexican League and 16 seasons the Mexican Pacific League. He is widely regarded as the greatest center fielder in the Mexican League history and was enshrined into the Mexican Professional Baseball Hall of Fame in 1998.

== Early life ==
Juárez was born on 26 October 1942 in Río Bravo, Coahuila. His father, Jesús, an amateur baseball player, introduced him to the sport. He played amateur baseball with the Bravos de Río Bravo from 1956 to 1960. He later played in the semi-professional Liga Norte de Coahuila. He was discovered by scout Ramón “Chita” García, who recommended him to the San Francisco Giants, where he signed a minor league contract.

== Professional career ==
=== Minor leagues ===
Juárez spent four seasons in the San Francisco Giants minor league system, from 1963 to 1966, playing in Class A and Class AA for the Lexington Giants, Decatur Commodores, El Paso Sun Kings (where he was a teammate of Ramón Montoya), Springfield Giants and Waterbury Giants. Unable to make it to the major leagues, he returned to Mexico.

=== Mexican League ===
Juárez made his Mexican League debut in 1967 playing for El Águila de Veracruz hitting .324 in 128 games. In 1969, he was traded to the Diablos Rojos del México. In 1970, however, the team released him after he failed to report to training camp, and he subsequently joined the Mineros de Sabinas of the Liga Norte.

In 1971, he returned to the Mexican League with the Saraperos de Saltillo, where he played until 1976. That year, he had a brief stint with the Tecolotes de Nuevo Laredo. He spent the 1977 season with both the Petroleros de Poza Rica and the Cafeteros de Córdoba. In 1978, he rejoined Saltillo and was part of the team that won the 1980 Mexican League championship, the first in Saraperos history. He played for the Sultanes de Monterrey in 1981, returned to the Saraperos in 1982, and ended his career in 1984 with the Bravos de León, appearing in only one game.

Juárez finished his Mexican League career with a .300 batting average, 1,897 hits, 48 home runs, and 644 RBIs in 1,705 games. He also holds the league record for the highest fielding average at .948.

=== Mexican Pacific League ===
Juárez spent 16 seasons in the Mexican Pacific League, making his debut in 1964 with the Mayos de Navojoa. He also played for the Tomateros de Culiacán, Naranjeros de Hermosillo, Algodoneros de Guasave, Águilas de Mexicali and Ostioneros de Guaymas, retiring after the 1981–82 season.

== Legacy ==
Juárez was elected to the Mexican Professional Baseball Hall of Fame as part of the class of 1998 alongside Juan Navarrete, Miguel Solís and Eugenio Garza Sada. In 2020, Juárez was selected as the all-time center fielder on the Mexican League’s historic team, commemorating the league’s 95th anniversary. The Saraperos de Saltillo honored Juárez by retiring his number 44.

== Death ==
Juárez died on 7 August 2023 in Saltillo, Coahuila, aged 80.
