= Alfredo Ríos =

Mexican baseball player and manager (1932–2019)

- Infielder / Manager
- Born: 24 August 1932; Guaymas, Sonora, Mexico
- Died: 1 February 2019 (aged 86); Guaymas, Sonora, Mexico
- Batted: Right Threw: Right

Member of the Mexican Professional

Baseball Hall of Fame
- Induction: 1990
Medals
Men's baseball
Representing Mexico
Central American and Caribbean Games
Silver medal – second place	1954 Mexico City	Team

Alfredo Ríos Meza (24 August 1932 – 1 February 2019), nicknamed "Yaqui", was a Mexican professional baseball infielder and manager. As a player, he spent his entire career in Mexico, playing in the Mexican League and the Mexican Pacific League. Ríos represented Mexico at the 1954 Central American and Caribbean Games, where the team won the silver medal. He was enshrined into the Mexican Professional Baseball Hall of Fame in 1990.

== Early career ==
Ríos was born on 24 August 1932 in the Punta Arena neighborhood of Guaymas, Sonora, Mexico. He represented Sonora at the 1952 Juegos de la Revolución and the 1953 National Championship, where the team won the championship.

In 1953, he was selected to represent Mexico at the 1953 Amateur World Series, where he set a record by handling 51 consecutive chances without committing an error. In 1954, he participated in the 1954 Central American and Caribbean Games in Mexico City, where the Mexican team won the silver medal behind Venezuela.

Ríos was nicknamed "Yaqui" because he frequently spent time with children from the Yaqui indigenous community, a nickname he embraced throughout his career as a reflection of his pride in his native Sonora.

== Professional career ==
=== Mineros de Cananea ===
In 1954, Ríos made his professional debut with the Mineros de Cananea of the Arizona–Mexico League, where he spent two seasons, appearing in a total of 209 games.

=== Mexican League ===
In 1956, Ríos made his Mexican League (LMB) debut with the Sultanes de Monterrey, with whom he played 12 seasons through 1966 and won the league championship in 1962. He joined the Diablos Rojos del México in 1967, playing three seasons with the club and winning a second LMB championship in 1968. In 1907 he was transferred to Unión Laguna.

On 19 August 1970, Ríos recorded his 2,000th career hit while playing for the Algodoneros against the Sultanes de Monterrey. He became the second player to reach the milestone, after Moisés Camacho, who had achieved it earlier that season.

He played his last LMB season with the Tigres de México in 1971. In 16 Mexican League seasons, he compiled a .290 batting average with 46 home runs, 715 runs batted in, and 900 runs scored in 1,860 games.

=== Mexican Pacific League ===
Ríos made his debut in the Pacific Coast League, the predecessor of the Mexican Pacific League (LMP), with the Venados de Mazatlán in 1945 and was named the league's Rookie of the Year. He next appears in LMP records with the Ostioneros de Guaymas, with whom he played from 1958 to 1965, winning league championships in 1959, 1960, 1963, and 1965.

He spent the 1965–66 season with the Yaquis de Obregón, helping the club win the 1966 championship, and split the 1966–67 season between the Cañeros de Los Mochis and Guaymas. Ríos then remained with the Ostioneros through the 1971 season, winning a fifth championship with the club in 1967 before retiring.

== Managerial career ==
Ríos made his managerial debut managing the Águilas de Mexicali during the 1984–85 Mexican Pacific League season. He subsequently managed in the Mexican League, leading the Acereros de Monclova in 1986 and 1987, the Algodoneros de Unión Laguna in 1988, returning to the Acereros in 1989, the Rieleros de Aguascalientes in 1991, and the Saraperos de Saltillo from 1992 to 1993.

== Legacy and death ==
Ríos was inducted into the Mexican Professional Baseball Hall of Fame as part of the class of 1990 alongside outfielder Ramón Montoya, umpire Amado Maestri, journalist Tomás Morales, and executive Alfonso Robinson Bours.

Ríos died of a myocardial infarction in his native Guaymas on 1 February 2019, aged 87.
