= 1972–73 Mexican Pacific League season =

- League: Mexican Pacific League
- Sport: Baseball
- Duration: 4 October 1972 – 11 January 1973
- Number of teams: 8
- Season champions: Yaquis de Obregón
- Season MVP: (Mexico) Héctor Espino (Hermosillo)

LMP seasons
- ← 1971–72 1973–74 →

The 1972–73 Mexican Pacific League season was the 15th season in the history of the Mexican Pacific League (LMP). It was contested by eight teams, one more than the previous season: the Ostioneros de Guaymas made a return after missing the previous season.

The season was played in two halves, with teams earning points at the end of each half according to their finish. The four teams with the highest cumulative points qualified for the playoffs. The Yaquis de Obregón won their second league championship, defeating the Mayos de Navojoa 4–1 in the final series, led by manager Dave Garcia.

== Standings ==
=== First half ===
First half standings
Rank	Team	W	L	T	Pct.	GB	Pts.
1	Naranjeros de Hermosillo	29	15	0	.659	—	8
2	Algodoneros de Guasave	23	21	0	.523	6.0	7
3	Tomateros de Culiacán	23	21	0	.523	6.0	6
4	Ostioneros de Guaymas	22	21	1	.512	6.5	5
5	Yaquis de Obregón	21	23	0	.477	8.0	4
6	Venados de Mazatlán	20	23	0	.465	8.5	3
7	Mayos de Navojoa	19	25	1	.432	10.0	2
8	Cañeros de Los Mochis	18	26	0	.409	11.0	1

=== Second half ===
Second half standings
Rank	Team	W	L	T	Pct.	GB	Pts.
1	Mayos de Navojoa	28	16	0	.636	—	8
2	Naranjeros de Hermosillo	26	16	0	.619	1.0	7
3	Yaquis de Obregón	25	17	0	.595	2.0	6
4	Ostioneros de Guaymas	22	21	0	.512	5.5	5
5	Cañeros de Los Mochis .	20	22	0	.476	7.0	4
6	Algodoneros de Guasave	19	23	0	.452	8.0	3
7	Tomateros de Culiacán	16	27	0	.372	11.5	2
8	Venados de Mazatlán	14	28	0	.333	13.0	1

=== General ===
General standings
Rank	Team	W	L	T	Pct.	GB	Pts.
1	Naranjeros de Hermosillo	55	31	0	.640	—	15
2	Mayos de Navojoa	47	41	1	.534	9.0	10
3	Algodoneros de Guasave	42	44	0	.488	13.0	10
4	Yaquis de Obregón	34	39	0	.466	14.5	10
5	Ostioneros de Guaymas	44	42	1	.512	11.0	10
6	Tomateros de Culiacán	39	48	0	.448	16.5	8
7	Cañeros de Los Mochis	38	48	0	.442	17.0	5
8	Venados de Mazatlán	34	51	0	.400	20.5	4

== Postseason ==
Semifinals
2	Navojoa	4
3	Guasave	3
1	Hermosillo	2
4	Obregón	4

Finals
2	Navojoa	1
4	Obregón	4

== League leaders ==
Batting leaders
Stat	Player	Team	Total
AVG	(Mexico) Héctor Espino	Hermosillo	.415
HR	(Mexico) Héctor Espino	Hermosillo	26
RBI	(Mexico) Héctor Espino	Hermosillo	83
R	(Mexico) Héctor Espino	Hermosillo	66
H	(Mexico) Héctor Espino	Hermosillo	125
SB	(Mexico) Héctor Zamudio	Guaymas	20

Pitching leaders
Stat	Player	Team	Total
ERA	(Mexico) Saúl Montoya	Hermosillo	1.89
W	(Mexico) Héctor Madrigal	Guaymas	16
L	(Mexico) Carlos Carrasco	Guasave	12
SV	(United States) Dennis O'Toole	Hermosillo	11
IP	(Mexico) Héctor Madrigal	Guaymas	183.0
K	(United States) Dyar Miller	Navojoa	150

== Awards ==
The following players received awards at the end of the season.

Award	Player	Team
Manager of the Year	(United States) Dave Garcia	Obregón
Most Valuable Player	(Mexico) Héctor Espino	Hermosillo
Rookie of the Year	(Mexico) Armando Lara	Mazatlán
