= Steve Bailey (baseball) =

American baseball player (born 1942)

- Pitcher
- Born: February 12, 1942 (age 84); Bronx, New York, U.S.
- Batted: Right Threw: Right

MLB debut
- April 14, 1967, for the Cleveland Indians

Last MLB appearance
- September 26, 1968, for the Cleveland Indians

MLB statistics
- Win–loss record: 2–6
- Earned run average: 3.88
- Innings: 69 2/3
- Stats at Baseball Reference

Teams
- Cleveland Indians (1967–1968)

Steven John Bailey (born February 12, 1942) is an American former professional baseball pitcher. He played for the Cleveland Indians from 1967 to 1968.

== Baseball career ==
During 1966, Bailey played for the Cleveland Indians-affiliated Pawtucket Indians. After playing with the Cleveland Indians during 1967, he was demoted mid-season to the Portland Beavers.

Bailey spent one season in the Mexican Pacific League with the Algodoneros de Guasave. On November 28, 1970, Bailey threw a no-hitter against the Ostioneros de Guaymas.
