= 2005 Caribbean Series =

2005 baseball tournament

The forty-seventh edition of the Caribbean Series (Serie del Caribe) was played in 2005. It was held from February 1 through February 6 featuring the champion baseball teams of the Dominican Republic, Águilas Cibaeñas; Mexico, Venados de Mazatlán; Puerto Rico, Indios de Mayagüez, and Venezuela, Tigres de Aragua. The Series was held at Estadio Teodoro Mariscal in Mazatlán, Mexico.

== Final standings ==
Country	Club	W	L	W/L %	Managers
Mexico	Venados de Mazatlán	5	1	.833	Juan José Pacho
Venezuela	Tigres de Aragua	3	3	.500	Buddy Bailey
Dominican Republic	Águilas Cibaeñas	3	3	.500	Félix Fermín
Puerto Rico	Indios de Mayagüez	1	5	.167	Mako Oliveras

== Individual leaders ==
Player	Statistic
Batting
Alex Cintrón (PUR)	Batting average	.500
Four tied	Runs	4
Miguel Flores (MEX)	Hits	11
Miguel Flores (MEX)	Doubles	3
Three tied	Triples	1
Jonny Gomes (MEX); Derrick White (MEX)	Home runs	2
Vinny Castilla (MEX); Derrick White (MEX)	RBI	5
Three tied	Stolen bases	2
Pitching
Francisco Campos (MEX)	Wins	2
Francisco Campos (MEX)	Strikeouts	23
Francisco Campos (MEX)	ERA	1.13
Francisco Campos (MEX)	Innings pitched	16.0
Elio Serrano (VEN); Luis Ayala (MEX)	Saves	1

== All-Star team ==
Name	Position
Alberto Castillo (DOM)	Catcher
Alex Cabrera (VEN)	First baseman
Miguel Flores (MEX)	Second baseman
Vinny Castilla (MEX)	Third baseman
Miguel Tejada (DOM)	Shortstop
Derrick White (MEX)	Left fielder
René Reyes (VEN)	Center fielder
Alex Romero (VEN)	Right fielder
Erubiel Durazo (MEX)	Designated hitter
Francisco Campos (MEX)	RH starting pitcher
Ricardo Palma (VEN)	LH starting pitcher
Luis Ayala (MEX)	Relief pitcher
Awards
Francisco Campos (MEX)	Most Valuable Player
Juan José Pacho (MEX)	Manager

== See also ==
- Ballplayers who have played in the Series

== Sources ==
- Latino Baseball (Spanish)
- Mexicano Francisco Campos fue el jugador más valioso (Spanish)
- Por quinta ocasión, México ganó la Serie del Caribe de beisbol (Spanish)
