= 2017 Caribbean Series =

2017 baseball tournament

The 2017 Caribbean Series (Serie del Caribe) was the 59th edition of the international competition featuring the champions of the Cuban National Series, Dominican Professional Baseball League, Mexican Pacific League, Puerto Rican Professional Baseball League, and Venezuelan Professional Baseball League. It took place from February 1 to 7, 2017 at the Nuevo Estadio Tomateros in Culiacán, Mexico.

Criollos de Caguas defeated hosts Águilas de Mexicali for the championship.

== Participating teams ==
Team	Means of qualification
(Cuba) Alazanes de Granma	Winners of the 2016–17 Cuban National Series
(Mexico) Águilas de Mexicali	Winners of the 2016–17 Mexican Pacific League
(Puerto Rico) Criollos de Caguas	Winners of the 2016–17 Puerto Rican Professional Baseball League
(Dominican Republic) Tigres del Licey	Winners of the 2016–17 Dominican Professional Baseball League
(Venezuela) Águilas del Zulia	Winners of the 2016–17 Venezuelan Professional Baseball League

== Preliminary round ==
Pos	Team	Pld	W	L	RF	RA	RD	PCT	GB	Qualification
1	(Venezuela) Águilas del Zulia	4	3	1	17	14	+3	.750 (Note: All three teams are tied in head-to-head record with 1–1. Águilas (V) has a team quality balance of +0.059, Águilas (M) has 0 and Alazanes has –0.059.)	—	Advance to knockout stage
2	(Mexico) Águilas de Mexicali (H)	4	3	1	16	9	+7	.750	—	Advance to knockout stage
3	(Cuba) Alazanes de Granma	4	3	1	17	9	+8	.750	—	Advance to knockout stage
4	(Puerto Rico) Criollos de Caguas	4	1	3	16	16	0	.250	2	Advance to knockout stage
5	(Dominican Republic) Tigres del Licey	4	0	4	7	25	−18	.000	3	

Source: MLB
Rules for classification: 1) Wins; 2) Head-to-head matches; 3) Team quality balance; 4) Batting average; 5) Drawing of lots.
(H) Hosts
Notes:

Time zone: Mexican Pacific Time (UTC–7)

Date	Time	Away	Result	Home	Stadium
February 1	15:00	Alazanes de Granma (Cuba)	4–0	(Dominican Republic) Tigres del Licey	Nuevo Estadio Tomateros
February 1	20:00	Criollos de Caguas (Puerto Rico)	2–4	(Mexico) Águilas de Mexicali	Nuevo Estadio Tomateros
February 2	15:00	Águilas del Zulia (Venezuela)	4–3	(Puerto Rico) Criollos de Caguas	Nuevo Estadio Tomateros
February 2	19:00	Águilas de Mexicali (Mexico)	7–2	(Dominican Republic) Tigres del Licey	Nuevo Estadio Tomateros
February 3	15:00	Criollos de Caguas (Puerto Rico)	1–6	(Cuba) Alazanes de Granma	Nuevo Estadio Tomateros
February 3	19:00	Águilas del Zulia (Venezuela)	1–5	(Mexico) Águilas de Mexicali	Nuevo Estadio Tomateros
February 4	13:00	Tigres del Licey (Dominican Republic)	2–10	(Puerto Rico) Criollos de Caguas	Nuevo Estadio Tomateros
February 4	17:00	Alazanes de Granma (Cuba)	3–8	(Venezuela) Águilas del Zulia	Nuevo Estadio Tomateros
February 5	13:00	Tigres del Licey (Dominican Republic)	3–4	(Venezuela) Águilas del Zulia	Nuevo Estadio Tomateros
February 5	17:00	Águilas de Mexicali (Mexico)	0–4	(Cuba) Alazanes de Granma	Nuevo Estadio Tomateros

== Knockout stage ==
Semi-finals
4	(Puerto Rico) Criollos de Caguas	9
1	(Venezuela) Águilas del Zulia	6
3	(Cuba) Alazanes de Granma	0
2	(Mexico) Águilas de Mexicali	1

Final
(Puerto Rico) Criollos de Caguas	1
(Mexico) Águilas de Mexicali	0

=== Semi-finals ===
Date	Time	Away	Result	Home	Stadium
February 6	13:00	Criollos de Caguas (Puerto Rico)	9–6	(Venezuela) Águilas del Zulia	Nuevo Estadio Tomateros
February 6	17:00	Alazanes de Granma (Cuba)	0–1	(Mexico) Águilas de Mexicali	Nuevo Estadio Tomateros

=== Final ===
February 7, 2017 19:00 at Nuevo Estadio Tomateros in Culiacán, Mexico
Team	1	2	3	4	5	6	7	8	9	10	R	H	E
(Puerto Rico) Criollos de Caguas	0	0	0	0	0	0	0	0	0	1	1	7	1
(Mexico) Águilas de Mexicali	0	0	0	0	0	0	0	0	0	0	0	4	1
WP: Miguel Mejía (1–0) LP: Jake Sanchez (0–1)
