= Noé Muñoz =

Mexican baseball player (born 1970)

- Catcher
- Born: December 3, 1970 (age 55); Ecatepec, State of Mexico, Mexico
- Batted: Right Threw: Right

MLB debut
- April 30, 1995, for the Los Angeles Dodgers

Last MLB appearance
- May 14, 1995, for the Los Angeles Dodgers

MLB statistics
- Batting average: .000
- Games played: 2
- At bats: 1
- Stats at Baseball Reference

Teams
- Los Angeles Dodgers (1995)

Member of the Mexican Professional

Baseball Hall of Fame
- Induction: 2023
Medals
Men's baseball
Representing Mexico
Pan American Games
Bronze medal – third place	2003 Santo Domingo	Team
Bronze medal – third place	2007 Rio de Janeiro	Team

Noé Muñoz (born December 3, 1970) is a Mexican former professional baseball catcher. He played in Major League Baseball (MLB) for the Los Angeles Dodgers in 1995.

== Playing career ==
Muñoz played in two games for the Los Angeles Dodgers during the 1995 season. Muñoz has had an extensive career in the Mexican League, last playing for the Saraperos de Saltillo over the 1999–2014 seasons. He played for the Mexico national team in the 2008 Americas Baseball Cup.

His number 28 was retired by the Saraperos de Saltillo of the Mexican League and the Algodoneros de Guasave of the Mexican Pacific League.

== Coaching career ==
On November 22, 2011 Muñoz was appointed as manager of the Cañeros de Los Mochis of the Mexican Pacific League.

On December 17, 2014, Muñoz was hired as part of the coaching staff for the Saraperos de Saltillo of the Mexican League. On October 29, 2015, he was appointed as manager of the Saraperos. He was dismissed on June 30, 2016 after leaving the team in the last position of the North Zone with a 32–40 record; he was replaced by Francisco Estrada, who in turn had replaced interim manager Fernando Elizondo.

In 2018, Muñoz was as the first base coach for the Bravos de León of the Mexican League.

On June 2, 2022, Muñoz was hired to serve as the bench coach for the Saraperos de Saltillo of the Mexican League. On February 19, 2024, Muñoz was fired by the Saraperos.
