= Estadio General Ángel Flores =

Stadium in Culiacán, Mexico

Coordinates: 24°47′54.65″N 107°23′22.14″W

Estadio Ángel Flores
- La Fortaleza Guinda
- Interactive map of Estadio Ángel Flores
- Full name: Estadio General Ángel Flores
- Location: Culiacán, Sinaloa
- Owner: Tomateros de Culiacán
- Operator: Tomateros de Culiacán
- Capacity: Concerts: 24,000; Baseball: 16,000
- Surface: Grass
- Field size: Baseball: LF: 290 feet (88 m), CF: 385 feet (117 m), RF: 305 feet (93 m)

Construction
- Opened: 1948
- Closed: January 5, 2014

Tenants
- Tomateros de Culiacán (LMP) (1965–2015); Tacuarineros de Culiacán (LCP) (1948–1958)

Estadio General Ángel Flores was a stadium in Culiacán, Mexico. It was primarily used for baseball and served as the home stadium for Tomateros de Culiacán. It also hosted the 2001 Caribbean Series. The stadium opened in 1948 and demolition of the structure began and was completed in January 2015, right after the final game where Tomateros defeated Charros de Jalisco to win 2014–15 season title. The Tomateros now play in the New Tomateros Stadium, with a capacity of 19,200, which was ready for the 2015–16 season.
