= Kuroda Park =

Stadium in Guasave, Mexico

Coordinates: 25°34′53.03″N 108°28′33.36″W

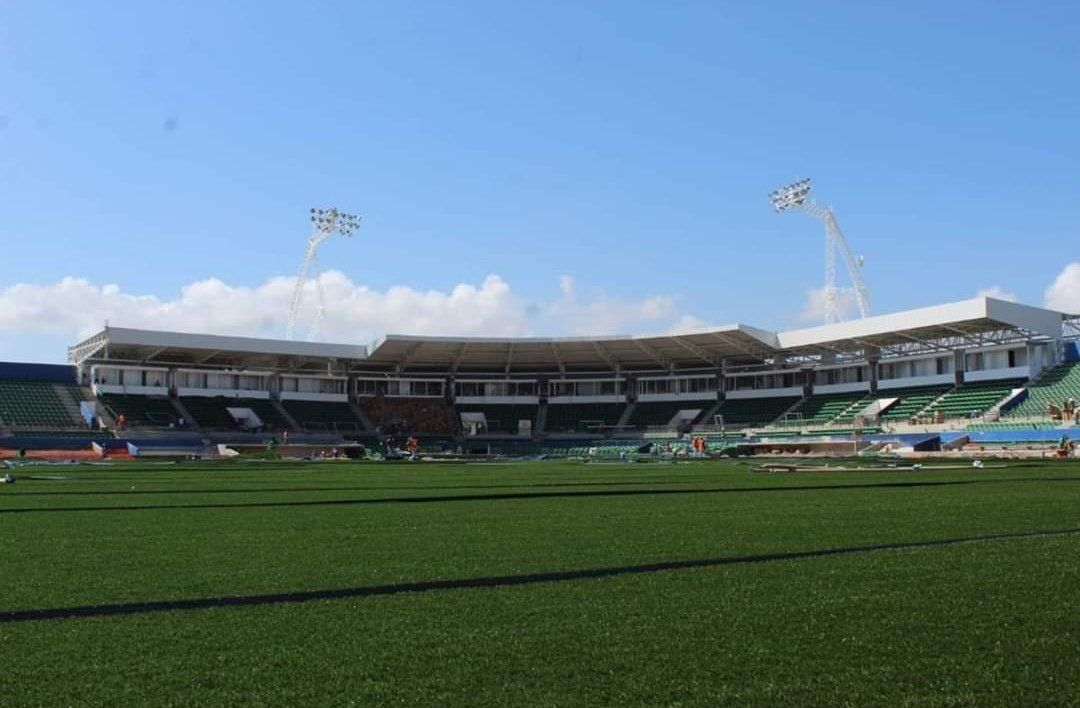
- Kuroda Park
- Interactive map of Kuroda Park
- Full name: Kuroda Park
- Former names: Estadio Francisco Carranza Limón (1970–2021)
- Location: Guasave, Sinaloa
- Owner: Algodoneros de Guasave
- Operator: Algodoneros de Guasave
- Capacity: Baseball: 8,500
- Surface: Grass

Construction
- Opened: 1970

Tenant
- Algodoneros de Guasave (LMP) 1970–present

Kuroda Park is a stadium in Guasave, Mexico. It is primarily used for baseball and serves as the home stadium for Algodoneros de Guasave of the Mexican Pacific League. The stadium has a capacity of 8,500 people.

On 25 August 2021, the Algodoneros announced that the stadium would be renamed Kuroda Park following a three-year naming rights agreement with Sinaloa-based Grupo Kuroda.
