= Irving Lopez =

Mexican baseball player (born 1995)

Charros de Jalisco – No. 18
- Infielder
- Born: June 30, 1995 (age 30); Hermosillo, Mexico
- Bats: Left Throws: Right

MLB debut
- September 23, 2023, for the St. Louis Cardinals

MLB statistics (through 2023 season)
- Batting average: .000
- Home runs: 0
- Runs batted in: 1
- Stats at Baseball Reference

Teams
- St. Louis Cardinals (2023)

Irving Lopez (born June 30, 1995) is a Mexican professional baseball infielder for the Charros de Jalisco of the Mexican League. He has previously played in Major League Baseball (MLB) for the St. Louis Cardinals.

== Early life ==
Lopez was born June 30, 1995, in Hermosillo, Mexico. He attended Florida International University.

== Career ==
=== St. Louis Cardinals ===
Lopez was drafted by the St. Louis Cardinals in the 19th round, with the 574th overall selection, of the 2017 Major League Baseball draft. He spent his first professional season with the rookie-level Johnson City Cardinals, where he hit .287 in 50 games, and also played in one game for the Low-A State College Spikes.

Lopez split the 2018 season between the Single-A Peoria Chiefs and High-A Palm Beach Cardinals. In 110 total games, he hit a combined .280/.368/.395 with 6 home runs and 48 RBI. In 2019, he played for the Double-A Springfield Cardinals and Triple-A Memphis Redbirds, appearing in 105 games and hitting .262/.340/.437 with a career–high 11 home runs and 35 RBI. Lopez did not play in a game in 2020 due to the cancellation of the minor league season because of the COVID-19 pandemic.

He returned to action in 2021, playing in 80 games for Springfield and Memphis and slashing .233/.294/.341 with 3 home runs and 26 RBI. He again returned to Springfield and Memphis in 2022, playing in 63 games and hitting .296/.386/.396 with 2 home runs and 22 RBI. In 2023, Lopez played in 97 games split between Springfield and Memphis, batting a cumulative .260/.368/.420 with 9 home runs and 53 RBI.

On September 22, 2023, Lopez was selected to the 40-man roster and promoted to the major leagues for the first time. In 5 games for St. Louis, he went hitless in 11 at–bats, with one RBI. Following the season on October 26, Lopez was removed from the 40–man roster and sent outright to Triple–A Memphis. He became a free agent following the season on November 6.

=== Pericos de Puebla ===
On June 14, 2024, Lopez signed with the Pericos de Puebla of the Mexican League. In 19 games for the Pericos, he slashed .211/.224/.298 with one home run and four RBI.

=== Charros de Jalisco ===
On February 4, 2025, Lopez was traded to the Rieleros de Aguascalientes in exchange for Fabián Anguamea. On April 8, Lopez was traded to the Charros de Jalisco. In 27 games he hit .284/.356/.432 with 2 home runs and 14 RBIs.
