= Estadio Tomateros =

Stadium in Culiacán, Mexico

Estadio de los Tomateros de Culiacán
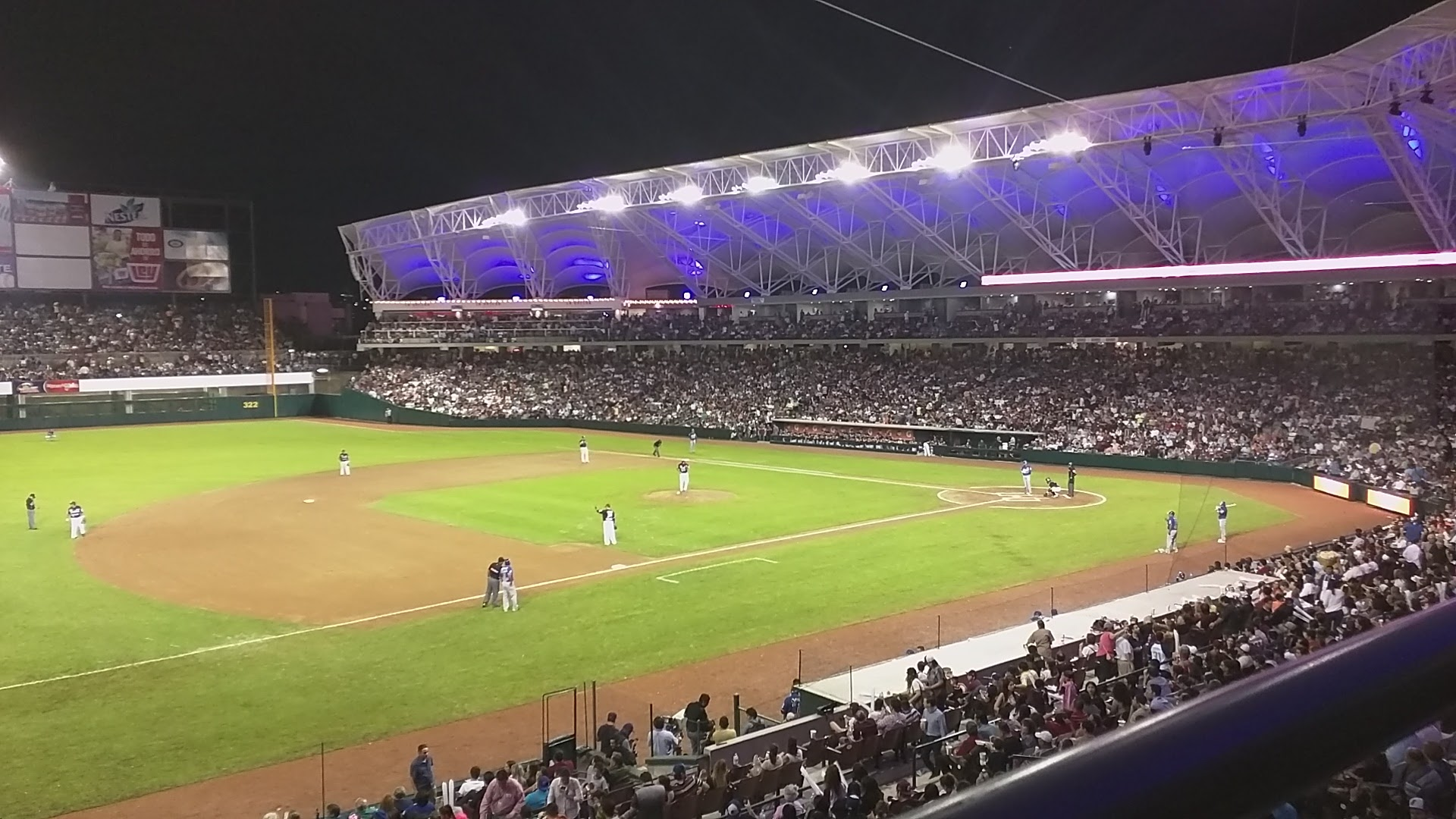
- Interactive map of Estadio de los Tomateros de Culiacán
- Full name: Estadio de los Tomateros de Culiacán
- Location: Culiacán, Sinaloa
- Coordinates: 24°47′56.38″N 107°23′26.89″W
- Owner: Tomateros de Culiacán
- Operator: Tomateros de Culiacán
- Capacity: 20,000
- Surface: Grass
- Field size: LF: 322 feet (98 m), CF: 410 feet (120 m), RF: 322 feet (98 m)

Construction
- Built: 2013 - 2015
- Opened: October 9, 2015
- Cost: MXN$305 million

Tenant
- Tomateros de Culiacán (LMP) (2015–present)

Website
- http://www.tomateros.com.mx/index.php/estadio

Estadio Tomateros is a professional baseball stadium in Culiacán, Mexico, it is home to the Tomateros de Culiacán of the Mexican Pacific League. The stadium replaced Estadio General Ángel Flores as home of Tomateros. It has also hosted the 2017 Caribbean Series. It is considered to be one of the premiere baseball stadiums in all of Latin America.

On July 17, 2013, it was announced the construction for a new baseball stadium in Culiacán, the new home of Tomateros de Culiacán, the stadium has a capacity of 20,000 and has several amenities for the fans including a high definition video display with measures approximately 36 feet (11m) high by 108 feet (33m) wide. The Tomateros won their first championship in the new stadium on January 30, 2020.

== See also ==
- List of stadiums in Mexico
- Lists of stadiums
