= Chico García =

Mexican baseball player (1924–2007)

- Second baseman
- Born: 24 December 1924; Veracruz City, Veracruz, Mexico
- Died: 17 August 2007 (aged 82); Monterrey, Nuevo León, Mexico
- Batted: Right Threw: Right

MLB debut
- April 24, 1954, for the Baltimore Orioles

Last MLB appearance
- September 20, 1954, for the Baltimore Orioles

MLB statistics
- Batting average: .113
- Home runs: 0
- Runs batted in: 5
- Stats at Baseball Reference

Teams
- Baltimore Orioles (1954)

Member of the Mexican Professional

Baseball Hall of Fame
- Induction: 1981

Vinicio "Chico" García Uzcanga (24 December 1924 – 17 August 2007) was a Mexican professional baseball second baseman and manager. He played in Major League Baseball for the Baltimore Orioles during the 1954 season. Listed at 5' 8", 170 lb., García batted and threw right-handed. He was born in Veracruz City, Mexico.

Outside of MLB, García enjoyed a distinguished baseball career that spanned five different decades, first as a player from 1946 to 1970, then as manager from 1966 to 1984. In the Mexican League, he played most of his career with Rojos del Águila de Veracruz and Sultanes de Monterrey.

== Career ==
A solid infielder and contact hitter, García played with his hometown Industriales de Monterrey in the first Interamerican Series in 1946. He played nine Triple-A seasons in the Arizona-Texas and American Association leagues and one season in Cuban baseball, before serving as a backup infielder for the Orioles in the American League. He won four minor league batting titles in the Arizona-Texas League (1949), Mexican Gulf League (1950, 1951) and Mexican League (1963).

Following his playing career, García managed in Mexico from 1966 through 1984, winning four championship titles in the Mexican Pacific League (LMP) for Tomateros de Culiacán in 1966–67 and 1969–70, Algodoneros de Guasave in 1971–72 and Cañeros de Los Mochis in 1983–84. García ranks as the second most winning manager of the LMP and it is the only manager to have won Mexican Pacific League titles with three different franchises.

He also managed Monterrey, Veracruz, Sabinas, Jalisco, Monclova and Nuevo Laredo in the Mexican League. In 1981, he gained Mexican Baseball Hall of Fame honors.

Vinicio Garcia was married to Carolyn Foshee (who died in 1995) and has two sons, Jerry Vinicio and David and also has two daughters, Becky and Carolyn Lee.

García died on 16 August 2007 in Monterrey, Nuevo León, Mexico at age 82.

== Highlights ==
- 1949 - Led Arizona-Texas League in runs, hits, triples and batting average (.377).
- 1963 - At 38 age, won his second batting title in the Mexican League (.368) and hit a career-high 21 home runs.
- His minor league career totals show a .306 average over 2,803 games.
- As a second baseman for the Baltimore Orioles he played 39 games and his batting stats are: 62 AB, 6 R, 7 H, 2 3B, 5 RBI, 8 BB, 3 SO, 1 SF, 0.113 Avg., 0.211 OBP, 0.177 SLG.
- Fielding stats: 245 G, 105 TC, 4.4 TC/G, 101 CH, 57 PO, 44 A, 4 E, 15 DP, 0.962 FLD %.
- He coached the Mexican League team Sultanes de Monterrey for 260 games, reaching a winning percentage of .430 in three seasons.
- The number he used with the Sultanes de Monterrey team from 1965-1965 & 1970 was retired on 06/11/1999.
- He is the Sultanes player with most All-Star games played with this team (14).
- He is the title second baseman in the All-Time players team of the Sultanes de Monterrey.
- With the Sultanes de Monterrey 4 times was top scorer and 2B batter, three times leader in batting, two times in games played and hits batted and one time lead the team in times at bat and home runs.
- Was inducted in the Mexico Hall of Fame of Baseball in 1981, the 14th Sultanes player in the Mexican HOF.
