= Tacuarineros de Culiacán =

Mexican defunct baseball team

Information
- League: Mexican Pacific Coast League (1945–1958)
- Location: Culiacán, Sinaloa
- Ballpark: Estadio General Ángel Flores (1948–1958)
- Founded: 1945
- Folded: 1958
- League championships: 5 (1949, 1950, 1951, 1952, 1956)
- Former ballpark: Estadio Universitario (1945–1948)
- Manager: Manuel Arroyo

The Tacuarineros de Culiacán baseball club was one of the four original founding members of the Mexican Pacific Coast League, a league that operated in Mexico in the seasons from 1945–46 through 1957–58; it was later rebranded as the Liga Invernal Sonora-Sinaloa that would become the current Mexican Pacific League (LMP). They were managed by Manuel Arroyo.

The Tacuarineros were based in Culiacán, the capital of the state of Sinaloa, and played its home games in their first three seasons at the Estadio Universitario, owned by the Autonomous University of Sinaloa. They moved to the Estadio General Ángel Flores for the 1948–49 season, when they won the first of their five league championships, repeating in the 1949–50, 1950–51, 1951–52 and 1955–56 campaigns.

The name of the team came from the El Tacuarinero, a service of the Western Railway of Mexico inaugurated in 1883 that ran from Altata to Culiacán, with plans to reach as far as Durango City; however, those plans never materialized and the route terminated in Culiacán until 1975, when the service ended. The train was known as El Tacuarinero because of the people aboard the train who sold tacuarines, small pieces of hard bread made from corn.

== Championships ==
Season	Manager	Opponent	Series score	Record
1948–49	Manuel Arroyo	No final series		39–21–3
1949–50	Manuel Arroyo	Cañeros de Los Mochis	4–3	38–29
1950–51	Manuel Arroyo	No final series		20–10
1951–52	Manuel Arroyo	No final series		35–25
1955–56	Manuel Arroyo	No final series		33–23-1
Total championships			4	

== Achievements ==
=== League leaders ===
==== Batting champions ====
- 1945–46 – Manuel Arroyo (.375)

== Notable players ==
- Luke Easter : MPCL Most Valuable Player (1955–56)
- Johnny Ritchey : Tacuarineros Best Player (1953–54)
