= Mark Ballinger =

American baseball player (1949–2014)

- Pitcher
- Born: January 31, 1949; Glendale, California, U.S.
- Died: June 13, 2014 (aged 65); Okeechobee, Florida, U.S.
- Batted: Right Threw: Right

MLB debut
- August 8, 1971, for the Cleveland Indians

Last MLB appearance
- September 28, 1971, for the Cleveland Indians

MLB statistics
- Win–loss record: 1–2
- Earned run average: 4.67
- Strikeouts: 25
- Stats at Baseball Reference

Teams
- Cleveland Indians (1971)

Mark Alan Ballinger (January 31, 1949 – June 13, 2014) was an American Major League Baseball pitcher who appeared in 18 games, all in relief, for the 1971 Cleveland Indians. The right-hander stood 6 feet 6 inches (1.98 m) tall and weighed 205 pounds (93 kg), and entered professional baseball after Cleveland selected him in the second round of the 1967 Major League Baseball draft.

Over the next five seasons, Ballinger played in the Indians' farm system, gradually moving up the ranks. In 1971, he spent the season with the Jacksonville Suns, and went 5–10 with a 2.91 ERA before being promoted to the major league squad.

Ballinger worked in 34 2/3 innings during his two-month-long MLB career, giving up 30 hits and 13 bases on balls, while striking out 25. He recorded eight games finished, but no saves. Ballinger earned his only victory on August 28, 1971, with a stellar, four-inning relief appearance against the Minnesota Twins at Cleveland Stadium, allowing no hits and only one base on balls (to future Hall of Famer Rod Carew) and striking out three as the Indians rallied to win, 9–8, on a three-run home run by Vada Pinson.

He was demoted after the 1971 season, and spent two more seasons in the minors. After not playing in 1974, he spent the next five years alternating between the Suns and the Omaha Royals. His minor league career lasted all or parts of 12 seasons; he appeared in 260 games and won 54 of 115 decisions.

Ballinger also played winter baseball in the Mexican Pacific League with the Cañeros de Los Mochis and Mayos de Navojoa.
