= Estadio Tomás Oroz Gaytán =

Stadium in Ciudad Obregón, Mexico

Coordinates: 27°29′33.89″N 109°57′16.10″W

Estadio Tomás Oroz Gaytán was a stadium in Ciudad Obregón, Mexico. It was primarily used for baseball and served as the home stadium for Yaquis de Obregón. It holds 13,000 people.

The stadium was inaugurated on 12 July 1971. Yaquis player Joakim Soria pitched a perfect game against the Naranjeros de Hermosillo on 9 December 2006.

A new baseball venue, the Estadio Yaquis, was inaugurated on 12 October 2016, by then-governor of Sonora, Claudia Pavlovich Arellano. The Estadio Tomás Oroz Gaytán was purchased by the federal government in 2020 for more than MXN$400 million. It was subsequently remodeled and used as a baseball academy.
