= Juan José Pacho =

Mexican baseball player and manager

Piratas de Campeche – No. 1
- Shortstop / Manager
- Born: 8 April 1963; Oxkutzcab, Yucatán, Mexico
- Bats: Right Throws: Right

Teams
- Leones de Yucatán (1980, 1985–2002); Diablos Rojos del México (1984)

Member of the Mexican Professional

Baseball Hall of Fame
- Induction: 2009

Juan José Pacho Burgos (born 8 April 1963 in Oxkutzcab, Mexico), is a Mexican former baseball player and manager who currently serves as the bench coach for the Piratas de Campeche of the Mexican League.

== Career ==
Pacho played as a shortstop for the Mexican League. For 19 seasons, he played for the Leones de Yucatán, then in 1984 for the Diablos Rojos del México, from 1985 to 2002 he came back to Yucatán team.

Pacho's average was 0.278 in 1891 games. In 6370 turns to the bat, he produced 1768 hits, 202 doubles, 27 triples, 14 home runs, producing 528, scoring 806 and received 517 bases.

Pacho was member in his childhood of the Yucatan state team representing virtually every competition at national level, from teenager to young adult.

He mentioned once to newspapers: "in my village, there were only two things to do on Sundays, that is going to church and playing baseball".

In 2005, Pacho was the Manager of the Mexican team Venados de Mazatlán and the team under his leadership won the Caribbean Series beating the Águilas Cibaeñas from Dominican Republic.

In 2015, Juan Jose Pacho is the manager of the winter Mexican team Venados de Mazatlán and under his leadership won the 2016 Caribbean Series to the Tigres de Aragua from Venezuela.

In 2009, he was inducted into the Mexican Professional Baseball Hall of Fame for his achievements in baseball as a professional athlete.
