= Estadio Teodoro Mariscal =

Stadium in Mazatlán, Mexico

Coordinates: 23.2358723°N 106.4323417°W

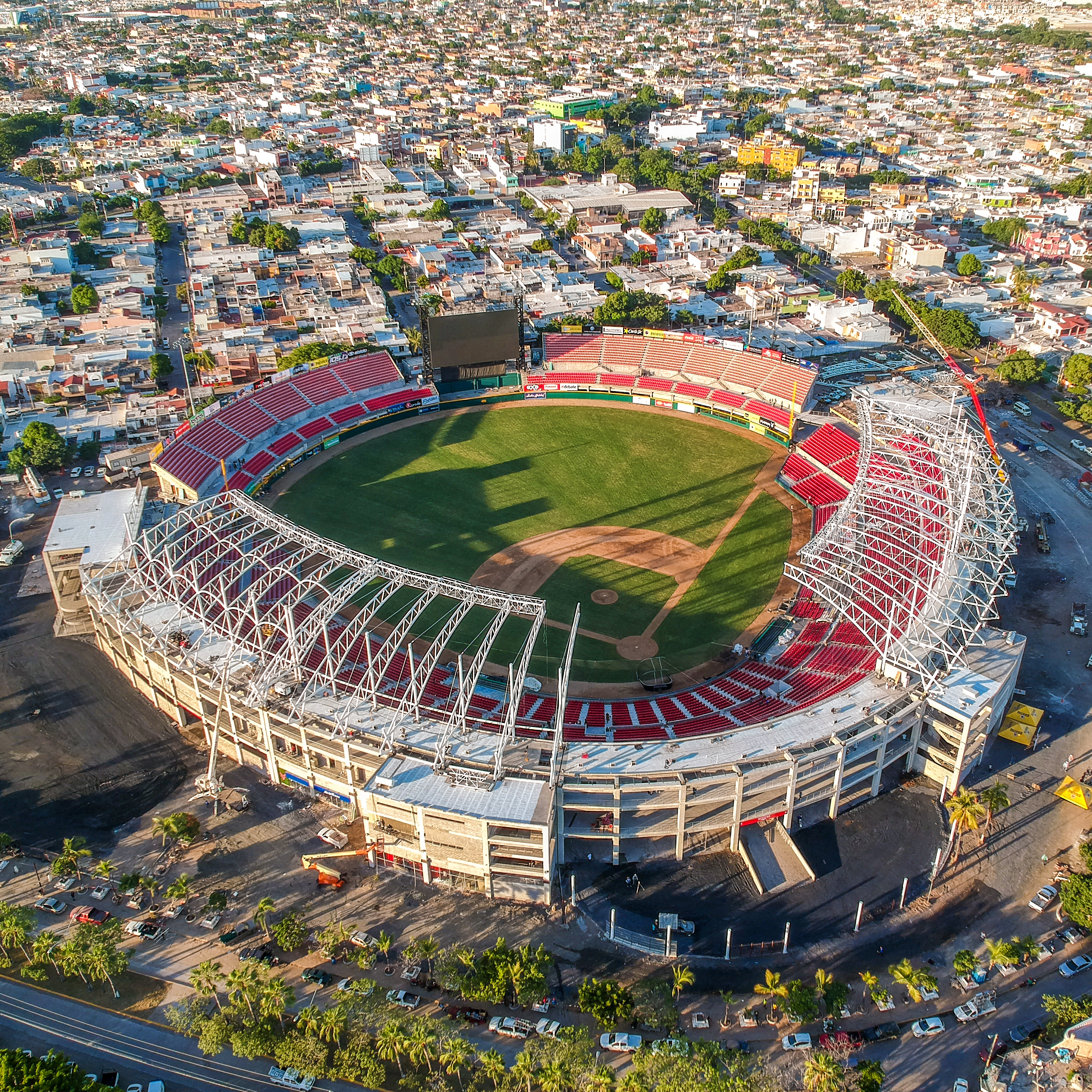
- Estadio Teodoro Mariscal in October 2018
- Interactive map of Estadio Teodoro Mariscal
- Location: Mazatlán, Mexico
- Owner: Venados de Mazatlán
- Operator: Venados de Mazatlán
- Capacity: 16,000
- Surface: Grass

Construction
- Opened: 1962
- Renovated: 2018

Tenants
- Venados de Mazatlán (LMP) (1962-present); Pacific F.C. (LPM) (2019)

The Estadio Teodoro Mariscal is a stadium in Mazatlán, Mexico.

It is primarily used for baseball and serves as the home stadium for Venados de Mazatlán. and it is the stadium in which Mexico won its first home Caribbean Series championship. The stadium has also hosted the Caribbean Series on five occasions; 1978, 1985, 1993, and 2005.

The stadium was built in 1962 and expanded in 2000. In 2018 was rebuilt and has a capacity of 16,000 spectators. Its dimensions are 325 feet on right and left field and to center field is 400 feet.

Between February and April 2019, the stadium was used for football, being the temporary ground of the Pacific F.C., which plays in the Liga Premier de México.
