= Fabián Anguamea =

Mexican baseball player (born 1993)

El Águila de Veracruz – No. 53
- Pitcher
- Born: December 21, 1993 (age 32); Ciudad Obregón, Sonora, Mexico
- Bats: Right Throws: Right

Jesús Fabián Anguamea (born December 21, 1993) is a Mexican professional baseball pitcher for El Águila de Veracruz of the Mexican League. He played for the Mexico national baseball team in the 2020 Summer Olympics.

== Career ==
=== Diablos Rojos del México ===
On June 5, 2013, Anguamea signed with the Diablos Rojos del México of the Mexican League. He made his professional debut that season, pitching in 10 games and recording a 5.73 ERA. The following season, Anguamea struggled to a 6.92 ERA in 8 games for the team. In 2015, he pitched to a 3.58 ERA in 22 appearances. The next year, Anguamea pitched in 17 games for México, logging an 0-1 record and 5.70 ERA with 26 strikeouts in 30.0 innings of work. For the 2017 season, Anguamea pitched to a 5-2 record and 4.29 ERA in 27 appearances. In 2018, Anguamea 23 games for the team, posting a 3-3 record with 61 strikeouts in 58 1/3 innings pitched. In 2019, he registered a 6.18 ERA in 31 games for the team. Anguamea did not play in a game in 2020 due to the cancellation of the Mexican League season because of the COVID-19 pandemic. In 7 games for the team in 2021, Anguamea struggled to a 10.00 ERA with 9 strikeouts in as many innings.

=== Tigres de Quintana Roo ===
On June 15, 2021, Anguamea was traded to the Tigres de Quintana Roo along with Octavio Acosta and Carlos De Leon in exchange for Luis Ivan Rodriguez. In 15 appearances, he recorded an 0.56 ERA with 11 strikeouts across 16.0 innings pitched.

In 2022, Anguamea pitched in 37 games for Quintana Roo, logging a 4.15 ERA with 37 strikeouts and 2 saves. He did not appear in a game in 2023, and was released by the team on March 11, 2024.

=== El Águila de Veracruz ===
On May 15, 2024, Anguamea signed with El Águila de Veracruz of the Mexican League. In 13 relief appearances, he logged a 5.68 ERA and 15 strikeouts over 12 2/3 innings.

=== Pericos de Puebla ===
On December 4, 2024, Anguamea was traded to the Rieleros de Aguascalientes of the Mexican League. On February 4, 2025, Anguamea was traded to the Pericos de Puebla in exchange for Irving Lopez. In four appearances for Puebla, he struggled to a 9.64 ERA with one strikeout across 4 2/3 innings pitched. Anguamea was released by the Pericos on May 1.

=== El Águila de Veracruz (second stint) ===
On May 24, 2025, Anguamea signed with El Águila de Veracruz of the Mexican League.

== International career ==
Anguamea was selected to the Mexico national baseball team for the 2020 Summer Olympics (contested in July 2021), as a replacement for Sammy Solís, who tested positive for COVID-19.
