= Ronnie Camacho =

Mexican baseball player and manager

Ronaldo Camacho

Municipal president of Empalme
- In office 16 September 1982 – 15 September 1985
- Preceded by: Marcial Bazúa Vizcarra
- Succeeded by: Heriberto Lizárraga Zataráin

Personal details
- Born: 26 October 1935 (age 91) Empalme, Sonora, Mexico
- Party: Institutional Revolutionary Party
- Baseball career
- First baseman / Manager
- Bats: Right Throws: Right

Career highlights and awards
- Mexican Pacific League records: 27 home runs, single season

Member of the Mexican Professional

Baseball Hall of Fame
- Induction: 1983

Ronaldo Camacho Durán (born 26 October 1935) is a Mexican former professional baseball first baseman and manager. Camacho played in the Mexican League, the highest level of professional baseball in Mexico, the Mexican Pacific League and in the minor leagues.

He had a brief career as politician in the eighties as municipal president of his hometown.

== Career ==
Camacho was born on 26 October 1935 in Empalme, Sonora, Mexico. He started his professional career in 1953 playing for the Águilas de Mexicali in the Mexican winter league. He also played minor league baseball with the Fresno Cardinals from 1953 to 1955.

In 1956, Camacho returned to Mexico and signed with the Tecolotes de Nuevo Laredo of the Mexican League. Camacho played for the Tecolotes from 1956 to 1959, then joined the Pericos de Puebla where he stayed until 1969. In 1970, Camacho was signed by the Leones de Yucatán, where he played for only one season. In 1971, he joined the Broncos de Reynosa. From 1972 to 1974, Camacho played with the Tigres de México. On his last season, in 1975, he played with the Rieleros de Aguascalientes. Camacho also spent some games with the Rojos del Águila de Veracruz in 1973.

Camacho became the first and only player to establish a single season home run record in both Mexican professional leagues. In 1963, Camacho hit 39 home runs in the Mexican League. In the 1963–64 Mexican Pacific League season, Camacho hit 27 home runs. His record in the Mexican League was beaten the next year by Héctor Espino, who hit 46 home runs with the Sultanes de Monterrey. His record in the Mexican Pacific League remains unbeaten as of 2022.

In 1983, Camacho was inducted into the Mexican Professional Baseball Hall of Fame.

Each season, the Mexican Pacific League awards the Ronaldo "Ronnie" Camacho Trophy to the home run leader of the league, named in honor of Camacho.

== Political career ==
Camacho was elected as municipal president of his hometown Empalme from 16 September 1982 to 15 September 1985.
