= Estadio Yaquis =

Stadium in Ciudad Obregón, Mexico

Coordinates: 27.527479°N 109.950403°W

The Estadio Yaquis is a stadium in Ciudad Obregón, Mexico. It is primarily used for baseball and serves as the home stadium for Yaquis de Obregón. It holds 16,000 people. The construction of the venue started in 2014, and it opened in 2016.

The project and the design were carried out by Gómez Vázquez International (GVI), a company led by architect Jose Manuel Gomez Vazquez Aldana, while the construction was made by Dynfra, Infraestructura Inteligente.

It was inaugurated on 12 October 2016, by then-governor of Sonora, Claudia Pavlovich Arellano.
