= Vicente Romo =

Mexican baseball player (born 1943)

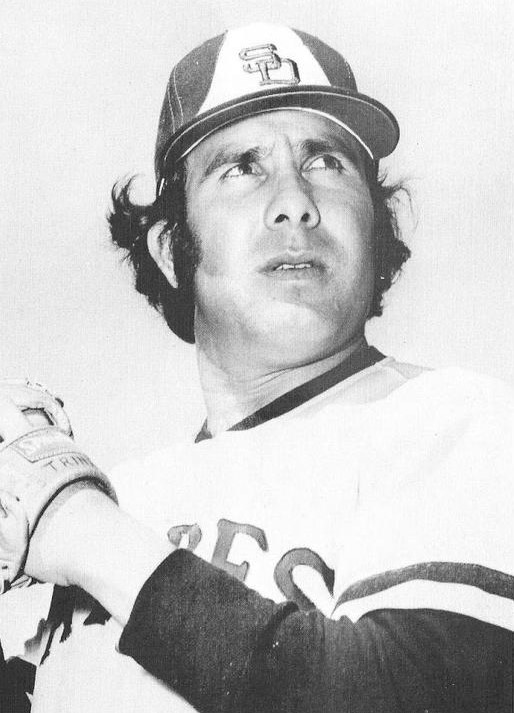
- Pitcher
- Born: April 12, 1943 (age 83); Santa Rosalía, Baja California Sur, Mexico
- Batted: Right Threw: Right

MLB debut
- April 11, 1968, for the Los Angeles Dodgers

Last MLB appearance
- July 27, 1982, for the Los Angeles Dodgers

MLB statistics
- Win–loss record: 32–33
- Earned run average: 3.36
- Strikeouts: 416
- Saves: 51
- Stats at Baseball Reference

Teams
- Los Angeles Dodgers (1968); Cleveland Indians (1968–1969); Boston Red Sox (1969–1970); Chicago White Sox (1971–1972); San Diego Padres (1973–1974); Los Angeles Dodgers (1982)

Career highlights and awards
- Mexican League Rookie of the Year Award (1963)

Member of the Mexican Professional

Baseball Hall of Fame
- Induction: 1992

Vicente Romo Navarro (born April 12, 1943) is a Mexican former professional baseball pitcher. A right-hander, Romo played all or parts of eight seasons in Major League Baseball (MLB) between 1968 and 1982, primarily as a relief pitcher. He had an extensive career in Mexico, where his career spanned 25 seasons from 1962–86, and he was elected to the Salón de la Fama del Beisbol Profesional de México (the Mexican Professional Baseball Hall of Fame) in 1992. He is the older brother of fellow major league pitcher Enrique Romo.

== Early life ==
Romo was born on April 12, 1943, in Santa Rosalía, Baja California Sur, Mexico, but the family later moved to Guaymas, Sonora, Mexico. He was nicknamed "Huevo" (meaning egg in Spanish) as a small child. His father Santos had been a professional boxer. He played soccer and volleyball as a youth, but at 16-years old became a third baseman for an amateur baseball team. His younger brother Enrique also played Mexican League baseball and would also go on to pitch in the major leagues.

== Professional career ==
=== Minor leagues ===
Romo, who continued to carry the nickname Huevo throughout his career, began his professional career with the Tigres de Aguascalientes in the now-defunct Mexican Center League in 1962. He pitched for the Double-A Tigres del México of the Mexican League in 1963–64, under Hector Barnetche. Romo was 28–18 during those two years, and won 16 games in 1964. On October 5, 1964, the American League (AL) Cleveland Indians purchased his contract rights from the Tigres.

In 1965, Cleveland assigned Romo to its Triple-A affiliate, the Portland Beavers, of the Pacific Coast League (PCL). He pitched in 28 games, starting seven, with a 4.50 earned run average (ERA) and 2–5 won-loss record. He had a sore muscle in his pitching arm that year, and could not throw his curve ball.

He returned to the Tigres in 1966, where he had a 17–7 record, 2.41 ERA and 206 strikeouts in 220 innings pitched; starting 27 of the 38 games in which he pitched. One of his teammates was the 45-year old Warren Spahn, a future Baseball Hall of Fame pitching inductee. He made the Indians spring training roster in 1967, but was returned to Portland in 1967, where he had a 3–11 record and 4.15 ERA, and again started the majority of games in which he pitched.

Romo had been so upset by his poor play for Portland at one point, that he was going to give up on playing in the United States. However, future MLB manager and personal friend Preston Gomez convinced Romo to continue pursuing a professional baseball career in the United states.

=== Rookie year ===
After three seasons in the minor leagues, mostly with the Portland Beavers, Romo was selected in the November 1967 Rule 5 draft by the National League (NL) Los Angeles Dodgers, who paid $25,000. The Dodgers had earlier tried purchasing his contract rights in 1966 from the Tigres for $30,000, but then learned Cleveland held those rights. He made his major league debut in the second game of the 1968 season (April 11, 1968), pitching one inning against the New York Mets, and giving up one run. This was his only appearance for the Dodgers in 1968. After going two weeks without appearing in a game, Romo was returned to the Indians on April 26, and assigned to Portland, who paid $12,500 for Romo's rights.

Romo pitched in 10 games for Portland (starting eight), with a 4–3 record and 3.16 ERA. The Indians recalled him at the end of June. During the last three months of the season, Romo appeared in 40 games for the Indians (39 in relief), posting a team-best 12 saves and a 1.62 earned run average. He was tied for fourth best in the AL for saves. Cleveland tied with the Baltimore Orioles for the AL's best team ERA (2.66).

=== Boston Red Sox ===
After making three relief appearances for Cleveland in April 1969, Romo was traded along with Sonny Siebert and Joe Azcue from the Indians to the Boston Red Sox for Ken Harrelson, Dick Ellsworth and Juan Pizarro on April 19, 1969. After joining the Red Sox, he saved nine of the team's next 24 wins. In Boston, he shared closer duties with left-hander Sparky Lyle for most of the year, but was moved to the starting rotation on August 2, 1969 against the Oakland A's.

He made 11 starts down the stretch, posting a 5–2 record, including his only career shutout on September 18 against the 1969 AL champion Baltimore Orioles (who had the second highest team batting average and second most runs scored in the AL in 1969). Overall, he went 7–9 with 11 saves, a 3.18 ERA, four complete games as a starter and 27 games finished as a reliever for the Red Sox. Lyle pitched 71 games in relief, finished 44 games and had 17 saves.

Romo began the 1970 season back in the bullpen, occasionally being called upon to make a spot start. In an April 27 start against the Oakland A's, he defeated future Hall of Fame pitcher Catfish Hunter, 4–3; his only win as a starter that year. He started his next game on May 2, without a decision.

In late July, he was moved back to the starting rotation once more, but this time did not fare as well overall as in 1969. In eight starts, Romo went 0–3 with a 6.56 ERA, and he was moved back to the bullpen in September. Overall, he finished the season 7–3 with a 4.08 ERA. He started 10 games with no complete games, relieved 38 games, finishing 15, and had six saves. He was 1–3 as a starter with a 6.10 ERA on the season, and 6–0 as a relief pitcher with a 2.43 ERA.

=== White Sox and Padres ===
In 1971, Romo was traded at the end of spring training with Tony Muser to the Chicago White Sox, for Duane Josephson and Danny Murphy. Romo spent two seasons as a middle reliever, though he occasionally was a starter and finished some games in relief. In 1971, Romo appeared in 45 games, starting two, finishing 16, with five saves, a 1–7 record and 3.38 ERA. Romo began the 1972 season with a 3–0 record and 2.93 ERA in 46 innings, until being placed on the disabled list in late July with a sore arm. He returned in early September, but pitched less than six innings over the remainder of the season. Overall in 1972, he pitched 28 games in relief, finished eight, with one save and a 3.31 ERA.

He was traded again after the 1972 season to the San Diego Padres for Johnny Jeter, where he became the first Mexican-born player in team history. With the Padres, he was given a few more opportunities to close. In 1973, he pitched 48 of his 49 games in relief, finishing 23 games, with a 3.70 ERA and seven saves. In 1974, he pitched 53 of his 54 games in relief, finishing 35, and leading the team in saves with nine, with a 4.56 ERA. Despite that, he was released by the Padres during spring training in 1975. The Padres played poorly as a team both seasons, finishing with identical 60–102 last-place records.

=== Return to Mexico ===
Romo returned to his native Mexico, signing with the Cafeteros de Córdoba. He pitched four seasons with Córdoba, then three more with the Azules de Coatzacoalcos. His contract was purchased from Coatzacoalcos by the St. Louis Cardinals after the 1981 season, but was returned to the Azules before the 1982 season.

=== MLB comeback ===
On May 24, 1982, Romo's contract was again purchased, this time by his original major league team, the Dodgers. Four days later, Romo made his first major league appearance in eight years, pitching two shutout innings against the Chicago Cubs. He was moved into the starting rotation in June to replace the injured Burt Hooton, but struggled, going 0–1 with a 5.40 ERA in his first four starts.

After one relief appearance, he pitched seven scoreless innings against the Montreal Expos on July 19 for his first major league victory since 1974, and first as a starter since 1970. Unfortunately, in his next start against the San Francisco Giants, he suffered a leg injury in the second inning and missed the rest of the season. His contract was sold back to the Azules after the season. He went on to pitch four more seasons in Mexico, finishing his career with the Leones de Yucatán in 1986.

=== Overview ===
In an eight-season career, Romo posted a 32–33 record with a 3.36 ERA, 52 saves, and 416 strikeouts in 335 games pitched. In Mexico, he had a 182–106 record in 16 seasons, and holds the career record for best ERA with at least 2,000 innings pitched at 2.49. He also holds a number of Mexican Pacific League records.

== Honors ==
In 1992, Romo was inducted into the Mexican Professional Baseball Hall of Fame. In 2010, Romo and his brother Enrique had their uniform numbers retired by Yaquis de Obregón of the Mexican Winter League.

== Personal life ==
Romo worked as a mechanic in the off-season.

== See also ==
- List of players from Mexico in Major League Baseball
