= Héctor Espino =

Mexican baseball player and manager (1939–1997)

- Outfielder / First baseman
- Born: 6 June 1939; Chihuahua City, Chihuahua, Mexico
- Died: 7 September 1997 (aged 58); Monterrey, Nuevo León, Mexico
- Batted: Right Threw: Right
- Stats at Baseball Reference

Teams
- Naranjeros de Hermosillo (1960–1984); Sultanes de Monterrey (1962–1970, 1981–1984); Alijadores de Tampico (1971–1978); Cardenales de Tabasco (1975); Diablos Rojos del México (1975, 1981); Algodoneros de Unión Laguna (1979–1980); Bravos de León (1979); Saraperos de Saltillo (1980); Acereros de Monclova (1980, 1984)

Career highlights and awards
- Mexican League Rookie of the Year Award (1962); Mexican Pacific League records: .415 batting average, single season; 83 RBIs, single season

Member of the Mexican Professional

Baseball Hall of Fame
- Induction: 1988

Héctor "El Niño" Espino (6 June 1939 – 7 September 1997) was a Mexican professional outfielder, first baseman and manager. He has been called "The Mexican Babe Ruth". Born in Chihuahua, Chihuahua, Espino he played from 1960 through 1984 in both the Mexican summer league and the Mexican winter league. After amassing 484 career home runs, he is recognized as the all-time minor-league home run king. 481 of those homers came in Mexico.

== Mexican League career ==
Espino began his baseball career in 1960 with the Tuneros de San Luis Potosí of the Mexican Central League. In 63 games, he hit .362 with 20 HRs in just 229 at bats. A year later he played briefly for the Tuneros.

Espino entered the Liga Mexicana de Beisbol in 1962 with the Sultanes de Monterrey (Monterrey Sultans) as an outfielder and right-handed batter. He batted a .358 average with 23 home runs and 12 triples, driving in 105 runs (tying for the league lead) while scoring 106 times. He helped lead Monterrey to a league championship and was named Rookie of the Year.

In 1963, Espino missed some games due to an injury and his average dipped slightly to .346. In 99 games, he managed to hit 24 home runs and 80 runs batted in.

Espino moved from outfield to first base in 1964. Despite playing a new position, he won his first Mexican League batting title with a .371 average, adding 46 home runs, 115 runs, and 117 RBI. His run total was the third highest in Mexican League history, being surpassed only by Bobby Ávila and Cool Papa Bell. In addition, he set a new home run record, surpassing Ronnie Camacho's 39, and also set a record with 30 intentional walks, while his 332 total bases were second-best in league history. His impressive numbers drew the attention of the St. Louis Cardinals organization, who signed Espino late in the year and sent him to their AAA club, the Jacksonville Suns. Espino did well there, hitting .300 with three homers in 32 games, but he would never play outside the Mexican League again. Sources list several different reasons and Total Baseball reports that Espino himself gave different ones. Total Baseball says that Espino might have liked being a big fish in a small pond; some said homesickness; Mexican League writer Bruce Baskin says that racism discouraged Espino from playing in the US.

In 1965 the Cardinals invited Espino to spring training, but he did not report. Jamie Marshall writes that it was because Espino wanted a "fair share of the sale price." He hit .335 with 17 HR in just 67 games in the Mexican League that year.

Espino returned to full-time duty in 1966 and hit a league-leading .369, beating out Minnie Miñoso by 21 points. He finished second in the league with 31 homers and third with 91 walks despite missing two road series due to conflicts with his manager.

In 1967 and 1968 Espino repeated as batting champ with marks of .379 and .365, respectively. He hit 34 homers, slugged .706 and scored 106 runs in 1967, winning in 1968 his second home run title with 27. His fourth batting title tied Al Pinkston for the Mexican League record. In the late 1960s, the California Angels tried to sign Espino several times without success.

In 1969, after winning three straight batting titles, Espino's batting average fell to .304. He won another home run crown, leading the league with 37 homers. He also set a new single season record with 125 walks (this record would be broken the following year).

In 1970, Espino began a slight slump during his prime. He still hit .319, but only 18 home runs. The next year he moved to the Alijadores de Tampico (Tampico Lightermen), and hit .311 with a subpar 20 home runs and 58 RBI.

In 1972, Espino bounced back to a .356 average and clinched his fourth and final home run title (37). He also scored 101 runs and drove in 101 more, with a league-high 94 walks. In 1973 his average rose again, to .377, good to win his fifth and final Mexican League batting championship. He also drove in 107 runs and hit 22 homers; while it was 15 fewer than his previous season, the 34-year-old slugger would never again hit as many.

From 1974 through 1980, Espino remained in double digit homers, reaching 20 once, though he remained a .300 hitter through 1980 except for one .297 season.

In 1975 Espino helped lead Tampico to a Mexican league championship, while setting a league record for the most consecutive hits in 11 straight at-bats. His statistics declined drastically in his early forties, retiring in 1984 at the age of 45.

== Mexican winter league ==
Espino also had a significant career with the Naranjeros de Hermosillo (Hermosillo Orange Pickers) of the Liga Mexicana del Pacífico. During his 24 seasons in the circuit, he hit .329 with 299 home runs and 1029 RBI. In 1976, he led the Mexican entry to its first Caribbean Series win.

Overall, Espino won 13 batting crowns, six home run titles, and six Most Valuable Player awards. He is the only player in LMP history with a career average over .300. The runner up, Matias Carrillo, is 36 points behind Espino. He also played in six Caribbean Series, being named the Most Valuable Player in the 1974 and 1976 editions. In 1996, he gained induction into the Caribbean Baseball Hall of Fame as part of their first class.

== Managerial career ==
In 1990 and 1991 Espino managed the Monterrey Industriales, posting a 110–138 record In 248 games for a .444 winning percentage.

== Legacy and death ==
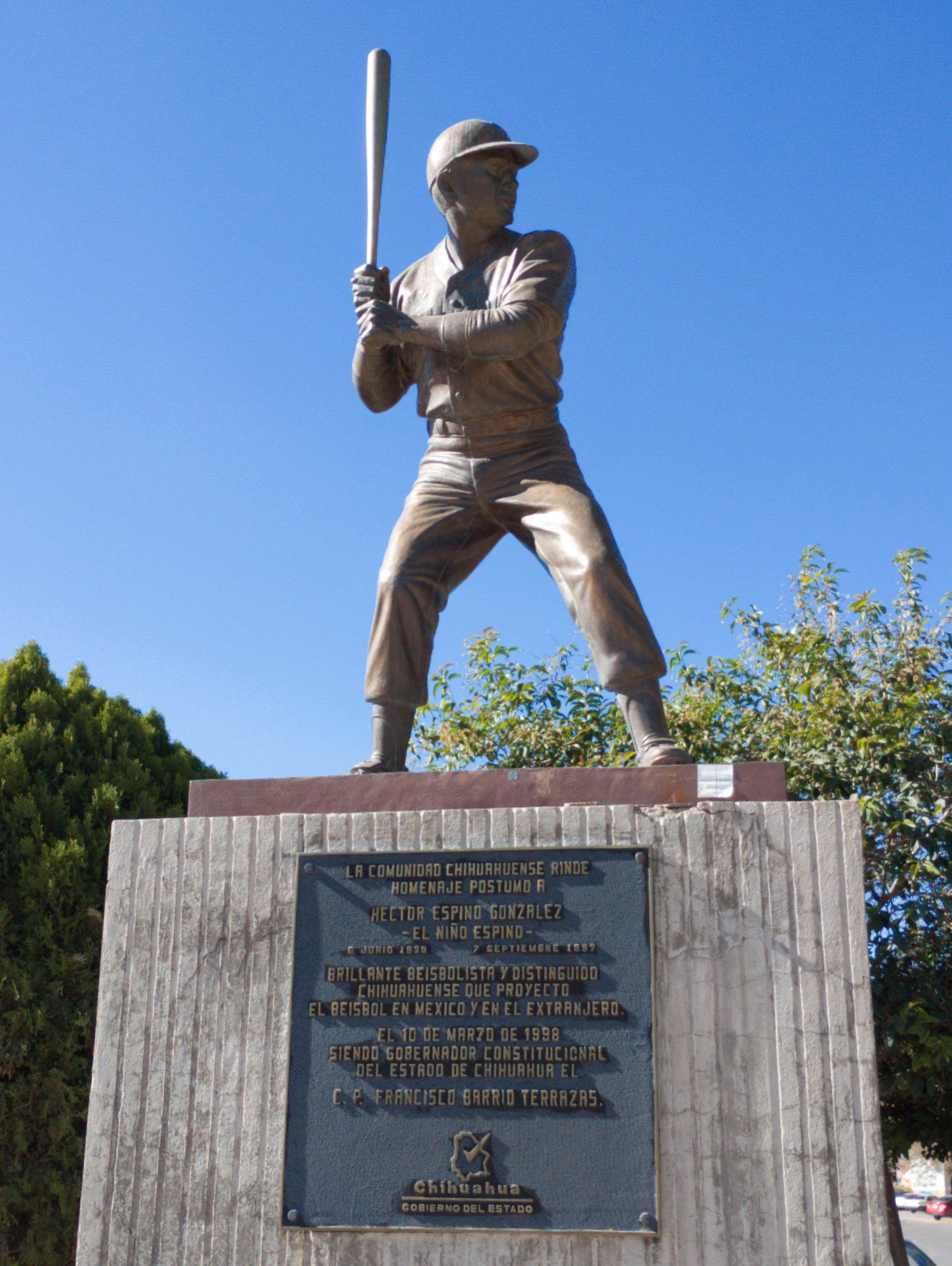
Statue of Héctor Espino in Chihuahua City.

When Espino retired from baseball in 1984, he had surpassed Buzz Arlett to finish his career as the all-time minor league home run king with a career total of 484 home runs. Over his 24-year Mexican League career, Espino played 2388 games, had 8205 at bats, scored 1505 runs, got 2752 hits, 373 doubles, 45 triples, 453 home runs, 1573 runs batted in, 54 stolen bases, and a .335 batting average. During the course of his career, he rejected contract offers from the St. Louis Cardinals, New York Mets, San Diego Padres, and California Angels, which helped him earn the nickname, "The Rebel of Chihuahua."

Since his retirement, most of Espino's baseball records have been broken, including his Mexican League season and career home run records. His all-time minor league home run title and his intentional walks records — 53 in a season (1969) and 408 career (over 200 more than #2 Barrera) — have not been approached.

In 1976, the baseball stadium in Hermosillo, El Coloso de Choyal, was named Estadio De Beisbol Héctor Espino in his honor. In 1988 he was selected for the Salón de la Fama del Beisbol Profesional de México (Mexican Baseball Hall of Fame).

Espino died in 1997 in Monterrey after suffering a heart attack.

His number 21 has been retired by all professional teams in the Mexican summer and winter leagues.

In 2020, Espino was selected as the first baseman on the Mexican League Historic Ideal Team by a committee of baseball journalists and historians.

In February 2025, Espino was selected by a committee of journalists as the first baseman for the Mexican League Centennial All-Time Team on the occasion of the league's hundredth anniversary.
