= Algodoneros de Guasave =

Logo	Cap insignia

Information
- League: Mexican Pacific League
- Location: Guasave, Sinaloa
- Ballpark: Kuroda Park
- Founded: 1970 (original); 2019 (modern incarnation)
- League championships: 1 (1972)
- Colors: Navy blue, sky blue, white
- Mascot: Coty (sheep)
- Retired numbers: 11; 28
- Manager: José Moreno
- Website: losalgodoneros.com

Current uniforms
Home	Away

The Algodoneros de Guasave (English: Guasave Cotton Growers) are a professional baseball team in the Mexican Pacific League (LMP) based in Guasave, Sinaloa. They won the league championship in 1972.

== History ==
In the late 1960s, a group from Guasave, Sinaloa, led by Jesús Félix Gastélum, worked to bring a professional baseball team to the city. Among their efforts was the construction of the Estadio Francisco Carranza Limón. In 1968, aware of Guasave’s efforts, the management of the Ostioneros de Guaymas contacted Félix Gastélum to offer him the franchise; however, the deal fell through. The Algodoneros de Guasave finally made their debut in the Mexican Pacific League (LMP) in the 1970–71 season.

The Algodoneros won their first (and, as of 2025, only) LMP championship in the 1971–72 season, just their second year in the league, by defeating the Tomateros de Culiacán 4–2 in the final series under manager by manager Vinicio García. A tragedy occurred during the season: Algodoneros outfielder Selman Jack died in December 1971 after an old wall collapsed on him.

The team represented Mexico in the 1972 Caribbean Series, where they had a poor performance, finishing last with a 1–5 record. The Algodoneros won their only game of the tournament against the Dominican representative, the Águilas Cibaeñas, shutting them out 10–0 in a game won by pitcher Thor Skogan, who also led the tournament with a 0.00 ERA.

On 29 November 1980, Rafael García threw a no-hitter against the Águilas de Mexicali, the 16th no-hitter in league history.

On 26 October 1993, the Algodoneros played what was then the longest game in league history, against the Venados de Mazatlán at Estadio Teodoro Mariscal; the game lasted 7 hours and 2 minutes over 22 innings, and concluded after midnight on 27 October. On 2 November 1993, Lorenzo Retes and Andrés Berumen combined to throw a no-hitter against the Águilas de Mexicali.

Prior to the beginning of the 2012–13 season, it was announced that the franchise would move to Tijuana; however, this move did not occur. In April 2014, the team was bought by a group of investors led by Armando Navarro. The franchise was moved to Guadalajara and began play in the 2014–15 season as the third incarnation of the Charros de Jalisco.

On 27 January 2019, during a rally at the Estadio Francisco Carranza Limón in Guasave, Mexican President Andrés Manuel López Obrador announced that the Algodoneros would return to compete in the Mexican Pacific League beginning in the 2019–20 season as a new expansion franchise. This new version of the Algodoneros would be one of two additions to the LMP, with the Sultanes de Monterrey (who also played in the summer-time Mexican League) being the other.

== Roster ==
Algodoneros de Guasave roster
Active roster		Coaches
Pitchers: 22 (Mexico) Fabián Anguamea; 82 (Mexico) Víctor Buelna; 18 (Mexico) Manuel Castro; 91 (Mexico) Rafael Córdova; 90 (Mexico) Norman Elenes; 62 (Mexico) Yosshel Hurtado; 27 (Mexico) Jeff Ibarra; 77 (Mexico) Iván Izaguirre; 67 (United States) Jorge Pérez; 27 (Mexico) Saúl Vázquez; 30 (Mexico) Carlos Vázquez	Catchers: 14 (Mexico) Carlos Garzón; Infielders: 10 (Mexico) Ángel Erro; 5 (Mexico) Jorge Flores; 61 (Mexico) Orlando Piña; Outfielders: 99 (United States) Drew Avans; 8 (Mexico) Leo Heras; 72 (Cuba) Víctor Labrada	Manager: (Venezuela) José Moreno; Coaches: (United States) Darryl Brinkley (hitting); (Mexico) Iván Cervantes (third base); (Venezuela) Roberto Espinoza (pitching); (Mexico) Ramón Orantes (bench); (Mexico) Javier Robles (first base); Roster updated on 14 October 2026

=== Retired numbers ===
The Algodoneros de Guasave have retired the following numbers:

- 11: Miguel Suárez
- 28: Noé Muñoz

== Championships ==
Season	Manager	Opponent	Series score	Record
1971–72	Vinicio García	Tomateros de Culiacán	4–2	46–34–4
Total championships			1	

== Caribbean Series record ==
Year	Venue	Finish	Wins	Losses	Win%	Manager
1972	(Dominican Republic) Santo Domingo	4th	1	5	.167	(Mexico) Vinicio García
Total			1	5	.167	
