= Yaquis de Obregón =

Mexican professional baseball team

Logo	Cap insignia

Information
- League: Mexican Pacific League
- Location: Ciudad Obregón, Sonora
- Ballpark: Estadio Yaquis
- Founded: 1970
- Caribbean Series championships: 2 (2011, 2013)
- League championships: 7 (1965–66, 1972–73, 1980–81, 2007–08, 2010–11, 2011–12, 2012–13)
- Former ballpark: Estadio Tomás Oroz Gaytán (1971–2015)
- Colors: Blue, sky blue and white
- Retired numbers: 4; 5; 9; 11; 12; 21; 24
- Ownership: Club de Baseball Obregón, S.A. de C.V
- President: René Arturo Rodríguez
- Manager: José Mosquera

The Yaquis de Obregón (English: Obregón Yaquis) are a professional baseball team based in Ciudad Obregón, Sonora, Mexico. They compete in the Mexican Pacific League (LMP). The team plays at the Estadio Yaquis with a capacity of 16,500 seated spectators.

The team has won the LMP championship seven times. The Yaquis are the only team in league history to have won three consecutive league championships, achieving this feat in the 2010–11, 2011–12, and 2012–13 seasons.

== History ==
Professional baseball in Ciudad Obregón dates back to 1947, when the first club was established, nicknamed the Arroceros (Rice Growers). In 1958, the team changed its nickname to the Rojos (Reds), and in 1964 to the Trigueros (Wheat Growers).

The Yaquis de Obregón were founded in 1970 and the team played its first game on 8 October 1970 in the Estadio Tomás Oroz Gaytán.

The team has had 7 championships. The first one was in the 1965–1966 season with Manuel Magallón as coach. The next two titles were on the 1972–1973 season under Dave Garcia and the 1980–1981 season under Lee Sigman. On 27 January 2008 the team won their fourth championship, defeating Venados de Mazatlán four games to one, with Homar Rojas as manager.

Managed by Eddie Díaz, the team won the 2010-11 championship, defeating Algodoneros de Guasave four games to three, and went on to win the 2011 Caribbean Series contested in Mayagüez, Puerto Rico. The team won a second and third consecutive title after winning the 2011–2012 and 2012–2013 championships under Díaz. Later, they went on to win the 2013 Caribbean Series. The 2013 Caribbean Series was the first to feature a final game after a round-robin tournament. The final game lasted 18 innings, ending at 2 am local time. They are the first team in the Liga Mexicana del Pacífico to win three championships in a row.

== Stadium ==
The Yaquis first played in the Álvaro Obregón Stadium from its inception until 1971, when the Estadio Tomás Oroz Gaytán was inaugurated. In 2016, the team moved to the newly inaugurated Estadio Yaquis, with capacity of 16,500 seated spectators.

== Roster ==
Yaquis de Obregón roster
Active roster		Coaches
Pitchers: 54 (Mexico) Cristian Alvarado; 75 (Mexico) Aníbal Cervantes; 49 (Mexico) Manuel Chávez; 27 (Mexico) Efraín Contreras; 45 (Cuba) Odrisamer Despaigne; 33 (United States) Nick Gardewine; 38 (Mexico) Felipe González; 56 (Mexico) Orlando Lara; 53 (Cuba) Elián Leyva; 96 (Mexico) Juan Macías; 58 (Mexico) Javier Rodríguez; 19 (Cuba) Miguel Romero; 36 (Mexico) Fernando Sánchez; 55 (Mexico) Giovanni Vargas; 14 (Mexico) Samuel Zazueta	Catchers: 15 (Mexico) Santiago Chávez; 8 (Mexico) Alfredo Hurtado; 39 (Mexico) Néstor Ríos; Infielders: 47 (Mexico) Juan Carlos Gamboa; 2 (Mexico) Antonis Macías; 6 (Mexico) Víctor Márquez; 25 (Mexico) Víctor Mendoza; 30 (Mexico) Roberto Valenzuela; 23 (Mexico) Kevin Villavicencio; Outfielders: 48 (Mexico) Braulio Cavero; 13 (Panama) Allen Córdoba; 10 (Mexico) Sebastián Elizalde; 41 (Mexico) José Gaitán; 22 (Japan) Taiki Sekine; 57 (Mexico) Guillermo Williamson	Manager: -- (Mexico) Gabe Álvarez; Coaches: -- (Mexico) Héctor Álvarez (third base); -- (Mexico) Tavo Álvarez (pitching); 40 (Mexico) Sergio Omar Gastélum (bench); -- (Mexico) Mario Mendoza Jr. (bullpen); -- (Mexico) Leo Rodríguez (first base); -- (Mexico) Carlos Sievers (hitting); Roster updated on 22 December 2025

== Championships ==
Season	Manager	Opponent	Series score	Record
1965–66	Manuel Magallón	No final series		48–32–5
1972–73	Dave Garcia	Mayos de Navojoa	4–1	54–43
1980–81	Lee Sigman	Naranjeros de Hermosillo	4–3	58–40
2007–08	Homar Rojas	Venados de Mazatlán	4–1	51–34
2010–11	Eddie Díaz	Algodoneros de Guasave	4–3	50–34
2011–12	Eddie Díaz	Algodoneros de Guasave	4–0	49–34
2012–13	Eddie Díaz	Águilas de Mexicali	4–0	48–35
Total championships			7	

== Caribbean Series record ==
Year	Venue	Finish	Wins	Losses	Win%	Manager
1973	(Venezuela) Caracas	4th	1	5	.167	(United States) Dave Garcia
2008	(Dominican Republic) Santiago	3rd	2	4	.333	(Mexico) Homar Rojas
2011	(Puerto Rico) Mayagüez	1st	4	2	.667	(Dominican Republic) Eddie Díaz
2012	(Dominican Republic) Santo Domingo	4th	2	4	.333	(Dominican Republic) Eddie Díaz
2013	(Mexico) Hermosillo	1st	4	3	.571	(Dominican Republic) Eddie Díaz
Total			13	18	.419	

== Notable players ==
- (United States) Willie Aikens
- (Mexico) Alfredo Amézaga
- (Mexico) Fabián Anguamea
- (United States) Dusty Baker
- (United States) Marlon Byrd
- (Cuba) Bárbaro Cañizares
- (Mexico) Vinny Castilla
- (United States) Justin Christian
- (United States) Doug Clark
- (United States) Chris Coste
- (Mexico) Francisco Estrada
- (Puerto Rico) Nelson Figueroa
- (Mexico) Jorge Fitch
- (Mexico) Giovanny Gallegos
- (Mexico) Karim García
- (Mexico) Gerónimo Gil
- (Mexico) Leo Heras
- (United States) Al Hrabosky
- (United States) Jacque Jones
- (United States) Randy Keisler
- (Mexico) Luis Mendoza
- (Mexico) Sid Monge
- (Mexico) Agustin Murillo
- (Mexico) Juan Navarrete
- (United States) Sean Nolin
- (Japan) Tomo Otosaka
- (Mexico) Aurelio Rodríguez
- (Mexico) Enrique Romo
- (Mexico) Vicente Romo
- (Japan) Taiki Sekine
- (Mexico) Joakim Soria
- (United States) Reggie Taylor
- (United States) Jerry Turner
- (Mexico) Luis Urías
- (Mexico) Jorge Vázquez

== Results from all seasons ==
Place	Season
1st	2012–13
1st	2011–12
1st	2010–11
4th	2009–10
6th	2008–09
1st	2007–08
3rd	2006–07
7th	2005–06
4th	2004–05
2nd	2003–04
2nd	2002–03
6th	2001–02
3rd	2000–01

Place	Season
7th	1999–00
6th	1998–99
8th	1997–98
5th	1996–97
8th	1995–96
6th	1994–95
6th	1993–94
4th	1992–93
6th	1991–92
3rd	1990–91

Place	Season
9th	1989–90
5th	1988–89
8th	1987–88
10th	1986–87
9th	1985–86
7th	1984–85
4th	1983–84
10th	1982–83
4th	1981–82
1st	1980–81

Place	Season
4th	1979–80
6th	1978–79
3rd	1977–78
6th	1976–77
2nd	1975–76
4th	1974–75
2nd	1973–74
1st	1972–73
4th	1971–72
3rd	1970–71

Place	Season
4th	1969–70
2nd	1968–69
6th	1967–68
7th	1966–67
1st	1965–66
6th	1964–65
5th	1963–64
5th	1962–63
4th	1961–62
4th	1960–61
4th	1958–59
