= Venados de Mazatlán =

Logo
Cap insignia

Information
- League: Mexican Pacific League
- Location: Mazatlan, Sinaloa
- Ballpark: Estadio Teodoro Mariscal
- Founded: 1945
- Caribbean Series championships: 2 (2005, 2016)
- League championships: 9 (1974, 1977, 1987, 1993, 1998, 2005, 2006, 2009, 2016)
- Colors: Red, black and white
- Ownership: Espectáculos Costa del Pacífico, S.A. de C.V.
- Manager: Juan José Pacho
- Website: www.venados.com/baseball/

Venados de Mazatlán (English: Mazatlán Deers) are a professional baseball team in the Mexican Pacific League based in Mazatlan, Sinaloa.

== History ==
In February 1958, Venados participated in an international tournament, dubbed the Pan-American Series, against two other club champions: Vanytor of the Colombian League and Leones of the Nicaraguan League.

=== 2004–05: Championship and Caribbean Series ===
In the 2004–2005 season, the Venados of Mazatlán won the Mexican Pacific League title for the seventh time. The Caribbean Series was held at Teodoro Mariscal Stadium in Mazatlán, and the Venados performed well out of the gate, winning twice against the Dominican Republic's Águilas Cibaeñas and Puerto Rico's Indios de Mayaguez.

The 2005 team had a star-studded lineup, including Miguel Ojeda, Elmer Dessens, Luis Ayala, Jorge Campillo, Vinny Castilla, Erubiel Durazo, Johnny Gomes, and Francisco Campos. The Venados beat Venezuela's Tigres de Aragua in their first head-to-head game, with Campos pitching a three-hit shutout.

Campos went on to pitch in the final against the Aguilas, pitching eight innings and giving up two runs and three hits for the victory in a 4-3 Venados win. The resulting Caribbean Series Championship was the first in club history.

=== 2016: Second Caribbean series title ===
In 2016, the team won the Mexican Pacific League Championship and went on to win their second Caribbean Series, which was played in Santo Domingo, Dominican Republic, under manager Juan José Pacho.

== Stadium ==
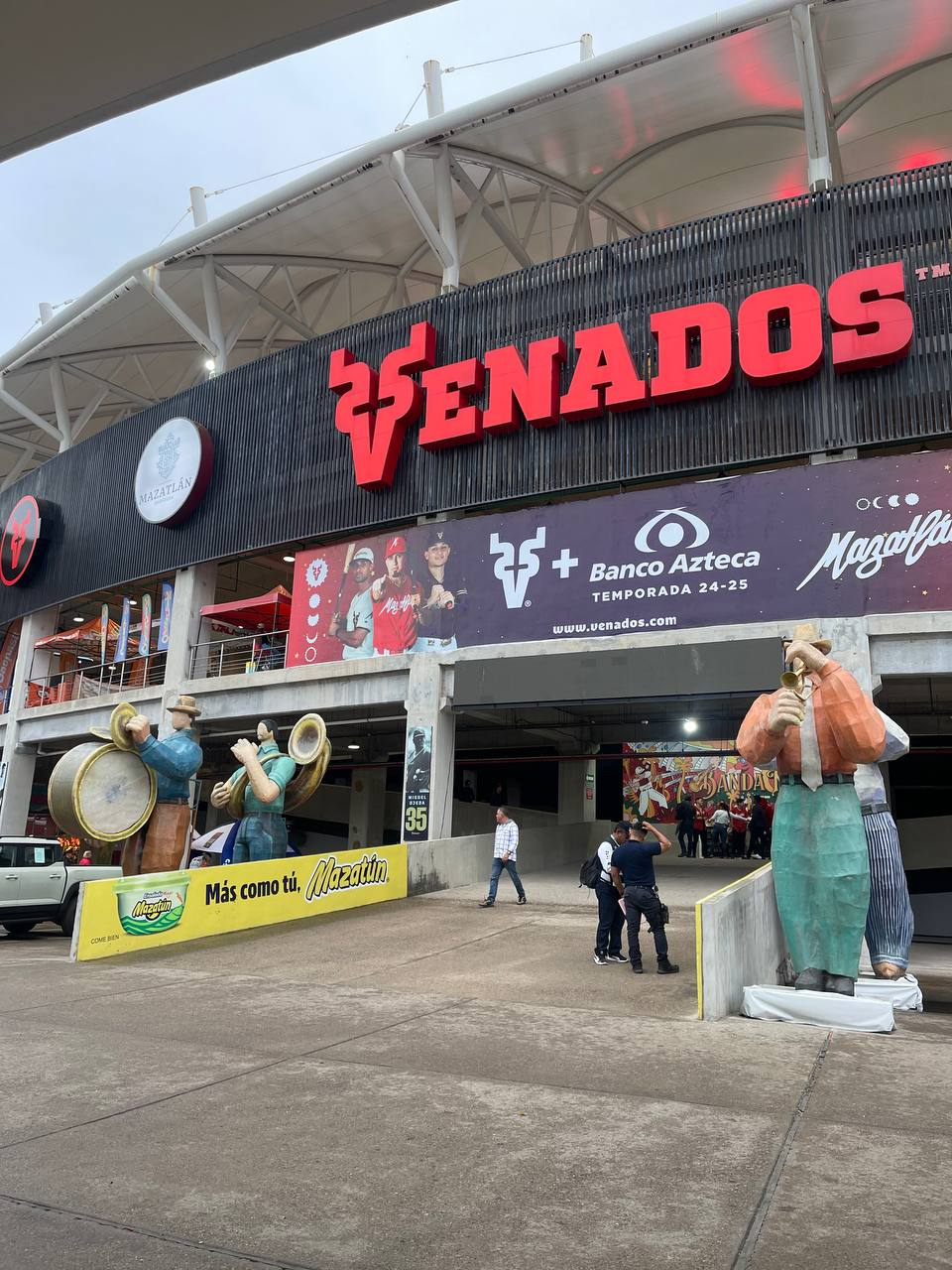
Stadium

Estadio Teodoro Mariscal was constructed in 1962 with a capacity of 14,000 and is primarily used for baseball. It is 325 feet down the stadium's right and left field lines and 400 feet to the center field wall. The stadium is located in between Avenida Insurgentes and Reforma near Bosque de la Ciudad and The Aquarium. A famous singer, El Coyote, is said to regularly attend Venados games at Estudio Marsical. In 2000 the stadium underwent a major remodeling that expanded capacity from 12,000 to 14,000.

== Roster ==
Venados de Mazatlán roster
Active roster		Coaches
Pitchers: 92 (Mexico) Octavio Acosta; 48 (Mexico) Guillermo Arvizu; 77 (Mexico) Manuel Flores; 14 (Mexico) Demetrio Gutiérrez; 12 (Mexico) Mario Jiménez; 16 (Dominican Republic) Rafael Kelly; 59 (United States) Vidal Nuño; 73 (Mexico) Adolfo Ramírez; 49 (Mexico) Edgar Rodríguez; 29 (Mexico) Erick Rodríguez; 5 (Mexico) Oscar Rojas; 45 (United States) Aaron Shortridge; 10 (United States) Braulio Torres-Pérez; 60 (Mexico) Juan Pablo Téllez; 21 (Mexico) Édgar Torres	Catchers: 44 (Mexico) Christopher Escarrega; -- (Mexico) Jorge Morales; 20 (Mexico) Miguel Ojeda Jr.; Infielders: 3 (United States) Andrés Álvarez; 53 (Dominican Republic) Edwin Espinal; 29 (Mexico) Keven Lamas; 70 (Mexico) Juan Mora; 19 (Mexico) Ramiro Peña; 66 (Mexico) Brayan Quintero; 47 (Mexico) Carlos Tirado; 30 (Dominican Republic) Estamy Ureña; Outfielders: 79 (Mexico) Leo Germán; 43 (Mexico) Miguel Guzmán; 25 (Mexico) Fabricio Macías; 51 (United States) Miles Simington	Manager: (Mexico) Juan José Pacho; Coaches: 77 (Mexico) Alfredo Amézaga (Hitting); 6 (Mexico) Gerardo Álvarez (Third Base); 31 (United States) Cory Domel (Bullpen); 3 (Mexico) Porfirio Mendoza (First Base); 63 (Mexico) Ricardo Osuna (Pitching); 32 (Mexico) Placido Pinto (Catchers); 42 (Mexico) Vicente Romo (Bullpen); Roster updated on 22 December 2025
