= Ostioneros de Guaymas =

Mexican baseball team

- Logo

Information
- League: Mexican Pacific League (1945–1953; 1958–1991)
- Location: Guaymas, Sonora
- Ballpark: Estadio Abelardo L. Rodríguez
- Founded: 1945
- Folded: 2008
- League championships: 7 (1947–48, 1950–51, 1958–59, 1959–60, 1962–63, 1964–65, 1967)
- Former name: Marineros de Guaymas (1978–1983)
- Colors: Blue, red and white

The Ostioneros de Guaymas were a professional baseball team based in Guaymas, Sonora, Mexico. The Ostioneros played in the Mexican Pacific League and used the Estadio Abelardo L. Rodríguez as their home ballpark. During its existence, the club won seven league championships.

== History ==
The Ostioneros were one of the four original founding members of the Mexican Pacific Coast League, a winter league circuit that operated in Mexico in the seasons from 1945–46 through 1957–58. The team won pennant titles in the 1947–48 and 1950–51 seasons, managed by Juan Guerrero and Luis Montes de Oca, respectively. In 1950–51, Ostioneros shared the league championship with the Tacuarineros de Culiacán.

Before the 1958–59 season, the circuit was renamed Sonora Winter League and lasted through the 1991–92 season. This is considered the beginning of the modern era of what is now the Mexican Pacific League. The Guaymas club also competed in this second stage, winning titles in 1958–59 and 1959–60 guided by Manuel Magallón, in 1962–63 and 1964–65 with Guillermo Frayde at the helm, and 1967–68 with Ronaldo Camacho, to won seven league titles in both stints.

The Ostioneros played at the Estadio Abelardo L. Rodríguez during its entire existence.

The Ostioneros name has since been used by other sport clubs based in Guaymas.

== Championships ==
Season	Manager	Opponent	Series score	Record
1947–48	Juan Guerrero	No final series		38–22–1
1950–51	Luis Montes de Oca	No final series		37–23
1958–59	Manuel Magallón	Naranjeros de Hermosillo	3–2	25–16–1
1959–60	Manuel Magallón	No final series		31–17–1
1962–63	Guillermo Frayde	Cañeros de Los Mochis	3–1	35–29–2
1964–65	Guillermo Frayde	No final series		47–33–4
1967	Ronnie Camacho	No final series		58–36–2
Total championships			7	

== Notable players ==
- (United States) Matt Alexander
- (United States) Derek Bryant
- (Mexico) Ronnie Camacho
- (Mexico) Matías Carrillo
- (Mexico) Arnoldo Castro
- (United States) Gary Gray

- (United States) Jerry Hinsley
- (United States) Felix McLaurin
- (Mexico) Sid Monge
- (Mexico) Andrés Mora
- (United States) Steve Ontiveros
- (United States) Mike Ramsey

- (Mexico) Alfredo Ríos
- (Mexico) Enrique Romo
- (Mexico) Vicente Romo
- (Mexico) Jorge Rubio
- (United States) Larry See
- (United States) Barney Serrell
