= Mexican Pacific League =

Professional baseball league in Mexico

- Upcoming season or competition: 2026–27 Mexican Pacific League season
- Sport: Baseball
- Founded: 1945
- Commissioner: Salvador Escobar Cornejo
- No. of teams: 10
- Country: Mexico
- Headquarters: Guadalajara, Jalisco
- Confederation: CPBC; WBSC Americas
- Most recent champions: Charros de Jalisco (4th title)
- Most titles: Naranjeros de Hermosillo (17 titles)
- Broadcasters: Fox; Mega Sports; TVC Deportes; YouTube TV
- Website: www.lmp.mx (in Spanish)

The Mexican Pacific League (Spanish: Liga Mexicana del Pacífico, abbreviation; LMP), officially known as the Mexican Pacific League Banamex for sponsorship reasons, is a professional baseball winter league based in Northwestern Mexico. The league comprises 10 teams. It was founded in 1945. The league's champion takes part in the Caribbean Series each year.

The sixty-eight game regular season is split in two halves. After each half, the teams are awarded points. The first place team earns ten points, while the last place team earns three and a half points. At the end of the regular season the total number of points are added up from both halves to determine playoff positioning. The top eight teams advance. There are no divisions.

== History ==
In 1945, a group of people led by Teodoro Mariscal established the Liga de la Costa del Pacífico (English: Pacific Coast League). The league's first season (1945–46) started with four teams: Tacuarineros de Culiacán, Ostioneros de Guaymas, Queliteros de Hermosillo and Venados de Mazatlán. Mariscal was appointed as the league's first president. In 1947 the league expanded with two new teams: Arroceros de Ciudad Obregón and Pericos de Los Mochis.

In 1958, only four teams participated, all from the state of Sonora: Rojos de Ciudad Obregón, Rieleros de Empalme, Naranjeros de Hermosillo and Ostioneros de Guaymas. Since all the participant teams were from Sonora, the league changed its name to Liga Invernal de Sonora (English: Sonora Winter League). In 1959, Mayos de Navojoa replaced Ciudad Obregón. In 1962, Ciudad Obregón and Los Mochis returned to the league. In 1965, Mazatlán and Tomateros de Culiacán joined the league, which changed its name for third time to Liga Invernal Sonora-Sinaloa (English: Sonora-Sinaloa Winter League).

In 1970, the league changed its name to the current Liga Mexicana del Pacífico (English: Mexican Pacific League) and joined the Confederación de Béisbol Profesional del Caribe (English: Caribbean Professional Baseball Confederation), thus participating for the first time in the 1971 Caribbean Series.

In 2020, the league signed a 5-year naming rights deal with ARCO.

Two teams joined the LMP for the 2020 season: Sultanes de Monterrey, that became the first team to play in the two professional baseball leagues in Mexico, and Algodoneros de Guasave, that returned to the Mexican Pacific League after disappearing in 2014.

== Teams ==
2026–27 Mexican Pacific League team locations

Team	City	State	Stadium	Capacity	Founded
Águilas de Mexicali	Mexicali	Baja California	Estadio Farmacias Sta. Mónica	17,000	1948
Algodoneros de Guasave	Guasave	Sinaloa	Kuroda Park	8,500	1965
Cañeros de Los Mochis	Los Mochis	Sinaloa	Chevron Park	12,500	1947
Charros de Jalisco	Zapopan	Jalisco	Estadio Panamericano	16,500	2014
Jaguares de Nayarit	Tepic	Nayarit	Estadio Coloso Don Alejo Peralta	9,480	2025
Mayos de Navojoa	Navojoa	Sonora	Estadio Manuel "Ciclón" Echeverría	11,500	1959
Naranjeros de Hermosillo	Hermosillo	Sonora	Estadio Fernando Valenzuela	16,000	1944
Tomateros de Culiacán	Culiacán	Sinaloa	Estadio Tomateros	19,210	1965
Venados de Mazatlán	Mazatlán	Sinaloa	Estadio Teodoro Mariscal	16,000	1945
Yaquis de Obregón	Ciudad Obregón	Sonora	Estadio Yaquis	16,500	1947

== Champions ==
Season	Liga de la Costa del Pacífico Champion
1945–46	Venados de Mazatlán
1946–47	Presidentes de Hermosillo
1947–48	Ostioneros de Guaymas
1948–49	Tacuarineros de Culiacán
1949–50	Tacuarineros de Culiacán
1950–51	Ostioneros de Guaymas
1951–52	Tacuarineros de Culiacán
1952–53	Venados de Mazatlán
1953–54	Venados de Mazatlán
1954–55	Venados de Mazatlán
1955–56	Tacuarineros de Culiacán
1956–57	Naranjeros de Hermosillo
1957–58	Venados de Mazatlán

Season	Liga Invernal de Sonora Champion
1958–59	Ostioneros de Guaymas
1959–60	Ostioneros de Guaymas
1960–61	Naranjeros de Hermosillo
1961–62	Naranjeros de Hermosillo
1962–63	Ostioneros de Guaymas
1963–64	Naranjeros de Hermosillo
1964–65	Ostioneros de Guaymas

season	Liga Sonora-Sinaloa Champion
1965–66	Yaquis de Obregón
1966–67	Tomateros de Culiacán
1967–68	Ostioneros de Guaymas
1968–69	Cañeros de Los Mochis
1969–70	Tomateros de Culiacán

Season	Liga Mexicana del Pacífico Champion
1970–71	Naranjeros de Hermosillo
1971–72	Algodoneros de Guasave
1972–73	Yaquis de Obregón
1973–74	Venados de Mazatlán
1974–75	Naranjeros de Hermosillo
1975–76	Naranjeros de Hermosillo
1976–77	Venados de Mazatlán
1977–78	Tomateros de Culiacán
1978–79	Mayos de Navojoa
1979–80	Naranjeros de Hermosillo
1980–81	Yaquis de Obregón
1981–82	Naranjeros de Hermosillo
1982–83	Tomateros de Culiacán
1983–84	Cañeros de Los Mochis
1984–85	Tomateros de Culiacán
1985–86	Águilas de Mexicali
1986–87	Venados de Mazatlán
1987–88	Potros de Tijuana
1988–89	Águilas de Mexicali
1989–90	Naranjeros de Hermosillo
1990–91	Potros de Tijuana
1991–92	Naranjeros de Hermosillo
1992–93	Venados de Mazatlán
1993–94	Naranjeros de Hermosillo
1994–95	Naranjeros de Hermosillo
1995–96	Tomateros de Culiacán
1996–97	Tomateros de Culiacán
1997–98	Venados de Mazatlán
1998–99	Águilas de Mexicali
1999–2000	Mayos de Navojoa
2000–01	Naranjeros de Hermosillo
2001–02	Tomateros de Culiacán
2002–03	Cañeros de Los Mochis
2003–04	Tomateros de Culiacán
2004–05	Venados de Mazatlán
2005–06	Venados de Mazatlán
2006–07	Naranjeros de Hermosillo
2007–08	Yaquis de Obregón
2008–09	Venados de Mazatlán
2009–10	Naranjeros de Hermosillo
2010–11	Yaquis de Obregón
2011–12	Yaquis de Obregón
2012–13	Yaquis de Obregón
2013–14	Naranjeros de Hermosillo
2014–15	Tomateros de Culiacán
2015–16	Venados de Mazatlán
2016–17	Águilas de Mexicali
2017–18	Tomateros de Culiacán
2018–19	Charros de Jalisco
2019–20	Tomateros de Culiacán
2020–21	Tomateros de Culiacán
2021–22	Charros de Jalisco
2022–23	Cañeros de Los Mochis
2023–24	Naranjeros de Hermosillo
2024–25	Charros de Jalisco
2025–26	Charros de Jalisco

Teams in gold Caribbean Series champions

=== Championships (1945–1958) ===
- Mazatlán (Antiguos Venados): 5 (1946, 1953, 1954, 1955, 1958)
- Culiacán (Tacuarineros): 5 (1949, 1950,1951 1952, 1956)
- Hermosillo (Queliteros/Presidentes/Naranjeros): 2 (1947, 1957)
- Guaymas (Antiguos Ostioneros): 1 (1948)

=== Championships by team ===
Rank	Team	Wins	Years
1	Naranjeros de Hermosillo	17	1961, 1962, 1964, 1971, 1975, 1976, 1980, 1982, 1990, 1992, 1994, 1995, 2001, 2007, 2010, 2014, 2024
2	Tomateros de Culiacán	13	1967, 1970, 1978, 1983, 1985, 1996, 1997, 2002, 2004, 2015, 2018, 2020, 2021
3	Venados de Mazatlán	9	1974, 1977, 1987, 1993, 1998, 2005, 2006, 2009, 2016
4	Yaquis de Obregón	7	1966, 1973, 1981, 2008, 2011, 2012, 2013
5	Águilas de Mexicali	4	1986, 1989, 1999, 2017
5	Cañeros de Los Mochis	4	1969, 1984, 2003, 2023
5	Charros de Jalisco	4	2019, 2022, 2025, 2026
8	Mayos de Navojoa	2	1979, 2000
8	Potros de Tijuana	2	1988, 1991
10	Algodoneros de Guasave	1	1972

== Records ==
=== Single season batting ===
Player	Team	Total	Season
Batting average
(Mexico) Héctor Espino	Naranjeros de Hermosillo	.415	1972–73
(Dominican Republic) Sandy Madera	Cañeros de Los Mochis	.413	2009–10
(Mexico) Eduardo Arredondo	Algodoneros de Guasave	.406	2010–11
Home runs
(Mexico) Ronnie Camacho	Rieleros de Empalme	27	1963–64
(United States) Bobby Darwin	Naranjeros de Hermosillo	27	1971–72
(Mexico) Héctor Espino	Naranjeros de Hermosillo	26	1972–73
RBIs
(Mexico) Héctor Espino	Naranjeros de Hermosillo	83	1972–73
(Mexico) Héctor Espino	Naranjeros de Hermosillo	77	1963–64
(Mexico) Héctor Espino	Naranjeros de Hermosillo	75	1971–72
Hits
(Mexico) Ramón Montoya	Rieleros de Empalme	130	1963–64
(Mexico) Benjamín Valenzuela	Yaquis de Obregón	125	1954–55
(Mexico) Héctor Espino	Naranjeros de Hermosillo	125	1972–73
Stolen bases
(United States) Mike Cole	Algodoneros de Guasave	58	1984–85
(Mexico) Francisco García	Yaquis de Obregón	49	1965–66
(United States) Lou Frazier	Mayos de Navojoa	47	1989–90

=== Single season pitching ===
Player	Team	Total	Season
ERA
(Mexico) Salvador Colorado	Potros de Tijuana	0.53	1982–83
(Mexico) Maximino León	Naranjeros de Hermosillo	0.87	1979–80
(United States) Byron McLaughlin	Ostioneros de Guaymas	1.05	1978–79
Wins
(Mexico) Miguel Sotelo	Naranjeros de Hermosillo	18	1961–62
(Mexico) Daniel Ríos	Venados de Mazatlán	17	1950–51
(Mexico) Vicente Romo	Ostioneros de Guaymas	17	1963–64
Saves
(Mexico) Jake Sanchez	Águilas de Mexicali	26	2021-22
(United States) Mark Zappelli	Yaquis de Obregón	23	1990–91
(Mexico) Andrés Ávila	Cañeros de Los Mochis	23	2015–16
Strikeouts
(Mexico) José Leyva	Ostioneros de Guaymas	203	1966–67
(Mexico) Felipe Leal	Naranjeros de Hermosillo	195	1965–66
(United States) Jerry Hinsley	Naranjeros de Hermosillo	176	1968–69

== See also ==
- Mexican League
- Mexican Professional Baseball Hall of Fame
- Mexico baseball awards
- Sport in Mexico
