= 2025 Mexican Baseball League All-Star Game =

2025 Mexican League All-Star Game
LMB All-Stars	Mexico
3	4
	1	2	3	4	5	6	7	R	H	E
LMB All-Stars	0	0	0	1	2	0	0	3	6	1
Mexico	0	0	0	0	0	2	2	4	7	1
- Date: 29–30 June 2025
- Venue: Estadio Alfredo Harp Helú
- City: Mexico City
- Attendance: 5,890

The 2025 Mexican League All-Star Game was the 91st All-Star Game of the Mexican League (LMB). Traditionally contested between the Zona Norte and Zona Sur All-Stars, the game was reformatted in celebration for the league’s 100th anniversary to feature the LMB Stars against the Mexico national baseball team. The game was hosted by the Diablos Rojos del México at Estadio Alfredo Harp Helú in Mexico City.

Originally scheduled for 29 June, the game was interrupted by heavy rain after the first half-inning and ultimately postponed. After multiple delays, at 23:59, the league rescheduled the game for the following day, 30 June, at 16:00.

Mexico, led by manager Vinicio Castilla, won the game 4–3, defeating the All-Stars, led by manager Lorenzo Bundy. As a result of the rain delay, the game was reduced to seven innings.

== Background ==
=== Host selection ===
Mexico City was announced as the host of the 2025 Mexican League All-Star Game on 25 May 2024. It marked the 33rd time the city hosted the event and the second at the Estadio Alfredo Harp Helú, which previously staged the 87th edition in 2019.

=== Roster selections ===
Position players for the LMB All-Stars were selected through fan balloting, while pitchers were chosen by manager Lorenzo Bundy, who led the Diablos Rojos del México to the 2024 championship. The Mexico national team roster was selected by manager Benji Gil, who was later replaced by Vinicio Castilla for personal reasons. Rosters were announced on 18 June.

== Rain delay ==
The game was originally scheduled for 29 June at 19:00; however, due to heavy rain, only one half-inning was played before it was suspended. During the delay, the league organized activities for fans, including a mascot show and fireworks, but persistent rain led some spectators to leave the stadium. After approximately four hours, close to midnight, the league announced that the game would resume the following day, 30 June, at 16:00.

The decision was criticized by fans, who argued that better precautions should have been taken, given that summers in Mexico City are typically rainy and that the weather forecast for the weekend of 29 June indicated an 80% chance of rain. Many spectators had traveled from outside the city, including as far as Navojoa, Sonora and Torreón, Coahuila, spending over 15,000 MXN (roughly 780–800 USD) on tickets, travel, accommodations and related expenses. The PROFECO, the Federal Consumer Attorney’s Office, announced that fans could request a full refund, including service fees, or retain their tickets for the rescheduled game.

As a result of the postponement, the rescheduled game on 30 June drew only 5,890 spectators, a significant decrease from the crowd present on 29 June before the suspension.

== Rosters ==
=== LMB All-Stars ===
Starters
Position	Player	Team
C	(Dominican Republic) Francisco Mejía	México
1B	(Dominican Republic) Aderlin Rodríguez	Tijuana
2B	(Venezuela) Alexi Amarista	Oaxaca
3B	(Dominican Republic) Kelvin Gutiérrez	Querétaro
SS	(Venezuela) César Izturis Jr.	Durango
LF	(Venezuela) Ángel Reyes	Aguascalientes
CF	(Panama) Allen Córdoba	Jalisco
RF	(Cuba) Yadir Drake	Yucatán
DH	(Dominican Republic) Robinson Canó	México

Reserves
Position	Player	Team
C	(United States) Donny Sands	Jalisco
IF	(United States) David Hensley^{[A]}	Durango
IF	(United States) Connor Hollis	Campeche
IF	(Dominican Republic) Sandber Pimentel	León
OF	(Dominican Republic) Alejandro Mejía^{[B]}	Chihuahua

Pitchers
Player	Team
(United States) Clayton Andrews	Tigres
(Japan) Tomohiro Anraku	México
(Venezuela) Liarvis Breto	Puebla
(United States) Justin Courtney	México
(United States) Tyler Danish	Tabasco
(Dominican Republic) Geronimo Franzua	Monterrey
(United States) Paul Fry	Monterrey
(Venezuela) Junior Guerra	Dos Laredos
(United States) Daniel Mengden	Dos Laredos
(Dominican Republic) Esmil Rogers	Veracruz
(United States) Caleb Smith	Chihuahua
(United States) Blake Whitney	Oaxaca

=== Mexico ===
Starters
Position	Player	Team
C	Ricardo Valenzuela	Oaxaca
1B	Víctor Mendoza	Monterrey
2B	Carlos Sepúlveda	Oaxaca
3B	Esteban Quiroz	Monterrey
SS	Juan Carlos Gamboa	Oaxaca
LF	Julián Ornelas	Oaxaca
CF	Alonso Gaitán	Durango
RF	Nick Torres^{[C]}	Unión Laguna
DH	Art Charles^{[C]}	Yucatán

Reserves
Position	Player	Team
C	Santiago Chávez	Monclova
IF	Rodolfo Amador	Monclova
IF	Jasson Atondo	Tabasco
OF	Jesús Fabela	Campeche
OF	Brandon Villarreal	Saltillo

Pitchers
Player	Team
Manuel Chávez	Durango
Efraín Contreras	México
Edwin Fierro	México
Juan Gámez^{[D]}	Monterrey
Alemao Hernández	Oaxaca
Aldo Montes	Unión Laguna
Yoanner Negrín^{[E]}	Yucatán
Gerardo Reyes	México
Wilmer Ríos	Monclova
Fernando Salas	Tabasco
Eduardo Vera	Jalisco
Daniel Zamora^{[C]}	Tijuana

==== Roster notes ====
1. David Hensley was named as the roster replacement for Didi Gregorius.
2. Alejandro Mejía was named as the roster replacement for Orlando Martínez, who had previously replaced Yadiel Hernández.
3. Born in the United States.
4. Juan Gámez was named as the roster replacement for R. J. Alaniz due to injury.
5. Born in Cuba.

== Game summary ==
=== Starting lineup ===
LMB All-Stars
Order	Player	Team	Position
1	(Panama) Allen Córdoba	Jalisco	CF
2	(Dominican Republic) Robinson Canó	México	DH
3	(Venezuela) Alexi Amarista	Oaxaca	2B
4	(Dominican Republic) Aderlin Rodríguez	Tijuana	1B
5	(Cuba) Yadir Drake	Yucatán	LF
6	(Dominican Republic) Kelvin Gutiérrez	Querétaro	3B
7	(Venezuela) Ángel Reyes	Aguascalientes	LF
8	(Dominican Republic) Francisco Mejía	México	C
9	(Venezuela) César Izturis Jr.	Durango	SS
—	(United States) Justin Courtney	México	P

Zona Sur
Order	Player	Team	Position
1	Carlos Sepúlveda	México	2B
2	Alonso Gaitán	Durango	CF
3	Julián Ornelas	México	LF
4	Víctor Mendoza	Monterrey	1B
5	Nick Torres	Unión Lagun	RF
6	Art Charles	Yucatán	DH
7	Esteban Quiroz	Monterrey	3B
8	Ricardo Valenzuela	Oaxaca	C
9	Juan Carlos Gamboa	México	SS
—	Wilmer Ríos	Monclova	P

=== Line score ===
29–30 June 2025 19:39 (CDT) Estadio Alfredo Harp Helú in Mexico City
Team	1	2	3	4	5	6	7	R	H	E
LMB All-Stars	0	0	1	2	0	0	0	3	6	1
Mexico	0	0	0	0	0	2	2	4	7	1
Starting pitchers: LMB: Justin Courtney; MEX: Wilmer Ríos; WP: Juan Gámez (1–0) LP: Tomohiro Anraku (0–1); Home runs: LMB: Robinson Canó (1); MEX: Art Charles (1); Attendance: 5,890 Time: 2:33 (4:30 delay); Boxscore
