= 2023 Baseball Champions League Americas =

International baseball club tournament

Tournament details
- Country: Mexico
- City: Mérida
- Venue: Parque Kukulcán Alamo
- Dates: 28 September – 1 October
- Teams: 4

Final positions
- Champions: (United States) Fargo-Moorhead RedHawks (1st title)
- Runners-up: (Colombia) Caimanes de Barranquilla
- Third place: (Mexico) Leones de Yucatán
- Fourth place: (Cuba) Alazanes de Granma

Tournament statistics
- Games played: 7
- Attendance: 11,821 (1,689 per game)
- Best BA: (Puerto Rico) Roy Morales (.600)
- Most HRs: (Cuba) Yadir Drake (2)
- Most SBs: 3 tied (1)
- Best ERA: 3 tied (0.00)
- Most Ks (as pitcher): (United States) Tyler Grauer (7)

Awards
- MVP: (Puerto Rico) Roy Morales

The 2023 Baseball Champions League Americas was the first edition of the Baseball Champions League Americas, an international competition for baseball clubs organized by the WBSC Americas, part of the World Baseball Softball Confederation (WBSC).

The first edition was held in the Parque Kukulcán Alamo, in Mérida, Yucatán, Mexico, from 28 September to 1 October 2023. The competition was sanctioned by WBSC and the Mexican League and featured four teams from Colombia, Cuba, Mexico and the United States.

A single round-robin format was used, with each team facing each other once. The top two teams advanced to the final game.

The Fargo-Moorhead RedHawks, representing United States, won the tournament after defeating the Caimanes de Barranquilla, from Colombia, in the championship game, 8–0. The Leones de Yucatán (Mexico) placed third and the Alazanes de Granma (Cuba) finished fourth. Fargo Moorhead RedHawks catcher Roy Morales earned the Most Valuable Player Award of the tournament.

== Venue ==
(Mexico) Mérida	2023 Baseball Champions League Americas is located in Mexico
Parque Kukulcán Alamo	2023 Baseball Champions League Americas is located in Mexico
Capacity: 14,917	2023 Baseball Champions League Americas is located in Mexico

== Participating teams ==
Team	Manager	Means of qualification
(Cuba) Alazanes de Granma	(Cuba) Leonardo Soto	Winners of the 2022 Cuban National Series
(Colombia) Caimanes de Barranquilla	(Colombia) Carlos Vidal	Winners of the 2021–22 Colombian Professional Baseball League
(United States) Fargo-Moorhead RedHawks	(United States) Chris Coste	Winners of the 2022 American Association of Professional Baseball
(Mexico) Leones de Yucatán	(Mexico) Roberto Vizcarra	Winners of the 2022 Mexican League season

=== Rosters ===
Alazanes de Granma

Alazanes de Granma roster
Players		Coaches
Pitchers: 62 (Cuba) Erly Casanova; 89 (Cuba) Yunier Castillo; 23 (Cuba) Alberto Civil; 27 (Cuba) Yanielquis Duardo; 82 (Cuba) Keniel Ferraz; 48 (Cuba) Raymond Figueredo; 71 (Cuba) Leandro Martínez; 14 (Cuba) Miguel Paradelo; 90 (Cuba) Juan Peñalver; 20 (Cuba) Wilber Rodríguez; 16 (Cuba) Kelbis Rodríguez; 74 (Cuba) Carlos Santana	Catchers: 11 (Cuba) Yosvany Alarcón; 26 (Cuba) Nelson Batista; Infielders: 52 (Cuba) Osvaldo Abreu; 10 (Cuba) Yordany Alarcón; 21 (Cuba) Guillermo Avilés; 12 (Cuba) Andrés de la Cruz; 2 (Cuba) Aníbal Medina; 4 (Cuba) Yulian Milán; 13 (Cuba) Yobanys Millán; 8 (Cuba) Yordanis Samón; Outfielders: 53 (Cuba) Pedro Almeida; 38 (Cuba) Héctor Castillo; 25 (Cuba) Yoan Moreno; 6 (Cuba) Darián Palma; 22 (Cuba) Alexquemer Sánchez; 18 (Cuba) Raico Santos	Manager: 43 (Cuba) Leonardo Soto; Coaches: 97 (Cuba) Mario Sánchez (pitching); 77 (Cuba) Ramón Rodríguez (third base); 60 (Cuba) Luis Ferrales (first base); 75 (Cuba) Luis Ernesto González (pitching); 45 (Cuba) Carlos Martí (bench); Roster

Caimanes de Barranquilla

Caimanes de Barranquilla roster
Players		Coaches
Pitchers: 28 (Colombia) Elkin Alcalá; 10 (Mexico) Fabián Cota; 41 (Venezuela) Jesús Fandiño; 62 (Colombia) Santiago Florez; 4 (Colombia) Rubén Galindo; 88 (United States) Jalen Miller; 32 (Colombia) Luis Moreno; 17 (Dominican Republic) Oddy Núñez; 7 (Colombia) Carlos Ocampo; 40 (Dominican Republic) Fernando Pérez; 25 (Dominican Republic) José Piña; 45 (Venezuela) Pedro Rodríguez; 31 (Dominican Republic) Yasel Santana	Catchers: 1 (Venezuela) Pabel Manzanero; Infielders: 38 (Colombia) Carlos Arroyo; 9 (Venezuela) Edwin García; 6 (Venezuela) Osman Marval; 5 (Colombia) Derwin Pomare; 18 (Mexico) Edgar Robles; 29 (Colombia) Brayan Saki; 21 (United States) Demetrius Sims; Outfielders: 23 (Colombia) Gustavo Campero; 3 (Colombia) Dilson Herrera; 52 (Colombia) Jesús Marriaga; 44 (Dominican Republic) Jesús Valdez	Manager: 8 (Colombia) Carlos Vidal; Coaches: -- (Colombia) Jhadiel Ancona (bench); 77 (Colombia) Jair Morelos (first base); 71 (Colombia) Carlos Ramón Pérez (coach); 12 (Colombia) Ronald Ramírez (pitching); -- (Colombia) Hamilton Sarabia (coach); Roster

Fargo-Moorhead RedHawks

Fargo-Moorhead RedHawks roster
Players		Coaches
Pitchers: 31 (United States) Garrett Alexander; 18 (United States) Colten Davis; 17 (United States) Alex DuBord; 29 (United States) Grant Gavin; 14 (United States) Ashton Goudeau; 43 (United States) Tyler Grauer; 34 (United States) Charlie Hasty; 32 (Canada) Christian Young; 16 (United States) Correlle Prime; 38 (United States) D. J. Snelten; 16 (United States) Mitchell Verburg	Catchers: 6 (United States) Chris Herrmann; 25 (Puerto Rico) Roy Morales; Infielders: 13 (Venezuela) Manny Boscan; 12 (Aruba) Dayson Croes; 2 (United States) Sam Dexter; 4 (Venezuela) Leobaldo Piña; 24 (United States) Drew Ward; 3 (United States) Justin Wylie; Outfielders: 11 (United States) Evan Alexander; 23 (United States) Max Murphy; 1 (United States) Alec Olund; 27 (Canada) Connor Panas; 22 (United States) Dillon Thomas	Manager: 10 (United States) Chris Coste; Coaches: 15 (United States) Anthony Barone (coach); 28 (United States) Robbie Lopez (coach); 9 (United States) Joe Dominiak (coach); Roster

Leones de Yucatán

Leones de Yucatán roster
Players		Coaches
Pitchers: 60 (Mexico) Miguel Aguilar; 37 (Venezuela) Henderson Álvarez; 58 (Panama) Enrique Burgos; 27 (Mexico) Faustino Carrera; 78 (Mexico) Yamil Castillo; 43 (Mexico) Jesús Chávez; 49 (Mexico) Jesús Cruz; 12 (Mexico) Francisco Haro; 10 (Mexico) Isaac Jiménez; 72 (Dominican Republic) Williams Ramírez; 20 (Mexico) Wilmer Ríos; 99 (United States) Alexandro Tovalin; 51 (Dominican Republic) César Valdez; 14 (Mexico) Samuel Zazueta	Catchers: 35 (Mexico) Jafet Ojeda; 52 (Mexico) Sebastián Valle; 73 (Mexico) Gilberto Vizcarra; Infielders: 5 (Mexico) Ángel Camacho; 46 (United States) J. C. Escarra; 12 (United States) Joshua Fuentes; 7 (United States) Marco Jaime; 32 (Mexico) Diego Madero; 25 (Dominican Republic) Jonathan Villar; Outfielders: 33 (Cuba) Yadir Drake; 11 (Puerto Rico) Anthony García; 50 (Mexico) Edson García; 9 (Mexico) Norberto Obeso; Designated hitters: 90 (Mexico) Luis Juárez	Manager: 8 (Mexico) Roberto Vizcarra; Coaches: 31 (Mexico) Octavio Álvarez (pitching); 22 (Mexico) José Ángel Chávez (third base); 92 (Mexico) Sergio Contreras (coach); 44 (Mexico) Rogelio del Campo (coach); 76 (Mexico) Salvador Garibay (coach); 91 (Mexico) Gerardo Sánchez (first base); Roster

== Round robin ==
Pos	Team	Pld	W	L	RF	RA	RD	PCT	GB	Qualification
1	(United States) Fargo-Moorhead RedHawks	3	2	1	13	10	+3	.667	—	Advance to Final game
2	(Colombia) Caimanes de Barranquilla	3	2	1	18	16	+2	.667	—	Advance to Final game
3	(Mexico) Leones de Yucatán (H)	3	1	2	13	11	+2	.333	1	
4	(Cuba) Alazanes de Granma	3	1	2	10	17	−7	.333	1	

Source: WBSC
(H) Hosts

Date	Local time	Road team	Score	Home team	Inn.	Venue	Game duration	Attendance	Boxscore
28 Sep 2023	13:00	Fargo-Moorhead RedHawks (United States)	1–3	(Cuba) Alazanes de Granma		Parque Kukulcán Alamo	2:11	400	Boxscore
28 Sep 2023	20:30	Caimanes de Barranquilla (Colombia)	5–3	(Mexico) Leones de Yucatán		Parque Kukulcán Alamo	3:04	3,915	Boxscore
29 Sep 2023	13:00	Alazanes de Granma (Cuba)	3–7	(Colombia) Caimanes de Barranquilla		Parque Kukulcán Alamo	2:37	95	Boxscore
29 Sep 2023	20:00	Leones de Yucatán (Mexico)	1–2	(United States) Fargo-Moorhead RedHawks		Parque Kukulcán Alamo	2:37	3,393	Boxscore
30 Sep 2023	13:00	Caimanes de Barranquilla (Colombia)	6–10	(United States) Fargo-Moorhead RedHawks		Parque Kukulcán Alamo	3:23	87	Boxscore
30 Sep 2023	20:00	Alazanes de Granma (Cuba)	4–9	(Mexico) Leones de Yucatán		Parque Kukulcán Alamo	2:43	2,422	Boxscore

== Final game ==
1 October 2023 18:00 (UTC–6) at Parque Kukulcán Alamo in Mérida, México
Team	1	2	3	4	5	6	7	8	9	R	H	E
(Colombia) Caimanes de Barranquilla	0	0	0	0	0	0	0	0	0	0	5	0
(United States) Fargo-Moorhead RedHawks	0	4	0	0	2	2	0	0	X	8	11	0
WP: Tyler Grauer (1–0) LP: Jalen Miller (0–1); Home runs: Away: 0 Home: 1 Attendance: 1509; Umpires: Angel Campos, Jeff Macias, Pedro Tun, Jorge Niebla, Alan Izaguirre, Alejandro Pecero; Boxscore

== Statistical leaders ==
=== Batting ===
Stat	Name	Team	Total
AVG	(Puerto Rico) Roy Morales	(United States) Fargo-Moorhead RedHawks	.600
H	(Puerto Rico) Roy Morales	(United States) Fargo-Moorhead RedHawks	9
R	3 tied with		4
HR	(Cuba) Yadir Drake	(Mexico) Leones de Yucatán	2
RBI	(Venezuela) Pabel Manzanero	(Colombia) Caimanes de Barranquilla	7
SLG	(Cuba) Yadir Drake	(Mexico) Leones de Yucatán	1.000

=== Pitching ===
Stat	Name	Team	Total
W	7 tied with		1
L	7 tied with		1
SV	(Colombia) Elkin Alcalá	(Colombia) Caimanes de Barranquilla	2
SV	(Cuba) Alberto Civil	(Cuba) Alazanes de Granma	2
IP	(Cuba) Erly Casanova	(Cuba) Alazanes de Granma	7.0
ERA	5 tied with	0.00	
SO	(United States) Tyler Grauer	(United States) Fargo-Moorhead RedHawks	7
