= Baseball Champions League Americas =

International club baseball tournament

BCL Americas
- Sport: Baseball
- Founded: 2023
- First season: 2023
- Organizing body: WBSC Americas
- Region: North America and the Caribbean
- Most recent champions: (United States) Kane County Cougars (1st title)
- Related competitions: Caribbean Series, Serie de las Américas

The Baseball Champions League Americas, or BCL Americas, is an annual international baseball tournament organized by the WBSC Americas, part of the World Baseball Softball Confederation (WBSC). It is contested by the champion teams of various leagues in Americas, similar to the Caribbean Series (which is not WBSC-sanctioned).

It is currently played as a single round-robin tournament, with the first and second-place teams playing against each other in a final championship game. The tournament began as a four-team invitational, but is expected to expand to an eight-team league format by 2028. The inaugural tournament was held in 2023 in Mérida, Mexico; it was won by the Fargo-Moorhead RedHawks of the American Association.

== History ==
The first edition of the tournament was held from was held from 28 September to 1 October 2023 in the Parque Kukulcán Alamo, in Mérida, Yucatán, Mexico, organized by WBSC Americas. The competition was sanctioned by WBSC and the Mexican League and featured four teams from Colombia, Cuba, Mexico and the United States.

The 2024 championship was cancelled. The second edition of the tournament was supposed to be held in the Estadio de Béisbol Hermanos Serdán in Puebla, Mexico, home of the Pericos de Puebla, the 2023 Mexican League Champion.

On 10 December 2024, it was announced that the tournament would resume in 2025 with the 2025 Baseball Champions League Americas being held from 8 to 13 April in the Estadio Alfredo Harp Helú in Mexico City, home of the Diablos Rojos del México. The competition featured the Diablos Rojos, winners of the 2024 Mexican League season, plus the 2024 champions of Cuba, Curaçao, Nicaragua, Puerto Rico and the United States. After debuting in 2023, Colombia did not return for the 2025 tournament, while Curaçao, Nicaragua and Puerto Rico made their debut in the Baseball Champions League Americas.

On 27 January 2026, the WBSC confirmed the return of the tournament in 2026, hosted once again in Mexico City from 24 March to 29 March at the Estadio Alfredo Harp Helú. The event will feature four teams from the Caribbean and the Americas: the Diablos Rojos del México, repeat champions of the Mexican League, plus the 2025 champions of Cuba, Nicaragua, and the United States. Curaçao and Puerto Rico will not participate. Additionally, the 2026 competition marks the expansion of the BCL beyond the Caribbean and Americas regions, as Taiwan will send a team from the Chinese Professional Baseball League (CPBL) to represent Asia. Additionally, the WBSC announced a European version of the tournament, with the 2026 Baseball Champions League Europe to take place in May and September 2026.

== Participants ==
While the Caribbean Series is generally limited to Latin American winter league teams, BCL Americas includes the champions of the top-level independent (i.e. not affiliated with Major League Baseball) summer leagues in Mexico and the United States. (Note: The Mexican League was previously part of MLB-affiliated "organized baseball", but lost this designation in 2021.)

Country	League	First edition	Latest edition
Cuba	Cuban National Series	2023	2026
Curaçao	Curaçao National Championship AA	2025	
Colombia	Colombian Professional Baseball League	2023	
Mexico	Mexican League	2023	2026
Nicaragua	Campeonato Nacional de Béisbol Superior de Nicaragua	2025	2026
Puerto Rico	Liga Béisbol Superior Doble A de Puerto Rico	2025	
Taiwan	Chinese Professional Baseball League	2026	
United States & Canada	American Association of Professional Baseball	2023	2026

Cuba and Colombia had previously participated in the Caribbean Series, but both were dropped after the 2023 edition of the tournament. A Venezuelan team was initially slated to appear in the 2026 edition, did not ultimately participate.

== Winners ==
Year	Venue	Champion	Final score	Runner-up	Winning manager
2023	(Mexico) Mérida	(United States) Fargo-Moorhead RedHawks	8–0	(Colombia) Caimanes de Barranquilla	(United States) Chris Coste
2025	Mexico City	(Mexico) Diablos Rojos del México	6–1	(Cuba) Leñadores de Las Tunas	(United States) Lorenzo Bundy
2026	Mexico City	(United States) Kane County Cougars	7–3	(Mexico) Diablos Rojos del México	(United States) George Tsamis

== See also ==
- Caribbean Series
- Serie de las Américas
- Interamerican Series
- Baseball Champions League Europe
