= 2025 Baseball Champions League Americas =

International baseball club tournament

Tournament details
- Country: Mexico
- City: Mexico City
- Venue: Estadio Alfredo Harp Helú
- Dates: 8–13 April
- Teams: 6

Final positions
- Champions: (Mexico) Diablos Rojos del México (1st title)
- Runners-up: (Cuba) Leñadores de Las Tunas
- Third place: (United States) Kane County Cougars
- Fourth place: (Curaçao) Santa María Pirates

Tournament statistics
- Games played: 11
- Attendance: 25,880 (2,353 per game)
- Best BA: (Aruba) Dayson Croes (.706)
- Most HRs: (Cuba) Rafael Viñales (4)
- Most SBs: (Nicaragua) Juan Montes (2)
- Best ERA: 4 tied (0.00)
- Most Ks (as pitcher): (Cuba) Andy Vargas (10)

Awards
- MVP: (Dominican Republic) Robinson Canó

The 2025 Baseball Champions League Americas was the second edition of the Baseball Champions League Americas, an international competition for baseball clubs organized by the WBSC Americas, part of the World Baseball Softball Confederation (WBSC). The tournament was held at Estadio Alfredo Harp Helú in Mexico City, Mexico from 8 to 13 April and featured a field of six teams (up from four in 2023), playing in a round-robin group stage followed by a knock-out stage. The tournament was won by the Diablos Rojos del México, who hosted the tournament and also went undefeated.

== Venue ==
Mexico City	2025 Baseball Champions League Americas is located in Mexico
Estadio Alfredo Harp Helú	2025 Baseball Champions League Americas is located in Mexico
Capacity: 20,062	2025 Baseball Champions League Americas is located in Mexico

== Participating teams ==
Team	Manager	Means of qualification
(Cuba) Leñadores de Las Tunas	(Cuba) Abeicy Pantoja	2024 Cuban National Series champions
(United States) Kane County Cougars	(United States) George Tsamis	2024 American Association of Professional Baseball champions
(Mexico) Diablos Rojos del México	(United States) Lorenzo Bundy	2024 Mexican League champions
(Nicaragua) Tigres de Chinandega	(Nicaragua) Sandor Guido	2024 Germán Pomares Championship champions
(Puerto Rico) Titanes de Florida	(Puerto Rico) Tony Vega	2024 LBSDA champions
(Curaçao) Santa Maria Pirates	(Curaçao) Wladimir Balentien	2024 Curaçao AA League champions

=== Rosters ===
Diablos Rojos del México

Diablos Rojos del México roster
Active roster		Coaches
Pitchers: 20 (Japan) Tomohiro Anraku; 71 (United States) Nick Bennett; 28 (Mexico) José Bravo; 73 (Puerto Rico) Alex Claudio; 53 (United States) Trevor Clifton; 13 (United States) Justin Courtney; 72 (United States) Zac Grotz; 74 (United States) Ricky Karcher; 48 (United States) Ian Krol; 43 (United States) Michael Mariot; 45 (United States) Conner Menez; 66 (United States) Stephen Nogosek; 77 (Venezuela) Ricardo Pinto; 51 (Mexico) Gerardo Reyes; 75 (United States) Dan Straily; 65 (Dominican Republic) Domingo Tapia	Catchers: 27 (Venezuela) Eduardo Antonini; 9 (Dominican Republic) Francisco Mejía; Infielders: 22 (Dominican Republic) Robinson Canó; 47 (Mexico) Juan Carlos Gamboa; 61 (Mexico) Moisés Gutiérrez; 46 (United States) José Marmolejos; 5 (Venezuela) José Rondón; 8 (Mexico) Carlos Sepúlveda; Outfielders: 56 (Dominican Republic) Aristides Aquino; 18 (Dominican Republic) Luis Liberato; 31 (Mexico) Julián Ornelas; 67 (Venezuela) José Pirela	Manager: 30 (United States) Lorenzo Bundy; Coaches: 63 (Mexico) Jesús Arredondo (third base); 40 (Mexico) Víctor Bojórquez (bench); 39 (Venezuela) Roberto Espinoza (pitching); 12 (Mexico) Natanahel Reyes; 44 (Mexico) Carlos Sievers

Kane County Cougars

Kane County Cougars roster
Players		Coaches
Pitchers: 11 (United States) Tyler Beardsley; 29 (United States) Daniel Bies; 32 (Canada) Landen Bourassa; 16 (United States) Connor Curlis; 17 (United States) Colton Davis; 25 (United States) Jake Gozzo; 15 (United States) Jordan Martinson; 10 (United States) Chris Mazza; 18 (United States) Westin Muir; 30 (United States) Logan Nissen; 26 (United States) Jake Stevenson; 47 (United States) Vin Timpanelli	Catchers: 6 (United States) Nick Dalesandro; 34 (United States) Hayden Dunhurst; Infielders: 7 (United States) Josh Allen; 3 (United States) Brantley Bell; 1 (United States) Galli Cribbs Jr.; 12 (Aruba) Dayson Croes; 2 (United States) Shed Long Jr.; 9 (United States) Todd Lott; Outfielders: 5 (United States) Ross Adolph; 13 (United States) Max Murphy; 21 (United States) Dillon Thomas; 8 (United States) Armond Upshaw	Manager: 22 (United States) George Tsamis; Coaches: 45 (United States) Matt Passerelle (third base); 33 (United States) David Holmberg (pitching); 28 (United States) Robbie Lopez (coach)

Leñadores de Las Tunas

Leñadores de Las Tunas roster
Players		Coaches
Pitchers: 23 (Cuba) Alberto Civil; 90 (Cuba) Rodolfo Díaz; 82 (Cuba) Keniel Ferraz; 19 (Cuba) Dariel Góngora; 20 (Cuba) Yadian Martínez; 42 (Cuba) Yankiel Mauris; 91 (Cuba) Frank Medina; 59 (Cuba) Ruben Rodríguez; 62 (Cuba) Albert Valladares; 79 (Cuba) Andy Vargas	Catchers: 11 (Cuba) Yosvany Alarcón; 17 (Cuba) Andrys Pérez; 34 (Cuba) Rafael Viñales; Infielders: 10 (Cuba) Yordany Alarcón; 9 (Cuba) Jean Baldoquín; 13 (Cuba) Roberto Baldoquín; 1 (Cuba) Luis Mateo; 28 (Cuba) Denis Peña; 18 (Cuba) Tailon Sánchez; Outfielders: 38 (Cuba) Héctor Castillo; 77 (Cuba) Yoelkis Guibert; 56 (Cuba) Yuniesky Larduet; 31 (Cuba) Roel Santos	Manager: 12 (Cuba) Abeicy Pantoja; Coaches: 41 (Cuba) Javier Campbell (first base); 15 (Cuba) Ángel Sosa (bench); 25 (Cuba) Rodolfo Correa (pitching); 18 (Cuba) Félix Núñez (pitching); 4 (Cuba) Jorge Hierrezuelo (third base)

Santa María Pirates

Santa María Pirates roster
Players		Coaches
Pitchers: 30 (Curaçao) Zairich Daal; 23 (Dominican Republic) Édgar García; 26 (Netherlands) Misja Harcksen; 17 (Netherlands) Sedley Karel; 28 (Curaçao) Cedeon Langguth; 1 (Curaçao) Témesh Lourens; 19 (Curaçao) Jordan Lucas; 29 (Curaçao) Djenior Mogen; 11 (Netherlands) Jasper Popken; 18 (Netherlands) Scott Prins; 20 (Venezuela) Álvaro Seijas; 25 (Curaçao) Carrol Servania	Catchers: 14 (Curaçao) Dabertson Balentien; 10 (Curaçao) Ulrich Snijders; Infielders: 22 (Curaçao) Kevin Moesquit; 6 (Curaçao) Jonathan Schoop; 2 (Curaçao) Andrelton Simmons; Outfielders: 7 (Curaçao) Reyhan Fecunda; 5 (Curaçao) Kevin Gibson; 3 (Aruba) Jiandido Tromp; Designated hitters & Utility players: 9 (Curaçao) Jonathan Martijn (DH/OF); 12 (Curaçao) Johannes Gregorius Jr. (UTL); 27 (Curaçao) Swindley Lint (UTL); 13 (Curaçao) Juremi Profar (UTL)	Manager: 4 (Curaçao) Wladimir Balentien; Coaches: 21 (Curaçao) Jordan Quan (bench); 25 (Curaçao) Jeandre do Tanque (first base); 6 (Curaçao) Evenon Martis (pitching); 14 (Curaçao) Ericson Irausquin; 8 (Curaçao) Ghionelo Jansen (third base)

Tigres de Chinandega

Tigres de Chinandega roster
Players		Coaches
Pitchers: 72 (Nicaragua) Leonardo Crawford; 77 (Nicaragua) Jesús Garrido; 44 (Nicaragua) Yeris González; 41 (Nicaragua) Osman Gutiérrez; 96 (Nicaragua) Santos Jarquín; 55 (Nicaragua) Walter López; 36 (Nicaragua) Ronald Medrano; 32 (Nicaragua) Dilmer Mejía; 31 (Nicaragua) Ángel Obando; 66 (Nicaragua) J. C. Ramírez; 30 (Nicaragua) Luis Somarriba; 78 (Nicaragua) Bryan Torres; 88 (Nicaragua) Axel Zapata	Catchers: 24 (Nicaragua) Rodolfo Bone; 20 (Nicaragua) Marlon Díaz; 23 (Nicaragua) Ronald Rivera; Infielders: 1 (Nicaragua) Benjamin Alegría; 5 (Nicaragua) Brandon Leytón; 34 (Nicaragua) Jesús López; 4 (Nicaragua) Odlanyer Matamoros; 11 (Nicaragua) Bryan Munguía; 6 (Nicaragua) Saul Orozco; 18 (Nicaragua) Emanuel Trujillo; Outfielders: 45 (Nicaragua) Omar Mendoza; 22 (Nicaragua) Isaac Mondragón; 99 (Nicaragua) Juan Montes; Designated hitters: 28 (Nicaragua) Elián Miranda	Manager: 7 (Nicaragua) Sandor Guido; Coaches: 2 (Nicaragua) Adolfo Matamoros (first base); 8 (Venezuela) Nery Colmenares (third base); 27 (Nicaragua) Próspero González (bench); 46 (Nicaragua) Oswaldo Mairena (pitching)

Titanes de Florida

Titanes de Florida roster
Players		Coaches
Pitchers: 39 (Puerto Rico) Juan Caballero; 34 (Puerto Rico) Amaury Caban; 16 (Puerto Rico) Jean Pérez; 5 (Puerto Rico) Wilfredo Rabassa Jr.; 36 (Puerto Rico) Keven Ramos; 50 (Dominican Republic) Eddy Reynoso; 99 (Puerto Rico) Ángel Rojas; 52 (Puerto Rico) Mad Salgado; 19 (Puerto Rico) Joshua Santiago	Catchers: 17 (Puerto Rico) Kerby Camacho; 8 (Puerto Rico) Ángel Guzman; Infielders: 15 (Puerto Rico) Luis Agosto; 51 (Puerto Rico) Gabriel Ayala; 11 (Puerto Rico) Jacob Cordero; 14 (Puerto Rico) Jay Feliciano; 6 (Puerto Rico) Ángel Maldonado; 77 (Puerto Rico) Juan Martpinez; 18 (Puerto Rico) Emmanuel Rios; 10 (Puerto Rico) Miguel Vega; Outfielders: 1 (Puerto Rico) Víctor Cepero; 25 (United States) Ian Laureano; 35 (United States) Joseph Monge; 9 (Puerto Rico) Alexomar Rodriguez; Designated hitters: 44 (Puerto Rico) Abdier Rivera	Manager: 47 (Puerto Rico) Tony Vega; Coaches: 7 (Cuba) Manuel Vega (coach); 13 (Puerto Rico) Héctor Soto (coach); 22 (Puerto Rico) Inegdany Pabon (coach); 3 (Puerto Rico) Oscar Rosa (coach); 23 (Puerto Rico) Luis Maldonado (coach)

== Tournament ==
=== Group stage ===
==== Group A ====
Pos	Team	Pld	W	L	RF	RA	RD	PCT	GB	Qualification
1	(Mexico) Diablos Rojos del México (H)	2	2	0	21	6	+15	1.000	—	Advance to Semifinals
2	(Nicaragua) Tigres de Chinandega	2	1	1	18	15	+3	.500	1	Advance to Quarterfinals
3	(Puerto Rico) Titanes de Florida	2	0	2	11	29	−18	.000	2	Advance to Quarterfinals

Source: WBSC
(H) Hosts

Date	Local time	Road team	Score	Home team	Inn.	Venue	Game duration	Attendance	Boxscore
8 Apr 2025	19:30	Titanes de Florida (Puerto Rico)	2–15	(Mexico) Diablos Rojos del México		Estadio Alfredo Harp Helú	2:48	7,332	Boxscore
9 Apr 2025	19:30	Tigres de Chinandega (Nicaragua)	14–9	(Puerto Rico) Titanes de Florida		Estadio Alfredo Harp Helú	3:09	421	Boxscore
10 Apr 2025	19:30	Diablos Rojos del México (Mexico)	6–4	(Nicaragua) Tigres de Chinandega		Estadio Alfredo Harp Helú	3:08	8,805	Boxscore

==== Group B ====
Pos	Team	Pld	W	L	RF	RA	RD	PCT	GB	Qualification
1	(United States) Kane County Cougars	2	2	0	35	29	+6	1.000	—	Advance to Semifinals
2	(Cuba) Leñadores de Las Tunas	2	1	1	46	26	+20	.500	1	Advance to Quarterfinals
3	(Curaçao) Santa Maria Pirates	2	0	2	21	47	−26	.000	2	Advance to Quarterfinals

Source: WBSC

Date	Local time	Road team	Score	Home team	Inn.	Venue	Game duration	Attendance	Boxscore
8 Apr 2025	14:00	Kane County Cougars (United States)	16–14	(Curaçao) Santa Maria Pirates		Estadio Alfredo Harp Helú	3:13	417	Boxscore
9 Apr 2025	14:00	Santa Maria Pirates (Curaçao)	7–31	(Cuba) Leñadores de Las Tunas		Estadio Alfredo Harp Helú	3:09	432	Boxscore
10 Apr 2025	14:00	Leñadores de Las Tunas (Cuba)	15–19	(United States) Kane County Cougars		Estadio Alfredo Harp Helú	3:34	386	Boxscore

=== Elimination stage ===
Quarterfinals; April 11
2A	(Nicaragua) Tigres de Chinandega	11
3B	(Curaçao) Santa Maria Pirates	19
2B	(Cuba) Leñadores de Las Tunas	11
3A	(Puerto Rico) Titanes de Florida	6

Semifinals; April 12
1A	(Mexico) Diablos Rojos del México	17
3B	(Curaçao) Santa Maria Pirates	8
1B	(United States) Kane County Cougars	10
2B	(Cuba) Leñadores de Las Tunas	17

Final; April 13
1A	(Mexico) Diablos Rojos del México	6
2B	(Cuba) Leñadores de Las Tunas	1

Date	Local time	Road team	Score	Home team	Inn.	Venue	Game duration	Attendance	Boxscore
11 Apr 2025	14:00	Santa Maria Pirates (Curaçao)	19–11	(Nicaragua) Tigres de Chinandega		Estadio Alfredo Harp Helú	3:52	291	Boxscore
11 Apr 2025	19:30	Titanes de Florida (Puerto Rico)	6–11	(Cuba) Leñadores de Las Tunas		Estadio Alfredo Harp Helú	2:53	422	Boxscore
12 Apr 2025	14:00	Leñadores de Las Tunas (Cuba)	17–10	(United States) Kane County Cougars		Estadio Alfredo Harp Helú	3:00	435	Boxscore
12 Apr 2025	19:30	Santa Maria Pirates (Curaçao)	8–17	(Mexico) Diablos Rojos del México		Estadio Alfredo Harp Helú	3:11	3,326	Boxscore
13 Apr 2025	14:00	Leñadores de Las Tunas (Cuba)	1–6	(Mexico) Diablos Rojos del México		Estadio Alfredo Harp Helú	2:41	3,613	Boxscore

== Statistical leaders ==
=== Batting ===
Stat	Name	Team	Total
AVG	(Aruba) Dayson Croes	(United States) Kane County Cougars	.706
HR	(Cuba) Rafael Viñales	(Cuba) Leñadores de Las Tunas	4
RBI	(Cuba) Yosvany Alarcón	(Cuba) Leñadores de Las Tunas	13
RBI	(Curaçao) Juremi Profar	(Curaçao) Santa María Pirates	13
H	(Dominican Republic) Robinson Canó	(Mexico) Diablos Rojos del México	12
H	(Cuba) Yosvany Alarcón	(Cuba) Leñadores de Las Tunas	12
R	(Dominican Republic) Luis Liberato	(Mexico) Diablos Rojos del México	11
SB	(Nicaragua) Juan Montes	(Nicaragua) Tigres de Chinandega	2

=== Pitching ===
Stat	Name	Team	Total
W	5 tied with		1
L	5 tied with		1
SV	(Japan) Tomohiro Anraku	(Mexico) Diablos Rojos del México	1
SO	(Cuba) Andy Vargas	(Cuba) Leñadores de Las Tunas	10
IP	(Cuba) Andy Vargas	(Cuba) Leñadores de Las Tunas	9.1
ERA	4 tied with	0.00	
