= D. J. Snelten =

American baseball player (born 1992)

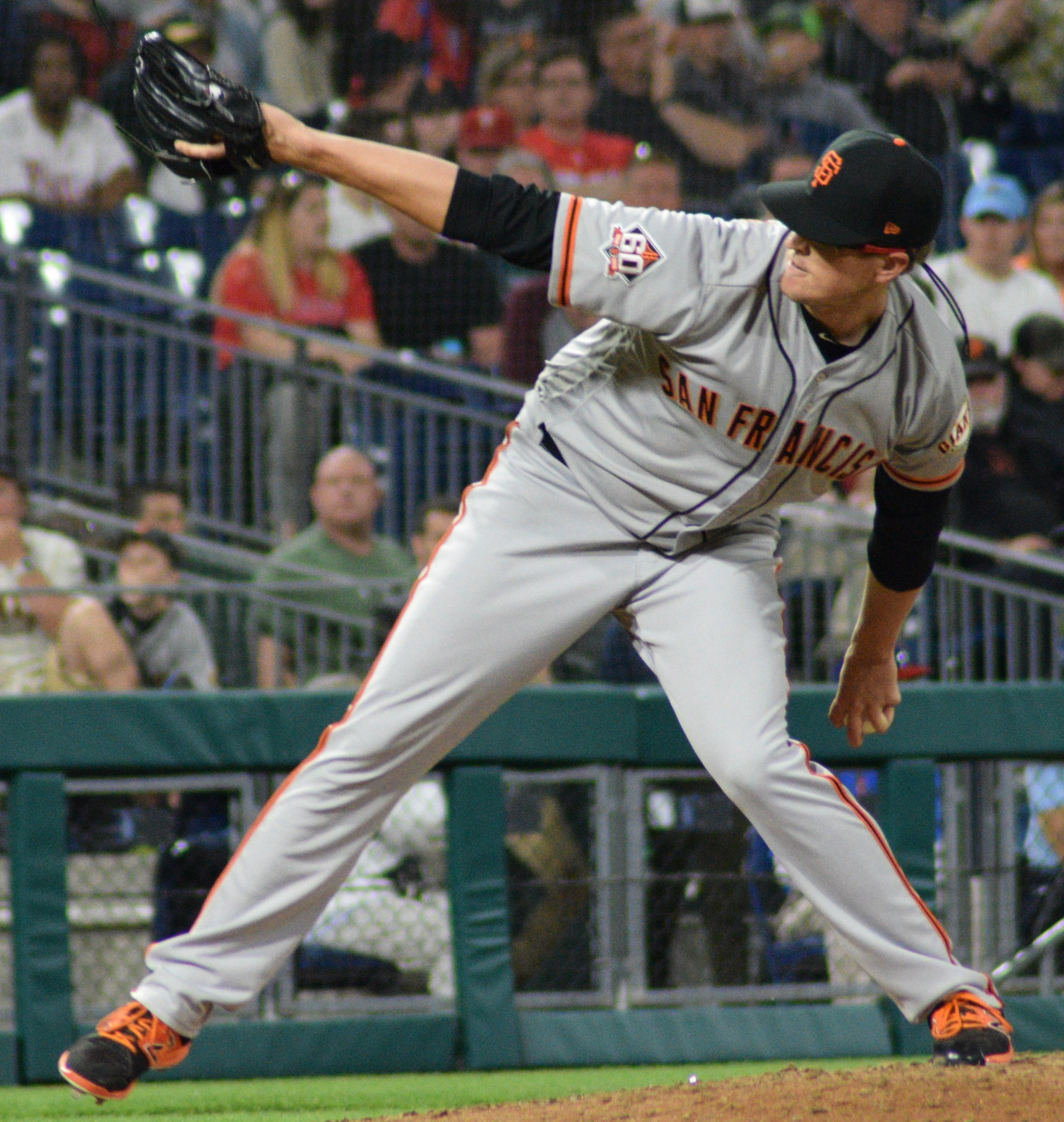
- Snelten with the San Francisco Giants in 2018

Free agent
- Pitcher
- Born: May 29, 1992 (age 34); Ingleside, Illinois, U.S.
- Bats: Left Throws: Left

MLB debut
- April 28, 2018, for the San Francisco Giants

MLB statistics (through 2018 season)
- Win–loss record: 0–0
- Earned run average: 10.38
- Strikeouts: 4
- Stats at Baseball Reference

Teams
- San Francisco Giants (2018)

Donald Marek Snelten (born May 29, 1992) is an American professional baseball pitcher who is a free agent. He has previously played in Major League Baseball (MLB) for the San Francisco Giants.

== Career ==
=== Amateur ===
Snelten attended Lakes Community High School in Lake Villa, Illinois. He was drafted by the San Diego Padres in the 30th round of the 2010 Major League Baseball draft, but did not sign and played college baseball at the University of Minnesota. In 2011, he briefly played collegiate summer baseball with the Cotuit Kettleers of the Cape Cod Baseball League.

=== San Francisco Giants ===
Snelten was drafted by the San Francisco Giants in the ninth round (282nd overall) of the 2013 Major League Baseball draft. Snelten signed and spent 2013 with the rookie-level Arizona League Giants, going 3–1 with a 1.57 ERA in 34 1/3 innings.

Snelten spent 2014 with the Salem-Keizer Volcanoes and Augusta Greenjackets, posting a combined 4–1 record and 2.56 ERA in 29 relief appearances, and 2015 with the San Jose Giants and Augusta, pitching to a combined 5–11 record and 3.44 ERA in 23 total starts between the two teams. In 2016, he pitched for San Jose, going 4–7 with a 4.11 ERA in 31 games (13 starts), and in 2017, he played for the Richmond Flying Squirrels and Sacramento River Cats where he went 8–1 with a 2.20 ERA and 1.09 WHIP in 51 appearances out of the bullpen. After the season, he played in the Arizona Fall League.

On November 20, 2017, the Giants added Snelten to their 40-man roster to protect him from the Rule 5 draft. Snelten began 2018 with Sacramento. On April 28, 2018, the Giants called up Snelten ahead of a doubleheader, and he made his major league debut in the second game. He was optioned back to Sacramento on May 8 and designated for assignment following the promotion of Dereck Rodríguez on May 28.

=== Baltimore Orioles ===
On June 4, 2018, Snelten was claimed off waivers by the Baltimore Orioles. On June 15, he was designated for assignment by Baltimore following the promotion of Corban Joseph. The next day, he cleared waivers and was sent outright to the Triple–A Norfolk Tides. In 22 games for Norfolk, Snelten recorded a 5.52 ERA with 30 strikeouts across 29 1/3 innings pitched. On March 25, 2019, Snelten was released by the Orioles organization.

=== Chicago Dogs ===
On April 15, 2019, Snelten signed with the Chicago Dogs of the independent American Association. Snelten made 20 starts for the Dogs, compiling a 7-3 record and 3.12 ERA with 112 strikeouts across 118 1/3 innings pitched.

=== Tampa Bay Rays ===
On December 29, 2019, Snelten signed with the Tampa Bay Rays, getting exposure after throwing 99 mph in viral videos seen on Rob Friedman's FlatGround Twitter account. Snelten did not play in a game in 2020 due to the cancellation of the minor league season because of the COVID-19 pandemic. He became a free agent on November 2, 2020.

=== Chicago Cubs ===
On November 19, 2020, Snelten signed a minor league contract with the Chicago Cubs. However, he did not appear in a game for the organization during the 2021 or 2022 seasons.

=== New York Yankees ===
On August 5, 2022, Snelten signed a minor league deal with the New York Yankees. He did not appear in a game for the Yankees organization in 2022.

In 2023, Snelten played in 30 games for the Triple–A Scranton/Wilkes-Barre RailRiders, struggling to a 7.50 ERA with 48 strikeouts and 2 saves in 36.0 innings of work. On July 24, 2023, Snelten was released by New York.

=== Chicago Dogs (second stint) ===
On July 31, 2023, Snelten signed with the Chicago Dogs of the American Association of Professional Baseball. In 14 games for the Dogs, Snelten pitched to a 3.33 ERA with 40 strikeouts in 24 1/3 innings of work. In September 2023, Snelten was loaned to the AAPB's Fargo-Moorhead RedHawks to participate in the 2023 Baseball Champions League Americas, which the RedHawks won.

=== Sultanes de Monterrey ===
On December 12, 2023, Snelten signed a minor league contract with the Los Angeles Angels. However, on April 10, 2024, Snelten signed with the Sultanes de Monterrey of the Mexican League. In 15 games for Monterrey, he recorded a 5.23 ERA with 15 strikeouts across 10 1/3 innings pitched. Snelten was released by the Sultanes on June 3.

=== Guerreros de Oaxaca ===
On June 15, 2024, Snelten signed with the Guerreros de Oaxaca of the Mexican League. In 10 relief appearances, he posted a 3.24 ERA and 12 strikeouts over 8 1/3 innings. Snelten was released by Oaxaca on July 5.

=== Chicago White Sox ===
On January 16, 2025, Snelten signed a minor league contract with the Chicago White Sox. He did not make an appearance for the organization before he was released on May 16.

=== San Diego Padres ===
On December 23, 2025, Snelten signed a minor league contract with the San Diego Padres. Snelten was released by San Diego prior to the start of the regular season on March 24, 2026.
