= Dillon Thomas =

American baseball player (born 1992)

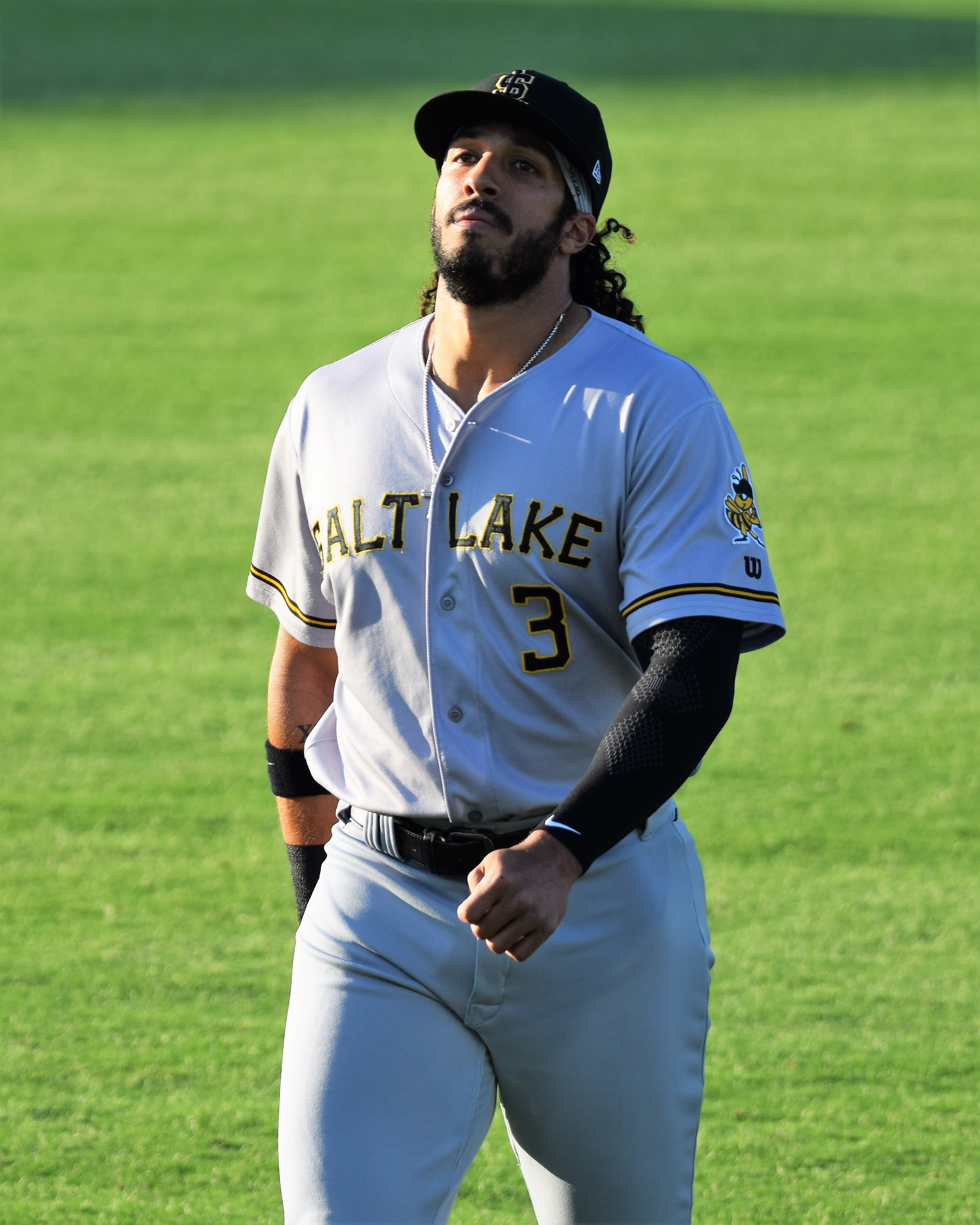
- Thomas with the Salt Lake Bees in 2022

Fargo-Moorhead RedHawks – No. 22
- Outfielder
- Born: December 10, 1992 (age 33); Houston, Texas, U.S.
- Bats: Left Throws: Left

MLB debut
- June 9, 2021, for the Seattle Mariners

MLB statistics (through 2022 season)
- Batting average: .100
- Home runs: 0
- Runs batted in: 2
- Stats at Baseball Reference

Teams
- Seattle Mariners (2021); Los Angeles Angels (2022)

Dillon Everett Thomas (born December 10, 1992) is an American professional baseball outfielder for the Fargo-Moorhead RedHawks of the American Association of Professional Baseball. He has previously played in Major League Baseball (MLB) for the Seattle Mariners and Los Angeles Angels.

== Career ==
Thomas graduated from Westbury Christian School in 2011.

=== Colorado Rockies ===
The Colorado Rockies selected Thomas in the 4th round, 138th overall, of the 2011 MLB draft. Thomas made his professional debut with the rookie ball Casper Ghosts in 2011, appearing in 15 games while batting .328 with 1 home run and 7 RBI. The next year he played for the Low-A Tri-City Dust Devils, slashing .214/.347/.250 with 4 RBI. In 2013, he played for the Single-A Asheville Tourists, posting a .255/.309/.342 slash line with 3 home runs and 36 RBI. He split the 2014 season between Tri-City and Asheville, accumulating a .280/.319/.409 with 3 home runs and 19 RBI. He played in 113 games for the High-A Modesto Nuts in 2015, slashing .248/.294/.381 with career-highs in home runs (6) and RBI (49). In 2016, Thomas played for the Double-A Hartford Yard Goats, logging a .289/.353/.425 with 4 home runs and 46 RBI in 111 games. He split the 2017 season between the Triple-A Albuquerque Isotopes, the High-A Lancaster JetHawks, and Hartford, batting .229/.296/.347 with a career-high 7 home runs and 41 RBI. He elected free agency following the season on November 6, 2017.

=== Texas AirHogs ===
On April 25, 2018, Thomas signed with the Texas AirHogs of the American Association of Independent Professional Baseball. He was named the American Association Player of the Month in July after hitting .377 with five home runs and 19 RBI. After the season, Thomas was named an AA All-Star after hitting .333/.420/.601 with 13 home runs and 54 RBI in 80 games for the team.

=== Milwaukee Brewers ===
On August 21, 2018, Thomas' contract was purchased by the Milwaukee Brewers organization. He was assigned to the High-A Carolina Mudcats, where he batted .293/.464/.341 with 5 RBI in 13 games. In 2019, Thomas played for the Double-A Biloxi Shuckers, posting a .265/.339/.434 slash line with career-highs in home runs (13) and RBI (71). He was named a Southern League All-Star for the season. On November 4, 2019, Thomas elected free agency.

=== Oakland Athletics ===
On December 3, 2019, Thomas signed a minor league contract with the Oakland Athletics organization that included an invitation to Spring Training. Thomas did not play in a game in 2020 due to the cancellation of the minor league season because of the COVID-19 pandemic. He elected free agency on November 2, 2020.

=== Seattle Mariners ===
On January 14, 2021, Thomas signed a minor league contract with the Seattle Mariners organization that included an invitation to spring training. He was assigned to the Triple-A Tacoma Rainiers to begin the year, and batted .338/.459/.625 with 6 home runs and 19 RBI in 25 games.

On June 8, Thomas was selected to the 40-man roster and promoted to the major leagues for the first time. He made his MLB debut the next day as the starting right fielder against the Detroit Tigers. In the game, Thomas notched his first career hit, a two-RBI single off of reliever Daniel Norris that helped fuel the Mariners to a 9–6 victory in extra innings. On August 2, Thomas was designated for assignment by the Mariners. On August 5, Thomas cleared waivers and was sent back to Triple–A Tacoma.

=== Los Angeles Angels ===
On December 14, 2021, Thomas signed a minor league contract with the Los Angeles Angels organization. He was selected to the roster on June 9, and appeared in one game for the Angels that day, against the Boston Red Sox, going 0-for-2 with a walk and a hit by pitch. He was designated for assignment on June 11.

=== Houston Astros ===
On June 15, 2022, the Houston Astros claimed Thomas off waivers. Thomas played in five games for the Triple–A Sugar Land Space Cowboys, going 4–for–15 with one home run, one RBI, and one walk. He was designated for assignment by Houston on June 24.

=== Los Angeles Angels (second stint) ===
On June 28, 2022, Thomas returned to the Los Angeles Angels after being claimed back off waivers. On August 7, Thomas was designated for assignment by the Angels. He was sent outright to the Triple-A Salt Lake Bees on August 9, where he spent the remainder of the year, posting a .271/.379/.464 batting line with 17 home runs, 77 RBI, and 6 stolen bases in 108 games. On October 14, Thomas elected to become a free agent.

=== Fargo-Moorhead RedHawks ===
On April 28, 2023, Thomas signed with the Fargo-Moorhead RedHawks of the American Association of Professional Baseball. In 33 games for the RedHawks, Thomas hit .344/.432/.555 with 5 home runs and 21 RBI.

=== Guerreros de Oaxaca ===
On June 25, 2023, Thomas' contract was purchased by the Guerreros de Oaxaca of the Mexican League. In 32 games for Oaxaca, he hit .310/.408/.492 with 3 home runs and 13 RBI.

=== Fargo-Moorhead RedHawks (second stint) ===
On August 11, 2023, Thomas was loaned back to the Fargo-Moorhead RedHawks of the American Association of Professional Baseball. In 56 total games for the RedHawks, Thomas posted a final batting line of .344/.434/.566 with 8 home runs, 35 RBI, and 9 stolen bases.

=== Guerreros de Oaxaca (second stint) ===
On October 4, 2023, following the American Association season, Thomas was returned to the Guerreros de Oaxaca of the Mexican League. He made two appearances for the club in 2024, going 1–for–7 (.143) with no home runs or RBI. Thomas was released by Oaxaca on April 21, 2024.

=== Fargo-Moorhead RedHawks (third stint) ===
On May 1, 2024, Thomas signed with the Fargo-Moorhead RedHawks of the American Association of Professional Baseball, marking his third stint with the team. In 37 games for Fargo, he batted .288/.358/.447 with five home runs, 28 RBI, and seven stolen bases.

On March 24, 2025, Thomas re-signed with the RedHawks for a second consecutive season. While with the RedHawks, Thomas was loaned to the AAPB's Kane County Cougars to participate in the 2025 Baseball Champions League Americas. In 94 games he hit .312/.430/.513 with 15 home runs, 50 RBIs and 15 stolen bases.

On March 23, 2026, Thomas re-signed with the RedHawks for his third consecutive season with the club. Thomas was also loaned a second, consecutive time to the Kane County Cougars to compete at the 2026 Baseball Champions League Americas.

== International career ==
Dillon Thomas participated in the 2023 Baseball Champions League Americas, going 7–13 with 4 RBIs across 3 games.
