= Luis Liberato =

Dominican baseball player (born 1995)

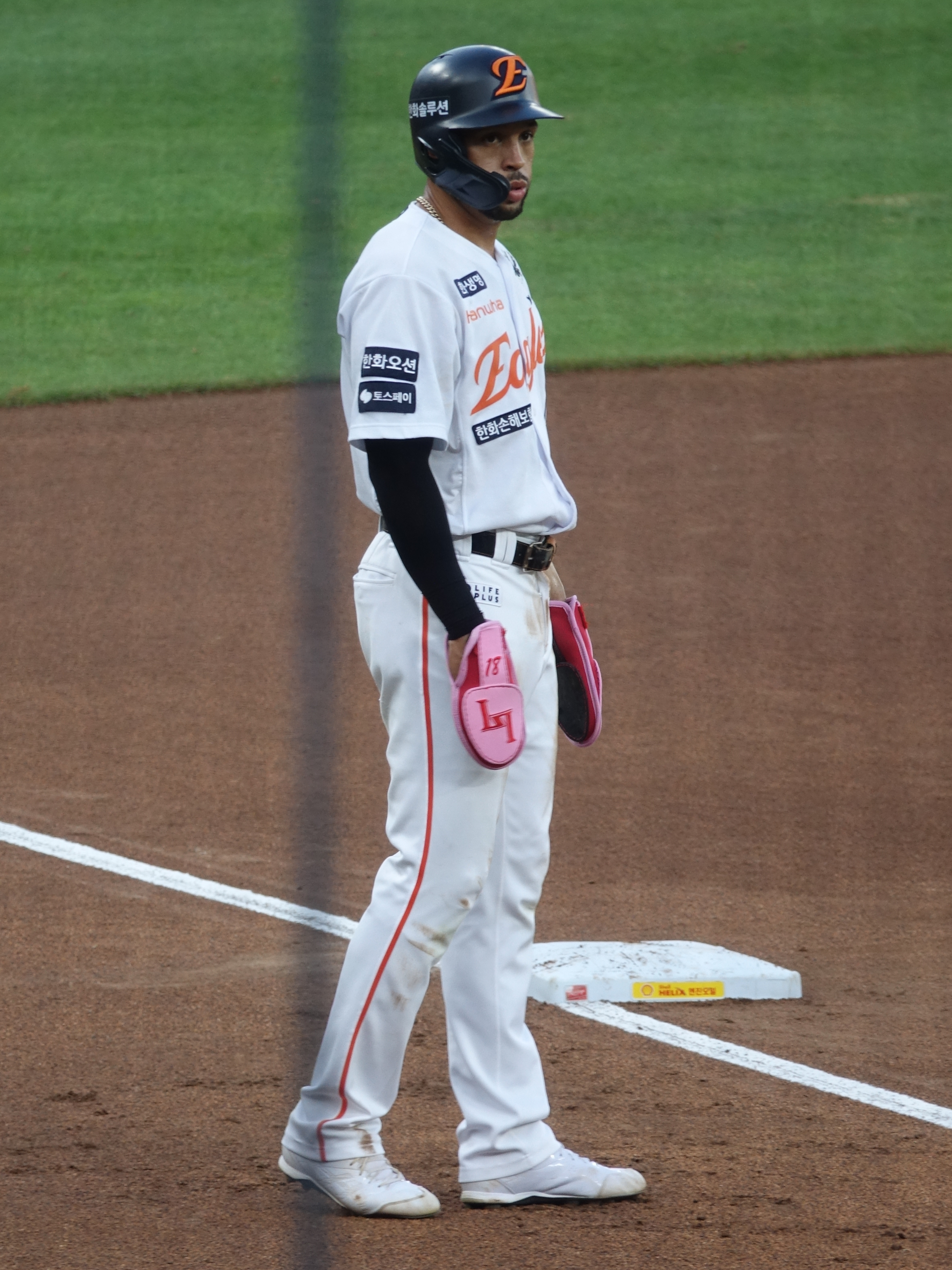
- Liberato with the Hanwha Eagles in 2025

Diablos Rojos del México – No. 0
- Outfielder
- Born: December 18, 1995 (age 30); La Canela, Dominican Republic
- Bats: Left Throws: Left

Professional debut
- MLB: September 10, 2022, for the San Diego Padres
- KBO: June 22, 2025, for the Hanwha Eagles
- CPBL: March 29, 2026, for the Fubon Guardians

MLB statistics (through 2022 season)
- Batting average: .000
- Home runs: 0
- Runs batted in: 0

KBO statistics (through 2025 season)
- Batting average: .313
- Home runs: 10
- Runs batted in: 39

CPBL statistics (through 2026 season)
- Batting average: .229
- Home runs: 0
- Runs batted in: 5
- Stats at Baseball Reference

Teams
- San Diego Padres (2022); Hanwha Eagles (2025); Fubon Guardians (2026)

Luis David Liberato (born December 18, 1995) is a Dominican professional baseball outfielder for the Diablos Rojos del México of the Mexican League. He has previously played in Major League Baseball (MLB) for the San Diego Padres, in the KBO League for the Hanwha Eagles, and in the Chinese Professional Baseball League (CPBL) for the Fubon Guardians.

== Career ==
=== Seattle Mariners ===
On December 6, 2012, Liberato signed with the Seattle Mariners organization as an international free agent. He made his professional debut with the Dominican Summer League Mariners, hitting .255 across 57 games. Liberato spent the 2014 season with the rookie–level Arizona League Mariners, hitting .211/.325/.314 with 2 home runs, 14 RBI, and 14 stolen bases across 49 appearances.

Liberato split the 2015 season between the Low–A Everett AquaSox, Single–A Clinton LumberKings, and Double–A Jackson Generals. He played in 64 games between the three affiliates, batting a cumulative .231/.308/.403 with 5 home runs, 31 RBI, and 11 stolen bases. He returned to Clinton in 2016, playing in 100 games and hitting .258/.341/.368 with 2 home runs and 29 RBI. In 2017, Liberato split the year between Clinton and Modesto. In 125 total games, he accumulated a .246/.312/.438 slash line with career–highs in home runs (14) and RBI (50).

Liberato once more returned to Modesto in 2018, making 87 appearances and batting .250/.317/.424 with 11 home runs and 44 RBI. In 2019, Liberato was assigned to the High–A Modesto Nuts to begin the year. On June 21, 2019, Liberato was promoted to the Double–A Arkansas Travelers after hitting .283 with 7 home runs in 44 games for Modesto. He played in 52 games for Arkansas, also playing in one game for the Triple–A Tacoma Rainiers, and hit .237/.292/.330 with 2 home runs and 18 RBI.

Liberato did not play in a game in 2020 due to the cancellation of the minor league season because of the COVID-19 pandemic. He returned to action in 2021, playing in 87 games for Tacoma and hitting .279/.338/.436 with 8 home runs and 37 RBI. Liberato elected free agency following the season on November 7, 2021.

=== San Diego Padres ===
On March 13, 2022, Liberato signed a minor league contract with the San Diego Padres organization. In 99 games for the Triple–A El Paso Chihuahuas, he batted .261/.354/.541 with 20 home runs and 59 RBI. On September 9, Liberato was selected to the 40-man roster and promoted to the major leagues for the first time. In 7 games for the Padres, he went 0–for–5 in limited action. On September 27, Liberato was designated for assignment by San Diego. He cleared waivers and was sent outright to the Triple–A El Paso Chihuahuas on September 30.

Liberato spent the 2023 campaign with El Paso, hitting .261/.365/.461 with nine home runs, 35 RBI, and eight stolen bases. He elected free agency following the season on November 6, 2023.

=== Atlanta Braves ===
On November 19, 2023, Liberato signed a minor league contract with the Atlanta Braves. In 76 games split between the rookie–level Florida Complex League Braves and Triple–A Gwinnett Stripers, he slashed a combined .263/.327/.382 with four home runs and 39 RBI. Liberato was released by the Braves organization on September 23, 2024.

=== Diablos Rojos del México ===
On January 25, 2025, Liberato signed with the Diablos Rojos del México of the Mexican League. In 29 appearances for the team, Liberato slashed .373/.448/.690 with eight home runs, 29 RBI, and three stolen bases.

=== Hanwha Eagles ===
On June 17, 2025, Liberato signed with the Hanwha Eagles of the KBO League on a six-week, $50,000 contract as an injury replacement for Estevan Florial. Florial was released by the team on July 27 despite being healthy, and Liberato was signed to a full-season contract. In 62 appearances for the Eagles, he batted .313/.366/.524 with 10 home runs, 39 RBI, and one stolen base.

=== Fubon Guardians ===
On January 6, 2026, Liberato signed with the Fubon Guardians of the Chinese Professional Baseball League. He made 19 appearances for Fubon, batting .229/.280/.271 with five RBI and one stolen base. On May 5, Liberato requested and was granted his release by the Guardians.

=== Diablos Rojos del México (second stint) ===
On June 2, 2026, Liberato signed with the Diablos Rojos del México of the Mexican League.

== See also ==
- List of Major League Baseball players from the Dominican Republic
