= Chris Coste =

American baseball player and coach (born 1973)

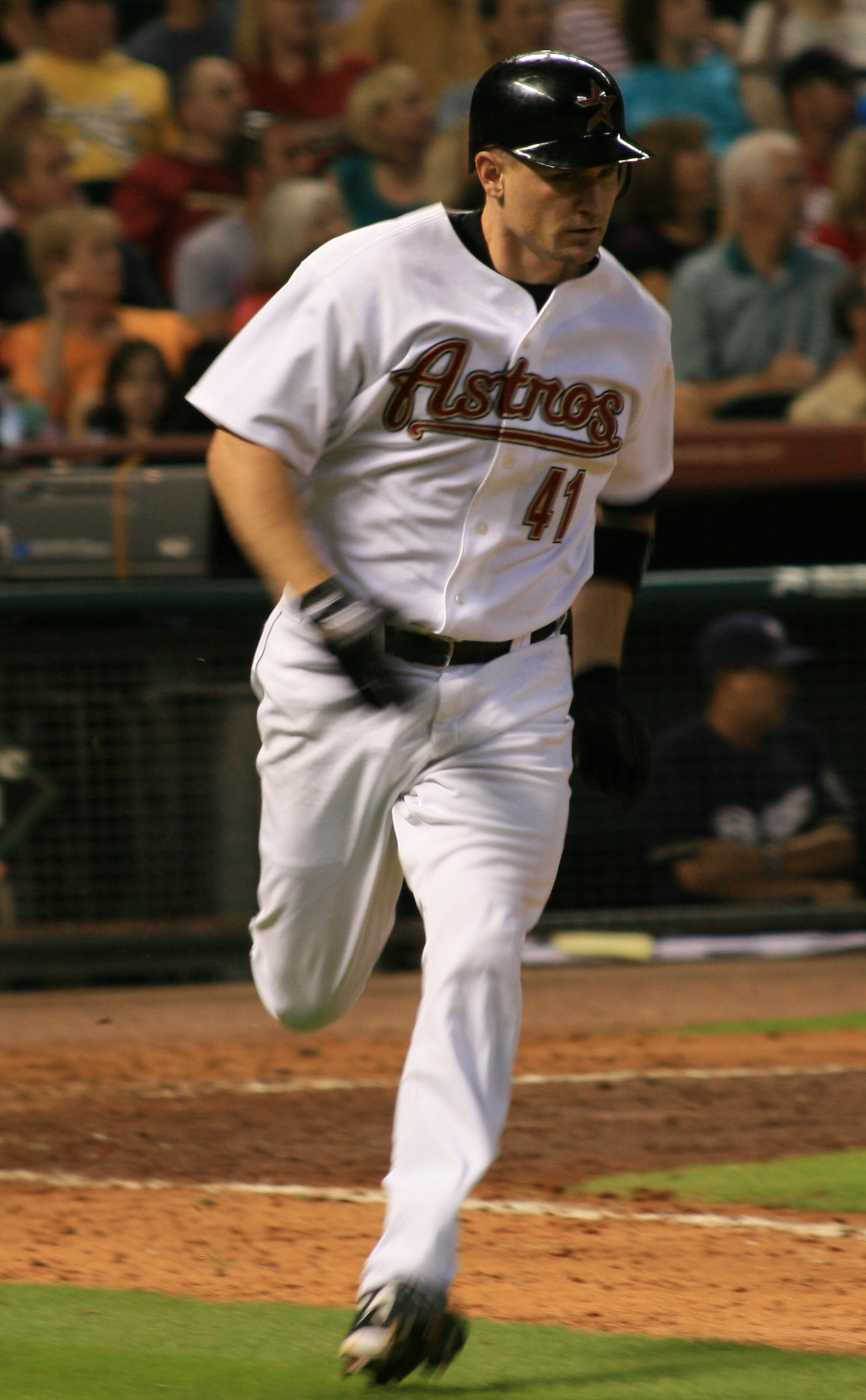
- Coste with the Houston Astros in 2009

Fargo-Moorhead RedHawks – No. 10
- Catcher / Manager
- Born: February 4, 1973 (age 53); Fargo, North Dakota, U.S.
- Batted: Right Threw: Right

MLB debut
- May 26, 2006, for the Philadelphia Phillies

Last MLB appearance
- October 2, 2009, for the Houston Astros

MLB statistics
- Batting average: .272
- Home runs: 23
- Runs batted in: 108
- Stats at Baseball Reference

Teams
- Philadelphia Phillies (2006–2009); Houston Astros (2009)

Career highlights and awards
- World Series champion (2008)

Christopher Robert Coste (born February 4, 1973) is an American author, professional baseball coach, and former catcher who is currently the manager for the Fargo-Moorhead RedHawks of the American Association of Professional Baseball. Coste first played in Major League Baseball (MLB) at age 33, after twelve seasons of independent and minor league baseball. He was an analyst on Pre Game Live and Post Game Live for the Philadelphia Phillies. He won the 2022 American Association of Professional Baseball championship with the Fargo-Moorhead RedHawks.

== Playing career ==
After attending Fargo South High School, Coste went to Kishwaukee Community College for 1 year, a Division II college Junior College, but later left. He then attended classes and played baseball for Concordia College, an NCAA Division III school in Moorhead, Minnesota, where he was a three-time All-American.

He started his professional career in 1995 playing for Brainerd, Minnesota in the independent North Central League. When the league folded in July he joined the Brandon Grey Owls in the independent Prairie League. From 1996 to 1999, he played four seasons for the Fargo-Moorhead RedHawks of the independent Northern League.

=== Early career ===
In 1999, Coste was signed by the Pittsburgh Pirates but was released after spring training and returned to the Fargo-Moorhead Redhawks. In 2000, Coste signed with the Cleveland Indians organization, having gotten significant playing with then Triple-A affiliate Buffalo Bisons. He spent 2003 with the Boston Red Sox organization and 2004 in the Milwaukee Brewers system. Coste first signed with the Phillies in 2005, spending the entire season with their Triple-A affiliate, the Scranton/Wilkes-Barre Red Barons.

=== Philadelphia Phillies ===
Coste remained with Scranton/Wilkes-Barre until his promotion to the Phillies, facilitated by his fantastic performance in 2006 spring training. After starting the 2007 season in Triple-A, Coste was called back up to the majors on May 12, 2007.

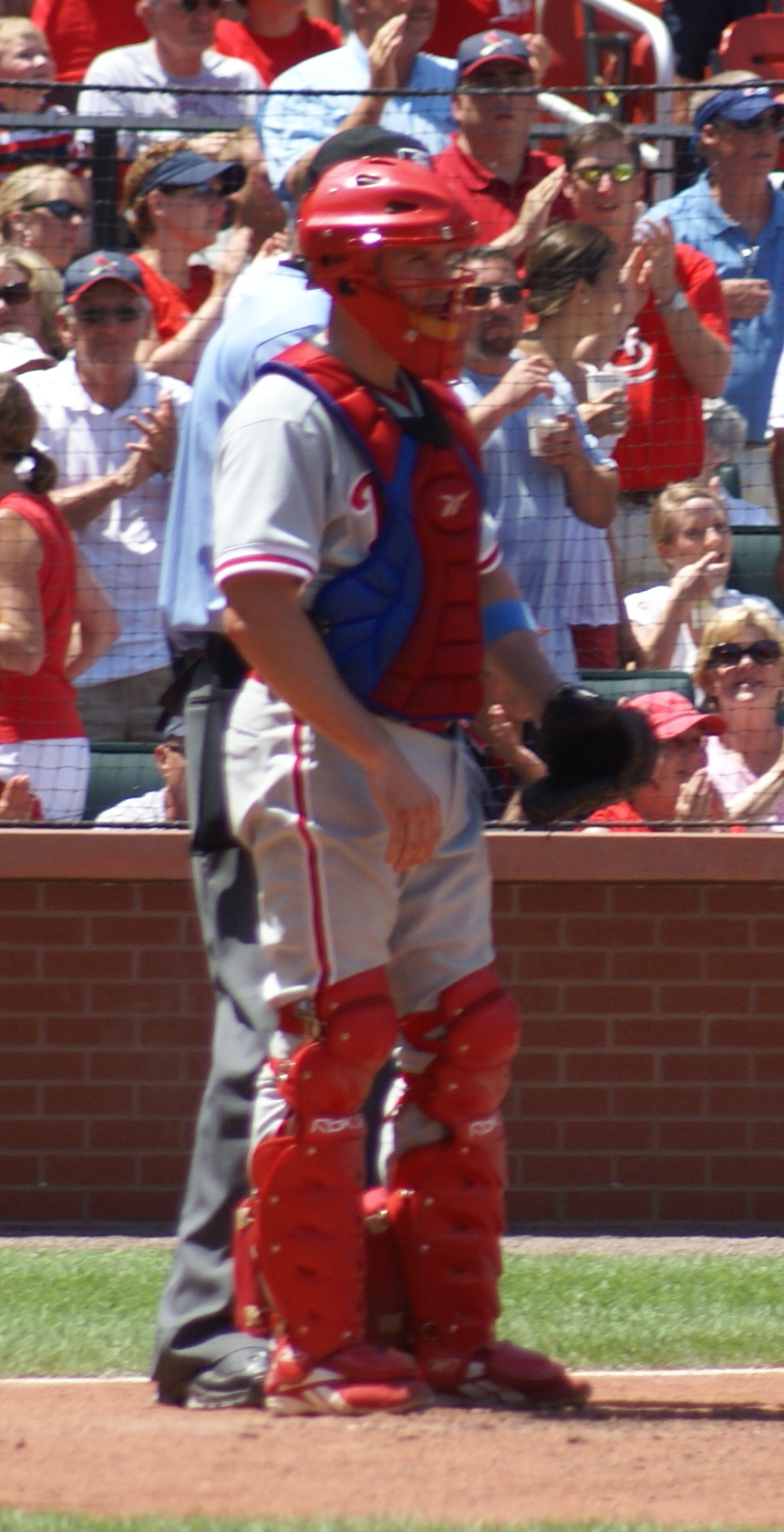
Coste with the Philadelphia Phillies in 2008

On May 25, 2007, Ryan Howard was re-activated off the DL and the Phillies sent Coste back to the minors to Double-A Reading. Coste chose to go to Reading so that he could start and play every day, and because it would help the club if he was ready, rather than being Jason Jaramillo's backup at Triple-A Ottawa. In late June 2007, Coste was called back up from Reading as a result of Jon Lieber's season-ending injury and Jayson Werth's wrist injury. Coste finished the 2007 season with a .278 batting average, 5 home runs, and 22 RBI in 48 games.

For the 2008 season, Coste was slated as the Phillies' backup catcher behind Carlos Ruiz. In a game against the Mets on August 26, 2008, Coste went 4 for 4 without even starting the game. He entered as a pinch hitter in the eighth inning, and became the first player in 63 years to appear at least that late into a game but still record 4 hits. He delivered a game-winning walk-off single in the 13th inning.

Coste was very popular with Phillies fans and had a fan club that was at every Phillies game known as the Coste Guard. They wore red bathing suits and white T-shirts. They also wore sunglasses, and sunscreen on their noses; fans could hear their whistles which they used to help cheer on the Phillies and Coste.

On October 29, 2008, Coste became the first player that originated from Division III college baseball's MIAC to win a World Series.

=== Houston Astros ===
Coste was claimed off waivers on July 10, 2009, by the Houston Astros. Due to starting first baseman Lance Berkman's injured calf, Coste found playing time at first base for the Astros.

=== New York Mets ===
On November 30, 2009, Coste signed with the New York Mets.

=== Washington Nationals ===
On March 29, 2010, Coste was claimed off waivers by the Washington Nationals. Before the season began he injured his elbow which required Tommy John surgery in May 2010. He was released on June 5, 2010. Coste retired from professional baseball after that.

== Writing career ==
=== Hey... I'm Just the Catcher ===
Coste wrote his first book about his experiences in professional baseball, Hey... I'm Just the Catcher: An Inside Look at a Northern League Season From Behind the Plate, published in 1997. This book covers his first few seasons in independent baseball leagues, mainly the RedHawks (in his hometown). This book is out of print and supplanted by his new book.

=== The 33-Year-Old Rookie ===
2008 saw the release of Coste's second autobiography, The 33-Year-Old Rookie: How I Finally Made it to the Big Leagues After Eleven Years in the Minors. The book, which chronicles Coste's first season in the majors, contains a foreword by John Kruk. This book covers Coste's professional career up through his third season (2008) with the Phillies. It includes nearly all the historical material found in his first book (independent baseball) as well as the time in the affiliated minor leagues.

Due to the success of films about athletes, such as Vince Papale of Invincible and Jim Morris of The Rookie, movie studio representatives have contacted Coste about the possibility of a movie about his struggle from career minor-leaguer to the majors.

== Later career ==
Coste was an in-studio analyst for Phillies games, and appeared on Phillies Pregame Live and Postgame Live shows. Besides these appearances, Coste was the head baseball coach at Concordia College. On December 1 2017, he was named the hitting coach for the Fargo-Moorhead RedHawks. On June 15, 2020, he was promoted to interim manager for the 2020 season following the departure of Jim Bennett. On April 20, 2021, he was named permanent manager of the RedHawks.

With the RedHawks, Coste led the franchise to a runner-up finish in the American Association in 2021, losing to the Kansas City Monarchs in the league finals. The following season, the RedHawks defeated the Milwaukee Milkmen in five games to claim their first AA crown, 24 years after Coste earned a Northern League title with the franchise. The 2022 AA title allowed the RedHawks to compete at the 2023 Baseball Champions League Americas, which the RedHawks also won with Coste as manager.

Coste led the RedHawks to winning records and consecutive playoff appearances in the 2023, 2024, and 2025 seasons, respectively, but they were unable to advance further than the Division Championship series. In 2026, he was named interim manager for the Cañeros de Los Mochis of the Mexican Pacific League during the winter offseason. Coste temporarily joined the Kane County Cougars as their bench coach for the 2026 Baseball Champions League Americas.
