= Sergio Contreras =

Mexican baseball player and coach (born 1980)

Tigres de Quintana Roo
- Outfielder / Coach
- Born: April 30, 1980 (age 45); Ciudad Obregón, Sonora, Mexico
- Bats: Right Throws: Right
- Stats at Baseball Reference
Medals
Men's baseball
Representing Mexico
Americas Baseball Cup
Bronze medal – third place	2008 Puerto Ordaz and El Tigre	Team

Sergio Alberto Contreras (born April 30, 1980) is a Mexican former professional baseball outfielder and first baseman who currently serves as the hitting coach for the Tigres de Quintana Roo of the Mexican League. He is 5'11" tall, weighs 180 pounds, and throws and bats left-handed. His twin brother, Albino, has also played professional baseball.

== Playing career ==
=== Anaheim Angels ===
On June 5, 1999, he was signed by the Anaheim Angels as a nondrafted free agent. His first professional year started out a little bumpy-in 63 games with the Angels of the Dominican Summer League, he hit only .252 with two home runs and 33 RBI.

Contreras' next season-2000 with the Butte Copper Kings-was a complete opposite of his first. In 45 games, he showed great contact by hitting .399. He managed to hit three home runs and drive in 28 runs as well. At one point in his 2000 season, Contreras had scored a run in 13 consecutive games.

In 2001, Contreras played both American and Mexican baseball. With the Rancho Cucamonga Quakes, he hit .271 with three home runs and 37 RBI. His 15 stolen bases showed that he was developing more as a base-stealer than anything else.

In 2002, Contreras played with Rancho Cucamonga again, appearing in 81 games and hitting .271. 2003 was an off-year for Contreras; 12 games with the Cedar Rapids Kernels, he hit only .176.

=== Tampa Bay Rays ===
Contreras was selected by the Tampa Bay Devil Rays in the 2003 Rule 5 draft.

=== Tigres de Quintana Roo ===
Contreras was then loaned to Mexico again and spent his entire 2004 season there. In 2005, he again spent his entire season in Mexico, hitting .314 with 9 home runs with 54 RBI. His 2006 season also was in the Mexican League, this time with the Tigres de la Angelopolis. He hit .370 in 2006. In 2007, he hit .300 with 29 steals for the Tigres de Quintana Roo. He hit .419 in the 2007 Baseball World Cup while playing for Mexico.

Contreras has never had a great eye at the plate, not once in his professional career has he walked more than 50 times in a season.

He was on the Mexico national baseball team in the 2007 Baseball World Cup, the 2008 Americas Baseball Cup and the 2009 Baseball World Cup. Contreras played for the Tigres de Quintana Roo in the Mexican League from 2005 to 2017.

=== Leones de Yucatán ===
Contreras signed with the Leones de Yucatán for the 2018 season, and began the 2019 season with the Leones. He retired at the conclusion of the 2019 season.

== Coaching career ==
On June 24, 2025, Contreras was hired as part of the coaching staff for the Saraperos de Saltillo of the Mexican League. On January 8, 2026, Contreras was fired by the Saraperos.

On January 27, 2026, Contreras was hired to serve as the hitting coach for the Tigres de Quintana Roo of the Mexican League.
