= Yosvany Alarcón =

Cuban baseball player (born 1984)

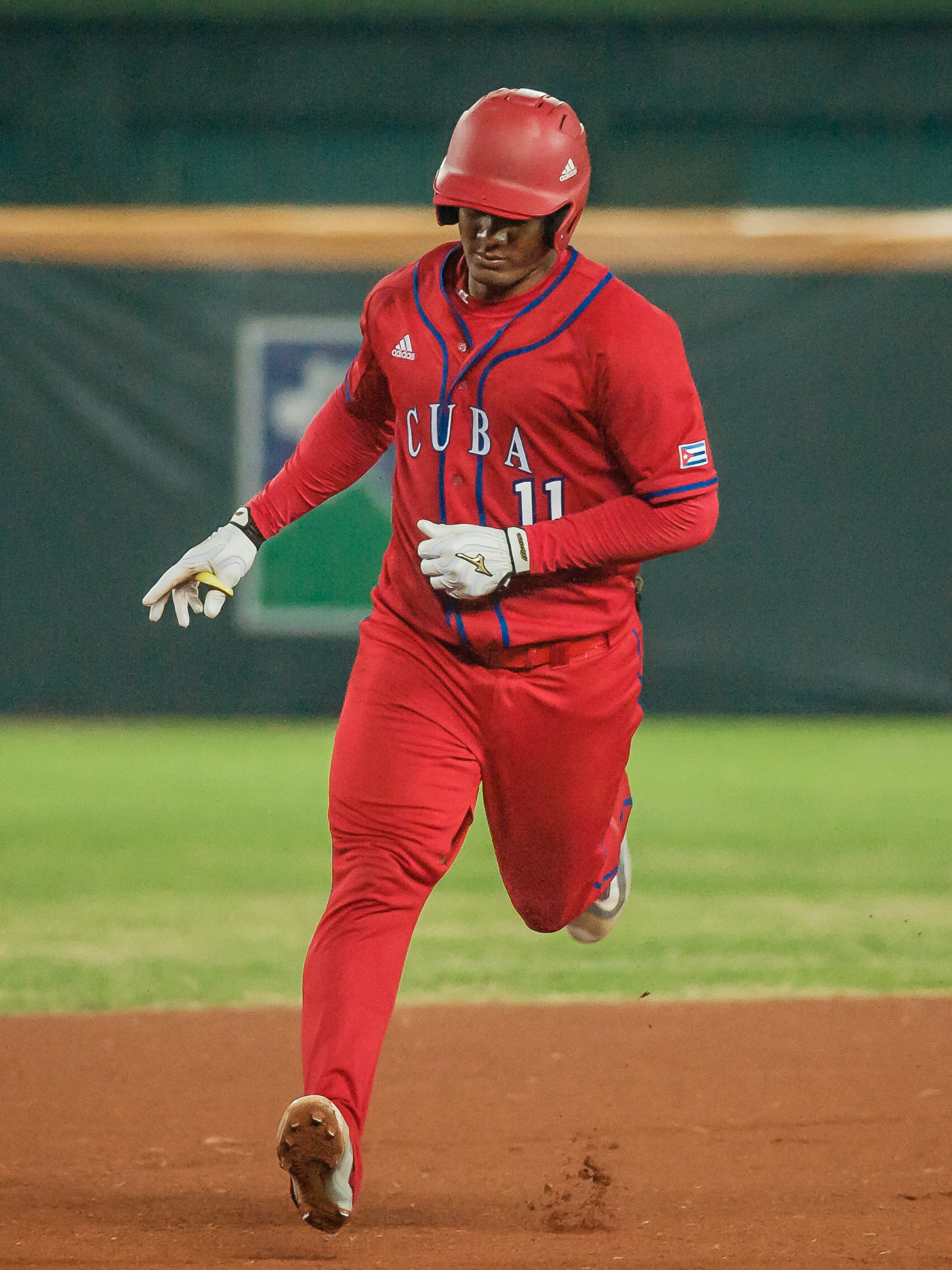
- Alarcón in 2017

Leñadores de Las Tunas
- Catcher
- Born: October 15, 1984 (age 41); Jobabo, Las Tunas Province, Cuba
- Bats: Right Throws: Right
- Stats at Baseball Reference
Medals
Men's baseball
Representing Cuba
Pan American Games
Bronze medal – third place	2015 Toronto	Team
Central American and Caribbean Games
Silver medal – second place	2018 Barranquilla	Team

Yosvani Alarcón Tardío (Note: In this Spanish name, the first or paternal surname is Alarcón and the second or maternal family name is Tardío.) (born October 15, 1984) is a Cuban professional baseball catcher for Leñadores de Las Tunas in the Cuban National Series.

Alarcón played for the Cuba national baseball team at the 2010 Intercontinental Cup, 2011 Pan American Games, 2011 Baseball World Cup, 2014 Central American and Caribbean Games, 2015 Pan American Games, 2015 WBSC Premier12, 2017 World Baseball Classic, and 2019 Pan American Games.

At the 2025 Baseball Champions League Americas with Las Tunas, he was tied for the tournament lead in hits (12) and runs batted in (13).
