= Fargo–Moorhead RedHawks =

Minor league baseball team in North Dakota

- Logo

Information
- League: American Association of Professional Baseball (2011–present) (West Division)
- Location: Fargo, North Dakota
- Ballpark: Newman Outdoor Field (1996–present); Jack Williams Stadium (1996, 6 games)
- Founded: 1996
- Nickname(s): Hawks, Woodchippers
- BCL Americas championships: 1 (2023)
- League championships: 6: NL: 1998; 2003; 2006; 2009; 2010; AA: 2022
- Division championships: 15: NL: 1996; 1997; 1998; 2000; 2003; 2004; 2005; 2006; 2007; 2008; 2010; AA: 2012; 2013; 2021; 2022
- Former league: Northern League (1996–2010)
- Colors: Black, red, white
- Retired numbers: 42, 8, 35, 7, 19, 33
- General manager: Karl Hoium
- Manager: Chris Coste
- Media: KRDK-TV; KNGF; Fargo Forum; Talk 101.9; 740 The Fan
- Website: fmredhawks.com

The Fargo–Moorhead RedHawks are a professional minor-league baseball team based in Fargo, North Dakota, in the United States. The RedHawks are members of the American Association of Professional Baseball, an official Partner League of Major League Baseball. The RedHawks have played their home games at Newman Outdoor Field since 1996, when the team started as members of the Northern League.

== History ==
The team was created as a Northern League expansion franchise in 1996 along with the now-defunct Madison Black Wolf. Chris Coste is probably the most well-known former RedHawks player and was a member of the 2008 World Series-winning Philadelphia Phillies. The RedHawks and the St. Paul Saints were among most stable and successful independent baseball teams until the Saints became part of affiliated baseball and became a Triple-A franchise in 2021.

They are reported to have had the first broadcast by minor league professional baseball on the internet.

In fifteen seasons in the Northern League, the RedHawks set the modern Northern League best single-season record for winning percentage with a 64–21 (.753) mark in 1998, set the record for most wins in a season with 68 in 2005, made it to the playoffs in 14 of 15 seasons, won five Northern League titles, and were named Baseball America's Independent Team of the Decade for the 1990s.

The 1998 team recorded a combined record of 70 wins and 22 losses during the regular season and playoffs (.761).

On October 13, 2010, the RedHawks left the Northern League, along with the Gary SouthShore RailCats, Kansas City T-Bones, and the Winnipeg Goldeyes to join the American Association for the 2011 season. The four remaining Northern League teams all folded or left the league. Accordingly, the Northern League ceased operations and folded in October 2010. As a result, the RedHawks have the distinction of being the last league champion. They have won the 2012 and 2013 American Association North Division championship.

On August 13, 2017, the Redhawks relieved Doug Simunic of his duties as field manager. Simunic had served in the position for all 22 years of the team's existence. He was replaced by pitching coach Michael Schlact, who after finishing the season on an interim basis was named the permanent manager on September 7, 2017. Michael Schlact managed one season with the RedHawks, before stepping down in February 2019 to take a coaching position within the Milwaukee Brewers minor league system. On March 20, 2019, Jim Bennett was named as the franchise's third manager. The team went on to a 63–37 record and lost in the North Division championship series to St. Paul 3–2 in the best-of-five series. Bennett was named the American Association's Manager of the Year.

In 2020, the RedHawks were one of six teams selected to compete in the condensed 60-game season due to the COVID-19 pandemic. Newman Outdoor Field served as one of the hubs where games were played; the team shared their home field with the Winnipeg Goldeyes. Prior to the start of the season on July 3, the team announced that Jim Bennett would not return as manager and named hitting coach Chris Coste interim manager.

After a sub-.500 finish in 2020, the RedHawks went 61–38 and reached the American Association Finals for the first time since joining the league in 2011, losing 3–0 to the Kansas City Monarchs. The next season, though, the RedHawks went 64–36, their best mark in a decade, avenged their loss to Kansas City, then went on to defeat the Milwaukee Milkmen 3–2 on a walk-off single from Leobaldo Pina in the tenth inning of the deciding fifth game to win their first American Association championship and sixth overall league title.

The league title earned the RedHawks the right to play in the inaugural 2023 Baseball Champions League Americas in October, 2023. The tournament, held in Mérida, Yucatán, Mexico, was won by the RedHawks, who defeated the Caimanes de Barranquilla of Colombia in the championship game, 8–0.

=== Fast facts ===
Franchise record (through 2024): 1589–1135 (.583)
Northern League record (1996–2010): 851–515 (.623)
American Association record (2011–2024): 793–665 (.544)
Northern League playoff appearances: 1996, 1997, 1998, 1999, 2000, 2001, 2003, 2004, 2005, 2006, 2007, 2008, 2009, 2010
American Association playoff appearances: 2012, 2013, 2019, 2021, 2022, 2023, 2024, 2025
Northern League division titles: 1996, 1997, 1998, 2000, 2003, 2004, 2005, 2006, 2007, 2008, 2010
American Association division titles: 2012, 2013, 2021, 2022
Northern League championships: 1998, 2003, 2006, 2009, 2010
American Association championships: 2022

== Season-by-season records ==
Season	League	Division	First Half		Second Half		Overall		Playoffs
Season	League	Division	Record	Finish	Record	Finish	Record	Win%	Playoffs
1996	NL	West	26–15	1st	27–15	1st	53–31	.631	Lost Championship Series vs. St. Paul (3–0); Won Western Division Series vs. Winnipeg (2–1)
1997	NL	West	21–21	3rd	26–16	1st	47–37	.560	Lost Western Division Series vs. Winnipeg (3–2)
1998	NL	West	31–11	1st	33–10	2nd	64–21	.753	Won Championship vs. St. Paul (3–0); Won Western Division Series vs. Winnipeg (3–1)
1999	NL	West	27–16	2nd	23–19	2nd	50–35	.588	Lost Central Divisional Series vs. Winnipeg (3–0); Won Eastern Division Series vs. Schaumburg (3–0)
2000	NL	West	28–15	1st	25–18	1st	53–33	.616	Lost Central Divisional Series vs. Duluth-Superior (3–0); Won Western Division Series vs. Winnipeg (3–0)
2001	NL	North	25–20	2nd	26–19	3rd	51–39	.567	Lost Central Division Semifinal vs. Winnipeg (3–2)
2002	NL	North	25–19	2nd	27–18	2nd	52–37	.584	Did not qualify
2003	NL	West	32–13	1st	30–15	1st	62–28	.689	Won Championship vs. Winnipeg (3–1); Won West Division Series vs. Schaumburg (3–2)
2004	NL	North	31–16	1st	23–25	3rd	55–41	.573	Lost North Division Series vs. St. Paul (3–1)
2005	NL	North	28–20	1st	40–7	1st	68–27	.716	Lost Championship Series vs. Gary SouthShore (3–2); Won North Division Series vs. Lincoln (3–1)
2006	NL	North	32–16	1st	31–17	1st	63–33	.656	Won Championship vs. Gary SouthShore (3–1); Won North Division Series vs. Winnipeg (3–2)
2007	NL	North	26–21	3rd	31–17	1st	57–38	.600	Lost North Division Series vs. Calgary (3–0)
League abandoned split-season format
Season	League	Division	Record	Finish			Overall	Win %	
2008	NL	N/A	62–34	1st			62–34	.646	Lost Semifinal vs. Kansas City (3–0)
2009	NL	N/A	53–42	3rd			53–42	.558	Won Championship vs. Gary SouthShore (3–1); Won Semifinal vs. Winnipeg (3–2)
2010	NL	N/A	61–39	1st			61–39	.610	Won Championship vs. Kansas City (3–0); Won Semifinal vs. Gary SouthShore (3–0)
2011	AA	North	44–56	3rd			44–56	.440	Did not qualify
2012	AA	North	65–35	1st			65–35	.650	Lost North Division Series vs. Winnipeg (3–0)
2013	AA	North	62–38	1st			62–38	.620	Lost North Division Series vs. Gary SouthShore (3–1)
2014	AA	North	43–56	3rd			43–56	.434	Did not qualify
2015	AA	North	44–56	3rd			44–56	.440	Did not qualify
2016	AA	North	52–48	3rd			52–48	.520	Did not qualify
2017	AA	North	57–43	2nd			57–43	.570	Did not qualify
2018	AA	North	51–49	3rd			51–49	.510	Did not qualify
2019	AA	North	63–37	2nd			63–37	.630	Lost North Division Championship Series vs. St. Paul (3–2)
2020	AA	North	28–32	5th			28–32	.467	Did not qualify
2021	AA	North	61–38	2nd			61–38	.616	Lost Championship vs. Kansas City (3–0); Won North Division Championship Series vs. Chicago (3–2); Won North Division Wild Card game vs. Milwaukee (5–0)
2022	AA	West	64–36	2nd			64–36	.640	Won Championship vs. Milwaukee Milkmen (3–2); Won West Division Championship Series vs. Kansas City (2–1); Won West Division Series vs. Winnipeg Goldeyes (2–1)
2023	AA	West	51–49	4th			51–49	.510	Lost West Division Series vs. Sioux City Explorers (2–0)
2024	AA	West	53–47	3rd			53–47	.530	Lost West Division Championship Series vs. Winnipeg Goldeyes (2–1); Won West Division Series vs. Sioux City Explorers (2–1)
2025	AA	West	55-45	4th			55-45	.550	Lost West Division Championship Series vs. Sioux Falls Canaries (3-2); Won Western Division Series vs. Kansas City Monarchs (2-1)
Totals							1644-1180	.578	22 Playoff appearances (6 League championships)

== Roster ==
Fargo-Moorhead RedHawks roster
Active roster	Coaching staff
Pitchers: 31 Garrett Alexander; 32 Shane Barringer; 21 Angelo Cabral; 26 Kyle Crigger; 18 Colten Davis; 36 Jake Dykhoff; 40 Parker Harm; 27 Tyler Jandron; 30 Tyler Jeans; 48 Kyle Johnston; 25 Kolby Kiser; 12 Naswell Paulino; 49 Orlando Rodríguez; Catchers: 41 Parker Stroh; 23 Juan Fernandez; Infielders: 5 Peter Brookshaw; 3 Aidan Byrne; 62 Osmy Gregorio ‡; 47 Michael Hallquist; 2 Nicholas Northcut; 14 Jose Sermo; Outfielders: 16 Hunter Clanin; 15 Brendon Dadson; 1 Alec Olund; 13 Lamar Sparks; 22 Dillon Thomas	Manager: 10 Chris Coste; Coaches: Caleb Carlisle (clubhouse manager); Mac Gray (equipment manager); 28 Robbie Lopez (bullpen); 24 Joe Dominiak (bench); Alyssa Tapy (trainer); Disabled list; ‡ Inactive list; § Suspended list; Roster updated July 27, 2025 Transactions

== Retired numbers ==
- 42 Jackie Robinson
- 8 Roger Maris
- 35 Jeff Bittiger (August 13, 2004)
- 7 Joe Mathis (August 7, 2009)
- 19 Jake Laber (July 19, 2021)
- 33 Doug Simunic (June 9, 2023)

== Notable alumni ==
- Tim Flakoll (founding employee)
- Brian Traxler (1996–1997)
- Darryl Motley (1996–1999)
- Chris Coste (1996–1999)
- Jeff Bittiger (1996–2002)
- Brett Roberts (1997)
- Ozzie Canseco (1998)
- Blaise Ilsley (1998)
- Jeff Jackson (1998)
- Mike Busch (1999)
- Billy Ashley (2000)
- Jason Pearson (2000)
- Cris Colón (2000–2001)
- Brent Bowers (2001)
- Rich Becker (2002)
- Mike Figga (2002)
- Dante Powell (2002)
- Dan Rohrmeier (2002)
- Eddie Williams (2002)
- Jon Weber (2002–2003, 2007)
- Juan Melo (2003, 2007)
- Ivanon Coffie (2003)
- Harry Berrios (2006)
- Jimmy Hurst (2008)
- Zach Penprase (2008–2011, 2012–2015)
- Brian McCullough (2009)
- Yurendell DeCaster (2009)
- Randall Simon (2009)
- Donzell McDonald (2009)
- Enrique Cruz (2012)
- Tyler Herron (2012, 2015–2017, 2021)
- Tyler Graham (2013)
- Justin Erasmus (2013)
- Wes Roemer (2014)
- Brandon Mann (2015)
- T.J. Bennett (2019)
- Jake Cosart (2020)
- Bradin Hagens (2019–2020)
- Cito Culver (2020)
- Jordan Patterson (2020)
- Nick Shumpert (2021)
- Kevin Herget (2021)
- Rymer Liriano (2022)
- Édgar García (2023)
- Ben Holmes (2023)
- Dillon Thomas (2023–present)
- Yoelqui Céspedes (2024)

Achievements
Preceded by Duluth–Superior Dukes; 1997	Northern League champions Fargo-Moorhead RedHawks; 1998	Succeeded by Albany-Colonie Diamond Dogs; 1999
Preceded by New Jersey Jackals; 2002	Northern League champions Fargo-Moorhead RedHawks; 2003	Succeeded by St. Paul Saints; 2004
Preceded by Gary SouthShore RailCats; 2005	Northern League champions Fargo-Moorhead RedHawks; 2006	Succeeded by Gary SouthShore RailCats; 2007
Preceded by Kansas City T-Bones; 2008	Northern League champions Fargo-Moorhead RedHawks; 2009	Succeeded by current
