= Diablos Rojos del México =

Mexican League baseball franchise in Mexico City

Logo	Cap insignia

Information
- League: Mexican League (Zona Sur)
- Location: Mexico City
- Ballpark: Estadio Alfredo Harp Helú
- Founded: 1940
- Nickname: Pandilla Escarlata (Scarlet Gang)
- BCL Americas championships: 1 (2025)
- Serie del Rey championships: 18 (1956, 1964, 1968, 1973, 1974, 1976, 1981, 1985, 1987, 1988, 1994, 1999, 2002, 2003, 2008, 2014, 2024, 2025)
- Division championships: 22 (1970, 1973, 1974, 1976, 1977, 1981, 1985, 1987, 1988, 1991, 1994, 1995, 1996, 1997, 1998, 2002, 2003, 2008, 2011, 2014, 2024, 2025)
- Former name: Rojos del México (1940–1942)
- Former ballparks: Parque del Seguro Social; Foro Sol; Estadio Fray Nano
- Colors: Red and white
- Retired numbers: 3; 7; 10; 11; 15; 16; 17; 21; 25; 32; 33
- Ownership: Diablos Rojos Del Mexico, S.A.P.I.B. De C.V.(Fundación Alfredo Harp Helú, majority shareholder)
- President: Othón Díaz Valenzuela
- Manager: Benji Gil
- Website: www.diablos.com.mx

The Diablos Rojos del Mexico (English: Mexico Red Devils) are a professional baseball team in the Mexican League based in Mexico City, Mexico. The team was founded in 1940 by Salvador Lutteroth and Ernesto Carmona. The Diablos Rojos play their home games at Estadio Alfredo Harp Helú, which has a seating capacity of 20,233 people. They have won a league-leading 18 league championships, including back-to-back championships four times, and one Baseball Champions League Americas title, after finishing undefeated as hosts in its 2025 edition.

== History ==
=== 1940s ===
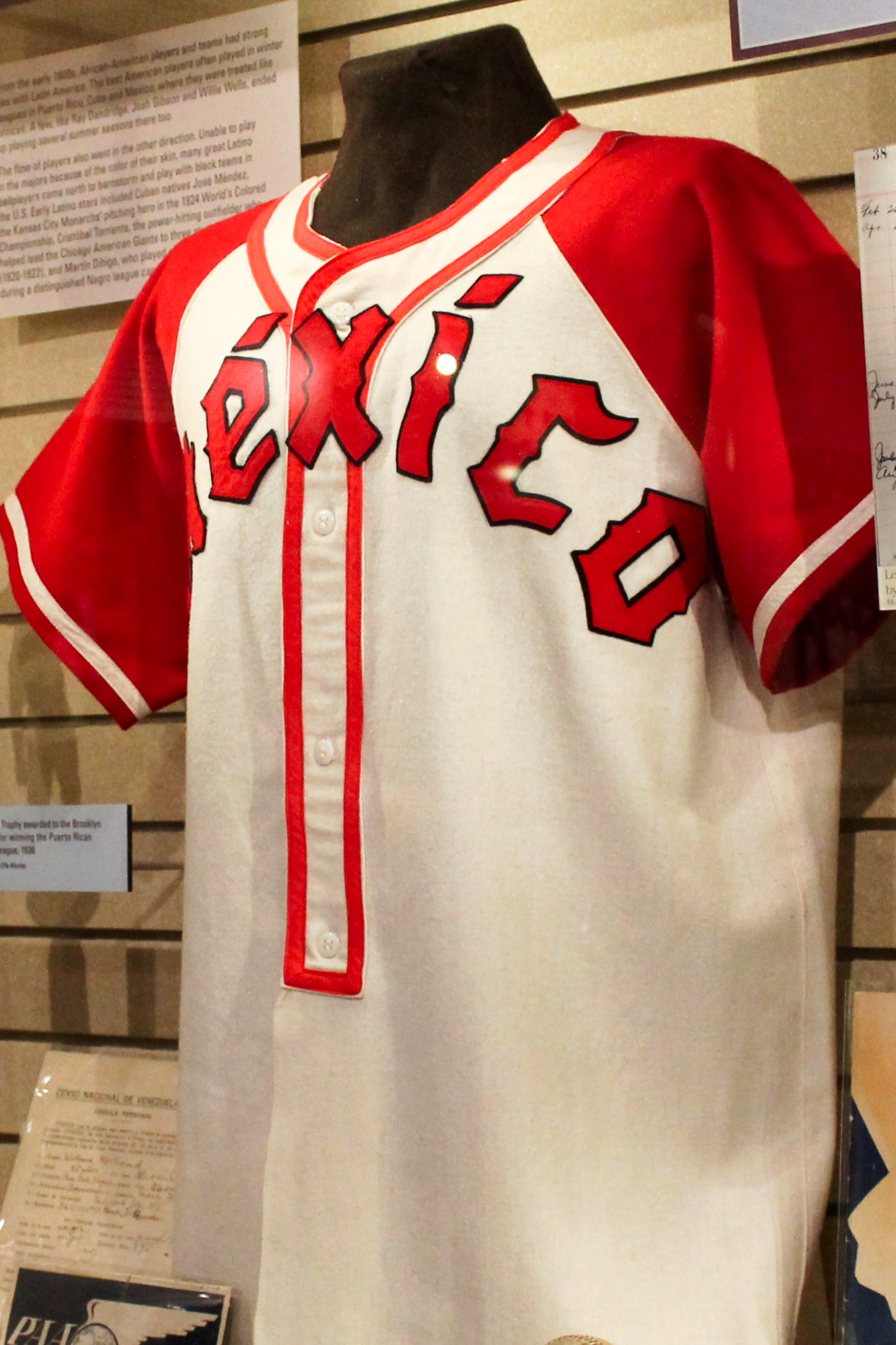
Team jersey from c. 1945 at the Baseball Hall of Fame

The team was established in January 1940 as Club México Rojo or Rojos del México (México Reds) by famous manager Ernesto Carmona and Salvador Lutteroth, a professional wrestling promoter, founder of the Empresa Mexicana de Lucha Libre, who backed the new team financially. The club was founded as a result of the Indios de Anáhuac and Tigres de Comintra, Mexico City's two professional baseball teams at the time, leaving the Mexican League after the 1939 season.

The Rojos made their debut in the 1940 Mexican League season on 30 March 1940 against the Azules de Veracruz in Veracruz City. At the time, the Azules were the best team in the league and later became the Rojos' greatest rival. During the first two seasons, they remained one of the top teams, in second place, but after this and up until 1945, they fell far behind in the standings. In 1946 and 1947, they repeated as runners-up again. The last two campaigns of the decade passed unnoticed.

During the 1942 season, on 23 April, the Rojos were losing 13–7 in the ninth and final inning, until the players began to fight back, scoring another 7 runs and beating their rivals, the Industriales de Monterrey. It was this moment when Basilio 'Brujo' Rosell exclaimed that "these Reds play like devils," giving the team their nickname.

=== 1950s ===
Mediocrity was a characteristic of the team during the first half of the decade. It was not until 1955 when El Mexico, as called by the media, would become a dominant team in the league, finishing behind only the Tigres Capitalinos and Tecolotes de Nuevo Laredo that season. It was also this year when Parque del Seguro Social (Social Security Park), with a capacity of 30,000, was opened, with an inaugural match between the Mexico Diablos and the Sultanes de Monterrey, with an 18–14 victory for the Diablos.

The following season, 1956, the Diablos hired Cuban Lázaro Salazar as manager. With him, the red team finally got their first pennant, beating their crosstown nemesis, the Tigers Capitalinos, who finished second, nine games behind the Diablos, that finished the season with an 83–37 record. After that, for the third time in their history, El Mexico finished as runner up in back to back years, 1957 and 1958.

=== 1960s ===
The team was sold to a group of shareholders in the early 1960s. The 1963 team finished in second place. Under manager Tomás Herrera, the Diablos won their second league title by defeating the Tigers in the championship game in 1964. In 1966, the team had a great season finale, but could not defeat their bi-championship rival Tigers. The campaign of 1968 began with a preseason exhibition game against Major League Baseball's New York Yankees, who were defeated by Mexico. The team capped off the season by winning their third title over the Rojos del Águila de Veracruz.

=== 1970s ===
Beginning in the 1970 season, the Mexican League used the format of two zones, North and South, and the champion would be determined in a play-off. Mexico won the 1970 North title, but lost in the final series against the Red Eagles of Veracruz by 4 games to 2.

In 1972, the team was sold again, this time to a group led by Angel Vazquez. The team won on three of the four seasons between 1973 and 1976, defeating the Saraperos de Saltillo (1973) and the Algodoneros de Unión Laguna (1974 and 1976) in the championship series. Cananea Reyes was the Reds' manager in 1974. In 1977, they could not repeat as champions and lost in the final series to Nuevo Laredo. In 1978 and 1979, the quality of the team's play declined so much that they failed to reach playoffs in 1979, something that had not happened since the creation of the league's playoff system.

=== 1980s ===
The team was acquired by Chara and Roberto Mansur in 1980. The Diablos won their seventh pennant against the Reynosa Broncos in 1981. The team claimed the league championship again in 1985 against Nuevo Laredo, although the manager, Cananea Reyes, not could be with the team for several days due to poor health. In 1987 and 1988, the Reds won back-to-back championships. In 1987, with a star player Nelson Barrera, they defeated Nuevo Laredos in the final series. Their 1988 title came against Saltillo.

=== 1990s ===
Reyes stepped down as manager following a cancer diagnosis, so Ramón Montoya took the responsibility to lead the Devils on tour in 1991. They made it to the finals, but lost to Monterrey in seven games. By 1992, the Devils, with Montoya as their manager, reached the playoffs again, but lost to the rival Tigers. In 1994, Mexico, with Marco Antonio Vazquez as manager, won the rematch, defeating Monterrey in game seven at Social Security Park to win their eleventh championship.

The next three seasons, with Vazquez as manager, were bitter in that the team managed to reach the finals, but lost every time. They were defeated by the Sultans in 1995 (4–0) and 1996 (4–1), and in 1997 by the Capitalinos Tigers in 5 games. In 1998, the Devils came back to the finals, but lost to the Guerreros de Oaxaca.

The 1999 season began with news that the Diablos would leave Social Security Park which was being demolished to build Delta Square, a modern shopping center. The team won the league championship in their final year at the stadium.

=== 2000s ===
The Diablos and the Tigers moved to the Foro Sol stadium, a building designed primarily for major events like concerts, but also with a configuration for baseball. In the first year, the Diablos lost to the Tigers in five games. In 2001, they lost to the Tigers in six games. Things changed in the next two years. In the final series of 2002, the Tigers reached the fifth game with a 3–1 lead over Mexico. In the sixth game a home run ended up deciding the game for the Reds, forcing a final game seven, which was won by the Devils, giving them their 13th pennant under the leadership of Dominican Bernie Tatis. This title was dedicated to the memories of owner Chara Mansur and player Nelson Barrera who had died that season.

Mexico returned to the playoffs the next season, defeating the Tigers in five games. The title was dedicated to the memory of the beloved batboy who remained with the team for many years, Antonio 'El Abuelo' Mora. The 2004 and 2005 campaigns were difficult for the team, but they managed to qualify for the playoffs. In 2005, they celebrated their 65th anniversary, and decided to play only Mexican players. In 2008, they returned to fielding foreign-born players as well. In the 2006, the team won first place in the South, but were defeated by the Yucatán Lions in the seventh game of the first playoff series at home.

In the 2007 season, Mexico was again in first place in the Southern Zone, but were eliminated from the playoffs by Yucatán. Daniel Fernandez was appointed as manager in 2008. This season, Mexico was first in the South Zone. In the final playoff series, played against the Sultans of Monterrey, the Rojos won in five games. For the 2009 season, Daniel Fernandez continued managing and reached the playoffs, where they faced the Vaqueros Laguna. The Diablos managed to overcome the disadvantage in the series to force a seventh game, but they were eliminated.

=== 2010s ===
Months before the start of the 2010 season Daniel Fernandez was relieved of command of the team, substituted by Puerto Rican manager Max Oliveras "Mako". In celebration of the team's 70th anniversary, the Correos de México, the national postal service of Mexico, issued three stamps commemorating team players are: José Luis Sandoval, Miguel Ojeda, and Robert Saucedo. The National Lottery of Mexico issued tickets with team badge and image of a player. The 2010 team experienced problems with the pitching staff and several players were injured during the first half of the season. But for the second half the team managed to reach first place in the Northern Zone. During the first playoff round, they faced the Saraperos of Saltillo. The Rojos led the series, 3 games to 1, but after falling in the fifth game which was a no-hitter, the Coahuilans came from behind to win the series and eliminate Mexico.

In 2012, the Diablos Rojos faced Major League Baseball's Texas Rangers in an exhibition game at Rangers Ballpark in Arlington. The Rojos previously played an exhibition game against the Rangers in 1974 when they were managed by Billy Martin and the Reds were managed by Benjamin "Cananea" Reyes. Texas won both games.

=== 2020s ===
In 2024, the Diablos Rojos claimed their first Mexican League title in a decade and were invited to participate in the 2025 Baseball Champions League Americas tournament as a result, which they also won.

== Rivalries ==
The Diablos have a long-standing rivalry with the Tigres de Quintana Roo, who previously played in Mexico City but now play in Cancún. That rivalry was shown in the 2011 Serie del Rey.

== Stadiums ==
In 2019, the Diablos moved into their new stadium, the Estadio Alfredo Harp Helú, located in the Magdalena Mixhuca Sports City. The club previously played in the Estadio Fray Nano, a 5,200-capacity ballpark in Mexico City, from 2015 to 2018. From 2000 to 2014, they played at Foro Sol (English: Sun Forum), a sports and concert venue built in 1993 in the Autódromo Hermanos Rodríguez in eastern Mexico City. From 1940 to 1999, the Diablos played home games at Parque del Seguro Social (English: Social Security Park).

== Roster ==
Diablos Rojos del México roster
Players		Coaches/Other
Pitchers: 20 (Japan) Tomohiro Anraku; 59 (Mexico) Jordy Arias ∞; 96 (United States) Trevor Bauer; 9 (Mexico) Humberto Castellanos; 57 (Mexico) Efraín Contreras; 13 (United States) Justin Courtney; 58 (Mexico) Edwin Fierro; 12 (Mexico) Victor González; 48 (Mexico) Gerardo Gutiérrez; 19 (United States) Brooks Hall; 93 (Mexico) Juan Pablo López; 54 (Dominican Republic) J. C. Mejía; 84 (Mexico) Jorge Monroy ∞; 66 (United States) Stephen Nogosek; 77 (Venezuela) Ricardo Pinto; 51 (Mexico) Gerardo Reyes; 56 (Mexico) Luis Rodríguez; 92 (Mexico) Óscar Rojas; 53 (United States) Nick Vespi; 43 (United States) Jimmy Yacabonis	Catchers: 70 (Mexico) Gabriel Gutiérrez; 18 (Dominican Republic) Francisco Mejía; 36 (Venezuela) Carlos Pérez; Infielders: 27 (Venezuela) Franklin Barreto; 22 (Dominican Republic) Robinson Canó; 47 (Mexico) Juan Carlos Gamboa; 61 (Mexico) Moisés Gutiérrez; 46 (United States) José Marmolejos; 8 (Mexico) Carlos Sepúlveda ∞; 24 (United States) Jon Singleton; 30 (Mexico) Roberto Valenzuela; 76 (Mexico) Jesús Villalobos; Outfielders: 68 (United States) Sebastián Enríquez; 23 (Venezuela) Ramón Flores; 0 (Dominican Republic) Luis Liberato; 31 (Mexico) Julián Ornelas; 67 (Venezuela) José Pirela	Manager: 30 (United States) Lorenzo Bundy; Coaches: 63 (Mexico) Jesús Arredondo (third base); -- (Mexico) Alfredo Amézaga (first base); 19 (United States) Brooks Hall (pitching); -- (Mexico) Héctor Hurtado (assistant); 98 (Mexico) Carlos Sievers (hitting); 62 (Mexico) Sergio Valenzuela (assistant); 7-day injured list; ~ Development list; # Rehab assignment; ∞ Reserve list; ‡ Restricted list; § Suspended list; † Temporarily inactive list; Roster updated September 24, 2026; Transactions; → More rosters: MiLB • Mexican League

=== Retired numbers ===
Salomé Barojas; P 1981–1996	Nelson Barrera; 3B / BD; 1977–2002	Lázaro Salazar; Manager; 1956–1957	Alfredo Ortiz; P 1963–1984	Héctor Espino; 1B; 1981	Antonio Mora; Batboy ?–2003	Ramón Montoya; CF; 1962–1983	Cananea Reyes; Manager; 1974–1991	José Luis Sandoval; SS; 1981–1996

== Championships ==
Season	Manager	Opponent	Series score	Record
1956	(Cuba) Lázaro Salazar	No final series		83–37
1964	(United States) Tomás Herrera	No final series		82–58
1968	(United States) Tomás Herrera	No final series		82–58
1973	(Cuba) Wilfredo Calviño	Saraperos de Saltillo	4–3	89–60
1974	(Mexico) Cananea Reyes	Algodoneros de Unión Laguna	4–0	87–65
1976	(Mexico) Cananea Reyes	Algodoneros de Unión Laguna	4–2	87–69
1981	(Dominican Republic) Winston Llenas	Broncos de Reynosa	4–3	87–54
1985	(Mexico) Cananea Reyes	Tecolotes de los Dos Laredos	4–1	92–56
1987	(Mexico) Cananea Reyes	Tecolotes de los Dos Laredos	4–1	87–53
1988	(Mexico) Cananea Reyes	Saraperos de Saltillo	4–1	94–47
1994	(Mexico) Marco Antonio Vázquez	Sultanes de Monterrey	4–3	94–49
1999	(United States) Tim Johnson	Tigres de México	4–2	86–49
2002	(Dominican Republic) Bernie Tatís	Tigres de la Angelópolis	4–3	86–43
2003	(Dominican Republic) Bernie Tatís	Tigres de la Angelópolis	4–1	80–46
2008	(Mexico) Daniel Fernández	Sultanes de Monterrey	4–1	78–42
2014	(Mexico) Miguel Ojeda	Pericos de Puebla	4–0	82–44
2024	(United States) Lorenzo Bundy	Sultanes de Monterrey	4–0	87–23
2025	(United States) Lorenzo Bundy	Charros de Jalisco	4–0	79–27
Total championships			18	

== Baseball Champions League Americas record ==
Year	Venue	Finish	Wins	Losses	Win%	Manager
2025	Mexico City	1st	4	0	1.000	(United States) Lorenzo Bundy
Total			4	0	1.000	
