= Yadir Drake =

Cuban baseball player (born 1990)

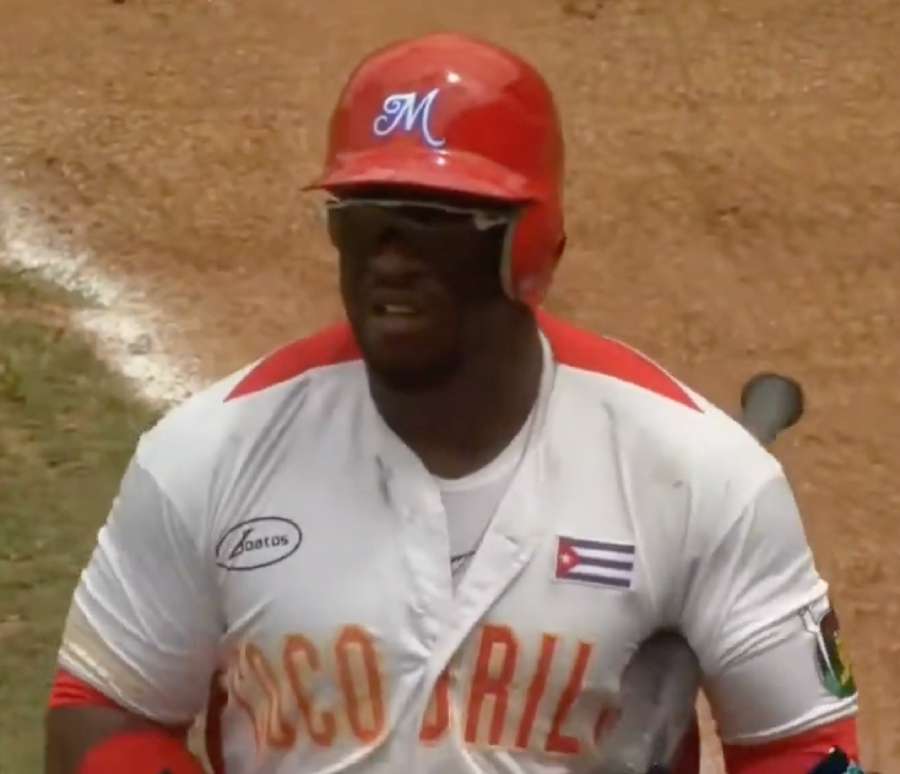
- Drake with Cocodrilos de Matanzas in 2021

Algodoneros de Unión Laguna – No. 33
- Outfielder
- Born: April 12, 1990 (age 36); Matanzas, Cuba
- Bats: Right Throws: Right

NPB debut
- July 3, 2017, for the Hokkaido Nippon-Ham Fighters

NPB statistics (through 2017 season)
- Batting average: .232
- Home runs: 1
- Runs batted in: 3
- Stats at Baseball Reference

Teams
- Hokkaido Nippon-Ham Fighters (2017)

Yadir Drake Dominguez (born April 12, 1990) is a Cuban professional baseball outfielder for the Algodoneros de Unión Laguna of the Mexican League. He has previously played in Nippon Professional Baseball (NPB) for the Hokkaido Nippon-Ham Fighters.

== Career ==
=== Amateur career ===
Drake played for the Matanzas team in the Cuban National Series.

He defected to Mexico in 2011. He then played with a couple of semi-professional minor league teams in Mexico before participating in a workout for Major League Baseball scouts in August 2014.

=== Los Angeles Dodgers ===
On August 25, 2014, Drake was signed as an international free agent by the Los Angeles Dodgers. He hit .310 in seven games for the Single–A Great Lakes Loons of the Midwest League at the start of the 2015 season, and was promptly promoted to the High–A Rancho Cucamonga Quakes of the California League. After another seven games for the Quakes (where hit .407) Drake was again quickly promoted, this time to the Double–A Tulsa Drillers of the Texas League. In 106 games for Tulsa, he hit .269. After the season, he was selected to the roster for the Mexico national baseball team at the 2015 WBSC Premier12.

Drake returned to Tulsa to start the 2016 season. He hit only .109 in 19 games and was released on May 27, 2016.

=== Generales de Durango ===
Drake signed with the Generales de Durango of the Mexican League for the 2017 season and hit .385 in 71 games for them with 14 homers and 61 RBI. His .385 average led the league in 2017.

=== Hokkaido Nippon-Ham Fighters ===
On June 29, 2017, the Hokkaido Nippon-Ham Fighters of Nippon Professional Baseball announced that they had signed Drake for the remainder of the season.

=== Generales de Durango (second stint) ===
Drake re-signed with the Generales de Durango for the 2018 season.

=== Sultanes de Monterrey ===
On April 28, 2018, Drake was traded to the Sultanes de Monterrey of the Mexican League.

=== Leones de Yucatán ===
On December 10, 2019, Drake was traded to the Leones de Yucatán of the Mexican League. Drake did not play in a game in 2020 due to the cancellation of the Mexican League season because of the COVID-19 pandemic. He played in 54 games for the Leones in 2021, hitting .362/.412/.604 with 12 home runs and 40 RBI.

In 2022, Drake played in 84 games for Yucatán, slashing .328/.379/.530 with 14 home runs and 61 RBI. Drake won the Mexican League Championship with the Leones in 2022. In 2023, Drake played in 89 games for the Leones, batting .360/.426/.477 with six home runs and 66 RBI.

In 2024, Drake played in 69 games, and hit .312/.363/.535 with 14 home runs and 52 RBI. In 2025, Drake made 89 appearances, posting another stellar season with a .362/.431/.593 line while belting 20 home runs and driving in 72 runs. In 2026, Drake was hitting .275/.336/.435 with five home runs and 15 RBI prior to his trade.

=== Algodoneros de Unión Laguna ===
On May 28, 2026, Drake was traded to the Algodoneros de Unión Laguna of the Mexican League in exchange for Alfonso Rivas.

== Personal ==
Drake became a naturalized Mexico citizen.
