= Lorenzo Bundy =

American baseball player and manager (born 1959)

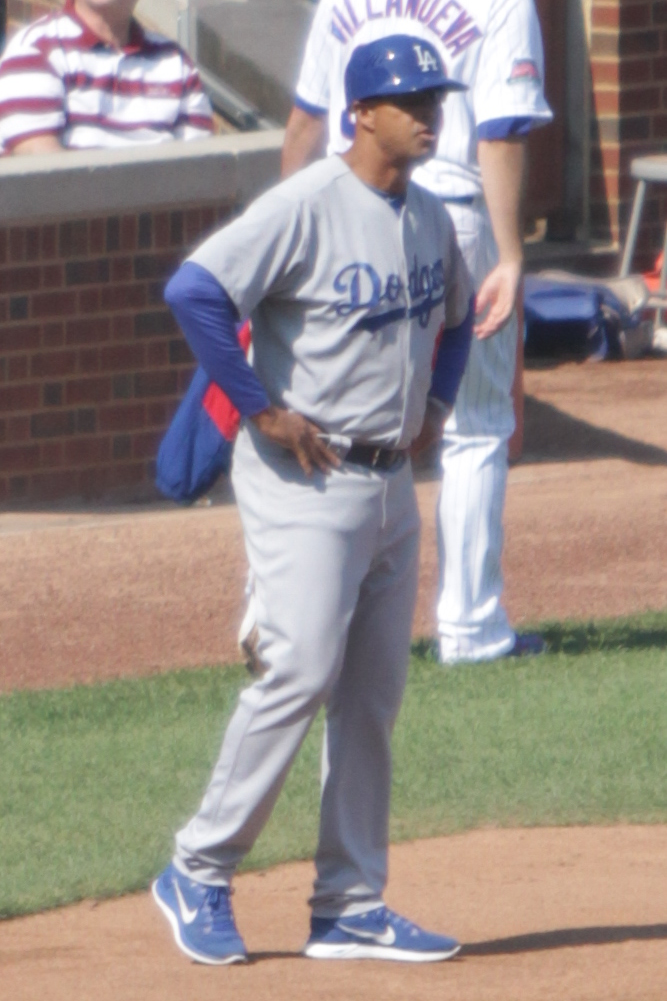
- Bundy with the Los Angeles Dodgers in 2014

Diablos Rojos del México
- Sporting advisor
- Born: November 6, 1959 (age 66); Philadelphia, Pennsylvania, U.S.
- Bats: Left Throws: Right
- Stats at Baseball Reference

Teams
- As coach: Colorado Rockies (1999); Arizona Diamondbacks (2004; 2009); Los Angeles Dodgers (2014–2015); Miami Marlins (2016–2017)

Charles Lorenzo Bundy (born November 6, 1959) is an American former professional baseball player and currently serves as a sporting advisor for the Diablos Rojos del México of the Mexican League and manager for the Tomateros de Culiacán of the Mexican Pacific League. He has held Major League Baseball (MLB) coaching positions with the Colorado Rockies, Arizona Diamondbacks, Los Angeles Dodgers, and Miami Marlins.

== Playing career ==
Bundy attended James Madison University, where he was a standout first baseman and ranks second on the school's all-time home run list.

Bundy was drafted by the Baltimore Orioles in the 22nd round of the 1977 Major League Baseball draft but did not sign.

After college, Bundy signed with the Texas Rangers as an undrafted free agent and also spent time in the Pittsburgh Pirates and Montreal Expos systems.

Bundy played eight seasons in the minor leagues and the Mexican League, finishing with a career batting average of .318 with 135 home runs and 535 RBI.

== Coaching career ==
Bundy retired as a player after the 1989 season and became a manager in the Montreal Expos farm system, with the rookie-level Gulf Coast League Expos in 1990 and then in the South Atlantic League with the Sumter Flyers and Albany Polecats.

From 1993–1994, Bundy managed the Burlington Bees in the Midwest League.

Bundy moved to the Florida Marlins system in 1995 as the hitting coach for the Brevard County Manatees in the Florida State League. He was promoted to manager of the Manatees for the 1997 season. In 1998, the Marlins named Bundy the minor league outfield and baserunning coach for their whole farm system.

In 1999, Bundy was hired as the bullpen coach for the Colorado Rockies' Major League staff under manager Jim Leyland. When Leyland left the team after the season, Bundy served as the Rockies' minor league outfield and baserunning coach from 2000–2001.

In 2002, Bundy joined the Pawtucket Red Sox of the International League as the team's hitting coach for 2002, before holding the same position in 2003 with the El Paso Diablos of the Texas League. The Diablos led the league with a .282 batting average that season.

In 2004, Bundy was hired by the Arizona Diamondbacks as the hitting coach for the Tucson Sidewinders, a position he held through 2006. The Sidewinders led the Pacific Coast League with a .289 batting average and 844 runs scored in 2006, and captured the PCL and Triple-A championships. He also briefly served as interim bench coach for the Diamondbacks during the second half of the 2004 season after manager Bob Brenly and most of his staff were abruptly fired.

In 2007, Bundy joined the Los Angeles Dodgers organization as the manager for the Triple-A Las Vegas 51s of the Pacific Coast League, a role he maintained in 2008 as well.

Bundy returned to the Diamondbacks in 2009 as the team's first base coach under manager Bob Melvin.

After Melvin was fired, Bundy returned to the Dodgers system as manager of the rookie-level Arizona League Dodgers in 2010, and he then became manager of the Albuquerque Isotopes from 2011–2013 and was named Pacific Coast League Manager of the Year in 2012.

On November 11, 2013, Bundy was named the new third base coach of the Dodgers. He was removed from that position on August 17, 2015, but remained on the staff as an outfield coach for the remainder of the season.

Bundy has also managed in the Mexican Pacific League (1991–present), winning three championships throughout the course of his coaching career: one with the Navojoa during the 1999–2000 season, another with Hermosillo during the 2006–2007 season, and his most recent with Mazatlán during the 2008-2009 season. He has also twice been named Manager of the Year.

On December 4, 2015, Bundy was announced as the new outfield and baserunning coach for the Miami Marlins. Following the 2017 season, it was revealed that Bundy would not return in his role with the team.

Bundy was named manager of the Pericos de Puebla of the Mexican League for the 2018 season.

On August 15, 2018, Bundy was announced as the new manager of the Tomateros de Culiacan of the Mexican Pacific League for the 2018-19 season. However, he was fired after an 8–10 start to the season.

In November 2018, Bundy was named the new manager for the Generales de Durango of the Mexican League for the 2019 season. He was fired on May 20, 2019, following a 15–24 start to the season. Bundy later joined the Acereros de Monclova as their bench coach. Later in 2019, he returned to manage the Mayos de Navojoa of the Mexican Pacific League.

On January 6, 2020, Bundy was named the manager of the Binghamton Rumble Ponies, the Double-A New York Mets affiliate. However, the 2020 season was eventually canceled as a result of the COVID-19 pandemic. Bundy returned as manager of the Rumble Ponies in 2021, posting a 47–60 record.

On February 2, 2022, Bundy was announced as new manager of the Winston-Salem Dash, the High-A affiliate of the Chicago White Sox. After one season with Winston-Salem, Bundy was named the manager of the Birmingham Barons, Chicago's Double-A affiliate.

On November 14, 2023, Bundy was appointed as manager of the Diablos Rojos del México of the Mexican League. In 322 games (including playoffs) during his tenure, the team went 236–86 (.732) and won back-to-back championships in the Serie del Rey for the 2024 and 2025 seasons. He also led the team to victory at the 2025 Baseball Champions League Americas. Following a failed attempt at a third consecutive championship in 2026, the Diablos announced that Bundy would transition from manager to a front-office role beginning in 2027.

Preceded by Lee Tinsley	Arizona Diamondbacks first base coach 2009	Succeeded by Matt Williams
Preceded by Tim Wallach	Albuquerque Istotopes Manager; 2011–2013	Succeeded by Damon Berryhill
Preceded by Tim Wallach	Los Angeles Dodgers Third Base Coach; 2014–2015	Succeeded by Ron Roenicke
