= Carlos Sepúlveda =

Mexican baseball player (born 1996)

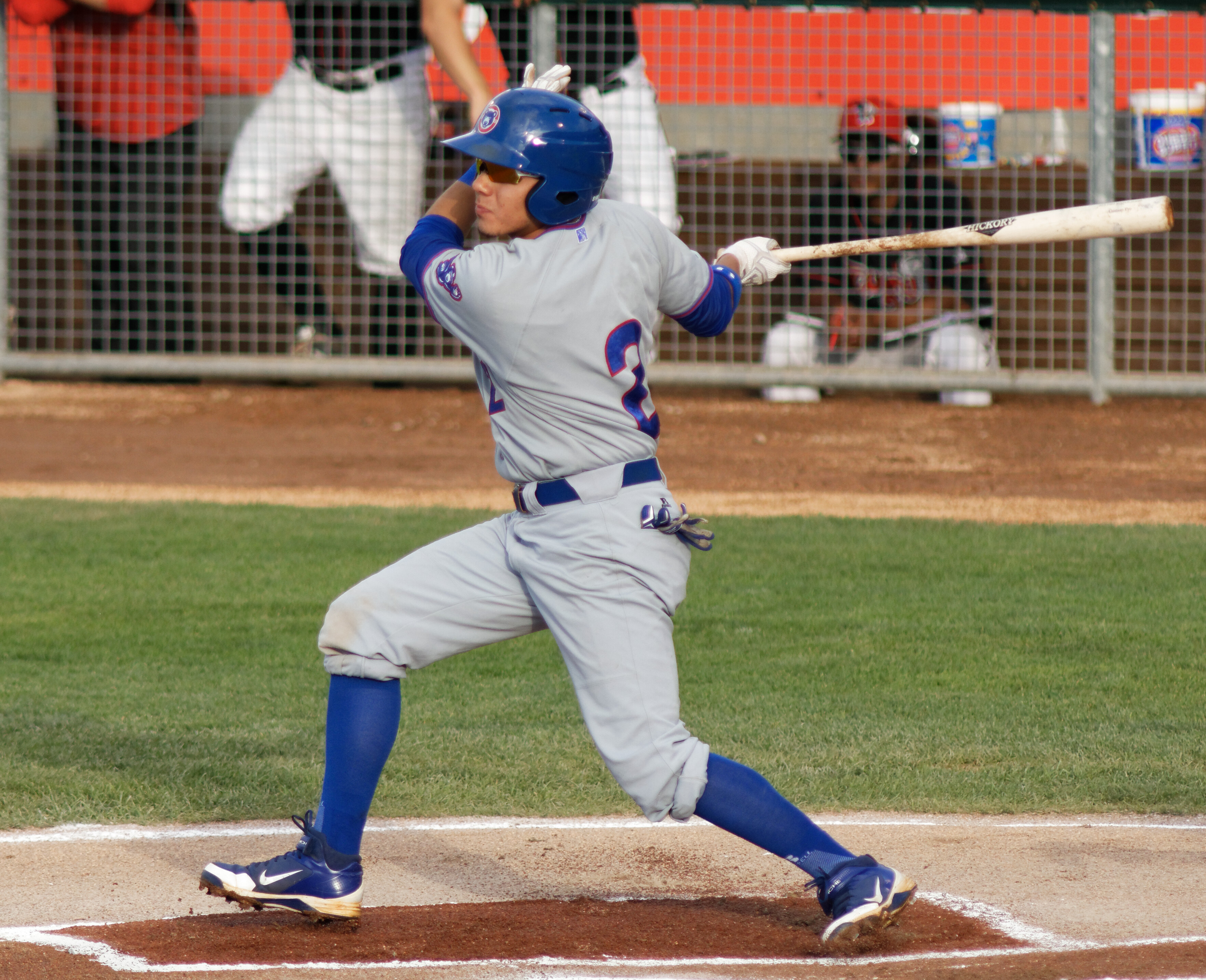
- Sepúlveda in 2016

Diablos Rojos del México – No. 8
- Second baseman / Shortstop
- Born: 27 August 1996 (age 30); Monclova, Coahuila, Mexico
- Bats: Left Throws: Right
- Stats at Baseball Reference

Carlos Alan Sepúlveda Salazar (born 27 August 1996) is a Mexican professional baseball infielder for the Diablos Rojos del México of the Mexican League. Sepúlveda spent six seasons in the minor leagues with the Chicago Cubs organization before making his Mexican League debut in 2023 with the Diablos Rojos.

== Early career ==
Sepúlveda was born on 27 August 1996 in Monclova, Coahuila. In 2011, he joined the Alfredo Harp Helú Baseball Academy in San Bartolo Coyotepec, Oaxaca, which is owned by the Diablos Rojos del México of the Mexican League.

== Professional career ==
=== Chicago Cubs ===
On 18 December 2014, aged 18, Sepúlveda was signed by the Chicago Cubs organization as an international free agent.

In 2015, Sepúlveda made his professional debut with the rookie-level Arizona Complex League Cubs, hitting .281/.351/.308 with 25 RBI. The next year, he played for the South Bend Cubs of the Single-A Midwest League, appearing in 80 games, batting .310/.366/.374 with one home run and 24 RBI. In 2017, Sepúlveda played for the Myrtle Beach Pelicans of the High-A Carolina League, hitting .196/.272/.214 and seven RBI in 28 games; he also appeared in nine games with the AZL Cubs.

In 2019, Sepúlveda made 112 appearances for Myrtle Beach, hitting .243/.342/.285 with 36 RBI and 14 stolen bases.

=== Los Angeles Dodgers ===
On 12 December 2019, the Los Angeles Dodgers selected Sepúlveda from the Cubs in the Rule 5 draft, and assigned him to the Triple-A Oklahoma City Dodgers. He did not play in a game in 2020 due to the cancellation of the minor league season because of the COVID-19 pandemic. Sepúlveda was released by the Dodgers on 22 March 2021, without having appeared in a single game for the organization.

=== Chicago Cubs (second stint) ===
On 7 June 2021, Sepúlveda signed a minor league contract to return to the Chicago Cubs organization, who subsequently assigned him to the Tennessee Smokies of the Double-A Southern League. He made 73 appearances for the Smokies, batting .213/.318/.293 with three home runs and 21 RBI. In 2022, Sepúlveda played for the Iowa Cubs of the Triple-A International League, appearing in 24 games and hitting .245/.349/.283 with nine RBI and one stolen base. He elected free agency following the season on 10 November 2022.

=== Diablos Rojos del México ===
On 3 February 2023, Sepúlveda joined the Diablos Rojos del México of the Mexican League (LMB). He made his LMB debut on 21 April appearing as a pinch hitter against the Tigres de Quintana Roo in the Estadio Alfredo Harp Helú. In 2023, Sepúlveda appeared in 73 contests for the Diablos, hitting .314/.411/.400 with three home runs, 37 RBI, and two stolen bases.

Sepúlveda made 58 appearances for the team during the 2024 season, slashing .340/.442/.431 with one home run, 31 RBI, and six stolen bases. Sepúlveda made 69 appearances for México in 2025, batting .395/.503/.515 with two home runs, 38 RBI, and 12 stolen bases. With the team, he won his second consecutive Serie del Rey.
