= 1969 Chicago White Sox season =

1969 Chicago White Sox
- League: American League
- Division: West
- Ballpark: White Sox Park
- City: Chicago
- Owners: Arthur Allyn, Jr., John Allyn
- General managers: Ed Short
- Managers: Al López, Don Gutteridge
- Television: WFLD (Jack Drees, Mel Parnell)
- Radio: WMAQ (AM) (Bob Elson, Red Rush)

The 1969 Chicago White Sox season was the team's 69th season in the major leagues, and its 70th season overall. They finished with a record of 68–94, good enough for fifth place in the newly established American League West, 29 games behind the first-place Minnesota Twins.

The White Sox nearly left Chicago in 1969. White Sox owner Arthur Allyn, Jr. considered overtures from Bud Selig and other Milwaukee interests to move the club to County Stadium. Instead, he sold to his brother, John. The newly established Seattle Pilots would move there a year after their inaugural season.

== Offseason ==
- October 15, 1968: Hoyt Wilhelm was drafted from the White Sox by the Kansas City Royals as the 49th pick in the 1968 MLB expansion draft.
- December 5, 1968: Jack Fisher was traded by the White Sox to the Cincinnati Reds for Don Pavletich and Don Secrist.

== Regular season ==
=== Season standings ===
AL West
Team	W	L	Pct.	GB	Home	Road
Minnesota Twins	97	65	.599	—	57‍–‍24	40‍–‍41
Oakland Athletics	88	74	.543	9	49‍–‍32	39‍–‍42
California Angels	71	91	.438	26	43‍–‍38	28‍–‍53
Kansas City Royals	69	93	.426	28	36‍–‍45	33‍–‍48
Chicago White Sox	68	94	.420	29	41‍–‍40	27‍–‍54
Seattle Pilots	64	98	.395	33	34‍–‍47	30‍–‍51

=== Record vs. opponents ===
1969 American League records Sources:
Team	BAL	BOS	CAL	CWS	CLE	DET	KC	MIN	NYY	OAK	SEA	WAS
Baltimore	—	10–8	6–6	9–3	13–5	11–7	11–1	8–4	11–7	8–4	9–3	13–5
Boston	8–10	—	8–4	5–7	12–6	10–8	10–2	7–5	11–7	4–8	6–6	6–12
California	6–6	4–8	—	9–9	8–4	5–7	9–9	7–11	3–9	6–12	9–9–1	5–7
Chicago	3–9	7–5	9–9	—	8–4	3–9	8–10	5–13	3–9	8–10	10–8	4–8
Cleveland	5–13	6–12	4–8	4–8	—	7–11	7–5	5–7	9–8	5–7	7–5	3–15
Detroit	7–11	8–10	7–5	9–3	11–7	—	8–4	6–6	10–8	7–5	10–2	7–11
Kansas City	1–11	2–10	9–9	10–8	5–7	4–8	—	8–10	5–7–1	8–10	10–8	7–5
Minnesota	4–8	5–7	11–7	13–5	7–5	6–6	10–8	—	10–2	13–5	12–6	6–6
New York	7–11	7–11	9–3	9–3	8–9	8–10	7–5–1	2–10	—	6–6	7–5	10–8
Oakland	4–8	8–4	12–6	10–8	7–5	5–7	10–8	5–13	6–6	—	13–5	8–4
Seattle	3–9	6–6	9–9–1	8–10	5–7	2–10	8–10	6–12	5–7	5–13	—	7–5
Washington	5–13	12–6	7–5	8–4	15–3	11–7	5–7	6–6	8–10	4–8	5–7	—

=== Opening Day lineup ===
- Luis Aparicio, SS
- Carlos May, LF
- Bill Melton, 3B
- Gail Hopkins, 1B
- Duane Josephson, C
- Buddy Bradford, RF
- Ken Berry, CF
- Sandy Alomar Sr., 2B
- Gary Peters, P

=== Potential relocation to Milwaukee ===
In 1969, the White Sox schedule in Milwaukee was expanded to include 11 home games (one against every other franchise in the American League at the time). Although those games were attended by slightly fewer fans (198,211 fans, for an average of 18,019) they represented a greater percentage of the total White Sox attendance than the previous year – over one-third of the fans who went to Sox home games in 1969 did so at Milwaukee County Stadium (in the remaining 70 home dates in Chicago, the Sox drew 391,335, for an average of 5,591 per game). Bud Selig felt this fan support lent legitimacy to his quest for a Milwaukee franchise, and he went into the 1969 owners meetings with high hopes.

=== Notable transactions ===
- May 14, 1969: Sandy Alomar Sr. and Bob Priddy were traded by the White Sox to the California Angels for Bobby Knoop.
- June 5, 1969: Rich Hinton was drafted by the White Sox in the 3rd round of the 1969 Major League Baseball draft (secondary phase).

=== Roster ===
1969 Chicago White Sox
Roster
Pitchers: 26 Gary Bell; 30 Cisco Carlos; 41 Paul Edmondson; 32 Sammy Ellis; 32 Jack Hamilton; 20 Joe Horlen; 25 Tommy John; 42 Bart Johnson; 40 Danny Lazar; 23 Bob Locker; 24 Danny Murphy; 49 Jerry Nyman; 47 Dennis O'Toole; 21 Dan Osinski; 43 Gary Peters; 26 Bob Priddy; 45 Fred Rath Sr.; 27 Don Secrist; 31 Hoyt Wilhelm; 28 Wilbur Wood; 46 Billy Wynne	Catchers: 32 Doug Adams; 10 Chuck Brinkman; 12 Ed Herrmann; 5 Duane Josephson; 7 Don Pavletich; Infielders: 1 Sandy Alomar Sr.; 11 Luis Aparicio; 14 Ken Boyer; 4 Ron Hansen; 18 Gail Hopkins; 29 Bobby Knoop; 24,6 Tommy McCraw; 14 Bill Melton; 2 Rich Morales; 22 Bob Spence; 8 Pete Ward	Outfielders: 16 Ken Berry; 19 Buddy Bradford; 1 Ángel Bravo; 15 Bob Christian; 9 Woodie Held; 17 Carlos May; 23 José Ortiz; 3 Walt Williams	Manager: 39 Don Gutteridge; 10 Al López; Coaches: 37 Ray Berres; 33 Tony Cuccinello; 34 Kerby Farrell; 39 Don Gutteridge; 35 Les Moss

== Player stats ==
=== Batting ===
Note: G = Games played; AB = At bats; R = Runs scored; H = Hits; 2B = Doubles; 3B = Triples; HR = Home runs; RBI = Runs batted in; BB = Base on balls; SO = Strikeouts; AVG = Batting average; SB = Stolen bases

Player	G	AB	R	H	2B	3B	HR	RBI	BB	SO	AVG	SB
Doug Adams, C	8	14	1	3	0	0	0	1	1	3	.214	0
Sandy Alomar Sr., 2B	22	58	8	13	2	0	0	4	4	6	.224	2
Luis Aparicio, SS	156	599	77	168	24	5	5	51	66	29	.280	24
Ken Berry, CF	130	297	25	69	12	2	4	18	24	50	.232	1
Buddy Bradford, RF, CF	93	273	36	70	8	2	11	27	34	75	.256	5
Ángel Bravo, CF	27	90	10	26	4	2	1	3	3	5	.289	2
Chuck Brinkman, C	14	15	2	1	0	0	0	0	1	5	.067	0
Bob Christian, LF	39	129	11	28	4	0	3	16	10	19	.217	3
Ron Hansen, 2B, 1B, 3B, SS	85	185	15	48	6	1	2	22	18	25	.259	2
Woodie Held, OF, 3B	56	63	9	9	2	0	3	6	13	19	.143	0
Ed Herrmann, C	102	290	31	67	8	0	8	31	30	35	.231	0
Gail Hopkins, 1B	124	373	52	99	13	3	8	46	50	28	.265	2
Duane Josephson, C	52	162	19	39	6	2	1	20	13	17	.241	0
Bobby Knoop, 2B	104	345	34	79	14	1	6	41	35	68	.229	2
Carlos May, LF, RF	100	367	62	103	18	2	18	62	58	66	.281	1
Bill Melton, 3B, RF, LF	157	556	67	142	26	2	23	87	56	106	.255	1
Tommy McCraw, 1B, OF	93	240	21	62	12	2	2	25	21	24	.258	1
Rich Morales, 2B, SS	55	121	12	26	0	1	0	6	7	18	.215	1
José Ortiz, OF	16	11	0	3	1	0	0	2	1	0	.273	0
Don Pavletich, C, 1B	78	188	26	46	12	0	6	33	28	45	.245	0
Bob Spence, 1B	12	26	0	4	1	0	0	3	0	9	.154	0
Pete Ward, 1B, 3B, RF, LF	105	199	22	49	7	0	6	32	33	38	.246	0
Walt Williams, RF, LF	135	471	59	143	22	1	3	32	26	33	.304	6

Player	G	AB	R	H	2B	3B	HR	RBI	BB	SO	AVG	SB
Gary Bell, P	23	5	0	0	0	0	0	0	1	2	.000	0
Cisco Carlos, P	25	10	0	0	0	0	0	0	1	4	.000	0
Paul Edmondson, P	14	29	3	5	0	0	0	1	0	8	.172	0
Sammy Ellis, P	10	6	0	1	0	0	0	0	1	3	.167	0
Joe Horlen, P	36	77	4	14	1	0	0	5	0	22	.182	0
Tommy John, P	33	79	6	9	2	0	0	1	7	27	.114	0
Bart Johnson, P	4	6	1	1	0	0	0	1	2	1	.167	1
Danny Lazar, P	9	4	0	0	0	0	0	0	0	3	.000	0
Bob Locker, P	17	1	0	0	0	0	0	0	0	1	.000	0
Danny Murphy, P	17	1	0	0	0	0	0	0	2	0	.000	0
Jerry Nyman, P	21	20	1	1	1	0	0	3	1	15	.050	0
Dan Osinski, P	51	3	0	0	0	0	0	0	0	2	.000	0
Gary Peters, P	37	71	9	12	4	0	2	4	2	15	.169	0
Fred Rath Sr., P	3	3	0	0	0	0	0	0	0	0	.000	0
Don Secrist, P	19	7	1	1	0	0	0	0	1	4	.143	0
Wilbur Wood, P	76	15	0	0	0	0	0	3	0	8	.000	0
Billy Wynne, P	20	41	1	5	0	1	0	2	2	6	.122	0
Team totals	162	5450	625	1346	210	27	112	585	552	844	.247	54

=== Pitching ===
Note: W = Wins; L = Losses; ERA = Earned run average; G = Games pitched; GS = Games started; SV = Saves; IP = Innings pitched; H = Hits allowed; R = Runs allowed; ER = Earned runs allowed; HR = Home runs allowed; BB = Walks allowed; K = Strikeouts

Player	W	L	ERA	G	GS	SV	IP	H	R	ER	HR	BB	K
Gary Bell	0	0	6.28	23	2	0	38.2	48	27	27	8	25	26
Cisco Carlos	4	3	5.66	25	4	0	49.1	52	33	31	4	26	28
Paul Edmondson	1	6	3.70	14	13	0	87.2	72	36	36	5	43	46
Sammy Ellis	0	3	5.83	10	5	0	29.1	42	20	19	6	18	15
Jack Hamilton	0	3	11.68	8	0	0	12.1	23	16	16	1	10	5
Joe Horlen	13	16	3.78	36	35	0	235.2	237	105	99	20	87	121
Tommy John	9	11	3.25	33	33	0	232.1	230	91	84	16	100	128
Bart Johnson	1	3	3.22	4	3	0	22.1	22	11	8	2	6	18
Danny Lazar	0	0	6.53	9	3	0	20.2	21	15	15	5	13	9
Bob Locker	2	3	6.55	17	0	4	22.0	28	18	16	6	7	15
Danny Murphy	2	1	2.01	17	0	4	31.1	28	8	7	2	10	16
Jerry Nyman	4	4	5.29	20	10	0	64.2	58	40	38	7	40	40
Denny O'Toole	0	0	6.75	2	0	0	4.0	5	3	3	0	2	4
Dan Osinski	5	5	3.56	51	0	2	60.2	56	28	24	3	28	27
Gary Peters	10	15	4.53	36	32	0	218.2	238	118	110	21	79	140
Bob Priddy	0	0	4.50	4	0	0	8.0	10	5	4	2	2	5
Fred Rath Sr.	0	2	7.71	3	2	0	11.2	11	10	10	4	9	4
Don Secrist	0	1	6.08	19	0	0	40.0	35	28	27	7	16	23
Wilbur Wood	10	11	3.01	76	0	15	119.2	113	48	40	13	55	73
Billy Wynne	7	7	4.06	20	20	0	128.2	143	63	58	14	58	67
Team totals	68	94	4.21	162	162	25	1437.2	1470	723	672	146	634	810

== Farm system ==
Level	Team	League	Manager
AAA	Tucson Toros	Pacific Coast League	Bill Adair
AA	Columbus White Sox	Southern League	Gary Johnson
A	Lynchburg White Sox	Carolina League	Stan Wasiak
A	Appleton Foxes	Midwest League	Tom Saffell
A-Short Season	Duluth–Superior Dukes	Northern League	Pel Austin
Rookie	GCL White Sox	Gulf Coast League	Bruce Andrew

LEAGUE CHAMPIONS: Appleton, Duluth-Superior
