= Víctor Bojórquez =

Mexican baseball player and manager (born 1975)

- Outfielder / Manager / Coach
- Born: 31 January 1975 (age 51); Los Mochis, Sinaloa, Mexico
- Bats: Right Throws: Right
Medals
Men's baseball
Representing Mexico
Central American and Caribbean Games
Bronze medal – third place	2006 Cartagena	Team

Víctor Manuel Bojórquez Ruiz (born 31 January 1975), nicknamed "Flamingo", is a Mexican professional baseball coach and manager and former outfielder.

As a player, Bojórquez spent his entire professional in Mexico, playing primarily for the Diablos Rojos del México in the Mexican League (LMB) and the Cañeros de Los Mochis in the Mexican Pacific League (LMP). Since his retirement, he has worked with the Diablos Rojos del México primarily as a coach, while also serving as manager in two separate stints.

== Early life ==
Bojórquez was born on 31 January 1975 in Los Mochis, Sinaloa and grew in the nearby village of San Miguel Zapotitlán. From a young age, he was a fan of the local team, the Cañeros de Los Mochis of the Mexican Pacific League, and listened to every one of their games on the radio at night until they were over. His brothers also played amateur baseball at the local level, and his uncle, Miguel Ángel Ruiz, was a professional baseball player who competed in both the Mexican League and the Mexican Pacific League from 1973 to 1979.

In 1996, following a recommendation from Diablos Rojos del México shortstop José Luis Sandoval, a fellow native of Los Mochis who had seen him play in an amateur league in Sinaloa, Diablos scout José Peña signed Bojórquez for the organization.

== Playing career ==
=== Mexican League ===
"I was a very slender player. At the hotel there were some flamingos and one of my teammates grabbed one to play a prank on me. (Later) We won that game. I recorded the 27th out with a throw to third base. Then we beat Tigres in the final. That’s how the nickname "Flamingo" was born, and I’m grateful to my teammates because people got to know me more through that."

— Bojórquez on the origin of his nickname

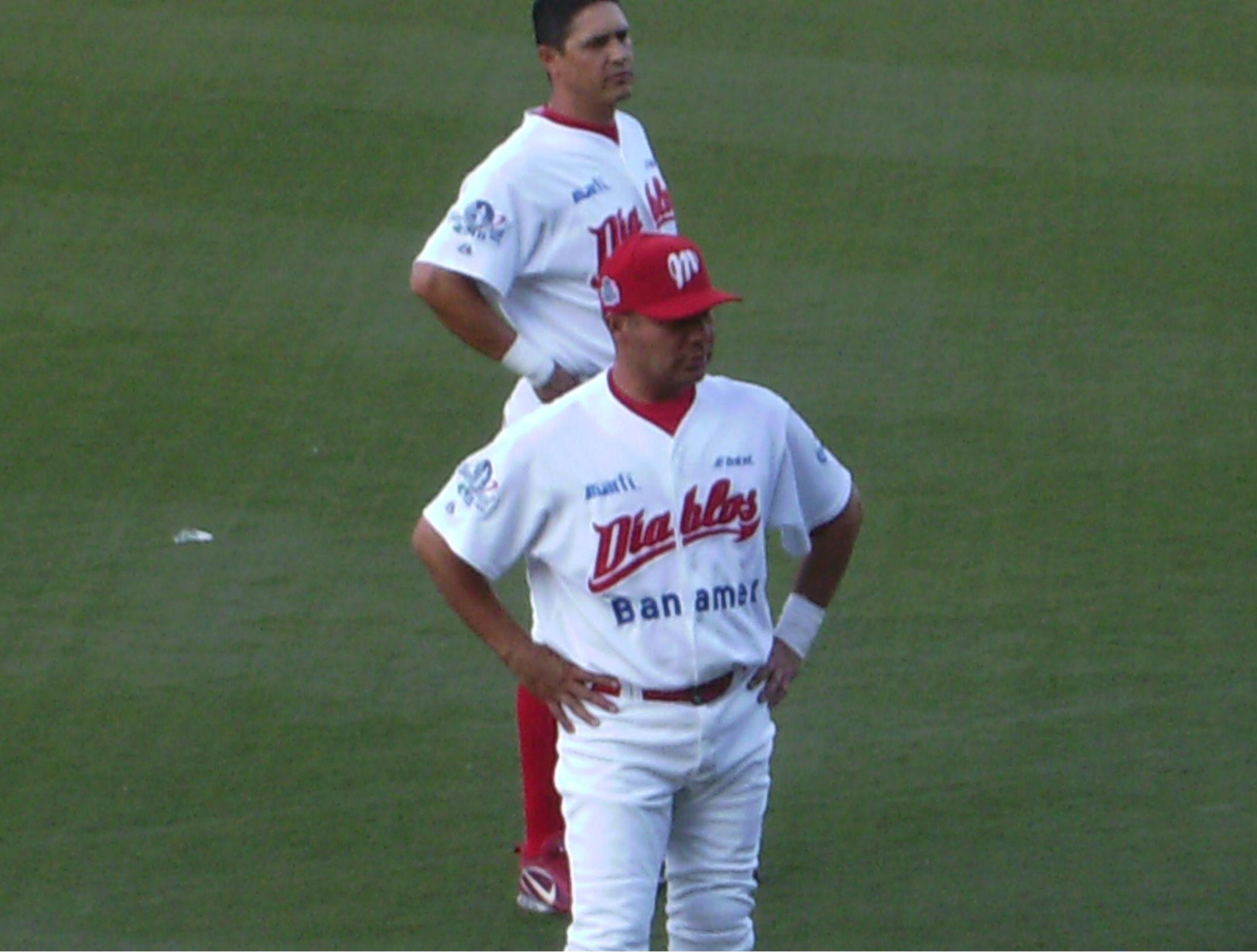
Bojórquez (background) and José Luis Sandoval in 2008

Bojórquez made his Mexican League debut in 1996 with the Diablos Rojos del México. During his debut season, he made 38 appearances and recorded 16 runs, 10 hits, two triples, one home run and seven RBIs with a .471 batting average.

In 1997, he appeared in 56 games, recording 15 runs, 13 hits, one double and two RBIs over 61 at bats, with a .213 batting average. The following season, he was traded to the Broncos de Reynosa, where he became a starter for the team, appearing in 110 games and posting a .301 batting average with 53 runs, 123 hits, 24 doubles, seven triples and 33 RBIs in 409 at bats. In 1999, he returned to the Diablos Rojos del México.

Bojórquez earned his nickname, “Flamingo,” during the 1999 Mexican League playoffs. While the team was on the road in Saltillo for the semifinals, some of his teammates grabbed a flamingo at the hotel where the team was staying and played a prank on him. The Diablos went on to defeat the Saraperos de Saltillo in the semifinals and advance to the finals, which they won against the Tigres de México. Bojórquez became an important player for the team and the nickname “Flamingo” quickly stuck.

In 2011, he saw limited playing time due to arm surgery, which was one of the factors that led to his decision to retire. He retired after the 2012 season, during which he also served as a coach for the team. He finished his Mexican League career with 1,439 appearances, 814 runs scored, 1,569 hits, 110 home runs, 736 RBIs and a .310 batting average.

Mexican League career statistics
Seasons	G	AB	R	H	2B	3B	HR	RBI	SB	BB	BA	SLG
17	1439	5069	814	1569	286	68	110	736	71	231	.310	.464

=== Mexican Pacific League ===
Bojórquez spent thirteen seasons playing in the Mexican Pacific League (LMP), beginning in 1996. He made his debut with his hometown team, the Cañeros de Los Mochis and played every season with the club except for his final LMP season (2009–10), which he spent with the Tomateros de Culiacán. He won the LMP championship with the Cañeros in 2003.

Mexican Pacific League career statistics
Seasons	G	AB	R	H	2B	3B	HR	RBI	SB	BB	BA	SLG
13	584	1700	203	443	56	6	46	176	17	71	.261	.382

== Coaching career ==
After retiring at the end of the 2012 season, Bojórquez stayed with the Diablos Rojos del México as coach and he was appointed third base coach under manager Miguel Ojeda ahead of the 2013 season, a position he held through 2015.

In January 2016, Bojórquez was appointed manager of the Marineros de Ensenada, a minor league affiliate of the Diablos Rojos del México playing in the Liga Norte de México (LNM). He was re-signed for the 2017 season, during which he led the team to the LNM championship, defeating the Algodoneros de San Luis in the final series.

On 5 October 2017, Bojórquez was announced as manager of the Diablos Rojos del México ahead of the 2018 season. The 2018 season was contested in a two-tournament format. In the first tournament, the team finished second in the South Zone with a 36–19 record, but was eliminated in the first round of the postseason, losing to the Tigres de Quintana Roo. In the second tournament, the Diablos again finished second in the South and were eliminated in the South Zone Championship Series by the Guerreros de Oaxaca.

On 3 December 2018, Bojórquez was appointed as the manager of the Cañeros de Los Mochis of the Mexican Pacific League, replacing Ramón Orantes.

Bojórquez continued as manager of the Diablos Rojos for the 2019 season, during which the team finished first in the South Zone with a 67–49 record. In the postseason, the Diablos again lost the Championship Series, this time to the Leones de Yucatán. In December 2019, Sergio Omar Gastélum was presented as the Diablos' manager ahead of the 2020 season, replacing Bojórquez.

On 7 May 2023, Bojórquez, who had been serving as the team’s bench coach, was promoted to manager of the Diablos Rojos, replacing Juan Gabriel Castro, who was dismissed following a 0–9 loss to the Generales de Durango and a 6–9 record. Although initially named interim manager, he was ratified on 18 June 2023 and remained in charge for the rest of the season, leading the Diablos to first place in the South Zone. The team, however, was eliminated in the second round of the playoffs by the Pericos de Puebla. He was replaced by Lorenzo Bundy in November 2023 and reassigned as coach.

On 25 July 2026, he was announced as the manager for the squad that will represent Mexico at the 2026 Central American and Caribbean Games in Santo Domingo, Dominican Republic.

== Managerial statistics ==
=== Mexican League ===
Year	Team	Regular season						Postseason			
Year	Team	Games	Won	Lost	Tied	Pct.	Finish	Won	Lost	Pct.	Notes
2018^{[a]}	Diablos Rojos del México	55	36	19	0	.655	2nd	1	4	.200	Lost First round (Tigres)
2018^{[a]}	Diablos Rojos del México	56	31	24	1	.563	2nd	6	5	.545	Lost Championship Series (Oaxaca)
2019	Diablos Rojos del México	116	67	49	0	.578	1st	0	4	.000	Lost Championship Series (Yucatán)
2023	Diablos Rojos del México	73	49	23	1	.678	1st	2	4	.333	Lost Zone Series (Puebla)
Total		300	183	115	2	.613		10	17	.370	

== Notes ==
- ^{a} The 2018 season was contested in a two-tournament format known as Spring and Autumn.
