= Marvin Williams (baseball) =

American baseball player (1920–2000)

- Second baseman
- Born: February 12, 1920; Houston, Texas, U.S.
- Died: December 23, 2000 (aged 80); Conroe, Texas, U.S.
- Batted: Right Threw: Right

debut
- 1943, for the Philadelphia Stars

Last appearance
- 1961, for the Victoria Rosebuds

Teams
- Negro leagues: Cleveland Buckeyes (1950); Philadelphia Stars (1943–1945); Minor League: Ardmore Rosebuds (1961); Columbia Gems (1955); Dorados de Chihuahua (1952); Laredo Apaches (1953); Rio Grande Valley Giants (1961); Sacramento Solons (1950); San Antonio Missions (1960); Seattle Rainiers (1955); Tulsa Oilers (1956–1958); Vancouver Capilanos (1954); Victoria Rosebuds (1959–1961); Mexican League: Diablos Rojos del México (1948; 1953; 1959); Charros de Jalisco (1949); Tigres del México (1959); Mexican Pacific League: Mayos de Navojoa (1953–1955); Cuban Winter League: Leones de la Habana (1947); Puerto Rican League: Leones de Ponce (1946; 1949); Venezuelan Winter League: Pastora BBC (1946); Sabios de Vargas (1946–1947); Winter International League: Vancouver Capilanos (1954)

Career highlights and awards
- 1944 : East–West All-Star Game; 1954 : Mexican Pacific League MVP; 1956 : Texas League MVP

Marvin Williams (February 12, 1920 – December 23, 2000) was an American professional baseball second baseman. Listed at 6' 0" (1.83 m), 190 lb. (86 kg), Williams batted and threw right handed. He was born in Houston, Texas.

Even though he never made it to the majors, Williams accomplished a 19-year professional baseball career, beginning in 1943 in the Negro leagues, as his nomadic career took him to perform in Canada, Cuba, Mexico, Puerto Rico and Venezuela, before landing back in the United States to play on Minor League Baseball teams until his retirement in 1961. Among his most important achievements, Williams won two batting crowns, two home runs titles, and two Most Valuable Player awards. Moreover, Williams often ranked among the top 10 players in homers, doubles, runs batted in and runs scored throughout his career.

== Early life ==
Williams grew up in Houston and began playing semi-pro ball on sawmill towns of Texas such as Baytown and Conroe. In 1943, a group of players from local teams were selected to play on a barnstorming team that toured to various locations, usually small towns, to stage exhibition matches.. During the tour, Williams impressed a Negro league scout that offered him a contract to play in the league.

== Career ==
Tex, as he was dubbed by his teammates, debuted with the Philadelphia Stars club, playing for them from 1943 through 1945. In these three seasons, he recorded batting averages of .394, .365 and .325, respectively, while posting a slashing line of .363/.381/.538 overall in 248 games. In 1944, he was selected to play on the Negro leagues East squad at the East–West All-Star Game.

Following his Negro league days, Williams was invited to Fenway Park for a Boston Red Sox tryout in 1945, on the recommendation of black sportswriter Wendell Smith. Invited with Williams were Sam Jethroe and Jackie Robinson, but none of them were offered a contract. It has been written that this was only a token tryout, because at the time, the Red Sox had no plans to integrate their roster, according to press sources. Afterwards, Williams landed in the summer Mexican League and slashed .362/.410/.633 with the Diablos Rojos del México.

In between, Williams played winter ball with the Sabios de Vargas club of the Venezuelan Professional Baseball League in 1946 and 1947. In 1946, Williams hit .329, led the league both in RBI (41) and runs (29), while setting a record with eight RBI in a single game after going 4-for-4 with two homers and two singles against Navegantes del Magallanes (March 7, 1946). This record would be matched by Leones del Caracas outfielder Jason Lane against the Águilas del Zulia 15 years later (December 6, 2001). He also played in Puerto Rico for the Leones de Ponce in two seasons between 1944 and 1949, and for the Pastora BBC in Venezuela in 1946.

At the end of 1947, Williams played briefly in the Cuban League with the Leones del Habana club, batting .286 (12-for-42) with four RBI in 10 games.

Williams returned to the Mexican League in 1948 and hit .328 with 14 home runs and 57 RBI for the Rojos, while also leading the league with 11 triples. Besides the Rojos, Williams played for the Charros de Jalisco and Tigres del México combined in all or parts of six seasons spanning 1945–1959. He then spent four winters in Mexico, playing from 1948 through 1951 with the Cañeros de Los Mochis of the Mexican Pacific League.

In his debut with Los Mochis, Williams gained notoriety when he belted the first home run ever hit in the legendary Emilio Ibarra Almada Stadium. Also in that season, he set a league record with 17 home runs in 60 games. That record was surpassed by Dick Hall two seasons later, when he hit 20 homers for the Venados de Mazatlán, although Hall did it in an 80-game season.

Williams came back to the United States in 1950, as he divided playing time at Triple A ball for the Sacramento Solons of the Pacific League as well as for the Cleveland Buckeyes during the Negro league's waning days. His most productive season came in 1952, when he hit .401 with 45 homers and 131 RBI for the Chihuahua Dorados of the Arizona–Texas League, leading the league in batting, home runs and slugging average (.854), and compiling more walks (117) than strikeouts (34) over 117 games. In addition, he was named the interim manager of the team during the midseason, becoming one of the first black managers in Minor League history, joining Sam Bankhead (1951 Farnham Pirates) and Chet Brewer (1952 Porterville Comets).

While at Canada, Williams enjoyed another good season with the Vancouver Capilanos in 1954, leading the Western International League with a .360 average and 274 total bases, while ending second in home runs (20), hits (160) and doubles (34) and third in slugging (.601), He later split 1955 between the Columbia Gems of the South Atlantic League and the Seattle Rainiers of the Pacific Coast League, hitting a combined .303 average with 21 home runs and 106 RBI in 132 games between the two stops. That winter, he returned to Mexico and played for the Mayos de Navojoa, hitting for them .347 with 11 home runs and 51 RBI, including a hitting for the cycle game, to earn MVP Award honors.

Afterwards, Williams played from 1956 through 1958 for the Tulsa Oilers of the Texas League, where he averaged an overall of .291, 18 homers and 92 RBI in these three seasons. In 1956, he ranked among the best ten in the league with a .322 batting average (6th), 26 homers (7th), 111 RBI (4th), 102 runs (6th), 36 doubles (4th), 172 hits (10th), .565 SLG (6th), .394 OBP (10th) and .956 OPS (6th), en route to his second MVP Award. Notably, Williams competed with future big leaguers Don Demeter, Jim Gentile, Albie Pearson, Les Peden and Brooks Robinson.

In 1959, Williams came back to the Texas League with the Victoria Rosebuds where he was used strictly as a pinch hitter, going 2-for-5 in just five games. From there, he returned one last time to the Mexican League and divided his playing time between the Diablos Rojos and Tigres for the rest of year. In 109 games, Williams hit a combined .310/.424/.587 with 29 homers and a league-leading 109 RBI while tying for the most home runs.

For the last time in his native Texas, Williams played for the Rosebuds, Rio Grande Valley Giants and San Antonio Missions in a span of two seasons from 1960 to 1961. Overall, he posted a 279 average with 17 home runs in 1960, and hit 277 with 10 homers and 71 RBI in 1961 before ending his Organized Baseball career at age 41.

== Personal life ==
After retirement, Williams worked at Sears Roebuck for 20 years, the first ten at Virginia and the rest after being transferred to Conroe. In his spare time he coached Little League Baseball teams. Williams was the father of two boys, Marvin Jr. and Billy, from his marriage with Gloria Pacheco, of Mexican origin. Williams passed largely unnoticed in Conroe, where he and his family lived quietly much of their life. He died in 2000 at the age of 80.
