= 2021–22 Mexican Pacific League season =

- League: Mexican Pacific League
- Sport: Baseball
- Duration: 5 October 2021 – 22 January 2022
- Number of teams: 10

Serie Final
- Champions: Charros de Jalisco
- Runners-up: Tomateros de Culiacán

LMP seasons
- ← 2020–21 2022–23 →

The 2021–22 Mexican Pacific League season was the 76th season in the history of the Mexican Pacific League. There were 10 teams that competed. The season started on 5 October 2021 with a game between the defending champions Tomateros de Culiacán and Venados de Mazatlán. The season ended on 22 January 2022 with the last game of the Serie Final, where Charros de Jalisco defeated Tomateros de Culiacán to win the championship.

The champion earned the right to represent Mexico in the 2022 Caribbean Series in Santo Domingo, Dominican Republic.

Due to the COVID-19 pandemic, stadiums in Sonora (home to the Mayos, Naranjeros and Yaquis) only allowed attendance up to 60 percent of the stadiums' capacity; whereas the government of Sinaloa (home to the Algodoneros, Cañeros, Tomateros and Venados) allowed 30 to 50 percent of attendance in the stadiums.

== Standings ==
Regular season standings
Rank	Team	W	L	Pct.	GB	Pts.
1	Mayos de Navojoa	40	28	.588	–	18.0
2	Naranjeros de Hermosillo	36	32	.529	4.0	14.5
3	Algodoneros de Guasave	37	31	.544	3.0	14.0
4	Charros de Jalisco	36	31	.537	3.5	14.0
5	Águilas de Mexicali	36	32	.529	4.0	14.0
6	Yaquis de Obregón	36	32	.529	4.0	12.5
7	Sultanes de Monterrey	33	34	.493	6.5	12.0
8	Tomateros de Culiacán	33	35	.485	7.0	10.5
9	Venados de Mazatlán	29	39	.426	11.0	8.5
10	Cañeros de Los Mochis	23	45	.338	17.0	7.0

== Postseason ==
First round
4	Charros de Jalisco	4
5	Águilas de Mexicali	2
2	Naranjeros de Hermosillo	3
7	Sultanes de Monterrey	4
3	Algodoneros de Guasave	4
6	Yaquis de Obregón	1
1	Mayos de Navojoa	0
8	Tomateros de Culiacán	4

Semifinals
4	Charros de Jalisco	4
7	Sultanes de Monterrey	3
3	Algodoneros de Guasave	2
8	Tomateros de Culiacán	4

Finals
4	Charros de Jalisco	4
8	Tomateros de Culiacán	3

== League leaders ==
Batting leaders
Stat	Player	Team	Total
AVG	(Mexico) Tirso Ornelas	Mayos de Navojoa	.353
HR	(United States) Kyle Martin	Mayos de Navojoa	17
RBI	(Mexico) Joey Meneses	Tomateros de Culiacán	47
R	(Mexico) José Cardona	Naranjeros de Hermosillo	52
H	(Mexico) Ramón Ríos	Venados de Mazatlán	88
SB	(Cuba) Dairon Blanco	Tomateros de Culiacán	21
SLG	(Mexico) Saúl Soto	Cañeros de Los Mochis	.778

Pitching leaders
Stat	Player	Team	Total
ERA	(Cuba) Elián Leyva	Naranjeros de Hermosillo	1.54
W	(Cuba) Elián Leyva	Naranjeros de Hermosillo	7
SV	(Mexico) Jake Sanchez	Águilas de Mexicali	26
IP	(Mexico) Ryan Verdugo	Naranjeros de Hermosillo	82.1
K	(Mexico) Octavio Acosta	Mayos de Navojoa	69
WHIP	(Cuba) Elián Leyva	Naranjeros de Hermosillo	0.99

== Awards ==
LMP Awards
Award	Player	Team	Ref.
Most Valuable Player	(Mexico) Jake Sanchez	Águilas de Mexicali	
Rookie of the Year	(Mexico) Tirso Ornelas	Mayos de Navojoa	
Best Pitcher	(Cuba) Elián Leyva	Naranjeros de Hermosillo	
Best Relief Pitcher	(Mexico) Jake Sanchez	Águilas de Mexicali	
Manager of the Year	(Mexico) Matías Carrillo	Mayos de Navojoa	
