= Alonso Téllez =

Mexican baseball player & coach (born 1960)

- Outfielder / Coach
- Born: 9 September 1960 (age 65); Nuevo Casas Grandes, Chihuahua, Mexico
- Bats: Right Throws: Right
- Stats at Baseball Reference

Member of the Mexican Professional

Baseball Hall of Fame
- Induction: 2010

Gabriel Alonso Téllez Jurado (born 9 September 1960) is a Mexican former professional baseball outfielder and current coach. Téllez spent 20 seasons playing in the Mexican League and 19 seasons in the Mexican Pacific League. He also played in the minor leagues in the Los Angeles Dodgers and Montreal Expos farm systems. He was enshrined into the Mexican Professional Baseball Hall of Fame in 2010.

== Early career ==
Téllez was born on 9 September 1960 in Nuevo Casas Grandes, Chihuahua. When he was 15 years old, he participated in a tryout for the Dorados de Chihuahua; he stayed with the team, making his debut in 1978, aged 17, with the Dorados' farm team Gustavo Díaz Ordaz of the Mexican Central League.

== Professional career ==
The next year, in 1979, Téllez made his Mexican League debut, splitting the season between the Dorados de Chihuahua and the Sultanes de Monterrey. The 1980 Mexican baseball players' strike prompted the interruption of the 1980 Mexican League season. A new league, named the Liga Nacional (National League), organized by the Asociación Nacional de Beisbolistas (National Baseball Players' Association) or ANABE began play in 1981. Téllez played in the Liga Nacional until 1984; in 1985, he was signed by the Cafeteros de Córdoba.

In 1986, Téllez was signed by the Los Angeles Dodgers and spent the 1986 season playing with the Albuquerque Dukes of the Triple-A Pacific Coast League and the San Antonio Dodgers of the Double-A Texas League. In 1987 he played for the San Antonio Dodgers. In 1988 he returned to the Mexican League to play with the Diablos Rojos del México. In 1989 he played for the Jacksonville Expos, the AA Montreal Expos farm team.

He returned to Mexico in 1989, signed by the Industriales de Monterrey, where he would play for most of his career. At the end of the 1994 season, the Industriales were relocated to Reynosa, Tamaulipas and played the 1995 season as Broncos de Reynosa; Téllez stayed with the franchise, where he would play until 2002. Halfway through the 2002 season, he was transferred to the Leones de Yucatán. In 2004, during his last profession season, he played for three teams: Acereros de Monclova, Vaqueros Laguna and Rieleros de Aguascalientes.

Téllez played a total of twenty seasons in the Mexican League and compiled a total of 1132 runs, 2522 hits, 448 doubles, 226 home runs, 1289 runs batted in and a batting average of .309, including twelve consecutive seasons hitting over .300.

He also played nineteen seasons in the Mexican Pacific League (LMP) for the Algodoneros de Guasave, Ostioneros de Guaymas, Águilas de Mexicali, Naranjeros de Hermosillo, Cañeros de Los Mochis and Yaquis de Obregón. His total career stats in the LMP are: 502 runs, 1056 hits, 176 doubles, 38 triples, 94 home runs and 520 runs batted in.

In 2010 Téllez was inducted into the Mexican Professional Baseball Hall of Fame alongside Derek Bryant, Armando Reynoso, Héctor Heredia and umpire Efraín Ibarra; Téllez obtained the most votes with 186.

== Coaching career ==
After his retirement as player, Téllez has worked as coach for the Leones de Yucatán, Broncos de Reynosa, Piratas de Campeche, Generales de Durango and Toros de Tijuana of the Mexican League and Águilas de Mexicali and Naranjeros de Hermosillo of the Mexican Pacific League.

In 2013 he won the Liga Norte de México championship with the Algodoneros de San Luis as the team's manager. He was interim manager of the Olmecas de Tabasco during the 2014 season, replacing Enrique Reyes.
