= 2022–23 Mexican Pacific League season =

- League: Mexican Pacific League
- Sport: Baseball
- Duration: 11 October 2022 – 28 January 2023
- Number of games: 213
- Number of teams: 10
- Season champions: Cañeros de Los Mochis

LMP seasons
- ← 2021–22 2023–24 →

The 2022–23 Mexican Pacific League season was the 65th season in the history of the Mexican Pacific League (LMP). It was contested by ten teams. Cañeros de Los Mochis won their fourth championship by defeating Algodoneros de Guasave 4–2 in the final series, led by manager José Moreno.

== Standings ==
Regular season standings
Rank	Team	W	L	Pct.	GB	Pts.
1	Naranjeros de Hermosillo	43	25	.632	—	19
2	Cañeros de Los Mochis	41	27	.603	2.0	17
3	Yaquis de Obregón	38	30	.559	5.0	16
4	Algodoneros de Guasave	36	32	.529	7.0	15
5	Sultanes de Monterrey	32	36	.471	11.0	11.5
6	Águilas de Mexicali	31	37	.456	12.0	10.5
7	Mayos de Navojoa	31	37	.456	12.0	10.5
8	Venados de Mazatlán	33	35	.485	10.0	10
9	Charros de Jalisco	29	39	.426	14.0	8.5
10	Tomateros de Culiacán	26	42	.382	17.0	7

== Postseason ==
First round
2	Los Mochis	4
7	Navojoa	1
3	Obregón	4
6	Mexicali	3
1	Hermosillo	4
8	Mazatlán	2
4	Guasave	4
5	Monterrey	3

Semifinals
2	Los Mochis	4
3	Obregón	2
1	Hermosillo	2
4	Guasave	4

Finals
2	Los Mochis	4
4	Guasave	2

== League leaders ==
Batting leaders
Stat	Player	Team	Total
AVG	(Mexico) Roberto Valenzuela	Sultanes de Monterrey	.365
HR	(Mexico) Jesse Castillo	Algodoneros de Guasave	10
HR	(United States) Anthony Giansanti	Águilas de Mexicali	10
HR	(Cuba) Yasmany Tomás	Cañeros de Los Mochis	10
RBI	(Cuba) Yasmany Tomás	Cañeros de Los Mochis	57
R	(Mexico) Isaac Rodríguez	Cañeros de Los Mochis	40
R	(Mexico) Roberto Valenzuela	Sultanes de Monterrey	40
H	(Mexico) Amadeo Zazueta	Charros de Jalisco	88
SB	(Mexico) José Cardona	Naranjeros de Hermosillo	29
SLG	(Mexico) Christopher Escárrega	Venados de Mazatlán	.556

Pitching leaders
Stat	Player	Team	Total
ERA	(Mexico) Luis Miranda	Cañeros de Los Mochis	1.07
W	(Mexico) Wilmer Ríos	Naranjeros de Hermosillo	9
SV	(Colombia) Elkin Alcalá	Venados de Mazatlán	20
IP	(Mexico) Javier Solano	Charros de Jalisco	92.1
K	(United States) Matt Pobereyko	Algodoneros de Guasave	73
WHIP	(Mexico) Luis Miranda	Cañeros de Los Mochis	0.87

== Awards ==
2022–23 LMP Awards
Award	Player	Team	Ref.
Most Valuable Player	(Cuba) Yasmany Tomás	Cañeros de Los Mochis	
Most Valuable Player	(Mexico) Fernando Villegas	Charros de Jalisco	
Pitcher of the Year	(Mexico) Luis Fernando Miranda	Cañeros de Los Mochis	
Reliever of the Year	(Colombia) Elkin Alcalá	Venados de Mazatlán	
Manager of the Year	(Mexico) Juan Gabriel Castro	Naranjeros de Hermosillo	
