= Hassan Peña =

Cuban baseball player (born 1985)

- Pitcher
- Born: March 25, 1985 (age 40); Havana, Cuba
- Batted: Right Threw: Right

CPBL debut
- March 22, 2016, for the EDA Rhinos

Last CPBL appearance
- April 15, 2016, for the EDA Rhinos

CPBL statistics
- Win–loss record: 0–1
- Earned run average: 12.79
- Strikeouts: 5
- Stats at Baseball Reference

Teams
- EDA Rhinos (2016)

Hassan Peña (born March 25, 1985) is a Cuban professional baseball pitcher for the Algodoneros de San Luis of the Liga Norte de México.

In the Cuban National Series, Pena pitched for the Metropolitanos and the Industriales. He was kept off of the Cuban national baseball team because he had relatives in the United States, and it was feared that he might defect. As a result, he defected in 2005.

== Career ==
=== Washington Nationals ===
After attending Palm Beach Community College, he was selected by the Washington Nationals in the 13th round (391st overall) of the 2006 Major League Baseball draft.

Peña did not play in the Nationals' system in 2006. He spent the 2007 season with the Vermont Lake Monsters in the short-season New York–Penn League. In 13 starts, Peña pitched 59⅓ innings, compiling a win-loss record of 4–5 and an ERA of 4.25. In 2008, he pitched for the Potomac Nationals and Hagerstown Suns, and in 2009, he pitched for the Gulf Coast League Nationals and Hagerstown. In 2010, Peña spent the season with the Double-A Harrisburg Senators. In 2011, he pitched for Harrisburg and Triple-A affiliate Syracuse Chiefs. Peña pitched for Syracuse in 2012 became a free agent after the season.

=== Tigres de Quintana Roo ===
On April 13, 2013, Peña signed with the Tigres de Quintana Roo of the Mexican League. He elected free agency on November 1.

=== Kansas City Royals ===
On February 18, 2014, Peña signed a minor league contract with the Kansas City Royals. He was released by the Royals organization on April 24.

=== Tigres de Quintana Roo (second stint) ===
On July 1, 2014, Peña signed with the Tigres de Quintana Roo of the Mexican League. He was released by Quintana Roo on July 14.

=== Sultanes de Monterrey ===
On July 15, 2014, Peña signed with the Sultanes de Monterrey of the Mexican League. He was released on April 2, 2017.

=== Somerset Patriots ===
On March 31, 2017, Peña signed with the Somerset Patriots of the Atlantic League of Professional Baseball. He was released by the Patriots on May 5.

=== Piratas de Campeche ===
On February 8, 2018, Peña signed with the Piratas de Campeche of the Mexican League. He was released by Campeche on April 2.

=== Olmecas de Tabasco ===
On April 6, 2018, Peña signed with the Olmecas de Tabasco of the Mexican League. He was released by the Olmecas on April 10

=== Third stint with Quintana Roo ===
On July 27, 2018, Peña signed with the Tigres de Quintana Roo of the Mexican League. He became a free agent after the season.

=== Algodoneros de San Luis ===
On March 21, 2019, Peña signed with the Algodoneros de San Luis of the Liga Norte de México.
