= Fred Rath =

Fred Rath may refer to:

- Fred Rath Sr. (born 1943), Major League Baseball pitcher for the Chicago White Sox
- Fred Rath Jr. (born 1973), son of the above, Major League Baseball pitcher for the Colorado Rockies
- Fred J. Rath (1888–1968), American businessman and politician from New York
- Fred Rath (writer) (1874–1954), American writer
