= Tim Johnson (baseball) =

American baseball player and manager

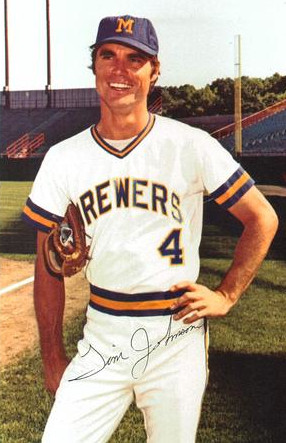
- Johnson in 1973
- Infielder / Manager
- Born: July 22, 1949 (age 77); Grand Forks, North Dakota, U.S.
- Batted: Left Threw: Right

MLB debut
- April 24, 1973, for the Milwaukee Brewers

Last MLB appearance
- September 28, 1979, for the Toronto Blue Jays

MLB statistics
- Batting average: .223
- Home runs: 0
- Runs batted in: 84
- Managerial record: 88–74
- Winning %: .543
- Stats at Baseball Reference

Teams
- As player: Milwaukee Brewers (1973–1978); Toronto Blue Jays (1978–1979); As manager: Toronto Blue Jays (1998); As coach: Montreal Expos (1993–1994); Boston Red Sox (1995–1996)

Timothy Evald Johnson (born July 22, 1949) is an American former professional baseball player and manager. A shortstop and utility infielder in Major League Baseball (MLB) from 1973 to 1979, he became better known as manager of the Toronto Blue Jays.

== Playing career ==
After signing with the Los Angeles Dodgers in 1967 as a free agent, Johnson was traded to the Milwaukee Brewers for Rick Auerbach just as the 1973 season began while still a minor leaguer. Johnson played every day for the 1973 Brewers at shortstop, but lost his starting job next season to Robin Yount, thus forcing him to settle in as a utility infielder. He was traded to the Toronto Blue Jays during the 1978 season where he retired a year later with a lifetime .223 batting average in 516 career games.

== Scouting, coaching and managerial career ==
After retiring as a player, Johnson spent the next 20 years as a scout, coach or minor league manager for the Dodgers, Montreal Expos, Boston Red Sox and Chicago Cubs.

=== 1998 Toronto Blue Jays season ===
The Blue Jays named Johnson as their manager for the 1998 season following the firing of Cito Gaston and the interim management of pitching coach Mel Queen. Johnson beat out several higher-profile candidates, most notably Davey Johnson (no relation), Larry Bowa, and Buck Martinez.

Queen remained on as pitching coach under Johnson and the two reportedly feuded extensively, despite Johnson's reputation as a good communicator. Johnson also had rumoured differences with several of his players, including Pat Hentgen, Ed Sprague, and Cy Young Award winner Roger Clemens.

Despite this lack of chemistry, Johnson guided the 1998 Blue Jays to a respectable third-place finish in the AL East with an 88–74 record, just four games out of a tie for the wild card. It was the team's first winning season since they won two World Series in a row in 1992 and 1993.

=== Vietnam War stories controversy ===
This success was partly attributed to the stories Johnson would tell his players about his battle experiences in the Vietnam War. For example, he told Hentgen a story about his war experiences to get him to accept a different place in the pitching rotation.

However, in late November 1998, Johnson told several Toronto newspapers all of these stories were completely made up. In truth, Johnson had been in the Marine Corps Reserve throughout the war, and trained mortarmen at Camp Pendleton, California, while playing in the Dodgers' farm system. He'd also claimed for over 20 years he had been an All-American high school basketball player, and turned down a scholarship to attend UCLA.

During the 1998 baseball winter meetings, Johnson said admitting the truth was like having "a 50,000 pound weight" taken off his shoulders. He said he had lied because he felt guilty about going to spring training with the Dodgers while many of his friends fought in the war. He entered therapy, and called several of his players to apologize for lying.

==== Departure from the Blue Jays ====
The Blue Jays were initially willing to stand by Johnson and let him return for 1999. During spring training, he apologized to the entire team, and later said that he did not seem to detect a credibility problem. However, the next month brought a steady diet of questions about Johnson's credibility, as well as outside attacks (Sprague, for instance, called Johnson a "liar" and a "backstabber"). Finally, on March 17, less than a month before opening day, Blue Jays general manager Gord Ash fired Johnson and replaced him with Jim Fregosi. Ash said Johnson's presence had become so much of a distraction he felt he would have to fire Johnson "if not now ... 30 or 45 days from now." He decided he had to act in order to save the season. After Johnson's one season at the helm, the Blue Jays failed to achieve an equal or better record than Johnson's 88–74 mark until 2015. It remains Johnson's last job in Major League Baseball.

=== Managerial record ===
Team	Year	Regular season					Postseason			
Team	Year	Games	Won	Lost	Win %	Finish	Won	Lost	Win %	Result
TOR	1998	162	88	74	.543	3rd in AL East	–	–	–	–
Total		162	88	74	.543		0	0	–	

== After MLB ==
Following his dismissal from the Blue Jays, Johnson spent seven seasons as manager in the Mexican League, with the Diablos Rojos del México in 1999-2002, Yaquis de Obregón in 2002-2003 and then with the Águilas de Mexicali in 2004-2005.

In 2003, Johnson became manager of the Lincoln Saltdogs of the Northern League. In 2006, the Lincoln team joined the American Association of Independent Professional Baseball. On September 25, 2008, Johnson resigned after six years. His career record as the Saltdogs' manager was 315–255.

On December 16, 2008, Johnson was announced as the inaugural manager of the Golden Baseball League incarnation of the Tucson Toros.

On November 12, 2010, Johnson was announced as the second manager of the Lake County Fielders of the North American League.

On July 9, 2011, Johnson resigned from his Lake County Fielders Managerial Position

Johnson later became field manager with the El Paso Diablos in 2012, but the team folded in 2013.

Johnson coached in the Arizona Winter League as of 2017 and spent time in the California Winter League from 2010–2014 as an instructor and coach. He also coached the Algodoneros de San Luis of the Liga Norte de Mexico later in 2017, before he was promoted to manager of the Pericos de Puebla of the Mexican League on June 4, 2017, succeeding interim manager Martín Arzate, who had replaced Von Hayes. Taking over about halfway through the season, Johnson led the Pericos to their second straight championship appearance.

Johnson was named manager of the Tigres de Quintana Roo of the Mexican League for the 2018 season.

Johnson was announced as manager for the Piratas de Campeche of the Mexican League for the 2019 season. However, he was fired 33 games into the season on May 13 after a 10-23 start to the season.

He was hired by the Bravos de León of the Mexican League for the 2020 season. The team posted a 29-37 record and did not make the playoffs. Johnson was dismissed by the team following the season.

== Personal ==
Johnson is the brother of long-time MLB executive Sandy Johnson

Preceded by Jim Tracy	Montreal Expos bench coach 1993–1994	Succeeded by Kevin Kennedy
Preceded by Don Zimmer	Boston Red Sox bench coach 1995–1996	Succeeded by Grady Little
