= Dan Firova =

American baseball player (born 1956)

Tecolotes de los Dos Laredos
- Catcher / Coach / Manager
- Born: October 16, 1956 (age 70); Refugio, Texas, U.S.
- Batted: Right Threw: Right

MLB debut
- September 1, 1981, for the Seattle Mariners

Last MLB appearance
- July 28, 1988, for the Cleveland Indians

MLB statistics
- Batting average: .000
- Games played: 17
- At bats: 7
- Stats at Baseball Reference

Teams
- As player: Seattle Mariners (1981–1982); Cleveland Indians (1988); As coach: Washington Nationals (2016–2017); Houston Astros (2021–2023)

Career highlights and awards
- World Series champion (2022)

Daniel Michael Firova (born October 16, 1956) is an American professional baseball catcher and coach who currently serves as the manager of the Tecolotes de los Dos Laredos of the Mexican League. As a player, he caught 17 games: 13 in 1981 and three in 1982 for the Seattle Mariners, and one in 1988 for the Cleveland Indians. In most of those games, he entered late in the game as a defensive replacement. He came to the plate a grand total of seven times with no hits or walks.

== Playing career ==
While Firova was a freshman at Refugio High School, he accidentally cut off the little finger on his throwing hand with a band saw in shop class. Despite this, he earned a two-year baseball scholarship at Bee County College. After that, he played baseball at Pan American College, where he earned his degree, and was subsequently drafted by the Mariners. He spent two seasons in the minor leagues with various teams, made his major league debut for the Mariners on September 1, 1981, and played in 13 games. He also played in two games in 1982, but primarily spent 1981, 1982, and 1983 with the Nuevo Laredo Tecolotes of the Mexican League.

Firova returned to the Mariners organization in 1985, and remained with them through 1987. He signed with the Cleveland Indians in 1988, and played in one major league game for them. He spent 1989 with the Chicago Cubs organization, then played in the Mexican League through 1993.

== Coaching career ==
Firova served as the manager of Vaqueros Laguna in the Mexican League. He began managing in the Mexican League in 1993, and was named that league's Manager of the Year in 2000. As a manager, Firova won 3 Mexican League Championships with the Mexico City Tigres in 1997, 2000 and 2001.

The Washington Nationals announced on December 15, 2015, that Firova would serve as the team's bullpen coach with the team. His contract with Washington expired after the 2017 season.

Firova was announced as the manager for the Acereros de Monclova of the Mexican League for the Spring Tournament of the 2018 season. He was not brought back for the second tournament of the season.

In 2019, Firova returned to Acereros de Monclova as the team's bench coach.

On January 28, 2021, Firova joined the Houston Astros to serve as quality control coach with the major league team. In 2022, the Astros won 106 games, the second-highest total in franchise history. They advanced to the World Series and defeated the Philadelphia Phillies in six games to give Firova his first career World Series title.

On June 7, 2025, Firova was announced as the manager for the Conspiradores de Querétaro of the Mexican League. In July 2025, it was announced that Firova would join the Nicaragua national baseball team at the 2026 World Baseball Classic as part of manager Dusty Baker's coaching staff. On May 24, 2026, Firova was dismissed after a 14–19 start and replaced by the team’s bench coach, Juan Francisco Rodríguez, as interim manager.

On October 23, 2026, Firova was announced as the manager for the Tecolotes de los Dos Laredos of the Mexican League.

Sporting positions
Preceded by Matthew LeCroy	Washington Nationals bullpen coach 2016–2017	Succeeded by Henry Blanco
Preceded by Chris Speier	Houston Astros quality control coach 2021—2023	Succeeded by Jason Bell
