= 2003 Caribbean Series =

2003 baseball tournament

The forty-fifth edition of the Caribbean Series (Serie del Caribe) was held from February 2 through February 8 of 2003 at Roberto Clemente Stadium in Carolina, Puerto Rico. It featured the champion baseball teams of the Dominican Republic, Águilas Cibaeñas; Mexico, Cañeros de Los Mochis, and Puerto Rico, Indios de Mayagüez. This time Venezuela did not participate in the tournament due to a national general strike, being replaced by the second place team from Puerto Rico, the Criollos de Caguas. The format consisted of 12 games, each team facing the other teams twice.

== Final standings ==
| Country | Club | W | L | W/L % | Managers |
|---|---|---|---|---|---|
| Dominican Republic | Águilas Cibaeñas * | 6 | 1 | .857 | Félix Fermín |
| Puerto Rico 1 | Indios de Mayagüez | 5 | 2 | .714 | Nick Leyva |
| Puerto Rico 2 | Criollos de Caguas | 2 | 4 | .333 | Jerry Morales |
| Mexico | Cañeros de Los Mochis | 0 | 6 | .000 | Juan Francisco Rodríguez |
| * Won tie-breaking game for first place |

== Individual leaders ==
| Player | Statistic |
|---|---|---|
Batting
| David Ortiz (DOM) | Batting average | .480 |
| Orlando Merced (PUR 2) | Home runs | 3 |
| David Ortiz (DOM) | RBI | 11 |
Pitching
| Hipólito Pichardo (DOM) | Wins | 2 |
| Kiko Calero (PUR 1) | ERA | 0.00 |

== All-Star team ==
| Name | Position |
|---|---|
| Héctor Ortiz (PUR 2) | Catcher |
| David Ortiz (DOM) | First baseman |
| Rafael Furcal (DOM) | Second baseman |
| Ramón Orantes (MEX) | Third baseman |
| Miguel Tejada (DOM) | Shortstop |
| Luis Polonia (DOM) | Left fielder |
| José Valentín (PUR 1) | Center fielder |
| Orlando Merced (PUR 2) | Right fielder |
| Luis López (PUR 1) | Designated hitter |
| Kiko Calero (PUR 1) | Right-handed pitcher |
| Ángel Miranda (PUR 2) | Left-handed pitcher |
| Hipólito Pichardo (DOM) | Relief pitcher |
Awards
| David Ortiz (DOM) | Most Valuable Player |
| Nick Leyva (PUR 1) | Manager |

== Sources ==
- Bjarkman, Peter. Diamonds around the Globe: The Encyclopedia of International Baseball. Greenwood. ISBN 978-0-313-32268-6
- Serie del Caribe 2003
- Serie del Caribe : History, Records and Statistics (Spanish)
