= 1968–69 Mexican Pacific League season =

- League: Mexican Pacific League
- Sport: Baseball
- Duration: 10 October 1968 – 7 January 1969
- Number of games: 221
- Number of teams: 6
- Season champions: Cañeros de Los Mochis
- Season MVP: (United States) Don Secrist (Los Mochis)

LMP seasons
- ← 1967 1969–70 →

The 1968–69 Mexican Pacific League season was the 11th season in the history of the Mexican Pacific League (LMP). It was contested by six teams. Cañeros de Los Mochis won their first championship in the team's history by finishing first in the final round robin, led by manager Benjamín Valenzuela.

This was the first season of the league to use the points system to determine the standings.

== Standings ==
=== Regular season ===
Regular season standings
Rank	Team	W	L	T	Pct.	GB	Pts.
1	Cañeros de Los Mochis	35	27	0	.565	—	9
2	Yaquis de Obregón	34	26	2	.567	1.0	8
3	Naranjeros de Hermosillo	31	28	3	.525	2.5	7
4	Ostioneros de Guaymas	23	36	2	.390	11.0	7
5	Tomateros de Culiacán	30	30	2	.500	4.0	6
6	Venados de Mazatlán	25	31	5	.446	7.5	5

=== Championship round robin ===
Championship round robin standings
Rank	Team	W	L	T	Pct.	GB
1	Cañeros de Los Mochis	11	6	1	.647	—
2	Yaquis de Obregón	9	9	0	.500	2.5
3	Naranjeros de Hermosillo	8	9	1	.471	3.0
4	Ostioneros de Guaymas	7	11	0	.389	4.5

== League leaders ==
Batting leaders
Stat	Player	Team	Total
AVG	(Mexico) Gabriel Lugo	Cañeros de Los Mochis	.309
HR	(Cuba) Rogelio Álvarez	Tomateros de Culiacán	20
RBI	(United States) Bill Parlier	Yaquis de Obregón	50
R	(Mexico) Gabriel Lugo	Cañeros de Los Mochis	49
H	(Mexico) Gabriel Lugo	Cañeros de Los Mochis	98
SB	(Mexico) Aurelio Rodríguez	Cañeros de Los Mochis	17
SLG	(Cuba) Rogelio Álvarez	Tomateros de Culiacán	.613

Pitching leaders
Stat	Player	Team	Total
ERA	(Mexico) Vicente Romo	Ostioneros de Guaymas	1.54
W	(United States) Don Secrist	Cañeros de Los Mochis	15
L	(Cuba) Ramón López	Yaquis de Obregón	11
SV	(Mexico) Manuel Lugo	Naranjeros de Hermosillo	5
IP	(United States) Don Secrist	Cañeros de Los Mochis	176.0
K	(United States) Jerry Hinsley	Ostioneros de Guaymas	176

== Awards ==
1968–69 LMP Awards
Award	Player	Team
Manager of the Year	(Mexico) Benjamín Valenzuela	Cañeros de Los Mochis
Most Valuable Player	(United States) Don Secrist	Cañeros de Los Mochis
Rookie of the Year	(Mexico) Luis Lagunas	Yaquis de Obregón
