= Marineros de Ensenada =

Mexican pro baseball team

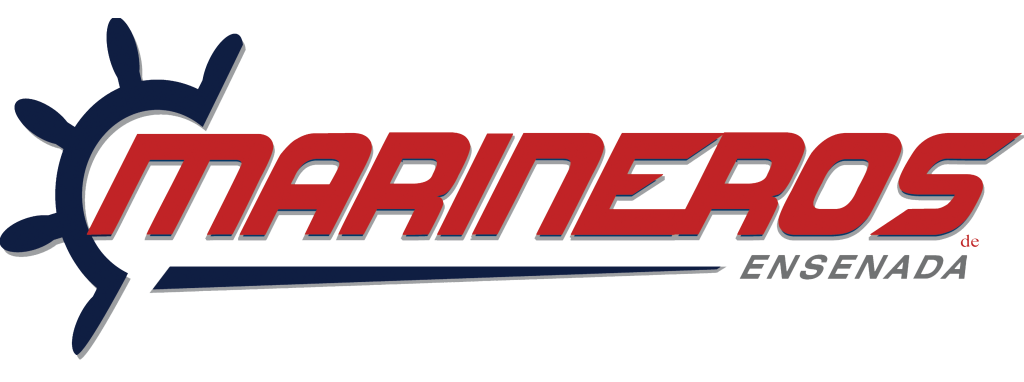
- Logo

Information
- League: Liga Norte de México
- Location: Ensenada, Baja California
- Ballpark: Deportivo Antonio Palacios
- Founded: 2005
- League championships: 5 (2010, 2012, 2017, 2018, 2022)
- Colors: Navy blue, red, gray and white
- President: Juan Manuel Arellano
- Manager: Hernando Arredondo
- Website: www.marinerosdeensenada.com

Current uniforms
Home	Away

The Marineros de Ensenada (Ensenada Mariners) are a Mexican professional baseball based in Ensenada, Baja California. They compete in the Liga Norte de México (LNM), a feeder league for the Mexican League. The Marineros are one of the most successful teams in the league, having won five LNM titles.

The Marineros have acted as minor league affiliates for the Diablos Rojos del México and the Guerreros de Oaxaca since 2010.

== History ==
=== Liga Norte de Sonora (2005–2011) ===
The Marineros de Ensenada were established in 2005 by Juan Manuel Arellano and his wife Gabriela Ledesma as members of the Liga Norte de Sonora (LNS). They were the first team to play in the city since the Delfines de Ensenada, who played three seasons in the LNS and won two championships in 1983 and 1984.

The Marineros reached the playoffs in each of their first two years in the league, but were eliminated by the Rojos de Caborca and the Vaqueros de Agua Prieta, respectively. The team reached the semi-finals in 2007, but were eliminated by the Membrilleros de Magdalena. In 2008, the Marineros reached the LNS championship series, though they lost four games to one to the Vaqueros de Agua Prieta. The following year, they were eliminated in the first round of the playoffs by the Algodoneros de San Luis.

The Marineros won their first championship in 2010 under manager Donald Cañedo after beating the defending champions, the Ostioneros de Guaymas, four games to one. The Marineros secured the title with a 4–0 victory in Game 5, with Agustín Campa being named the LNS Final Series MVP. Other notable players on the team included Naoya Okamoto, Yuji Yoshioka, and Daniel Núñez. In April 2011, the Governor of Baja California, José Guadalupe Osuna Millán, announced that the state government was allocating MXN$500,000 to upgrades to the Marineros' facilities. The Marineros once again reached the championship series in 2011, though they were defeated by the Rojos de Caborca four games to three.

=== Liga Norte de México (2012–present) ===
In January 2012, the Liga Norte de Sonora split into two leagues and the Marineros joined the new Liga Norte de México (LNM). The team would, however, continue their affiliation as a feeder club for the Diablos Rojos del México and the Guerreros de Oaxaca. The owner of the Marineros, Juan Manuel Arellano, also rescued the Cerveceros de Tecate, who had suffered economic and administrative issues, and helped the team return to professional baseball as members of the LNM.

In the inaugural LNM season following the split from the LNS, the Marineros lead the league with 51 regular season wins. The team led the league with 408 runs while pitcher Alexis Candelario led the league in wins (10) and strikeouts (130). Abelardo Beltrán was promoted to the role of manager after seven years as a coach, replacing Roberto Heras. In the semi-finals, the Marineros went down three games to two against the Algodoneros de San Luis, just one loss away from elimination. In Game 6, the Marineros came back from a 12–1 deficit to secure a 13–12 victory. In Game 7, Marineros pitchers Alexis Candelario, Marlon Arias and José Escalona combined to shutout the Algodoneros 7–0. The Marineros then defeated the Tiburones de Puerto Peñasco in six games in the championship series.

The Marineros hired Donald Cañedo, who previously led them to their 2010 title, as manager ahead of the 2013 season. Esteban Loaiza joined the team on rehab assignment from the Diablos Rojos del México and earned the win in their season-opening victory over the Freseros de San Quintín. In his second game, Loaiza faced off against Freseros pitcher, two-time Olympic gold medallist Pedro Luis Lazo. The Marineros were eliminated in the semi-finals by the Algodoneros de San Luis. The Marineros were then swept in the playoffs by the Freseros de San Quintín in consecutive seasons in 2014 and 2015.

Prior to the 2016 season, the Marineros hired former Diablos Rojos del México player Víctor Bojórquez as their manager. That year, they lost to the Toritos de Tecate in six games in the first round of the playoffs. In the 2017 season, the Marineros finished with a league-best 52–31 record and swept the Tiburones de Puerto Peñasco in the semi-finals. They went on to defeat the Algodoneros de San Luis in seven games in the championship series, winning Game 7 by a score of 3–2 after 10 innings en route to their second LNM title – and third title overall. Mariners pitcher Luis Ramírez was named the LNS Final Series MVP after earning three wins.

After winning the 2017 title, the Marineros manager, Víctor Bojórquez, was hired by the Diablos Rojos and took 15 Marineros players with him. In March 2018, the Marineros hired former Diablos Rojos player Sergio Omar Gastélum as his replacement. However, Gastélum left for the Guerreros de Oaxaca midway through the 2018 season and was replaced by Gerónimo Gil in June. Ensenada finished the season with a league-best 58–37 record. In the semi-finals, they beat the Algodoneros de San Luis in seven games. The Marineros went on to win their second consecutive LNM title after defeating the Freseros de San Quintín in six games in the championship series. Yousamot Cota, who batted .378 during the playoffs, was named the Final Series MVP.

The Marineros went 30–30 in 2019 and lost in the semi-finals to the Rojos de Caborca in seven games. The LNM cancelled its 2020 and 2021 seasons due to the COVID-19 pandemic in Mexico. After two years of inactivity, the Marineros hired José Luis Sandoval as their manager ahead of the 2022 season. However, Sandoval was called up by the Diablos Rojos and replaced by Hernando Arredondo in late June. The Marineros opened the 2022 playoffs by beating the Algodoneros de San Luis in six games in the semi-finals. They went on to defeat the Freseros de San Quintín in the championship series, clinching their fifth title with an emphatic 15–7 win in Game 5. Marineros pitchers Vidal Sotelo and Joel Sosa were named co-Final Series MVPs.

== Roster ==
Marineros de Ensenada roster
Players		Coaches
Pitchers: 53 (Mexico) José Frutos; 31 (Mexico) Manuel Hernández; 99 (Dominican Republic) Joel Inoa; 36 (Mexico) Aaron Medina; 34 (Mexico) Jorge Monroy; 3 (Mexico) Adrian del Moral; 23 (Mexico) Víctor Morales; 26 (Mexico) Rubén Navarro; 39 (Mexico) Dulio Ochoa; 37 (Mexico) Pedro Osuna; 30 (Mexico) José Miguel Ramírez; 21 (Mexico) Esteban Rodríguez; 13 (Mexico) Alexis Rico; 12 (Mexico) Mario Sánchez; 18 (Mexico) Joel Sosa; 18 (Mexico) Vidal Sotelo; 32 (Dominican Republic) Santiago Valdez; 17 (Mexico) Geovany Zamudio	Catchers: 7 (Mexico) Brandon Jaime; 10 (Mexico) Heriberto Morales; Infielders: 4 (Mexico) Ichiro Cano; 19 (United States) Pedro Castellano; 33 (Dominican Republic) Randy César; 24 (Mexico) Yousamot Cota; 20 (Mexico) Sebastián García; 2 (Mexico) Pedro Hernández; 14 (Mexico) Cristian Pacheco; 35 (Dominican Republic) Juremi Profar; 27 (Mexico) Raúl Torres; 29 (Dominican Republic) Alexander Valdez; Outfielders: 11 (Mexico) Orlando Arellano; 28 (Mexico) José Ignacio Cervantes; 53 (Mexico) Valentín Hernández; 89 (Cuba) Yordanis Linares; 8 (Mexico) Carlos Pachecho	Manager: 42 (Mexico) Hernando Arredondo; Coaches: 1 (Mexico) Ramón Esquer; 9 (Mexico) Sergio Inzunza; 25 (Dominican Republic) Rafael Roque; Roster updated on 23 May 2023

== Championships ==
Season	Manager	Opponent	Series score	Record
2012	Abelardo Beltrán	Tiburones de Puerto Peñasco	4–2	59–33
2017	Víctor Bojórquez	Algodoneros de San Luis	4–3	60–34
2018	Gerónimo Gil	Freseros de San Quintín	4–2	66–43
2022	Hernando Arredondo	Freseros de San Quintín	4–1	
Total championships				3
