= 2002–03 Mexican Pacific League season =

- League: Mexican Pacific League
- Sport: Baseball
- Duration: 11 October 2002 – 27 January 2003
- Number of games: 300
- Number of teams: 8
- Season champions: Cañeros de Los Mochis

LMP seasons
- ← 2001–02 2003–04 →

The 2002–03 Mexican Pacific League season was the 45th season in the history of the Mexican Pacific League (LMP). It was contested by eight teams. Cañeros de Los Mochis won their third championship by defeating Yaquis de Obregón 4–1 in the final series, led by manager Juan Francisco Rodríguez.

== Standings ==
Regular season standings
Rank	Team	W	L	Pct.	GB	Pts.
1	Águilas de Mexicali	37	29	.561	—	12
2	Naranjeros de Hermosillo	36	30	.545	1.0	12
3	Yaquis de Obregón	37	31	.544	1.0	12
4	Tomateros de Culiacán	35	31	.530	2.0	11
5	Cañeros de Los Mochis	28	38	.424	9.0	10
6	Venados de Mazatlán	31	34	.477	5.5	9.5
7	Mayos de Navojoa	31	36	.463	6.5	8
8	Algodoneros de Guasave	31	37	.463	7.0	7.5

== Postseason ==
First round
Mexicali	2
Mazatlán	4
Hermosillo	1
Los Mochis	4
Obregón	4
Culiacán	2

Semi-finals
Mazatlán	1
Los Mochis	4
Obregón	4
Mexicali	3

Final
Los Mochis	4
Obregón	1

== League leaders ==
Batting leaders
Stat	Player	Team	Total
AVG	(Mexico) Heber Gómez	Venados de Mazatlán	.353
HR	(United States) Bubba Smith	Águilas de Mexicali	24
RBI	(United States) Bubba Smith	Águilas de Mexicali	64
R	(United States) Bubba Smith	Águilas de Mexicali	50
H	(Mexico) Luis Carlos García	Yaquis de Obregón	84
SB	(United States) Anton French	Mayos de Navojoa	30
SLG	(Panama) Julio Zuleta	Algodoneros de Guasave	.664

Pitching leaders
Stat	Player	Team	Total
ERA	(Mexico) Édgar González	Naranjeros de Hermosillo	1.89
W	(Mexico) Édgar González	Naranjeros de Hermosillo	8
W	(Mexico) Juan Manuel Palafox	Yaquis de Obregón	8
L	(Mexico) Manuel Bernal	Mayos de Navojoa	6
SV	(United States) Mike Garcia	Águilas de Mexicali	17
IP	(Mexico) Octavio Álvarez	Mayos de Navojoa	93.0
K	(Mexico) Francisco Campos	Venados de Mazatlán	76

== Awards ==
2002–03 LMP Awards
Award	Player	Team
Manager of the Year	(Mexico) Juan Francisco Rodríguez	Cañeros de Los Mochis
Most Valuable Player	(Mexico) Antonio Osuna	Cañeros de Los Mochis
Pitcher of the Year	(Mexico) Édgar González	Naranjeros de Hermosillo
Rookie of the Year	(Mexico) Édgar González	Naranjeros de Hermosillo
