= 1983–84 Mexican Pacific League season =

- League: Mexican Pacific League
- Sport: Baseball
- Duration: 4 October 1983 – 28 January 1984
- Number of games: 419
- Number of teams: 10
- Season champions: Cañeros de Los Mochis

LMP seasons
- ← 1982–83 1984–85 →

The 1983–84 Mexican Pacific League season was the 26th season in the history of the Mexican Pacific League (LMP). It was contested by ten teams. Cañeros de Los Mochis won their second championship by defeating Ostioneros de Guaymas 4–2 in the final series, led by manager Vinicio García.

== Standings ==
North
Rank	Team	W	L	T	Pct.	GB	Pts.
1	Potros de Tijuana	47	27	0	.635	—	10
2	Naranjeros de Hermosillo	38	35	1	.521	8.5	6
3	Ostioneros de Guaymas	36	36	2	.500	10.0	5
4	Yaquis de Obregón	34	37	2	.479	11.5	5
5	Águilas de Mexicali	36	36	0	.500	10.0	4

South
Rank	Team	W	L	T	Pct.	GB	Pts.
1	Cañeros de Los Mochis	43	31	0	.581	—	8
2	Venados de Mazatlán	36	34	2	.514	5.0	8
3	Mayos de Navojoa	30	41	3	.423	11.5	6
4	Tomateros de Culiacán	36	38	0	.486	7.0	5
5	Algodoneros de Guasave	25	46	2	.352	16.5	3

== Postseason ==
First round
N1	Tijuana	3
N3	Guaymas	5
N2	Hermosillo	2
N4	Obregón	5
S1	Los Mochis	5
S3	Navojoa	1
S2	Mazatlán	4
S4	Culiacán	5

Semifinals
N3	Guaymas	5
N4	Obregón	3
S1	Los Mochis	5
S4	Culiacán	3

Finals
N3	Guaymas	2
S1	Los Mochis	4

== League leaders ==
Batting leaders
Stat	Player	Team	Total
AVG	(United States) Jimmie Collins	Venados de Mazatlán	.314
HR	(United States) Chuck Canady	Cañeros de Los Mochis	14
RBI	(United States) Jimmie Collins	Venados de Mazatlán	46
R	(United States) Mike Felder	Yaquis de Obregón	44
H	(United States) Jimmie Collins	Venados de Mazatlán	88
SB	(United States) Mike Felder	Yaquis de Obregón	30
SLG	(United States) Chuck Canady	Cañeros de Los Mochis	.467

Pitching leaders
Stat	Player	Team	Total
ERA	(Mexico) Ramón Villegas	Mayos de Navojoa	1.10
W	(Mexico) Salvador Colorado	Potros de Tijuana	11
L	(Mexico) Maximino León	Naranjeros de Hermosillo	10
SV	(Mexico) Antonio Pulido	Tomateros de Culiacán	18
IP	(Mexico) Héctor Díaz	Ostioneros de Guaymas	162.1
K	(Mexico) Vicente Romo	Tomateros de Culiacán	100

== Awards ==
1983–84 LMP Awards
Award	Player	Team
Manager of the Year	(Mexico) Vinicio García	Cañeros de Los Mochis
Most Valuable Player	(Mexico) Aurelio Rodríguez	Cañeros de Los Mochis
Rookie of the Year	(Mexico) Armando Pruneda	Naranjeros de Hermosillo
