= Joan Carlos Pedroso =

Cuban baseball player (born 1979)

Conspiradores de Querétaro
- First baseman / Coach
- Born: 23 July 1979 (age 46); Matanzas, Matanzas Province, Cuba
- Bats: Right Throws: Right

Teams
- Las Tunas (1998–2013)
Medals
Men's baseball
Representing Cuba
World Baseball Classic
Silver medal – second place	2006 San Diego	Team
Baseball World Cup
Gold medal – first place	2003 Havana	Team
Gold medal – first place	2005 Rotterdam	Team
Pan American Games
Gold medal – first place	2003 Santo Domingo	Team

Joan Carlos Pedroso Brooks (born 23 July 1979) is a former first baseman and left fielder for Las Tunas of the Cuban National Series, and the Cuba national baseball team, and current hitting coach for the Conspiradores de Querétaro of the Mexican League. He was the backup first baseman for Cuba at the 2006 World Baseball Classic, where the team finished in second place. After retiring as a player, he has worked as a coach.

== Career ==
Pedroso was born on 23 July 1979 in Matanzas, Cuba, but his family moved to Las Tunas Province, where he started playing baseball at a young age and progressed through the local youth system before making his Cuban National Series debut in 1998 with Las Tunas. He appeared in 23 games in his debut season, recording a .308/.349/.462 batting line. Pedroso hit .353 with 22 home runs during the 2005-06 Cuban National Series.

In April 2014, Pedroso joined Nettuno 2 of the second level of Italian baseball, where he played alongside fellow Cuban pitcher Norberto González. Later, he signed with the Cañeros de Los Mochis of the Mexican Pacific League, where he played during the 2014–15 and 2015–16 seasons, totalling 59 appearances with the Cañeros across both seasons.

Since 2020, Pedroso has worked as hitting coach for the Cañeros de Los Mochis.
