= Doug Adams (baseball) =

American baseball player (born 1943)

- Catcher
- Born: January 27, 1943 (age 83); Blue River, Wisconsin, U.S.
- Batted: Left Threw: Right

MLB debut
- September 8, 1969, for the Chicago White Sox

Last MLB appearance
- October 1, 1969, for the Chicago White Sox

MLB statistics
- Batting average: .214
- Home runs: 0
- Runs batted in: 1
- Stats at Baseball Reference

Teams
- Chicago White Sox (1969)

Harold Douglas Adams (born January 27, 1943) is an American former professional baseball player who played in eight games as a late season callup during the 1969 season for the Chicago White Sox of Major League Baseball.
