= Chuck Goggin =

American baseball player (born 1945)

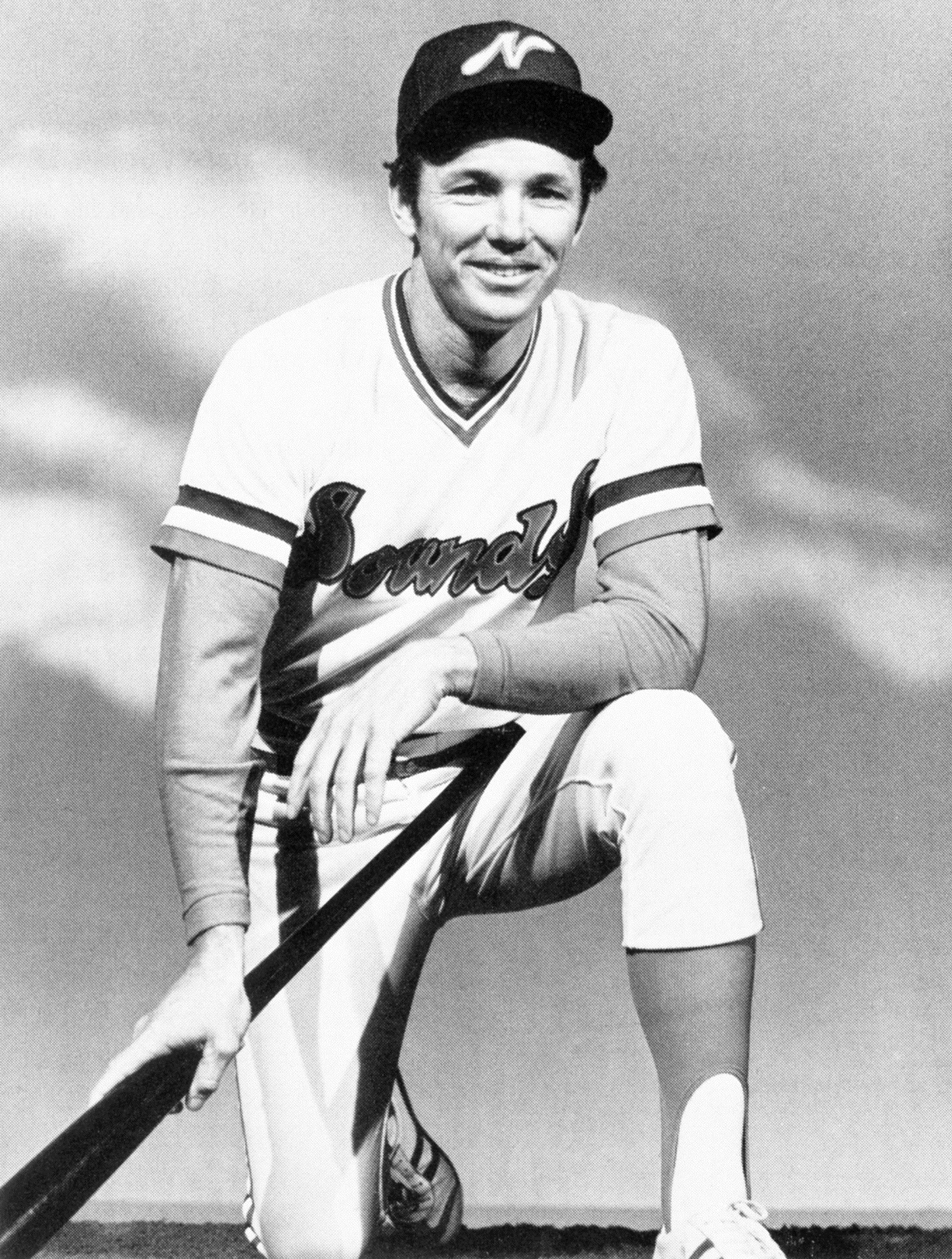
- Goggin with the Nashville Sounds in 1978
- Utility
- Born: July 7, 1945 (age 81); Pompano Beach, Florida, U.S.
- Batted: Switch Threw: Right

MLB debut
- September 8, 1972, for the Pittsburgh Pirates

Last MLB appearance
- September 22, 1974, for the Boston Red Sox

MLB statistics
- Batting average: .293
- Home runs: 0
- Runs batted in: 7
- Stats at Baseball Reference

Teams
- Pittsburgh Pirates (1972–1973); Atlanta Braves (1973); Boston Red Sox (1974)

Charles Francis Goggin (born July 7, 1945) is an American former utility player in Major League Baseball who played with three teams from 1972 to 1974 and is the most decorated Vietnam War veteran to play Major League Baseball. He played for the Pittsburgh Pirates (1972–73), Atlanta Braves (1973) and Boston Red Sox (1974).

== Playing career ==
Goggins played three years of baseball at Pompano Beach Senior High School, and was signed by his childhood favorite team, the Los Angeles Dodgers.

A pinch hitter and versatile player with a good throwing arm, Goggin made 35 appearances in all, mostly at second base, at 22 games. He also played 5 games each in left field and shortstop, two games as a backup catcher and a game in right field.

In his three-season career, Goggin was a .293 hitter (29-for-99) with seven RBI in 72 games (37 in pinch-hitting duties), including 19 runs, five doubles, and a .355 on-base percentage.

== Coaching career ==
Following his playing career, Goggin managed the Nashville Sounds of the Southern League (1978) and also won a Mexican Pacific League championship with the 1978-79 Navojoa Mayos, a team that included future big leaguers Rickey Henderson and Randy Niemann on their roster.

== Personal ==
Goggin is a Vietnam War veteran who served in the U.S. Marine Corps as a radio operator and infantry platoon commander for the full 13 month tour in 1966 and 1967. He was awarded the Bronze Star, Vietnam Cross of Galantry and the Purple Heart (wounded after stepping on a landmine) and served under Marine Col John Ripley. He was the most decorated Vietnam War veteran to play in major league baseball. Following his career in baseball, Goggin resided in Nashville, Tennessee, and served as U.S. Marshal for the Middle District of Tennessee.
