= Estadio Finsus =

Baseball stadium in Mexico

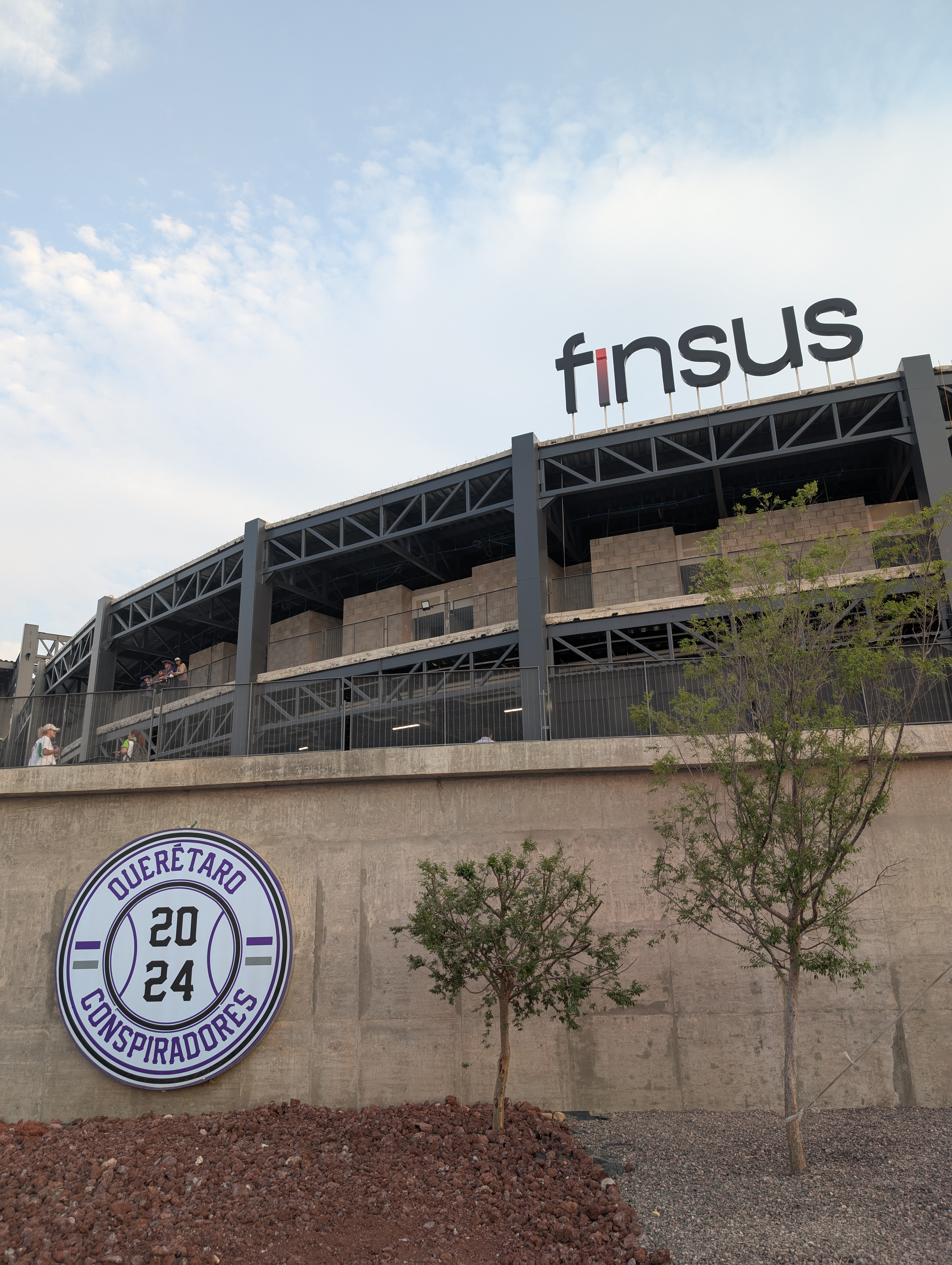
- Interactive map of Estadio Finsus
- Full name: Estadio Finsus
- Location: Huimilpan, Querétaro, Mexico
- Coordinates: 20.4244°N 100.3013°W
- Owner: State of Querétaro
- Capacity: 6,800
- Surface: Natural grass

Construction
- Opened: 2024

Tenant
- Conspiradores de Querétaro (LMB) (2024–)

Estadio Finsus is a multi-use stadium in Huimilpan, Querétaro, Mexico. It is the home of the Conspiradores de Querétaro of the Mexican Baseball League. The stadium has a capacity of 6,800 people and opened in 2024.

Initially, it was announced that the new stadium would be built in the El Marqués municipality, near the Querétaro Intercontinental Airport.. Nevertheless, in April 2023, works began in the Huimilpan municipality for the Estadio Conspiradores. The stadium was projected to have a capacity of 6,000 seated spectators and 96 boxes and was expected to be finished before the beginning of the 2024 season in April. However, the stadium was not ready for the beginning of the 2024 season due to delays in the construction, meaning that the Conspiradores will play their home inaugural series against Guerreros de Oaxaca in the Estadio Hermanos Serdán in Puebla City.

On 11 April 2024, Conspiradores announced that Finsus, a financial services enterprise, had acquired the naming rights for the stadium for a three-year period, during which the stadium will be known as Estadio Finsus.
