= Conspiradores de Querétaro =

Professional baseball team in the Mexican League

Logo	Cap insignia

Information
- League: Mexican League
- Location: Huimilpan, Querétaro
- Ballpark: Estadio Finsus
- Established: 2022
- Colors: Purple, black and white
- President: Francisco Javier Orozco
- Manager: Roberto Vizcarra

The Conspiradores de Querétaro (English: Querétaro Conspirators) are a professional baseball team in the Mexican League based in Huimilpan in the Metropolitan Area of Querétaro. Their home ballpark is the Estadio Finsus, with a capacity of 6,500 people. The team debuted in the 2024 Mexican League season.

== History ==
The Conspiradores de Querétaro were established on November 8, 2022 and officially presented that same day in the city of Querétaro. Despite historically hosting several professional sports such as a football club, Querétaro F.C., a basketball team, Libertadores de Querétaro, and an American football team, Gallos Negros de Querétaro, the state of Querétaro has never had a professional baseball team.

Purple, black and white were chosen as the club's colors and it was announced that the team would start play in 2024 and that a baseball specific stadium would be built to host the Conspiradores. The Conspiradores name references Querétaro's role as a meeting place for early figures in the Mexican independence movement.

In November 2023, the Mexican League held an expansion draft, where the Conspiradores and the Dorados de Chihuahua, the two expansion teams for the 2024 season, picked 18 players from the other Mexican League franchises. Conspiradores selected Matt Clark, Iván Salas and Casey Coleman, amongst others.

In February 2024, José Offerman joined the Conspiradores as the team's manager.

== Roster ==
Conspiradores de Querétaro roster
Players	Coaches/Other
Pitchers: 60 (Dominican Republic) Fernando Abad; 31 (United States) Tyler Alexander; 32 (United States) Solomon Bates; 2 (United States) Colten Davis; 25 (Dominican Republic) Wellington Díaz; 59 (United States) Stephen Gonsalves; 41 (Venezuela) Junior Guerra; 10 (Mexico) Isaac Jiménez; 83 (Dominican Republic) Román Méndez; 60 (Mexico) Luis Ochoa; 53 (United States) Jio Orozco; 71 (Cuba) Ramón Pérez; 17 (Mexico) Denny Román; 11 (Cuba) Miguel Romero; 46 (United States) Tyler Viza; 98 (Dominican Republic) Juan Zapata; 8 (United States) Ernesto Zaragoza; Catchers: 33 (Curaçao) Hendrik Clementina; 27 (Mexico) José Lizárraga; 84 (Mexico) Arturo Rodríguez; 29 (Mexico) Daniel Sierra; Infielders: 22 (Mexico) Daniel Castro; 47 (Cuba) Yurisbel Gracial; 39 (Dominican Republic) Kelvin Gutiérrez; 7 (Dominican Republic) Alen Hanson; 37 (Mexico) Keven Lamas; 5 (Cuba) Rangel Ravelo; 20 (Mexico) José Robledo; 26 (Venezuela) Yangervis Solarte; Outfielders: 75 (Mexico) Fabricio Macías; 69 (Dominican Republic) Rainel Rosario; 1 (Cuba) Roel Santos; 51 (Cuba) Henry Urrutia	Manager: -- (Mexico) Juan Francisco Rodríguez; Coaches: -- (Mexico) Rubén Estrada (third base); 95 (Mexico) Karim García (first base); -- (Mexico) Jesús González (assistant); -- (Mexico) Emigdio López (pitching); -- (Mexico) Luis Niebla (bullpen); -- (Cuba) Joan Carlos Pedroso (hitting); -- (Dominican Republic) Rafael Rijo (infield/outfield); 7-day injured list; ~ Development list; # Rehab assignment; ∞ Reserve list; ‡ Restricted list; § Suspended list; † Temporarily inactive list; Roster updated July 17, 2026; Transactions; → More rosters: MiLB • Mexican League
