= Bob Priddy (baseball) =

American baseball player (1939–2023)

- Pitcher
- Born: December 10, 1939; Pittsburgh, Pennsylvania, U.S.
- Died: September 28, 2023 (aged 83); Coraopolis, Pennsylvania, U.S.
- Batted: Right Threw: Right

MLB debut
- September 20, 1962, for the Pittsburgh Pirates

Last MLB appearance
- September 12, 1971, for the Atlanta Braves

MLB statistics
- Win–loss record: 24–38
- Earned run average: 4.00
- Strikeouts: 294
- Stats at Baseball Reference

Teams
- Pittsburgh Pirates (1962, 1964); San Francisco Giants (1965–1966); Washington Senators (1967); Chicago White Sox (1968–1969); California Angels (1969); Atlanta Braves (1969–1971)

Robert Simpson Priddy (December 10, 1939 – September 28, 2023) was an American professional baseball player. He was a right-handed pitcher in Major League Baseball from 1962 to 1971, with the exception of the 1963 season. Priddy batted right-handed, stood 6 feet 1 inch (1.85 m) tall and weighed 200 pounds (91 kg). He was born in Pittsburgh, Pennsylvania, and graduated from high school in nearby McKees Rocks.

== Baseball career ==
After signing with his hometown Pittsburgh Pirates in 1959, Priddy spent 13 seasons in professional baseball. Called to the Pirates after the completion of the 1962 minor-league season, he got credit for a victory in his MLB debut. Entering the September 20 game in the ninth inning with the Bucs trailing the Cincinnati Reds 3–1 at Forbes Field, Priddy held Cincinnati off the scoresheet. Then, in the home half of the ninth, Pittsburgh rallied for three runs to claim the victory for Priddy.

His next major-league audition came during the 1964 campaign, when he worked in 19 games pitched, all of them in relief, and compiled a 1–2 won–lost record, with one save and an earned run average of 3.93.

The Pirates then packaged Priddy in a February 1965 trade, sending him and first baseman Bob Burda to the San Francisco Giants for veteran catcher Del Crandall. The Giants loaned Priddy to the Pirates' Columbus Jets Triple-A affiliate for the bulk of the 1965 season, but were able to use him in eight games out of the bullpen. Then, in 1966, Priddy spent his first full season in the majors, working in 38 games for the Giants, including three assignments as a starting pitcher. Although Priddy lost all three starts, they were the only defeats he absorbed all year, going 6–0 as a relief pitcher with one save. San Francisco then used him in an off-season inter-league trade with the Washington Senators to reacquire left-hander Mike McCormick.

The 1967 Senators and 1968 Chicago White Sox gave Priddy 26 opportunities as a starting pitcher. Two of Priddy's 1967 starts came against the pennant-bound Boston Red Sox, and he defeated them each time (on June 16 and August 23). But he won only three contests all year, and lost seven decisions, with four saves. The White Sox acquired Priddy in February 1968, and he worked in 114 innings pitched for them, a career high, with 18 starts that season. But he posted a 3–11 won–lost mark, and soon was on the move again, traded to the California Angels on May 14, 1969 in a deal that netted Chicago second baseman Bobby Knoop.

After 15 games with the Angels, and a stint at Triple-A Hawaii, Priddy was acquired by the contending Atlanta Braves on September 8, along with Baseball Hall of Fame knuckleball artist Hoyt Wilhelm; one of the prospects the Angels received in return was Mickey Rivers, then a 20-year-old minor-leaguer. Atlanta turned out to be Priddy's last stop in professional baseball. He worked in 82 games, all in relief, through the 1971 season, won nine games (losing 14) and saved 12 more, with a mediocre ERA of 4.79.

For his major-league career, Priddy appeared in 249 games, 220 in relief, and posted a 24–38 (4.00) record with 18 saves and three complete games. In 536 innings pitched, he permitted 518 hits and 198 bases on balls, with 294 strikeouts.

== Later life ==
Priddy died on September 28, 2023, at the age of 83. He is interred at Homewood Cemetery.
