= José Peña (baseball) =

Mexican baseball player (born 1942)

- Pitcher
- Born: December 3, 1942 (age 83); Ciudad Juárez, Chihuahua, Mexico
- Batted: Right Threw: Right

MLB debut
- June 1, 1969, for the Cincinnati Reds

Last MLB appearance
- July 14, 1972, for the Los Angeles Dodgers

MLB statistics
- Win–loss record: 7–4
- Earned run average: 4.97
- Strikeouts: 82
- Stats at Baseball Reference

Teams
- Cincinnati Reds (1969); Los Angeles Dodgers (1970–1972)

Member of the Mexican Professional

Baseball Hall of Fame
- Induction: 1992

José "Peluche" Peña Gutiérrez (born December 3, 1942) is a Mexican former pitcher in Major League Baseball. He pitched from 1969 to 1972 for the Cincinnati Reds and Los Angeles Dodgers.

Gutiérrez played winter baseball in the Mexican Pacific League for 22 seasons with the Cañeros de Los Mochis, Naranjeros de Hermosillo, Venados de Mazatlán, Algodoneros de Guasave, Mayos de Navojoa and Ostioneros de Guaymas.

In February 2025, Peña was selected by a committee of journalists as a pitcher for the Mexican League Centennial All-Time Team on the occasion of the league's hundredth anniversary.
