= Jerry Nyman =

American baseball player (born 1942)

- Pitcher
- Born: January 23, 1942 (age 84); Logan, Utah, U.S.
- Batted: Left Threw: Left

MLB debut
- August 24, 1968, for the Chicago White Sox

Last MLB appearance
- September 27, 1970, for the San Diego Padres

MLB statistics
- Win–loss record: 6–7
- Earned run average: 4.57
- Strikeouts: 69
- Stats at Baseball Reference

Teams
- Chicago White Sox (1968–1969); San Diego Padres (1970)

Gerald Smith Nyman (born November 23, 1942) is an American former left-handed Major League Baseball pitcher who played from 1968 to 1970 for the Chicago White Sox and San Diego Padres. He attended Brigham Young University.

== Playing career ==
Signed as an undrafted free-agent by the White Sox in 1965, Nyman began his professional career that year with the Sarasota Sun Sox. With them, he went 16–11 with a 2.81 ERA in 30 games. In 192 innings pitched, he walked 137 batters. He split the 1966 season between the Deerfield Beach/Winter Haven Sun Sox, Fox Cities Foxes and Lynchburg White Sox, going a combined 6–11 with a 2.46 ERA in 20 games. In 1967, he played for the Evansville White Sox, going 7–4 with a 2.74 ERA in seven games.

Nyman spent most of the 1968 season with the Hawaii Islanders, going 7–5 with a 3.09 ERA in 23 games with them. On August 24 of that year, he made his big league debut, facing the Minnesota Twins. He pitched 2/3 of an inning in relief in his first game, allowing a hit and a walk but surrendering no runs.

His first game would be the only relief appearance of his first big league seasons. He went on to start seven games for the White Sox, throwing a complete-game shutout in his first career start. In eight big league games in 1968, Nyman went 2–1 with a 2.01 ERA.

In 20 games (10 starts) with the White Sox in 1969, Nyman went 4–4 with a 5.29 ERA. His first start of the 1969 season was a complete-game shutout as well. He also spent some time in the minors that year as well, going 2–3 with a 2.74 ERA in seven games with the Tucson Toros.

On March 30, 1970, Nyman was traded to the Padres for Tommie Sisk. He appeared in two games with the Padres, going 0–2 with a 15.19 ERA. For the Salt Lake City Bees - with whom he spent most of the year - Nyman went 9–13 with a 4.09 ERA in 37 games.

He played his final big league game on September 27, 1970, however he continued his minor league career until 1971. That year, he played for the Lodi Padres, Evansville Triplets and Hawaii Islanders, going a combined 2–9 with a 4.59 ERA in 28 games.

Overall, he went 6–7 with a 4.57 ERA in 30 big league games (17 starts). In the minors, he went 49–56 with a 3.26 ERA in 166 games (129 starts).

== Coaching career ==
Nyman was a Minor League Baseball coach and manager for over 30 years. He served as the pitching coach for the Idaho Falls Padres in 2003. From 2004 to 2006, he served as the minor league pitching coordinator for the Tampa Bay Devil Rays. In 2007 and 2008, he was the pitching coach for the Idaho Falls Chukars, and in 2009 he is the pitching coach for the Burlington Bees. He has also coached for the Salinas Spurs, Eugene Emeralds and Welland Pirates.
