= Chevron Park =

Stadium in Los Mochis, Mexico

Coordinates: 25°48′10.94″N 108°58′28.78″W

Chevron Park is a stadium in Los Mochis, Mexico. It is primarily used for baseball and serves as the home stadium for Cañeros de Los Mochis. The stadium has a capacity of 12,500 people.

The stadium was built in 1947 with an initial capacity of 3,000. In 1982, the stadium was badly damaged by Hurricane Paul, which restricted the team to day games only the following season, as they were without lights.

In 2014, the stadium hosted group C of the 2014 15U Baseball World Cup
