= Paul Edmondson =

American baseball player (1943–1970)

- 1970 Topps baseball card #414
- Pitcher
- Born: February 12, 1943; Kansas City, Kansas, U.S.
- Died: February 13, 1970 (aged 27); Santa Barbara, California, U.S.
- Batted: Right Threw: Right

MLB debut
- June 20, 1969, for the Chicago White Sox

Last MLB appearance
- September 25, 1969, for the Chicago White Sox

MLB statistics
- Win–loss record: 1–6
- Earned run average: 3.70
- Strikeouts: 46
- Stats at Baseball Reference

Teams
- Chicago White Sox (1969)

Paul Michael Edmondson (February 12, 1943 – February 13, 1970) was an American Major League Baseball (MLB) pitcher.

== Early life and education ==
Born in Kansas City, Kansas, the right-hander attended California State University, Northridge where he played both baseball and basketball for the Matadors.

== Career ==
In June, 1965 Edmondson was drafted by the Chicago White Sox in the 21st round (419th overall) of the first-ever MLB amateur entry draft. In his major league debut on June 20, 1969, Edmondson pitched a complete game two-hitter in a 9–1 White Sox victory over the California Angels.

Edmondson started thirteen of the fourteen games he appeared in during his MLB career. He had the second-best earned run average (3.70) of any of the six White Sox pitchers who started ten or more games during the 1969 season.

Some of Paul Edmondson's efforts in 1969:

- 9 innings, 0 earned runs vs. Oakland—NO DECISION (September 13)
- 9 1/3 innings, 1 earned run vs. California—NO DECISION (September 6)
- 8 innings, 1 earned run vs. Kansas City—NO DECISION (September 25)
- 7 innings, 1 earned run vs. Oakland—LOST 2-1 (July 8)
- 6 2/3 innings, 1 earned run vs. California—NO DECISION (July 4)
- 7 1/3 innings, 3 earned runs vs. Washington—NO DECISION (August 6)
- 6 innings, 3 earned runs vs. Seattle—LOST 3-1 (June 25)

== Death ==
While traveling south on rain-soaked U.S. Route 101 near Santa Barbara, California on February 13, 1970, the day after his 27th birthday, his automobile skidded and crashed into oncoming northbound traffic, killing Edmondson and his passenger, Lauraine Leas, 22, of Simi Valley, California. They had traveled from Simi to San Luis Obispo where Lauraine would be attending Cal Poly the following semester. The tragedy occurred only two weeks prior to spring training, and the White Sox had hoped that Edmondson would become the fourth starter in the rotation.

Edmondson was interred at Valley Oaks Memorial Park.

== See also ==
- Chicago White Sox all-time roster
- List of baseball players who died during their careers
