= Cañeros de Los Mochis =

Mexican baseball team

Logo	Cap insignia

Information
- League: Mexican Pacific League
- Location: Los Mochis, Sinaloa
- Ballpark: Chevron Park
- Founded: 1947
- League championships: 4 (1968–69, 1983–84, 2002–03, 2022–23)
- Colors: Green, gold and white
- Mascot: Pepe Cañas
- Retired numbers: 4; 5; 14; 24; 27; 29; 49
- Ownership: Club de Baseball Los Mochis, S.A. de C.V.
- President: Joaquín Vega Inzunza
- Manager: Félix Fermín
- Website: www.cañeros.net

The Cañeros de Los Mochis (English: Los Mochis Sugar Canes) are a professional baseball team based in Los Mochis, Sinaloa, Mexico. They compete in the Mexican Pacific League (LMP). The team plays at the Estadio Emilio Ibarra Almada with a capacity of 12,500 seated spectators.

The Cañeros have won the LMP championship four times in 1968–69, 1983–84, 2002–03 and most recently in 2022–23.

== History ==
Cañeros de Los Mochis made their debut on 25 October 1947 in the Liga de la Costa del Pacífico (Pacific Coast League).

The Cañeros won their first Mexican Pacific League championship during the 1968–69 season, in which the top ranked team by the end of the season were crowned as champions. Los Mochis achieved this on 7 January 1969 by defeating Naranjeros de Hermosillo 6–3 in the final round robin. The team was managed by Benjamín Valenzuela.

In 1983–84, Los Mochis won their second LMP championship and classified for the first time in the team's history to the Caribbean Series. The Cañeros, managed by Vinicio García, defeated the Ostioneros de Guaymas in the final series, 4–2. In the Cañeros' debut at that year's Caribbean Series, the team finished second with a 4–2 record, and three Los Mochis players were included in the All-Star Team: second baseman Juan Francisco Rodríguez, third baseman Aurelio Rodríguez and designated hitter Jim Collins.

The Cañeros won their third LMP championship in the 2002–03 season, managed by Juan Francisco Rodríguez, defeating Yaquis de Obregón in the final series, 4–1. Los Mochis represented Mexico at the 2003 Caribbean Series, where they lost all their six games and ranked last.

The Cañeros won their most recent and fourth championship on 28 January 2023, for the 2022–23 Mexican Pacific League season. They defeated the Algodoneros de Guasave in six games.

== Roster ==
Cañeros de Los Mochis roster
Active roster		Coaches
Pitchers: 83 (Mexico) Jordy Arias; 59 (Mexico) Erubiel Armenta; 28 (Mexico) Omar Araujo; 54 (Mexico) Juan Cázarez; 99 (Mexico) Guadalupe Chávez; 23 (Mexico) Fabián Cota; 17 (United States) Colten Davis; 62 (Mexico) Jesús Gámez; 43 (Mexico) Juan Gámez; 83 (Mexico) Rodolfo García; 76 (Mexico) Jonás Garibay; 96 (United States) Tanner Kiest; 42 (Mexico) Miguel Ángel León; 73 (Mexico) José Luna; 67 (Mexico) Irvin Machuca; 45 (Mexico) Luis Fernando Miranda; 25 (Cuba) Yoanner Negrín; 60 (Mexico) Manuel Urías; 30 (Mexico) Vicente Valenzuela	Catchers: 86 (Mexico) Mario Gómez; 72 (Mexico) Juan Uriarte; 6 (Mexico) Alejandro Urías; Infielders: 48 (Mexico) Rodolfo Amador; 2 (Mexico) Alejo López; 6 (Mexico) Aarón Lugo; 74 (Mexico) Isaac Rodríguez; 31 (Cuba) Yasmany Tomás; 81 (Mexico) Luis Roberto Urías; Outfielders: 83 (United States) Eric Filia; 47 (Cuba) Yurisbel Gracial; 58 (Mexico) Diego Soto; 0 (United States) Nick Williams	Manager: 10 (Dominican Republic) Félix Fermín; Coaches: 40 (Mexico) Víctor Bojórquez (outfielders); -- (United States) Chris Coste (catchers); 26 (Cuba) Jesús Manso (pitching); 33 (Mexico) Oswaldo Morejón (bench coach); -- (Cuba) Joan Carlos Pedroso (hitting); -- (Mexico) Arturo Ruiz (bullpen); Roster updated on 22 December 2025

=== Retired numbers ===
The Cañeros de Los Mochis have retired the following numbers:

- 3: Juan Francisco Rodríguez
- 4: Aurelio Rodríguez
- 5: Saúl Soto
- 14: Benjamín Valenzuela
- 24: Ramón Orantes
- 27: Andrés Mora
- 29: José Peña
- 49: Teodoro Higuera

== Championships ==
Season	Manager	Opponent	Series score	Record
1968–69	Benjamín Valenzuela	No final series		46–33
1983–84	Vinicio García	Ostioneros de Guaymas	4–2	57–37
2002–03	Juan Francisco Rodríguez	Yaquis de Obregón	4–1	40–41
2022–23	José Moreno	Algodoneros de Guasave	4–2	53–32
Total championships			4	

== Caribbean Series record ==
Year	Venue	Finish	Wins	Losses	Win%	Manager
1984	(Puerto Rico) San Juan	2nd	4	2	.667	(Mexico) Vinicio García
2003	(Puerto Rico) Carolina	4th	0	6	.000	(Mexico) Juan Francisco Rodríguez
2023	(Venezuela) Great Caracas	3rd	6	3	.667	(Venezuela) José Moreno
Total			10	11	.476	

== Notable players ==
- (United States) Fernando Arroyo
- (Mexico) Andrés Ávila
- (United States) Jason Bourgeois
- (United States) Mike Cameron
- (Mexico) Matías Carrillo
- (United States) Justin Christian
- (Mexico) Rafael Díaz
- (Cuba) Yadir Drake
- (United States) Mike Easler
- (United States) Cal Emery
- (Mexico) Ernesto Escárrega
- (Mexico) Teodoro Higuera
- (Mexico) Gregorio Luque
- (United States) Junior Moore
- (Mexico) Andrés Mora
- (Japan) Yudai Mori
- (Cuba) Tony Oliva
- (Mexico) Antonio Osuna
- (Mexico) José Peña
- (Mexico) Alfonso Pulido
- (Mexico) Aurelio Rodríguez
- (United States) Don Secrist
- (United States) Dan Serafini
- (United States) Ed Vosberg
