= Juan Francisco Rodríguez (baseball) =

Mexican baseball player

Conspiradores de Querétaro
- Second baseman / Manager / Bench coach
- Born: 12 September 1960 (age 65); Monterrey, Nuevo León, Mexico
- Bats: Right Throws: Right
- Stats at Baseball Reference

Member of the Mexican Professional

Baseball Hall of Fame
- Induction: 2012

Juan Francisco "Chico" Rodríguez (born 12 September 1960) is a Mexican former professional baseball infielder and manager who currently serves as the bench coach for the Conspiradores de Querétaro of the Mexican League.

== Playing career ==
Juan Francisco Rodríguez was born in Monterrey, Nuevo León on 12 September 1960. He made his professional debut in the Mexican League for the Cafeteros de Córdoba in 1977, aged 16. In 1980, he moved to the Broncos de Reynosa, where played the next four seasons. In 1983, Rodríguez joined the Bravos de León, where he played until 1987. In 1988 and 1989, Rodríguez played for the Leones de Yucatán. In 1990, Rodríguez transferred to his hometown club Sultanes de Monterrey, where he was part of the team that won the 1991 season. In 1993, Rodríguez was signed by the Rieleros de Aguascalientes and spent the 1994 season split between Aguascalientes and Industriales de Monterrey. In 1995, he played for Rojos del Águila de Veracruz and Reynosa.

Rodríguez retired in 1995. He played 1924 games, scored 1030 runs with an average of .293 and 1948 hits. He batted 34 home runs, 666 RBIs and stole 196 bases.

Rodríguez also spent fifteen seasons playing in the Mexican Pacific League for the Cañeros de Los Mochis and retired in 2005. While playing for Los Mochis, Rodríguez participated in the 1984 Caribbean Series, where he was selected as part of the All-Star Team.

== Coaching career ==
In 2003, Rodríguez won the Mexican Pacific League championship with the Cañeros de Los Mochis as manager. Rodríguez replaced Mario Mendoza as manager of the Cañeros and led the team to their third championship after defeating Yaquis de Obregón 4–1 in the final series.

Rodríguez managed the Cañeros at the 2003 Caribbean Series, where the team finished last losing all the six games.

In January 2011, Rodríguez was appointed manager of Vaqueros Laguna, ahead of the 2011 season.

In June 2021, Rodríguez joined Yucatán again, this time as bench coach.

On 24 May 2026, Rodríguez replaced Dan Firova as interim manager of the Conspiradores de Querétaro of the Mexican League.

== Legacy ==
In September 2012, Rodríguez was elected to the Mexican Professional Baseball Hall of Fame.

On 15 October 2025, before the inaugural game of the 2025–26 Mexican Pacific League season, the Cañeros de Los Mochis honored Rodríguez by retiring his number 3.
