= Benny Valenzuela =

Mexican baseball player (1933–2018)

- Third baseman
- Born: June 2, 1933; Los Mochis, Sinaloa, Mexico
- Died: October 24, 2018 (aged 85); Los Mochis, Sinaloa, Mexico
- Batted: Right Threw: Right

MLB debut
- April 27, 1958, for the St. Louis Cardinals

Last MLB appearance
- September 24, 1958, for the St. Louis Cardinals

MLB statistics
- Batting average: .214
- Hits: 3
- Stats at Baseball Reference

Teams
- St. Louis Cardinals (1958)

Career highlights and awards
- Cañeros de Los Mochis #14 retired

Member of the Mexican Professional

Baseball Hall of Fame
- Induction: 1986

Benjamín Valenzuela Beltrán (2 June 1933 – 24 October 2018) was a Mexican professional baseball player, a third baseman who appeared in ten Major League Baseball games for the St. Louis Cardinals during the 1958 season. Nicknamed "Papelero" in his native Mexico, he threw and batted right-handed, stood 5 feet 10 inches (1.78 m) tall and weighed 175 pounds (79 kg).

== Career ==
His abbreviated MLB service notwithstanding, Valenzuela played 20 years in professional baseball (1952–71), with the last decade spent exclusively in the Double-A Mexican League and lower-classification Mexican minor leagues. He began his pro career with the Bisbee-Douglas Copper Kings, an unaffiliated team in the Class C Arizona–Texas League, then was drafted into the Cardinal organization in 1955. After hitting .314 and .286 in consecutive seasons with the Double-A Houston Buffaloes in 1956–57, he received early- and late-season auditions with the 1958 Redbirds, spending the bulk of that year with Triple-A Omaha. He singled in his first MLB at bat off Johnny Podres of the Los Angeles Dodgers on April 27, but overall collected only three hits in 14 at bats with a base on balls during his lone big-league campaign. At the close of the 1958 season, Valenzuela was traded to the San Francisco Giants in a five-player transaction that netted the Cardinals right-handed pitcher Ernie Broglio.

Valenzuela owed his nickname, "Papelero", because he worked as a paperboy; he also worked as batboy for the Cañeros de Los Mochis before turning into a professional baseball player.

After his playing retirement, he became manager of the Alijadores de Tampico in the Mexican League, winning one title in 1975.

He was inducted into the Mexican Professional Baseball Hall of Fame in 1986.

Valenzuela died on 24 October 2018 in his hometown Los Mochis, Sinaloa.
