= Fred Rath Jr. =

American baseball player (born 1973)

- Pitcher
- Born: January 5, 1973 (age 53); Dallas, Texas, U.S.
- Batted: Right Threw: Right

MLB debut
- July 29, 1998, for the Colorado Rockies

Last MLB appearance
- August 4, 1998, for the Colorado Rockies

MLB statistics
- Win–loss record: 0-0
- Earned run average: 1.69
- Strikeouts: 2
- Stats at Baseball Reference

Teams
- Colorado Rockies (1998)

Frederick Helsher Rath Jr. (born January 5, 1973) is an American former Major League Baseball pitcher who played for the Colorado Rockies in 1998.

== Amateur career ==
A native of Dallas, Texas, Rath graduated in 1991 from Thomas Jefferson High School in Tampa, Florida, and joined Fred McGriff, Tino Martinez, Luis Gonzalez, Tony Larussa, Sam Militello, and Lenny Faedo as MLB alumni from Jefferson High. The New York Yankees selected Rath in the 29th round of the 1991 MLB draft, but Rath opted to attend the University of South Florida, where he was a starting pitcher for four years. In 1992, he played collegiate summer baseball in the Cape Cod Baseball League for the Yarmouth-Dennis Red Sox.

== Professional career ==
He was signed by the Minnesota Twins as an un-drafted amateur free agent in 1995. Rath played his first professional season with their rookie league Elizabethton Twins in 1995 where he posted a 1.35 era in 33.1 innings, recording 50 strikeouts and 12 saves to lead the team. In 1996, Rath made the Midwest League All-Star Team while playing for the Fort Wayne Wizards with 14 saves and a 1.51 era in 41.2 innings. He also struck out 63 batters and walked just 10. Rath earned a promotion to the Fort Myers Miracle after the all-star break and recorded another 4 saves in 29 innings of work. In 1997, Rath made the journey from Class A Fort Myers Miracle to Class AAA Salt Lake Buzz, where he combined for 17 saves with a 2.21 era in 83.1 innings of work.

Rath was added to Minnesota's Major League roster to start the 1998 season. Just after the start of the season, Rath was placed on waivers and was selected by the Colorado Rockies and made his major league debut on July 29, 1998. He played during one season at the major league level for the Colorado Rockies.

During spring training of 1999, Rath was placed on waivers and selected by the Minnesota Twins and assigned to AAA Salt Lake Buzz. In 2000, Rath was traded to St. Louis Cardinals and assigned to AAA Memphis Redbirds and helped contribute to Memphis's championship season. Towards the end of 2000, Rath was traded to the Pittsburgh Pirates for a player to be named, and assigned to AAA Nashville Sound; primarily a reliever, Rath was inserted into Nashville Sound's starting rotation. During spring training 2001, the St. Louis Cardinals completed Rath's trade by selecting him back from Pittsburgh Pirates, and assigned Rath to AAA Memphis. In 2002, Rath retired from the Chicago Cubs before the start of the season.

== Personal ==
Rath's father, Fred Rath Sr. also played professionally for the Chicago White Sox in 1967 and 1968. Rath now lives in Tampa, Florida, with his wife Kirstie and four children, Ashley, Eva, Freddy (III), and Austin.

== See also ==
- List of second-generation Major League Baseball players
