= Ramón Orantes =

Mexican baseball player and manager (born 1979)

- Infielder / Manager
- Born: 5 December 1973 (age 52); Todos Santos, Baja California Sur, Mexico
- Bats: Right Throws: Right

Career highlights and awards
- Cañeros de Los Mochis #24 retired

Member of the Mexican Professional

Baseball Hall of Fame
- Induction: 2024

Ramón Orantes Rodarte (born 5 December 1973) is a Mexican professional baseball manager and former infielder.

Orantes spent his entire playing career in Mexico, appearing in 24 seasons in the Mexican League (LMB) and 23 seasons in the Mexican Pacific League (LMP), primarily as a third baseman, although he also played first base. In 2024, he was inducted into the Mexican Professional Baseball Hall of Fame.

== Early life ==
Orantes was born in Todos Santos, La Paz Municipality, Baja California Sur on 5 December 1973.

== Playing career ==
=== Mexican League ===
Orantes made his professional debut in the Mexican League (LMB) in 1993 with the Sultanes de Monterrey, appearing in three games during his rookie season. He became the club's starting third baseman in 1994, replacing Germán Rivera, and was a member of Monterrey's championship-winning team in 1995.

During the 1996 season, he began the year with the Sultanes before being loaned to the Algodoneros de Unión Laguna and later to the Rieleros de Aguascalientes. He opened the 1997 season with Monterrey and was subsequently loaned to Aguascalientes for a second consecutive year. Orantes spent the entire 1998 season with the Rieleros before returning to the Sultanes, where he played from 1999 to 2007. He was transferred to the Dorados de Chihuahua in 2007 and remained with the club through 2010. He later played for the Olmecas de Tabasco from 2011 to 2014 and the Saraperos de Saltillo from 2015 to 2016. Orantes retired following the 2016 season.

Mexican League career statistics
Seasons	G	AB	R	H	2B	3B	HR	RBI	SB	BB	BA	SLG
24	1972	6867	897	2183	314	31	143	1034	40	478	.318	.435

=== Mexican Pacific League ===
Orantes played 23 seasons in the Mexican Pacific League (LMP). He made his debut during the 1993–94 season with the Yaquis de Obregón. He spent his first three campaigns with the club before joining the Águilas de Mexicali for the 1996–97 season. Orantes later joined the Cañeros de Los Mochis, where he played from 1998 until his retirement following the 2016–17 season. On 15 November 2015, he recorded his 1,000th LMP hit, becoming just the 13th player in league history to reach the milestone.

Mexican Pacific League career statistics
Seasons	G	AB	R	H	2B	3B	HR	RBI	SB	BB	BA	SLG
23	1090	3608	427	1021	137	4	124	502	13	243	.283	.500

== Coaching and managerial career ==
=== Vaqueros Laguna / Algodoneros de Unión Laguna ===
After retiring as player following the 2016 Mexican League season, Orantes was announced as the new manager for Vaqueros Laguna on 22 November 2016, ahead of the 2017 season, replacing Daniel Fernández. The team finished fifth in the North Zone and failed to qualify to the playoffs.

The Vaqueros changed their name to the Algodoneros de Unión Laguna for the following season. After the club failed to qualify for the playoffs in both 2018 tournaments, Orantes was dismissed and replaced by Jonathan Aceves.

=== Olmecas de Tabasco ===
In 2019, Orantes joined the Olmecas de Tabasco as their new manager. After the Olmecas finished last in the South Zone with a 45–72 record, Orantes was replaced by Pedro Meré on 7 October 2019.

=== Algodoneros de Unión Laguna (second stint) ===
On 26 May 2022, Orantes replaced Óscar Robles as interim manager of the Algodoneros de Unión Laguna; he was later ratified as manager for the rest of the season. He led the team to the playoffs, where they were eliminated by the Tecolotes de los Dos Laredos in the first round.

On 14 July 2023, Orantes was dismissed and replaced by José Molina.

=== Caliente de Durango ===
In 2025, Orantes joined Caliente de Durango as the team's bench coach, under manager Ronny Paulino. On 12 May, he was named interim manager following Paulino's departure. Orantes managed the club to a 19–28 record before being replaced by Ramón Valdez on 11 July.

=== Pericos de Puebla ===
On 24 November 2025, Orantes joined the Pericos de Puebla as the hitting coach on Darryl Brinkley's coaching staff. On 22 May 2026, he was promoted to manager after Brinkley was dismissed. On 6 November 2026, he was replaced by Sergio Omar Gastélum.

== Managerial statistics ==
=== Mexican League ===
Year	Team	Regular season						Postseason			
Year	Team	Games	Won	Lost	Tied	Pct.	Finish	Won	Lost	Pct.	Notes
2017	Vaqueros Laguna	109	60	49	0	.550	5th in North	–	–	–	–
2018	Algodoneros de Unión Laguna	57	23	34	0	.404	7th in North	–	–	–	–
2018	Algodoneros de Unión Laguna	57	18	39	0	.316	8th in North	–	–	–	–
2019	Olmecas de Tabasco	117	45	72	0	.385	8th in South	–	–	–	–
2022	Algodoneros de Unión Laguna	59	39	20	0	.661	5th in North	1	4	.200	Lost first round (Dos Laredos)
2023	Algodoneros de Unión Laguna	69	38	31	0	.551	–	–	–	–	–
2025	Caliente de Durango	47	19	28	0	.404	–	–	–	–	–
Total		76	28	48	0	.368					

== Legacy ==
On 13 October 2016, the Cañeros de Los Mochis retired Orantes' number 24.

Orantes was enshrined into the Mexican Professional Baseball Hall of Fame as part of the class of 2024 alongside pitchers Yovani Gallardo, Juan Manuel Palafox, Cecilio Ruiz and Richard Sandate, infielder Miguel Flores, and umpire Luis Alberto Ramírez.
