= Isaac Rodríguez =

Mexican baseball player (born 1991)

Toros de Tijuana – No. 74
- Infielder
- Born: March 3, 1991 (age 34); Hermosillo, Mexico
- Bats: Right Throws: Right

Career highlights and awards
- Mexican League Rookie of the Year Award (2016)

Isaac Rodríguez (born March 3, 1991) is a Mexican professional baseball infielder for the Toros de Tijuana of the Mexican League. Rodríguez is listed at 5 feet 11 inches (1.80 m) and 180 pounds (82 kg) and bats and throws right handed.

== Career ==
On June 30, 2015, Rodríguez signed with the Toros de Tijuana of the Mexican League. In his debut year, he slashed .273/.333/.364 with 1 RBI in 14 games. In 2016, Rodríguez played in 83 games for Tijuana, slashing .307/.365/.389 with 2 home runs and 27 RBI. The following season, Rodríguez batted .271/.345/.346 with 3 home runs and 27 RBI in 74 games for the Toros. In 2018, Rodriguez hit career-highs in home runs (8) and RBI (61) in 103 contests for Tijuana. For the 2019 season, Rodríguez hit .316/.389/.430 with 8 home runs and 55 RBI. Rodríguez did not play in a game in 2020 due to the cancellation of the Mexican League season because of the COVID-19 pandemic.

Rodríguez played in 79 games for Tijuana in 2023, hitting .308/.402/.375 with no home runs, 25 RBI, and 19 stolen bases.

== International career ==
Rodríguez was selected to the Mexico national baseball team at the 2020 Summer Olympics (contested in 2021).
