= Don Secrist =

American baseball player (1944–2025)

- Pitcher
- Born: February 26, 1944; Seattle, Washington, U.S.
- Died: January 30, 2025 (aged 80); Centralia, Illinois, U.S.
- Batted: Left Threw: Left

MLB debut
- April 11, 1969, for the Chicago White Sox

Last MLB appearance
- June 27, 1970, for the Chicago White Sox

MLB statistics
- Win–loss record: 0–1
- Earned run average: 5.93
- Strikeouts: 32
- Stats at Baseball Reference

Teams
- Chicago White Sox (1969–1970)

Donald Laverne Secrist (February 26, 1944 – January 30, 2025) was an American professional baseball player, a left-handed pitcher who appeared in 28 games played, all in relief, for the 1969–1970 Chicago White Sox of Major League Baseball.

== Biography ==
Secrist's pro career began with two outstanding seasons in minor league baseball. After signing with the Baltimore Orioles, he was undefeated in seven decisions with a 1.96 earned run average for the 1963 Aberdeen Pheasants of the Class A Northern League. Drafted in the 1963 minor league daft that by the Cincinnati Reds following that season, Secrist spent five more years in the Reds' farm system. In his last, in 1968, he went 11-2 for the Indianapolis Indians of the Triple-A Pacific Coast League. Following that campaign, he was dealt with catcher Don Pavletich to the White Sox for pitcher Jack Fisher. Pitching in the Mexican Pacific League that winter, Secrist had 15 wins and won the MVP award.

Secrist then spent much of the 1969 season with the MLB White Sox, making his debut during the home opener of the expansion Seattle Pilots at Sick's Stadium in his native city. He recorded his only MLB decision, a loss, on July 16 against the Minnesota Twins. Secrist pitched four innings that day and allowed only two runs, but he gave up the game-winning tally on a home run by Minnesota's Rich Reese. The next day, he broke his hand in another appearance against the Twins, ending his season with the Sox. In 1970, he appeared in nine more games for the White Sox during April, May and June before returning to the minor leagues. In 28 games and 542/3 innings pitched as a Major Leaguer, Secrist allowed 54 hits, nine home runs, and 26 bases on balls with 32 strikeouts. Her spent the 1971 season pitching for the Tacoma Cubs in the PCL and retired following the season.

After baseball, Secrist worked in the coal industry. Secrist died in Centralia, Illinois, on January 30, 2025, at the age of 80.
