= Fred Rath Sr. =

American baseball player (born 1943)

Fred Rath
- Pitcher
- Born: September 1, 1943 (age 82); Little Rock, Arkansas, U.S.
- Batted: Right Threw: Right

MLB debut
- September 10, 1968, for the Chicago White Sox

Last MLB appearance
- September 28, 1969, for the Chicago White Sox

MLB statistics
- Win–loss record: 0–2
- Earned run average: 4.70
- Strikeouts: 7
- Stats at Baseball Reference

Teams
- Chicago White Sox (1968–1969)

Frederick Helsher Rath Sr. (born September 1, 1943) is an American former Major League Baseball pitcher who appeared in 8 games for the Chicago White Sox during the 1968 and 1969 seasons. He threw right-handed.

Rath, who attended Baylor University, was drafted by the White Sox in the 4th round of the 1965 amateur draft and made his major league debut 3 years later. Following the 1970 season he was traded to the California Angels for John Purdin, but never appeared in a major league game again.

Rath's son, Fred Rath Jr., also had a brief major league career, appearing in two games for the Colorado Rockies in 1998.
