= Algodoneros de San Luis =

Mexican pro baseball team

- Logo

Information
- League: Liga Norte de México
- Location: San Luis Río Colorado, Sonora
- Ballpark: Estadio Andrés Mena Montijo
- Founded: 1945
- League championships: 3 (2013, 2014, 2019)
- Colors: Black, red and white
- President: Francisco Ochoa Montaño
- Website: www.algodonerosdesanluis.com.mx

Algodoneros de San Luis (English: San Luis Cotton Growers) are a Mexican professional baseball team based in San Luis Río Colorado, Sonora. They play as a member of the Liga Norte de México (LNM), a minor league organized farm system in Mexico and play their home games at Estadio Andrés Mena Montijo.

The Algodoneros are one of the most successful teams in the league, having won three LNM titles in 2013, 2014 and 2019.

== History ==
=== Early history ===
Algodoneros de San Luis was established as an amateur baseball club in 1945. They later joined the Liga Norte de Sonora and briefly changed their name to Soles de San Luis (San Luis Suns), but quickly returned to their original nickname. The Algodoneros played in the Liga Norte de Sonora until 2011, when the league split. During this time, the team won five league championships in 1988, 2000, 2002 and 2003.

=== Liga Norte de México (2012–present) ===
In January 2012, the Liga Norte de Sonora split into two leagues and the Algodoneros joined the newly created Liga Norte de México (LNM). The team won LNM titles in 2013, 2014, and most recently in 2019. Since 2022, the club is affiliated with the Sultanes de Monterrey of the Mexican League. The team did not play during 2023 and 2024 due to the cancellation of the 2023 and 2024 LNM seasons.

== Championships ==
Season	Manager	Opponent	Series score	Record
2013	Alonso Téllez	Toros de Tijuana	4–3	50–42
2014	Marco Antonio Guzmán	Freseros de San Quintín	4–2	59–32
2019	Héctor García	Rojos de Caborca	4–1	41–28
Total championships			3	
