= Mexican Northern League =

Mexican professional baseball league

Liga Norte de Mexico
- Sport: Baseball
- Founded: 2012; 14 years ago
- Director: José Luis Rodríguez Escoto
- No. of teams: 7
- Country: Mexico
- Continent: North America
- Most recent champions: Marineros de Ensenada (4th title)
- Most titles: Marineros de Ensenada (4 titles)
- Broadcasters: AYM Sports iTV Deportes; Latin American Sports
- Website: liganortedemexico.net

The Liga Norte de México (LNM) (English: Northern League of México) is a professional baseball minor league based in northwest Mexico, with seven teams in the states of Sonora, Baja California, and Baja California Sur. Formerly known as Liga Norte de Sonora from 1968 to 1969, it acts as a feeder league for the Mexican League in the summer. It has been suspended since 2023.

== Teams ==
Current Liga Norte de México team locations

| Team | City | Stadium | Capacity | Founded |
|---|---|---|---|---|
| Algodoneros de San Luis | San Luis Río Colorado, Sonora | Estadio Andrés Mena Montijo | 2,500 | 1945 |
| Bucaneros de Los Cabos | Cabo San Lucas, Baja California Sur | Estadio Leonardo Gastélum | TBA | 2022 |
| Delfines de La Paz | La Paz, Baja California Sur | Estadio Arturo C. Nahl | 3,800 | 2019 |
| Freseros de San Quintín | San Quintín, Baja California | Estadio Dr. Miguel Valdez Salazar | 2,200 | 2013 |
| Industriales de Otay | Otay Centenario, Tijuana, Baja California | Estadio Ángel Camarena | TBD | 2020 |
| Marineros de Ensenada | Ensenada, Baja California | Deportivo Antonio Palacios | 5,000 | 2010 |
| Tiburones de Puerto Peñasco | Puerto Peñasco, Sonora | Estadio Francisco León García | 3,500 | 1974 |

== Champions ==
| Season | Winner | Runner-up | Result |
|---|---|---|---|
| 2012 | Marineros de Ensenada | Tiburones de Puerto Peñasco | 4–2 |
| 2013 | Algodoneros de San Luis | Toros de Tijuana | 4–3 |
| 2014 | Algodoneros de San Luis | Freseros de San Quintín | 4–2 |
| 2015 | Centinelas de Mexicali | Toritos de Tijuana | 4–3 |
| 2016 | Freseros de San Quintín | Algodoneros de San Luis | 4–3 |
| 2017 | Marineros de Ensenada | Algodoneros de San Luis | 4–3 |
| 2018 | Marineros de Ensenada | Freseros de San Quintín | 4–2 |
| 2019 | Algodoneros de San Luis | Rojos de Caborca | 4–1 |
| 2020 | Season cancelled due to COVID-19 pandemic | | |
| 2021 | Season cancelled due to COVID-19 pandemic | | |
| 2022 | Marineros de Ensenada | Freseros de San Quintín | 4–1 |

== Liga Norte de México Championships by team ==
| Rank | Team | Wins | Years |
|---|---|---|---|
| 1 | Marineros de Ensenada | 4 | 2012, 2017, 2018, 2022 |
| 2 | Algodoneros de San Luis | 3 | 2013, 2014, 2019 |
| 3 | Freseros de San Quintín | 1 | 2016 |
| 3 | Centinelas de Mexicali | 1 | 2015 |
