= Mayos de Navojoa =

Baseball team in the Mexican Pacific League

- Logo

Information
- League: Mexican Pacific League
- Location: Navojoa, Sonora
- Ballpark: Estadio Manuel "Ciclón" Echeverría
- Founded: 1959
- League championships: 2 (1979, 2000)
- Colors: Red, dark blue and white
- Ownership: Promociones Deportivas del Mayo, S.A. de C.V
- Manager: Miguel Tejada

The Mayos de Navojoa (English: Navojoa Mayos) are a professional baseball team in the Mexican Pacific League (LMP), based in Navojoa, Sonora. Founded in 1959, the franchise relocated to Tucson, Arizona before the 2025–26 season, and became the first team in the LMP to be based in the United States; however, after just one season, they returned to Navojoa.

The Mayos have won the Mexican Pacific League championship twice. The first time was in the 1978–79 season, with Chuck Goggin as manager and with Rickey Henderson on the roster. The next time was in the 1999–2000 season, with Lorenzo Bundy as manager. In both championship series, the Mayos defeated the Naranjeros de Hermosillo, winning 4–2 in 1979 and sweeping the series 4–0 in 2000.

== Championships ==
Season	Manager	Opponent	Series score	Record
1978–79	Chuck Goggin	Naranjeros de Hermosillo	4–2	56–41
1999–00	Lorenzo Bundy	Naranjeros de Hermosillo	4–0	51–32–1
Total championships			1	

== Caribbean Series record ==
Year	Venue	Finish	Wins	Losses	Win%	Manager
1979	(Puerto Rico) San Juan	4th	1	5	.167	(United States) Chuck Goggin
2000	(Dominican Republic) Santo Domingo	3rd	1	5	.167	(United States) Lorenzo Bundy
Total			2	10	.167	

== Famous players ==
=== Pitchers ===
- Manuel "Ciclón" Echeverría
- Jeff Fassero
- Bob Greenwood
- Mike Hampton
- Dyar Miller
- Ángel Moreno
- Randy Niemann
- José Peña
- Enrique Romo
- Fernando Valenzuela
- Héctor Velázquez

=== Infielders ===
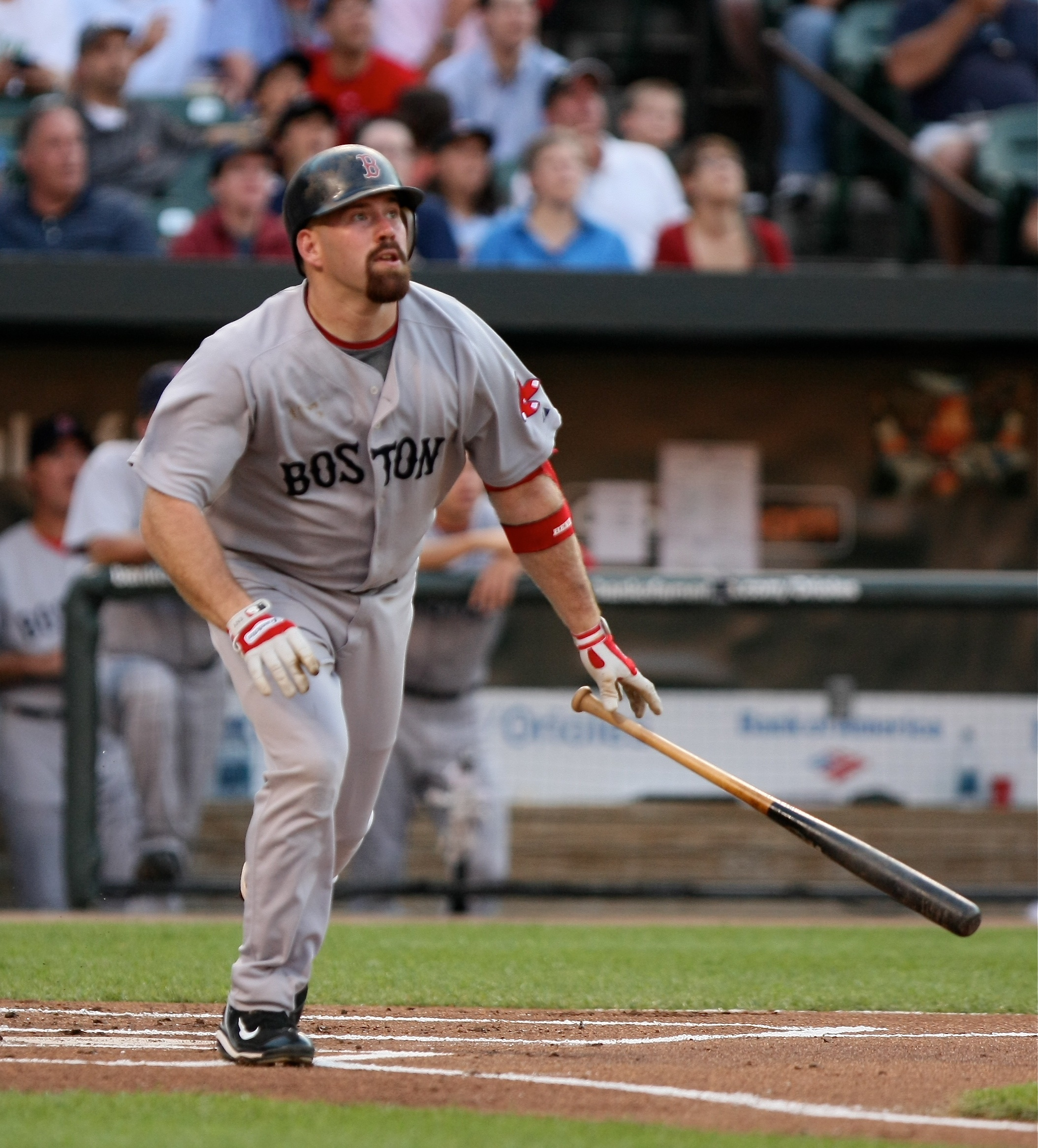
Kevin Youkilis

- Morgan Burkhart
- Juan Gabriel Castro
- Archi Cianfrocco
- Luis Alfonso Cruz
- Ramón "Abulón" Hernández
- Whitey Herzog
- Aaron Holbert
- Mario Mendoza
- Kevin Millar
- Troy Neel
- Jorge Orta
- Óscar Robles
- Scott Thorman
- Kevin Youkilis
- Freddy Sanchez

=== Outfielders ===
- Randy Arozarena
- Ryan Christenson
- Rickey Henderson
- Brandon Jones
- Trot Nixon
- Curtis Pride
- Matt Stairs
- Matt Young (outfielder)
