= 2025–26 Mexican Pacific League season =

- League: Mexican Pacific League
- Sport: Baseball
- Duration: 15 October 2025 – 25 January 2026
- Games: 213
- Teams: 10
- Season champions: Charros de Jalisco

LMP seasons
- ← 2024–25 2026–27 →

The 2025–26 Mexican Pacific League season was the 68th season in the history of the Mexican Pacific League (LMP). It was contested by ten teams. Charros de Jalisco won their fourth championship and second consecutive title, sweeping Tomateros de Culiacán four games to none in a rematch of the previous season's championship series, led by manager Benji Gil.

A new team joined the league: the Jaguares de Nayarit replaced the Sultanes de Monterrey, whose franchise was sold and relocated to Tepic, Nayarit under the ownership of Carlos Peralta in April 2025. The league officially announced the Jaguares' entry for the 2025–26 season on 20 May 2025. The Mayos de Navojoa also relocated to Tucson, Arizona, where they played as the Tucson Baseball Team.

== Standings ==
=== First half ===
First half standings
Rank	Team	W	L	Pct.	GB	Pts.
1	Yaquis de Obregón	22	13	.629	—	10
2	Cañeros de Los Mochis	21	14	.600	1.0	9
3	Jaguares de Nayarit	20	15	.571	2.0	8
4	Naranjeros de Hermosillo	20	15	.571	2.0	7
5	Charros de Jalisco	20	15	.571	2.0	6
6	Águilas de Mexicali	18	17	.514	4.0	5.5
7	Tomateros de Culiacán	18	17	.514	4.0	5
8	Tucson Baseball Team	13	22	.371	9.0	4.5
9	Venados de Mazatlán	12	23	.343	10.0	4
10	Algodoneros de Guasave	11	24	.314	11.0	3.5

=== Second half ===
Second half standings
Rank	Team	W	L	Pct.	GB	Pts.
1	Tomateros de Culiacán	22	11	.667	—	10
2	Naranjeros de Hermosillo	20	13	.606	2.0	9
3	Jaguares de Nayarit	20	13	.606	2.0	8
4	Charros de Jalisco	18	15	.545	4.0	7
5	Yaquis de Obregón	18	15	.545	4.0	6
6	Cañeros de Los Mochis	17	16	.515	5.0	5.5
7	Algodoneros de Guasave	15	18	.455	7.0	5
8	Águilas de Mexicali	15	18	.455	7.0	4.5
9	Tucson Baseball Team	10	23	.303	12.0	4
10	Venados de Mazatlán	10	23	.303	12.0	3.5

=== General ===
General standings
Rank	Team	W	L	Pct.	GB	Pts.
1	Jaguares de Nayarit	40	28	.588	–	16
2	Yaquis de Obregón	40	28	.588	–	16
3	Naranjeros de Hermosillo	40	28	.588	–	16
4	Tomateros de Culiacán	40	28	.588	–	15
5	Cañeros de Los Mochis	38	30	.559	2.0	14.5
6	Charros de Jalisco	38	30	.559	2.0	13
7	Águilas de Mexicali	33	35	.485	7.0	10
8	Algodoneros de Guasave	26	32	.448	14.0	8.5
9	Tucson Baseball Team	23	45	.338	17.0	8.5
10	Venados de Mazatlán	22	46	.324	18.0	7.5

== Postseason ==
First round
4	Culiacán	4
5	Los Mochis	3
1	Nayarit	1
8	Guasave	4
3	Hermosillo	2
6	Jalisco	4
2	Obregón	0
7	Mexicali	4

Semifinals
4	Culiacán	4
8	Guasave	0
6	Jalisco	4
7	Mexicali	1

Finals
4	Culiacán	0
6	Jalisco	4

== Managerial changes ==
=== Off season ===
Team	Former manager	Reason for leaving	New manager	Ref.
Águilas de Mexicali	(Mexico) Luis Carlos Rivera	Resigned	(Mexico) Óscar Robles	
Algodoneros de Guasave	(Colombia) Jolbert Cabrera	Fired	(Venezuela) José Moreno	
Yaquis de Obregón	(Mexico) Miguel Ojeda	Resigned	(Mexico) Gabe Alvarez	

=== In season ===
Team	Former manager	Interim manager	Reason for leaving	New manager	Ref.
Águilas de Mexicali	(Mexico) Óscar Robles	(United States) Bronswell Patrick	Fired	(United States) Pat Listach	
Águilas de Mexicali	(United States) Pat Listach	N/A	Fired	(Mexico) Roberto Vizcarra	
Algodoneros de Guasave	(Venezuela) José Moreno	(Mexico) Ramón Orantes	Fired	(Mexico) Óscar Robles	
Cañeros de Los Mochis	(Dominican Republic) Félix Fermín	N/A	Fired	(United States) Chris Coste	
Tomateros de Culiacán	(Mexico) Roberto Vizcarra	N/A	Fired	(United States) Lorenzo Bundy	
Tucson Baseball Team	(Venezuela) Willie Romero	N/A	Fired	(Mexico) Matías Carrillo	
Venados de Mazatlán	(Mexico) Juan José Pacho	N/A	Fired	(United States) Gerry Álvarez	

== League leaders ==
Batting leaders
Stat	Player	Team	Total
AVG	(United States) Eric Filia	Los Mochis	.363
HR	(Mexico) Leo Heras	Guasave	14
RBI	(Mexico) Julián Ornelas	Culiacán	60
R	(Cuba) J. P. Martínez	Culiacán	61
H	(Cuba) Orlando Martínez	Culiacán	83
SB	(Cuba) J. P. Martínez	Culiacán	25

Pitching leaders
Stat	Player	Team	Total
ERA	(Mexico) Darel Torres	Los Mochis	2.13
W	5 tied with (Note: Alex Delgado, Odrisamer Despaigne, Alemao Hernández, Wilmer Ríos, Jared Wetherbee)		7
SV	(Mexico) Efraín Contreras	Obregón	15
IP	(Mexico) David Reyes	Mexicali	81.0
K	(Mexico) Darel Torres	Los Mochis	62

== Awards ==
The following individuals received awards at the end of the season.

Award	Player	Team	Ref.
Manager of the Year	(Mexico) Luis Carlos Rivera	Nayarit	
Most Valuable Player	(Mexico) Leo Heras	Guasave	
Pitcher of the Year	(Mexico) Darel Torres	Los Mochis	
Rookie of the Year	(Mexico) Ángel Ramírez	Hermosillo	
Reliever of the Year	(United States) Matt Foster	Hermosillo	
