= 2024–25 Mexican Pacific League season =

- League: Mexican Pacific League
- Sport: Baseball
- Duration: 11 October 2024 – 28 January 2025
- Games: 213
- Teams: 10
- Season champions: Charros de Jalisco

LMP seasons
- ← 2023–24 2025–26 →

The 2024–25 Mexican Pacific League season was the 67th season in the history of the Mexican Pacific League (LMP). It was contested by ten teams. Charros de Jalisco won their third championship, defeating Tomateros de Culiacán 4–2 in the final series, led by manager Benji Gil.

Naranjeros pitcher Robert Stock won the Pitching Triple Crown, leading the league with a 1.60 ERA, 10 wins, and 78 strikeouts, becoming the first Naranjeros player to do so and the sixth pitcher in the history of the league.

== Standings ==
=== First half ===
First half standings
Rank	Team	W	L	Pct.	GB	Pts.
1	Tomateros de Culiacán	25	10	.714	—	10
2	Cañeros de Los Mochis	20	15	.571	5.0	9
3	Naranjeros de Hermosillo	19	16	.543	6.0	8
4	Algodoneros de Guasave	18	17	.514	7.0	7
5	Charros de Jalisco	17	18	.486	8.0	6
6	Águilas de Mexicali	16	18	.471	8.5	5.5
7	Yaquis de Obregón	16	18	.471	8.5	5
8	Mayos de Navojoa	16	19	.457	9.0	4.5
9	Venados de Mazatlán	15	20	.429	10.0	4
10	Sultanes de Monterrey	12	23	.343	13.0	3.5

=== Second half ===
Second half standings
Rank	Team	W	L	Pct.	GB	Pts.
1	Naranjeros de Hermosillo	23	10	.697	—	10
2	Charros de Jalisco	20	13	.606	3.0	9
3	Tomateros de Culiacán	18	15	.545	5.0	8
4	Águilas de Mexicali	18	15	.545	5.0	7
5	Cañeros de Los Mochis	17	16	.515	6.0	6
6	Algodoneros de Guasave	17	16	.515	6.0	5.5
7	Yaquis de Obregón	16	17	.485	7.0	5
8	Venados de Mazatlán	15	18	.455	8.0	4.5
9	Sultanes de Monterrey	12	21	.364	11.0	4
10	Mayos de Navojoa	9	24	.273	14.0	3.5

=== General ===
General standings
Rank	Team	W	L	Pct.	GB	Pts.
1	Tomateros de Culiacán	43	25	.632	—	18
2	Naranjeros de Hermosillo	42	26	.618	1.0	18
3	Charros de Jalisco	37	31	.544	6.0	17
4	Cañeros de Los Mochis	37	31	.544	6.0	15
5	Algodoneros de Guasave	35	33	.515	8.0	12.5
6	Águilas de Mexicali	34	33	.507	8.5	12.5
7	Yaquis de Obregón	32	35	.478	10.5	10
8	Venados de Mazatlán	30	38	.441	13.0	8.5
9	Mayos de Navojoa	25	43	.368	18.0	8
10	Sultanes de Monterrey	24	44	.353	19.0	7.5

== Postseason ==
First round
1	Culiacán	4
8	Mazatlán	1
4	Los Mochis	4
5	Guasave	3
2	Hermosillo	4
7	Obregón	2
3	Jalisco	4
6	Mexicali	1

Semifinals
1	Culiacán	4
4	Los Mochis	2
2	Hermosillo	1
3	Jalisco	4

Finals
1	Culiacán	2
3	Jalisco	4

== Managerial changes ==
=== Off season ===
Team	Former manager	Reason for leaving	New manager	Ref.
Algodoneros de Guasave	(Mexico) Óscar Robles	Resigned	(Colombia) Jolbert Cabrera	
Mayos de Navojoa	(Mexico) Matías Carrillo	Fired	(United States) Gerardo Álvarez	
Tomateros de Culiacán	(Mexico) Alfredo Amézaga	Fired	(Mexico) Óscar Robles	
Yaquis de Obregón	(Mexico) Sergio Omar Gastélum	Reassigned	(Dominican Republic) Lino Rivera	

=== In season ===
Team	Former manager	Interim manager	Reason for leaving	New manager	Ref.
Águilas de Mexicali	(Mexico) Roberto Vizcarra	N/A	Fired	(Mexico) Luis Carlos Rivera	
Sultanes de Monterrey	(Mexico) Vinicio Castilla	(Mexico) Erick Rodríguez	Resigned	(Puerto Rico) Robinson Cancel	
Tomateros de Culiacán	(Mexico) Óscar Robles	N/A	Fired	(Mexico) Roberto Vizcarra	
Venados de Mazatlán	(Mexico) Luis Carlos Rivera	N/A	Fired	(Mexico) Juan José Pacho	
Yaquis de Obregón	(Dominican Republic) Lino Rivera	(Mexico) Tavo Álvarez	Fired	(Mexico) Miguel Ojeda	

== League leaders ==
Batting leaders
Stat	Player	Team	Total
AVG	(Mexico) Jasson Atondo	Hermosillo	.355
HR	(Cuba) Yasmany Tomás	Los Mochis	13
RBI	(Mexico) Joey Meneses	Culiacán	58
R	(United States) Billy Hamilton	Jalisco	49
H	(Mexico) Jasson Atondo	Hermosillo	77
H	(United States) Eric Filia	Los Mochis	77
SB	(United States) Billy Hamilton	Jalisco	38

Pitching leaders
Stat	Player	Team	Total
ERA	(United States) Robert Stock	Hermosillo	1.60
W	(United States) Robert Stock	Hermosillo	10
W	(Mexico) Darel Torres	Los Mochis	10
SV	(United States) Stephen Nogosek	Culiacán	18
SV	(Mexico) Jake Sanchez	Mexicali	18
IP	(Mexico) David Reyes	Mexicali	87.0
K	(United States) Robert Stock	Hermosillo	78

== Awards ==
The following individuals received awards at the end of the season.

Award	Player	Team	Ref.
Manager of the Year	(Mexico) Benji Gil	Jalisco	
Most Valuable Player	(Mexico) Joey Meneses	Culiacán	
Pitcher of the Year	(United States) Robert Stock	Hermosillo	
Rookie of the Year	(Mexico) Luis Gastélum	Los Mochis	
Reliever of the Year	(United States) Stephen Nogosek	Culiacán	
