= 2021 Mexican Baseball League season =

2021 Mexican League season
- League: Mexican League
- Sport: Baseball
- Duration: 20 May – 15 September
- Teams: 18

Serie del Rey
- Champions: Toros de Tijuana
- Runners-up: Leones de Yucatán
- Finals MVP: Efrén Navarro

LMB seasons
- ← 2019 2022 →

The 2021 Mexican League season was the 96th season in the history of the Mexican League. The league was contested by 18 teams, evenly divided in North and South zones. The season started on 20 May with the series between Sultanes de Monterrey and Acereros de Monclova and ended on 15 September with the last game of the Serie del Rey, where Toros de Tijuana defeated Leones de Yucatán to win the championship.

Two teams joined the league for this season: Mariachis de Guadalajara and El Águila de Veracruz, totalling 18 teams. Veracruz returned to the league after a three year absence, when in 2018 the franchise was sold and moved to Nuevo Laredo.

Starting from this season, there were four rounds of playoffs to define the champion. Previously, the Mexican League had three rounds of playoffs.

== Standings ==
North
Rank	Team	W	L	Pct.	GB	STK
1	Mariachis de Guadalajara	46	17	.730	–	W1
2	Toros de Tijuana	40	25	.615	7.0	L1
3	Saraperos de Saltillo	36	30	.545	11.5	L1
4	Acereros de Monclova	35	31	.530	12.5	L6
5	Rieleros de Aguascalientes	30	31	.492	15.0	W2
6	Algodoneros de Unión Laguna	31	33	.484	15.5	W3
7	Sultanes de Monterrey	30	33	.476	16.0	W5
8	Tecolotes de los Dos Laredos	30	36	.455	17.5	W1
9	Generales de Durango	20	45	.308	27.0	L5

South
Rank	Team	W	L	Pct.	GB	STK
1	Diablos Rojos del México	41	23	.641	—	W2
2	Olmecas de Tabasco	36	30	.545	6.0	W1
3	Leones de Yucatán	34	30	.531	7.0	L1
4	El Águila de Veracruz	34	31	.523	7.5	W2
5	Pericos de Puebla	31	31	.500	9.0	W3
6	Tigres de Quintana Roo	32	33	.492	9.5	L3
7	Bravos de León	29	37	.439	13.0	L2
8	Piratas de Campeche	24	39	.381	16.5	L2
9	Guerreros de Oaxaca	20	45	.308	21.5	L12

== Postseason ==
First round
North
Mariachis de Guadalajara	4
Algodoneros de Unión Laguna	3
Toros de Tijuana	4
Rieleros de Aguascalientes	3
Saraperos de Saltillo	1
Acereros de Monclova	4
South
Diablos Rojos del México	4
Tigres de Quintana Roo	1
Olmecas de Tabasco	4
Pericos de Puebla	1
Leones de Yucatán	4
El Águila de Veracruz	2

Zone Series
Mariachis de Guadalajara	4
Rieleros de Aguascalientes	2
Toros de Tijuana	4
Acereros de Monclova	1
Diablos Rojos del México	4
El Águila de Veracruz	1
Olmecas de Tabasco	1
Leones de Yucatán	4

Championship Series
Mariachis de Guadalajara	2
Toros de Tijuana	4
Diablos Rojos del México	1
Leones de Yucatán	4

Serie del Rey
Toros de Tijuana	4
Leones de Yucatán	3

=== First round ===
Mariachis de Guadalajara won the series, 4–3.

Game	Date	Score	Location	Time	Attendance
1	August 7	Unión Laguna – 4, Guadalajara – 13	Estadio Panamericano	3:36	3,099
2	August 8	Unión Laguna – 3, Guadalajara – 7	Estadio Panamericano	3:32	2,863
3	August 10	Guadalajara – 12, Unión Laguna – 3	Estadio Revolución	3:51	5,747
4	August 11	Guadalajara – 2, Unión Laguna – 10	Estadio Revolución	3:54	4,825
5	August 12	Guadalajara – 4, Unión Laguna – 5	Estadio Revolución	3:34	5,023
6	August 14	Unión Laguna – 13, Guadalajara – 11	Estadio Panamericano	4:43	3,321
7	August 15	Unión Laguna – 2, Guadalajara – 7	Estadio Panamericano	3:40	2,299

Toros de Tijuana won the series, 4–3.

Game	Date	Score	Location	Time	Attendance
1	August 7	Aguascalientes – 6, Tijuana – 1	Estadio Chevron	3:00	7,101
2	August 8	Aguascalientes – 4, Tijuana – 8	Estadio Chevron	3:21	6,031
3	August 10	Tijuana – 5, Aguascalientes – 6	Parque Alberto Romo Chávez	3:46	3,489
4	August 11	Tijuana – 4, Aguascalientes – 5	Parque Alberto Romo Chávez	3:53	3,233
5	August 12	Tijuana – 5, Aguascalientes – 0	Parque Alberto Romo Chávez	3:00	2,784
6	August 14	Aguascalientes – 4, Tijuana – 5	Estadio Chevron	4:32	11,986
7	August 15	Aguascalientes – 4, Tijuana – 6	Estadio Chevron	3:47	12,021

Acereros de Monclova won the series, 4–1.

Game	Date	Score	Location	Time	Attendance
1	August 7	Monclova – 5, Saltillo – 4	Estadio de Béisbol Francisco I. Madero	3:43	5,162
2	August 8	Monclova – 2, Saltillo – 4	Estadio de Béisbol Francisco I. Madero	3:02	5,780
3	August 10	Saltillo – 3, Monclova – 6	Estadio de Béisbol Monclova	3:41	5,366
4	August 11	Saltillo – 2, Monclova – 3	Estadio de Béisbol Monclova	3:11	5,413
5	August 12	Saltillo – 1, Monclova – 3 (10 inn.)	Estadio de Béisbol Monclova	3:14	5,942

Diablos Rojos del México won the series, 4–1.

Game	Date	Score	Location	Time	Attendance
1	August 7	Quintana Roo – 12, México – 2	Estadio Alfredo Harp Helú	3:26	5,276
2	August 8	Quintana Roo – 5, México – 7	Estadio Alfredo Harp Helú	3:27	6,195
3	August 10	México – 9, Quintana Roo – 0	Parque Kukulcán Alamo	3:06	2,227
4	August 11	México – 3, Quintana Roo – 0	Parque Kukulcán Alamo	3:26	1,928
5	August 12	México – 8, Quintana Roo – 4	Parque Kukulcán Alamo	3:46	1,521

Olmecas de Tabasco won the series, 4–1.

Game	Date	Score	Location	Time	Attendance
1	August 7	Puebla – 2, Tabasco – 1	Estadio Centenario 27 de Febrero	4:07	2,236
2	August 8	Puebla – 1, Tabasco – 3	Estadio Centenario 27 de Febrero	3:04	2,370
3	August 10	Tabasco – 14, Puebla – 12	Estadio Hermanos Serdán	3:43	2,230
4	August 11	Tabasco – 8, Puebla – 3	Estadio Hermanos Serdán	3:55	2,432
5	August 12	Tabasco – 7, Puebla – 4	Estadio Hermanos Serdán	3:28	2,133

Leones de Yucatán won the series, 4–2.

Game	Date	Score	Location	Time	Attendance
1	August 7	Veracruz – 3, Yucatán – 15	Parque Kukulcán Alamo	3:36	3,476
2	August 8	Veracruz – 8, Yucatán – 3	Parque Kukulcán Alamo	3:47	3,889
3	August 10	Yucatán – 7, Veracruz – 6	Estadio Universitario Beto Ávila	4:05	2,180
4	August 11	Yucatán – 11, Veracruz – 3	Estadio Universitario Beto Ávila	3:54	2,043
5	August 12	Yucatán – 8, Veracruz – 9	Estadio Universitario Beto Ávila	4:22	1,789
6	August 14	Veracruz – 1, Yucatán – 5	Parque Kukulcán Alamo	2:51	4,108

=== Zone Series ===
Mariachis de Guadalajara won the series, 4–2.

Game	Date	Score	Location	Time	Attendance
1	August 17	Aguascalientes – 7, Guadalajara – 14	Estadio Panamericano	4:05	2,315
2	August 18	Aguascalientes – 7, Guadalajara – 8	Estadio Panamericano	4:18	2,672
3	August 20	Guadalajara – 9, Aguascalientes – 6	Parque Alberto Romo Chávez	4:17	4,350
4	August 21	Guadalajara – 7, Aguascalientes – 9	Parque Alberto Romo Chávez	3:45	1,915
5	August 22	Guadalajara – 6, Aguascalientes – 9	Parque Alberto Romo Chávez	3:27	1,755
6	August 24	Aguascalientes – 3, Guadalajara – 10	Estadio Panamericano	4:18	3,419

Toros de Tijuana won the series, 4–1.

Game	Date	Score	Location	Time	Attendance
1	August 17	Monclova – 5, Tijuana – 10	Estadio Chevron	3:57	8,827
2	August 18	Monclova – 3, Tijuana – 4	Estadio Chevron	3:16	9,073
3	August 20	Tijuana – 5, Monclova – 4	Estadio de Béisbol Monclova	3:41	5,950
4	August 21	Tijuana – 3, Monclova – 5	Estadio de Béisbol Monclova	3:17	5,950
5	August 22	Tijuana – 10, Monclova – 3	Estadio de Béisbol Monclova	3:40	5,850

Diablos Rojos del México won the series, 4–1.

Game	Date	Score	Location	Time	Attendance
1	August 17	Veracruz – 3, México – 9	Estadio Alfredo Harp Helú	3:33	4,105
2	August 18	Veracruz – 9, México – 14	Estadio Alfredo Harp Helú	4:12	5,658
3	August 21	México – 2, Veracruz – 0	Estadio Universitario Beto Ávila	3:26	2,579
4	August 22	México – 0, Veracruz – 3	Estadio Universitario Beto Ávila	2:47	1,703
5	August 23	México – 5, Veracruz – 2	Estadio Universitario Beto Ávila	3:21	3,000

Leones de Yucatán won the series, 4–1.

Game	Date	Score	Location	Time	Attendance
1	August 17	Yucatán – 6, Tabasco – 7	Estadio Centenario 27 de Febrero	4:27	1,613
2	August 18	Yucatán – 3, Tabasco – 0	Estadio Centenario 27 de Febrero	3:24	1,655
3	August 20	Tabasco – 2, Yucatán – 4	Parque Kukulcán Alamo	4:53	4,467
4	August 21	Tabasco – 1, Yucatán – 5	Parque Kukulcán Alamo	3:02	5,238
5	August 22	Tabasco – 0, Yucatán – 3	Parque Kukulcán Alamo	3:07	5,683

=== Championship Series ===
Toros de Tijuana won the series, 4–2.

Game	Date	Score	Location	Time	Attendance
1	August 27	Tijuana – 4, Guadalajara – 3	Estadio Panamericano	3:56	4,438
2	August 28	Tijuana – 11, Guadalajara – 9	Estadio Panamericano	4:59	4,384
3	August 30	Guadalajara – 4, Tijuana – 3	Estadio Chevron	4:02	14,896
4	August 31	Guadalajara – 3, Tijuana – 7	Estadio Chevron	3:02	14,921
5	September 1	Guadalajara – 12, Tijuana – 5	Estadio Chevron	3:35	14,902
6	September 3	Tijuana – 5, Guadalajara – 4	Estadio Panamericano	3:02	4,000

Leones de Yucatán won the series, 4–1.

Game	Date	Score	Location	Time	Attendance
1	August 27	Yucatán – 7, México – 6	Estadio Alfredo Harp Helú	3:45	8,426
2	August 28	Yucatán – 6, México – 4	Estadio Alfredo Harp Helú	3:40	8,746
3	August 30	México – 3, Yucatán – 5	Parque Kukulcán Alamo	2:58	6,460
4	August 31	México – 6, Yucatán – 4	Parque Kukulcán Alamo	3:35	6,460
5	September 1	México – 7, Yucatán – 9	Parque Kukulcán Alamo	4:20	6,460

=== Serie del Rey ===
==== Summary ====
Toros de Tijuana won the series, 4–3.

Game	Date	Score	Location	Time	Attendance
1	September 6	Yucatán – 7, Tijuana – 3	Estadio Chevron	3:39	14,297
2	September 7	Yucatán – 7, Tijuana – 1	Estadio Chevron	3:17	14,989
3	September 9	Tijuana – 0, Yucatán – 2	Parque Kukulcán Alamo	2:48	6,460
4	September 11	Tijuana – 6, Yucatán – 2	Parque Kukulcán Alamo	3:34	6,460
5	September 12	Tijuana – 4, Yucatán – 3 (11 inn.)	Parque Kukulcán Alamo	5:02	6,460
6	September 14	Yucatán – 3, Tijuana – 10	Estadio Chevron	3:27	16,998
7	September 15	Yucatán – 0, Tijuana – 3	Estadio Chevron	3:33	17,687

==== Game summaries ====
===== Game 1 =====
6 September 2021 7:22 p.m. (UTC–7) at Estadio Chevron in Tijuana, Baja California, 23 °C, clear
Team	1	2	3	4	5	6	7	8	9	R	H	E
Yucatán	0	0	1	0	2	0	4	0	0	7	9	2
Tijuana	0	0	0	0	2	0	1	0	0	3	9	0
WP: Radhames Liz (1–0) LP: Mike Devine (0–1); Home runs: YUC: Sebastián Valle (1); TIJ: None; Attendance: 14,297; Boxscore

===== Game 2 =====
7 September 2021 7:06 p.m. (UTC–7) at Estadio Chevron in Tijuana, Baja California, 23 °C
Team	1	2	3	4	5	6	7	8	9	R	H	E
Yucatán	0	0	0	0	5	0	2	0	0	7	10	0
Tijuana	1	0	0	0	0	0	0	0	0	1	7	1
WP: Yoanner Negrín (1–0) LP: Carlos Hernández (0–1); Home runs: YUC: Yadir Drake (1); TIJ: None; Attendance: 14,989; Boxscore

===== Game 3 =====
9 September 2021 8:16 p.m. (UTC–5) at Parque Kukulcán Alamo in Mérida, Yucatán, 26 °C, partly cloudy
Team	1	2	3	4	5	6	7	8	9	R	H	E
Tijuana	0	0	0	0	0	0	0	0	0	0	6	0
Yucatán	2	0	0	0	0	0	0	0	X	2	5	0
WP: Jake Thompson (1–0) LP: Joe Van Meter (0–1) Sv: Josh Lueke (1); Attendance: 6,460; Boxscore

===== Game 4 =====
11 September 2021 6:01 p.m. (UTC–5) at Parque Kukulcán Alamo in Mérida, Yucatán, 29 °C, partly cloudy
Team	1	2	3	4	5	6	7	8	9	R	H	E
Tijuana	0	0	1	2	2	1	0	0	0	6	14	1
Yucatán	2	0	0	0	0	0	0	0	X	2	5	0
WP: Teddy Stankiewicz (1–0) LP: Casey Harman (0–1); Home runs: TIJ: Efrén Navarro (1); YUC: None; Attendance: 6,460; Boxscore

===== Game 5 =====
12 September 2021 6:01 p.m. (UTC–5) at Parque Kukulcán Alamo in Mérida, Yucatán, 33 °C, partly cloudy
Team	1	2	3	4	5	6	7	8	9	10	11	R	H	E
Tijuana	2	1	0	0	0	0	0	0	0	0	1	4	7	2
Yucatán	0	1	0	0	1	0	0	0	1	0	0	3	7	2
WP: Fernando Rodney (1–0) LP: Manuel Chávez (0–1); Home runs: TIJ: Leandro Castro (1), Luis Cruz (1); YUC: None; Attendance: 6,460; Boxscore

===== Game 6 =====
14 September 2021 7:05 p.m. (UTC–7) at Estadio Chevron in Tijuana, Baja California, 23 °C, clear
Team	1	2	3	4	5	6	7	8	9	R	H	E
Yucatán	0	0	2	0	1	0	0	0	0	3	7	1
Tijuana	0	0	0	5	3	0	2	0	X	10	12	0
WP: Michael Tonkin (1–0) LP: Yoanner Negrín (1–1); Home runs: YUC: None; TIJ: Luis Cruz (1); Attendance: 16,998; Boxscore

===== Game 7 =====
15 September 2021 7:04 p.m. (UTC–7) at Estadio Chevron in Tijuana, Baja California, 21 °C, clear
Team	1	2	3	4	5	6	7	8	9	R	H	E
Yucatán	0	0	0	0	0	0	0	0	0	0	3	2
Tijuana	0	0	1	0	1	0	1	0	X	3	10	1
WP: Teddy Stankiewicz (2–0) LP: Jake Thompson (1–1) Sv: Fernando Rodney (1); Home runs: YUC: None; TIJ: Peter O'Brien (1); Attendance: 17,687; Boxscore

== Managerial changes ==
=== Offseason ===
Team	Former manager	Reason for leaving	New manager	Ref.
Diablos Rojos del México	(Mexico) Sergio Omar Gastélum	Fired	(Mexico) Miguel Ojeda	

=== In season ===
Team	Former manager	Interim manager	Reason for leaving	New manager	Ref.
Sultanes de Monterrey	(Mexico) Homar Rojas	(Mexico) Antonio Aguilera	Fired	(Mexico) Sergio Omar Gastélum	
Tecolotes de los Dos Laredos	(Mexico) Pablo Ortega	N/A	Fired	(Dominican Republic) Rafael Rijo	
Tigres de Quintana Roo	(Mexico) Adán Muñoz	(Mexico) Javier Robles	Fired	(Mexico) Óscar Robles	
Bravos de León	(United States) Tim Johnson	(Puerto Rico) Eddie Castro	Fired	(Mexico) Martín Enríquez	
Pericos de Puebla	(Mexico) Carlos Gastélum	N/A	Fired	(Mexico) Gerardo Sánchez	
Leones de Yucatán	(Mexico) Gerónimo Gil	(Mexico) Juan Francisco Rodríguez	Fired	(Puerto Rico) Luis Matos	
Toros de Tijuana	(Venezuela) Omar Vizquel	N/A	Fired	(Mexico) Homar Rojas	

== League leaders ==
Batting leaders
Stat	Player	Team	Total
AVG	(Mexico) Leo Heras	Guadalajara	.401
HR	(Dominican Republic) Rainel Rosario	Saltillo	20
RBI	(Dominican Republic) Leandro Castro	Tijuana	72
R	(United States) Beau Amaral	Guadalajara	65
H	(Dominican Republic) Leandro Castro	Tijuana	93
SB	(Colombia) Reynaldo Rodríguez	Tigres	21
SLG	(United States) David Olmedo-Barrera	Puebla	.694

Pitching leaders
Stat	Player	Team	Total
ERA	(Colombia) Luis Escobar	Tabasco	2.54
W	(Japan) Masaru Nakamura	Guadalajara	8
SV	(Dominican Republic) Fernando Rodney	Tijuana	16
IP	(United States) Rafael Pineda	Unión Laguna	77.0
K	(United States) Jackson Stephens	Dos Laredos	69
K	(Dominican Republic) José Valdez	Puebla	69
WHIP	(United States) Jake Thompson	Yucatán	1.07

== Milestones ==
=== Pitchers ===
==== No-hitters ====
- Dylan Unsworth (VER): On 28 May, Unsworth threw his first no-hitter in the Mexican League by defeating the Diablos Rojos del México 8–0.

== Awards ==
Award	Player	Team	Ref.
Most Valuable Player	(Dominican Republic) Leandro Castro	Tijuana	
Rookie of the Year	(Mexico) Juan Carlos Camacho	Oaxaca	
Best Pitcher	(Japan) Masaru Nakamura	Guadalajara	
Best Relief Pitcher	(Dominican Republic) Fernando Rodney	Tijuana	
Manager of the Year	(Mexico) Benji Gil	Guadalajara	
