= Carlos Peralta =

Carlos Peralta may refer to:

- Carlos Peralta (businessman) (born 1951), Mexican businessman and baseball team owner
- Carlos Peralta (footballer) (born 1990), Colombian professional footballer
- Carlos Peralta (swimmer) (born 1994), Spanish swimmer and physician
