= Luis Borges (baseball) =

Mexican baseball player and manager (born 1980)

- Infielder / Coach / Manager
- Born: 10 July 1980 (age 45); Mérida, Yucatán, Mexico
- Bats: Left Throws: Right

Luis Beltrán Borges Burgos (born 10 July 1980), nicknamed "Vampiro", is a Mexican professional baseball coach and manager and former infielder. Borges played 17 seasons in the Mexican League (LMB) and 13 seasons in the Mexican Pacific League (LMP). After retiring, he has coached for LMB and LMP teams.

== Playing career ==
=== Early career ===
Borges was born on 10 July 1980 in Mérida, Yucatán. In 2000, he was signed by the Kansas City Royals organization and assigned to the Gulf Coast League Royals, where he appeared in 43, recording a .229/.285/.264 hitting line.

=== Mexican League ===
Borges made his debut in the Mexican League (LMB) with the Langosteros de Cancún, appearing in 76 games during his rookie season and recording 46 hits, 9 RBIs and a .236/.260/.272 batting line.

In 2003, Borges joined the Leones de Yucatán, where he played until 2013, primarily as a shortstop. In 2014, he was signed by the Saraperos de Saltillo. On 15 June 2017, Borges recorded his 1,700th career hit against the Generales de Durango. Borges officially announced his retirement on 21 February 2018.

Over his Mexican League career, Borges appeared in 1,618 games and recorded 785 runs scored, 268 doubles, 28 triples, 15 home runs, 565 RBIs and a .305 batting average. He was selected to the Mexican League All-Star Game eight times in 2009, 2010, 2011, 2012, 2013, 2014, 2015 and 2017. Borges was named the All-Star Game Most Valuable Player in 2013 and won the LMB Gold Glove Award at second base in 2016.

Mexican League career statistics
Seasons	G	AB	R	H	2B	3B	HR	RBI	SB	BB	BA	SLG
17	1618	5710	785	1739	268	28	15	565	43	394	.305	.369

=== Mexican Pacific League ===
Borges played 13 seasons in the Mexican Pacific League (LMP). From 2002 to 2012, he played with the Algodoneros de Guasave. He later spent two seasons with the Naranjeros de Hermosillo from 2012 to 2014. During the 2014–15 season, Borges played for both the Mayos de Navojoa and the Yaquis de Obregón, before concluding his winter league career with the Tomateros de Culiacán during the 2015–16 season.

Mexican Pacific League career statistics
Seasons	G	AB	R	H	2B	3B	HR	RBI	SB	BB	BA	SLG
13	376	925	84	235	40	1	3	77	4	49	.254	.357

== Coaching career ==
On 2 March 2023, Borges was announced as the manager for the Mariachis de Guadalajara in the first managerial job of his career. Borges was fired in June after posting a 14–25 record and was replaced by Adán Muñoz. In July, he joined the coaching staff of the Pericos de Puebla under Sergio Omar Gastélum as bench coach.

On 29 December 2023, Borges joined the Generales de Durango as the team's manager. However, in March 2024 it was officially announced that a new team, Caliente de Durango, owned by Grupo Caliente, would be joining the Mexican League as a replacement for the Generales. Borges and most of the players remained with the new team. He was dismissed on 29 May 2024 and replaced by Raúl Chávez. In June 2024, he again joined the Pericos de Puebla as part of Sergio Omar Gastélum's staff.

In 2025, Borges joined the Olmecas de Tabasco coaching staff as third base coach under manager Willie Romero.

== Managerial statistics ==
=== Mexican League ===
Year	Team	Regular season						Postseason			
Year	Team	Games	Won	Lost	Tied	Pct.	Finish	Won	Lost	Pct.	Notes
2023	Mariachis de Guadalajara	39	14	25	0	.359	–	–	–	–	–
2024	Caliente de Durango	37	14	23	0	.378	–	–	–	–	–
Total		76	28	48	0	.368					
