= Tucson LMP baseball team =

Baseball team in the Mexican Pacific League

Tucson Baseball Team
Logo
Cap insignia

Information
- League: Mexican Pacific League
- Location: Tucson, Arizona (Note: The team is administratively based in Tucson, Arizona; however, due to issues with visas, the team has never played an official home game in Tucson.)
- Ballpark: Kino Veterans Memorial Stadium
- Founded: 2025
- Colors: Brown, beige and burgundy
- Ownership: Tucson Sports & Entertainment LLC
- General manager: Víctor Cuevas Valenzuela
- Manager: Matías Carrillo
- Website: https://tucsonbaseball.net/

The Tucson Baseball Team was a professional baseball team in the Mexican Pacific League (LMP) based in Tucson, Arizona, at Kino Veterans Memorial Stadium, that began play in October 2025. On March 16, 2026, it was reported that the team would relocate to Mexico ahead of the 2026 LMP season due to visa issues that prevented players from legally playing home games in the United States.

== History ==
In May 2025, the Mexican Pacific League (LMP) club Mayos de Navojoa, based in Navojoa, Sonora from its inception in 1959 until the end of the 2024–25 season, relocated across the border to Tucson, Arizona. This movement was officially approved and announced by the league on 20 May 2025. This marked the first time that a LMP franchise would play in the United States.

The team did not choose a nickname; instead, they decided to play as the Tucson Baseball Team. The club's management announced, however, that in the future they would select a nickname together with the fans. On 5 June 2025, Willie Romero was announced as the team's manager.

Tucson's inaugural series, scheduled to take part from 16 to 19 October 2025, had to be cancelled since many players and staff did not have visas from the United States government. As of December 2025, the team has been forced to play all of its home games on the road because of this issue.

On 28 November 2025, Matías Carrillo replaced Romero as the team's manager.

The club did not resolve the visa issue; thus, during the 2025–26 season, the team did not play a single game at Kino Veterans Memorial Stadium and instead played all its games on the road.

== Roster ==
Tucson Baseball Team roster
Active roster		Coaches
Pitchers: 72 (United States) Garrett Alexander; 22 (Mexico) Carlos Bustamante; 18 (Mexico) Raúl Carrillo; 11 (United States) Dakota Chalmers; 63 (Mexico) Daniel de la Fuente; 2 (United States) Christian Edwards; 14 (United States) Charlie Hasty; 68 (Mexico) Erick Preciado; 57 (Mexico) Dalton Rodríguez; 95 (Mexico) Andre Sánchez; 59 (Mexico) Jorge Sauceda; 16 (United States) Mark Simon; 58 (Mexico) Oscar Soria; 90 (Mexico) Edwyn Valle; 33 (United States) Ben Wetzler; 70 (Mexico) Daniel Zazueta	Catchers: 51 (Mexico) Luis Amador; 17 (Mexico) Marco Chicuate; 25 (Mexico) Francisco Pérez; 26 (Mexico) Alexis Wilson; Infielders: 12 (Mexico) Samar Leyva; 1 (Mexico) Edgar Lugo; 67 (Mexico) Ramón Mendoza; 20 (Mexico) Missael Rivera; 81 (Mexico) Marcos Valenzuela; Outfielders: 36 (Mexico) Jesús Fabela; 8 (United States) Gaige Howard; 31 (Mexico) Alejandro Quezada; 32 (Mexico) Agustín Ruiz; 41 (United States) River Town	Manager: (Mexico) Matías Carrillo; Roster updated on 22 December 2025
