= Mark Weidemaier =

American baseball player (born 1955)

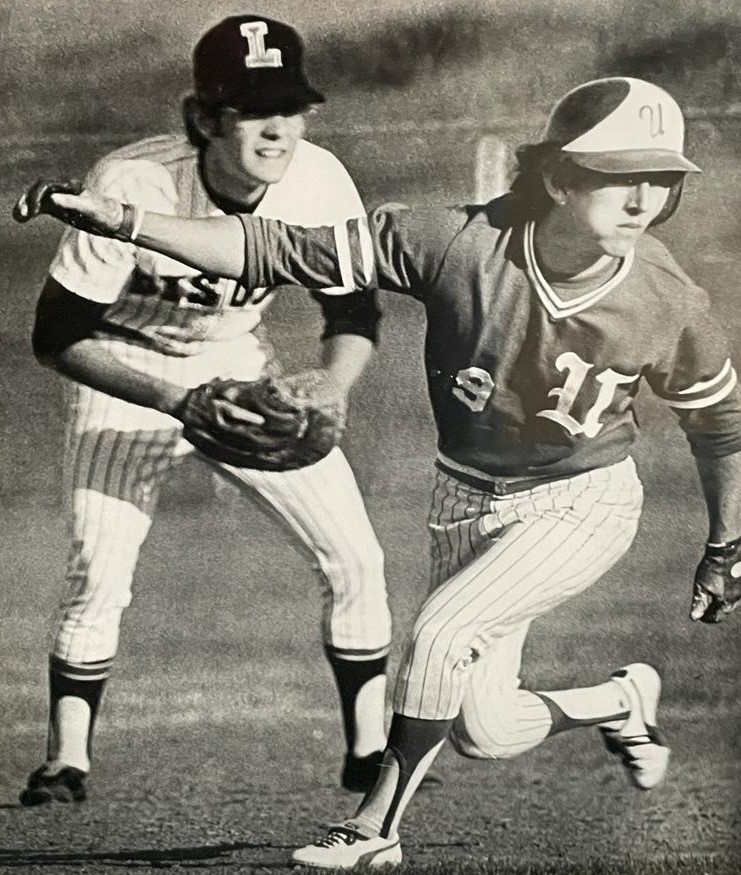
- Weidemaier stretching a double at Union University in 1977
- Manager
- Born: January 17, 1955 (age 71); Columbus, Ohio
- Bats: Right Throws: Right
- Stats at Baseball Reference

Teams
- Scouting roles: California Angels (1985–1987); Cleveland Indians (1991–1995); Chicago White Sox (1996–1998); Los Angeles Dodgers (1999–2010); Italy national baseball team (2026); Coaching roles: Kansas City Royals (1982–1984); California Angels (1985–1987); Arizona Diamondbacks (2011–2013); Washington Nationals (2014–2015); United States national baseball team aka Team, USA (2016–2026); Samsung Lions (2016–2017); Kia Tigers (2020–2021); Long Island Ducks (2022); Tecolotes de los Dos Laredos (2022); Saraperos de Saltillo (2023); Bismarck Larks (2024–2025); Asheboro ZooKeepers (2025); Staten Island FerryHawks (2026); Management roles: Special Assistant to GM Los Angeles Dodgers (2009–2010); Special Assistant to GM Arizona Diamondbacks (2011–2013)

Mark Peter Weidemaier (born January 17, 1955) is an American baseball manager and baseball coach, currently the Bench Coach for the Staten Island FerryHawks of the Atlantic League of Professional Baseball. He was formerly a member of the Washington Nationals coaching staff and has also served as an advance scout during his baseball career.

== Early years ==
Weidemaier attended Upper Arlington High School in Upper Arlington, Ohio, graduating as a two sport letterman (basketball and baseball) in 1973. He played college baseball for Union University in Jackson, Tennessee, where he was twice selected to the All West Tennessee College All Star Team as named by The Jackson Sun. In 2022, Weidemaier was inducted into Union University's Sports Hall of Fame. He then served as an assistant coach for the Ohio State Buckeyes baseball team while he attended Ohio State University, earning a master's degree in Sports Administration.

== Scouting ==
Upon graduation in 1982, he accepted a position as a minor league coach in the Kansas City Royals organization. From 1984 to 1987, he worked for the California Angels as a scout and minor league coach. During this period he additionally headed up the Angel's baseball academy in the Dominican Republic, participating as well in winter ball as bench coach for the Venados de Mazatlán (Mazatlán Deer) in the Liga Mexicana del Pacifico (Mexican Pacific League). Weidemaier next piloted the then named Algodoneros de Torreon of the Mexican League, today's Algodoneros de Unión Laguna, for latter part of the 1988 season (replacing Alfredo Rios). The year 1989 saw Weidemaier with the Prince William Cannons (18–23, before being replaced by Stump Merrill).

Weidemaier then transitioned to a player development role joining the New York Yankees and serving in that capacity from 1989 to 1990. He departed the Yankees to become the Director of Player Development for the Pastejé Baseball Academy of the Mexican League located in Jocotitlán, coaching future MLB stand-outs including Juan Castro and Ismael Valdez. From 1991 to 1995, he was a Cleveland Indians scout covering the eastern United States and Latin America. Over the course of his scouting tenure, players signed by Weidemaier included big leaguers such as Paul Sorrento, Herbert Perry, and Jon Nunnally.

From 1996 to 1998, he was elevated to an advance scout role in the Chicago White Sox organization. He continued as an advance scout for the Los Angeles Dodgers from 1999 to 2006, and was special assignment scout from 2007 to 2008, then was advance scout again as well as special assistant to the general manager in 2009–2010. Several examples of Weidemaier's scouting reports are part of the digital archive being assembled by the National Baseball Hall of Fame in Cooperstown, New York.

== Coaching ==
Weidemaier worked as an advance scout with the Arizona Diamondbacks from 2011 through 2013. After the 2013 season, Diamondbacks coach Matt Williams was named manager of the Washington Nationals, Weidemaier joined the Nationals on Williams' staff as the team's defensive positioning coach. Following the 2015 season, the Nationals fired Williams and the entire coaching staff.

Mark next accepted a position with the Rojos del Águila de Veracruz (Veracruz Red Eagles) in the AAA Mexican League during the 2015–2016 season. As field manager, he led the team through the season coaching, recruiting and signing players. With the end of the Mexican winter league, Mark coached first in the MLB Coaching Development Program both in the Dominican Republic and The Bahamas during the spring of 2016, and then for Team USA Baseball in the early Summer of '16. Beginning mid-2016, Mark was brought on board by the Samsung Lions of the KBO League and served a dual role as scouting coordinator / assistant coach for the remainder of the '16 season and the entire 2017 season.

In April 2018, Mark resigned from the Samsung team upon being hired by the Cincinnati Reds into an advance scouting role, under manager Jim Riggleman. Though the Reds started strong, they ultimately went 67-95 for the season and Riggleman and his staff were subsequently let go by the Red's front office. Mark then briefly managed the Westside (Detroit) Wooly Mammoths in the United Shore Professional Baseball League in 2019 before returning to South Korea with the Kia Tigers in late 2019. For the next two seasons, Weidemaier served as bench coach for the team working for team manager Matt Williams.

As of 2022, Weidemaier returned to the Mexican League. In late-2021, he was announced as the new manager of the Tecolotes de los Dos Laredos. He managed the first ten games of the season, after which he parted ways with the team for what the club cited as personal reasons. By mid-Summer, Weidemaier came on board with the Long Island Ducks in the Atlantic League of Professional Baseball (ALPB). He served as the pitching coach for the Ducks, based on Long Island in Central Islip, New York.

In late-2022, Weidemaier announced his return to the Mexican League as the new manager of the Saraperos de Saltillo. He was released on May 4, 2023, following a 6–6 start to the season. In September 2023, Weidemajer was announced as the manager of the Bismarck Larks of the Northwoods League, a summer collegiate wood bat league. He coached the Larks during both the 2024 and 2025 seasons. In September of 2025, Weidemaier separated with the Larks, accepting the position of manager in the Coastal Plain League with the Asheboro ZooKeepers in his home state of North Carolina for the 2026 season.

The World Baseball Classic is played every four years, and like soccer’s World Cup, it pits teams from countries across the globe in a tournament to determine a world champion. In 2026, team Italy chose to utilize an advance scout, which is not the MLB-norm. Italy’s General Manager, Ned Colletti, selected Mark Weidemaier to scout each team Italy was to face during the tournament. Italy became something of the tournament darling, beating the United States and ultimately earning a fourth-place finish, behind Venezuela, USA, and the Dominican Republic.

As of 2026, Weidemaier was asked, by manager Wally Backman, to assume the role of Bench Coach for the Staten Island Ferryhawks of the Atlantic League of Professional Baseball. Mark came on board with the team at the beginning of the 2026 season. The Ferryhawks play in the North Division of the league. At home, they play in the 7,171 seat SIUH Community Park.
