= Pastejé Baseball Academy =

Baseball academy in State of Mexico, Mexico

- Interactive map of Pastejé Baseball Academy
- Location: Jocotitlán, State of Mexico
- Coordinates: 19°38′57″N 99°47′11″W
- Owner: Alejo Peralta
- Type: Baseball academy

Construction
- Opened: 1981
- Closed: 1992

The Pastejé Baseball Academy, commonly known as Pastejé, was a baseball academy located in Jocotitlán, State of Mexico, Mexico. The academy was founded in 1981 by Alejo Peralta, owner of the Mexican League team Tigres de México in association with the league to train players for the entire Mexican League. The academy closed in 1992 and is now abandoned and in ruins.

== History ==
The precursor of the Pastejé Baseball Academy was a baseball academy established by Alejo Peralta at the Club Hacienda in Mexico City. Initially created to develop young talent for the Tigres de México, owned by Peralta, it later expanded its mission in alliance with the Mexican League authorities, led by Pedro Treto Cisneros. In the spring of 1981 the academy relocated to the Hacienda Pastejé in Jocotitlán, State of Mexico and was renamed the Pastejé Baseball Academy. Its primary goal was to train young players for the Mexican League.

The first generation of players graduated on 1 March 1982, with 48 young players participating in a draft that included all the sixteen teams of the Mexican League. Each team selected three players, except for the Dorados de Chihuahua, that picked four after the Petroleros de Poza Rica yielded one of their selections. Some notable graduates from the 1982 draft included Matías Carrillo, selected by the Petroleros de Poza Rica and Homar Rojas, picked by the Sultanes de Monterrey.

José Ceceña became the first Pastejé graduate to play in the Major League Baseball (MLB), making his debut with the Texas Rangers in 1988. Other notable graduates include: Matías Carrillo, Daniel Fernández, Isidro Márquez, José Luis Sandoval, Juan Gabriel Castro, Ismael Valdéz, Antonio Osuna, Francisco Campos, Humberto Cota, Noé Muñoz, Ricardo Rincón and Karim García.

The academy closed in 1992, after producing eleven generations and more than 200 players. In 1996, the Mexican League established a new academy in El Carmen, Nuevo León.
