= Carlos Bustamante (baseball) =

Mexican baseball player (born 1994)

Leones de Yucatán – No. 74
- Pitcher
- Born: September 25, 1994 (age 31); Navojoa, Mexico
- Bats: Right Throws: Right
Medals
Men's baseball
Representing Mexico
2019 WBSC Premier12
Bronze medal – third place	2019 Tokyo	National team

Carlos Alberto Bustamante (born September 25, 1994) is a Mexican professional baseball relief pitcher for the Leones de Yucatán of the Mexican League. Bustamante is listed at 6 feet 0 inches (1.83 m) and 190 pounds (86 kg) and bats and throws right handed.

== Career ==
=== Tigres de Quintana Roo ===
On April 13, 2012, Bustamante signed with the Tigres de Quintana Roo of the Mexican League. In his debut season, Bustamante recorded a 4.50 ERA in 2 games with the team. In 2013, Bustamante posted a 3–0 record and 5.31 ERA in 40 appearances. The following season, Bustamante appeared in 11 games for the Tigres, struggling to an 8.10 ERA in 11 appearances. For the 2015 season, Bustamante pitched in 24 games for Quintana Roo, logging a 2–2 record and 2.84 ERA with 50 strikeouts in 66 2/3 innings of work.

=== Pericos de Puebla ===
On January 7, 2016, Bustamante was traded to the Pericos de Puebla of the Mexican League. He appeared in 49 games for Puebla in 2016, pitching to a 4–2 record and 4.24 ERA with 39 strikeouts in 51 innings pitched.

=== Arizona Diamondbacks ===
On June 21, 2017, Bustamante signed a minor league contract with the Arizona Diamondbacks organization. He split the year between the rookie-level Arizona League Diamondbacks, rookie-level Missoula Osprey, and Single-A Kane County Cougars, posting a cumulative 0.31 ERA in 17 appearances. Bustamante split the 2018 season between the High-A Visalia Rawhide and Kane County, recording a 2–1 record and 4.84 ERA in 41 appearances between the two teams. On March 18, 2019, Bustamante was released by the Diamondbacks organization.

=== Acereros de Monclova ===
On April 3, 2019, Bustamante signed with the Acereros de Monclova of the Mexican League. In 47 games for Monclova, he registered a 2.57 ERA with 27 saves and 67 strikeouts, and earned Mexican League All-Star honors.

=== Philadelphia Phillies ===
On December 24, 2019, Bustamante signed a minor league deal with the Philadelphia Phillies organization. Bustamante did not play in a game in 2020 due to the cancellation of the minor league season because of the COVID-19 pandemic. Bustamante was released by the Phillies organization on May 29, 2020.

=== Acereros de Monclova (second stint) ===
On May 20, 2021, Bustamante signed with the Acereros de Monclova of the Mexican League. In 20 appearances out of the bullpen, he logged an 0-1 record and 4.57 ERA with 27 strikeouts and 13 saves across 21 2/3 innings pitched.

Bustamante made 5 scoreless appearances for Monclova during the 2022 season, striking out 3 in 4 1/3 innings. In 2023, he pitched in 23 contests for the Acereros, compiling a 1-1 record and 3.72 ERA with 25 strikeouts across 19 1/3 innings pitched.

Bustamante made 25 relief appearances for Monclova in 2024, registering a 2-1 record and 3.57 ERA with 18 strikeouts across 22 2/3 innings pitched.

=== Piratas de Campeche ===
On March 12, 2025, Bustamante was traded to the Guerreros de Oaxaca of the Mexican League. However, on April 17, Bustamante signed with the Piratas de Campeche. He made 30 appearances (including one start) for Campeche, accumulating a 1-1 record and 5.45 ERA with 26 strikeouts and one save over 33 innings of work.

=== Charros de Jalisco ===
On May 9, 2026, Bustamante signed with the Charros de Jalisco of the Mexican League. In eight relief appearances for the Charros, he struggled to a 22.85 ERA, striking out two batters in 4 1/3 innings of work. On June 24, Bustamante was released by Jalisco.

=== Leones de Yucatán ===
On June 29, 2026, Bustamante signed with the Leones de Yucatán of the Mexican League.

== International career ==
Bustamante was selected to the Mexico national baseball team at the 2020 Summer Olympics (contested in 2021).
