= Estadio Coloso Don Alejo Peralta =

Sports venue in Tepic, Mexico

Coordinates: 21.5271°N 104.8952°W

- Interactive map of Estadio Coloso Don Alejo Peralta
- Full name: Estadio Coloso Don Alejo Peralta
- Location: Tepic, Nayarit, Mexico
- Owner: State of Nayarit
- Capacity: 9,563
- Surface: Natural grass

Construction
- Opened: 2024

Tenant
- Jaguares de Nayarit (LMP) (2025–)

Estadio Coloso Don Alejo Peralta is a multi-use stadium in Tepic, Nayarit, Mexico. It is currently used mostly for baseball matches. The stadium has a capacity of 9,563 people and opened in 2024.
