= Sasagi Sánchez =

Mexican baseball player (born 1994)

Charros de Jalisco – No. 79
- Pitcher
- Born: June 3, 1994 (age 32); Mazatlán, Mexico
- Bats: Right Throws: Right

Sasagi Sánchez (born June 3, 1994) is a Mexican professional baseball relief pitcher for the Charros de Jalisco of the Mexican League. Sánchez is listed at 5 feet 9 inches (1.75 m) and 176 pounds (80 kg) and bats and throws right-handed.

== Career ==
=== Acereros de Monclova ===
On April 4, 2014, Sánchez signed with the Acereros de Monclova of the Mexican League. In his rookie season, Sánchez made 34 appearances for Monclova, posting a 3-2 record and 5.05 ERA. In 2015, Sánchez pitched in only nine games with the team, registering a 1-2 record and 4.09 ERA. The following season, Sánchez logged a 2-6 record and 4.98 ERA in 24 appearances for the team.

=== Pericos de Puebla ===
On March 28, 2017, Sánchez was traded to the Pericos de Puebla alongside Juan Avila in exchange for Hector Galvan, Henry Garcia, Jaime Lugo, Julio Felix, Oscar Sanay, Rogelio Bernal, and Sergio Perez. In five games with the Pericos, Sánchez struggled to a 15.19 ERA.

=== Acereros de Monclova (second stint) ===
On May 1, 2017, Sánchez was traded back to the Acereros de Monclova in exchange for Henry Garcia. He pitched in two games for Monclova, recording a 3.00 ERA with 4 strikeouts in 3.0 innings of work.

=== Olmecas de Tabasco ===
On May 21, 2017, Sánchez was loaned to the Olmecas de Tabasco of the Mexican League. He finished the year with Tabasco, pitching in 36 games and posting a 2.93 ERA with 19 strikeouts.

=== Pericos de Puebla (second stint) ===
On September 11, 2017, Sánchez was returned to the Pericos de Puebla. Sánchez pitched in 46 games for the team in 2018, posting a 2-5 record with 43 strikeouts. In 2019, Sánchez pitched in 59 games for the Pericos, recording a 4-3 record and 7.51 ERA with 41 strikeouts in 50 1/3 innings of work.

=== Diablos Rojos del México ===
On December 11, 2019, Sánchez was traded to the Acereros de Monclova alongside Bernardo Heras and Sergio Perez in exchange for Ishmael Salas and Mark Serrano. On March 9, 2020, Sánchez was traded to the Diablos Rojos del México of the Mexican League. Sánchez did not play in a game in 2020 due to the cancellation of the Mexican League season because of the COVID-19 pandemic.

In 41 relief appearances in 2023, Sánchez struggled to a 6.81 ERA with 41 strikeouts across 39 2/3 innings of work.

=== Dorados de Chihuahua ===
On February 7, 2024, México loaned Sánchez to the Dorados de Chihuahua. In 23 appearances for Chihuahua, Sánchez recorded a 3.60 ERA with 22 strikeouts and five saves across 25 innings of work.

=== Sultanes de Monterrey ===
On July 22, 2024, Sánchez was traded to the Sultanes de Monterrey of the Mexican League. He made four relief appearances for Monterrey, surrendering no earned runs and only four hits in 4 1/3 innings pitched.

=== Charros de Jalisco ===
On December 23, 2024, Sánchez was traded to the Charros de Jalisco of the Mexican League.

== International career ==
Sánchez was selected to the Mexico national baseball team at the 2020 Summer Olympics (contested in 2021).
