= Olivia Peralta =

Mexican television hostess and entrepreneur (born 1981)

- Born: Olivia Peralta Garcia; June 10, 1981 (age 45)
- Occupations: Hostess, Actor, Author
- Relatives: Olivia Leyva (mother)
- Website: www.mundorosa.com.mx

Olivia Peralta (born, June 10, 1981) is a Mexican television hostess, and entrepreneur

. She is known for her role as co-host of PICNIC, a talk show on Telehit, a channel owned by Televisa. She is also co-founder of the Mundo Rosa website, a web-only magazine focusing on teenaged girls.

== Professional career ==
=== Television ===
Her breakout role came as co-hostess for the television show PICNIC, which she co-hosted for almost 9 years. She was a judge on Discovery Home & Health's show Desafío Fashionista.

=== Modeling ===
Olivia Peralta began modeling at age 16, and continues to model.

=== Writing ===
Olivia is co-author of the best-selling book Mundo Rosa – Tu Guia Maxima De Belleza.

== Mundo Rosa ==
Olivia Peralta and Angie Taddei are co-founders of www.mundorosa.com.mx, a website that covers topics of interest to teenage girls and young women. They have since expanded the brand to include a best-selling book, and now a yearly expo called Mundo Rosa, La Experiencia which is meant to demonstrate products and advice provided on the website.

== Other work ==
=== Infatuation ===
Olivia Peralta founded a fashion line called Infatuation.

=== Educator ===
Olivia Peralta is a co-founder of Colegio Real Bosque, a school focusing on new ways to teach young children.

== Personal life ==
Peralta's partner was a Dubai-based bank employee for Justin Morgan-Cooper; he moved to Mexico looking for a job or business opportunities. She is the mother to three girls, Gia, Luciana and Olivia.

Olivia Peralta is the daughter of Carlos Peralta, son of Alejo Peralta, owner and founder of IUSA, and Olivia Leyva, a Mexican actress, television presenter and model, known as one of the actresses who portrayed the character of Gloria in the sitcom television series El Chavo del Ocho. a prominent Mexican businessman. Loreto Peralta, star of Instructions Not Included, is Olivia Peralta's niece.
