= Olivia Leyva =

Mexican entertainer (1948–2019)

- Leyva in the role of Gloria, 1975
- Born: Olivia García Leyva; 30 October 1948; Acapulco, Guerrero, Mexico
- Died: 14 February 2019 (aged 70) (Note: Her obituary in El Universal put her date of death as 14 February while other sources like Univision put it on 17 February 2019.)
- Other names: Olivia García; Olivia García Leiva
- Occupations: Actress; television presenter; model
- Years active: 1970–1990s
- Notable work: Gloria in El Chavo del Ocho (1975); Presenter of Topo Gigio (Mexican edition)
- Spouse: Carlos Peralta (divorced in 1996)
- Children: 2, including Olivia

Olivia García Leyva (30 October 1948 – 14 February 2019) was a Mexican actress, model, and television presenter.

== Career ==
Leyva was born in Acapulco, in the state of Guerrero, in October 1948. Before taking up modelling and acting, she taught at a local primary school, leaving shortly after obtaining third place in a beauty pageant in 1967. In the first years of her career, Leyva took many advertisement jobs, as she was sought by companies that highly considered her physical beauty.

In 1971 she began having small roles in Mexican films like Las reglas del juego and La fuerza inútil. In 1975, Leyva joined the cast of El Chavo del Ocho for four episodes, portraying the role of Gloria, a pretty woman who moves into the vecindad with her niece Patty. Her character is the subject of romantic attraction from Don Ramón, Professor Jirafales, and other male characters. Leyva was one of four actresses who portrayed the same role in the series, the others being Maribel Fernández in 1972, Regina Torné in 1978 and Maricarmen Vela in 1987.

Leyva's career in the years that followed included photo comics and presenting the Mexican version of the children's show Topo Gigio, featuring the Italian character of Topo Gigio. She retired from acting after marrying businessman Carlos Peralta, a son of Mexican businessman Alejo Peralta. The couple had children, including Olivia Peralta. They divorced in 1996.

== Death ==
Leyva died at the age of 70 on 14 February 2019. Her death was announced on Instagram by her daughter Olivia, and an obituary was featured for her in the newspaper El Universal.
