= Mariachis de Guadalajara =

Logo	Cap insignia

Information
- League: Mexican League (2021–2023)
- Location: Zapopan, Jalisco
- Ballpark: Estadio Panamericano (2021–2023)
- Established: 2020
- Folded: 2023
- Colors: Black and white
- Website: https://mariachisbeisbol.com/

Current uniforms
Home

The Mariachis de Guadalajara (English: Guadalajara Mariachis) were a professional baseball team in the Mexican League based in Zapopan, Jalisco, in the Guadalajara metropolitan area. Their home ballpark was the Estadio Panamericano, with a capacity of 16,500 people. The Mariachis were established in December 2020 and started playing in the 2021 season.

After struggling financially for most of the 2023 season, the team was bought by the Charros de Jalisco, who replaced the Mariachis in the Mexican League.

== History ==
The team was established on 8 December 2020, when Mexican president Andrés Manuel López Obrador announced that two new teams would join the Mexican League for the 2021 season: a revival of El Águila de Veracruz (the original franchise was sold in 2017 and moved to Nuevo Laredo) and the Mariachis de Guadalajara. The creation of the Mariachis was a joint effort between the Mexican government, the State of Jalisco and private investment.

With the establishment of the Mariachis, Guadalajara joined Monterrey as the only two cities in Mexico that had teams in both the summer league and the winter league.

In March 2021, former Texas Rangers and Anaheim Angels shortstop Benji Gil was announced as the Mariachis' manager for the 2021 season. In their maiden season, the Mariachis finished first in the North Division with a 46–17 record but lost the North Division Championship Series against the Toros de Tijuana 2–4. In January 2022, Gil left the team to coach with the Anaheim Angels.

Sergio Omar Gastélum was appointed manager of the Mariachis ahead of the 2022 season. Gastélum failed to repeat the good performance from the last season with the team and was fired after the end of the season, with the Mariachis finishing last in the North Division with a 33–57 record.

The team hired Luis Borges as manager ahead of the 2023 season, in his career's first managing job. Borges was fired in June after recording 14–25 and was replaced by Adán Muñoz.

The Mariachis struggled financially during most of the 2023 season. The team owners, Carlos Valenzuela and Rafael Tejada, had debts with the players, personnel and an animation squad from Dominican Republic. Due to this, the players decided not to play a game against Sultanes de Monterrey in the season's last series. The club's owners even failed to pay the Jalisco's State Council for Sports Promotion for the use of the Estadio Panamericano.

In November 2023, it was announced that the Charros de Jalisco had bought the Mariachis. On 13 November, the Charros' owners paid an advance of 20 million pesos (approximately 1.2 million US dollars) to the Mariachis, that were allocated to pay the debts that Valenzuela and Tejada had with their staff.

On 14 November, it was officially announced by the Mexican League that the Charros de Jalisco would replace the Mariachis in the 2024 season, thus, marking the end of the Mariachis de Guadalajara.

== Final roster ==
Mariachis de Guadalajara roster
Players	Coaches/Other
Pitchers: 31 Nestor Anguamea; 19 Frank Duncan; 75 Amilcar Gaxiola; 69 Antonio Guzmán; 39 Esteban Haro; 22 Andrés Iván Meza; 88 Gonzalo Ochoa; 64 Vidal Sotelo; 31 Carlos Vázquez; Catchers: 51 Juan Camacho; 38 Carlos M. Rodríguez; Infielders: 91 Ricky Álvarez; 2 José Guadalupe Chávez; 62 Vimael Machín; 24 José Orrantia; 66 Brayan Quintero; 12 Issmael Salas; 16 Óliver Zepeda; Outfielders: 10 Oswaldo Arcia; 87 Luis Cossío; 77 José Figueroa; 1 Randy Romero; 20 Mallex Smith	Manager: -- Adán Muñoz; Coaches: 45 Jasiel Acosta (bullpen); 28 Carlos Alvarez (hitting); 23 Ruben Estrada (third base); 3 Gerardo Garza (bench); 5 Houston Jiménez (first base); 27 Placido Pinto (catchers); 58 Luis Vasquez (pitching); 7-day injured list; ~ Development list; # Rehab assignment; ∞ Reserve list; ‡ Restricted list; § Suspended list; † Temporarily inactive list; Roster updated February 14, 2024; → More rosters: MiLB • Mexican League

== Season-by-season ==
Season	League	Division	Finish	Wins	Losses	Win%	GB	Postseason
2021	LMB	North	1st	46	17	.730	–	Lost Championship Series (Toros) 2–4
2022	LMB	North	9th	33	57	.367	29.0	
2023	LMB	North	8th	42	48	.467	10.0	
Totals				W	L	Win%		
Totals				121	122	.498	All-time regular season record (2021–2023)	
Totals				2	4	.333	All-time postseason record	
Totals				123	126	.494	All-time regular and postseason record	

== Award winners and league leaders ==
=== Awards ===
==== Pitcher of the Year Award ====
- Masaru Nakamura (2021)

==== Manager of the Year Award ====
- Benji Gil (2021)

==== Rookie of the Year Award ====
- Randy Romero (2023)

=== League leaders ===
==== Batting champions ====
- Leo Heras (2021)

==== Runs ====
- Beau Amaral (2021)

==== Wins ====
- Masaru Nakamura (2021)
