= Sergio Omar Gastélum =

Mexican baseball player and manager (born 1978)

Pericos de Puebla
- Infielder / Manager
- Born: 19 October 1978 (age 48); Ciudad Obregón, Sonora, Mexico
- Bats: Right Throws: Right
Medals
Men's baseball
Representing Mexico
Central American and Caribbean Games
Silver medal – second place	2010 Mayagüez	Team

Sergio Omar Gastélum Galaviz (born 19 October 1978) is a Mexican professional baseball manager and former infielder who currently serves as the manager of the Pericos de Puebla of the Mexican League.

As a player, Gastélum spent his entire career in Mexico, playing in both the Mexican League (LMB), where he played 22 seasons between 1995 and 2017, and the Mexican Pacific League (LMP), where he played 20 seasons from 1997 to 2017. Since his retirement after the 2017 season, he has managed several teams in both leagues.

== Playing career ==
=== Mexican League ===
Gastélum made his professional debut in the Mexican League in 1995 with the Tigres de México, aged 16. He appeared in three games, recording three at bats without a hit. He played for the Tigres until 2006, when he was traded to the Vaqueros Laguna, where he quickly became a key player for the Vaqueros, batting .332 with 132 hits, 59 RBI and eight home runs in 2007.

In 2011, he joined the Guerreros de Oaxaca, playing two seasons with the team before being traded to the Diablos Rojos del México, where he played from 2013 to 2015. He did not play during the 2016 season and returned to the Diablos Rojos for his final season in 2017.

He played a total of 22 seasons in the Mexican League, appearing in 1,675 games and recording a .310 batting average with 1,846 hits, 836 RBI and 82 home runs. During his career, he won five Mexican League championships: four with the Tigres in 1997, 2000, 2001 and 2005, and one with the Diablos Rojos in 2014.

=== Mexican Pacific League ===
Gastélum played in the Mexican Pacific League (LMP) from 1997 to 2017. He made his debut with the Águilas de Mexicali during the 1997–98 season and remained with the club until 2006. From 2006 to 2010, he played for the Venados de Mazatlán, followed by stints with the Tomateros de Culiacán from 2010 to 2016. He played his final season, 2016–17, with his hometown team, the Yaquis de Obregón

He played a total of 20 seasons in the LMP, appearing in 838 games and recording a .253 batting average with 605 hits, 255 RBI and 32 home runs.

== Managerial career ==
=== Guerreros de Oaxaca ===
On 7 August 2018, Gastélum was appointed as manager of the Guerreros de Oaxaca of the Mexican League, replacing Joe Alvarez for the Autumn tournament. He had previously managed the Marineros de Ensenada of the Liga Norte de México. Gastélum led the team to the Serie del Rey, which they lost to the Sultanes de Monterrey, 2–4.

In 2019, he led the Guerreros to a 68–51 record, finishing seventh in the South Division.

=== Diablos Rojos del México ===
On 17 December 2019, Gastélum was announced as the manager of the Diablos Rojos del México of the Mexican League ahead of the 2020 season. However, the season was cancelled due to the COVID-19 pandemic. On 29 January 2021, Gastélum was dismissed without having managed a game with the team.

=== Sultanes de Monterrey ===
On 3 June 2021, Gastélum was hired as manager of the Sultanes de Monterrey of the Mexican League, replacing Homar Rojas, who left the team with a 4–8 record. The Sultanes finished seventh in the North Division, failing to qualify to the postseason. On 1 December 2021, he was sacked and replaced by Roberto Kelly.

=== Mariachis de Guadalajara ===
On 24 January 2022, Gastélum was appointed manager of the Mariachis de Guadalajara of the Mexican League ahead of the 2022 season. He was unable to replicate the team’s strong performance from the previous season, when the Mariachis reached the North Division Championship Series under manager Benji Gil. Gastélum was dismissed at the end of the season, after the team finished last in the North Division with a 33–57 record.

=== Pericos de Puebla ===
On 9 May 2023, Gastélum was named manager of the Pericos de Puebla of the Mexican League (LMB), replacing Héctor Hurtado, who was sacked after fifteen games and a 6–9 record. Gastélum led the Pericos to the championship; after finishing fourth in the South Division, the team made it to the Serie del Rey, where they defeated the Algodoneros de Unión Laguna, 4–2. In doing so, Gastélum became the first Mexican manager to win an LMB championship with the Pericos, earning his first title as manager.

In the 2024 season, Gastélum led the Pericos to a 40–31 record, finishing sixth in the South Division. The team was eliminated in the first round of the postseason, losing the series to the Diablos Rojos del México, 1–4. On 29 October 2024, he was removed from his position.

=== Saraperos de Saltillo ===
On 15 May 2025, Gastélum replaced Enrique Reyes as manager of the Saraperos de Saltillo of the Mexican League, following Reyes’ departure after a 9–13 start. Gastélum led the Saraperos to a 43–49 record, finishing eighth in the North Division and failing to qualify for the postseason. He was fired by the team on 30 October.

=== Leones de Yucatán ===
On 30 October 2025, Gastélum was appointed as the manager of the Leones de Yucatán of the Mexican League ahead of the 2026 season, replacing Eliézer Alfonzo, who was reassigned as coach. He was dismissed on 13 May 2026 after the team lost 11 consecutive games and dropped to last place in the South Zone, the club's worst losing streak in 20 years; he was replaced by Adulfo Camacho as interim manager.

=== Pericos de Puebla (second stint) ===
On 6 November 2026, Gastélum was appointed as manager of the Pericos de Puebla of the Mexican League ahead of the 2027 season, replacing Ramón Orantes.

== Managerial statistics ==
=== Mexican League ===
Year	Team	Regular season						Postseason			
Year	Team	Games	Won	Lost	Tied	Pct.	Finish	Won	Lost	Pct.	Notes
2018	Guerreros de Oaxaca	26	12	14	0	.462	5th	11	9	.550	Lost Serie del Rey (Monterrey)
2019	Guerreros de Oaxaca	120	68	51	1	.571	7th	1	4	.200	Lost First round (Yucatán)
2021	Sultanes de Monterrey	51	26	25	0	.510	7th	–	–	–	–
2022	Mariachis de Guadalajara	90	33	57	0	.367	9th	–	–	–	–
2023	Pericos de Puebla	72	40	31	1	.563	4th	15	9	.625	Won Serie del Rey (Unión Laguna)
2024	Pericos de Puebla	89	45	44	0	.506	6th	1	4	.200	Lost First round (México)
2025	Saraperos de Saltillo	70	34	36	0	.486	8th	–	–	–	–
Total		518	258	258	2	.500		28	26	.519	
