= Carlos Peralta (footballer) =

Colombian footballer (born 1990)

Personal information
- Full name: Carlos Andrés Peralta Barrios
- Date of birth: 14 February 1990 (age 36)
- Place of birth: San Antero, Colombia
- Height: 1.77 m (5 ft 10 in)
- Position: Forward

Youth career
- Envigado

Senior career*
Years	Team	Apps	(Gls)
2008–2010	Envigado	10	(0)
2011–2013	Leones	51	(16)
2013–2014	América de Cali	30	(9)
2015	Unión Magdalena	39	(18)
2016–2020	La Equidad	109	(43)
- * Club domestic league appearances and goals

Carlos Andrés Peralta Barrios (born 14 February 1990) is a Colombian professional footballer who last played as a forward for La Equidad.

== Career ==
For the 2015 season, Peralta signed for Colombian second division side Unión Magdalena.

For the 2016 season, he signed for La Equidad in the Colombian top flight.

He is the first professional footballer from San Antero.
