= Charros de Jalisco =

Mexican baseball team

Logo	Cap insignia

Information
- League: Mexican Pacific League (1952–55; 2014–present); Mexican League (1949–52; 1964–76; 1991–95; 2024–present)
- Location: Zapopan, Jalisco
- Ballpark: Estadio Panamericano
- Founded: 1946; 80 years ago (original); 2014; 12 years ago (modern incarnation)
- Mexican League championships: 2 (1967, 1971)
- Caribbean Series championships: 1 (2026)
- Pacific League championships: 4 (2018–19, 2021–22, 2024–25, 2025-26)
- Former league: Liga de la Costa
- Colors: Blue, gold and white
- Ownership: José Luis González Íñigo
- President: Iñigo González Covarrubias
- Manager: Benji Gil
- Website: charrosjalisco.com

The Charros de Jalisco (English: Jalisco Horsemen) are a professional baseball team who compete in both the Mexican League (LMB) and the Mexican Pacific League (LMP), based in Zapopan, Jalisco, in the Guadalajara metropolitan area. Their home ballpark is Estadio Panamericano, which has a capacity of 16,500 people.

The Charros de Jalisco have existed in various incarnations since 1946, playing in the summer-schedule Mexican League for much of their existence. The modern franchise played its initial season in the winter-schedule Pacific League in 2014–15; originally the Algodoneros de Guasave franchise from Guasave, Sinaloa, it was purchased in April 2014 by a group of investors led by Armando Navarro and relocated to Zapopan, Jalisco.

In November 2023, the Charros purchased the Mariachis de Guadalajara, and announced their return to the Mexican League. They began playing in both Mexican professional leagues after their return, becoming the second club to do so after the Sultanes de Monterrey.

== History ==
Professional baseball in Guadalajara, Jalisco originated with the Pozoleros de Jalisco, which competed in the now-defunct Central League from 1946 to 1949. From 1952 to 1955, the club competed as the Medias Azules (Blue Socks) in the Liga de la Costa del Pacífico (Pacific Coast League). The team became the Charros de Jalisco in 1949, and competed in both the early Mexican League and the Mexican Pacific League in three stages: 1949 to 1952, 1946 to 1976 and 1991 to 1995.

The second incarnation of the Charros was from 1964 and 1975. This team won Mexican League championships in 1967 and 1971. They played at the Estadio Tecnologico de Béisbol of the University of Guadalajara, which had a capacity of 4,000 spectators.

=== Origin of the name ===
The team made a road trip to the state of Chihuahua in its early history. During a stop in a small town, the players bought cowboy hats for protection from the bright sunlight. They were wearing these hats when they arrived at the destination, and were referred to as "charros".

=== First ballpark ===
The first home field for the Pozoleros/Charros was the Estadio Municipal in the Analco area, near the Agua Azul park. They played there 1949–52. This ballpark was demolished and replaced by a bus station, which is now a Federal office building.

=== Mexican League participation ===
LMB Charros de Jalisco logo

The Charros de Jalisco competed in the Mexican League for twenty-two seasons, in three stints: from 1949 to 1952; from 1964 to 1976; and from 1991 to 1995. The club won two Mexican League championships. The first in 1967, where they defeated the Broncos de Reynosa in the final under manager Guillermo Garibay. The second title was in and 1971, under manager Benjamín "Cananea" Reyes. They came back from a 0–3 deficit to defeat the Saraperos de Saltillo. Current owner Armando Navarro was vice-president of the club at the time, and he worked closely with Guillermo Cosío Gaona in the club's management.

During the late stages of the franchise in the late 1980s and 1990s, they did some aggressive hiring, including former Dodgers star Fernando Valenzuela in 1992. However, the increased popularity of football and the poor condition of the Estadio Tecnológico led to the team's demise.

=== Mexican Pacific League participation ===
The Charros participated in the Mexican Pacific League in the 1952–53, 1953–54 and 1954–55 seasons. The league was known as the Liga de la Costa del Pacífico at that time.

The Charros returned to the Mexican Pacific League for the 2014–15 season with the acquisition of the Algodoneros de Guasave franchise to relocate it to Zapopan, Jalisco.

=== Return to the Mexican League ===
On November 14, 2023, the Mexican League announced that the Charros bought the Mariachis de Guadalajara franchise and would start playing in the league in 2024.

== Honours ==
=== Mexican League championships ===
The Charros have won the Mexican League championship twice: in 1967 and 1971.

Season	Manager	Opponent	Series score	Record
1967	Guillermo Garibay	No final series		85–55
1971	Cananea Reyes	Saraperos de Saltillo	4–3	86–68

=== Mexican Pacific League championships ===
The Charros have won the Mexican Pacific League championship four times, in the 2018–19 season, when they defeated the Yaquis de Ciudad Obregón in six games, and in the 2021–22 season, both titles under manager Roberto Vizcarra, and in back-to-back seasons, when they defeated the Tomateros de Culiacán led by Benjamin Gil in the 2024-25 and 2025-26 seasons.

Season	Manager	Opponent	Series score	Record
2018–19	Roberto Vizcarra	Yaquis de Ciudad Obregón	4–2	32–35
2021–22	Roberto Vizcarra	Tomateros de Culiacán	4–3	36–31
2024–25	Benjamin Gil	Tomateros de Culiacán	4–2	37–31
2025–26	Benjamin Gil	Tomateros de Culiacán	4–0	38–30

=== Caribbean Series championships ===
The Charros have won the Caribbean Series championship once, defeating the Tomateros de Culiacán, by a final score of 12-11 in ten innings when the city hosted in 2026.

Year	Manager	Record
(Mexico) 2026	Benjamin Gil	5–1

== Roster ==
Charros de Jalisco roster
Players		Coaches
Pitchers: 60 (Mexico) Miguel Aguilar; 55 (Mexico) Manny Barreda; 29 (United States) Trevor Clifton; 71 (United States) Max Green; 87 (United States) Zac Grotz; 89 (Dominican Republic) Reymin Guduan; 46 (Cuba) Bruce Hernández; -- (United States) Kurt Heyer; 49 (United States) Jake Jewell; -- (Dominican Republic) Jhan Mariñez; 25 (United States) Greg Minier; 45 (Cuba) Ariel Miranda; 18 (United States) McKinley Moore; 66 (Mexico) Luis Morán; 29 (United States) Andrew Pérez; -- (United States) A.J. Puckett; 37 (Mexico) Juan Robles; 54 (Mexico) Luis Iván Rodríguez; 79 (Mexico) Sasagi Sánchez; 72 (Mexico) Eduardo Vera; 58 (Mexico) Luis Villavicencio	Catchers: 85 (Mexico) Jesus Córdova; 4 (Venezuela) José Herrera; 8 (Mexico) Alfredo Hurtado; -- (Mexico) Julián León; Infielders: 22 (United States) Joshua Fuentes; 3 (United States) Mateo Gil; 55 (Mexico) Irving Lopez; -- (Mexico) Luis Carlos Martínez; 7 (United States) Alex Mejia; 98 (Mexico) David Mosqueda; -- (United States) Jared Walsh; 26 (United States) Michael Wielansky; Outfielders: 87 (Mexico) José Aguilar; 16 (Mexico) Carlos Báez; 40 (United States) Willie Calhoun; 48 (Puerto Rico) Johneshwy Fargas; 41 (United States) Kyle Garlick; 80 (Dominican Republic) Gilberto Jiménez; 69 (United States) Alejandro Quezada; 15 (United States) Dwight Smith Jr.	Manager: 30 (Mexico) Benji Gil; Coaches: 1 (Mexico) Luis Borges; 37 (Mexico) Miguel Duarte (pitching); 3 (Mexico) Fernando Elizondo (third base); 33 (Mexico) Gerardo Garza (catchers); 47 (Mexico) Julio César Miranda (pitching); 40 (Mexico) Jesús Moreno (pitching); Roster updated on 4 August 2026
