= Masaru Nakamura =

Japanese baseball player (born 1991)

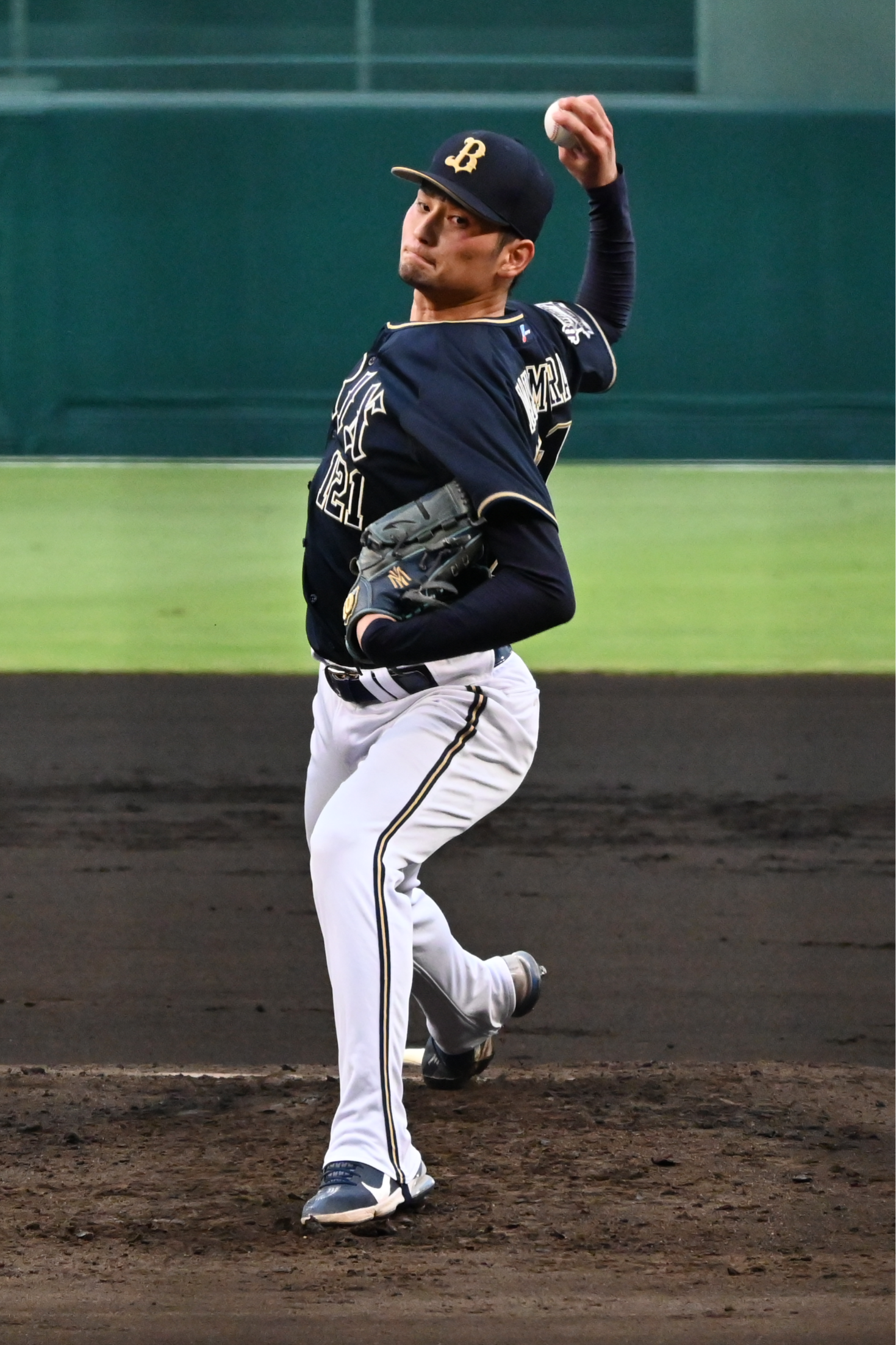

Free agent
- Pitcher
- Born: December 11, 1991 (age 34); Kasukabe, Saitama, Japan
- Bats: Right Throws: Right

NPB debut
- August 11, 2010, for the Hokkaido Nippon-Ham Fighters

Career statistics (through 2022 season)
- Win-Loss: 15–18
- ERA: 4.17
- Strikeouts: 154
- Stats at Baseball Reference

Teams
- Hokkaido Nippon-Ham Fighters (2010–2019); Orix Buffaloes (2022)

Career highlights and awards
- Japan Series champion (2022)

Masaru Nakamura (中村 勝, Nakamura Masaru) (born December 11, 1991) is a Japanese professional baseball pitcher who is a free agent. He has previously played in Nippon Professional Baseball (NPB) for the Hokkaido Nippon-Ham Fighters and Orix Buffaloes.

== Career ==
=== Hokkaido Nippon-Ham Fighters ===
Nakamura debuted for the Hokkaido Nippon-Ham Fighters on August 11, 2010. He had 18 strikeouts in 2013 for the Hokkaido Nippon-Ham Fighters. Through 2016 with the Fighters, Nakamura had a 14-16 with a 3.89 ERA and 146 strikeouts. Nakamura did not return to the Fighters after a 2019 season in which he allowed 6 runs in only 2.0 innings of work. In parts of 9 seasons, Nakamura recorded a 15-17 record with a 4.07 ERA and 150 strikeouts.

Nakamura signed on to play for the Brisbane Bandits in the Australian Baseball League for the 2020/2021 season.

=== Mariachis de Guadalajara ===
On February 19, 2021, Nakamura signed with the Mariachis de Guadalajara of the Mexican League. Nakamura made 9 appearances, all starts, for Guadalajara in 2021, recording a 3.25 ERA with 46 strikeouts in 52 2/3 innings of work. Nakamura was voted the LMB Pitcher of the Year following the season.

=== Orix Buffaloes ===
On February 23, 2022, Nakamura signed a one-year, training player contract with the Orix Buffaloes of Nippon Professional Baseball.
