= Jaguares de Nayarit =

Mexican baseball team

Logo	Cap insignia

Information
- League: Mexican Pacific League
- Location: Tepic, Nayarit
- Ballpark: Estadio Coloso Don Alejo Peralta
- Founded: 2025
- Colors: Dark blue, orange and white
- President: Carlos Peralta
- Manager: Luis Carlos Rivera
- Website: jaguaresdenayarit.com

Current uniforms
Home	Away

The Jaguares de Nayarit (English: Nayarit Jaguars) are a professional baseball team based in Tepic, Nayarit, Mexico. They will compete in the Mexican Pacific League (LMP) starting from the 2025–26 season. The team will play at the Estadio Coloso Don Alejo Peralta with a capacity of 9,480 seated spectators.

== History ==
In November 2023, the Government of the State of Nayarit announced that, in collaboration with the federal government of Mexico, it was building a baseball stadium in Tepic, the state capital, with the goal of joining the Mexican Pacific League, one of the two professional baseball leagues in Mexico, alongside the Mexican League. The proposed team name was Jaguares de Nayarit.

The stadium, Estadio Coloso Don Alejo Peralta, with a capacity of 9,480 spectators, was inaugurated during the 2024 WBSC Premier12, as one of the two Group A venues, hosted by Mexico, alongside the Estadio Panamericano de Béisbol in Zapopan, Jalisco.

In March 2025, Miguel Ángel Navarro Quintero, Governor of Nayarit, announced that it was "100% certain" that the state would have a team in the Mexican Pacific League for the upcoming season. Later that month, rumors circulated that the Sultanes de Monterrey might leave the LMP, with the Nayarit team expected to take their place.

In April 2025, the Mexican Pacific League approved the sale of the Sultanes, clearing the way for the franchise’s relocation to Tepic under the ownership of Carlos Peralta, former owner of the Mexican League’s Tigres de Quintana Roo. On 20 May 2025, the league officially announced that the Jaguares de Nayarit would join the competition for the 2025–26 season. On 3 July 2025, the team presented Luis Carlos Rivera as their manager. Later, in September, José Macías and Armando Araiza joined as the hitting and catching coaches, respectively.

The Jaguares made their LMP debut on 15 October 2025, losing 4–6 to the Venados de Mazatlán in a game played at Estadio Coloso del Pacífico. The losing pitcher for Nayarit was Faustino Carrera.

== Roster ==
Jaguares de Nayarit roster
Active roster		Coaches
Pitchers: 99 (Mexico) Faustino Carrera; 17 (Mexico) Alex Delgado; 13 (United States) Robert Dugger; 18 (Panama) Sadrac Franco; 10 (Mexico) Marco Fregozo; 71 (Mexico) Antonio Garzón; 12 (United States) Stephen Gonsalves; 81 (Mexico) Porfirio Guerrero; 77 (United States) Tyler Jandron; 73 (Mexico) Carlos Medina; 95 (Mexico) Carlos Morales; 58 (Mexico) Jonathan Partida; 45 (United States) Jeremy Rhoades; 27 (Mexico) Omar Sainz	Catchers: 29 (Mexico) José Félix; 82 (Mexico) César Mendoza; 28 (Mexico) Ricardo Valenzuela; Infielders: 7 (Mexico) Ciro Norzagaray; 62 (Mexico) Luis Santos; 8 (Mexico) Carlos Sepúlveda; 5 (Mexico) Niko Vásquez; 98 (United States) Justin Wylie; Outfielders: 15 (Mexico) Daniel Cornejo; 91 (Mexico) Joel Flores; 50 (United States) Jacob Rhinesmith; 59 (Mexico) José Manuel Orozco; 2 (Mexico) Randy Romero; 20 (Mexico) Brandon Villarreal; 74 (United States) Aaron Zavala	Manager: (Mexico) Luis Carlos Rivera; Coaches: (Mexico) Armando Araiza (catchers); (Panama) José Macías (hitting); Roster updated on 22 December 2025
