= Alejo Peralta =

Baseball executive

Alejo Peralta y Díaz Cevallos (5 May 1916 in Puebla – 8 April 1997 in Mexico City) founded the Mexico City Tigers baseball team (now known as the Tigres de Quintana Roo) in 1955. He was a well-known businessman at the time.

Among his relatives are Carlos Peralta, who is a businessman too, and television hostess Olivia Peralta, as well as formerly her mother, Olivia Leyva, an actress, television presenter and model.
