= Leo Heras =

Mexican baseball player (born 1990)

Acereros de Monclova – No. 3
- Outfielder
- Born: May 29, 1990 (age 36); Tijuana, Baja California, Mexico
- Bats: Left Throws: Right
- Stats at Baseball Reference

Career highlights and awards
- Mexican League batting champion (2021)

Leonardo Heras Aripez (born May 29, 1990) is a Mexican professional baseball outfielder for the Acereros de Monclova of the Mexican League.

== Career ==
=== Potros de Tijuana ===
Heras began his career in 2007 with the Potros de Tijuana of the Mexican League. He played in 89 games for the club across two seasons before signing with the Broncos de Reynosa for the 2009 season.

=== Broncos de Reynosa ===
Heras hit .330 with 46 RBI in 2009 with Reynosa, and .316 with 55 RBI in 2010 before electing free agency.

=== Diablos Rojos del México ===
On March 11, 2011, Heras signed with the Diablos Rojos del México. He hit .342/.399/.536 in 102 games for Mexico in 2011, and in 112 games in 2012, he slashed .323/.398/.556 with a career-high 24 home runs. On February 15, 2013, Heras signed a minor league contract with the San Diego Padres organization, but quickly returned to the Diablos on March 20.

=== Houston Astros ===
On August 13, 2013, Heras and Japhet Amador were traded to the Houston Astros organization and he reported to the Corpus Christi Hooks of the Double-A Texas League. Heras was invited to spring training for the 2014 season but did not make the club and was assigned to Double-A to begin the season. Heras spent the year in Corpus Christi, slashing .236/.354/.364 in 96 contests. The next year, Heras split the season between Corpus Christi and the Triple-A Fresno Grizzlies, batting a combined .239/.325/.362 with five home runs in 86 games. He played in an exhibition game in Mexico in 2016. After beginning the season with Fresno, Heras was loaned to the Diablos Rojos del México, where he finished the year.

=== Leones de Yucatán ===
The Astros released Heras after the 2016 season, and he signed with the Leones de Yucatán of the Mexican League. He batted .293/.363/.434 in 95 games for Yucatán in 2017. After the season on December 13, Heras was traded to the Acereros de Monclova, who traded him back to the Leones on February 12, 2018. He hit 9 home runs with the club in 2018 and batted .278/.394/.479 in 102 games in 2019.

Heras did not play in a game in 2020 due to the cancellation of the Mexican League season because of the COVID-19 pandemic.

=== Mariachis de Guadalajara ===
On February 23, 2021, Heras was traded to the Mariachis de Guadalajara of the Mexican League. In 46 games, he batted .401/.457/.682 with nine home runs and 42 RBI; he was awarded the LMB Batting Champion after finishing the season with the highest average.

Heras returned to Guadalajara to begin the 2022 season. In 55 games, he batted .360/.406/.600 with 12 home runs and 27 RBI.

=== Olmecas de Tabasco ===
On August 1, 2022, Heras was traded to the Olmecas de Tabasco of the Mexican League in exchange for P Ricardo Green. In six games, he went 8-for-18 at the plate with one home run and six RBI.

In 2023, Heras made 67 appearances for Tabasco, slashing .304/.370/.448 with four home runs and 27 RBI.

In 2024, Heras made 56 appearances for Tabasco, hitting .278/.368/.399 with two home runs and 16 RBI.

In 2025, Heras made 50 appearances for Tabasco, batting .235/.396/.361 with two home runs and 17 RBI.

In 2026, Heras made only eight appearances for the team, and slashed .278/.480/.667 with two home runs and three RBI.

=== Acereros de Monclova ===
On July 4, 2026, Heras was traded to the Acereros de Monclova of the Mexican League in exchange for Luis González.
