= Eric Filia =

American baseball player (born 1992)

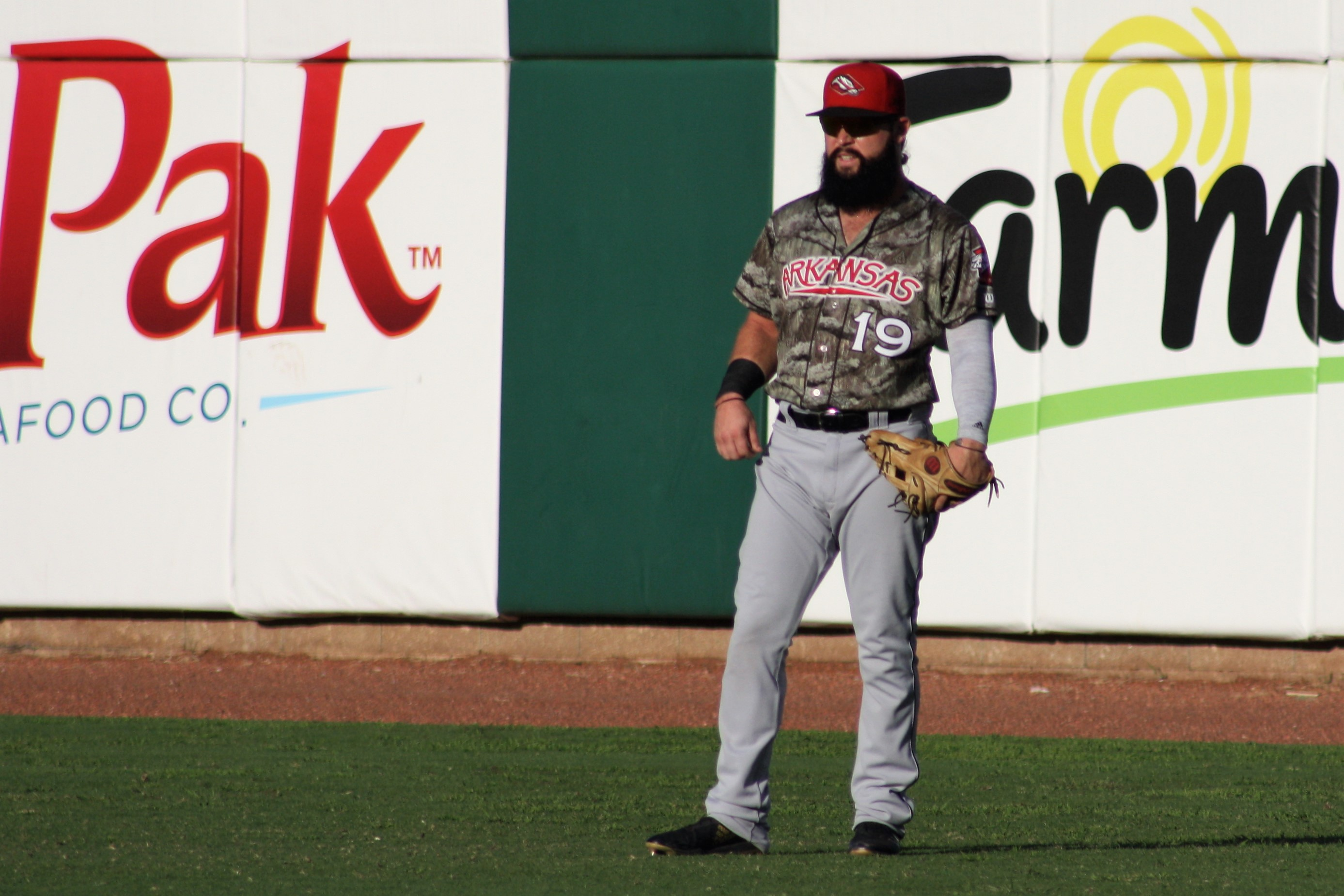
- Filia with the Arkansas Travelers

Fargo-Moorhead RedHawks – No. 5
- Outfielder
- Born: July 6, 1992 (age 34); Carlsbad, California, U.S.
- Bats: Left Throws: Right
Medals
Men's baseball
Representing United States
Olympic Games
Silver medal – second place	2020 Tokyo	Team

Eric Robert Filia (born July 6, 1992), formerly known as Eric Snyder, is an American professional baseball outfielder for the Fargo-Moorhead RedHawks of the American Association of Professional Baseball. He played internationally for the United States national baseball team at the 2020 Olympics.

== Amateur career ==
Filia graduated from Edison High School in Huntington Beach, California. As a freshman, he had a .500 batting average for the baseball team, tying a school record set by Jeff Kent, and set a school record for hits. He became at the time of his graduation, 2011, was 7th all time in California in hits. He enrolled at the University of California, Los Angeles (UCLA), where he played college baseball for the UCLA Bruins. He was a member of the 2013 College World Series champions, and had five runs batted in during the decisive game.

After the 2013 college season, Filia played collegiate summer baseball for the Yarmouth–Dennis Red Sox in Cape Cod Baseball League, and tore the labrum in his right shoulder, causing him to miss the 2014 season. He took a redshirt in 2014, and was suspended for the 2014–15 academic year for plagiarizing a paper. While he was suspended from UCLA, Filia worked as a butler at the Playboy Mansion. He played summer collegiate baseball for the Kenosha Kingfish in the Northwoods League in 2015.

== Professional career ==
=== Seattle Mariners ===
The Seattle Mariners selected Filia in the 20th round of the 2016 MLB draft. He played for the Everett AquaSox winning the league MVP. Then playing for the Modesto Nuts in 2017 where he went on to win the HIGH -A California league championship. After the 2017 season, the Mariners assigned him to the Arizona Fall League, where he earned the Dernell Stenson Sportsmanship Award. Hitting over .400. Filia was suspended for 50 games during the 2018 season for his second positive test for a drug of abuse. After his suspension, he joined the Arkansas Travelers, before the Mariners traded Filia to the Boston Red Sox as the player to be named later from the Roenis Elías trade. He failed his physical exam with the Red Sox and was returned to Seattle, with the Red Sox acquiring cash considerations instead.

Before the 2019 season, Filia was suspended for 100 games for his third positive drug test. He played for the Tacoma Rainiers in 2019 after his suspension, but did not play organized baseball in 2020 because of the cancellation of the minor league season due to the COVID-19 pandemic. Filia began the 2021 season with Tacoma. Filia spent the 2021 season with Triple-A Tacoma. On November 1, 2021, Filia was released by the Mariners organization.

=== Guerreros de Oaxaca ===
After taking the 2022 season off, on January 18, 2023, Filia signed with the Guerreros de Oaxaca of the Mexican League. In 52 games, he batted .361/.461/.513 with five home runs and 19 RBI. Filia was waived on July 3.

=== Acereros de Monclova ===
On July 4, 2023, Filia was claimed off waivers by the Acereros de Monclova of the Mexican League. In 29 appearances for Monclova, he batted .327/.425/.443 with two home runs and 21 RBI.

Filia made 83 appearances for Monclova during the 2024 campaign, slashing .280/.384/.363 with three home runs, 43 RBI, and six stolen bases.

=== Conspiradores de Querétaro ===
On February 5, 2025, Filia was traded to the Conspiradores de Querétaro. In 86 appearances for Querétaro, Filia batted .338/.448/.486 with nine home runs and 41 RBI.

=== Fargo-Moorhead RedHawks ===
On August 15, 2025, Filia signed with the Fargo-Moorhead RedHawks of the American Association of Professional Baseball. Filia made 11 appearances for the RedHawks, hitting .412/.542/.441 with five RBI and one stolen bases.

=== Acereros de Monclova (second stint) ===
On January 26, 2026, Filia was traded back to the Acereros de Monclova of the Mexican League. In 21 appearances for Monclova, he batted .241/.405/.345 with six doubles and six RBI.

=== Leones de Yucatán ===
On May 23, 2026, Filia was traded to the Leones de Yucatán of the Mexican League. Filia made 53 appearances for the Leones, slashing .320/.397/.395 with 21 RBI and one stolen base.

=== Fargo-Moorhead RedHawks (second stint) ===
On August 11, 2026, Filia signed with the Fargo-Moorhead RedHawks of the American Association of Professional Baseball.

== International career ==
Filia played for the United States national baseball team during qualification for baseball at the 2020 Summer Olympics, contested in 2021 in Tokyo. After the team qualified, he was named to the Olympics roster on July 2. The team went on to win silver, falling to Japan in the gold-medal game.
