= Darel Torres =

Mexican baseball player (born 1999)

Dorados de Chihuahua
- Pitcher
- Born: 5 January 1999 (age 27); Los Mochis, Sinaloa, Mexico
- Bats: Right Throws: Right
Medals
Men's baseball
Representing Mexico
Pan American Games
Bronze medal – third place	2023 Santiago	Team

Darel Rubén Torres Valdez (born 5 January 1999) is a Mexican professional baseball pitcher for the Dorados de Chihuahua of the Mexican League. He represented Mexico at the 2023 Pan American Games, where he won the bronze medal.

== Professional career ==
=== Texas Rangers ===
On 7 July 2015, Torres signed with the Texas Rangers organization; he was assigned to the DSL Rangers in the rookie-level Dominican Summer League, where he made his professional debut the following year. In four seasons with the team, he appeared in 41 games, recording an 8-5 record and 1.98 ERA with 104 strikeouts and 12 saves across 109 innings pitched.

Torres did not play in a game in 2020 due to the cancellation of the minor league season because of the COVID-19 pandemic. He was released by the Rangers organization on 4 May 2021.

=== Tigres de Quintana Roo ===
On 4 June 2021, Torres signed with the Tigres de Quintana Roo of the Mexican League (LMB). He appeared in seven games as a reliever during his LMB debut season. The following season, in 2022, Torres was promoted to a starting role, appearing in 24 games and recording seven wins and four losses. In 2023, he appeared in 17 games, posting a 6–6 record and leading the league in strikeouts with 100.

=== Dorados de Chihuahua ===
On 12 June 2025, Torres was traded to the Dorados de Chihuahua of the Mexican League (LMB). He appeared in eight games with the team, recording four wins and three losses with a 3.61 ERA.

On 18 December 2025, Torres re-signed with the Dorados.

=== Cañeros de Los Mochis ===
Torres made her debut in the Mexican Pacific League (LMP) in the 2017–18 season with the Cañeros de Los Mochis. He appeared in two games as a reliever and recorded a 27.00 ERA. The next season, 2018–19, he appeared in 21 games and finished the season with a 5.60 ERA.

== International career ==
In October 2023, Torres was selected to represent Mexico at the 2023 Pan American Games contested in Santiago, Chile, where the team won the bronze medal. He appeared in two games during the tournament. He started against Panama, pitching 4.0 scoreless innings, allowing two hits, issuing three walks and striking out seven. His second appearance also came against Panama, this time as a reliever in the bronze medal game, relieving Luis Fernando Miranda and working 1.2 scoreless innings, allowing two hits and striking out one batter.
