= Carlos Peralta (businessman) =

Mexican businessman (born 1951)

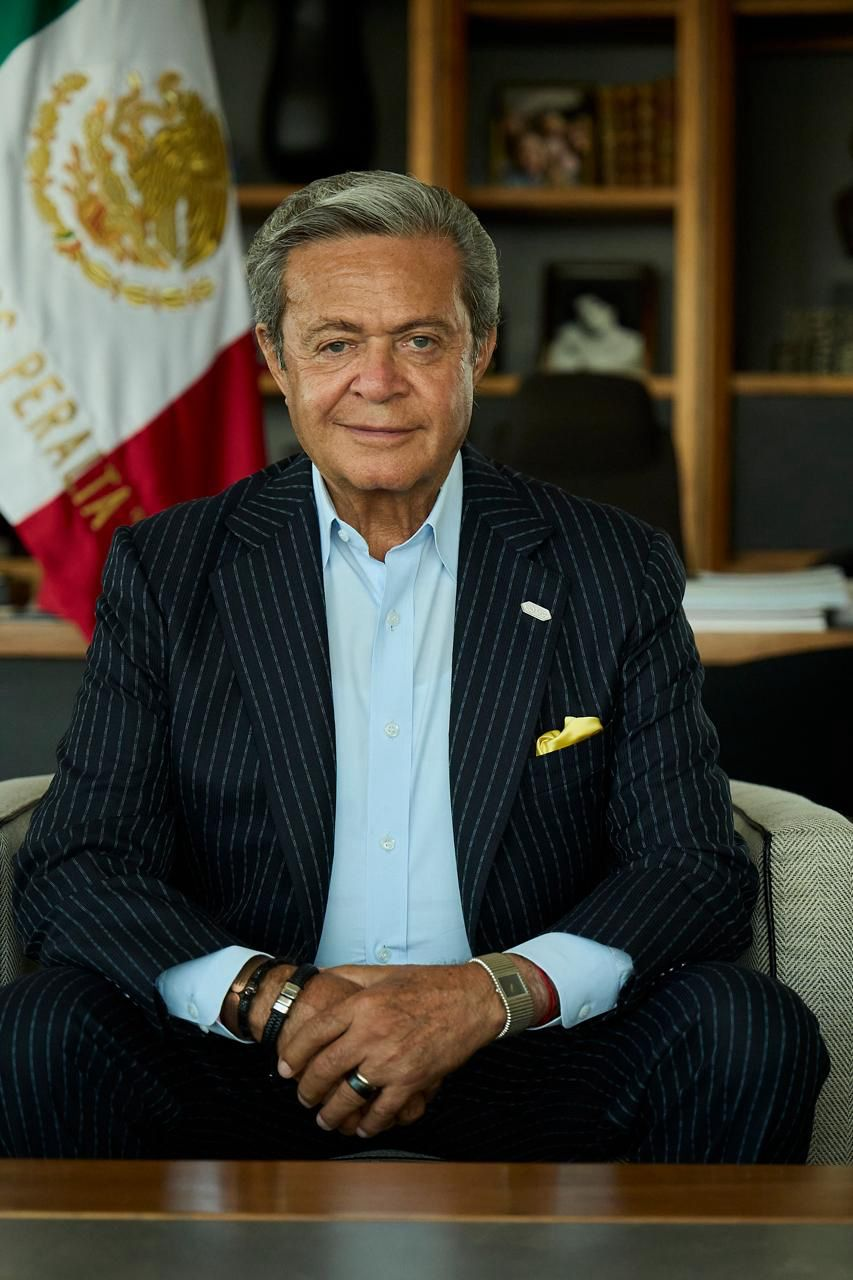
- Peralta in 2025
- Born: 6 December 1951 (age 74); Mexico City, Mexico
- Education: Bachelor's degree in Engineering, ICM Institute of Mexico
- Occupations: Businessman, baseball executive
- Spouse(s): Olivia Leyva (divorced); Mariana Tort
- Children: 4, including Olivia

Carlos Peralta Quintero is a Mexican businessman, investor, and philanthropist, President, and Chairman of Grupo IUSA. He owns the baseball club Jaguares de Nayarit of the Mexican Pacific League and previously owned the Tigres de Quintana Roo of the Mexican League (LMB).

== Business career ==
Grupo IUSA is a third-generation family-owned conglomerate founded more than eight decades ago. The group operates through a number of companies in several industrial sectors and has become one of the largest industrial groups in Latin America. Under the leadership of Carlos Peralta, Grupo IUSA expanded its business portfolio and international presence, commercializing more than 6,000 certified products across more than 20 sectors in over 30 countries. The group reports annual sales of approximately US$1 billion and employs around 10,000 people.

Peralta began working at Industrias Unidas S.A. in October 1968 as an operator in the electrical department. During his career within the company he held several positions in both production and administrative divisions, eventually becoming Executive Vice-President in 1984. In 1997, he assumed the position of Chairman of the Board of Directors of Grupo IUSA.

Grupo IUSA’s core activities include the manufacturing of products for the electricity, water and gas industries. The company's portfolio includes more than 6,000 products such as high- and medium-voltage cables, transformers, valves, photovoltaic solar panels, electrical devices, water heaters and LED lighting systems.

== Philanthropy ==
Peralta has supported philanthropic initiatives primarily through projects linked to the industrial operations of Grupo IUSA in Pastejé, in the State of Mexico. In that region he supported the creation of three day-care centers for the children of workers at the industrial complex, as well as a school that provides free K–12 education for the local community. The school focuses on technical education and workforce preparation, and has sought to promote opportunities for indigenous communities in the region, including the Mazahua.

In 1997, Peralta founded the Fundación Ingeniero Alejo Peralta y Díaz Ceballos in honor of his father, Alejo Peralta. The foundation promotes programs in education, culture, science and technology, and has also participated in humanitarian assistance following natural disasters.

Through its initiatives, the foundation has supported housing reconstruction projects in municipalities affected by hurricanes, earthquakes and floods in the Mexican states of Oaxaca, Guerrero and Puebla. It has also provided assistance programs for low-income elderly people and children with chronic illnesses, including cancer, AIDS and diabetes.

== Sports involvement ==
Peralta and President Enrique Peña Nieto in 2013 after the Tigres de Quintana Roo won the Mexican Baseball League championship

=== Baseball ===
Baseball has been closely associated with the Peralta family for several decades. Peralta's father, Alejo Peralta, was among the early promoters of professional baseball in Mexico and played a role in the development of the Mexican League.

The family has been linked to the Tigres de Quintana Roo franchise, one of the most successful teams in Mexican professional baseball, which has won multiple national championships. The franchise was sold in 2017.

In 2025, Peralta acquired the Jaguares de Nayarit, a professional baseball team that competes in the Mexican Pacific League.

=== Golf ===
Peralta has promoted the development of golf in Mexico. He was involved in the construction of two professional golf courses designed by Robert Von Hagge: La Vista Country Club in the state of Puebla and Bosque Real Country Club in the State of Mexico.

He also helped bring international professional tournaments to Mexico. The first official Senior PGA Tour event in the country was held at La Vista Golf Course in 2002. The same tournament was later hosted at Bosque Real Country Club in 2003 and 2004.

Bosque Real Country Club also hosted an LPGA Tour tournament in 2005, 2006, 2007, 2009 and 2010.

=== Automobile collecting ===
Peralta has also been known for his interest in motorsports and automobile collecting. Over several decades, the Peralta family assembled a collection of more than 140 classic and high-performance automobiles.

He has also supported automotive events in Mexico, including the Pastejé Automotive Invitational, an event dedicated to classic and luxury automobiles.

== Honours and awards ==
=== Business ===
- Excellence and Business Trajectory Award (2019), granted by the Latin American Institute of Quality (INLAC).
- National Engineering Award in the category of Communications and Electronics (2019), granted by the Mexican Senate and the College of Communications and Electronics Engineers (CICE).
- Businessman of the Year (2015), awarded by MIREC.

=== Philanthropy ===
- Shimon Peres Award (2020), for contributions to the development of education in Mexico.
- Doctor Honoris Causa from Newport University (2000), for humanitarian work.

=== Sports ===
- Businessman of the Year, awarded by the Mexican League (LMB) in 2000, 2001, 2005, 2011 and 2015.
