= Willie Romero =

Venezuelan baseball player and coach (born 1974)

- Pitcher / Coach / Manager
- Born: August 5, 1974 (age 52); Maracay, Aragua, Venezuela
- Bats: Right Throws: Right

Wilfredo Romero (born August 5, 1974) is a Venezuelan professional baseball coach and former outfielder. He has managed extensively in Mexico and Venezuela.

== Playing career ==
Romero played several season of minor league baseball, mainly in the Los Angeles Dodgers organization, as well as in the Mexican League (LMB). With Saraperos de Saltillo, he won the Mexican League batting title in 2002, posting a .387 batting average. He also played 20 winter league seasons in the Venezuelan Professional Baseball League (LVBP) between 1992 and 2012, with Leones del Caracas, Navegantes del Magallanes, Tigres de Aragua, Tiburones de La Guaira, and Águilas del Zulia.

== Coaching career ==
After a stint as a player-manager in the Mexican League with the Leones de Yucatán in 2012, Romero turned to coaching full-time with the Acereros de Monclova (2013). He returned to Yucatan in 2015 as manager, remaining there until he was fired in 2017 after an altercation with a fan in the stands. He later managed in the Mexican League for the Pericos de Puebla in 2023 and the Olmecas de Tabasco in 2025. In 2024, he managed the Tri-City Dust Devils, the High-A affiliate of the Los Angeles Angels. After being fired from Olmecas partway through the 2025 season, he rejoined Yucatán's coaching staff. On July 29, 2025, Romero was promoted to the role of bench coach; the move was made after Oswaldo Morejón was fired and Eliézer Alfonzo was promoted to manager.

As manager of Navegantes del Magallanes in the 2021–22 season, he led the team, which lacked any players signed to Major League Baseball contracts, to a LVBP championship after defeating Caribes de Anzoátegui in seven games. However, he did not return the following year after being unable to agree on a contract, and was replaced by Yadier Molina.

Romero has earned five separate Manager of the Year honors in three different leagues: in 2015 and 2016 in the Mexican League, in 2017 in the Mexican Pacific League, and in 2022 and 2023 in Venezuela. With Aragua in 2023, he became the third manager to win the distinction in consecutive seasons, (along with Luis Dorante and Alfredo Pedrique) and the first to do so with different teams.

On July 1, 2025, Romero was named manager of the Tucson-based team which will be the first American team to compete in the Mexican Pacific League.

On January 6, 2026, Romero was hired to serve as the bench coach for the Saraperos de Saltillo of the Mexican League. He was promoted to the role of interim manager following the firing of Mendy López on May 6. On June 2, Romero was fired by the Saraperos.
