= Matías Carrillo =

Mexican baseball player (born 1963)

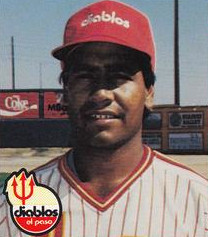
- Carrillo in 1988

Pericos de Puebla
- Outfielder / Manager
- Born: 24 February 1963 (age 63); Los Mochis, Sinaloa, Mexico
- Batted: Left Threw: Left

MLB debut
- May 23, 1991, for the Milwaukee Brewers

Last MLB appearance
- August 10, 1994, for the Florida Marlins

MLB statistics
- Batting average: .251
- Home runs: 0
- Runs batted in: 12
- Stats at Baseball Reference

Teams
- Milwaukee Brewers (1991); Florida Marlins (1993–1994)

Career highlights and awards
- 52nd major-league player to have been born in Mexico.; Mexican League Rookie of the Year (1982); Mexican League batting champion (1996); Tigres de Quintana Roo #24 retired

Member of the Mexican Professional

Baseball Hall of Fame
- Induction: 2020

Matías Carrillo García (born 24 February 1963) is a Mexican professional baseball manager and former outfielder who currently serves as a coach for the Pericos de Puebla of the Mexican League. He played three seasons in Major League Baseball (MLB) for the Milwaukee Brewers and Florida Marlins. Carrillo also spent 22 seasons in the Mexican League and 27 in the Mexican Pacific League.

== Professional career ==
Carrillo, known as El Coyote, was born on 24 February 1963 in Los Mochis, Sinaloa and made his professional debut with the Petroleros de Poza Rica in 1982, winning the Rookie of the Year Award. He later debuted in the 1982–83 Mexican Pacific League season playing for the Ostioneros de Guaymas. In 1984, Carrillo was signed by the Tigres Capitalinos.

After spending three seasons with the Denver Zephyrs, Carrillo made his MLB debut on 23 May 1991 playing for the Milwaukee Brewers.

In 1993, Carrillo was signed by the Florida Marlins and played his last MLB game on 10 August 1994.

In 1995, Carrillo returned to the Mexican League, where he played for the Tigres until his retirement in 2009. He also played winter baseball in the Mexican Pacific League for the Cañeros de Los Mochis.

After his retirement on 26 July 2009, Tigres de Quintana Roo retired his uniform number 24.

In 2020, Carrillo was inducted into the Mexican Professional Baseball Hall of Fame receiving the most votes amongst the class of 2020.

In February 2025, Carrillo was selected by a committee of journalists as the right fielder for the Mexican League Centennial All-Time Team on the occasion of the league's hundredth anniversary.

== Managing career ==
From 2009 to 2013, Carrillo managed the Tigres de Quintana Roo of the Mexican Baseball League, winning the Manager of the Year Award in 2011.

On 23 July 2013, Carrillo joined Leones de Yucatán as the team's manager. On 17 December 2014, he was hired to serve as the hitting coach for the Saraperos de Saltillo.

On 11 May 2015, Carrillo became the manager of the Pericos de Puebla; he was replaced by Cory Snyder in June 2016.

On 31 May 2022, Carrillo was appointed as manager of the Acereros de Monclova, replacing Mickey Callaway. He was not retained following the season.

He was named manager of El Águila de Veracruz for the 2023 season. However, he was fired on June 23, 2023, after a 23–28 start to the season.

In 2024, Carrillo was appointed manager of the Bravos de León. He was dismissed on 6 May 2025, after starting the season with a 6–9 record; he was replaced by Miguel Tejada.

On 22 May 2025, Carrillo was hired as coach for the Dorados de Chihuahua of the Mexican League. He was fired by the team on 10 July.

On 15 July 2025, Carrillo was hired to serve as part of the coaching staff for the Pericos de Puebla of the Mexican League.
