= Benji Gil =

Mexican baseball player and manager (born 1972)

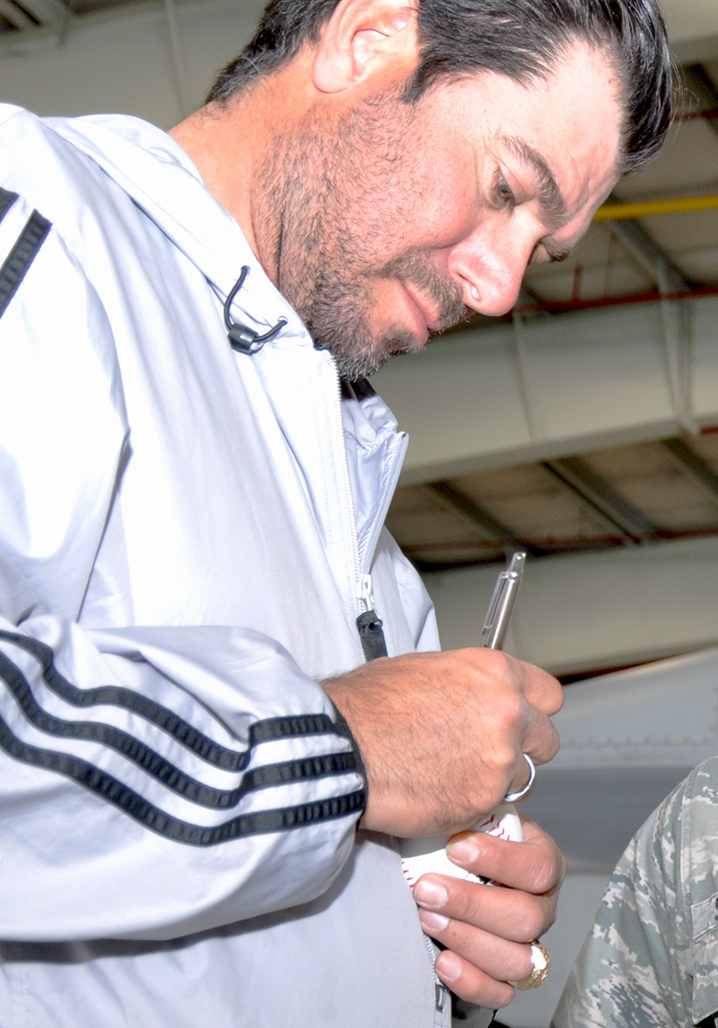
- Gil at Naval Air Station Joint Reserve Base Fort Worth in 2013

Diablos Rojos del México – No. 30
- Infielder / Coach / Manager
- Born: October 6, 1972 (age 54); Tijuana, Mexico
- Batted: Right Threw: Right

MLB debut
- April 5, 1993, for the Texas Rangers

Last MLB appearance
- July 31, 2003, for the Anaheim Angels

MLB statistics
- Batting average: .237
- Home runs: 32
- Runs batted in: 171
- Stats at Baseball Reference

Teams
- As player: Texas Rangers (1993, 1995–1997); Anaheim Angels (2000–2003); As coach: Los Angeles Angels (2022–2023)

Career highlights and awards
- World Series champion (2002)
Medals
Men's baseball
Representing Mexico
Pan American Games
Bronze medal – third place	2007 Rio de Janeiro	Team
Manager for Mexico
World Baseball Classic
Bronze medal – third place	2023 Miami	Team

Romar Benjamín Gil Aguilar (born October 6, 1972) is a Mexican former professional baseball infielder and coach who currently serves as the manager for the Diablos Rojos del México of the Mexican League and the Charros de Jalisco of the Mexican Pacific League. He played in Major League Baseball (MLB) for the Texas Rangers and the Anaheim Angels with whom he won the 2002 World Series. He was previously the infield coach for the Los Angeles Angels.

Gil has served as manager of the Mexico national baseball team in the 2020 Summer Olympics, the 2023 World Baseball Classic, and the 2026 World Baseball Classic. He has also managed the Tomateros de Culiacán and the Charros de Jalisco, both in the Mexican Pacific League.

== Early career ==
Gil was a star pitcher for Castle Park High School in Chula Vista, California. In 1990, he went 6–3 with 89 strikeouts and a San Diego County leading 0.52 earned run average. As a senior in 1991, Gil pitched a no-hitter. Gil was also a good hitter, however, and when the Texas Rangers selected Gil nineteenth overall in the 1991 Major League Baseball draft, it was as a shortstop.

== Professional career ==
=== Texas Rangers ===
Gil displayed decent power, clubbing nine home runs for the South Atlantic League's Gastonia Rangers in 1992. He made his major league debut in the 1993 season opener at twenty years old, going 0-for-3 with a walk in four plate appearances. By late May, however, he was back in the minors with the Double-A Tulsa Drillers after batting .123 with two runs batted in for the Rangers.

He would not return to the majors until the 1995 season. On May 3, his first major league home run accounted for the Rangers' lone run in a 5–1 loss to the Seattle Mariners. He followed this up with home runs in his next two games on his way to a career best nine for the season. He also appeared in a career high 130 games, and posted career highs in runs batted in (46), runs (36), hits (91) and extra-base hits (32), while also providing a steady glove at short (.974 fielding percentage, and a league-leading 5.18 range factor per nine innings as a shortstop).

A herniated disc in Spring training kept Gil off the 1996 opening day roster. By the time he was ready to return, off-season acquisition Kevin Elster had won the starting job, and Gil found himself back in the minors with the Oklahoma City 89ers. He received a call up to the majors that September, and was 2-for-5 in seven plate appearances. He was once again the Rangers' starting shortstop in 1997.

=== Calgary Cannons ===
Gil was traded following the 1997 season to the Chicago White Sox for pitchers Al Levine and Larry Thomas. Gil spent his one season in the White Sox organization with the Pacific Coast League's Calgary Cannons, where he batted .248 with 14 home runs and 69 RBIs (a career high for Gil at any level). Gil also spent the 1999 season with Calgary after it became a Florida Marlins affiliate, and he was drafted by the Marlins in the 1998 minor league draft.

=== Anaheim Angels ===
Just as spring training 2000 was set to begin, Gil signed as a free agent with the Anaheim Angels. Slated to be the backup to incumbent Gary DiSarcina, Gil soon found himself starting when an injury ended DiSarcina's season. David Eckstein became the Angels' starting shortstop in 2001, with Gil sliding into a backup middle infielder role.

In 2002, Gil actually saw more playing time at second base than he did at short. He had a far more limited role than he had his previous two seasons in Anaheim, however, he made it to the postseason for the only time in his career. In game two of the 2002 American League Division Series against the New York Yankees, Gil had an RBI single off Andy Petitte. In game four, he was 3-for-3 with a run scored. In the Angels' 2002 World Series victory over the San Francisco Giants, Gil went 4-for-5 with a double and a run scored.

=== Minor League journeyman ===
Gil's 2003 season got off to a slow start, going 0-for-14. The Angels released him in early August with a .192 batting average, one home run and nine RBIs. Shortly afterwards, he signed with the Cleveland Indians. He was released at the end of the season after batting .139 for the Triple-A Buffalo Bisons. Over the next two seasons, Gil spent time in the Colorado Rockies, Chicago Cubs, Detroit Tigers, Seattle Mariners and New York Mets organizations, but failed to make the Major League roster of any of these teams. Along the way, he also landed on the Mexican League's Tijuana Toros.

When the Mets released Gil in July 2005, it would turn out to be his final stint with a major league franchise. After finishing out the 2005 season with the New Jersey Jackals of the Canadian-American Association, Gil would spend the next six seasons playing ball in Mexico. In 2007, he won the Mexican League Championship with Sultanes de Monterrey. He spent one last season with the Fort Worth Cats of the North American League before retiring.

== Career statistics ==
Games	PA	AB	Runs	Hits	2B	3B	HR	RBI	SB	BB	SO	HBP	Avg.	Slg.	Fld%
604	1767	1610	158	381	75	12	32	171	24	102	448	7	.237	.358	.966

Gil pitched once while in the Chicago Cubs organization, once in the Mets organization and once for the Jackals. He pitched a total of four innings, allowing two hits and no earned runs.

== Coaching career ==
=== Tomateros de Culiacán ===
Gil's coaching career began in 2014, as he became manager for the Tomateros de Culiacán of the Mexican Pacific League (LMP), a winter ball club where he previously played for 13 seasons and won six championships with. He led the team to a championship in his first season, and was later brought back for the 2015–16 season. In 2015, the Tomateros posted a disappointing 28–40 record and did not make the playoffs, leading to Gil's firing after the season. After another disappointing year in 2016, the Tomateros announced that Gil would return as manager for the 2017–18 season. The Tomateros won their second title under Gil, defeating the Mayos de Navojoa in the LMP Championship Series 4–3. After the season, Gil surprisingly announced he was stepping down as manager in order to attend to personal and family matters. However, Gil once again returned as manager following the 2018-19 season and went on to win back-to-back championships during the 2019–20 and 2020–21 seasons and missing a third championship in a row after losing game 7 of the 2021-22 LMP championship series.

=== Mariachis de Guadalajara ===
Gil was named the inaugural manager of the Mariachis de Guadalajara, an expansion franchise of the Mexican Baseball League (LMB) that began play in the 2021 season. He led them to a stellar 46–17 regular season record, a first-place finish in the LMB North division, and a playoff berth. However, the Mariachis fell to the eventual league-champion Toros de Tijuana in the North Division Championship Series. Gil was voted LMB Manager of the Year following the season.

=== Mexico national team ===
In 2021, Gil was selected as manager for the Mexico national team at the 2020 Summer Olympics. Mexico lost to the Dominican Republic, Japan, and Israel. He managed Mexico in both the 2023 and 2026 World Baseball Classics.

=== Los Angeles Angels ===
On January 5, 2022, Gil was announced as a new coach for the Los Angeles Angels for the 2022 season.

=== Charros de Jalisco ===
On November 28, 2023, Gil was announced as new manager for the Charros de Jalisco of the Mexican Pacific League. In 2024, he also became the manager for the club in the Mexican Baseball League after they acquired and replaced the Mariachis de Guadalajara franchise. He led the team to the LMB playoffs in three consecutive seasons, including an appearance in the Serie del Rey in 2025 where they were swept by the Diablos Rojos del México. Following the 2026 season, it was announced he would not return to manage the team in the LMB; however he will remain as manager for the LMP club.

=== Diablos Rojos del México ===
On October 15, 2026, Gil was announced as the new manager for the Diablos Rojos del México of the Mexican Baseball League (LMB) ahead of the 2027 season.

== Personal life ==
Gil was born in Tijuana, Mexico, and grew up in Chula Vista, California. His mother died while he was in high school. He and his wife, Carly, reside in Keller, Texas, with their two children, Mateo and Gehrig. Mateo was drafted in the third round of the 2018 Major League Baseball draft by the St. Louis Cardinals.
