= List of Atlantic League rosters =

American baseball league rosters

Below are the full rosters and coaching staff of the ten teams of Atlantic League of Professional Baseball.

== North Division ==
=== Hagerstown Flying Boxcars ===
Hagerstown Flying Boxcars roster
Active (25-man) roster	Coaching staff
Pitchers: -- Johnny Barbato; 25 Trey Braithwaite; 7 Mike Brewer; 28 Connor Curlis; 15 Eddy Demurias; 17 Jack Eisenbarger; 32 Jason Franks; 18 Clay Helvey; 33 DJ Johnson; 13 Tommy Kane; 16 Alex Mack; 9 Jameson McGrane; 14 Connor O'Hara; 5 Brennen Oxford; 22 Cole Roland; 27 Vincent Towns; 23 Chris Wright; Catchers: 2 Daniel Arroyo; 19 Robert Brooks; 29 Alex Isola; Infielders: 6 Osvaldo Abreu; 11 Bryce Cannon; -- Jordan Peyton; 8 Cristhian Rodriguez; 4 Jeffrey Wehler; Outfielders: 10 Jared Carr; 1 Marty Costes; 12 Tyler Williams	Manager: -- Mark Minicozzi; Coaches: -- Shane Turner (bench); -- Aharon Eggleston (hitting); Disabled list; ‡ Inactive list; § Suspended list; Roster updated May 3, 2026 Transactions

=== Lancaster Stormers ===
Lancaster Stormers roster
Active (25-man) roster	Coaching staff
Pitchers: 10 Nile Ball; 32 Caleb Baragar; 41 Noah Bremer; 36 Oscar De La Cruz; 1 Max Green; -- James Hoyt; -- Jack Labosky; 38 Nolan Long; 13 Brad Markey; 19 Junior Mieses; 15 Carter Raffield; -- Jackson Rees; 10 Joe Joe Rodriguez; 34 Ted Stuka; 3 Brady Tedesco; Catchers: 25 Antonio Barranca; 27 Jack Conley; 2 Chris Proctor; Infielders: 20 Joseph Carpenter; 9 Isan Díaz; 6 Trace Loehr; 8 Nick Lucky; 28 Cristian Santana; Outfielders: 11 Shawon Dunston Jr.; 7 Kyle Hess; 24 Gaige Howard; 12 Niko Hulsizer; 21 Trayvon Robinson; 30 Chad Sedio	Manager: 23 Ross Peeples; Coaches: 14 Jeff Bianchi (hitting); 37 Mark Johnson (pitching); 21 Trayvon Robinson (hitting); 22 Troy Steffy (first base); Jim Toole (clubhouse manager); Disabled list; ‡ Inactive list; § Suspended list; updated April 18, 2024 Transactions

=== Long Island Ducks ===
Long Island Ducks roster
Active roster	Coaching staff
Pitchers: 49 Scott Alexander; 55 Jacob Asa; 24 Nolan Clenney; 35 Garrett Crowley; 11 Michael Dominguez; 19 Harrison Francis; 40 Tanner Jacobson; 14 Ryan Langford; 52 Julian Minaya; 25 Angel Reyes; 44 Sal Romano; 23 Ryan Sandberg; 31 Kristian Scott; Catchers: 17 Gavin Collins; 50 Ronaldo Hernández; Infielders: 15 Marcus Chiu; 5 Austin Dennis; 29 Wilmer Difo; 34 Anthony García; 26 Kole Kaler; 32 Alsander Womack; Outfielders: 1 E.J. Cumbo; 41 Jorge Bonifacio; 2 Jacob Robson; 5 Chris Roller; 47 Aaron Takacs	Manager: 20 Lew Ford; Coaches: 21 Tim Battle Jr. (bench); 18 Bobby Blevins (pitching); Disabled list; ‡ Inactive list; § Suspended list; Roster updated July 1, 2026 Transactions

=== Staten Island FerryHawks ===
Staten Island FerryHawks roster
Active (25-man) roster	Coaching staff
Pitchers: -- Vincenzo Aiello; -- Christian Allegretti; -- Jim Fuller; -- Anthony Quattrocchi; 30 Eddy Reynoso; 10 Anthony Rodriguez; 24 Jordan Simpson; 3 Kelsie Whitmore; Catchers: -- Kevin Krause; 14 Justin O'Conner; Infielders: 6 Angel Aguilar; -- Luis Castro; -- Jack Elliot; -- Deibinson Romero; -- Jeff Wehler; Outfielders: -- Dominick Bucko; 2 Ricardo Cespedes; -- Mikey Edelman; -- Mitch Piatnik; -- Adam Purdy	Manager: -- Homer Bush; Coaches: -- Reggie Harris (pitching); Disabled list; ‡ Inactive list; § Suspended list; updated April 18, 2023 Transactions

=== York Revolution ===
York Revolution roster
Active roster	Coaching staff
Pitchers: 29 Shane Gray; 16 Hunter Gregory; 31 Rhett Kouba; 36 Dawson Lane; 34 Nick Mikolajchak; 40 Josh Mollerus; 27 Jordan Morales; 12 Jack Nedrow; 10 Hunter Parsons; 21 Nicholas Regalado; 1 Alonzo Richardson; 14 Joely Rodriguez; 13 Braden Scott; 33 Ryan Shreve; 2 Chris Vallimont; Catchers: 11 Eddie Arteaga; 18 Austin Bates; Infielders: 4 Ben Blackwell; 2 Josh Day; 9 Nick Dunn; 23 Brandon Lewis; 20 Jackson Ross; 22 Jacob Teter; Outfielders: 3 Devonte Brown; 7 Brian Ray; 6 Tomo Otosaka; 15 Mike Rosario	Manager: 43 Rick Forney; Coaches: 24 Joe Harris (Pitching); 44 Derek Wolf (Hitting); Disabled list; ‡ Inactive list; § Suspended list; Roster updated April 22, 2026 Transactions

== South Division ==
=== Charleston Dirty Birds ===
Charleston Dirty Birds roster
Active (25-man) roster	Coaching staff
Pitchers: -- Adrian Almeida; -- Jorge Bautista; -- Mack Lemieux; -- Lance Lusk; -- Joan Martinez; -- Kyle McGowin; -- Cristofer Ogando; -- Gerald Ogando; -- Edison Suriel; Catchers: -- Rusber Estrada; Infielders: -- Keon Barnum; -- Dariel Gomez; -- Anderson Tejeda; Outfielders: -- Willy García; -- Tillman Pugh	Manager: -- P. J. Phillips; Coaches: -- Cip Garza (bench); -- Robert Carson (pitching); Disabled list; ‡ Inactive list; § Suspended list; updated April 18, 2024 Transactions

=== Gastonia Ghost Peppers ===
Gastonia Ghost Peppers roster
Active roster	Coaching staff
Pitchers: 25 Spencer Adams; 31 Blake Brown; 12 Connor Grey; 22 Halton Hardy; 17 Ryan Hennen; 26 Nick Horvath; 27 Eddie Leon; 35 Ethan Lindow ‡; 24 Evan Long; 2 Jake Miednik; 19 Mark Moclair; 30 McKinley Moore; 33 Ljay Newsome; 20 Nate Peden; 38 Jake Rice; Catchers: 23 Chris Proctor; 18 Jace Rinehart; 5 Chandler Seagle; Infielders: 4 Jonny Barditch; -- Bryson Brigman; 28 Xavier Casserilla; 34 Grant Lavigne; 1 Jack Reinheimer; 13 Anthony Prato; Outfielders: 3 Trenton Craig; 9 Hudson Haskin; 11 Nate Scantlin	Manager: 47 Mauro Gozzo; Coaches: 50 Tony Fossas (pitching); 8 Will Johnson (hitting); Disabled list; ‡ Inactive list; § Suspended list; Roster updated May 6, 2026 Transactions

=== High Point Rockers ===
High Point Rockers roster
Active roster	Coaching staff
Pitchers: 10 Ben Wereski; 13 Win Scott; 15 Scott Rouse; 18 Cody Whitten; 20 Daniel Blair; 21 Fin Del Bonta-Smith; 22 Yuhi Sako; 23 Matt Solter; 27 Kent Emanuel; 29 Jose Atencio‡; 33 Alec Barger; 35 David Hess‡; 36 Zach Vennaro; 40 Duncan Howard; 45 Xander Hamilton; Catchers: 4 Nolan Watson; 8 Chris Napleton; Infielders: 1 Aiden Brewer; 2 D.J. Burt; 3 Anthony Servideo; 9 Murphy Stehly; 14 Max Viera; 17 Ethan Skender; 30 Patrick Sanchez; 30 Braxton Davidson; 48 Nick Longhi; 7 Ian Yetsko‡; Outfielders: 5 Troy Schreffer; 6 Bryson Parks; 27 Gilberto Jimenez	Manager: 26 Jamie Keefe; Coaches: 16 Frank Viola (Pitching); Disabled list; ‡ Inactive list; § Suspended list; Roster updated April 23, 2026 Transactions

=== Lexington Legends ===
Lexington Legends roster
Active (25-man) roster	Coaching staff
Pitchers: -- Dustin Beggs; Catchers Infielders: -- Matt Bottcher; Outfielders: -- J. C. Encarnacion	Manager: -- Gregg Zaun; Coaches: -- Arthur Rhodes (Pitching); -- Kevin Castleberry (Assistant); -- Mikey Reynolds (Assistant); Disabled list; ‡ Inactive list; § Suspended list; updated March 7, 2024 Transactions

=== Southern Maryland Blue Crabs ===
Southern Maryland Blue Crabs roster
Active roster	Coaching staff
Pitchers: 25 Devin Kirby-Williams; 32 Dylan Beck; 37 Endrys Briceno; 26 Ethan Bates; 50 Ethan Hammerberg; 40 Garrett Ouellette; 23 Connor Overton; 19 Ian Kahaloa; 3 Issac Fix; 17 Sikes; 6 Justin Sanchez; 41 Rafi Vasquez; 44 Kyle Virbitsky; 48 Pedro Santos; 28 Peyton Cariaco; Utility players: 24 Alejandro De Aza; 10 Jackson Loftin; Catchers: 27 Carlos Rojas; 15 Ryan McCarthy; Infielders: 14 Brody Fahr; 18 Jamari Baylor; 2; 9; Outfielders: 2 Stephen Paolini; 11 Danny Bautista Jr.; 22 Ethan Wilson; 13 Ezequiel Pagan	Manager: -- Brett Jodie; Coaches: 1 Jason Camilli (hitting); Disabled list; ‡ Inactive list; § Suspended list; Roster updated April 24, 2026 Transactions

== Hiatus ==
=== Spire City Ghost Hounds ===
Spire City Ghost Hounds roster
Active (25-man) roster	Coaching staff
Pitchers: 14 Dustin Beggs; 17 Brady Feigl; 34 Arnaldo Hernandez; 14 Jeff Johnson; 15 William Kirwan; 24 David Kubiak; 30 Winston Lavendier; 30 Tai Tiedemann; 37 Elih Villanueva; 27 Jack Weinberger; Catchers: 16 Kole Cottam; 22 Raudy Read; 31 Nicco Toni; Infielders: 4 Osvaldo Abreu; 9 Luke Becker; 13 Starlin Castro; 31 Wilson Garcia; 4 Gavin Jones ‡; 2 Scott Kelly; 26 José Marmolejos; 25 Jimmy Paredes; Outfielders: 5 Leobaldo Cabrera; 11 Craig Dedelow; 3 Jonni Turbo; 23 Corbin Steinour	Manager: -- Mark Minicozzi; Coaches: 31 Elih Villanueva (pitching); -- Derek Wolfe (hitting); Disabled list; ‡ Inactive list; § Suspended list; updated April 18, 2023 Transactions
