= High Point Rockers =

American minor-league professional baseball team

Logo
Cap insignia

Information
- League: Atlantic League of Professional Baseball (South Division)
- Location: High Point, North Carolina
- Ballpark: Truist Point
- Founded: 2018
- Colors: Rocket chair red, ball point blue, summertime yellow, white, black
- Mascot: Hype
- Ownership: High Point Baseball, Inc.
- President: Pete Fisch
- Manager: Jamie Keefe
- Media: High Point Enterprise
- Website: highpointrockers.com

The High Point Rockers are an American professional minor-league baseball team based at Truist Point ballpark in High Point, North Carolina, which is part of the Piedmont Triad region. They are members of the South Division of the Atlantic League of Professional Baseball, a Partner League of Major League Baseball.

== History ==
Shortly before the conclusion of the 2017 season, the city of Bridgeport, Connecticut, voted to not continue with professional baseball in the city and announced plans to convert The Ballpark at Harbor Yard into a music amphitheater. On August 7, 2017, the Bridgeport Bluefish announced that the 2017 season would be the team's last in Bridgeport after playing in the city for 20 years. On September 8, 2017, Frank Boulton (league founder and a team owner) announced that the Bluefish would move to High Point, North Carolina. The league instead unanimously approved a new franchise in High Point on March 12, 2018, to replace the Bluefish to begin play in 2019.

Ground was officially broken on April 11, 2018, for the new ballpark in High Point, to be called BB&T Point (now Truist Point).

On June 7, 2018, a "Name the Team" contest was launched with nine finalists: Chairmen, Dragon Claws, Hush Puppies, Iron Dragons, Iron Eagles, Pioneers, Rockers, and Splinters. On June 21, 2018, the names were narrowed down to Dragon Claws, Rockers, and Splinters. On July 12, 2018, Rockers was chosen as the team name.

On November 28, 2018, the High Point Rockers announced Jamie Keefe as the team's first manager and Frank Viola as the Rockers' first pitching coach. On October 7, 2025, both Keefe and Viola received three-year contract extensions.

On April 1, 2019, the team revealed their mascot, a rocking horse, and invited the public to submit name suggestions. Hype was later chosen as the mascot name.

The Rockers won their inaugural home game, defeating the Sugar Land Skeeters on May 2, 2019.

== Current roster ==
High Point Rockers roster
Active roster	Coaching staff
Pitchers: 10 Ben Wereski; 13 Win Scott; 15 Scott Rouse; 18 Cody Whitten; 20 Daniel Blair; 21 Fin Del Bonta-Smith; 22 Yuhi Sako; 23 Matt Solter; 27 Kent Emanuel; 29 Jose Atencio‡; 33 Alec Barger; 35 David Hess‡; 36 Zach Vennaro; 40 Duncan Howard; 45 Xander Hamilton; Catchers: 4 Nolan Watson; 8 Chris Napleton; Infielders: 1 Aiden Brewer; 2 D.J. Burt; 3 Anthony Servideo; 9 Murphy Stehly; 14 Max Viera; 17 Ethan Skender; 30 Patrick Sanchez; 30 Braxton Davidson; 48 Nick Longhi; 7 Ian Yetsko‡; Outfielders: 5 Troy Schreffer; 6 Bryson Parks; 27 Gilberto Jimenez	Manager: 26 Jamie Keefe; Coaches: 16 Frank Viola (Pitching); Disabled list; ‡ Inactive list; § Suspended list; Roster updated April 23, 2026 Transactions

== Season-by-season results ==
Year	Wins	Losses	Playoffs
2019	74	66	Lost Opening Round to Long Island
2020	Season canceled due to the COVID-19 pandemic		
2021	64	55	did not qualify
2022	71	61	Defeated Gastonia in Southern Division - Lost Against Lancaster in Finals
2023	78	46	Lost Division Finals to Gastonia
2024	74	52	did not qualify
2025	74	52	Defeated Gastonia Ghost Peppers in first round. Lost to York Revolution 3-1 in League Championship Series.
435	332	4 Appearances, 2 Southern Championships (2022, 2025)	
