= Braxton Davidson =

American baseball player (born 1996)

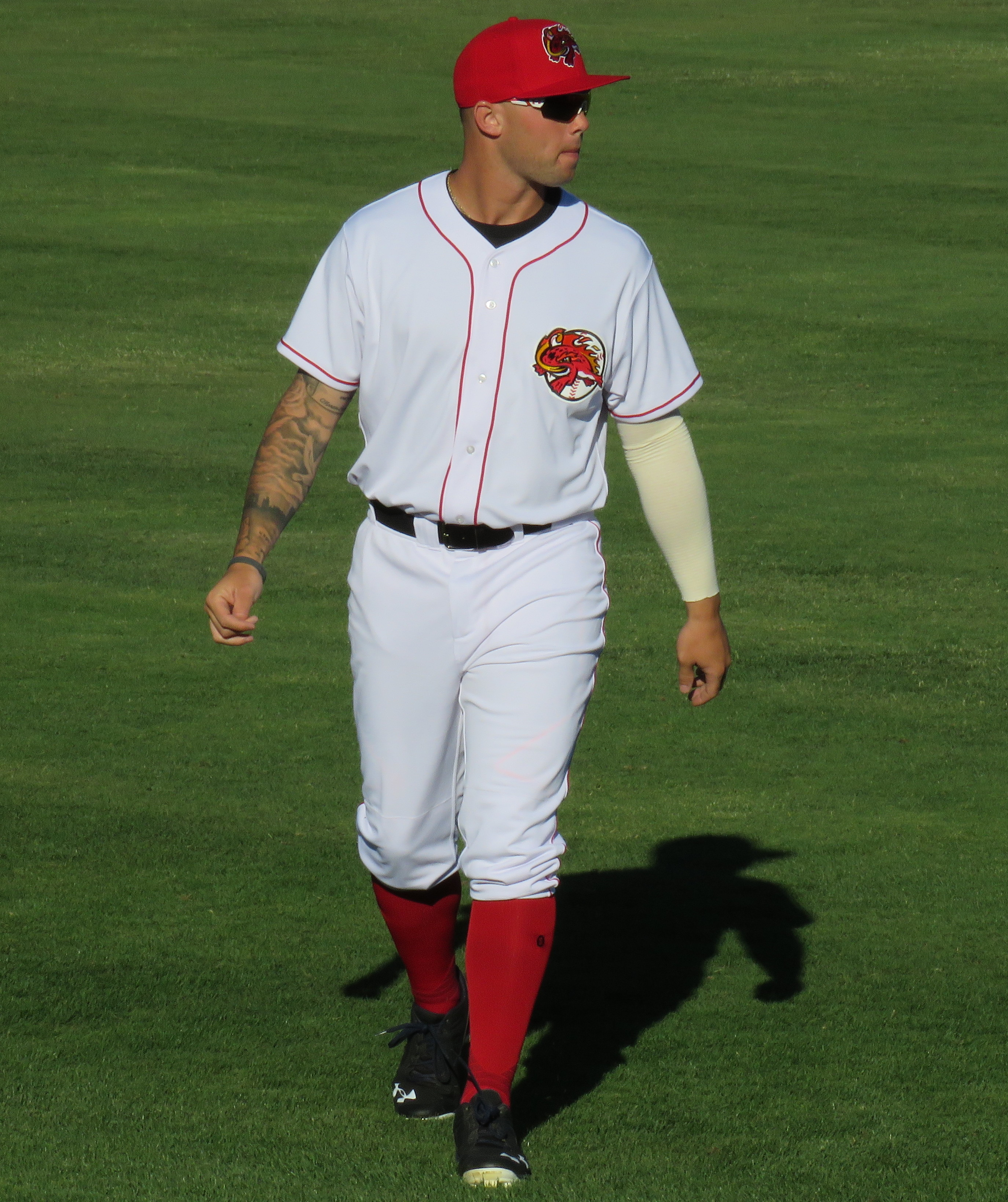
- Davidson with the Florida Fire Frogs

High Point Rockers – No. 30
- Outfielder
- Born: June 18, 1996 (age 29); Asheville, North Carolina, U.S.
- Bats: Left Throws: Left
- Stats at Baseball Reference

Braxton Cain Thomas Davidson (born June 18, 1996) is an American professional baseball outfielder for the High Point Rockers of the Atlantic League of Professional Baseball. He was drafted by the Atlanta Braves in the first round of the 2014 Major League Baseball draft.

== Career ==
=== Atlanta Braves ===
Davidson attended T. C. Roberson High School in Asheville, North Carolina. He was drafted by the Atlanta Braves in the first round of the 2014 Major League Baseball draft. He signed with Atlanta, forgoing his commitment to play college baseball at the University of North Carolina.

Davidson spent his first professional season with both the rookie-level Gulf Coast League Braves and the Danville Braves, batting a combined .224 with 11 RBI in fifty games between the two affiliates. He spent the 2015 season with the Rome Braves where he hit .242 with ten home runs and 45 RBI, in 124 games. After spending time in major league spring training, Davidson was assigned to the Carolina Mudcats to start 2016. He spent the whole 2016 season with the Mudcats where he posted a .224 batting average with ten home runs and 63 RBI in 128 games. Davidson spent 2017 with the Florida Fire Frogs where he batted .213 with seven home runs and 36 RBI in 111 games, and he returned to the Fire Frogs in 2018, slashing .171/.281/.365 with twenty home runs and 64 RBI in 121 games. After the 2018 season, he was assigned to the Peoria Javelinas of the Arizona Fall League.

Davidson missed all of 2019 due to injury. He did not play in a minor league game in 2020 due to the cancellation of the minor league season because of the COVID-19 pandemic. Davidson was released from the Braves organization on May 28, 2020.

=== Team Texas ===
In July 2020, Davidson signed on to play for Team Texas of the Constellation Energy League (a makeshift 4-team independent league created as a result of the COVID-19 pandemic) for the 2020 season.

=== Joliet Slammers ===
On March 18, 2021, Davidson signed with the Joliet Slammers of the Frontier League. In 56 appearances for Joliet, Davidson batted .240/.385/.480 with 12 home runs, 28 RBI, and four stolen bases.

=== Schaumburg Boomers ===
On August 10, 2021, Davidson was traded to the Schaumburg Boomers of the Frontier League. He made 30 games for Schaumburg down the stretch, slashing .363/.484/.775 with 10 home runs and 30 RBI. On January 5, 2022, Davidson was released by the Boomers.

On April 13, 2022, Davidson re-signed with the Boomers. He played in 78 games for Schaumburg, batting .244/.420/.504 with 18 home runs, 59 RBI, and 10 stolen bases. Davidson did not re-sign with the Boomers for the 2023 season.

=== Chicago Dogs ===
On May 9, 2023, Davidson signed with the Chicago Dogs of the American Association of Professional Baseball. He played in four games for Chicago, going 3-for-16 (.188) with one home run and three RBI. On May 18, Davidson was released by the Dogs.

=== Gastonia Honey Hunters ===
On May 19, 2023, Davidson signed with the Gastonia Honey Hunters of the Atlantic League of Professional Baseball. In 89 games, Davidson batted .267/.418/.609 with 25 home runs and 78 RBI.

=== Saraperos de Saltillo ===
On November 21, 2023, Davidson signed with the Saraperos de Saltillo of the Mexican League. In two games for Saltillo, he went 1–for–3 (.333) with no home runs and one RBI. On April 24, 2024, Davidson was released by the Saraperos.

=== Gastonia Ghost Peppers ===
On April 30, 2024, Davidson signed with the Gastonia Ghost Peppers of the Atlantic League of Professional Baseball. In 26 appearances for Gastonia, he batted .141/.263/.224 with two home runs, nine RBI, and one stolen base. Davidson became a free agent following the season.

On April 4, 2025, Davidson re-signed with the Ghost Peppers. However, he was released prior to the start of the season on April 22.

=== High Point Rockers ===
On June, 6, 2025, Davidson signed with the High Point Rockers of the Atlantic League of Professional Baseball. In 71 games he hit .220/.388/.405 with 11 home runs and 31 RBIs.

== Personal ==
Davidson's parents are Cecil Davidson and Tanya Caldwell.
