= Jack Reinheimer =

American baseball player (born 1992)

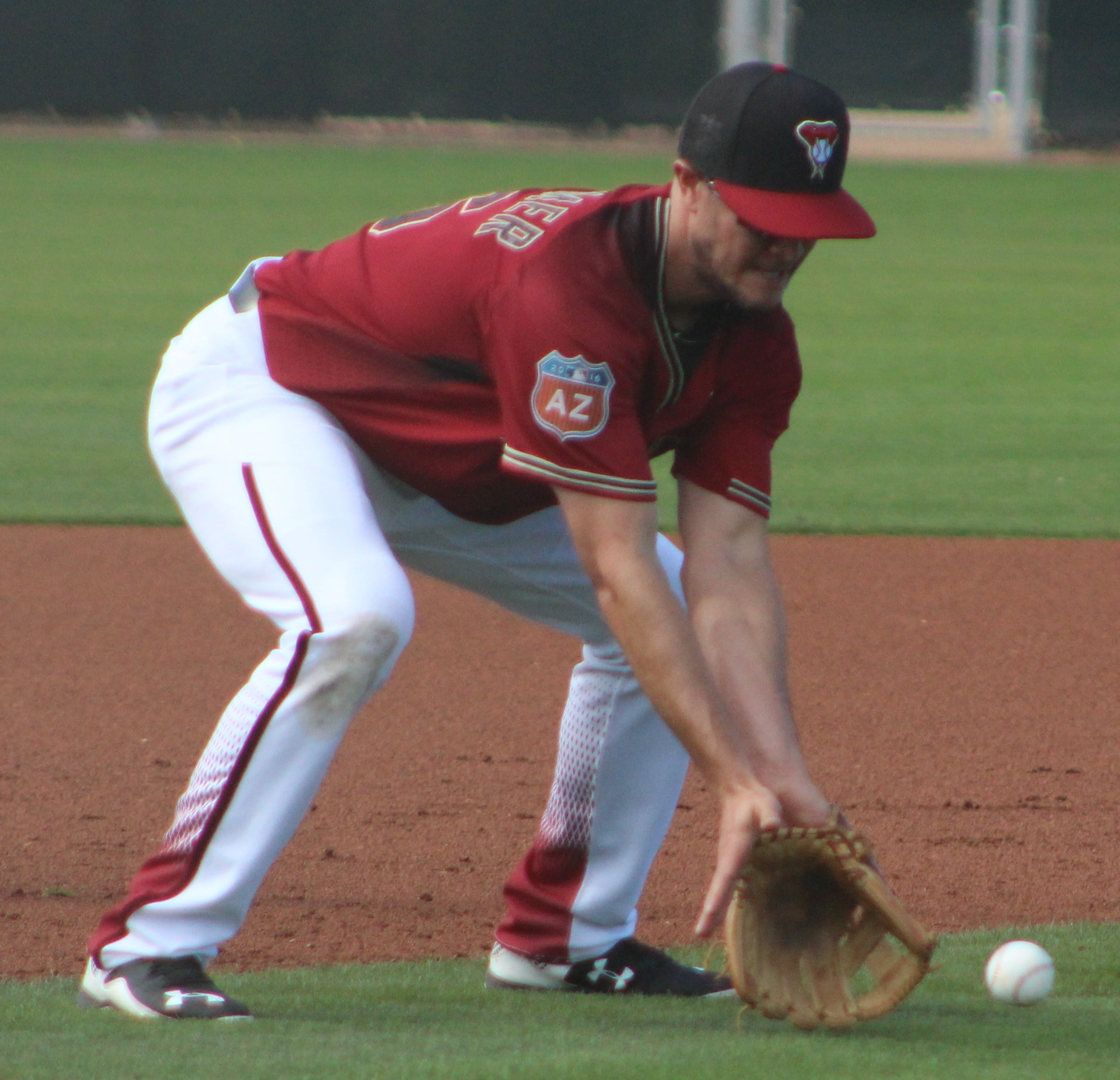
- Reinheimer with the Arizona Diamondbacks in 2016

Gastonia Ghost Peppers – No. 1
- Shortstop
- Born: July 19, 1992 (age 34); Charlotte, North Carolina
- Bats: Right Throws: Right

MLB debut
- August 1, 2017, for the Arizona Diamondbacks

MLB statistics (through 2018 season)
- Batting average: .143
- Home runs: 0
- Runs batted in: 0
- Stats at Baseball Reference

Teams
- Arizona Diamondbacks (2017); New York Mets (2018)

John Patrick Reinheimer (born July 19, 1992) is an American professional baseball shortstop for the Gastonia Ghost Peppers of the Atlantic League of Professional Baseball. He has previously played in Major League Baseball (MLB) for the Arizona Diamondbacks and New York Mets. He played college baseball at East Carolina University.

== Career ==
=== Amateur ===
Reinheimer was drafted by the Atlanta Braves in the 31st round of the 2010 Major League Baseball draft out of Ardrey Kell High School in Charlotte, North Carolina. He did not sign with the Braves and attended East Carolina University to play college baseball. In 2012, he played collegiate summer baseball with the Bourne Braves of the Cape Cod Baseball League.

=== Seattle Mariners ===
Reinheimer was drafted by the Seattle Mariners in the fifth round, with the 147th overall selection, of the 2013 Major League Baseball draft. He signed and spent 2013 with the Everett AquaSox where he batted .269 with two home runs and 30 RBI in 66 games. In 2014, he played for the Clinton LumberKings and High Desert Mavericks, posting a combined .276 batting average with three home runs, 58 RBI, and 39 stolen bases in 130 total games between both teams. He started 2015 with the Jackson Generals.

=== Arizona Diamondbacks ===
On June 3, 2015, the Mariners traded Reinheimer along with Dominic Leone, Welington Castillo and Gabby Guerrero to the Arizona Diamondbacks for Mark Trumbo and Vidal Nuño. Arizona assigned him to the Mobile BayBears and he finished the season there. In 124 total games between Jackson and Mobile, he slashed .270/.342/.363 with five home runs and 42 RBIs. Reinheimer spent 2016 with the Reno Aces where he compiled a .288 batting average with two home runs and 48 RBIs in 132 games. The Diamondbacks added him to their 40-man roster after the 2016 season. He began 2017 with Reno. Reinheimer made his MLB debut on August 2, 2017.

=== New York Mets ===
He was claimed off waivers by the New York Mets on July 31, 2018.

Reinheimer recorded his first Major League hit on August 15 against Cody Carroll of the Baltimore Orioles at Camden Yards.

=== Baltimore Orioles ===
On November 2, 2018, Reinheimer was claimed off waivers by the Chicago Cubs. On November 20, he was claimed by the Texas Rangers. On January 28, 2019, Reinheimer was claimed yet again, this time by the Baltimore Orioles. On February 7, Reinheimer was designated for assignment following the signing of Nate Karns. He cleared waivers and was sent outright to the Triple-A Norfolk Tides on February 14. In 106 games for Norfolk, Reinheimer batted .246/.323/.336 with 4 home runs, 31 RBI, and 12 stolen bases. He became a free agent following the season on November 4.

=== Minnesota Twins ===
On December 20, 2019, Reinheimer signed a minor league deal with the Minnesota Twins. He did not play in a game in 2020 due to the cancellation of the minor league season because of the COVID-19 pandemic. Reinheimer was released by the Twins organization on September 4, 2020.

=== Seattle Mariners (second stint) ===
On February 1, 2021, Reinheimer signed a minor league contract with an invitation to Spring Training with his original team, the Seattle Mariners. He made 91 appearances for the Triple-A Tacoma Rainiers, batting .242/.311/.330 with four home runs, 34 RBI, and 18 stolen bases. Reinheimer elected free agency following the season on November 7.

=== Gastonia Honey Hunters ===
On February 25, 2022, Reinheimer signed with the Gastonia Honey Hunters of the Atlantic League of Professional Baseball. Reinheimer played in 121 games for Gastonia, hitting .281/.362/.444 with 12 home runs, 69 RBI, and 55 stolen bases. Following the regular season, he was named an Atlantic League All-Star. He became a free agent following the season.

On April 19, 2023, Reinheimer re-signed with the Honey Hunters for the 2023 season. In 41 games for Gastonia, Reinheimer slashed .313/.421/.513 with five home runs, 19 RBI, and 23 stolen bases.

=== Kansas City Royals ===
On June 16, 2023, Reinheimer had his contract purchased by the Kansas City Royals and was assigned to the Double–A Northwest Arkansas Naturals. In 26 games for the Naturals, he hit .132/.185/.171 with 3 RBI and 4 stolen bases. On August 7, Reinheimer was released by the Royals organization.

=== Gastonia Honey Hunters / Gastonia Baseball Club ===
On August 29, 2023, Reinheimer signed with the Gastonia Honey Hunters of the Atlantic League of Professional Baseball.

On April 18, 2024, after the Honey Hunters folded, Reinheimer signed with the Gastonia Baseball Club of the Atlantic League of Professional Baseball. In 53 games for Gastonia, he batted .269/.356/.394 with six home runs, 21 RBI, and 19 stolen bases.

=== Chicago Cubs ===
On June 25, 2024, Reinheimer's contract was purchased by the Chicago Cubs organization. In 35 appearances for the Double-A Tennessee Smokies and Triple-A Iowa Cubs, he batted a combined .172/.220/.238 with one home run, 11 RBI, and three stolen bases. Reinheimer was released by the Cubs organization on August 12.

=== Gastonia Ghost Peppers ===
On April 14, 2025, Reinheimer signed with the Gastonia Ghost Peppers of the Atlantic League of Professional Baseball. On May 23, manager Mauro Gozzo named Reinheimer the team's first captain in franchise history. He played in his 300th game for the club on July 16, becoming the first player to reach the milestone. In 113 appearances for Gastonia, Reinheimer slashed .246/.353/.389 with 12 home runs, 64 RBI, and 27 stolen bases.

On April 1, 2026, Reinheimer re-signed with Gastonia.
