= 2011 World Youth Baseball Championship =

Tournament details
- Country: Mexico
- Dates: 19 August - 28 August
- Teams: 11
- Defending champions: United States

Final positions
- Champions: United States (5th title)
- Runners-up: Cuba
- Third place: Japan
- Fourth place: Mexico

Tournament statistics
- Games played: 34
- Attendance: 55,069 (1,620 per game)
- Best BA: (United States) Bryson Brigman
- Most HRs: (United States) Zack Collins
- Most SBs: (Venezuela) Franklin Barreto
- Best ERA: (Japan) Shota Tatsuta

Awards
- MVP: (United States) Zack Collins

The 2011 World Youth Baseball Championship was an under-16 international baseball competition held in Lagos de Moreno, Mexico from August 19 to August 28, 2011. This event is considered a test event for the 2011 Pan American Games baseball event.

== Teams ==
Eleven teams participated in the tournament. Originally, the Philippines would appear in Group A, but the team withdrew one week before the tournament.

Group A	Group B
Australia	Cuba
Brazil	Dominican Republic
Chinese Taipei^{1}	Indonesia
Mexico	Japan
United States	Netherlands
	Venezuela

^1 Chinese Taipei is the official IBAF designation for the team representing the state officially referred to as the Republic of China, more commonly known as Taiwan. (See also political status of Taiwan for details.)

== Round 1 ==
=== Group A ===
==== Standings ====
Teams	W	L	Pct.	GB	R	RA
United States	4	0	1.000	—	70	21
Mexico	2	2	.500	2	22	30
Chinese Taipei	2	2	.500	2	32	35
Australia	1	3	.250	3	35	54
Brazil	1	3	.250	3	29	48

==== Schedule and results ====
August 19, 2011	Mexico	8 – 6	Chinese Taipei	Pan American Baseball Stadium, Lagos de Moreno; Attendance: 2500
August 19, 2011		Boxscore		Pan American Baseball Stadium, Lagos de Moreno; Attendance: 2500

August 19, 2011	Australia	11 – 21 (F/8)	United States	Pan American Baseball Stadium, Lagos de Moreno; Attendance: 2000
August 19, 2011		Boxscore		Pan American Baseball Stadium, Lagos de Moreno; Attendance: 2000

August 20, 2011	Chinese Taipei	7 – 6	Brazil	Pan American Baseball Stadium, Lagos de Moreno; Attendance: 600
August 20, 2011		Boxscore		Pan American Baseball Stadium, Lagos de Moreno; Attendance: 600

August 20, 2011	Mexico	5 – 3	Australia	Pan American Baseball Stadium, Lagos de Moreno; Attendance: 1200
August 20, 2011		Boxscore		Pan American Baseball Stadium, Lagos de Moreno; Attendance: 1200

August 21, 2011	Chinese Taipei	6 – 19 (F/7)	United States	Pan American Baseball Stadium, Lagos de Moreno; Attendance: 617
August 21, 2011		Boxscore		Pan American Baseball Stadium, Lagos de Moreno; Attendance: 617

August 21, 2011	Brazil	7 – 6 (F/10)	Mexico	Pan American Baseball Stadium, Lagos de Moreno; Attendance: 1372
August 21, 2011		Boxscore		Pan American Baseball Stadium, Lagos de Moreno; Attendance: 1372

August 22, 2011	Brazil	15 – 19	Australia	Pan American Baseball Stadium, Lagos de Moreno; Attendance: 150
August 22, 2011		Boxscore		Pan American Baseball Stadium, Lagos de Moreno; Attendance: 150

August 22, 2011	United States	14 – 3 (F/7)	Mexico	Pan American Baseball Stadium, Lagos de Moreno; Attendance: 3700
August 22, 2011		Boxscore		Pan American Baseball Stadium, Lagos de Moreno; Attendance: 3700

August 23, 2011	Australia	2 – 13 (F/7)	Chinese Taipei	Pan American Baseball Stadium, Lagos de Moreno; Attendance: 200
August 23, 2011		Boxscore		Pan American Baseball Stadium, Lagos de Moreno; Attendance: 200

August 23, 2011	United States	16 – 1 (F/5)	Brazil	Pan American Baseball Stadium, Lagos de Moreno; Attendance: 400
August 23, 2011		Boxscore		Pan American Baseball Stadium, Lagos de Moreno; Attendance: 400

=== Group B ===
==== Standings ====
Teams	W	L	Pct.	GB	R	RA
Cuba^{2}	4	1	.800	—	51	18
Venezuela	4	1	.800	—	63	41
Japan	3	2	.600	1	36	16
Netherlands	3	2	.600	1	50	24
Indonesia	1	4	.200	3	12	68
Dominican Republic^{3}	0	5	.000	4	0	45

==== Schedule and results ====
August 19, 2011	Dominican Republic	0 – 9 (Forfeit)	Indonesia	Alberto Romo Chávez Baseball Stadium, Aguascalientes
August 19, 2011		Boxscore		Alberto Romo Chávez Baseball Stadium, Aguascalientes

August 19, 2011	Cuba	0 – 9 (Forfeit)	Netherlands	Alberto Romo Chávez Baseball Stadium, Aguascalientes
August 19, 2011		Boxscore		Alberto Romo Chávez Baseball Stadium, Aguascalientes

August 19, 2011	Venezuela	10 – 9 (F/10)	Japan	Alberto Romo Chávez Baseball Stadium, Aguascalientes; Attendance: 2500
August 19, 2011		Boxscore		Alberto Romo Chávez Baseball Stadium, Aguascalientes; Attendance: 2500

August 20, 2011	Netherlands	21 – 2 (F/5)	Indonesia	Alberto Romo Chávez Baseball Stadium, Aguascalientes; Attendance: 1400
August 20, 2011		Boxscore		Alberto Romo Chávez Baseball Stadium, Aguascalientes; Attendance: 1400

August 20, 2011	Cuba	6 – 5	Japan	Alberto Romo Chávez Baseball Stadium, Aguascalientes; Attendance: 3000
August 20, 2011		Boxscore		Alberto Romo Chávez Baseball Stadium, Aguascalientes; Attendance: 3000

August 20, 2011	Dominican Republic	0 – 9 (Forfeit)	Venezuela	Alberto Romo Chávez Baseball Stadium, Aguascalientes
August 20, 2011		Boxscore		Alberto Romo Chávez Baseball Stadium, Aguascalientes

August 21, 2011	Netherlands	0 – 3	Japan	Alberto Romo Chávez Baseball Stadium, Aguascalientes; Attendance: 3200
August 21, 2011		Boxscore		Alberto Romo Chávez Baseball Stadium, Aguascalientes; Attendance: 3200

August 21, 2011	Cuba	9 – 0 (Forfeit)	Dominican Republic	Alberto Romo Chávez Baseball Stadium, Aguascalientes
August 21, 2011		Boxscore		Alberto Romo Chávez Baseball Stadium, Aguascalientes

August 21, 2011	Indonesia	1 – 21 (F/5)	Venezuela	Alberto Romo Chávez Baseball Stadium, Aguascalientes; Attendance: 500
August 21, 2011		Boxscore		Alberto Romo Chávez Baseball Stadium, Aguascalientes; Attendance: 500

August 22, 2011	Dominican Republic	0 – 9 (Forfeit)	Netherlands	Alberto Romo Chávez Baseball Stadium, Aguascalientes
August 22, 2011		Boxscore		Alberto Romo Chávez Baseball Stadium, Aguascalientes

August 22, 2011	Japan	10 – 0 (F/7)	Indonesia	Alberto Romo Chávez Baseball Stadium, Aguascalientes; Attendance: 120
August 22, 2011		Boxscore		Alberto Romo Chávez Baseball Stadium, Aguascalientes; Attendance: 120

August 22, 2011	Venezuela	4 – 20	Cuba	Alberto Romo Chávez Baseball Stadium, Aguascalientes; Attendance: 4000
August 22, 2011		Boxscore		Alberto Romo Chávez Baseball Stadium, Aguascalientes; Attendance: 4000

August 23, 2011	Indonesia	0 – 16 (F/5)	Cuba	Alberto Romo Chávez Baseball Stadium, Aguascalientes; Attendance: 100
August 23, 2011		Boxscore		Alberto Romo Chávez Baseball Stadium, Aguascalientes; Attendance: 100

August 23, 2011	Netherlands	11 – 19	Venezuela	Alberto Romo Chávez Baseball Stadium, Aguascalientes; Attendance: 2500
August 23, 2011		Boxscore		Alberto Romo Chávez Baseball Stadium, Aguascalientes; Attendance: 2500

August 23, 2011	Japan	9 – 0 (Forfeit)	Dominican Republic	Alberto Romo Chávez Baseball Stadium, Aguascalientes
August 23, 2011		Boxscore		Alberto Romo Chávez Baseball Stadium, Aguascalientes

^2 The team from Cuba did not arrive in time in Mexico for the tournament and lost their first game due to forfeit, which was scheduled against the Netherlands.

^3 The team from the Dominican Republic did not arrive in Mexico and lost all their games due to forfeit.

== Round 2 ==
=== Group C ===
==== Standings ====
Teams	W	L	Pct.	GB	R	RA
Cuba	5	1	.833	—	53	31
United States	5	1	.833	—	91	49
Japan	4	2	.667	1	41	31
Mexico	3	3	.500	2	34	45
Chinese Taipei	3	3	.500	2	45	40
Venezuela	3	3	.500	2	61	75
Netherlands	1	5	.167	4	31	53
Australia	0	6	.000	5	35	67

==== Schedule and results ====
August 25, 2011	United States	14 – 3 (F/5)	Netherlands	Pan American Baseball Stadium, Lagos de Moreno; Attendance: 350
August 25, 2011		Boxscore		Pan American Baseball Stadium, Lagos de Moreno; Attendance: 350

August 25, 2011	Venezuela	2 – 9	Chinese Taipei	Alberto Romo Chávez Baseball Stadium, Aguascalientes; Attendance: 150
August 25, 2011		Boxscore		Alberto Romo Chávez Baseball Stadium, Aguascalientes; Attendance: 150

August 25, 2011	Mexico	0 – 6	Japan	Pan American Baseball Stadium, Lagos de Moreno; Attendance: 800
August 25, 2011		Boxscore		Pan American Baseball Stadium, Lagos de Moreno; Attendance: 800

August 25, 2011	Cuba	9 – 2	Australia	Alberto Romo Chávez Baseball Stadium, Aguascalientes; Attendance: 1200
August 25, 2011		Boxscore		Alberto Romo Chávez Baseball Stadium, Aguascalientes; Attendance: 1200

August 26, 2011	Japan	10 – 9	Australia	Alberto Romo Chávez Baseball Stadium, Aguascalientes; Attendance: 1000
August 26, 2011		Boxscore		Alberto Romo Chávez Baseball Stadium, Aguascalientes; Attendance: 1000

August 26, 2011	Chinese Taipei	7 – 2	Netherlands	Pan American Baseball Stadium, Lagos de Moreno; Attendance: 130
August 26, 2011		Boxscore		Pan American Baseball Stadium, Lagos de Moreno; Attendance: 130

August 26, 2011	United States	18 – 17	Venezuela	Alberto Romo Chávez Baseball Stadium, Aguascalientes; Attendance: 3500
August 26, 2011		Boxscore		Alberto Romo Chávez Baseball Stadium, Aguascalientes; Attendance: 3500

August 26, 2011	Cuba	11 – 7	Mexico	Pan American Baseball Stadium, Lagos de Moreno; Attendance: 350
August 26, 2011		Boxscore		Pan American Baseball Stadium, Lagos de Moreno; Attendance: 350

August 27, 2011	Cuba	7 – 4	Chinese Taipei	Alberto Romo Chávez Baseball Stadium, Aguascalientes; Attendance: 6000
August 27, 2011		Boxscore		Alberto Romo Chávez Baseball Stadium, Aguascalientes; Attendance: 6000

August 27, 2011	Venezuela	9 – 8	Australia	Pan American Baseball Stadium, Lagos de Moreno; Attendance: 200
August 27, 2011		Boxscore		Pan American Baseball Stadium, Lagos de Moreno; Attendance: 200

August 27, 2011	United States	6 – 8 (F/10)	Japan	Pan American Baseball Stadium, Lagos de Moreno; Attendance: 800
August 27, 2011		Boxscore		Pan American Baseball Stadium, Lagos de Moreno; Attendance: 800

August 28, 2011	Mexico	11 – 5	Netherlands	Alberto Romo Chávez Baseball Stadium, Aguascalientes; Attendance: 5000
August 28, 2011		Boxscore		Alberto Romo Chávez Baseball Stadium, Aguascalientes; Attendance: 5000

=== Group D ===
==== Standings ====
Teams	W	L	Pct.	GB	R	RA
Brazil	2	0	1.000	—	33	2
Indonesia	0	2	.000	2	2	33

==== Schedule and results ====
August 25, 2011	Brazil	17 – 2 (F/6)	Indonesia	Pan American Baseball Stadium, Lagos de Moreno; Attendance: 30
August 25, 2011		Boxscore		Pan American Baseball Stadium, Lagos de Moreno; Attendance: 30

August 26, 2011	Indonesia	0 – 16 (F/7)	Brazil	Alberto Romo Chávez Baseball Stadium, Aguascalientes; Attendance: 200
August 26, 2011		Boxscore		Alberto Romo Chávez Baseball Stadium, Aguascalientes; Attendance: 200

August 27, 2011	Brazil	—	Indonesia	Pan American Baseball Stadium, Lagos de Moreno

== Round 3 ==
=== Bronze medal game ===
August 28, 2011	Japan	8 – 7	Mexico	Alberto Romo Chávez Baseball Stadium, Aguascalientes; Attendance: 3000
August 28, 2011		Boxscore		Alberto Romo Chávez Baseball Stadium, Aguascalientes; Attendance: 3000

=== Gold medal game ===
August 28, 2011	United States	9 – 0	Cuba	Pan American Baseball Stadium, Lagos de Moreno; Attendance: 2300
August 28, 2011		Boxscore		Pan American Baseball Stadium, Lagos de Moreno; Attendance: 2300

== Final standings ==
Rk	Team	W	L
1st place, gold medalist(s)	United States	7	1
Lost in Final
2nd place, silver medalist(s)	Cuba	7	2
Failed to qualify for Gold medal game
3rd place, bronze medalist(s)	Japan	7	2
4	Mexico	3	5
Failed to qualify for Bronze medal game
5	Chinese Taipei	4	3
6	Venezuela	5	3
7	Netherlands	3	5
8	Australia	1	6
Failed to qualify for Group C
9	Brazil	3	3
10	Indonesia	1	6
11	Dominican Republic	0	5

2011 World Youth Baseball champions

United States
5th title

== Awards ==
Awards	Player
Most Valuable Player	(United States) Zack Collins
Outstanding Defensive Player	(Australia) Zac Shepherd

All-Tournament Team
Position	Player
Starting Pitcher	(Brazil) Luiz Gohara
Relief Pitcher	(United States) Chris Pelaez
Catcher	(United States) Zack Collins
First Base	(Mexico) Julian Leon
Second Base	(United States) Bryson Brigman
Third Base	(Cuba) Yoan Moncada
Shortstop	(Australia) Zac Shepherd
Outfield	(United States) Austin Meadows
Outfield	(Chinese Taipei) Yu Chang
Outfield	(Brazil) Leonardo Munhoz
