= Todd Peterson (baseball) =

American baseball player (born 1998)

Caliente de Durango
- Pitcher
- Born: January 22, 1998 (age 28); St. Petersburg, Florida, U.S.
- Bats: Right Throws: Right

Todd Richard Peterson (born January 22, 1998) is an American professional baseball pitcher for the Caliente de Durango of the Mexican League.

== Amateur career ==
A pure pitcher in high school and a reliever for the Louisiana State University Tigers in college, Peterson attracted some media attention when he batted for himself and drove in a pair of runs in an extra-innings win over South Carolina in the Southeastern Conference tournament in 2018. Peterson later told reporters that he had convinced LSU manager Paul Mainieri to let him swing away by telling him he hit "bombs" in high school, which was a lie—Peterson's high school coach at Lake Mary High School had never let him bat in a game, he confessed.

== Professional career ==
=== Washington Nationals ===
In the 2019 Major League Baseball draft, the Washington Nationals used their seventh-round pick (213th overall) to select Peterson out of LSU. Peterson opted to sign with the Nationals and was assigned to the Low-A Auburn Doubledays. In 10 appearances split between Auburn and the rookie-level Gulf Coast League Nationals, he compiled a 2–4 record and 3.49 ERA with 26 strikeouts across 38 2/3 innings pitched.

Peterson did not play in a game in 2020 due to the cancellation of the minor league season because of the COVID-19 pandemic. He pitched in the Nationals' instructional league in Florida after the season. In 2021, Peterson was invited to major league spring training with the Nationals, who chose to keep him with the major league team until nearly the end of spring camp. After being reassigned to the minors, Peterson was placed on the High-A Wilmington Blue Rocks' roster to begin the minor league season. In 20 appearances split between Wilmington and the rookie-level Florida Complex League Nationals, he accumulated a 2–1 record and 3.82 ERA with 36 strikeouts and three saves across 35 1/3 innings pitched.

Peterson pitched for the Surprise Saguaros of the Arizona Fall League after the 2021 season, one of eight players representing the Nationals. He closed out the final game of the regular season for the Saguaros, who went on to lose the championship game to the Mesa Solar Sox, and was the sole National to appear in the Fall Stars Game. During the 2022 campaign, Peterson made 14 appearances for the Single-A Fredericksburg Nationals, in which he posted an 0–2 record and 5.09 ERA with 21 strikeouts and two saves over 17 2/3 innings pitched.

Peterson spent the 2023 season back with High-A Wilmington. In 42 appearances out of the bullpen, he registered a 2–6 record and 4.85 ERA with 44 strikeouts and nine saves across 55 2/3 innings pitched. Peterson began the 2024 season with High-A Wilmington, recording a 1.46 ERA with 12 strikeouts and six saves over 11 appearances. In 42 appearances split between the Blue Rocks and the Double-A Harrisburg Senators, he accumulated a 2–4 record and 3.91 ERA with 42 strikeouts and six across 50 2/3 innings pitched.

Peterson began the 2025 season with Double-A Harrisburg, where he pitched to a 1–1 record and 3.43 ERA with 15 strikeouts across 16 games. He was promoted to the Triple-A Rochester Red Wings on May 23, 2025. In seven appearances for Rochester, Peterson struggled to an 0–1 record and 21.00 ERA with seven strikeouts over six innings of work. Peterson was released by the Nationals organization on June 11.

=== Dorados de Chihuahua ===
On June 17, 2025, Peterson signed with the Dorados de Chihuahua of the Mexican League. He made 20 appearances for Chihuahua, posting a 2–2 record and 5.75 ERA with 15 strikeouts and four saves across 20 1/3 innings pitched.

=== Caliente de Durango ===
On December 19, 2025, Peterson and Max Castillo were traded to the Caliente de Durango in exchange for Bryson Brigman.

== Pitching style ==
As of 2021, Peterson sports a fastball up to about 98 miles per hour (158 km/h) and a developing slider.
