= Zach Vennaro =

American baseball player (born 1996)

Free agent
- Pitcher
- Born: June 3, 1996 (age 30); New Hartford, New York, U.S.
- Bats: Switch Throws: Right

Zachary Vennaro (born June 3, 1996) is an American professional baseball pitcher who is a free agent.

== Career ==
=== Amateur ===
Vennaro attended New York Mills High School, Monroe Community College, and the University of Mount Olive. During his final year at Mount Olive in 2018, he posted an ERA of 0.81 over 44 2/3 innings, but still went unselected in the 2018 Major League Baseball draft. He spent the summer playing in the Coastal Plain League.

=== Ottawa Champions ===
On May 2, 2019, Vennaro signed with the Ottawa Champions of the Can-Am League. In 10 outings for the club, Vennaro recorded an 0.77 ERA with 16 strikeouts across 11 2/3 innings pitched.

=== Milwaukee Brewers ===
On June 19, 2019, Vennaro signed a minor league contract with the Milwaukee Brewers. He spent the remainder of the year with the rookie–level Arizona League Brewers, for whom he had a 3.86 ERA over 28 innings. Vennaro did not play in a game in 2020 due to the cancellation of the minor league season because of the COVID-19 pandemic.

He spent the 2021 season playing with the Double–A Biloxi Shuckers where he made 37 relief appearances and went 1-3 with a 7.61 ERA, 50 strikeouts, and 23 walks over 36 2/3 innings. Vennaro opened the 2022 season with Biloxi and was promoted to the Triple–A Nashville Sounds in late May. Over 49 relief appearances between the two teams, he went 6-2 with a 5.47 ERA, 56 strikeouts, and 11 saves over 54 1/3 innings.

Vennaro spent the entirety of the 2023 season with Double–A Biloxi, registering a 6.05 ERA with 47 strikeouts and 4 saves across 41 relief outings. On September 17, 2023, Vennaro was released by the Brewers organization.

=== Gastonia Baseball Club ===
On April 18, 2024, Vennaro signed with the Gastonia Baseball Club of the Atlantic League of Professional Baseball. In nine games for Gastonia, he struggled to a 7.36 ERA with 12 strikeouts and two saves across 7 1/3 innings pitched. On June 5, Vennaro was released by the club.

=== High Point Rockers ===
On June 8, 2024, Vennaro signed with the High Point Rockers of the Atlantic League of Professional Baseball. In 31 appearances for the Rockers, he recorded a 2.73 ERA with 40 strikeouts across 29 2/3 innings pitched. Vennaro became a free agent following the season.

On April 16, 2025, Vennaro re-signed with High Point. He made 44 appearances for the Rockers, but struggled to an 0-1 record and 7.62 ERA with 53 strikeouts and one save across 41 1/3 innings pitched.

On March 12, 2026, Vennaro re-signed with the Rockers. He made 13 appearances for the team, posting a 1–0 record and 4.40 ERA with 19 strikeouts and one save across 14 1/3 innings pitched.

=== Minnesota Twins ===
On June 6, 2026, the Minnesota Twins purchased Vennaro's contract and assigned him to the Double–A Wichita Wind Surge. He was released on July 23.
