= Hunter Greene =

American baseball player (born 1999)

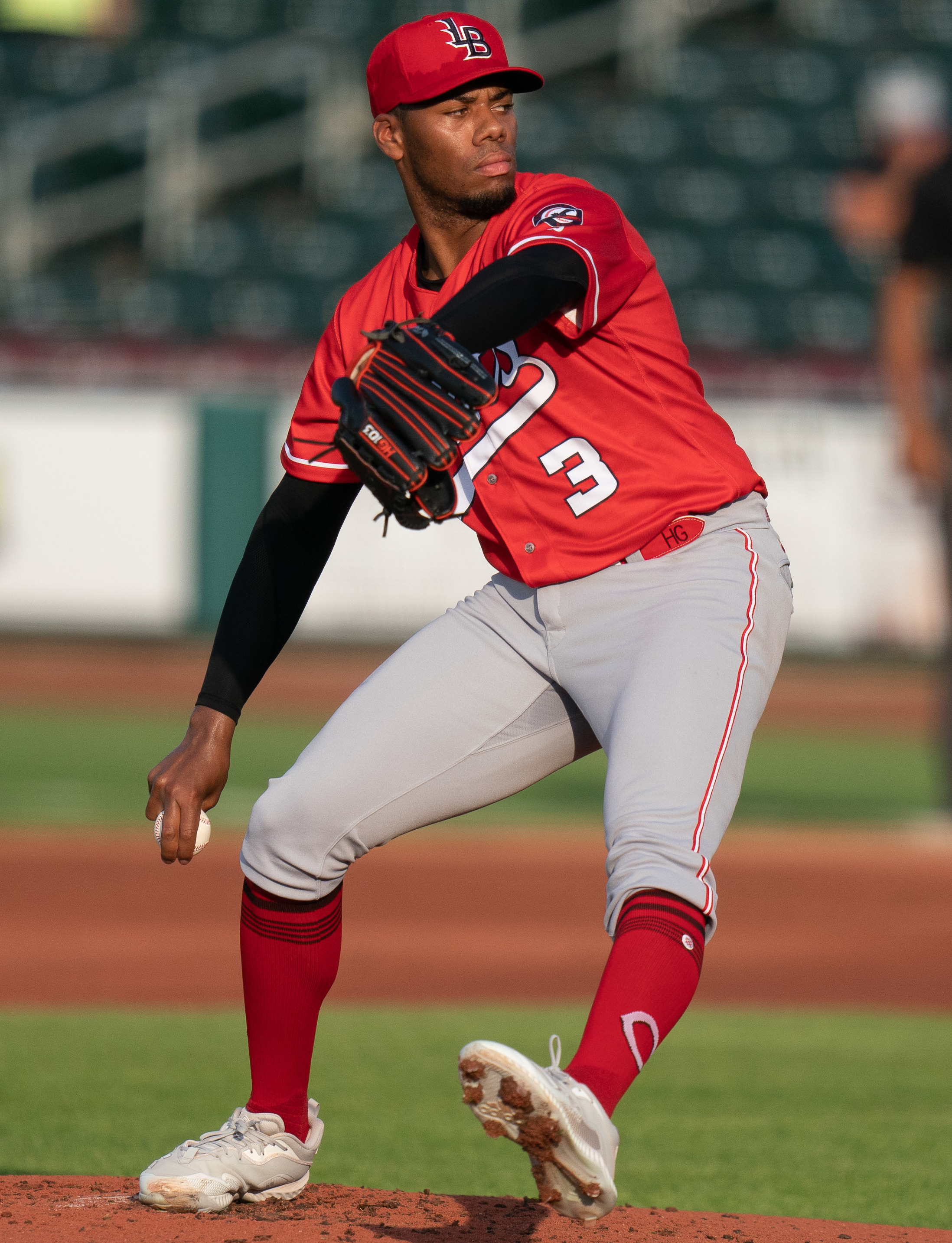
- Greene with the Louisville Bats in 2021

Cincinnati Reds – No. 21
- Pitcher
- Born: August 6, 1999 (age 27); Los Angeles, California, U.S.
- Bats: Right Throws: Right

MLB debut
- April 10, 2022, for the Cincinnati Reds

MLB statistics (through 2026 season)
- Win–loss record: 27–31
- Earned run average: 3.82
- Strikeouts: 650
- Stats at Baseball Reference

Teams
- Cincinnati Reds (2022–2026)

Career highlights and awards
- All-Star (2024)
Medals
Men's baseball
Representing United States
U-15 Baseball World Cup
Silver medal – second place	2014 Mazatlán	Team
U-18 Baseball World Cup
Gold medal – first place	2015 Osaka	Team

Christian Hunter Greene (born August 6, 1999) is an American professional baseball pitcher for the Cincinnati Reds of Major League Baseball (MLB). The Reds selected him second overall in the 2017 MLB draft.

Born in Los Angeles, California, Greene learned how to pitch at the Major League Baseball Urban Youth Academy in Compton. His fastball velocity was already 93 mph (150 km/h) during his first year at Notre Dame High School, and by the time he graduated in 2017, it was up to 102 mph (164 km/h). The Reds drafted Greene out of high school, and he joined their farm system rather than playing college baseball. Greene suffered an ulnar collateral ligament injury partway through the 2018 season and underwent Tommy John surgery the following year. The COVID-19 pandemic kept him from pitching for another year, but once he returned in 2021, he quickly rose through the minor leagues.

Greene made the Reds' Opening Day roster in 2022. In only the second game of his major league career, he set an MLB record by throwing 39 pitches with a velocity of at least 100 mph (160 km/h). He made his first All-Star Game in 2024.

== Early life ==
Greene was born on August 6, 1999, in Los Angeles, California. His mother Senta worked as an educational consultant, while his father Russell worked as a private investigator for Johnnie Cochran. In 2007, when he was seven years old, he joined the Major League Baseball Urban Youth Academy in Compton, California. Greene learned how to pitch at the instructional facility and appeared in several youth showcase events hosted by Major League Baseball (MLB), such as the Junior Home Run Derby at the 2016 MLB All-Star Game at Petco Park.

At Notre Dame High School in Sherman Oaks, Los Angeles, Greene played shortstop when he was not pitching. His fastball velocity was at 93 mph (150 km/h) during his freshman season, and by his senior year, he was pitching up to 102 mph (164 km/h). Over four high school baseball seasons, Greene had a career 1.62 earned run average (ERA) in 121 1/3 innings pitched, striking out over 30 percent of the batters he faced. This included a senior season in which he had a 3–0 win–loss record and 0.75 ERA in five appearances, striking out 43 batters and walking four in 28 innings. Offensively, Greene batted .324 with six home runs, 28 runs batted in (RBI), six doubles, two triples, 23 runs scored, a .374 on-base percentage, and a .598 slugging percentage. In April 2017, Greene became the 13th high school athlete to appear on the cover of Sports Illustrated, and the first high school baseball player since Bryce Harper in 2009.

== Professional career ==
=== Draft and minor leagues (2017–2021) ===
Despite media projections that Greene would be the first overall pick in the 2017 MLB draft, the Minnesota Twins selected Royce Lewis, and Greene was instead taken second overall by the Cincinnati Reds. Greene, who had been committed to play college baseball for the UCLA Bruins since he was a freshman in high school, ultimately agreed to a professional contract with the Reds only a few minutes before the 2 p.m. (PDT) signing deadline on July 7. His $7.23 million signing bonus was the highest of any player since the draft slot system was overhauled in 2012, and the highest of any player since Gerrit Cole signed with the Pittsburgh Pirates in 2011 for $8 million. Once he signed with the Reds, Greene was assigned to the Billings Mustangs, their farm system team in the Rookie-level Pioneer League. Primarily used as a pitcher, Greene also saw time as a designated hitter on days when he did not pitch. He started in three games for the Mustangs, going 0–1 with a 12.46 ERA in the process while striking out six batters in 4 1/3 innings. At the plate, he batted .233 with three RBI in 30 at bats across 10 games.

Greene had difficulty adjusting to the older, more experienced hitters he faced in the Midwest League: in his first five starts, his ERA was 13.97, and opposing hitters batted .420 against him. He improved with coaching, however, with a nine-game stretch in which he pitched to a 2.78 ERA and struck out 54 batters in 45 1/3 innings before pitching in the 2018 All-Star Futures Game. Greene's 2018 season came to an end at the start of August when he sprained the ulnar collateral ligament of his right elbow. He made 18 starts for Dayton before the injury, during which he went 3–7 with a 4.48 ERA and 89 strikeouts. The Reds medical staff had hoped that the injury would improve through nonsurgical rehabilitation, but in March 2019, Greene suffered a setback, and he underwent Tommy John surgery to repair the ligament.

Greene, like other MLB prospects, did not pitch in 2020 either, as the COVID-19 pandemic forced the cancellation of the Minor League Baseball season. When he returned to professional baseball in 2021, he was assigned to the Double-A Chattanooga Lookouts of the Southern League. He made seven starts there, during which he went 5–0 with a 1.98 ERA and struck out 60 batters in 41 innings, before receiving a promotion to the Triple-A Louisville Bats on June 15. Greene started 14 games after the promotion, during which he went 5–8 with a 4.13 ERA and struck out 79 batters in 65 1/3 innings. The Reds put Greene on an innings limit for the season, and he was shut down on September 17 after pitching 106 1/3 innings. Between Chattanooga and Louisville, Greene had a 3.30 ERA and 139 strikeouts for the season. That November, the Reds added Greene to their 40-man roster to protect him from being taken in the Rule 5 draft.

=== Cincinnati Reds (2022–present) ===
After impressing coaches during spring training, Greene made the Reds' Opening Day roster for the 2022 MLB season. He made his major league debut on April 10, earning the win in a 6–3 Cincinnati victory over defending World Series champions the Atlanta Braves. Greene allowed three earned runs on four hits while striking out seven batters over five innings. Facing the Los Angeles Dodgers on April 17 for his second start, Greene set an MLB record by throwing 39 pitches at speeds of 100 mph (160 km/h) or higher. The previous record was set by Jacob deGrom of the New York Mets, who threw 33 pitches at that velocity on June 5, 2021. Despite this performance, the Reds lost the game 5–2. Greene had a difficult start to his major league career, going 1–5 with a 7.62 ERA and allowing 11 home runs in his first six starts. He improved over his next six games, going 2–2 with a 3.18 ERA while allowing only four home runs. On August 1, Greene pitched six scoreless innings against the Miami Marlins. It was his third outing in which he pitched at least six innings, struck out eight or more batters while allowing no more than one hit, a record for rookie pitchers in the live-ball era. Four days later, Greene, who had previously experienced arm fatigue during his starts, was placed on the injured list with a right shoulder strain.

In 2023, Greene posted a 3.93 ERA across 14 starts before he was placed on the injured list with right hip pain on June 19, 2023. He was transferred to the 60-day injured list on July 31, and began a rehab assignment with the Arizona Complex League Reds the following day. On August 20, Greene was activated ahead of a scheduled start against the Toronto Blue Jays. He ended the 2023 season with a record of 4–7 with an ERA of 4.82 and 152 strikeouts. Greene made 26 starts for the Reds in 2024, pitching to a 2.75 ERA and a 9–5 record with 169 strikeouts across 150^{1}/_{3} innings pitched. He also made his first All-Star Team.

On April 2, 2025, Greene collected his 500th career strikeout against the Texas Rangers by striking out Jake Burger in top of the seventh inning. In the game, he suffered the loss but pitched seven innings, giving out three hits and one run, and striking out eight batters.

On May 7, Greene exited a game against the Atlanta Braves after pitching only three innings, having sustained a groin injury. A day later, it was revealed that Greene had suffered a grade 1 groin strain; he was placed on the 15-day injured list. Greene made his return from the IL on May 23 against the Chicago Cubs, where he pitched four innings, giving up three hits, two earned runs and walking a batter while striking out three. However, the Cubs scored 11 runs in the last three innings off of Cincinnati's bullpen, defeating the Reds, 13–6, and leaving Greene with a no decision. On June 3, Greene again felt discomfort in his right groin, this time during a game against the Milwaukee Brewers, and was pulled after five innings; the following day he was placed back on the IL. On September 18, Greene pitched a complete game shutout against the Chicago Cubs, striking out nine and allowing one hit and one walk.

Prior to the 2026 season, Greene experienced stiffness in his right elbow. He underwent arthroscopic removal of bone spurs and loose bodies in that arm, and began the season on the injured list. He made his first start for the Reds on July 4. Greene made five starts for Cincinnati, logging a 2–2 record and 6.83 ERA with 33 strikeouts across 27 2/3 innings pitched. On August 7, it was announced that Greene would require surgery to repair a ligament in his pitching elbow. The surgery was later revealed to be the second Tommy John surgery of Greene's career.

== International career ==
Greene first represented the United States in international youth tournaments, first at the 2014 15U Baseball World Cup in Mexico. He struck out four batters and allowed one unearned run on three hits in his first outing, a 14–2 rout of Panama. Greene took the win in the game, while his fastball reached 93 mph (150 km/h). Greene and the U.S. team were only silver medalists, however, as Cuba defeated the U.S. 10–2 in the championship match. Greene lasted only two innings in this final outing, allowing three runs on three hits while striking out two.

The year after his silver medal performance at the U15 tournament, Greene once again represented the United States at the 2015 U-18 Baseball World Cup in Japan. Greene and the U.S. won the gold medal in a 2–1 championship victory over the host team.

== Pitcher profile ==
Greene's primary pitch is his four-seam fastball. It averages around 98.4 mph (158.4 km/h), but has reached radar gun speeds up to 104 mph (167 km/h) in minor leagues. His breaking balls are a slider and a changeup. While he was in the Reds' farm system, there was some concern over Greene's ability to develop an off-speed pitch to complement his fastball. He stopped throwing a curveball in order to focus on his slider, and his command improved as he progressed through the minor leagues. His changeup was not as developed when Greene made his major league debut, with FanGraphs rating the pitch only a 40 out of 80 in 2022.

== Personal life ==
Greene and his family live in Stevenson Ranch, California. He has two younger siblings. His sister was diagnosed with leukemia when she was five years old but went into remission four years later. Outside of baseball, Greene enjoys painting and playing the violin. He has a French Bulldog, Ross.
