= CaroMont Health Park =

Baseball stadium in Gastonia, North Carolina

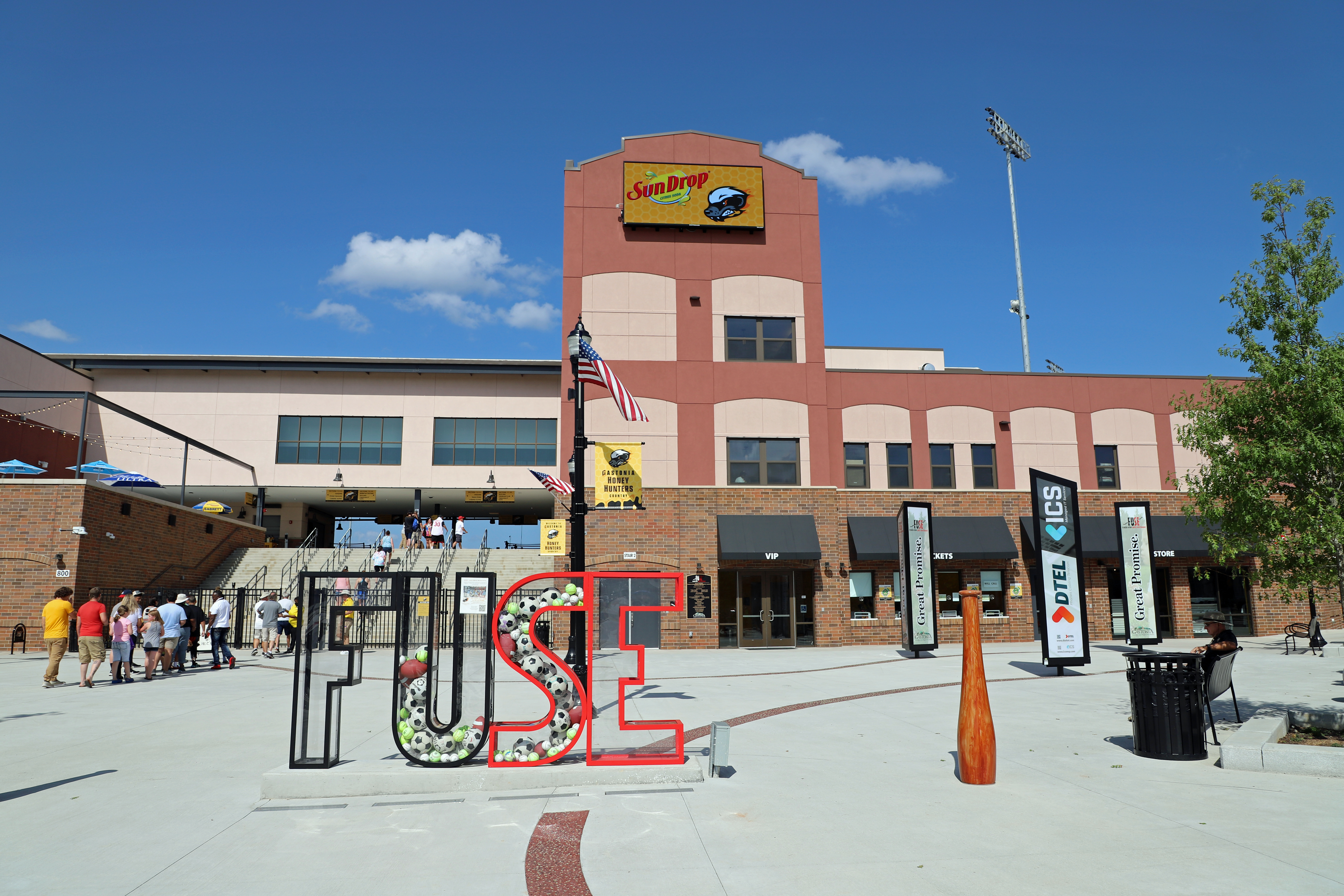
- CaroMont Park in 2021

- Location within North Carolina Location within the United States
- Interactive map of CaroMont Health Park
- Former names: FUSE District Stadium (planning stages)
- Address: South Hill Street and West Franklin Boulevard; Gastonia, North Carolina
- Coordinates: 35.26238°N 81.19503°W
- Owner: City of Gastonia
- Operator: Velocity Companies
- Capacity: 5,000
- Surface: Artificial turf
- Field size: Left Field: 315 feet (96 m); Left Center: 361 feet (110 m); Center Field: 400 feet (120 m); Right Center: 367 feet (112 m); Right Field: 325 feet (99 m)

Construction
- Groundbreaking: October 2019
- Opened: May 23, 2021
- Cost: $28.8 million
- Architect: Pendulum
- Builder: Rodgers Builders

Tenants
- Gastonia Honey Hunters (ALPB) 2021–2023; Gaston Rhinos (2022); Gastonia Ghost Peppers (ALPB) 2024–2026

CaroMont Health Park is a multi-purpose stadium in Gastonia, North Carolina which opened in 2021. It is part of a 16-acre (6.5 ha) downtown redevelopment plan known as the Franklin Urban Sports and Entertainment (FUSE) District.

The new ballpark was designed to accommodate a variety of other events, including concerts, soccer, lacrosse, and football with an artificial turf surface and a capacity of 5,000.

From 2021 to 2023, the ballpark was the home of the Gastonia Honey Hunters in the Atlantic League of Professional Baseball, an official Partner League of Major League Baseball. In May 2021, the Honey Hunters announced that the stadium would be renamed CaroMont Health Park following a ten-year naming rights deal with CaroMont Health, a regional healthcare provider that operates the CaroMont Regional Medical Center and other medical facilities. The stadium's first event was an exhibition baseball game on May 23, 2021, followed by the regular season opening day game on May 25.

In November 2023, the Atlantic League terminated the Gastonia Honey Hunters' membership and announced the league's intent to field a new team in Gastonia in 2024. In December 2023, the Honey Hunters filed for Chapter 11 bankruptcy. New owners were announced in February 2024 of a yet-to-be-named Atlantic League team to begin play at CaroMont Health Park in April. The Gastonia Baseball Club played at CaroMont Health Park on April 25, 2024, in their first game, a 3-2 loss to the Southern Maryland Blue Crabs. The Gastonia Baseball Club rebranded as the Gastonia Ghost Peppers for the 2025 season.

The Gaston College Rhinos baseball team used this stadium in early 2022 while Sims Legion Park was undergoing a renovation.

On September 30, 2026, the Ghost Peppers announced that they were ceasing operations after three seasons.

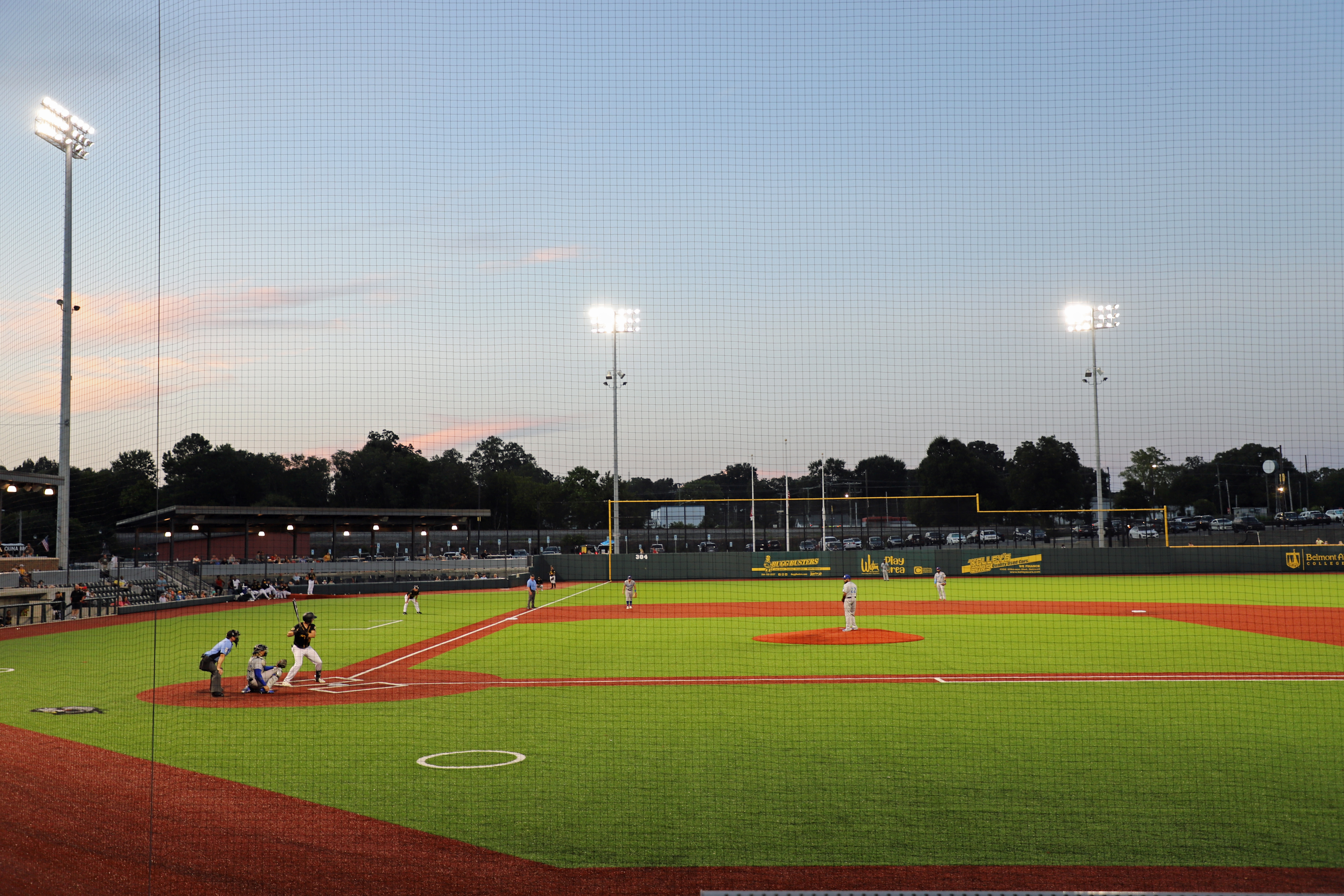
FUSE District CaroMont Park in Gastonia, NC August 29, 2021

== See also ==
- Sims Legion Park
- List of sports venues in North Carolina
