= 2014 15U Baseball World Cup =

Tournament details
- Country: Mexico
- Dates: July 31 – August 10
- Teams: 18

Final positions
- Champions: Cuba (1st title)
- Runners-up: United States
- Third place: Venezuela

Tournament statistics
- Games played: 83
- Best BA: (Japan) Shu Masuda (.556)
- Most HRs: (Mexico) Carlos Soto (2)
- Most SBs: (Guatemala) Jarlin Tecu (11)
- Best ERA: (Venezuela) Angel Ortega (0.00)
- Most Ks (as pitcher): (New Zealand) Javarn Woolston (10)

Awards
- MVP: (Cuba) Adrián Morejón

The 2014 U-15 Baseball World Cup was the second under-15 international baseball championship. It was held in Sinaloa, Mexico, from July 31 to August 10, 2014.

== Venues ==
On November 6, 2013, it was announced that La Paz, Baja California Sur would be hosting the tournament. The newly renovated Arturo C. Nahl Stadium was to be the centerpiece of the tournament. However, on June 10, 2014, it was announced that the event would be relocated across the Gulf of California to Mazatlán and Culiacán after La Paz was affected by Hurricane Amanda. When the schedules were announced, it was revealed that some games would also be played in Los Mochis. Ultimately, seven ballparks were used during the tournament. The final round, consisting of the championship and third-place game, were held at Estadio Teodoro Mariscal in Mazatlán.

Final Round
Mazatlán, Sinaloa, Mexico
Estadio Teodoro Mariscal
Capacity: 16,000
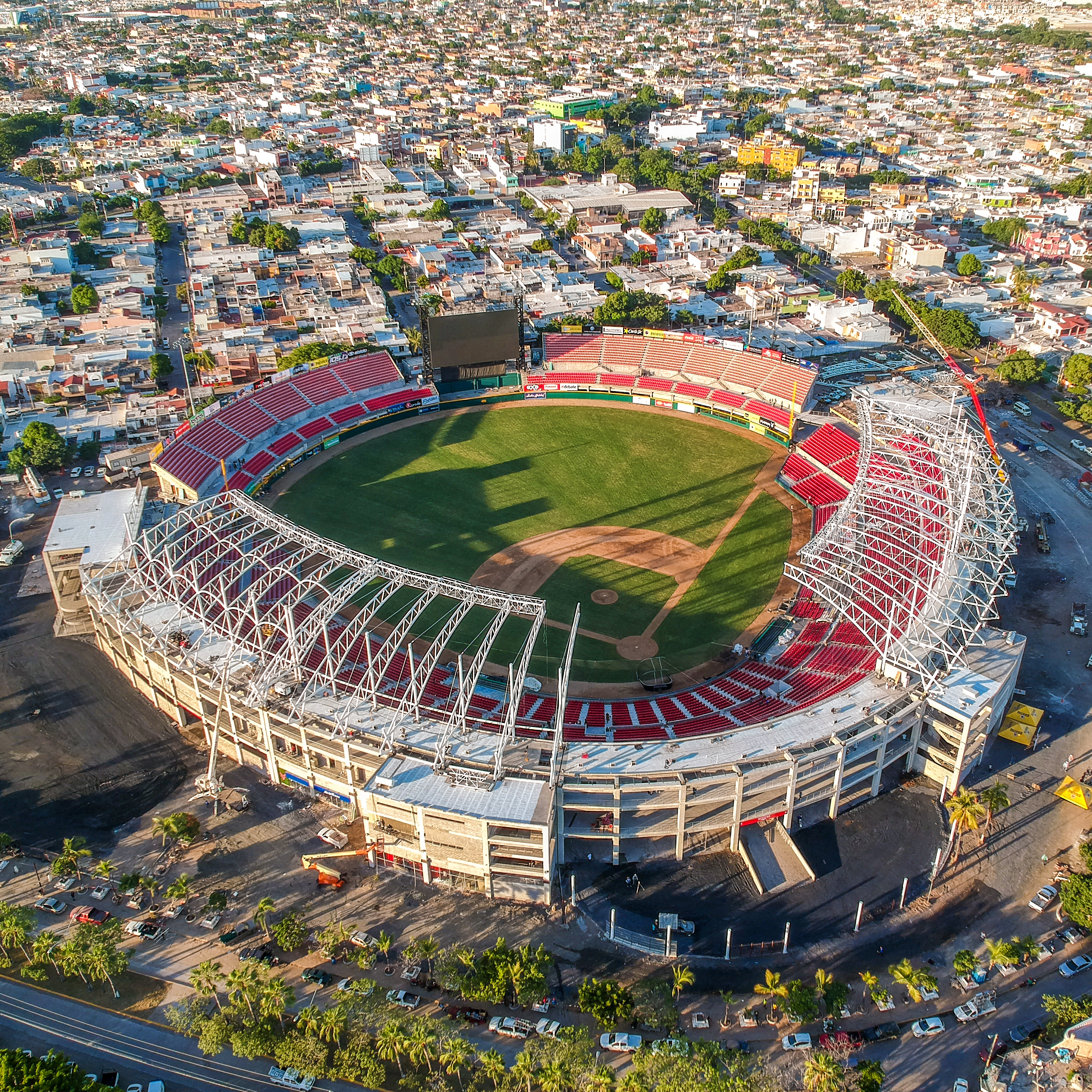

== Teams ==
On April 29, 2014, a sixteen-team field including unranked Tunisia was announced. When the groups and schedule were announced on July 24, 2014, however, it was also announced that Guatemala would be replacing Tunisia for undisclosed reasons.

| Group A | Group B | Group C |
|---|---|---|
| Chinese Taipei | United States | Cuba |
| Mexico | Panama | Venezuela |
| Brazil | Japan | Australia |
| Italy | Germany | Argentina |
| Czech Republic | New Zealand | Hong Kong |
| Guatemala | South Africa | Lithuania |

== First round ==
=== Group A ===
Group A was contested in Culiacán.

| Teams | W | L | Pct. | GB |
|---|---|---|---|---|
| Chinese Taipei | 5 | 0 | 1.000 | – |
| Mexico (H) | 4 | 1 | .800 | 1 |
| Brazil | 3 | 2 | .600 | 2 |
| Italy | 2 | 3 | .400 | 3 |
| Czech Republic | 1 | 4 | .200 | 4 |
| Guatemala | 0 | 5 | .000 | 5 |

=== Group B ===
Group B was contested in Mazatlán.

| Teams | W | L | Pct. | GB |
|---|---|---|---|---|
| United States | 5 | 0 | 1.000 | – |
| Panama | 4 | 1 | .800 | 1 |
| Japan | 3 | 2 | .600 | 2 |
| Germany | 2 | 3 | .400 | 3 |
| New Zealand | 1 | 4 | .200 | 4 |
| South Africa | 0 | 5 | .000 | 5 |

=== Group C ===
Group C was contested in Los Mochis.

| Teams | W | L | Pct. | GB |
|---|---|---|---|---|
| Cuba | 5 | 0 | 1.000 | – |
| Venezuela | 4 | 1 | .800 | 1 |
| Australia | 3 | 2 | .600 | 2 |
| Argentina | 2 | 3 | .400 | 3 |
| Hong Kong | 1 | 4 | .200 | 4 |
| Lithuania | 0 | 5 | .000 | 5 |

== Super round robin ==
=== Standings ===
| Teams | W | L | Pct. | GB |
|---|---|---|---|---|
| United States | 5 | 0 | 1.000 | – |
| Cuba | 3 | 2 | .800 | 2 |
| Venezuela | 2 | 3 | .400 | 3 |
| Chinese Taipei | 2 | 3 | .400 | 3 |
| Mexico (H) | 2 | 3 | .400 | 3 |
| Panama | 1 | 4 | .200 | 4 |

== Consolation rounds ==
=== 7th–12th ===
| Teams | W | L | Pct. | GB |
|---|---|---|---|---|
| Japan | 5 | 0 | 1.000 | – |
| Brazil | 4 | 1 | .800 | 1 |
| Australia | 2 | 3 | .400 | 3 |
| Argentina | 2 | 3 | .400 | 3 |
| Germany | 2 | 3 | .400 | 3 |
| Italy | 0 | 5 | .000 | 5 |

=== 13th–18th ===
| Teams | W | L | Pct. | GB |
|---|---|---|---|---|
| Czech Republic | 5 | 0 | 1.000 | – |
| Guatemala | 4 | 1 | .800 | 1 |
| New Zealand | 3 | 2 | .600 | 2 |
| South Africa | 2 | 3 | .400 | 3 |
| Hong Kong | 1 | 4 | .200 | 4 |
| Lithuania | 0 | 5 | .000 | 5 |

== Finals ==
=== Third-place game ===
| August 10, 2014 | Chinese Taipei | 3–13 (F/7) | Venezuela | Estadio Teodoro Mariscal; Attendance: 650 |
| August 10, 2014 | LP: Chao Ching Wan | Boxscore | WP: Angel Ortega | Estadio Teodoro Mariscal; Attendance: 650 |

| Team | 1 | 2 | 3 | 4 | 5 | 6 | 7 | 8 | 9 | R | H | E |
|---|---|---|---|---|---|---|---|---|---|---|---|---|
| Chinese Taipei | 2 | 0 | 0 | 0 | 0 | 0 | 1 | – | – | 3 | 6 | 5 |
| Venezuela | 0 | 0 | 0 | 5 | 1 | 1 | 6 | – | – | 13 | 15 | 2 |

=== Championship ===
| August 10, 2014 | Cuba | 6–3 | United States | Estadio Teodoro Mariscal; Attendance: 7,500 |
| August 10, 2014 | WP: Adrián Morejón | Boxscore | LP: Hunter Greene | Estadio Teodoro Mariscal; Attendance: 7,500 |

| Team | 1 | 2 | 3 | 4 | 5 | 6 | 7 | 8 | 9 | R | H | E |
|---|---|---|---|---|---|---|---|---|---|---|---|---|
| Cuba | 1 | 0 | 0 | 0 | 0 | 2 | 0 | 3 | 0 | 6 | 8 | 0 |
| United States | 2 | 0 | 0 | 0 | 1 | 0 | 0 | 0 | 0 | 3 | 7 | 1 |

== Medalists ==
| Event | Gold | Silver | Bronze |
|---|---|---|---|
| Tournament | Cuba; Leonides Aguilar; Lázaro Armenteros; Osvaldo Cárdenas; Arthur Chapell; Ángel Díaz; Ariel Díaz; Denzel Douglas; Martínez Ernesto; Fadraga Fadraga; Angel Francia; Jonathan Machado; Luis Meneses; Adrián Morejón; Carlos Pérez; Ramón Pérez; Pedro Portuondo; Yoris Rodríguez; Taylor Sánchez; Mailon Tomás; Vargas Vargas | United States; Kristofer Armstrong; Jacob Blas; Justin Bullock; Thomas Burbank; Noah Campbell; John Dearth; Cordell Dunn; Hugh Fisher; Raymond Gil; Hunter Greene; Royce Lewis; Austin Martin; Doug Nikhazy; Devin Ortiz; Blake Paugh; Alejandro Toral; Brice Turang; Mark Vientos; Ryan Vilade; Steven Williams | Venezuela; Gabriel Arias; Oswaldo Cabrera; Brayan Carpio; Yoanny Carrizo; Max Castillo; Gustavo Gomez; Albert Guaimaro; Abraham Gutierrez; Miguel Hernandez; Angello Infante; Jose Marcano; Rafael Marchán; Harvin Mendoza; Daniel Montaño; Jose Orta; Angel Ortega; Jefferson Perez; Peterson Plaz; Lenyn Sosa; Jose Sulbaran |

== Final standings ==
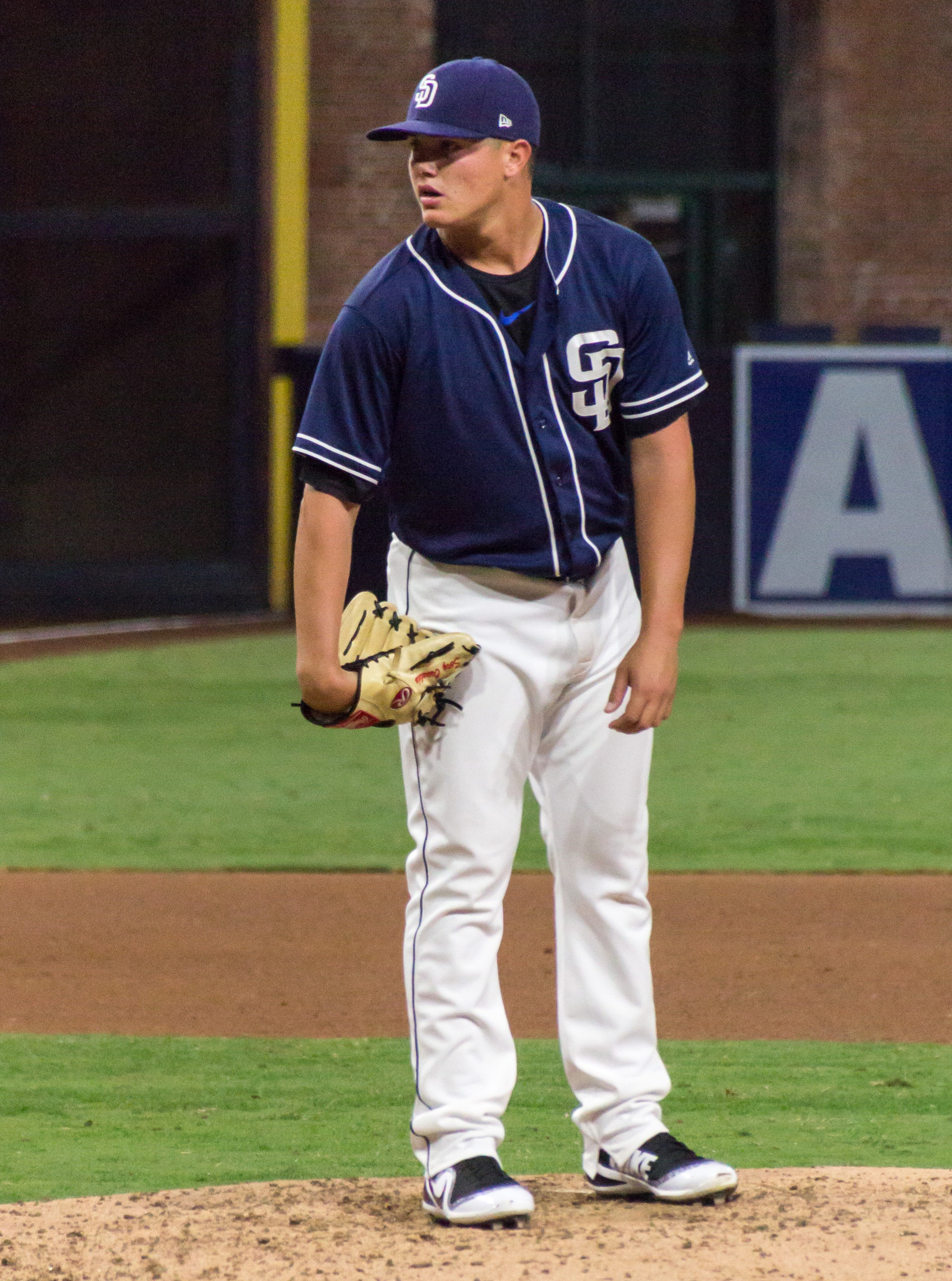
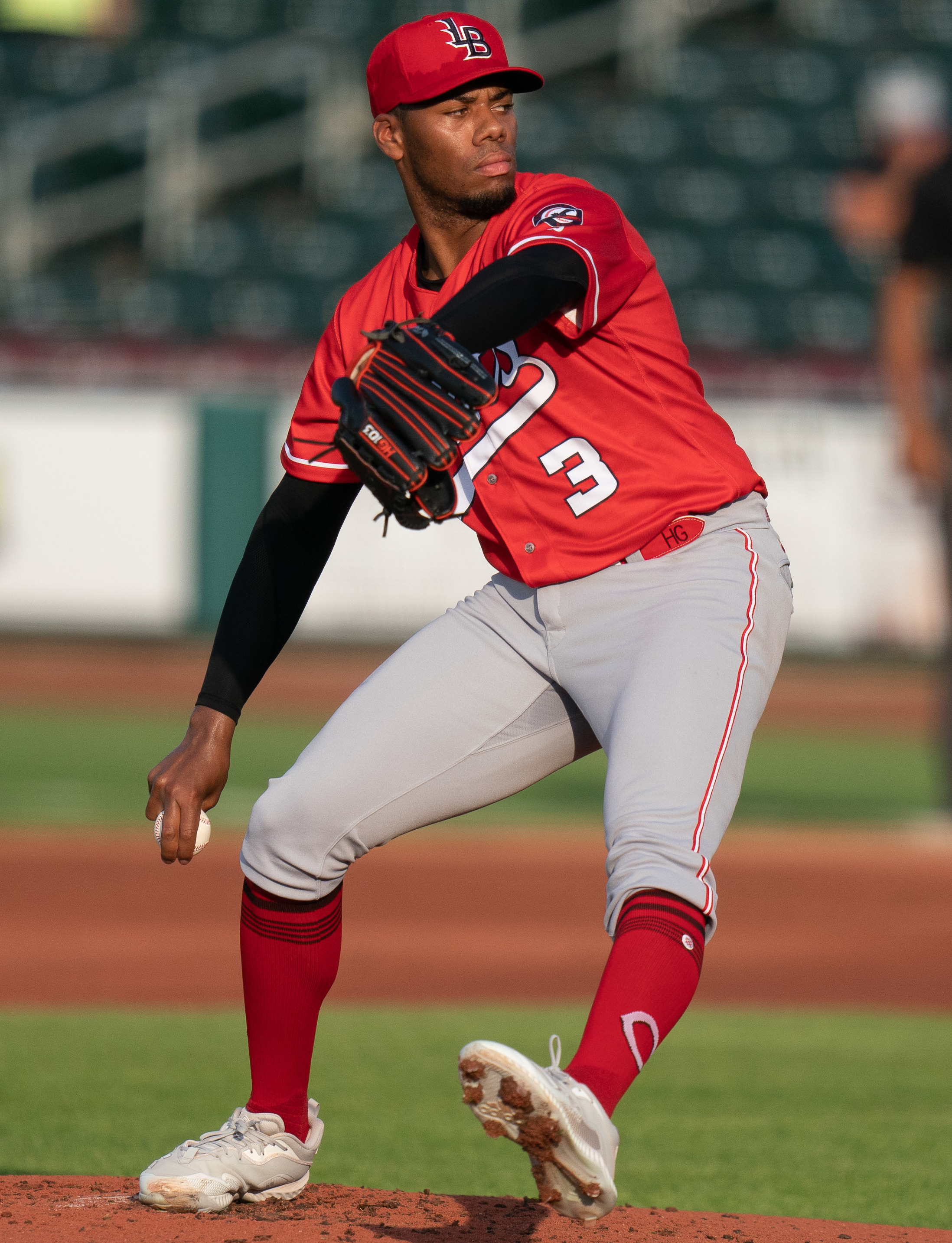
The championship game featured a starting pitching matchup between Adrián Morejón (left) and Hunter Greene (right).

| Rk | Team | W | L |
|---|---|---|---|
| 1 | Cuba | 8 | 2 |
Qualified for championship game
| 2 | United States | 9 | 1 |
Won third-place game
| 3 | Venezuela | 7 | 3 |
Qualified for third-place game
| 4 | Chinese Taipei | 6 | 4 |
Qualified for second round
| 5 | Mexico (H) | 6 | 3 |
| 6 | Panama | 5 | 4 |
Qualified for first consolation group
| 7 | Japan | 7 | 2 |
| 8 | Brazil | 6 | 3 |
| 9 | Germany | 4 | 5 |
| 10 | Australia | 4 | 5 |
| 11 | Argentina | 4 | 5 |
| 12 | Italy | 2 | 7 |
Qualified for second consolation group
| 13 | Czech Republic | 5 | 4 |
| 14 | Guatemala | 4 | 5 |
| 15 | New Zealand | 3 | 6 |
| 16 | South Africa | 2 | 7 |
| 17 | Hong Kong | 1 | 8 |
| 18 | Lithuania | 0 | 9 |
