= Chandler Seagle =

American baseball player (born 1996)

Gastonia Ghost Peppers – No. 5
- Catcher
- Born: May 23, 1996 (age 30); New Bern, North Carolina, U.S.
- Bats: Right Throws: Right

MLB debut
- September 30, 2023, for the San Diego Padres

MLB statistics (through 2023 season)
- Batting average: .000
- Home runs: 0
- Runs batted in: 0
- Stats at Baseball Reference

Teams
- San Diego Padres (2023)

Chandler Mackenzie Seagle (born May 23, 1996) is an American professional baseball catcher for the Gastonia Ghost Peppers of the Atlantic League of Professional Baseball. He has previously played in Major League Baseball (MLB) for the San Diego Padres, with whom he made his MLB debut in 2023.

== Career ==
Seagle attended New Bern High School in New Bern, North Carolina. In 2014, his senior year, the Sun Journal named him their high school baseball player of the year. He enrolled at Appalachian State University and played college baseball for the Appalachian State Mountaineers.

=== San Diego Padres ===
The San Diego Padres drafted Seagle in the 30th round, with the 888th overall selection, of the 2017 Major League Baseball draft.

Seagle spent his first professional season with the Low–A Tri-City Dust Devils and Single–A Fort Wayne TinCaps, hitting .209 in 34 total games. He returned to both affiliates in 2018, batting just .155 with no home runs and 5 RBI across 26 combined contests.

Seagle split 2019 between Fort Wayne and the rookie–level Arizona League Padres, hitting .224/.303/.345 with one home run and 13 RBI. He did not play in a game in 2020 due to the cancellation of the minor league season because of the COVID-19 pandemic. Seagle returned to action in 2021 with the Double–A San Antonio Missions, playing in 53 games and batting .190/.257/.266 with one home run and 14 RBI.

Seagle remained with San Antonio in 2022, playing in a career–high 73 contests and hitting .209/.288/.297 with 3 home runs and 22 RBI, both also career–highs. In 2023, he split the year between San Antonio and the Triple–A El Paso Chihuahuas. Across 68 total games, Seagle batted .209/.261/.296 with 3 home runs and 23 RBI.

On September 30, 2023, Seagle was selected to the 40-man roster and promoted to the major leagues for the first time. He made his MLB debut that same day as a pinch hitter against the Chicago White Sox, grounding out against Bryan Shaw in his only plate appearance. Following the season on November 2, Seagle was removed from the 40-man roster and sent outright to Triple–A El Paso. He elected free agency following the season on November 6.

Seagle re-signed with the Padres organization on a minor league contract on January 15, 2024. In 38 games for Triple-A El Paso, he batted .180/.219/.280 with one home run and five RBI. Seagle elected free agency following the season on November 4.

=== Atlanta Braves ===
On January 16, 2025, Seagle signed a minor league contract with the Atlanta Braves. He made 54 appearances split between the Double-A Columbus Clingstones and Triple-A Gwinnett Stripers, slashing a cumulative .166/.222/.221 with 14 RBI and one stolen base. Seagle elected free agency following the season on November 6.

=== Gastonia Ghost Peppers ===
On April 10, 2026, Seagle signed with the Gastonia Ghost Peppers of the Atlantic League of Professional Baseball.
