= McKinley Moore =

American baseball player (born 1998)

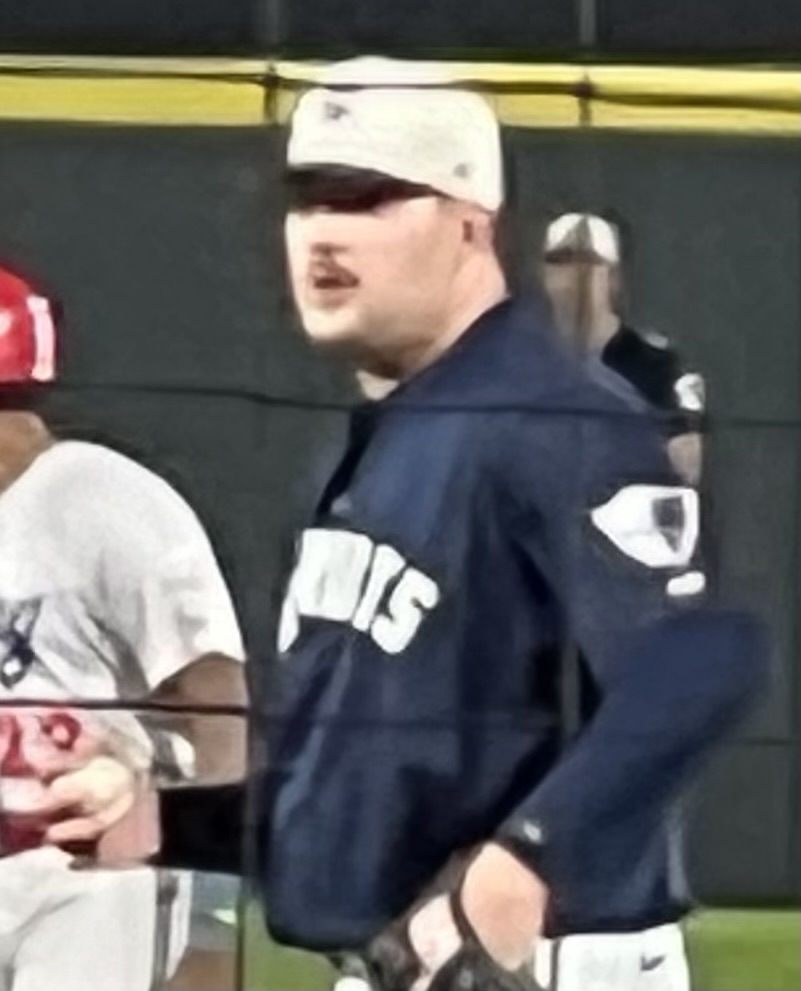
- Moore with the Somerset Patriots in 2024

Gastonia Ghost Peppers – No. 30
- Pitcher
- Born: August 24, 1998 (age 27); Houston, Texas, U.S.
- Bats: Right Throws: Right

MLB debut
- April 10, 2023, for the Philadelphia Phillies

MLB statistics (through 2023 season)
- Win–loss record: 0–0
- Earned run average: 18.90
- Strikeouts: 2
- Stats at Baseball Reference

Teams
- Philadelphia Phillies (2023)

McKinley David Moore (born August 24, 1998) is an American professional baseball pitcher for the Gastonia Ghost Peppers of the Atlantic League of Professional Baseball. He has previously played in Major League Baseball (MLB) for the Philadelphia Phillies.

== Amateur career ==
A native of Houston, Texas, Moore attended Keller High School in Keller, Texas, and the University of Arkansas at Little Rock, where he played college baseball for the Arkansas-Little Rock Trojans. In 2018, he briefly played collegiate summer baseball with the Wareham Gatemen of the Cape Cod Baseball League.

== Professional career ==
=== Chicago White Sox ===
The Chicago White Sox selected Moore in the 14th round, with the 410th overall pick, of the 2019 Major League Baseball draft. Moore played in 22 games during his inaugural campaign with the White Sox organization, splitting time between the rookie-level Arizona League White Sox and Great Falls Voyagers.

Moore did not play in a game in 2020 due to the cancellation of the minor league season because of the COVID-19 pandemic. In 2021, Moore pitched in 37 games split between the Single-A Kannapolis Intimidators and the High-A Winston-Salem Dash, logging a cumulative 2–2 record and 4.20 ERA with 59 strikeouts and 9 saves in 40 2/3 innings pitched.

=== Philadelphia Phillies ===
On March 29, 2022, the White Sox traded Moore to the Philadelphia Phillies in exchange for Adam Haseley. Moore spent the 2022 season with the Double-A Reading Fightin Phils, registering a 4–5 record and 4.35 ERA with 71 strikeouts in 49 2/3 innings of work. He was assigned to the Triple-A Lehigh Valley IronPigs to begin the 2023 season.

On April 4, 2023, Moore was selected to the 40-man roster and was promoted to the major leagues for the first time. He made three appearances for Philadelphia during his rookie campaign, but struggled to a 18.90 ERA with two strikeouts across 3 1/3 innings pitched. Moore was designated for assignment by the Phillies on February 14, 2024.

=== New York Yankees ===
On February 16, 2024, Moore was claimed off waivers by the New York Yankees. The Yankees designated him for assignment on April 25, and he was sent outright to the Triple–A Scranton/Wilkes-Barre RailRiders after clearing waivers on April 28. Moore split the remainder of the year between Scranton, the Double-A Somerset Patriots, High-A Hudson Valley Renegades, and rookie-level Florida Complex League Yankees. In 25 appearances (three starts) for the four affiliates, he accumulated a combined 3-1 record and 6.75 ERA with 25 strikeouts and one save across 21 1/3 innings pitched.

Moore made eight appearances for Scranton in 2025, but struggled to a 6.23 ERA with six strikeouts across 8 2/3 innings pitched. Moore was released by the Yankees organization on June 12, 2025.

=== Charros de Jalisco ===
On June 25, 2025, Moore signed with the Charros de Jalisco of the Mexican League. In 13 appearances for Jalisco, he recorded a 9.82 ERA with 14 strikeouts over 11 innings of work. Moore became a free agent following the season.

=== Gastonia Ghost Peppers ===
On April 19, 2026, Moore signed with the Gastonia Ghost Peppers of the Atlantic League of Professional Baseball.
