= Ljay Newsome =

American baseball player (born 1996)

Gastonia Ghost Peppers – No. 33
- Pitcher
- Born: November 8, 1996 (age 29); La Plata, Maryland, U.S.
- Bats: Right Throws: Right

Professional debut
- MLB: August 20, 2020, for the Seattle Mariners
- CPBL: August 10, 2024, for the TSG Hawks

MLB statistics (through 2021 season)
- Win–loss record: 1–2
- Earned run average: 6.53
- Strikeouts: 25

CPBL statistics (through 2024 season)
- Win–loss record: 2–3
- Earned run average: 4.54
- Strikeouts: 25
- Stats at Baseball Reference

Teams
- Seattle Mariners (2020–2021); TSG Hawks (2024)

Ljay Wyatt Newsome (born November 8, 1996) is an American professional baseball pitcher for the Gastonia Ghost Peppers of the Atlantic League of Professional Baseball. He was drafted by the Seattle Mariners in the 26th round of the 2015 MLB draft. He has previously played in Major League Baseball (MLB) for the Mariners, and in the Chinese Professional Baseball League (CPBL) for the TSG Hawks.

== Amateur career ==
Newsome attended Chopticon High School in Morganza, Maryland. He led Chopticon High School to the 2015 Maryland 3A state championship, by pitching a complete game one-hit shutout with 17 strikeouts in the deciding game. Newsome was named the 2015 Gatorade Maryland Baseball Player of the Year. He was drafted by the Seattle Mariners in the 26th round, with the 785th overall selection, of the 2015 MLB draft and signed with them.

== Professional career ==
=== Seattle Mariners ===
Newsome spent his professional debut season of 2015 with the Arizona League Mariners, going 1–0 with a 0.84 ERA over 10 2/3 innings. He spent the 2016 season with the Everett AquaSox, going 6–3 with a 4.30 ERA and 58 strikeouts over 60 2/3 innings. He spent the 2017 season with the Clinton LumberKings, going 8–9 with a 4.10 ERA and 111 strikeouts over 129 2/3 innings. Newsome was the 2017 recipient of the Mariners "60 feet 6 inch" award.

Newsome split the 2018 season between the Modesto Nuts and the Tacoma Rainiers, going a combined 6–10 with a 4.89 ERA and 125 strikeouts and 172 hits over 143 2/3 innings. He split the 2019 season between Modesto, the Arkansas Travelers, and Tacoma, going a combined 9–10 with a 3.54 ERA and 169 strikeouts over 155 innings.

On August 15, 2020, Newsome’s contract was selected to the active roster. He made his major league debut on August 20 against the Los Angeles Dodgers, pitching 3 innings of 1 run ball. Newsome finished his rookie season with the Mariners making 4 starts, earning a 5.17 ERA and 9 strikeouts and 20 hits in 15 innings in the process.

On May 13, 2021, Newsome was placed on the 60-day injured list with a UCL injury. On the season, he recorded a 7.98 ERA in 7 appearances with 16 strikeouts.

=== St. Louis Cardinals ===
On October 22, 2021, Newsome was claimed off waivers by the St. Louis Cardinals. On November 18, Newsome was removed from the 40–man roster and sent outright to the Triple–A Memphis Redbirds. He spent the 2022 season split between the rookie–level Florida Complex League Cardinals, Single–A Palm Beach Cardinals, and Triple–A Memphis Redbirds. In 11 combined appearances, Newsome logged a 4.38 ERA with 12 strikeouts in 12 1/3 innings pitched. He elected free agency following the season on November 10, 2022.

=== San Francisco Giants ===
On December 15, 2022, Newsome signed a minor league contract with the San Francisco Giants. He split the season between the rookie–level Arizona Complex League Giants, Single–A San Jose Giants, and High–A Eugene Emeralds. In 11 appearances for the three affiliates, Newsome accumulated a 2.08 ERA with 22 strikeouts across 17 1/3 innings pitched. He elected free agency following the season on November 6, 2023.

=== Gastonia Baseball Club ===
On April 30, 2024, Newsome signed with the Gastonia Baseball Club of the Atlantic League of Professional Baseball. In 11 starts for Gastonia, Newsome compiled a 5–1 record and 4.15 ERA with 54 strikeouts across 56 1/3 innings pitched.

=== TSG Hawks ===
On July 16, 2024, Newsome's contract was purchased by the TSG Hawks of the Chinese Professional Baseball League. In 8 starts, he posted a 2–3 record with a 4.54 ERA and 25 strikeouts across 39 2/3 innings pitched. Newsome became a free agent following the season.

=== Piratas de Campeche ===
On January 6, 2025, Newsome signed with the Piratas de Campeche of the Mexican League. He was released by the Piratas on April 16, but re-signed with the team on May 6. In four appearances (three starts) for Campeche, Newsome struggled to an 0-3 record and 10.43 ERA with three strikeouts across 14 2/3 innings pitched. He was released by the Piratas on May 26.

=== Gastonia Ghost Peppers ===
On June 17, 2025, Newsome signed with the Gastonia Ghost Peppers of the Atlantic League of Professional Baseball. He made 14 starts for Gastonia, compiling a 4–3 record and 5.05 ERA with 47 strikeouts over 66 innings of work.

On April 7, 2026, Newsome re-signed with the Ghost Peppers.
