= Bryson Brigman =

American baseball player (born 1995)

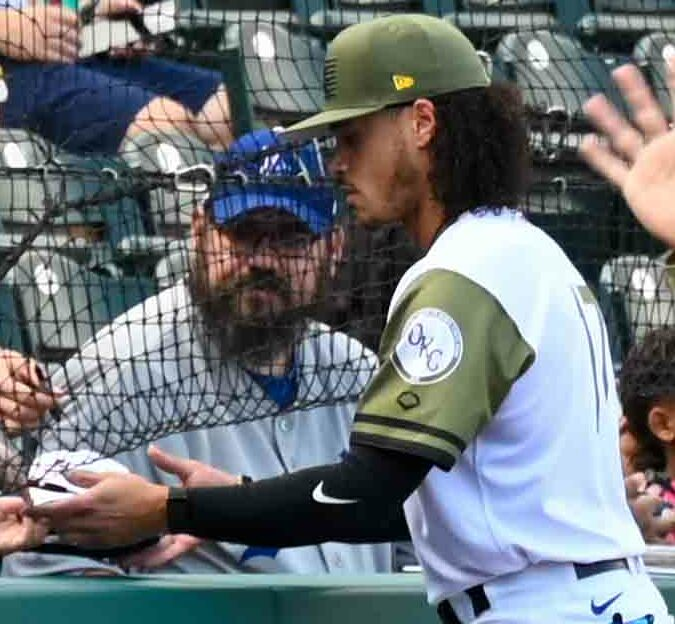
- Brigman with the Oklahoma City Dodgers in 2023

Gastonia Ghost Peppers – No. 9
- Shortstop / Second baseman
- Born: June 19, 1995 (age 31); San Jose, California, U.S.
- Bats: Right Throws: Right
Medals
Men's baseball
Representing United States
World Youth Baseball Championship
Gold medal – first place	2011 Mexico	Team
18U Baseball World Championship
Gold medal – first place	2012 Seoul	Team
18U Baseball World Cup
Gold medal – first place	2013 Taichung	Team

Bryson Michael Brigman (born June 19, 1995) is an American professional baseball shortstop for the Gastonia Ghost Peppers of the Atlantic League of Professional Baseball.

== Amateur career ==
Brigman graduated from Valley Christian High School in San Jose, California in 2014. He was drafted by the Oakland Athletics in the 40th round of the 2014 Major League Baseball draft but did not sign and instead chose to enroll at the University of San Diego where he played college baseball for the San Diego Toreros. As a freshman at USD in 2015, he slashed .339/.395/.436 with two home runs and 28 RBIs in 55 games and was named the West Coast Conference Freshman of the Year. After the 2015 season, he played collegiate summer baseball with the Orleans Firebirds of the Cape Cod Baseball League. In 2016, as a sophomore, he missed nine games due to a sports hernia but still played in 47 games, hitting .372 with 22 RBIs and 17 stolen bases. After his sophomore year, he was drafted by the Seattle Mariners in the third round (87th overall) of the 2016 Major League Baseball draft. He signed for $700,000.

== Professional career ==
=== Seattle Mariners ===
After signing, Brigman made his professional debut with the Everett AquaSox of the Low–A Northwest League where he hit .260 with 19 RBIs and 17 stolen bases in 68 games. He spent 2017 with the Clinton LumberKings of the Single–A Midwest League where he batted .235 with two home runs, 36 RBIs, and 16 stolen bases in 120 games and he began 2018 with the Modesto Nuts of the High–A California League with whom he was named an All-Star.

=== Miami Marlins ===
On July 31, 2018, Brigman (along with international pool money) was traded to the Miami Marlins in exchange for Cameron Maybin. He was assigned to the Jupiter Hammerheads of the High–A Florida State League and was promoted to the Jacksonville Jumbo Shrimp of the Double–A Southern League in late August. In 127 total games played between Modesto, Jupiter, and Jacksonville, he slashed .310/.370/.395 with three home runs, 49 RBIs, and 21 stolen bases. Brigman returned to Jacksonville to begin 2019, while also spending time with Jupiter during the year. Over 118 games between the two clubs, he slashed .253/.337/.326 with two home runs and 28 RBIs. He did not play a minor league game in 2020 due to the cancellation of the minor league season caused by the COVID-19 pandemic. For the 2021 season, he was assigned back to Jacksonville (now members of the Triple-A East) with whom he slashed .282/.361/.399 with five home runs, 33 RBIs, and 19 doubles over 104 games. He returned to Jacksonville for the 2022 season. Over 105 games, he slashed .251/.299/.369 with eight home runs and 38 RBIs. On November 10, he elected free agency.

=== Los Angeles Dodgers ===
On February 27, 2023, Brigman signed a minor league contract with the Los Angeles Dodgers. He played in 84 games for the Double-A Tulsa Drillers and Triple-A Oklahoma City Dodgers, hitting a combined .270/.363/.356 with three home runs and 38 RBI across 84 games. Brigman elected free agency following the season on November 6.

=== Arizona Diamondbacks ===
On March 16, 2024, Brigman signed a minor league contract with the Arizona Diamondbacks. He spent the year with the Triple-A Reno Aces, also playing in one game for the Double-A Amarillo Sod Poodles. In 113 appearances for Reno, Brigman slashed .334/.383/.474 with nine home runs, 61 RBI, and 10 stolen bases. He elected free agency following the season on November 4.

=== Cincinnati Reds ===
On February 7, 2025, Brigman signed with the Caliente de Durango of the Mexican Baseball League. However on April 10, prior to the start of the LMB season, Brigman signed a minor league contract with the Cincinnati Reds organization. In 45 appearances for the Triple-A Louisville Bats, he slashed .237/.313/.289 with one home run, nine RBI, and five stolen bases. Brigman was released by the Reds organization on July 14.

=== Caliente de Durango ===
On July 28, 2025, Brigman signed with the Caliente de Durango of the Mexican Baseball League. In six appearances for the Caliente, he batted .227/.320/.318 with no home runs and three RBI.

On December 18, 2025, Brigman was traded to the Dorados de Chihuahua of the Mexican Baseball League in exchange for Todd Peterson and Max Castillo. However, he failed to make the Opening Day roster and was released prior to the start of the season on April 14, 2026.

=== Gastonia Ghost Peppers ===
On May 6, 2026, Brigman signed with the Gastonia Ghost Peppers of the Atlantic League of Professional Baseball.
