= Connor Grey =

American baseball player (born 1994)

Gastonia Ghost Peppers – No. 12
- Pitcher
- Born: May 6, 1994 (age 32); Frewsburg, New York, U.S.
- Bats: Right Throws: Right
- Stats at Baseball Reference

Connor Grey (born May 6, 1994) is an American professional baseball pitcher for the Gastonia Ghost Peppers of the Atlantic League of Professional Baseball. He is currently a phantom ballplayer, having spent five days on the New York Mets' active roster without appearing in a major league game.

== Career ==
=== Arizona Diamondbacks ===
Grey graduated from Frewsburg High School in Frewsburg, New York, in 2012. He attended St. Bonaventure University, where he played college baseball for the St. Bonaventure Bonnies. Grey posted a 4.12 earned run average (ERA) over four seasons.

Grey was drafted by the Arizona Diamondbacks in the 20th round, with the 599th overall selection, of the 2016 Major League Baseball draft. He made his professional debut for the rookie–level Missoula Osprey, and was later promoted to the Low–A Hillsboro Hops, for whom he made 6 scoreless appearances.

Grey split the 2017 season between Hillsboro, the Single–A Kane County Cougars, High–A Visalia Rawhide, and Triple–A Reno Aces. In 18 games (17 starts) between the four affiliates, he combined for a 9–4 record and 2.87 ERA with 91 strikeouts across 103 1/3 innings pitched. On September 1, 2017, while playing for the Kane County, Grey pitched a perfect game against the Clinton LumberKings. It was the first perfect game in Cougars history, and was completed in 100 pitches with eight strikeouts.

Grey spent the 2018 campaign with Visalia, logging a 10–9 record and 4.54 ERA with 131 strikeouts in 27 starts. He split 2019 between Visalia, the Double–A Jackson Generals, and Reno, registering a cumulative 4.57 ERA with 51 strikeouts in 24 contests. Grey did not play in a game in 2020 due to the cancellation of the minor league season because of the COVID-19 pandemic. On May 28, 2020, Grey was released by the Diamondbacks organization.

=== Chicago Dogs ===
On January 11, 2021, Grey signed with the Chicago Dogs of the American Association of Professional Baseball, an independent baseball league. In 6 starts for the Dogs, Grey compiled a 3–2 record and 3.18 ERA with 37 strikeouts across 34 innings pitched.

=== New York Mets ===
On June 17, 2021, Grey's contract was purchased by the New York Mets organization. He made 11 appearances (9 starts) split between the High–A Brooklyn Cyclones and Double–A Binghamton Rumble Ponies, accumulating a 2–5 record and 4.00 ERA with 62 strikeouts across 54 innings.

On August 22, 2022, Grey's contract was selected by the Mets and he was promoted to the active roster. He warmed up in a game against the New York Yankees, but did not enter. On August 27, Grey was optioned back to Triple–A without making an appearance for the Mets, becoming a phantom ballplayer. He was designated for assignment by the team on September 1, following the promotion of Deven Marrero. Grey cleared waivers and was sent outright to the Triple–A Syracuse Mets on September 4. In 26 total appearances for Syracuse in 2022, Grey posted a 5–6 record and 6.38 ERA with 88 strikeouts across 104 1/3 innings pitched. He elected free agency following the season on November 10.

On January 13, 2023, Grey re-signed with the Mets on a minor league deal. Grey was placed on the injured list to begin the year after an MRI revealed a partial tear in his ulnar collateral ligament. He later underwent Tommy John surgery and missed the entirety of the 2023 season as a result. Grey elected free agency following the season on November 6.

=== Gastonia Ghost Peppers ===
On April 23, 2025, Grey signed with the Gastonia Ghost Peppers of the Atlantic League of Professional Baseball. He made 17 starts for Gastonia, compiling a 1–3 record and 4.46 ERA with 79 strikeouts across 72 2/3 innings pitched.

On April 6, 2026, Grey re-signed with the Ghost Peppers.
