= Parque de Béisbol Alberto Romo Chávez =

Stadium in Mexico

Coordinates: 21°52′48″N 102°16′27″W

Parque de Béisbol Alberto Romo Chávez (English: Alberto Romo Chavez Baseball Park) is a stadium in Aguascalientes, Mexico. It is primarily used for baseball, and is the home field of the Rieleros de Aguascalientes Mexican League baseball team. It holds 6,496 people and was built in 1938. The stadium is adjacent to Estadio Victoria.

The stadium is named in honor of Alberto Romo Chávez, a pitcher from Aguascalientes who played in the Mexican League from 1932 to 1946.
