= Gastonia Ghost Peppers =

Minor-league professional baseball team in North Carolina, US

Logo
Cap insignia

Information
- League: Atlantic League of Professional Baseball (2024–2026) (South Division (2024–2026))
- Location: Gastonia, North Carolina
- Ballpark: CaroMont Health Park (2024–2026)
- Founded: 2024
- Folded: 2026
- Colors: Red, black, green, gold, white
- Ownership: Zawyer Sports & Entertainment
- General manager: Brady Salisbury
- Manager: Mauro Gozzo
- Website: ghostpeppersbaseball.com

The Gastonia Ghost Peppers were a professional baseball team based in Gastonia, North Carolina, which began play in 2024. They competed in the South Division of the Atlantic League of Professional Baseball, a partner league of Major League Baseball. The Ghost Peppers played their home games at CaroMont Health Park, which opened in 2021. The team was known as the Gastonia Baseball Club in 2024 before becoming the Ghost Peppers in 2025.

== History ==
In November 2023, the Atlantic League terminated the membership of the Gastonia Honey Hunters, citing significant unpaid debts to the league, and announced the intent to field another team in Gastonia, North Carolina, in 2024. In February 2024, new owners of a yet-to-be-named Atlantic League team to play at CaroMont Health Park were announced. The city and Zawyer Sports & Entertainment signed a 15-year stadium lease agreement. The new team hired the general manager and manager of the Honey Hunters, as well as other coaches.

The Gastonia Baseball Club played their first game on April 25, 2024, a 3–2 loss to the Southern Maryland Blue Crabs. Their first win came the next day against the same opponent, 7–3, allowing no hits until the eighth inning.

The Gastonia Baseball Club retained that name for the 2024 season while testing seven other possible permanent names on specific "What If?" dates. The other names were Gastronauts, Bolognia, Galactic Dinos, Ghost Peppers, Zombees, Garden Gnomes, and Yarniaks. In August 2024, the team asked fans to vote for one of the names by the end of the month. The "What If?" promotion was recognized with the Atlantic League's "Promotion of the Year" award. On October 16, the team revealed its official name as the Gastonia Ghost Peppers.

On September 30, 2026, the Ghost Peppers announced that they were ceasing operations after three seasons.

== Mascot ==
On March 24, 2025, the Gastonia Ghost Peppers unveiled their new mascot "Peppy," a six foot red anthropomorphic ghost pepper with green eyes. The reveal was reported locally and nationally by Yahoo Sports on social media, as well as being commented on by Jesse Cole, the owner of the Savannah Bananas, in a YouTube short.

Peppy received the Atlantic League Mascot of the Year award on October 6, 2025.

== Roster ==
Gastonia Ghost Peppers roster
Active roster	Coaching staff
Pitchers: 25 Spencer Adams; 31 Blake Brown; 12 Connor Grey; 22 Halton Hardy; 17 Ryan Hennen; 26 Nick Horvath; 27 Eddie Leon; 35 Ethan Lindow ‡; 24 Evan Long; 2 Jake Miednik; 19 Mark Moclair; 30 McKinley Moore; 33 Ljay Newsome; 20 Nate Peden; 38 Jake Rice; Catchers: 23 Chris Proctor; 18 Jace Rinehart; 5 Chandler Seagle; Infielders: 4 Jonny Barditch; -- Bryson Brigman; 28 Xavier Casserilla; 34 Grant Lavigne; 1 Jack Reinheimer; 13 Anthony Prato; Outfielders: 3 Trenton Craig; 9 Hudson Haskin; 11 Nate Scantlin	Manager: 47 Mauro Gozzo; Coaches: 50 Tony Fossas (pitching); 8 Will Johnson (hitting); Disabled list; ‡ Inactive list; § Suspended list; Roster updated May 6, 2026 Transactions
