= Mauro Gozzo =

American baseball player, coach, and manager (born 1966)

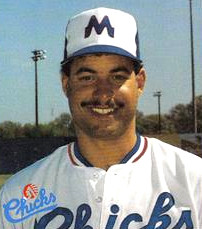
- Gozzo in 1988

Gastonia Ghost Peppers – No. 5
- Pitcher / Manager/Pitching Coach
- Born: March 7, 1966 (age 60); New Britain, Connecticut, U.S.
- Batted: Right Threw: Right

MLB debut
- August 8, 1989, for the Toronto Blue Jays

Last MLB appearance
- August 11, 1994, for the New York Mets

MLB statistics
- Win–loss record: 7–7
- Earned run average: 5.30
- Strikeouts: 55
- Stats at Baseball Reference

Teams
- Toronto Blue Jays (1989); Cleveland Indians (1990–1991); Minnesota Twins (1992); New York Mets (1993–1994)

Mauro "Goose" Gozzo (born March 7, 1966) is an American former Major League Baseball pitcher. As of 2026 he is the manager of the Gastonia Ghost Peppers. He played all or parts of six seasons in the majors, from 1989 until 1994.

== Career ==
=== Playing ===
He was selected in the 13th round of the 1984 Major League Baseball draft by the New York Mets, and was traded to the Kansas City Royals in 1987 as part of the package for David Cone. Two seasons later, he was selected by the Toronto Blue Jays in the minor league draft, and he debuted in the majors for the Jays on August 8, 1989. After his rookie season, Gozzo played two years for the Cleveland Indians and one for the Minnesota Twins. During his two games with the Twins, he had a blond mustache with brown hair, earning him the nickname of Blond Herring. He played his final two seasons for the Mets, playing his final game on August 11, 1994. (That was the last day of the 1994 season. The players' strike began the next day, and continued into 1995.

=== Coaching ===
Gozzo served as the director of the Goose's Gamers AAU baseball league in 2010. In 2018, Gozzo served as the pitching coach for the New Britain Bees of the Atlantic League of Professional Baseball. He was promoted to manager for the 2019 season following Wally Backman's departure. In 2020, he became pitching coach under manager Wally Backman for the Long Island Ducks.

On February 18, 2021, Gozzo was announced as manager of the new Gastonia Honey Hunters franchise in the Atlantic League of Professional Baseball. In 2024, he was hired as manager by the Gastonia Baseball Club when they replaced the Honey Hunters in the Atlantic League after two seasons.

== Personal life ==
Gozzo was born in New Britain, Connecticut, and graduated from Berlin High School, he moved to Wallingford, Connecticut, after his playing career ended. Gozzo has twin sons, Paul and Sal, both of whom have played college baseball.

== Sources ==
- Career statistics from Baseball Reference · Fangraphs · Baseball Reference (Minors) · Retrosheet · Baseball Almanac
