= Gastonia Honey Hunters =

American minor-league professional baseball team

- 2021–2023; Gastonia, North Carolina

Team logo	Cap insignia

Minor league affiliations
- Class: Independent (2021–2023)
- League: Atlantic League (2021–2023)
- Division: South Division

Minor league titles
- Division titles (1): 2023

Team data
- Name: Gastonia Honey Hunters (2021–2023)
- Colors: Black, gold, orange, white
- Mascot: BAM the Honey Badger
- Ballpark: CaroMont Health Park (2021–2023)
- Website: gohoneyhunters.com

The Gastonia Honey Hunters were a professional baseball team based in Gastonia, North Carolina. They played in the South Division of the Atlantic League of Professional Baseball, a "partner league" of Major League Baseball, at CaroMont Health Park in Gastonia, North Carolina.

== History ==
In 2019 the Atlantic League announced it was considering a new franchise in Gastonia. Work officially began in November 2019, for the new ballpark in Gastonia. In July 2020, the league announced the addition of a new franchise in Gastonia beginning in 2021; it would be the league's second team based in North Carolina. Brandon Bellamy was announced as the team's owner.

On August 15, 2020, a "Name the Team" contest was launched. On October 8, 2020, the names were narrowed down to Fire Ants, Hogzillas, Honey Hunters, Hotshots, and Uppercuts.

On January 13, 2021, the Honey Hunters name, logo and colors were announced. "Honey Hunters" refers to the toughness of a honey badger (Mellivora capensis) and the ability to seek out positive things in hard times. The moniker also alludes to Ransom Hunter, the first freed slave to own property in Gaston County, of which Gastonia is the county seat.

The team's first game was an exhibition on May 23, 2021, followed by the regular season opening day game on May 25.

In 2022, manager Mauro Gozzo was named Atlantic League Manager of the Year. In the off-season he signed a three-year contract extension.

On November 22, 2023, the Atlantic League terminated the membership of the team, citing significant unpaid debts to the league. On December 1, 2023, the company that operated the Honey Hunters filed for Chapter 11 bankruptcy. A new Atlantic League team replaced the Honey Hunters beginning with the 2024 season, eventually being named the Gastonia Ghost Peppers.

== Season-by-season results ==
Year	Wins	Losses	Playoffs
2021	54	66	did not qualify
2022	88	44	Lost to High Point in Southern Championship series (2-3)
2023	79	47	Lost to Lancaster in League Championship series (2-3)
