= 2022 U-18 Baseball World Cup =

Tournament details
- Country: United States
- Dates: September 9–18
- Teams: 12

Final positions
- Champions: United States (10th title)
- Runners-up: Chinese Taipei
- Third place: Japan
- Fourth place: South Korea

Tournament statistics
- Best BA: (United States) Aidan Miller (.550)
- Most HRs: (United States) Bryce Eldridge (United States) Aidan Miller (Panama) Eric Guevara (2)
- Most Ks (as pitcher): (South Korea) Seo Hyeon Kim (18)

The 2021 U-18 Baseball World Cup or the XXIX U-18 Baseball World Cup is an international baseball tournament held by the World Baseball Softball Confederation for players 18-year-old and younger held in Bradenton and Sarasota, Florida, USA. The event was originally scheduled in 2021, but due to the COVID-19 pandemic, was postponed to 2022.

== Format ==
First round: The twelve participating nations were drawn into two groups of 6, in which single round robin will occur. The top 3 nations from each group advances to the Super Round, while the bottom 3 nations from each group advance to the consolation round.

Consolation round: The 6 nations in this round play one game against the teams they have not played yet. (example: The 4th placed team from Group A will play the bottom three teams from Group B)

Super round: The format in the super round is similar to that of the consolation round. Each team plays the top three teams from the opposing group. (example: The 1st placed team from Group B will play the top three teams from Group A) The standings for this round will include the 2 games played against the 2 other second-round qualifiers from the team's first-round group, and the 3 games played in the second round, for a total of 5 games. The 3rd and 4th-place finishers advance to the bronze-medal game, and the 1st and 2nd-place finishers advance to the gold-medal game.

Finals: The Finals consist of the Bronze Medal Game, contested by the 3rd and 4th-place finishers, and the gold-medal game, contested by the 1st and 2nd-place finishers.

== Teams ==
The following 12 teams qualified for the tournament.

Pool A	Pool B
Brazil	Australia
Canada	Chinese Taipei^{1}
Netherlands	Italy
South Africa	Japan
South Korea	Mexico
United States	Panama

^{1}Republic of China, commonly known as Taiwan, due to complicated relations with People's Republic of China, is recognized by the name Chinese Taipei by most of the international organizations in sports competitions. For more information, please see Cross-Strait relations.

== First round ==
=== Group A ===
Pos	Team	Pld	W	L	RF	RA	PCT	GB	Qualification
1	United States (H)	5	5	0	50	12	1.000	—	Advance to super round
2	South Korea	5	4	1	42	11	.800	1	Advance to super round
3	Netherlands	5	3	2	20	14	.600	2	Advance to super round
4	Brazil	5	2	3	14	34	.400	3	Advance to consolation round
5	Canada	5	1	4	15	28	.200	4	Advance to consolation round
6	South Africa	5	0	5	9	51	.000	5	Advance to consolation round

Source: WBSC
(H) Hosts

Date	Local time	Road team	Score	Home team	Inn.	Venue	Game duration	Attendance	Boxscore
Sep 9, 2022	15:00	South Africa	6–7	Brazil		LECOM Park	2:28	150	Boxscore
Sep 9, 2022	19:00	Netherlands	3–9	United States		LECOM Park	2:24	300	Boxscore
Sep 10, 2022	11:00	Canada	2–3	Brazil		LECOM Park	2:13	71	Boxscore
Sep 10, 2022	19:00	United States	8–3	South Korea		Ed Smith Stadium	3:04	212	Boxscore
Sep 11, 2022	11:00	Canada	2–3	Netherlands		LECOM Park	1:50	123	Boxscore
Sep 11, 2022	15:00	South Korea	11–2	Brazil		Ed Smith Stadium	2:58	82	Boxscore
Sep 12, 2022	11:00	Brazil	2–5	Netherlands		Ed Smith Stadium	2:17	100	Boxscore
Sep 12, 2022	15:00	South Korea	14–1	South Africa	F/5	Ed Smith Stadium	1:39	200	Boxscore
Sep 12, 2022	19:00	Canada	6–7	United States		Ed Smith Stadium	3:12	282	Boxscore
Sep 13, 2022	11:00	Netherlands	0–1	South Korea		Ed Smith Stadium	1:50	100	Boxscore
Sep 13, 2022	15:00	South Africa	2–5	Canada		Ed Smith Stadium	1:28	69	Boxscore
Sep 13, 2022	19:00	Brazil	0–10	United States	F/6	LECOM Park	1:54	133	Boxscore
Sep 14, 2022	09:00	United States	16–0	South Africa	F/5	LECOM Park	1:34	134	Boxscore
Sep 14, 2022	09:00	South Korea	13–0	Canada	F/6	Ed Smith Stadium	2:07	85	Boxscore
Sep 14, 2022	12:30	Netherlands	9–0	South Africa		Ed Smith Stadium	1:56	71	Boxscore

=== Group B ===
Pos	Team	Pld	W	L	RF	RA	PCT	GB	Qualification
1	Chinese Taipei	5	5	0	38	11	1.000	—	Advance to super round
2	Japan	5	4	1	27	14	.800	1	Advance to super round
3	Mexico	5	3	2	30	27	.600	2	Advance to super round
4	Panama	5	2	3	30	25	.400	3	Advance to consolation round
5	Australia	5	1	4	14	39	.200	4	Advance to consolation round
6	Italy	5	0	5	12	35	.000	5	Advance to consolation round

Source: WBSC

Date	Local time	Road team	Score	Home team	Inn.	Venue	Game duration	Attendance	Boxscore
Sep 9, 2022	15:00	Japan	6–0	Italy		Ed Smith Stadium	1:56	187	Boxscore
Sep 9, 2022	19:00	Mexico	9–5	Australia		Ed Smith Stadium	2:48	152	Boxscore
Sep 10, 2022	11:00	Italy	1–2	Chinese Taipei		Ed Smith Stadium	2:19	300	Boxscore
Sep 10, 2022	19:00	Japan	4–1	Mexico		LECOM Park	2:01	102	Boxscore
Sep 11, 2022	11:00	Chinese Taipei	13–2	Australia	F/5	Ed Smith Stadium	2:13	101	Boxscore
Sep 11, 2022	15:00	Mexico	12–7	Italy		LECOM Park	3:11	158	Boxscore
Sep 11, 2022	19:00	Panama	4–5	Japan		Ed Smith Stadium	2:10	141	Boxscore
Sep 12, 2022	11:00	Mexico	0–4	Chinese Taipei		LECOM Park	1:55	89	Boxscore
Sep 12, 2022	15:00	Italy	0–10	Panama	F/5	LECOM Park	1:40	55	Boxscore
Sep 12, 2022	19:00	Australia	0–10	Japan	F/5	LECOM Park	1:33	43	Boxscore
Sep 13, 2022	11:00	Panama	7–8	Mexico	F/8	LECOM Park	3:17	34	Boxscore
Sep 13, 2022	15:00	Australia	5–4	Italy		LECOM Park	2:32	158	Boxscore
Sep 13, 2022	19:00	Chinese Taipei	9–2	Japan		Ed Smith Stadium	2:14	110	Boxscore
Sep 14, 2022	11:30	Chinese Taipei	10–6	Panama		LECOM Park	2:57	100	Boxscore
Sep 14, 2022	15:00	Australia	2–3	Panama	F/8	LECOM Park	1:54	98	Boxscore

== Super round ==
Pos	Team	Pld	W	L	RF	RA	PCT	GB	Qualification
1	Chinese Taipei	5	4	1	24	7	.800 (Note: Three-way tie decided by TQB)	—	Advance to final
2	United States (H)	5	4	1	30	20	.800	—	Advance to final
3	South Korea	5	4	1	21	14	.800	—	Advance to third-place game
4	Japan	5	2	3	10	22	.400	2	Advance to third-place game
5	Netherlands	5	1	4	10	18	.200	3	
6	Mexico	5	0	5	14	28	.000	4	

Source: WBSC
(H) Hosts
Notes:

Date	Local time	Road team	Score	Home team	Inn.	Venue	Game duration	Attendance	Boxscore
Sep 15, 2022	09:00	Mexico	4–7	Netherlands		LECOM Park	1:59	57	Boxscore
Sep 15, 2022	16:00	Japan	0–8	South Korea		LECOM Park	1:59	107	Boxscore
Sep 15, 2022	16:00	United States	2–6	Chinese Taipei		Ed Smith Stadium	2:12	200	Boxscore
Sep 16, 2022	12:30	South Korea	3–2	Chinese Taipei	F/8	LECOM Park	2:15	84	Boxscore
Sep 16, 2022	16:00	Netherlands	0–1	Japan	F/5	Ed Smith Stadium	1:14		Boxscore
Sep 16, 2022	16:00	Mexico	5–7	United States		LECOM Park	2:29	380	Boxscore
Sep 17, 2022	12:30	Netherlands	0–3	Chinese Taipei		LECOM Park	2:00	95	Boxscore
Sep 17, 2022	12:30	Mexico	4–6	South Korea		Ed Smith Stadium	2:35	125	Boxscore
Sep 17, 2022	16:00	Japan	3–4	United States		Ed Smith Stadium	3:01	486	Boxscore

== Consolation round ==
Pos	Team	Pld	W	L	RF	RA	PCT	GB
1	Brazil	5	4	1	22	16	.800 (Note: Head-to-head result: Brazil 3–2 Panama)	—
2	Panama	5	4	1	30	8	.800	—
3	Australia	5	3	2	25	20	.600	1
4	Italy	5	2	3	10	23	.400 (Note: Head-to-head result: Italy 3–2 Canada)	2
5	Canada	5	2	3	18	19	.400	2
6	South Africa	5	0	5	12	31	.000	4

Source: WBSC
Notes:

Date	Local time	Road team	Score	Home team	Inn.	Venue	Game duration	Attendance	Boxscore
Sep 15, 2022	09:00	South Africa	1–2	Italy		Ed Smith Stadium	1:35	150	Boxscore
Sep 15, 2022	16:00	Australia	6–7	Canada		Ed Smith Stadium	2:06	77	Boxscore
Sep 15, 2022	16:00	Brazil	3–2	Panama	F/8	LECOM Park	2:18	75	Boxscore
Sep 16, 2022	09:00	Italy	3–2	Canada		Ed Smith Stadium	2:01	85	Boxscore
Sep 16, 2022	09:00	Australia	5–4	Brazil	F/9	LECOM Park	2:43	107	Boxscore
Sep 16, 2022	12:30	South Africa	1–10	Panama		Ed Smith Stadium	2:06	25	Boxscore
Sep 17, 2022	09:00	Italy	1–5	Brazil		Ed Smith Stadium	1:48	98	Boxscore
Sep 17, 2022	09:00	Canada	2–5	Panama		LECOM Park	1:55	55	Boxscore
Sep 17, 2022	16:00	South Africa	2–7	Australia		LECOM Park	2:04	43	Boxscore

== Finals ==
=== Third-place game ===
Date	Local time	Road team	Score	Home team	Inn.	Venue	Game duration	Attendance	Boxscore
Sep 18, 2022	10:00	Japan	6–2	South Korea		Ed Smith Stadium	2:15	222	Boxscore

=== Championship ===
Date	Local time	Road team	Score	Home team	Inn.	Venue	Game duration	Attendance	Boxscore
Sep 18, 2022	10:00	United States	5–1	Chinese Taipei		Ed Smith Stadium	2:35	1,896	Boxscore

== Final standings ==
Rk	Team	W	L
1st place, gold medalist(s)	United States	8	1
Lost in final
2nd place, silver medalist(s)	Chinese Taipei	7	2
Failed to qualify for the final
3rd place, bronze medalist(s)	Japan	6	3
Lost in 3rd place game
4	South Korea	7	2
Failed to qualify for the finals
5	Netherlands	4	4
6	Mexico	3	5
Failed to qualify for the super round
7	Brazil	4	4
8	Panama	4	4
9	Australia	3	5
10	Italy	2	6
11	Canada	2	6
12	South Africa	0	8

== U-18 All-World Team ==
Position	Player
C	(Japan) Shion Matsuo
1B	(Mexico) Yael Romero
2B	(Panama) Luis Escudero
3B	(South Korea) Dae-seon Jeong
SS	(Mexico) Rosman Verdugo
OF	(Chinese Taipei) Hsin Chiu
OF	(South Korea) Jun-young Jeong
OF	(United States) Aidan Miller
DH	(United States) Bryce Eldridge
P	(Chinese Taipei) Shao-En Lin
P	(Japan) Shiki Kawahara

== Statistics leaders ==
=== Batting ===
Statistic	Name	Total/Avg
Batting average*	(United States) Aidan Miller	.550
Hits	(Mexico) Antonis Macias	13
Runs	(United States) Colt Emerson	11
Runs	(United States) Aidan Miller	11
Doubles	(Mexico) Rosman Verdugo	6
Triples	(United States) Aidan Miller	3
Home runs	(United States) Bryce Eldridge	2
Home runs	(Panama) Eric Guevara	2
Home runs	(United States) Aidan Miller	2
Runs batted in	(United States) Bryce Eldridge	10
Runs batted in	(South Korea) Dae-son Jeong	10
Runs batted in	(South Korea) Beom-seok Kim	10
Walks	(Chinese Taipei) Chih-Yu Chen	8
Walks	(Japan) Yuta Utsumi	8
Stolen bases	4 tied with	5
On-base percentage*	(United States) Aidan Miller	1.150
Slugging percentage*	(United States) Aidan Miller	.643
OPS*	(United States) Aidan Miller	1.793

* Minimum 2.7 plate appearances per team game

=== Pitching ===
Statistic	Name	Total/Avg
Wins	(Japan) Shiki Kawahara	3
Wins	(South Korea) Young-cheol Yoon	3
Saves	(Chinese Taipei) Yu-Cheng Wu	2
Innings pitched	(South Africa) Robert White	13
Earned run average*	5 tied with	0.00
Strikeouts	(South Korea) Seo-hyeon Kim	18
Walks allowed*	(Japan) Shiki Kawahara	0
Walks allowed*	(Italy) Pietro Verzin	0
BAA*	(Panama) Luis Aguilar	.059

* Minimum 0.8 innings pitched per team game
