= 2015 U-18 Baseball World Cup =

Tournament details
- Country: Japan
- Dates: August 28–September 6
- Teams: 12
- Defending champions: United States

Final positions
- Champions: United States (8th title)
- Runners-up: Japan
- Third place: South Korea
- Fourth place: Australia

Tournament statistics
- Games played: 50
- Attendance: 65,724 (1,314 per game)
- Best BA: (Japan) Shoki Katsumata (.545)
- Most HRs: (Canada) Josh Naylor (3)
- Most SBs: (South Korea) Wonjun Choi (7)
- Most Ks (as pitcher): (Japan) Sena Sato (28)

Awards
- MVP: (United States) Nick Pratto

The 2015 U-18 Baseball World Cup was an international baseball tournament held by IBAF. The 2015 edition was held in Osaka, Japan from August 28, 2015 to September 6, 2015.

== Format ==
First Round: The twelve participating nations were drawn into two groups of 6, in which single round robin will occur. The top 3 nations from each group advances to the Second Round, while the bottom 3 nations from each group advance to the Consolation Round.

Consolation Round: The 6 nations in this round play one game against the teams they have not played yet. (example: The 4th placed team from Group A will play the bottom three teams from Group B)

Second Round: The format in the Second Round is similar to that of the Consolation Round. Each team plays the top three teams from the opposing group. (example: The 1st placed team from Group B will play the top three teams from Group A) The standings for this round will include the 2 games played against the 2 other Second Round qualifiers from the team's First Round group, and the 3 games played in the Second Round, for a total of 5 games. The 3rd and 4th-place finishers advance to the Bronze Medal Game, and the 1st and 2nd-place finishers advance to the Gold Medal Game.

Finals: The Finals consist of the Bronze Medal Game, contested by the 3rd and 4th-place finishers, and the Gold Medal Game, contested by the 1st and 2nd-place finishers.

== Medalists ==
Event	Gold	Silver	Bronze
Tournament	United States; Mike Amditis; Ian Anderson; Daniel Bakst; Will Benson; Austin Bergner; Jordan Butler; Hagen Danner; Braxton Garrett; Kevin Gowdy; Hunter Greene; Cooper Johnson; Reggie Lawson; Morgan McCullough; Mickey Moniak; Nick Pratto; Nick Quintana; Ryan Rolison; Blake Rutherford; Cole Stobbe; Forrest Whitley	Japan; Wataru Funabiki; Yuya Gunji; Taiga Hirasawa; Kengo Horiuchi; Kanji Ito; Shoki Katsumata; Kotaro Kiyomiya; Masato Morishita; Kakeru Narita; Shinnosuke Ogasawara; Louis Okoye; Sena Sato; Ryo Shinohara; Naruki Sugisaki; Jumpei Takahashi; Mikiya Takahashi; Hiroshi Toyoda; Shoki Tsuda; Shotaro Ueno; Koki Ugusa	South Korea; An Sang-hyun; Choi Won-jun; Choi Sung-young; Choi Chung-yeon; Ha Seong-jin; Hwang Sun-do; Im Suk-jin; Joo Hyo-sang; Kang Sang-won; Kim Ju Sung; Kim Deok-jin; Kim Dae Hyun; Kim Pyo-seung; Lee Jin-young; Lee Young-ha; Park Jun-young; Park Se-jin; Park Sang-un; Yoon Seong-pin; Yu Jae-yu

== Teams ==
The following 12 teams qualified for the tournament. The number shown in parentheses is the country's position in the IBAF World Rankings going into the competition.

Pool A	Pool B
Japan (1)	Cuba (3)
United States (2)	Chinese Taipei ^{1} (4)
Mexico (12)	Canada (7)
Australia (14)	South Korea (8)
Brazil (15)	Italy (11)
Czech Republic (20)	South Africa (29)

^1 Chinese Taipei is the official IBAF designation for the team representing the state officially referred to as the Republic of China, more commonly known as Taiwan. (See also political status of Taiwan for details.)

== First round ==
=== Group A ===
Pos	Team	Pld	W	L	RF	RA	PCT	GB	Qualification
1	Japan (H)	5	5	0	54	1	1.000	—	Advance to super round
2	United States	5	4	1	32	8	.800	1	Advance to super round
3	Australia	5	3	2	33	22	.600	2	Advance to super round
4	Brazil	5	2	3	22	46	.400	3	Advance to consolation round
5	Mexico	5	1	4	16	40	.200	4	Advance to consolation round
6	Czech Republic	5	0	5	14	54	.000	5	Advance to consolation round

Source: WBSC
(H) Hosts

Date	Local time	Road team	Score	Home team	Inn.	Venue	Game duration	Attendance	Boxscore
Aug 28, 2015	9:00	Australia	10–0	Mexico	F/7	Nanko Chuo Stadium	2:42	100	
Aug 28, 2015	12:30	Czech Republic	1–11	United States	F/7	Toyonaka Rose Baseball Stadium	2:12	618	
Aug 28, 2015	18:00	Brazil	0–14	Japan	F/7	Maishima Baseball Stadium	2:37	3500	
Aug 29, 2015	10:00	Czech Republic	4–8	Mexico		Nanko Chuo Stadium	2:43	112	
Aug 29, 2015	15:30	Australia	11–1	Brazil		Toyonaka Rose Baseball Stadium	2:50	703	
Aug 29, 2015	18:30	United States	0–3	Japan		Maishima Baseball Stadium	2:50	5500	
Aug 30, 2015	10:00	Mexico	1–5	United States		Nanko Chuo Stadium	2:46	150	
Aug 30, 2015	10:00	Czech Republic	9–10	Brazil		Toyonaka Rose Baseball Stadium	3:43	160	
Aug 30, 2015	17:30	Australia	1–10	Japan		Maishima Baseball Stadium	2:54	7804	
Aug 31, 2015	10:00	Brazil	9–7	Mexico		Nanko Chuo Stadium	2:45	100	
Aug 31, 2015	15:30	United States	11–1	Australia	F/8	Toyonaka Rose Baseball Stadium	3:05	703	
Aug 31, 2015	17:30	Czech Republic	0–15	Japan	F/7	Maishima Baseball Stadium	2:30	2000	
Sep 1, 2015	10:00	United States	5–2	Brazil		Nanko Chuo Stadium	2:45	130	
Sep 1, 2015	10:00	Australia	10–0	Czech Republic	F/8	Toyonaka Rose Baseball Stadium	2:35	130	
Sep 1, 2015	17:30	Mexico	0–12	Japan	F/7	Maishima Baseball Stadium	2:19	2347	

=== Group B ===
Pos	Team	Pld	W	L	RF	RA	PCT	GB	Qualification
1	South Korea	5	5	0	42	13	1.000	—	Advance to super round
2	Cuba	5	4	1	28	8	.800	1	Advance to super round
3	Canada	5	3	2	30	29	.600	2	Advance to super round
4	Chinese Taipei	5	2	3	33	15	.400	3	Advance to consolation round
5	Italy	5	1	4	17	38	.200	4	Advance to consolation round
6	South Africa	5	0	5	15	62	.000	5	Advance to consolation round

Source: WBSC

Date	Local time	Road team	Score	Home team	Inn.	Venue	Game duration	Attendance	Boxscore
Aug 28, 2015	9:00	Cuba	4–1	Italy		Toyonaka Rose Baseball Stadium	2:41	527	
Aug 28, 2015	11:00	South Africa	2–17	South Korea	F/5	Maishima Baseball Stadium	2:30	300	
Aug 28, 2015	12:30	Canada	6–2	Chinese Taipei		Nanko Chuo Stadium	2:57	100	
Aug 29, 2015	10:00	South Africa	0–7	Cuba		Toyonaka Rose Stadium	2:22	647	
Aug 29, 2015	12:00	South Korea	6–2	Canada		Maishima Baseball Stadium	2:51	500	
Aug 29, 2015	15:30	Italy	1–11	Chinese Taipei	F/7	Nanko Chuo Baseball Stadium	2:38	186	
Aug 30, 2015	12:00	Cuba	3–4	South Korea	F/10	Toyonaka Rose Baseball Stadium	3:03	647	
Aug 30, 2015	15:30	Chinese Taipei	15–1	South Africa	F/7	Maishima Baseball Stadium	2:26	200	
Aug 30, 2015	15:30	Italy	0–10	Canada	F/8	Nanko Chuo Stadium	2:32	300	
Aug 31, 2015	10:00	Italy	12–2	South Africa		Toyonaka Rose Baseball Stadium	2:51	327	
Aug 31, 2015	12:00	South Korea	4–3	Chinese Taipei		Maishima Baseball Stadium	2:55	180	
Aug 31, 2015	15:30	Canada	1–11	Cuba	F/7	Nanko Chuo Baseball Stadium	2:07	200	
Sep 1, 2015	12:00	South Korea	11–3	Italy		Maishima Baseball Stadium	3:02	637	
Sep 1, 2015	15:30	Chinese Taipei	2–3	Cuba		Nanko Chuo Stadium	2:57	150	
Sep 1, 2015^{1}	15:30	South Africa	10–11	Canada		Toyonaka Rose Baseball Stadium	2:50	647	

^{1}Game suspended and completed on September 2

== Super round ==
Pos	Team	Pld	W	L	RF	RA	PCT	GB	Qualification
1	Japan (H)	5	5	0	39	3	1.000	—	Advance to final
2	United States	5	4	1	33	18	.800	1	Advance to final
3	South Korea	5	3	2	17	24	.600	2	Advance to third-place game
4	Australia	5	1	4	12	38	.200 (Note: Three-way tie decided by TQB)	4	Advance to third-place game
5	Cuba	5	1	4	23	27	.200	4	
6	Canada	5	1	4	20	34	.200	4	

Source: WBSC
(H) Hosts
Notes:

Date	Local time	Road team	Score	Home team	Inn.	Venue	Game duration	Attendance	Boxscore
Sep 3, 2015	12:00	United States	7–4	South Korea		Maishima Baseball Stadium	3:56	300	
Sep 3, 2015	15:30	Australia	7–4	Cuba	F/10	Nanko Chuo Stadium	3:23	703	
Sep 3, 2015	17:30	Canada	2–5	Japan		Maishima Baseball Stadium	2:49	1500	
Sep 4, 2015	12:00	Canada	10–3	Australia		Maishima Baseball Stadium	2:46	527	
Sep 4, 2015	13:00	Cuba	5–6	United States		Hanshin Koshien Stadium	2:55	500	
Sep 4, 2015	18:00	South Korea	0–12	Japan	F/7	Hanshin Koshien Stadium	2:29	7000	
Sep 5, 2015	12:00	Australia	0–3	South Korea		Maishima Baseball Stadium	2:26	70	
Sep 5, 2015	13:00	Cuba	0–9	Japan		Hanshin Koshien Stadium	2:39	8000	
Sep 5, 2015	18:00	Canada	5–9	United States		Hanshin Koshien Stadium	3:10	350	

== Consolation round ==
Pos	Team	Pld	W	L	RF	RA	PCT	GB
1	Mexico	5	4	1	26	19	.800 (Note: Head-to-head result: Mexico 2–1 Chinese Taipei)	—
2	Chinese Taipei	5	4	1	36	4	.800	—
3	Brazil	5	3	2	29	36	.600	1
4	Italy	5	2	3	29	30	.400	2
5	Czech Republic	5	1	4	22	28	.200 (Note: Head-to-head result: Czech Republic 4–2 South Africa)	3
6	South Africa	5	1	4	13	38	.200	3

Source: WBSC
Notes:

Date	Local time	Road team	Score	Home team	Inn.	Venue	Game duration	Attendance	Boxscore
Sep 3, 2015	10:00	Czech Republic	0–1	Chinese Taipei	F/5	Nanko Chuo Stadium	1:10	303	
Sep 3, 2015	10:00	Italy	6–8	Brazil		Toyonaka Rose Baseball Stadium	3:24	69	
Sep 4, 2015	10:00	Czech Republic	4–2	South Africa		Toyonaka Rose Baseball Stadium	2:32	110	
Sep 4, 2015^{1}	13:30	South Africa	2–5	Mexico		Toyonaka Rose Baseball Stadium	2:48	100	
Sep 4, 2015	16:30	Mexico	5–3	Italy		Toyonaka Rose Baseball Stadium	3:15	60	
Sep 4, 2015	17:30	Brazil	0–8	Chinese Taipei		Maishima Baseball Stadium	2:59	303	
Sep 5, 2015	10:00	South Africa	6–2	Brazil		Toyonaka Rose Baseball Stadium	2:23	527	
Sep 5, 2015	15:30	Czech Republic	4–7	Italy		Toyonaka Rose Baseball Stadium	2:37	527	
Sep 5, 2015	17:30	Mexico	2–1	Chinese Taipei		Maishima Baseball Stadium	2:15	100	

^{1}Game suspended and completed on September 4

== Finals ==
=== Third-place game ===
Date	Local time	Road team	Score	Home team	Inn.	Venue	Game duration	Attendance	Boxscore
Sep 6, 2015	10:00	Australia	5–8	South Korea		Maishima Baseball Stadium	3:08	70	

=== Championship ===
Date	Local time	Road team	Score	Home team	Inn.	Venue	Game duration	Attendance	Boxscore
Sep 6, 2015	19:30^{1}	United States	2–1	Japan		Koshien Stadium	2:40	15,000	

^{1}The game was originally scheduled to begin at 18:10, but was delayed by rain.

== Final standings ==
Rk	Team
1st place, gold medalist(s)	United States
Lost in final
2nd place, silver medalist(s)	Japan
Failed to qualify for the final
3rd place, bronze medalist(s)	South Korea
Lost in 3rd place game
4	Australia
Failed to qualify for the finals
5	Cuba
6	Canada
Failed to qualify for the super round
7	Mexico
8	Chinese Taipei
9	Brazil
10	Italy
11	Czech Republic
12	South Africa

== Awards ==
Awards	Player
Most Valuable Player	(United States) Nick Pratto
Outstanding Defensive Player	(Japan) Louis Okoye

All-Tournament Team
Position	Player
Starting Pitcher	(Japan) Sena Sato
Relief Pitcher	(United States) Reggie Lawson
Catcher	(Japan) Kengo Horiuchi
First Base	(Canada) Josh Naylor
Second Base	(Cuba) Jose Garcia
Third Base	(Japan) Ryo Shinohara
Shortstop	(Japan) Taiga Hirasawa
Outfield	(Japan) Shoki Katsumata
Outfield	(United States) Blake Rutherford
Outfield	(Cuba) Luis Robert
Designated Hitter	(Australia) Tristan King
