= Louis Okoye =

Japanese baseball player (born 1997)

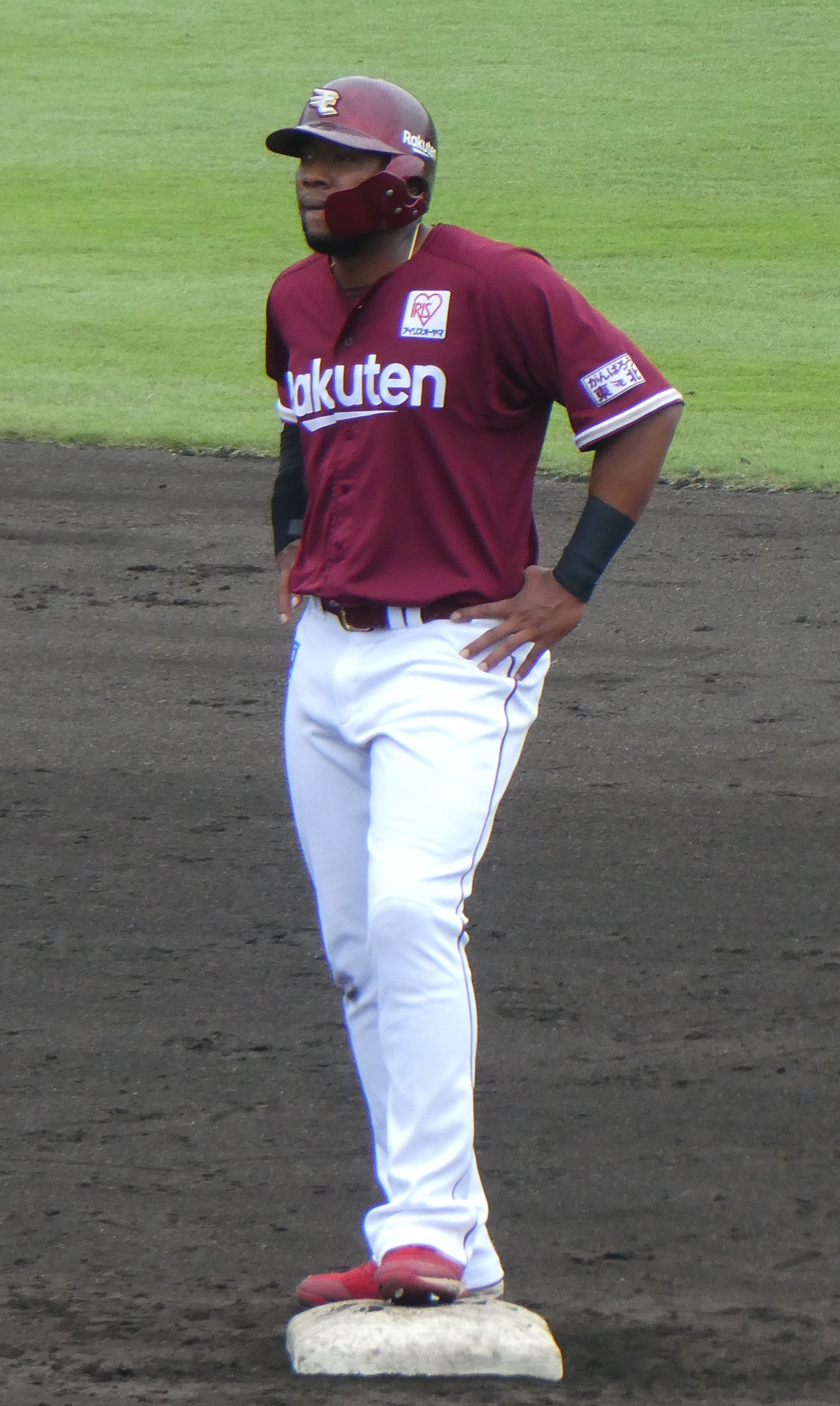
- Okoye with the Tohoku Rakuten Golden Eagles in 2022

Free agent
- Outfielder
- Born: July 21, 1997 (age 28); Higashimurayama, Tokyo, Japan
- Bats: Right Throws: Right

NPB debut
- March 25, 2016, for the Tohoku Rakuten Golden Eagles

NPB statistics (through 2025 season)
- Batting average: .230
- Home runs: 14
- Runs batted in: 68
- Stats at Baseball Reference

Teams
- Tohoku Rakuten Golden Eagles (2016–2022); Yomiuri Giants (2023–2025)
Medals
Representing Japan
U-18 Baseball World Cup
Silver medal – second place	2015 Osaka	Team

Louis Okoye (オコエ 瑠偉, Okoe Rui; born July 21, 1997) // is a Japanese professional baseball outfielder who is a free agent. He previously played in Nippon Professional Baseball (NPB) for the Tohoku Rakuten Golden Eagles and Yomiuri Giants.

== Career ==
=== Tohoku Rakuten Golden Eagles ===
Okoye was selected by the Tohoku Rakuten Golden Eagles in the first round of the 2015 Nippon Professional Baseball draft; the pick was compensation for the Eagles losing the lottery to select Taiga Hirasawa. On June 22, 2016, Okoye hit his first career home run off of Shōta Imanaga of the Yokohama DeNA BayStars. In 51 appearances for the team during his rookie campaign, he batted .185/.233/.294 with one home run, six RBI, and four stolen bases.

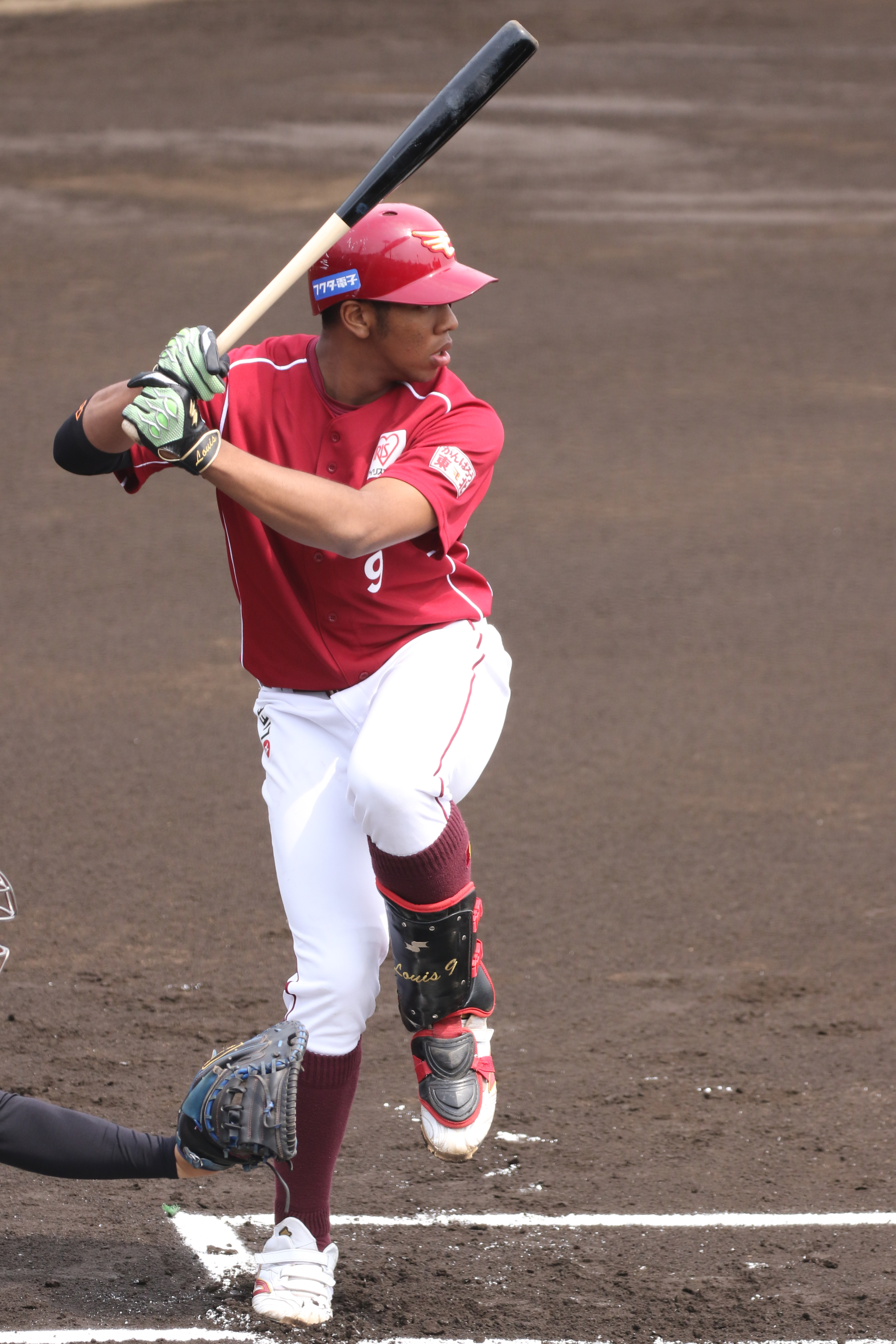
Okoye in 2016

Okoye played in 41 games for Rakuten during the 2017 season, hitting .300/.331/.500 with three home runs, 11 RBI, and five stolen bases. After the season, Okoye joined the Cañeros de Los Mochis of the Mexican Pacific League. Returning to the club in 2018, he slashed .198/.219/.333 with two home runs, six RBI, and two stolen bases across 44 contests.

On August 13, 2019, Okoye hit for the cycle while playing for Rakuten's farm team, the first in team history. He made 52 appearances for the Eagles during the year, hitting .182/.242/.300 with three home runs, 15 RBI, and five stolen bases. Okoye did not make an appearance for the main club during the 2020 season, which was affected by the COVID-19 pandemic.

Okoye made 46 appearances for Rakuten during the 2021 season, slashing .223/.291/.234 with six RBI and three stolen bases. He played in only six games for the Eagles in 2022, going 5-for-25 (.200) with one stolen base.

=== Yomiuri Giants ===
On December 9, 2022, the NPB held its first ever "active player draft," similar to Major League Baseball's Rule 5 draft; in the draft, Okoye was selected by the Yomiuri Giants. He made 41 appearances for the Giants in 2023, batting .235/.278/.345 with two home runs, six RBI, and one stolen base. Okoye played in 68 games for Yomiuri during the 2024 campaign, slashing .261/.309/.391 with three home runs, 13 RBI, and four stolen bases.

On May 2, 2025, Okoye underwent an arthroscopic removal of loose bodies in his right elbow, and was ruled out for two months. He made 61 appearances for Yomiuri during the regular season, batting .246/.291/.310 with five RBI and three stolen bases. On November 29, the Giants released Okoye so he could pursue overseas opportunities.

=== Sultanes de Monterrey ===
On February 11, 2026, Okoye signed with the Sultanes de Monterrey of the Mexican League. He made two appearances for Monterrey, going 0-for-6. Okoye was released by the Sultanes on May 1.

=== Tigres de Quintana Roo ===
On May 10, 2026, Okoye signed with the Tigres de Quintana Roo of the Mexican League. In seven appearances for Quintana Roo, he went 2-for-16 (.125) at the plate with one RBI. Okoye was released by the Tigres on May 21.

== Personal life ==
Okoye's mother is Japanese and his father is Igbo from Nigeria. His younger sister Monica Okoye is a member of the Japan women's national basketball team which won a silver medal at the 2020 Olympics in Tokyo.
