= Koki Ugusa =

Japanese baseball player (born 1997)

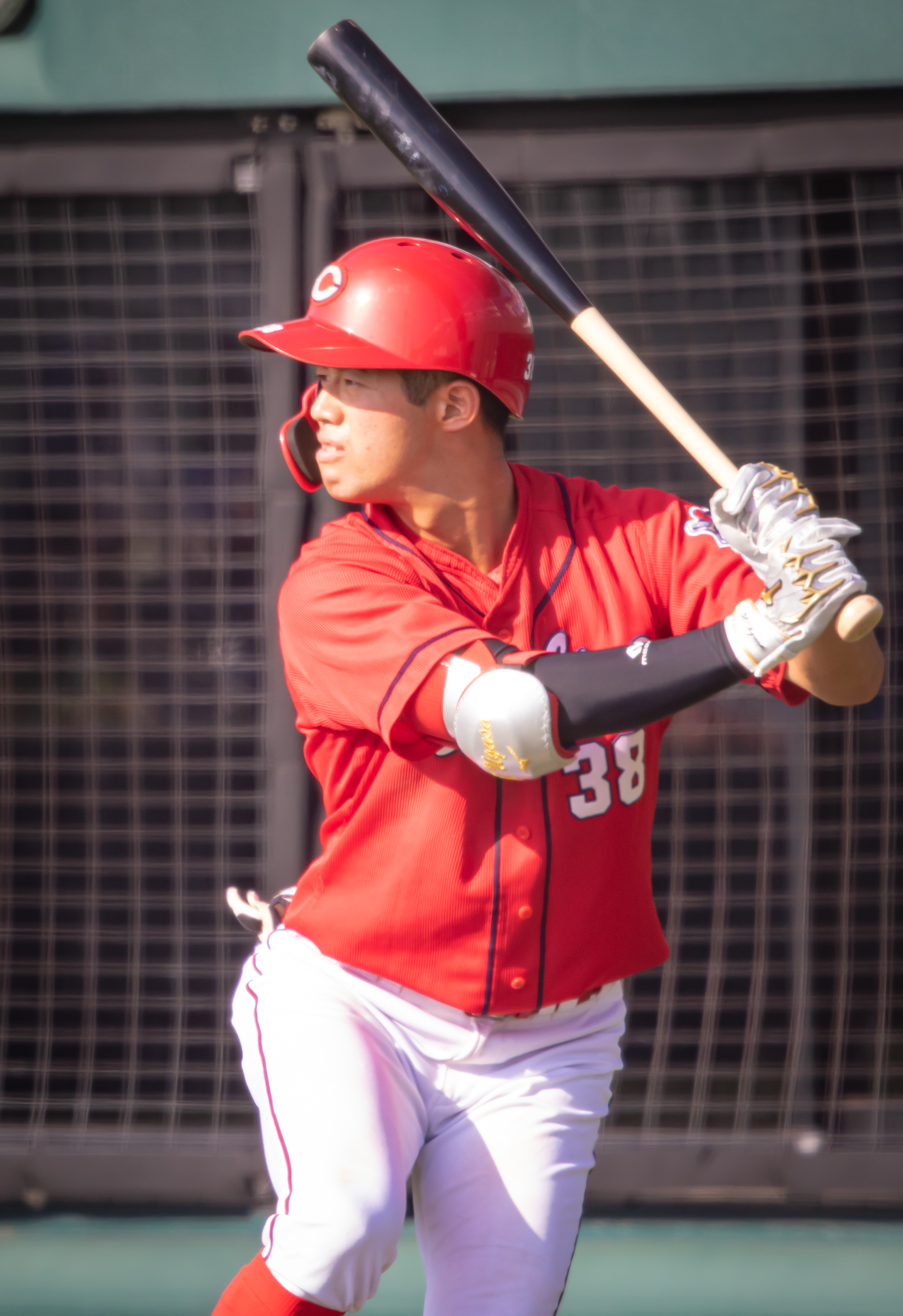
- Outfielder
- Born: April 17, 1997 (age 28); Sumida, Tokyo, Japan
- Bats: Left Throws: Right

NPB debut
- October 6, 2020, for the Hiroshima Toyo Carp

NPB statistics (through 2025 season)
- Batting average: .255
- Home runs: 8
- Runs batted in: 31
- Stats at Baseball Reference

Teams
- Hiroshima Toyo Carp (2020–2025)
Medals
Men's baseball
Representing Japan
U-18 Baseball World Cup
Silver medal – second place	2015 Osaka	Team

Koki Ugusa (宇草 孔基, Ugusa Koki; born April 17, 1997) is a Japanese baseball pitcher for the Hiroshima Toyo Carp of Nippon Professional Baseball.

Ugusa played for Japan in the 2015 U-18 Baseball World Cup, and graduated from Joso Gakuin High School. He then attended Hosei University, and played for the school's baseball team. After playing in the USA vs. Japan Collegiate All-Star Series, Ugusa was selected by the Hiroshima Toyo Carp in the 2019 Nippon Professional Baseball draft as the team's second pick. Ugusa split the 2020 season between the Carp and their Western League affiliate. In his second professional season, Ugusa again spent time in the NPB and Western League.
