= Kōtarō Kiyomiya =

Japanese baseball player (born 1999)

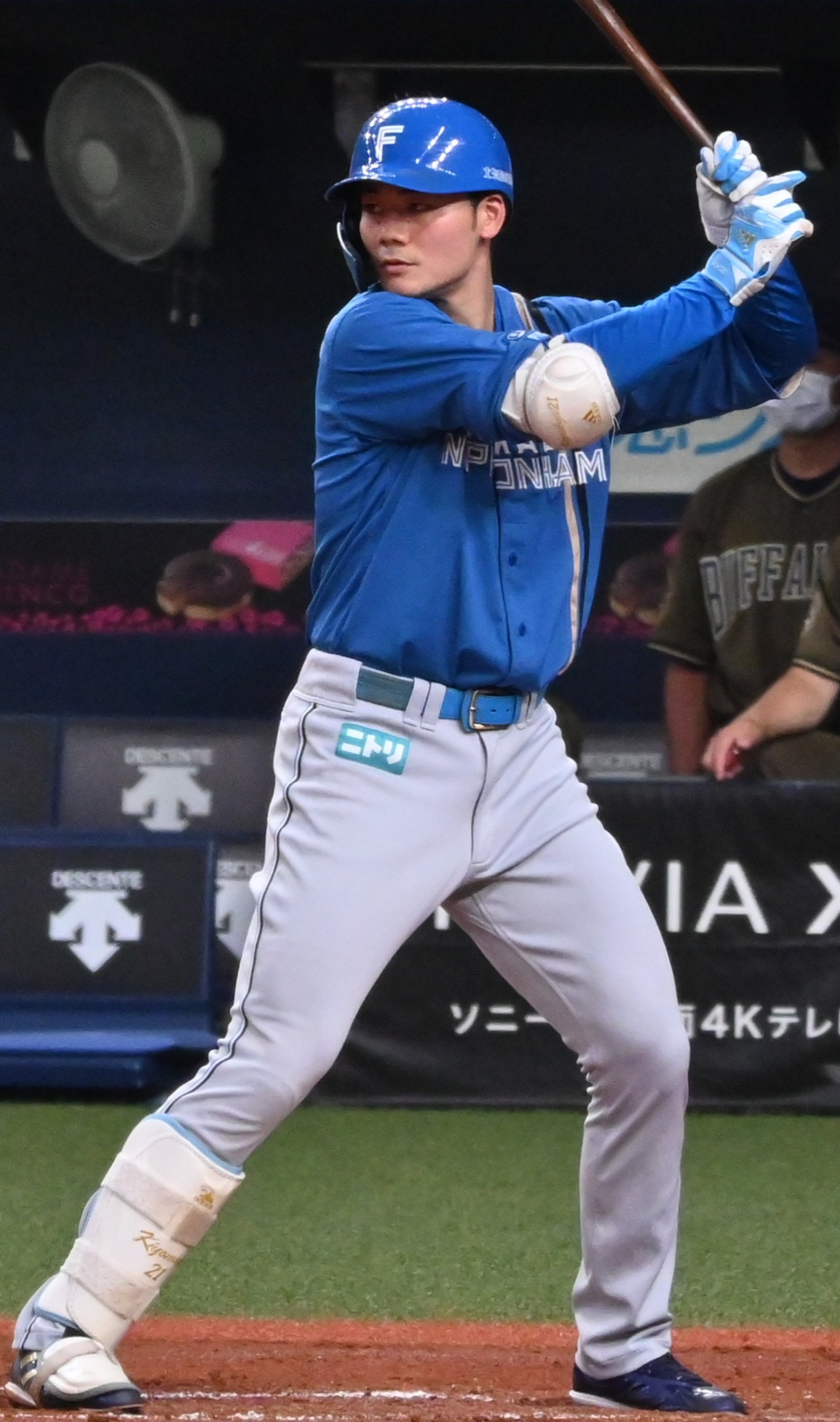
- Kōtarō Kiyomiya with the Fighters in 2022

Hokkaido Nippon-Ham Fighters – No. 21
- Infielder
- Born: May 25, 1999 (age 27); Tokyo, Japan
- Bats: Left Throws: Right

NPB debut
- May 2, 2018, for the Hokkaido Nippon-Ham Fighters

NPB statistics (through 2025 season)
- Batting average: .240
- Hits: 532
- Home runs: 76
- Runs batted in: 285
- Stats at Baseball Reference

Teams
- Hokkaido Nippon-Ham Fighters (2018–present)

Career highlights and awards
- 2× NPB All-Star (2022, 2025); NPB All-Star MVP (2022)
Medals
Men's baseball
Representing Japan
U-18 Baseball World Cup
Silver medal – second place	2015 Osaka	Team
Bronze medal – third place	2017 Thunder Bay	Team

Kōtarō Kiyomiya (清宮 幸太郎; born May 25, 1999) is a Japanese professional baseball first baseman for the Hokkaido Nippon-Ham Fighters of Nippon Professional Baseball (NPB). A left-handed batter and right-handed thrower, Kotaro stands 6 feet 0 inches (1.83 m) tall and weighs 225 pounds (102 kg). He was the first pick of the Fighters in the 2017 draft. He is the son of Japanese rugby union coach, Katsuyuki Kiyomiya.

== Early career ==
Kiyomiya drew major news attention in the 2012 Little League World Series, where at the age of 13 he employed an 80 mph fastball (major league equivalent of throwing 104 MPH) to lead Team Japan to a 12–2 LLWS championship win over the team from Goodlettsville, Tennessee. He was also noted to have hit 60 home runs in 50 games Kiyomiya then went to Waseda Jitsugyo High School where he set the Japanese high school baseball record for home runs with 111 home runs over three seasons in high school. On August 23, 2017, it was announced that he would serve as captain of Samurai Japan for the 2017 U-18 Baseball World Cup.

== Professional career ==
=== Hokkaido Nippon-Ham Fighters ===
Seven teams chose Kotaro in the first round of the 2017 NPB draft, the Hokkaido Nippon-Ham Fighters won the right to negotiate with Kiyomiya by winning the lottery. Kotaro then chose the jersey number 21.

On February 27, 2019, he was selected for Japan national baseball team at the 2019 exhibition games against Mexico, but on March 4, 2019, he canceled his participation due to broken right hamate bone.
