= Shion Matsuo =

Japanese baseball player (born 2004)

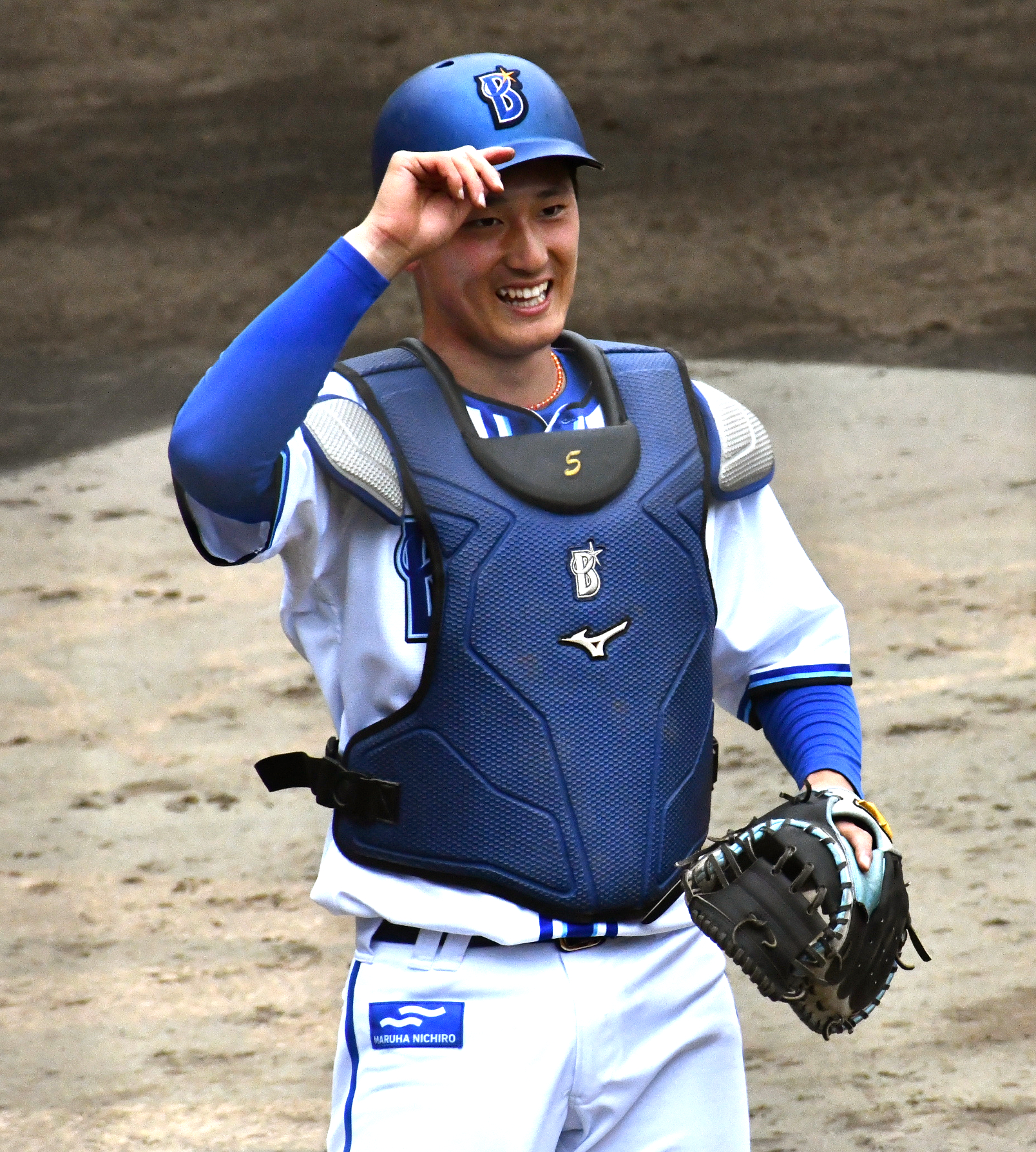
- Matsuo with the Yokohama DeNA BayStars

Yokohama DeNA BayStars – No. 5
- Catcher
- Born: July 6, 2004 (age 21); Sōraku, Kyoto, Japan
- Bats: Right Throws: Right

NPB debut
- March 31, 2024, for the Yokohama DeNA BayStars

Career statistics (through 2025 season)
- Batting average: .243
- Home runs: 4
- Runs batted in: 19

Teams
- Yokohama DeNA BayStars (2023–present)

Career highlights and awards
- Japan Series champion (2024)
Medals
Men's baseball
Representing Japan
U-18 Baseball World Cup
Bronze medal – third place	2022 Sarasota-Bradenton	Team

Shion Matsuo (松尾 汐恩, Matsuo Shion; born July 6, 2004 in Sōraku, Kyoto, Japan) is a Japanese professional baseball catcher for the Yokohama DeNA BayStars of Nippon Professional Baseball (NPB).
