= Tommy Kahnle =

American baseball player (born 1989)

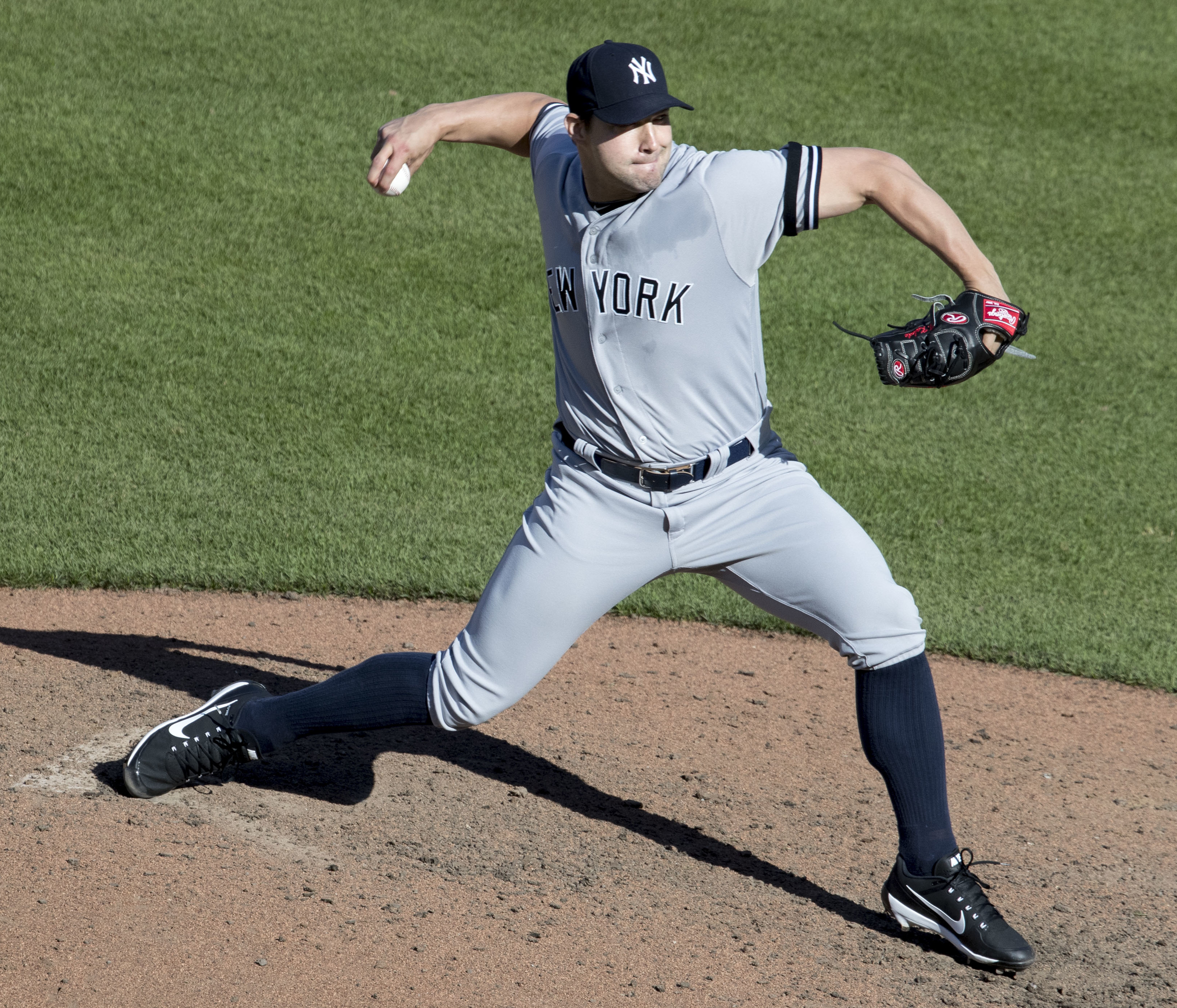
- Kahnle with the New York Yankees in 2017

Free agent
- Pitcher
- Born: August 7, 1989 (age 37); Latham, New York, U.S.
- Bats: Right Throws: Right

MLB debut
- April 3, 2014, for the Colorado Rockies

MLB statistics (through June 30, 2026)
- Win–loss record: 11–19
- Earned run average: 3.70
- Strikeouts: 507
- Stats at Baseball Reference

Teams
- Colorado Rockies (2014–2015); Chicago White Sox (2016–2017); New York Yankees (2017–2020); Los Angeles Dodgers (2022); New York Yankees (2023–2024); Detroit Tigers (2025); Boston Red Sox (2026)

Thomas Robert Kahnle (/ˈkeɪnliː/ KAYN-lee, born August 7, 1989) is an American professional baseball pitcher who is a free agent. He has previously played in Major League Baseball (MLB) for the Colorado Rockies, Chicago White Sox, New York Yankees, Los Angeles Dodgers, Detroit Tigers, and Boston Red Sox. The Yankees selected Kahnle in the fifth round of the 2010 MLB draft, and he made his MLB debut in 2014 with the Rockies.

== Amateur career ==
Kahnle played high school baseball at Shaker High School in Latham, New York, and college baseball at Lynn University in Boca Raton, Florida. As member of the Fighting Knights, Kahnle won the 2009 Division II College World Series and was named the Most Outstanding Player of the tournament.

In 2009, he played collegiate summer baseball with the Orleans Firebirds of the Cape Cod Baseball League, and returned to the league in 2010, splitting his time between the Bourne Braves and the Brewster Whitecaps.

== Professional career ==
=== New York Yankees (2010–2013) ===
The New York Yankees selected Kahnle in the fifth round of the 2010 Major League Baseball draft. He made his professional debut for the Staten Island Yankees in 2010. He appeared in 11 games and had a 0.56 earned run average (ERA) and 25 strikeouts over 16 innings pitched. He played for the Charleston RiverDogs in 2011, recording a 4.22 ERA and 112 strikeouts over 81 innings. He spent the 2012 season between the Tampa Yankees and Trenton Thunder. He had a 2.37 ERA with 74 strikeouts in 57 innings.

The Yankees invited Kahnle to spring training in 2013. He was an Eastern League All-Star in 2013 and finished the season with a 2.85 ERA and 74 strikeouts over 60 innings.

=== Colorado Rockies (2014–2015) ===
The Colorado Rockies selected Kahnle from the Yankees in the 2013 Rule 5 Draft. He opened the 2014 season on the Rockies' Opening Day roster, and made his major league debut on April 3. He would finish the season appearing in 54 games with a 4.19 ERA in 68-plus innings. The following season, Kahnle spent half the season in the minors, only appearing in 36 games for the Rockies while recording two saves. Kahnle was designated for assignment following the 2015 season.

=== Chicago White Sox (2016–2017) ===
The Rockies traded Kahnle to the Chicago White Sox for Yency Almonte on November 24, 2015. In his first season with the White Sox, Kahnle had a 2.63 ERA with 25 strikeouts and 21 walks in 27 1/3 innings pitched. He started the 2017 season pitching to a 2.50 ERA with 60 strikeouts and seven walks in 36 innings.

=== New York Yankees (2017–2020) ===
On July 18, 2017, the White Sox traded Kahnle, Todd Frazier, and David Robertson to the New York Yankees for Blake Rutherford, Tyler Clippard, Ian Clarkin, and Tito Polo. On August 24, 2017, Kahnle was ejected for the first time in his career after throwing a pitch behind Miguel Cabrera, leading up to Joe Girardi's ejection and an altercation between Austin Romine and Cabrera, triggering a bench-clearing brawl. On June 4, 2018, the Yankees optioned Kahnle to their Triple-A affiliate, the Scranton/Wilkes-Barre RailRiders, as Adam Warren was activated from the 10-day disabled list. Kahnle was recalled from the RailRiders on August 16 and recorded his first save of the 2018 season on August 21 against the Miami Marlins, replacing Aroldis Chapman in the top of the 12th inning after Chapman was removed due to knee pain.

In 2018, Kahnle posted a 6.56 ERA in 24 games for the New York Yankees.

In 2019, Kahnle was awarded the reliever of the month for the American League in the month of July 2019. He posted a 0.77 ERA in 12 games in July, striking out 17 batters while not surrendering a homer. He allowed just one run and five hits, walking two batters.

On July 31, 2020, Kahnle had an MRI that revealed a damaged ulnar collateral ligament of the elbow. He underwent Tommy John surgery the next week, which ended his 2020 season. On October 31, 2020, Kahnle was outrighted off of the 40-man roster and elected free agency.

=== Los Angeles Dodgers (2021–2022) ===
On December 29, 2020, Kahnle signed a two-year contract with the Los Angeles Dodgers. After missing the entire 2021 season while rehabbing his injuries, Kahnle made his Dodgers debut on May 1, 2022. However, after pitching in four games, he went on the injured list with right forearm inflammation in May. He didn't return until mid-September. In 13 games, he pitched in 12 2/3 innings, allowing four runs on five hits (two home runs) for a 2.84 ERA.

=== New York Yankees (2023–2024) ===
On December 21, 2022, Kahnle signed a two-year contract to return to the New York Yankees. Kahnle began the 2023 season on the injured list with biceps tendinitis, and was activated to make his season debut on June 1. He had a 1–3 record with a 2.66 ERA and two saves in 42 games for the Yankees before he was shut down in September with shoulder inflammation.

Kahnle made 42 appearances for the Yankees during the 2023 campaign, accumulating a 1–3 record and 2.66 ERA with 48 strikeouts and 2 saves across 40 2/3 innings pitched.

Kahnle began the 2024 season on the injured list due to shoulder inflammation. He was activated on May 22. Kahnle made 50 relief appearances for New York, registering a 2.11 ERA with 46 strikeouts across 42 2/3 innings of work. He recorded a save in the 2024 ALCS.

=== Detroit Tigers (2025) ===
On January 29, 2025, Kahnle signed a one-year, $7.75 million contract with the Detroit Tigers. He made 66 relief appearances for the Tigers, going 1–5 with a 4.43 ERA, 50 strikeouts, and nine saves across 63 innings pitched.

=== Boston Red Sox (2026) ===
On March 17, 2026, Kahnle signed a minor league contract with the Boston Red Sox. He made 18 appearances for the Triple-A Worcester Red Sox, logging an 0–1 record and 1.40 ERA with 21 strikeouts and five saves across 19 1/3 innings pitched. On June 4, the Red Sox selected Kahnle's contract, adding him to their active roster shortly after he triggered an opt-out clause. On July 1, he was designated for assignment. He declined an outright assignment to Worcester and elected free agency on July 4. On July 13, Kahnle re-signed with Boston on a minor league contract. He was released by the Red Sox on August 1.

== Pitch selection ==
Kahnle is mainly a two-pitch pitcher. He throws a four-seam fastball that touched 100 miles per hour (160 km/h) early in his career, but in recent seasons falls into the 92–96 miles per hour (148–154 km/h) range. He also throws a changeup anywhere from 84–90 miles per hour (135–145 km/h), with multiple grips to produce different movements. Since the 2019 season, he has thrown more changeups than fastballs. Notably, in the 2024 season, Kahnle had a stretch where he pitched 56 consecutive changeups. He throws a slider less than 1% of the time.

== Personal life ==
Kahnle and his wife, Veronica, a mental health counselor, began dating in 2011 and married in 2016.

== See also ==
- Rule 5 draft results
