= Tito Polo =

Colombian baseball player (born 1994)

Marineros de Carabobo – No. 1
- Outfielder / Infielder
- Born: August 23, 1994 (age 32); San Andrés, Colombia
- Bats: Right Throws: Right
- Stats at Baseball Reference
Medals
Men's baseball
Representing Colombia
Bolivarian Games
Gold medal – first place	2017 Santa Marta	Team
Gold medal – first place	2025 Lima-Ayacucho	Team

Tito Luis Polo Gonzalez (born August 23, 1994) is a Colombian professional baseball infielder who plays for the Marineros de Carabobo of the Venezuelan Major League. He has also played in the Mexican League and in Minor League Baseball, and represents Colombia in international competition.

== Career ==
=== Pittsburgh Pirates ===
Polo signed with the Pittsburgh Pirates as an international free agent in March 2012. He made his debut that same year with the DSL Pirates, and he spent the whole season there, slashing .280/.404/.394 with two home runs and 26 RBIs in 55 games. In 2013, he returned to the DSL Pirates and compiled a .275 batting average with two home runs, 16 RBIs, and 22 stolen bases in 45 games, and in 2014, he played for the GCL Pirates where he batted .291 with three home runs and 25 RBIs in 44 games. Polo spent 2015 with the West Virginia Power of the Single–A South Atlantic League, where he batted .236 with three home runs, 26 RBIs, and 46 stolen bases in 102 games. He began 2016 back with West Virginia and was later promoted to the Bradenton Marauders of the High–A Florida State League.

=== New York Yankees ===
The Pirates traded Polo, along with Stephen Tarpley, to the New York Yankees on August 30, 2016, as players to be named later for Iván Nova. New York assigned him to the Tampa Yankees of the FSL and he played in two games for them to finish the season. In 111 total games between West Virginia, Bradenton, and Tampa, he slashed .289/.359/.447 with 16 home runs, 66 RBI, and 37 stolen bases.

In 2017, Polo began the season with Tampa and was promoted to the Trenton Thunder of the Double–A Eastern League in July.

=== Chicago White Sox ===
On July 18, 2017, the Yankees traded Polo, Tyler Clippard, Blake Rutherford, and Ian Clarkin to the Chicago White Sox in exchange for David Robertson, Todd Frazier, and Tommy Kahnle. The White Sox assigned him to the Birmingham Barons of the Double–A Southern League. Polo posted a combined .301 batting average with five home runs, 44 RBI, 34 stolen bases, and an .805 OPS in 95 total games between Tampa, Trenton, and Birmingham.

Polo split the 2018 campaign between Birmingham and the rookie–level Arizona League White Sox. In 53 games between the two affiliates, he batted .254/.332/.384 with four home runs, 15 RBI, and 20 stolen bases. Polo elected free agency following the season on November 2, 2018.

=== Seattle Mariners ===
On November 28, 2018, Polo signed a minor league deal with the Seattle Mariners.

He began the 2019 season with the Tacoma Rainiers of the Triple-A Pacific Coast League. Polo was released by the Mariners organization on April 19, 2019, after being suspended 25 games by the Pacific Coast League for spiking El Paso Chihuahuas first baseman Alex Dickerson during a game on April 17. Despite this Polo claimed it was an accident caused by running with his head down thus not allowing him to see Dickerson's foot.

=== Acereros de Monclova ===
On June 6, 2019, Polo signed with the Acereros de Monclova of the Mexican League.

=== Rieleros de Aguascalientes ===
On June 25, 2019, Polo was traded to the Rieleros de Aguascalientes. In 8 games, he went 9–for–32 (.281) with one home run and five RBI. On July 25, Polo was released by Aguascalientes. He did not play in a game in 2020 after the Mexican League season was cancelled as a result of the COVID-19 pandemic. After the 2020 season, he played for Colombia in the 2021 Caribbean Series.

=== Generales de Durango ===
On April 17, 2021, Polo signed with the Generales de Durango. He batted a team-high .375/.451/.631 with 5 home runs and 16 RBI in 45 games. He became a free agent following the season.

=== Tigres de Quintana Roo ===
On January 16, 2022, Polo signed with the Tigres de Quintana Roo. He appeared in 79 games for Quintana Roo, slashing .295/.389/.531 with 12 home runs, 36 RBI, and 35 stolen bases.

=== Bravos de León ===
On December 1, 2022, Polo signed a minor league contract with the Washington Nationals. Polo was released by the Nationals organization on March 13, 2023.

On June 2, 2023, Polo signed with the Bravos de León of the Mexican League. He played in eight games for León in 2023, hitting .419/.487/.742 with two home runs and six RBI. In 2024, Polo played in 12 games for the team, batting .233/.306/.326 with three RBI and two stolen bases. He was released by the Bravos on June 8, 2024.

=== El Águila de Veracruz ===
On June 19, 2024, Polo signed with El Águila de Veracruz of the Mexican League. In 28 appearances for the team, he slashed .419/.473/.627 with three home runs, 17 RBI, and five stolen bases. Polo was released by Veracruz on January 20, 2025.

== International career ==
Polo was selected to the roster for the Colombia national baseball team at the 2015 Pan American Games and 2017 World Baseball Classic.

In the 2017 WBC, he played in Colombia's first WBC victory. He was ejected along with Team Colombia's first baseman, Reynaldo Rodriguez and Bench Coach, Edgar Renteria for arguing a call.
