= Taiga Hirasawa =

Japanese baseball player (born 1997)

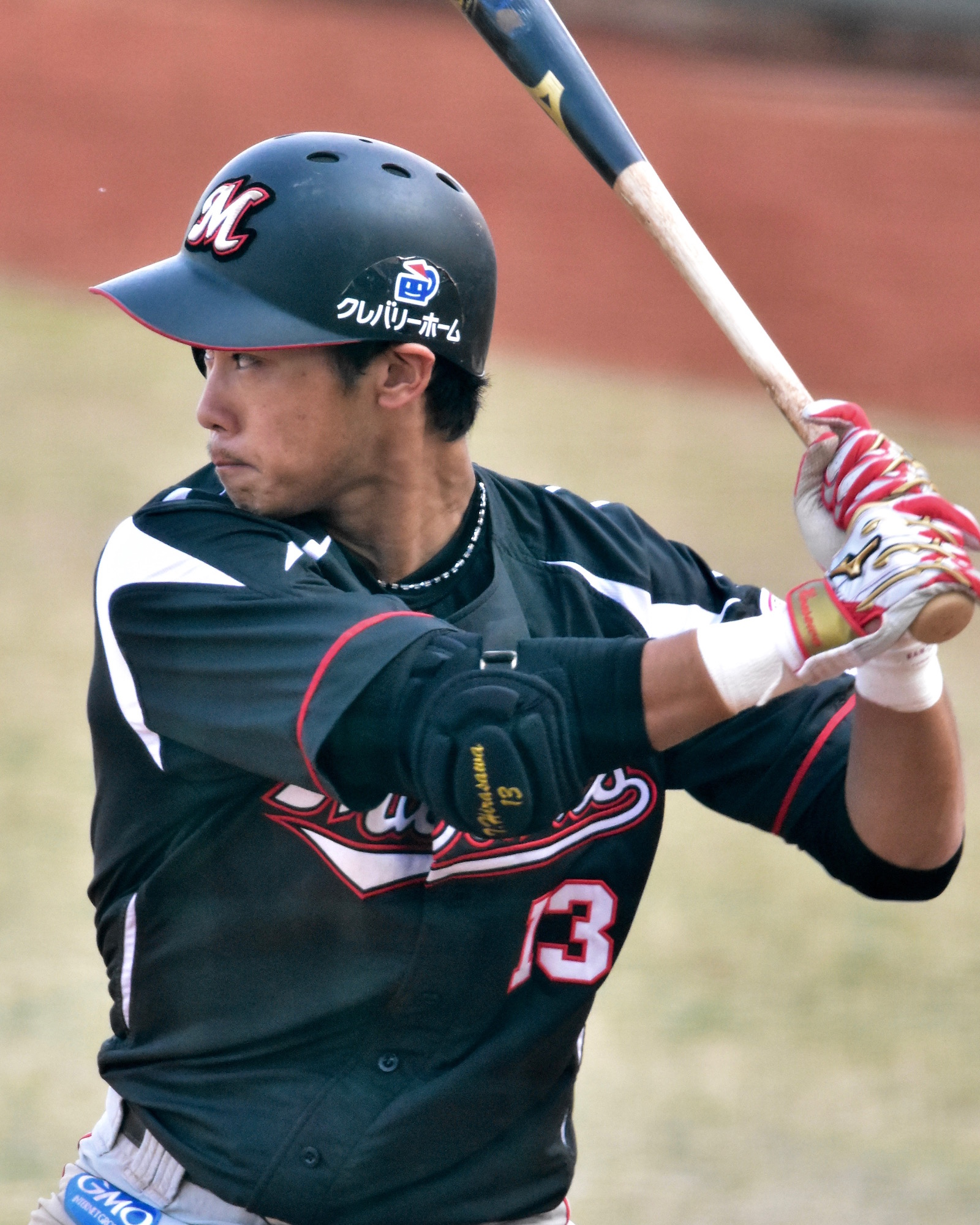

Saitama Seibu Lions – No. 39
- Infielder
- Born: December 24, 1997 (age 28); Tagajō, Miyagi, Japan
- Bats: Left Throws: Right

NPB debut
- May 11, 2016, for the Chiba Lotte Marines

NPB statistics (through 2024 season)
- Batting average: .190
- Home runs: 10
- Runs batted in: 57
- Stats at Baseball Reference

Teams
- Chiba Lotte Marines (2016–2024); Saitama Seibu Lions (2025–present)
Medals
Men's baseball
Representing Japan
U-18 Baseball World Cup
Silver medal – second place	2015 Osaka	Team

Taiga Hirasawa (平沢 大河, Hirasawa Taiga; born December 24, 1997), nicknamed "T-Ga", is a Japanese professional baseball infielder for the Saitama Seibu Lions of Nippon Professional Baseball (NPB). He has previously played in NPB for the Chiba Lotte Marines.

== Career ==
He was the first draft pick for the Marines at the 2015 NPB draft.

Hirasawa signed with the Auckland Tuatara of the Australian Baseball League to play the first 5 weeks of the 2018/19 ABL season.
