= Kevin Gowdy =

American baseball player (born 1997)

- Pitcher
- Born: November 16, 1997 (age 29); Santa Barbara, California, U.S.
- Bats: Right Throws: Right
- Stats at Baseball Reference
Medals
Men's baseball
Representing United States
U-18 Baseball World Cup
Gold medal – first place	2015 Osaka	Team

Kevin R. Gowdy (born November 16, 1997) is an American former professional baseball pitcher. He attended Santa Barbara High School in Santa Barbara, California. Gowdy was selected by the Philadelphia Phillies in the second round of the 2016 MLB draft.

== Amateur career ==
Gowdy was born on November 16, 1997, in Santa Barbara, California. Aside from baseball, he earned a black belt in taekwondo and played soccer, basketball, and flag football. Gowdy began taking pitching lessons at age eight and decided to focus on the sport as a teenager.

Gowdy attended Santa Barbara High School in his hometown, where he made the varsity baseball team as a sophomore. That year, he had a 0–2 win-loss record and 1.27 earned run average (ERA) in 23 innings pitched. As a junior, Gowdy improved to 3–0 with a 0.27 ERA and 42 strikeouts in 26 innings pitched, signing a national letter of intent to play college baseball at the University of California, Los Angeles after leading his team to the CIF Southern Section Division II playoffs for the second straight year.

Gowdy earned all-tournament honors at both the 2014 Perfect Game (PG) WWBA World Championship and the Baseball America 2015 Area Code Games. He also played in the 2015 PG All-American Classic and was named a 2015 PG USA first-team Underclass All-American. In 2016, Gowdy was ranked No. 11 in the 2016 PG USA Top 500 High School Prospects.

== Professional career ==
=== Philadelphia Phillies ===
Gowdy was considered a top prospect for the 2016 MLB draft; he was selected in the second round (42nd overall) by the Philadelphia Phillies. He bypassed a college career and signed with the Phillies for $3.5 million. Gowdy was assigned to the Gulf Coast League Phillies, where he spent the remainder of the season, posting a 4.00 ERA in nine innings pitched. He did not report to a minor league club to begin the 2017 season and instead underwent Tommy John surgery in August, sidelining him for the 2018 season as well. He returned to pitch in 2019 with the Lakewood BlueClaws, going 0–6 with a 4.68 ERA in 24 games (16 starts), striking out 53 batters over 77 innings. He did not play in 2020 due to the cancellation of the Minor League Baseball season because of the COVID-19 pandemic. Gowdy opened the 2021 season with the Jersey Shore BlueClaws of the High-A East, going 4–5 with a 4.42 ERA and 63 strikeouts over 61 innings.

=== Texas Rangers ===
On July 30, 2021, Gowdy, Spencer Howard, and Josh Gessner were traded to the Texas Rangers in exchange for Hans Crouse, Kyle Gibson, and Ian Kennedy. He finished out the 2021 season with the Hickory Crawdads of the High-A East, going 2–1 with a 3.71 ERA and 26 strikeouts over 29 innings. Gowdy opened the 2022 season back with Hickory. However, he instead spent the season with the Double-A Frisco RoughRiders, posting a 2-3 record and 9.90 ERA with 33 strikeouts across 40 innings pitched. Gowdy elected free agency following the season on November 10, 2022.

After spending most of his early career as a starter, Gowdy was converted to a reliever during his 2022 stint with Frisco.

=== Los Angeles Dodgers ===
Gowdy signed a minor league contract with the Los Angeles Dodgers on January 23, 2023. The Dodgers assigned him to the Double–A Tulsa Drillers, where he appeared in 31 games with a 4.93 ERA and 41 strikeouts. He was assigned to the Triple–A Oklahoma City Baseball Club for the 2024 season, where he made 42 appearances and allowed 25 earned runs in 51 1/3 innings for a 4.38 ERA. Gowdy elected free agency following the season on November 4, 2024.

=== Toronto Blue Jays ===
On December 3, 2024, Gowdy signed a minor league contract with the Toronto Blue Jays, which included an invite to Blue Jays spring training. He was assigned to the Triple-A Buffalo Bisons for the 2025 season. On June 13, 2025, Gowdy appeared in relief of Max Scherzer, who was on rehab assignment, against the Columbus Clippers. In 33 appearances, he posted a 3-2 record with a 5.25 ERA and 32 strikeouts in 36 innings pitched. Gowdy was released by the Blue Jays organization on July 27.

=== Diablos Rojos del México ===
On July 28, 2025, Gowdy signed with the Diablos Rojos del México of the Mexican League. He made three appearances for México, posting a 1–0 record and 4.50 ERA with three strikeouts over four innings of relief. Gowdy helped the team win the Serie del Rey.

=== New York Mets ===
On March 16, 2026, Gowdy signed a minor league contract with the New York Mets. He was assigned to the Double-A Binghamton Rumble Ponies to begin the regular season. In 10 relief appearances, Gowdy posted a 10.61 ERA, striking out 12 and walking nine batters across 9 1/3 innings. He was released by the Mets organization on May 11.

=== Diablos Rojos del México (second stint) ===
On May 16, 2026, Gowdy signed with the Diablos Rojos del México of the Mexican League. In four relief appearances, he posted a 3.60 ERA and struck out five batters over five innings pitched. On May 31, Gowdy was released by the Diablos.

On October 21, 2026, Gowdy announced he was searching for collegiate punting opportunities while he pursues a degree.

== International career ==
Gowdy won a gold medal with the United States at the 2015 U-18 Baseball World Cup in Japan. He earned a win against Mexico, and pitched two scoreless innings to lead the United States to a comeback win over Cuba in the semifinal.
