= Reggie Lawson =

American baseball player (born 1997)

- Pitcher
- Born: August 2, 1997 (age 29); Victorville, California, U.S.
- Bats: Right Throws: Right
- Stats at Baseball Reference
Medals
Men's baseball
Representing United States
U-18 Baseball World Cup
Gold medal – first place	2015 Osaka	Team

Reginald Jefferson Lawson (born August 2, 1997) is an American former professional baseball pitcher.

== Amateur career ==
Lawson attended Victor Valley High School in Victorville, California. Lawson played in the 2015 Perfect Game All-American Classic. Lawson was a member of Team USA when they won Gold at the 2015 WBSC U-18 Baseball World Cup. He had committed to play college baseball at Arizona State University. Lawson was drafted by the San Diego Padres, with the 71st overall selection, in the Compensation Round B of the 2016 MLB draft. He signed with the Padres for a $1.9 million signing bonus.

== Professional career ==
Lawson made his professional debut in 2016 with the AZL Padres of the Rookie-level Arizona League, going 0–0 with an 8.31 ERA and 7 strikeouts over 8 2/3 innings. He spent the 2017 season with the Fort Wayne TinCaps of the Single–A Midwest League, going 4–6 with a 5.30 ERA and 89 strikeouts over 73 innings. Lawson spent the 2018 season with the Lake Elsinore Storm of the High–A California League, going 8–5 with a 4.69 ERA and 117 strikeouts over 117 innings. In 2019, Lawson played for the Amarillo Sod Poodles of the Double-A Texas League, going 3–1 with a 5.20 ERA and 36 strikeouts over 27 2/3 innings. He appeared in just six games due to an elbow injury. Following the 2019 season, Lawson played for the Peoria Javelinas of the Arizona Fall League.

Lawson did not play in a game in 2020 due to the cancellation of the minor league season because of the COVID-19 pandemic. He additionally underwent Tommy John surgery in March of the same year. On November 20, 2020, the Padres added Lawson to their 40-man roster in order to protect him from the Rule 5 draft.

Lawson missed a large portion of the 2021 season recovering from Tommy John, and pitched only 6 2/3 minor league innings, allowing 10 runs. He was out righted off of the 40-man roster following the season on November 19, 2021. He began the 2022 season with the Double–A San Antonio Missions, compiling a 4–6 record and 5.63 ERA with 55 strikeouts across 17 starts. Lawson announced his retirement from professional baseball on August 13, 2022.

On November 14, 2023, Lawson came out of retirement and re–joined the Padres organization. He returned to Double-A San Antonio for the 2024 season, but struggled to an 8.10 ERA with 14 strikeouts in 13 1/3 innings pitched across 13 relief outings. Lawson elected free agency following the season on November 4, 2024.
