= Yu Jae-yu =

South Korean baseball player

- Pitcher
- Born: 3 March 1997 (age 29); Incheon, South Korea
- Batted: Right Threw: Right

KBO debut
- July 3, 2016, for the LG Twins

Last KBO appearance
- October 22, 2021, for the Doosan Bears

KBO statistics
- Win–loss record: 0–2
- Earned run average: 8.86
- Strikeouts: 10
- Stats at Baseball Reference

Teams
- LG Twins (2016–2017); Doosan Bears (2018, 2021)
Medals
Men's baseball
Representing South Korea
U-18 Baseball World Cup
Bronze medal – third place	2015 Osaka	Team

Yu Jae-yu (유재유; born 3 March 1997) is a South Korean professional baseball pitcher who played for the Doosan Bears of the KBO League. His cousin Go Woo-suk pitches for the LG Twins.

== Career records ==
Year	Team	ERA	G	CG	SHO	W	L	SV	HLD	WPCT	PA	IP	H	HR	BB	HBP	K	R	ER
2016	LG Twins	13.50	7	0	0	0	1	0	0	0.000	36	6.2	10	2	7	0	3	10	10
2017	LG Twins	3.60	3	0	0	0	0	0	0	-	25	5	6	0	4	0	1	2	2
2018	Doosan Bears	7.11	5	0	0	0	1	0	0	0.000	34	6.3	11	1	3	3	5	5	5
