= Todd Frazier =

American baseball player (born 1986)

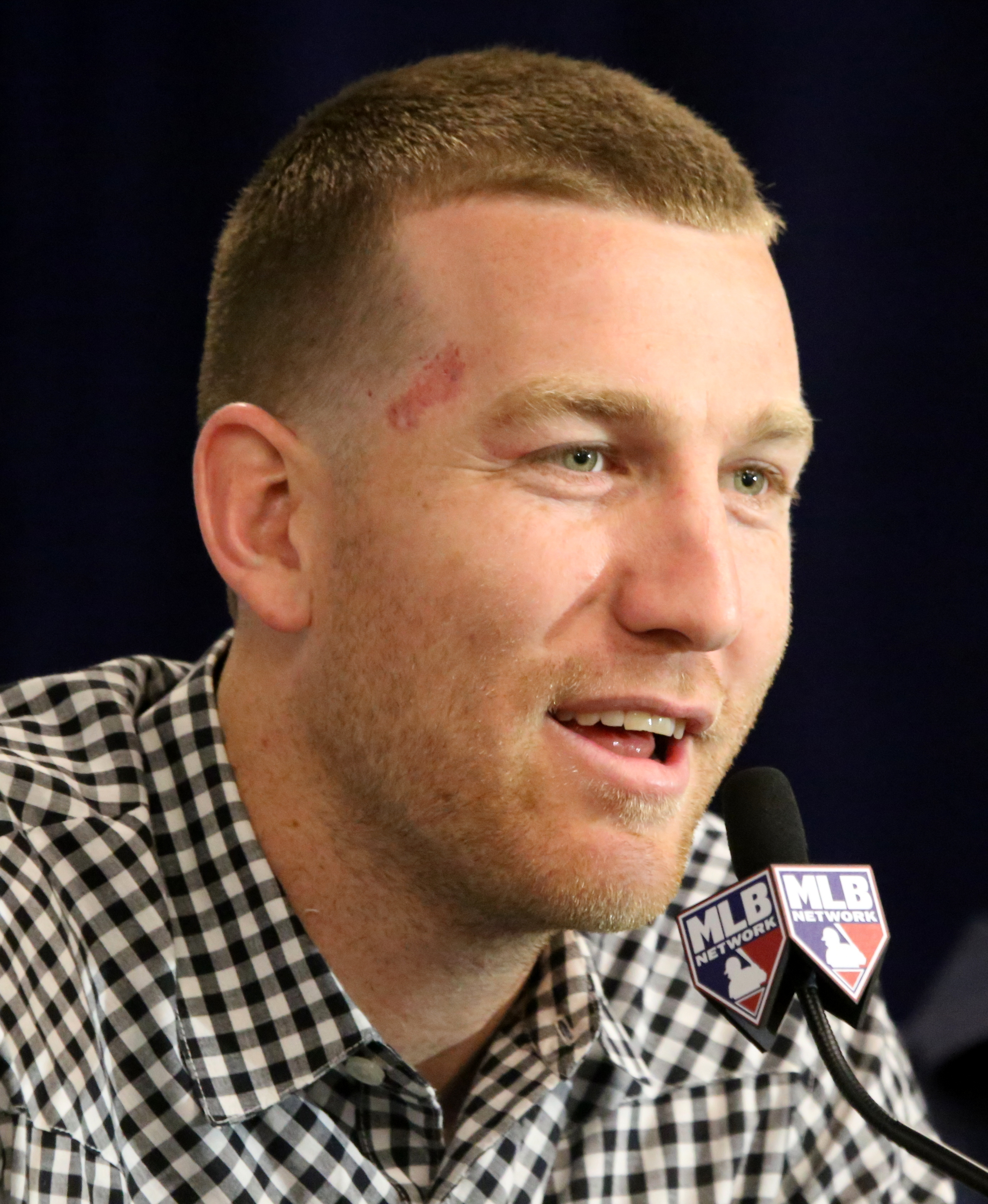
- Frazier in 2016
- Third baseman
- Born: February 12, 1986 (age 40); Point Pleasant, New Jersey, U.S.
- Batted: Right Threw: Right

MLB debut
- May 23, 2011, for the Cincinnati Reds

Last MLB appearance
- May 9, 2021, for the Pittsburgh Pirates

MLB statistics
- Batting average: .241
- Home runs: 218
- Runs batted in: 640
- Stats at Baseball Reference

Teams
- Cincinnati Reds (2011–2015); Chicago White Sox (2016–2017); New York Yankees (2017); New York Mets (2018–2019); Texas Rangers (2020); New York Mets (2020); Pittsburgh Pirates (2021)

Career highlights and awards
- 2× All-Star (2014, 2015)
Medals
Men's baseball
Representing United States
Olympic Games
Silver medal – second place	2020 Tokyo	Team
World University Championship
Gold medal – first place	2006 Havana	Team

Todd Brian Frazier OLY (born February 12, 1986), nicknamed "the Toddfather", is an American former professional baseball third baseman. He played in Major League Baseball (MLB) for the Cincinnati Reds, Chicago White Sox, New York Yankees, Texas Rangers, New York Mets, and Pittsburgh Pirates from 2011 to 2021. Frazier was an MLB All-Star in 2014 and 2015.

== Amateur career ==
Todd Frazier was born in Point Pleasant, New Jersey, as the youngest of three boys and of partial Scottish ancestry from his father's side. He grew up in Toms River, New Jersey.

Frazier was a member of the 1996 Junior Pee-Wee National Champions in football.

=== 1998 Little League World Series ===
At the age of 12 and measuring 5 feet 2 inches (1.57 m) and 104 pounds (47 kg), Frazier was a star on the Toms River East American Little League All-Star team that won the New Jersey state championship and then the US East regional championship, to advance to the 1998 Little League World Series in Williamsport, Pennsylvania. Dubbed the "Beasts of the East" for their skill, power and lucky-charm, stuffed gorilla, the team went undefeated in the tournament, and Frazier saved his best performance for the world championship game against the Far East and International-champion Kashima Little League from Kashima, Ibaraki, Japan, on August 29 at Howard J. Lamade Stadium. Beginning the game at shortstop, not only did he go 4–4 with a leadoff home run, but he was also the winning pitcher and recorded the game-winning strikeout that sealed a 12–9 Toms River win and the world championship – the first American Little League world championship since 1993.

To celebrate their world championship, the Toms River team was invited by the New York Yankees to Yankee Stadium on September 1, 1998, as the Yankees faced the Oakland Athletics, and each Toms River player was introduced publicly to the crowd and invited to stand next to his Yankee position counterpart during the national anthem, which meant that Frazier, as shortstop, was standing next to New Jersey–born Derek Jeter.

=== High school and college ===
Frazier attended Toms River High School South and played for the school's baseball team. The Colorado Rockies selected Frazier in the 37th round, with the 1,100th overall pick, of the 2004 MLB draft, but he did not sign.

the 37th round of the 2004 MLB draft, but he did not sign.

Frazier attended Rutgers University and played college baseball for the Rutgers Scarlet Knights. In 2005 and 2006, he played collegiate summer baseball for the Chatham Anglers of the Cape Cod Baseball League. In 2007, he started all 63 games for Rutgers, posting a .377 batting average, a .502 on-base percentage, and a .757 slugging percentage. He won Big East player of the year in 2007 and was named a Rivals.com All-American. Frazier finished in the top six all-time in every major single-season offensive category at Rutgers except triples. He set records for home runs, runs scored (87), walks (62), doubles (24) and total bases (187). He also finished second in slugging percentage (.757), second in at-bats (247), tied for third in RBI (65), fifth in hits (93) and tied for sixth in stolen bases (25). He is one of 3 Rutgers players picked in the 1st round of the MLB draft since 1966. Frazier joined Bud White (1966) and Bobby Brownlie (2002) when he was selected with the 34th overall pick in the first round of the 2007 MLB draft. Since then, Rutgers only has had two players picked in the top 10 rounds, including fourth-rounder Patrick Kivlehan (2013), who played with the Cincinnati Reds in 2017.

== Professional career ==
=== Cincinnati Reds ===
The Cincinnati Reds selected Frazier with the 34th overall selection of the 2007 Major League Baseball draft. On July 11, 2007, Frazier made his professional debut as a designated hitter for the Billings Mustangs—the Reds' rookie-advanced farm team in the Pioneer League—going 2-for-4 with two singles, an RBI and a run scored. Frazier finished the 2007 season with the Dayton Dragons.

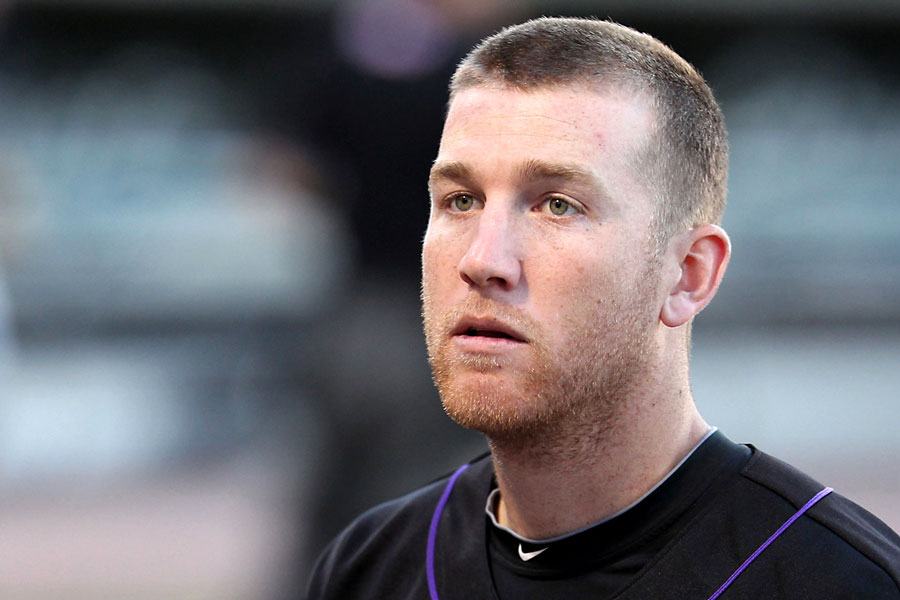
Frazier with the Louisville Bats in 2010

Frazier played multiple positions for the Louisville Bats, the Reds' AAA team in the International League. He also spent the 2010 preseason as a non-roster invitee to the Reds' training camp. After the 2010 season, he was added to the Reds' 40-man roster.

On May 23, 2011, Frazier and Matt Maloney were called up to the majors, with Edinson Vólquez and Jordan Smith optioned to Louisville. Frazier struck out in his first major league plate appearance facing Michael Stutes while pinch-hitting for Maloney. On May 24, Frazier was optioned back to Louisville to add an extra relief pitcher, Carlos Fisher.

On July 31, 2011, Frazier hit his first career home run, a solo shot off of Barry Zito's 1–1 hanging curveball. On May 16, 2012, Frazier hit two home runs against the New York Mets. On May 23, he hit a walk-off home run in the bottom of the ninth against the Atlanta Braves.

On May 27, Frazier homered off of the Colorado Rockies' Jamie Moyer in a 7–5 Reds' win. The home run was unusual because Frazier's bat slipped out of his hands as he was swinging. The same day, he had saved the life of a man choking on a piece of steak by administering the Heimlich maneuver. Of the latter experience, he said, "I gave two pumps and it came out . . . It was pretty surreal. I have never done that before."

On November 5, 2012, Frazier was named the Players Choice Awards National League Outstanding Rookie by the MLB Players Association. On April 18, 2013, Frazier hit a homer for Reds' honorary bat boy Teddy Kremer, an adult with Down syndrome.

On July 6, 2014, Frazier was named a National League All-Star for the first time in his career, along with teammates Johnny Cueto, Aroldis Chapman and Devin Mesoraco and later Alfredo Simón. On July 8, he was selected to participate in the Home Run Derby. In the Derby, where Frazier's brother Charlie served as his pitcher, he won the National League bracket and represented the NL in the final, where he lost to defending champ Yoenis Céspedes.

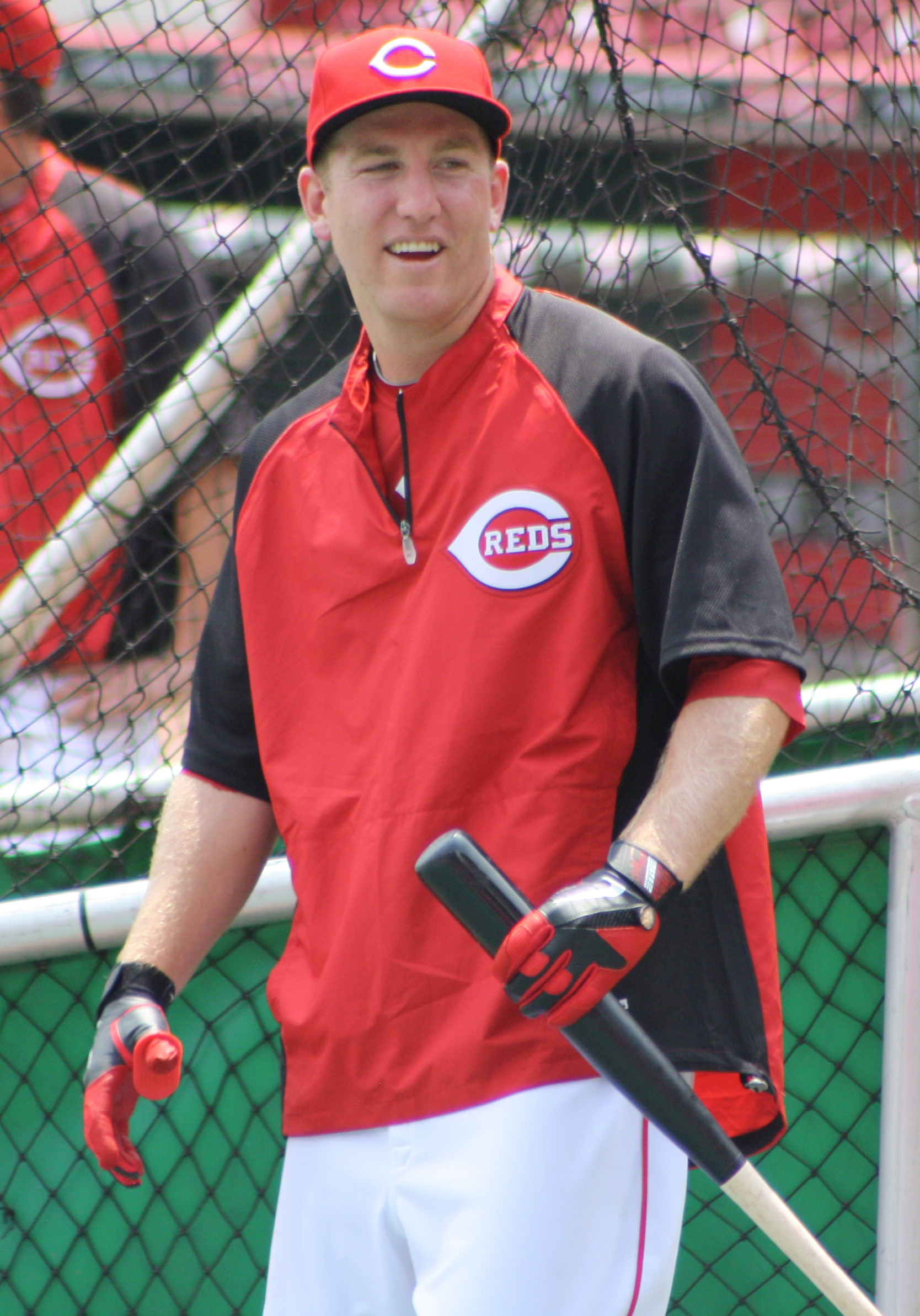
Frazier with the Cincinnati Reds in 2012

On February 8, 2015, Frazier and the Reds reached an agreement on a two-year, $12 million contract. The deal paid Frazier $4.5 million in 2015, including a signing bonus, and $7.5 million in 2016.

On April 21, Frazier hit his first career grand slam, against the Milwaukee Brewers in a 16–10 victory.

On May 12, the Reds announced that Frazier would serve as the 2015 MLB All-Star Game spokesperson.

On July 13, Frazier won the 2015 MLB Home Run Derby on his home field in Cincinnati. Frazier beat the 2012 Derby champion Prince Fielder in the first round and defeated Toronto Blue Jays third baseman Josh Donaldson in the second round and then beat the Los Angeles Dodgers' rookie centerfielder Joc Pederson in the final round. He became the first hometown participant to win the derby since Ryne Sandberg won as a member of the Chicago Cubs in 1990.

=== Chicago White Sox ===
On December 16, 2015, Frazier was traded to the Chicago White Sox as part of a three team trade that sent Scott Schebler, José Peraza, and Brandon Dixon to the Cincinnati Reds and Frankie Montas, Micah Johnson, and Trayce Thompson to the Los Angeles Dodgers.

On May 11, 2016, Frazier made an astounding play in the seats behind the third base line. In recoil, he suffered an apparent facial injury and left the game. The injury wasn't serious; however it required 5 stitches by the lower lip.

On July 11, Frazier placed second in the 2016 MLB Home Run Derby at Petco Park in San Diego, losing to Giancarlo Stanton 20–13 in the final round. Frazier's total of 42 home runs, and Stanton's total of 61 home runs in the 2016 Derby make them the top two hitters of all time in a single Derby.

In his only full season in Chicago, Frazier finished with career highs in home runs, runs batted in and walks despite hitting a career low .225 in 158 games. In his second season through 81 games, Frazier hit 16 home runs with 44 RBIs while batting .207. For the season, he had the lowest batting average on balls in play (.236) of all major league players, and had the highest fly ball percentage (48.7%) and the lowest line drive percentage (15.7%) of all major league hitters. Frazier signed a one-year, $12-million contract with the White Sox on January 13, 2017.

=== New York Yankees ===
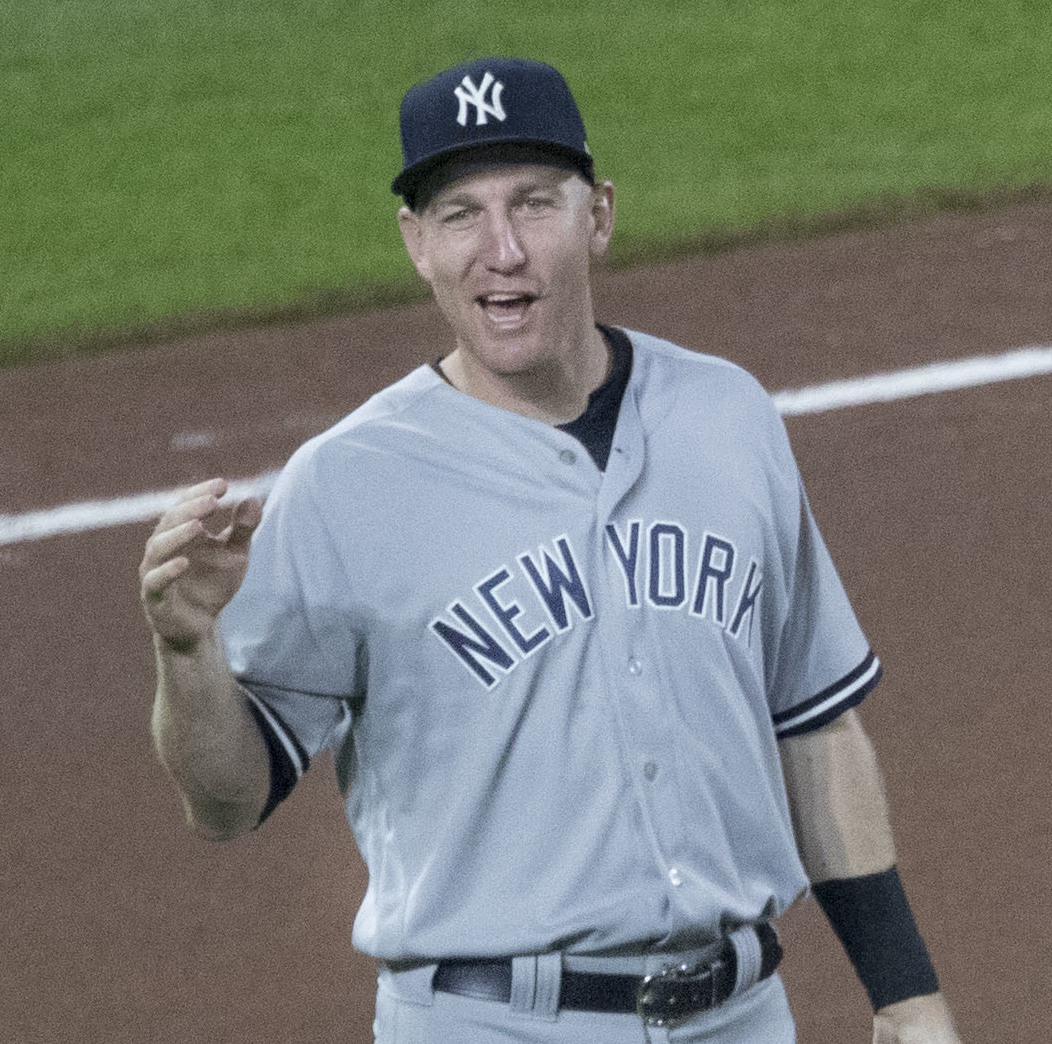
Frazier with the New York Yankees in 2017

On July 18, 2017, the White Sox traded Frazier, Tommy Kahnle, and David Robertson to the New York Yankees for Blake Rutherford, Tyler Clippard, Ian Clarkin, and Tito Polo. Upon Frazier's arrival in New York, he changed his jersey number from No. 21 to No. 29, as No. 21 was unofficially retired by the Yankees for outfielder Paul O'Neill (the Yankees retired O'Neill's number in 2022). Frazier had worn No. 21 throughout his entire career in honor of O'Neill, as he had grown up a Yankees fan in New Jersey. Frazier had stated that he hoped to speak to O'Neill to gain permission to wear the number; however, clubhouse manager Rob Cucuzza told Frazier that it would not happen.

On July 25, 2017, against his former team, the Cincinnati Reds, Frazier hit into a run-scoring triple play in his first home at-bat as a Yankee. He hit his first home run as a Yankee on July 26 against the Reds. Frazier finished the 2017 season batting .213 with 26 home runs and 77 RBI with the White Sox and Yankees. With the Yankees, Frazier developed into a fan favorite and played a key role in the clubhouse as the team's emotional leader during their postseason run.

=== New York Mets ===
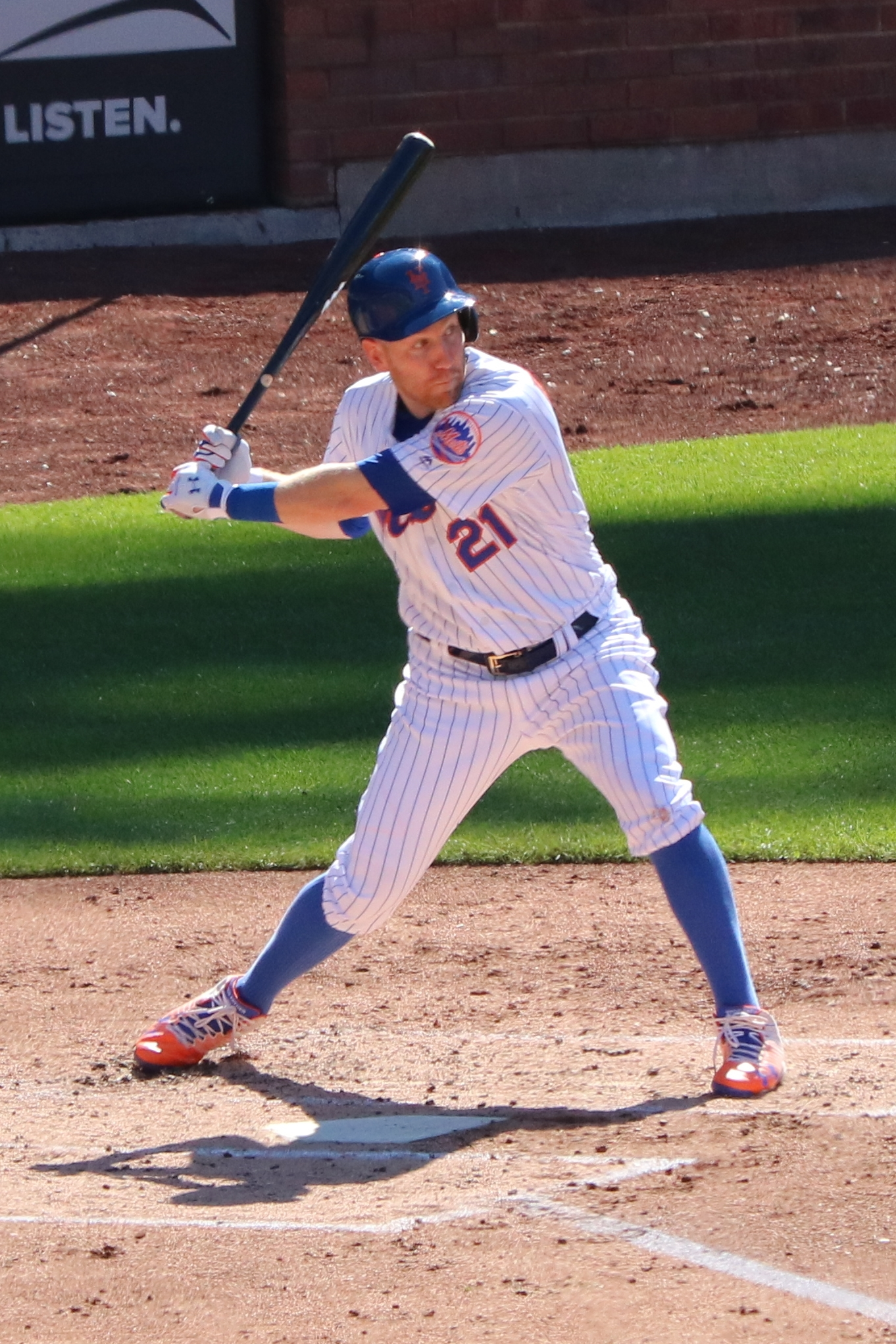
Frazier with the Mets in 2018

On February 7, 2018, Frazier signed a two-year, $16 million contract with the New York Mets.

On May 3, Frazier claimed that umpires were doing a worse job of calling balls and strikes in 2018 than in previous seasons and asked for a meeting with MLB commissioner Rob Manfred to discuss his frustration. "It's rubbing everybody the wrong way," Frazier said. "You have to be better than that." MLB said it had no comment on Frazier's remarks.

The Mets placed Frazier on the disabled list on May 8 after he suffered the first hamstring injury of his career. Frazier was activated from the DL on June 5 after appearing in three rehab games with the Triple-A Las Vegas 51s. He was placed on the disabled list on July 9 for the second time in the season with a rib cage injury. Frazier finished the season batting .213 for the second straight season with 18 home runs and 59 RBI.

Frazier was placed on the injured list to begin the 2019 season with a left oblique strain. On August 9, 2019, during a game against the Washington Nationals, Frazier hit a game-tying, three-run home run in the bottom of the 9th inning off of pitcher Sean Doolittle. The Mets went on to win the game 7–6, from a walk-off single by Michael Conforto.

On September 6, Frazier recorded his 1,000th career hit, a third inning single off Zach Eflin of the Philadelphia Phillies at Citi Field. He finished the season batting .251/.329/.443 with 21 home runs and 67 RBI.

=== Texas Rangers ===
On January 15, 2020, Frazier signed a one-year deal with the Texas Rangers. In 31 games for Texas in 2020, Frazier slashed .241/.322/.380 with 2 home runs and 7 RBI in 108 at-bats.

=== New York Mets (second stint) ===
On August 31, 2020, the Rangers traded Frazier to the Mets in exchange for a player to be named later, who was, on December 18, named Ryder Ryan. On September 18, 2020, he made his MLB pitching debut. He threw a scoreless inning against the Atlanta Braves in a 15–2 loss. Offensively, Frazier finished the 2020 season batting .236/.302/.382 with 4 home runs and 12 RBIs over 45 games between the Rangers and the Mets.

On October 28, 2020, the Mets declined Frazier's option for the 2021 season, making him a free agent.

=== Pittsburgh Pirates ===
On February 19, 2021, Frazier signed a minor league contract with the Pittsburgh Pirates organization that included an invitation to spring training. On March 26, Frazier opted out of his minor league contract and became a free agent. On March 30, Frazier re-signed with the Pirates on a new minor league deal. On April 22, Frazier was selected to the active roster. Frazier was designated for assignment on May 10 after hitting only .086/.200/.114 in 40 plate appearances. On May 13, Frazier was outrighted to Triple-A, but rejected the assignment and elected free agency.

=== Sussex County Miners ===
On June 9, 2021, Frazier signed with the Sussex County Miners of the Frontier League, to help prepare for the 2020 Summer Olympics (contested in 2021). He played in 6 games, going 6-for-21 with one home run and 6 RBI.

On April 5, 2022, Frazier announced his retirement from professional baseball.

== International career ==
In May 2021, Frazier played for the United States national baseball team during qualifying for baseball at the 2020 Summer Olympics. After the team qualified, he was named to the Olympics roster on July 2. The team went on to win silver, losing to host Japan in the gold-medal game.

== Personal life ==
On December 14, 2012, Frazier married his longtime girlfriend Jackie Verdon, a former Rutgers gymnast, who is also a New Jersey native. The couple have three children. The family resides in Toms River, where his name graces the Little League field called Frazier Field House.

The Frazier family has Scottish ancestry. Todd has two older brothers who also played professional baseball. Jeff Frazier played in nine major league games in 2010 for the Detroit Tigers and spent a total of nine seasons with the Tigers, Seattle Mariners, Washington Nationals and the Chicago Cubs organizations without returning to the Major Leagues. Charlie Frazier played for six seasons in the Florida Marlins organization.

Frazier grew up a New York Yankees fan in Toms River, New Jersey.

Frazier is a fan of fellow New Jerseyan Frank Sinatra, and often chose Sinatra's songs to play when he walked up to the batter's box before an at-bat.

== See also ==
- List of Olympic medalists in baseball
