= Bryce Eldridge =

American baseball player (born 2004)

San Francisco Giants – No. 8
- Designated hitter / First baseman
- Born: October 20, 2004 (age 21); Vienna, Virginia, U.S.
- Bats: Left Throws: Right

MLB debut
- September 15, 2025, for the San Francisco Giants

MLB statistics (through 2026 season)
- Batting average: .258
- Home runs: 17
- Runs batted in: 61
- Stats at Baseball Reference

Teams
- San Francisco Giants (2025–present)
Medals
Men's baseball
Representing United States
U-18 Baseball World Cup
Gold medal – first place	2022 Sarasota-Bradenton	Team

Bryson Edward Eldridge (born October 20, 2004) is an American professional baseball designated hitter and first baseman for the San Francisco Giants of Major League Baseball (MLB). He made his MLB debut in 2025.

== Early life ==
Bryce Edward Eldridge was born on October 20, 2004, in Fairfax, Virginia. Eldridge grew up in Vienna, Virginia and attended James Madison High School. He played for the United States national under-18 team in the 2022 U-18 Baseball World Cup and was named the tournament's MVP after batting .316 with three home runs and 13 RBI. He also won USA Baseball's Richard W. "Dick" Case Award.

In 2023, Eldridge was named the Virginia Gatorade Baseball Player of the Year after going 11–0 with a 1.30 ERA and 88 strikeouts over 53 2/3 innings pitched and batting .422 with nine home runs and 23 RBIs. He committed to play college baseball at the University of Alabama.

== Professional career ==
=== Draft and minor leagues ===
The San Francisco Giants selected Eldridge in the first round, with the 16th pick, in the 2023 Major League Baseball draft. He was considered a top prospect and the draft's best two-way prospect. He signed with the Giants on July 17, 2023, for an under-slot deal of $4 million. He spent his first professional season with the rookie-level Arizona Complex League Giants and Single-A San Jose Giants. In 31 total games, Eldridge hit .294/.400/.505 with six home runs and 18 RBI.

Prior to the 2024 season, Eldridge announced that he would be a first baseman and stop pitching. Late in the season, he was promoted to the Double-A Richmond Flying Squirrels. Across minor league levels ranging from Single-A to Triple-A, Eldridge hit .292 with 23 home runs in 116 games. After the season, he played for the Scottsdale Scorpions in the Arizona Fall League.

Eldridge began the 2025 season on the Double-A injured list with a wrist injury, and returned to the Triple-A Sacramento River Cats in early June.

=== San Francisco Giants (2025–present) ===
On September 15, 2025, Eldridge was selected to the 40-man roster and promoted to the major leagues for the first time. He made his MLB debut that night against the Arizona Diamondbacks, starting as the designated hitter; he went 0-for-3 in a 1–7 loss. Eldridge became the third player in franchise history to debut with the Giants while age 20, after Matt Cain and Madison Bumgarner. On September 20, Eldridge collected his first Major League hit at Dodger Stadium off of Tyler Glasnow. In 10 appearances for San Francisco, he went 3-for-28 (.107) with four RBI and seven walks. On October 1, it was announced that Eldridge would require surgery to remove a bone spur from his left wrist.

Eldridge was optioned to Triple-A Sacramento to begin the 2026 season. He was recalled to the major leagues on May 4, 2026, alongside Jesús Rodríguez. On May 9, Eldridge hit his first career home run off of Braxton Ashcraft of the Pittsburgh Pirates. Just over a month later on June 10, Eldridge came to the plate in the ninth inning with the bases loaded, no one out, and the Giants trailing the Washington Nationals 10–7, and hit a walk-off grand slam off of Mitchell Parker, as the Giants completed a comeback from an eight–run deficit. On August 29, Eldridge recorded four hits and four RBI in a 7–2 victory over the Arizona Diamondbacks, becoming the first Giant to do so since Buster Posey in 2010.

== Personal life ==
Eldridge is the grandson of Edward B Kenney who served in the Korean War and received a Purple Heart, Bronze Star for Valor and the Combat Infantry badge. He served on the Senate Armed Services Committee as well. He is also the grandson of Bluegrass Music Hall of Famer Ben Eldridge, banjoist of the Seldom Scene, and the nephew of Chris Eldridge of Punch Brothers. Eldridge grew up a Washington Nationals fan.

== See also ==
- List of Major League Baseball ultimate grand slams
