= Nick Pratto =

American baseball player (born 1998)

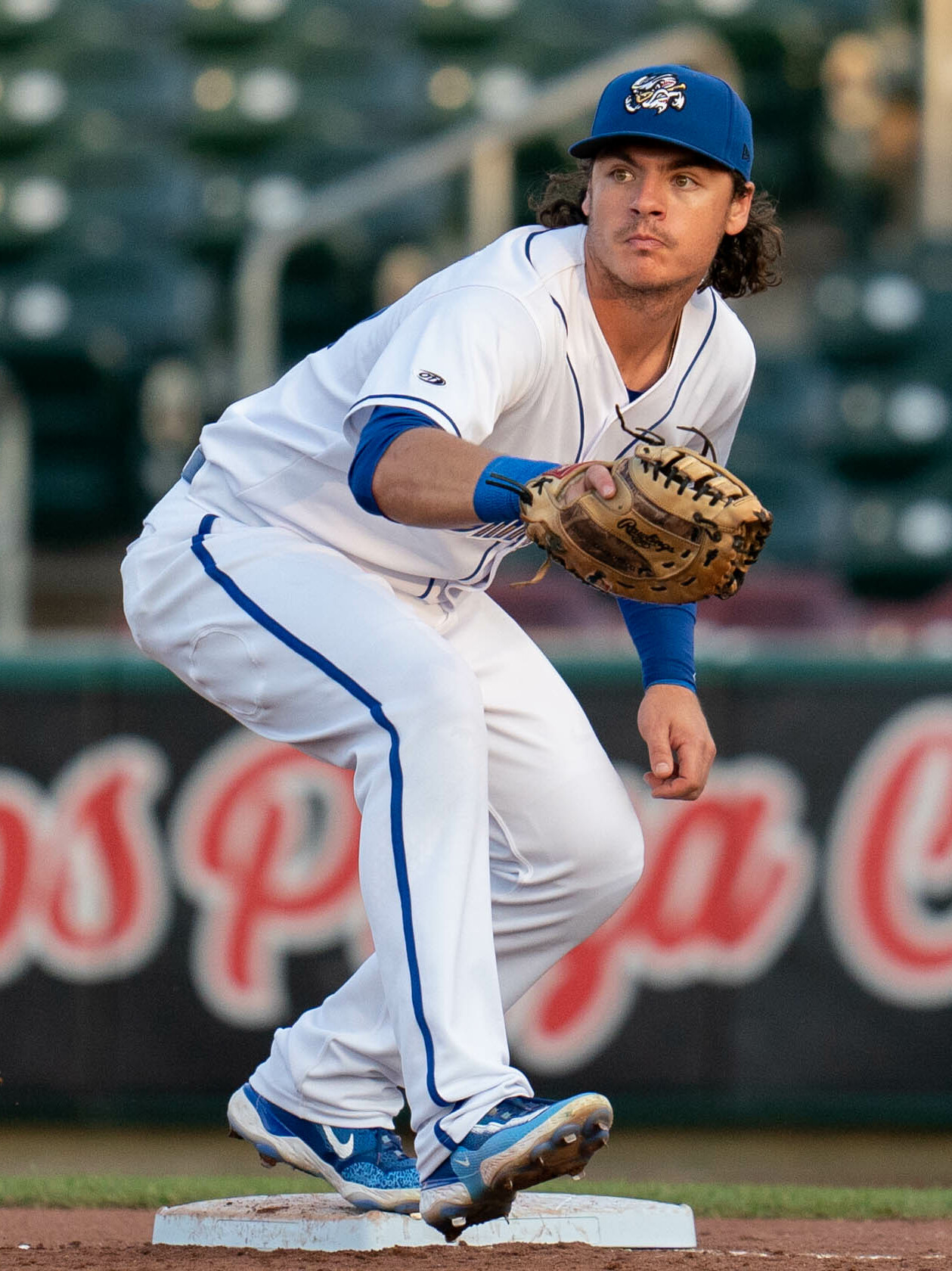
- Pratto with the Omaha Storm Chasers in 2023

San Diego Padres
- First baseman
- Born: October 6, 1998 (age 28); Huntington Beach, California, U.S.
- Bats: Left Throws: Left

MLB debut
- July 14, 2022, for the Kansas City Royals

MLB statistics (through 2024 season)
- Batting average: .216
- Home runs: 14
- Runs batted in: 55
- Stats at Baseball Reference

Teams
- Kansas City Royals (2022–2024)
Medals
Men's baseball
Representing United States
U-18 Baseball World Cup
Gold medal – first place	2015 Osaka	Team

Nicholas Michael Pratto (born October 6, 1998) is an American professional baseball first baseman in the San Diego Padres organization. He has previously played in Major League Baseball (MLB) for the Kansas City Royals.

== Amateur career ==
Pratto grew up in Huntington Beach, California, and played for their Little League Baseball team in the 2011 Little League World Series. Huntington Beach made it to the championship game against Japan, and Pratto hit a walk-off single to win the championship. In 2015, he played for Team USA in the U-18 Baseball World Cup.

Pratto attended Mater Dei High School in Santa Ana, California, for his first two years of high school before transferring to Huntington Beach High School in Huntington Beach. At Huntington Beach, he was teammates with Hagen Danner. As a senior in 2017, he hit .330 with nine home runs and 22 RBIs. He committed to the University of Southern California (USC) to play college baseball.

== Professional career ==
=== Kansas City Royals ===
==== 2017–2021: draft and minor leagues ====
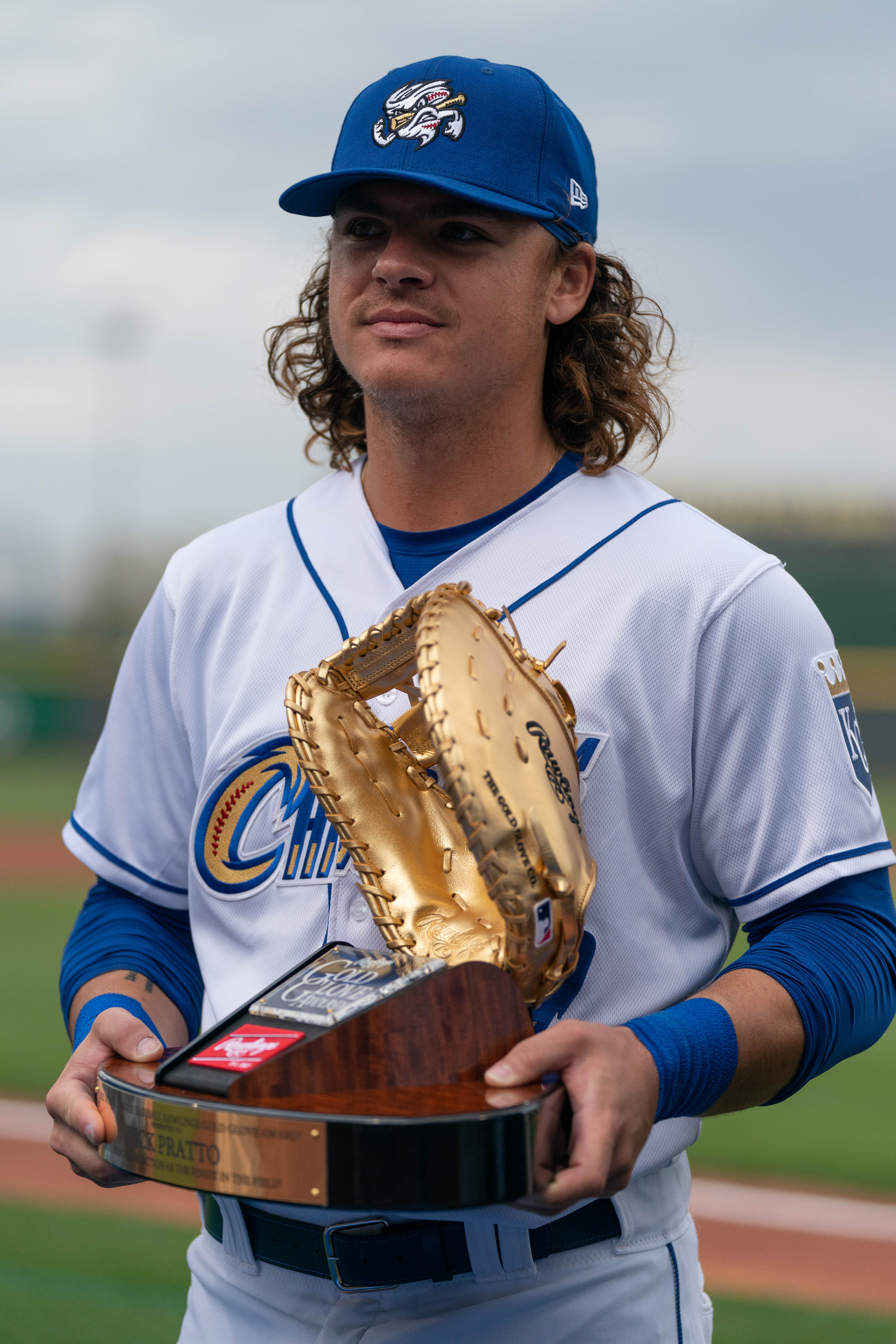
Pratto with the 2021 Minor League Gold Glove Award

Pratto was considered one of the top prospects for the 2017 Major League Baseball draft. He was selected by the Kansas City Royals with the 14th overall pick in the draft. He signed with the Royals, bypassing his commitment to USC, for a $3.45 million signing bonus. He made his professional debut with the Arizona League Royals of the Rookie-level Arizona League, posting a .247 batting average with four home runs, 34 RBI and ten stolen bases over 52 games. He spent 2018 with the Lexington Legends of the Single–A South Atlantic League, slashing .280/.343/.443 with 14 home runs, 62 RBI, and 22 stolen bases over 127 games.

Pratto spent the 2019 season with the Wilmington Blue Rocks of the High–A Carolina League. Over 124 games, he slashed .191/.278/.310 with nine home runs and 46 RBIs. Pratto did not play in a game in 2020 due to the cancellation of the Minor League Baseball season because of the COVID-19 pandemic.

Pratto began the 2021 season with the Northwest Arkansas Naturals of Double-A Central. In June, Pratto was selected to play in the All-Star Futures Game. He was promoted to the Omaha Storm Chasers of Triple-A West in mid-July. Over 124 games between the two teams, Pratto slashed .265/.385/.602 with 36 home runs, 98 RBIs, 28 doubles, and 12 stolen bases. His 36 home runs were second in the minor leagues behind teammate MJ Melendez. Following the season, he was awarded the Minor League Gold Glove Award as the best-fielding first baseman at any level of Minor League Baseball.

==== 2022–2025: MLB debut and Triple-A options ====
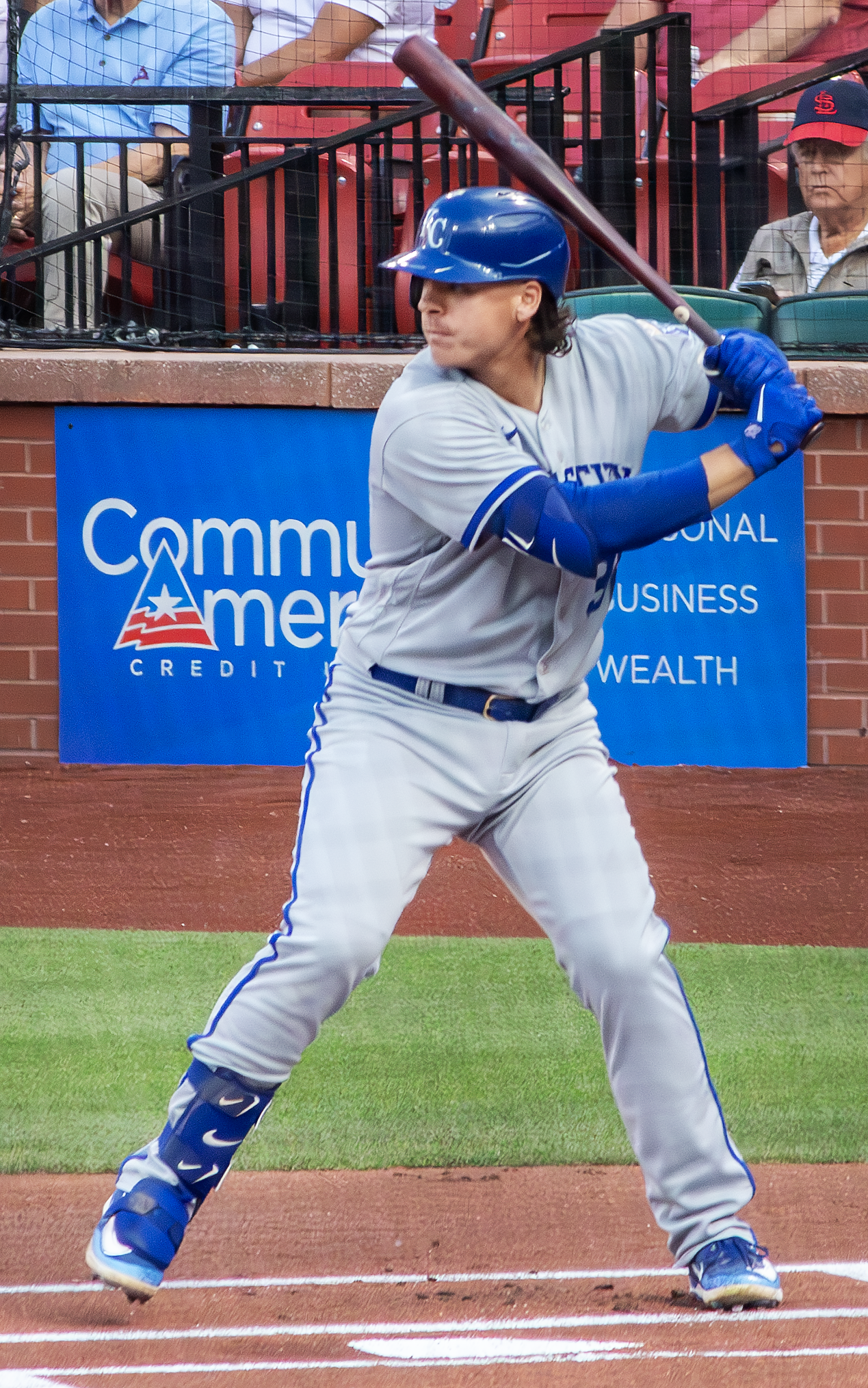
Nick Pratto with the Royals in 2023.

The Royals selected Pratto to their 40-man roster following the season on November 19, 2021, to protect him from becoming eligible in the Rule 5 draft. He began the 2022 season with Omaha and was promoted to the major leagues to make his major league debut on July 14. He recorded his first MLB hit on July 15 off Alek Manoah of the Toronto Blue Jays at Rogers Centre with a single in the fifth inning. On July 17, Pratto hit his first career home run, a solo shot off of Toronto starter José Berríos. On August 6, Pratto hit a walk-off home run off of Boston Red Sox reliever Garrett Whitlock.

Pratto was optioned to Triple-A Omaha to begin the 2023 season. In 95 games for Kansas City, he batted .232/.307/.353 with seven home runs and 35 RBI.

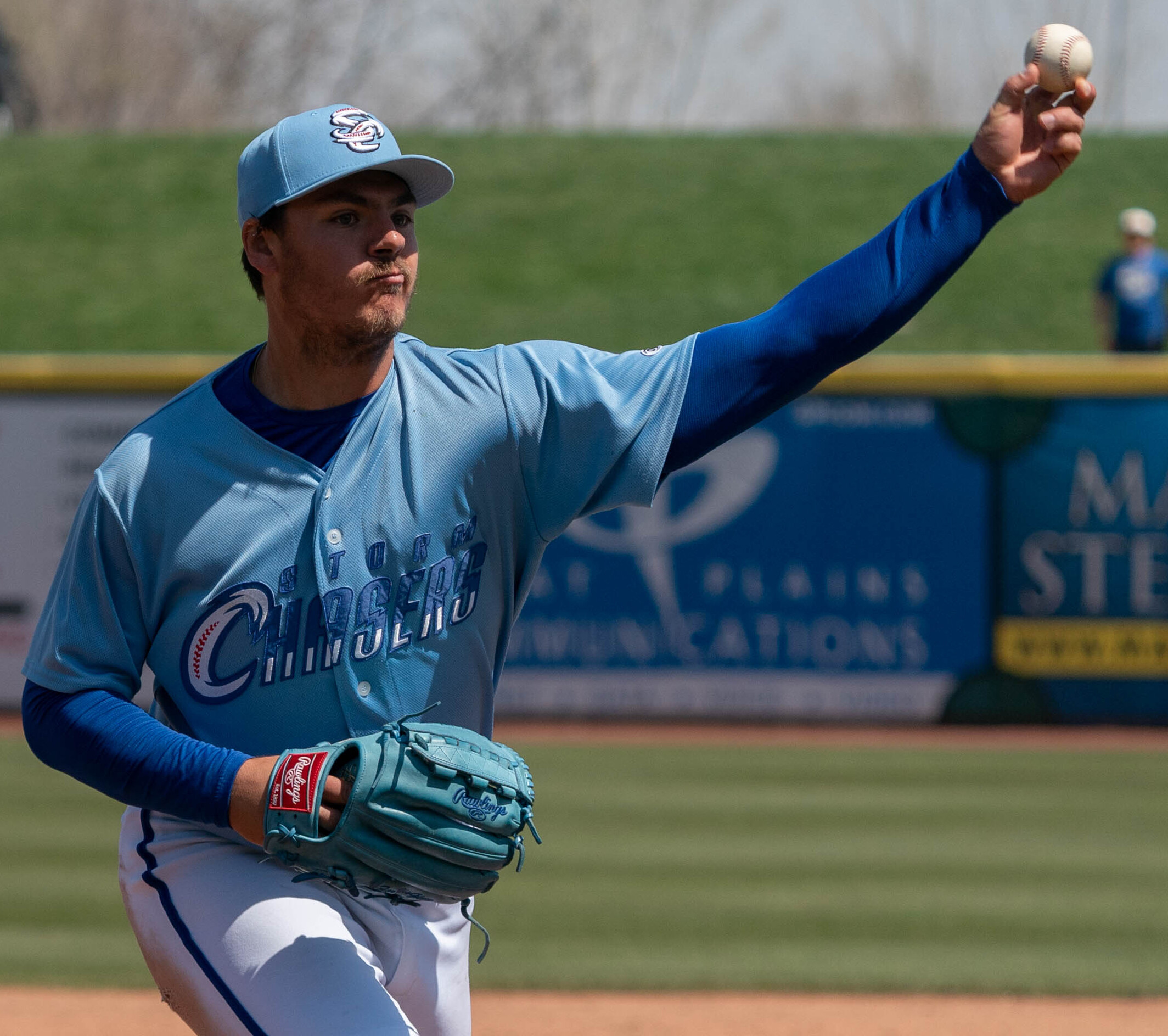
Pratto pitching in 2025

Pratto was again optioned to Triple-A Omaha to begin the 2024 season, despite a strong spring training that saw him hit .421 with four home runs. On June 11, Pratto made his only appearance for the Royals in 2024, pitching in relief against the New York Yankees. He pitched a scoreless ninth inning, striking out Jahmai Jones. He was optioned back to Omaha on June 14. Pratto played in 115 Triple-A games in 2024, batting .242 with 16 home runs.

On March 23, 2025, Pratto was removed from the 40-man roster and sent outright to Triple-A Omaha. He made 114 appearances for the Storm Chasers, slashing .196/.289/.331 with nine home runs, 42 RBI, and eight stolen bases. Pratto elected free agency following the season on November 6.

=== Texas Rangers ===
On January 30, 2026, Pratto signed a minor league contract with the Texas Rangers. He made 26 appearances for the Triple-A Round Rock Express, batting .237/.287/.473 with five home runs and 17 RBI. Pratto was released by the Rangers organization on June 9.

=== San Diego Padres ===
On June 10, 2026, Pratto signed a minor league contract with the San Diego Padres. In 71 games with Triple-A El Paso Chihuahuas he batted .271/.377/.441 with 7 home runs, 37 RBIs and 10 stolen bases.

On November 3, 2026, Pratto re-signed with the Padres on a new minor league contract for the 2027 season.
