= Aidan Miller =

American baseball player (born 2004)

Philadelphia Phillies
- Shortstop
- Born: June 9, 2004 (age 22); Dunedin, Florida, U.S.
- Bats: Right Throws: Right
- Stats at Baseball Reference
Medals
Men's baseball
Representing United States
U-18 Baseball World Cup
Gold medal – first place	2022 Sarasota-Bradenton	Team

Aidan Bauer Miller (born June 9, 2004) is an American professional baseball shortstop in the Philadelphia Phillies organization.

== Amateur career ==
Miller grew up in Trinity, Florida and attended J. W. Mitchell High School. He committed to play college baseball for the Arkansas Razorbacks when he was a sophomore in high school. Miller played for the United States national baseball team in the U-15 Baseball World Cup. He also played for the United States in the 2022 U-18 Baseball World Cup and was named to the All-Tournament team after batting .478 with two home runs, three triples, seven walks and eight runs batted in as Team USA won the gold medal.

Miller played in the 2022 MLB High School All-American Game at Dodger Stadium and was named the game's MVP while also winning the event's home run derby. Miller was also awarded Perfect Game USA's Jackie Robinson Award. Miller missed the beginning of his senior season in 2023 at J.W. Mitchell due to a broken hamate bone.

== Professional career ==
The Philadelphia Phillies selected Miller in the first round, with the 27th overall selection, of the 2023 Major League Baseball draft. On July 18, 2023, Miller signed with the Phillies on an above slot deal worth $3.1 million.

Miller made his professional debut after signing with the Florida Complex League Phillies and also played for the Clearwater Threshers, hitting .303 over twenty games between both affiliates. In 2024, he played with Clearwater, the Jersey Shore BlueClaws, and the Reading Fightin Phils, batting .261 with 11 home runs, 60 RBIs, and 23 stolen bases over 102 games. Miller was assigned back to Reading to open the 2025 season. In August, he was promoted to the Triple-A Lehigh Valley IronPigs. Across 116 games between both teams, Miller hit .264 with 14 home runs, 42 RBIs, 27 doubles and 59 stolen bases.

Miller opened the 2026 season on the injured list with a back surgery. On June 3, 2026, it was later announced he would undergo radiofrequency ablation, which would rule him out for at least six-to-eight weeks. Miller made his season debut on a rehab assignment with Clearwater before he was then transferred to Reading. He appeared in four games for the season between both teams, and hit .333 across 12 at bats. After the season, Miller was assigned to play in the Arizona Fall League with the Surprise Saguaros.
