= Blake Rutherford =

American baseball player (born 1997)

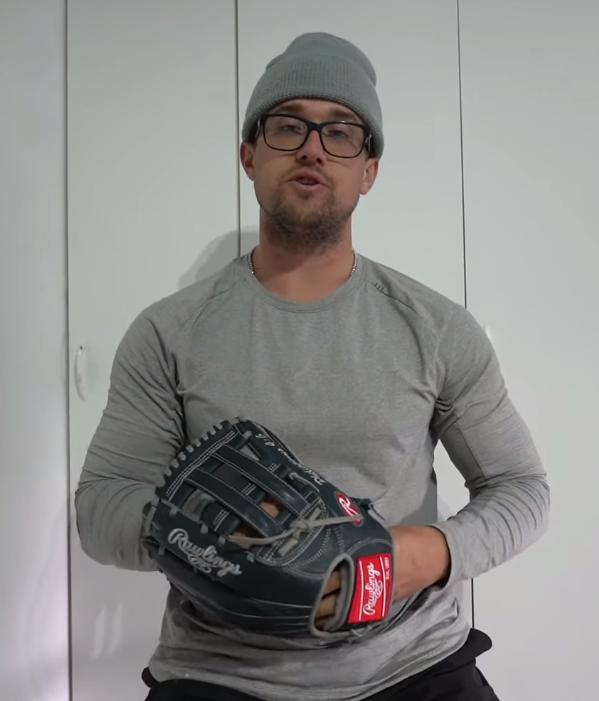
- Rutherford in 2024

Staten Island FerryHawks – No. 23
- Outfielder
- Born: May 2, 1997 (age 29); Simi Valley, California, U.S.
- Bats: Left Throws: Right

MLB debut
- August 4, 2023, for the Washington Nationals

MLB statistics (through 2023 season)
- Batting average: .171
- Home runs: 0
- Runs batted in: 2
- Stats at Baseball Reference

Teams
- Washington Nationals (2023)
Medals
Men's baseball
Representing United States
U-18 Baseball World Cup
Gold medal – first place	2015 Osaka	Team

Blake Rutherford (born May 2, 1997) is an American professional baseball outfielder for the Staten Island FerryHawks of the Atlantic League of Professional Baseball. He has previously played in Major League Baseball (MLB) for the Washington Nationals. The New York Yankees selected him in the first round of the 2016 MLB draft. He made his MLB debut in 2023 with the Nationals.

== Amateur career ==
Rutherford attended the Chaminade College Preparatory School in West Hills, California. As a freshman, Rutherford committed to play college baseball at University of California, Los Angeles (UCLA). As a junior, he hit .435 with four home runs. In August 2015, he played in the Under Armour All-America Game at Wrigley Field. As a senior, he batted .577.

Rutherford was considered one of the top prospects for the 2016 MLB draft.

== Professional career ==
=== New York Yankees ===
Rutherford was selected by the New York Yankees with the 18th overall pick in the 2016 MLB draft, and signed a contract with the team on June 29, 2016, with a signing bonus of $3,282,000. Rutherford began his professional career with the Gulf Coast Yankees of the Rookie-level Gulf Coast League, and was promoted to the Pulaski Yankees of the Rookie-level Appalachian League after a few weeks. He finished his first professional season batting .351 with three home runs and 12 RBI in 33 games between both clubs. Rutherford began the 2017 season with the Charleston RiverDogs of the Single–A South Atlantic League.

=== Chicago White Sox ===
On July 18, 2017, the Yankees traded Rutherford, Tyler Clippard, Ian Clarkin, and Tito Polo to the Chicago White Sox in exchange for David Robertson, Todd Frazier, and Tommy Kahnle. Rutherford then joined the Single–A Kannapolis Intimidators. He finished 2017 with a combined .260 batting average with two home runs and 35 RBI in 101 games between both teams. In 2018, he played for the Winston-Salem Dash, slashing .293/.345/.436 with seven home runs, 78 RBI, and 15 stolen bases in 115 games. He spent 2019 with the Birmingham Barons, batting .265 with seven home runs and 49 RBI over 118 games. He was selected to play in the Arizona Fall League for the Glendale Desert Dogs following the season.

On November 20, 2019, the White Sox added Rutherford to their 40-man roster to protect him from the Rule 5 draft. He did not play in a game in 2020 due to the cancellation of the minor league season because of the COVID-19 pandemic. Rutherford spent the 2021 season with the Charlotte Knights where he slashed .250/.286/.404 with 11 home runs and 54 RBI over 115 games. On March 29, 2022, Rutherford was designated for assignment after Chicago acquired Adam Haseley. He cleared waivers and was sent outright to Triple-A on April 1. Spending the year with Triple-A Charlotte, Rutherford played in 116 games, posting a slash of .271/.311/.428 with 13 home runs, 58 RBI, and 8 stolen bases. He elected free agency following the season on November 10.

=== Washington Nationals ===
On February 3, 2023, Rutherford signed a minor league contract with the Washington Nationals organization. In 62 games split between the Double–A Harrisburg Senators and Triple–A Rochester Red Wings, he hit a cumulative .345/.395/.583 with 11 home runs, 43 RBI, and 7 stolen bases. On August 4, Rutherford was selected to the 40-man roster and promoted to the major leagues for the first time. In 16 games for Washington, he went 6–for–35 (.171) with 2 RBI and one walk. Following the season on October 18, Rutherford was removed from the 40–man roster and sent outright to Triple–A Rochester. However, he subsequently rejected the assignment and elected free agency.

=== Kansas City Monarchs ===
On April 17, 2024, Rutherford signed with the Kansas City Monarchs of the American Association of Professional Baseball. In 17 games, he batted .328/.380/.531 with 3 home runs and 20 RBI.

=== Toros de Tijuana ===
On June 14, 2024, Rutherford's contract was purchased by the Toros de Tijuana of the Mexican League. In 24 games for Tijuana, he batted .257/.337/.608 with seven home runs and 13 RBI.

Rutherford made 17 appearances for Tijuana in 2025, slashing .250/.292/.433 with two home runs and five RBI.

=== Kansas City Monarchs (second stint) ===
On June 4, 2025, Rutherford was loaned to the Kansas City Monarchs of the American Association of Professional Baseball. In 50 appearances for the Monarchs, Rutherford slashed .240/.285/.380 with five home runs, 30 RBI, and five stolen bases.

=== Kane County Cougars ===
On August 21, 2025, Rutherford signed with the Kane County Cougars of the American Association of Professional Baseball. In eight appearances for the Cougars, he went 9-for-27 (.333) with one home run and three RBI. With Kane County, Rutherford won the American Association championship.

=== Staten Island FerryHawks ===
On April 18, 2026, Rutherford signed with the Staten Island FerryHawks of the Atlantic League of Professional Baseball.

== Personal life ==
Rutherford's older brother, Cole, was a prospect for the San Diego Padres.
