= South Africa national under-18 baseball team =

South Africa Baseball U-18

Information
- Country: South Africa
- Federation: South African Baseball Union
- Confederation: WBSC Africa

WBSC ranking
- Current: 24 (26 October 2026)

The South Africa national under-18 baseball team is the national under-18 team representing South Africa in international baseball competitions. The organization is currently ranked 26th in the world by the World Baseball Softball Confederation. They compete in the bi-annual U-18 Baseball World Cup.

== See also ==
- South Africa national baseball team
- South African Baseball Union
- U-18 Baseball World Cup
