= Mexico national under-18 baseball team =

Mexico Baseball U-18

Information
- Country: Mexico
- Federation: Mexican Federation of Baseball
- Confederation: Pan American Baseball Confederation

WBSC ranking
- Current: 6 (26 October 2026)

The Mexico national under-18 baseball team is the national under-18 team representing Mexico in international baseball competitions. The organization is currently ranked 4th in the world by the World Baseball Softball Confederation. They compete in the bi-annual U-18 Baseball World Cup.

== See also ==
- Mexico national baseball team
- U-18 Baseball World Cup
