= Brazil national under-18 baseball team =

Brazil Baseball U-18

Information
- Country: Brazil
- Confederation: WBSC Americas

WBSC ranking
- Current: 21 (26 October 2026)

The Brazil national under-18 baseball team is the national under-18 team representing Brazil in international baseball competitions. The organization is currently ranked 25th in the world by the World Baseball Softball Confederation. They compete in the bi-annual U-18 Baseball World Cup.

== See also ==
- Brazil national baseball team
- U-18 Baseball World Cup
