= Japan national under-18 baseball team =

Japan Baseball U-18

Information
- Country: Japan
- Federation: Baseball Federation of Japan
- Confederation: Baseball Federation of Asia

WBSC ranking
- Current: 1 (26 October 2026)
- Best result: (gold) 1st (1 time, in 2023)

Medal record

U-18 World Cup
Gold medal – first place	2023 Taiwan	

The Japan national under-18 baseball team is the national under-18 team representing Japan in international baseball competitions. The organization is currently ranked 1st in the world by the World Baseball Softball Confederation. They compete in the bi-annual U-18 Baseball World Cup. They have finished 2nd in the tournament four times.

== Competitive record ==
U-18 Baseball World Cup record
Year	Round	Position	W	L	RS	RA
1982	Final	2nd				
1999		5th				
2004	Final	2nd				
2012	Round 2	6th	5	4	38	25
2013	Final	2nd	7	2	70	19
2015	Final	2nd	8	1	81	5
2017	Super Round	3rd	6	3	52	24
2019	Super Round	5th	5	3	55	23
2021	Super Round	3rd	6	3	43	38
2023	Final	1st	7	2		
2025	Final	2nd	8	1		
Total						

== See also ==
- Japan national baseball team
- Baseball Federation of Japan
- U-18 Baseball World Cup
