= 2017 Chicago White Sox season =

2017 Chicago White Sox
- League: American League
- Division: Central
- Ballpark: Guaranteed Rate Field
- City: Chicago
- Record: 67–95 (.414)
- Divisional place: 4th
- Owners: Jerry Reinsdorf
- General managers: Rick Hahn
- Managers: Rick Renteria
- Television: CSN Chicago; CSN+ WGN-TV; WPWR-TV (Ken Harrelson, Steve Stone, Jason Benetti, Tom Paciorek)
- Radio: WLS; Chicago White Sox Radio Network (Ed Farmer, Jason Benetti, Darrin Jackson); WRTO-AM (Spanish) (Hector Molina, Billy Russo)
- Stats: ESPN.com; Baseball Reference

The 2017 Chicago White Sox season was the franchise's 118th season in Chicago and 117th in the American League. It was also the team's first season under new manager Rick Renteria following Robin Ventura, who chose not to extend his contract with the team after five seasons. The White Sox missed the playoffs for the ninth consecutive season, and finished in fourth place in the American League Central and second worst in the AL respectively.

== Offseason ==
After another disappointing season in 2016, GM Rick Hahn and the White Sox decided to rebuild the franchise for future success.

- November 3, 2016, Matt Albers, Alex Avila, Austin Jackson and Justin Morneau granted free agency. White Sox released pitcher Daniel Webb.
- November 7, 2016, Jason Bourgeois, Tony Campana, Brett Hayes, Slade Heathcott, John Holdzkom, Kameron Loe, Andy Parrino, J. B. Shuck, Jacob Turner and Chris Volstad granted free agency. Selected pitcher Giovanni Soto off waivers from the Oakland Athletics.
- November 22, 2016, White Sox released pitcher Anthony Ranaudo.
- December 2, 2016, White Sox signed pitcher Jorge Rondón as a free agent. Blake Smith granted free agency.
- December 6, 2016, White Sox ace Chris Sale was traded to the Boston Red Sox for prospects Luis Alexander Basabe, Víctor Díaz, Michael Kopech and Yoan Moncada.
- December 7, 2016, Rick Hahn traded away their leadoff hitter, outfielder Adam Eaton to the Washington Nationals for pitching prospects Dane Dunning, Lucas Giolito and Reynaldo López.
- December 8, 2016, the White Sox drafted pitcher Dylan Covey from the Oakland Athletics in the 2016 rule 5 draft.
- December 9, 2016, White Sox signed outfielder Caleb Gindl as a free agent.
- December 14, 2016, White Sox signed pitcher Derek Holland as a free agent.
- December 16, 2016, White Sox signed pitcher Chris Volstad as a free agent.
- December 22, 2016, White Sox signed Cody Asche as a free agent.
- December 28, 2016, White Sox released pitcher Jorge Rondón.
- January 6, 2017, White Sox selected outfielder Willy García off waivers from the Pittsburgh Pirates.
- January 7, 2017, White Sox signed outfielder Jason Bourgeois and shortstop Everth Cabrera as free agents.
- January 10, 2017, White Sox signed catcher Geovany Soto as a free agent.
- January 11, 2017, White Sox signed catcher Carson Blair as a free agent. Outfielder Jason Coats selected by the Tampa Bay Rays off waivers.
- January 12, 2017, White Sox signed pitcher Cory Luebke as a free agent.
- January 20, 2017, White Sox signed pitcher Gregory Infante as a free agent.
- January 23, 2017, White Sox signed pitchers Blake Smith and Anthony Swarzak as free agents.
- January 27, 2017, White Sox signed pitcher Mayckol Guaipe as a free agent.
- January 30, 2017, White Sox Signed outfielder Peter Bourjos as a free agent.
- February 13, 2017, White Sox signed pitcher Tyler Matzek as a free agent.
- February 18, 2017, White Sox signed pitcher Scott Snodgress as a free agent.
- February 27, 2017, White Sox signed Tyler Ladendorf as a free agent.
- March 2, 2017, White Sox signed pitcher Jake Dunning as a free agent.
- March 3, 2017, White Sox released infielder Brett Lawrie.
- March 20, 2017, White Sox released outfielder Caleb Gindl.
- March 25, 2017, White Sox released pitcher Mayckol Guaipe.
- March 28, 2017, White Sox sold outfielder Peter Bourjos to the Tampa Bay Rays.
- March 30, 2017, White Sox released pitchers Tyler Matzek and Blake Smith.

== Regular season ==
During the season GM Rick Hahn continued his rebuild plan to trade away key players for top prospects.

- April 8, 2017, White Sox signed pitcher Mike Pelfrey and Ryan Raburn as free agents.
- May 8, 2017, pitcher Cory Luebke voluntarily retired.
- May 26, 2017, White Sox traded Ryan Raburn to the Washington Nationals for a player to be named later or cash.
- June 6, 2017, White Sox signed pitcher Bobby Parnell as a free agent.
- June 9, 2017, White Sox released catcher Giovanni Soto. Selected Alen Hanson off waivers from the Pittsburgh Pirates.
- June 21, 2017, White Sox signed second baseman Grant Green as a free agent.
- June 28, 2017, White Sox released pitcher Jake Dunning.
- June 29, 2017, White Sox signed catcher Rob Brantly as a free agent.
- July 13, 2017, the White Sox traded away their ace José Quintana to their crosstown rival Chicago Cubs for Dylan Cease, Bryant Flete, Eloy Jiménez and Matt Rose.
- July 14, 2017, White Sox released shortstop Everth Cabrera.
- July 19, 2017, the White Sox traded third baseman Todd Frazier, relief pitcher Tommy Kahnle and closer David Robertson to the New York Yankees for Ian Clarkin, Tito Polo, Blake Rutherford and Tyler Clippard.
- July 24, 2017, White Sox signed pitcher Danny Farquhar as a free agent. Purchased pitchers Mark Lowe and Jean Machi from the Seattle Mariners. Released catcher Carson Blair and pitcher Bobby Parnell.
- July 26, 2017, a trade with the Milwaukee Brewers sent relief pitcher Anthony Swarzak for outfielder Ryan Cordell.
- July 27, 2017, the White Sox sent relief pitcher Dan Jennings to the Tampa Bay Rays for first baseman Casey Gillaspie.
- July 30, 2017, Rick Hahn traded outfielder Melky Cabrera and cash to division rival Kansas City Royals for Andre Davis and pitcher A. J. Puckett.
- August 4, 2017, White Sox signed pitcher Al Alburquerque as a free agent.
- August 7, 2017, White Sox released second baseman Grant Green.
- August 9, 2017, White Sox purchased pitcher Steve Johnson from the Baltimore Orioles.
- August 13, 2017, recently acquired pitcher Tyler Clippard was traded to the Houston Astros for a player to be named later or cash.
- August 21, 2017, White Sox released pitcher Mark Lowe.
- August 31, 2017, pitcher Miguel González was traded to the Texas Rangers for third baseman Ti'Quan Forbes.
- September 5, 2017, White Sox released pitcher Derek Holland.

=== Season standings ===
==== American League Central ====
AL Central
Team	W	L	Pct.	GB	Home	Road
Cleveland Indians	102	60	.630	—	49‍–‍32	53‍–‍28
Minnesota Twins	85	77	.525	17	41‍–‍40	44‍–‍37
Kansas City Royals	80	82	.494	22	43‍–‍38	37‍–‍44
Chicago White Sox	67	95	.414	35	39‍–‍42	28‍–‍53
Detroit Tigers	64	98	.395	38	34‍–‍47	30‍–‍51

==== American League Wild Card ====
Division leaders
Team	W	L	Pct.
Cleveland Indians	102	60	.630
Houston Astros	101	61	.623
Boston Red Sox	93	69	.574

Wild Card teams (Top 2 teams qualify for postseason)
Team	W	L	Pct.	GB
New York Yankees	91	71	.562	+6
Minnesota Twins	85	77	.525	—
Kansas City Royals	80	82	.494	5
Los Angeles Angels	80	82	.494	5
Tampa Bay Rays	80	82	.494	5
Seattle Mariners	78	84	.481	7
Texas Rangers	78	84	.481	7
Toronto Blue Jays	76	86	.469	9
Baltimore Orioles	75	87	.463	10
Oakland Athletics	75	87	.463	10
Chicago White Sox	67	95	.414	18
Detroit Tigers	64	98	.395	21

==== Record against opponents ====
2017 American League record Source: MLB Standings Grid – 2017
Team	BAL	BOS	CWS	CLE	DET	HOU	KC	LAA	MIN	NYY	OAK	SEA	TB	TEX	TOR	NL
Baltimore	—	10–9	4–3	1–6	3–4	1–5	3–3	2–4	2–5	7–12	4–3	4–2	8–11	6–1	12–7	8–12
Boston	9–10	—	6–1	4–3	3–4	3–4	2–4	2–4	5–2	8–11	3–4	3–3	11–8	5–1	13–6	16–4
Chicago	3–4	1–6	—	6–13	10–9	4–2	10–9	3–4	7–12	3–4	1–5	3–4	3–3	4–3	3–3	6–14
Cleveland	6–1	3–4	13–6	—	13–6	5–1	12–7	6–0	12–7	5–2	3–4	4–2	4–3	6–1	4–2	6–14
Detroit	4–3	4–3	9–10	6–13	—	3–4	8–11	3–4	8–11	3–3	1–5	1–6	2–5	1–5	3–3	8–12
Houston	5–1	4–3	2–4	1–5	4–3	—	3–4	12–7	5–1	5–2	12–7	14–5	3–4	12–7	4–3	15–5
Kansas City	3–3	4–2	9–10	7–12	11–8	4–3	—	6–1	8–11	2–5	3–3	5–2	4–3	1–6	3–3	9–11
Los Angeles	4–2	4–2	4–3	0–6	4–3	7–12	1–6	—	2–5	4–2	12–7	12–7	3–4	8–11	4–3	11–9
Minnesota	5–2	2–5	12–7	7–12	11–8	1–5	11–8	5–2	—	2–4	3–3	3–4	2–4	4–3	4–3	13–7
New York	12–7	11–8	4–3	2–5	3–3	2–5	5–2	2–4	4–2	—	2–5	5–2	12–7	3–3	9–10	15–5
Oakland	3–4	4–3	5–1	4–3	5–1	7–12	3–3	7–12	3–3	5–2	—	7–12	2–5	10–9	2–5	7–13
Seattle	2–4	3–3	4–3	2–4	6–1	5–14	2–5	7–12	4–3	2–5	12–7	—	5–1	11–8	1–6	12–8
Tampa Bay	11–8	8–11	3–3	3–4	5–2	4–3	3–4	4–3	4–2	7–12	5–2	1–5	—	2–4	9–10	11–9
Texas	1–6	1–5	3–4	1–6	5–1	7–12	6–1	11–8	3–4	3–3	9–10	8–11	4–2	—	3–4	14–6
Toronto	7–12	6–13	3–3	2–4	3–3	3–4	3–3	3–4	3–4	10–9	5–2	6–1	10–9	4–3	—	9–11

== Game log ==
2017 White Sox Game Log: 67–95 (Home: 39–42; Away: 28–53)
April 13–10 (Home: 6–5; Road 7–5)

#	Date	Opponent	Time	Score	Win	Loss	Save	Record	Attendance	Streak/ Box
—	April 3	Tigers	3:10 pm	**Postponed (rain)** (Rescheduled for April 4)						
1	April 4	Tigers	1:10 pm	3–6	Verlander (1–0)	**Quintana** (0–1)	Rodríguez (1)	0–1	36,534	L1
—	April 5	Tigers	1:10 pm	**Postponed (rain)** (Rescheduled for May 26)						
2	April 6	Tigers	1:10 pm	11–2	**Shields** (1–0)	Boyd (0–1)	—	1–1	10,842	W1
3	April 7	Twins	7:10 pm	1–3	Hughes (1–0)	**Holland** (0–1)	Kintzler (2)	1–2	14,004	L1
4	April 8	Twins	1:10 pm	6–2	**González** (1–0)	Mejía (0–1)	—	2–2	23,024	W1
5	April 9	Twins	1:10 pm	1–4	Santana (2–0)	**Quintana** (0–2)	Kintzler (3)	2–3	24,074	L1
6	April 11	@ Indians	3:10 pm	1–2 (10)	Shaw (1–0)	**Kahnle** (0–1)	—	2–4	35,002	L2
7	April 12	@ Indians	5:10 pm	2–1	**Holland** (1–1)	Salazar (0–1)	**Robertson** (1)	3–4	15,628	W1
8	April 13	@ Indians	5:10 pm	10–4	**Swarzak** (1–0)	Tomlin (0–2)	—	4–4	15,060	W2
9	April 14	@ Twins	7:10 pm	2–1	**Jennings** (1–0)	Pressly (0–1)	**Robertson** (2)	5–4	18,466	W3
10	April 15	@ Twins	1:10 pm	0–6	Santana (3–0)	**Quintana** (0–3)	—	5–5	25,938	L1
11	April 16	@ Twins	3:10 pm	3–1 (10)	**Jones** (1–0)	Pressly (0–2)	**Robertson** (3)	6–5	19,511	W1
12	April 17	@ Yankees	6:05 pm	4–7	Montgomery (1–0)	**Holland** (1–2)	Chapman (4)	6–6	28,181	L1
13	April 18	@ Yankees	6:05 pm	4–1	**González** (2–0)	Severino (1–1)	**Robertson** (4)	7–6	30,075	W1
14	April 19	@ Yankees	6:05 pm	1–9	Tanaka (2–1)	**Covey** (0–1)	—	7–7	30,014	L1
15	April 21	Indians	7:10 pm	0–3	Kluber (2–1)	**Quintana** (0–4)	—	7–8	18,159	L2
16	April 22	Indians	6:10 pm	0–7	Carrasco (2–1)	**Pelfrey** (0–1)	—	7–9	32,044	L3
17	April 23	Indians	1:10 pm	6–2	**Holland** (2–2)	Salazar (1–2)	—	8–9	24,444	W1
18	April 24	Royals	7:10 pm	12–1	**González** (3–0)	Vargas (3–1)	—	9–9	11,484	W2
19	April 25	Royals	7:10 pm	10–5	**Jennings** (2–0)	Duffy (2–1)	—	10–9	14,591	W3
20	April 26	Royals	1:10 pm	5–2	**Quintana** (1–4)	Karns (0–2)	**Robertson** (5)	11–9	18,218	W4
21	April 28	@ Tigers	6:10 pm	7–3	**Swarzak** (2–0)	Wilson (0–1)	—	12–9	26,049	W5
22	April 29	@ Tigers	12:10 pm	6–4 (10)	**Robertson** (1–0)	Wilson (1–1)	—	13–9	36,217	W6
23	April 30	@ Tigers	12:10 pm	3–7	Zimmermann (3–1)	**González** (3–1)	—	13–10	26,045	L1

May 11–18 (Home: 6–6; Road: 5–12)

#	Date	Opponent	Time	Score	Win	Loss	Save	Record	Attendance	Streak/ Box
24	May 1	@ Royals	7:15 pm	1–6	Vargas (4–1)	**Covey** (0–2)	—	13–11	20,148	L2
25	May 2	@ Royals	7:15 pm	6–0	**Quintana** (2–4)	Duffy (2–2)	—	14–11	18,604	W1
26	May 3	@ Royals	7:15 pm	1–6	Karns (1–2)	**Pelfrey** (0–2)	—	14–12	22,298	L1
27	May 4	@ Royals	1:15 pm	8–3	**Holland** (3–2)	Kennedy (0–3)	—	15–12	36,525	W1
28	May 5	@ Orioles	6:05 pm	2–4	Ynoa (1–0)	**González** (3–2)	Brach (6)	15–13	20,302	L1
29	May 6	@ Orioles	6:05 pm	5–6	Bundy (5–1)	**Covey** (0–3)	O'Day (2)	15–14	28,718	L2
30	May 7	@ Orioles	12:35 pm	0–4	Tillman (1–0)	**Quintana** (2–5)	Brach (7)	15–15	31,806	L3
31	May 9	Twins	7:10 pm	2–7	Santiago (4–1)	**Pelfrey** (0–3)	—	15–16	14,498	L4
—	May 10	Twins	7:10 pm	**Postponed (rain)** (Rescheduled for August 21)						
32	May 11	Twins	7:10 pm	6–7	Pressly (1–2)	**Holland** (3–3)	Kintzler (8)	15–17	16,084	L5
33	May 12	Padres	7:10 pm	3–6	Chacín (4–3)	**González** (3–3)	Maurer (5)	15–18	24,194	L6
34	May 13	Padres	6:10 pm	5–4	**Robertson** (2–0)	Hand (0–3)	—	16–18	29,111	W1
35	May 14	Padres	1:10 pm	9–3	**Ynoa** (1–0)	Buchter (2–2)	—	17–18	22,518	W2
36	May 15	@ Angels	9:07 pm	3–5	Chavez (3–5)	**Pelfrey** (0–4)	Norris (8)	17–19	29,445	L1
37	May 16	@ Angels	9:07 pm	6–7 (11)	Petit (1–0)	**Robertson** (2–1)	—	17–20	36,089	L2
38	May 17	@ Angels	9:07 pm	8–12	Shoemaker (3–2)	**González** (3–4)	—	17–21	33,234	L3
39	May 18	@ Mariners	9:10 pm	4–5	Vincent (2–1)	**Jennings** (2–1)	—	17–22	17,757	L4
40	May 19	@ Mariners	9:10 pm	2–1 (10)	**Robertson** (3–1)	Zych (2–1)	—	18–22	32,371	W1
41	May 20	@ Mariners	9:10 pm	16–1	**Pelfrey** (1–4)	Gallardo (2–4)	—	19–22	33,801	W2
42	May 21	@ Mariners	3:10 pm	8–1	**Holland** (4–3)	Heston (0–1)	—	20–22	36,782	W3
43	May 22	@ Diamondbacks	8:40 pm	1–5	Greinke (6–2)	**González** (3–5)	—	20–23	18,333	L1
44	May 23	@ Diamondbacks	8:40 pm	4–5	Corbin (4–4)	**Covey** (0–4)	Rodney (11)	20–24	17,865	L2
45	May 24	@ Diamondbacks	2:40 pm	6–8	Chafin (1–0)	**Quintana** (2–6)	Rodney (12)	20–25	18,002	L3
–	May 26	Tigers	4:10 pm	**Postponed (rain)** (Rescheduled for May 27)						
46	May 26	Tigers	7:45 pm	8–2	**Pelfrey** (2–4)	Boyd (2–5)	—	21–25	17,842	W1
47	May 27	Tigers	1:10 pm	3–0	**Danish** (1–0)	Fulmer (5–3)	**Robertson** (6)	22–25	26,327	W2
48	May 27	Tigers	4:30 pm	3–4	Farmer (1–0)	**Holland** (4–4)	—	22–26	26,327	L1
49	May 28	Tigers	1:10 pm	7–3	**González** (4–5)	Zimmermann (4–4)	**Robertson** (7)	23–26	27,578	W1
50	May 29	Red Sox	1:10 pm	5–4	**Minaya** (1–0)	Barnes (3–2)	**Robertson** (8)	24–26	27,148	W2
51	May 30	Red Sox	7:10 pm	7–13	Sale (6–2)	**Quintana** (2–7)	Kimbrel (14)	24–27	21,852	L1
52	May 31	Red Sox	7:10 pm	1–4	Pomeranz (5–3)	**Swarzak** (2–1)	Kimbrel (15)	24–28	19,075	L2

June 11–16 (Home: 6–6; Road: 5–10)

#	Date	Opponent	Time	Score	Win	Loss	Save	Record	Attendance	Streak/ Box
53	June 2	@ Tigers	6:10 pm	5–15	Fulmer (6–3)	**Holland** (4–5)	—	24–29	28,619	L3
54	June 3	@ Tigers	3:10 pm	1–10	Zimmermann (5–4)	**González** (4–6)	—	24–30	33,188	L4
55	June 4	@ Tigers	12:10 pm	4–7	Wilson (2–1)	**Robertson** (3–2)	—	24–31	30,208	L5
56	June 6	@ Rays	6:10 pm	4–2	**Beck** (1–0)	Archer (4–4)	**Robertson** (9)	25–31	14,590	W1
57	June 7	@ Rays	6:10 pm	1–3	Faria (1–0)	**Pelfrey** (2–5)	Colomé (16)	25–32	9,313	L1
58	June 8	@ Rays	6:10 pm	5–7	Odorizzi (4–3)	**Holland** (4–6)	Colomé (17)	25–33	8,971	L2
59	June 9	@ Indians	6:10 pm	3–7	Kluber (5–2)	**González** (4–7)	—	25–34	30,043	L3
60	June 10	@ Indians	6:15 pm	5–3	**Holmberg** (1–0)	Tomlin (3–8)	**Robertson** (10)	26–34	31,753	W1
61	June 11	@ Indians	12:10 pm	2–4	Carrasco (6–3)	**Quintana** (2–8)	Allen (15)	26–35	26,611	L1
62	June 12	Orioles	7:10 pm	10–7	**Petricka** (1–0)	Miley (2–4)	—	27–35	17,665	W1
63	June 13	Orioles	7:10 pm	6–1	**Holland** (5–6)	Asher (2–5)	—	28–35	15,038	W2
64	June 14	Orioles	7:10 pm	6–10	Bundy (7–5)	**González** (4–8)	—	28–36	20,008	L1
65	June 15	Orioles	1:10 pm	5–2	**Swarzak** (3–1)	Tillman (1–5)	—	29–36	20,139	W1
66	June 16	@ Blue Jays	6:07 pm	11–4	**Quintana** (3–8)	Biagini (1–6)	—	30–36	39,071	W2
67	June 17	@ Blue Jays	12:07 pm	5–2	**Pelfrey** (3–5)	Stroman (7–3)	**Robertson** (11)	31–36	47,171	W3
68	June 18	@ Blue Jays	12:07 pm	3–7	Happ (2–4)	**Swarzak** (3–2)	—	31–37	46,599	L1
69	June 20	@ Twins	7:10 pm	7–9	Santana (9–4)	**Holland** (5–7)	Kintzler (18)	31–38	26,095	L2
70	June 21	@ Twins	7:10 pm	2–4	Berríos (7–1)	**Holmberg** (1–1)	Kintzler (19)	31–39	33,316	L3
71	June 22	@ Twins	12:10 pm	9–0	**Quintana** (4–8)	Turley (0–2)	—	32–39	27,684	W1
72	June 23	Athletics	7:10 pm	0–3	Cotton (5–7)	**Pelfrey** (3–6)	Casilla (12)	32–40	25,370	L1
73	June 24	Athletics	1:10 pm	2–10	Gossett (1–2)	**Shields** (1–1)	—	32–41	38,618	L2
74	June 25	Athletics	1:10 pm	3–5	Gray (3–3)	**Kahnle** (0–2)	Casilla (13)	32–42	28,089	L3
75	June 26	Yankees	7:10 pm	5–6	Montgomery (6–4)	**Holmberg** (1–2)	Chapman (8)	32–43	20,339	L4
76	June 27	Yankees	7:10 pm	4–3	**Jennings** (3–1)	Betances (3–2)	—	33–43	18,023	W1
77	June 28	Yankees	7:10 pm	3–12	Tanaka (6–7)	**Rodon** (0–1)	—	33–44	15,259	L1
78	June 29	Yankees	7:10 pm	4–3	**Shields** (2–1)	Cessa (0–3)	**Robertson** (12)	34–44	21,032	W1
79	June 30	Rangers	7:10 pm	8–7	**Swarzak** (4–2)	Bush (2–4)	—	35–44	18,838	W2

July 6–18 (Home: 3–10; Road: 3–8)

#	Date	Opponent	Time	Score	Win	Loss	Save	Record	Attendance	Streak/ Box
80	July 1	Rangers	1:10 pm	4–10	Hamels (3–0)	**Holland** (5–8)	—	35–45	22,915	L1
81	July 2	Rangers	1:10 pm	6–5	**Robertson** (4–2)	Leclerc (1–2)	—	36–45	26,206	W1
82	July 3	@ Athletics	8:05 pm	7–2	**Rodon** (1–1)	Cotton (5–8)	—	37–45	40,019	W2
83	July 4	@ Athletics	3:05 pm	6–7	Casilla (2–3)	**Kahnle** (0–3)	—	37–46	16,314	L1
84	July 5	@ Athletics	2:35 pm	4–7	Gray (4–4)	**Pelfrey** (3–7)	—	37–47	13,813	L2
85	July 7	@ Rockies	7:40 pm	4–12	Márquez (6–4)	**Holland** (5–9)	—	37–48	38,386	L3
86	July 8	@ Rockies	8:10 pm	5–4	**Kahnle** (1–3)	Holland (1–1)	**Robertson** (13)	38–48	48,118	W1
87	July 9	@ Rockies	2:10 pm	0–10	Freeland (9–7)	**Rodon** (1–2)	—	38–49	36,541	L1
**88th All-Star Game in Miami, Florida**
88	July 14	Mariners	7:10 pm	2–4	Paxton (8–3)	**Shields** (2–2)	Díaz (14)	38–50	20,311	L2
89	July 15	Mariners	6:10 pm	3–4	Hernández (5–3)	**Swarzak** (4–3)	Díaz (15)	38–51	21,743	L3
90	July 16	Mariners	1:10 pm	6–7 (10)	Vincent (3–1)	**Beck** (1–1)	Díaz (16)	38–52	24,502	L4
91	July 18	Dodgers	7:10 pm	0–1	Kershaw (15–2)	**González** (4–9)	Jansen (24)	38–53	23,088	L5
92	July 19	Dodgers	7:10 pm	1–9 (8)	Maeda (8–4)	**Rodon** (1–3)	—	38–54	24,907	L6
93	July 21	@ Royals	7:15 pm	6–7 (10)	Feliz (2–5)	**Clippard** (1–6)	—	38–55	29,647	L7
94	July 22	@ Royals	6:15 pm	2–7	Alexander (2–3)	**Holmberg** (1–3)	—	38–56	34,088	L8
95	July 23	@ Royals	1:15 pm	4–5	Herrera (3–2)	**Infante** (0–1)	—	38–57	23,184	L9
96	July 24	@ Cubs	1:20 pm	3–1	**González** (5–9)	Grimm (1–1)	**Swarzak** (1)	39–57	40,849	W1
97	July 25	@ Cubs	1:20 pm	2–7	Lackey (7–9)	**Rodon** (1–4)	—	39–58	40,717	L1
98	July 26	Cubs	7:10 pm	3–8	Arrieta (10–7)	**Shields** (2–3)	—	39–59	38,517	L2
99	July 27	Cubs	7:10 pm	3–6	Lester (8–6)	**Pelfrey** (3–8)	—	39–60	39,422	L3
100	July 28	Indians	7:10 pm	3–9	Salazar (4–5)	**Holland** (5–10)	—	39–61	20,387	L4
101	July 29	Indians	6:10 pm	4–5	Miller (4–3)	**Bummer** (0–1)	Allen (19)	39–62	30,115	L5
102	July 30	Indians	1:10 pm	3–1	**Clippard** (2–6)	Shaw (4–5)	—	40–62	28,152	W1
103	July 31	Blue Jays	7:10 pm	7–6	**Beck** (2–1)	Osuna (3–2)	—	41–62	13,023	W2

August 11–18 (Home: 9–7; Road: 2–11)

#	Date	Opponent	Time	Score	Win	Loss	Save	Record	Attendance	Streak/ Box
104	August 1	Blue Jays	7:10 pm	4–8	Stroman (10–5)	**Pelfrey** (3–9)	—	41–63	14,622	L1
105	August 2	Blue Jays	1:10 pm	1–5	Happ (4–8)	**Holland** (5–11)	Osuna (27)	41–64	20,878	L2
106	August 3	@ Red Sox	6:10 pm	5–9	Porcello (5–14)	**González** (5–10)	—	41–65	37,442	L3
107	August 4	@ Red Sox	6:10 pm	2–3 (11)	Hembree (2–3)	**Bummer** (0–2)	—	41–66	36,612	L4
108	August 5	@ Red Sox	6:10 pm	1–4	Pomeranz (11–4)	**Shields** (2–4)	Kimbrel (26)	41–67	36,599	L5
109	August 6	@ Red Sox	12:35 pm	3–6	Fister (2–5)	**Pelfrey** (3–10)	Kimbrel (27)	41–68	37,283	L6
110	August 8	Astros	7:10 pm	8–5	**Holland** (6–11)	Keuchel (9–2)	**Clippard** (2)	42–68	13,974	W1
111	August 9	Astros	7:10 pm	7–1	**González** (6–10)	McHugh (0–1)	—	43–68	14,824	W2
112	August 10	Astros	7:10 pm	3–2 (11)	**Holmberg** (2–3)	Martes (4–2)	—	44–68	18,034	W3
113	August 11	Royals	7:10 pm	6–3	**Bummer** (1–2)	Duffy (7–8)	**Clippard** (3)	45–68	18,173	W4
114	August 12	Royals	6:10 pm	4–5	Alexander (3–3)	**Bummer** (1–3)	Herrera (25)	45–69	20,413	L1
115	August 13	Royals	1:10 pm	6–14	Vargas (14–6)	**Holland** (6–12)	—	45–70	27,351	L2
116	August 15	@ Dodgers	9:10 pm	1–6	Morrow (5–0)	**Minaya** (1–1)	—	45–71	46,385	L3
117	August 16	@ Dodgers	9:10 pm	4–5	Stripling (2–4)	**Petricka** (1–1)	—	45–72	52,413	L4
118	August 17	@ Rangers	7:05 pm	8–9	Bibens-Dirkx (4–2)	**López** (0–1)	Claudio (6)	45–73	23,459	L5
119	August 18	@ Rangers	7:05 pm	4–3	**Infante** (1–1)	Rodríguez (0–1)	**Minaya** (1)	46–73	23,402	W1
120	August 19	@ Rangers	7:05 pm	7–17	Pérez (8–10)	**Holland** (6–13)	—	46–74	33,441	L1
121	August 20	@ Rangers	2:05 pm	3–2	**González** (7–10)	Griffin (6–4)	**Minaya** (2)	47–74	23,861	W1
122	August 21	Twins	4:10 pm	7–6	**Rodon** (2–4)	Melville (0–1)	**Minaya** (3)	48–74	14,493	W2
123	August 21	Twins	7:10 pm	2–10	Gee (1–0)	**Fulmer** (0–1)	Duffey (1)	48–75	14,493	L1
124	August 22	Twins	7:10 pm	1–4	Gibson (7–10)	**Giolito** (0–1)	Belisle (4)	48–76	14,053	L2
125	August 23	Twins	7:10 pm	4–3	**Farquhar** (3–2)	Hildenberger (2–2)	—	49–76	15,605	W1
126	August 24	Twins	7:10 pm	5–1	**Holland** (7–13)	Berríos (11–6)	—	50–76	16,013	W2
127	August 25	Tigers	7:10 pm	3–2	**Minaya** (2–1)	Jiménez (0–2)	—	51–76	23,171	W3
128	August 26	Tigers	6:10 pm	3–6	Farmer (3–1)	**Rodon** (2–5)	Greene (5)	51–77	29,489	L1
129	August 27	Tigers	1:10 pm	7–1	**Giolito** (1–1)	Boyd (5–8)	—	52–77	22,532	W1
130	August 29	@ Twins	7:10 pm	4–6	Santana (14–7)	**Shields** (2–5)	Belisle (5)	52–78	20,530	L1
131	August 30	@ Twins	7:10 pm	1–11	Berríos (12–6)	**Holland** (7–14)	—	52–79	21,172	L2
132	August 31	@ Twins	12:10 pm	4–5	Belisle (1–2)	**Minaya** (2–2)	—	52–80	21,288	L3

September/October 15–15 (Home: 9–8; Road: 6–7)

#	Date	Opponent	Time	Score	Win	Loss	Save	Record	Attendance	Streak/ Box
133	September 1	Rays	7:10 pm	1–3	Snell (3–6)	**López** (0–2)	Colomé (41)	52–81	13,585	L4
134	September 2	Rays	6:10 pm	5–4	**Fulmer** (1–1)	Archer (9–8)	**Minaya** (4)	53–81	17,700	W1
135	September 3	Rays	1:10 pm	6–2	**Giolito** (2–1)	Andriese (5–2)	—	54–81	17,633	W2
136	September 4	Indians	1:10 pm	3–5	Bauer (15–8)	**Shields** (2–6)	Allen (24)	54–82	16,848	L1
137	September 5	Indians	7:10 pm	4–9	Otero (3–0)	**Holmberg** (2–4)	—	54–83	12,369	L2
138	September 6	Indians	7:10 pm	1–5	Carrasco (14–6)	**López** (0–3)	—	54–84	13,403	L3
139	September 7	Indians	7:10 pm	2–11	Kluber (15–4)	**Pelfrey** (3–11)	—	54–85	17,019	L4
140	September 8	Giants	7:10 pm	2–9	Moore (5–13)	**Giolito** (2–2)	—	54–86	16,852	L5
141	September 9	Giants	6:10 pm	13–1	**Shields** (3–6)	Samardzija (9–13)	—	55–86	17,688	W1
142	September 10	Giants	1:10 pm	8–1	**Fulmer** (2–1)	Bumgarner (3–8)	—	56–86	16,458	W2
143	September 11	@ Royals	7:15 pm	11–3	**López** (1–3)	Hammel (8–11)	—	57–86	23,135	W3
144	September 12	@ Royals	12:15 pm	3–4	Gaviglio (4–5)	**Covey** (0–5)	Alexander (4)	57–87	17,727	L1
145	September 13	@ Royals	1:15 pm	5–3	**Minaya** (3–2)	Alexander (4–4)	—	58–87	25,665	W1
146	September 14	@ Tigers	12:10 pm	17–7	**Shields** (4–6)	Bell (0–3)	—	59–87	26,743	W2
147	September 15	@ Tigers	6:10 pm	2–3	Greene (4–3)	**Alburquerque** (0–2)	—	59–88	25,298	L1
148	September 16	@ Tigers	5:10 pm	10–4	**López** (2–3)	Jaye (1–2)	—	60–88	29,846	W1
149	September 17	@ Tigers	12:10 pm	0–12	Boyd (6–10)	**Covey** (0–6)	—	60–89	25,663	L1
150	September 19	@ Astros	7:10 pm	1–3	McHugh (3–2)	**Giolito** (2–3)	Giles (32)	60–90	23,293	L2
151	September 20	@ Astros	7:10 pm	3–4	Peacock (12–2)	**Shields** (4–7)	Musgrove (2)	60–91	24,995	L3
152	September 21	@ Astros	7:10 pm	3–1	**Volstad** (1–0)	Keuchel (13–5)	**Minaya** (5)	61–91	24,283	W1
153	September 22	Royals	7:10 pm	7–6	**López** (3–3)	Hammel (8–13)	**Minaya** (6)	62–91	18,041	W2
154	September 23	Royals	6:10 pm	2–8	Duffy (9–9)	**Covey** (0–7)	—	62–92	20,306	L1
155	September 24	Royals	1:10 pm	8–1	**Giolito** (3–3)	Kennedy (4–13)	—	63–92	18,791	W1
156	September 25	Angels	7:10 pm	4–2	**Shields** (5–7)	Nolasco (6–15)	**Minaya** (7)	64–92	13,443	W2
157	September 26	Angels	7:10 pm	3–9	Bridwell (9–3)	**Volstad** (1–1)	—	64–93	13,786	L1
158	September 27	Angels	7:10 pm	6–4 (10)	**Farquhar** (4–2)	Parker (3–3)	—	65–93	17,012	W1
159	September 28	Angels	7:10 pm	5–4	**Infante** (2–1)	Chavez (7–11)	**Minaya** (8)	66–93	19,596	W2
160	September 29	@ Indians	6:10 pm	1–10	Bauer (17–9)	**Pelfrey** (3–12)	—	66–94	26,983	L1
161	September 30	@ Indians	6:10 pm	2–1	**Fulmer** (3–1)	Clevinger (12–6)	**Minaya** (9)	67–94	33,173	W1
162	October 1	@ Indians	2:10 pm	1–3	Tomlin (10–9)	**Volstad** (1–2)	Allen (30)	67–95	30,036	L1

Legend: = Win = Loss = Postponement
Bold = White Sox team member

== Personnel ==
=== Opening Day lineup ===
Opening Day Starters
Name	Pos.
Tyler Saladino	2B
Tim Anderson	SS
Melky Cabrera	LF
Jose Abreu	1B
Todd Frazier	3B
Cody Asche	DH
Avisaíl García	RF
Omar Narváez	C
Jacob May	CF
José Quintana	SP

=== Roster ===
2017 Chicago White Sox
Roster
Pitchers: 58 Al Alburquerque; 54 Chris Beck; 70 Aaron Bummer; 44 Tyler Clippard; 68 Dylan Covey; 60 Tyler Danish; 43 Danny Farquhar; 71 Jace Fry; 51 Carson Fulmer; 27 Lucas Giolito; 67 Brad Goldberg; 58 Miguel Gonzalez; 45 Derek Holland; 64 David Holmberg; 63 Greg Infante; 43 Dan Jennings; 65 Nate Jones; 48 Tommy Kahnle; 40 Reynaldo López; 37 Juan Minaya; 50 Mike Pelfrey; 52 Jake Petricka; 57 Zach Putnam; 62 José Quintana; 30 David Robertson; 55 Carlos Rodon; 33 James Shields; 34 Anthony Swarzak; 66 Chris Volstad; 66 Michael Ynoa	Catchers: 44 Rob Brantly; 38 Omar Narváez; 36 Kevan Smith; 18 Geovany Soto; Infielders: 79 José Abreu; 7 Tim Anderson; 25 Cody Asche; 24 Matt Davidson; 21 Todd Frazier; 10 Yoan Moncada; 20 Tyler Saladino; 5 Yolmer Sánchez	Outfielders: 53 Melky Cabrera; 30 Nick Delmonico; 41 Adam Engel; 26 Avisaíl García; 28 Leury García; 61 Willy García; 39 Alen Hanson; 48 Rymer Liriano; 32 Jacob May	Manager: 17 Rick Renteria; Coaches: 8 Daryl Boston (first base); 12 Nick Capra (third base); 99 Don Cooper (pitching); 29 Curt Hasler (bullpen); 47 Joe McEwing (bench/infield); 59 Mark Salas (bullpen catcher/catching); 46 Greg Sparks (assistant hitting); 31 Todd Steverson (hitting)

== Statistics ==
=== Batting ===
BOLD denotes team leader

Note: G = Games played; AB = At bats; R = Runs; H = Hits; 2B = Doubles; 3B = Triples; HR = Home runs; RBI = Runs batted in; SB = Stolen bases; BB = Walks; K = Strikeouts; AVG = Batting average; OBP = On base percentage; SLG = Slugging percentage;

Player	G	AB	R	H	2B	3B	HR	RBI	SB	BB	K	AVG	OBP	SLG
José Abreu	**156**	**621**	**95**	**189**	**43**	6	**33**	**102**	3	35	119	.304	.354	**.552**
Tim Anderson	146	587	72	151	26	4	17	56	**15**	13	162	.257	.276	.402
Cody Asche	19	57	5	6	1	0	1	4	0	3	21	.105	.177	.175
Rob Brantly	13	31	4	9	1	0	2	5	0	3	14	.290	.389	.516
Melky Cabrera	98	397	54	117	17	0	13	56	0	25	52	.295	.336	.436
Dylan Covey	1	1	0	0	0	0	0	0	0	0	1	.000	.000	.000
Matt Davidson	118	414	43	91	16	1	26	68	0	19	**165**	.220	.260	.452
Nicky Delmonico	43	141	25	37	4	0	9	23	2	23	31	.262	.373	.482
Adam Engel	97	301	34	50	11	3	6	21	8	19	117	.166	.235	.282
Todd Frazier	81	280	41	58	15	0	16	44	4	**48**	71	.207	.328	.432
Avisaíl García	136	518	75	171	27	5	18	80	5	33	111	**.330**	**.380**	.506
Leury García	87	300	41	81	15	2	9	33	8	13	69	.270	.316	.423
Willy García	44	105	15	25	5	3	2	12	0	11	31	.238	.305	.400
Miguel González	3	6	0	0	0	0	0	0	0	0	2	.000	.000	.000
Alen Hanson	69	160	28	37	9	1	4	10	9	10	43	.231	.276	.375
Derek Holland	1	1	0	1	0	0	0	0	0	0	0	1.000	1.000	1.000
Rymer Liriano	21	41	4	9	2	0	1	6	1	5	14	.220	.304	.341
Jacob May	15	36	2	2	0	0	0	3	0	3	17	.056	.150	.056
Yoan Moncada	54	199	31	46	8	2	8	22	3	29	74	.231	.338	.412
Omar Narváez	90	253	23	70	10	0	2	14	0	38	45	.277	.373	.340
José Quintana	2	3	0	0	0	0	0	1	0	0	2	.000	.000	.000
Carlos Rodon	3	6	0	2	1	0	0	2	0	0	2	.333	.333	.500
Tyler Saladino	79	253	23	45	9	2	0	10	5	23	67	.178	.254	.229
Yolmer Sánchez	141	484	63	129	19	**8**	12	59	8	35	111	.267	.319	.413
Kevan Smith	87	276	23	78	17	0	4	30	0	9	46	.283	.309	.388
Geovany Soto	13	42	5	8	0	0	3	9	0	4	10	.190	.271	.405
**Team totals**	**162**	**5513**	**706**	**1412**	**256**	**37**	**186**	**670**	**71**	**401**	**1397**	**.256**	**.314**	**.417**

=== Pitching ===
BOLD denotes team leader

Note: W = Wins; L = Losses; ERA = Earned run average; G = Games pitched; GS = Games started; SV = Saves; IP = Innings pitched; R = Runs allowed; ER = Earned runs allowed; BB = Walks allowed; K = Strikeouts

Player	W	L	ERA	G	GS	SV	IP	H	R	ER	BB	K
Al Alburquerque	0	1	1.13	10	0	0	8.0	3	1	1	2	5
Chris Beck	2	1	6.40	**57**	0	0	64.2	73	48	46	34	42
Rob Brantly	0	0	9.00	1	0	0	1.0	1	1	1	1	0
Aaron Bummer	1	3	4.50	30	0	0	22.0	13	11	11	15	17
Tyler Clippard	1	1	1.80	11	0	2	10.0	8	2	2	5	12
Dylan Covey	0	7	7.71	18	12	0	70.0	83	60	60	34	41
Tyler Danish	1	0	0.00	1	1	0	5.0	3	0	0	6	6
Danny Farquhar	2	0	4.40	15	0	0	14.1	11	7	7	6	12
Jace Fry	0	0	10.80	11	0	0	6.2	12	8	8	5	3
Carson Fulmer	3	1	3.86	7	5	0	23.1	16	10	10	13	19
Lucas Giolito	3	3	2.38	7	7	0	45.1	31	14	12	12	34
Brad Goldberg	0	0	8.25	11	0	0	12.0	14	11	11	14	3
Miguel González	**7**	10	4.31	22	22	0	133.2	145	72	64	47	85
Derek Holland	**7**	**14**	6.20	29	**26**	0	**135.0**	**156**	**106**	**93**	**75**	104
David Holmberg	2	4	4.68	37	7	0	57.2	63	37	30	34	33
Gregory Infante	2	1	3.13	52	0	0	54.2	45	20	19	20	49
Dan Jennings	3	1	3.45	48	0	0	44.1	35	20	17	19	38
Nate Jones	1	0	2.31	11	0	0	11.2	9	3	3	6	15
Tommy Kahnle	1	3	2.50	37	0	0	36.0	28	12	10	7	60
Reynaldo López	3	3	4.72	8	8	0	47.2	49	29	25	14	30
Juan Minaya	3	2	4.53	40	0	9	43.2	38	22	22	20	51
Mike Pelfrey	3	12	5.93	34	21	0	120.0	127	87	79	62	79
Jake Petricka	1	1	7.01	27	0	0	25.2	39	21	20	6	26
Zach Putnam	0	0	1.04	7	0	0	8.2	2	1	1	1	9
José Quintana	4	8	4.49	18	18	0	104.1	98	55	52	40	**109**
David Robertson	4	2	2.70	31	0	**13**	33.1	21	10	10	11	47
Carlos Rodon	2	5	4.15	12	12	0	69.1	64	35	32	31	76
James Shields	5	7	5.23	21	21	0	117.0	116	72	68	53	103
Anthony Swarzak	4	3	2.23	41	0	1	48.1	37	12	12	13	52
Chris Volstad	1	2	4.66	6	2	0	19.1	16	11	10	5	10
Michael Ynoa	1	0	5.90	22	0	0	29.0	28	22	19	22	23
**Team totals**	**67**	**95**	**4.78**	**162**	**162**	**25**	**1421.2**	**1384**	**820**	**755**	**632**	**1193**

== Farm system ==
Level	Team	League	Manager
AAA	Charlotte Knights	International League	Mark Grudzielanek
AA	Birmingham Barons	Southern League	Julio Vinas
A-Advanced	Winston-Salem Dash	Carolina League	Willie Harris
A	Kannapolis Intimidators	South Atlantic League	Justin Jirschele
Rookie	Great Falls Voyagers	Pioneer League	Tim Esmay
Rookie	AZL White Sox	Arizona League	Ryan Newman
Rookie	DSL White Sox	Dominican Summer League	
