= Dylan Covey =

American baseball player (born 1991)

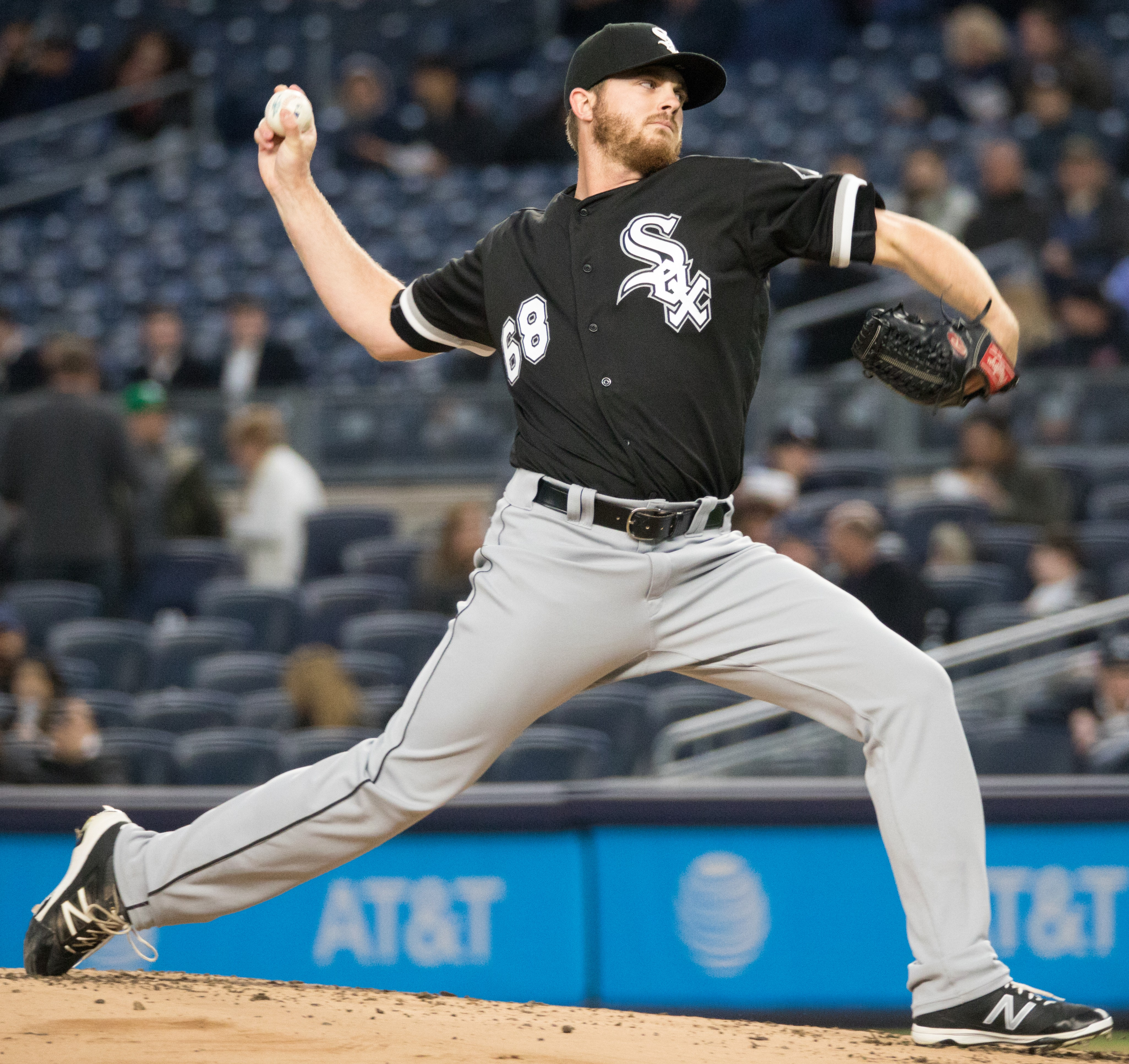
- Covey pitching for the Chicago White Sox in 2017

Free agent
- Pitcher
- Born: August 14, 1991 (age 35); Glendale, California, U.S.
- Bats: Right Throws: Right

Professional debut
- MLB: April 14, 2017, for the Chicago White Sox
- CPBL: August 31, 2021, for the Rakuten Monkeys

MLB statistics (through 2023 season)
- Win–loss record: 7–32
- Earned run average: 6.18
- Strikeouts: 214

CPBL statistics (through 2022 season)
- Win–loss record: 16–10
- Earned run average: 3.63
- Strikeouts: 138
- Stats at Baseball Reference

Teams
- Chicago White Sox (2017–2019); Boston Red Sox (2020); Rakuten Monkeys (2021–2022); Los Angeles Dodgers (2023); Philadelphia Phillies (2023)

Dylan Charles Covey (born August 14, 1991) is an American professional baseball pitcher who is a free agent. He has previously played in Major League Baseball (MLB) for the Chicago White Sox, Boston Red Sox, Los Angeles Dodgers, and Philadelphia Phillies, and in the Chinese Professional Baseball League (CPBL) for the Rakuten Monkeys.

Covey was selected by the Milwaukee Brewers in the first round of the 2010 MLB draft. However, a physical examination performed by the Brewers diagnosed Covey with Type I diabetes. He, instead, chose to enroll at the University of San Diego, 125 miles from his Pasadena, California, home, and played college baseball for the San Diego Toreros prior to being selected by the Oakland Athletics in the fourth round of the 2013 MLB draft.

The White Sox selected Covey in the Rule 5 draft after the 2016 season and he made his MLB debut with the White Sox in 2017. He played for the White Sox through 2019, for the Red Sox in 2020, the Monkeys in 2021 and 2022, and the Dodgers in 2023.

== Career ==
=== Amateur career ===
Covey attended Maranatha High School in Pasadena, California, where he played for the school's baseball team. He pitched to a 1.30 earned run average (ERA) and a .131 batting average against in his four years at Maranatha. As a senior, Covey had a 7–1 win–loss record, a 0.40 ERA, and 138 strikeouts in 70 2/3 innings pitched. However, he lost 35 pounds (16 kg) that year, and could not regain the weight.

The Milwaukee Brewers selected Covey in the first round, with the fourteenth overall selection, of the 2010 Major League Baseball draft. He indicated to the Brewers that he was likely to sign with them, but that he wanted a $2 million signing bonus. During his post-draft physical, Covey was diagnosed with Type I diabetes. He decided not to sign with the Brewers, as he needed time to adjust to having this condition. Covey's party was quoted as saying, "They [Milwaukee] knew they would have to do some special things for Dylan." He ended up turning down a $1.6 million signing bonus offer from Milwaukee.

Covey enrolled at the University of San Diego (USD), and he played college baseball for the San Diego Toreros baseball team. At USD, Covey was near his parents and doctors whom he trusted to help him manage his condition. As Covey regained weight, he struggled as a freshman, pitching to a 1–3 record, a 7.60 ERA, and almost as many walks (28) as strikeouts (29). He improved in his sophomore year, with a 6–3 record and 3.32 ERA, but with 43 walks and 50 strikeouts across 81 innings. In 2012, he played collegiate summer baseball with the Orleans Firebirds of the Cape Cod Baseball League. As a junior, Covey had a 5–4 record, and a 5.05 ERA.

=== Oakland Athletics ===
The Oakland Athletics selected Covey in the fourth round, with the 131st overall selection, of the 2013 MLB draft. He signed with the Athletics, receiving a $370,000 signing bonus. The Athletics assigned Covey to the Vermont Lake Monsters of the Class A-Short Season New York–Penn League, and after giving up no earned runs in 12 innings, promoted him to the Beloit Snappers of the Class A Midwest League where he finished the season, going 1–1 with a 4.75 ERA in 10 starts.

In 2014, Covey began the year with Beloit, before he was promoted to the Stockton Ports of the Class A-Advanced California League. In 26 games (25 starts) between the two teams, he was 7–14 with a 5.46 ERA. He pitched for Stockton in 2015, compiling an 8–9 record with a 3.59 ERA in 26 games started. Covey began the 2016 season with the Midland RockHounds of the Class AA Texas League, but suffered an oblique muscle strain in May and missed the remainder of the regular season. In six starts prior to his injury, he was 2–1 with a 1.84 ERA. The Athletics assigned Covey to the Mesa Solar Sox of the Arizona Fall League.

=== Chicago White Sox ===
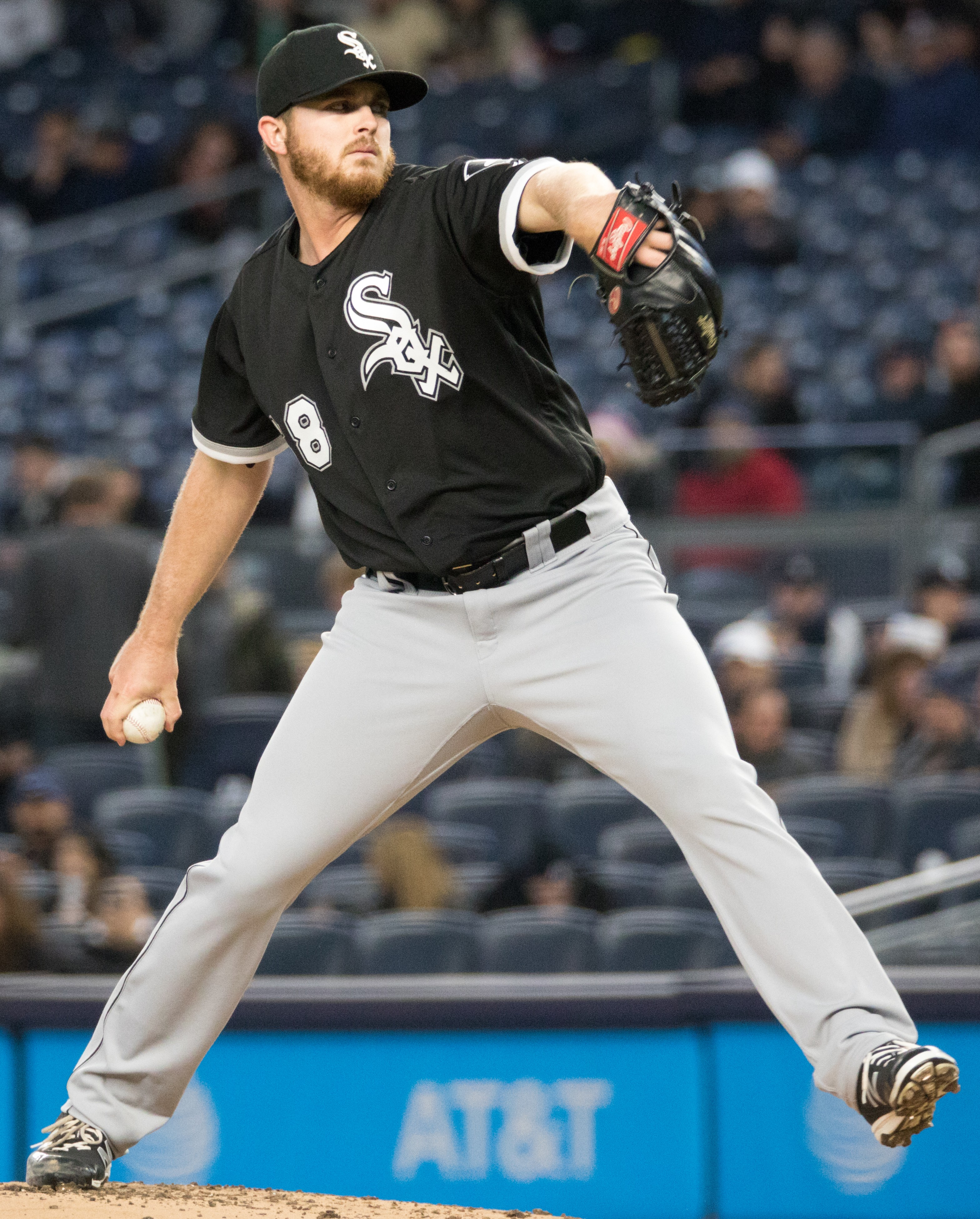
Covey pitching for the Chicago White Sox in 2017

On December 8, 2016, the Chicago White Sox selected Covey in the Rule 5 draft. Covey made the White Sox' Opening Day roster in 2017, and he made his major league debut on April 14. Aside from five rehab starts with the AZL White Sox and the Charlotte Knights, Covey spent half of 2017 with the White Sox, pitching to a 0–7 record and a 7.71 ERA in 18 games (12 starts).

Covey was outrighted to the minors and removed from the 40-man roster on February 18, 2018. He began the season with Charlotte. His contract was purchased on April 28 to start the second game of a doubleheader. He was optioned back to Charlotte the next day and recalled once again on May 19. Covey finished the 2018 season with a 5–14 record and 5.18 ERA in 27 MLB appearances (21 starts).

In 2019, Covey split time between Chicago and Triple-A Charlotte. He had a particularly difficult outing on July 28, allowing five runs without retiring a batter. In his 18 MLB outings (12 starts), he compiled a 1–8 record with a 7.98 ERA. Covey was designated for assignment by the White Sox on January 14, 2020, and outrighted on January 21. On January 22, Covey rejected an assignment to Triple-A Charlotte and became a free agent.

=== Tampa Bay Rays ===
On January 30, 2020, Covey signed a minor league deal with the Tampa Bay Rays. Though the 2020 minor league season was cancelled due to the COVID-19 pandemic, the Rays included Covey in their 60-player pool for the shortened season.

=== Boston Red Sox ===
On July 21, 2020, Covey was traded to the Boston Red Sox. He made his first appearance for the Red Sox on July 25, allowing two runs in two innings of relief against the Baltimore Orioles. He was optioned to Boston's alternate training site on July 26, recalled for a week during August, and recalled again on September 10. Overall with the 2020 Red Sox, Covey appeared in 8 games (all in relief), compiling an 0–0 record with 7.07 ERA and 11 strikeouts in 14 innings pitched. On October 28, Covey was outrighted off of the 40-man roster and assigned to Triple-A.

=== Rakuten Monkeys ===
On May 18, 2021, Covey signed with the Rakuten Monkeys of the Chinese Professional Baseball League in Taiwan. He started 10 games for the team down the stretch, logging a 3–4 record and 4.01 ERA with 38 strikeouts in 58.1 innings pitched.

On December 28, 2021, he re-signed with the team, agreeing to a contract for the 2022 season. In 2022, Covey started 23 games for the Monkeys, recording a 13–6 record and 3.47 ERA with 100 strikeouts in 140.0 innings pitched.

=== Los Angeles Dodgers ===
On January 27, 2023, Covey signed a minor league contract with the Los Angeles Dodgers organization. He began the season with the Triple-A Oklahoma City Dodgers, where he made seven appearances (six starts) and posted a 4.22 ERA with 28 strikeouts in 32 innings pitched. On May 17, Covey was called up to the majors. He appeared in one game, allowing two earned runs in four innings before being designated for assignment the following day.

=== Philadelphia Phillies ===
On May 20, 2023, Covey was claimed off waivers by the Philadelphia Phillies. In 28 appearances for the Phillies, he compiled a 3.69 ERA with 27 strikeouts across 39 innings pitched.

Covey dealt with shoulder tightness during spring training in 2024, and began the season on the injured list following the diagnosis of a right shoulder strain. He was transferred to the 60–day injured list on June 1. Covey was removed from the 40–man roster and sent outright to the Triple–A Lehigh Valley IronPigs on August 27. He elected free agency on October 10.

=== Atlanta Braves ===
On October 31, 2024, Covey signed a one-year, major league contract with the New York Mets. However, he was designated for assignment by the Mets on January 30, 2025 after the signing of Ryne Stanek. Covey cleared waivers and was sent outright to the Triple-A Syracuse Mets on February 5. He elected free agency the next day.

On February 11, 2025, Covey signed a minor league contract with the Atlanta Braves. He made six appearances for the Triple-A Gwinnett Stripers, recording a 1-1 record with four strikeouts and one save without allowing an earned run. Covey was released by the Braves organization on July 8.

== Personal life ==
Covey was home schooled until high school. He has two older brothers. Covey's father, Darrell, was selected by the New York Mets in the 29th round of the 1968 MLB draft out of Pasadena Junior College, but he did not sign or play professional baseball.

== See also ==
- Rule 5 draft results
