= Curt Hasler =

American baseball player & coach

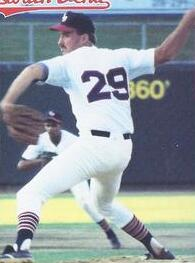

Chicago White Sox
- Pitcher \ Bullpen coach
- Born: December 29, 1964 (age 61); Honolulu, Hawaii, U.S.
- Bats: Right Throws: Right
- Stats at Baseball Reference

Teams
- Chicago White Sox (2017–2023)

Curtis Allan Hasler (born December 29, 1964) is an American professional baseball coach and former pitcher. He served as the bullpen coach for the Chicago White Sox of Major League Baseball from 2017 to 2023.

== Career ==
Hasler is a native of Honolulu who has spent his entire professional career in the White Sox organization. A 6 ft 7 in (2.01 m), 215 lb (98 kg) right-handed pitcher, he attended Bradley University, and played collegiate summer baseball for the Hyannis Mets in 1985. Hasler was selected by the White Sox in the 21st round of the 1987 Major League Baseball draft. He pitched for five seasons (1987–91) in the club's farm system, posting a win–loss record of 34–30 and an earned run average of 3.51 in 97 minor-league games and 5612/3 innings pitched. He appeared in 11 games at the Triple-A level in his final active season.

In 1992, he became a pitching coach at the Rookie and Class A levels in the White Sox' system, and continued in that role until he became roving minor league pitching coordinator from 2011 to 2016. The 2017 season marked his 30th year in the Chicago organization and his first in the Major Leagues as bullpen coach on the staff of Rick Renteria.

Preceded by Bobby Thigpen	Chicago White Sox bullpen coach 2017–	Succeeded by Incumbent
