= Jacob May =

American baseball player (born 1992)

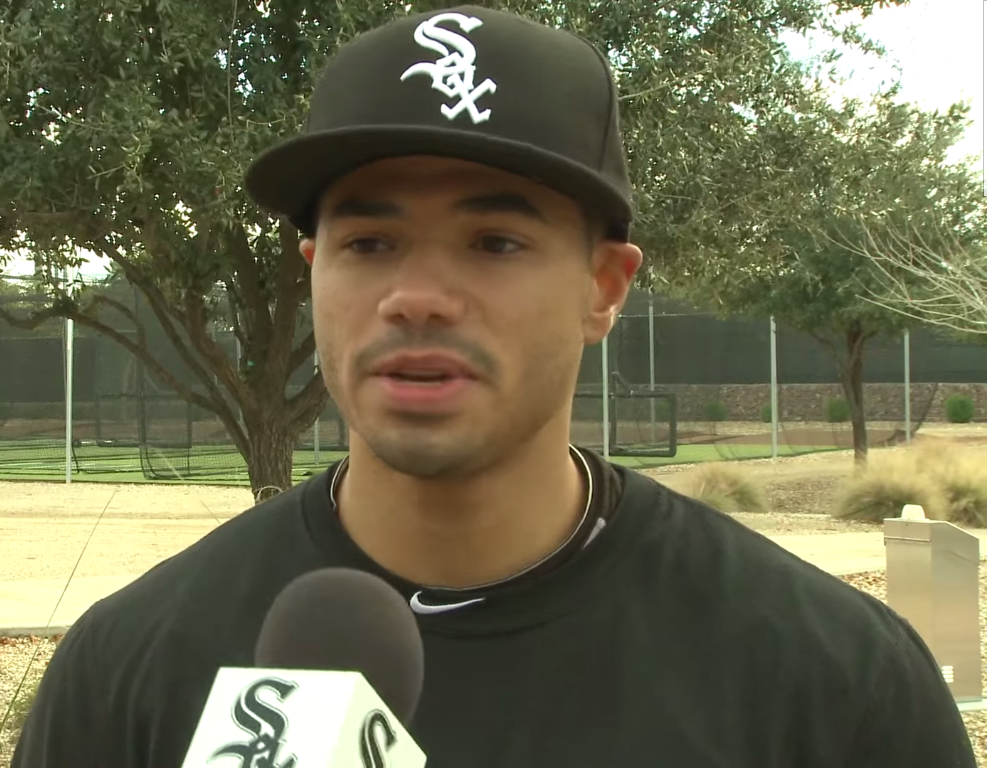
- May with the Chicago White Sox in 2016
- Outfielder
- Born: January 23, 1992 (age 34); Maitland, Florida, U.S.
- Batted: Switch Threw: Right

MLB debut
- April 4, 2017, for the Chicago White Sox

Last MLB appearance
- May 1, 2017, for the Chicago White Sox

MLB statistics
- Batting average: .056
- Home runs: 0
- Runs batted in: 3
- Stats at Baseball Reference

Teams
- Chicago White Sox (2017)
Medals
Men's baseball
Representing United States
WBSC Premier12
Silver medal – second place	2015 Tokyo	Team

Jacob Alexander May (born January 23, 1992) is an American former Major League Baseball (MLB) outfielder who played for the Chicago White Sox in 2017.

== Amateur career ==
The Cincinnati Reds selected May in the 39th round of the 2010 MLB draft out of Lakota West High School in West Chester, Ohio. He did not sign and enrolled at Coastal Carolina University, where he played college baseball for the Coastal Carolina Chanticleers.

In 2012, he played collegiate summer baseball with the Cotuit Kettleers of the Cape Cod Baseball League, and was named a league all-star.

== Professional career ==
The Chicago White Sox selected May in the third round of the 2013 MLB draft. He made his professional debut with the Great Falls Voyagers and was later promoted to the Kannapolis Intimidators. After the season, he played for the Sydney Blue Sox of the Australian Baseball League.

May played 2014 with the Winston-Salem Dash, 2015 with the Double-A Birmingham Barons and 2016 with the Triple-A Charlotte Knights. The White Sox added him to their 40-man roster after the 2016 season.

On March 28, 2017, May was named the White Sox' starting center fielder to open the season. However, he only appeared in 15 games for the team during the season, batting 2-for-36 with three RBIs and three walks. He played the majority of the year with Charlotte.

On January 11, 2018, May was designated for assignment in order to make room for newly acquired pitcher Miguel Gonzalez on the 40-man roster. He appeared in 81 games for Charlotte before he was released from the organization on July 28, 2018.

== Personal ==
May's grandfather, Lee May, played in MLB and his father, Lee May, Jr. played in the minor leagues. His great uncle Carlos May also played for the Chicago White Sox.
