= Alen Hanson =

Dominican baseball player (born 1992)

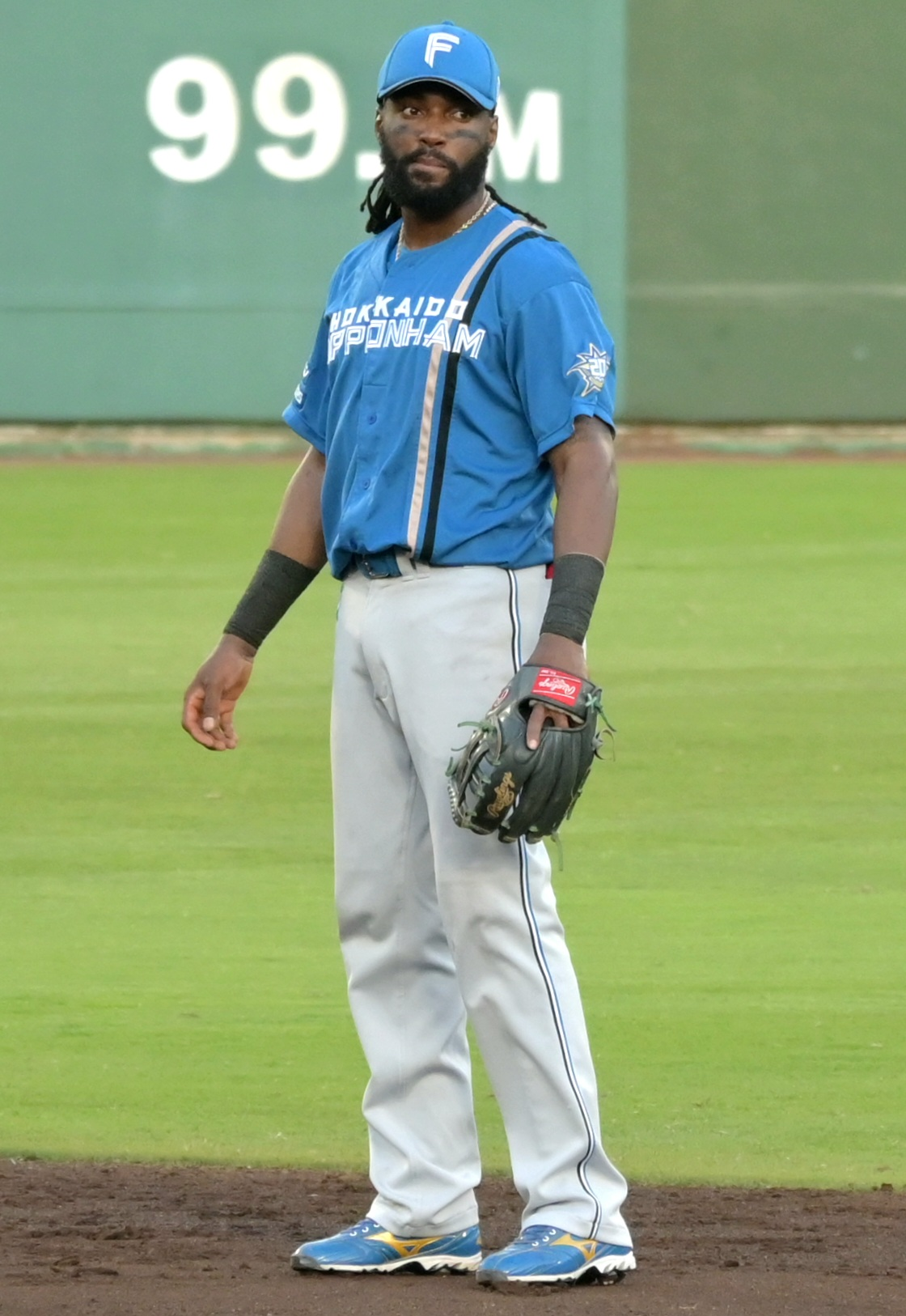
- Hanson with the Japan Hokkaido Nippon-Ham Fighters in 2023

Conspiradores de Querétaro – No. 7
- Second baseman / Outfielder
- Born: October 22, 1992 (age 34); La Romana, Dominican Republic
- Bats: Switch Throws: Right

Professional debut
- MLB: May 17, 2016, for the Pittsburgh Pirates
- NPB: May 16, 2023, for the Hokkaido Nippon-Ham Fighters

MLB statistics (through 2019 season)
- Batting average: .232
- Home runs: 12
- Runs batted in: 55

NPB statistics (through 2023 season)
- Batting average: .144
- Home runs: 4
- Runs batted in: 9
- Stats at Baseball Reference

Teams
- Pittsburgh Pirates (2016–2017); Chicago White Sox (2017); San Francisco Giants (2018); Toronto Blue Jays (2019); Hokkaido Nippon-Ham Fighters (2023)

Alen Rery Hanson Michel (born October 22, 1992) is a Dominican professional baseball infielder for the Conspiradores de Querétaro of the Mexican League. A second baseman and outfielder, Hanson made his Major League Baseball (MLB) debut with the Pittsburgh Pirates on May 17, 2016, and has also played in MLB for the Chicago White Sox, San Francisco Giants, and Toronto Blue Jays. He has additionally played in Nippon Professional Baseball (NPB) for the Hokkaido Nippon-Ham Fighters.

== Professional career ==
=== Pittsburgh Pirates ===
==== Minor leagues ====
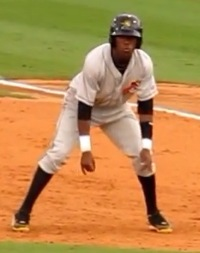
Hanson with the West Virginia Power in 2012

On July 14, 2009, the Pittsburgh Pirates signed Hanson as an international free agent for $90,000. In 2010, Hanson played his first year of rookie-level Minor League Baseball as a member of the Gulf Coast League Pirates. In the 68 games he played in 2010, Hanson hit .324 with 28 runs batted in (RBIs), seven triples, and 20 stolen bases. In 2011, Hanson again played for the GCL Pirates. In 52 games, Hanson hit .263 with 35 RBIs, seven triples, and 24 stolen bases. Hanson's seven triples led the Gulf Coast League in 2011.

In July 2012, Hanson was named the 40th-best prospect in baseball by Baseball America in their Midseason Top 50 Prospects List. Hanson spent the 2012 season with the Pirates' Class A affiliate, the West Virginia Power of the South Atlantic League. Hanson had a strong season for the Power. He played 124 games and hit .309 with 16 home runs, 62 RBIs, 13 triples, 39 stolen bases, 55 walks, and 99 runs scored. He was named an All-Star.

Prior to the 2013 season, Hanson was ranked as the 54th-best prospect in baseball by MLB.com, and the 61st-best prospect by Baseball America. Hanson began the 2013 season with the High-A Bradenton Marauders. In 92 games with the Marauders, Hanson hit .281 with seven home runs, 48 RBIs, and 24 stolen bases. On July 28, Hanson was promoted to the Pirates' Double-A affiliate, the Altoona Curve. In 35 games with the Curve during the 2013 season, Hanson hit .255 with 10 RBIs, 6 stolen bases, and just a single home run. Hanson was added to the Pirates' 40-man roster on November 20, 2013.

Hanson spent the entire 2014 season with the Curve. In 118 games, he hit .280 with 11 home runs, 64 RBIs, 12 triples, and 25 stolen bases. In August 2014, the Pirates announced that they would be moving Hanson, primarily a shortstop, to second base. At the time of the announcement, Hanson had committed 61 errors in 227 games in 2013 and 2014. Larry Broadway, the Pirates' Director of Minor League Operations, indicated that the move was to increase Hanson's versatility, saying, "we still believe he can play shortstop and believe he will play shortstop for us at some point in the future. Adding this dimension to his game will give him additional opportunity to impact our organization at the Major League level when he is ready."

Hanson spent the entire 2015 season with the Pirates' Triple-A affiliate, the Indianapolis Indians. Hanson played 117 games for the Indians and hit .263 with six home runs, 43 RBIs, and 12 triples. Hanson also stole 35 bases, tying his personal best from 2012.

Entering the 2016 season, MLB.com ranked Hanson as the 10th-best prospect in the Pirates organization, and the 6th-best prospect amongst second basemen. Hanson began the 2016 season with the Indianapolis Indians.

==== Major leagues ====
On May 16, 2016, the Pirates promoted Hanson to the major league club after Starling Marte went on paternity leave. Pirates manager Clint Hurdle said that Hanson would return to the minors when Marte returned. Hurdle noted that Hanson would likely be recalled again later in the season, but still had yet to prove himself in Triple-A. Hanson said that, when he called his mother to tell her the news, she accidentally hung up and celebrated, while Hanson waited in silence for nearly 10 minutes.

On May 17, Hanson made his big league debut, striking out in a pinch-hit appearance.

On May 18, Hanson recorded his first MLB hit. Entering the game in the 5th inning as a pinch hitter, Hanson reached base on an infield hit. Hanson said after the game that he planned to send the ball to his home in the Dominican Republic as a present for his mother.

Hanson, out of minor league options, opened the 2017 season on the Pirates MLB roster. He was designated for assignment on June 2.

=== Chicago White Sox ===
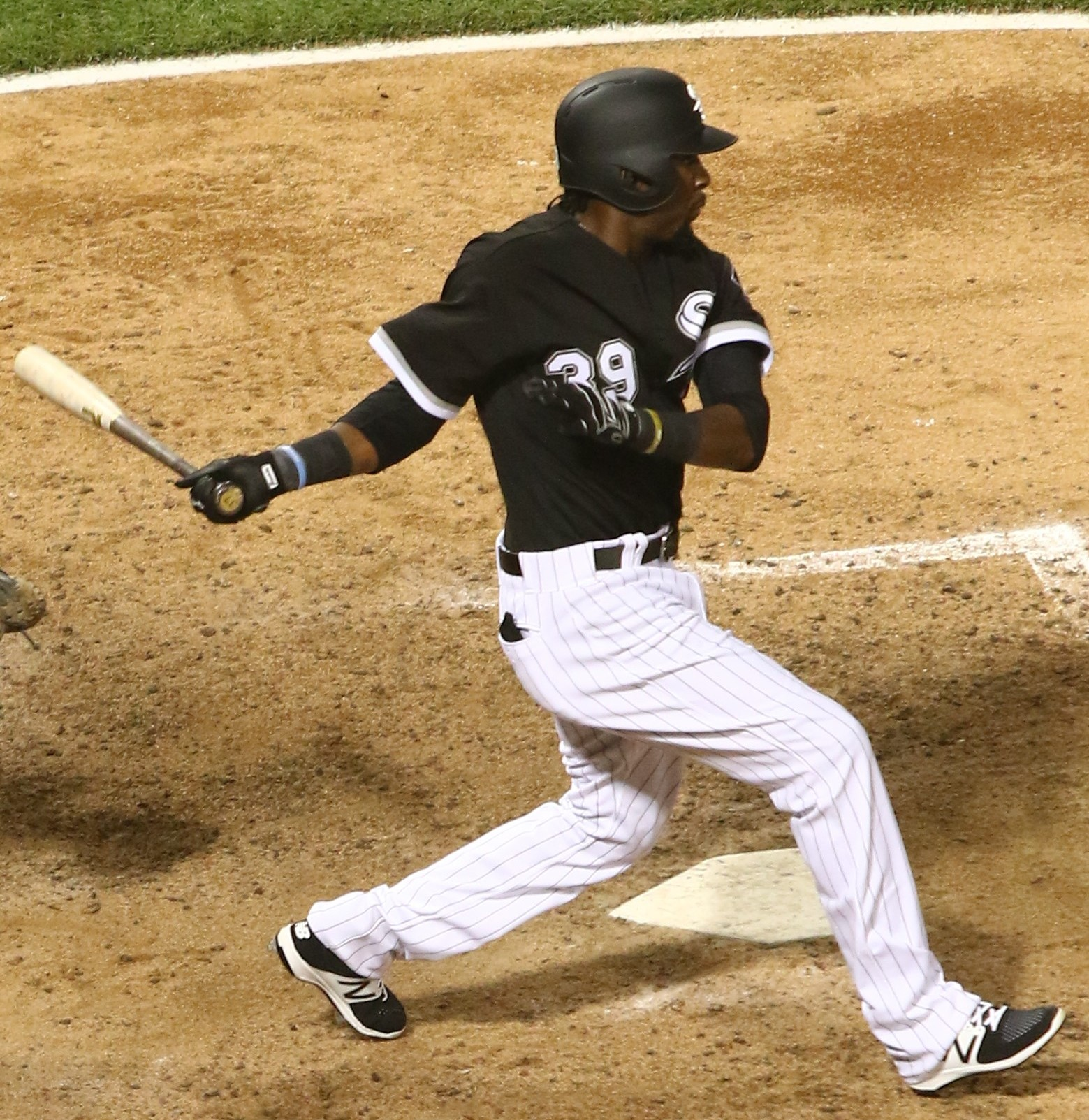
Hanson with the White Sox in 2017.

On June 9, 2017, the Chicago White Sox claimed Hanson off waivers. Hanson was added to the team's 25-man roster the following day. On December 1, 2017, Hanson was non-tendered and became a free agent.

=== San Francisco Giants ===
Hanson signed a minor league contract with the San Francisco Giants on December 22, 2017, receiving a non-roster invitation to spring training. He began the 2018 season with the Sacramento River Cats of the Triple–A Pacific Coast League. After a hand injury to starting second baseman Joe Panik, Hanson was promoted by the Giants on April 28 after hitting .403 in 62 at bats for the River Cats with five doubles and three home runs.

On March 28, 2019, Hanson was designated for assignment after failing to make the Opening Day roster.

=== Toronto Blue Jays ===
On April 2, 2019, the Giants traded Hanson, Derek Law, and Juan De Paula to the Toronto Blue Jays for Kevin Pillar. Hanson was called up by the Blue Jays on April 4. He was designated for assignment on May 3. He was outrighted to the Triple-A Buffalo Bisons on May 7. Hanson was released by the organization on August 3, 2019. He ended his stint with Toronto hitting only .163 in 18 games.

=== Seattle Mariners ===
On January 23, 2020, Hanson signed a minor league deal with the Seattle Mariners that included an invitation to spring training. He was released by the Mariners organization on June 25, 2020. On June 17, 2021, Hanson re-signed with the Mariners on a new minor league contract (Tacoma Rainiers). He elected free agency on November 7, 2021.

=== Ibaraki Astro Planets ===
In March 2023, Hanson signed with the Ibaraki Astro Planets of Japan's Baseball Challenge League for the 2023 season.

=== Hokkaido Nippon-Ham Fighters ===
On May 8, 2023, Hanson signed with the Hokkaido Nippon-Ham Fighters of Nippon Professional Baseball (NPB). In 39 games for the Fighters, he batted .144/.188/.311 with four home runs, nine RBI, and two stolen bases. Hanson became a free agent following the 2023 season.

=== Conspiradores de Querétaro ===
On February 22, 2024, Hanson signed with the Conspiradores de Querétaro of the Mexican League. In 80 appearances for Querétaro, he hit .335/.375/.552 with 16 home runs, 49 RBI, and eight stolen bases.

Hanson made 79 appearances for Querétaro during the 2025 season, batting .355/.438/.625 with 18 home runs, 58 RBI, and six stolen bases.

== International career ==
In 2020–2021 and 2021–2022 Hanson played winter ball with the Toros del Este in the Dominican Professional Baseball League.

In 2020, Hanson was selected to the French national baseball team roster for the 2021 World Baseball Classic qualifier in Arizona. Though born in the Dominican Republic, he is eligible to play for Team France because of his French ancestry.
