= Willy García =

Dominican baseball player (born 1992)

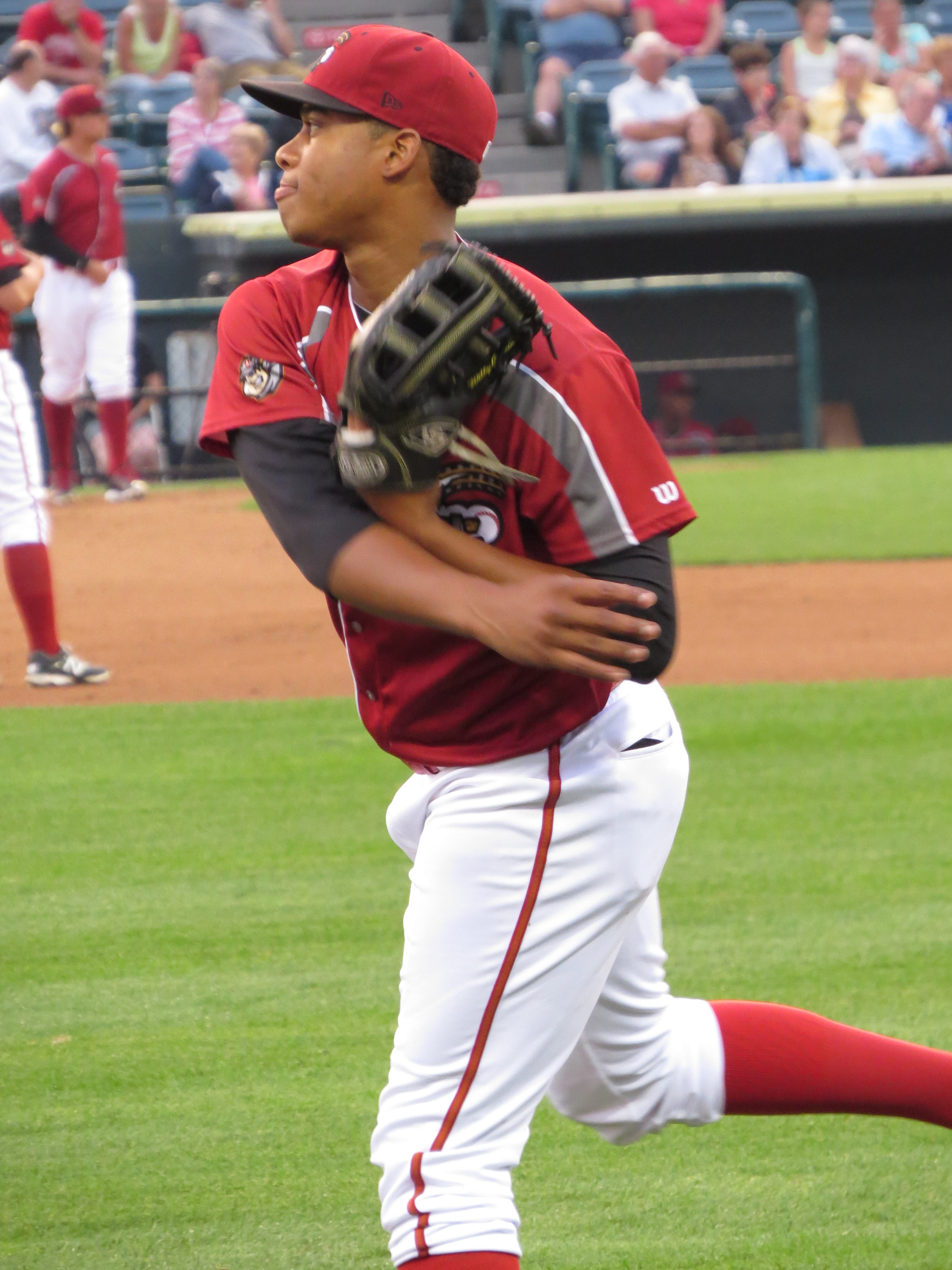
- García with the Altoona Curve in 2014
- Outfielder
- Born: September 4, 1992 (age 34); Santo Domingo, Dominican Republic
- Batted: Right Threw: Right

MLB debut
- April 14, 2017, for the Chicago White Sox

Last MLB appearance
- September 27, 2017, for the Chicago White Sox

MLB statistics
- Batting average: .238
- Home runs: 2
- Runs batted in: 12
- Stats at Baseball Reference

Teams
- Chicago White Sox (2017)

Willy Camilo García Archivol (born September 4, 1992) is a Dominican former professional baseball outfielder. He played in Major League Baseball (MLB) for the Chicago White Sox.

== Career ==
=== Pittsburgh Pirates ===
García signed with the Pittsburgh Pirates as an international free agent on May 18, 2010. He made his professional debut that season with the Dominican Summer League Pirates, batting .250/.333/.333 in 51 games. In 2011, he split the season between the Gulf Coast League Pirates and the Low–A State College Spikes, accumulating a .266/.322/.440 slash line with five home runs and 35 RBI. The next year he played for the Single–A West Virginia Power and posted a .240/.286/.403 batting line with career-highs in home runs (18) and RBI (77). García spent the 2013 season with the High–A Bradenton Marauders, batting .256/.294/.437 with 16 home runs and 60 RBI. On June 25, 2013, he set the Marauders team record for hits in a game with six. García played the 2014 season with the Double–A Altoona Curve, posting a 271/.311/.478 slash line with 18 home runs and 63 RBI.

On November 20, 2014, the Pirates added García to their 40-man roster to protect him from the Rule 5 draft. He spent the entire 2015 season in the minors, splitting time with the Triple–A Indianapolis Indians and Altoona, posting a .275/.314/.431 batting line with 15 home runs and 67 RBI between the two teams. He spent the 2016 season in Indianapolis, hitting .245/.293/.366 with six home runs and 43 RBI. On December 31, 2016, García was designated for assignment by the Pirates.

=== Chicago White Sox ===
García was claimed off waivers by the Chicago White Sox on January 6, 2017. The White Sox promoted him to the major leagues on April 14 and he made his MLB debut that day. In 44 games in his rookie season with Chicago, García slashed .238/.305/.400 with two home runs and 12 RBI. On March 9, 2018, he was released by the White Sox organization.

=== Winnipeg Goldeyes ===
On February 11, 2019, García signed with the Winnipeg Goldeyes of the independent American Association. Before the 2019 season, he was selected for Dominican Republic national baseball team at the 2019 Pan American Games Qualifier, and he later played at the 2019 Pan American Games. In 86 games for Winnipeg, García slashed .310/.376/.548 with 17 home runs and 73 RBI. García did not play in a professional game in 2020.

=== Schaumburg Boomers ===
On March 24, 2021, García was traded to the Schaumburg Boomers of the Frontier League in exchange for a player to be named later. In eight appearances for Schaumburg, García slashed .138/.265/.276 with one home run and three RBI.

=== Tri-City ValleyCats ===
On June 18, 2021, García was traded to the Tri-City ValleyCats of the Frontier League. He played in 58 games for the team down the stretch, slashing .297/.356/.455 with six home runs and 26 RBI.

In 2022, García appeared in 34 games for the ValleyCats, hitting .305/.352/.496 with six home runs and 24 RBI.

=== New Jersey Jackals ===
On July 4, 2022, García was traded to the High Point Rockers of the Atlantic League of Professional Baseball. García did not appear in a game for High Point and became a free agent after the season.

On February 21, 2023, García signed with the New Jersey Jackals of the Frontier League. He was released on February 14, 2024, after not appearing in a game during the 2023 season.

=== Charleston Dirty Birds ===
On February 17, 2024, Garcia signed with the Charleston Dirty Birds of the Atlantic League of Professional Baseball. In 22 games for the Dirty Birds, he slashed .169/.242/.289 with two home runs and 12 RBI. García was released by Charleston on August 17.

=== Barrie Baycats ===
On November 5, 2024, García signed with the Barrie Baycats of the Intercounty Baseball League. He made 32 appearances for Barrie during the 2025 campaign, slashing .292/.360/.467 with four home runs, 18 RBI, and two stolen bases. García was released by the Baycats on July 27, 2026.

On August 8, 2026, García announced his retirement from professional baseball.
