= Tyler Saladino =

American baseball player (born 1989)

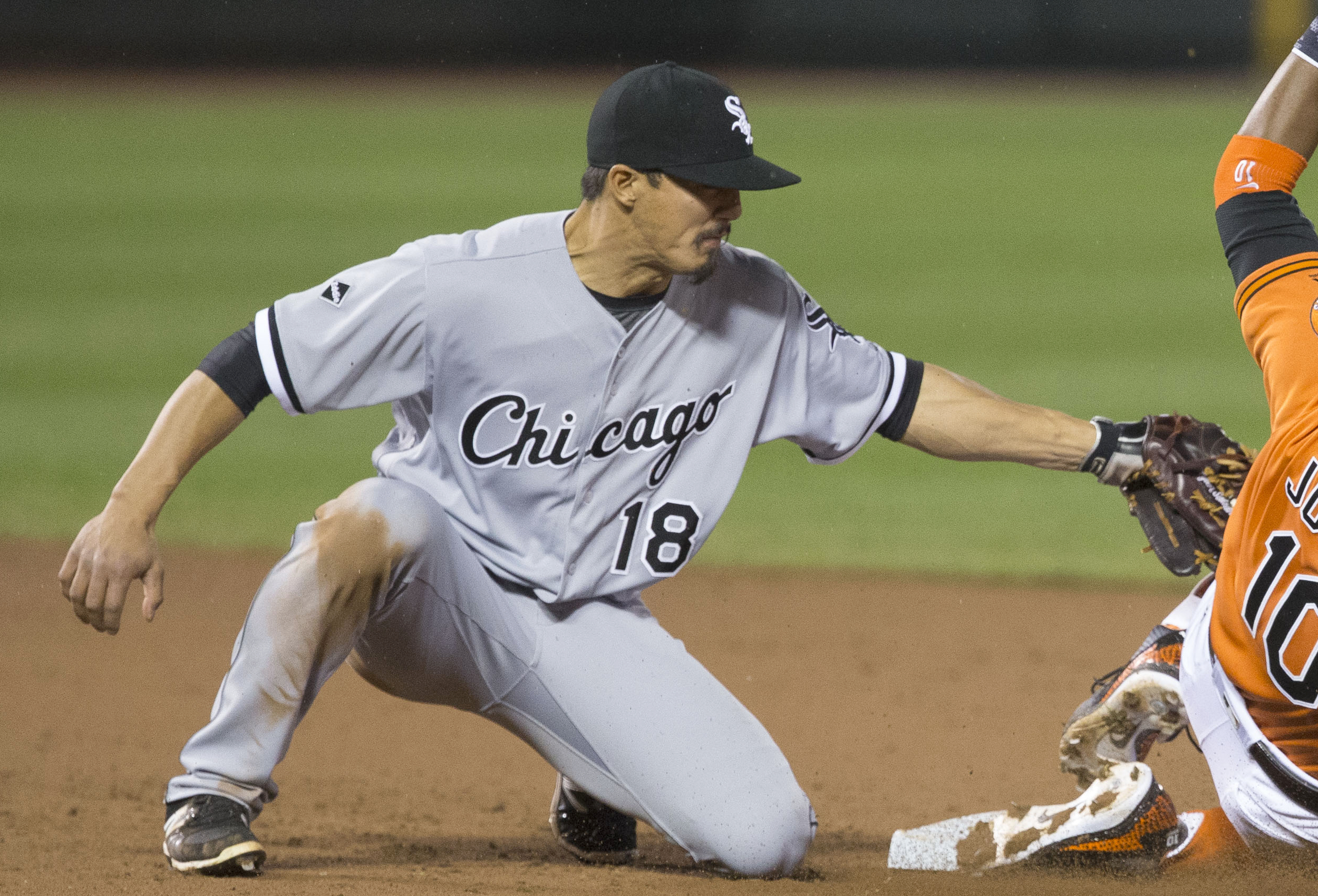
- Saladino with the Chicago White Sox
- Third baseman / Shortstop
- Born: July 20, 1989 (age 37); San Diego, California, U.S.
- Batted: Right Threw: Right

Professional debut
- MLB: July 10, 2015, for the Chicago White Sox
- KBO: May 5, 2020, for the Samsung Lions

Last appearance
- MLB: July 30, 2019, for the Milwaukee Brewers
- KBO: July 15, 2020, for the Samsung Lions

MLB statistics
- Batting average: .226
- Home runs: 19
- Runs batted in: 92

KBO statistics
- Batting average: .280
- Home runs: 6
- Runs batted in: 27
- Stats at Baseball Reference

Teams
- Chicago White Sox (2015–2018); Milwaukee Brewers (2018–2019); Samsung Lions (2020)

Tyler Artolo Saladino (born July 20, 1989) is an American former professional baseball infielder. He played in Major League Baseball (MLB) for the Chicago White Sox and Milwaukee Brewers, and in the KBO League for the Samsung Lions.

== Amateur career ==
Born and raised in San Diego, California, Saladino attended University City High School, where he was a standout in baseball and held a 3.1 GPA. Saladino then attended Palomar College a junior college in San Marcos, California, before transferring to Oral Roberts University in Tulsa, Oklahoma. In his two years at Palomar as a shortstop and third baseman, Saladino hit .399 and .616 in conference play. During his time at Palomar, Saladino was drafted by the Houston Astros in the 36th round of the 2008 draft, but turned it down to continue with college at Oral Robert’s University.

== Professional career ==
=== Chicago White Sox ===
Saladino was drafted out of Oral Roberts University by the Chicago White Sox in the seventh round of the 2010 Major League Baseball draft. In August 2014, he had Tommy John surgery. The White Sox added him to their 40-man roster on November 20, 2014, in order to protect him from the Rule 5 draft.

On July 10, 2015, Saladino was promoted to the major leagues for the first time, and made his major league debut the same day. He made 68 appearances for Chicago during his rookie campaign, hitting .225/.267/.335 with four home runs, 20 RBI, and eight stolen bases.

Saladino made 93 appearances for the White Sox during the 2016 season, slashing .282/.315/.409 with eight home runs, 38 RBI, and 11 stolen bases. He played in 79 contests for Chicago in 2017, batting .178/.254/.229 with 10 RBI and five stolen bases.

Saladino played in six games for the White Sox in 2018, going 2-for-8 (.250).

=== Milwaukee Brewers ===
On April 19, 2018, Saladino was traded to the Milwaukee Brewers in exchange for cash considerations. He was subsequently optioned to the Triple-A Colorado Springs Sky Sox. Saladino played in 52 games for Milwaukee over the course of the year, hitting .246/.302/.398 with five home runs, 16 RBI, and two stolen bases.

Saladino made 28 appearances for the Brewers in 2019, slashing .123/.197/.215 with two home runs, eight RBI, and two stolen bases. Saladino was non-tendered and became a free agent on December 2, 2019.

=== Samsung Lions ===
On December 24, 2019, Saladino signed with the Samsung Lions of the KBO League. He made 44 appearances for Samsung in 2020, hitting .280/.411/.477 with six home runs, 27 RBI, and six stolen bases before a back injury sidelined him. Saladino was waived by the Lions on July 29, 2020, and was replaced by Daniel Palka.

== Personal life ==
Saladino is of Filipino and Japanese descent.
