= Rick Renteria =

American baseball player and manager (born 1961)

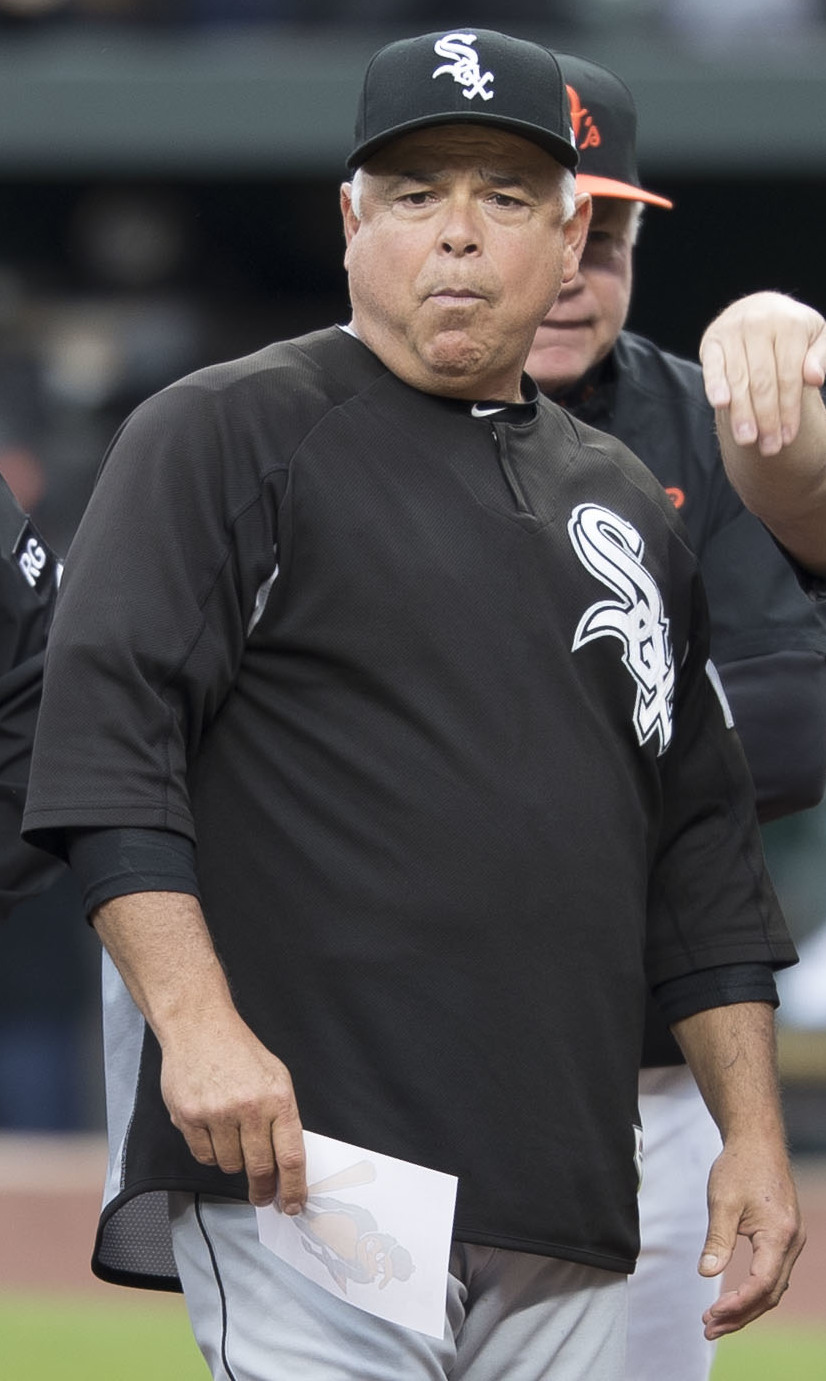
- Renteria in 2017
- Infielder / Manager
- Born: December 25, 1961 (age 64); Los Angeles, California, U.S.
- Batted: Right Threw: Right

MLB debut
- September 14, 1986, for the Pittsburgh Pirates

Last MLB appearance
- August 11, 1994, for the Florida Marlins

MLB statistics
- Batting average: .237
- Home runs: 4
- Runs batted in: 41
- Managerial record: 309–398
- Winning %: .437
- Stats at Baseball Reference

Teams
- As player: Pittsburgh Pirates (1986); Seattle Mariners (1987–1988); Florida Marlins (1993–1994); As manager: Chicago Cubs (2014); Chicago White Sox (2017–2020); As coach: San Diego Padres (2008–2013); Chicago White Sox (2016)

Richard Avina Renteria (born December 25, 1961) is a Mexican-American former professional baseball infielder and former manager of the Chicago Cubs and Chicago White Sox of Major League Baseball (MLB). Renteria played in parts of five seasons between 1986 and 1994 with the Pittsburgh Pirates, Seattle Mariners, and Florida Marlins. He then coached and managed in the Marlins organization until 2001, and in the San Diego Padres organization until 2013. He was the manager of the Chicago Cubs in 2014. Renteria was also the bench coach for the Chicago White Sox in 2016.

== Playing career ==
After playing for South Gate High School in South Gate, California, Renteria was drafted by the Pittsburgh Pirates with the 20th overall pick in the 1980 Major League Baseball draft. He made his Major League debut for the Pirates on September 14, 1986. That December he was traded to the Seattle Mariners, and played for them for the 1987 and 1988 seasons. Renteria spent 1989 playing for the Mariners Minor League Baseball affiliate the Calgary Cannons, and the 1990 and 1991 seasons with the Mexican League's Jalisco Charros.

For 1993 and 1994, he returned to the majors, playing for the Florida Marlins. While with the Marlins, he was nicknamed "The Secret Weapon" for his versatility on the field and his timely pinch hitting. In his five Major League seasons, he played in 184 games and had 422 at bats and a .237 batting average.

== Coaching career ==
After his playing career, Renteria has remained in baseball. His first minor league managerial job was in 1998 with the Brevard County Manatees in the Marlins organization. He continued to manage in the Marlins system until 2001. In 2003, he was named the hitting coach for the Lake Elsinore Storm in the Padres organization, and in 2004 he became the Storm's manager. After three seasons with the Storm, in 2007 he was moved up to the Triple-A Portland Beavers. He was promoted to a major league coaching job in 2008.

Renteria moved to being the Padres bench coach for 2011. He also managed the Mexico national baseball team in the 2013 World Baseball Classic. On November 7, 2013, Renteria was hired as the manager of the Chicago Cubs. After one season on the job, he was terminated on October 31, 2014, one week after his Cubs successor Joe Maddon opted out of his contract with the Tampa Bay Rays.

For the 2016 season, Renteria was hired by the Chicago White Sox to serve as their bench coach.

For the 2017 season, Renteria replaced White Sox manager Robin Ventura. Renteria was the second manager in Chicago baseball history, after Johnny Evers, to manage both the city's franchises. In 2017, he was ejected seven times, more than any other manager in the major leagues. In 2020, he took the White Sox to the playoffs for the first time since 2008. They went off to a 18-12 midway point in the COVID-affected season of 60 games; despite being in the lead for the division, they would fade down the stretch, which included losing eight of their last ten games. A 2-8 record against Cleveland meant that not only did they finish a game behind Minnesota for the division, it also meant that the White Sox finished in third place and thus were relegated to the first wild card spot. They played in the Wild Card Series against the AL West champion Oakland Athletics. The White Sox won Game 1 but failed to win either of the next two and were thus eliminated. On October 12, the White Sox announced that Renteria would not return as manager, ending his tenure with the team with one year remaining on his contract. His overall record in four seasons with the Sox was 236-309.

== Managerial record ==
As of September 27, 2020

| Team | Year | Regular season | | | | | Postseason | | | |
| Team | Year | Games | Won | Lost | Win % | Finish | Won | Lost | Win % | Result |
|---|---|---|---|---|---|---|---|---|---|---|
| CHC | 2014 | 162 | 73 | 89 | .451 | 5th in NL Central | – | – | | — |
| CHC Total | | 162 | 73 | 89 | .451 | | 0 | 0 | | |
| CWS | 2017 | 162 | 67 | 95 | .414 | 4th in AL Central | – | – | – | – |
| CWS | 2018 | 162 | 62 | 100 | .383 | 4th in AL Central | – | – | – | – |
| CWS | 2019 | 161 | 72 | 89 | .447 | 3rd in AL Central | – | – | – | – |
| CWS | 2020 | 60 | 35 | 25 | .583 | 3rd in AL Central | 1 | 2 | .333 | Lost ALWC (OAK) |
| CWS Total | | 545 | 236 | 309 | .433 | | 1 | 2 | .333 | |
| Total | | 703 | 309 | 398 | .437 | | 1 | 2 | .333 | |

Sporting positions
| Preceded by Mark Parent | Chicago White Sox bench coach 2016 | Succeeded by Joe McEwing |
