= Gregory Infante =

Venezuelan baseball player (born 1987)

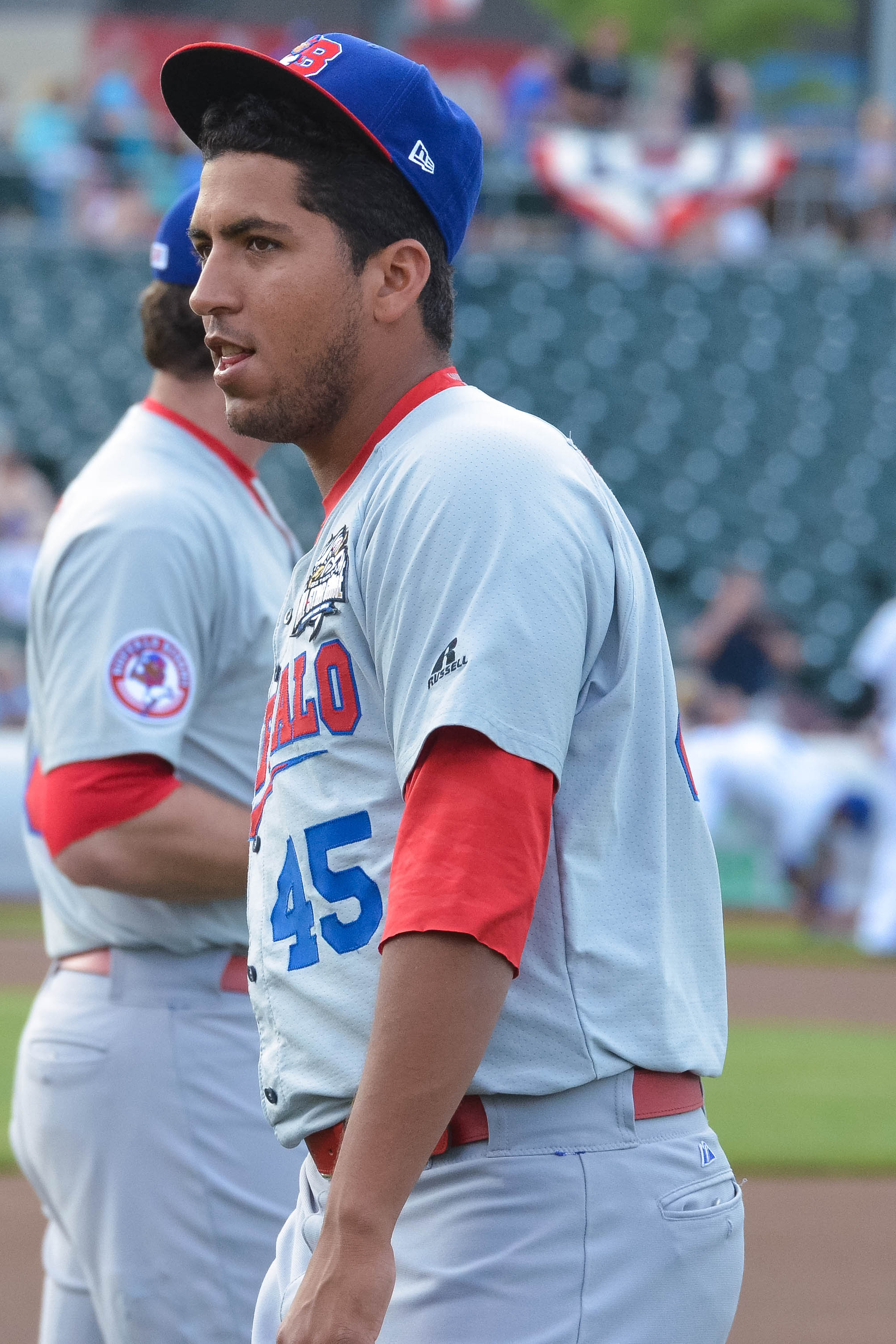
- Infante at the 2015 Triple-A All-Star Game

Centauros de La Guaira – No. 45
- Pitcher
- Born: July 10, 1987 (age 39); Caracas, Venezuela
- Batted: Right Threw: Right

MLB debut
- September 7, 2010, for the Chicago White Sox

Last MLB appearance
- April 27, 2018, for the Chicago White Sox

MLB statistics
- Win–loss record: 3–2
- Earned run average: 3.56
- Strikeouts: 60
- Stats at Baseball Reference

Teams
- Chicago White Sox (2010, 2017–2018)

Gregory Alexander Infante (born July 10, 1987) is a Venezuelan professional baseball pitcher for the Centauros de La Guaira of the Venezuelan Major League. He played in Major League Baseball (MLB) for the Chicago White Sox.

== Professional career ==
=== Chicago White Sox ===
Infante was signed by the Chicago White Sox as an international free agent in 2006. He was called up to the majors for the first time on September 1, 2010 and made his Major League debut in relief against the Detroit Tigers on September 7, 2010. In five games with the White Sox, he pitched 4 2/3 scoreless innings, allowing only 2 hits. Infante was released on August 30, 2012.

=== Los Angeles Dodgers ===
He signed with the Los Angeles Dodgers as a minor league free agent in November 2012 and was assigned to the Double-A Chattanooga Lookouts. He made 27 relief appearances with the Lookouts and was 1–1 with a 3.35 ERA. He was then promoted to Triple-A Albuquerque, where he made one appearance and allowed 3 runs in 2 innings. He was released on July 9, 2012.

=== Toronto Blue Jays ===
Infante signed a minor league deal with the Toronto Blue Jays in December 2013. He spent time with the Double-A New Hampshire Fisher Cats, and Triple-A Buffalo Bisons in 2014.

Infante signed another minor league deal with the Blue Jays on October 29, 2014, which included an invitation to spring training.

=== Philadelphia Phillies ===
On December 14, 2015, Infante signed a minor league contract with the Philadelphia Phillies with an invitation to spring training. He made 39 appearances split between the Double–A Reading Fightin Phils and Triple–A Lehigh Valley IronPigs, accumulating a 6–3 record and 5.11 ERA with 65 strikeouts across 61 2/3 innings of work. Infante elected free agency following the season on November 7, 2016.

=== Chicago White Sox (second stint) ===
On March 25, 2017, Infante signed a minor league contract to return to the Chicago White Sox organization. On May 15, the White Sox selected Infante's contract, adding him to their active roster. He made 52 appearances for Chicago and posted a 3.13 ERA with 49 strikeouts in 54 2/3 innings pitched.

In 2018, Infante spent most of the year in the minor leagues and posted an 8.00 ERA in 10 big league games. On June 15, 2018, he was removed from the 40–man roster and sent outright to the Triple–A Charlotte Knights. Infante elected free agency following the season on November 2.

=== Baltimore Orioles ===
On January 7, 2019, Infante signed a minor league deal with the Baltimore Orioles. He was released by the Orioles organization on March 31.

=== Rieleros de Aguascalientes ===
On February 8, 2020, Infante signed with the Rieleros de Aguascalientes of the Mexican League. Infante did not play in a game in 2020 due to the cancellation of the Mexican League season because of the COVID-19 pandemic. On February 25, 2021, Infante was released.

=== Retirement ===
On September 5, 2023, Infante announced his retirement via Instagram to start a youth baseball program in Caracas.

=== Delfines de La Guaira ===
In 2025, Infante signed with the Delfines de La Guaira of the Venezuelan Major League.

=== Centauros de La Guaira ===
In May 2026, Infante joined the Centauros de La Guaira of the Venezuelan Major League.

== See also ==
- List of Major League Baseball players from Venezuela
