= Miguel González (pitcher) =

Mexican baseball player (born 1984)

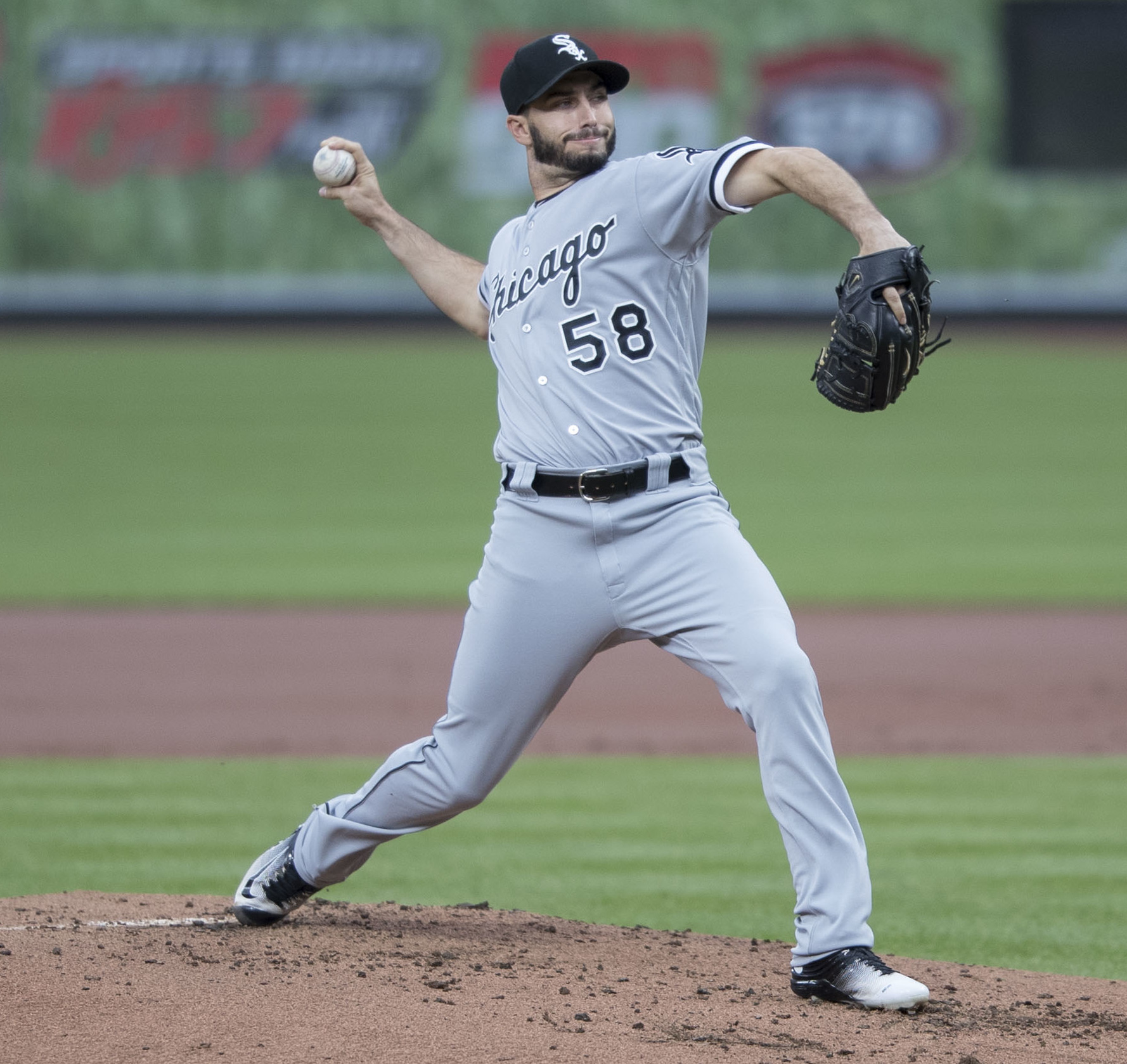
- González with the 2017 Chicago White Sox
- Pitcher
- Born: May 27, 1984 (age 41); Guadalajara, Jalisco, Mexico
- Batted: Right Threw: Right

MLB debut
- May 29, 2012, for the Baltimore Orioles

Last MLB appearance
- April 17, 2018, for the Chicago White Sox

MLB statistics
- Win–loss record: 52–57
- Earned run average: 4.06
- Strikeouts: 617
- Stats at Baseball Reference

Teams
- Baltimore Orioles (2012–2015); Chicago White Sox (2016–2017); Texas Rangers (2017); Chicago White Sox (2018)

Miguel Ángel González Martínez (born May 27, 1984), also known by his nickname El Mariachi, is a Mexican former professional baseball pitcher. He played in Major League Baseball (MLB) from 2012 to 2018 for the Baltimore Orioles, Chicago White Sox, and Texas Rangers. He played college baseball at Los Angeles Mission College.

== Early life ==
González was born in Mexico but moved with his family to San Fernando, California at four years old. He grew up a fan of the Los Angeles Dodgers. González attended San Fernando High School and Los Angeles Mission College.

== Career ==
=== Los Angeles Angels of Anaheim ===
González was originally signed by the Los Angeles Angels of Anaheim as an amateur free agent in 2005. The following two years, he earned a number of honors with the Arkansas Travelers (Texas League/Double-A).

=== Boston Red Sox ===
He was selected by Boston in the 2008 Rule 5 draft. Out during the regular season while recovering from a knee injury, he made a comeback with the Venados de Mazatlán of the Mexican Pacific League.

In 2009, González underwent Tommy John surgery and missed the entire season. He was outrighted to Pawtucket in November 2009.

=== Baltimore Orioles ===
After two seasons in the Red Sox minor league system, González signed a minor league deal with the Orioles in March 2012. He would start at Triple-A. He said that he signed to play with fellow Mexican players Dennys Reyes, Luis Ayala and Óscar Villarreal, as well as the fact that the Orioles gave him the opportunity to improve his skills.

Gonzalez made his first major league start on July 6, 2012, against the Los Angeles Angels and earned the win, limiting the Angels to one run and three hits over seven innings. The Orioles won the game 3–2. In the game, González honored his former teammate Nick Adenhart, who died in 2009, by wearing a glove given to him by Adenhart when they were teammates in 2007 with the Arkansas Travelers. For the 2012 regular season he went 9–4 with a 3.25 ERA in 14 starts. González also started Game 3 of the 2012 American League Division Series against the New York Yankees, departing the game with a 2-1 lead but no-decisioned when the Yankees tied the game in the ninth inning and won it in the twelfth.

On May 9, 2013, González was placed on the 15-day disabled list with an unhealed blister on his throwing thumb; at the time he had a record of 2-2 in six starts with an ERA of 4.58. González pitched in 30 games in 2013, making 28 starts. He pitched to a 3.78 ERA in 171 1/3 innings, striking out 120 batters. He earned a record of 11-8 on the year.

On September 3, 2014, González pitched the first complete game and shutout of his career against the Cincinnati Reds. He finished the season with a 10-9 record in 27 games (26 starts), pitching to an ERA 3.23 and WHIP of 1.30. He struck out 111 batters and pitched to a 122 ERA+. González made one start in the ALCS against the Royals, going 5 2/3 innings while allowing two runs (one earned). He took the loss in game 4, ultimately ending the Orioles season.

González struck out a career-high 10 batters on April 14, 2015. González struggled with injuries throughout 2015, and finished with the worst year of his career. He went 9-12 in 26 starts and finished with a 4.91 ERA.

=== Chicago White Sox ===
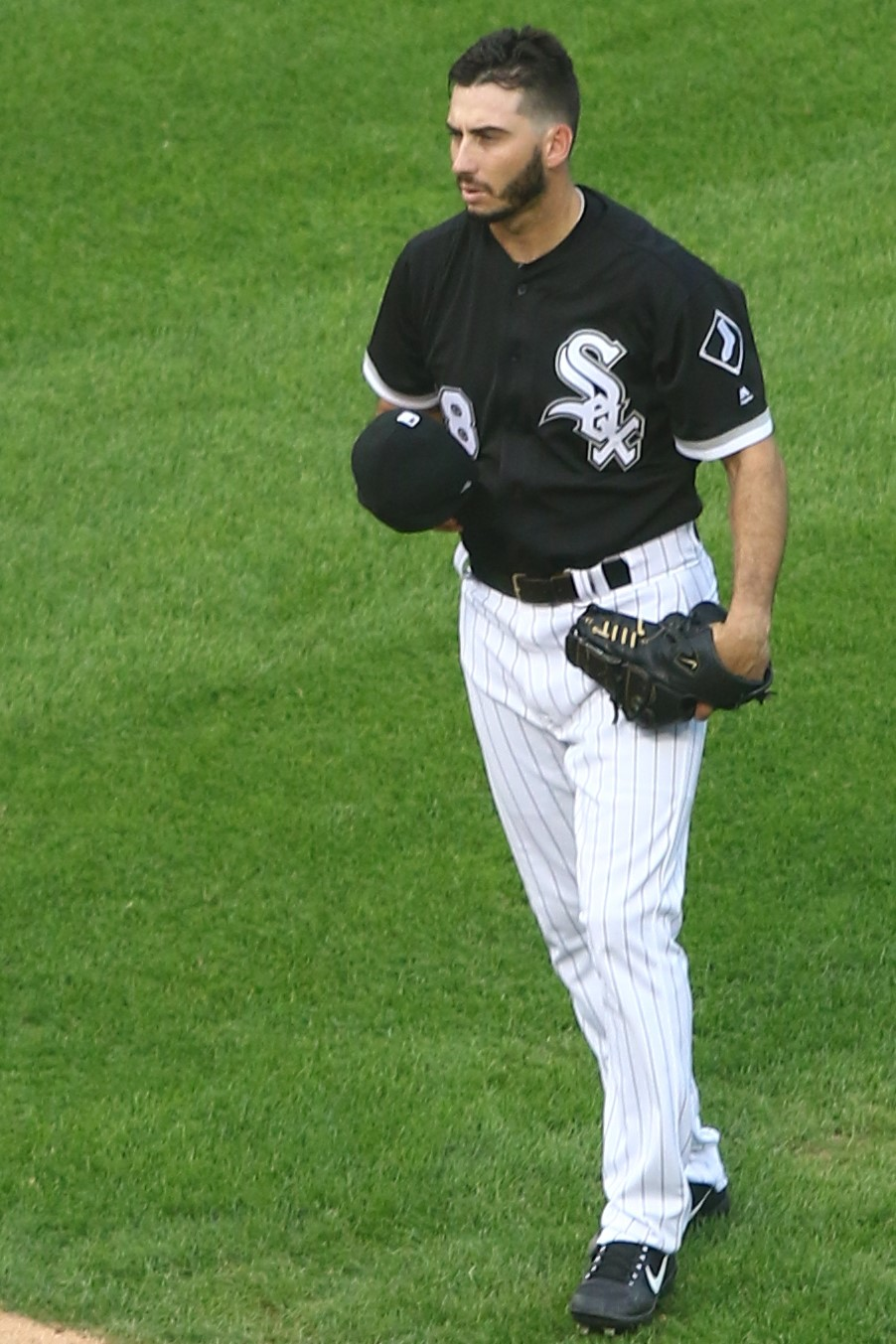
González for the 2017 Chicago White Sox

On March 30, 2016, González received his unconditional release by the Orioles, who opted to cut him rather than send him to the minor leagues at the beginning of the 2016 season.

On April 6, 2016, González signed a minor league deal with the Chicago White Sox. He had his contract selected to the major league roster on April 25. González appeared in 24 games, 23 starts for the White Sox posting an ERA of 3.73. He finished with a record of 5-8. González began the 2017 season in the White Sox starting rotation. He spent a few weeks on the disabled list, limiting him to just 22 starts.

=== Texas Rangers ===
On August 31, 2017, the White Sox traded González to the Texas Rangers in exchange for infielder Ti'Quan Forbes. In 5 starts for the Rangers, González was 1-3 with a 6.45 ERA and 5 strikeouts. He became a free agent following the season.

=== Chicago White Sox (second stint) ===
On January 11, 2018, González signed a one-year, $4.75 million contract with the White Sox. He appeared in 3 starts only before being lost for the season due to rotator cuff inflammation which required season-ending surgery. He elected free agency on October 29.

== Pitching style ==
González threw five pitches: a four seam fastball at 92-93 MPH, a sinker at 91 mph, a curveball at 77-80, a slider at 84-86 and a splitter at 82-85 for his out pitch.

== Personal life ==
González's wife, Lucía, gave birth to their first child, a daughter named Leah, in June 2013 in Southern California. Their second child, a son named Mateo, was born in August 2017.

== See also ==
- Rule 5 draft results
