= Blake Smith (baseball) =

American baseball player (born 1987)

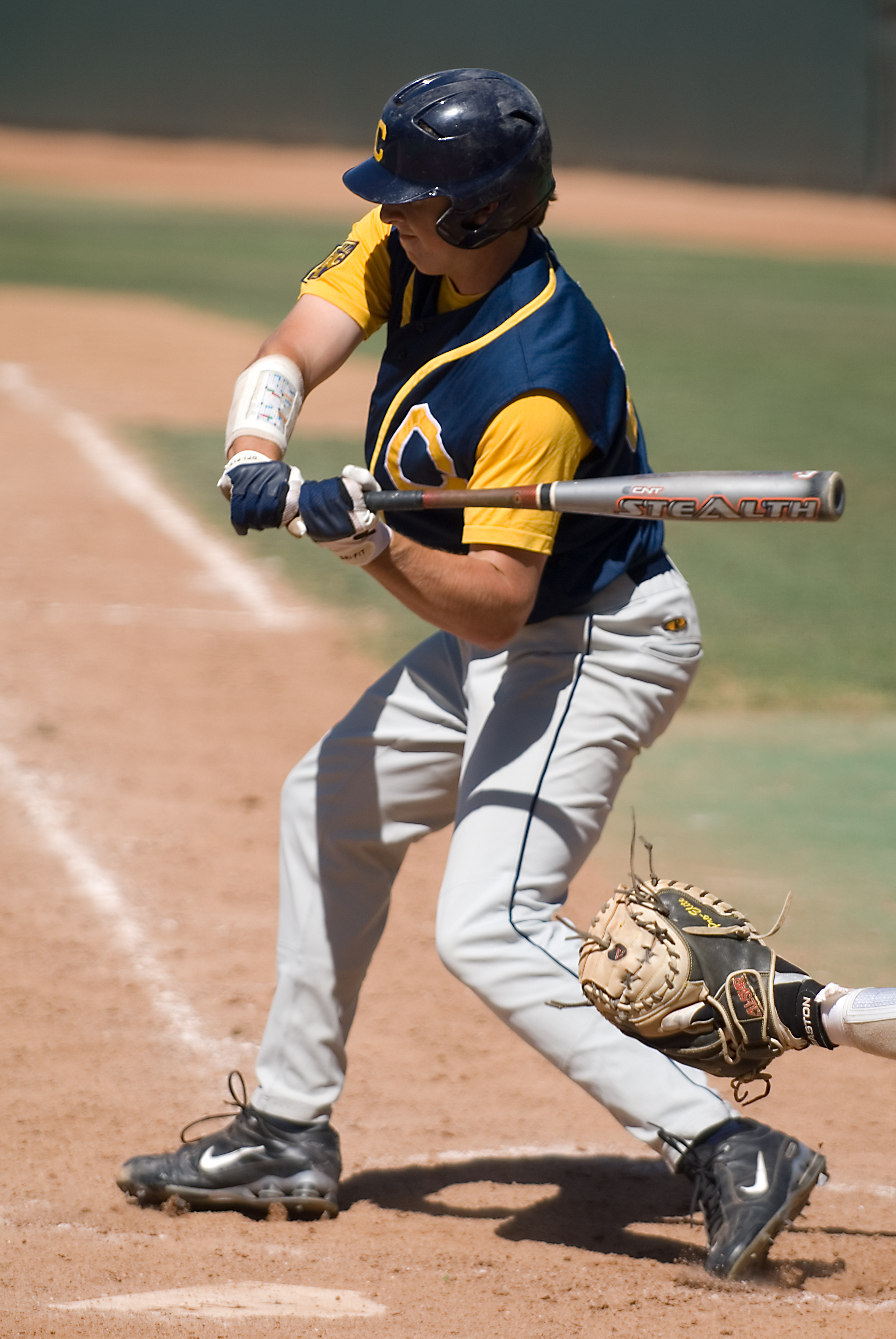
- Smith with Cal in 2007
- Pitcher
- Born: December 9, 1987 (age 37); Modesto, California, U.S.
- Batted: Left Threw: Right

MLB debut
- September 10, 2016, for the Chicago White Sox

Last MLB appearance
- September 21, 2016, for the Chicago White Sox

MLB statistics
- Win–loss record: 0–0
- Earned run average: 6.23
- Strikeouts: 1
- Stats at Baseball Reference

Teams
- Chicago White Sox (2016)

Blake Smith (born December 9, 1987) is an American former professional baseball pitcher. He played in Major League Baseball (MLB) for the Chicago White Sox in 2016.

== Career ==
Smith attended Thomas Downey High School in Modesto, California, and then the University of California, Berkeley, where he played college baseball for the California Golden Bears.

=== Los Angeles Dodgers ===
The Los Angeles Dodgers drafted Smith in the second round, with the 56th overall selection, of the 2009 Major League Baseball draft as an outfielder. He began his career with the rookie-level Ogden Dodgers of the Pioneer League in 2009 and was promoted to the Single-A Great Lakes Loons in 2010, where he hit .281 with 19 home runs and 76 RBI in 115 games. In 2011 with the High-A Rancho Cucamonga Quakes of the California League, Smith hit .294 with 16 home runs and 63 RBI in 74 games.

Smith was promoted to the Double-A Chattanooga Lookouts for 2012, hitting .267 with 13 home runs and 65 RBI. He began 2014 in Chattanooga also but struggled this season, hitting only .233 in 74 games with only 6 RBI. The Dodgers made the decision to convert Smith to pitcher, so he was demoted to Rancho Cucamonga where he appeared in 21 games with a 7.78 ERA. He posted better numbers in 2014, split between the Quakes and Lookouts, logging a 3.82 ERA with 61 strikeouts and 11 saves across 48 games. The Dodgers assigned Smith to the Glendale Desert Dogs in the Arizona Fall League after the season. He was assigned to the Double-A Tulsa Drillers of the Texas League to start the 2015 season. In 16 games for the Drillers, Smith had a 1.62 ERA with 16 strikeouts and three saves.

=== Chicago White Sox ===
Smith was traded to the Chicago White Sox on May 22, 2015, in exchange for Eric Surkamp. He split the year between the Double-A Birmingham Barons (4.26 ERA with 6 strikeouts in 4 games) and Triple-A Charlotte Knights (3.30 ERA with 42 strikeouts in 24 games). On December 10, Smith was selected by the San Diego Padres in the Rule 5 draft. On March 27, 2016, the Padres returned Smith to the White Sox before Opening Day.

Smith was promoted to the Major Leagues for the first time on September 6, 2016, and made his major league debut on September 10. In 5 games for the White Sox, he posted a 6.23 ERA with 1 strikeout across 4 1/3 innings pitched. On December 2, Chicago non-tendered Smith, making him a free agent.

On December 17, 2016, Smith re-signed with the White Sox on a minor league contract. He was released prior to the start of the season on March 27, 2017.

== See also ==
- Rule 5 draft results
