= 2023 Atlantic League season =

- League: Atlantic League
- Sport: Baseball
- Duration: April 28 – September 17 (Playoffs: September 19 – October 1)
- Number of games: approx. 126 (636 games in total)
- Number of teams: 10

Regular season
- Season MVP: Andretty Cordero (LAN)

Postseason
- North champions: Lancaster Barnstormers
- North runners-up: Long Island Ducks
- South champions: Gastonia Honey Hunters
- South runners-up: High Point Rockers

Championship Series
- Champions: Lancaster Barnstormers
- Finals MVP: Brent Teller (LAN)

ATTL seasons
- ← 2022 Atlantic League season 2024 Atlantic League season →

The 2023 Atlantic League season was the 26th season of the Atlantic League. There was a ten-team 126-game schedule. The Spire City Ghost Hounds were introduced to the league.

The Lancaster Barnstormers defeated the Gastonia Honey Hunters in the championship series, capturing their second consecutive championship and 4th in franchise history.

== Rules ==
In April 2023, it was announced that the Atlantic League would be testing three rules for the 2023 season:

- The "designated pinch-runner" rule will have clubs designate a pinch runner that is not in the starting line up. That player can be substituted into the game at any point as a baserunner, but unlike typical substitutions the player that is substituted for as well as the pinch-runner will be allowed to return to the game with no penalty.
- Pitchers will be allowed only one disengagement per at-bat. Any additional disengagements will be counted as a balk unless an out is recorded.
- The "double-hook" rule will continue being used in its 2022 form.

== Regular season standings ==
as of September 17, 2023

North Division Regular Season Standings
Pos	Team	G	W	L	Pct.	GB
1	e – York Revolution	125	71	54	.490	--
2	x – Long Island Ducks	124	66	58	.532	4.5
3	e – Southern Maryland Blue Crabs	126	64	62	.508	7.5
4	x – Lancaster Barnstormers	124	62	62	.544	8.5
5	e – Staten Island FerryHawks	124	49	75	.395	21.5

Long Island won first half. Lancaster won second half.

- y – Clinched division
- x – Clinched playoff spot
- e – Eliminated from playoff contention

South Division Regular Season Standings
Pos	Team	G	W	L	Pct.	GB
1	x – High Point Rockers	124	78	46	.629	--
2	x – Gastonia Honey Hunters	126	79	47	.627	--
3	e – Charleston Dirty Birds	126	56	70	.444	23
4	e – Spire City Ghost Hounds	123	49	74	.398	28.5
5	e – Lexington Counter Clocks	124	49	75	.395	29

High Point won first half. Gastonia, High Point named second half South Co-Champs.

- y – Clinched division
- x – Clinched playoff spot
- e – Eliminated from playoff contention

== Statistical leaders ==
=== Hitting ===
Stat	Player	Team	Total
HR	Thomas Dillard	Lexington Legends	39
AVG	Drew Mendoza	York Revolution	.346
RBIs	Andretty Cordero	Lancaster Barnstormers	116
SB	Trey Martin	York Revolution	46

Qualified leaders

=== Pitching ===
Stat	Player	Team	Total
W	Mickey Jannis	High Point Rockers	14
ERA	Danny Wirchansky	Charleston Dirty Birds	3.28
SO	Zach Mort	Gastonia Honey Hunters	147
SV	Kevin Quackenbush	Long Island Ducks	14

Qualified leaders

== Playoffs ==
=== Format ===
In 2023, the winners of each the first and second half of both the North and South division played a best of five divisional series from September 19-24. The winners played a best of five championship series from September 26 through October 1.

=== Playoff bracket ===
Division Series (best-of-five) 9/19-9/24
North Division
2	Lancaster Barnstormers	9	5	7	X	X
1	Long Island Ducks	5	1	2	X	X
South Division
2	Gastonia Honey Hunters	1	5	11	9	X
1	High Point Rockers	3	2	8	3	X

Championship Series (best-of-five) 9/26-10/1
N	Lancaster Barnstormers	3	3	3	9	7
S	Gastonia Honey Hunters	2	12	7	8	1

Pitcher Brent Teller of Lancaster was named Most Valuable Player of the championship series.

=== Individual Awards ===
Award	Player	Team
Manager of the Year	Mauro Gozzo	Gastonia Honey Hunters
Defensive Player of the Year	Melvin Mercedes	Lancaster Barnstormers
Player of the Year	Andretty Cordero	Lancaster Barnstormers
Pitcher of the Year	Zach Mort, Nick Raquet	Gastonia Honey Hunters, York Revolution

=== Team Awards ===
Award	Person	Team
Joe Klein Executive of the Year	Mike Reynolds	Lancaster Barnstormers
Ken Shepard Award for Promotional Excellence	Charleston Dirty Birds	
Promotion of the Year	Staten Island Ferry Hawks	
Mascot of the Year	QuackerJack, Long Island Ducks	
Ballpark of the Year	Clipper Magazine Stadium, Lancaster Barnstormers	
Ray Cipperly Groundskeeper of the Year	Mike Dunn	Spire City Ghost Hounds
Outstanding Community Service Award	York Revolution	

=== Red, White & Blue All-Defensive Team ===
Position	Player	Team
C	Beau Taylor	High Point Rockers
1B	Drew Mendoza	York Revolution
2B	Shed Long Jr., Melvin Mercedes	High Point Rockers, Lancaster Barnstormers
SS	Ruben Tejada	Long Island Ducks
3B	Trace Loehr	Lancaster Barnstormers
OF	D. J. Burt	High Point Rockers
OF	Braxton Lee	Southern Maryland Blue Crabs
OF	Tomo Otosaka	York Revolution
P	Mickey Jannis	High Point Rockers

=== Atlantic League Postseason All-Star Team ===
Position	Player	Team
C	Kole Cottam	Spire City Ghost Hounds
1B	Drew Mendoza, Thomas Dillard	York Revolution, Lexington Legends
2B	Shed Long Jr., Melvin Mercedes	High Point Rockers, Lancaster Barnstormers
SS	Angel Aguilar	Staten Island Ferry Hawks
3B	Andretty Cordero	Lancaster Barnstormers
OF	Leobaldo Cabrera	Spire City Ghost Hounds
OF	Dwight Smith Jr.	Charleston Dirty Birds
OF	Ben Aklinski	High Point Rockers
DH	Jose Marmolejos	Spire City Ghost Hounds
Starter	Zach Mort	Gastonia Honey Hunters
Reliever	Jameson McGrane	High Point Rockers
Closer	Ryan Dull	High Point Rockers
