= 2016 Major League Baseball draft =

Major League Baseball draft

General information
- Date: June 9–11, 2016
- Location: Secaucus, New Jersey
- Network: MLB Network

Overview
- 1,216 total selections
- First selection: Mickey Moniak; Philadelphia Phillies
- First round selections: 41

The 2016 Major League Baseball draft began on June 9, 2016, to assign amateur baseball players to MLB teams. The draft order is the reverse order of the 2015 MLB season standings. In addition, compensation picks were distributed for players who did not sign from the 2015 MLB draft. The Philadelphia Phillies received the first overall selection. The Los Angeles Dodgers received the 36th pick as compensation for failing to sign Kyle Funkhouser, the 35th overall selection of the 2015 MLB draft.

Teams from the smallest markets and revenue pools are eligible for competitive balance draft picks. The first six picks, Round A, were determined by lottery between the Arizona Diamondbacks, Colorado Rockies, Cincinnati Reds, Miami Marlins, San Diego Padres, Tampa Bay Rays, Milwaukee Brewers, Cleveland Indians, Oakland Athletics, Pittsburgh Pirates, Kansas City Royals, and St. Louis Cardinals. The six preceding teams that do not receive a pick in Round A were entered into a second lottery, with the Baltimore Orioles, Minnesota Twins, and Seattle Mariners, to receive the six picks in Round B. The twelve competitive balance draft picks are the only picks allowed to be traded. The Reds received the first pick in Round A, followed by the Athletics, Rockies, Diamondbacks, Marlins, and Pirates. The Padres received the first pick of Round B, followed by the Indians, Twins, Brewers, Orioles, and Rays.

== First round selections ==
Key
*	Player did not sign
*	All Star Selection

Pick	Player	Team	Position	School
1	Mickey Moniak	Philadelphia Phillies	Outfielder	La Costa Canyon High School (CA)
2	Nick Senzel	Cincinnati Reds	Third baseman	Tennessee
3	Ian Anderson	Atlanta Braves	Pitcher	Shenendehowa High School (NY)
4	Riley Pint	Colorado Rockies	Pitcher	St. Thomas Aquinas High School (KS)
5	Corey Ray	Milwaukee Brewers	Outfielder	Louisville
6	A. J. Puk	Oakland Athletics	Pitcher	Florida
7	Braxton Garrett	Miami Marlins	Pitcher	Florence High School (AL)
8	Cal Quantrill	San Diego Padres	Pitcher	Stanford
9	Matt Manning	Detroit Tigers	Pitcher	Sheldon High School (CA)
10	Zack Collins	Chicago White Sox	Catcher	Miami (FL)
11	Kyle Lewis	Seattle Mariners	Outfielder	Mercer
12	Jason Groome	Boston Red Sox	Pitcher	Barnegat High School (NJ)
13	Josh Lowe	Tampa Bay Rays	Third baseman	Pope High School (GA)
14	Will Benson	Cleveland Indians	Outfielder	The Westminster Schools (GA)
15	Alex Kirilloff	Minnesota Twins	Outfielder	Plum High School (PA)
16	Matt Thaiss	Los Angeles Angels	Catcher	Virginia
17	Forrest Whitley	Houston Astros	Pitcher	Alamo Heights High School (TX)
18	Blake Rutherford	New York Yankees	Outfielder	Chaminade College Prep (CA)
19	Justin Dunn	New York Mets	Pitcher	Boston College
20	Gavin Lux	Los Angeles Dodgers	Shortstop	Indian Trail Academy (WI)
21	T. J. Zeuch	Toronto Blue Jays	Pitcher	Pittsburgh
22	Will Craig	Pittsburgh Pirates	Third baseman	Wake Forest
23	Delvin Pérez	St. Louis Cardinals	Shortstop	International Baseball Academy (PR)

=== Compensatory round ===
Pick	Player	Team	Position	School
24	Hudson Sanchez	San Diego Padres (Note: Compensation pick for the Kansas City Royals signing Ian Kennedy)	Shortstop	Carroll Senior High School (TX)
25	Eric Lauer	San Diego Padres (Note: Compensation pick for the Detroit Tigers signing Justin Upton)	Pitcher	Kent State
26	Zack Burdi	Chicago White Sox (Note: Compensation pick for the San Francisco Giants signing Jeff Samardzija)	Pitcher	Louisville
27	Cody Sedlock	Baltimore Orioles (Note: Compensation pick for the Miami Marlins signing Wei-Yin Chen)	Pitcher	Illinois
28	Carter Kieboom	Washington Nationals (Note: Compensation pick for the Detroit Tigers signing Jordan Zimmermann)	Shortstop	Walton High School (GA)
29	Dane Dunning	Washington Nationals (Note: Compensation pick for the Texas Rangers signing Ian Desmond)	Pitcher	Florida
30	Cole Ragans	Texas Rangers (Note: Compensation pick for the Baltimore Orioles signing Yovani Gallardo)	Pitcher	North Florida Christian High School (FL)
31	Anthony Kay	New York Mets (Note: Compensation pick for the Washington Nationals signing Daniel Murphy)	Pitcher	Connecticut
32	Will Smith	Los Angeles Dodgers (Note: Compensation pick for the Arizona Diamondbacks signing Zack Greinke)	Catcher	Louisville
33	Dylan Carlson	St. Louis Cardinals (Note: Compensation pick for the Chicago Cubs signing John Lackey)	Outfielder	Elk Grove High School (CA)
34	Dakota Hudson	St. Louis Cardinals (Note: Compensation pick for the Chicago Cubs signing Jason Heyward)	Pitcher	Mississippi State

=== Competitive balance round A ===
Pick	Player	Team	Position	School
35	Taylor Trammell	Cincinnati Reds	Outfielder	Mount Paran Christian School (GA)
36	Jordan Sheffield	Los Angeles Dodgers (Note: Compensation pick for failing to sign Kyle Funkhouser in the 2015 draft)	Pitcher	Vanderbilt
37	Daulton Jefferies	Oakland Athletics	Pitcher	California
38	Robert Tyler	Colorado Rockies	Pitcher	Georgia
39	Anfernee Grier	Arizona Diamondbacks	Outfielder	Auburn
40	Joey Wentz	Atlanta Braves (Note: The Braves acquired the 40th pick from the Miami Marlins in a three-team trade. The Braves also traded Bronson Arroyo, Luis Avilán, Jim Johnson, José Peraza, and Alex Wood to the Los Angeles Dodgers for Héctor Olivera, Paco Rodriguez, and Zach Bird. The Marlins traded Mat Latos and Michael Morse to the Dodgers for Victor Araujo, Jeff Brigham, and Kevin Guzman.)	Pitcher	Shawnee Mission East High School (KS)
41	Nick Lodolo*	Pittsburgh Pirates	Pitcher	Damien High School (CA)

== Other notable selections ==
Round	Pick	Player	Team	Position	School
2	42	Kevin Gowdy	Philadelphia Phillies	Pitcher	Santa Barbara High School (CA)
2	43	Chris Okey	Cincinnati Reds	Catcher	Clemson
2	44	Kyle Muller	Atlanta Braves	Pitcher	Jesuit College Preparatory (TX)
2	45	Ben Bowden	Colorado Rockies	Pitcher	Vanderbilt
2	46	Lucas Erceg	Milwaukee Brewers	Third baseman	Menlo
2	47	Logan Shore	Oakland Athletics	Pitcher	Florida
2	48	Buddy Reed	San Diego Padres	Outfielder	Florida
2	49	Alec Hansen	Chicago White Sox	Pitcher	Oklahoma
2	50	Joe Rizzo	Seattle Mariners	Third baseman	Oakton High School (VA)
2	51	C. J. Chatham	Boston Red Sox	Shortstop	Florida Atlantic
2	52	Andy Yerzy	Arizona Diamondbacks	Catcher	York Mills Collegiate Institute (ON)
2	53	Ryan Boldt	Tampa Bay Rays	Outfielder	Nebraska
2	54	Keegan Akin	Baltimore Orioles	Pitcher	Western Michigan
2	55	Nolan Jones	Cleveland Indians	Third baseman	Holy Ghost Preparatory School (PA)
2	56	Ben Rortvedt	Minnesota Twins	Catcher	Verona Area High School (WI)
2	58	Sheldon Neuse	Washington Nationals	Third baseman	Oklahoma
2	59	Bryan Reynolds	San Francisco Giants	Outfielder	Vanderbilt
2	60	Brandon Marsh	Los Angeles Angels	Outfielder	Buford High School (GA)
2	61	Ronnie Dawson	Houston Astros	Outfielder	Ohio State
2	62	Nick Solak	New York Yankees	Second baseman	Louisville
2	63	Alex Speas	Texas Rangers	Pitcher	McEachern High School (GA)
2	64	Pete Alonso	New York Mets	First baseman	Florida
2	65	Mitch White	Los Angeles Dodgers	Pitcher	Santa Clara
2	66	Bo Bichette	Toronto Blue Jays	Shortstop	Lakewood High School (FL)
2	67	A.J. Puckett	Kansas City Royals	Pitcher	Pepperdine
2	68	Travis MacGregor	Pittsburgh Pirates	Pitcher	East Lake High School (FL)
2	70	Connor Jones	St. Louis Cardinals	Pitcher	Virginia
2	71	Reggie Lawson	San Diego Padres	Pitcher	Victor Valley High School (CA)
2	72	Logan Ice	Cleveland Indians	Catcher	Oregon State
2	73	José Miranda	Minnesota Twins	Second baseman	Leadership Christian Academy (PR)
2	74	Akil Baddoo	Minnesota Twins	Outfielder	Salem High School
2	75	Mario Feliciano	Milwaukee Brewers	Catcher	Carlos Beltran Academy (PR)
2	76	Brett Cumberland	Atlanta Braves	Catcher	California
2	77	Jake Fraley	Tampa Bay Rays	Outfielder	LSU
3	81	Garrett Hampson	Colorado Rockies	Infielder	Long Beach State
3	82	Braden Webb	Milwaukee Brewers	Pitcher	South Carolina
3	83	Sean Murphy	Oakland Athletics	Catcher	Wright State
3	85	Mason Thompson	San Diego Padres	Pitcher	Round Rock High School (TX)
3	86	Alex Call	Chicago White Sox	Outfielder	Ball State
3	87	Bryson Brigman	Seattle Mariners	Shortstop	San Diego
3	88	Shaun Anderson	Boston Red Sox	Pitcher	Florida
3	89	Jon Duplantier	Arizona Diamondbacks	Pitcher	Rice
3	91	Austin Hays	Baltimore Orioles	Outfielder	Jacksonville
3	92	Aaron Civale	Cleveland Indians	Pitcher	Northeastern
3	93	Griffin Jax	Minnesota Twins	Pitcher	Air Force
3	94	Jesús Luzardo	Washington Nationals	Pitcher	Marjory Stoneman Douglas High School (FL)
3	97	Jake Rogers	Houston Astros	Catcher	Tulane
3	101	Dustin May	Los Angeles Dodgers	Pitcher	Northwest High School (TX)
3	103	Khalil Lee	Kansas City Royals	Outfielder	Flint Hill School (VA)
3	104	Thomas Hatch	Chicago Cubs	Pitcher	Oklahoma State
3	105	Stephen Alemais	Pittsburgh Pirates	Shortstop	Tulane
3	106	Zac Gallen	St. Louis Cardinals	Pitcher	North Carolina
4	107	JoJo Romero	Philadelphia Phillies	Pitcher	Yavapai College
4	108	Scott Moss	Cincinnati Reds	Pitcher	Florida
4	109	Bryse Wilson	Atlanta Braves	Pitcher	Orange High School (NC)
4	110	Colton Welker	Colorado Rockies	Outfielder	Marjory Stoneman Douglas High School (FL)
4	111	Corbin Burnes	Milwaukee Brewers	Pitcher	Saint Mary's
4	113	Sean Reynolds	Miami Marlins	Right fielder	Redondo Union High School (CA)
4	114	Joey Lucchesi	San Diego Padres	Pitcher	Southeast Missouri State
4	115	Kyle Funkhouser	Detroit Tigers	Pitcher	Louisville
4	116	Jameson Fisher	Chicago White Sox	Outfielder	Southeastern Louisiana
4	117	Thomas Burrows	Seattle Mariners	Pitcher	Alabama
4	118	Bobby Dalbec	Boston Red Sox	Third baseman	Arizona
4	119	Curtis Taylor	Arizona Diamondbacks	Pitcher	UBC
4	120	Easton McGee	Tampa Bay Rays	Pitcher	Hopkinsville High School (KY)
4	121	Brenan Hanifee	Baltimore Orioles	Pitcher	Turner Ashby High School (VA)
4	122	Shane Bieber	Cleveland Indians	Pitcher	UC Santa Barbara
4	125	Matt Krook	San Francisco Giants	Pitcher	Oregon
4	126	Chris Rodriguez	Los Angeles Angels	Pitcher	Monsignor Edward Pace High School (FL)
4	128	Nick Nelson	New York Yankees	Pitcher	Gulf Coast State College
4	129	Charles Leblanc	Miami Marlins	Infielder	Pittsburgh
4	131	DJ Peters	Los Angeles Dodgers	Outfielder	Western Nevada
4	132	Josh Palacios	Toronto Blue Jays	Outfielder	Auburn
4	134	Tyson Miller	Chicago Cubs	Pitcher	California Baptist
4	135	Braeden Ogle	Pittsburgh Pirates	Pitcher	Jensen Beach High School (FL)
5	137	Cole Irvin	Philadelphia Phillies	Pitcher	Oregon
5	138	Ryan Hendrix	Cincinnati Reds	Pitcher	Texas A&M
5	144	Lake Bachar	San Diego Padres	Pitcher	Wisconsin–Whitewater
5	146	Jimmy Lambert	Chicago White Sox	Pitcher	Fresno State
5	147	Donovan Walton	Seattle Mariners	Second baseman	Oklahoma State
5	148	Mike Shawaryn	Boston Red Sox	Pitcher	Maryland
5	152	Conner Capel	Cleveland Indians	Outfielder	Seven Lakes High School (TX)
5	153	Jordan Balazovic	Minnesota Twins	Pitcher	St. Martin Secondary School (ON)
5	154	Daniel Johnson	Washington Nationals	Outfielder	New Mexico State
5	157	Abraham Toro	Houston Astros	Third baseman	Seminole State College
5	158	Dom Thompson-Williams	New York Yankees	Outfielder	South Carolina
5	161	Devin Smeltzer	Los Angeles Dodgers	Pitcher	San Jacinto
5	162	Cavan Biggio	Toronto Blue Jays	Second baseman	Notre Dame
5	163	Nicky Lopez	Kansas City Royals	Shortstop	Creighton
5	165	Blake Cederlind	Pittsburgh Pirates	Pitcher	Merced College
6	171	Payton Henry	Milwaukee Brewers	Catcher	Pleasant Grove High School (UT)
6	172	Brandon Bailey	Oakland Athletics	Pitcher	Gonzaga
6	175	Bryan Garcia	Detroit Tigers	Pitcher	Miami
6	178	Stephen Nogosek	Boston Red Sox	Pitcher	Oregon
6	181	Tobias Myers	Baltimore Orioles	Pitcher	Winter Haven High School (FL)
6	184	Tres Barrera	Washington Nationals	Catcher	Texas
6	188	Brooks Kriske	New York Yankees	Pitcher	USC
6	189	Kyle Cody	Texas Rangers	Pitcher	Kentucky
6	195	Cam Vieaux	Pittsburgh Pirates	Pitcher	Michigan State
6	196	Tommy Edman	St. Louis Cardinals	Third baseman	Stanford
7	206	Bernardo Flores	Chicago White Sox	Pitcher	USC
7	207	Matt Festa	Seattle Mariners	Pitcher	East Stroudsburg
7	219	Sam Huff	Texas Rangers	Catcher	Arcadia High School (AZ)
7	221	Luke Raley	Los Angeles Dodgers	Outfielder	Lake Erie
7	226	Andrew Knizner	St. Louis Cardinals	Catcher	NC State
8	235	Jacob Robson	Detroit Tigers	Outfielder	Mississippi State
8	245	Stephen Woods Jr.	San Francisco Giants	Pitcher	Albany
8	251	Andre Scrubb	Los Angeles Dodgers	Pitcher	High Point
9	269	Tommy Eveld	Arizona Diamondbacks	Pitcher	South Florida
9	275	Caleb Baragar	San Francisco Giants	Pitcher	Indiana
9	278	Tim Lynch	New York Yankees	First baseman	Southern Mississippi
9	280	Colin Holderman	New York Mets	Pitcher	Heartland Community College
9	281	Tony Gonsolin	Los Angeles Dodgers	Pitcher	Saint Mary's
10	287	Julian Garcia	Philadelphia Phillies	Pitcher	Metropolitan State
10	293	Dylan Lee	Miami Marlins	Pitcher	Fresno State
10	296	Zach Remillard	Chicago White Sox	Third baseman	Coastal Carolina
10	298	Santiago Espinal	Boston Red Sox	Third baseman	Miami Dade College
10	300	Spencer Jones	Tampa Bay Rays	Pitcher	Washington
10	302	Samad Taylor	Cleveland Indians	Second baseman	Corona High School (CA)
10	313	Richard Lovelady	Kansas City Royals	Pitcher	Kennesaw State
11	318	Joel Kuhnel	Cincinnati Reds	Pitcher	UT Arlington
11	323	Chad Smith	Miami Marlins	Pitcher	Ole Miss
11	325	Zac Houston	Detroit Tigers	Pitcher	Mississippi State
11	326	Ian Hamilton	Chicago White Sox	Pitcher	Washington State
11	328	Nick Quintana*	Boston Red Sox	Third baseman	Arbor View High School (NV)
11	330	Zack Thompson*	Tampa Bay Rays	Pitcher	Wapahani High School (IN)
11	339	Joe Barlow	Texas Rangers	Pitcher	Salt Lake Community College
11	341	AJ Alexy	Los Angeles Dodgers	Pitcher	Twin Valley High School (PA)
11	344	Michael Rucker	Chicago Cubs	Pitcher	BYU
11	345	Max Kranick	Pittsburgh Pirates	Pitcher	Valley View High School (PA)
12	362	Zach Plesac	Cleveland Indians	Pitcher	Ball State
12	368	Taylor Widener	New York Yankees	Pitcher	South Carolina
12	371	Graham Ashcraft*	Los Angeles Dodgers	Pitcher	Huntsville High School (AL)
13	390	Nate Lowe	Tampa Bay Rays	First baseman	Mississippi State
13	392	Gavin Collins	Cleveland Indians	Catcher	Mississippi State
14	412	Nolan Blackwood	Oakland Athletics	Pitcher	Memphis
14	414	Jared Poché*	San Diego Padres	Pitcher	LSU
14	419	Colin Poche	Arizona Diamondbacks	Pitcher	Dallas Baptist
14	425	Conner Menez	San Francisco Giants	Pitcher	The Master's College
14	431	Dean Kremer	Los Angeles Dodgers	Pitcher	UNLV
14	434	Parker Dunshee*	Chicago Cubs	Pitcher	Wake Forest
15	444	Jack Suwinski	San Diego Padres	Outfielder	Taft High School (IL)
15	445	John Schreiber	Detroit Tigers	Pitcher	Northwestern Ohio
15	453	Tyler Wells	Minnesota Twins	Pitcher	Cal State San Bernardino
15	457	Alex De Goti	Houston Astros	Shortstop	Barry
15	462	Josh Winckowski	Toronto Blue Jays	Pitcher	Estero High School (FL)
16	477	Lyle Lin*	Seattle Mariners	Catcher	JSerra Catholic High School (CA)
16	493	Nick Heath	Kansas City Royals	Outfielder	Northwestern State
17	501	Weston Wilson	Milwaukee Brewers	Infielder	Clemson
17	510	Wyatt Mills*	Tampa Bay Rays	Pitcher	Gonzaga
17	512	Trenton Brooks	Cleveland Indians	Outfielder	Nevada
17	518	Armando Alvarez	New York Yankees	Infielder	Eastern Kentucky
17	524	Zack Short	Chicago Cubs	Shortstop	Sacred Heart
18	531	Cooper Hummel	Milwaukee Brewers	Outfielder	Portland
18	537	Robert Dugger	Seattle Mariners	Pitcher	Texas Tech
18	538	Trevor Stephan*	Boston Red Sox	Pitcher	Hill College
18	539	Bowden Francis*	Arizona Diamondbacks	Pitcher	Chipola College
18	545	Jacob Heyward	San Francisco Giants	Outfielder	Miami
18	548	Greg Weissert	New York Yankees	Pitcher	Fordham
19	559	Tucker Davidson	Atlanta Braves	Pitcher	Midland College
19	560	Jacob Bosiokovic	Colorado Rockies	First baseman	Ohio State
19	564	A. J. Brown	San Diego Padres	Outfielder	Starkville High School (MS)
19	568	Kyle Hart	Boston Red Sox	Pitcher	Indiana
19	573	Sean Poppen	Minnesota Twins	Pitcher	Harvard
19	584	Matt Swarmer	Chicago Cubs	Pitcher	Kutztown
19	586	Daniel Castano	St. Louis Cardinals	Pitcher	Baylor
20	593	Eric Gutierrez	Miami Marlins	First baseman	Texas Tech
20	596	Matt Foster	Chicago White Sox	Pitcher	Alabama
20	597	Eric Filia	Seattle Mariners	Outfielder	UCLA
20	606	Jack Kruger	Los Angeles Angels	Catcher	Mississippi State
20	610	Carlos Cortes*	New York Mets	Second baseman	Lake Howell High School (FL)
20	613	Anthony Bender	Kansas City Royals	Pitcher	Santa Rosa Junior College
20	615	Adam Oller	Pittsburgh Pirates	Pitcher	Northwestern State
21	624	Taylor Kohlwey	San Diego Padres	Outfielder	University of Wisconsin–La Crosse
21	630	John McMillon*	Tampa Bay Rays	Third baseman	Jasper High School (TX)
21	632	Wil Crowe*	Cleveland Indians	Pitcher	South Carolina
22	659	Kevin Ginkel	Arizona Diamondbacks	Pitcher	Arizona
22	664	Sterling Sharp	Washington Nationals	Pitcher	Drury
23	687	Jack Anderson*	Seattle Mariners	Pitcher	Penn State
23	693	Caleb Hamilton	Minnesota Twins	Catcher	Oregon State
24	710	J. D. Hammer	Colorado Rockies	Pitcher	Marshall
24	714	Hunter Bishop*	San Diego Padres	Outfielder	Junípero Serra High School (CA)
24	717	Trey Griffey*	Seattle Mariners	N/A	Arizona
24	719	Riley Smith	Arizona Diamondbacks	Pitcher	LSU
25	751	Will Toffey*	Baltimore Orioles	Third baseman	Vanderbilt
25	762	Casey Legumina*	Toronto Blue Jays	Pitcher	Basha High School (AZ)
25	764	Trent Giambrone	Chicago Cubs	Second baseman	Delta State
25	765	Hunter Owen	Pittsburgh Pirates	Third baseman	Indiana State
26	774	Grae Kessinger*	San Diego Padres	Shortstop	Oxford High School (MS)
26	783	Greg Deichmann*	Minnesota Twins	Third baseman	LSU
27	799	Corbin Clouse	Atlanta Braves	Pitcher	Davenport
27	818	Phil Diehl	New York Yankees	Pitcher	Louisiana Tech
28	846	David Hamilton*	Los Angeles Angels	Shortstop	San Marcos High School (TX)
29	872	Spencer Steer*	Cleveland Indians	Second baseman	Millikan High School (CA)
29	885	Geoff Hartlieb	Pittsburgh Pirates	Pitcher	Lindenwood
30	898	Tyler Fitzgerald*	Boston Red Sox	Shortstop	Rochester High School (IL)
31	921	Ryan Aguilar	Milwaukee Brewers	First baseman	Arizona
31	927	Lincoln Henzman*	Seattle Mariners	Pitcher	Louisville
31	931	Spencer Jones	Houston Astros	First baseman	Gonzaga
31	939	Blair Calvo*	Texas Rangers	Pitcher	Eastern Florida State College
32	962	Kramer Robertson*	Cleveland Indians	Second baseman	LSU
32	963	Matt Wallner*	Minnesota Twins	Outfielder	Forest Lake Area High School (MN)
32	967	Darius Vines*	Houston Astros	Pitcher	St. Bonaventure High School (CA)
32	970	George Kirby*	New York Mets	Pitcher	Rye High School (NY)
33	985	Keegan Thompson*	Detroit Tigers	Pitcher	Auburn
33	990	Hayden Wesneski*	Tampa Bay Rays	Pitcher	Cy-Fair High School (TX)
33	1001	Zach McKinstry	Los Angeles Dodgers	Outfielder	Central Michigan
33	1003	Kameron Misner*	Kansas City Royals	Outfielder	Poplar Bluff High School (MO)
34	1022	Austin Shenton*	Cleveland Indians	Third baseman	Bellingham High School (WA)
34	1027	Stijn van der Meer	Houston Astros	Shortstop	Lamar
34	1032	Shea Langeliers*	Toronto Blue Jays	Catcher	Keller High School (TX)
34	1033	Nathan Webb	Kansas City Royals	Pitcher	Lee's Summit North High School (MO)
34	1034	Davis Daniel*	Chicago Cubs	Pitcher	Saint James School (AL)
35	1040	Michael Toglia*	Colorado Rockies	First baseman	Gig Harbor High School (WA)
35	1044	David Bednar	San Diego Padres	Pitcher	Lafayette
35	1064	Ryan Kreidler*	Chicago Cubs	Third baseman	Davis High School (CA)
36	1067	Mac Sceroler*	Philadelphia Phillies	Pitcher	Southeastern Louisiana
36	1075	Drew Mendoza*	Detroit Tigers	Third baseman	Lake Minneola High School (FL)
36	1086	José Rojas	Los Angeles Angels	Shortstop	Vanguard
37	1104	Ryan Rolison*	San Diego Padres	Pitcher	University School of Jackson (TN)
37	1110	Ryan Zeferjahn*	Tampa Bay Rays	Pitcher	Seaman High School (KS)
37	1126	Andy Young	St. Louis Cardinals	Third baseman	Indiana State
38	1132	Matt Fraizer*	Oakland Athletics	Outfielder	Clovis North High School (CA)
38	1135	Josh Smith*	Detroit Tigers	Second baseman	Catholic High School (LA)
38	1138	Austin Bergner*	Boston Red Sox	Pitcher	Windermere Preparatory School (FL)
38	1143	Brent Rooker*	Minnesota Twins	Outfielder	Mississippi State
39	1165	J.J. Bleday*	San Diego Padres	Outfielder	A. Crawford Mosley High School (FL)
39	1178	Brian Keller	New York Yankees	Pitcher	Wisconsin-Milwaukee
39	1181	Ryan Watson*	Los Angeles Dodgers	Pitcher	Auburn High School (AL)
40	1197	Adley Rutschman*	Seattle Mariners	Catcher	Sherwood High School (OR)
40	1215	Bret Boswell*	Pittsburgh Pirates	Outfielder	Texas

== Notes ==
Compensation picks

Trades
