= Mitch Moreland =

American baseball player (born 1985)

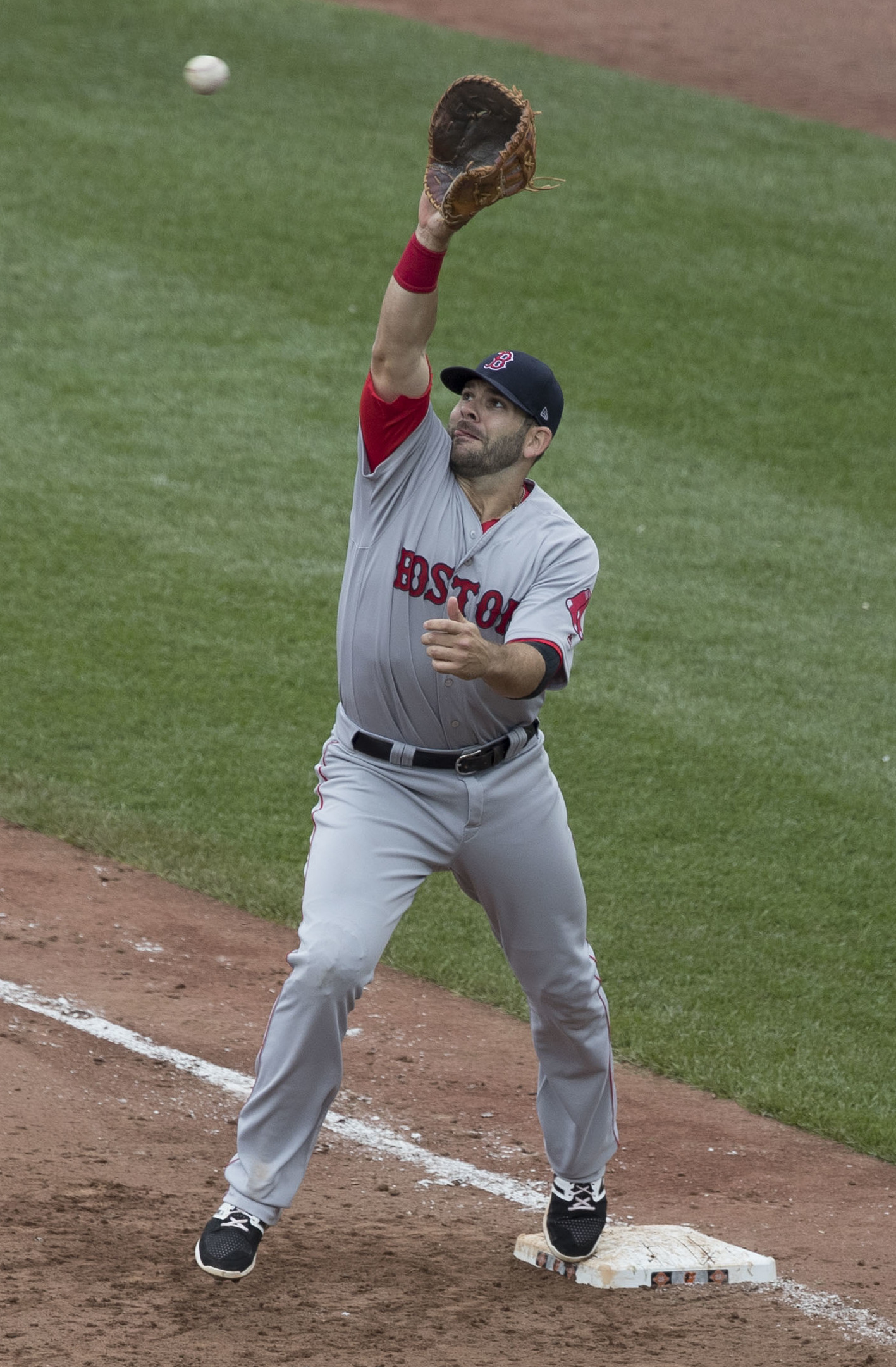
- Moreland with the Boston Red Sox in 2017
- First baseman
- Born: September 6, 1985 (age 40); Amory, Mississippi, U.S.
- Batted: Left Threw: Left

MLB debut
- July 29, 2010, for the Texas Rangers

Last MLB appearance
- August 26, 2021, for the Oakland Athletics

MLB statistics
- Batting average: .251
- Home runs: 186
- Runs batted in: 618
- Stats at Baseball Reference

Teams
- Texas Rangers (2010–2016); Boston Red Sox (2017–2020); San Diego Padres (2020); Oakland Athletics (2021)

Career highlights and awards
- All-Star (2018); World Series champion (2018); Gold Glove Award (2016)

Mitchell Austin Moreland (born September 6, 1985), nicknamed "2-Bags", is an American former professional baseball first baseman. He played in Major League Baseball (MLB) for the Texas Rangers, Boston Red Sox, San Diego Padres, and Oakland Athletics. Moreland attended Mississippi State University and was drafted by the Rangers as a first baseman and outfielder in the 17th round of the 2007 MLB draft. Listed at 6 feet 2 inches (1.88 m) and 230 pounds (100 kg), Moreland both batted and threw left-handed.

== Amateur career ==
Born and raised in Amory, Mississippi, Moreland attended Amory High School, where he competed in baseball and soccer. At Amory, he was a 2004 Louisville Slugger All-American after posting a 7–1 win–loss record with a 0.53 earned run average (ERA) as a senior, while also batting .456 and striking out just three times during the season. While in high school, he played on the same team as Derek Norris. After high school, Moreland attended Mississippi State University to play college baseball for the Mississippi State Bulldogs. There, he hit .343 with ten home runs his junior season and went 2–0 on the mound with a 3.46 ERA. He also earned a degree in general business administration. In 2006 and 2007, he played collegiate summer baseball with the Bourne Braves of the Cape Cod Baseball League.

== Professional career ==
=== Minor leagues ===
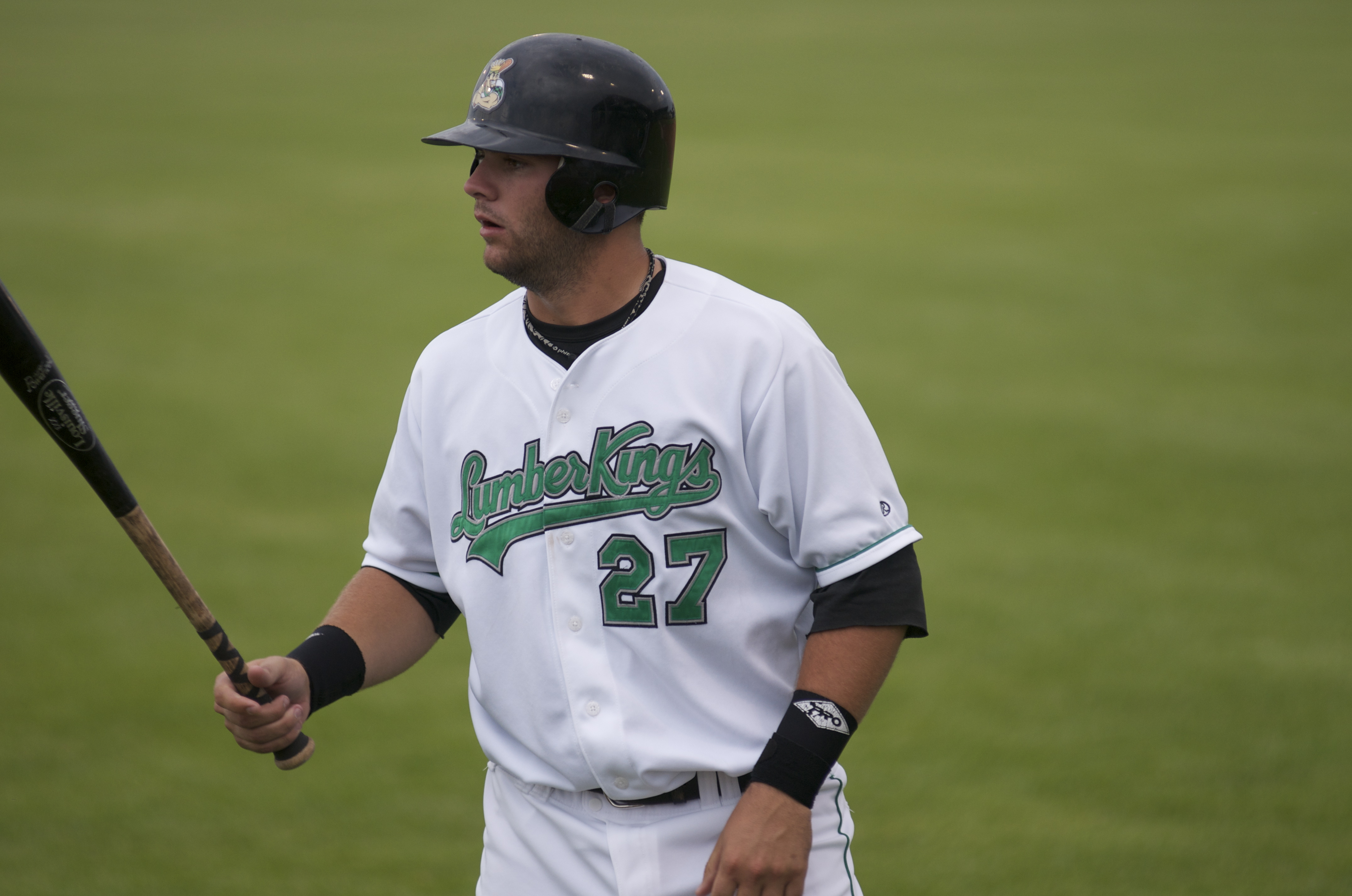
Moreland with the Clinton LumberKings in 2008

The Texas Rangers selected Moreland in the 17th round of the 2007 Major League Baseball draft. After he signed, Moreland began his professional career with the short-season Spokane Indians of the Northwest League. He batted .259 with 28 hits, seven doubles, one triple, two home runs and 15 runs batted in (RBIs).

The following season, Moreland joined the Class-A Clinton LumberKings of the Midwest League and hit .324 with 37 doubles, four triples, 18 home runs, 99 RBIs and two stolen bases. He was named to the Mid-Season Midwest League All-Star Team on June 17 and the Post-Season Midwest League All-Star Team on August 26.

Moreland played in two different levels of the Rangers' organization in 2009. He started the season with the Class-A Advanced Bakersfield Blaze and hit .341 with 19 doubles, eight home runs and 26 RBIs. He was promoted to the Double-A Frisco RoughRiders where he batted .326 with 19 doubles, three triples, eight home runs and 59 RBIs. Moreland was assigned to the Arizona Fall League at the end of the season and played for the Surprise Rafters. He was named the "Tom Grieve Minor League Player of the Year" by the Texas Rangers after the season.

The Rangers invited Moreland to spring training in 2010. Moreland played with the Oklahoma City RedHawks (AAA) in the 2010 season until July 29. As of July 29, he had a season batting average of .289 with the RedHawks.

=== Texas Rangers ===
==== 2010 ====
On July 29, 2010, Moreland was called up by the Rangers to take the roster spot of Ian Kinsler, who was put on the disabled list. Moreland had his first major league hit in his first at-bat, a single against Oakland Athletics pitcher Vin Mazzaro. Moreland finished the game 2-for-4, with two singles, as the Rangers won 7–4. On August 13, Moreland had the first home run of his major league career, off of Josh Beckett the Red Sox. On September 26, Moreland had his first multi-home run game of his major league career, hitting his sixth and seventh home runs of the year, in a 16–9 win over the Oakland Athletics. During the regular season, Moreland played in 47 games, batting .255 with nine home runs and 25 RBIs.

On October 30, Moreland hit a second inning, three-run home run off of Jonathan Sánchez to put the Rangers ahead 3–0 in Game 3 of the World Series. He was the first Rangers player in the Series to hit a home run. The Rangers eventually lost to the San Francisco Giants in five games.

==== 2011 ====
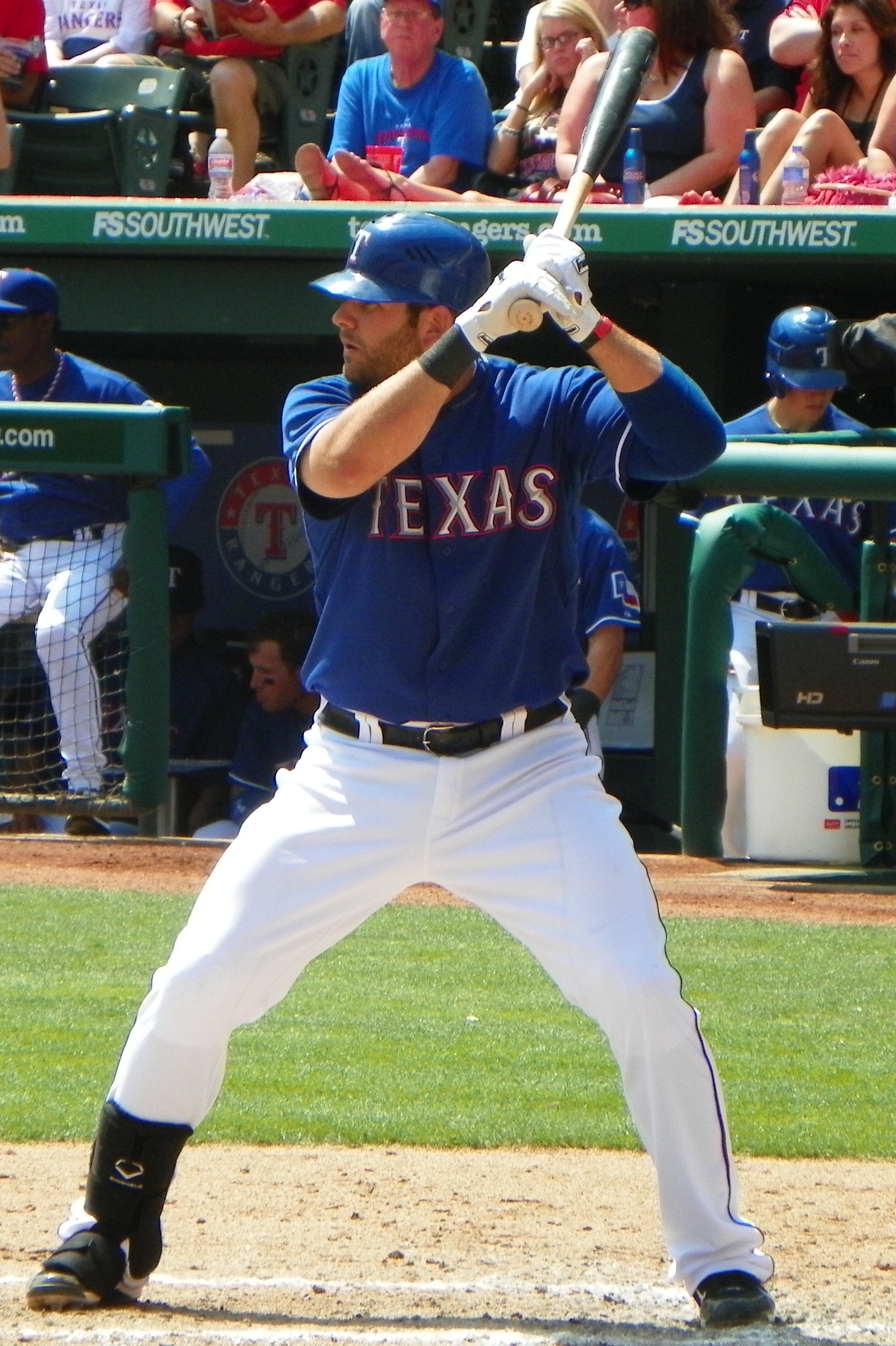
Moreland with the Rangers in 2011

On June 21, 2011, Moreland hit his first career walk-off home run off of Enerio del Rosario of the Houston Astros. For the 2011 season, Moreland batted .259 with 16 home runs and 51 RBIs in 134 games played. The Rangers were in the World Series for the second season in a row; Moreland had one home run during the Series against the St. Louis Cardinals, which the Rangers lost in seven games.

==== 2012 ====
On June 9, 2012, Moreland became only the second American League batter—David Ortiz being the first—to hit a home run ball into AT&T Park's McCovey Cove. Moreland's 428-foot, 8th-inning blast off Giants pitcher Ryan Vogelsong was also the first pinch hit home run hit into the Cove by any non-Giants player. During the 2012 season, Moreland batted .275 with 15 home runs and 50 RBIs in 114 games played.

==== 2013 ====
Moreland batted a career-low .232 during the 2013 season, with 23 home runs and 60 RBIs in 147 games played.

==== 2014 ====
On May 6, 2014, Moreland pitched an inning against the Colorado Rockies in a 12–1 Rangers loss; he retired the side in order. Moreland did not play after June 7, due to an ankle injury that required surgery. In 52 games played, he had two home runs, 23 RBIs, and a .246 average.

==== 2015 ====
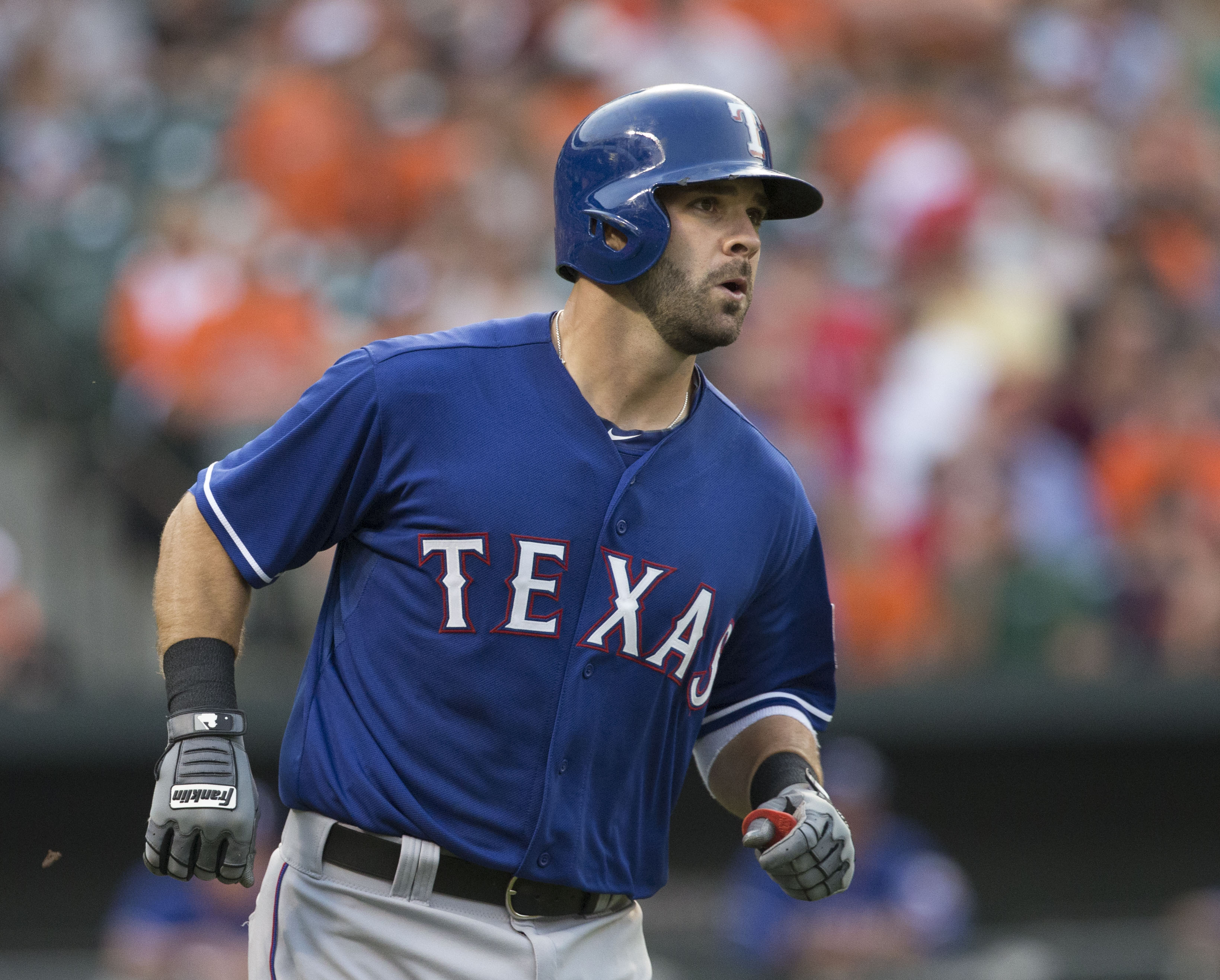
Moreland with the Rangers in 2015

The 2015 season was a career year for Moreland. In 132 games played, he was second on the Rangers behind Prince Fielder with a .278 batting average and 85 RBIs; he was tied with Fielder for the team lead with 23 home runs.

==== 2016 ====
In 2016, Moreland batted .233, had 22 home runs and 60 RBIs in 147 games played. He also won his first Gold Glove Award.

Overall, in seven seasons with the Rangers, Moreland batted .254 with 110 home runs and 354 RBIs in 773 games played.

=== Boston Red Sox ===
On December 8, 2016, Moreland signed a one-year contract with the Boston Red Sox.

==== 2017 ====
On August 25, 2017, Moreland made the second pitching appearance of his career, tossing an inning against the Baltimore Orioles in a 16–3 Red Sox loss; he allowed two hits but no runs, striking out one batter, catcher Caleb Joseph. During the regular season, Moreland played in 149 games, primarily as Boston's first baseman, batting .246 with 22 home runs and 79 RBIs.

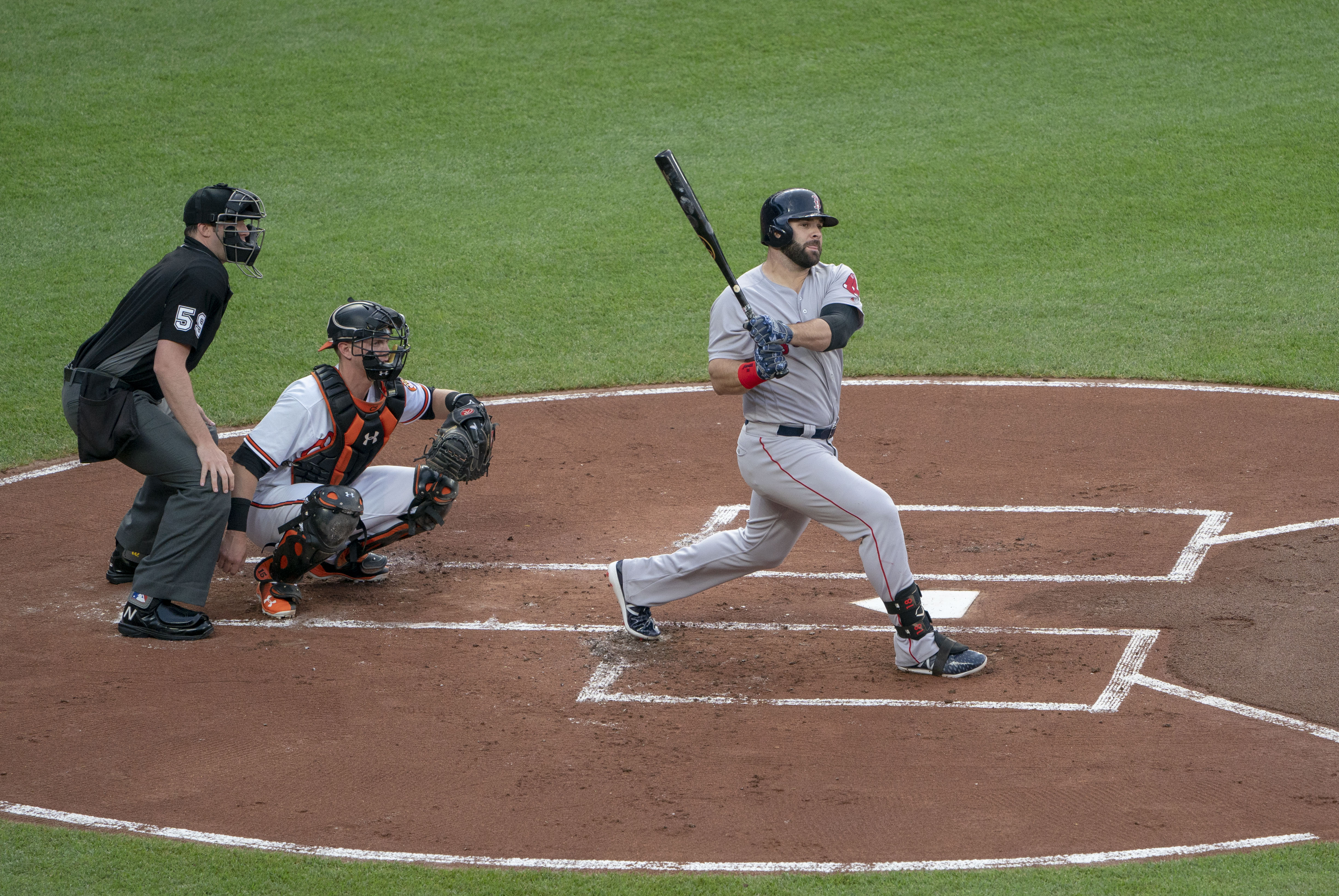
Moreland with the Red Sox in June 2018

In the postseason, Moreland played in all four games of the ALDS, batting 5-for-13 (.385) as the Red Sox lost to the eventual 2017 World Series champions, the Houston Astros. On December 18, 2017, Moreland signed a two-year contract with the Red Sox.

==== 2018 ====
Early in the 2018 season, Moreland split time with Hanley Ramírez as Boston's first baseman, until Ramírez was designated for assignment on May 25. On July 8, Moreland was named to the 2018 MLB All-Star Game as an American League reserve first baseman. At that point in the season, Moreland had a slash line of .288/.358/.525 with 11 home runs and 43 RBIs in 71 games played. After the All Star break, Moreland struggled offensively, hitting .191 with 4 home runs in 47 games. Overall, Moreland finished hitting .245 with 15 home runs and 68 RBIs.

In the postseason, Moreland appeared in 11 games, batting 5-for-17 (.294) In Game Four of the World Series, on October 27, 2018, Moreland hit a three-run home run off of the Los Angeles Dodgers' Ryan Madson, which was viewed as a turning point in the series as it put the Red Sox within one run after trailing 0-4, sparking a rally where they eventually won 9–6. The Red Sox went on to win Game Five 5–1 to capture their 9th championship in franchise history, giving Moreland his first World Series ring.

==== 2019 ====
Moreland began the 2019 season as Boston's primary first baseman. On March 29, he hit a three-run home run in the top of the ninth inning off of Hunter Strickland of the Seattle Mariners, giving the Red Sox the winning runs in a 7–6 victory. Moreland was placed on the 10-day injured list with a low back strain on May 29, activated on June 7, and returned to the injured list on June 8 with a right quad strain. He started rehabilitation assignments with the Triple-A Pawtucket Red Sox on July 11 and July 19, and was activated on July 23. For the season, Moreland appeared in 91 games with Boston, batting .252 with 19 home runs and 58 RBIs. He became a free agent on October 31.

==== 2020 ====
Moreland and the Red Sox reached agreement on a one-year contract announced on January 28, 2020. With the 2020 Red Sox from the delayed start of the season through late August, he appeared in 22 games, batting .328 with eight home runs and 21 RBIs.

=== San Diego Padres ===
He was traded to the San Diego Padres on August 30, 2020, in exchange for minor leaguers Jeisson Rosario and Hudson Potts. With the Padres in 2020, Moreland played in 20 games and hit .203 with 2 home runs and 8 RBIs.

=== Oakland Athletics ===
On February 23, 2021, Moreland signed a one-year, $2.25 million contract with the Oakland Athletics. He appeared in 81 games, primarily at designated hitter. He hit 10 home runs with a .229 batting average and a .701 OPS.

Moreland did not play during the 2022 season. On March 7, 2023, Moreland announced his retirement.

== Post-playing career ==
On June 8, 2024, Moreland returned to Fenway Park as one of four former Red Sox to play an exhibition game for the Savannah Bananas barnstorming team.

Moreland served as the first base coach for the American League team in the 2024 All-Star Futures Game.

On July 11, 2025, Moreland was hired to serve as the head varsity baseball coach at Helena High School.

== Personal life ==
Moreland married Susannah Higgins on November 13, 2011. As of March 2019, the couple have three children: two sons and a daughter. They reside in Helena, Alabama, and also own a farm in Mississippi.
