= Corbin Clouse =

American baseball player (born 1995)

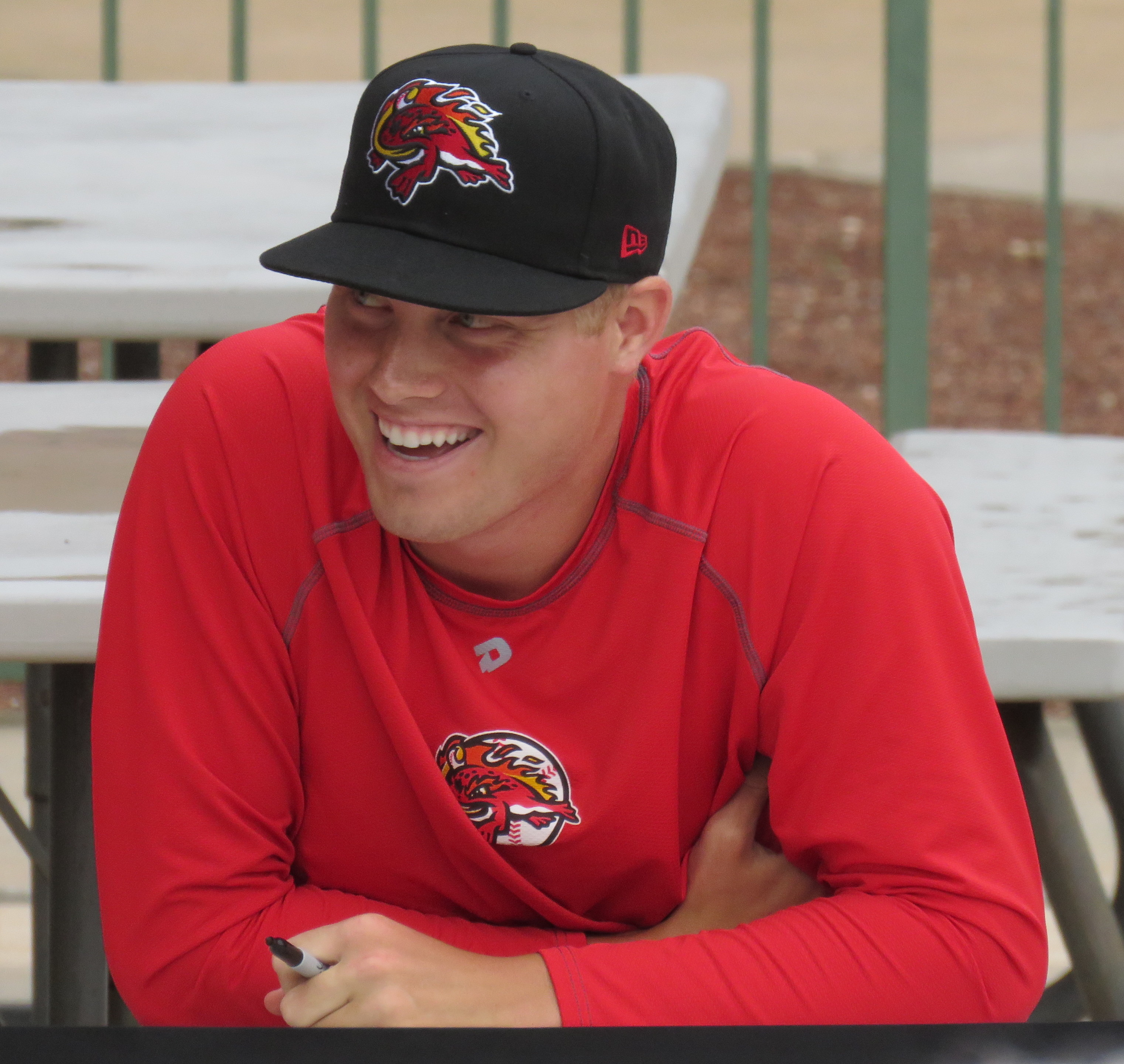
- Clouse in 2017 with the Florida Fire Frogs
- Pitcher
- Born: June 26, 1995 (age 30); Lansing, Michigan, U.S.
- Bats: Switch Throws: Left

Corbin James Clouse (born June 26, 1995) is an American former professional baseball pitcher.

== Career ==
Clouse attended Grand Ledge High School in Grand Ledge, Michigan, and played college baseball at Davenport University in Grand Rapids, Michigan. In 2016, as a redshirt sophomore, he went 5–0 with a 1.62 ERA. After the season, he was drafted by the Atlanta Braves in the 27th round of the 2016 Major League Baseball draft.

Clouse made his professional debut that year with the Danville Braves, and after pitching 6 2/3 scoreless innings, was promoted to the Rome Braves where he finished the season, posting a 1.52 ERA over 15 relief appearances. He began 2017 with the Florida Fire Frogs and was promoted to the Mississippi Braves during the season. Over 41 relief appearances between both teams, he was 5–4 with a 2.53 ERA and a 1.55 WHIP. After the season, he played in the Arizona Fall League. He began 2018 with Mississippi and was promoted to the Gwinnett Stripers in August. Over 45 appearances (three starts) between the two clubs, he went 6–2 with a 1.94 ERA, striking out 83 batters in 65 innings. He returned to Gwinnett for the 2019 season, going 0–3 with a 5.65 ERA over 28 2/3 relief innings, striking out 37. Following the season's end, he underwent shoulder surgery.

Clouse did not play a minor league game in 2020 due to the cancellation of the minor league season caused by the COVID-19 pandemic. Due to undisclosed reasons, Clouse did not make his 2021 debut until mid-August, with Mississippi. Over 13 games (three starts), he went 1–0 with a 1.48 ERA and 33 strikeouts over 24 1/3 innings. Clouse underwent Tommy John surgery prior to the 2022 season and missed the entire year as a result. He elected free agency following the season on November 10, 2022.

On February 25, 2023, Clouse announced his retirement from professional baseball via Instagram.
