= Gavin Collins (baseball) =

American baseball player (born 1995)

Long Island Ducks – No. 17
- Third baseman / Catcher
- Born: July 17, 1995 (age 30); Newport Beach, California, U.S.
- Bats: Right Throws: Right

Gavin Patrik Collins (born July 17, 1995) is an American professional baseball third baseman and catcher for the Long Island Ducks of the Atlantic League of Professional Baseball. He was drafted by the Cleveland Indians in the 13th round of the 2016 MLB draft.

== Amateur career ==
Collins attended El Toro High School in Lake Forest, California, and played college baseball at Mississippi State University. In 2014, he played collegiate summer baseball with the Bourne Braves of the Cape Cod Baseball League. As a junior at Mississippi State in 2016, he hit .302 with ten home runs and 39 runs batted in (RBI) over sixty games, splitting time in the field between catcher and third base. After the season, he was selected by the Cleveland Indians in the 13th round of the 2016 Major League Baseball draft.

== Professional career ==
=== Cleveland Indians/Guardians ===
Collins signed with the Indians and made his professional debut with the Mahoning Valley Scrappers with whom he hit .260 over 48 games. In 2017, he split his time between the Lake County Captains and Lynchburg Hillcats, slashing a combined .272/.340/.481 with 12 home runs and 54 RBI over 80 games. In 2018, he returned to Lynchburg and hit .232 over 62 games. For the third straight year, in 2019, he spent the season with Lynchburg, batting .262 with seven home runs and 61 RBI over 100 games. He did not play in a game in 2020 due to the cancellation of the season because of the COVID-19 pandemic.

Collins spent the 2021 season with the Columbus Clippers, batting .182 with five home runs and 22 RBI over 50 games. He returned to Columbus to begin the 2022 season. In 41 games for the Clippers, Collins slashed .235/.326/.370 with four home runs and 16 RBI. He elected free agency following the season on November 10, 2022.

=== Kansas City Monarchs ===
On January 25, 2023, Collins signed a minor league contract with the Tampa Bay Rays organization. Collins was released by the Rays on March 29.

On April 5, 2023, Collins signed with the Kansas City Monarchs of the American Association of Professional Baseball. In 62 games for Kansas City, he batted .314/.382/.515 with 10 home runs and 41 RBI. In addition, Collins was named an All–Star for the Monarchs during the season.

=== St. Louis Cardinals ===
On December 21, 2023, Collins signed a minor league contract with the St. Louis Cardinals. He made 62 appearances for the Triple-A Memphis Redbirds in 2024, slashing .264/.335/.461 with nine home runs and 35 RBI.

Collins returned to Memphis in 2025, playing in 76 games and batting .221/.299/.297 with two home runs, 39 RBI, and four stolen bases. He elected free agency following the season on November 6, 2025.

=== Long Island Ducks ===
On March 31, 2026, Collins signed with the Long Island Ducks of the Atlantic League of Professional Baseball.
