= Hudson Potts =

American baseball player (born 1998)

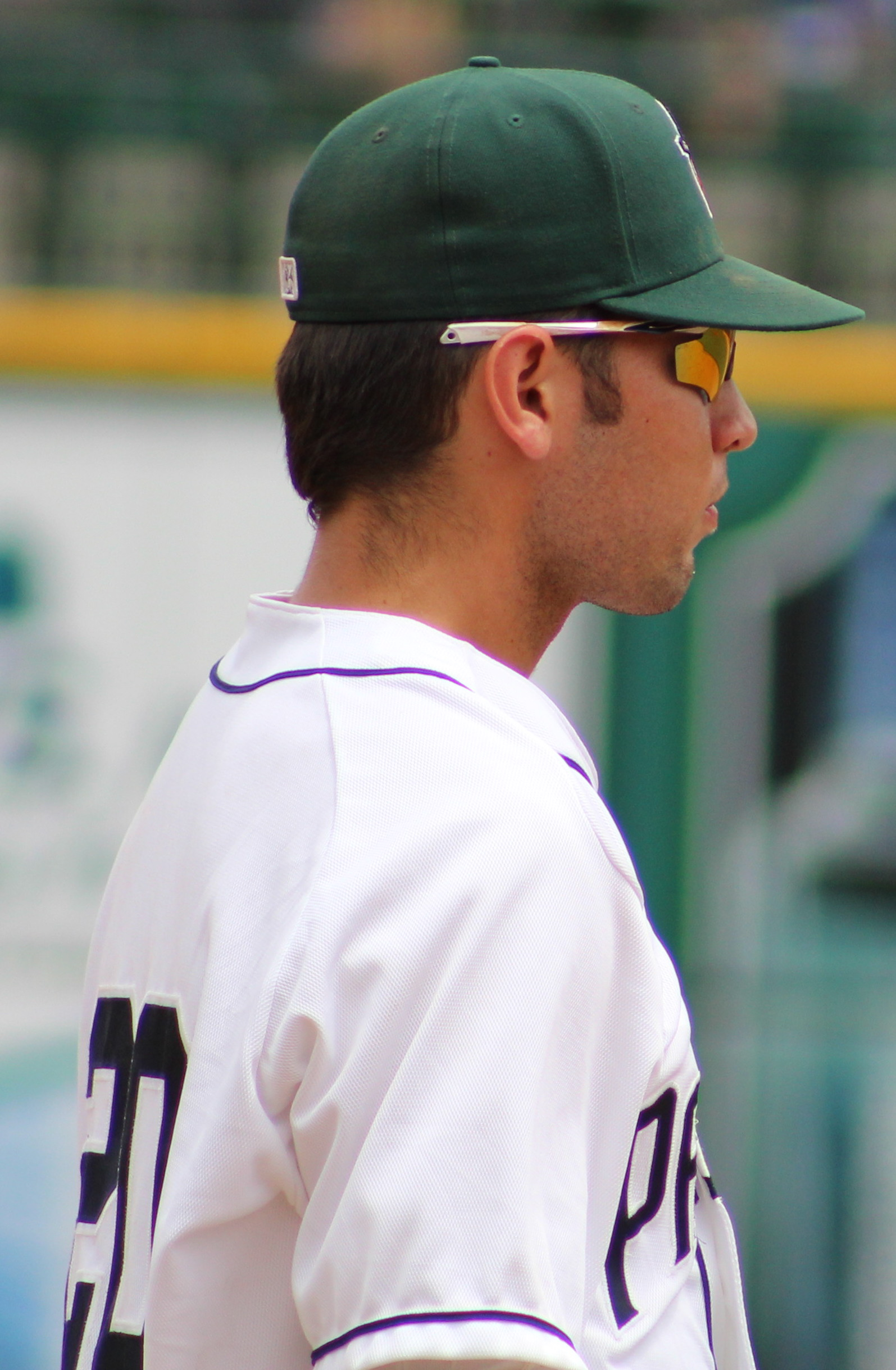
- Potts in 2017
- Third baseman
- Born: Hudson Sanchez; October 28, 1998 (age 27); Southlake, Texas, U.S.
- Bats: Right Throws: Right
- Stats at Baseball Reference

Hudson James Potts (born Hudson Sanchez on October 28, 1998) is an American former professional baseball third baseman. A first-round pick of the San Diego Padres in 2016, he never played in Major League Baseball (MLB) despite spending time on the 40-man roster of the Boston Red Sox.

== Personal life ==
Hudson Potts was known as Hudson Sanchez until 2016, when he took his stepfather's last name.

== Professional career ==
=== San Diego Padres ===
Potts was drafted by the San Diego Padres in the first round of the 2016 Major League Baseball draft out of Carroll Senior High School. He had committed to play college baseball for the Texas A&M Aggies, but chose to sign with the Padres.

After signing, Potts spent 2016 with both the Arizona League Padres and the Tri-City Dust Devils, posting a combined .280 batting average with one home run and 27 RBI in 59 games between both teams. He spent 2017 with the Fort Wayne TinCaps where he batted .253 with 20 home runs, 69 RBI, and a .731 OPS in 125 games, and 2018 with the Lake Elsinore Storm (earning California League All-Star honors) and the San Antonio Missions, slashing .260/.335/.455 with 19 home runs and 63 RBI in 128 games between the two teams. He spent 2019 with the Amarillo Sod Poodles, slashing .227/.290/.406 with 16 home runs and 59 RBI over 107 games. Following the 2019 season, Potts played for the Peoria Javelinas of the Arizona Fall League. He did not play in a game in 2020 due to the cancellation of the minor league season because of the COVID-19 pandemic.

=== Boston Red Sox ===
On August 30, 2020, Potts and outfielder Jeisson Rosario were traded to the Boston Red Sox in exchange for Mitch Moreland. Although he did not play during 2020 due to cancellation of the minor league season, Potts was subsequently invited to participate in the Red Sox' fall instructional league. On November 20, 2020, Potts was added to the 40-man roster. During spring training in 2021, he suffered an oblique strain. He began the minor-league season on the injured list until activated in June, joining the Double-A Portland Sea Dogs where he batted .217 with 11 home runs and 47 RBI in 78 games.

On March 22, 2022, Potts was designated for assignment by the Red Sox, removing him from the team's 40-man roster as they added Kyle Tyler via a waiver claim. He spent the season primarily with Double–A Portland, also playing in two games for the Triple–A Worcester Red Sox. In 75 games for Portland, Potts hit .234/.297/.454 with 14 home runs and 44 RBI. He elected free agency following the season on November 10.

=== Atlanta Braves ===
On December 5, 2022, Potts signed a minor league contract with the Atlanta Braves. He spent the 2023 campaign with the Double–A Mississippi Braves, also playing in one game for the High–A Augusta GreenJackets. In 72 games for Mississippi, Potts compiled a .160/.258/.311 batting line with eight home runs and 27 RBI. He elected free agency following the season on November 6, 2023.
