= Jamien Sherwood =

American football player (born 2000)

No. 44 – New York Jets
- Position: Linebacker
- Roster status: Active

Personal information
- Born: January 12, 2000 (age 26); Jensen Beach, Florida, U.S.
- Listed height: 6 ft 2 in (1.88 m)
- Listed weight: 216 lb (98 kg)

Career information
- High school: Jensen Beach
- College: Auburn (2018–2020)
- NFL draft: 2021: 5th round, 146th overall pick

Career history
- New York Jets (2021–present)

Awards and highlights
- NFL solo tackles leader (2024)

Career NFL statistics as of Week 10, 2026
- Total tackles: 475
- Sacks: 4.5
- Forced fumbles: 3
- Fumble recoveries: 1
- Pass deflections: 16
- Stats at Pro Football Reference

Jamien Sherwood (born January 12, 2000) is an American professional football linebacker for the New York Jets of the National Football League (NFL). He played college football for the Auburn Tigers.

== Early life ==
Sherwood attended Jensen Beach High School in Jensen Beach, Florida. He committed to Auburn University to play college football.

== College career ==
Sherwood played in 13 games his true freshman season at Auburn in 2018 and recorded 23 tackles, one interception and 1.5 sacks. As a sophomore in 2019, he had 43 tackles in 13 games. As a junior in 2020, Sherwood became a starter for the first time. He finished the 2020 season with 75 tackles and one sack.

== Professional career ==
Pre-draft measurables
Height	Weight	Arm length	Hand span	Wingspan	40-yard dash	10-yard split	20-yard split	20-yard shuttle	Three-cone drill	Vertical jump	Broad jump	Bench press
6 ft 1 3/4 in (1.87 m)	216 lb (98 kg)	34 in (0.86 m)	10 in (0.25 m)	6 ft 9 7/8 in (2.08 m)	4.74 s	1.64 s	2.82 s	4.36 s	7.15 s	36.0 in (0.91 m)	10 ft 3 in (3.12 m)	15 reps
All values from Pro Day

Sherwood was selected in the fifth round (146th overall) of the 2021 NFL draft by the New York Jets. Sherwood started in his NFL debut in Week 1 against the Carolina Panthers. In Week 7, Sherwood suffered a torn Achilles and was placed on season-ending injured reserve on October 26, 2021. As a rookie, he started in four of the five games he played in. He finished with 15 total tackles.

Sherwood returned from his injury for the 2022 season. He appeared in all 17 games. He recorded 16 total tackles and mainly played special teams. In the 2023 season, he had 46 tackles, one pass defended, and one forced fumble in 17 games and three starts.

On March 12, 2025, Sherwood signed a three-year, $45 million contract extension with the Jets.

== NFL career statistics ==
Legend
	Led the league
**Bold**	Career high

=== Regular season ===
Year	Team	Games		Tackles					Interceptions						Fumbles				
Year	Team	GP	GS	Cmb	Solo	Ast	Sck	TFL	Int	Yds	Avg	Lng	TD	PD	FF	Fmb	FR	Yds	TD
2021	NYJ	5	4	15	8	7	0.0	0	0	0	0.0	0	0	0	0	0	0	0	0
2022	NYJ	17	0	16	12	4	0.5	1	0	0	0.0	0	0	0	0	0	0	0	0
2023	NYJ	17	3	46	28	18	0.0	3	0	0	0.0	0	0	1	**1**	0	0	0	0
2024	NYJ	17	16	**158**	**98**	60	**2.0**	**10**	0	0	0.0	0	0	3	0	0	0	0	0
2025	NYJ	17	16	154	71	**83**	**2.0**	8	0	0	0.0	0	0	**8**	0	0	0	0	0
2026	NYJ	10	10	86	41	45	0.0	5	0	0	0.0	0	0	4	2	0	1	0	0
Career		83	49	475	258	217	4.5	27	0	0	0.0	0	0	16	3	0	1	0	0

== Personal life ==
Sherwood and his girlfriend Megan Lauren are expecting a baby girl, due to arrive in May 2026.
