= Braeden Ogle =

American baseball player (born 1997)

Free agent
- Pitcher
- Born: July 30, 1997 (age 27); Palm City, Florida, U.S.
- Bats: Left Throws: Left

Braeden Ogle (born July 30, 1997) is an American professional baseball pitcher who is a free agent.

== Amateur career ==
Ogle attended Jensen Beach High School in Jensen Beach, Florida. As a senior in 2016, he went 5–1 with a 1.40 ERA and 59 strikeouts over 35 innings. He was selected by the Pittsburgh Pirates in the fourth round with the 135th overall selection of the 2016 Major League Baseball draft. He signed for $800,000, forgoing his college commitment to the University of Florida.

== Professional career ==
=== Pittsburgh Pirates ===
Ogle made his professional debut with the Rookie-level Gulf Coast League Pirates, going 0–2 with a 2.60 ERA over 27 2/3 innings. In 2017, he played with the Bristol Pirates of the Rookie-level Appalachian League in which he pitched to a 2–3 record and a 3.14 ERA over 43 innings before undergoing knee surgery, ending his season prematurely. He began 2018 with the West Virginia Power of the Single-A South Atlantic League, but pitched only 17 innings before being shut down in early May for the rest of the season due to shoulder inflammation. In 2019, he began the season with the Greensboro Grasshoppers of the Single-A South Atlantic League and was promoted to the Bradenton Marauders of the High-A Florida State League in June. Over 43 innings between the two clubs, he went 3–3 with a 3.56 ERA and 44 strikeouts.

Ogle did not play in a game in 2020 due to the cancellation of the minor league season because of the COVID-19 pandemic. To begin the 2021 season, Ogle was assigned to the Indianapolis Indians of the Triple-A East. Over 31 2/3 innings with the Indians, Ogle went 2–2 with a 3.13 ERA, 42 strikeouts, and 23 walks.

=== Philadelphia Phillies ===
On July 30, 2021, Ogle was traded to the Philadelphia Phillies in exchange for Abrahán Gutiérrez. He was assigned to the Lehigh Valley IronPigs of the Triple-A East. Over twenty relief appearances with the IronPigs, Ogle went 1–3 with a 9.95 ERA, 14 walks, and 18 strikeouts over 19 innings. He returned to Lehigh Valley for the 2022 season. Over 36 relief appearances, he went 2–2 with a 5.30 ERA, 24 strikeouts, and 21 walks over 35 2/3 innings. On November 10, 2022, Ogle elected free agency.

=== Pittsburgh Pirates (second stint) ===
On February 22, 2023, Ogle signed a minor league contract to return to the Pittsburgh Pirates organization. He made 34 appearances split between the Double–A Altoona Curve and Triple–A Indianapolis Indians, accumulating a 5.35 ERA with 40 strikeouts and 2 saves across 37 innings pitched. Ogle elected free agency following the season on November 6.

=== High Point Rockers ===
On May 10, 2024, Ogle signed with the High Point Rockers of the Atlantic League of Professional Baseball. In 20 appearances for the Rockers, he recorded a 2.38 ERA with 33 strikeouts and one save across 22 2/3 innings pitched. Ogle became a free agent following the season.

On April 16, 2025, Ogle re-signed with High Point. In 16 appearances for the Rockers, he struggled to an 0-1 record and 10.90 ERA with 18 strikeouts across 17 1/3 innings pitched. Ogle was released by the team on June 30.
