= Staten Island FerryHawks =

American professional baseball team

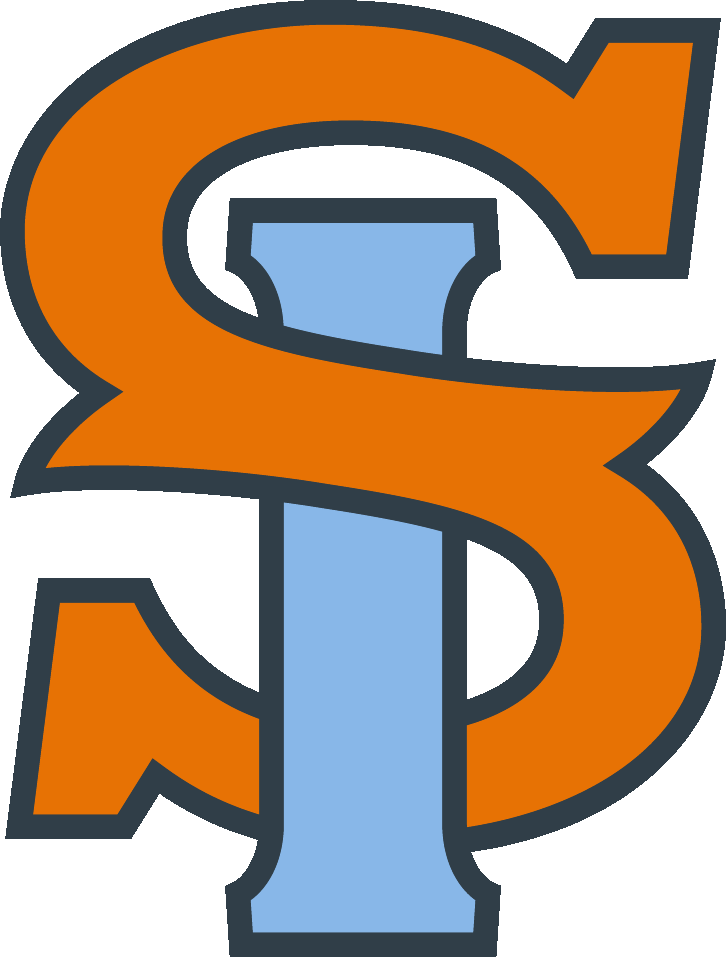
Logo	Cap insignia

Information
- League: Atlantic League of Professional Baseball
- Location: Staten Island, New York
- Ballpark: SIUH Community Park
- Founded: 2021
- Colors: Ferry orange, rock gray, harbor blue, white, hawk orange, Greenbelt green
- Ownership: Staten Island Entertainment LLC
- General manager: Gary Perone
- Manager: Wally Backman
- Media: Staten Island Advance
- Website: ferryhawks.com

The Staten Island FerryHawks are an American independent league professional baseball team based in the New York City borough of Staten Island. They are a member of the North Division of the Atlantic League of Professional Baseball, a "partner league" of Major League Baseball. They play their home games at SIUH Community Park, the former home of the Staten Island Yankees, which is in the St. George neighborhood and overlooks the Manhattan skyline across New York Harbor.

In 2021, Staten Islanders chose the name "FerryHawks" in a team-sponsored fan ballot. The name refers to the iconic Staten Island Ferry, which connects the borough to Manhattan across the harbor, and to the red-tailed (Buteo jamaicensis) and Cooper's hawks (Astur cooperii) native to Staten Island.

== History ==
The start of the 2020 Minor League Baseball season was postponed due to the COVID-19 pandemic before ultimately being cancelled on June 30. On November 7, 2020, the New York Yankees announced that they were withdrawing from Staten Island along with abandoning their affiliation with the Trenton Thunder and moving forward with the Somerset Patriots, but they would seek to place an Atlantic League team at Richmond County Bank Ballpark in 2021. On December 3, 2020, the Staten Island Yankees announced that the club would cease operations.

In 2021, the New York Economic Development Corporation (NYCEDC) was in talks with the Atlantic League to have an expansion team play at the stadium in 2022. On June 5, 2021, Atlantic League President Rick White announced that Staten Island "is close" to getting a franchise for the 2022 season.

On July 24, 2021, Staten Island Borough President James Oddo announced that the new franchise would be owned by Staten Island Entertainment LLC, an investment group including Yankee Global Enterprises, RedBird Capital Partners, John Catsimatidis, Dany Garcia, Eric Shuffler (a New Jersey politician), Colin Jost, Pete Davidson, and Michael Che. On August 2, 2021, the Atlantic League board of directors approved the ownership group's application to join the league. On August 17, 2021, it was reported that the ballpark's lease had been transferred from the Staten Island Yankees to Staten Island Entertainment.

On April 8, 2022, Kelsie Whitmore signed with the Staten Island FerryHawks. She debuted with them as a pinch runner on April 22, and while with them became the first woman to start an Atlantic League game on May 1, playing as a left fielder. She was hitless in three plate appearances but recorded two putouts in two chances in the field, catching fly balls hit by Gastonia Honey Hunters batters Reece Hampton (sacrifice fly) and Johnny Davis. On May 4, Whitmore became the first woman to pitch in an Atlantic League game when she made her first pitching appearance for Staten Island: Entering the game with the bases loaded and two outs, she retired Ryan Jackson, a former major leaguer, on a fly out to end the inning.

== Season-by-season record ==
Atlantic League of Professional Baseball
Year	Regular season			Postseason		
Year	Record	Win %	Finish	Record	Win %	Result
2022	48–84	.364	5th (North)	DNQ		
2023	49–75	.395	5th (North)	DNQ		
2024	55-69	.444	4th (North)	DNQ		
2025	56-70	.444	4th (North)	DNQ		
2026	21-103	.169	5th (North)	DNQ		
Totals	174-332	.344	—	—	—	—

== Logos and uniforms ==
The Staten Island FerryHawks logo features a copper-colored hawk wearing a baseball uniform, a ballcap, and holding a bat. The "Staten Island FerryHawks" wordmark arches over the logo in navy blue and orange. The cap logo includes the interlocking letters "SI" in orange and sky blue outlined in navy blue.

== Roster ==
Staten Island FerryHawks roster
Active (25-man) roster	Coaching staff
Pitchers: 48 Aidan Dolinsky; 29 Kevin Dowdell; 20 Thomas Geiger; 25 Brandon Haston; 12 Alex Katz; 26 John Kelly; 27 Brandon McCabe; 17 Nicholas Padilla; 18 Nick Pavero; 28 Stephen Woods Jr.; Catchers: 40 Michael Dorcean; 19 Isaiah Mirabal; 13 Oscar Santos; Infielders: 5 Luis Atiles; 7 Lamar Briggs; 1 Gary Mattis; 9 Tishawn Featherstone; 8 Drew Maggi; 50 Brandon Wagner; Outfielders: 2 Taylor Aguilar; 1 Nick Decker; 15 Joshua Palacios; 23 Blake Rutherford	Manager: -- Wally Backman; Coaches: -- Sean McNeill (pitching); -- David Valdez (hitting); Disabled list; ‡ Inactive list; § Suspended list; Roster updated April 22, 2026 Transactions
