= Jeisson Rosario =

Dominican baseball player (born 1999)

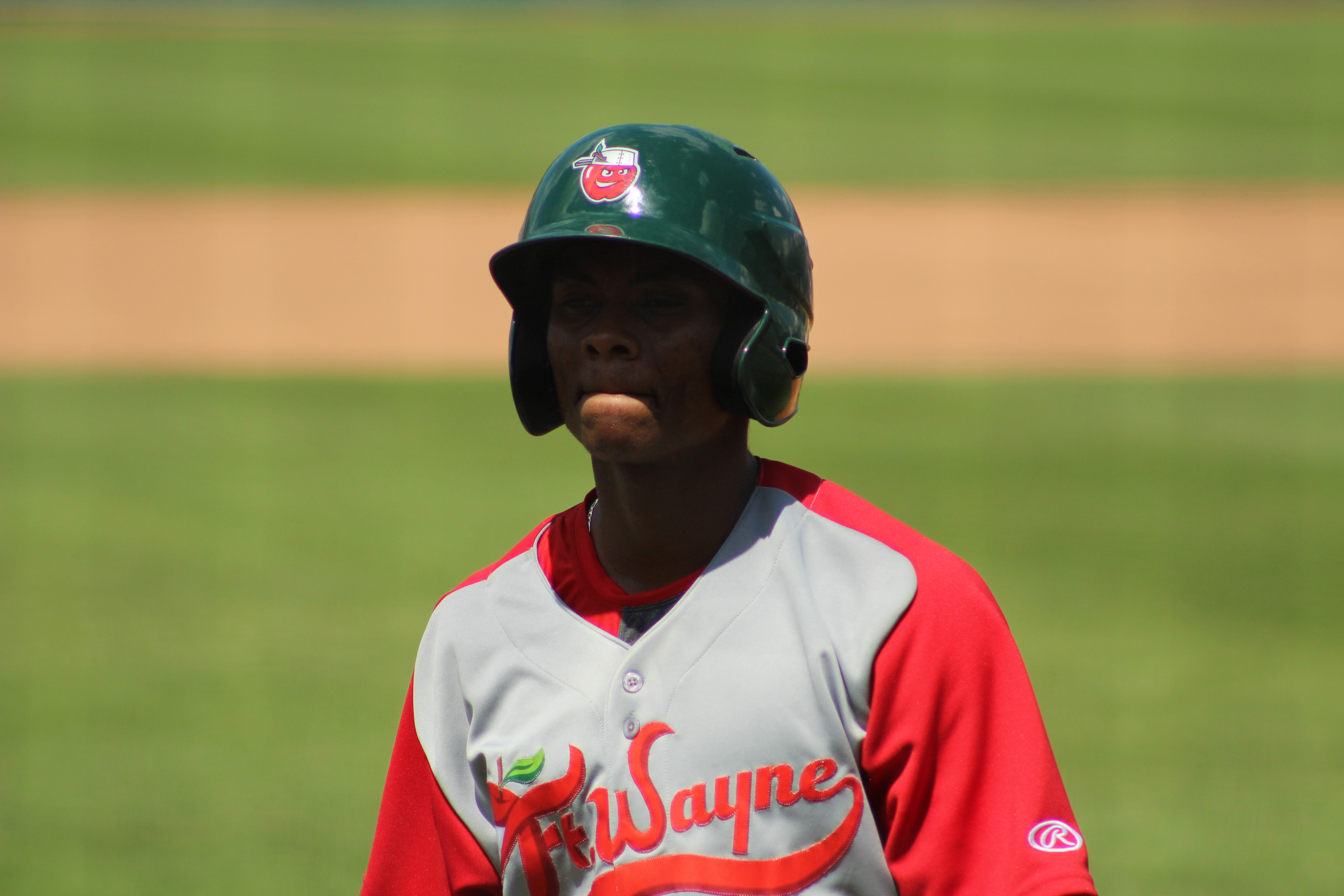
- Rosario with the Fort Wayne TinCaps in 2018
- Center fielder
- Born: October 22, 1999 (age 27); Santo Domingo, Dominican Republic
- Bats: Left Throws: Left

Jeisson Antonio Rosario (born October 22, 1999) is a Dominican former professional baseball center fielder. Listed at 6 feet 1 inch (1.85 m) and 191 pounds (87 kg), he bats and throws left-handed.

== Professional career ==
=== San Diego Padres ===
Rosario signed with the San Diego Padres as an international free agent in July 2016. He made his professional debut in 2017 with the rookie-level Arizona League Padres, batting .299 with one home run and 24 RBIs in 52 games. In 2018, he played for the Class A Fort Wayne TinCaps, appearing in 117 games while compiling a .271 average with three home runs and 34 RBIs. In 2019, Rosario played 120 games for the Class A-Advanced Lake Elsinore Storm, batting .242 with three home runs and 35 RBIs.

=== Boston Red Sox ===
On August 30, 2020, Rosario and infielder Hudson Potts were traded to the Boston Red Sox in exchange for Mitch Moreland. Although he did not play during 2020 due to cancellation of the minor league season, Rosario was invited to participate in the Red Sox' fall instructional league. On November 20, 2020, he was added to the 40-man roster. Rosario spent the 2021 season in Double-A with the Portland Sea Dogs, appearing in 98 games while batting .232 with three home runs and 36 RBIs. He played in the Dominican Professional Baseball League (LIDOM) during the offseason.

On March 23, 2022, Rosario was designated for assignment by the Red Sox following the signing of Trevor Story.

=== New York Yankees ===
On March 26, 2022, Rosario was claimed off of waivers by the New York Yankees. He was then optioned to the Double-A Somerset Patriots. He was designated for assignment on April 6, 2022. He cleared waivers and was sent outright to Somerset on April 9.

In 2023, Rosario played in 106 games for Double-A Somerset, slashing .218/.360/.355 with 10 home runs, a career–high 47 RBI, and 11 stolen bases. He elected free agency following the season on November 6.

=== Oakland Athletics ===
On November 21, 2023, Rosario signed a minor league contract with the Oakland Athletics. He spent 2024 with the Double-A Midland RockHounds, playing in 74 games and slashing .258/.355/.349 with three home runs, 38 RBI, and eight stolen bases. Rosario elected free agency following the season on November 4, 2024.
