= Spencer Jones (pitcher) =

American baseball player (born 1994)

- Pitcher
- Born: September 22, 1994 (age 31); Sparks, Nevada, U.S.
- Bats: Right Throws: Right
- Stats at Baseball Reference

Spencer Jones (born September 22, 1994) is an American former professional baseball pitcher.

== Early life ==
Jones went to Edward C. Reed High School in Sparks, Nevada, graduating in 2012. He began his college baseball career at Mendocino College. After two years, he transferred to the University of Washington to play for the Washington Huskies for two more seasons.

== Career ==
=== Tampa Bay Rays ===
The Tampa Bay Rays selected Jones in the 10th round, with the 300th selection, of the 2016 MLB draft. He received a $10,000 signing bonus, despite the $156,000 slot value for the pick, and made his professional debut with the Hudson Valley Renegades. In 2017, Jones made 36 appearances split between the Single-A Bowling Green Hot Rods and High-A Charlotte Stone Crabs, posting a combined 2.25 ERA with 74 strikeouts and 5 saves in 68.0 innings pitched.

Jones split the 2018 season between Charlotte and the Double-A Montgomery Biscuits, posting a cumulative 5-3 record and 2.76 ERA with 40 strikeouts and 3 saves in 62.0 innings pitched across 36 total games. On March 27, 2019, Jones was released by the Rays organization.

=== St. Paul Saints ===
On April 18, 2019, Jones signed with the St. Paul Saints of the American Association of Professional Baseball. He made 7 appearances (5 starts) for the Saints, pitching to a pristine 1.34 ERA with 29 strikeouts.

=== Acereros de Monclova ===
On July 9, 2019, Jones signed with the Acereros de Monclova of the Mexican League. He made 9 starts for Monclova, recording a 3-1 record and 5.75 ERA with 32 strikeouts in 40 2/3 innings of work. On February 17, 2020, Jones was released by the team.

=== St. Paul Saints (second stint) ===
On June 22, 2020, Jones signed with the St. Paul Saints of the American Association of Professional Baseball, marking his second stint with the club. In 10 appearances for the team, he recorded a 6.95 ERA with 19 strikeouts in 22.0 innings pitched. He was released by the team on August 20.

=== Sioux City Explorers ===
On August 7, 2021, Jones signed with the Sioux City Explorers of the American Association of Professional Baseball. He pitched in two games for the Explorers, but surrendered 4 earned runs on 5 hits and 3 walks with no strikeouts in 1 2/3 innings of work. He was released on August 17.

== International career ==
He played for the United States national baseball team in the 2019 WBSC Premier12.
