= Nick Decker =

American baseball player (born 1999)

Staten Island FerryHawks – No. 1
- Outfielder
- Born: October 2, 1999 (age 27); Philadelphia, Pennsylvania, U.S.
- Bats: Left Throws: Left

Nicholas Decker (born October 2, 1999) is an American professional baseball outfielder who plays for the Staten Island FerryHawks. Listed at 6 feet 0 inches (1.83 m) and 200 pounds (91 kg), he both throws and bats left-handed.

== Career ==
Raised in Southampton Township, New Jersey, Decker attended Seneca High School. He committed to play baseball on scholarship at the University of Maryland. He played in the 2017 Perfect Game All American Classic, where he received a lot of exposure with draft scouts.

=== Boston Red Sox ===
Decker was drafted by the Boston Red Sox in the second round (64th pick overall) of the 2018 MLB draft. Rather than attending Maryland, he chose to sign with the Red Sox for a $1.25 million signing bonus. Decker played briefly with the rookie-level Gulf Coast League Red Sox during the 2018 season, appearing in two games and going 1-for-4 (.250) at the plate. He began the 2019 season in extended spring training, then joined the Low-A Lowell Spinners at the start of their season. With Lowell, he appeared in 53 games, batting .247 with six home runs and 25 RBI. Decker did not play in a game in 2020 due to the cancellation of the minor league season because of the COVID-19 pandemic. He was subsequently was invited to participate in the Red Sox' fall instructional league.

Decker began the 2021 season in Low-A with the Salem Red Sox. In late June, he was assigned to the Florida Complex League Red Sox where he played five games on a rehabilitation assignment following an injury. He made 73 appearances split between the rookie-level Florida Complex League Red Sox and Salem, batting a cumulative .270/.375/.437 with eight home runs and 40 RBI. Decker spent the 2022 season in High-A with the Greenville Drive; in 71 games, he slashed .122/.275/.239 with six home runs and 18 RBI. He returned to Greenville for the 2023 campaign, batting .218 with seven home runs and 24 RBI in 68 games.

Decker spent the 2024 season with the Double-A Portland Sea Dogs, making 56 appearances and batting .178/.266/.344 with six home runs, 24 RBI, and seven stolen bases. He elected free agency following the season on November 4, 2024.Staten Island FerryHawks

On April 15, 2025, Decker signed with the Staten Island FerryHawks of the Atlantic League of Professional Baseball. In 37 appearances for Staten Island, he batted .207/.315/.372 with five home runs and 15 RBI. Decker was released by the FerryHawks on August 22.

On May 15, 2026, Decker returned to the Staten Island FerryHawks. In 93 appearances for Staten Island, he batted .223/.309/.439 with 17 home runs and 53 RBI.
