= Thomas Dillard =

American baseball player (born 1997)

- First baseman
- Born: August 28, 1997 (age 29); Greenwood, Mississippi, U.S.
- Bats: Switch Throws: Right

Thomas Dillard (born August 28, 1997) is an American former professional baseball first baseman.

== Amateur career ==
Dillard began his high school career at Briarcrest Christian School in Eads, Tennessee, before transferring to Oxford High School in Oxford, Mississippi as a senior, where he was teammates with Grae Kessinger. In the summer of 2015, he played in the Under Armour All-America Baseball Game at Wrigley Field. He earned All-USA honors as a senior after batting .438 with 16 home runs. He committed to play college baseball at the University of Mississippi for the Ole Miss Rebels. Unselected in the 2016 Major League Baseball draft, he enrolled at Ole Miss.

In 2017, as a freshman at Ole Miss, Dillard appeared in 48 games (making 45 starts) in which he hit .206 with four home runs, eight doubles, and 12 RBIs. As a sophomore, he started 65 games in left field without making an error and batted .310 and led the Rebels with 13 home runs, 59 RBIs, and 17 stolen bases. In 2017 and 2018, he played collegiate summer baseball with the Cotuit Kettleers of the Cape Cod Baseball League. In 2019, his junior year, he returned to catching, started 68 games, and hit .310 with 14 home runs, 61 RBIs, and set an Ole Miss single-season record with 61 walks. Following the season's end, he was selected by the Milwaukee Brewers in the fifth round of the 2019 Major League Baseball draft. He signed for $397,500.

== Professional career ==
=== Milwaukee Brewers ===
Dillard made his professional debut with the Rookie-level Arizona League Brewers and was promoted to the Wisconsin Timber Rattlers of the Single–A Midwest League after four games. Over 55 games between the two clubs, he hit .249 with seven home runs, 28 RBIs, and eight stolen bases. He did not play in a game in 2020 due to the cancellation of the minor league season because of the COVID-19 pandemic.

To begin the 2021 season, he was assigned back to Wisconsin, now members of the High-A Central, and was promoted to the Biloxi Shuckers of the Double-A South in early August. Over 105 games between the two clubs, Dillard slashed .247/.365/.444 with 18 home runs and 75 RBIs. He returned to Biloxi for the 2022 season. Over 121 games, he compiled a .233/.364/.391 slash line with 12 home runs, 67 RBIs, 29 doubles, and 14 stolen bases. He was released on by the Brewers organization on December 16, 2022.

=== Lexington Counter Clocks ===
On April 28, 2023, Dillard signed with the Lexington Counter Clocks of the Atlantic League of Professional Baseball. In 125 games for Lexington, Dillard hit .258/.398/.590 with 39 home runs, 100 RBI, and 8 stolen bases.

On December 21, 2023, Dillard signed with the Saraperos de Saltillo of the Mexican League. However, he failed to make the Opening Day roster and was released prior to the season on April 6, 2024.

=== Cleburne Railroaders ===
On April 11, 2024, Dillard signed with the Cleburne Railroaders of the American Association of Professional Baseball. In 95 appearances for Cleburne, Dillard batted .260/.420/.474 with 16 home runs, 62 RBI, and 22 stolen bases.
