= Jensen Beach High School =

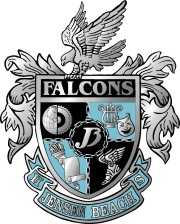

Location
- 2875 Northwest Goldenrod Road; Jensen Beach, Martin County, Florida 34957-3552; United States; 27°14′26″N 80°16′00″W

Information
- School type: Public, Secondary
- School district: Martin County School District
- Dean: Kathleen Wonnell
- Principal: Lori Vogel
- Staff: 77.50 (FTE)
- Gender: Co-educational
- Enrollment: 1,657 (2023–2024)
- Student to teacher ratio: 21.38
- Colors: Teal, Black, and Silver
- Mascot: Falcon
- Nickname: Falcons
- Website: Official Site

Jensen Beach High School (JBHS) is a public high school in Jensen Beach, Florida.

== History ==
JBHS opened in August 2004 with an enrollment of 1100 students in grades 9 through 11. A senior class was added the following year. It was an open choice school for several years but only accepted local students for some time. Starting in 2021 they made the change to become open choice again.

The 270,000 square feet (25,000 m^{2}) building complex is spread over 100 acres (0.40 km^{2}), which includes 17 acres (69,000 m^{2}) of mitigated wetlands.

During the summer of 2013, the original principal, Ginger Featherstone, was promoted to the district position of Director of Secondary, Adult, and Community Vocational Programs. In the summer of 2015, the second principal, Greg Laws, retired citing personal health reasons. The current principal is Lori Vogel.

== Recognition ==
The school is accredited by the Southern Association of Colleges and Schools (SACS). It has been an "A" school for five straight years. Jensen Beach High School was graded a B for the 2010/2011 school year. In 2009, Newsweek magazine ranked JBHS as one of the top schools in the nation (636 out of 1500). In 2010 and 2011 "Newsweek" magazine rated JBHS one of the top schools in the nation. In 2011, JBHS was the only one of the three Martin County high schools to be credited by "Newsweek" (Four including Clark Advanced Learning Center, which is a National Model High School). In 2009, the International Center for Leadership in Education recognized JBHS as one of the 40 top schools in the nation. Previous recognition includes the Florida Department of Education naming JBHS as one of the top-50 high schools in the state and being named a Positive Behavior Support (PBS) Model School (2007).

== Athletics ==
JBHS has earned several state overall championships and first-place event results:

=== Boys ===
- Boys' Soccer: 2006
- Boys' Tennis: 2016
- Boys' Wrestling: multiple state champions

=== Girls ===
- Girls' Basketball: 2007
- Girls' Swimming: 2020 (400 yd freestyle relay), 2021 (200 yd & 400 yd freestyle relays)
- Girls' Track & Field: 2006 (4 × 800 Relay)
- Girls' Volleyball: 2007, 2009, 2012, 2015, 2022

== Alumni ==
- Joe Sclafani (class of 2008), professional baseball player who was drafted by the Houston Astros
- Braeden Ogle (class of 2016), professional baseball player who was drafted by the Pittsburgh Pirates
- Jaida Parker (class of 2017), professional wrestler
- Lyon Richardson (class of 2018), MLB player
- Jamien Sherwood (class of 2018), NFL player
