= Lake Minneola High School =

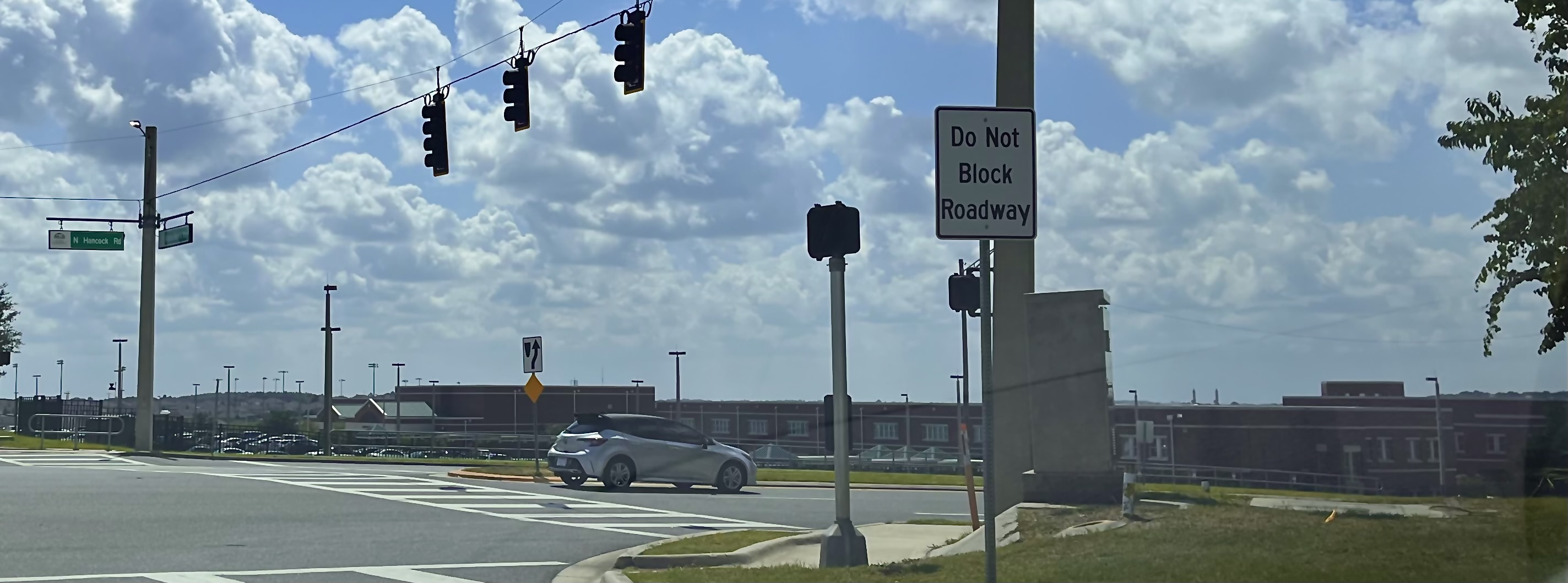

Location
- 101 N Hancock Rd; Minneola, Florida 34715; United States
- 28.580832°N 81.720922°W

Information
- Other name: LMHS
- Type: Public
- Established: c. 2011
- School district: Lake County Schools
- Principal: William Roberts
- Teaching staff: 92.50 (FTE)
- Grades: 9 to 12
- Enrollment: 2,281 (2023–24)
- Student to teacher ratio: 24.66
- Colors: Green and gold
- Mascot: Hawk
- Website: lmh.lake.k12.fl.us

Lake Minneola High School (LMHS) is located in Minneola, Florida, United States. It is a public high school that serves grades 9–12.

Established in 2011, Lake Minneola High School is one of seven high schools in Lake County, and one of the first in Central Florida to implement an iPad-based education. It was built to alleviate overflow of sister schools South Lake High School and East Ridge High School. Lake Minneola has also seen 2 students get drafted to the MLB the first was Drew Mendoza in 2019 and Keagan Zinn in 2023.

== Sports ==
The school Athletics webpage does not mention any specific sports.

== Notable alumni ==
- Drew Mendoza - MLB Baseball Player

== Performing arts ==
In March 2018, the LMHS thespian troupe attended the Florida State Thespian Competition and received top rankings in the monologue and large group categories. The troupe also took their first one-act play to the state competition.
