= Drew Mendoza =

American baseball player (born 1997)

High Point Rockers – No. 22
- First baseman / Third baseman
- Born: October 10, 1997 (age 29); Ocoee, Florida, U.S.
- Bats: Left Throws: Right

Andrew Keeler Mendoza (born October 10, 1997) is an American professional baseball first baseman for the High Point Rockers of the Atlantic League of Professional Baseball.

== Amateur career ==
Mendoza attended Lake Minneola High School in Minneola, Florida. As a senior in 2016, he hit .416 with seven home runs and 31 RBIs. He was drafted by the Detroit Tigers in the 36th round of the 2016 Major League Baseball draft but he did not sign and instead chose to enroll at Florida State University to play college baseball for the Florida State Seminoles.

In 2017, as a freshman at Florida State, Mendoza appeared in 43 games, batting .270 with ten home runs and 33 RBIs. He was named a Freshman All-American, to the All-ACC Freshman Team, and to the College World Series All-Tournament Team. Following the season, he played collegiate summer baseball with the Yarmouth–Dennis Red Sox of the Cape Cod Baseball League (CCBL). As a sophomore in 2018, Mendoza started all 63 of FSU's games, hitting .313 with seven home runs and 44 RBIs. For the second straight year, he was named an All-American. He was also named to the All-ACC Third Team. After the season, he returned to the CCBL to play for the Chatham Anglers. In 2019, Mendoza's junior year, he hit .308 with 16 home runs and 56 RBIs in 65 games.

== Professional career ==
=== Washington Nationals ===
Mendoza was considered one of the top prospects for the 2019 Major League Baseball draft. He was selected by the Washington Nationals in the third round (94th overall), and signed for $800,000. He made his professional debut with the Hagerstown Suns of the Single-A South Atlantic League, and spent the whole season there, slashing .264/.377/.383 with four home runs and 25 RBI over 55 games. He did not play a minor league game in 2020 due to the cancellation of the minor league season caused by the COVID-19 pandemic.

To begin the 2021 season, Mendoza was assigned to the Harrisburg Senators of the Double-A Northeast. After slashing only .160/.274/.330 with four home runs and 11 RBI over 34 games, he was demoted to the Wilmington Blue Rocks of the High-A East in June with whom he finished the year. Over seventy games with Wilmington, he slashed .225/.333/.312 with five home runs and thirty RBI. He returned to Wilmington for the 2022 season. Over 101 games, he batted .208 with seven home runs and fifty RBI.

Mendoza was released by the Nationals organization on March 27, 2023.

=== York Revolution ===
On April 10, 2023, Mendoza signed with the York Revolution of the Atlantic League of Professional Baseball. He played in 123 games for the team in 2023, batting .346/.437/.561 with 15 home runs, 87 RBI, and 23 stolen bases. Following the season, Mendoza was named York's player of the year, as well as an Atlantic League All–Star.

=== Dorados de Chihuahua ===
On February 7, 2024, Mendoza signed with the Toros de Tijuana of the Mexican League. On April 10, Mendoza was loaned to the Dorados de Chihuahua of the Mexican League. In 10 games for Chihuahua, he went 8–for–34 (.235) with no home runs and two RBI. Mendoza was released by the Dorados on April 26.

=== High Point Rockers ===
On March 24, 2025, Mendoza signed with the High Point Rockers of the Atlantic League of Professional Baseball. In 119 games he hit .293/.388/.493 with 19 home runs, 96 RBIs and 11 stolen bases.
