= Bret Boswell =

American baseball player (born 1994)

- Shortstop
- Born: October 4, 1994 (age 31); Rockwall, Texas, U.S.
- Bats: Left Throws: Right

Bret Robert Boswell (born October 4, 1994) is an American former professional baseball shortstop. He was drafted by the Colorado Rockies in the 8th round of the 2017 MLB draft.

== Amateur career ==
Boswell attended Rockwall-Heath High School in Rockwall, Texas, where he played baseball. As a junior in 2012, he batted .389 with four home runs. In 2013, as a senior, he hit .538. Undrafted in the 2013 Major League Baseball draft, he enrolled at the University of Texas where he played college baseball.

In 2014, Boswell's freshman year at Texas, he suffered a wrist injury that forced him to miss the year. As a redshirt freshman in 2015, he hit .253 with two home runs and twenty RBIs over 5 games, earning a spot on the Big 12 Conference All-Freshman Team, and in 2016, as a redshirt sophomore, he played in 44 games in which he hit .241 with two home runs. That summer, he played in the California Collegiate League for the Santa Barbara Foresters where he batted .392 with ten home runs over 34 games. In 2017, Boswell's redshirt junior season at Texas, he hit .273 with seven home runs and 33 RBIs over 61 games.

== Professional career ==
=== Colorado Rockies ===
Boswell was selected by the Colorado Rockies in the eighth round of the 2017 Major League Baseball draft. He signed and made his professional debut that year with the Boise Hawks of the Low–A Northwest League, slashing .293/.339/.515 with 11 home runs and 42 RBIs over 54 games. In 2018, he began the year with the Asheville Tourists of the Single–A South Atlantic League, with whom he earned All-Star honors. He was promoted to the Lancaster JetHawks of the High–A California League in July. Over 127 games between the two teams, he batted .296 with 27 home runs and 78 RBIs.

He spent the 2019 season with the Hartford Yard Goats of the Double–A Eastern League, hitting .219 with 15 home runs and 39 RBIs. After the season, he played in the Arizona Fall League for the Salt River Rafters. He did not play in a game in 2020 due to the cancellation of the minor league season because to the COVID-19 pandemic. On November 20, 2020, the Rockies added Boswell to their 40-man roster to protect him from the Rule 5 draft.

On May 24, 2021, it was announced Boswell would miss all of the 2021 season with an ankle injury. That same day, he was designated for assignment by the Rockies. On May 30, Boswell re-signed with the Rockies on a minor league contract. He was assigned to the Triple–A Albuquerque Isotopes to begin the 2022 season. Over 85 games, he hit .247/.340/.432 with 12 home runs and 34 RBIs. Boswell elected free agency following the season on November 10, 2022.

On February 3, 2023, Boswell re-signed with the Rockies on a minor league contract. In 66 games for Double–A Hartford, Boswell batted .186/.295/.340 with 6 home runs and 26 RBI. He was released by the Rockies organization on July 9.

=== Cleburne Railroaders ===
On July 26, 2023, Boswell signed with the Cleburne Railroaders of the American Association of Professional Baseball. In 37 games he hit .318/.382/.676 with 14 home runs, 43 RBIs and 2 stolen bases.

On March 13, 2024, Boswell re-signed with the Railroaders. In 97 games for Cleburne, he batted .251/.347/.437 with 13 home runs, 62 RBI, and eight stolen bases. He became a free agent following the season.
